= And the World Goes 'Round =

Musical revue

- Original Cast Recording
- Music: John Kander
- Lyrics: Fred Ebb
- Book: Revue
- Productions: 1991 Off-Broadway; 1992 U.S. Tour

And the World Goes 'Round is a musical revue showcasing the songs of John Kander and Fred Ebb. The revue takes its title from a tune the songwriting team wrote for Liza Minnelli to sing in the film New York, New York (that song, however, is titled "But the World Goes 'Round").

== Productions ==
The show consists of an eclectic collection of love songs, torch songs, and acerbically witty comic numbers. It was conceived by director Scott Ellis, choreographer Susan Stroman, and librettist David Thompson, who collaborated on such Kander and Ebb shows as Steel Pier and the 1996 revival of Chicago. David Loud created the vocal and dance arrangements.

It opened on March 18, 1991 Off-Broadway at the Westside Theatre, and closed on March 8, 1992, after 408 performances. The original cast featured Karen Ziemba, Robert Cuccioli, Karen Mason, Brenda Pressley, and Jim Walton. Natalie Venetia Belcon, Joel Blum and Marin Mazzie were replacements later in the run.

It won the Lucille Lortel Award for Outstanding Musical, and Cuccioli received the Outer Critics Circle Award for his performance. Additional honors included Drama Desk Awards for Outstanding Musical Revue, Outstanding Featured Actress in a Musical (Ziemba), and Outstanding Director of a Musical.

An original cast recording was released by RCA Records.

Starting in August 1992, Ziemba, Blum, and Mazzie were joined by John Ruess and Shelley Dickinson for a 10-month US national tour. With scenic and technical embellishments added and the title simplified to The World Goes 'Round, the revised edition included mostly upbeat, unfamiliar songs from the team's lesser musicals: The Happy Time, The Rink, The Act, Flora the Red Menace, and what was then a work-in-progress, Kiss of the Spider Woman.

Throughout the years the revue has been staged by regional and community theatre groups and as a fringe theatre production in London.

With direction and choreography by Nikki Snelson and musical direction by Ben Kiley, the show premiered in Singapore on September 26, 2013, in the Singapore Airlines Theatre at LASALLE College of the Arts. The shows cast included Kimberly Chan, Chinie Concepcion, Samantha Kwok, Brett Khaou, Hannah Lucas, Renfred Ng, Jordan Prainito and Rachel Tay.

== Songs ==
Sources: IBdb AllMusic

- The World Goes 'Round – New York, New York
- Yes – 70, Girls, 70
- Coffee in a Cardboard Cup – 70, Girls, 70
- The Happy Time – The Happy Time
- Colored Lights – The Rink
- Sara Lee
- Arthur in the Afternoon – The Act
- My Coloring Book
- I Don't Remember You – The Happy Time
- Sometimes a Day Goes By – Woman of the Year
- All That Jazz – Chicago
- Mr. Cellophane – Chicago
- Class – Chicago
- There Goes the Ball Game – New York, New York
- How Lucky Can You Get? – Funny Lady
- The Rink – The Rink
- Ring Them Bells – Liza with a Z
- Kiss of the Spider Woman – Kiss of the Spider Woman
- Only Love - Zorba
- Marry Me – The Rink
- A Quiet Thing – Flora the Red Menace
- Pain
- The Grass is Always Greener – Woman of the Year
- City Lights - Act
- We Can Make It – The Rink
- Maybe This Time – Cabaret
- Isn't This Better? – Funny Lady
- The Money Song – Cabaret
- Cabaret – Cabaret
- Theme from New York, New York – New York, New York

== Critical response ==
In his New York Times review, Frank Rich wrote:

And the World Goes 'Round: The Songs of Kander and Ebb, the new revue at the commodiously renovated Westside Theater, may be its authors' long overdue smash. The evening is an unexpected delight: a handsome, tasteful, snazzily staged outpouring of song and dance that celebrates all the virtues of the Kander-Ebb catalogue while scrupulously avoiding most of the cloying cliches of and-then-I-wrote anthologies. The revue is sophisticated enough to satisfy aficionados like myself, who recently spent a week's allowance to replace a worn copy of the out-of-print cast album of The Happy Time, and welcoming enough to convert new audiences to the Kander-Ebb fold. The five fresh performers, mostly familiar but unheralded Broadway hands, are the best team of its sort to hit town since the quintet in Ain't Misbehavin'.
