= Outer Critics Circle Award for Outstanding New Broadway Musical =

Annual American musical theatre award

The Outer Critics Circle Award for Outstanding New Broadway Musical is given annually to the best new Broadway musical, as determined by the Outer Critics Circle, an organization of theater critics, journalists, and feature writers representing national and digital publications. This award has been presented each year since 1950 (when it was known as simply the award for Best Musical). The award goes to the producers of the winning musical.

This is a list of winners and nominees for the Outer Critics Circle Award for Outstanding New Broadway Musical through the years.

== Winners and nominees ==
=== 1950s ===
Year	Musical	Book	Music	Lyrics	Ref.
1951	Guys and Dolls	Abe Burrows and Jo Swerling	Frank Loesser	Frank Loesser	
1953	Wonderful Town	Jerome Chodorov and Joseph Fields	Leonard Bernstein	Betty Comden and Adolph Green	
1954	Kismet	Luther Davis and Charles Lederer	Alexander Borodin	Chet Forrest and Robert Wright	
1955	Three for Tonight				
1956	My Fair Lady	Alan Jay Lerner	Frederick Loewe	Alan Jay Lerner	
1958	The Music Man	Meredith Willson	Meredith Willson	Meredith Willson	

=== 2010s ===
Year	Musical	Book	Music	Lyrics
2010	Memphis	Joe DiPietro	David Bryan	Joe DiPietro
2010	American Idiot	Michael Mayer and Billie Joe Armstrong	Green Day	Billie Joe Armstrong
2010	Come Fly Away	Twyla Tharp	Various	
2010	Fela!	Bill T. Jones and Jim Lewis	Fela Kuti	
2010	Sondheim on Sondheim	James Lapine	Stephen Sondheim	
2011	The Book of Mormon	Trey Parker, Robert Lopez, and Matt Stone		
2011	Memphis	Joe DiPietro	David Bryan	Joe DiPietro
2011	Priscilla, Queen of the Desert	Stephan Elliott and Allan Scott	various	
2011	Sister Act	Bill and Cheri Steinkellner	Alan Menken	Glenn Slater
2011	Women on the Verge of a Nervous Breakdown	Jeffrey Lane	David Yazbek	
2012	Once	Enda Walsh	Glen Hansard and Markéta Irglová	
2012	Bonnie & Clyde	Ivan Menchell	Frank Wildhorn	Don Black
2012	Newsies	Harvey Fierstein	Alan Menken	Jack Feldman
2012	Spider-Man: Turn Off the Dark	Julie Taymor, Glen Berger and Roberto Aguirre-Sacasa	Bono and The Edge	
2013	Kinky Boots	Harvey Fierstein	Cindy Lauper	
2013	Chaplin: the Musical			
2013	A Christmas Story, the Musical	Joseph Robinette	Benji Pasek and Justin Paul	
2013	Hands on a Hardbody	Doug Wright	Trey Anastasio and Amanda Green	Amanda Green
2013	Matilda the Musical	Dennis Kelly	Tim Minchin	
2014	A Gentleman's Guide to Love and Murder	Robert L. Freedman	Steven Lutvak	Steven Lutvak and Robert L. Freedman
2014	After Midnight		various	various
2014	Aladdin	Chad Beguelin	Alan Menken	Howard Ashman
2014	Beautiful: the Carole King Musical	Douglas McGrath	Carole King, Gerry Goffin, Barry Mann and Cynthia Weil	
2014	Rocky the Musical	Thomas Meehan and Sylvester Stallone	Stephen Flaherty	Lynn Ahrens
2015	An American in Paris	Craig Lucas	George and Ira Gershwin	
2015	It Shoulda Been You	Brian Hargrove	Barbara Anselmi	Brian Hargrove
2015	The Last Ship	John Logan and Brian Yorkey	Sting	
2015	Something Rotten!	John O'Farrell and Karey Kirkpatrick	Karey and Wayne Kirkpatrick	
2015	The Visit	Terrence McNally	Fred Ebb	John Kander
2016	Bright Star	Steve Martin and Edie Brickell		
2016	American Psycho	Roberto Aguirre-Sacasa	Duncan Sheik	
2016	On Your Feet!	Alexander Dinelaris Jr.	Gloria Estefan	
2016	Tuck Everlasting	Claudia Shear and Tim Federle	Chris Miller	Nathan Tysen
2016	Waitress	Jessie Nelson	Sara Bareilles	
2017	Come From Away	Irene Sankoff and David Hein		
2017	Anastasia	Terrence McNally	Stephen Flaherty and Lynn Ahrens	
2017	A Bronx Tale	Chazz Palminteri	Alan Menken	Glenn Slater
2017	Groundhog Day	Danny Rubin	Tim Minchin	
2017	Holiday Inn	Gordon Greenberg and Chad Hodge	Irving Berlin	
2018
2018	SpongeBob SquarePants	Kyle Jarrow	various	
2018	Escape to Margaritaville	Greg Garcia and Mike O'Malley	Jimmy Buffett	
2018	Frozen	Jennifer Lee	Kristen Anderson-Lopez and Robert Lopez	
2018	Mean Girls	Tina Fey	Jeff Richmond	Nell Benjamin
2018	Prince of Broadway	David Thompson	various	
2019	Hadestown	Anaïs Mitchell		
2019	Be More Chill	Joe Tracz	Joe Iconis	
2019	Head Over Heels	Jeff Whitty	The Go-Go's	
2019	The Prom	Bob Martin and Chad Beguelin	Matthew Sklar	Chad Beguelin
2019	Tootsie	Robert Horn	David Yazbek	

=== 2020s ===
Year	Musical	Book	Music	Lyrics
2021-2022	Six	Toby Marlow and Lucy Moss		
2021-2022	MJ	Lynn Nottage	Michael Jackson and others	
2021-2022	Mr Saturday Night	Billy Crystal, Lowell Ganz and Babaloo Mandel	Jason Robert Brown	Amanda Green
2021-2022	Mrs Doubtfire	Karey Kirkpatrick and John O'Farrell	Karey and Wayne Kirkpatrick	
2021-2022	Paradise Square	Christina Anderson, Larry Kirwan and Craig Lucas		
2022-2023	Some Like it Hot	Matthew López and Amber Ruffin	Marc Shaiman	Marc Shaiman and Scott Wittman
2022-2023	& Juliet	David West Read	Max Martin	
2022-2023	A Beautiful Noise, The Neil Diamond Musical	Anthony McCarten	Neil Diamond	
2022-2023	New York, New York	David Thompson and Sharon Washington	John Kander	Fred Ebb and Lin-Manuel Miranda
2022-2023	Shucked	Robert Horn	Brandy Clark and Shane McAnally	
2023-2024	Suffs	Shaina Taub		
2023-2024	Days of Wine and Roses	Craig Lucas	Adam Guettel	
2023-2024	The Great Gasby	Kait Kerrigan	Jason Howland and Nathan Tysen	
2023-2024	The Outsiders	Adam Rapp and Justin Levine	Jonathan Clay, Zach Chance and Justin Levine	
2023-2024	Water for Elephants	Rick Elice	PigPen Theatre Co.	
2024-2025	Maybe Happy Ending	Hue Park and Will Aronson	Will Aronson	Hue Park
2024-2025	Boop! The Musical	Bob Martin	Susan Birkenhead	David Foster
2024-2025	Death Becomes Her	Marco Pennette	Julia Mattison and Noel Carey	
2024-2025	Operation Mincemeat	David Cumming, Felix Hagan, Natasha Hodgson and Zoë Roberts		
2024-2025	Real Women Have Curves	Lisa Loomer with Nell Benjamin	Joy Huerta and Benjamin Velez	
2025-2026	Schmigadoon!	Cinco Paul		
2025-2026	The Lost Boys	David Hornsby and Chris Hoch	The Rescues	
2025-2026	Two Strangers (Carry a Cake Across New York)	Kit Buchan	Jim Barne	Kit Buchan

== See also ==
- Tony Award for Best Musical
- Drama Desk Award for Outstanding Musical
- Laurence Olivier Award for Best New Musical
- List of Tony Award and Olivier Award winning musicals
- List of Tony Award-nominated productions
