= Susan Stroman =

American theatre director and choreographer

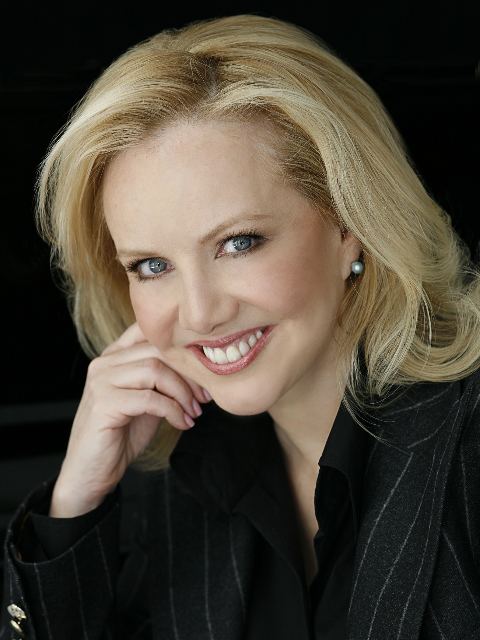
- Stroman in 2007
- Born: October 17, 1954 (age 71); Wilmington, Delaware, U.S.
- Occupations: Choreographer, performer, theatre director
- Years active: 1970s–present
- Spouse: Mike Ockrent (1996–1999, his death)

Susan P. Stroman (born October 17, 1954) is an American theatre director, choreographer, and performer. Her notable theater productions include Oklahoma!, The Music Man, Crazy for You, Contact, The Producers, The Frogs, The Scottsboro Boys, Bullets Over Broadway, POTUS: Or, Behind Every Great Dumbass Are Seven Women Trying to Keep Him Alive, and New York, New York.

She is a five-time Tony Award winner, four for Best Choreography and one as Best Director of a Musical for The Producers. In addition, she is a recipient of two Laurence Olivier Awards, five Drama Desk Awards, eight Outer Critics Circle Awards, two Lucille Lortel Awards, and the George Abbott Award for Lifetime Achievement in the American Theater. She is a 2014 inductee in the American Theater Hall of Fame in New York City.

== Early years ==
Stroman was born in Wilmington, Delaware, the daughter of Frances (née Nolan) and Charles Harry Stroman. She was exposed to show tunes by her piano-playing salesman father. She began studying dance, concentrating on jazz, tap, and ballet at the age of five. She studied under James Jamieson at the Academy of the Dance in Wilmington. She majored in English at the University of Delaware. She performed, choreographed and directed at community theaters in the Delaware and Philadelphia area.

After graduating in 1976, she moved to New York City. Her first professional appearance was in Hit the Deck at the Goodspeed Opera House in 1977. Later that year she was cast in the role of Hunyak in the National tour of Chicago, which marked her first time working with composer John Kander and lyricist Fred Ebb.

Her first Broadway credit was as an ensemble member in the 1979 musical Whoopee!. In 1980 she was assistant director, assistant choreographer, and dance captain for the Broadway show Musical Chairs. Wanting to direct and choreograph instead of perform, Stroman concentrated on creating for the theater. She worked in small venues as a director and choreographer in various industrial shows, club acts and commercials.

== Career ==
=== Theatre ===
==== 1987–2000: Breakthrough ====
Stroman's big break as a choreographer came in 1987 with the Off-Broadway revival of Flora the Red Menace (music by John Kander and Fred Ebb) at the Vineyard Theatre. Her work there was seen by Hal Prince, who hired her to create the dance sequences for his New York City Opera production of Don Giovanni.

Her relationship with Kander and Ebb led to co-creating, along with Scott Ellis and David Thompson, the 1991 hit Off-Broadway musical And the World Goes 'Round. In 1992 she went on to choreograph Liza Stepping Out at Radio City Music Hall starring Liza Minnelli, receiving an Emmy nomination for her work. Later that year she earned her third Broadway credit for her collaboration with director, and then-future husband, Mike Ockrent on Crazy for You. The show won the Tony Award for Best Musical and she won her first Tony Award for Best Choreography.

In 1994, Stroman won her second Tony Award when she collaborated with Prince on a revival of Show Boat, where she used some of her most innovative ideas. She added several dance montages to the show, complete with a revolving door, to help guide the audience through the generations that are covered in the show. Stroman heavily researched the period in which the show takes place and learned that African-Americans are credited for inventing the Charleston. She used that information in designing the montages, as the popular dance is introduced by and eventually appropriated from the black characters. In 1994, Stroman collaborated again with her husband Mike Ockrent on the holiday spectacular A Christmas Carol at Madison Square Garden, which ran for 10 years, and the Broadway musical Big, The Musical (1996). She returned to her collaboration with Kander and Ebb, Ellis and Thompson on the Broadway musical Steel Pier (1997). In 1999, her choreography of Oklahoma!, directed by Trevor Nunn at the Royal National Theatre, won Stroman her second Olivier Award for her outstanding choreography. Stroman's husband Mike Ockrent died from leukemia on December 2, 1999.

She immersed herself in her work and directed and choreographed her first Broadway show as director, the 2000 revival of The Music Man. At the same time, Stroman was approached by Lincoln Center Theater's artistic director André Bishop, who offered assistance with developing the project of her choice. She and John Weidman, who had written the book for Big, began working on what would become the three-part "dance play" Contact, which she choreographed as well as directed. The show opened at Lincoln Center's Mitzi Newhouse Theater in the fall of 1999, and later transferred to the larger Vivian Beaumont Theater, where it was reclassified as a musical. It won the 2000 Tony Award for Best Musical. Stroman won her third Tony Award for best choreography. Contact won a 2003 Emmy Award for Outstanding Classical Music-Dance Program when a live broadcast of the show appeared as an episode of PBS's Live from Lincoln Center. For Lincoln Center Theater, Stroman went on to direct and choreograph Thou Shalt Not (2001) with music by Harry Connick Jr. and The Frogs (2004) with book by Nathan Lane.

==== 2001–present: Established career ====
In 2001, Stroman directed and choreographed the Mel Brooks musical The Producers. Stroman's late husband, Ockrent, had initially been named to direct. It was a commercial success and won a record twelve Tony Awards. Stroman won her fourth and fifth Tony Awards for direction and choreography, becoming the first woman to win both awards in the same night. She was also the second woman ever to win Best Direction of a Musical after Julie Taymor in 1998. In 2005, she made her feature film directorial debut with a film adaptation of the show. The movie was nominated for four Golden Globe Awards.

In 2007, she again collaborated with Brooks, as director and choreographer of the musical Young Frankenstein. In the fall of 2017, she and Brooks opened a newly revised version of the show at the Garrick Theatre in London's West End after a successful tryout at the Theatre Royal in Newcastle.

She directed and choreographed the musical Happiness, which has a book by John Weidman, music by Scott Frankel and lyrics by Michael Korie. The musical opened in February 2009 at the Mitzi E. Newhouse Theater at Lincoln Center.

The musical The Scottsboro Boys opened at the Vineyard Theatre in February 2010. The music is by Kander and Ebb and the book is by David Thompson; Stroman both directed and choreographed. The show later transferred to Broadway where it ran for 49 performances at the Lyceum Theatre and received 12 Tony Award Nominations. Regional theaters such as the Guthrie Theater in Minneapolis, San Diego's Old Globe, American Conservatory Theater in San Francisco, and the Ahmanson Theatre in Los Angeles have all mounted successful productions of the show. In 2013, Stroman directed the UK premiere of the show at the Young Vic in London. After its successful run there, the show transferred to the West End where it was honored with the 2014 Evening Standard's Ned Sherrin Award.

She co-directed with Hal Prince the new musical Paradise Found, which premiered at the Menier Chocolate Factory (London) on May 19, 2010. The cast included Mandy Patinkin, Judy Kaye and Shuler Hensley.

Stroman directed and choreographed the new musical, Big Fish with songs by Andrew Lippa and book by John August. The show, based on the book and film of the same name, opened at the Oriental Theater in Chicago in April and May 2013 and then ran on Broadway in September 2013 to December 2013.

In 2014 she directed and choreographed a production of The Merry Widow for the Metropolitan Opera, starring Renee Fleming in the title role.

Stroman worked with Woody Allen on a musical adaptation of his film Bullets Over Broadway, titled Bullets Over Broadway the Musical, which opened on Broadway in April 2014.

She directed and choreographed the new musical Little Dancer, which ran at the Kennedy Center, Eisenhower Theater from October 25, 2014, to November 30. The book and lyrics are by Lynn Ahrens and music by Stephen Flaherty. In the spring of 2019 she directed and choreographed Marie, Dancing Still for Seattle's 5th Avenue Theatre. A newly reworked and retitled production of Little Dancer, the show starred Tiler Peck reprising her title role alongside Terrence Mann and Louise Pitre.

Stroman collaborated with Prince once again as co-director of a new musical entitled Prince of Broadway, a retrospective of the career and life of Hal Prince. The show has orchestrations and new material written by Jason Robert Brown. The revue premiered in Tokyo at the Tokyu Theatre Orb in October 2015 and then ran in Osaka in November through December 2015, and featured Tony Yazbeck, Ramin Karimloo, Shuler Hensley and Nancy Opel. It premiered on Broadway on August 24, 2017, at the Samuel J. Friedman Theatre as a co-production of the Manhattan Theatre Club and Gorgeous Entertainment. The book is by David Thompson.

In 2016 she returned to the Vineyard Theatre to direct the play Dot, written by Colman Domingo. The following year she directed and choreographed her fourth collaboration with the Vineyard Theatre, The Beast in the Jungle, winning the 2018 Joe Callaway Award for excellence in choreography. The music was composed by John Kander and the book written by David Thompson.

In April 2022, Stroman directed the Broadway play POTUS: Or, Behind Every Great Dumbass Are Seven Women Trying to Keep Him Alive, by Selina Fillinger, at the Shubert Theatre.

Stroman directed and choreographed the Chichester Festival Theatre revival of Crazy for You, which transferred to the West End's Gillian Lynne Theatre in 2023.

Her next projects include the Broadway musical adaptation of the television series Smash and the play Left on Tenth by Delia Ephron.

=== Dance ===
In 2004, Stroman was the first woman to choreograph a full-length ballet for New York City Ballet. Double Feature, with music by Irving Berlin and Walter Donaldson, is now in the New York City Ballet repertory.

Stroman had previously worked with New York City Ballet in 1999, when she created Blossom Got Kissed, featuring the music of Duke Ellington, to celebrate the company's 50th Anniversary season. She later revisited the piece, choreographing three additional short dances to be performed alongside the original. This new expanded ballet entitled For the Love of Duke premiered in May 2011.

In 1997 she created But Not for Me for the Martha Graham Company, using the music of George Gershwin.

The world premiere of Take Five…More Or Less with The Pacific Northwest Ballet opened in 2008. Stroman combined jazz music by Dave Brubeck and classical pointe work. The ballet is now in their repertoire.

=== Television ===
She appeared as herself in Season Four of the HBO series Curb Your Enthusiasm, directing Larry David and David Schwimmer in a production of the Broadway hit musical The Producers. In 2017 she returned to the show, choreographing Larry David's musical Fatwa!, starring Lin-Manuel Miranda as Salman Rushdie.

She has also made multiple appearances as herself on the Food Network's Barefoot Contessa program, as she is a close friend of its host, Ina Garten.

=== Film ===
Stroman received the American Choreography Award for her work on Columbia Pictures' film Center Stage (2000). In 2005, she directed the film version of The Producers.

== Stage productions ==
Theater

- 1980 Musical Chairs (1980 Musical) (Assistant Director/Choreographer) (Broadway)
- 1987 Flora the Red Menace (Choreographer) (Off-Broadway)
- 1989 Don Giovanni (Choreographer) (New York City Opera)
- 1990 A Little Night Music (Choreographer) (New York City Opera)
- 1991 And The World Goes 'Round (Choreographer) (Off-Broadway)
- 1992 Liza Minnelli – Stepping Out At Radio City (Choreographer)
- 1992 110 in the Shade (Choreographer) (New York City Opera)
- 1992 Crazy for You (Choreographer) (Broadway)
- 1993 Crazy for You (Choreographer) (West End)
- 1994 Show Boat (Choreographer) (Toronto/Broadway)
- 1994 Picnic (Choreographer of Musical Interludes) (Broadway)
- 1994 A Christmas Carol (Choreographer) (Madison Square Garden)
- 1996 Big (Choreographer) (Broadway)
- 1997 Steel Pier (Choreographer) (Broadway)
- 1998 Show Boat (Choreographer) (West End)
- 1998 Oklahoma! (Choreographer) (West End)
- 1999 Contact (Director/Choreographer) (Off-Broadway) (Mitzi E. Newhouse Theater at Lincoln Center Theater)
- 2000 The Music Man (Director/Choreographer) (Broadway)
- 2000 Contact (Director/Choreographer) (Broadway) (Vivian Beaumont Theater at Lincoln Center Theater)
- 2001 The Producers (Director/Choreographer) (Broadway)
- 2001 Thou Shalt Not (Director/Choreographer/creator) (Broadway) (Lincoln Center Theater)
- 2002 Oklahoma! (Choreographer) (Broadway)
- 2002 Contact (Director/Choreographer) (West End)
- 2004 The Frogs (Director/Choreographer) (Broadway) (Vivian Beaumont Theater at Lincoln Center Theater)
- 2004 The Producers (Director/Choreographer) (West End)
- 2005 Dedication or The Stuff of Dreams (Choreographer of Musical Interludes) (Off-Broadway)
- 2007 Young Frankenstein (Director/Choreographer) (Broadway)
- 2008 Happiness (Director/Choreographer) (Off-Broadway) (Mitzi E. Newhouse Theater at Lincoln Center Theater)
- 2010 The Scottsboro Boys (Director/Choreographer) (Off-Broadway) (Vineyard Theatre)
- 2010 Paradise Found (Co-director/Choreographer) (Menier Chocolate Factory)
- 2010 The Scottsboro Boys (Director/Choreographer) (Broadway) (Lyceum Theatre)
- 2013 Big Fish (Director/Choreographer) (Broadway) (Neil Simon Theatre)
- 2014 Bullets Over Broadway (Director/Choreographer) (Broadway) (St. James Theatre)
- 2014 Little Dancer (Director/Choreographer) Kennedy Center
- 2015 The Last Two People on Earth: An Apocalyptic Vaudeville (Director/Choreographer) (Off-Broadway)
- 2015 Prince of Broadway (Co-director/Choreographer) Tokyo
- 2016 Dot (Director) (Off-Broadway) (Vineyard Theatre)
- 2017 Prince of Broadway (Co-director/Choreographer) (Broadway) (Manhattan Theater Club)
- 2017 Young Frankenstein (Director/Choreographer) (West End)
- 2018 Beast in the Jungle (Director/Choreographer) (Off-Broadway) (Vineyard Theater)
- 2019 Marie, Dancing Still (Director/Choreographer) (Seattle's 5th Avenue Theatre)
- 2022 POTUS: Or, Behind Every Great Dumbass Are Seven Women Trying to Keep Him Alive (Director) (Broadway) (Shubert Theatre)
- 2023 Crazy for You (Director/Choreographer) (West End transfer after a run at the Chichester Festival in 2022) (Gillian Lynne Theatre)
- 2023 New York, New York: A New Musical (Director/Choreographer) (Broadway) (St. James Theatre)
- 2024 Left on Tenth (Director) (Broadway) (James Earl Jones Theatre)
- 2025 Smash (Director) (Broadway) (Imperial Theatre)

Dance

- 1997 But Not for Me (Martha Graham Company)
- 1999 Blossom Got Kissed (New York City Ballet)
- 2004 Double Feature: The Blue Necklace and Makin' Whoopee (New York City Ballet)
- 2008 Take Five...More or Less (Pacific Northwest Ballet)
- 2011 For the Love of Duke (New York City Ballet)

Opera

- 2014 The Merry Widow (Director/Choreographer) (The Metropolitan Opera)
- 2015 The Merry Widow (Director/Choreographer) (The Lyric Opera of Chicago)

== Accolades ==
Year	Association	Category	Nominated work	Result	Ref.
1991	Drama Desk Award	Outstanding Choreography	And the World Goes 'Round	Nominated	
1991	Outer Critics Circle Award	Outstanding Choreography	And the World Goes 'Round	Won	
1992	Tony Award	Best Choreography	Crazy For You	Won	
1992	Drama Desk Award	Outstanding Choreography	Crazy For You	Won	
1992	Outer Critics Circle Award	Outstanding Choreography	Crazy For You	Won	
1993	Laurence Olivier Award	Best Theatre Choreographer	Crazy For You	Won	
1993	Primetime Emmy Award	Outstanding Individual Achievement in Choreography	Liza Minnelli Live from Radio City Music Hall	Nominated	
1995	Tony Award	Best Choreography	Show Boat	Won	
1995	Outer Critics Circle Award	Outstanding Choreography	Show Boat	Won	
1995	Outer Critics Circle Award	Outstanding Choreography	A Christmas Carol	Won	
1996	Tony Award	Best Choreography	Big	Nominated	
1997	Tony Award	Best Choreography	Steel Pier	Nominated	
1997	Drama Desk Award	Outstanding Choreography	Steel Pier	Nominated	
1997	Outer Critics Circle Award	Outstanding Choreography	Steel Pier	Nominated	
1999	Laurence Olivier Award	Best Theatre Choreographer	Oklahoma!	Won	
2000	Tony Award	Best Direction of a Musical	Contact	Nominated	
2000	Tony Award	Best Direction of a Musical	The Music Man	Nominated	
2000	Tony Award	Best Choreography	The Music Man	Nominated	
2000	Tony Award	Best Choreography	Contact	Won	
2000	Drama Desk Award	Outstanding Director of a Musical	Contact	Nominated	
2000	Drama Desk Award	Outstanding Director of a Musical	The Music Man	Nominated	
2000	Drama Desk Award	Outstanding Choreography	The Music Man	Nominated	
2000	Drama Desk Award	Outstanding Choreography	Contact	Won	
2000	Outer Critics Circle Award	Outstanding Director of a Musical	Contact	Won	
2000	Outer Critics Circle Award	Outstanding Director of a Musical	The Music Man	Won	
2000	Outer Critics Circle Award	Outstanding Choreography	The Music Man	Won	
2000	Outer Critics Circle Award	Outstanding Choreography	Contact	Won	
2000	American Choreography Awards	Outstanding Achievement in Feature Film	Center Stage	Won	
2001	Tony Award	Best Direction of a Musical	The Producers	Won	
2001	Tony Award	Best Choreography	The Producers	Won	
2001	Drama Desk Award	Outstanding Director of a Musical	The Producers	Won	
2001	Drama Desk Award	Outstanding Choreography	The Producers	Won	
2001	Outer Critics Circle Award	Outstanding Director of a Musical	The Producers	Won	
2001	Outer Critics Circle Award	Outstanding Choreography	The Producers	Won	
2002	Tony Award	Best Choreography	Oklahoma!	Nominated	
2002	Drama Desk Award	Outstanding Choreography	Oklahoma!	Won	
2002	Outer Critics Circle Award	Outstanding Choreography	Oklahoma!	Won	
2008	Drama Desk Award	Outstanding Choreography	Young Frankenstein	Nominated	
2008	Outer Critics Circle Award	Outstanding Director of a Musical	Young Frankenstein	Nominated	
2008	Outer Critics Circle Award	Outstanding Choreographer	Young Frankenstein	Nominated	
2009	Outer Critics Circle Award	Outstanding Direction of a Musical	Happiness	Nominated	
2009	Outer Critics Circle Award	Outstanding Choreography	Happiness	Nominated	
2010	Drama Desk Award	Outstanding Director of a Musical	The Scottsboro Boys	Nominated	
2010	Drama Desk Award	Outstanding Choreography	The Scottsboro Boys	Nominated	
2010	Outer Critics Circle Award	Outstanding Direction of a Musical	The Scottsboro Boys	Nominated	
2010	Outer Critics Circle Award	Outstanding Choreographer	The Scottsboro Boys	Nominated	
2011	Tony Award	Best Direction of a Musical	The Scottsboro Boys	Nominated	
2011	Tony Award	Best Choreography	The Scottsboro Boys	Nominated	
2011	Astaire Award	Outstanding Choreographer in a Broadway Show	The Scottsboro Boys	Won	
2011	Drama League Award	Julia Hansen Award for Excellence in Directing		Won	
2014	Tony Award	Best Choreography	Bullets Over Broadway	Nominated	
2014	Drama Desk Award	Outstanding Director of a Musical	Bullets Over Broadway	Nominated	
2014	Drama Desk Award	Outstanding Choreography	Bullets Over Broadway	Nominated	
2014	Outer Critics Circle Award	Outstanding Choreographer	Bullets Over Broadway	Nominated	
2014	Astaire Award	Outstanding Choreographer in a Broadway Show	Bullets Over Broadway	Nominated	
2014	Astaire Award	Outstanding Choreographer in a Broadway Show	Big Fish	Nominated	
2023	Tony Award	Best Choreography	New York, New York	Nominated	
2023	Drama League Award	Outstanding Direction of a Musical	New York, New York	Nominated	
2023	Outer Critics Circle Award	Outstanding Director of a Musical	New York, New York	Nominated	
2023	Outer Critics Circle Award	Outstanding Choreography	New York, New York	Nominated	
2023	Chita Rivera Awards	Outstanding Choreography in a Broadway Show	New York, New York	Nominated	
2023	Drama Desk Award	Outstanding Choreography	New York, New York	Nominated	

Stroman received the Oscar Hammerstein Award for Lifetime Achievement in Musical Theatre for 2018, presented by the York Theatre Company. Other notable awards include Glamour Magazine's Woman of the Year Award (2001), The George Abbott Award for Lifetime Achievement in the American Theater (2002), and the Sackler Center First Award (2012) honoring extraordinary women who are first in their field.

She is a 2002 New York Public Library "Library Lion" inductee for Outstanding Achievement in Art, Culture, Letters and Scholarship and a 2014 inductee into New York City's Theater Hall of Fame.

In 2005 Stroman received an Honorary Doctorate of Humane Letters from the University of Delaware.
