= Prince of Broadway =

- Music: Various
- Lyrics: Various
- Book: David Thompson
- Premiere: October 23, 2015: Japan
- Productions: 2015 Japan; 2017 Broadway

Prince of Broadway is a musical revue showcasing the producing career of Harold Prince. Prince himself directed the production, his final Broadway credit.

The show features a book by two-time Tony Award nominee David Thompson and is co-directed and choreographed by five-time Tony winner Susan Stroman. Jason Robert Brown is the musical's arranger, musical director, and orchestrator.

The musical premiered in October 2015 in Japan and made its Broadway debut on August 3, 2017 at the Manhattan Theatre Club's Samuel J. Friedman Theatre.

== Background ==
The Broadway premiere was announced in March 2012 for November 2012 but did not get a full-scale production due to lack of funding until late 2015 when it opened in Tokyo, Japan. Two teams of producers tried and failed to raise the show's projected $13 million budget for Broadway. Much of the pre-Broadway cast was replaced.

The musical was originally supposed to open in Toronto and New York in 2012 until its lead producer abandoned the project. A replacement set of producers was announced in May 2012, with a target date of fall 2013 for Broadway.

== Productions ==
Umeda Arts Theater Co., Ltd presented the revue in a limited engagement at Tokyu Theatre Orb in Tokyo, Japan. The production ran from October 23 until November 22, 2015. The production then transferred to Osaka, Japan where it played the Umeda Arts Theater's Main Hall from November 28 until December 10, 2015.

The Manhattan Theatre Club and Gorgeous Entertainment presented the revue and began previews at the Samuel J. Friedman Theatre on August 3, 2017, prior to an August 24, 2017 opening night. The cast included Chuck Cooper, Janet Dacal, Bryonha Marie Parham, Emily Skinner, Brandon Uranowitz, Kaley Ann Voorhees, Michael Xavier, Tony Yazbeck, and Karen Ziemba. The creative team included Harold Prince, Susan Stroman, David Thompson, Jason Robert Brown, William Ivey Long, Beowulf Boritt, Howell Binkley, Jon Weston, Paul Huntley, and Angelina Avallone.

== Musical numbers ==
=== Japan 2015 (incomplete list) ===
Source: Theatre-Orb (incomplete list)

(Note: all productions were originally produced on Broadway unless where noted. Songwriters are listed as (music/lyrics). What Prince was to the production is given below, as well as theaters production was originally played in and dates said production originally opened and closed given.)

Act I

- "All I Need Is One Good Break" (from Flora the Red Menace) (John Kander/Fred Ebb) (billed as "producer Harold Prince"; Neil Simon Theatre (then the Alvin Theatre); May 11, 1965 – July 24, 1965)
- "Heart" (from Damn Yankees) (Richard Adler/Jerry Ross) (billed as "producer Harold S. Prince"; Richard Rodgers Theatre (then the 46th Street Theatre); May 5, 1955 – October 12, 1957)
- "Whatever Lola Wants" (from Damn Yankees) (Adler/Ross) (billed as "producer Harold S. Prince"; Richard Rodgers Theatre; May 5, 1955 – October 12, 1957)
- "Something's Coming" (from West Side Story) (Leonard Bernstein/Stephen Sondheim) (billed as "producer Harold S. Prince"; Winter Garden Theatre; September 25, 1957 – June 27, 1959)
- "Tonight" (from West Side Story) (Bernstein/Sondheim) (billed as "producer Harold S. Prince"; Winter Garden Theatre; September 25, 1957 – June 27, 1959)
- "Tonight at Eight" (from She Loves Me) (Jerry Bock/Sheldon Harnick) (billed as "director and producer Harold Prince"; Eugene O'Neill Theatre; April 23, 1963 – January 11, 1964)
- "Will He Like Me? " (from She Loves Me) (Bock/Harnick) (billed as "director and producer Harold Prince"; Eugene O'Neill Theatre; April 23, 1963 – January 11, 1964)
- "You've Got Possibilities" (from It's a Bird...It's a Plane...It's Superman) (Charles Strouse/Lee Adams) (billed as "producer Harold Prince"; Neil Simon Theatre; March 29, 1966 – July 17, 1966)
- "Beautiful Girls" (from Follies) (Sondheim) (billed as "director and producer Harold Prince"; Winter Garden Theatre; April 4, 1971 – July 1, 1972)
- "Waiting for the Girls Upstairs" (from Follies) (Sondheim) (billed as "director and producer Harold Prince"; Winter Garden Theatre; April 4, 1971 – July 1, 1972)
- "The Right Girl" (from Follies) (Sondheim) (billed as "director and producer Harold Prince"; Winter Garden Theatre; April 4, 1971 – July 1, 1972)
- "Send in the Clowns" (from A Little Night Music) (Sondheim) (billed as "director and producer Harold Prince"; Shubert Theatre; February 25, 1973 – August 3, 1974)
- "If I Were a Rich Man" (from Fiddler on the Roof) (Bock/Harnick) (billed as "producer Harold Prince"; Imperial Theatre; September 22, 1964 – July 2, 1972)
- "Willkommen" (from Cabaret) (Kander/Ebb) (billed as "director and producer Harold Prince"; Broadhurst Theatre; November 20, 1966 – September 6, 1969)
- "If You Could See Her" (from Cabaret) (Kander/Ebb) (billed as "director and producer Harold Prince"; Broadhurst Theatre; November 20, 1966 – September 6, 1969)
- "So What? " (from Cabaret) (Kander/Ebb) (billed as "director and producer Harold Prince"; Broadhurst Theatre; November 20, 1966 – September 6, 1969)
- "Cabaret" (from Cabaret) (Kander/Ebb) (billed as "director and producer Harold Prince"; Broadhurst Theatre; November 20, 1966 – September 6, 1969)

Act II

- "Company" (from Company) (Sondheim) (billed as "director and producer Harold Prince"; Neil Simon Theatre; April 26, 1970 – January 1, 1972)
- "Don't Cry for Me Argentina" (from Evita) (Andrew Lloyd Webber/Tim Rice) (billed as "director Harold Prince": WEST END: Prince Edward Theatre, June 21, 1978 – February 18, 1986; BROADWAY: Broadway Theatre (53rd Street), September 25, 1979 – June 26, 1983)
- "Broadway Baby" (from Follies) (Sondheim) (billed as "director and producer Harold Prince"; Winter Garden Theatre; April 4, 1971 – July 1, 1972)
- "Dressing Them Up" (from Kiss of the Spider Woman) (Kander/Ebb) (billed as "director Harold Prince"; WEST END: Shaftesbury Theatre, October 20, 1992 – July 17, 1993; BROADWAY: Broadhurst Theatre; May 3, 1993 – July 1, 1995)
- "Kiss of the Spider Woman" (from Kiss of the Spider Woman) (Kander/Ebb) (billed as "director Harold Prince"; WEST END: Shaftesbury Theatre, October 20, 1992 – July 17, 1993; BROADWAY: Broadhurst Theatre; May 3, 1993 – July 1, 1995)
- "The Ballad of Sweeney Todd" (from Sweeney Todd) (Sondheim) (billed as "director Harold Prince"; Gershwin Theatre (then the Uris Theatre); March 1, 1979 – June 29, 1980)
- "Can't Help Lovin’ That Man" (from Show Boat) (Jerome Kern/Oscar Hammerstein II) (billed as "director Harold Prince"; Gershwin Theatre; October 2, 1994 – January 5, 1997)
- "The Phantom of the Opera" (from The Phantom of the Opera) (Lloyd Webber/Charles Hart/Richard Stilgoe/Mike Batt) (billed as "director Harold Prince"; WEST END: Her Majesty's Theatre, October 9, 1986; BROADWAY: Majestic Theatre; January 26, 1988)
- "Wishing You Were Somehow Here Again" (from The Phantom of the Opera) (Lloyd Webber/Hart/Stilgoe) (billed as "director Harold Prince"; WEST END: Her Majesty's Theatre, October 9, 1986; BROADWAY: Majestic Theatre; January 26, 1988)
- "The Music of the Night" (from The Phantom of the Opera) (Lloyd Webber/Hart/Stilgoe) (billed as "director Harold Prince"; WEST END: Her Majesty's Theatre, October 9, 1986; BROADWAY: Majestic Theatre; January 26, 1988)

=== Broadway 2017 ===
Act I

Overture

- "Heart" (from Damn Yankees) (Richard Adler/Jerry Ross) (billed as "producer Harold S. Prince"; Richard Rodgers Theatre (then the 46th Street Theatre); May 5, 1955 – October 12, 1957)
- "Something's Coming (Intro Only)/Tonight" (from West Side Story) (Leonard Bernstein/Stephen Sondheim) (billed as "producer Harold S. Prince"; Winter Garden Theatre; September 25, 1957 – June 27, 1959)
- "Tonight at Eight" (from She Loves Me) (Jerry Bock/Sheldon Harnick) (billed as "director and producer Harold Prince"; Eugene O'Neill Theatre; April 23, 1963 – January 11, 1964)
- "Will He Like Me? " (from She Loves Me) (Bock/Harnick) (billed as "director and producer Harold Prince"; Eugene O'Neill Theatre; April 23, 1963 – January 11, 1964)
- "You've Got Possibilities" (from It's a Bird...It's a Plane...It's Superman) (Charles Strouse/Lee Adams) (billed as "producer Harold Prince"; Neil Simon Theatre (then the Alvin Theatre); March 29, 1966 – July 17, 1966)
- "The Right Girl" (from Follies) (Sondheim) (billed as "director and producer Harold Prince"; Winter Garden Theatre; April 4, 1971 – July 1, 1972)
- "If I Were a Rich Man" (from Fiddler on the Roof) (Bock/Harnick) (billed as "producer Harold Prince"; Imperial Theatre; September 22, 1964 – July 2, 1972)
- "Cabaret" (from Cabaret) (John Kander/Fred Ebb) (billed as "director and producer Harold Prince"; Broadhurst Theatre; November 20, 1966 – September 6, 1969)
- "So What? " (from Cabaret) (Kander/Ebb) (billed as "director and producer Harold Prince"; Broadhurst Theatre; November 20, 1966 – September 6, 1969)

Act II

- Company Prelude (from Company) (Sondheim) (billed as "director and producer Harold Prince"; Neil Simon Theatre; April 26, 1970 – January 1, 1972)
- "Ladies Who Lunch" (from Company) (Sondheim) (billed as "director and producer Harold Prince"; Neil Simon Theatre; April 26, 1970 – January 1, 1972)
- "Being Alive" (from Company) (Sondheim) (billed as "director and producer Harold Prince"; Neil Simon Theatre; April 26, 1970 – January 1, 1972)
- "Don't Cry for Me Argentina" (from Evita) (Andrew Lloyd Webber/Tim Rice) (billed as "director Harold Prince": WEST END: Prince Edward Theatre, June 21, 1978 – February 18, 1986; BROADWAY: Broadway Theatre (53rd Street), September 25, 1979 – June 26, 1983)
- "Ol' Man River" (from Show Boat) (Jerome Kern/Oscar Hammerstein II) (billed as "director Harold Prince"; Gershwin Theatre; October 2, 1994 – January 5, 1997)
- "Now You Know" (from Merrily We Roll Along) (Sondheim) (billed as "director and producer Harold Prince"; Neil Simon Theatre; November 16, 1981 – November 28, 1981)
- "This Is Not Over Yet" (from Parade) (Jason Robert Brown) (billed as "director Harold Prince"; Vivian Beaumont Theater; December 17, 1998 – February 28, 1999)
- "Dressing Them Up" (from Kiss of the Spider Woman) (Kander/Ebb) (billed as "director Harold Prince"; WEST END: Shaftesbury Theatre, October 20, 1992 – July 17, 1993; BROADWAY: Broadhurst Theatre; May 3, 1993 – July 1, 1995)
- "The Worst Pies In London" (from Sweeney Todd) (Sondheim) (billed as "director Harold Prince"; Gershwin Theatre (then the Uris Theatre); March 1, 1979 – June 29, 1980)
- "Wishing You Were Somehow Here Again" (from The Phantom of the Opera) (Lloyd Webber/Charles Hart/Richard Stilgoe) (billed as "director Harold Prince"; WEST END: Her Majesty's Theatre, October 9, 1986; BROADWAY: Majestic Theatre; January 26, 1988)
- "The Music of the Night" (from The Phantom of the Opera) (Lloyd Webber/Hart/Stilgoe) (billed as "director Harold Prince"; WEST END: Her Majesty's Theatre, October 9, 1986; BROADWAY: Majestic Theatre; January 26, 1988)
- Do The Work

== Original cast ==
Cancelled Broadway Premiere (2012)	Japan (2015)	Broadway (2017)
Sebastian Arcelus; Sierra Boggess; Daniel Breaker; Josh Grisetti; Shuler Hensley; Richard Kind; Amanda Kloots-Larsen; LaChanze; Linda Lavin; Caroline O'Connor; David Pittu; Emily Skinner	Josh Grisetti; Shuler Hensley; Masachika Ichimura (voiceover); Ramin Karimloo; Nancy Opel; Bryonha Marie Parham; Emily Skinner; Mariand Torres; Kaley Ann Voorhees; Tony Yazbeck; Reon Yuzuki	Chuck Cooper; Janet Dacal; Bryonha Marie Parham; Emily Skinner; Brandon Uranowitz; Kaley Ann Voorhees; Michael Xavier; Tony Yazbeck; Karen Ziemba

== Awards and nominations ==
Year	Award Ceremony	Category	Nominee	Result
2018	Drama Desk Award	Outstanding Featured Actor in a Musical	Tony Yazbeck	Nominated
2018	Outer Critics Circle Award	Outstanding New Broadway Musical		Nominated
2018	Outer Critics Circle Award	Outstanding Featured Actor in a Musical	Tony Yazbeck	Nominated
2018	Outer Critics Circle Award	Outstanding Featured Actress in a Musical	Emily Skinner	Nominated
2018	Outer Critics Circle Award	Outstanding Orchestrations	Jason Robert Brown	Nominated
