= Umeda Arts Theater =

Theater in Japan

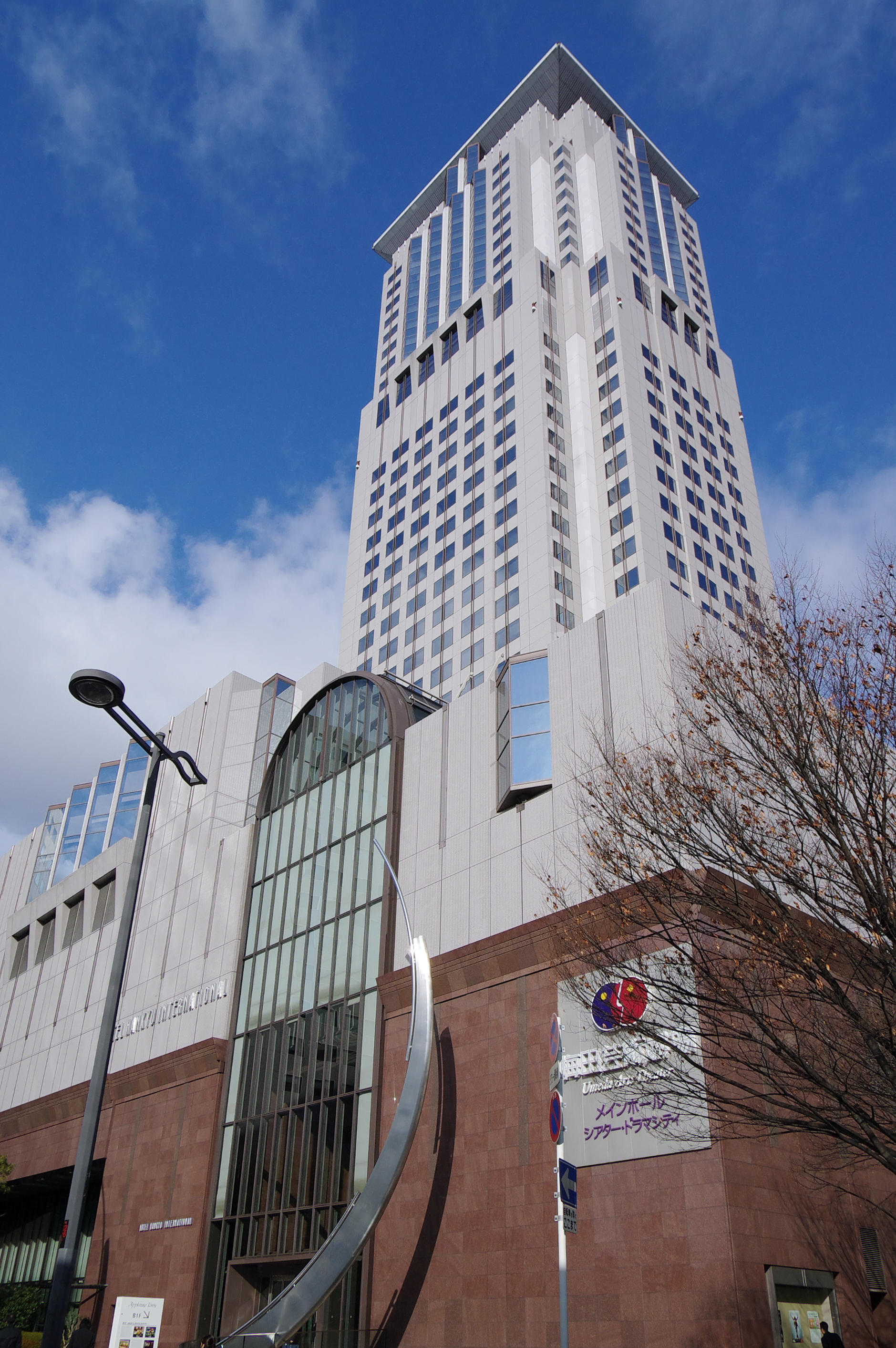
- Interactive map of Umeda Arts Theater
- Location: Chayamachi, Kita-ku, Osaka
- Coordinates: 34°42′31″N 135°29′55″E
- Seating type: Reserved seating
- Capacity: 1,905
- Type: Indoor theatre

Construction
- Built: 1990
- Opened: 1992

Website
- umegei.com

Umeda Arts Theater (梅田芸術劇場, Umeda Geijutsu Gekijō) is a Japanese theater located at Chayamachi Applause in Chayamachi, Kita-ku, Osaka, operated by Umeda Arts Theater Co., Ltd. It opened in 1992.

Umeda Arts Theater Co., Ltd. is a member of Hankyu Hanshin Toho Group and a subsidiary of Hankyu Corporation. It serves as a theater producing company and a talent agency for former Takarazuka Revue Company stars, with branches in Tokyo and New York. Umeda Arts Theater has produced the world premiere of Prince of Broadway, a musical retrospective celebrating the 21-time Tony Award winner Harold Prince, directed by Prince and Susan Stroman.

== Venues ==
- Main Hall: 1,905 seats
- Theater Drama City: 898 seats

== Access ==
- Hankyu Umeda Station – approx. 3 minutes from Chayamachiguchi Gate on foot
- JR West Osaka Station – approx. 8 minutes from Midosuji North Gate on foot
- Osaka Municipal Subway
  - Midosuji Line – approx. 5 minutes from Exit 1 of Umeda Station on foot, approx. 4 minutes from Exit 4 of Nakatsu Station
  - Tanimachi Line – approx. 7 minutes from Exit 1 of Higashi-Umeda Station on foot
  - Yotsubashi Line – approx. 11 minutes from Exit 3 of Nishi-Umeda Station on foot
- Hanshin Umeda Station – approx. 10 minutes from East Exit on foot
