= New York, New York (musical) =

2023 musical by John Kander and Fred Ebb

- Broadway Playbill cover
- Music: John Kander
- Lyrics: Fred Ebb
- Book: David Thompson; Sharon Washington
- Basis: New York, New York by: Earl Mac Rauch; Mardik Martin
- Premiere: April 26, 2023: St. James Theatre, New York City
- Productions: 2023 Broadway

New York, New York is a musical with music by John Kander, lyrics by Fred Ebb and Lin-Manuel Miranda, and a book by David Thompson and Sharon Washington. Inspired by and loosely based on the 1977 film of the same name by Martin Scorsese, the musical premiered on Broadway on April 26, 2023.

Despite receiving mixed to mostly dismal reviews and becoming a commercial disappointment, the Broadway production, directed and choreographed by Susan Stroman, received nine nominations at the 76th Tony Awards, including Best Musical, winning one award for Best Scenic Design in a Musical.

== Production history ==
=== Broadway (2023) ===
The musical had its world premiere at the St. James Theatre on Broadway with the first preview occurring on March 24, 2023. The cast, which was announced on February 1 of the same year, included Clyde Alves, Emily Skinner, and Janet Dacal. It officially opened on April 26, 2023, and closed on July 30, 2023, having played 33 previews and 110 regular performances.

The production was nominated for nine Tony Awards at the 76th Tony Awards including Best Musical and Best Book of a Musical, winning the award for Best Scenic Design in a Musical.

Set of New York, New York Broadway musical in April 2023

== Cast and characters ==
Character	Broadway
Character	2023
Jimmy Doyle	Colton Ryan
Francine Evans	Anna Uzele
Tommy Caggiano	Clyde Alves
Jesse Webb	John Clay III
Sofia Diaz	Janet Dacal
Gordon Kendrick	Ben Davis
Alex Mann	Oliver Prose
Mateo Diaz	Angel Sigala
Madame Constance Veltri	Emily Skinner

== Musical numbers ==
Act I

- "Morning in New York" – Orchestra
- "Cheering for Me Now" – Company
- "A Major Chord" – Jimmy and Tommy
- "New York in Summer" – Orchestra
- "Better Than Before" – Madame Veltri
- "One of the Smart Ones" – Francine
- "Gold" – Mateo and Sofia
- "Wine and Peaches" – Tommy, Jimmy, and Construction Workers
- "I Love Music" – Jimmy and Francine
- "My Own Music" – Jesse, Mateo, and Company
- "I'm What's Happening Now" – Francine and Waiters
- "New York in the Rain" – Orchestra
- "A Simple Thing Like That" – Madame Veltri and Alex
- "Can You Hear Me?" – Jimmy
- "Happy Endings/Let's Hear it for Me" – Francine and Company
- "New York in the Snow" – Orchestra
- "Marry Me" – Jimmy

Act II

- "Along Comes Love" – Francine, Jimmy, and Radio Singers
- "San Juan Supper Club" – Jimmy, Mateo, Jesse, and Company
- "Quiet Thing" – Jimmy
- "A Simple Thing Like That" (Reprise) – Alex and Jimmy†
- "New York At Night" – Orchestra
- "Opera in New York" – Company‡
- "Sorry I Asked" – Jimmy
- "But the World Goes 'Round" – Francine
- "New York Concierto" – Orchestra
- "Music, Money, Love" – Jimmy
- "Light" – Jesse and Company
- "New York, New York" – Francine
- Bows/"New York, New York" (Reprise) – Company≠

Notes:

† - Not included on the cast recording

‡ - Titled "A Quell'Amor" on the cast recording

≠ - Not included on the cast recording but there is an included instrumental version as a bonus track

=== Cast Recording ===
On May 8, it was announced that the production would release a cast recording, which was released on June 23, 2023. The recording also features five original demo recordings of "Can You Hear Me?" "Along Comes Love," "Wine and Peaches," and "New York, New York" by Lin-Manuel Miranda, John Kander, and Fred Ebb as well as an instrumental version of the title song.

== Reception ==
The Broadway production received mixed to negative reviews from critics. As of May 2, 2023, the theatre review aggregator Did They Like It? includes 14 reviews of the show, of which one is categorized as positive, six are categorized as mixed, and seven are categorized as negative.

Writing in The New York Times, Elisabeth Vincentelli called the show "sprawling, unwieldy, [and] surprisingly dull", and criticized the new songs written for the production, saying they "lack Kander and Ebb's serrated edge". Greg Evans of Deadline Hollywood praised the cast, particularly Ryan, but called the rest of the show "overstuffed" and criticized David Thompson and Sharon Washington's book as "predictable [and] cliché-loaded". At Time Out New York, Adam Feldman gave the production three stars out five, writing that a number featuring "a tap bonanza for workers balanced on the beams of an uncompleted skyscraper" was "as good a metaphor as any for the musical as a whole", concluding, "there's a lot to enjoy if you don't look down".

Robert Hofler of TheWrap was more positive, calling the first act "confused" but writing that the show "ultimately delivers its melting-pot message with intelligence, style and, yes, good old-fashioned razzle-dazzle".

== Awards and nominations ==
=== 2023 Broadway production ===
Year	Award	Category	Nominee	Result
2023	Tony Awards	Best Musical		Nominated
2023	Tony Awards	Best Book of a Musical	David Thompson & Sharon Washington	Nominated
2023	Tony Awards	Best Performance by a Leading Actor in a Musical	Colton Ryan	Nominated
2023	Tony Awards	Best Scenic Design of a Musical	Beowulf Boritt	Won
2023	Tony Awards	Best Costume Design of a Musical	Donna Zakowska	Nominated
2023	Tony Awards	Best Lighting Design of a Musical	Ken Billington	Nominated
2023	Tony Awards	Best Sound Design of a Musical	Kai Harada	Nominated
2023	Tony Awards	Best Choreography	Susan Stroman	Nominated
2023	Tony Awards	Best Orchestrations	Daryl Waters & Sam Davis	Nominated
2023	Drama Desk Awards	Outstanding Lead Performance in a Musical	Anna Uzele	Nominated
2023	Drama Desk Awards	Outstanding Scenic Design of a Musical	Beowulf Boritt	Won
2023	Drama Desk Awards	Outstanding Costume Design of a Musical	Donna Zakowska	Nominated
2023	Drama Desk Awards	Outstanding Lighting Design for a Musical	Ken Billington	Nominated
2023	Drama Desk Awards	Outstanding Choreography	Susan Stroman	Nominated
2023	Drama Desk Awards	Outstanding Orchestrations	Daryl Waters and Sam Davis	Nominated
2023	Drama League Awards	Distinguished Performance Award	Colton Ryan	Nominated
2023	Drama League Awards	Distinguished Performance Award	Anna Uzele	Nominated
2023	Drama League Awards	Outstanding Production of a Musical		Nominated
2023	Drama League Awards	Outstanding Direction of a Musical	Susan Stroman	Nominated
2023	Outer Critics Circle Awards	Outstanding New Broadway Musical		Nominated
2023	Outer Critics Circle Awards	Outstanding New Score	John Kander and Lin-Manuel Miranda	Nominated
2023	Outer Critics Circle Awards	Outstanding Director of a Musical	Susan Stroman	Nominated
2023	Outer Critics Circle Awards	Outstanding Lead Performer in a Broadway Musical	Colton Ryan	Nominated
2023	Outer Critics Circle Awards	Outstanding Lead Performer in a Broadway Musical	Anna Uzele	Nominated
2023	Outer Critics Circle Awards	Outstanding Scenic Design	Beowulf Boritt	Won
2023	Outer Critics Circle Awards	Outstanding Costume Design	Donna Zakowska	Nominated
2023	Outer Critics Circle Awards	Outstanding Lighting Design	Ken Billington	Nominated
2023	Outer Critics Circle Awards	Outstanding Sound Design	Kai Harada	Nominated
2023	Outer Critics Circle Awards	Outstanding Projection Design	Christopher Ash and Beowulf Boritt	Nominated
2023	Outer Critics Circle Awards	Outstanding Orchestrations	Sam Davis and Daryl Waters	Nominated
2023	Outer Critics Circle Awards	Outstanding Choreography	Susan Stroman	Won
2023	Chita Rivera Awards	Outstanding Choreography in a Broadway Show	Susan Stroman	Nominated
2023	Chita Rivera Awards	Outstanding Ensemble in a Broadway Show		Won
2023	Chita Rivera Awards	Outstanding Dancer in a Broadway Show	Clyde Alves	Nominated
