= Kander and Ebb =

American songwriting team

Kander and Ebb were an American songwriting team consisting of composer John Kander (born March 18, 1927) and lyricist Fred Ebb (April 8, 1928 – September 11, 2004). Known primarily for their stage musicals, which include Cabaret and Chicago, Kander and Ebb also scored several movies, including Martin Scorsese's New York, New York. Their most famous song is the theme song of that movie. Recorded by many artists, "New York, New York" became a signature song for Frank Sinatra. The team also became associated with two actresses, Liza Minnelli and Chita Rivera, for whom they wrote a considerable amount of material for the stage, concerts and television.

== History ==
John Kander and Fred Ebb were introduced by their mutual music publisher Tommy Valando in 1962. Kander and Ebb met at Ebb's apartment and decided to test their compatibility as writing partners with a "mock title song" for a musical comedy already running on Broadway, a Hal Prince production called Take Her, She's Mine. As James Leve remarks in his book Kander and Ebb (2009), "The turning point in Kander and Ebb's collaboration occurred when Kander suggested that they try a ballad. The result, 'My Coloring Book,' became an instant hit." Sandy Stewart performed the song, and it was nominated for a 1962 Grammy Award. Barbra Streisand and Dusty Springfield later covered "My Coloring Book". This song established what was to become Kander and Ebb's iconic musical style, deceptively sophisticated harmonic progression with lyrics and melodies that are accessible to audiences. As Leve writes, "what best defines their voice is the contradictory nature of their collaboration: the composer and lyricist have strikingly different artistic temperaments, the former demonstrably sentimental, the latter campy and cynical."

Kander and Ebb collaborated on an unproduced musical called Golden Gate, which producer-director Harold Prince called "...basically a test to see if the collaboration was any good." They wrote Flora the Red Menace, their first musical to be produced on Broadway, in 1965, in which Liza Minnelli made her Broadway debut. Another early collaboration was the industrial musical General Electric presents Go Fly a Kite written with Walter Marks for General Electric's 5th Electric Executives Conference in Williamsburg, Virginia, in 1966.

Kander's and Ebb's greatest acclaim came from the musical Cabaret (1966) and the 1972 film version. The musical, directed by frequent collaborator Harold Prince, was a major success, with a Broadway run of over 1,100 performances. It won a Tony Award as the season's best musical, and its original cast recording won a Grammy Award. The film, directed by Bob Fosse, won eight Academy Awards. The musical Chicago (1975) after an excellent initial run of 936 performances was revived on Broadway in 1996 to become an even greater hit. It has become the longest-running revival in Broadway history, and the 2002 film version was also a great success, earning an Oscar nomination for the collaboration and winning six others. Other Broadway successes included Woman Of The Year (1981), Kiss of the Spider Woman (1992), and, posthumously for Ebb, Curtains (2006), their final musical.

Minnelli became strongly associated with Kander and Ebb, with Ebb producing Minnelli's Emmy-winning television special Liza with a Z. They appreciated the actress's excellent musicianship and found her congenial to work with. Kander said, "One of the nice things about writing for Liza is that you don't have to write for Liza. She can do anything. You know that whatever you do write, she's going to deliver it exactly the way you intended it. It's really the same with Chita Rivera, the other woman in our lives."

Kander's and Ebb's fascination with the collaborative process began with their work on Cabaret, where a long experimental period permitted actors such as Joel Grey to contribute ideas toward the creation of their characters. The creative team often met at Harold Prince's home to discuss ideas. These sessions are discussed in the Kander and Ebb biography, Colored Lights, as “what if” sessions.

In 1998, Kander and Ebb were recognized for their contributions to theatre and music with Kennedy Center Honors.

In 1994, they were granted honorary doctorate degrees from Niagara University, in Lewiston, New York.

The Scottsboro Boys played on Broadway for a short time in 2010. The book was written by David Thompson and choreographed and directed by Susan Stroman.

Susan Stroman and David Thompson would collaborate again, as director/choreographer and book writer respectively, for Kander & Ebb's musical New York, New York. which uses songs from Scorsese's movie but weaves them into a new story set during the same time period. The show ran April 26 – July 30, 2023.

== Musicals ==
Sources: Internet Broadway Database

- Flora the Red Menace (1965)
- Cabaret (1966)
- Go Fly a Kite (1966), an industrial musical for General Electric
- The Happy Time (1968)
- Zorba (1968)
- 70, Girls, 70 (1971)
- Chicago (1975)
- 2 by 5 (1976)
- The Act (1978)
- Woman of the Year (1981)
- The Rink (1984)
- And the World Goes 'Round (1991)
- Kiss of the Spider Woman (1992)
- Steel Pier (1997)
- Fosse (1999)
- All About Us (1999)
- Curtains (2006)
- The Scottsboro Boys (2010)
- The Visit (2015)
- New York, New York (with additional lyrics by Lin-Manuel Miranda) (2023)

== Films ==
- Cabaret (1972)
- Funny Lady (1975)
- New York, New York (1977) (four original songs, including the famous title song)
- Chicago (2002)
- Kiss of the Spider Woman (2025)

== Television ==
- Mama Malone (1984) (theme song)
- The Thorns (1988) (theme song)
