= Emily Skinner (actress, born 1970) =

American singer

- Born: June 29, 1970 (age 56); Richmond, Virginia, U.S.
- Other name: Emily Scott Skinner
- Education: Carnegie Mellon University (BFA)
- Occupations: Actress; singer
- Years active: 1994–present
- Known for: Side Show; New York, New York; Suffs
- Website: www.emily-skinner.com

Emily Skinner (born June 29, 1970), also known as Emily Scott Skinner, is a Tony-nominated American actress and singer. She has played leading roles in 11 Broadway productions including New York, New York, Prince of Broadway, The Cher Show, Side Show, Jekyll & Hyde, James Joyce's The Dead, The Full Monty, Dinner at Eight, Billy Elliot, as well as the Actor's Fund Broadway concerts of Dreamgirls and The Best Little Whorehouse in Texas. She has sung on concert stages around the world and on numerous recordings.

== Biography ==
Born in Richmond, Virginia, Skinner later attended college at Carnegie Mellon University. She moved to New York in 1992 and originated roles in various workshops, including Frank Wildhorn's Jekyll & Hyde, Stephen Schwartz's show Snapshots, Polly Pen's The Night Governess and the Marvin Hamlisch/Craig Carnelia/Nora Ephron musical Imaginary Friends. She created the role of "Emily" (young Scrooge's love interest) in the 1994 Alan Menken/Lynn Ahrens musical adaptation of A Christmas Carol at the Paramount Theatre at Madison Square Garden.

In 1997, Skinner joined the original Broadway cast of Jekyll & Hyde as an ensemble member and understudy for the leads of Emma and Lucy. During previews, Linda Eder, who played Lucy, developed laryngitis, and Skinner sang some of Lucy's songs from backstage, while Eder acted and sang some songs onstage. Other Broadway credits include Side Show (1997), James Joyce's The Dead (1999; with Christopher Walken), The Full Monty (2001) and Dinner at Eight, where she was nominated for the Outer Critics Circle Award. She appeared in the Encores! concert stagings of the Gershwin musical Pardon My English, A Tree Grows in Brooklyn, Fiorello and No Strings, all at New York City Center. She also performed at the Broadway Actor's Fund benefit concert performances of Dreamgirls in September 2001 and The Best Little Whorehouse in Texas.

Skinner's role as one half of a pair of conjoined twins in Side Show earned her critical acclaim and a Tony Award nomination shared with co-star Alice Ripley. It was the first time in Tony history that two performers were co-nominated as a team for the Best Actress award. Variety noted that "If Ripley and Skinner should win, it would be the first time since 1975 that a pair of actors shared a single Tony. That year John Kani and Winston Ntshona, two South African actors, won a nod for the Athol Fugard double bill Sizwe Banzi Is Dead and The Island." (Other joint nominations for the Tony include Donal Donnelly and Patrick Bedford for Philadelphia, Here I Come! in 1966; the children playing the seven Von Trapp children were nominated for best featured actress in a musical in 1960.)

Skinner has appeared Off-Broadway in numerous productions and workshops at The WPA Theater, Playwrights Horizons, Roundabout Theatre, Manhattan Theater Club, and the York Theatre. She was nominated for a 2017 Drama Desk Award, Outstanding Featured Actress in a Play, for her portrayal of Rosemary in Picnic with The Transport Group.

She has directed and performed in a number of concerts in the "Broadway By the Year" series at the Town Hall in New York City. For example, in June 2003 she appeared in Broadway By the Year 1925; in March 2013 she was in The Broadway Musicals of 1961; and in February 2015, she performed in The Broadway Musicals of 1916–1940.

She sang the roles of Andrea/Archangel Michael at Carnegie Hall in the American premiere of Jerry Springer: The Opera (with Harvey Keitel) in 2008.

Handpicked by Oscar-winning director Stephen Daldry, she was the first American selected to play the role of Billy's dance teacher, Mrs. Wilkinson in Billy Elliot, first in Chicago, starting in March 2010, and before going on to play the same role in the Broadway production in October 2010 until it closed two years later. She reprised her role in The Muny (St. Louis) production in June 2014.

She appeared in Prince of Broadway at the revue's premiere production in Tokyo and Osaka in October 2015 through December 2015. The musical consists of works by the director Hal Prince. She appeared in the Broadway run at the Samuel J. Friedman Theatre which ran from August to October 2017 and was nominated for an Outer Critics Circle Award for her performance.

She appeared in The Cher Show as Georgia Holt, Cher's mother, in the pre-Broadway tryout at the Oriental Theatre in Chicago June 12 – July 15 and in the Broadway run at the Neil Simon Theatre which began previews November 1, 2018, with an opening date of December 3. Skinner remained in the role until the closing performance on August 8, 2019.

Skinner recently starred as Madame Veltri in the Broadway world premiere of New York, New York. The production occupied the St. James Theatre with the first preview on March 24. It officially opened on April 26, 2023. Skinner remained in the role until the closing performance on July 30, 2023, having played 33 previews and 110 regular performances.

Skinner appeared in her eleventh Broadway production in the dual role of Ava Belmont/Febb Burn in Shaina Taub's Suffs.

Recordings and concerts

Skinner and Ripley have collaborated on four recordings: Duets, Unsuspecting Hearts, Raw at Town Hall, and "Unattached". Skinner also recorded a self-titled solo album, which was released in 2001. She has sung with orchestras around the world, including the New York Pops at Carnegie Hall, Jerusalem Symphony Orchestra, Pittsburgh Symphony and the Virginia Symphony. She was the original Ursula in The Little Mermaid demo recordings and workshop, though she was replaced by Sherie Rene Scott for the resulting Broadway production. She is a featured vocalist on the cast albums for A Christmas Carol, Side Show, The Full Monty, and Prince of Broadway.

Skinner debuted her cabaret act, A Broad with a Broad, Broad Mind, in July 2021 at 54 Below and continues to present this program, now entitled Broadway, Her Way, at venues across the world. The program includes songs and anecdotes from her storied career that highlight Skinner's versatility as a singing actress and run the gamut from comedic to heartrending to uplifting.

Regional theatre and tours

At the Kennedy Center she appeared in Merrily We Roll Along and Company during the 2002 Sondheim Celebration, played Agnes Gooch in Mame (2006), starred in their production of Cat on a Hot Tin Roof (2004), and has performed in concert there in the Barbara Cook Spotlight Series twice.

She toured the U.S. in 2004 and 2005 in the Disney revue On the Record.

Elsewhere, she has appeared regionally in leading roles at The Long Wharf Theatre, American Conservatory Theater, Alliance Theatre, Old Globe (in San Diego), Ford's Theatre, St. Louis MUNY, Lyric Theatre of Oklahoma, Bucks County Playhouse, Hangar Theatre, Virginia Repertory Theatre, and numerous others.

Skinner has performed at the Signature Theatre, Arlington, Virginia, in the U.S. premiere of The Witches of Eastwick in 2007, and in the new musical Ace in 2008. She played the title role in Dirty Blonde at the Hangar Theatre, Ithaca, New York, in June 2009, and was in the same play at Signature Theatre later that year. She then went on to play Mrs. Lovett in a well-received production of Sweeney Todd at the Lyric Theatre in Oklahoma in 2009. as well as Ursula in The Little Mermaid.

In November 2012 she originated the starring role of Adelaide, a diva mouse, in The Great American Mousical directed by Julie Andrews based on her book, at the Norma Terris Theatre at Goodspeed Musicals in Chester, Connecticut. She created the role of Monique McCandless in the Stephen King, John Mellencamp, T-Bone Burnett "Southern Gothic" musical Ghost Brothers of Darkland County at both the Alliance Theatre in 2012 and on a national 21-city tour, starting in Bloomington, Indiana in October 2013, which consisted of storytelling, music, and singing.

In 2015, she played the roles of Charlotte in A Little Night Music at the American Conservatory Theater, San Francisco and Sandra in Big Fish at the Lyric Theatre of Oklahoma in July 2015.

In November 2019, Skinner participated in The Sundance Institute's first all-woman developmental lab retreat for what would become Suffs. Her Stepmother was lauded as a scene stealer in the COVID-delayed (originally scheduled for 2019) world premiere of the Broadway-bound Britney Spears musical, Once Upon a One More Time, in December 2021.

She appeared as Matron Mama Morton in The Muny's 2022 production of Chicago and received accolades for her turn as Desiree Armfelt in Barrington Stage Company's A Little Night Music.

In April 2025, Boston's Huntington Theatre announced that Skinner would lead the cast of The Light in the Piazza.

== Work (selected) ==
- 1994–95: A Christmas Carol as Emily, notable for: "A Place Called Home"; Off-Broadway
- 1995: Wantabanaland as Marilyn, Off-Broadway
- 1997: Jekyll & Hyde as u/s Emma, u/s Lucy (performed), Broadway
- 1997–98: Side Show as Daisy Hilton, Broadway (Tony Nomination for Best Actress in a Musical [with Alice Ripley])
- 1999–2000: James Joyce's The Dead as Mary Jane Morkan, Off-Broadway and Broadway transfer
- 2000–02: The Full Monty as Vicki Nichols, World Premiere and Broadway transfer
- 2001: Dreamgirls as one of "The Sweethearts", Broadway concert
- 2002: Company as Jenny, Kennedy Center, Washington, DC
- 2002: Merrily We Roll Along as Gussie, Kennedy Center, Washington, DC
- 2002–03: Dinner at Eight as Kitty Packard, Broadway revival
- 2003: My Life with Albertine, Playwrights Horizons
- 2004: Cat on a Hot Tin Roof, Kennedy Center
- 2004: Breakfast at Tiffany's (New Production) as Mag, The Muny, St. Louis, World Premiere
- 2004: On the Record, World Premiere / National Tour
- 2006: The Best Little Whorehouse in Texas as Mona Stangley, Broadway concert
- 2007: The Witches of Eastwick as Alexandra, Signature Theatre, Arlington, Virginia, United States Premiere
- 2008: Ace, Signature Theatre
- 2009: Dirty Blonde at Hangar Theatre, Signature Theater
- 2009: Sweeney Todd, Lyric Theatre of Oklahoma
- 2010: Billy Elliot as Mrs. Wilkinson (Replacement), Oriental Theatre Chicago, Illinois and Broadway
- 2010: Ten Stories Tall (film) as Claire
- 2012: Ghost Brothers of Darkland County as Monique, Alliance Theater, Atlanta, Georgia
- 2012: The Great American Mousical, Goodspeed Theatre
- 2013: Fiorello!, City Center Encores
- 2013: Ghost Brothers of Darkland County, National Tour
- 2014: Inventing Mary Martin, York Theatre
- 2014: Billy Elliot, The MUNY St Louis
- 2014: The Little Mermaid, Lyric Theatre of Oklahoma
- 2014: A Little Night Music, Lyric Theatre of Oklahoma
- 2014: Do I Hear a Waltz?, 42nd Street Moon Theatre
- 2014: Mame as Mame, Virginia Repertory Theatre, Richmond, Virginia
- 2015: A Little Night Music as Countess Charlotte Malcolm, American Conservatory Theater, San Francisco, California
- 2015: Prince of Broadway, International Tour, World Premiere Production
- 2016: 42nd Street, The MUNY
- 2016: Follies as Phyllis, Repertory Theatre of St. Louis, St. Louis, Missouri
- 2016: Into the Woods as The Witch, Theatre Under The Stars (Houston)
- 2017: Picnic as Rosemary, The Transport Group, Off-Broadway
- 2017: The Little Mermaid as Ursula, The Muny, St. Louis, Revival Adaptation
- 2017: Prince of Broadway, Samuel J. Friedman Theatre, Broadway
- 2017: Man of La Mancha, Off Broadway, Transport Group Concert Production
- 2018–19: The Cher Show as Georgia Holt, Oriental Theatre, Chicago and Broadway transfer
- 2021: Chicago, St Louis MUNY
- 2021: Once Upon a One More Time as Stepmother, Shakespeare Theatre Company, World Premiere (initially scheduled to premiere October 2019 in Chicago)
- 2022: Chicago as Matron Mama Morton, The Muny, St. Louis
- 2022: A Little Night Music as Desiree Armfeldt, Barrington Stage Company, Pittsfield, Massachusetts
- 2023: New York, New York as Madame Veltri, Broadway
- 2024: Suffs as Alva Belmont/Febb Burn, Broadway
- 2025: Schmigadoon! as Mildred Layton, Kennedy Center
