= Steel Pier (musical) =

- Original Broadway Cast album
- Music: John Kander
- Lyrics: Fred Ebb
- Book: David Thompson
- Productions: 1997 Broadway; 1998 U.S. Tour; 2011 London; 2012 Union Theatre

Steel Pier is a musical written by the songwriting team of Kander and Ebb with an original book by David Thompson.

== Productions ==
Directed by Scott Ellis with choreography by Susan Stroman, the musical opened on Broadway at the Richard Rodgers Theatre on April 24, 1997, and closed on June 28, 1997, running for 76 performances (and 33 previews). It starred Karen Ziemba as Rita Racine, Daniel McDonald as Bill Kelly, Gregory Harrison as Mick Hamilton, Debra Monk as Shelby Stevens, and Kristin Chenoweth, making her Broadway debut, as Precious. David Loud was the music director and created the vocal arrangements.

The show opened to mixed reviews, most praising the performances and score. Ben Brantley, in his review for The New York Times, concluded "Yet despite the flashes of grace and inventiveness in Ms. Stroman's choreography and the modest melodic appeal of the work's songs, Steel Pier is insulated by a fuzzy cover of blandness. For Mr. Kander and Mr. Ebb, devils obviously make better company than angels." The musical was nominated for Best Musical, Best Score and Best Book at the Tony Awards, but it ultimately lost all of these to Titanic.

In the same article that announced the show was closing, it also announced producer Roger Berlind's plan to "mount a national tour during the 1998-99 season." The U.S. Tour opened in 1998, directed and choreographed by Tee Scatuorchio and starring Heidi Blickenstaff in Monk's role as Shelby. The production has become lost to time with little information on the tour online, besides a playbill from their stop at Ball State University on September 25, 2000.

A new amateur production ran at the Bridewell Theatre, London, in February 2011.

The UK premiere ran at the Union Theater, London, from October 31 to November 24, 2012. This rendition was directed by Paul Taylor-Mills with choreography by Richard Jones and musical direction by Angharad Sanders.

== Plot summary ==
Act I

Stunt pilot Bill Kelly lies face down on the 1933 Atlantic City shore, his flight jacket torn. He manages to stand up, looking at a raffle ticket he holds in his hand and then to the sky, and exclaims, "Alright! I understand! I've got three weeks! Three weeks!" before hurrying off.

Aging celebrity Rita Racine, once famously known as 'Lindy's Lovebird' for being the first woman to kiss Lindbergh when he arrived home from France, comes on the stage and waits for her partner so she can enter the dance marathon on the Steel Pier. Bill appears and watches her for a moment, but as soon as she drops her suitcase, he hurries down to help her pick up her things and seizes the moment to talk with her. He asks if she has a partner yet and reluctantly walks away when she says she does. Alone, Rita rejoices the fact that this will be her last marathon and she will finally be able to return home ("Willing to Ride"). After her song, Rita sees that the rest of the contestants are making their way into the ballroom and follows them inside with hopes of finding her partner there.

Inside, emcee Mick Hamilton gets the marathon underway ("Everybody Dance"). The rules: contestants must dance for forty-five minutes every hour, followed by a fifteen-minute break; if they fall, collapse, or for any reason stop dancing, they will be disqualified. Realizing at the last minute that her partner is a no-show, Rita is forced to accept Bill's offer and quickly discovers he has two left feet. He tells Rita about his daredevil stunts at the Trenton Air Show where he crashed his plane but bought the winning raffle ticket for a kiss and a dance from 'Lindy's Lovebird'. In song, he tells her how this is his "Second Chance".

During the first fifteen-minute break, other partners introduce themselves: Shelby Stevens, a former cook in a lumber camp who knows how to get around, and harmonica virtuoso Luke Adams; struggling young newlyweds from Utah, Precious and Happy McGuire; Olympic wrestler Johnny Adel and one-time socialite Dora Foster; and vaudeville brother-and-sister team Bette and Buddy Becker. While the contestants meet one another, Rita sneaks off to Mick, where it is revealed that he and she are secretly married. Their scheme: Mick makes sure she wins, they take the prize money, and move on to the next town. Mick promises her that this marathon will be the last, but as she leaves to get ready for the next hour, he confides in his sidekick, Mr. Walker, that this, too, is a trick and there are many more marathons ahead ("A Powerful Thing").

As time passes, the contestants begin dropping off from exhaustion. Mick tries to bring publicity to the marathon, first showcasing Rita's fame ("Dance With Me/The Last Girl"), then Shelby's vocal talents ("Everybody's Girl"), and finally decides to publicize the romance between Bill and Rita and plans a pretend dance floor wedding, insisting that Rita tell Bill in spite of her misgivings. After the "Two Step", Rita goes to tell Bill the plan and finds him on the boardwalk. After joking about Bill's inability to swim ("Wet"), Rita kisses Bill and quickly retreats, realizing that she's falling for him.

Remembering that she didn't get the chance to tell Bill of Mick's plan, Rita gets frightened as Mick brings Bill on stage to make the announcement himself on the nightly radio broadcast, but Bill proposes anyway, unprompted by either. In celebration, Mick has Rita sing her signature tune ("Lovebird") as the scene flashes back to her act at the Trenton Air Show where Bill first saw her. The scene shifts back to the Steel Pier where, in order to knock out some of the competition, Mick announces that it's time to run "The Sprints". Rita falls, but Bill somehow manages to stop and rewind time so that she won't be disqualified before his 'time is up'. On her second chance, she doesn't fall and the marathon continues.

Act II

As the publicity stunt wedding approaches, Rita is drawn even closer to Bill. During a fifteen-minute nap, she dreams of him taking her on an unworldly airplane ride ("Leave the World Behind"). Once she wakes, it is discovered that Happy has dropped out of the contest, tired of the marathon lifestyle and hoping to go back to Utah with Precious. Precious, however, has other grander plans for herself and switches partners to remain in the contest in hopes that she will have a chance for some limelight. Shelby, although much older than Happy, realizes that she's fallen in love with him and offers to go home with him in Precious' place ("Somebody Older"), but he declines, knowing that it would never work.

On the night of the phoney wedding night, Mick takes Rita up to the roof to show her the lines of people flocking to buy tickets. Suspecting her growing feeling for Bill, Mick insists that she get him to drop out as soon as the wedding's over, and leaves. As Rita consoles herself that this marathon-business will all be over shortly, Precious comes looking for Mick and confesses to Rita that she had had an affair with him in hopes of having some showcase time in the marathon. Rita's world is quickly falling apart ("Running in Place").

At the circus-like, cellophane-themed wedding, Mick features Precious in the ceremony as the personification of Fralinger's salt water taffy in return for her personal favors ("Two Little Words"). For the titillation of the crowd, Rita and Bill are given their fifteen-minute break in a honeymoon tent on the dance floor, one Rita knows can be ripped away at any moment. When she wishes that she and Bill could just escape, Bill offers to take her away in his plane, telling her that anything can happen if you believe in your dreams ("First You Dream"). But as he explains to Rita that his three weeks are finally up, the tent is ripped away and the hurt and confused Rita runs from the dance floor, leaving an even more hurt Bill.

Mick tries to force Rita back on to the dance floor to finish the marathon with another partner, but she is determined to go home. Mick informs her that he sold the house a long time ago. As she packs to leave, Mick furiously reminds her of everything he has done for her ("Steel Pier"). He grabs the Air Show raffle ticket Bill had given her out of her hand and wonders why she would still be thinking about how her act at Trenton had failed after some 'hot-dog pilot' got himself killed in a crash. Suddenly everything comes clear to Rita as she realizes that she had been dancing and falling in love with a man who was only with her on three weeks of borrowed time. As she realizes what a loveless trap her life with Mick has been, the world around her fades away and Bill appears ("Steel Pier (reprise)"). He says he's just a guy who wanted a second chance, but he could no longer stay - he only had three weeks, but she has a lifetime. He asks her at last for the dance he won in the raffle, and once the transient moment ends, he urges to take a chance on life ("Final Dance"). Exhausted, Rita picks up her suitcase and, with a triumphant sense of hope and determination, leaves the marathon behind forever.

== Song list ==
Some critics identified "Everybody Dance", "Lovebird", and "Steel Pier" among the outstanding musical numbers.

Act I

- "Prelude" – Orchestra
- "Willing to Ride" – Rita Racine
- "Everybody Dance" – Mick Hamilton, Mick's Picks and Company
- "Second Chance" – Bill Kelly
- "Montage I" – Company
- "A Powerful Thing" – Mr. Walker and Mick Hamilton
- "Dance With Me" / "The Last Girl" – Mick Hamilton, Mick's Picks, Bill Kelly and Company
- "Montage II" – Company
- "Everybody's Girl" – Shelby Stevens
- "Wet" – Rita Racine and Bill Kelly
- "Lovebird" – Rita Racine
- "The Sprints" – Mick Hamilton and Company

Act II

- "Entr'acte" – Orchestra
- "Leave the World Behind" – Bill Kelly, Rita Racine and Company
- "Montage III" – Company
- "Somebody Older" – Shelby Stevens
- "Running in Place" – Rita Racine
- "Two Little Words" – Precious McGuire, Mick's Picks and Company
- "First You Dream" – Bill Kelly and Rita Racine
- "Steel Pier" – Mick Hamilton, Rita Racine and Mick's Picks
- "Steel Pier" (Reprise) – Company
- "Final Dance" – Bill Kelly and Rita Racine

== Principal roles and original casts ==
Character	Original Broadway Cast	US Tour Cast*	Original London Cast
Rita Racine	Karen Ziemba	Connie SaLoutos	Sarah Galbraith
Bill Kelly	Daniel McDonald	David Engelman	Jay Rincon
Mick Hamilton	Gregory Harrison	Todd Alan Johnson	Ian Knauer
Mr. Walker	Ronn Carroll	Tim Bennett	Ian Kirton
Shelby Stevens	Debra Monk	Heidi Blickenstaff	Aimie Atkinson
Precious McGuire	Kristin Chenoweth	Amy Goldberger	Lisa-Anne Wood
Happy McGuire	Jim Newman	Timothy Ford	Rob Lines
Johnny Adel	Timothy Warmen	Neal Richard Lee	Brett Shiels
Buddy Becker	Joel Blum	Joel Newsome	Samuel Parker
Bette Becker	Valerie Wright	Michelle Aravena	Clare Louise Connolly
Dora Foster	Alison Bevan	Becca Ayers	Amy Anzel
Luke Adams	John C. Havens	Hayes Bergman	Ben Beard

*These credits are sourced from the playbill for the tour's stop in Muncie, Indiana in September 2000 and the North Carolina Theatre credits listed on About the Artists. Due to this, the credits might not fully match the cast at the start of the tour in 1998.

== Recording ==
The Original Broadway cast recording was released by RCA Victor Broadway on July 29, 1997.

== Awards and nominations ==
=== Original Broadway production ===
Year	Award	Category	Nominee	Result
1997	Tony Award	Best Musical		Nominated
1997	Tony Award	Best Book of a Musical	David Thompson	Nominated
1997	Tony Award	Best Original Score	John Kander and Fred Ebb	Nominated
1997	Tony Award	Best Performance by a Leading Actor in a Musical	Daniel McDonald	Nominated
1997	Tony Award	Best Performance by a Leading Actress in a Musical	Karen Ziemba	Nominated
1997	Tony Award	Best Performance by a Featured Actor in a Musical	Joel Blum	Nominated
1997	Tony Award	Best Performance by a Featured Actress in a Musical	Debra Monk	Nominated
1997	Tony Award	Best Direction of a Musical	Scott Ellis	Nominated
1997	Tony Award	Best Choreography	Susan Stroman	Nominated
1997	Tony Award	Best Orchestrations	Michael Gibson	Nominated
1997	Tony Award	Best Scenic Design	Tony Walton	Nominated
1997	Drama Desk Award	Outstanding Musical		Nominated
1997	Drama Desk Award	Outstanding Actor in a Musical	Daniel McDonald	Nominated
1997	Drama Desk Award	Outstanding Actress in a Musical	Karen Ziemba	Nominated
1997	Drama Desk Award	Outstanding Featured Actress in a Musical	Debra Monk	Nominated
1997	Drama Desk Award	Outstanding Director of a Musical	Scott Ellis	Nominated
1997	Drama Desk Award	Outstanding Choreography	Susan Stroman	Nominated
1997	Drama Desk Award	Outstanding Music	John Kander	Nominated
1997	Drama Desk Award	Outstanding Orchestrations	Michael Gibson	Nominated
1997	Drama Desk Award	Outstanding Set Design	Tony Walton	Nominated
1997	Outer Critics Circle Award	Outstanding New Broadway Musical		Nominated
1997	Outer Critics Circle Award	Outstanding Direction of a Musical	Scott Ellis	Nominated
1997	Outer Critics Circle Award	Outstanding Actor in a Musical	Gregory Harrison	Nominated
1997	Outer Critics Circle Award	Outstanding Actress in a Musical	Karen Ziemba	Nominated
1997	Outer Critics Circle Award	Outstanding Featured Actress in a Musical	Debra Monk	Nominated
1997	Outer Critics Circle Award	Outstanding Choreography	Susan Stroman	Nominated
1997	Outer Critics Circle Award	Outstanding Scenic Design	Tony Walton	Nominated
1997	Outer Critics Circle Award	Outstanding Costume Design	Peter Kaczorowski	Nominated
1997	Outer Critics Circle Award	Outstanding Lighting Design	Peter Kaczorowski	Won

Steel Pier was nominated for eleven Tony Awards but won none. This tied Chicago, also written by Kander and Ebb, for most Tony nominations without a win. Another Kander-Ebb musical, The Scottsboro Boys, was nominated for twelve Tony Awards but won none, besting Steel Pier and Chicago by one.

Kristin Chenoweth won a Theatre World Award (which honors notable New York theatre debuts) for her performance.
