= Harold Prince =

American theatre producer and director (1928–2019)

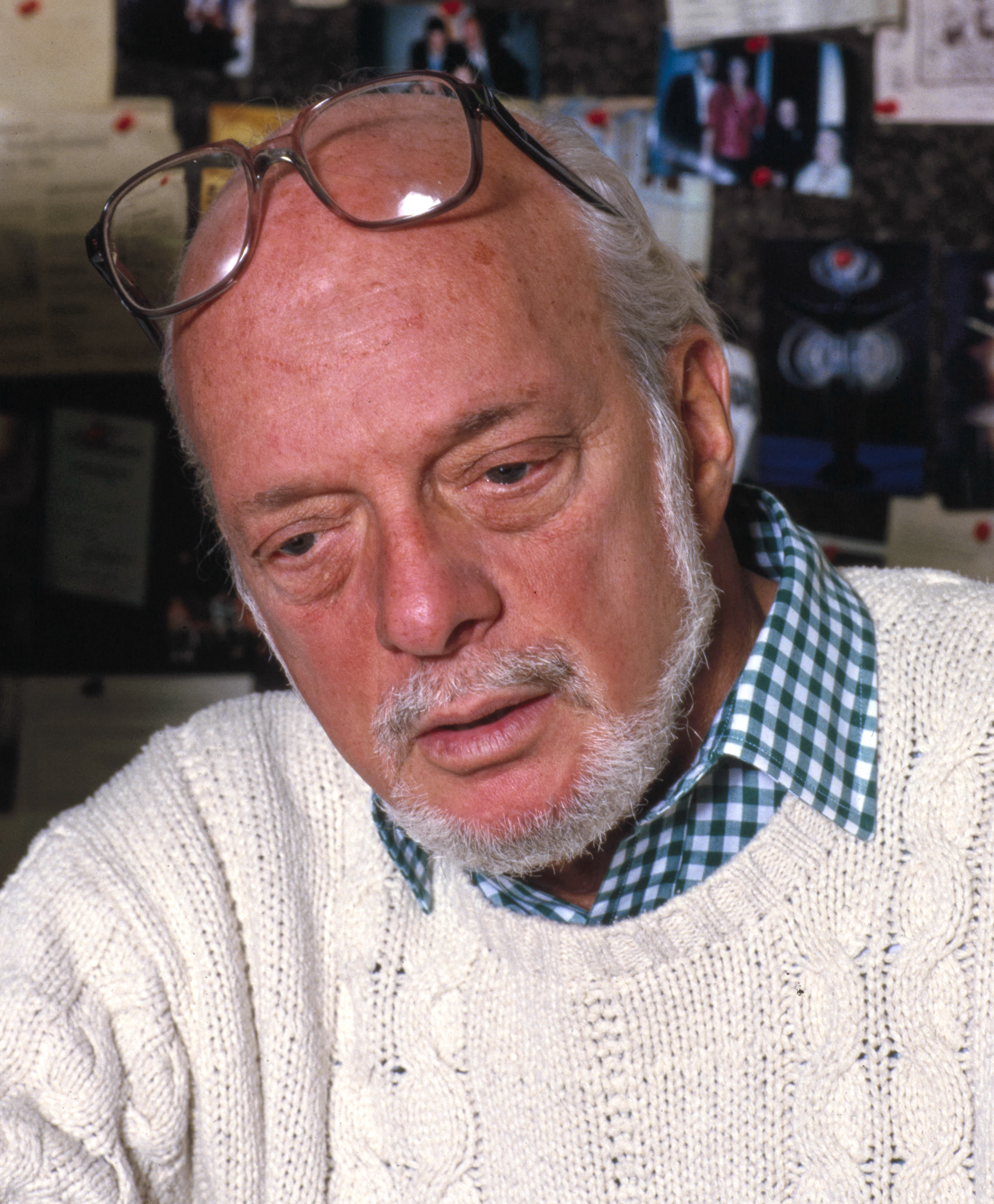
- Prince in 1988
- Born: Harold Smith; January 30, 1928; New York City, U.S.
- Died: July 31, 2019 (aged 91); Reykjavík, Iceland
- Other names: Hal Prince; Harold Smith Prince
- Education: Timothy Dwight School
- Alma mater: University of Pennsylvania
- Occupations: Theatre director; producer
- Years active: 1955–2019
- Spouse: Judith Chaplin (m. 1962)
- Children: 2

Harold Smith Prince (born Harold Smith; January 30, 1928 – July 31, 2019), commonly known as Hal Prince, was an American theater director and producer known for his work in musical theater.

One of the foremost figures in 20th-century American theater, Prince became associated throughout his career with many of the most noteworthy musicals in Broadway history, including West Side Story, Fiddler on the Roof, Cabaret, Sweeney Todd, and Phantom of the Opera, the longest-running show in Broadway history. Many of his productions broke new ground for musical theater, expanding the possibilities of the form by incorporating more serious and political subjects, such as Nazism (Cabaret), the difficulties of marriage (Company), and the forcible opening of 19th-century Japan (Pacific Overtures).

Over the span of his career, he won a record 21 Tony Awards, including eight for Direction, eight for producing the year's Best Musical, two as Best Producer of a Musical, and three Special Awards.

== Early life and education ==
Prince was born to an affluent family in Manhattan, the son of Blanche (née Stern) and Harold Smith. His family was of German Jewish descent. He was adopted by his stepfather, Milton A. Prince, a stockbroker. Following his graduation from the Franklin School, later called the Dwight School, in New York, he entered the University of Pennsylvania, where he followed a liberal arts curriculum and graduated in three years at age 19. He later served two years with the United States Army in post–World War II Germany.

== Career ==
Prince began work in the theatre as an assistant stage manager to theatrical producer and director George Abbott. Along with Abbott, he co-produced The Pajama Game, which won the 1955 Tony Award for Best Musical. He received Tony Awards for 1956's Damn Yankees, 1960's Fiorello! and 1963's A Funny Thing Happened on the Way to the Forum, and Tony nominations for 1958's West Side Story and New Girl in Town. He went on to direct and produce his own productions in 1962 beginning with the unsuccessful A Family Affair followed by his first critically successful musical, She Loves Me (Tony nomination, 1964).

He received a Tony Award for producing Fiddler on the Roof (1965) and almost gave up musical theatre before his Tony winning success directing and producing with Kander and Ebb's Cabaret in 1966, followed by Kander and Ebb's Zorba (Tony nomination, 1969). 1970 marked the start of his greatest creative collaboration, with composer/lyricist Stephen Sondheim. They had previously worked on West Side Story and their association spawned a long string of landmark productions, including Company (Tony Award, 1970), Follies (Tony Award, 1971), A Little Night Music (Tony Award, 1973), Pacific Overtures (Tony nomination, 1976), Side by Side by Sondheim (Tony nomination, 1977), and Sweeney Todd (Tony Award, 1979). Following Merrily We Roll Along (1981), which ran for 16 performances, they parted ways until Bounce in 2003.

He received a Tony nomination for directing On the Twentieth Century (1978) and won twice for the Andrew Lloyd Webber musicals Evita (1980) and The Phantom of the Opera (1988). Between them, Prince was offered the job of directing Cats by Lloyd Webber but turned it down and directed A Doll's Life (1982) with lyricists Betty Comden and Adolph Green. The musical continued the story of Nora Helmer past what Henrik Ibsen had written in A Doll's House. It ran for five performances; The New York Times wrote, "It was overproduced and overpopulated to the extent that the tiny resolute figure of Nora became lost in the combined mechanics of Broadway and the Industrial Revolution." Broadway wags dubbed the show either "A Doll's Death" or, due to the omnipresent portal out of which Nora slammed in the prologue, "A Door's Life."

Prince's other commercially unsuccessful musicals included Grind (Tony nomination, 1985), which closed after 71 performances, and Roza (1987). However, his production of The Phantom of the Opera eventually became the longest-running show in Broadway history. Prince ultimately stopped producing because he "became more interested in directing". Kiss of the Spider Woman, which he directed in 1993, received the Tony Award for Best Musical. In 1994, Prince became a Kennedy Center Honoree. He received a 1995 Tony Award for directing Showboat, and was nominated again for 1999's Parade.

In 2000, he was awarded the National Medal of Arts. In 2006, Prince was awarded a Special Tony Award for Lifetime Achievement in the Theatre. In 2007, he directed his last original musical on Broadway, LoveMusik, and on May 20 of that year, he gave the commencement address at Gettysburg College in Gettysburg, Pennsylvania. In 2008 Prince was the keynote speaker at Elon University's Convocation for Honors celebration.

Prince co-directed, with Susan Stroman, the 2010 musical Paradise Found. The musical features the music of Johann Strauss II as adapted by Jonathan Tunick with lyrics by Ellen Fitzhugh. The book was written by Richard Nelson, based on Joseph Roth's novel The Tale of the 1002nd Night. The musical premiered at the Menier Chocolate Factory in London on May 19, 2010 and closed on June 26, and starred Mandy Patinkin.

A retrospective of Prince's work titled Prince of Broadway was co-directed by Prince and Susan Stroman and presented by Umeda Arts Theater in Tokyo, Japan in October 2015. The book was written by David Thompson with additional material and orchestrations by Jason Robert Brown. Prince was slated to direct The Band's Visit in 2016 but withdrew due to scheduling conflicts. Prince of Broadway opened in August 2017 at the Samuel J. Friedman Theatre in New York with a cast featuring Chuck Cooper, Janet Dacal, Bryonha Marie Parham, Emily Skinner, Brandon Uranowitz, Kaley Ann Voorhees, Michael Xavier, Tony Yazbeck, and Karen Ziemba.

In 2018, Prince announced plans to adapt Alexandra Shiva's 2015 documentary How to Dance in Ohio into a musical along with composers Jacob Yandura and Rebekah Greer Melocik and playwright Bess Wohl. After Prince died in 2019, Sammi Cannold took over as the show's director. The musical premiered at Syracuse Stage on September 21, 2022 and ran until October 9, 2022 and made its Broadway debut in late 2023.

In addition to musicals, Prince also directed operas including Josef Tal's Ashmedai, Carlisle Floyd's Willie Stark, Gounod's Faust at the Metropolitan Opera in 1990, Puccini's Madama Butterfly, and a revival of Bernstein's Candide (Tony Award, 1974). In 1983 Prince staged Turandot for the Vienna State Opera (conductor: Lorin Maazel; with José Carreras and Éva Marton).

=== Legacy ===
Prince was the inspiration for John Lithgow's character in Bob Fosse's film All That Jazz. He was also assumed to be the basis of a character in Richard Bissell's novel Say, Darling, which chronicled Bissell's own experience turning his novel 7½ Cents into The Pajama Game.

According to Masterworks Broadway, "besides his achievements as a producer and director, Prince is also known for bringing innovation to the theatrical arts. In collaboration with Stephen Sondheim, he was a pioneer in the development of the 'concept musical,' taking its departure from an idea or theme rather than from a traditional story. Their first project of this kind, Company (1970), was a solid success and paved the way for other innovative musicals."

According to The New York Times, "He was known, too, for his collaborations with a murderer's row of creative talents, among them the choreographers Bob Fosse, Jerome Robbins, Michael Bennett and Susan Stroman; the designers Boris Aronson, Eugene Lee, Patricia Zipprodt and Florence Klotz; and the composers Leonard Bernstein, John Kander, Stephen Sondheim and Andrew Lloyd Webber."

The Harold Prince Theatre at the Annenberg Center of the University of Pennsylvania is named in his honor.

A documentary titled Harold Prince: The Director's Life was directed by Lonny Price and broadcast on PBS in Great Performances in November 2018.

In 2019, The New York Public Library for the Performing Arts presented an extensive exhibit honoring the life and work of Harold Prince. Prince served as a trustee for the library and on the National Council of the Arts of the National Endowment for the Arts. At the behest of Lotte Lenya, whom he cast in Cabaret (1966), Prince also served on the Board of Trustees of The Kurt Weill Foundation for Music and as a judge of their Lotte Lenya Competition.

Andrew Lloyd Webber said: "There isn't anybody working on musical theater on either side of the Atlantic who doesn't owe an enormous debt to this extraordinary man....Hal was very minimalist with his sets. People think of Phantom as this great big spectacle. That's an illusion. Hal always looked at the show as this big black box in which the stage craft enabled you to believe there was this impressive scenery all around you."

Jason Robert Brown said: "More than anything else, when I think about Hal, I think about his belief in theater. He believed in what it could do....He thought a lot about the world and the political systems and emotional support systems in it. He was very much a political artist."

== Personal life ==
Prince married Judy Chaplin, daughter of composer and musical director Saul Chaplin, on October 26, 1962. They are parents of Daisy Prince, a director, and Charles Prince, a conductor. Actor Alexander Chaplin, best known for his role as James Hobert on Spin City, is Prince's son-in-law. At the time of his death, Prince lived in Manhattan and Switzerland.

=== Death ===
Prince died in Reykjavík, Iceland, on July 31, 2019, at the age of 91, after falling ill while traveling from Switzerland to the United States. Later that day, the marquee lights of Broadway's theaters were dimmed in a traditional gesture of honor. A memorial was held at Broadway's Majestic Theatre on December 16, 2019.

== Work ==
=== Stage productions ===
Source: Playbill (vault); Internet Broadway Database

- Tickets, Please! (1950) – assistant stage manager
- Call Me Madam (1950) – assistant stage manager
- Wonderful Town (1953) – stage manager
- The Pajama Game (1954) – co-producer
- Damn Yankees (1955) – co-producer
- New Girl in Town (1957) – co-producer
- West Side Story (1957) – co-producer
- Fiorello! (1959) – co-producer
- West Side Story (1960) – co-producer
- Tenderloin (1960) – co-producer
- They Might Be Giants (1961) – co-producer
- A Call on Kuprin (1961) – producer
- Take Her, She's Mine (1961) – producer
- A Family Affair (1962) – director
- A Funny Thing Happened on the Way to the Forum (1962) – producer
- She Loves Me (1963) – producer, director
- Fiddler on the Roof (1964) – producer
- Baker Street (1964) – director
- Flora the Red Menace (1965) – producer
- It's a Bird... It's a Plane... It's Superman (1966) – producer, director
- Cabaret (1966) – producer, director
- Zorba (1968) – producer, director
- Company (1970) – producer, director
- Follies (1971) – producer, director
- The Great God Brown (1972) – artistic director
- Don Juan (1972) – artistic director
- A Little Night Music (1973) – director, producer
- Sondheim: A Musical Tribute (1973) – performer
- The Visit (1973) – director
- Chemin de Fer (1973) – artistic director
- Holiday (1973) – artistic director
- Candide (1974) – producer, director
- Love for Love (1974) – director
- The Member of the Wedding (1975) – artistic director
- The Rules of the Game (1974) – artistic director
- Pacific Overtures (1976) – producer, director
- Side by Side by Sondheim (1977) – producer
- Some of My Best Friends (1977) – director
- On the Twentieth Century (1978) – director
- Sweeney Todd (1979) – director
- Evita (1979) – director
- Merrily We Roll Along (1981) – director
- Willie Stark (1981) – director
- A Doll's Life (1982) – producer, director
- Play Memory (1984) – director
- Diamonds (1984) – director
- Grind (1985) – producer, director
- The Phantom of the Opera (1986) – director
- Roza (1987) – director
- Cabaret (1987) – director
- Grandchild Of Kings (1992) (Off-Broadway) – adaptation (from the stories of Seán O'Casey) director and adapter
- Kiss of the Spider Woman (1993) – director
- Show Boat (1994) – director
- The Petrified Prince (1994) Off-Broadway – director
- Whistle Down the Wind (1996) Washington, DC
- Candide (1997) – director
- Parade (1998) – director, co-conceiver
- 3hree (2000) – supervisor, director (The Flight of the Lawnchair Man)
- Hollywood Arms (2002) – producer, director
- Bounce (2003) – director
- LoveMusik (2007) – director
- Paradise Found (2010) – director
- Prince of Broadway (2015) – director

=== Filmography ===
- Something for Everyone (1970) – director
- A Little Night Music (1977) – director

== Awards and nominations ==
Sources: Playbill (vault); Internet Broadway Database; Los Angeles Times

Year	Award	Category	Work	Result
1955	Tony Award	Best Musical	The Pajama Game	Won
1956	Tony Award	Best Musical	Damn Yankees	Won
1958	Tony Award	Best Musical	West Side Story	Nominated
1958	Tony Award	Best Musical	New Girl in Town	Nominated
1960	Tony Award	Best Musical	Fiorello!	Won
1963	Tony Award	Best Musical	A Funny Thing Happened on the Way to the Forum	Won
1963	Tony Award	Best Producer of a Musical	A Funny Thing Happened on the Way to the Forum	Won
1964	Tony Award	Best Musical	She Loves Me	Nominated
1964	Tony Award	Best Direction of a Musical	She Loves Me	Nominated
1964	Tony Award	Best Producer of a Musical	She Loves Me	Nominated
1965	Tony Award	Best Musical	Fiddler on the Roof	Won
1965	Tony Award	Best Producer of a Musical	Fiddler on the Roof	Won
1967	Tony Award	Best Musical	Cabaret	Won
1967	Tony Award	Best Direction of a Musical	Cabaret	Won
1969	Tony Award	Best Musical	Zorba	Nominated
1969	Tony Award	Best Direction of a Musical	Zorba	Nominated
1970	Drama Desk Award	Outstanding Director of a Musical	Company	Won
1971	Tony Award	Best Musical	Company	Won
1971	Tony Award	Best Direction of a Musical	Company	Won
1971	Drama Desk Award	Outstanding Director	Follies	Won
1972	Tony Award	Best Musical	Follies	Nominated
1972	Tony Award	Best Direction of a Musical	Follies	Won
1972	Tony Award	Special Tony Award	Fiddler on the Roof	Won
1973	Tony Award	Best Musical	A Little Night Music	Won
1973	Tony Award	Best Direction of a Musical	A Little Night Music	Nominated
1973	Drama Desk Award	Outstanding Director	A Little Night Music	Won
1973	Drama Desk Award	Outstanding Director	The Great God Brown	Won
1974	Tony Award	Best Direction of a Musical	Candide	Won
1974	Tony Award	Special Tony Award	Candide	Won
1974	Drama Desk Award	Outstanding Director	Candide	Won
1974	Drama Desk Award	Outstanding Director	The Visit	Won
1976	Tony Award	Best Musical	Pacific Overtures	Nominated
1976	Tony Award	Best Direction of a Musical	Pacific Overtures	Nominated
1976	Drama Desk Award	Outstanding Director of a Musical	Pacific Overtures	Nominated
1977	Tony Award	Best Musical	Side by Side by Sondheim	Nominated
1978	Tony Award	Best Direction of a Musical	On the Twentieth Century	Nominated
1979	Tony Award	Best Direction of a Musical	Sweeney Todd	Won
1979	Drama Desk Award	Outstanding Director of a Musical	Sweeney Todd	Won
1980	Tony Award	Best Direction of a Musical	Evita	Won
1980	Drama Desk Award	Outstanding Director of a Musical	Evita	Won
1985	Tony Award	Best Musical	Grind	Nominated
1985	Tony Award	Best Direction of a Musical	Grind	Nominated
1988	Tony Award	Best Direction of a Musical	The Phantom of the Opera	Won
1988	Drama Desk Award	Outstanding Director of a Musical	The Phantom of the Opera	Won
1988	Drama Desk Award	Outstanding Director of a Musical	Cabaret	Nominated
1992	Outer Critics Circle Award	Outstanding Director	Grandchild of Kings	Nominated
1993	Tony Award	Best Direction of a Musical	Kiss of the Spider Woman	Nominated
1995	Tony Award	Best Direction of a Musical	Show Boat	Won
1995	Drama Desk Award	Outstanding Director of a Musical	Show Boat	Won
1995	Outer Critics Circle Award	Outstanding Director of a Musical	Show Boat	Won
1999	Tony Award	Best Direction of a Musical	Parade	Nominated
1999	Drama Desk Award	Outstanding Director of a Musical	Parade	Nominated
2006	Tony Award	Lifetime Achievement Award	—N/a	Won
2007	Drama Desk Award	Outstanding Director of a Musical	LoveMusik	Nominated

== Bibliography ==
- Prince, Harold, Contradictions: Notes on Twenty-six Years in the Theatre, Dodd, Mead ISBN 0-396-07019-1 (1974 autobiography)
- Prince, Harold (1993), Grandchild of Kings, Samuel French
- Hirsch, Foster (1989, rev 2005), Harold Prince and the American Musical Theatre, Applause Books, (with Prince providing extensive interviews and the foreword), ISBN 1-5578-3617-5
- Ilson, Carol (1989), Harold Prince: From Pajama Game To Phantom of the Opera And Beyond, Cambridge University Press, ISBN 0-8357-1961-8
- Ilson, Carol (2000), Harold Prince: A Director's Journey, Limelight Series, Hal Leonard Corporation ISBN 0-8791-0296-9
- Napoleon, Davi, Chelsea on the Edge: The Adventures of an American Theater, Iowa State University Press (Includes a preface by Prince and a full chapter about the production of Candide)
- Brunet, Daniel; Angel Esquivel Rios, Miguel; and Geraths, Armin (2006), Creating the "New Musical": Harold Prince in Berlin, Peter Lang Publishing
- Thelen, Lawrence (1999), The Show Makers: Great Directors of the American Musical Theatre, Routledge
- Guernsey, Otis L. (Editor) (1985), Broadway Song and Story: Playwrights/Lyricists/Composers Discuss Their Hits, Dodd Mead

== See also ==
- List of English speaking theatre directors in the 20th and 21st centuries
- List of Tony Award records
