= Fred Ebb =

American lyricist (1928–2004)

Background information
- Born: April 8, 1928; New York City, U.S.
- Died: September 11, 2004 (aged 76) New York City, U.S.
- Genres: Musical theatre, film, television
- Occupations: Lyricist, playwright
- Years active: 1956–2004
- Formerly of: Kander and Ebb

Fred Ebb (April 8, 1928 – September 11, 2004) was an American lyricist and playwright who had many successful collaborations with composer John Kander. The Kander and Ebb team frequently wrote for such performers as Liza Minnelli and Chita Rivera.

== Background ==
He worked during the early 1950s bronzing baby shoes, as a trucker's assistant, and was also employed in a department store credit office and at a hosiery company. He graduated from New York University with a bachelor's degree in English Literature, and also earned his master's degree in English from Columbia University.

One of his early collaborators was Philip Springer, and a song they wrote together ("I Never Loved Him Anyhow") was recorded by Carmen McRae in 1956. Another song Ebb wrote with Springer was "Heartbroken" (1953), which was recorded by Judy Garland. Other Springer-Ebb tunes include "Nevertheless I Never Lost the Blues". "Don't Forget", which he wrote with Norman Leyden, was recorded by singer Eddy Arnold in 1954.

On his first theatrical writing job, he co-wrote the lyrics for the musical revue Baker's Dozen in 1951. He wrote songs with Norman Martin for the Off-Broadway revue Put It in Writing (1962). He also worked with composer Paul Klein from the early 1950s onward, contributing songs to the cabaret revue Isn't America Fun (1959) and the Broadway revue From A to Z (1960), directed by Christopher Hewett.

Fred Ebb was the voice of the "Little Blue Man", on Betty Johnson's novelty song from 1958, repeating the words: "I Rov You... to Bits".

With Klein, Ebb wrote his first book musical, Morning Sun. Originally, Bob Fosse was attached as director. Fosse eventually withdrew from the project, and the show ran for 6 performances Off-Broadway in October 1963.

== Kander and Ebb ==
Music publisher Tommy Valando introduced Ebb to Kander in 1962. After a few songs such as "My Coloring Book", Kander and Ebb wrote a stage musical, Golden Gate, that was never produced. However, the quality of the score convinced producer Harold Prince to hire them for their first professional production, the George Abbott-directed musical Flora the Red Menace (1965), based on Lester Atwell's novel Love is Just Around the Corner. Although it won star Liza Minnelli a Tony Award, the show closed after only 87 performances.

Their second collaboration, Cabaret, was considerably more successful, running for 1,165-performances. Directed by Prince and based on the John Van Druten play I Am a Camera (which, in turn, was based on the writing of Christopher Isherwood), the musical starred Jill Haworth as Sally Bowles, Bert Convy as Clifford Bradshaw, Lotte Lenya as Fräulein Schneider and Joel Grey as the emcee. The original Broadway production opened on November 20, 1966 and won eight of the 11 Tony Awards for which it was nominated, including Best Musical and Best Score. Adapted into a film by Bob Fosse, it won eight Academy Awards, though not Best Picture. It was revived three times, first in 1987 with Grey reprising his role and again in 1998 in a long-running revival, originally starring Alan Cumming as the emcee and Natasha Richardson as Sally Bowles. The third revival began in 2014 and also starred Alan Cumming this time alongside Michelle Williams.

Their next few works were less successful: The Happy Time (1968), directed by Gower Champion and starring Robert Goulet, ran for less than a year. Zorba (1968), directed by Prince, also ran less than a year, though it was more successful in its 1983 revival; and 70, Girls, 70 (1971), which was originally intended as an off-Broadway production, closed after 35 performances.

In 1972, he wrote the television special, Liza with a Z for Liza Minnelli. In 1974, Kander, Ebb and Fosse contributed to a concert for Liza Minnelli on Broadway. In 1973 Ebb wrote the television special that marked Frank Sinatra's comeback from retirement, Magnavox Presents Frank Sinatra (also known as Ol' Blue Eyes Is Back). The show featured Sinatra and guest star Gene Kelly in duet on the song "Can't Do That Anymore", written by Ebb for his abandoned musical with Kander and Dale Wasserman, Wait for Me, World!. In 1975, the team wrote the score to Funny Lady, the sequel to Funny Girl.

Chicago (1975) had mixed reviews but ran for more than two years on Broadway. Starring Chita Rivera, Jerry Orbach and Gwen Verdon in her last Broadway role, it suffered from a cynical attitude, which contrasted with the record-breaking popularity of A Chorus Line. Though rumors of a film production directed again by Fosse were heard, the show was revived in 1996 as part of the Encores! staged concert series. A hit, the minimalist production transferred to Broadway, starring Ann Reinking (Roxie) and Bebe Neuwirth (Velma). The revival holds the record as the longest-running musical revival and the longest-running American musical in Broadway history. It is the second longest-running show in Broadway history, behind only The Phantom of the Opera, having played its 7,486th performance on November 23, 2014, surpassing Cats.

Ebb wrote the book for Shirley MacLaine’s Broadway solo revue in 1976. The following year, Kander and Ebb worked with Minnelli and Martin Scorsese twice: first, in the film New York, New York, which had them write what is their best-known song, the title track; and, again in The Act (1977) a musical about a fictional nightclub act. It ran for under ten months. After contributing a song to Phyllis Newman’s one-woman musical, The Madwoman of Central Park West (1979), the team wrote Woman of the Year (1981), which starred Lauren Bacall and won the team their second Tony Award for Best Score.

The Rink (1984) teamed Kander and Ebb again with Minnelli and Rivera. The cast also included Jason Alexander and Rob Marshall. Following the closure of the show after six months, Kander and Ebb would not produce new material, save for a song in Hay Fever in 1985, for nine years.

In 1991, the revue And The World Goes 'Round opened Off-Broadway, featuring Karen Ziemba, Susan Stroman and Scott Ellis. The team's musical adaptation of Kiss of the Spider Woman opened in 1993, starring Chita Rivera. Reunited with director Harold Prince, the show ran for more than two years and won them their third and last Tony Award for best score.

The team's last original work to reach Broadway during Ebb's life opened in 1997. Steel Pier brought together Ziemba, Ellis and Stroman and though the show was nominated for 11 Tonys, it won none and closed after two months. It also featured Kristin Chenoweth. In 1997, Ebb reworked lyrics to Richard Rodgers' melody for the television production of Cinderella. Two decades earlier, Ebb refused the opportunity to write the musical Rex with Rodgers.

The team had two works produced outside New York. Over & Over, an adaptation of the Thornton Wilder play The Skin of Our Teeth, was performed at the Signature Theatre in Arlington, Virginia in 1999 and was revamped for a 2007 staging by the Westport Country Playhouse under the title All About Us.

The Visit, starring Chita Rivera and John McMartin, was presented by the Goodman Theatre in Chicago, as well as the Signature Theatre in Arlington (with George Hearn replacing McMartin).

The story of the long collaboration between Fred Ebb and John Kander is told in James Leve's Kander and Ebb (2009). Through in-depth primary research and interviews with writers, producers, and various musical theater collaborators, Leve introduces the writing process of Kander and Ebb and explores the many revisions and stagings of their shows as each work moved from tryouts to Broadway.

== Death and legacy ==
Ebb died from a heart attack on September 11, 2004, at St. Luke's-Roosevelt Hospital Center in Manhattan. He was 76.

At the time of his death, Ebb was working on a new musical with Kander, Curtains: A Backstage Murder Mystery Musical Comedy. The project had already lost its book writer, Peter Stone, who died in 2003. The show's orchestrator, Michael Gibson, also died (in 2005) while the project was underway. Coincidentally, the show is about a series of deaths during the production of a Broadway musical.

Kander continued working on the project with a new librettist Rupert Holmes, writing new lyrics when necessary. The musical had its world premiere at the Ahmanson Theatre in Los Angeles in July 2006, and ran on Broadway at the Al Hirschfeld Theatre from March 2007 through June 2008.

At its 2007 ceremony, the Drama Desk honored Kander and the late Ebb with a special award for "42 years of excellence in advancing the art of the musical theater."

In 2010 The Scottsboro Boys, a musical with lyrics by Ebb, music by Kander, and book by David Thompson premiered, first Off-Broadway at the Vineyard Theatre, and then on Broadway at the Lyceum Theatre.

Ebb and Kander both were inducted into the American Theater Hall of Fame in 1991.

Ebb is interred in a mausoleum with Edwin “Eddie” Aldridge (1929–1997) and Martin Cohen (1926–1995) on the banks of Sylvan Water at Green-Wood Cemetery, a National Historic Landmark in Brooklyn, New York. In addition to the names and dates of each man, the phrase, "Together Forever" is chiseled on the front of the mausoleum. On June 14, 2014, Ebb was featured in the first gay-themed tour of Green-Wood Cemetery.

== Fred Ebb Award ==
The Fred Ebb Foundation, established in 2005 by instruction of Ebb's will, presents an annual award to an up-and-coming musical theatre writer (or team). The award has been presented for 21 consecutive years and, currently, awards a total of $75,000 to the winner(s) each year.

Year	Winner(s)
2025	Sophie Boyce, Veronica Mansour
2024	Cheeyang Ng, Eric Sorrels
2023	Freya Catrin Smith, Jack Williams
2022	Julia Riew
2021	Isabella Dawis, Tidtaya Sinutoke
2020	Michael R. Jackson, Benjamin Bonnema, Christopher Staskel
2019	Benjamin Velez, Angela Sclafani
2018	Will Reynolds, Eric Price
2017	Shaina Taub
2016	Thomas Mizer, Curtis Moore
2015	Stacey Luftig, Phillip Palmer
2014	Chris Miller, Nathan Tysen
2013	Michael Kooman, Christopher Dimond
2012	Sam Willmott
2011	Jeff Blumenkrantz
2010	Douglas J. Cohen
2009	Marcy Heisler, Zina Goldrich
2008	Adam Gwon
2007	Peter Mills
2006	Robert L. Freedman, Steven Lutvak
2005	John Bucchino
