= David Thompson (writer) =

American writer & playwright (born 1956)

- Born: September 29, 1956 (age 69); LaGrange, Illinois, U.S.
- Occupations: American writer, playwright, producer
- Years active: 1980s–present
- Spouse: Susan Thompson (m. 1982)
- Children: 3

David Thompson (born September 29, 1956) is an American writer, playwright, and producer. His notable theater productions include Chicago, The Scottsboro Boys, The Prince of Broadway, and New York, New York.

Thompson was born in La Grange, IL, and attended Lyons Township High School. Thompson is a graduate from Northwestern University's Medill School of Journalism. Thompson is a resident of Millburn, New Jersey.

== Early years ==
The son of two school teachers, Thompson was first introduced to theater through his family's summer theater company, The Troupe (now known as Rocky Mountain Repertory Theatre) in Grand Lake, Colorado. Started in the early 1960s by Thompson's father, David L. Thompson, The Troupe presented musicals and straight shows in repertory. Thompson and his five siblings were involved in all aspects of production.

After graduating from Northwestern University, Thompson lived in Chicago and worked at St. Nicholas Theatre and the Mayor's Office of Special Events. He then moved to New York, where he started his career at Circle Repertory Theater.

== Career ==
BROADWAY AND WEST END: Librettos for:

- 1997: Chicago, Music and Lyrics by John Kander and Fred Ebb, Directed by Walter Bobbie, Choreographed by Anne Reinking. Tony Award, Best Musical Revival, longest running American musical (Script Adaptation)
- 1997: Steel Pier, Music and Lyrics by John Kander and Fred Ebb, Directed by Scott Ellis, Choreographed by Susan Stroman. 11 Tony Nominations including “Best Book.” Richard Rodgers Theater
- 2001: Thou Shalt Not, Music and Lyrics by Harry Connick Jr., Directed and Choreographed by Susan Stroman, Lincoln Center
- 2011: The Scottsboro Boys, 12 Tony nominations including “Best Book,” Drama Desk Nomination, Outer Critics and Lucille Lortel Awards for “Best Musical,” Hull-Warriner Award, Lyceum Theater and the Vineyard Theatre
- 2014: The Scottsboro Boys, Music and Lyrics by John Kander and Fred Ebb, Directed and Choreographed by Susan Stroman, winner of London's Critic Circle Award, Evening Standard Award, Garrick Theatre and the Young Vic Theatre
- 2017: Prince of Broadway, Directed by Hal Prince, Choreographed by Susan Stroman, Samuel J. Friedman Theatre (Conceiver)
- 2020: Rags, Music by Charles Strousse, Lyrics by Stephen Schwartz, London's Park Theatre (New libretto)
- 2023: New York, New York, Music and Lyrics by John Kander and Fred Ebb, Additional Lyrics by Lin-Manuel Miranda, Co-Written by Sharon Washington, Directed and Choreographed by Susan Stroman. St. James Theater

OFF-BROADWAY/ REGIONAL: Librettos for:

- 1988: Flora, the Red Menace, Vineyard Theater, Drama Desk nomination, (New libretto)
- 1990: 70, Girls, 70, Chichester Festival, (New libretto)
- 1991 – 1992: And the World Goes ‘Round, Westside Theatre (Co-Conceiver), Winner of New York Drama Desk Award, Lucille Lortel Award, Outer Critics Circle Award
- 1991 – 2019: A Christmas Carol, McCarter Theater
- 2018: The Beast in the Jungle, Vineyard Theatre, Music by John Kander, directed and choreographed by Susan Stroman. Outer Critics nomination

TELEVISION credits for PBS include:

- 1992: Sondheim – A Celebration at Carnegie Hall (Writer)
- 1998: Razzle Dazzle, The Music of Kander and Ebb (Writer)
- 2018: Harold Prince – the Director’s Life (Co-Producer, Writer)

CONCERT credits at Carnegie Hall include:

- 1999: My Favorite Broadway/The Leading Ladies (Writer)
- 2011: James Taylor’s ‘Perspective Series’ (Producer, Writer)

== Awards and nominations ==
- 1988: Drama Desk Award Nomination, Flora, the Red Menace
- 1992: Winner of New York Drama Desk Award, And the World Goes 'Round
- 1992: Winner Lucille Lortel Award, Outer Critics Circle Award, And the World Goes 'Round
- 1992: Outer Critics Circle Award, And the World Goes 'Round
- 1997: Tony Award nomination for Best Book of a Musical, Steel Pier
- 2010: Drama Desk Award for Outstanding Book of a Musical, The Scottsboro Boys
- 2011: Tony Awards nomination for Best Book of a Musical, The Scottsboro Boys
- 2011: Lucille Lortel Award for Best Musical, The Scottsboro Boys
- 2014: London's Critic Circle Award, The Scottsboro Boys
- 2023: Tony Awards nomination for Best Book of a Musical, New York, New York
