= The Rink (musical) =

1984 musical by John Kander, Fred Ebb and Terrence McNally

- Original Recording
- Music: John Kander
- Lyrics: Fred Ebb
- Book: Terrence McNally
- Productions: 1984 Broadway; 1988 West End; 2018 Southwark Playhouse

The Rink is a musical with a book by Terrence McNally, lyrics by Fred Ebb, and music by John Kander, the tenth Kander and Ebb collaboration.

The musical focuses on Anna, the owner of a dilapidated roller skating rink on the boardwalk of a decaying seaside resort, who has decided to sell it to developers. Complicating her plans are her prodigal daughter Angel, who returns to town seeking to reconnect with the people and places she long ago left behind. Through a series of flashbacks, revelations, and minimal forward-moving plot development, the two deal with their pasts in their attempt to reconcile and move on with their lives.

== Production history ==
=== Background ===
The musical began as a small off-Broadway musical with music by Kander and Ebb, the book by Albert Innaurato, and direction by Arthur Laurents, focusing on an Italian-American mother and her estranged daughter. As the project was not doing well, Terrence McNally was brought in to write the book and Laurents left. In place of the intimate musical, there were now a small male chorus and large sets.

=== Productions ===
The musical opened on Broadway on February 9, 1984 at the Martin Beck Theatre, where it ran for 204 performances and 29 previews. The production was directed by A. J. Antoon, with choreography by Graciela Daniele, set design by Peter Larkin, costume design by Theoni V. Aldredge, lighting design by Marc B. Weiss, sound design by Otts Munderloh, and musical direction by Paul Gemignani.

Despite the presence of box-office draws Liza Minnelli (as Angel) and Chita Rivera (as Anna), it could not overcome the mostly negative reviews. The cast also included Jason Alexander (Lino/Lenny/Punk/Uncle Fausto), Kim Hauser (Little Girl), Mel Johnson, Jr. (Buddy/Hiram/Mrs. Jackson/Charlie/Suitor/Junior Miller), Scott Holmes (Guy/Dino/Father Rocco/Debbie Duberman), Scott Ellis (Lucky/Sugar/Punk/Arnie/Suitor/Bobby Perillo/Danny/Additional singer), Frank Mastrocola (Tony/Tom/Punk/Suitor/Peter Reilly), Ronn Carroll (Ben/Dino's Father/Sister Philomena), and Rob Marshall (additional singers). Stockard Channing replaced Liza Minnelli as of July 14, 1984.

The musical had an engagement in the West End at the Cambridge Theatre, opening on February 17, 1988 through March 19, 1988, running for 38 performances. Josephine Blake and Diane Langton starred as Anna and Angel. This production, directed by Paul Kerryson, whilst not successful at the large Cambridge Theatre in London, had enjoyed sell out success at the smaller Forum Theatre in Manchester in 1987, where its run had been extended. On the day that notices were issued that the show was to close, the cast, orchestra and crew staged a sit-in at the Cambridge Theatre to protest that low audience numbers were due to the poor marketing and media engagement by the producers. Blake and Langton appeared on Alan Titchmarsh's daytime TV show to raise awareness of the show.

Kerryson revived the show at the Leicester Haymarket in 1998 starring Kathryn Evans and Linzi Hateley.

Diane Langton returned to the show in 2004, this time playing Anna, at the Belgrade Theatre in Coventry.

Porchlight Music Theatre presented The Rink as a part of their "Porchlight Revisits" season in which they stage three forgotten musicals per year. It was in Chicago, Illinois in October 2016. It was directed and choreographed by Christopher Pazdernik and music directed by Ryan Brewster.

Caroline O'Connor (who understudied Diane Langton as Angel in the 1988 London production before starring in Chicago, Mack and Mabel and Anastasia) played the role of Anna in a revival at London's Southwark Playhouse in May 2018, directed by Adam Lenson.

Neglected Musicals, a "a theatre initiative dedicated to presenting musical theatre that has never (or rarely) been seen in Australia", staged a production of the show at the Hayes Theatre in Sydney from 30 September to 2 October 2026. Featuring a cast performing with scripts in hand and piano accompaniment, the role of Anna was played by Katrina Retallick and Shannen Alyce Quan as Angel.

== Response ==
In The New York Times, critic Frank Rich praised Rivera but described the show as "turgid" and "sour," filled with "phony, at times mean-spirited content" and "empty pretensions." Of the book, he wrote, "Mr. McNally is a smart and witty playwright, but you'd never know it from this synthetic effort. His dialogue is banal, and his characters are ciphers."

Reacting to the bad reviews, the show's composer, John Kander, commented that the show "was the most complete realization" of his intentions of any production he had done. Lyricist Fred Ebb agreed, asserting that "Every single element of it was exactly as we imagined. Up there on the stage were two of my best friends, Liza and Chita. It was an overwhelming experience; and when they weren't treated well, it was as if we had gotten attacked on the street.... That show hurt me more than any show I've written.... I felt that I had let them down."

== Musical numbers ==
Act I

- "Colored Lights" – Angel
- "Chief Cook and Bottle Washer" – Anna
- "Don't Ah Ma Me" – Anna and Angel
- "Blue Crystal" – Dino
- "Under the Roller Coaster" – Angel
- "Not Enough Magic" – Dino, Angel, Anna, Sugar, Hiram, Tom, Lenny, and Dino's Father
- "We Can Make It" – Anna
- "After All These Years" – The Wreckers
- "Angel's Rink and Social Center" – Angel and The Wreckers
- "What Happened to the Old Days?" – Anna, Mrs. Silverman, and Mrs. Jackson

Act II

- "The Apple Doesn't Fall (Very Far From the Tree)" – Anna and Angel
- "Marry Me" – Lenny
- "Mrs. A" – Anna, Angel, Lenny, and Suitors
- "The Rink" – The Wreckers
- "Wallflower" – Anna and Angel
- "All the Children in a Row" – Angel and Danny
- "Finale" – Anna and Angel

== Awards and nominations ==
=== Original Broadway production ===
Year	Award ceremony	Category	Nominee	Result
1984	Tony Award	Best Original Score	John Kander & Fred Ebb	Nominated
1984	Tony Award	Best Performance by a Leading Actress in a Musical	Chita Rivera	Won
1984	Tony Award	Best Performance by a Leading Actress in a Musical	Liza Minnelli	Nominated
1984	Tony Award	Best Choreography	Graciela Daniele	Nominated
1984	Tony Award	Best Scenic Design	Peter Larkin	Nominated
1984	Drama Desk Award	Outstanding Musical		Nominated
1984	Drama Desk Award	Outstanding Actress in a Musical	Chita Rivera	Won
1984	Drama Desk Award	Outstanding Actress in a Musical	Liza Minnelli	Nominated
1984	Drama Desk Award	Outstanding Director of a Musical	A.J. Antoon	Nominated
1984	Drama Desk Award	Outstanding Set Design	Peter Larkin	Nominated
1984	Drama Desk Award	Outstanding Lighting Design	Marc B. Weiss	Nominated
