= Lester Atwell =

American novelist

Lester Atwell (July 31, 1908 – April 30, 2001) was a novelist, short-story writer and US veteran from Brooklyn. His most notable works include Private, Love is Just Around the Corner and Life with its Sorrow, Life with its Tear.

== Military service ==
At the age of 34 Atwell was drafted in the Army to serve in World War II. As an infantryman in the 87th Infantry Division he was active in the European theater, and fought in Ardennes as part of the Battle of the Bulge.

== Works ==
Atwell's 1958 book Private serves as his personal war diary, and recounts his service in World War II. The work has been described as being "as complete and accurate a picture of men in and awaiting combat as one is likely to find." The work was runner-up for the National Book Critics Circle Award in 1959 in the nonfiction category.

Atwell's Love is Just Around the Corner served as the basis for the Broadway musical Flora the Red Menace. His third book Life With Its Sorrow, Life With Its Tear was published in 1971, and his short stories have appeared in publications including The Saturday Evening Post and Collier's.

His last novel The Other Dear Charmer was written at the age of 82.

== Death ==
Atwell died of natural causes at the age of 92 in Cary, North Carolina.
