= Flora the Red Menace =

- Poster of the 1965 musical
- Music: John Kander
- Lyrics: Fred Ebb
- Book: George Abbott and Robert Russell revised by David Thompson
- Basis: Love is Just Around the Corner by Lester Atwell
- Productions: 1965 Broadway; 1987 off-Broadway

Flora the Red Menace is a musical with a book by George Abbott and Robert Russell, music by John Kander, and lyrics by Fred Ebb. The original 1965 production starred Liza Minnelli in the title role in her Broadway debut, for which she won a Tony Award for Best Actress in a Musical. The show marked the first collaboration of Kander and Ebb, who went on to write the Broadway and Hollywood hits Cabaret and Chicago.

While only two numbers ("A Quiet Thing" and "Sing Happy") became notable outside the show, the score does present a valuable insight into the later work of Kander and Ebb: like Cabaret and Chicago, it features a headstrong heroine and has a strong dose of political content.

== Productions ==
Flora the Red Menace opened on Broadway at the Alvin Theatre on May 11, 1965, and closed on July 24, 1965, after 87 performances. The cast featured Liza Minnelli as Flora, Bob Dishy as Harry Toukarian and Cathryn Damon as Comrade Charlotte. Direction was by George Abbott, choreography by Lee Theodore, with scenic design by William and Jean Eckart, costume design by Donald Brooks and lighting design by Tharon Musser. The poster art was by cartoonist-playwright Herb Gardner.

Liza Minnelli won the Tony Award for Best Actress in a Musical, the youngest person to have done so at age 19.

Flora was not written for Minnelli, as is sometimes said; Robert Russell was rumored to have written the show as a vehicle for Barbra Streisand. George Abbott became involved, thinking it would be a vehicle for Eydie Gormé. Receiving promising out-of-town reviews in New Haven and Boston, the show was recorded two days before its Broadway opening. However, the New York critics were not enthusiastic, and when it closed it had lost almost all of its $400,000 investment.

The New York Times reviewer wrote: "The voice [of Minnelli] is not yet distinctive ... She is going to be a popular singer, all right. It [Flora the Red Menace] has the appearance of being pasted together with bits and pieces. A promising idea has not been enlivened by a creative spark."

On 24 December 1978, Camera Three aired Songs from "Flora the Red Menace", with Lenora Nemetz, Mary Louise Wilson, Laurence Guittard, and Bob Dishy.

The musical was revived at the off-Broadway Vineyard Theatre in December 1987 with a new book by David Thompson. Directed by Scott Ellis with choreography by Susan Stroman, Flora was played by Veanne Cox with Peter Frechette as Harry. In the Vineyard Theatre revival, the story was told as though in a presentation by the Federal Theatre Project, part of the Works Progress Administration (WPA) established by President Roosevelt (voiced by Art Carney). A company of actors played all the roles, with obvious props and scenery, not trying to hide the "amateur" look and feel of the show.

Other notable productions include:

- Royal Academy of Dramatic Art, George Bernard Shaw Theatre, London, UK, 1991-1992
- Brighton Little Theatre, UK, 1998, directed by Simon Cross and musically directed by Gary Nock.
- Dundee Repertory Theatre, Scotland, autumn 2003.
- 42nd Street Moon (San Francisco, California) presented the musical in concert in November – December 2006.
- Reprise Theatre Company, Freud Playhouse, University of California, Los Angeles; May 6 through May 18, 2008, with Eden Espinosa as Flora, Megan Lawrence as Charlotte, Manoel Felciano as Harry Toukarian.
- Oberlin College, 2011, notable for John Kander returning to his alma mater to consult on the production.
- Royal Welsh College of Music & Drama, Richard Burton Theatre, March 2023, directed by Georgie Rankcom.

== Plot synopsis ==
In the winter of 1935, many people are unemployed due to the Great Depression, yet they seem to have hope ("Prologue"). Valedictorian and future fashion designer Flora Meszaros inspires and leads her graduating class in taking charge of the future before them ("Unafraid"). She applies at Gimbel's, Saks Fifth Avenue, Macy's and Altman's before finally applying at Garret and Mellick's where she meets Harry Toukarian, a fellow artist who stutters when he's nervous. When she learns that the boss, Mr. Stanley, isn't hiring, Flora tries impressing the secretary by saying that she is "the most amazing miss in all of New York City." ("The Kid Herself"). During the song, Flora, Harry and the other artists sneak their designs into a box of Mr. Stanley's merchandise, and after the secretary kicks them out, Flora asks Harry to coffee. The coffee date conversation starts about Flora's previous employer, who paid her through the barter system and she ended up having to dig cemetery plots. Harry asks why she didn't strike, and explains the concept to her after she shows incomprehension. This ends up with Flora punching Harry in the face and, after initial refusal, taking him to her studio. Flora rents out her studio to other artists, like a dancer named Maggie and her ex-boyfriend Kenny ("All I Need is One Good Break").

Headstrong wannabe fashion designer Flora Meszaros is a member of an artists' co-operative of bohemian types – dancers, musicians, designers – struggling to find work during the Great Depression. Hoping to find a job which pays at least $15 a week, she is hired by the head of a large department store at $30. She falls in love with Harry Toukarian, another struggling designer, who attempts to convert Flora to his communist ideals.

Although it compromises her job in an organization that does not recognize the new unions, she seeks to hold down both job and relationship. Complicating matters is a predatory communist matriarch, Comrade Charlotte, who wants Harry for herself, a secretary with designs on her boss, and Kenny and Maggie, a jazz dancing duo with their sights on greater things. In the end, however, Flora finds herself torn between two vastly different ideals, and has to sacrifice one or the other for true happiness.

== Songs ==
Act I

- Prologue – Ensemble
- "Unafraid" – Flora, Students and Ensemble
- "All I Need is One Good Break" – Flora, Harry Toukarian and Artists
- "Not Every Day of the Week" – Flora and Harry Toukarian
- "All I Need is One Good Break" (Reprise) – Flora, Elsa and The Lady
- "Sign Here" – Harry Toukarian
- "The Flame" – Comrade Ada, Harry Toukarian and Comrades
- "Palomino Pal" – The Lady and Cowboy
- "A Quiet Thing" – Flora
- "Hello, Waves" – Harry Toukarian and Flora
- "Dear Love" – Flora and Ensemble

Act II

- "Express Yourself" – Comrade Charlotte and Harry Toukarian
- "Knock, Knock" – Comrade Ada and Cowboy
- "Comrade Charlotte's Ballet (The Tree of Life)" – Comrade Charlotte, Comrade Ada, Harry Toukarian and Ensemble
- "Sing Happy" – Flora
- "You Are You" – Mr. Weiss, Elsa, Flora, Mr. Stanley, Lulu, Katie and Joe
- Finale – Entire Company

== Recordings ==
The original Broadway cast recording was released by RCA Victor Broadway in May 1965; a CD was released March 10, 1992.

The 1987 off-Broadway cast recording is also available on CD.

== Awards and nominations ==
=== Original Broadway production ===
Year	Award	Category	Nominee	Result
1965	Tony Award	Best Performance by a Leading Actress in a Musical	Liza Minnelli	Won

== See also ==
- List of musicals: A to L
