= Tony Yazbeck =

American actor, singer, and dancer

- Born: March 14, 1979 (age 47); Riverside, California, United States
- Education: Point Park University; University of Cincinnati (BFA)
- Occupations: Actor, singer, dancer

Tony Yazbeck (born March 14, 1979) is an American actor, singer, and dancer, best known for his work on the Broadway stage, including the revival of On the Town, for which he received 2015 Tony Award and Outer Critics Circle Award nominations for lead actor in a musical. Yazbeck is also known for his principal roles on Broadway, including J.M. Barrie in the Broadway production of Finding Neverland, Tulsa in Gypsy starring Patti LuPone, Billy Flynn in Chicago, Phil Davis in White Christmas, Al Deluca in A Chorus Line and the original casts of Broadway's Never Gonna Dance and Oklahoma (2002 revival). In 2014 he appeared in a concert version of Kiss Me, Kate with the John Wilson Orchestra at the Royal Albert Hall, London as part of that season's Promenade Concerts. In 2020, Yazbeck originated a leading role in the musical Flying Over Sunset, directed by James Lapine. The production began in 2021 at the Vivian Beaumont Theatre. Production was delayed because of the COVID-19 shutdown of Broadway.

Yazbeck made his Broadway debut at the age of eleven playing a newsboy in the revival of Gypsy starring Tyne Daly. On television he was featured on NBC's Smash, and he appeared in the feature documentary Every Little Step about the casting process for the 2006 revival of A Chorus Line on Broadway. Yazbeck is on the board of the YOUNG/ARTS program of the National Foundation for Advancement in the Arts.

== Personal life ==
Born in Riverside, California, he grew up in Pennsylvania and Florida before moving to New York. He attended University of Cincinnati College-Conservatory of Music and Point Park University.

Yazbeck is of Lebanese descent through his father, and has German, Irish, Ukrainian and Romanian ancestry on his mother's side.

== Broadway ==
Year	Title	Role	Location
1989	Gypsy	Newsboy	Marquis Theatre
2002	Oklahoma!	Swing u/s Ali	Gershwin Theatre
2003-04	Never Gonna Dance	Ensemble (replacement)	Broadhurst Theatre
2006-07	A Chorus Line	Al DeLuca	Gerald Schoenfeld Theatre
2008-09	Gypsy	Tulsa	St. James Theatre
2009	White Christmas	Phil Davis	Marquis Theatre
2011, 2012, 2017	Chicago	Billy Flynn	Ambassador Theatre
2014-15	On The Town	Gabey	Lyric Theatre
2016	Finding Neverland	J.M. Barrie	Lunt-Fontanne Theatre
2017	Prince of Broadway	Various	Samuel J. Friedman Theatre
2021-22	Flying Over Sunset	Cary Grant	Vivian Beaumont Theatre
2025	A Chorus Line	Zach	Shubert Theatre

== Other theatre ==
Year	Title	Role	Location	Notes
2000-01	Annie Get Your Gun	Ensemble (replacement)	—N/a	National tour
2003	Thoroughly Modern Millie	Ensemble	—N/a	National tour
2005	Doctor Dolittle	Matthew Mugg	—N/a	National tour
2006	Fanny Hill	Charles Waneigh	York Theatre Company	Off-Broadway
2007	On The Town	Gabey	New York City Center	Encores!
2009	Animal Crackers	Wally Winston/Monsieur Doucet	Goodman Theatre	Chicago, IL
2010	Sycamore Trees	Andrew	Signature Theatre	Washington, D.C.
2011	My One and Only	Billy	Goodspeed Musicals	East Haddam, Connecticut
2014	Little Me	George Musgrove	New York City Center	Encores!
2014	Kiss Me, Kate	Bill Calhoun / Lucentio	Royal Albert Hall	London, UK
2018	A Chorus Line	Zach	New York City Center	Annual Gala Presentation
2019	The Scarlet Pimpernel	Sir Percy Blakeney	Lincoln Center	Concert
2019	The Cradle Will Rock	Harry / Larry	Classic Stage Company	Off-Broadway
2026	City of Angels	Stone	Ogunquit Playhouse	Oqunquit, ME

== Awards and nominations ==
Year	Award	Category	Work	Result
2008	Outer Critics Circle Award	Outstanding Featured Actor in a Musical	Gypsy	Nominated
2015	Tony Award	Best Actor in a Musical	On the Town	Nominated
2015	Drama League Award	Distinguished Performance	On the Town	Nominated
2015	Astaire Award	Best Male Dancer	On the Town	Won
2015	Outer Critics Circle Award	Outstanding Actor in a Musical	On the Town	Nominated
2018	Chita Rivera Award	Outstanding Male Dancer in a Broadway Show	Prince of Broadway	Won
2018	Outer Critics Circle Award	Outstanding Featured Actor in a Musical	Prince of Broadway	Nominated
2018	Drama Desk Award	Outstanding Featured Actor in a Musical	Prince of Broadway	Nominated
2022	Chita Rivera Award	Outstanding Male Dancer in a Broadway Show	Flying Over Sunset	Nominated
