= Scott Ellis =

American director

- Born: April 19, 1957 (age 69); Washington, DC, U.S.
- Education: Art Institute of Chicago (BFA)
- Occupations: Director, executive producer, actor
- Years active: 1980–present

Scott Ellis (born April 19, 1957) is an American stage director, actor, and television director.

== Life and career ==
Ellis graduated from Goodman School of Drama at the Art Institute of Chicago (now at DePaul University) in Chicago. He also graduated from James W. Robinson Secondary School, in Fairfax, Virginia, in 1975. He studied acting at HB Studio in New York City. Ellis has a twin brother named Mark Ellis, who is the Executive Director of the International Bar Association.

Before he became a director, Ellis was a successful stage actor; he performed on Broadway in the original casts of the 1980 original musical Musical Chairs and The Rink with Liza Minnelli and Chita Rivera.

He has directed numerous Off-Broadway and Broadway productions, as well as the New York City Opera Company revivals at the New York State Theater of A Little Night Music (1990) and 110 in the Shade (1992).

Ellis has been the Associate Artistic Director for the Roundabout Theatre since 1998.

He has been nominated for the Tony Award as Best Director nine times for a revival of She Loves Me (1994), Steel Pier (1997), a revival of 1776 (1998), Twelve Angry Men (2005), Curtains (2007), a revival of The Mystery of Edwin Drood (2013), a revival of You Can't Take It with You (2015), another revival of She Loves Me (2016), and Tootsie (2019). He received the 1991 Drama Desk Award, Outstanding Director of a Musical, for And The World Goes Round. He won the Olivier Award as Best Director, Musical, for She Loves Me.

He was the executive producer for the television drama Weeds on Showtime, and has directed television episodes of Modern Family, Nurse Jackie, The Good Wife, Hung, 30 Rock, Desperate Housewives, The Closer and Frasier. He received an Emmy Award nomination in 2007 for directing the episode "The Break-Up" of the comedy series 30 Rock.

In 2010, Playbill announced that Ellis was expected to direct upcoming musical adaptations of the 1930s films The Blue Angel and Little Miss Marker. Both would have books by David Thompson.

He played the role of Leonard Bernstein's manager Harry Kraut in the biopic Maestro (2023).

== Credits ==
=== Stage ===
==== As actor ====
Year	Title	Role	Notes
1978	Grease	Doody	
1980	Musical Chairs	Sally's Boyfriend	
1984	The Rink	Various	
1987	Billy Bishop Goes to War	Billy Bishop	

==== As director ====
Year	Title	Notes
1991	And the World Goes 'Round	
1993	She Loves Me	
1995	A Month in the Country	
1997	Steel Pier	
1997	1776	
1998	Present Laughter	
1999	The Rainmaker	
2002	The Man Who Had All the Luck	
2002	The Boys from Syracuse	
2004	Twelve Angry Men	
2006	The Little Dog Laughed	
2007	Curtains	
2011	Gruesome Playground Injuries	
2012	Harvey	
2012	The Mystery of Edwin Drood	
2014	You Can't Take It with You	
2014	The Elephant Man	
2015	On the Twentieth Century	
2016	She Loves Me	
2019	Kiss Me, Kate	
2019	Tootsie	
2022	Take Me Out	
2024	Doubt	
2025	Pirates: The Penzance Musical	

=== Television ===
Year	Title	Notes
2000–04	Frasier	
2003	Charlie Lawrence	
2005–06	Hope & Faith	
2005	Out of Practice	
2005–06	Stacked	
2006–09	30 Rock	
2007–09	The Closer	
2008	Desperate Housewives	
2008–11	Weeds	
2009	Trust Me	
2009	Hung	
2009	Nurse Jackie	
2009	The Good Wife	Episode: "Home"
2010	Running Wilde	
2010–11	Modern Family	
2011	Mad Love	
2011–13	2 Broke Girls	
2012	Guys with Kids	
2012–13	The New Normal	
2013–14	The Michael J. Fox Show	
2013	Dads	Episode: "Comic Book Issues"
2014	Mixology	Episode: "Dominic & Stacey"
2014	Undateable	
2015	Us & Them	Episode: "Upstairs & Downstairs"
2015	One Big Happy	Episode: "Pilot"
2015–16	Dr. Ken	
2017	Superior Donuts	
2017–23	The Marvelous Mrs. Maisel	
2017	A Christmas Story Live!	
2018	Divorce	
2019	Fam	
2019–20	Carol's Second Act	
2020–21	All Rise	
2020	Tommy	Episode: "Cause of Death"
2021–22	B Positive	
2022	East New York	
2022–23	Julia	
2025	Etoile	
2026	Elsbeth	2 episodes
