= Brandon Victor Dixon =

American actor & producer (born 1981)

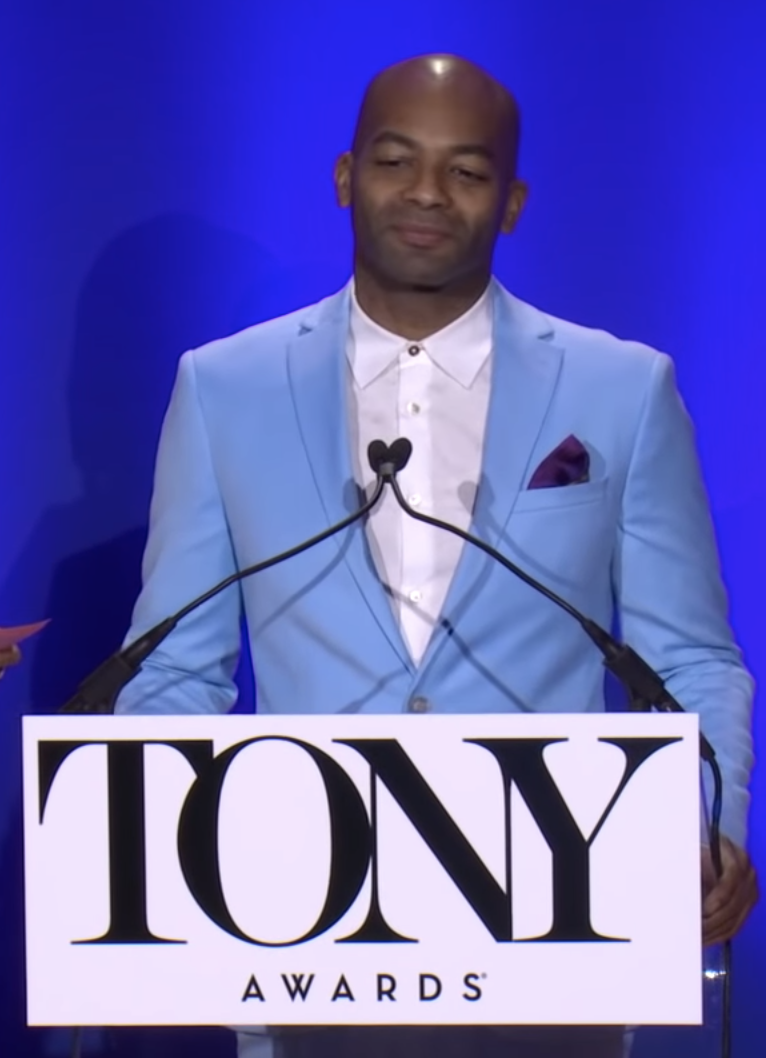
- Dixon at the 73rd Tony Awards nominations announcement, 2019
- Born: September 23, 1981 (age 44); Gaithersburg, Maryland, U.S.
- Education: Columbia University (BA)
- Occupations: Actor, singer, producer
- Years active: 2003–present
- Known for: The Scottsboro Boys; The Color Purple; Hamilton; Rent; Jesus Christ Superstar Live in Concert
- Website: BrandonVictorDixon.com

Brandon Victor Dixon (born September 23, 1981) is an American actor, singer and theatrical producer. As a musical theatre actor, he is known for Tony Award-nominated Broadway performances as Harpo in the 2005 musical The Color Purple, Eubie Blake in Shuffle Along, or, the Making of the Musical Sensation of 1921 and All That Followed (2016), and Davis in Hell's Kitchen (2023). He originated all three roles, as well as the leading role of Berry Gordy Jr. in Motown: The Musical (2013) on Broadway, which earned a nomination for a Grammy Award for Best Musical Theater Album. In 2016, Dixon assumed the role of Aaron Burr in the Broadway company of Hamilton. Dixon played the role of Hayward Patterson in The Scottsboro Boys off-Broadway as well as in London's West End and was nominated for a 2014 Laurence Olivier Award for Best Actor in a Leading Role in a Musical.

As a producer, Dixon's credits include Broadway revivals of Hedwig and the Angry Inch and Of Mice and Men (2014); the former won the 2014 Tony Award and the Drama Desk Award for best revival of a musical.

In 2018, Dixon portrayed Judas Iscariot in NBC's live concert version of Andrew Lloyd Webber and Tim Rice's rock opera Jesus Christ Superstar, for which he received a Primetime Emmy Award nomination for Outstanding Actor in a Supporting Role in a Limited or Anthology Series or Movie.

== Early life and education ==
Dixon was born in Gaithersburg, Maryland on September 23, 1981, and attended the St. Albans School and Columbia University, where he graduated in 2003. He attended the British American Drama Academy at Balliol College, Oxford, England, in mid-1999.

Dixon has noted Ragtime was the "first ever [Broadway] show I saw."

== Career ==
=== Theater ===
==== Early performances ====
In 2003, Dixon played Royal in the Encores! production of House of Flowers and adult Simba in the national touring company of The Lion King, a role he landed immediately after graduating from Columbia.

==== The Color Purple ====
In 2005, Dixon created the role of Harpo on Broadway in the musical The Color Purple, for which he was nominated for a Tony Award for Best Featured Actor in a Musical. In The New York Times, theater critic Ben Brantley's review compared Dixon to castmates Felicia P. Fields and Elisabeth Withers-Mendes in the way the latter two "exude a sensual energy that you can feel the audience wants to luxuriate in. (The same impression is cut, in a sunnier vein, by Brandon Victor Dixon[...])".

Dixon subsequently joined the show's touring company. In a 2009 review, The Boston Globe noted the men in the cast were given less to work than the show's women, but said Dixon's performance was nevertheless "lithe and amusing," played to "superb comedic effect."

==== The Scottsboro Boys ====
In 2010, Dixon originated the role of Haywood Patterson in the Off-Broadway production of the musical The Scottsboro Boys, for which he was nominated for the Drama Desk Award for Outstanding Actor in a Musical. In a review for Variety, David Rooney said, "Haywood Patterson['s] fierce pride and refusal to die for a lie provides an affecting center to the show in Brandon Victor Dixon’s charismatic performance." In the Times, Brantley said, "Brandon Victor Dixon gives the show a shot of soft-pedaled star power. His 11 o’clock number, an angry what-I-stand-for anthem, is especially affecting."

In 2014, Dixon returned to the role of Haywood Patterson in London's West End production of The Scottsboro Boys.

==== Hamilton ====
Dixon assumed the lead role of Aaron Burr in the Broadway company of Hamilton on August 23, 2016, recruited in part by the role's originator, Leslie Odom, Jr., and selected over the role's three understudies when Dixon became available following the early close of Shuffle Along. Previously Dixon had performed with Hamilton castmate Renée Elise Goldsberry in The Color Purple, as well as other members of the cast, including Christopher Jackson, Ephraim Sykes, and Sasha Hutchings, in workshops and festivals. Dixon played the role of Burr through August 13, 2017.

Reviewing the show in June 2017 for Deadline Hollywood, Jeremy Gerard said that Dixon and other replacements merited comparison with the original cast for the former's development of distinct but no less compelling interpretations of their characters: "Hamilton’s nemesis, Aaron Burr, is played by the exceptionally fine Brandon Victor Dixon replacing Leslie Odom Jr. The latter was steel cloaked in suavity, while Dixon is more severe in the opening number, which gives us both Hamilton’s back story and the seeds of a rivalry that will only conclude in a duel on the New Jersey shore many decades later. Delivering what is, to my mind, the show’s most astonishing number, 'The Room Where It Happens,' Dixon’s another knockout."

In November 2016, shortly after the U.S. presidential election, Republican Vice President-elect Mike Pence attended Hamilton and Dixon addressed him from the stage following the performance, thanking him for attending and stating: "We, sir—we—are the diverse America who are alarmed and anxious that your new administration will not protect us, our planet, our children, our parents, or defend us and uphold our inalienable rights. We truly hope that this show has inspired you to uphold our American values and to work on behalf of all of us." This statement was jointly written by the cast, show creator Lin-Manuel Miranda, and producer Jeffrey Seller. Pence stated that he was not offended, but President-elect Donald Trump demanded an apology for the "harassment" of Pence.

==== Hell's Kitchen ====
From October to January, Dixon starred as Davis in the world premiere Off-Broadway run of Hell's Kitchen at The Public Theater. He reprised his role in the Broadway transfer at the Shubert Theatre which began performances in March 2024. He was nominated for the Tony Award for Best Featured Actor in a Musical for his performance. His final performance of his first stint in the show was on March 9, 2025. He's set to return to the cast for the production's final month of performances on January 27, 2026.

==== Other shows ====
In 2011, Dixon portrayed Tom Collins in the Off-Broadway revival of Rent.

Dixon created the role of Berry Gordy Jr., founder of the Motown record label, in the original Broadway production of Motown: The Musical, which Gordy wrote himself. The show opened at the Lunt-Fontanne Theatre on April 14, 2013. His first leading role on Broadway, critics described it as a "tough, sketchy assignment" in what they felt was a flawed show, but Dixon nevertheless earned a nomination for a Drama League Award for Distinguished Performance.

In 2016, Dixon appeared in the role of Eubie Blake in the musical Shuffle Along, or, the Making of the Musical Sensation of 1921 and All That Followed on Broadway at the Music Box Theatre. He was nominated for the Tony Award for Best Performance by an Actor in a Featured Role in a Musical for his performance. Also in 2016, he appeared as Coalhouse Walker Jr in Ragtime at Ellis Island. In January and February 2020, he played Dan in Next to Normal at the Kennedy Center.

From September to November 2022, he played Billy Flynn in the Broadway production of Chicago.

=== Producing ===
In 2013, Dixon and Motown the Musical choreographer Warren Adams founded WalkRunFly Productions to support productions for young artists. Through WalkRunFly Productions, he co-produced the 2014 Broadway productions of Of Mice and Men, which was nominated for the Drama Desk Award for Outstanding Revival of a Play, and Hedwig and the Angry Inch, which won the Tony Award for Best Revival of a Musical as well as the Drama Desk Award for Outstanding Revival of a Musical.

As of January 2017, WalkRunFly has two more shows in development: a transfer to Broadway of Whorl Inside a Loop, a play by Dick Scanlan and Sherie Rene Scott set in a prison, and Trial of the Century, a musical about the Lindbergh baby kidnapping.

=== Television ===
In addition to his theater work, Dixon began a recurring role on Starz series, Power, in 2017 as attorney Terry Silver. He was promoted to a series regular in the fifth season, aired in 2018.

Dixon portrayed Judas Iscariot in the live televised concert production of Jesus Christ Superstar on April 1, 2018, Easter Sunday. Reviewing the show for New York magazine, Matt Zoller Seitz named Dixon as giving one of the “strongest performances” in what Zoller Seitz called "one of the most impressive things I’ve seen in the 20-plus years I’ve been writing about TV." He found Dixon and castmates John Legend, Sara Bareilles, Norm Lewis and Jin Ha “so superb, in terms of their acting as well as their singing, that they diminished other performers who might have been singled out as scene-stealers in lesser productions, such as Alice Cooper’s King Herod.” In The New York Times, Noel Murray gave a similar rave review, calling the production "a conceptual and artistic triumph" and Dixon its "powerful and charismatic" standout: "Given what 'Jesus Christ Superstar' ultimately says about idols and the people in their shadow, it is appropriate that this production was dominated by Dixon's portrayal of Judas."

Dixon has also appeared on television in The Good Wife and in the 40th Annual Kennedy Center Honors.

In 2019, Dixon appeared in another televised concert production, Fox’s Rent: Live reprising the role of Tom Collins.

== Personal life ==
Dixon lives in New York City. In 2019, he delivered the Columbia College Class Day speech.

== Theatre credits ==
Ref:

Years	Title	Role	Venue	Notes
2003-2004	The Lion King	Simba	Cadillac Palace Theatre	
2005-2007	The Color Purple	Harpo	Broadway Theatre, Broadway	
2009	The Color Purple	Harpo	US National Tour	Replacement
2010	The Scottsboro Boys	Haywood Patterson	Vineyard Theatre, Off-Broadway	
2011-2012	Rent	Tom Collins	New World Stages, Off-Broadway	Replacement
2013-2014	Motown: The Musical	Berry Gordy	Lunt-Fontanne Theatre, Broadway	
2014	Of Mice and Men	-	Longacre Theatre, Broadway	Producer
2014-2015	Hedwig and the Angry Inch	-	Belasco Theatre, Broadway	Producer
2014-2015	The Scottsboro Boys	Haywood Patterson	Garrick Theatre, West End	
2015	The Wild Party	Mr. Black	New York City Center, Off-Broadway	
2016	Shuffle Along, or, the Making of the Musical Sensation of 1921 and All That Followed	Eubie Blake	Music Box Theatre, Broadway	
2016	Ragtime	Coalhouse Walker, Jr.	Ellis Island	Concert
2016-2017	Hamilton	Aaron Burr	Richard Rodgers Theatre, Broadway	Replacement
2016-2017	Hedwig and the Angry Inch	-	US National Tour	Producer
2018	Jesus Christ Superstar	Judas Iscariot	Los Angeles Theatre	
2019-2026	Moulin Rouge! The Musical	-	Al Hirschfeld Theatre, Broadway	Producer
2020	Next to Normal	Dan Goodman	Kennedy Center	
2022-2026	Moulin Rouge! The Musical	-	US National Tour	Producer
2022	Chicago	Billy Flynn	Ambassador Theatre, Broadway	Replacement
2023-2024	Hell's Kitchen	Davis	The Public Theater, Off-Broadway	
2024-2025	Hell's Kitchen	Davis	Shubert Theatre, Broadway	
2026	Hell's Kitchen	Davis	Shubert Theatre, Broadway	Replacement
2026	Shuffle Along	Eubie Blake	Lincoln Center	Reunion Concert

== Accolades ==
Year	Award	Category	Work	Result
2006	Tony Award	Best Actor in a Featured Role in a Musical	The Color Purple	Nominated
2010	Drama Desk Award	Outstanding Actor in a Leading Role in a Musical	The Scottsboro Boys	Nominated
2014	Grammy Award	Best Musical Theater Album (as principal soloist)	Motown: The Musical	Nominated
2014	Tony Award	Best Revival of a Musical	Hedwig and the Angry Inch †	Won
2014	Drama Desk Award	Outstanding Revival of a Musical	Hedwig and the Angry Inch †	Won
2014	Drama Desk Award	Outstanding Revival of a Play	Of Mice and Men †	Nominated
2015	Laurence Olivier Awards	Laurence Olivier Award for Best Actor in a Leading Role in a Musical	The Scottsboro Boys	Nominated
2016	Tony Award	Best Actor in a Featured Role in a Musical	Shuffle Along	Nominated
2018	Primetime Emmy Award	Primetime Emmy Award for Outstanding Actor in a Supporting Role in a Limited or Anthology Series or Movie	Jesus Christ Superstar Live in Concert	Nominated
2019	Grammy Award	Best Musical Theatre Album	Jesus Christ Superstar Live in Concert	Nominated
2024	Tony Award	Best Featured Actor in a Musical	Hell's Kitchen	Nominated
2025	Grammy Award	Best Musical Theatre Album	Hell's Kitchen	Won

†: Dixon served as a producer on these productions.

== See also ==
- African-American Tony nominees and winners
