= Beauty and the Beast: A 30th Celebration (soundtrack) =

Beauty and the Beast: A 30th Celebration (Original Soundtrack)

Soundtrack album by the cast of Beauty and the Beast: A 30th Celebration
- Released: December 16, 2022
- Genre: Pop; dance; orchestral; show tune
- Length: 37:28
- Label: Walt Disney
- Producer: Alan Menken; Howard Ashman

Beauty and the Beast: A 30th Celebration (Original Soundtrack) is the soundtrack to the 2022 ABC television special of the same name. It featured all the songs performed in the television special, which included songs from the 1991 animated film as well as one from the 2017 live-action remake. New scores for the special were also composed for the special as well. The album was released on December 16, 2022, by Walt Disney Records.

== Background ==
On July 5, 2022, a live-action/animation television special based on the 1991 film was announced with Hamish Hamilton directing. The film featured singer-songwriter H.E.R. as Belle, and Josh Groban as the Beast, with other characters, Joshua Henry, Rita Moreno, Martin Short, Shania Twain, and David Alan Grier were also featured in the film. All the characters perform renditions of the songs, including five from the original film: "Belle", "Gaston", "Be Our Guest", "Something There", "Beauty and the Beast" and "The Mob Song", while one from the 2017 film: "Evermore" was featured. "Rose Petal Suite", a score suite composed by Alan Menken for the special featuring the orchestra members and soloists were split into three pars. Part of the song "Evermore" was included in the second part of the featuring score suite. The album's pre-sales were announced on November 18, 2022, and was intended to be released on December 15, the same day as its special premiere on ABC, but was released a day later. It does not have a CD release and available only in digital formats.

== Track listing ==
All music is composed by Alan Menken.

No.	Title	Lyrics	Singer(s)	Length
1.	"Prologue"		Alan Menken	2:44
2.	"Belle"	Howard Ashman	H.E.R.; Joshua Henry; Rizwan Manji	5:19
3.	"Belle" (Reprise)	Ashman	H.E.R.	2:39
4.	"Gaston"	Ashman	Henry; Manji	3:41
5.	"Gaston" (Reprise)	Ashman	Henry; Manji	1:12
6.	"Rose Petal Suite Pt. I"		Beauty and the Beast: A 30th Celebration Orchestra	1:32
7.	"Be Our Guest"	Ashman	Martin Short; Shania Twain; David Alan Grier	3:52
8.	"Something There"	Ashman	H.E.R.; Josh Groban; Twain; Short; Grier	2:16
9.	"Beauty and the Beast"	Ashman	Twain	2:57
10.	"Evermore & Rose Petal Suite Pt. II"	Tim Rice	Groban	3:36
11.	"The Mob Song"	Ashman	Henry; Manji; H.E.R.	3:35
12.	"Rose Petal Suite Pt. III"		Orchestra	0:54
13.	"Beauty and the Beast" (Reprise)	Ashman	H.E.R.; Groban; Beauty and the Beast: A 30th Celebration Cast	3:06
Total length:				37:28

== Reception ==
Rolling Stone critic Paul Larisha added that the performance of the title track "began with the charm of any princess adaptation, H.E.R. descending down a flight of candle-lit stairs into the ballroom arm in arm with Groban while her golden yellow dress cascaded around her. But halfway through the song, as the guests twirled around in monochromatic outfits, the singer slipped away, only to emerge seconds later with her hair let down and the fluff of her dress removed to make room for her stained-glass electric guitar. The original Belle could only dream of being this cool." About the other songs, that "unsettling animations of Groban inside of an elaborate Beast costume with a chest area carved out for his head to poke through, were bolstered by the pair’s charismatic vocal performances". Laura Harley of CinemaBlend praised the creative changes of the musical numbers to honor with the legacy of the original film. Jeremy Brown praised the "amazing live performances of the songs" but had reservations on Shania Twain's rendition of the title track with Alan Menken playing the piano, feeling that Celine Dion would sing the song, but Twain stepped on to vocalise the track owing to Dion's health issues, but nevertheless praised her rendition and felt that "it was a nice tribute to the legendary Angela Lansbury who passed away earlier this year." Rob Price of Comic Watch said "The songs were beautifully sung by the new cast members with some of the original cast making cameo appearances. The musical talent of the cast really is amazing."

== Chart performance ==
Chart (2022)	Peak position
Australian Albums (ARIA)	42
UK Compilation Albums (OCC)	45
UK Digital Albums (OCC)	48
UK Soundtrack Albums (OCC)	33
US Billboard 200	183
US Soundtrack Albums (Billboard)	21
