= Kyle Scatliffe =

American actor (born 1986)

Kyle Scatliffe (born July 18, 1986) is an American stage actor best known for playing Enjolras in the 2014 Broadway revival of Les Misérables, and Harpo in the 2015 Broadway Revival of The Color Purple. He was nominated for a Laurence Olivier Award for Best Actor in a Leading Role in a Musical in 2014 for his performance as Haywood Patterson in The Scottsboro Boys.

Scatliffe has portrayed the role of the Marquis de Lafayette / Thomas Jefferson in the second U.S. tour of Hamilton, which began performances in February 2018.

== Early life and education ==
Scatliffe grew up in Westwood, New Jersey, as the youngest of five children, and attended Westwood Regional High School. Scatliffe did not have an interest in theatre until his school's drama teacher convinced him to begin performing as she saw that he had natural talent. Scatliffe performed in the high school's drama group which was named "The Woodington Players". Scatliffe's performances during high school included parts in "To Kill a Mockingbird", "City of Angels", and "Guys and Dolls". After high school, Scatliffe attended Bergen Community College in Paramus, New Jersey, and then attended the American Musical and Dramatic Academy in New York for two years.

== Acting career ==
With the recommendation from an AMDA professor, Scatliffe quickly booked his first professional part in Disney's Aida at the Coastal Carolina Arts Center. Afterwards, he appeared in regional productions of Oklahoma! and Ragtime, as well as performing in various roles on Disney Cruise Lines.

In 2012, producer Robert Christianson cast Scatliffe in A Christmas Carol: The Concert, an original adaptation of the Dickens classic tale, with music by Christianson and lyrics by Alisa Klein Hauser. Scatliffe played Marley's Ghost, the Ghosts of Christmas Past, Present and Future, and other assorted roles. Scatliffe reprised the role in HMS Media's 2013 national PBS special of the production, which was executive produced by Christianson and also starred E. Faye Butler, Michael Aaron Lindner, Scott Coulter and Arya Daire.

In 2013, Scatliffe was cast as the leading role of Haywood Patterson in the West End Production of The Scottsboro Boys. He received a Laurence Olivier Award nomination for Best Actor in a Musical for his performance. While starring in the show, producer Cameron Mackintosh saw Scatliffe's performance, and requested that he audition for the role of the failed revolutionary leader, Enjolras, in the upcoming Broadway revival of Les Misérables. Scatliffe's audition was conducted on the stage of the Queen's Theatre, which is home to the currently running West End production of Les Misérables.

He performed with the show from its opening in March 2014 to early 2015. Soon after his run in Les Misérables was completed, Scatliffe began rehearsing for the role of Harpo in the 2015 Broadway Revival of The Color Purple at the Bernard B. Jacobs Theatre. He remained with the show until its closing on January 8, 2017.

Scatliffe portrayed the role of Marquis de Lafayette / Thomas Jefferson in the second U.S. tour of Hamilton, beginning performances in February 2018.

== Theatre credits ==
Year	Production	Role	Category
2010	Aida	Mereb	Regional
2011	Dreamgirls	Marty Madison	Regional
2012	Oklahoma!	Jud Fry	Regional
2012	The 25th Annual Putnam County Spelling Bee	Mitch Mahoney	Regional
2012	Ragtime	Coalhouse Walker Jr.	Regional
2013–14	The Scottsboro Boys	Haywood Patterson	West End
2014–15	Les Misérables	Enjolras	Broadway
2015–17	The Color Purple	Harpo	Broadway
2017	Big River	Jim	Off-Broadway
2018–19	Hamilton	Marquis de Lafayette / Thomas Jefferson	Second U.S. Tour
2019	Hamilton	Marquis de Lafayette / Thomas Jefferson	Broadway (replacement)
2019–20	To Kill a Mockingbird	Tom Robinson	Broadway (replacement)
2021	Merry Wives	Mister Kwame Page	Off-Broadway
2021–23	Hamilton	Marquis de Lafayette / Thomas Jefferson	Broadway (replacement)
2023	The 12	John	Regional
2023–24	Hamilton	Marquis de Lafayette / Thomas Jefferson	Broadway (replacement)
2025–26	The Phantom of the Opera	The Phantom of the Opera	Off-Broadway

== Accolades ==
Year	Award	Category	Work	Result
2014	Laurence Olivier Award	Best Actor in a Leading Role in a Musical	The Scottsboro Boys	Nominated
