= The Scottsboro Boys (musical) =

Musical

- Broadway playbill
- Music: John Kander
- Lyrics: Fred Ebb
- Book: David Thompson
- Basis: The Scottsboro Boys Trial
- Productions: 2010 Off-Broadway; 2010 Minneapolis; 2010 Broadway; 2013 Off West End; 2014 West End; 2018 Arlington, Virginia
- Awards: Outer Critics Circle Award for Outstanding New Off-Broadway Musical, Lucille Lortel Award for Outstanding Musical, Drama Desk Award for Outstanding Lyrics

The Scottsboro Boys is a musical with a book by David Thompson, music by John Kander and lyrics by Fred Ebb. Based on the Scottsboro Boys trial, the musical is one of the last collaborations between Kander and Ebb prior to the latter's death. The musical has the framework of a minstrel show, altered to "create a musical social critique" with a company that, except for one, consists "entirely of African-American performers".

The musical debuted Off-Broadway and then moved to Broadway in 2010 for a run of only two months. It received twelve Tony Award nominations, but failed to win any. The previous record for nominations without a win was eleven, held by Steel Pier and the original production of Chicago, both also by Kander and Ebb. The musical's twelve nominations were second only to The Book of Mormon, which garnered fourteen nominations that year. Nevertheless, The Scottsboro Boys played in US regional theatres in 2012 and moved to London in 2013, where, after a sell-out production at the Young Vic, it moved to the West End in 2014.

== Synopsis ==
As she is waiting for a bus, a lady lifts a corner of a cake box she's holding. As it brings back memories, the scene around her fades away, and the minstrels arrive ("Minstrel March"). The Interlocutor, the host of the Minstrel Show, introduces the players in the troupe, including Mr. Bones and Mr. Tambo, then begins the story of the Scottsboro Boys ("Hey, Hey, Hey, Hey!").

In 1931, Haywood Patterson, one of the nine boys riding in a boxcar on a train to Memphis, is ready to see the world ("Commencing in Chattanooga"). As the train is stopped, two white girls jump out, and two policemen recognize them as prostitutes. To get away, they accuse the nearby boys of rape ("Alabama Ladies"), and the boys are sent to jail. At their trial, their lawyer is drunk and mounts no defense, and Haywood, speaking for the boys, can only respond that he has done nothing. ("Nothin'") They are found guilty and are sentenced to death at Kilby Prison. Eugene, the youngest, has nightmares ("Electric Chair"). Awaiting execution, the boys long to return home ("Go Back Home"). Just as the executions are about to begin, the verdict is overturned. In the North, the case has become a cause célèbre, and the Supreme Court has ruled the boys didn't have effective counsel. While the boys aren't free, they do get another trial ("Shout!").

A year later, they are still in prison. Haywood learns to write, and shares his short story ("Make Friends With the Truth"). The next trial gets under way in the spring of 1933. Public outrage over the trial has grown, especially in the North. They are given a New York lawyer, Samuel Leibowitz, to represent them to court ("That's Not The Way We Do Things"). During the trial, Ruby Bates, one of the girls, surprises the court and admits that the boys are innocent ("Never Too Late"). But, upon cross-examination, the Southern District Attorney makes antisemitic claims that Ruby Bates' change of heart was purchased by Leibowitz ("Financial Advice").

While the boys sit in a holding cell, waiting for the verdict, they talk about what they will do when the trial is over, believing that they can't be found guilty of crime that never happened. They talk about heading North, but the Interlocutor reminds them that they belong in the South ("Southern Days"). The boys are found guilty again and are sent back to prison. Haywood tries to escape in order to see his mother before she dies ("Commencing in Chattanooga (Reprise)"), but he's quickly caught.

As time passes, Leibowitz continues to appeal the verdict. In every trial, the boys are found guilty. Even the other girl, Victoria Price, begins to buckle ("Alabama Ladies (Reprise)"), tired of being dragged to repeated trials, but she never recants her testimony. One of the boys, Ozie Powell, is shot in the head after assaulting a guard and is left brain-damaged. By 1937, four of the youngest boys are released, but the other five remain in prison. Haywood wonders if he will ever get justice, and the Interlocutor advises him to be patient ("It's gonna take time"). Finally, Haywood is brought up for parole in front of the governor of Alabama, but will not be given parole unless he pleads guilty ("Zat So?") He defiantly refuses ("You Can't Do Me"). Haywood dies twenty-two years later in prison. As the show ends, the Interlocutor calls for the finale. The boys appear dressed in full-blown Minstrel attire and blackface, alternating between a high-energy closing number and solemnly relating how their experiences in prison left them unable to lead normal lives, leading to careers of unemployment, addiction, suicide and tragedy. The Interlocutor calls for the cakewalk, but the boys refuse, wiping off their make-up in defiance, and disappear. ("The Scottsboro Boys").

The scene fades back to the bus stop, just as the bus arrives. The lady, who is, in fact, Rosa Parks, boards the bus. The driver, who is revealed to be the Interlocutor, tells her to move to the back of the bus, but she refuses to comply.

== Background ==
In 2002, Susan Stroman first met with Thompson, Kander, and Ebb. The team began to "research the famous American trials" and found the Scottsboro Boys trial, which they thought was "a story that needed to be told." After Ebb's death in 2004, the project was put on hold. However, in 2008, Kander reapproached Stroman and Thompson, and the project continued. Kander finished writing the lyrics in Ebb's place.

== Productions ==
=== Off-Broadway, 2010 ===
The Off-Broadway production opened at the Vineyard Theatre on March 10, 2010, with previews starting on February 12, 2010. This was a limited engagement, which closed on April 18, 2010. Directed and choreographed by Susan Stroman, the original cast included John Cullum, Brandon Victor Dixon, Colman Domingo, and Sharon Washington. The creative team included sets by Beowulf Boritt, costumes by Toni-Leslie James, and lighting by Kevin Adams.

=== Minneapolis, 2010 ===
The musical opened at the Guthrie Theater, Minneapolis, Minnesota, starting July 31, 2010 and officially August 6 through September 25, with Susan Stroman as director and choreographer.

=== Broadway, 2010 ===
The musical began previews on Broadway on October 7, 2010, at the Lyceum Theatre, and officially opened on October 31, 2010, directed and choreographed by Susan Stroman. The Set Design was by Beowulf Boritt; Costume Design, Toni-Leslie James; Lighting Design, Ken Billington; Sound Design, Peter Hylenski; Orchestrations, Larry Hochman; Musical Arrangements, Glen Kelly; Music Direction and Vocal Arrangements, David Loud; Conducting, Paul Masse. This production closed on December 12, 2010, after 29 previews and 49 regular performances.

=== Regional productions ===
A Philadelphia, Pennsylvania, production of The Scottsboro Boys featuring several of the original Broadway cast members played at the Philadelphia Theatre Company in the Suzanne Roberts Theatre beginning on January 20, 2012. Stroman's original direction and choreography was replicated by Jeff Whiting. The limited engagement concluded on February 19, 2012.

A new production opened at San Diego's Old Globe Theatre on April 22, 2012, running until June 10, 2012.

The musical ran at the American Conservatory Theater, San Francisco, from June 21, 2012, to July 22, 2012.

The musical had its Los Angeles premiere on May 21, 2013 at the Ahmanson Theatre. Joshua Henry reprised his Tony nominated role of Haywood Patterson from the original Broadway cast and was joined by Hal Linden, Trent Armand Kendall, JC Montgomery, and C. Kelly Wright. The production closed on June 30, 2013.

SpeakEasy Stage produced the Boston premiere of The Scottsboro Boys in 2016. After an extended and remounted run, it won the Elliot Norton Award for Outstanding Musical Production, Midsize, Small or Fringe Theater.

The show made its Chicago premiere with Porchlight Music Theatre on February 7, 2017.

In May 2018, the musical opened at the Signature Theater in Arlington, Virginia.

Playhouse Theatre Group, Inc produced the Connecticut premiere In June 2019, at Playhouse on Park in West Hartford, Connecticut. The Hartford Courant

=== London Off-West End 2013 and West End 2014 ===
A producer of the Broadway production, Catherine Schreiber, brought The Scottsboro Boys to The Young Vic in London. The production, recreating Stroman's Broadway production, opened October 18, 2013. In January 2014 it received the Peter Hepple award for Best Musical, from The Critics' Circle. The production sold out, receiving "glowing" reviews. The show was nominated for six Olivier Awards in 2014 including Best New Musical.

The production transferred to the West End's Garrick Theatre for a limited run from October 4, 2014, to February 21, 2015. The production won Best Musical at the 2014 London Evening Standard Awards. The cast starred Brandon Victor Dixon as Haywood Patterson and featured Colman Domingo as Mr. Bones, Forrest McClendon as Mr. Tambo, James T. Lane as Ozie Powell and Julian Glover as the Interlocutor, with Music Supervision from Paul Masse. Brandon Victor Dixon was nominated in the 2015 Olivier Awards for Best Actor in a Musical.

== Characters and original casts ==
Character	Off-Broadway	Broadway	Los Angeles	Off-West End	West End
Character	2010	2010	2013		2014
Haywood Patterson	Brandon Victor Dixon	Joshua Henry	Joshua Henry	Kyle Scatliffe	Brandon Victor Dixon
Mr. Bones	Colman Domingo	Colman Domingo	Trent Armand Kendall	Colman Domingo	Colman Domingo
Mr. Tambo	Forrest McClendon	Forrest McClendon	JC Montgomery	Forrest McClendon	Forrest McClendon
Interlocutor	John Cullum	John Cullum	Hal Linden	Julian Glover	Julian Glover
Ozie Powell/Ruby Bates	Sean Bradford	James T. Lane	Gilbert L. Bailey II	James T. Lane	James T. Lane
Olen Montgomery	Josh Breckenridge	Josh Breckenridge	David Bazemore	Rohan Pinnock-Hamilton	Rohan Pinnock-Hamilton
Willie Roberson	Kendrick Jones	Kendrick Jones	Justin Prescott	Emile Ruddock	Emile Ruddock
Roy Wright	Julius Thomas III	Julius Thomas III	Clinton Roane	Clinton Roane	Joshua Da Costa
Charles Weems/Victoria Price	Christian Dante White	Christian Dante White	Christian Dante White	Christian Dante White	Dex Lee
Clarence Norris	Rodney Hicks	Rodney Hicks	Cedrick Sanders	Adebayo Bolaji	Emmanuel Kojo
Eugene Williams	Cody Ryan Wise	Jeremy Gumbs	Deandre Sevon	Idriss Kargbo	Keenan Munn-Francis
Andy Wright	Derrick Cobey	Derrick Cobey	Christopher James Culberson	Carl Spencer	Carl Spencer
The Lady	Sharon Washington	Sharon Washington	C. Kelly Wright	Dawn Hope	Dawn Hope

== Musical numbers ==
- Minstrel March – Orchestra
- Hey, Hey, Hey, Hey! – Company
- Commencing in Chattanooga – Haywood and Scottsboro Boys
- Alabama Ladies – Victoria Price and Ruby Bates
- Nothin' – Haywood
- Electric Chair – Guards, Eugene, Electrofied Charlie, and Electrofied Issac
- Go Back Home – Haywood, Eugene, and Scottsboro Boys
- Shout! – Scottsboro Boys
- Make Friends with the Truth – Haywood, Billy, and Scottsboro Boys
- That's Not the Way We Do Things – Samuel Leibowitz
- Never Too Late – Ruby Bates and Scottsboro Boys
- Financial Advice – Attorney General
- Southern Days – Scottsboro Boys
- Alabama Ladies (Reprise) – Victoria Price
- It's Gonna Take Time – Interlocutor
- Zat So – Governor of Alabama, Samuel Leibowitz, and Haywood
- You Can't Do Me – Haywood
- The Scottsboro Boys – Scottsboro Boys

The show is performed without an intermission.

== Recordings ==
An original cast recording was released by Jay Records on April 23, 2010, featuring the 2010 off-Broadway cast. The Original London Cast Recording was released on May 26, 2015. Paula Marie Black is the executive producer.

== Reception ==
The original off-Broadway production received mostly positive reviews. The New York Post's Elisabeth Vincentelli referred to it as "a masterwork, both daring and highly entertaining... Director/choreographer Susan Stroman has given it the best production possible at the intimate Vineyard Theatre. The book, score, and staging are so organically linked, you can't imagine one without the others." Steven Suskin of Variety praised the cast.

Reviews for the Broadway production were mixed (the median grade of 28 major reviews was a "B+"). While the show received mostly positive reviews, The Wall Street Journal called the show "a musical that slathers this terrible tale in a thick coat of musical-comedy frosting that has been spiked with cheap, elephantine irony. I can't imagine a nastier-tasting recipe."

The CurtainUp's reviewer wrote, "While The Scottsboro Boys has made the leap from a small downtown theater to Broadway without a stumble, the tricky question as to whether it will clear the financial hurdle of having to sell more and higher priced tickets, has yet to be answered. For all the singing and dancing, this is not a cheerful story, nor does it have sexy ladies or a romantic element. But neither is it the overly familiar standard fare geared to the tourist trade."

Ben Brantley, reviewing for The New York Times wrote, "With Scottsboro it is as if the events on which it is based are still too raw and upsetting to be treated with too much panache. Though it features some high-kicking dancing from its personable and industrious ensemble, this production gives the impression of always treading carefully, with furrowed brow, stooped shoulders and an accusatory glare."

John McWhorter of The New Republic panned the production, writing that "ideally, [this would be] a piece that grappled with the real story of the Scottsboro boys, a rich one driven by the conflicting impulses of desperate people with conflicting agendas. But the musical paints it in such broad strokes that it’s hard to engage with it on any substantial level." McWhorter concluded that "[i]f this thing were about Haymarket or Tiananmen Square we’d never have heard of it. The only reason The Scottsboro Boys has made it to the Great White Way is the Great White Guilt."

The score was generally well received by critics, with The Associated Press review saying, "Kander’s melodies are effortless, pouring out in a variety of styles from cakewalk to folk ballad to comic ditty. Ebb died in 2004, but here his clear, precise and often quite funny lyrics have been finished by Kander, and the transitions are seamless." McWhorter, however, disagreed, writing that "the Scottsboro score isn’t even much. One of John Kander and Fred Ebb’s least celebrated scores, Steel Pier, is Porgy and Bess compared to this one. Time passes for show music writers: the Scottsboro score is perhaps analogous to Cole Porter’s Aladdin or Jule Styne’s The Red Shoes. I would barely suspect Kander and Ebb had written this score if not told."

=== Controversy ===
On November 6, 2010, about thirty people gathered outside the Lyceum Theatre to protest The Scottsboro Boys, arguing that "the use of minstrelsy and blackface were racist." Stroman said she was disappointed that the protesters, who "probably had not seen the musical," had "misunderstood that the creators were not celebrating the minstrel tradition but rather using it to reveal the evils of the system." Weissler said the minstrel show is "not meant to demean or degrade anybody," but rather that it "houses the story we’re trying to tell."

Whoopi Goldberg addressed these protests on The View, saying that "there's been a lot of protests all over New York against this show – a show that people have not seen. The people who are protesting this show, 90% of the people have not seen it. ... People are protesting saying that it shouldn't be a minstrel show, this is too serious. What people don't understand is that you have to bring information to people in a most invigorating way."

== Awards and nominations ==
=== Original Off-Broadway production ===
Year	Award	Category	Nominee	Result	Ref.
2010	Drama Desk Award	Outstanding Musical		Nominated	
2010	Drama Desk Award	Outstanding Book of a Musical	David Thompson	Nominated	
2010	Drama Desk Award	Outstanding Actor in a Musical	Brandon Victor Dixon	Nominated	
2010	Drama Desk Award	Outstanding Director of a Musical	Susan Stroman	Nominated	
2010	Drama Desk Award	Outstanding Choreography	Susan Stroman	Nominated	
2010	Drama Desk Award	Outstanding Music	John Kander	Nominated	
2010	Drama Desk Award	Outstanding Lyrics	Fred Ebb	Won	
2010	Drama Desk Award	Outstanding Orchestrations	Larry Hochman	Nominated	
2010	Drama Desk Award	Outstanding Sound Design	Peter Hylenski	Nominated	
2010	Drama League Award	Outstanding Production of a Musical		Nominated	
2010	Drama League Award	Distinguished Performance	Brandon Victor Dixon	Nominated	
2010	Outer Critics Circle Award	Outstanding New Off-Broadway Musical		Won	
2010	Outer Critics Circle Award	Outstanding Actor in a Musical	Brandon Victor Dixon	Nominated	
2010	Outer Critics Circle Award	Outstanding Director of a Musical	Susan Stroman	Nominated	
2010	Outer Critics Circle Award	Outstanding Choreographer	Susan Stroman	Nominated	
2010	Outer Critics Circle Award	Outstanding New Score	John Kander	Nominated	
2010	Outer Critics Circle Award	Outstanding Lighting Design	Kevin Adams	Nominated	
2010	Lucille Lortel Award	Outstanding Musical		Won	
2010	Lucille Lortel Award	Outstanding Lead Actor	Brandon Victor Dixon	Nominated	
2010	Lucille Lortel Award	Outstanding Choreographer	Susan Stroman	Won	

=== Original Broadway production ===
Year	Award Ceremony	Category	Nominee	Result	Ref.
2011	Tony Award	Best Musical		Nominated	
2011	Tony Award	Best Book of a Musical	David Thompson	Nominated	
2011	Tony Award	Best Original Score	John Kander and Fred Ebb	Nominated	
2011	Tony Award	Best Performance by a Leading Actor in a Musical	Joshua Henry	Nominated	
2011	Tony Award	Best Performance by a Featured Actor in a Musical	Forrest McClendon	Nominated	
2011	Tony Award	Best Performance by a Featured Actor in a Musical	Colman Domingo	Nominated	
2011	Tony Award	Best Direction of a Musical	Susan Stroman	Nominated	
2011	Tony Award	Best Choreography	Susan Stroman	Nominated	
2011	Tony Award	Best Orchestrations	Larry Hochman	Nominated	
2011	Tony Award	Best Scenic Design	Beowulf Boritt	Nominated	
2011	Tony Award	Best Lighting Design	Ken Billington	Nominated	
2011	Tony Award	Best Sound Design	Peter Hylenski	Nominated	

=== Original London production ===
Year	Award Ceremony	Category	Nominee	Result	Ref.
2013	Critics' Circle Theatre Award	Best Musical		Won	
2014	Laurence Olivier Award	Best New Musical		Nominated	
2014	Laurence Olivier Award	Best Actor in a Musical	Kyle Scatliffe	Nominated	
2014	Laurence Olivier Award	Best Performance in a Supporting Role in a Musical	Colman Domingo	Nominated	
2014	Laurence Olivier Award	Best Director	Susan Stroman	Nominated	
2014	Laurence Olivier Award	Best Theatre Choreographer	Susan Stroman	Nominated	
2014	Laurence Olivier Award	Outstanding Achievement in Music	John Kander and Fred Ebb	Nominated	
2014	Evening Standard Theatre Award	Best Musical		Won	
2015	Laurence Olivier Award	Best Actor in a Musical	Brandon Victor Dixon	Nominated	
