= Beauty and the Beast: A 30th Celebration =

- Promotional poster
- Teleplay by: Ryan Landels
- Directed by: Hamish Hamilton
- Starring: H.E.R. Josh Groban; Joshua Henry; Rita Moreno; Martin Short; David Alan Grier; Shania Twain
- Composer: Alan Menken
- Country of origin: United States
- Original language: English

Production
- Executive producers: Jon M. Chu; Caitlin Foito; Hamish Hamilton; Raj Kapoor; Richard Kraft; Katy Mullan
- Producers: Rita Maye Bland; Chris Convy; H.E.R.
- Production locations: Walt Disney Studios, Burbank, California
- Cinematography: Dylan Sanford
- Editor: James Collett
- Running time: 87 minutes
- Production companies: Walt Disney Television Alternative; Done and Dusted; Electric Somewhere Co.

Original release
- Network: ABC
- Release: December 15, 2022

Beauty and the Beast: A 30th Celebration is a musical television special created for ABC, based on Disney's 1991 animated feature film Beauty and the Beast. It was produced by Jon M. Chu and directed by Hamish Hamilton. It serves as a celebration of the 30th anniversary of the animated film’s historic Oscar nomination for Best Picture. It aired on ABC on December 15, 2022, before streaming the next day on Disney+ and Hulu. Beauty and the Beast: A 30th Celebration received generally positive reviews from critics.

== Cast ==
- H.E.R. as Belle, a kindhearted bibliophilic young woman who is imprisoned by and eventually bonds with the Beast.
  - Elle Naomi as Young Belle
- Josh Groban as the Beast, a young prince who was turned into a monster by an enchantress as a result of his arrogance.
- Joshua Henry as Gaston, a self-absorbed hunter who is obsessed with Belle’s beauty and determined to have her as a trophy wife.
- Martin Short as Lumière, the Beast’s debonair first footman who was turned into a candelabra as a result of the spell.
- Shania Twain as Mrs. Potts, the motherly castle cook who was turned into a teapot as a result of the spell.
- David Alan Grier as Cogsworth, the Beast’s stuffy butler and head of household who was turned into a mantel clock as a result of the spell.
- Rizwan Manji as LeFou, Gaston’s sidekick and biggest supporter.
- Jon Jon Briones as Maurice, Belle’s loving inventor father.
- Leo Abelo Perry as Chip, Mrs Potts’ sweet-natured son who was turned into a teacup as a result of the spell.
- Charissa Kroeger as a Bimbette, one of the girls who fawn over Gaston.

Rita Moreno is the special’s Narrator. In addition, it was announced that Paige O'Hara (the original voice of Belle), Richard White (the original voice of Gaston) and composer Alan Menken would cameo as, respectively, the Bookseller, the Baker, and the piano player during "Belle".

== Production ==
=== Development ===
On July 5, 2022, ABC reported that a live-action/animation special based on the 1991 musical film Beauty and the Beast was in development, following the success of the televised musical adaptation of the 1989 animated film The Little Mermaid, entitled The Little Mermaid Live! in 2019. The special was intended to air on December 15, 2022, with Hamish Hamilton being set as director, Jon M. Chu as executive producer and Done and Dusted would produce the television special, all of them worked on The Little Mermaid Live!. ABC said that it would include live never-before-seen musical performances, with each will offer an homage to the story and add its own surprises for viewers, and also include new sets and costumes inspired by the classic story.

Chu called the film as "a game-changing experience" adding that, "when the animated movie came out, I watched it multiple times in the first weekend. It showed me the outer limits of what animated artists and storytellers could achieve, so the fact that I get to executive produce a tribute to all the creatives that made this masterpiece is a dream I didn’t even think was possible." He hailed the special as "a true celebration of creativity [...] with world-class creatives and talent to reinterpret the classic musical numbers (with a few surprises), I can’t wait for the audiences, in person and at home, to experience what we have in store for them."

The film was earlier announced under the titles Beauty and the Beast Live! and Beauty and the Beast: A 30th Anniversary Special, before the special being officially titled as Beauty and the Beast: A 30th Celebration in November 2022. It was titled, in order to honor the 30th anniversary of the original film and its historic Oscar nomination for Best Picture.

=== Casting ===
On July 20, 2022, it was reported that H.E.R. had been cast to play Belle in the special, becoming the first African-Filipino woman to play a Disney Princess on-screen. Explaining about her role in an interview on Good Morning America, she said, "I never thought I could be a Disney princess, of course every little girl wants to be a Disney princess, but I've never seen one that looks like me — so I get to be that to little girls now." Besides acting, she further served as the producer, and arranged the musical numbers with the original composer Alan Menken, which she felt it as an "amazing experience learning about so much herself."

On September 10, 2022, at the D23 Expo, the producers announced Josh Groban was cast as the Beast, along with Joshua Henry and Rita Moreno being cast as Gaston and the special's narrator, respectively. By late-September, Martin Short, Shania Twain, and David Alan Grier were cast as Lumière, Mrs. Potts, and Cogsworth, respectively, Initially, Celine Dion, who performed the titular song for the animated film with Peabo Bryson for the end credits, was approached to play Mrs. Potts, but Twain was later offered the role, due to Dion's health issues. Twain further sang the titular track with Menken, playing the song, as a tribute to Angela Lansbury (the voice of Mrs. Potts in the original film), who died in October 2022.

=== Filming ===
The special was filmed at the Disney lot in Burbank, California in November 2022. Chu called the film as "a part animation and part live action spectacle" with song and dance numbers intertwined with clips from the original version, saying that "We want to show how young dancers and choreographers can reinterpret some of the same numbers and some that were never in the animated version." Jamal Sims and Derek Hough choreographed the musical, with over 30 dancers working for the special. Hough said that the cast performed various styles, including breakdance, ballet and contemporary dance, but had to workshop ballroom dancing as "many of the cast had never danced with a partner". Raj Kapoor, who was one of the executive producers, described the camera work as "cinematic" saying that "We didn’t want the at-home audience to feel like a spectator. We wanted them to feel as if they were a guest in the television special."

=== Animation and design ===
Emmy-nominated production designer Julio Himede worked on the special, who utilized the cutting-edge technology to "celebrate the artwork of the original film through a different creative approach." Her team spent over 15 months on the design, adding a three to four month period on pre-production, and followed by the extensive set design, they inspired multiple sketches from the animators who had exclusive access to the studio's archive collections in Burbank, California and consulted Mark Henn, who worked as an animator for the original film. Several sketches were used as backdrops in the television special, to illustrate the union between the animated film and live-action production, and these were achieved using video projection and technology. Monochromatic storybook sketches appear in the song "Belle" to portray the character coming out of her house in a sketch world, and then transition from monochrome to color. Costume designer Marina Toybina designed over 400 costumes for the special.

== Soundtrack ==
The musical numbers featured in the special were released into a soundtrack on December 16, 2022 by Walt Disney Records.

== Marketing ==
The official poster for the special was released on November 10, 2022. Teaser trailers were released on November 18, 2022, showing a sneak peek at H.E.R. as Belle and Groban as the Beast.

== Reception ==
=== Critical response ===
Bria McNeal of Esquire praised the performance and vocal ability of H.E.R., calling her "simply delightful," and complimented the costume designs, writing, "This version of Beauty and the Beast (literally) rocks. Don't judge me if I watch it again." Andy Swift of TVLine said, "Twain was arguably the most unconventional casting choice for this special. (A sexy Mrs. Potts? Unheard of!) That said, she turned out to be one of the best surprises of the night," and praised the performance of H.E.R., saying, "As much as we enjoyed H.E.R.’s performance as Belle, she was never more captivating than when she returned to the stage with her guitar for the special’s big finish. We never imagined what Beauty and the Beast‘s title track would sound like on electric guitar — and now we never want it any other way."

Maureen Lee Lenker of Entertainment Weekly ranked Beauty and the Beast: A 30th Celebration 3rd in their "Every live TV musical" list, described the sets and the costumes as "truly magical," called the casting "perfect," praising the performances of H.E.R., Josh Groban, and Joshua Henry, and stated, "Each musical number was eye-poppingly wonderful, whether because of Jamal Sims' interpretive, high energy choreography or the incredible vocal prowess of the talent. Turns out the tale as old as time still has the power to delight anew, and we'll be a guest at this Disney party any time they want to invite us." Kelli Boyle of TV Insider asserted, "Anyone excited about the Wicked movies (which Chu will be directing) should see this special as an encouraging display of what Chu can do to make an old, beloved story feel both honored and new."

=== Ratings ===
In the United States, Beauty and the Beast: A 30th Celebration scored 0.79 in the key 18-49 demo, and 4.26 million viewers.

==== Streaming viewership ====
According to Whip Media's TV Time, Beauty and the Beast: A 30th Celebration was the 6th most-streamed film across all platforms in the United States during the week of December 16, 2022 to December 18, 2022.

=== Accolades ===
Year	Award	Category	Nominee(s)	Result	Ref.
2023	Costume Designers Guild Awards	Excellence in Variety, Reality-Competition, or Live Television	Marina Toybina	Nominated	
2023	Hollywood Makeup Artist and Hair Stylist Guild Awards	Best Contemporary Makeup - Television Special, One Hour or More Live Program Series	Bruce Grayson, James MacKinnon, Melanie Weaver, Angie Wells	Nominated	
2023	Hollywood Makeup Artist and Hair Stylist Guild Awards	Best Period and/or Character Makeup - Television Special, One Hour or More Live Program Series	Bruce Grayson, James MacKinnon, Tyson Fountaine, Julie Socash	Nominated	
2023	Hollywood Makeup Artist and Hair Stylist Guild Awards	Best Special Makeup Effects - Television Special, One Hour or More Live Program Series	Bruce Grayson, James MacKinnon, Alexei Dmitriew, Mo Meinhart	Nominated	
2023	Hollywood Makeup Artist and Hair Stylist Guild Awards	Best Period and/or Character Hair Styling - Television Special, One Hour or More Live Program Series	Anthony Wilson, Jennifer Guerrero, Maria Sandoval, Myo Lai	Won	
2024	Astra TV Awards	Best Actress in a Broadcast Network or Cable Limited Series or TV Movie	H.E.R.	Nominated	
2024	Astra TV Awards	Best Actor in a Broadcast Network or Cable Limited Series or TV Movie	Josh Groban	Nominated	
2024	Primetime Emmy Awards	Outstanding Choreography for Variety or Reality Programming	Jamal Sims, Phillip Chbeeb, Makenzie Dustman (for Routine: Be Our Guest)	Nominated	
2024	Primetime Emmy Awards	Outstanding Choreography for Variety or Reality Programming	Phillip Chbeeb, Makenzie Dustman (for Routine: Rose Petal Suite Pt. I)	Nominated	
2024	Primetime Emmy Awards	Outstanding Costumes for Variety, Nonfiction, or Reality Programming	Marina Toybina, Grainne O'Sullivan, Gabrielle Letamendi, Courtney Webster, Arleen Flores, Danae McQueen	Won	
2024	Primetime Emmy Awards	Outstanding Makeup for a Variety, Nonfiction or Reality Program	Bruce Grayson, James MacKinnon, Sam Fine, Julie Socash, Melanie Hughes-Weaver, Neicy Small, Alexei Dmitriew, Tyson Fountaine	Won	
