= Mo McRae =

American actor

- Occupation: Actor
- Years active: 2001–present
- Spouse: Lex Scott Davis (m. 2019)
- Children: 2

Mo McRae is an American actor, director, and producer best known for his recurring role as Tyler in the FX series Sons of Anarchy as well as Leon Hayes in the 2006 film Gridiron Gang. He starred in Fox's Pitch. In 2022, McRae directed his first film, A Lot of Nothing.

Raised in South Los Angeles, McRae turned to acting for solace. After enrolling in a drama class at Washington Preparatory High School, McRae opted to forgo his spot on the basketball team when he landed the lead in the school play.

== Career ==
After high school, McRae pursued his new-found dream as an artist in the entertainment industry. After being signed by an agent, he quickly began to book national television spots for major corporations such as Visa, Nike and Reebok, among many others. These spots opened the doors to some early primetime guest appearances on shows such as NYPD Blue, Becker and Boston Public. Other television work soon followed with appearances on CSI: Crime Scene Investigation, ER and The Shield.

In 2006, McRae was introduced to a much wider audience. He played one of the lead roles in the hit film Gridiron Gang opposite Dwayne Johnson, inhabiting the role of the troubled quarterback "Leon Hayes". The Neal H. Moritz–produced film grossed more than $40 million worldwide.

As McRae became more successful as an actor, he began to build an interest behind the camera. He produced and starred in The Fall which competed at the Cannes Film Festival in 2008. Additionally, he wrote a screenplay No Return with acclaimed movie and television writer Harry Winer. The film is currently set-up at Smash Media. He had a recurring major guest role in the FX drama Sons of Anarchy. In Season 2 of HBO's Big Little Lies he played second grade teacher Michael Perkins.

In 2010, McRae appeared in Carmen Madden's film Everyday Black Man. Also that year, McRae recurred on the ABC drama Detroit 1-8-7 as Pooch and also filmed a lead role in the indie film The Deadliest Lesson opposite Penelope Ann Miller and Yancey Arias.

McRae is the supervising producer of the 2022 CBS police procedural television series East New York.

In total, McRae has appeared in over 30 film and television projects over the past decade. He currently resides in Los Angeles.

== Personal life ==
Mo McRae married Lex Scott Davis on July 21, 2019, after less than a year of being engaged. They had an "unplugged" wedding to ensure that all of their guests were "present in the moment" as they shared personalized vows. The couple met on the set of The First Purge. They have two children, born in 2020 and 2022.

== Filmography ==
=== Film ===
Year	Title	Role	Notes
2001	The Blue Diner	Vango	
2003	Thirteen	Rapper #2	
2003	Leprechaun: Back 2 tha Hood	Shirtless Homey	Video
2004	Woman Thou Art Loosed	Scootie	
2005	Dirty	Tiptoes	
2006	Gridiron Gang	Leon Hayes	
2008	The Onion Movie	Second Bank Gunman	
2008	The Deadliest Lesson	Jason Gretch	TV movie
2008	The Fall	David	Short
2009	Dough Boys	Black	
2009	Just Another Day	Robo	
2009	Operating Instructions	James "J-40" Manners	TV movie
2010	Detention	Jason Gretch	
2010	Everyday Black Man	Yousef	
2011	CarJack	Charlie	Short
2011	The Truth About Angels	Christopher Atwell	
2012	Prodigy Bully	Donnie	TV movie
2012	Acting Like Adults	Mike	
2013	Kings and Beggars	Simon	Short
2013	The Butler	Eldridge Huggins	
2014	Wild	Jimmy Carter	
2015	November Rule	Steve	
2016	All the Way	Stokely Carmichael	TV movie
2016	Destined	Tay/Dontay	
2016	Hustle vs. Heartache	Pharoah	
2017	Aftermath	Saab	
2018	Den of Thieves	Gus Henderson	
2018	The First Purge	7 & 7	
2019	Adopt a Highway	Wilson	
2019	Gully	Otis	
2019	American Skin	-	
2020	The 24th	Walker	
2022	Rock a Bye Baby	Roshaun	Short
2022	MVP	Will Phillips	
2024	Red Right Hand	Deputy Duke Parks	

=== Television ===
Year	Title	Role	Notes
2002	NYPD Blue	Larry	Episode: "Meat Me in the Park"
2002	Boston Public	Kenny Hamilton	Episode: "Chapter Fifty"
2003	Becker	Guy	Episode: "Once Upon a Time"
2003	The District	Flick	Episode: "Back in the Saddle"
2003	Fastlane	P-Nut	Episode: "Overkill"
2003	I'm with Her	Neighbor #1	Episode: "The Weekend Away"
2003	Cold Case	Burke Kelvin	Episode: "Look Again"
2004	The Guardian	Kevin	Episode: "Blood In, Blood Out"
2004	The Shield	Derwin	Episode: "Fire in the Hole"
2004	The Division	Capone	Episode: "Hail, Hail, the Gang's All Here"
2004	CSI: Crime Scene Investigation	Leo Plummer	Episode: "No Humans Involved"
2005	ER	Kevin Hightower	Episode: "Alone in a Crowd"
2005	Cold Case	Theodore "Cartier" Clausen	Episode: "Saving Patrick Bubley"
2008	Chocolate News	Mo	Episode: "Episode #1.2"
2010	Southland	Sisqo	Episode: "The Runner"
2010	Detroit 1-8-7	Pooch	Recurring Cast
2010	The Defenders	Rapper	Episode: "Nevada v. Killa Diz"
2012	CSI: NY	Willis Frazier	Episode: "Unwrapped"
2012-14	Sons of Anarchy	Tyler Yost	Guest: Season 5-6, Recurring Cast: Season 7
2013-14	Ray Donovan	Deonte Frasier	Recurring Cast: Season 1-2
2014	Survivor's Remorse	Marcus Pierce	Episode: "In the Offing"
2015	Battle Creek	Darnell	Episode: "Man's Best Friend"
2015	Murder in the First	Anthony "Suger" Cascade	Recurring Cast: Season 2
2015-18	Empire	J Poppa	Recurring Cast: Season 2 & 4, Guest: Season 3
2016	Pitch	Blip Sanders	Main Cast
2018	This Is Us	Don Robinson	Episode: "Nine Bucks" & "Vietnam"
2019	Tales	Davis	Episode: "My Mind Playing Tricks On Me"
2019	Big Little Lies	Michael Perkins	Recurring Cast: Season 2
2019-20	Almost Family	Tim Moore	Main Cast
2020	All Rise	Kurt Beto	Episode: "Dancing at Los Angeles"
2021	Rebel	Amir	Recurring Cast
2022	The Flight Attendant	Benjamin Berry	Main Cast: Season 2
