= 2014 Laurence Olivier Awards =

Award ceremony

- Date: 13 April 2014
- Location: Royal Opera House
- Hosted by: Gemma Arterton; Stephen Mangan

Television/radio coverage
- Network: ITV

The 2014 Laurence Olivier Awards was held on Sunday 13 April 2014 at the Royal Opera House, London. The awards were presented by Gemma Arterton and Stephen Mangan. The highlights programme was presented on ITV after the ceremony.

== Winners and nominees ==
The nominations were announced on 10 March 2014 in 26 categories.

Best New Play	Best New Musical
Chimerica by Lucy Kirkwood – Almeida / Harold Pinter; 1984 by George Orwell, adapted by Robert Icke and Duncan Macmillan – Almeida; Peter and Alice by John Logan – Noël Coward; The Night Alive by Conor McPherson – Donmar Warehouse	The Book of Mormon – Prince of Wales; Charlie and the Chocolate Factory – Theatre Royal, Drury Lane; Once – Phoenix; The Scottsboro Boys – Young Vic
Best Revival	Best Musical Revival
Ghosts – Almeida / Trafalgar Studios; Othello – National Theatre Olivier; Private Lives – Gielgud; The Amen Corner – National Theatre Olivier	Merrily We Roll Along – Harold Pinter; Tell Me on a Sunday – St James / Duchess; The Sound of Music – Regent's Park Open Air
Best New Comedy	Best Entertainment and Family
Jeeves and Wooster in Perfect Nonsense by P. G. Wodehouse, adapted by David Goodale and Robert Goodale – Duke of York's; The Duck House by Dan Patterson and Colin Swash – Vaudeville; The Full Monty by Simon Beaufoy – Noël Coward; The Same Deep Water as Me by Nick Payne – Donmar Warehouse	The Wind in the Willows – Duchess; Barry Humphries' Farewell Tour: Eat, Pray, Laugh! – London Palladium; Derren Brown: Infamous – Palace; Eric and Little Ern – Vaudeville
Best Actor	Best Actress
Rory Kinnear as Iago in Othello – National Theatre Olivier; Henry Goodman as Arturo Ui in The Resistible Rise of Arturo Ui – Duchess; Tom Hiddleston as Coriolanus in Coriolanus – Donmar Warehouse; Jude Law as King Henry V in Henry V – Noël Coward	Lesley Manville as Mrs. Helene Alving in Ghosts – Almeida / Trafalgar Studios; Hayley Atwell as Sylvia in The Pride – Trafalgar Studios; Anna Chancellor as Amanda Prynne in Private Lives – Gielgud; Judi Dench as Alice Liddell in Peter and Alice – Noël Coward
Best Actor in a Musical	Best Actress in a Musical
Gavin Creel as Elder Price in The Book of Mormon – Prince of Wales; Jared Gertner as Elder Cunningham in The Book of Mormon – Prince of Wales; Douglas Hodge as Willy Wonka in Charlie and the Chocolate Factory – Theatre Royal, Drury Lane; Kyle Scatliffe as Haywood Patterson in The Scottsboro Boys – Young Vic	Zrinka Cvitešić as Girl in Once – Phoenix; Rosalie Craig as The Light Princess in The Light Princess – National Theatre Lyttelton; Jenna Russell as Mary Flynn in Merrily We Roll Along – Harold Pinter; Charlotte Wakefield as Maria von Trapp in The Sound of Music – Regent's Park Open Air
Best Actor in a Supporting Role	Best Actress in a Supporting Role
Jack Lowden as Oswald in Ghosts – Almeida / Trafalgar Studios; Ron Cook as Pistol in Henry V – Noël Coward; Mark Gatiss as Menenius in Coriolanus – Donmar Warehouse; Ardal O'Hanlon as Jim in The Weir – Donmar Warehouse / Wyndham's	Sharon D. Clarke as Odessa in The Amen Corner – National Theatre Olivier; Sarah Greene as Slippy Helen in The Cripple of Inishmaan – Noël Coward; Katherine Kingsley as Helena in A Midsummer Night's Dream – Noël Coward; Cecilia Noble as Sister Moore in The Amen Corner – National Theatre Olivier
Best Supporting Role in a Musical
Stephen Ashfield as Elder McKinley in The Book of Mormon – Prince of Wales; Colman Domingo as Mr Bones in The Scottsboro Boys – Young Vic; Josefina Gabrielle as Gussie in Merrily We Roll Along – Harold Pinter; Nigel Planer as Grandpa Joe in Charlie and the Chocolate Factory – Theatre Royal, Drury Lane
Best Director	Best Theatre Choreographer
Lyndsey Turner for Chimerica – Almeida / Harold Pinter; Richard Eyre for Ghosts – Almeida / Trafalgar Studios; Maria Friedman for Merrily We Roll Along – Harold Pinter; Susan Stroman for The Scottsboro Boys – Young Vic	Casey Nicholaw for The Book of Mormon – Prince of Wales; Peter Darling for Charlie and the Chocolate Factory – Theatre Royal, Drury Lane; Steven Hoggett for Once – Phoenix; Susan Stroman for The Scottsboro Boys – Young Vic
Best Set Design	Best Costume Design
Es Devlin for Chimerica – Almeida / Harold Pinter; Bob Crowley for Once – Phoenix; Tim Goodchild for Strangers on a Train – Gielgud; Mark Thompson for Charlie and the Chocolate Factory – Theatre Royal, Drury Lane	Mark Thompson for Charlie and the Chocolate Factory – Theatre Royal, Drury Lane; Nicky Gillibrand for The Wind in the Willows – Duchess; Soutra Gilmour for Merrily We Roll Along – Harold Pinter; Rae Smith for The Light Princess – National Theatre Lyttelton
Best Lighting Design	Best Sound Design
Tim Lutkin and Finn Ross for Chimerica – Almeida / Harold Pinter; Paul Pyant for Charlie and the Chocolate Factory – Theatre Royal, Drury Lane; Paule Constable for The Light Princess – National Theatre Lyttelton; Peter Mumford for Ghosts – Almeida / Trafalgar Studios	Carolyn Downing for Chimerica – Almeida / Harold Pinter; Gareth Owen for Merrily We Roll Along – Harold Pinter; Simon Baker for The Light Princess – National Theatre Lyttelton; Clive Goodwin for Once – Phoenix
Outstanding Achievement in Music
Martin Lowe for arranging and composing and Glen Hansard and Markéta Irglová for lyricising and scoring Once – Phoenix; Fred Ebb for lyricising and John Kander for scoring The Scottsboro Boys – Young Vic; Robert Lopez, Trey Parker and Matt Stone for lyricising, scoring and writing The Book of Mormon – Prince of Wales; The orchestra for Merrily We Roll Along – Harold Pinter
Outstanding Achievement in Dance	Best New Dance Production
Michael Hulls for lighting Ballet Boyz: The Talent – Sadler's Wells; Mark Morris' season – Sadler's Wells; Arthur Pita for choreographing Ballet Black: A Dream within a Midsummer Night's Dream – Linbury Studio, Royal Opera House; Clemmie Sveaas in Witch-Hunt – Linbury Studio, Royal Opera House	Puz/zle, Eastman – Sadler's Wells; Barbican Britten: Phaedra, Britten Sinfonia and Richard Alston Dance Company – Barbican; What's Become of You?, Compagnie 111 – Barbican
Outstanding Achievement in Opera	Best New Opera Production
English Touring Opera for its touring productions – Linbury Studio, Royal Opera House; Joyce DiDonato and Juan Diego Flórez in La donna del lago – Royal Opera House; Plácido Domingo in Nabucco – Royal Opera House	Les vêpres siciliennes – Royal Opera House; The Firework-Maker's Daughter – Linbury Studio, Royal Opera House; Wozzeck, English National Opera – London Coliseum
Outstanding Achievement in Affiliate Theatre
Handbagged – Tricycle; Cush Jumbo in Josephine and I – Bush; Fleabag – Soho; Oh, What a Lovely War – Theatre Royal, Stratford East
Audience Award
Les Misérables – Queen's; Matilda – Cambridge; The Phantom of the Opera – Her Majesty's; Wicked – Apollo Victoria
Society Special Award
Nicholas Hytner and Nick Starr; Michael White

== Productions with multiple nominations and awards ==
The following 16 productions received multiple nominations:

- 7: Charlie and the Chocolate Factory and Merrily We Roll Along
- 6: Once, The Book of Mormon and The Scottsboro Boys
- 5: Chimerica and Ghosts
- 4: The Light Princess
- 3: The Amen Corner
- 2: Coriolanus, Henry V, Othello, Peter and Alice, Private Lives, The Sound of Music and The Wind in the Willows

The following six productions received multiple awards:

- 5: Chimerica
- 4: The Book of Mormon
- 3: Ghosts
- 2: Charlie and the Chocolate Factory, Merrily We Roll Along and Once

== See also ==
- 68th Tony Awards
