= Everyday Black Man =

2010 American film

- Film poster
- Directed by: Carmen Madden
- Written by: Carmen Madden
- Produced by: Monte Schulz
- Starring: Henry Brown; Afi Ayanna; Chris Ayles; Ed Gilles III; Omari Hardwick; Daryl Harper; Corey Jackson; Mõ; Mawiyah Johnson; Emmanuel Lee
- Cinematography: Phillip Briggs
- Edited by: Judd Flemming
- Music by: Dwayne P. Wiggins
- Release date: 30 January 2010 (San Diego Black Film Festival)
- Running time: 105 mins
- Country: United States
- Language: English

Everyday Black Man is a 2010 film directed by Carmen Madden. It stars Henry Brown, C. Kelly Wright, Omari Hardwick and Tessa Thompson. It is a story about deception and a man's struggle to save his daughter.

== Background ==
This was the debut for Carmen Madden, and it picked up an award. Henry Brown's performance was noted as "Down to a T" in a review by The other view.

== Story ==
The film focuses on Moses, a local grocery store owner Moses played by Henry Brown. Moses has a past. One that was violent and one that he walked away from. He is now a dedicated community man. Moses has a daughter who has a daughter Claire (played by Tessa Thompson) who has no idea that he is her father and because of the past he has, he cannot tell her that he is her real father. He has been turned down for a loan from a bank and then becomes duped by a seemingly good man into letting his shop being used to sell drugs. The film takes another direction with Moses just being an ordinary insignificant man turning into a man who needs to take things to another level.

== Cast ==
- Ahku as Darcy's Driver
- Elynn Alonzo as Prostitute (as Karleen Griffin)
- Tessa Thompson as Claire
- Chris Ayles as William / Banker
- Henry Brown as Moses
- Crystal Bush as Nurse
- Marion Christian as Store Bodyguard
- Marjorie Crump-Shears as Mary / Grandmother (as Marjorie Shears)
- Ronald Gardner as Officer 2
- Ed Gilles III as Darcy
- Jahkahn Bayshore Gulley as Delivery Kid
- Dave Hall as Gang Member
- Omari Hardwick as Malik
- Daryl Anthony Harper as The Preacher
- Corey Jackson as Sonny
- Jermaine Steve Johnson as Young Moses
- Mawiyah Johnson as Aisha
- Emmanuel Lee as Frank
- Mo McRae as Yousef (as Mo)
- J.T. Smash as Officer 1
- Marcus D. Spencer as Moses's Driver (as Big Spence)
- Gabriela Sykes as Young Claire
- Tessa Thompson as Claire
- C. Kelly Wright as Gloria
