= Marina Toybina =

American costume and fashion designer

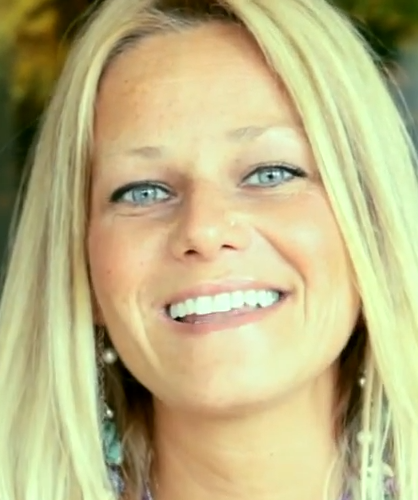
- Toybina in 2011
- Born: October 15, 1981 (age 44); Moscow, Russian SFSR, USSR
- Education: Fashion Institute of Design & Merchandising
- Occupations: Costume designer; fashion designer
- Years active: 2001–present
- Label: Glaza
- Website: marinatoybina.com

Marina Toybina (Russian: Марина Тойбина; born October 15, 1981) is an American costume and fashion designer. She has won seven Emmy Awards, including four consecutive in the Outstanding Costumes for a Variety Program or a Special category from 2012 to 2015.

== Early life and education ==
Marina Toybina was born in Moscow. At age 11, she and her family immigrated to Phoenix, Arizona, and graduated from Shadow Mountain High School in May 2000. Toybina said she designed her first piece of clothing, a purple dress, as a junior and worked at a Hallmark store to save money. She then attended the Fashion Institute of Design & Merchandising (FIDM) in Los Angeles for Fashion Design. In March 2001, Toybina's first fashion show took place at her old high school in which she designed prom dresses for students to wear.

== Career ==
While working at a clothing store, Toybina met fellow FIDM student and colleague Ashton Hirota. In 2002, they launched a fashion line, Glaza, which means "eyes" in Russian. Later that year, they put on their first fashion show which featured nearly 200 pieces. Toybina said they focused on "the creative spirit" rather than celebrity red carpet fashion. Notable clients included Mary J. Blige and members of the Black Eyed Peas. By 2004, Toybina said she had "sold most of [her] furniture and pretty much lost [her] apartment" but remained committed to fashion design.

In March 2005, Toybina became the sole owner of Glaza and relaunched the label in July 2006 with a new fashion show. In late 2007, she received more recognition after one of the pieces was worn by Britney Spears in her "Piece of Me" music video. According to Billboard, Toybina has been "booked solid" since 2010. She has designed outfits worn in the tours and music videos of Taylor Swift, Usher, Ariana Grande, Katy Perry, Nicki Minaj, Pink, Carrie Underwood, Fifth Harmony, and My Chemical Romance, among others. Toybina also created the backup dancers' costumes in the 2015 Super Bowl XLIX halftime show. She began work on television series with The X Factor and has also done so on So You Think You Can Dance, World of Dance, and The Masked Singer.

== Awards and nominations ==
Awards and nominations
Award	Year	Work	Category	Result	Ref(s)
Costume Designers Guild Awards	2019	So You Think You Can Dance	Excellence in Variety, Reality-Competition, Live Television	Nominated	
Costume Designers Guild Awards	2020	The Masked Singer	Excellence in Variety, Reality-Competition, Live Television	Won	
Primetime Creative Arts Emmy Awards	2012	The X Factor	Outstanding Costumes for a Variety Program or a Special	Won	
Primetime Creative Arts Emmy Awards	2013	55th Annual Grammy Awards	Outstanding Costumes for a Variety Program or a Special	Won	
Primetime Creative Arts Emmy Awards	2014	So You Think You Can Dance	Outstanding Costumes for a Variety Program or a Special	Won	
Primetime Creative Arts Emmy Awards	2015	Super Bowl XLIX halftime show	Outstanding Costumes for a Variety Program or a Special	Won	
Primetime Creative Arts Emmy Awards	2019	The Masked Singer	Outstanding Costumes for Variety, Nonfiction or Reality Programming	Nominated	
Primetime Creative Arts Emmy Awards	2020	The Masked Singer	Outstanding Costumes for Variety, Nonfiction or Reality Programming	Won	
Primetime Creative Arts Emmy Awards	2021	The Masked Singer	Outstanding Costumes for Variety, Nonfiction or Reality Programming	Won	
Primetime Creative Arts Emmy Awards	2023	Beauty and the Beast: A 30th Celebration	Outstanding Costumes for Variety, Nonfiction or Reality Programming	Won	
