= Henry Brown (actor) =

American actor

- Other names: Henry Brown; Jr.; Henry V. Brown
- Education: University of California, Santa Barbara
- Occupation: Actor
- Years active: 1970–present

Henry Brown is an American film, television and stage actor whose career began in the early 1970s. With over sixty credits, he has appeared in over thirty films and thirty television shows. He quite often plays policemen and law enforcement officials. He played the main role in Carmen Madden's 2010 film, Everyday Black Man.

== Education ==
In 1969, Brown came to UCSB with the intention of playing baseball. He graduated from there in 1971. One day while grabbing a quick meal, he accidentally spilt a glass of milk on Frank Silvera who happened to be a guest artist at UCSB at the time. Silvera introduced him to Dr. William R. Reardon. Brown was then recruited for the UCSB Touring Players. It was actually another guest artist Paul Winfield that introduced Brown to Stanley Kramer, and while still a student, Brown would land his first acting role in a Kramer film.

His film work includes My First Mister, Lethal Weapon 3. He has also had roles in The Man In The Glass Booth, Three the Hard Way, The Law, and Fireball Forward. On television he has had a recurring role in Baywatch Nights. He has also appeared in Pickett Fences. Brown is also a stage actor and his stage work includes playing the part of Kofi Annan in David Hare's Iraq war drama Stuff Happens which also included Keith Carradine playing Bush and Julian Sands playing Blair. Other stage work includes playing the part Billy Lee in The Ballad of Billy Lee. In addition to film, television and stage work, Brown has ventured into directing, and his directorial debut was music video “Nothing Sacred” by Mr. Way.

== Career ==
=== 1970s to 1980s ===
His earliest film work in the 1970 film, R. P. M. which was directed by Stanley Kramer. Along with Jose Brad and Frank Alesia, he played one of the students. A couple of years later, he played a wounded soldier in Marvin J Chomsky's Fireball Forward. In the Richard Donner directed, 1973, made-for-television film, Stat! he played the part of Dr. Neil Patricks. Also that year he played the part of Abe Humes in the Kojak movie, The Marcus-Nelson Murders. In 1975, Brown starred in The Man In The Glass Booth, the Arthur Hiller-directed adaptation of Robert Shaw's stage play. The following year, in 1976, he appeared in the Douglas Hickox feature, Sky Riders which starred James Coburn, Susannah York and Robert Culp. In the "End Run" episode of M*A*S*H in early 1977, Brown played Billy Tyler, a former college football star headed for the pros who loses a leg.

=== 1990s to 2000s ===
In 1992, he appeared in two episodes of Matlock, as Reggie in "The Evening News, Part 1" and "The Evening News, Part 2".

In 2005, Their Eyes Were Watching God starring Halle Berry was released. He played the part of Water Stone. He played Mr. Reid in Bill Duke's 2006 romantic comedy-drama Not Easily Broken.

He played the main role as Moses in Carmen Madden's award-winning, 2010 released film, Everyday Black Man where he plays local grocery store owner Moses. Moses has been turned down for a loan from a bank and then becomes duped by a seemingly good man into letting his shop being used to sell drugs. Brown's performance was noted as "Down to a T" in a review by The Other View.

== Stage work (partial list) ==
Stage
Title	Role #	Director	Venue	Date	Notes #
The Space Between the Stars, A new play by Bob Potter		Peter Lackner	Centre Stage Theater	Wednesday through Saturday; February 4–7 and 11–14, 2004	
Stuff Happens		Gordon Davidson	The Taper; 135 North Grand Ave, Los Angeles, CA	May 25 – July 17, 2005	
Ballad of Billy Lee (Encore Presentation)	Billy Lee	Asa Olsson	Plaza Playhouse Theater; Carpinteria, CA	Sunday Nov 18, 2012	

== Filmography ==
Film
Title	Role	Director	Year	Notes #
R. P. M.	Student	Stanley Kramer	1970	As Henry Brown Jr.
Fireball Forward	Wounded soldier	Marvin J. Chomsky	1972	As Henry Brown Jr.
The Marcus-Nelson Murders	Abe Humes	Joseph Sargent	1973	Made for television As Henry Brown Jr.
Stat!	Dr. Neil Patricks	Richard Donner	1973	Made for television
The Law	Reynaldo Williams	John Badham	1974	Made for Television
The Man in the Glass Booth	Jack	Arthur Hiller	1975	
Sky Riders	Martin	Douglas Hickox	1976	
Friendly Fire		David Greene	1979	Made for television
Lethal Weapon	Plainclothes cop	Richard Donner	1987	
Scrooged	Technicians	Richard Donner	1988	as Henry V. Brown
Do You Know the Muffin Man?	Sgt. Ernie Ronay	Gilbert Cates	1989	
Stepfather II	Dr. Joseph Danvers	Jeff Burr	1989	
Satan's Princess	Felson	Bert I. Gordon	1989	
Uncaged	Slash	Lisa Hunt	1991	
The Art of Dying	Captain	Wings Hauser	1991	
Lethal Weapon 3	Squad Member #2	Richard Donner	1992	
Hero	Hospital Guard	Stephen Frears	1992	
Black Widow Murders: The Blanche Taylor Moore Story	Officer Daniels	Alan Metzger	1993	
Sex, Love and Cold Hard Cash	Dickson	Harry Longstreet	1993	Made for Television
Slaughter of the Innocents	Stanley Moorehead	James Glickenhaus	1993	
Ring of Steel	Detective Smith	David Frost	1994	
Mixed Nuts	Police	Nora Ephron	1994	
Judicial Consent	Tony	William Bindley	1994	
Excessive Force II: Force on Force	Captain John Buchanan	Jonathan Winfrey	1995	
Don't Look Back	Doctor	Geoff Murphy	1996	Made for television
Cupid	Detective Thompson	Doug Campbell	1997	
The Price of Kissing	Jackee's Boyfriend	Vince DiPersio	1997	
Butter	Khaleed's Father	Peter Gathings Bunche	1998	
My First Mister	Jack Taylor, Salesman	Christine Lahti	2001	
Their Eyes Were Watching God	Walter Stone	Darnell Martin	2005	Made for television
Allan Quatermain and the Temple of Skulls	Engineer	Mark Atkins	2008	
Not Easily Broken	Mr. Reid	Bill Duke	2009	
Everyday Black Man	Moses	Carmen Madden	2010	
Duende:The Red Shoes	Duende Man	Tina Love	2016	
Tow	Detective Screem	Vanessa Alexander	2022	

Television shows (partial list)
Title	Episode #	Role	Director	Year	Notes #
The Bold Ones: The New Doctors	Quality of Fear	Bobby Rawlins	Richard Donner	1972	
The Streets of San Francisco	A Wrongful Death	Saunders	Don Medford	1973	
Tenafly	Joyride to Nowhere	Allan Cooper	Robert Day	1973	
Police Story	Line of Fire	Henninger	Barry Crane	1973	
Kojak	episode: "Marker to a Dead Bookie"	Omar 'Miami' Blake	Alex March	1974	As Henry V. Brown
Chase	episode: "The Game Ball"		Georg Fenady	1974	
Toma	episode: "The Street"		Jeannot Szwarc	1974	
Lucas Tanner	episode: "The Noise of a Quiet Weekend"	Phil	Leo Penn	1975	
Kojak	episode: "Money Back Guarantee"	Forbes	Daniel Haller	1975	
The Rookies	episode: "Deliver Me from Innocence"	Ralph Denker	Richard Benedict	1976	
Family	episode: "Point of Departure"	Policeman	John Erman	1976	
Delvecchio	2 episodes: "Delvecchio (series pilot) & "The Avenger"	Ron Turner	Jerry London	1976	
The Blue Knight	Upward Mobility	Cuban		1976	
The Quest	episode: "The Seminole Negro Indian Scouts"	Pompey	Irving J. Moore	1976	
M*A*S*H	episode: "End Run"	Sgt. Billy Tyler	Harry Morgan	1977	
Tales of the Unexpected	episode: "A Hand For Sonny Blue"	Eugene	Curtis Harrington	1977	
Hunter	episode: "Informant"	John Banks	James Whitmore, Jr.	1989	
Snoops	episode: "Twice Dead"	Quinn Burdette	Ivan Dixon	1989	
Monsters	episode: "Love Hurts"	Vance	Manny Coto	1989	
