= Forrest McClendon =

American actor

McClendon in 2021

Forrest McClendon is an American stage actor, singer and professor. McClendon received a Tony Award nomination for Best Featured Actor in a Musical nomination in 2011 for his portrayal of Mr. Tambo in the Broadway musical The Scottsboro Boys. The Scottsboro Boys marked McClendon's Broadway debut.

== Early life ==
McClendon was born and raised in Norwalk, Connecticut. He was raised in the Roodner Court housing projects in South Norwalk. His mother, Ruthie Mae Brown, still resides in Norwalk. He attended Nathan Hale Middle School and graduated from Norwalk High School in 1983. McClendon received his first formal singing lessons from Lewis Cisto, a teacher in the Norwalk High School music department. He also received lessons from Betty Jones, a Connecticut opera singer, and Cassandra Eaton, the music minister of Grace Baptist Church in Norwalk.

He initially studied engineering at the University of Connecticut. However, he switched majors to vocal studies, for which he obtained a bachelor's degree.

== Career ==
In 1993, McClendon appeared off-Broadway in Faith Journey. He also appeared as CC White in a 2005 Prince Music Theatre revival of Dreamgirls: The Musical in Philadelphia, Pennsylvania. He made his Broadway debut as Mr. Tambo in the 2010 musical The Scottsboro Boys, after appearing in the musical off-Broadway. The role led to McClendon's first Tony Award nomination in May 2011 for Best Featured Actor in a Musical. In 2011, McClendon performed in a regional production of Jacques Brel is Alive and Well and Living in Paris at the Two Rivers Theatre in Red Bank, New Jersey.

McClendon is a faculty member at Temple University and an adjunct associate professor at the University of Arts in Philadelphia. He is a resident of East Lampeter Township, a suburb of Lancaster, Pennsylvania, as of 2011.

McClendon is now a full-time professor for the Theatre Arts & Studies Program at Johns Hopkins University in Baltimore, MD since the 2024 closure of the University of Arts.
