= Luis Salgado =

Puerto Rican actor (born 1980)

Luis Salgado (born August 30, 1980 in Bayamón, Puerto Rico) is a Puerto Rican performer, director, choreographer, and producer. His career has led him to Broadway, film, television, and stages around the world. He served as associate director and choreographer of Cirque du Soleil's Paramour that opened April 16, 2019 at the Neue Flora theatre in Hamburg, Germany. He has worked with directors, choreographers and performers such as Andy Blankenbuehler, Jerry Mitchell, Sergio Trujillo, Lin-Manuel Miranda, Patti LuPone, Laura Benanti, Patrick Dempsey and Diego Luna.

== Personal life ==
Salgado was born in Bayamón, Puerto Rico, and raised in a nearby Vega Alta, Puerto Rico. He studied theatre in 1998 at the University of Puerto Rico. He moved to New York City in 2002, and currently resides in Manhattan with his wife and child.

== Career ==
Salgado made his Off-Broadway debut in 2003 with the musical Fame as a replacement for Enrico Rodriguez and understudy for the role of Joe Vegas. In 2004 he worked on the film Dirty Dancing: Havana Nights as the dance double for the role of Javier played by Diego Luna. In 2005 Salgado originated the role of Frankie Suarez in the musical The Mambo Kings In 2006 he starred as Bobby in the musical A Chorus Line in his return to Puerto Rico as a special guest artist. The musical featured local legends such as Braulio Castillo Jr., Angel Viera, Daniela Droz and Nashalí Enchautegui among others. Later in the production Salgado replaced Angel Viera as Paul at the Luis A. Ferré Performing Arts Center.

On February 8, 2007 Salgado opened his second Off-Broadway show with the musical In the Heights. He appeared in the film Across the Universe directed by Julie Taymor and American Gangster. Also in the same year served as assistant to associate choreographer: Central Park scene for the film Enchanted.

In 2008 Salgado transferred to Broadway as Jose, as well as Latin Assistant Choreographer in the Tony Award-winning musical In The Heights, directed by Thomas Kail, choreographed by Andy Blankenbuehler, with music and Lyrics by Lin-Manuel Miranda; book by Quiara Alegría Hudes. For In the Heights, the entire cast won a Drama Desk Award, and Salgado and the ensemble won an ACCA Award for Outstanding Broadway Chorus from Actors' Equity Association. This same year he played the role of Alejandro in the film Step Up 2: The Streets. Salgado also collaborated with Jamal Sims as Latin Assistant choreographer for the film.

In 2010 Salgado debuted at The Public Theater in a free outdoor concert staging of Paul Simon's The Capeman at the Delacorte Theater directed by Diane Paulus and choreographed by Sergio Trujillo. He also played the role of "Malik" on Broadway in the Lincoln Center musical adaptation of Pedro Almodóvar's Women on the Verge of a Nervous Breakdown with Sherie Rene Scott, Patti LuPone, Brian Stokes Mitchell and, Laura Benanti. The production was directed by Bartlett Sher and choreographed by Christopher Gattelli.

Salgado produced the "Dare to Go Beyond: The Album" for R.Evolución Latina featuring Broadway stars Corbin Bleu, Andréa Burns and Joshua Henry among others. The CD was released on December 13, 2010.

In 2014 Salgado gave life to the role of Kid Rizzo in the musical Rocky the Musical at the Winter Garden Theatre. directed by Alex Timbers; choreographed by Steven Hoggett and Kelly Devine.

In 2015 Salgado portrayed film director/choreographer Kenny Ortega in On Your Feet! a musical about the lives of Gloria and Emilio Estefan both in the pre-Broadway engagement in Chicago and the Broadway production that began previews on November 5, 2015. directed by Jerry Mitchell and choreographed by Sergio Trujillo. In 2017 Salgado returned to On Your Feet! as associate director in Utrecht, Netherlands.

Salgado has also directed, choreographed and developed new shows including Song of Solomon (Best Director), Zuccotti Park (Best Director), and Zapata The Musical at the New York Musical Theatre Festival, DC-7 The Roberto Clemente Story, Shafrika The White Girl, I'll Be Damned (Tina Award nominee for Best Choreography), Drop Outs and Serenade (HOLA Award, Best Choreography). On film and television he has choreographed the animated film Dora's Explorer Girls, and music videos for Wonka and McDonald's Latinos Are One – LR1 single Maña y Corazón.

In 2017 Salgado directed and choreographed the U.S. premiere of In the Heights at GALA Hispanic Theatre in Washington, D.C (Helen Hayes, Best Direction and Best Choreography). In the same year he co-choreographed the (ABC) remake of Dirty Dancing starring Abigail Breslin.

In 2018 Salgado directed and choreographed Ragtime at the Axelrod Performing Arts Center in Deal New Jersey.

Salgado returns from Germany to direct and choreograph a new bilingual version of Fame - The Musical it opened at Gala Hispanic Theatre on May 9, 2019. In June, the same year he directs the musical Aida by Elton John and Tim Rice at Axelrod Performing Arts Center starring American Idol's, Ace Young.

In 2011, he founded Salgado Productions, a production company committed to developing new works and creating "Art with a Purpose". The company's projects include Amigo Duende, The Musical (a musical adaptation of the classic Puerto Rican children's play), Candela Fuerza y Pasión (A New Musical Spectacular in Lima, Perú), as well as the 50th anniversary concert of Peruvian singer Cecilia Bracamonte.

Salgado is the founder and CEO of R.Evolución Latina, an organization that seeks to empower the Hispanic community through educational programming and partnerships. The organization's best-known initiatives are the Dare to Go Beyond Children's Performing Arts Camp, D2GB School Arts program and the Beyond Workshops Series, a 2-week annual professional development program for adult performers.

Salgado is a guest teacher at Broadway Dance Center and Steps on Broadway and a faculty member at Alvin Ailey. Salgado released a five-volume instructional Latin Dance DVD series for Tezoro Productions, which covers the basics of salsa, Mambo, Carnival, Merengue and Plena music.

In 2019 Salgado directed a new bilingual (LatinX) production of Fame The Musical at the GALA Theatre in Washington, D.C., which opened to rave reviews from the Washington Post, on May 9, 2019. This production won two 2020 Helen hayes awards for Outstanding Ensemble and Outstanding Production in a Musical.

In 2022 Salgado directed and choreographed the world premiere of ON YOUR FEET! La historia de Emilio y Gloria Estefan ¡EN ESPAÑOL! at GALA Hispanic Theatre in Washington, D.C. The production led the 2023 Helen Hayes Awards field with fifteen (15) Helen Hayes award nominations and nine (9) wins including Outstanding Production, Outstanding Direction, and Outstanding Choreography in a Musical.

Also in 2022, Luis directed and choreographed In The Heights at STAGES St. Louis in Missouri. The production was recognized by the St. Louis Theater Circle Awards with field-leading eleven (11) nominations and took home six (6) wins including Outstanding Production, Outstanding Ensemble, and Outstanding Choreographer in a Musical.

In total, Salgado staged eight (8) productions in 2022 including three (3) productions of In The Heights, and three (3) productions of On Your Feet! including the world premiere of the Spanish language production in Washington, D.C and in his home of Puerto Rico. He conceived, directed and choreographed Let’s Dance, a piece for Transcendence Theatre Company in California and choreographed the award-winning 2022 upfronts for Telemundo.

In 2023, Salgado is the director/choreographer of the current National Tour of On Your Feet! The Musical – The Story of Emilio & Gloria Estefan and is currently working on the upcoming production of AIDA at STAGES St. Louis.

In 2026, Salgado directed and choreographed On Your Feet! at Drury Lane Theatre in Chicago.

He is set to direct the upcoming production of 1776 at Ford's Theatre in Washington, D.C., in the 2026 season.

Following this, Salgado is developing the musical Aguardiente, which will be presented at the GALA Theatre.

== Awards and nominations ==
| Year | Award | Category | Nominated work | Result |
|---|---|---|---|---|
| 2007 | ACCA Award (Actors' Equity Association) | Outstanding Broadway Chorus | In the Heights | Won |
| 2007 | Drama Desk Award | Outstanding Ensemble Performance | In the Heights | Won |
| 2008 | HOLA Award | Outstanding Achievement in Production / Choreography | Serenade the Musical | Won |
| 2011 | Tina Award | Best Choreographer | I'll be Damned | Nominated |
| 2014 | Thespis Festival | Best Director | Song of Solomon | Won |
| 2015 | Venus/Adonis Festival | Best Director | Zuccotti Park | Won |
| 2016 | Astaire Awards | Outstanding Male Dancer in a Broadway | On Your Feet! | Nominated |
| 2018 | Helen Hayes Award | Best Direction | In the Heights | Won |
| 2018 | Helen Hayes Award | Best Choreography | In the Heights | Won |
| 2020 | Helen Hayes Award | Outstanding Choreography | FAME, The Musical | Nominated |
| 2020 | Helen Hayes Award | Outstanding Production in a Musical | FAME, The Musical | Won |
| 2023 | St. Louis Theater Circle Award | Outstanding Choreographer | In The Heights | Won |
| 2023 | Helen Hayes Award | Outstanding Director | On Your Feet! La Historia de Emilio y Gloria Estefan ¡En Español! | Won |
| 2023 | Helen Hayes Award | Outstanding Choreography | On Your Feet! La Historia de Emilio y Gloria Estefan ¡En Español! | Won |
| 2026 | Jeff Awards | Best Choreography | On Your Feet! The Story of Emilio and Gloria Estefan | Won |

Salgado has received multiple recognitions, including the BroadwayWorld.com Gypsy of the Month Award, Grand Marshall of NY Dance Parade (2009), and the recognition El Award "Hombres Destacados" by el Diario La Prensa in 2010. On Sunday, June 11, 2023, Luis will be an Ambassador for the 66th Annual National Puerto Rican Day Parade in New York City.
