= 65th Tony Awards =

2011 US theatrical awards ceremony

- Date: June 12, 2011
- Location: Beacon Theatre
- Hosted by: Neil Patrick Harris

Highlights
- Most wins: The Book of Mormon (9)
- Most nominations: The Book of Mormon (14)
- Website: tonyawards.com

Television/radio coverage
- Network: CBS
- Viewership: 6.9 million
- Produced by: Neil Patrick Harris; Ricky Kirshner; Glenn Weiss
- Directed by: Glenn Weiss

The 65th Annual Tony Awards was held on June 12, 2011, to recognize achievement in Broadway productions during the 2010–2011 season. The ceremony was held at the Beacon Theatre, ending a fourteen-year tradition of hosting the event at Radio City Music Hall. The Awards ceremony was broadcast live on CBS and was hosted by Neil Patrick Harris. The award nominations were announced on May 3, 2011.

The ceremony received highly positive reviews from critics, with many citing it as a major improvement over the previous year. Numerous critics credited host Neil Patrick Harris with the success of the production, with one critic calling him "America's next great awards host."

Neil Patrick Harris opened the show with a comedic and musical number "Broadway's Not Just for Gays Anymore". The song was written by David Javerbaum and Adam Schlesinger. Harris and Hugh Jackman performed another comic number, a revised version of "Anything You Can Do (I Can Do Better)," as rival awards-show hosts. This was Harris' second time hosting previously in 2009. He went on to host again in 2012 and 2013.

The smash hit musical The Book of Mormon was nominated for 14 Tony Awards winning 9 including the Tony Award's for Best Musical, Best Original Score, and Best Book of a Musical. The musical The Scottsboro Boys was nominated for 12 awards winning none.

== Eligibility ==
Shows that opened during the 2010–11 Broadway season before April 28, 2011, were eligible. The category of "Lead Actress in a Musical" has only four nominees. According to Tony Award rules, "Because only six actresses are eligible for nomination in the Best Performance by an Actress in a Leading Role in a Musical category, only four of those actors can be nominated."

Original plays

- Bengal Tiger at the Baghdad Zoo
- Brief Encounter
- Colin Quinn's Long Story Short
- Elling
- A Free Man of Color
- John Leguizamo's Ghetto Klown
- Good People
- High
- Jerusalem
- Lombardi
- The Motherf**ker with the Hat
- The Pee-wee Herman Show
- The Pitmen Painters
- War Horse

Original Musicals

- Baby It's You!
- Bloody Bloody Andrew Jackson
- The Book of Mormon
- Catch Me If You Can
- Elf
- The People in the Picture
- Priscilla Queen of the Desert
- Rain: A Tribute to the Beatles
- The Scottsboro Boys
- Sister Act
- Women on the Verge of a Nervous Breakdown
- Wonderland

Play Revivals

- Arcadia
- Born Yesterday
- Driving Miss Daisy
- The House of Blue Leaves
- The Importance of Being Earnest
- La Bête
- A Life in the Theatre
- The Merchant of Venice
- Mrs. Warren's Profession
- The Normal Heart
- That Championship Season

Musical Revivals

- Anything Goes
- How to Succeed in Business Without Really Trying

== Ceremony ==
In addition to the CBS television broadcast, the ceremony was simulcast live to Times Square and included the Tony Awards Red Carpet and the complete Tony Awards show, including the Creative Arts Awards.

=== Presenters ===
The creative arts awards presentation was hosted by Laura Benanti and Katie Finneran and were presented prior to the network broadcast of the rest of the awards and the entertainment. The awards in this portion of the ceremony included those for Best Original Score, Choreography, Best Orchestrations, and others.

Presenters at the ceremony included:

- Daniel Radcliffe
- Catherine Zeta-Jones
- Whoopi Goldberg
- Chris Rock
- Alec Baldwin
- Samuel L. Jackson
- Kelsey Grammer
- Viola Davis
- John Leguizamo
- Vanessa Redgrave
- James Earl Jones
- Harry Connick, Jr.
- Christie Brinkley
- David Hyde Pierce
- Marg Helgenberger
- Matthew Broderick
- Angela Lansbury
- Jim Parsons
- Robert Morse
- Joel Grey
- Patrick Wilson
- Brooke Shields
- Robin Williams

=== Hosting ===
Neil Patrick Harris, with costumed dancers and singers, opened the show with a comic and edgy number "arguing that Broadway, with its con artists, Mormons and nuns this season, is 'not just for gays anymore.'" The song was written by David Javerbaum and Adam Schlesinger. Harris and Hugh Jackman performed another comic number as rival awards-show hosts. Performances from nominated musicals included: Catch Me If You Can with Norbert Leo Butz and Aaron Tveit; Sister Act with Patina Miller; The Book of Mormon with Andrew Rannells; The Scottsboro Boys with Joshua Henry; Anything Goes with Sutton Foster; and How to Succeed in Business Without Really Trying with Daniel Radcliffe and John Laroquette. Other musical numbers were performed from Memphis, Spider-Man: Turn Off the Dark, Priscilla Queen of the Desert and Company.

Harris ended the broadcast with a rap-style recap of the show. The rap was notable because Lin-Manuel Miranda and Thomas Kail wrote the lyrics during the show—in 80 minutes while writing backstage, Miranda and Kail created all the lyrics, and Harris, aided by a teleprompter, learned and performed the rap without rehearsal.

== Special awards ==
The Tony Awards Administration Committee announced special non-competitive awards prior to the ceremony. The Tony Award for Lifetime Achievement in the Theatre is given to Athol Fugard and Philip J. Smith, Chairman of The Shubert Organization. The Isabelle Stevenson Award is awarded to Eve Ensler, founder of V-Day. The Tony Honors for Excellence in Theatre is given to animal trainer William Berloni, The Drama Book Shop (West 40th Street in Manhattan), and Sharon Jensen and Alliance for Inclusion in the Arts. The Special Tony Award is given to Handspring Puppet Company, "for creating lifelike horses (manipulated by three actor-puppeteers)". The Regional Theatre Tony Award is presented to Lookingglass Theatre Company (Chicago, Illinois).

== Competitive awards ==
Source: Tony Awards

=== Summary ===
The Book of Mormon received 14 nominations, the most of any production, and won nine, including Best Musical; The Scottsboro Boys received 12 nominations, winning none. The revival of Anything Goes won three awards, including Best Revival of a Musical. War Horse won five awards, including Best Play. The Normal Heart won three awards, including Best Revival of a Play. Several director-choreographers were double-nominated: Rob Ashford, Kathleen Marshall, Casey Nicholaw and Susan Stroman were nominated for both Best Director and Best Choreographer. Marshall (Choreography) and Nicholaw (Best Direction of a Musical with Trey Parker) won. The revival of The Merchant of Venice received seven nominations, the most for any play, but won none, followed by Jerusalem with six, winning one, for Best Actor, for the performance of Mark Rylance.

=== Awards ===
Winners are listed first and highlighted in boldface.

Best Play	Best Musical
**War Horse – Nick Stafford**; Good People – David Lindsay-Abaire; Jerusalem – Jez Butterworth; The Motherfucker with the Hat – Stephen Adly Guirgis	**The Book of Mormon**; Catch Me If You Can; The Scottsboro Boys; Sister Act
Best Revival of a Play	Best Revival of a Musical
**The Normal Heart**; Arcadia; The Importance of Being Earnest; The Merchant of Venice	**Anything Goes**; How to Succeed in Business Without Really Trying
Best Performance by a Leading Actor in a Play	Best Performance by a Leading Actress in a Play
**Mark Rylance – Jerusalem as Johnny "Rooster" Byron**; Brian Bedford – The Importance of Being Earnest as Lady Bracknell; Bobby Cannavale – The Motherfucker with the Hat as Jackie; Joe Mantello – The Normal Heart as Ned Weeks; Al Pacino – The Merchant of Venice as Shylock	**Frances McDormand – Good People as Margie Walsh**; Nina Arianda – Born Yesterday as Emma 'Billie' Dawn; Lily Rabe – The Merchant of Venice as Portia; Vanessa Redgrave – Driving Miss Daisy as Daisy Werthan; Hannah Yelland – Brief Encounter as Laura Jesson
Best Performance by a Leading Actor in a Musical	Best Performance by a Leading Actress in a Musical
**Norbert Leo Butz – Catch Me If You Can as Carl Hanratty**; Josh Gad – The Book of Mormon as Elder Cunningham; Joshua Henry – The Scottsboro Boys as Haywood Patterson; Andrew Rannells – The Book of Mormon as Elder Price; Tony Sheldon – Priscilla, Queen of the Desert as Bernadette	**Sutton Foster – Anything Goes as Reno Sweeney**; Beth Leavel – Baby It's You! as Florence Greenberg; Patina Miller – Sister Act as Deloris Van Cartier; Donna Murphy – The People in the Picture as Bubbie/Raisel
Best Performance by a Featured Actor in a Play	Best Performance by a Featured Actress in a Play
**John Benjamin Hickey – The Normal Heart as Felix Turner**; Mackenzie Crook – Jerusalem as Ginger; Billy Crudup – Arcadia as Bernard Nightingale; Arian Moayed – Bengal Tiger at the Baghdad Zoo as Musa; Yul Vázquez – The Motherfucker with the Hat as Cousin Julio	**Ellen Barkin – The Normal Heart as Dr. Emma Brookner**; Edie Falco – The House of Blue Leaves as Bananas; Judith Light – Lombardi as Marie Lombardi; Joanna Lumley – La Bête as The Princess; Elizabeth Rodriguez – The Motherfucker with the Hat as Veronica
Best Performance by a Featured Actor in a Musical	Best Performance by a Featured Actress in a Musical
**John Larroquette – How to Succeed in Business Without Really Trying as J.B. Biggley**; Colman Domingo – The Scottsboro Boys as Mr. Bones; Adam Godley – Anything Goes as Lord Evelyn Oakleigh; Forrest McClendon – The Scottsboro Boys as Mr. Tambo; Rory O'Malley – The Book of Mormon as Elder McKinley	**Nikki M. James – The Book of Mormon as Nabulungi Hatimbi**; Laura Benanti – Women on the Verge of a Nervous Breakdown as Candela; Tammy Blanchard – How to Succeed in Business Without Really Trying as Hedy La Rue; Victoria Clark – Sister Act as Mother Superior; Patti LuPone – Women on the Verge of a Nervous Breakdown as Lucia
Best Book of a Musical	Best Original Score (Music and/or Lyrics) Written for the Theatre
**Trey Parker, Robert Lopez and Matt Stone – The Book of Mormon**; Alex Timbers – Bloody Bloody Andrew Jackson; David Thompson – The Scottsboro Boys; Cheri Steinkellner, Bill Steinkellner and Douglas Carter Beane – Sister Act	**The Book of Mormon – Trey Parker, Robert Lopez and Matt Stone (music and lyrics)**; The Scottsboro Boys – John Kander and Fred Ebb (music and lyrics); Sister Act – Alan Menken (music) and Glenn Slater (lyrics); Women on the Verge of a Nervous Breakdown – David Yazbek (music and lyrics)
Best Scenic Design of a Play	Best Scenic Design of a Musical
**Rae Smith – War Horse**; Todd Rosenthal – The Motherfucker with the Hat; Ultz – Jerusalem; Mark Wendland – The Merchant of Venice	**Scott Pask – The Book of Mormon**; Beowulf Boritt – The Scottsboro Boys; Derek McLane – Anything Goes; Donyale Werle – Bloody Bloody Andrew Jackson
Best Costume Design of a Play	Best Costume Design of a Musical
**Desmond Heeley – The Importance of Being Earnest**; Jess Goldstein – The Merchant of Venice; Mark Thompson – La Bête; Catherine Zuber – Born Yesterday	**Tim Chappel and Lizzy Gardiner – Priscilla, Queen of the Desert**; Martin Pakledinaz – Anything Goes; Ann Roth – The Book of Mormon; Catherine Zuber – How to Succeed in Business Without Really Trying
Best Lighting Design of a Play	Best Lighting Design of a Musical
**Paule Constable – War Horse**; David Lander – Bengal Tiger at the Baghdad Zoo; Kenneth Posner – The Merchant of Venice; Mimi Jordan Sherin – Jerusalem	**Brian MacDevitt – The Book of Mormon**; Ken Billington – The Scottsboro Boys; Howell Binkley – How to Succeed in Business Without Really Trying; Peter Kaczorowski – Anything Goes
Best Sound Design of a Play	Best Sound Design of a Musical
**Christopher Shutt – War Horse**; Acme Sound Partners and Cricket S. Myers – Bengal Tiger at the Baghdad Zoo; Simon Baker – Brief Encounter; Ian Dickinson for Autograph – Jerusalem	**Brian Ronan – The Book of Mormon**; Peter Hylenski – The Scottsboro Boys; Steve Canyon Kennedy – Catch Me If You Can; Brian Ronan – Anything Goes
Best Direction of a Play	Best Direction of a Musical
**Marianne Elliott and Tom Morris – War Horse**; Joel Grey and George C. Wolfe – The Normal Heart; Anna D. Shapiro – The Motherfucker with the Hat; Daniel J. Sullivan – The Merchant of Venice	**Casey Nicholaw and Trey Parker – The Book of Mormon**; Rob Ashford – How to Succeed in Business Without Really Trying; Kathleen Marshall – Anything Goes; Susan Stroman – The Scottsboro Boys
Best Choreography	Best Orchestrations
**Kathleen Marshall – Anything Goes**; Rob Ashford – How to Succeed in Business Without Really Trying; Casey Nicholaw – The Book of Mormon; Susan Stroman – The Scottsboro Boys	**Larry Hochman and Stephen Oremus – The Book of Mormon**; Doug Besterman – How to Succeed in Business Without Really Trying; Larry Hochman – The Scottsboro Boys; Marc Shaiman and Larry Blank – Catch Me If You Can

== Productions with multiple nominations and awards ==
The following 21 productions received multiple nominations (the number of nominations is shown at left):

- 14: The Book of Mormon
- 12: The Scottsboro Boys
- 9: Anything Goes
- 8: How to Succeed in Business Without Really Trying
- 7: The Merchant of Venice
- 6: Jerusalem and The Motherfucker with the Hat
- 5: The Normal Heart, Sister Act and War Horse
- 4: Catch Me if You Can
- 3: Bengal Tiger at the Baghdad Zoo, The Importance of Being Earnest and Women on the Verge of a Nervous Breakdown
- 2: Arcadia, Bloody Bloody Andrew Jackson, Born Yesterday, Brief Encounter, Good People, La Bête and Priscilla, Queen of the Desert

The following four productions received multiple awards (the number is shown at left):

- 9: The Book of Mormon
- 5: War Horse
- 3: Anything Goes and The Normal Heart

== In Memoriam ==
- Arthur Laurents
- Michael Langham
- Michael Gough
- Ellen Stewart
- James Gammon
- Marcia Lewis
- Jill Clayburgh
- Sidney Michaels
- Hillard Elkins
- Betty Garrett
- Tom Bosley
- Pam Gems
- Israel Hicks
- Shannon Tavarez
- Douglas B. Leeds
- Marian Mercer
- Patricia Neal
- Arthur Penn
- Beverley Randolph
- John Willis
- Elizabeth Taylor
- Jerry Bock
- Theoni V. Aldredge
- Philip Rose
- Romulus Linney
- John Cossette
- Sandy Speer
- Sada Thompson
- Helen Stenborg
- Randall Wreghitt
- Lanford Wilson
- Joseph Stein

== See also ==
- Drama Desk Awards
- 2011 Laurence Olivier Awards – equivalent awards for West End theatre productions
- Obie Award
- New York Drama Critics' Circle
- Theatre World Award
- Lucille Lortel Awards
