= C. Kelly Wright =

American actress

- Education: University of Pittsburgh, West Virginia State University
- Occupations: Actress, singer, dancer
- Children: 2

C. Kelly Wright is an actress, singer, and dancer. She has performed in Off-Broadway musicals and plays in New York City and in television and film in the U.S. and internationally. She is known for the development of new works in theater. She appeared in the world premieres of A Little Princess and Memphis. She has worked with new works from Marcus Gardley, Katori Hall, Imani Harrington, Mike Jones, Victor Lodato, Nina Mercer, Robert O'Hara, and Venus Opal Reese. She was an AUDELCO Award nominee for Best Supporting Actress. In film she is known for her performance in Black Nativity, Angel Wishes: Journey of a Spiritual Healer, and Everyday Black Man.

== Early life ==
Wright was born in Brooklyn, New York. She studied psychology at West Virginia State University and biology at the University of Pittsburgh.

== Career ==
Wright is an actress on stage and screen. She has traveled the United States of America to perform on stage and has appeared in numerous lead roles, including as The Lady in the musical The Scottsboro Boys, a musical. She is acclaimed for her origination of the role of Felicia in the musical Memphis. Memphis was the winner of 8 Tony Awards. In Off-Broadway productions she is known for her performance in The Great Mac Daddy, and for Langston in Harlem which gave her an AUDELCO Award Nomination. Wright has been an actress, singer, and dancer in theater and film for decades. She is a member of Actors' Equity Association (AEA), and Screen Actors Guild,(SAG). She has performed in musicals, theaters, films and television. Acclaimed performances include: her role as The Lady in The Scottsboro Boys (American Conservatory Theater), as Caroline, in Caroline, or Change; as Elizabeth Keckley in A Civil War Christmas; and as Mame Wilks in Radio Golf, all of which earned her a Critic's Award for Best Female in a Play.

In 2012 she won the Critic's Circle Award for Best Featured Female in a musical for The Scottsboro Boys. In 2010, the musical won the Drama Desk Award in the category of Outstanding Lyrics by Fred Ebb.

In 2010 she starred in Black Pearl Sings, a play with music by Frank Higgins with the InterAct Theatre Company in Philadelphia, PA. Her performance was noted to be "awe-inspiring". She plays the role of Pearl a South Carolinian African American woman who is serving a prison sentence for a killing a man in 1935. While in prison she meets a musical historian who visits the prison and is collecting and recording field songs from prison inmates.

She is a member of Harlem9 which was founded in 2010. Harlem9 is a collaborative producing organization. It is based in Harlem. A group of Black theatre professionals. She is host and performs for Harlem Late Night Jazz

January 2017, C. Kelly Wright plays Bigger Thomas' mother in "Native Son". In a new adaptation by Nambi E. Kelly for the Marin Theatre Company with artistic director Jasson Minadakis. The play is based on Richard Wright's 1940's best selling novel. The novel is about poverty in the 1930s through Bigger Thomas in a poor area of Chicago's South Side.

== Filmography ==
2016 - Dark Seed, (Mrs. Montgomery), Directed and written by China L. Colston

2013 - Black Nativity, (Desperate Pawnshop Woman); Directed by Kasi Lemmons, written by Langston Hughes

2010 - Everyday Black Man, (Gloria), Directed and written by Carmen Madden

2009 - Angel Wishes: Journey of a Spiritual Healer, (Adult Lana) Based on a true story of the life of Lana Bettencourt. Written by Lana Bettencourt, screenplay by Harry Cason

2003 - The Law and Mr. Lee (TV Movie), Debra Rhames
