= Joshua Henry =

Canadian-American singer and actor

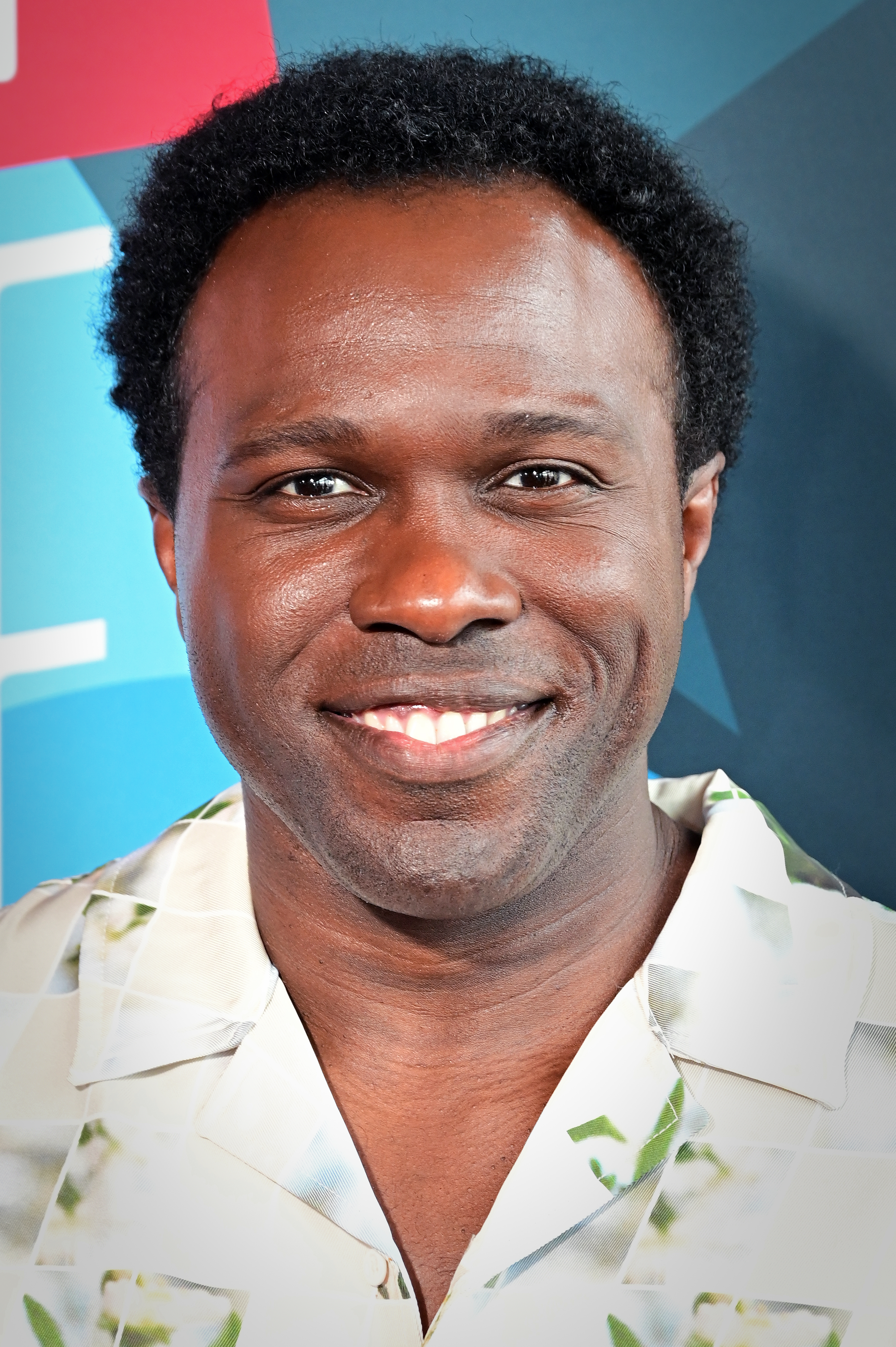
- Henry in 2026
- Born: September 2, 1984 (age 42); Winnipeg, Manitoba, Canada
- Other name: Josh Henry
- Education: University of Miami (BM)
- Occupations: Actor; singer; songwriter
- Years active: 2006–present
- Known for: Ragtime, Carousel, Hamilton, Beauty and the Beast: A 30th Celebration
- Spouse: Cathryn Stringer (m. 2012)
- Children: 3
- Awards: Tony Award winner, 4x nominee Grammy Award winner, 3x nominee Drama League Award winner 2x Drama Desk Award winner 2x Outer Critics Circle Award winner

Joshua Anthony Charlton Henry (born September 2, 1984) is a Canadian-American, Grammy and Tony Award winning actor and singer of stage and screen, known for his performances in Broadway musicals.

He is best known for starring as Coalhouse Walker Jr. in the second Broadway revival of Ragtime, which earned him a Tony Award. He also received Tony Award nominations for his roles as Haywood Patterson in The Scottsboro Boys, Flick in Violet, and Billy Bigelow in the third Broadway revival of Carousel.

Henry starred in the lead role of Aaron Burr in the first United States national tour of Hamilton, previously playing the role in the Chicago production in 2016. His other notable performances include Dr. Jim Pomatter in the Broadway restaging of Waitress, Rapunzel's Prince in the second Broadway revival of Into the Woods which earned him a Grammy Award, and Gaston in Beauty and the Beast: A 30th Celebration. He was also featured in the Broadway casts of In the Heights, American Idiot, Bring It On: The Musical, Porgy and Bess, and Shuffle Along, or, the Making of the Musical Sensation of 1921 and All That Followed.

== Early life and education ==
Henry was born in Winnipeg, Manitoba, Canada to Zadoc Henry (a teacher at Calvary Christian Academy), and raised in Miami, Florida.

His father was a Math teacher and his mother was an accountant. He has an older brother who is a bass player and an older sister who is a public health doctor. His parents are from Jamaica.

He originally wanted to be an accountant, like his mother. However, he was cast as Harold Hill in his high school (Florida Bible Christian School) production of The Music Man and with the experience he changed his mind.

Henry studied theatre at the University of Miami, where he graduated in 2006.

== Career ==
=== Theatre ===
==== 2006–2010: Early career and Broadway debut ====
Henry made his acting debut when he co-starred as Judas/John the Baptist in the Paper Mill Playhouse (Milburn, New Jersey) production of Godspell in 2006. He was set to star in a 2008 Broadway transfer opposite Gavin Creel as Jesus and Diana DeGarmo, but the project was cancelled.

In 2007, Henry appeared in the ensemble of the Off-Broadway musical In the Heights, re-joining the cast for the show's Broadway production. For In the Heights, the entire cast won a Drama Desk Award, and Henry and the ensemble won an ACCA Award for Outstanding Broadway Chorus from Actors' Equity Association.

Henry starred in Serenade, which played off-Broadway from December 9, 2007, to December 15, 2007. In June 2009, Henry contributed original music to the off-Broadway musical Shafrika, The White Girl at the Vineyard Theatre.

In 2009, he also starred in The Wiz as The Tin Man at New York City Center as a part of their Encores! series.

From March 24, 2010 to July 20, 2010 he played "Favorite Son" in the original Broadway cast of the Green Day musical American Idiot. From March 15, 2011 until the show's closing on April 24, 2011 he returned to the role of "Favorite Son" in American Idiot.

==== 2010–2011: The Scottsboro Boys and first Tony nomination ====
Henry then joined the Broadway cast of The Scottsboro Boys, directed and choreographed by Susan Stroman with a score by John Kander and Fred Ebb. He portrayed Haywood Patterson, for which he achieved critical praise. The Star Tribune wrote of his performance, "Joshua Henry ... ignites the role of Haywood Patterson as the lightning rod for our identification with the men." Charles Isherwood in The New York Times asserted that Henry "gives a performance of keen intensity as Haywood Patterson, an illiterate young man who becomes the focus of our sympathy as he steadfastly refuses to sign his name to a lie in order to obtain parole. Mr. Henry performs Haywood's ballad of hopeless yearning, 'Go Back Home,' with a powerful simplicity that slashes through the evening's artifice." Despite these positive reviews, The Scottsboro Boys closed within a month. For his performance, Henry was nominated for the 2011 Tony Award for Best Actor in a Musical, but lost to Norbert Leo Butz in Catch Me If You Can.

On January 22, he was among the performers in the Broadway Memories concert performance in New York, in which he performed selections from The Scottsboro Boys. On March 2, 2011, he performed with The Scottsboro Boys' original Broadway cast in Stro!, a gala celebration honoring Susan Stroman.

Henry attended and performed at a MCC Miscast Gala in New York, held on March 15, 2011. The performance showcases "Broadway's hottest stars performing songs from roles in which they would never be cast." On April 10, 2011, he returned to the University of Miami to perform in their Broadway Unplugged concert. In addition, Henry and the cast of The Scottsboro Boys performed in the May 16, 2011, performance of Broadway Sensation in New York City.

==== 2011–2016: Violet, concerts, and further success ====
Henry performed the role of Jake in the American Repertory Theater's production of Porgy and Bess, which began previews August 17, 2011, at the Loeb Drama Center in Cambridge, Massachusetts. It officially opened on August 31 and ran through September 30, 2011. It transferred to the Richard Rodgers Theatre on Broadway where it played from January 12 until September 23, 2012.

In May and June 2013, he reprised his Tony nominated role in The Scottsboro Boys at the Ahmanson Theatre.

Henry performed the role of Flick opposite Sutton Foster in the Roundabout Theatre production of Violet which began in April 2014. On April 29, 2014, he was nominated for a Tony in the category of Best Actor in a Featured Role in a Musical.

Henry performed in a one-night concert performance of Parade at the Lincoln Center. He starred as Jim Conley opposite Jeremy Jordan as Leo Frank, Ramin Karimloo as Tom Watson, and Laura Benanti as Lucille Frank.

He appeared in the role of Noble Sissle in the 2016 production of Shuffle Along, or, the Making of the Musical Sensation of 1921 and All That Followed at the Music Box Theatre on Broadway.

Henry starred as Jamie alongside Cynthia Erivo in a one-night benefit concert performance of Jason Robert Brown's The Last Five Years on September 12, 2016. Proceeds from the performance went to the Brady Center, a national gun violence organization.

==== 2016–present: Carousel, Tony Award win in Ragtime, and more leading roles on Broadway ====
Henry originated the roles of Hercules Mulligan, James Madison, and King George III in the 2013 Vassar College workshop of Lin-Manuel Miranda's Hamilton. In 2016 and 2017, Henry starred in the lead role of Aaron Burr in the Chicago production of Hamilton at the CIBC Theatre. He reprised the role in the first United States national tour in San Francisco and Los Angeles. On November 18, 2020, it was announced Henry would reprise his role of Burr in a special performance with the cast of Hamilton for the Macy's Thanksgiving Day Parade.

Henry gained widespread acclaim as Billy Bigelow in the 2018 Broadway revival of Rodgers and Hammerstein's Carousel, earning him another Tony Award nomination. Starring alongside Jessie Mueller, Carousel previews began February 28, officially opened April 12, and closed September 16 after 181 performances.

In 2021, Henry became the first African-American actor to play Dr. Pomatter in Waitress. He joined the Broadway cast on November 29 and stayed until it closed due to COVID-19 cases in the cast on December 20. He starred alongside Ciara Renèe as Jenna in the restaged production. He received a Broadway.com Audience Choice Award for his portrayal.

In May 2022, it was announced Henry would star as Rapunzel's Prince in the second Broadway revival of Into the Woods that would open in June of that year. He left the production on October 9 for the filming of Beauty and the Beast: A 30th Celebration and was replaced by Andy Karl. Henry returned to the production after Karl's extended run ended December 2. Henry would stay with the production until its final performance on January 8, 2023. During the run he would star opposite Gavin Creel, Cheyenne Jackson, Karl, Sara Bareilles, Brian d'Arcy James, Patina Miller, Stephanie J. Block, Montego Glover, Joaquina Kalukango, Sebastian Arcelus, Phillipa Soo, and Krysta Rodriguez.

In 2023, Henry co-wrote and co-starred in The Conversation opposite Julia Harriman at Power Station at BerkleeNYC. The production was directed by Lear DeBessonet and music directed by Alex Lacamoire. The piece is set to premiere Off-Broadway at the Astor Place Theatre beginning in November 2026 directed by Kenny Leon.

Henry starred as Coalhouse Walker Jr. in a 2024 production of Ragtime at New York City Center, opposite Caissie Levy and Brandon Uranowitz. The production opened October 30 for a two-week engagement, and Henry received rave reviews for his performance. The critical success of that production prompted a 2025 Broadway revival at the Vivian Beaumont Theatre, with Henry reprising his role and receiving many accolades most notably his first Tony Award and Drama League Award. The production is set to run from September 2025 through August 2026 after several extensions.

=== Film and television ===
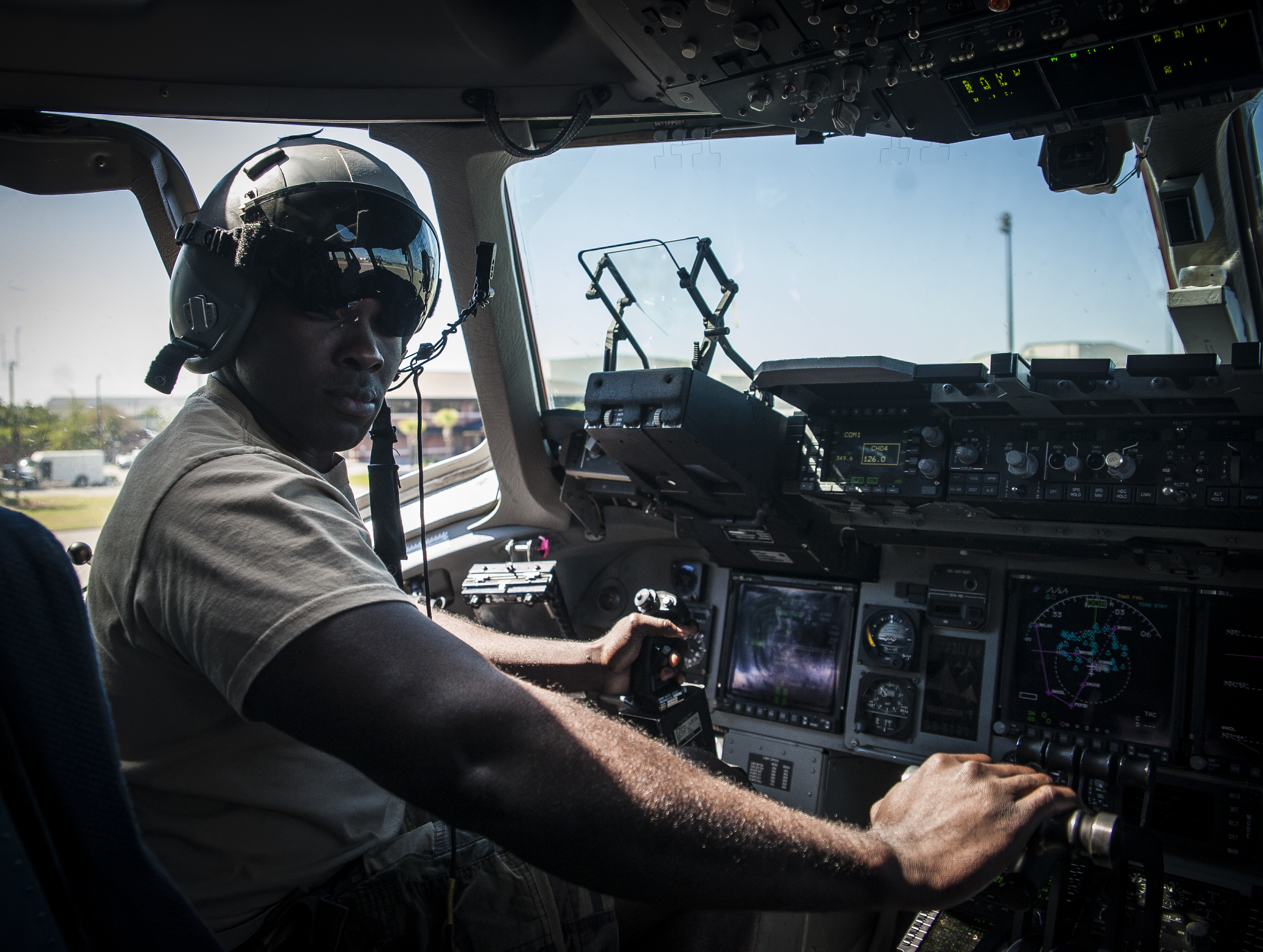
Henry in the cockpit of a C-17 Globemaster III for Army Wives in 2013

Henry appeared in the first Sex and the City film in 2008.

He appeared on the television series Kings and Nip/Tuck, as well as the 2010 short film Once Upon a Time in Australia. Henry also appeared in the role of Corporal Quincy Montclair on season 7 of the Lifetime series Army Wives.

In 2017, he starred in his biggest film role, Ben Moran in Renegades. From 2019 to 2021, he appeared in the television series See as Jerlamarel.

Henry also starred in the film adaptation of the musical tick, tick... BOOM! as Roger Bart. He starred alongside Andrew Garfield, Alexandra Shipp, Robin de Jesús, Vanessa Hudgens. It was released in November 2021. Henry received a Black Reel Award nomination for his performance.

In December 2022, Henry starred as Gaston in Beauty and the Beast: A 30th Celebration. He starred alongside H.E.R., Josh Groban, Martin Short, David Alan Grier, Shania Twain, Rizwan Manji, and Rita Moreno.

=== Music ===
On September 23, 2008, Henry performed in a concert performance titled Party Worth Crashing in New York City.

Henry, along with Corbin Bleu and Andréa Burns, was featured on "Dare to Go Beyond: The Album", by the nonprofit organization R.Evolución Latina. It was released on December 13, 2010, produced by Luis Salgado.

On January 16, 2011, Henry, Laura Osnes, and Natalie Weiss were featured performers in Kait Kerrigan and Bree Lowdermilk's You Made This Tour concert at the Laurie Beechman Theatre.

Henry performed in the 92nd Street Y's Lyrics & Lyricists event, honoring Burton Lane, on February 14, 2011.

On February 12, 2021, Henry released his EP Guarantee.

On September 10, 2021, Henry released his debut album Grow.

On December 13, 2022 Henry released his single Can't Nobody Tell Us Nothin'.

In October 2024, he appeared on Eisa Davis and Lin-Manuel Miranda's musical concept album Warriors. He sang the role of Wanya of The Bizzies.

== Personal life ==
In October 2012, he married his college sweetheart, Cathryn Stringer.

The couple announced the birth of their first child, Samson Peter Henry, in October 2018. They welcomed twin sons Max and Leo on March 21, 2021.

== Acting credits ==
=== Film ===
Year	Title	Role	Notes
2008	Sex and the City	Will	Film debut
2014	Winter's Tale	Gravesman	
2017	Renegades	Ben Moran	
2021	In the Heights	Background vocals	Film cameo
2021	tick, tick... BOOM!	Roger	
2024	A Complete Unknown	Brownie McGhee	Film cameo

=== Television ===
Year	Title	Role	Notes
2009	Kings	Soldier in Jack's Troop	Episode: "Prosperity"
2010	Nip/Tuck	Wilber	Episode: "Hiro Yoshimura"
2013	Army Wives	Quincy	9 episodes
2017	Curb Your Enthusiasm	Aaron Burr	Episode: "The Shucker"
2019–21	See	Jerlamarel	4 episodes
2022	Beauty and the Beast: A 30th Celebration	Gaston	Television special
2023	Ballmastrz: 9009	Demon Saytar (voice)	Episode: "Ballmastrz: Rubicon"

=== Theater ===
Year(s)	Production	Role	Location	Notes
2006	Godspell	Judas / John the Baptist	Paper Mill Playhouse	Regional
2007	In the Heights	Ensemble u/s Benny	37 Arts Theatre	Off-Broadway
2007	Serenade	Thomas	Teatro LATEA	Off-Broadway
2008	In the Heights	Ensemble u/s Benny	Richard Rodgers Theatre	Broadway
2009	In the Heights	Swing u/s Benny	Richard Rodgers Theatre	Broadway
2009	The Wiz	The Tin Man	New York City Center	Off-Broadway; Encores!
2009	American Idiot	Ensemble / Favorite Son	Berkeley Repertory Theatre	Regional
2010	American Idiot	Ensemble / Favorite Son	St. James Theatre	Broadway
2010	The Scottsboro Boys	Haywood Patterson	Guthrie Theater	Regional
2010	The Scottsboro Boys	Haywood Patterson	Lyceum Theatre	Broadway
2011	American Idiot	Ensemble / Favorite Son	St. James Theatre	Broadway
2011	Porgy and Bess	Jake	American Repertory Theatre	Regional
2011–2012	Porgy and Bess	Jake	Richard Rodgers Theatre	Broadway
2012	Bring It On: The Musical	"Cross the Line" Soloist	St. James Theatre	Broadway
2013	The Scottsboro Boys	Haywood Patterson	Ahmanson Theatre	Regional
2013	Violet	Flick	New York City Center	Off-Broadway; Encores!
2013	Hamilton	Hercules Mulligan / James Madison / King George III	Vassar College	Workshop
2014	Violet	Flick	American Airlines Theatre	Broadway
2015	Parade	Jim Conley	Lincoln Center	Concert
2016	Shuffle Along	Noble Sissle	Music Box Theatre	Broadway
2016	The Last Five Years	Jamie Wellerstein	The Town Hall	Brady Center Concert
2016–2017	Hamilton	Aaron Burr	CIBC Theatre	Chicago
2017	Hamilton	Aaron Burr	Orpheum Theatre	US National Tour
2017	Hamilton	Aaron Burr	Pantages Theatre	US National Tour
2018	Carousel	Billy Bigelow	Imperial Theatre	Broadway
2019	The Wrong Man	Duran	MCC Theater	Off-Broadway
2021	Waitress	Dr. Jim Pomatter	Ethel Barrymore Theatre	Broadway
2022	The Tap Dance Kid	William	NYCC Encores!	Off-Broadway
2022	Into the Woods	Rapunzel's Prince	St. James Theatre	Broadway
2022	Beauty and the Beast	Gaston	Walt Disney Studios	Television special of live production
2022–2023	Into the Woods	Rapunzel's Prince	St. James Theatre	Broadway
2023	The Conversation	He	Power Station at BerkleeNYC	Workshop; Also composer/lyricist
2024	Ragtime	Coalhouse Walker Jr.	New York City Center	Off-Broadway
2025–2026	Ragtime	Coalhouse Walker Jr.	Vivian Beaumont Theatre	Broadway
2026–2027	The Conversation	Marcus	Astor Place Theatre	Off-Broadway; Also composer/lyricist

== Awards and nominations ==
Year	Award	Category	Work	Result
2007	ACCA Award (Actors' Equity Association)	Outstanding Broadway Chorus	In the Heights	Won
2007	Drama Desk Award	Outstanding Ensemble Performance	In the Heights	Won
2011	Tony Award	Best Actor in a Musical	The Scottsboro Boys	Nominated
2014	Tony Award	Best Featured Actor in a Musical	Violet	Nominated
2014	Drama Desk Award	Outstanding Featured Actor in a Musical	Violet	Nominated
2018	Tony Award	Best Actor in a Musical	Carousel	Nominated
2018	Drama Desk Award	Outstanding Actor in a Musical	Carousel	Nominated
2018	Drama League Award	Distinguished Performance	Carousel	Nominated
2018	Outer Critics Circle Award	Outstanding Actor in a Musical	Carousel	Nominated
2019	Grammy Award	Best Musical Theater Album	Carousel	Nominated
2020	Outer Critics Circle Award	Outstanding Actor in a Musical	The Wrong Man	Won
2020	Drama Desk Award	Outstanding Actor in a Musical	The Wrong Man	Nominated
2022	Black Reel Award	Outstanding Breakthrough Performance, Male	tick, tick... BOOM!	Nominated
2022	Broadway.com Audience Choice Awards	Favorite Replacement (Male)	Waitress	Won
2023	Broadway.com Audience Choice Awards	Favorite Onstage Pair (with Gavin Creel)	Into the Woods	Nominated
2023	Grammy Award	Best Musical Theater Album	Into the Woods	Won
2026	Broadway.com Audience Choice Awards	Favorite Leading Actor in a Musical	Ragtime	Won
2026	Broadway.com Audience Choice Awards	Performance of the Year (Musical)	Ragtime	Nominated
2026	Drama League Award	Distinguished Performance	Ragtime	Won
2026	Outer Critics Circle Award	Outstanding Performer in a Broadway Musical	Ragtime	Won
2026	Drama Desk Awards	Outstanding Lead Performance in a Musical	Ragtime	Won
2026	Dorian Awards	Outstanding Lead Performance in a Broadway Musical	Ragtime	Won
2026	Tony Awards	Best Actor in a Musical	Ragtime	Won
2027	Grammy Awards	Best Musical Theater Album	Ragtime	Pending
