= Haywood Patterson =

American man wrongfully convicted of rape

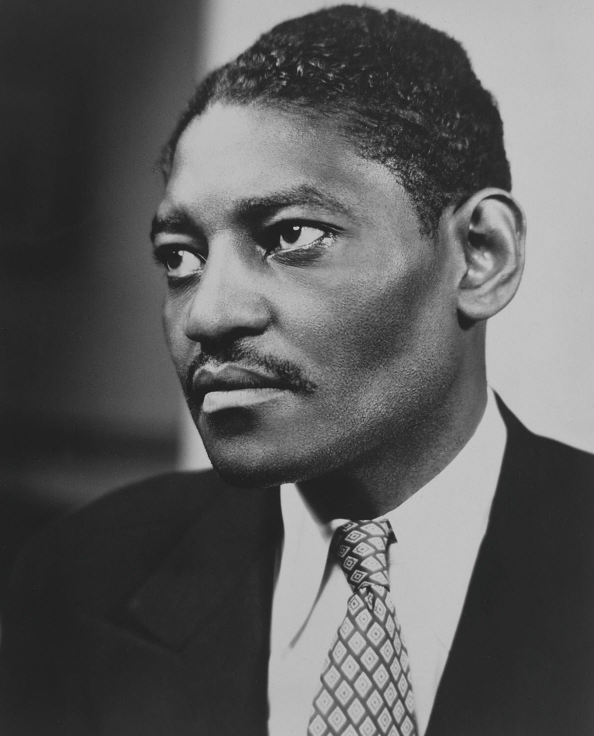
- Born: December 12, 1912; Elberton, Georgia, U.S.
- Died: August 24, 1952 (aged 39); Jackson State Prison, Jackson, Michigan, U.S.
- Known for: One of the nine members of the Scottsboro Boys

Haywood Patterson (December 12, 1912 – August 24, 1952) was an American author and one of the Scottsboro Boys. He was accused of raping Victoria Price and Ruby Bates. He wrote a book about his experience, Scottsboro Boy.

Patterson was 18 when he and eight other young black men and boys were accused of raping a white woman and a 17-year-old white girl on a train in 1931. Patterson was given the death sentence three times, but after appeals and retrials he was eventually sentenced to 75 years in prison. At his trials, Patterson falsely accused all but three of his codefendants of committing the rapes before retracting his testimony.

At Atmore Prison Farm, Patterson admitted to becoming a sexual predator to deter fellow inmates from attacking him. He kept a "gal-boy" and once attacked a fellow inmate with a knife for having sex with "his kid". Patterson once said, "I had faith in my knife. It had saved me many times." He was disliked by guards, fellow inmates, and even the other Scottsboro defendants. Clarence Norris once swore that given the chance, he would kill Patterson.

In February 1941, Patterson was stabbed 20 times, puncturing his lungs, by an inmate paid by a guard to kill him. He recovered from his injuries.

In 1948, Patterson escaped from prison and fled to Detroit. He was arrested by the FBI a few years later but was not extradited to Alabama. In December 1950, Patterson was charged with murder after he stabbed a man to death during a bar fight. After his first trial ended in a hung jury and his second trial ended in a mistrial, he was convicted of manslaughter and sentenced to six to 15 years in prison. Patterson died in Jackson State Prison of cancer in 1952, at the age of 39.

In 2013, the Alabama Board of Pardons and Paroles posthumously pardoned Patterson along with two other Scottsboro boys, Charles Weems and Andy Wright. They were the last men whose convictions had not yet been overturned or pardoned.

Joshua Henry played Patterson in the original Broadway cast of The Scottsboro Boys musical.

== Resources ==
- "Long Journey." Time Magazine Published 10 July 1950. Accessed 30 April 2008.
