= Laura Darrell =

American actress

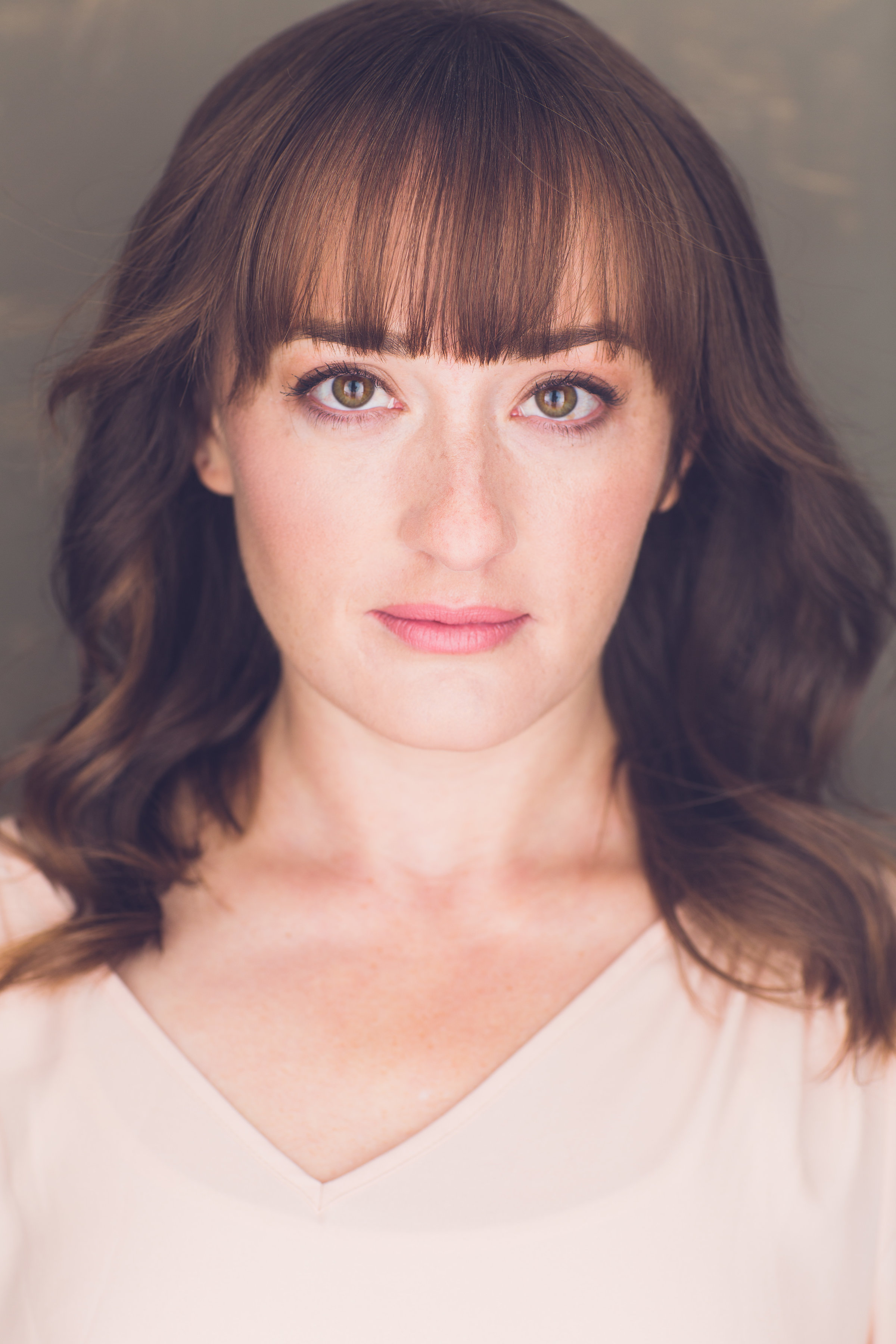
- Laura Darrell, headshot
- Education: NYU Tisch School of the Arts
- Occupations: Actress; Voice Actor
- Years active: 2010–present
- Website: www.lauradarrell.com

Laura Darrell is an American actress, singer, and audiobook narrator best known for the recurring roles of Anna in the TV series Dietland and Sister Lee in the TV series Happy!. Her film credits include Creedmoria (2016) and Boston Strangler (2023) on Hulu, in which she played Karen. In theater Laura is best known for originating the role of Suze in John Kander and Greg Pierce's Off Broadway musical Kid Victory at the Vineyard Theater and also at Signature Theatre. She also played the lead role of Anna in the Opening Cast of Frozen Live at the Hyperion, and performed at New York City Center in Encores!'s The Golden Apple directed by Michael Berresse. In 2019 Laura starred as Medium Alison in the musical Fun Home at Baltimore's Center Stage theater. In 2025, she was listed among the cast for the Signature Theatre production of Heather Christian's Oratorio for Living Things.

== Other work ==
When Laura was 13, Con Fullam of Maine Radio and Television produced a special starring her, called A Very Special Christmas for which she was nominated for a New England Emmy Award. As a teenager, Laura also provided lead vocals for A Very Wompkee Christmas produced by Deos Animation. In 2016 Darrell played Eileen in Creedmoria. Since around 2015, Laura has also been performing as a narrator of audio books, including the Pepe Novels.

== Personal ==
Darrell was born in Portland, Maine, growing up in the suburb of Yarmouth. She split her undergrad between NYU Tisch School of the Arts and USC School of Theater in Los Angeles. She also received a partial scholarship to attend BADA for a summer intensive in Shakespeare.
