= Deborah Yates =

American dancer and actress (born 1970)

- Born: June 5, 1970 (age 55); Jacksonville, Texas, United States
- Occupations: Actress, dancer
- Years active: 1994–present

Deborah Yates (born June 5, 1970) is an American dancer and actress. She was nominated for the Tony Award for Best Featured Actress in a Musical in 2000.

== Biography ==
Deborah was born and raised in Jacksonville, Texas. The daughter of Bronwyn (née Betts) and David Yates (1938–2006). Her father sold industrial supplies and her mother is a psychologist. She has two sisters, Victoria and Hillary, and a brother Brian Yates started dancing around age 6 and moved from her small hometown to Austin, Texas at age 16 to study dance. She moved back to Jacksonville for her senior year of high school. During her college career she traveled around Europe. She graduated from Southern Methodist University with a degree in Communications. Yates is a member of Mensa.

== Theatre ==
After graduating, Yates moved to Chicago and danced with the Hubbard Street Dance Company while waiting tables on the side. She gained her Equity card by performing on a cruise ship for 6 months. She moved to New York City and in 1994 joined The Rockettes. During this time she took additional singing, acting, and dances classes at Steps and The Broadway Dance Center. Yates stayed with the Rockettes for 4 years before making her Broadway debut as a swing in the 1997 revue show Dream also starring Lesley Ann Warren. The show played for 109 performances. In 2000 Yates received rave reviews and a Tony Award nomination for originating the role of 'Girl in a Yellow Dress' in the musical Contact. Ben Brantley of The New York Times referred to Yates as a razor edged Grace Kelly. Contact played 1,010 performances and won the Tony Award for Best Musical. The show was directed and choreographed by Susan Stroman and also starred Karen Ziemba and Boyd Gaines. Yates also performed the role of 'Girl in a Yellow Dress' on tour.

== Film and television ==
In 2004 Yates appeared in National Treasure as Rebecca and also appeared in the film Shall We Dance? as a dancer. She also played a supporting role in the 2002 television movie Warning: Parental Advisory as Pamela Stone. Additionally, she appeared in the 2008 film Deception as a tango dancer and had a several episode stint as Tea on As the World Turns.

== Video games ==
In 2008 Yates appeared in Grand Theft Auto IV as Sara, the random character.
