= Julie Garnyé =

American actress

Julie Garnyé is a singer, actress, voiceover artist and host.

As a performer, she most recently appeared in Los Angeles in Les Misérables at The Hollywood Bowl directed by Richard Jay-Alexander and CHESS in Concert at the Ford Amphitheatre. She also starred with Alan Cumming and Alice Ripley in Open All Night: The Music of Lance Horne and in the reading of Georgia Stitt's new musical The Water.

== Life and career ==
In New York, she recently starred in the reading of Lance Horne's new musical The $trip and, in 2007, she was distinguished as the only performer to be invited from outside New York to appear in the all-star Stephen Schwartz tribute concert at Town Hall. She is a regular performer at Cast Party at Birdland in New York and The Upright Cabaret in West Hollywood.

Other credits include Broadway: HAIR in Concert (last minute replacement for Tony Award winner Idina Menzel), CHESS in Concert, The Easter Bonnet Competition. New York: Broadway By The Year 1978 (Town Hall), Children Of Eden in Concert (New York Premiere), Pippin in Concert, NAMT Songwriters Showcase 2005 and dozens of readings and workshops. National Tours: CATS (Grizabella, Jennyanydots), Its Not Where You Start Regional: Bat Boy: The Musical, West Side Story, George M, Fiddler On The Roof, Bye Bye Birdie. Film: Tinker Bell and the Lost Treasure (DisneyToon Studios), The Little Richard Story, The Ultimate Auction. Recordings: WICKED (as Elphaba [guide vocals] Stage-Stars Karaoke), HAIR (Sh-K-Boom Records), Longing For A Place Already Gone (Laura Bell Bundys debut album), Fine and Dandy (PS Classics), Folkzinger (with Christine Lavin), Last Day On Earth (for composer Lance Horne), Wedding Plans (for composer Georgia Stitt) and Broadway By The Year 1978 Original Cast Album (to be released in 2009).

Julie has sung in concert with/for prolific composer Stephen Schwartz, pop great Neil Sedaka, singer/songwriter Josh Groban, country star Dwight Yoakam and jazz legend Dave Brubeck.

As a host, she has co-hosted on Sirius Satellite Radio with Scott Nevins (in New York and Los Angeles) and live for many charity events and concerts (also in both New York and Los Angeles).

Julie graduated from Santa Clara University with a double B.A. in Theatre and English and has been studying voice with famed vocal teacher Edward Sayegh for 15 years. She appeared as the singing voice of the fairy Lyria in the Disney animated film "Tinker Bell and the Lost Treasure", and reprised the role of Susan in the new musical "The Water" in Los Angeles in April 2009.

Garnyé's latest project is portraying Leah in the world premiere of Prelude to a Kiss, which opens at South Coast Repertory in Costa Mesa, CA. in April 2024.
