= The Opposite of Sex (musical) =

The Opposite of Sex is a musical with music and lyrics by Douglas J. Cohen and book by Cohen with Robert Jess Roth, based on the screenplay to the 1998 film of the same name by Don Roos.

== Productions ==
The show had its premiere at the Magic Theatre in San Francisco on October 2, 2004. The musical was directed by Robert Jess Roth, with the cast that featured Kerry Butler as Dedee Truitt, Karen Ziemba as Lucia, Jeff McCarthy as Carl, David Burtka as Matt and John Bolton as Bill.

The musical was produced at the Williamstown Theatre Festival, Williamstown, Massachusetts in August 2006, with Kerry Butler and David Butler reprising their roles with Gregg Edelman as Bill, Kaitlin Hopkins as Lucia and Herndon Lackey as Carl Tippett.
