= Joel Blum =

American stage actor

- Born: San Francisco, California, U.S.
- Education: College of Marin
- Occupation: Stage actor

Joel Blum is an American stage actor.

== Early life ==
Blum was born in San Francisco, California. After attending the College of Marin, he joined the national touring company of Godspell at the American Conservatory Theater in San Francisco.

== Career ==
Blum was nominated for the Tony Award for Best Featured Actor in a Musical twice. The first was in 1995 for his role as Frank in the Broadway revival of Show Boat. The second nomination was in 1997 for playing Buddy Becker in the original Broadway production of Steel Pier. He was also nominated for the 2004 Drama Desk Award for Outstanding Featured Actor in a Musical for his role in Golf: The Musical.

He appeared in the original production of 42nd Street on Broadway in 1980. Other Broadway roles include Stardust (1987), The Music Man (2000) and Debbie Reynolds On Broadway (1976). He played George in the second U.S. national tour of Billy Elliot the Musical, and Detective Marks/Man in the Off-Broadway musical Kid Victory (2017).

== Theatre credits ==
| Year | Title | Role | Notes | Ref. |
|---|---|---|---|---|
| 1976 | Debbie | Dancer | Broadway | |
| 1980 | 42nd Street | Ensemble; u/s Billy Lawlor | Broadway | |
| 1987 | Stardust | Understudy | Broadway | |
| 1991 | And the World Goes 'Round | Performer | Off-Broadway | |
| 1994 | Show Boat | Frank | Broadway | |
| 1995 | Something Wonderful | "All Er Nothin'" Performer | Broadway | |
| 1996 | Angela Lansbury - A Celebration | "Me and My Town" Dancer | Broadway | |
| 1997 | Steel Pier | Buddy Becker | Broadway | |
| 2000 | The Music Man | Marcellus Washburn | Broadway | |
| 2000 | Game Show | Gerry Smith | Off-Broadway | |
| 2003 | Golf: The Musical | Performer | Off-Broadway | |
| 2005 | After the Night and the Music | u/s Keith | Broadway | |
| 2006 | Doctor Dolittle | Performer | U.S. tour | |
| 2007 | Meet John Doe | Colonel | Regional | |
| 2010 | Billy Elliot the Musical | George | U.S. tour | |
| 2017 | Kid Victory | Performer | Off-Broadway | |
| 2018 | Neurosis | Kenny | Off-Broadway | |
| 2026 | The Mystery of Edwin Drood | Chairman | Off-Broadway | |
