= Contact (musical) =

Musical

- Opening Night Playbill cover
- Music: Various
- Lyrics: Various
- Book: John Weidman
- Productions: 1999 Off Broadway; 2000 Broadway; 2002 West End; 2003 U.S. tour
- Awards: Tony Award for Best Musical

Contact is a musical "dance play" that was developed by Susan Stroman and John Weidman, with its "book" by Weidman and both choreography and direction by Stroman. It ran both Off-Broadway and on Broadway in 1999–2002. It consists of three separate one-act dance plays.

== Productions ==
Contact premiered at the Mitzi E. Newhouse Theater, Lincoln Center, on September 9, 1999 (after 1999 workshop productions of parts of the show), then moved to Broadway at the Vivian Beaumont Theater, Lincoln Center, on March 30, 2000, and played for 1,010 performances there.

The show was received with critical acclaim and won the 2000 Tony Award for Best Musical (among others). The award was controversial because Contact contains no original music or live singing, and in response, a new award for Best Special Theatrical Event was introduced the following year.

A West End production opened at the Queen's Theatre in October 2002, and closed on May 10, 2003. The musical toured from May 2001 to June 2002, and started again in November 2002 in Toronto.

The original cast album was released on March 6, 2001. PBS included the show's final performance in its program Live from Lincoln Center on September 1, 2002. It won the Primetime Emmy Award for Outstanding Classical Music-Dance Program.

=== Regional productions ===
Among regional productions, the musical was presented by the Virginia Stage Company (Norfolk, Virginia) in April 2006. This was the first regional theater in the US to present Contact after the Broadway, national tour and London productions and was directed by Tome Cousin, an original cast member (who was chosen by Stroman to direct).

The show was produced at the North Shore Music Theatre (Beverly, Massachusetts) in June 2008, with Jarrod Emick and Naomi Hubert and directed by Tomé Cousin. In conjunction with the Sarasota Ballet, the Asolo Repertory Theatre's October 23 – November 22, 2009 at the Mertz Theatre in Sarasota, Florida starred Shannon Lewis, Feltcher McTaggart, Sean Ewing, Nadine Isenegger, Ariel Shepley, Steven Sofia, and Wilson Mendieta. Directed by Tome' Cousin

The featured SIMPLY IRRESISTIBLE section was presented February 28, 2011 during the Vineyard Theatre's Susan Stroman Gala "STRO" at the Hudson Theatre NYC. Directed / staged by Tome' Cousin

The featured SIMPLY IRRESISTIBLE section was presented numerous times by the American Dance Machine For The 21st Century at New York City's City Center and also during its Joyce Theater November 11 – 16, 2014 engagement.

=== International productions ===
The musical was produced by Mupa Budapest at the Madách Theatre in Budapest, Hungary in 2009, with choreography by Tome Cousin, and featured leading ballet dancers of the Hungarian State Opera and members of KFKI Chamber Ballet.

The show was produced in the West End at the Queen's Theatre starting on October 3, 2002 (previews) and officially on October 23. It closed on May 10, 2003.

The musical was produced in Lodz, Poland at the Opera Lodz in 2010. Directed / Choreographed by Tome' Cousin

The Musical Theater Academy of Shanghai, China presented the musical on December 19, 2014, and a revival in April 2015 Directed / Choreographed by Tome' Cousin

In 2010/2011 and again in 2017 the musical was produced in Seoul, Korea by the OD Musical Company. Both versions starred Joo Won Kim, Homin Kim, Kyoung Hoon Choi, Ji Sun Kim, Dong Ju Kang, and Sam Jin Lee. Directed by Tome' Cousin

== Background ==
According to a 1999 Playbill article, the musical was inspired by an experience that Stroman had "when she visited a dance club in the Meat Market district. There she witnessed a fascinating woman in a yellow dress who took turns dancing with different partners throughout the night. Watching from the sidelines, Stroman thought, 'she's going to change someone's life tonight.'"

Robin Pogrebin wrote in The New York Times in 1999 of Stroman visiting a swing club and noticing a dancer in a yellow dress. "The woman would step up to the dance floor as a song was beginning and nod or shake her head at the various men asking to be her partner. Then, after holding everyone's attention with her nervy grace, she would disappear into the crowd. What came out of this was Contact... "

The same origin was related in an article in The New Yorker, written by John Lahr in 2014: “'Into this sea of dark fashion stepped a girl in a yellow dress,' Stroman recalled. 'You couldn’t help but notice her: it was a very bold color to wear at night—lemon yellow—the same color you find on a traffic light. When she wanted to dance, she would step away from the bar and some man would ask her to dance.'"

== Structure, music and story ==
Contact is made up of three separate dance pieces, each set to pre-recorded music, including from Tchaikovsky, Stéphane Grappelli, the Squirrel Nut Zippers, Royal Crown Revue, and The Beach Boys. In each story, the central character expresses a longing to make a romantic connection.

All three stories concern "contact", or its lack.

- Part One – "Swinging"

"Swinging", set in an 18th-century French forest clearing, can be described as a contact improvisation on Fragonard's The Swing a print of which is displayed on an easel when the audience arrives. Sex and concealed identity are involved in this piece of amoral intrigue – a servant and his master each seeks the young lady's affection. Much of the action takes place on a moving swing.

- Part Two – "Did You Move?"

"Did You Move?", set in circa 1954 in Queens, New York, takes place in an Italian restaurant, focusing on the empty marriage of a small-time gangster and his wife. The wife has extensive dance sequences as she fantasizes about escaping her verbally abusive spouse, but each time is returned rudely to reality. Set to recorded orchestral music of Tchaikovsky and Grieg.

- Part Three – "Contact"

"Contact" is set in contemporary time, and explores the emptiness of the career-driven lives of Manhattan apartment dwellers. A lonely advertising executive on the brink of suicide is somehow transported to a bar, where he encounters a stunning woman in a yellow dress. To win her and take control of his life, he must gain the confidence to make contact with another human being.

== Musical numbers ==
Sources:Amazon.com; Internet Broadway Database

Act I
Swinging

- My Heart Stood Still (Richard Rodgers and Lorenz Hart) – Stéphane Grappelli

Did You Move?

- Anitra's Dance (Edvard Grieg) – New York Philharmonic Orchestra, cond. Leonard Bernstein
- Waltz from Eugene Onegin, Op. 24 (Pyotr Ilyich Tchaikovsky) – New York Philharmonic Orchestra, cond. Leonard Bernstein
- Farandole (Georges Bizet) – New York Philharmonic Orchestra, cond. Leonard Bernstein

Act II

- You're Nobody till Somebody Loves You – Boyd Gaines (the version in the show was performed by Dean Martin)

Contact

- Put a Lid on It – Squirrel Nut Zippers
- Sweet Lorraine – Stéphane Grappelli
- Runaround Sue – Dion DiMucci
- Beyond the Sea – Royal Crown Revue
- See What I Mean? – Al Cooper and His Savoy Sultans
- Simply Irresistible – Robert Palmer
- Do You Wanna Dance? – The Beach Boys
- Topsy – Royal Crown Revue
- Sing, Sing, Sing (Louis Prima) – Benny Goodman and His Orchestra
- Sweet Lorraine (reprise) – Stéphane Grappelli

Curtain Call

- Moondance – Van Morrison

== Casts ==
=== Original Broadway cast and replacements ===
Source: Internet Broadway Database

- Jason Antoon
- John Bolton (standby)
- Boyd Gaines
- Jack Hayes
- Robert Wersinger
- Scott Taylor
- Deborah Yates
- Karen Ziemba
- Stephanie Michels
- Seán Martin Hingston
- Mayumi Miguel
- Tome' Cousin
- Peter Gregus
- Rocker Verastique
- Nina Goldman
- Pascale Faye
- Dana Stackpole
- Shannon Hammons
- David MacGillivray
- Holly Cruikshank (standby)
- Danny Herman (swing)
- Steve Geary (swing)
- Violetta Klimczewska (replacement)
- Alan Campbell (replacement)
- Charlotte d'Amboise (replacement)
- Colleen Dunn (replacement)
- Gigi Chavoshi (replacement)
- Danny Mastrogiorgio (replacement)
- D.W. Moffett (replacement)
- Shannon Lewis (Principal standby)
- Rebecca Sherman (replacement)
- Leeanna Smith (swing)
- Angelique Ilo (swing)
- Adam Zotovitch (swing)
- Andy Blankenbuehler (replacement)
- Stacey Todd Holt (swing)
- Kelly Sullivan (swing)
- Rod McCune (swing)
- David Gomez (swing)
- Robert Armitage (swing)

Mary Ann Lamb (replacement)

=== West End cast ===
- Helen Anker
- Gavin Lee
- Michael Praed
- Sarah Wildor
- Leigh Zimmerman
- Lucy Casson
- Thom Graham

== Critical response ==
Ben Brantley, in his review in The New York Times of the production at the Newhouse, wrote: "...Stroman... aided by the dramatist John Weidman and a dream ensemble of dancing actors and acting dancers, has created the unthinkable: a new musical throbbing with wit, sex appeal and a perfectionist's polish. Brimming with a sophistication that is untainted by the usual fin-de-siecle cynicism, Contact restores the pleasure principle to the American musical. It's the kinetic equivalent of Rodgers and Hart."

== Awards and nominations ==
=== Original Broadway production ===
Year	Award ceremony	Category	Nominee	Result
2000	Tony Award	Best Musical		Won
2000	Tony Award	Best Book of a Musical	John Weidman	Nominated
2000	Tony Award	Best Performance by Featured Actor in a Musical	Boyd Gaines	Won
2000	Tony Award	Best Performance by a Featured Actress in a Musical	Karen Ziemba	Won
2000	Tony Award	Best Performance by a Featured Actress in a Musical	Deborah Yates	Nominated
2000	Tony Award	Best Direction of a Musical	Susan Stroman	Nominated
2000	Tony Award	Best Choreography	Susan Stroman	Won
2000	Drama Desk Award	Outstanding Musical		Won
2000	Drama Desk Award	Outstanding Actor in a Musical	Boyd Gaines	Nominated
2000	Drama Desk Award	Outstanding Featured Actor in a Musical	Jason Antoon	Nominated
2000	Drama Desk Award	Outstanding Featured Actress in a Musical	Karen Ziemba	Won
2000	Drama Desk Award	Outstanding Director of a Musical	Susan Stroman	Nominated
2000	Drama Desk Award	Outstanding Choreography	Susan Stroman	Won
2000	Drama Desk Award	Outstanding Scenic Design of a Musical	Thomas Lynch	Nominated
2000	Drama Desk Award	Outstanding Lighting Design	Peter Kaczorowski	Won
2000	Outer Critics Circle Award	Outstanding New Broadway Musical		Won
2000	Outer Critics Circle Award	Outstanding Featured Actor in a Musical	Boyd Gaines	Nominated
2000	Outer Critics Circle Award	Outstanding Featured Actress in a Musical	Karen Ziemba	Won
2000	Outer Critics Circle Award	Outstanding Featured Actress in a Musical	Deborah Yates	Nominated
2000	Outer Critics Circle Award	Outstanding Director of a Musical	Susan Stroman	Won
2000	Outer Critics Circle Award	Outstanding Choreography	Susan Stroman	Won
2000	Outer Critics Circle Award	Outstanding Lighting Design	Peter Kaczorowski	Won
2000	Drama League Award	Outstanding New Broadway Musical		Won
2000	Drama League Award	Distinguished Production of a Musical		Won
2000	New York Drama Critics' Circle Award	Best Musical	John Weidman	Runner-up

== See also ==
- Contact improvisation
