= John Kander =

American musical theatre composer (born 1927)

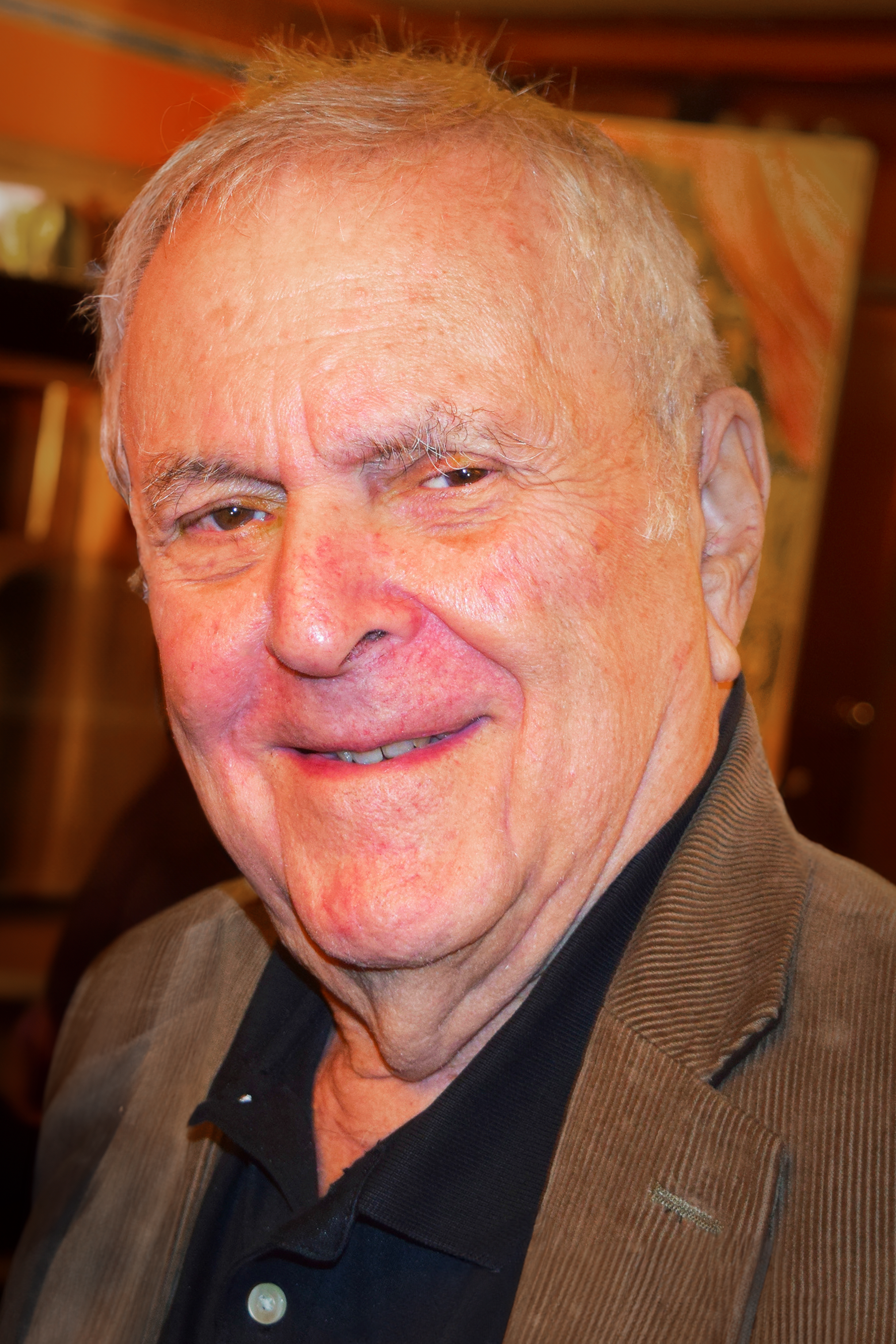
- Kander in 2023

Background information
- Born: John Harold Kander; March 18, 1927 (age 99); Kansas City, Missouri, U.S.
- Genres: Musical theatre, film, television
- Occupation: Composer
- Instrument: Piano
- Years active: 1957–present
- Spouse: Albert Stephenson (m. 2010)

John Harold Kander (born March 18, 1927) is an American composer, known largely for his work in the musical theater. As part of the songwriting team Kander and Ebb (with lyricist Fred Ebb), Kander wrote the scores for 15 musicals, including Cabaret (1966) and Chicago (1975), both of which were later adapted into acclaimed films. He and Ebb also wrote the standard "New York, New York" (officially known as "Theme from New York, New York"). The team received numerous nominations, including eleven for Tony Awards (won four, followed by a Lifetime Achievement Award for Kander), two nominations for Academy Awards, and five for Golden Globe Awards.

== Early life ==
John Kander, the second son of Harold and Bernice (Aaron) Kander, was born on March 18, 1927, in Kansas City, Missouri. He has stated that he grew up in a loving, middle-class Jewish family and maintained a lifelong close relationship with his older brother, Edward, who became a sales manager at a brokerage house in the city. Kander attributes his early interest in music (starting at age four) to the family's love of singing around the piano. His first composition was a Christmas carol, written during second-grade mathematics class; his teacher's encouragement led to the school choir singing it for a holiday assembly. The teacher discreetly asked Kander's parents for permission to use the song, since he is Jewish. He attended his first opera performances at the age of nine, when the San Carlo Opera came to Kansas City with productions of Aida and Madama Butterfly. According to Kander, "My mother took me and we sat in the first row. There were these giants on the stage, and my feet were dangling over my seat. It was overwhelming for me, even though I could see the strings that held the beards on the Egyptian soldiers.... My interest in telling a story through music in many ways derived from early experiences like those."

Kander attended Westport High School before transferring to the Pembroke Country-Day School. During World War II, Kander joined the U.S. Merchant Marine Cadet Corps. After completing his training in California and sailing between San Francisco and Asia, Kander left the Corps on May 3, 1946. However, due to rule changes governing national service, Kander was forced to enlist in the Army Reserves in September of the same year, after having completed one semester at the Oberlin Conservatory of Music. During the Korean War, Kander was ordered back into active duty, but he had to remain in New York City for six months of observation after a medical exam revealed scars on his lungs. He was officially discharged on July 3, 1957.

Kander graduated with a degree in music at Oberlin College in 1951 and went on to graduate studies at Columbia University, where he was a protégé of Douglas Moore and studied composition with Jack Beeson and Otto Luening. He earned his master's degree from Columbia University in 1953.

== Career ==
Following his studies, Kander began conducting at summer theaters before serving as a rehearsal pianist for the musical West Side Story by Leonard Bernstein and Jerome Robbins in New York. While working, Kander met the choreographer Jerome Robbins, who suggested that Kander compose dance music. After that experience, he wrote dance arrangements for Gypsy in 1959 and Irma la Douce in 1960.

Kander's first produced musical was A Family Affair in 1962, written with James and William Goldman. The same year, Kander met Fred Ebb through their mutual publisher, Tommy Valando. The first song Kander and Ebb wrote together, "My Coloring Book", was made popular by a recording from Sandy Stewart. Their second song, "I Don't Care Much", was made famous by Barbra Streisand, and Kander and Ebb became a permanent team.

In 1965, Kander and Ebb wrote music for their first show on Broadway, Flora the Red Menace, produced by Hal Prince, directed by George Abbott, and with book by George Abbott and Robert Russell, in which Liza Minnelli made her Broadway debut.

Kander and Ebb have since been associated with writing material for both Liza Minnelli and Chita Rivera (including the musicals Zorba, Chicago, The Rink, and Kiss of the Spider Woman) and have produced special material for their appearances live and on television, such as Liza with a Z. Most notably, Kander and Ebb wrote the dramatic title song that Minnelli introduced in her 1977 film, New York, New York, at the request of director Martin Scorsese and co-star Robert De Niro.

The Broadway musicals Cabaret and Chicago have been made into films. The film version of Chicago won several 2002 Academy Awards, including for best picture, film editing, costume design, art direction and sound. In his musicological and biographical study of the collaboration of Kander and Ebb, James Leve discusses the full history of Cabaret and Chicago in chapters titled "The Divinely Decadent Lives of Cabaret" and "Chicago: Broadway to Hollywood". As Leve notes, Cabaret, a musical adaptation of Christopher Isherwood's The Berlin Stories, was an "ideal vehicle for Kander and Ebb's brittle and self-referential brand of musical theater." This insight also holds true for Chicago.

Kander, along with Ebb, also wrote songs for Thornton Wilder's The Skin of Our Teeth, which was set to premiere in London, but the rights were pulled by Wilder's nephew. Kander also says that Harvey Schmidt and Tom Jones, the writers of The Fantasticks, wrote a musical of Wilder's Our Town, which took them thirteen years to write, only to have the rights pulled as well by the nephew.

Ebb died in 2004, and Kander's first musical without Ebb in many years, The Landing, with book and lyrics by Greg Pierce, premiered off-Broadway at the Vineyard Theatre on October 23, 2013. The musical, which was a series of three "mini-musicals", was directed by Walter Bobbie and starred David Hyde Pierce and Julia Murney.

Kander's musical Kid Victory, with book and lyrics by Greg Pierce, had its world premiere February 28, 2015, at the Signature Theatre in Arlington, Virginia. Kid Victory premiered off-Broadway at the Vineyard Theatre on February 1, 2017, in previews, and opened officially on February 22, 2017. Direction was by Liesl Tommy, with choreography by Christopher Windom. The cast featured Jeffry Denman and Karen Ziemba.

Kander (music) and David Thompson (lyrics) wrote the dance play The Beast in the Jungle, which opened off-Broadway in 2018 at the Vineyard Theatre. The play was directed and choreographed by Susan Stroman, and featured Tony Yazbeck and Irina Dvorovenko. Kander (music) collaborated with Lin-Manuel Miranda (lyrics) for Miranda's Hamildrops series: "Cheering for Me Now" is an uplifting track about New York's ratification of the constitution.

James Leve discusses Kander's prolific career and his late musical style in the essay "John Kander: the First Ninety-Two Years".

== Personal life ==
In 2010, Kander married dancer and choreographer Albert Stephenson, his partner since 1977, in Toronto. Kander's grand-nephew Jason Kander was formerly the Missouri Secretary of State.

== Works ==
Lyrics by Fred Ebb unless otherwise noted

=== Theatre ===
- A Family Affair (1962) – lyrics by William Goldman
- Flora the Red Menace (1965)
- Cabaret (1966)
- Go Fly a Kite (1966) – music and lyrics also by Walter Marks
- The Happy Time (1967)
- Zorba (1968)
- 70, Girls, 70 (1971)
- Chicago (1975)
- The Act (1977)
- Woman of the Year (1981)
- The Rink (1984)
- Diamonds (1984) – two songs: "Winter In New York" and "Diamonds Are Forever"
- And The World Goes 'Round (1991)
- Kiss of the Spider Woman (1992)
- Steel Pier (1997)
- Fosse (1999)
- Over and Over (1999) – working title: The Skin Of Our Teeth
- The Visit (2001)
- Curtains (2006) – additional lyrics by Kander and Rupert Holmes
- All About Us (2007 revision of Over and Over)
- The Scottsboro Boys (2010) (Additional lyrics by Kander)
- The Landing (2013) - lyrics by Greg Pierce
- Kid Victory (2015) - lyrics by Greg Pierce
- The Beast in the Jungle (2018)
- New York, New York (2023) - lyrics by Fred Ebb with additional lyrics by Lin Manuel Miranda

=== Film ===
Kander and Ebb also contributed songs for the following movies:

- Cabaret (1972) – 12 songs (mostly originally from the musical of the same name)
- Funny Lady (1975) – 6 songs
- Lucky Lady (1976) – 2 songs
- A Matter of Time, aka Nina (1976) – 2 songs
- New York, New York (1977) – 4 songs
- French Postcards (1979) – 1 song
- Stepping Out (1991) – 1 song ("Stepping Out")
- Chicago (2002) – 15 songs (mostly originally from the musical of the same name, plus one song cut from the original show, which runs under the end credits)
- Kiss of the Spider Woman (2025) – 14 songs (mostly originally from the musical of the same name)

Film scores

- Something for Everyone (1970)
- Kramer vs. Kramer (1979) (score rejected, replaced with pre-existing music such a classical music pieces)
- Still of the Night (1982)
- Blue Skies Again (1983)
- Places in the Heart (1984)
- An Early Frost (TV film, NBC, 1985)
- I Want to Go Home (1989)
- Billy Bathgate (1991) (score rejected, replaced by Mark Isham)
- Breathing Lessons (TV film, CBS, 1994)
- The Boys Next Door (TV film, CBS, 1996)

=== Television ===
- Liza! (1970)
- Ol' Blue Eyes Is Back (1973) (Frank Sinatra)
- Liza with a Z (1972)
- Gypsy in my Soul (1976) (Shirley MacLaine)
- Baryshnikov on Broadway (1980)
- Liza in London (1986)
- Sam Found Out, A Triple Play (1988)
- Liza Minnelli, Live From Radio City Music Hall (1992)

== Awards and nominations ==
Organizations	Year	Category	Work	Result	Ref.
Academy Awards	1975	Best Original Song	"How Lucky Can You Get", Funny Lady	Nominated	
Academy Awards	2002	Best Original Song	"I Move On", Chicago	Nominated	
BAFTA Awards	2002	Best Original Music	Chicago	Nominated	
Golden Globe Awards	1972	Best Original Song	"Mein Herr", Cabaret	Nominated	
Golden Globe Awards	1972	Best Original Song	"Money, Money", Cabaret	Nominated	
Golden Globe Awards	1975	Best Original Score	Funny Lady	Nominated	
Golden Globe Awards	1975	Best Original Song	"How Lucky Can You Get", Funny Lady	Nominated	
Golden Globe Awards	1977	Best Original Song	"New York, New York", New York, New York	Nominated	
Grammy Awards	1963	Song of the Year	"My Coloring Book"	Nominated	
Grammy Awards	1968	Best Musical Theater Album	Cabaret	Won	
Grammy Awards	1969	Best Musical Theater Album	The Happy Time	Nominated	
Grammy Awards	1970	Best Musical Theater Album	Zorba	Nominated	
Grammy Awards	1976	Best Musical Theater Album	Chicago	Nominated	
Grammy Awards	1981	Song of the Year	Theme from New York, New York	Nominated	
Grammy Awards	1982	Best Musical Theater Album	Woman of the Year	Nominated	
Grammy Awards	1994	Best Musical Theater Album	Kiss of the Spider Woman	Nominated	
Grammy Awards	2004	Best Song Written for Visual Media	"I Move On", Chicago	Nominated	
Primetime Emmy Awards	1973	Outstanding Music Composition for a Special Program	Liza with a Z	Nominated	
Primetime Emmy Awards	1973	Outstanding Original Music and Lyrics	Liza with a Z	Won	
Primetime Emmy Awards	1986	Outstanding Music Composition for a Miniseries or Special	An Early Frost	Nominated	
Primetime Emmy Awards	1993	Outstanding Music & Lyrics	"Sorry I Asked", Liza Minnelli Live! From Radio City Music Hall	Won	
Laurence Olivier Award	1998	Best Musical	Chicago	Won	
Tony Awards	1967	Composer and Lyricst	Cabaret	Won	
Tony Awards	1968	Composer and Lyricst	The Happy Time	Nominated	
Tony Awards	1976	Best Original Score	Chicago	Nominated	
Tony Awards	1978	Best Original Score	The Act	Nominated	
Tony Awards	1981	Best Original Score	Woman of the Year	Won	
Tony Awards	1984	Best Original Score	The Rink	Nominated	
Tony Awards	1993	Best Original Score	Kiss of the Spider Woman	Won	
Tony Awards	1997	Best Original Score	Steel Pier	Nominated	
Tony Awards	2007	Best Original Score	Curtains	Nominated	
Tony Awards	2011	Best Original Score	The Scottsboro Boys	Nominated	
Tony Awards	2015	Best Original Score	The Visit	Nominated	
Tony Awards	2023	Lifetime Achievement Award		Won	

== Honorary awards ==
Organizations	Year	Award	Result	Ref.
American Theater Hall of Fame	1991	Inductee	Honored	
Kennedy Center Honors	1998	Medal	Honored	
Signature Theater	2018	Stephen Sondheim Award	Honored	
The Varsity Show	2021	I.A.L. Diamond Award	Honored	
