= Never Gonna Dance =

- Music: Jerome Kern
- Lyrics: Oscar Hammerstein; Ira Gershwin; P. G. Wodehouse; Bernard Dougall; Johnny Mercer; Jimmy McHugh; Otto Harbach; Dorothy Fields
- Book: Jeffrey Hatcher
- Basis: Film Swing Time
- Productions: 2003 Broadway

Never Gonna Dance is a Broadway musical featuring the music of Jerome Kern. The musical was based on the 1936 Fred Astaire/Ginger Rogers film Swing Time. Lyricists include Oscar Hammerstein, Ira Gershwin, P. G. Wodehouse, Bernard Dougall, Johnny Mercer, Jimmy McHugh, Otto Harbach, and Dorothy Fields.

It opened on Broadway in 2003.

== Production ==
The musical opened on December 4, 2003 at the Broadhurst Theatre and closed on February 15, 2004 after 84 performances and 44 previews. It was directed by Michael Greif with choreography by Jerry Mitchell, costumes by William Ivey Long, lighting by Paul Gallo, and sets by Robin Wagner. The cast featured Noah Racey (Lucky), Nancy Lemenager (Penny), Karen Ziemba (Mabel) and Peter Gerety (Alfred J. Morganthal).

== Synopsis ==
John "Lucky" Garnett is a dancer in vaudeville. His fiancée's father does not think Lucky can make a living without dancing. Lucky is determined to prove that he can earn a living without dancing, and so goes to New York on a bet with his lucky quarter to make $25,000. There he meets and falls in love with Penny Carroll, a dance teacher. They enter a dance contest. Meanwhile, Penny's friend Mabel finds romance with a down-on-his-luck stockbroker, Alfred.

== Songs ==
Act I

- "Dearly Beloved" (Lyrics By Johnny Mercer) — Lucky Garnett and His Charms
- "Put Me to the Test" (Lyrics By Ira Gershwin) — Lucky Garnett
- "I Won't Dance" (Lyrics By Oscar Hammerstein II, Jimmy McHugh, Otto Harbach and Dorothy Fields) — Lucky Garnett and The Company
- "Pick Yourself Up" — Penny Carroll and Lucky Garnett
- "Pick Yourself Up" (Reprise) — Mabel Pritt and Alfred J. Morgenthal
- "Who?" (Lyrics By Oscar Hammerstein II and Otto Harbach) — Ricardo Romero and the Rome-Tones
- "I'm Old Fashioned" (Lyrics By Johnny Mercer) — Penny Carroll
- "She Didn't Say Yes, She Didn't Say No"(Lyrics By Otto Harbach) — Spud and Velma
- "The Song Is You" (Lyrics By Oscar Hammerstein II) — Mabel Pritt, Alfred J. Morgenthal and Waitresses
- "The Way You Look Tonight" — Lucky Garnett and Penny Carroll

Act II

- "Waltz in Swing Time" — The Company
- "Shimmy With Me" (Lyrics By P. G. Wodehouse) — Mabel Pritt and The Company
- "A Fine Romance" — Penny Carroll, Lucky Garnett, Mabel Pritt and Alfred J. Morgenthal
- "I'll Be Hard to Handle" (Lyrics By Bernard Dougall) — Spud and Velma
- "I Got Love" — Mabel Pritt
- "The Most Exciting Night" (Lyrics By Otto Harbach and Dorothy Fields) — Ricardo Romero and the Rome-Tones
- "Remind Me" — Penny Carroll and Lucky Garnett
- "Never Gonna Dance" — Lucky Garnett and Penny Carroll
- "Dearly Beloved" / "I Won't Dance" (Reprise) — The Company

== Response ==
Reviews were mixed. For example, Ben Brantley in The New York Times deemed it a "pleasant" but "spiceless" production. A review by Michael Feingold in The Village Voice was more positive, citing a convoluted plot and some miscast actors, but praising the musical numbers as "reassuringly good".

John Kenrick reviewed the musical for Musicals101, praising the choreography, costumes, lighting and scenic design: "Jerry Mitchell has turned out some effective dances, and the physical production boast period-perfect costumes by William Ivey Long, stunning lighting by Paul Gallo, and some striking New York sets by the great Robin Wagner." However, he noting miscasting, and "The second act spins out of control."

== Awards and nominations ==
=== Original Broadway production ===
Year	Award ceremony	Category	Nominee	Result
2004	Tony Award	Best Choreography	Jerry Mitchell	Nominated
2004	Tony Award	Best Featured Actress in a Musical	Karen Ziemba	Nominated
2004	Drama Desk Award	Outstanding Choreography	Jerry Mitchell	Nominated
2004	Drama Desk Award	Outstanding Orchestrations	Harold Wheeler	Nominated
2004	Outer Critics Circle Award	Outstanding Choreography	Jerry Mitchell	Nominated
2004	Outer Critics Circle Award	Outstanding Featured Actress in a Musical	Karen Ziemba	Won
2004	Drama League Award	Distinguished Production of a Musical		Nominated
