= Douglas J. Cohen =

American composer and lyricist

Douglas J. Cohen is an American composer and lyricist. He is a member of ASCAP, BMI Lehman Engel Musical Theater Workshop, and the Dramatists Guild of America.

== Works ==
- The Big Time - Book by Douglas Carter Beane, music & lyrics by Cohen.
- No Way to Treat a Lady (Off-Broadway 1987, revised 1996); based on the novel by William Goldman
- The Gig
- Children's Letters to God - Book by Stoo Hample, music by David Evans, and lyrics by Cohen
- The Opposite of Sex
- Barnstormer - with Cheryl L. Davis
- Glimmerglass - Book by Jonathan Bolt and lyrics by Ted Drachman
- A Charles Dickens Christmas
- Boozy
- Valentino's Tango - Music by Howard Marren
- Columbus
- When The Cookie Crumbles, You Can Still Pick Up The Pieces
- God's Hand
- How to Survive a Killer Musical: Agony and Ecstasy on the Road to Broadway (Applause Books, 2023, 9781493075744)

== Awards and grants ==
- Richard Rodgers Development Grant from American Academy and Institute of Arts and Letters - (No Way To Treat A Lady)
- Richard Rodgers Development Grant from American Academy and Institute of Arts and Letters - (The Gig)
- Nominated for 2 Outer Critics Circle Award (No Way To Treat A Lady)
- 1998 Gilman & Gonzalez-Falla Theatre Foundation Award - (Glimmerglass, No Way To Treat A Lady, The Big Time, The Gig)
- 2005 Jonathan Larson Award - (Barnstormer)
- 2005 Drama Desk Award nomination for Outstanding Lyricist - (Children's Letters to God)
- 2009 Noël Coward Award - (The Gig)
