= Kid Victory =

Musical by John Kander and Greg Pierce

- Kid Victory logo (2017 Vineyard Theatre Production)
- Music: John Kander
- Lyrics: Greg Pierce
- Book: Greg Pierce
- Productions: 2015 Signature Theatre; 2017 Vineyard Theatre
- Awards: Outer Critics Circle Award - Outstanding New Musical (nominated)

Kid Victory is a musical with the story by John Kander and Greg Pierce, and music by John Kander, book and lyrics by Greg Pierce, co-produced by Vineyard Theatre and Signature Theatre.

== Production ==
The musical premiered at the Signature Theatre, Arlington, Virginia from February 17 to March 22, 2015. The show was subsequently reworked and performed Off-Broadway at the Vineyard Theatre from February 1, 2017 to March 19, 2017. Direction was by Liesl Tommy with choreography by Christopher Windom. Its 2017 showing was described by its producers as a "hauntingly mesmerizing original musical" about "breaking out and breaking through".

=== Background ===
Kander and Pierce met when Kander visited students at his alma mater, Oberlin College, where Pierce was a student. They kept in touch as Pierce graduated, moved to New York, and began his career in theater, acting and writing. The two wrote a chamber musical together, The Landing, which ran Off-Broadway in 2013. For Kid Victory, they looked at many kidnapping cases. Kander observed :"I think the thing that appealed was that there’s nothing about adjusting back into life, or very little in terms of our research. When you think about it, that’s the main thing. Terrible things happen to people, but what happens then? How do you manage? Who do you become?"

== Plot ==
17 year old high school senior and sailboat enthusiast Luke returns to his small, Kansas town after an unplanned, unannounced one-year absence. Luke finds it difficult to reconnect with friends and family or to focus on school work. He experiences recurrent flashbacks of his year-long absence and the events and relationship leading up to it. Luke had been communicating on the internet with Michael; his screen name was "Kid Victory". As he tries to readjust, Luke develops a growing friendship with the town misfit, divorcee Emily. His parents, Eileen and Joseph, finally understand that to reconnect with their son, they must confront unnerving truths about his disappearance.

== Casts ==
Sources: Playbill; BroadwayWorld

Character	Arlington, Virginia (2015)	Off–Broadway (2017)
Luke	Jake Winn	Brandon Flynn
Mom/Eileen	Christiane Noll	Karen Ziemba
Dad/Joseph	Christopher Bloch	Daniel Jenkins
Emily	Sarah Litzsinger	Dee Roscioli
Suze/Girl	Laura Darrell	Laura Darrell
Andrew/Boy	Parker Drown	Blake Zolfo
Gail/Woman	Valerie Leonard	Ann Arvia
Detective Marks/Man	Bobby Smith	Joel Blum
Michael	Jeffry Denman	Jeffry Denman

== Songs ==
Note: Songs listed as performed in the Off-Broadway production, 2017

- Lord, Carry Me Home
- A Single Tear
- Plain White Card
- Lawn
- You Are the Marble
- I'll Marry the Man
- People Like Us
- Vinland
- Not Quite True
- There Was a Boy
- Dear Mara
- I'd Rather Wait
- Regatta 500
- What's the Point
- You, If Anyone
- Where We Are

== Critical response ==
Kid Victory at the Signature Theatre was reviewed by The Washington Times. The reviewer wrote: "This is dark material, made no less traumatic by the fact that this is, after all, a musical. The songs by Mr. Kander and Mr. Pierce vacillate between the morbid and the light of foot... Liesl Tommy’s direction takes full advantage of the Signature’s expansive stage, allowing her to block multiple scenes simultaneously, often in inspired counterpoint. This has the effect of giving the audience a choice of where to direct attention and seeks active participation...the story and the production are strangely lacking in empathy between material and audience.".

For its 2017 production, Kid Victory was reviewed by The Hollywood Reporter and by The Guardian

Ben Brantley in his review for The New York Times of the Off-Broadway production, wrote: "...the subject of 'Kid Victory' feels especially unpromising for any musical that doesn’t aspire to grim, grand (guignol) opera or creepy camp. And this latest teaming of Mr. Kander and Mr. Pierce ... definitely has other aspirations, toward a laudable but elusive psychology delicacy... Mr. Kander mines a number of musical veins, including the jaunty jazz and vaudeville pastiches for which he is best known, with results that are scattered, a bit bewilderingly, among the characters."

== Awards and nominations ==
The Off-Broadway production received 2017 nominations:

- Lucille Lortel Awards — Outstanding Featured Actress in a Musical, Karen Ziemba
- Outer Critics Circle Award — Outstanding New Off-Broadway Musical
- Drama Desk Award — Outstanding Featured Actor in a Musical, Jeffry Denman
- Chita Rivera Awards — Outstanding Male Dancer in an Off-Broadway Show, Blake Zolfo
