= Southern Light Opera Company =

Scottish operatic society

The Southern Light Opera Company the oldest amateur operatic society based in the Scottish city of Edinburgh. It performs an annual production of a musical or operetta each spring. Southern Light is a registered Charity.

== History ==
The company was founded on 6 March 1897, in the Union Hotel, Cockburn street, Edinburgh. The first five shows were performed in the Operetta House in Chambers Street. The next production marked the company's only performance in Edinburgh's Theatre Royal. From 1902 to 1924 Southern Light performed in the Royal Lyceum Theatre. Since then all shows (apart from three) have been performed in the King's Theatre on Leven Street. The company returned to the Lyceum for one year for the 2012 production of Curtains.
