= Milwaukee Repertory Theater =

American theater company

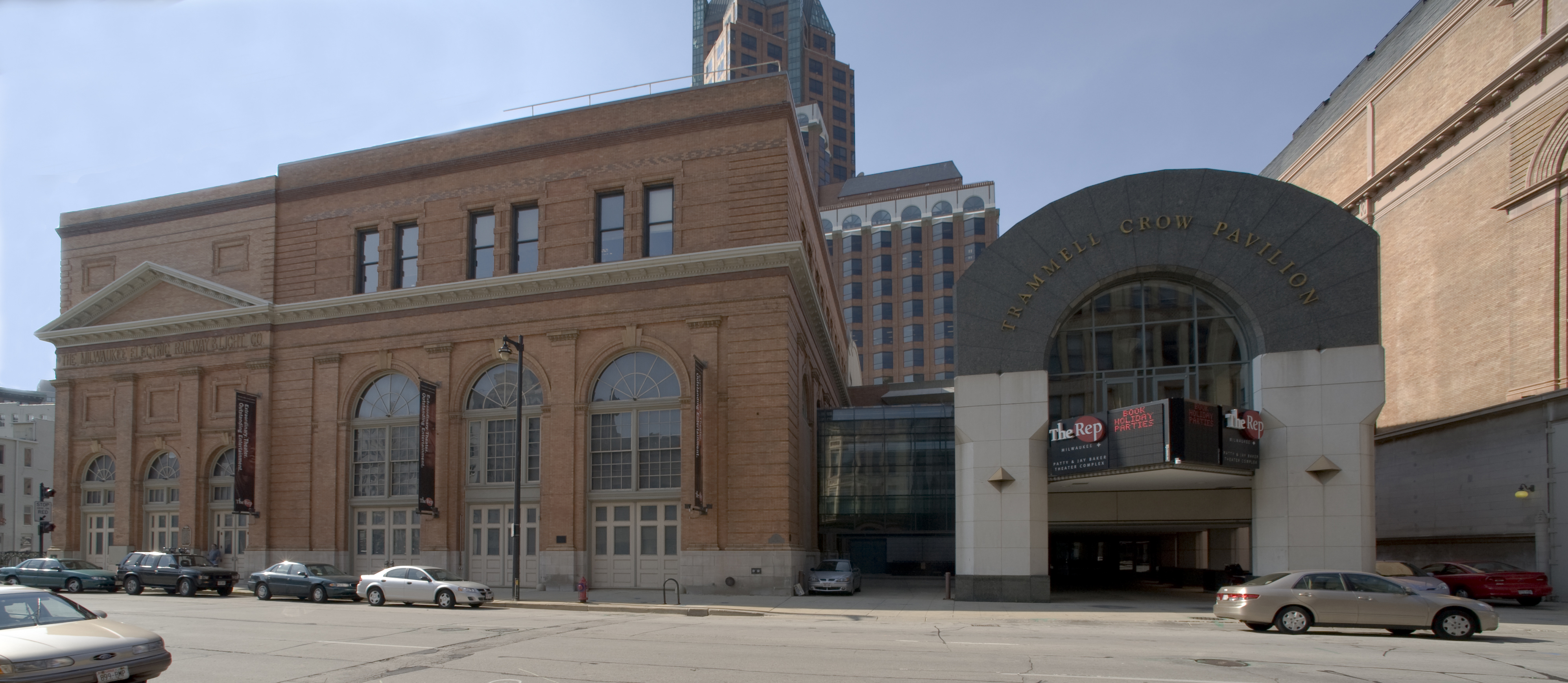
- Interactive map of Milwaukee Repertory Theater
- Address: 108 E Wells Street; Milwaukee, Wisconsin; United States
- Coordinates: 43.0408808°N 87.9113174°W
- Capacity: Checota Powerhouse Theater: 568-671; Herro-Franke Theater: 205; Stackner Cabaret: 186
- Type: Regional Theater
- Public transit: MCTS

Construction
- Opened: 1954
- Reopened: 1987 (current location)

Website
- www.milwaukeerep.com

Milwaukee Repertory Theater ("Milwaukee Rep") is a theater company in Milwaukee, Wisconsin. Founded as the Fred Miller Theatre Company, the group is housed in the Associated Bank Theater Center, which includes the Ellen & Joe Checota Powerhouse Theater, the Herro-Franke Studio Theater, and the Stackner Cabaret. Milwaukee Rep produces eleven productions each year, along with an annual production of A Christmas Carol at the Pabst Theater. It serves an annual audience of over 200,000 patrons, including over 15,000 subscribers, the largest in the state of Wisconsin in terms of audiences served.

== History ==
After being established as the Fred Miller Theatre Company, the name was changed to Milwaukee Repertory Theater in the late 1950s, to reflect its growing catalogue of classic and contemporary plays, and a commitment to develop the resident acting community. In 1968, it moved from its original space—the Fred Miller Theatre, on Oakland Ave.—to the Todd Wehr Theater at the Performing Art Center in downtown Milwaukee. In 1974, a small warehouse was converted into the experimental Court Street Theater, which served as a laboratory for creative exploration and a testing ground for new playwrights. Milwaukee Repertory Theater moved to its current location in 1987 and closed its Court Street operations. The theater is now located on the east bank of the Milwaukee River in Associated Bank Theater Center at 108 E Wells St, Milwaukee, Wisconsin.

Milwaukee Repertory Theater is dedicated to presenting new playwrights, reliving classics, and commissioning translations of classic and contemporary foreign playwrights. Each year, Milwaukee Rep welcomes up to 275,000 people at nearly 700 performances of 15 productions ranging from compelling dramas, powerful classics, new plays and full-scale musicals in its three unique performance venues. Since 1958, Milwaukee Repertory Theater has premiered nearly 150 plays and musicals. Historically the theater has put on annual holiday productions of Charles Dickens' A Christmas Carol at the historic Pabst Theater since 1976. In 2012, Milwaukee Rep recorded a deficit of nearly $400,000, despite an increase in total ticket revenue of 60% from the previous season. Coming out of the recession, Milwaukee Rep refined its budget, increased ticket sales, and received a single donation of half a million dollars helping to pay down the accumulated deficit from past seasons.

After raising $80+ million through its Powering Milwaukee campaign, in fall 2025, the theater is set to complete a major renovation and open the 152,500+ square-foot Associated Bank Theater Center, which includes the Ellen & Joe Checota Powerhouse Theater, the Herro-Franke Studio Theater and the Stackner Cabaret. The Powerhouse Theater is designed for flexibility, capable of transforming between a proscenium and thrust stage to suit production needs. The renovation also improved accessibility through expanded programs and adaptive technologies, including new listening devices and upgraded walkways. Additionally, the project introduced the Herzfeld Foundation Education & Engagement Center, a new facility with event and education spaces, expected to serve more than 20,000 students annually.

=== Theater spaces ===
- 568 to 671-seat Ellen and Joe Checota Powerhouse Thrust/Proscenium Stage
- 205-seat Herro-Franke Studio
- 186-seat Stackner Cabaret Theater, bar, and restaurant

=== World Premieres ===
Title	Author(s)	Year	Notes
The Last Days of a Young Man	James Andrews	1958	
Adam the Creator	Ray Boyle and Sam Lawent	1960	
Tartuffe	Translated by Richard Wilbur from the play by Molière	1962	
All Together Now	Nagle Jackson, Jeffrey Tambor, and Milwaukee Repertory Theater Company	1972	
An Occasional Piece Suitable to the Openings of Theaters	Nagle Jackson	1973	
Fighting Bob	Tom Cole	1979	
How I Got That Story	Amlin Gray	1979	
Lakeboat	David Mamet	1980	
The Nerd	Larry Shue	1981	
The Foreigner	Larry Shue	1984	
Work Song	Eric Simonson and Jeffrey Hatcher	2000	
The Bachelors	Fred Alley and James Kaplan	2001	
Moby Dick	Adapted by Eric Simonson	2002	
Winter Wonderettes	Roger Bean	2003	
Bach at Leipzig	Itamar Moses	2004	
Sherlock Holmes: The Final Adventure	Steven Dietz	2005	
Holmes and Watson: A Musical Mystery	Jahnna Beecham and Malcom Hilgartner	2009	
Soultime at the Apollo	Kevin Ramsey	2009	
Liberace!	Brent Hazelton	2010	
after all the terrible things I do	A. Rey Pamatmat	2014	
Back Home Again: On The Road with John Denver	Randal Myler and Dan Wheetman	2015	
Five Presidents	Rick Cleveland	2015	
American Song	Joanna Murray-Smith	2016	
Sirens of Song	Kevin Ramsey	2016	
A Christmas Carol	Adapted by Mark Clements	2016	
Mark Twain’s River of Song	Randal Myler and Dan Wheetman	2018	
One House Over	Catherine Trieschmann	2018	
Antonio’s Song / I Was Dreaming of a Son	Dael Orlandersmith	2021	
New Age	Dael Orlandersmith	2021	
The Heart Sellers	Lloyd Suh	2023	
Run Bambi Run	Eric Simonson and Gordon Gano	2023	
The Craic	Mark Clements and Deanie Vallone	2025	
George & Gracie: A Love Story	Tami Workentin	2026	

=== Notable artists ===
At Fred Miller Theater:

- Betty White - actress
- Rita Moreno - actress
- Ann B. Davis - actress
- Geraldine Page - actress
- Ethel Waters - actress
- Gloria Grahame - actress
- Eva Le Gallienne - actress
- Rosemary Harris - actress
- Christina Pickles - actress
- Olga Bielinska - actress
- Jeffrey Lynn - actor
- John Carradine - actor
- Will Geer - actor
- Edward Everett Horton - actor
- Frank McHugh - actor
- Ed Flanders - actor
- Richard Dysart - actor
- Larry Linville - actor

At Milwaukee Repertory Theater:

- Judith Light - member of the Rep's company
- Erika Slezak - member of The Rep's company
- Ayad Akhtar - playwright of Disgraced, The Who and The What, and McNeal
- Marc Alaimo - member of the Rep's Company (1967—1970)
- Dick Enberg - writer of McGuire, 2022–2023 Season
- Anthony Crivello - cast of McGuire, 2022–2023 Season
- Tom Hulce - cast of Romeo and Juliet, 1978–79 Season
- David Mamet - playwright, Lakeboat, 1980–81 Season, premiere
- Chris Noth - cast of The Torch 1988–89 Season
- Larry Shue - member of The Rep's company
- Jeffrey Tambor - three seasons at the Rep (1971—75)
- Carmen Cusack - cast of Ragtime, 2013–2024 Season
- Gordon Gano - composer of Run, Bambi, Run, 2023–2024 Season
- Armando Gutierrez - cast of Run, Bambi, Run, 2023-2024 Season
- Chris McCarrell - cast of Prelude to a Kiss a musical, 2024/25 Season
- Karen Ziemba - cast of Prelude to a Kiss a musical, 2024/25 Season
- Caitlin Houlahan - cast of Prelude to a Kiss a musical, 2024/25 Season

== Community involvement ==
Milwaukee Rep's community programs include student matinées, facility tours, residencies, and in-school workshops. It contributes complimentary tickets to Milwaukee area non-profit fund-raisers. Milwaukee Rep also sponsors adult acting classes, public lectures and discussions, pre-show "The Rep-In-Depth" presentations in the Quadracci Powerhouse and Stiemke Studio, and audience talk-backs. Additional patron features include "pay-what-you-can" performances, audio described performances, American Sign Language-interpreted performances, captioned performances and numerous special events including Opening Night and Closing Night parties. The Friends of Milwaukee Repertory Theater is its official volunteer organization.

Milwaukee Rep is also home to one of the oldest internship programs in regional theater. Each season acting, directing, and production interns join the company full-time to gain experience in professional theater. Mark Clements is the current artistic director and Chad Bauman is the current Ellen & Joe Checota executive director.

== Awards and notable mentions ==
Time Magazine

- Top Ten Theater of the Year, Moby Dick - 2002

New York Times

- 15 Shows to See on Stages Around the U.S. This Fall, Prelude to a Kiss A Musical - 2024

BroadwayWorld Milwaukee

- Theatre of the Year - 2019
- Best Play, Things I Know to be True - 2019
- Best Musical, West Side Story - 2019
- Best Play, An Iliad - 2014
- Theatre of the Year - 2014

Yomuri-Shinbun Award

- Silence - 1995

Harold and Mimi Steinberg/American Theatre Critics Association New Play Award

- The Heart Sellers by Lloyd Suh - 2023
