= Warning: Parental Advisory =

- Promotional poster
- Written by: Jay Martel
- Directed by: Mark S. Waters
- Starring: Jason Priestley; Mariel Hemingway; Dee Snider; Lois Chiles; Deborah Yates; Tim Guinee; Griffin Dunne
- Music by: Christopher Lennertz
- Country of origin: United States
- Original language: English

Production
- Executive producers: Steven Haft; Stephen Tao; Melissa Cobb
- Producers: John J. McMahon; Howard Griffith
- Cinematography: Alex Nepomniaschy
- Editor: Pamela Martin
- Running time: 100 minutes
- Production companies: Haft Entertainment; ROI Films; Wilshire Court Productions

Original release
- Network: VH1
- Release: April 21, 2002

Warning: Parental Advisory is a 2002 American comedy-drama television film directed by Mark Waters and written by Jay Martel. The film follows the story of Dee Snider, John Denver, and Frank Zappa, testifying before Congress against lyrics labeling laws.

The film focuses on the formation of the Parents Music Resource Center and its impact on music during 1985. It stars Jason Priestley, Mariel Hemingway as Tipper Gore, Griffin Dunne as Zappa, and Snider as himself. The introductory speech that Snider gave in the film before testifying is the same speech he gave in 1985.

== Cast ==
- Jason Priestley as Charlie Burner
- Mariel Hemingway as Tipper Gore
- Dee Snider as himself
- Lois Chiles as Susan Baker
- Deborah Yates as Pamela Stone
- Tim Guinee as John Denver
- Griffin Dunne as Frank Zappa
- Deborah Jolly as Shirley
- Lee Burns as Andrew Norris
- John S. Davies as Dave Gorman
- Jim Beatty as Al Gore
- Richard Dillard as Senator Sam
- Gail Cronauer as Senator Paula Hawkins
- Joe Berryman as Donald Bean
- David Born as James Baker
- Dina Waters as Receptionist
- Tom Prior as Senator Sam's Aide
- Alex Harder as Pizza Guy
- Anthony Marble as Record Store Clerk
- William Caploe as Dom
- Michael Crabtree as Senator Danforth
- Eleese Lester as PMRC Receptionist
- Tony Richards as Press Club Reporter
- Cherry Petty as Curtis's Assistant
- Dwight Adair as Frank Zappa's Manager

== See also ==
- Parental Advisory
