= Curtains (musical) =

Musical

- Original Broadway Cast Album
- Music: John Kander
- Lyrics: Fred Ebb; John Kander (additional lyrics); Rupert Holmes (additional lyrics)
- Book: Rupert Holmes
- Basis: Curtains by Peter Stone
- Productions: 2006 Los Angeles, California; 2007 Broadway; 2010 US tour 2019 UK tour 2019 West End
- Awards: Drama Desk Award for Outstanding Book of a Musical

Curtains is a musical mystery comedy with a book by Rupert Holmes, lyrics by Fred Ebb, and music by John Kander, with additional lyrics by Kander and Holmes.

Based on the original book and concept of the same name by Peter Stone, the musical is a send-up of backstage murder mystery plots. Set in 1959 Boston, Massachusetts, it follows the fallout when Jessica Cranshaw, the supremely untalented star of Robbin' Hood of the Old West is murdered during her opening night curtain call. It is up to Lt. Frank Cioffi, a police detective who moonlights as a musical theatre fan, to save the show, solve the case, and maybe even find love before the show reopens, without getting killed himself. Cioffi also dreams of being in musical theatre. The show opened on Broadway to mixed reviews, though several critics praised the libretto and the character of Lieutenant Cioffi, who critic Ben Brantley called "the best damn musical theatre character since Mama Rose in Gypsy, and the best role of David Hyde Pierce's career."

== Production history ==
Stone died in April 2003, leaving the book unfinished, and Holmes was hired to rewrite it. Ebb also died in September 2004, before the musical was completed. Curtains had its world premiere on July 25, 2006, at the Ahmanson Theatre in Los Angeles. Local reviews were mixed but not discouraging, and the producers decided to transfer the show to Broadway with minor alterations.

The production, directed by Scott Ellis and choreographed by Rob Ashford, opened on Broadway on March 22, 2007, at the Al Hirschfeld Theatre. The cast included David Hyde Pierce, Debra Monk, Karen Ziemba, Edward Hibbert, Jason Danieley, Noah Racey, Jill Paice, Megan Sikora, Michael X. Martin, Michael McCormick, and John Bolton reprising the roles they played in Los Angeles, as well as new cast member Ernie Sabella. The musical garnered eight Tony Award nominations, with Hyde Pierce winning the award for Best Performance by a Leading Actor in a Musical. Curtains closed on June 29, 2008, after 511 performances and twenty-three previews.

The musical received mixed reviews on Broadway, with Ben Brantley writing in The New York Times: "David Hyde Pierce...steps into full-fledged Broadway stardom with his performance here...Perhaps this switching of creative horses accounts for the enervation that seems to underlie the lavish expenditure of energy by a top-of-the line cast that includes Debra Monk, Karen Ziemba and Jason Danieley. Brightly packaged, with Kiss Me, Kate-style sets by Anna Louizos and costumes to match by the industrious William Ivey Long, Curtains lies on the stage like a promisingly gaudy string of firecrackers, waiting in vain for that vital, necessary spark to set it off."

Clive Barnes wrote in the New York Post: "Part of the trouble was director Scott Ellis' failure to italicize sufficiently the inside comedy, but there probably was not much he could do. The choreography by Rob Ashford was unnoticeable, the scenery by Anna Louizos uninterestingly ugly, while William Ivey Long unwisely saved his best and funniest costumes for the curtain calls. Through all this farrago, Hyde Pierce moved (or, in that curtain call, "rode") with unshatterable aplomb - taking the basically comic concept of a tough plainclothes detective as a musical comedy queen, and running with it just as far, and even a bit beyond, as the material could take it.

== Synopsis ==
=== Act I ===
In 1959, a new musical called "Robbin' Hood!", a western version of Robin Hood, is in the midst of its preview performances at the Colonial Theatre in Boston, Massachusetts. During the closing number of one of the performances, Madame Marian, played by faded film star diva Jessica Cranshaw, looks on as Rob Hood, played by Bobby Pepper, wins a sharp-shooting contest and proposes to Miss Nancy, a schoolmarm, played by Niki Harris. The cast then sings the finale of the show, during which it is clear that Jessica can neither sing, dance, nor act ("Wide Open Spaces"). She takes her bow and, after receiving two bouquets, collapses behind the curtain.

Later that night, Carmen Bernstein, the show's hard-bitten co-producer, divorced songwriting team Aaron Fox and Georgia Hendricks, and the show's financial backer, Oscar Shapiro, read the reviews, most of which are terrible, especially the Boston Globe's, which is the review they needed to make it to Broadway. The group wonders how anyone could be so heartless to become a critic ("What Kind of Man?"). The show's flamboyant English director, Christopher Belling, arrives, and says that he had an epiphany about how to fix the show after walking into a church. Just then, stage manager Johnny Harmon tells Carmen that there is a phone call for her. Carmen suspects that it's her philandering husband, Sidney Bernstein, the show's theatrical promoter. Meanwhile, Aaron argues with Georgia about the reason she joined the show, as he believes that she only wanted to rekindle a romance with the show's leading man, Bobby. Belling asks Georgia to sing Madame Marian's opening number. Everyone is pessimistic, but she does so spectacularly, and it is clear that she is thinking about her failed marriage with Aaron. Aaron begins to sing with her, but Bobby cuts him off and they finish the number together ("Thinking of Him").

Belling then announces his plan: they are going to replace Jessica. Niki, the actress who plays Miss Nancy, steps forward and says she would feel terrible taking over, but Belling goes on to say that he is actually casting Georgia as Madame Marian. Bambi Bernét, the show's featured dancer, steps forward and says that Niki should get the role, but Belling sees right through her: Bambi is Niki's understudy, meaning if Niki got the lead, she'd get to play Miss Nancy. Georgia is cast, in spite of Aaron's disapproval. Carmen then enters and tells everyone that it was the hospital that had called and confirms that Jessica has died. The cast performs a brief ceremony, and it is clear that no one is sorry to see their leading lady die ("The Woman's Dead").

Lieutenant Frank Cioffi of the Boston Police Department then arrives to announce that he is there to investigate foul play in Jessica's death, as he reveals her death was caused by cyanide poisoning. Cioffi tells Belling to finish up his cast meeting before Cioffi begins questioning. The ensemble tries to leave, saying that they want to quit the show, but Carmen tries to convince them that the show must go on, though various members of the cast stand up to her, including Bambi, who is actually named Elaine and is in fact Carmen's daughter. Cioffi, an amateur performer himself, enthusiastically convinces them to do the show, and helps them realize how lucky they are to be actors and actresses ("Show People"). Thanks to the newfound energy and commitment, Carmen decides to treat everyone to a drink at the local bar. However, since Jessica was poisoned in the last ten minutes of the show and never left the stage thereafter, Cioffi believes that she must have been murdered by a member of the company, and he enforces a lockdown on the building and will not let anyone leave. Sidney, Carmen's husband, then arrives after flying in from New York, and Cioffi begins to suspect him, although Sidney claims to have been with a certain woman whose name he refuses to give.

Cioffi is left alone with the winsome Niki, who is now the understudy for Georgia. The lieutenant is struck by Niki's charm and confides in her about his investigation and his lonely life, as he feels as if he's married to his job ("Coffee Shop Nights"). She seems to return his affection, so he hopes she is not the murderer. The next day, Georgia attempts to learn a dance from the show, but is failing miserably despite Bobby's constant belief in her. Daryl Grady, the critic who wrote the terrible review for the Boston Globe, arrives at the theatre. Cioffi asks him how he got inside and Daryl points out that, as a member of the press, he's exempt from the building's quarantine. It is revealed that Carmen and Sidney called him in to request a re-review the show with Georgia as the new lead, and Daryl agrees to re-review the show, the following night, to which they reluctantly agree. In his original review, Daryl only praised the choreography and Niki's performance. Niki tries to thank Daryl for his kind words about her, however he tells her that he does not associate with the artists he reviews, and leaves after having a brief argument with Cioffi about his previous review.

Bobby, Belling, and Georgia enter, enraged with the fact that they have so little time to prepare for a review. Belling works to re-stage a difficult production number, featuring Niki, Georgia and Bambi ("In the Same Boat #1"). Cioffi suggests that the song needs to be rewritten, and he is left alone with Aaron, who shows Cioffi the process for composing a song. After he lets it slip that he misses Georgia, Aaron confesses that he still loves her and would like to reconcile ("I Miss the Music"). Georgia and the cast then hold a dress rehearsal of the big saloon hall number ("Thataway!"). Georgia pulls it off spectacularly and everyone finally believes they have a shot of putting on a great show. Cioffi and tells the cast that he has figured out that Sidney has been blackmailing every member of the show into working for him. Belling then interrupts and requests to re-work the ending pose of the song. While the curtain is closing, Sidney Bernstein is simultaneously rung up, with the curtain rope tied around his neck.

=== Act II ===
Sasha, the conductor, turns to the audience to reveal that Sidney's hanging was fatal ("The Man is Dead"). A makeshift dormitory has been set up on the stage of the still-sequestered Colonial Theatre. Each member of the company grows more paranoid by the hour, and often suspects the others during various periods of the night ("He Did It"). Cioffi returns from the coroner's office and tells everyone that Sidney was knocked out before being tied to the rope, so everyone is still a suspect, but his focus is more on whether the show will be ready for its re-opening. Niki then finds a death threat for Sidney, stating he will die unless he closes the show. Oscar reveals Sidney died for nothing as he was going to comply, going so far as to giving back last checks he made out. Carmen takes them back, saying she is going to keep the show open. Aaron previews his new version of "In the Same Boat", now featuring Bobby, Randy, and Harv ("In the Same Boat #2"), though Cioffi is still unsatisfied with the product.

Bambi asks that a pas de deux be added for herself and Bobby during the show's square dance number. Carmen agrees, but she insist that she is no stage mother, as her duty has always been to the box office ("It's a Business"). Daryl Grady then comes in and tells everyone that he's taking interviews from the cast in the Green Room. At the rehearsal of the re-staged square dance number, Bambi and Bobby are doing incredibly well, and everyone is impressed, however, towards the end of the number, Bobby is shot, and left wounded in the arm ("Kansasland"). Through use of angles, Cioffi is quick to figure out that Carmen was actually the target of the shot, not Bobby. Niki comes forward with the gun, and the company immediately jumps to the conclusion that she is guilty ("She Did It (Reprise)"). She says that she innocently found the gun backstage and hands it over, albeit after she accidentally pulls the trigger and almost kills Cioffi.

Cioffi gathers Aaron, Georgia, and Bobby and tells them that Sidney had no blackmail material on them, and yet they were still content working for such low pay. Georgia then quotes a death threat which Cioffi had not read out loud, leading Cioffi to arrest her when Aaron attempts to takes the blame for her, reviving their romance ("Thinking of Him/I Miss the Music (Reprise)"). Cioffi reveals that it was all an act, and that Bobby had only been pretending to be Georgia's boyfriend so that she could stir something back up in Aaron. She leaves, and Bobby confesses that he does love Georgia, and that he would do anything for her, even commit murder.

Niki laments how love makes people feel bad, but Cioffi begins flirting with her and reminisces about the first time he saw her on stage, leading them into an elaborate fantasy sequence, in which they daydream about being a couple in a musical ("A Tough Act to Follow"). He then confronts Niki about a coded memo in Sidney's blackmail book, as there was a black zero next to her name. Johnny tells Cioffi that he knows the secret, but refuses to tell Cioffi what it is. He is then shot while alone onstage. He tears out a page from his notebook reading "Drop in Planet Earth", and then bleeds out ("In the Same Boat #3").

Cioffi takes Niki and Belling up to the theatre's catwalk high above the stage. While searching for messages on the back of the drops, he announces that he's solved the mystery. Left alone, he is hit with a sandbag and is sent tumbling down. He narrowly escapes death by clutching onto a prop, which lowers him to safety. When on the ground, he exclaims that he has solved it... he finally knows how to stage "In the Same Boat". Putting together all three versions, the cast is able to sing an incredible, show stopping number ("In The Same Boat- Complete").

With the number completed, Cioffi tells Niki he has a plan to solve the murder. Cioffi announces over the theatre PA system that he and Niki are engaged, before asking the cast to re-stage the bows, when Jessica was murdered (“Wide Open Spaces”(reprise)). The cast quickly notices that Georgia is only being offered one bouquet, rather than two like on opening night. Cioffi figures out that the murderer hid a pellet gun with a cyanide capsule inside a bouquet, disguised as an usher, and killed Jessica. Bobby suddenly comes on stage with a bloody head and collapses, and everyone realizes that the masked Rob Hood standing on stage is a fake.

Cioffi then announces that the zero and the "Drop in Planet Earth" both represented a globe: The Boston Globe. He finally solves the case: the murderer is the Boston Globe critic, Daryl Grady. Daryl then takes off the mask and holds a knife to Niki's throat, threatening to kill her so that Cioffi cannot marry her. He reveals that he is in love with Niki and did not want her to move, so he decided he would do anything to stop the show from going on to Broadway. He demands that Cioffi give him his gun on his holster, to which he complies, though when Daryl tries to shoot Cioffi, it is revealed that the gun was not loaded. Cioffi takes another gun from his jacket, and officially arrests Daryl. Carmen pulls the trapdoor, leading Daryl to fall below the stage. Cioffi's colleague, Detective O'Farrell, takes him into custody and the cast of the production is relieved that the murder is finally solved.

Cioffi privately confronts Carmen, and she admits that she killed Sidney. Carmen has been secretly acting on behalf of Bambi, belittling Bambi in public so nobody would know how much support she was actually putting into Bambi's career, while pretending to be unsupportive so Bambi would have to work to get ahead rather than rely on nepotism. She wants her daughter to move on to Broadway, but Sidney was going to close the show. Cioffi agrees to wait until after the show's Broadway opening to turn her in, and tells her that, with the right lawyer, she could easily be acquitted of what is surely justifiable homicide. Carmen tells Cioffi that while his duty may be to the police, his heart will always be onstage, and that he will always be one of them ("Show People (Reprise)"). Belling comes on and notifies them that with Bobby's injury, he will not be able to perform that night.

Finally, the show reopens. Georgia is now Madame Marian ("Wide Open Spaces Finale"), Cioffi has replaced Bobby as Rob Hood, and "Tough Act to Follow" has become the new finale of the show. Cioffi proposes to Niki during the show's final scene, to which she accepts, and the stage becomes a celebration ("A Tough Act to Follow (Reprise)").

== Characters ==
- Lieutenant Frank Cioffi: The central character, a local Boston detective who is also very interested in musical theatre. Aside from being exceptionally good at his job, he has also aspired to be a musical theatre performer. He falls in love with Niki and they get engaged.
- Niki Harris: Pretty, naïve ingénue. Niki is playing a supporting role and is Jessica Cranshaw's understudy in the show-within-the-show during its Boston tryout. She is eager to make her Broadway debut. She meets and falls in love with Detective Frank Cioffi, who is investigating Jessica's murder at the theatre.
- Georgia Hendricks: Female half of songwriting team. Ends up taking on the leading lady role of the show-within-the-show.
- Carmen Bernstein: The show's brassy producer, unhappily married to Sidney Bernstein, and Bambi's estranged mother. Highly comical role with a belt voice. Carmen had always belittled Bambi in public, but for a nice reason.
- Aaron Fox: The composer of the show-within-the-show. His songwriting partner, Georgia, is also his ex-wife from whom he's separated, but still loves
- Bobby Pepper: The choreographer and male star of the show within the show. A handsome Gene Kelly type who is the one shining star in an otherwise dire show. He is Aaron's charming rival and the current boyfriend of Georgia. A strong singer and even stronger dancer.
- Christopher Belling: English director. Camp and funny.
- Bambi Bernét: Performer in the chorus and daughter of Carmen, the lead producer. Hungry to work her way up to leading performer; she has a contentious relationship with her mother, who insists on calling her by her real name, Elaine. She changed her name to Bambi because in the Disney movie, hunters kill Bambi's mother.
- Daryl Grady: A theatre critic for the local Boston newspaper, the Boston Globe. He enjoys using the power he has to make or break shows during their out-of-town tryouts.
- Johnny Harmon: The Stage Manager of the show-within-the-show. Johnny is gruff but lovable. He keeps the company in line and on their toes throughout the rehearsal process.
- Oscar Shapiro: The general manager and sole investor. An agreeable if slightly gruff man. He is always looking for any angle to find money.
- Sidney Bernstein: The co-producer of an out of town flop. Sidney is tough and self-serving.
- Jessica Cranshaw: Fading Hollywood star. A diva, who has no right to be one; she is a terrible singer, dancer and actress who stars in the show within a show and is murdered on its opening night.
- Sasha Iljinsky: The European conductor of the show within the show; played by the orchestra's actual conductor.
- Randy Dexter: One of the male ensemble actors of the show within the show.
- Harv Fremont: One of the male ensemble actors of the show within the show, Randy's sidekick.
- Detective O'Farrell: Cioffi's associate from the Boston Police Department, assists in the investigation.

== Original casts ==
Character	Original Broadway Cast	Original UK Cast
Lieutenant Frank Cioffi	David Hyde Pierce	Jason Manford
Niki Harris	Jill Paice	Leah Barbara West
Carmen Bernstein	Debra Monk	Rebecca Lock
Georgia Hendricks	Karen Ziemba	Carley Stenson
Aaron Fox	Jason Danieley	Ore Oduba; Andy Coxon
Christopher Belling	Edward Hibbert	Samuel Holmes
Bobby Pepper	Noah Racey	Alan Burkitt
Bambi Bernét	Megan Sikora	Emma Caffrey
Oscar Shapiro	Michael McCormick	Martin Callaghan; Cory English
Johnny Harmon	Michael X. Martin	Minal Patel
Daryl Grady	John Bolton	Adam Rhys-Charles
Sidney Bernstein	Ernie Sabella	Mark Sangster
Jessica Cranshaw	Patty Goble	Nia Jermin
Detective O'Farrell	Kevin Bernard	Thomas Lee-Kid
Randy	Jim Newman	J.R. Ballantyne
Harv	Matt Farnsworth	Samuel John-Humphreys

== Other productions ==
=== United States ===
A U.S. tour of Curtains was scheduled to start in a limited engagement beginning in March 2010, according to Avid Touring Group.

The New England premiere of Curtains opened August 13, 2010, for five shows only, at the Haskell Opera House in Derby Line, Vermont/Stanstead, Quebec. The show was performed by QNEK Productions, the resident theatre company at the Haskell Opera House.

=== International ===
The first European production opened in Visby, Sweden in April 2009. Produced and directed by Sofia Ahlin Schwanbohm, the cast featured Fredrik Wahlgren (Lt. Frank Cioffi), Clara Strauch (Carmen Bernstein), Ingrid Zerpe as (Georgia Hendricks), and Vilhelm Blomgren as (Aaron Fox).

The Australian premiere of Curtains was held on February 12, 2010, at Spotlight Theatre on the Gold Coast, and ran for four weeks.

The first UK performance of Curtains was given at the Kenneth More Theatre, Ilford, on March 11, 2010. The first UK Professional production of the show was at the Landor Theatre in London. The show opened to previews on July 25, 2012, before opening officially on July 30, 2012. The show ran until September 1. The production received positive reviews with Paul Vale from the Stage writing, "this is a traditional musical comedy that despite some minor flaws, throws out plenty of laugh out loud one-liners and some great tunes" The Scottish Premiere was performed by the Southern Light Opera Company in the Royal Lyceum Theatre, Edinburgh on 15 to 19 May 2012.

The New Zealand premiere of Curtains was performed at Porirua Little Theatre, Wellington, on April 8, 2010, and the musical ran for four weeks.

The Irish premiere of Curtains was performed by 'Clara Musical Society' to mark their 40th year. The performances ran April 5 to 9, 2011, at The GAA social Centre, River Street, Clara, Co. Offaly.

The Czech premiere was at Musical theatre Karlin (Hudební divadlo Karlín) on September 22, 2011, opening to mostly positive reviews. The creative team included director Antonín Procházka, translator Adam Novák, designers Michalea Hořejší and Aleš Valášek and choreographer Pavel Strouhal.

The German premiere was at the Landestheater Coburg on November 5, 2011.

The Canadian premiere was performed by No Strings Theatre Company with a run from July 26 to 29, 2012, at The Al Green Theatre in Toronto.

In 2016, The Production Company mounted a professional production staged at the Melbourne Arts Centre in Australia. The cast included Simon Gleeson as Frank Cioffi, Alinta Chidzey as Niki Harris, Colin Lane as Christopher Belling, Lucy Maunder and Alex Rathgeber as Georgia Hendricks and Aaron Fox, and John Wood as Sidney Bernstein.

A UK tour began at the Churchill Theatre, Bromley in October 2019 starring Jason Manford as Frank Cioffi, Carley Stenson as Georgia Hendricks, Ore Oduba (alternating venues with Andy Coxon) as Aaron Fox and Rebecca Lock as Carmen Bernstein and directed by Paul Foster. The production transferred to the Wyndham's Theatre in London's West End featuring the touring cast (with the exception of Oduba being replaced by Coxon as Aaron Fox, and Cory English as Oscar Shapiro from December 13 to 22) from December 13, 2019, until January 13, 2020, before resuming the UK tour until spring 2020. However, due to the COVID-19 pandemic, the tour finished early at the Leicester Haymarket Theatre in March 2020. A recording was live streamed online on April 14, 2020, filmed during the tour in October 2019 at the Palace Theatre, Manchester, with profits of the live stream going to the Funds For Freelancers charity.

== Songs ==
Act I

- Overture – Orchestra
- Wide Open Spaces – Bobby, Jessica Cranshaw, Randy, Niki, Ensemble
- What Kind of Man? – Carmen, Oscar, Aaron, Georgia
- Thinking of Him – Georgia, Aaron, Bobby
- The Woman's Dead – Georgia, Aaron, Niki, Bobby, Belling, Johnny, Bambi, Oscar, Carmen, Company
- Show People – Carmen, Cioffi, Georgia, Aaron, Oscar, Belling, Bobby, Company
- Coffee Shop Nights – Cioffi
- Georgia Can't Dance — Georgia and Ensemble
- In the Same Boat #1 – Georgia, Niki, Bambi
- I Miss the Music – Aaron
- Thataway! – Georgia, Bobby and Ensemble

Act II

- The Man is Dead – Sasha
- He Did It – Bobby, Georgia, Niki, Aaron, Belling, Oscar, Ensemble
- In the Same Boat #2 – Bobby, Randy, Harv
- It's a Business – Carmen, Male Ensemble
- Kansasland – Randy, Harv, Bambi, Bobby, Ensemble
- She Did It (Reprise) – Company
- Thinking of Him/I Miss The Music (Reprise) – Aaron and Georgia
- A Tough Act to Follow – Cioffi, Niki and Ensemble
- In the Same Boat #3 – Company
- In the Same Boat Completed – Georgia, Niki, Bambi, Bobby, Randy, Harv, Cioffi, Ensemble
- Wide Open Spaces (Reprise) — Ensemble
- Show People (Reprise) – Cioffi and Carmen
- Wide Open Spaces (Finale) – Ensemble
- A Tough Act to Follow (Reprise) – Company

== Awards and nominations ==
=== Original Broadway Production ===
Year	Award	Category	Nominee	Result
2007	Tony Award	Best Musical		Nominated
2007	Tony Award	Best Book of a Musical	Rupert Holmes and Peter Stone	Nominated
2007	Tony Award	Best Original Score	John Kander, Fred Ebb and Rupert Holmes	Nominated
2007	Tony Award	Best Performance by a Leading Actor in a Musical	David Hyde Pierce	Won
2007	Tony Award	Best Performance by a Leading Actress in a Musical	Debra Monk	Nominated
2007	Tony Award	Best Performance by a Featured Actress in a Musical	Karen Ziemba	Nominated
2007	Tony Award	Best Direction of a Musical	Scott Ellis	Nominated
2007	Tony Award	Best Choreography	Rob Ashford	Nominated
2007	Drama Desk Award	Outstanding Musical		Nominated
2007	Drama Desk Award	Outstanding Book of a Musical	Rupert Holmes and Peter Stone	Won
2007	Drama Desk Award	Outstanding Actor in a Musical	David Hyde Pierce	Nominated
2007	Drama Desk Award	Outstanding Featured Actress in a Musical	Debra Monk	Won
2007	Drama Desk Award	Outstanding Featured Actress in a Musical	Karen Ziemba	Nominated
2007	Drama Desk Award	Outstanding Orchestrations	William David Brohn	Nominated
2007	Drama Desk Award	Outstanding Music	John Kander	Nominated
2007	Drama Desk Award	Outstanding Lyrics	Fred Ebb	Nominated
2007	Drama Desk Award	Outstanding Set Design	Anna Louizos	Nominated
2007	Drama Desk Award	Outstanding Costume Design	William Ivey Long	Nominated
