= The Lightning Thief (musical) =

2014 musical

- The Percy Jackson Musical
- Off-Broadway promotional poster
- Music: Rob Rokicki
- Lyrics: Rob Rokicki
- Book: Joe Tracz
- Basis: The Lightning Thief by Rick Riordan
- Premiere: July 21, 2014: Lucille Lortel Theatre, New York City
- Productions: 2014 Off-Broadway; 2015 First US tour 2017 Off-Broadway revival 2019 Second US tour 2019 Broadway; 2024 London; 2025 UK Tour

The Lightning Thief is a musical with music and lyrics by Rob Rokicki and a book by Joe Tracz, based on the 2005 novel of the same name by Rick Riordan. In the musical, Percy Jackson - a teenage boy who discovers that he is a demigod - goes on a quest to find Zeus's missing lightning bolt to prevent a war between the Greek gods.

== Background ==
The musical was initially introduced in New York City Off-Broadway at the Lucille Lortel Theatre by Theatreworks USA in 2014 as a one-hour musical, part of its free theatre series, and went on to a national tour. A new version, with a new score and an updated, expanded script was produced with previews from March 23, 2017, and an official opening on April 4 and a last performance on May 6 at the Lucille Lortel Theatre. This production had a new cast, except for Kristin Stokes as Annabeth Chase. The show began a national tour in Chicago in 2019.

The Lightning Thief then played a 16-week limited run on Broadway, beginning previews September 20 and opened on October 16 at the Longacre Theatre, with the national tour cast reprising their roles. The musical closed on Broadway on January 5, 2020, and a national tour was scheduled to begin in late 2020.

The musical premiered in the UK on March 16, 2022, in a production by a theatre group at the University of Leeds.

It has also been adapted to a Japanese version, premiering in Tokyo on September 19, 2022.

The musical opened at The Other Palace in London on November 23, 2024. It closed on 15th June 2025, and a UK tour started on August 15th at the Theatre Royal Windsor. This production has some slight differences to the Broadway version. The younger-leaning characters (like Percy himself) were aged up to be 16, rather than 12 like in the original book; the second act now opens with the song "Try", sung by Percy, Annabeth and Grover; Clarisse has a less antagonistic role after her introduction, with her own verse in "The Campfire Song", replacing Katie Gardener's.

== Synopsis ==
=== Act 1 ===
Percy Jackson, a teenage boy with ADHD and dyslexia, is on a field trip to the New York Metropolitan Museum of Art. While there, his substitute pre-algebra teacher, Mrs. Dodds, asks to speak with him. Once alone, Mrs. Dodds transforms into a Fury, a mythological Greek demon of Hades. Thanks to a pen that transforms into a sword named Riptide, thrown to Percy by his Latin teacher, Mr. Brunner, Percy manages to fend off and vaporize Mrs. Dodds. After this incident Percy is expelled from his school on the grounds that he failed to stay with the group while being on probation. When Percy tries to explain what happened, he is shocked to find that neither Mr. Brunner, his best friend Grover Underwood, nor anyone else remembers Mrs. Dodds ("Prologue/The Day I Got Expelled"). Percy says goodbye to them and heads home for summer vacation.

Back at his apartment, his mother, Sally Jackson, seems to understand and even forgive Percy's expulsion, while her husband, Gabe Ugliano, does not. “Smelly” Gabe abuses Percy, and Sally confesses she needs to tell him about his father, who left before Percy was born. Percy, extremely bitter about his father and upset with himself for being expelled yet again, regrets his actions and becomes increasingly hard on himself. Sally assures Percy the quirks and abnormalities of someone are what make them special ("Strong"). Sally takes Percy to the beach where she met Percy's father, and the two run into Grover. Percy is shocked when he learns that Grover is a satyr.

Suddenly, a Minotaur (half-bull, half-man) attacks the trio. Sally sacrifices herself so that Percy and Grover can make it to a place she calls "camp". Percy kills the minotaur to avenge his mother but is kicked in the head and falls unconscious. He dreams of a man in a Hawaiian shirt, who gives him a seashell, claiming, "What belongs to the sea can always return to the sea" ("The Minotaur/The Weirdest Dream").

When Percy awakens, he finds himself in a place called Camp Half-Blood. The shell the strange man in his dream gifted him remains in his pocket. The camp director, Mr. D (who is actually Dionysus, god of wine and madness), reluctantly explains to Percy that he is a demigod, the son of a human and a Greek god ("Another Terrible Day"). Mr. Brunner (who is really Chiron, an immortal centaur), is also at the camp and explains to Percy that the gods will send a sign to claim him. However, Percy is still skeptical and angry that his father has never shown any sign of interest in him at all. Luke Castellan, the son of Hermes, sympathizes with Percy, telling him that many half-bloods never know their godly parents, as they are not claimed ("Their Sign").

Percy settles in and meets several other campers such as Silena Beauregard (a daughter of Aphrodite), Katie Gardner (a daughter of Demeter), Clarisse La Rue (a daughter of Ares, who immediately dislikes Percy), and Annabeth Chase (a daughter of Athena, who took care of Percy while he was unconscious). Annabeth quickly takes the helm as leader during a game of capture the flag, instructing Percy to sit and wait in the boys' bathroom so he won't "mess things up". Clarisse singles him out and tries to "pulverize" him, but the toilets unexpectedly burst and soak her ("Put You in Your Place"). After things settle down, the campers sit around a campfire and vent about their unsteady, and in some cases harmful, relationships with both their godly and mortal parents ("The Campfire Song").

Percy is claimed as the son of Poseidon, god of the sea, and it is at once rumored that Zeus' lightning bolt has been stolen, and Percy is the culprit. Percy is told he and two others must go on a quest to retrieve the bolt to prevent a war between the gods. He is also sent to receive a prophecy from the Oracle of Delphi ("The Oracle"). After the Oracle's prophecy, Percy is upset that he has to leave Camp Half-Blood for a quest that will be unsuccessful ("Good Kid"). Percy only accepts the quest because Luke hints that his mother will be in the Underworld - the location of the search - since Hades is now rumored to be the real thief. Annabeth and Grover force themselves into the quest, and after a pair of winged shoes is given to them by Luke, the three are thrust into the woods with little care and protection ("Killer Quest!").

=== Act 2 ===
Percy, Annabeth, and Grover escape a bus which was attacked by the three Furies. Just after blowing it up, they become hopelessly lost ("Lost!"). In a frantic decision, Percy suggests they should enter Aunty Em's Garden Gnome Emporium. The strange Auntie Em wants to take pictures of them, but she is revealed to be Medusa. Percy cuts off her head with his pen/sword Riptide, and, as a joke, sends the head by mail to the gods. Annabeth seems particularly upset with this run-in, so while Grover scouts out their surroundings, Percy questions her about it. She confesses that she has always been ignored by everyone around her, and is desperate for a chance to prove herself to Athena, her mother, and make the history books ("My Grand Plan").

Grover returns with train tickets to St. Louis and they set off, encountering many dangers along the way such as a Chimera, nasty storms, and the Lotus Hotel and Casino. They also meet up with Ares, who gives them a lift to Nevada ("Drive"). While on a bus ride to Los Angeles, Percy has a dream of a man speaking with someone whom he refers to as "my lord". The powerful voice mentions sacrifices and brings up a name: Thalia ("The Weirdest Dream Reprise"). Percy wakes with a jolt and asks Grover if he has ever heard of someone named Thalia. Grover confesses that a few years ago he was sent to escort Luke, Annabeth, and Thalia Grace - Zeus's daughter - to camp. On the way there they were attacked, and Grover failed to save Thalia, who, sacrificing herself, was turned into the tree that protects the borders of Camp Half-Blood. Grover holds himself responsible and thinks Percy must be ashamed of him ("The Tree on the Hill"). Percy assures Grover that no matter who he is or what he does, Percy will always want him as a friend. Percy brings up that the Oracle said that he would fail the quest, but he, Grover, and Annabeth all reaffirm their devotion to one another ("Try (Reprise)").

The trio arrive in the Underworld, where they are given a tour of the horrors by Charon and several long-dead musicians ("DOA"). Percy realizes that the lightning bolt is hidden in his backpack, and the three work out how it could have gotten there. Percy is nearly dragged into Tartarus by the shoes Luke gave him, and the group is discovered. After a brief conversation with an innocent Hades, Percy withdraws the shell from his pocket and blows it, realizing it was from Poseidon. It opens a portal out of the Underworld. Vowing to return to save his mother, Percy, Annabeth, and Grover escape. Percy hypothesizes that Ares is the one who planted the bolt in his bag, and comes to terms with himself and his father. He declares himself a son of Poseidon, and with his powers over water and the help of Annabeth and Grover he beats Ares ("Son of Poseidon").

The trio return to the camp as heroes, but Percy couldn't be more troubled. He confides in Luke that he feels just as confused as before, and Luke tells him that he also felt that way after his own quest. Luke tells Percy that he is the lightning thief, and that he has teamed up with Kronos to get back at the gods, who he feels have done him wrong ("The Last Day of Summer"). Luke attacks Percy and flees. Percy declares that there will be a war, no matter how they try to stall it, but he and his friends will be prepared and do whatever it takes to fight it ("Bring on the Monsters").

== Principal roles and original cast ==
Character	Off-Broadway	First US Tour	Off-Broadway Revival	Broadway	Off-West End	UK Tour
Character	2014	2015	2017	2019	2024	2025
Percy Jackson	Eric Meyers	Troy Iwata	Chris McCarrell	Chris McCarrell	Max Harwood	Vasco Emauz
Annabeth Chase	Kristin Stokes	Rebecca Duckworth	Kristin Stokes	Kristin Stokes	Jessica Lee	Kayna Montecillo
Grover Underwood	Jordan Stanley	Jon Friestedt	George Salazar	Jorrel Javier	Scott Folan	Cahir O'Neill
Mr. D (Dionysus)	Parker Drown	Matt Hill	George Salazar	Jorrel Javier	Joe Allen	Aidan Cutler
Gabe	Parker Drown	Matt Hill	James Hayden Rodriguez	James Hayden Rodriguez	Joe Allen	Aidan Cutler
Luke Castellan & Ares	Parker Drown	Matt Hill	James Hayden Rodriguez	James Hayden Rodriguez	Joaquin Pedro Valdes	Paolo Micallef
Mrs. Dodds & Clarisse La Rue & Katie Gardner	Zakiya Young	Allison Hunt	Sarah Beth Pfeifer	Sarah Beth Pfeifer	Samantha Mbolekwa	Ellie-Grace Cousins
Sally Jackson & Oracle & Silena Buregard	Zakiya Young	Allison Hunt	Carrie Compere	Jalynn Steele	Paisley Billings	Simone Robinson
Charon	Graham Stevens	Dean Linnard	Carrie Compere	Jalynn Steele	Paisley Billings	Simone Robinson
Medusa	Graham Stevens	Dean Linnard	Jonathan Raviv	Ryan Knowles	Paisley Billings	Simone Robinson
Mr. Brunner/Chiron, Poseidon, & Hades	Graham Stevens	Dean Linnard	Jonathan Raviv	Ryan Knowles	Greg Barnett	Niall Sheehy

=== Notable replacements ===
==== UK Tour ====
- Mr. D (Dionysus): Danny Beard

== Musical numbers ==
Original Off-Broadway / First US Tour

- "Prologue/The Day I Got Expelled" – Percy, Mr. Brunner, Mrs. Dodds, Grover, and Company
- "Strong" – Sally and Percy
- "The Minotaur/The Weirdest Dream" – Percy, Sally, Grover, and Company
- "Their Sign" – Chiron, Percy, and Luke
- "Put You in Your Place" – Clarisse, Annabeth, Percy, and Company
- "The Oracle" – Oracle and Ensemble
- "Killer Quest!" – Percy, Grover, Annabeth, and Company
- "The Tree on the Hill" – Grover, Thalia, Annabeth, Luke, Percy, and Company
- "In the Same Boat" – Grover, Annabeth, Percy, Ares, and Charon
- "Put You in Your Place" (Reprise) – Ares
- "The Last Day of Summer" (Part 1) – Percy, Annabeth, Grover, Luke, and Company
- "Good Weird" - Percy and Annabeth
- "The Last Day of Summer" (Part 2) – Percy, Annabeth, Grover, and Company
- "The Day I Got Expelled" (Reprise) – Percy and Company

Off-Broadway revival / Second US Tour / Original Broadway

Act 1

- "Prologue/The Day I Got Expelled" – Percy, Mr. Brunner, Mrs. Dodds, Grover, and Company
- "Strong" – Sally and Percy
- "The Minotaur/The Weirdest Dream" – Percy, Sally, Grover, and Company
- "Another Terrible Day" – Mr. D, Percy, Chiron, Silena, and Katie
- "Their Sign" – Chiron, Percy, and Luke
- "Put You in Your Place" – Clarisse, Annabeth, Percy and Company
- "The Campfire Song" – Luke, Annabeth, Percy, Grover, Katie, Silena, and Chiron
- "The Oracle" – Oracle and Ensemble
- "Good Kid" – Percy and Company
- "Killer Quest!" – Percy, Grover, Annabeth, and Company

Act 2

- "Lost!” – Percy, Annabeth and Grover
- "My Grand Plan" – Annabeth
- "Drive" – Grover, Annabeth, Percy, Ares, and Company
- "The Weirdest Dream" (Reprise) – Percy, Kronos, and Luke
- "The Tree on the Hill" – Grover, Thalia, Annabeth, Luke, Percy, and Company
- "D.O.A." – Charon and Company
- "Son of Poseidon" – Percy, Ares, Annabeth, Grover, Sally, and Company
- "The Last Day of Summer" – Percy, Luke, Annabeth, and Company
- "Bring on the Monsters" – Percy, Annabeth, Grover, Clarisse, Chiron, Silena, and Luke

London

Act 1

- "Prologue/The Day I Got Expelled" – Percy, Mr. Brunner, Mrs. Dodds, Grover, and Company
- "Strong" – Sally and Percy
- "The Minotaur/The Weirdest Dream" – Percy, Sally, Grover, and Company
- "Another Terrible Day" – Mr. D, Percy, Chiron, Silena, and Katie
- "Their Sign" – Chiron, Percy, and Luke
- "Put You in Your Place" – Clarisse, Annabeth, Percy and Company
- "The Campfire Song" – Luke, Annabeth, Percy, Grover, Clarisse, Silena, and Chiron
- "The Oracle" – Oracle and Ensemble
- "Good Kid" – Percy and Company
- "Killer Quest!" – Percy, Grover, Annabeth, and Company

Act 2

- "Try” – Percy, Annabeth and Grover
- "Lost!” – Percy, Annabeth and Grover
- "My Grand Plan" – Annabeth
- "Drive" – Grover, Annabeth, Percy, Ares, and Company
- "The Weirdest Dream" (Reprise) – Percy, Kronos, and Luke
- "The Tree on the Hill" – Grover, Thalia, Annabeth, Luke, Percy, and Company
- "Try (Reprise)” – Percy, Annabeth and Grover
- "D.O.A." – Charon and Company
- "Son of Poseidon" – Percy, Ares, Annabeth, Grover, Sally, and Company
- "The Last Day of Summer" – Percy, Luke, Annabeth, and Company
- "Bring on the Monsters" – Percy, Annabeth, Grover, Clarisse, Chiron, Silena, and Luke

=== Recordings ===
The off-Broadway original cast album was released on July 7, 2017. For a limited-time, Broadway Records offered a special package that included an official Lightning Thief T-shirt in addition to a physical copy of the cast album.

A deluxe version of the off-Broadway original cast album was released on December 6, 2019. The album contains 5 cut songs sung by members of the Broadway cast. A karaoke album was released on the same day, containing the songs "Good Kid", "Killer Quest!", "My Grand Plan", "The Tree On The Hill", and "Bring On The Monsters".

The original London cast recording was released digitally on November 7, 2025, and in CD format on December 5. It includes previously cut material that was re-added to the London production, and around 15 minutes of never-before-recorded material.

== Critical response ==
The Lightning Thief: The Percy Jackson Musical received positive reviews from critics off-Broadway. Fern Siegel, for The Huffington Post, praised the musical for its dialogue, story and cast, calling it "a reminder that Off-Broadway is an important venue for musicals", while Raven Snook, for Time Out, describe it as "worthy of the gods".

Frank Scheck, in reviewing the production for The Hollywood Reporter, wrote that the musical "proves far more enjoyable than the misbegotten 2010 film version or its 2013 sequel" and "also provides an excellent if irreverent introduction to Greek mythology that just might persuade some kids to dig deeper."

The national tour received mostly positive reviews. Chris Jones, of The Chicago Tribune, wrote "the lively pop score has a distinct forward drive, a nice amount of musical diversity and a few terrific balladic showcases for the two top-drawer actor-singers in the show".

The show opened on Broadway to widely negative reviews. Jesse Green, the co-chief theater critic for The New York Times, wrote, "it is both overblown and underproduced, filled with sentiments it can't support and effects it can't pull off". He criticized the show as having "all the charm of a tension headache".

In its limited run at the University of Leeds the musical garnered positive reviews. Particular praise was given to the leads and strong direction and choreography.

Rick Riordan admitted in 2017 that he had not seen the production himself, but was supportive of it based on fan feedback.

== Awards and nominations ==
Year	Award	Category	Nominee	Result
2015	Lucille Lortel Award	Outstanding Musical		Nominated
2015	Off Broadway Alliance	Best Family Show		Nominated
2017	Drama Desk Award	Outstanding Musical		Nominated
2017	Drama Desk Award	Outstanding Book of a Musical	Joe Tracz	Nominated
2017	Drama Desk Award	Outstanding Featured Actor in a Musical	George Salazar	Nominated
