= John Bolton (actor) =

American theater and film actor (born 1965)

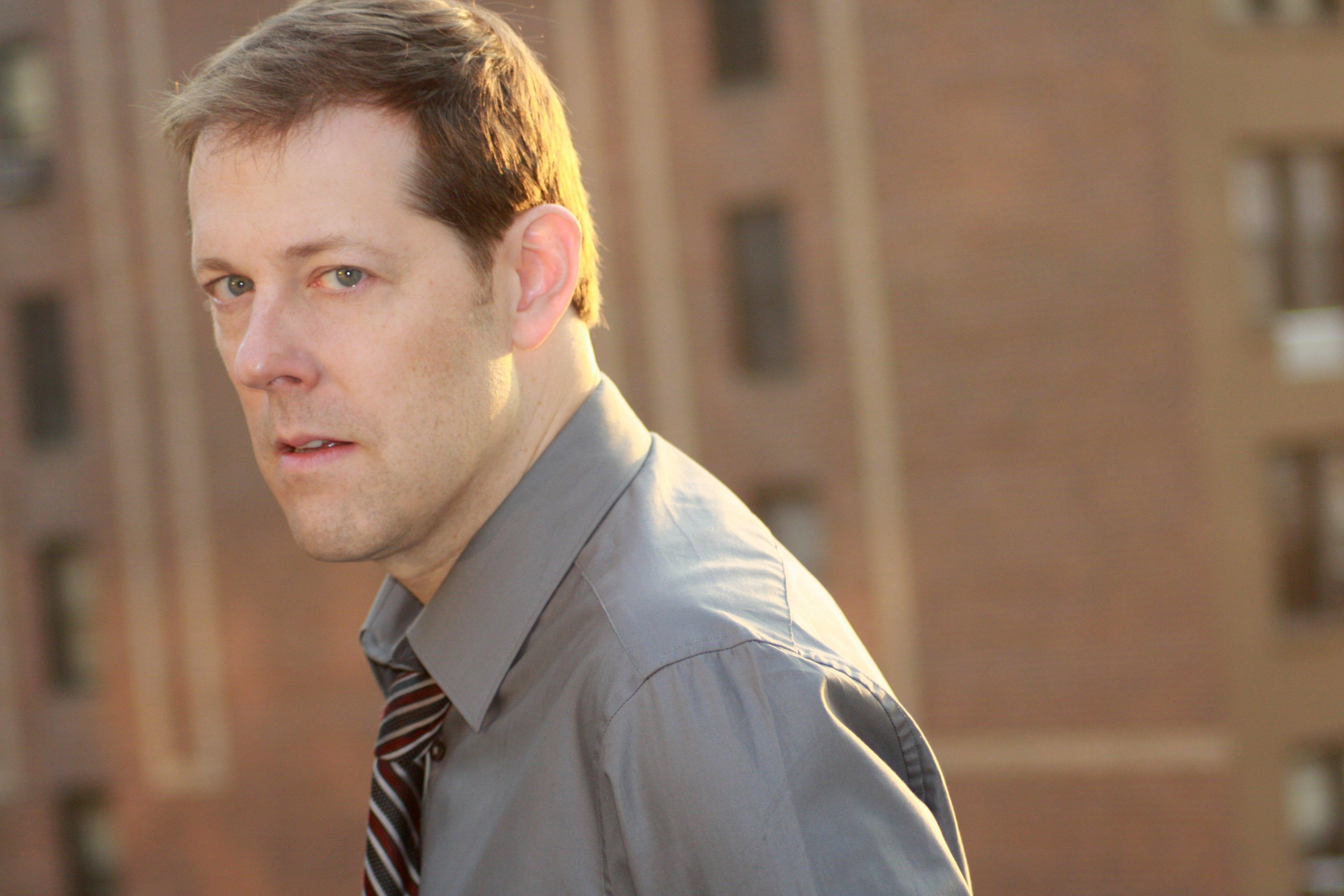
- Born: December 29, 1965 (age 60); Rochester, New York
- Occupation: Actor

John Bolton (born December 29, 1965) is an American actor and Broadway regular. Bolton is most notable for originating the role of "The Old Man" (Mr. Parker) in the Broadway show A Christmas Story: The Musical. He created the role of Vlad Popov in the Broadway musical Anastasia.

== Career ==
Bolton originated the role of "The Old Man" (Mr. Parker) in A Christmas Story: The Musical on Broadway, running from November 19, 2012, to December 30, 2012, and repeated this starring role in Boston, Hartford and in December 2013 at Madison Square Garden.

He appeared in the Broadway revival of Dames at Sea, starring as The Captain/Hennesey. The musical ran from October 22, 2015, to January 3, 2016.

His other theatre credits include many Broadway musicals that have won the Tony Award including original productions of Curtains with David Hyde Pierce; Spamalot with Tim Curry, David Hyde Pierce, and Sara Ramirez, directed by Mike Nichols; Contact directed by Susan Stroman; and Titanic; and revivals of Damn Yankees and How to Succeed in Business with Matthew Broderick, with Bolton eventually playing the role of Finch opposite Sarah Jessica Parker.

A sought-after cabaret performer, Bolton has also appeared in many concert performances including Downton Abbey at 54 Below (2013), Titanic reunion at Lincoln Center Avery Fisher Hall (2014), and Guys and Dolls (2014) and the Family Holiday Concert with the New York Pops at Carnegie Hall. The New York Times called his performance in Guys and Dolls a "stand-out." Bolton is a regular soloist with the New York Pops, and he has headlined three sold-out concerts at Carnegie Hall. He performed in the concert series "Broadway in the Boros" at the Queens' Socrates Sculpture Park on July 21, 2017.

He has performed in television shows and many TV commercials. Most recently he was seen on Elementary, Madam Secretary and Unbreakable Kimmy Schmidt. He played the recurring character D.A. John Summerhill on the soap opera All My Children in 2006. He also appeared in "Loose Lips", a 2014 episode of Blue Bloods, and "Vacancy", a 2006 episode of Law & Order: Criminal Intent; and he played Bruce Caplan on the television series Gossip Girl. Bolton has also made guest star appearances as Carl Switzer on the HBO television series Boardwalk Empire, and as Jason Doyle on the television series The Good Wife. He also appeared in the third season of Submissions Only and the short Russian Broadway Shut Down.

He is an adjunct professor at Pace University, teaching acting.

== Personal life ==
He was born in Rochester, New York and grew up in LeRoy, New York.

== Major theatre credits ==
=== Broadway ===
Sources: Broadwayworld, IBDB

- Anastasia, Broadhurst Theatre 2017-2019 as Vlad Popov
- Dames at Sea, Helen Hayes Theatre 2015 as the Captain/Hennesey
- A Christmas Story: The Musical, 2012 as the Old Man
- Curtains, 2007-2008 as Daryl Grady
- Spamalot, 2005–2006 (Tony Award for Best Musical) as King Arthur
- Contact, 2000–2002 (Tony Award for Best Musical) as Michael Wiley
- Titanic, 1997–1999 (Tony Award for Best Musical) as Charles Clarke
- How to Succeed in Business Without Really Trying, 1995–1996 as J. Pierrepont Finch
- Damn Yankees, 1994–1995 as Lo-Tone/Announcer/Ozzie

=== Touring ===
- Wicked (2022–2023), US National Tour as the Wizard of Oz
- Hello, Dolly! (2019–2020), US National Tour as Horace Vandergelder

=== Off-Broadway ===
Source: Broadwayworld

- Pageant: The Musical, 2014
- The Last Smoker in America, 2012
- Five Course Love, 2005

=== Other ===
- Hairspray at The Muny (2026) as Wilbur Turnblad
- Elf the Musical at Bucks County Playhouse (2025–2026) as Walter Hobbs
- Come from Away at The Muny (2025) as Nick
- Anastasia at David Geffen Hall (2025) as Vlad Popov
- Young Frankenstein at the Ogunquit Playhouse (2021) as Frederick Frankenstein
- How to Succeed in Business Without Really Trying at the Kennedy Center (2018) as Mr. Bert Bratt
- Anastasia at Hartford Stage (2016) as Vlad Popov
- Show Boat at the San Francisco Opera directed by Francesca Zambello with Bill Irwin, Harriet Harris, and Patricia Racette (2014)
- Guys and Dolls at Carnegie Hall (2014) as Angie the Ox
- Young Frankenstein at the Ogunquit Playhouse (2013) as Frederick Frankenstein
- Anywhere I Wander: The Frank Loesser Songbook, 2012 concert debut with the New York Philharmonic
- Same Time, Next Year with Eve Plumb, September 2011 at the Surflight Theatre, Beach Haven, NJ
- A Christmas Story: The Musical, Seattle, 5th Avenue Theatre (2010); 5 City National Tour (2011)
- The Music Man, May - June 2011, Geva Theatre Center, Rochester, New York as Harold Hill
- Einstein's Dreams, 2009, Benefit Concert, Symphony Space, New York City
- It's Only Life, revue by John Bucchino, Samuel Beckett Theatre, New York City, July to August 2004
- Señor Discretion Himself, April - May, 2004, Arena Stage (Washington, DC)
- The Opposite of Sex, October 2004, Magic Theatre, San Francisco

== Filmography ==
Source: TV Guide

- Chicken House 2025 (short film): Frank
- Madam Secretary 2017 (TV series): Attorney General Nolan, episode "Convergence"
- Elementary 2017 (TV series): Mr. Charles, episode "Be My Guest"
- Unbreakable Kimmy Schmidt 2015 (TV series): Bus Driver
- Blue Bloods 2014 (TV series): Tom Pincus, episode "Loose Lips"
- The Good Wife 2011 (TV series): Jason Doyle, episode "Get a Room"
- Boardwalk Empire (2011) (TV series): Carl Switzer
- Gossip Girl (2012) (TV series): Bruce Caplan, episodes "Where the Vile Things Are" and "Con Heir"
- The Savages (2007 film): Man in Mall Lot
- Law & Order: Criminal Intent (2006) (TV series), episode: "Vacancy"
- All My Children (2006 season): D.A. John Summerhill
- As the World Turns (1996) (TV series): Malcolm Twist

== Awards ==
- 2017 Outer Critics Circle Award Best Featured Actor in a Musical (Anastasia) (nominee)
- 2017 Rivera Award (formerly Astaire Award) Outstanding Male Dancer in a Broadway Show (Anastasia) (nominee)
- 2016 Astaire Award nomination, Outstanding Ensemble In A Broadway Show Dames at Sea
- 2016 Connecticut Critics Circle nomination - Best Featured Actor in a Musical Anastasia
- 2014 IRNE Award (Independent Reviewers of New England) nomination for Best Visiting Performer in A Christmas Story: The Musical
- Named one of The Boston Globe Top Ten Performance of the year for A Christmas Story: The Musical
- 58th Annual Drama Desk (2013) Nomination for Best Featured Actor in A Christmas Story: The Musical
- 2012 Footlight Award for Best Actor from the Seattle Times for A Christmas Story: The Musical
- 2008 City Spirit Award in Rochester, New York
- 2004 BAT (Bay Area Theatre) nomination for The Opposite of Sex
