= Rob Rokicki =

American musical theatre writer

- Born: Robert Rokicki; Denver, Colorado, U.S.
- Occupations: Composer, lyricist, musician, music director, actor
- Instrument: Melodica
- Years active: 2003–present
- Website: www.robrokicki.com
- Education: University of Michigan BA in English, BFA in Musical Theatre

Rob Rokicki is an American composer, lyricist, and musician. He is best known for writing the music and lyrics to the Broadway musical The Lightning Thief.

== Career ==
Rokicki graduated from the University of Michigan with a BA in English and a BFA in musical theater. Rokicki wrote the music and lyrics for the Broadway musical The Lightning Thief: The Percy Jackson Musical (book by Joe Tracz), which debuted at the Lucille Lortel Theatre by Theatreworks USA in 2014 and opened on Broadway at the Longacre Theatre in 2019.

Rokicki performed the orchestrations and co-arrangements for the jukebox musical Punk Rock Girl (book and co-arrangements by Joe Iconis). The show features songs from female-fronted bands, including Blondie, Avril Lavigne, Pat Benetar, No Doubt, and Pink. Rokicki created some song mashups for the musical that debuted in 2022 at The Argyle Theatre in Babylon Village, NY.

A recording of Rokicki’s graphic novel musical Monstersongs was released by Broadway Records in 2017. Rokicki cowrote the song "Footprints" with friend and collaborator Joe Iconis and the album features a number of performers, including Megan Hilty, Katrina Rose Dideriksen, and Jelani Alladin. Reviewers called Monstersongs "a delightfully clever, fun, catchy album" and "the mature distillation of many years’ creativity". It is being developed as a virtual reality video game.

LOVE, NY, a musical co-written with Mike Ruby, won the 2009 American Harmony Award and has been presented at New World Stages, Curtain Call Kweskin Theatre in Connecticut, and Oklahoma University. 11:11 (formerly known as Relativity), also co-created with Ruby, was first presented at Feinstein's/54 Below in 2014 and selected for development at the University of Southern California School of Dramatic Arts in 2018. Together, they also wrote Strange Tails, which was presented at several festivals between 2010 and 2012.

Rokicki wrote the music and lyrics for Experience Marianas, a dark rock musical, which had an eight-week workshop presentation at Cap21/Molloy College in 2019. He co-wrote the book with Sarah Beth Pfiefer following two years of research about cults

As a music director, Rokicki was involved in the New York premiere of Departure Lounge, directed by Christopher Gattelli, at The Public Theater. He also served as music director on Joe Iconis' ReWrite at The Goodspeed Opera; Hairspray at the John W. Engeman Theater; The Best Little Whorehouse in Texas at TriArts at Sharon Playhouse; among others.

As an actor, Rokicki performed in the Evita 25th Anniversary national tour and a tour of Miss Saigon. He was featured in a concert of South Pacific at Carnegie Hall that was recorded for television. He has a number of Off-Broadway and regional theater credits, including parts in productions of Beauty & the Beast and Thoroughly Modern Millie.

== Works ==
Theatre

- The Lightning Thief: The Percy Jackson Musical (2015)

Music

- I’m Ready: The Songs of Rob Rokicki (2012)
- The Lightning Thief: The Percy Jackson Musical Original Cast Recording (2017)
- Monstersongs (2017)
- Smart Girls EP (2019)
- True Believer (Songs from Experience Marianas) EP (2021)

== Awards ==
- 2015 Lucille Lortel Award nomination for The Lightning Thief for Outstanding Musical
- 2015 Off-Broadway Alliance nomination for The Lightning Thief for Best Family Show
- 2017 Drama Desk Award nomination for The Lightning Thief for Outstanding Musical
