= Chris McCarrell =

American actor and singer

- Born: January 9, 1991 (age 35); Cleveland, Ohio
- Other names: Chris-mas Carol, Chrizz McCarrell
- Education: Baldwin Wallace Conservatory of Music
- Occupations: Actor, Singer, Artist
- Years active: 2013–present

Chris McCarrell (born January 9, 1991) is an American theater and television actor and singer. He is best known for portraying Marius Pontmercy in the Broadway revival of Les Misérables, and for originating the titular character in The Lightning Thief: The Percy Jackson Musical in its Off-Broadway premiere, 2019 tour, and Broadway production.

== Early life and education ==
McCarrell grew up in Aurora, Ohio. His mother, DeAnna McCarrell, worked as a guidance counselor in Aurora City Schools, and his father, Bernie McCarrell, a wood shop teacher in Ravenna, Ohio.

McCarrell attended University School, an all boys private high school in Hunting Valley, OH. Shortly before his freshman year, McCarrell attended a party for the retiring headmaster, where alumni in the performing arts came and performed. On the ride home, he told his parents he wanted to be a musical theatre major, and cites that as the night he knew he wanted to act.

After high school, McCarrell attended Baldwin Wallace Conservatory of Music where he was a musical theatre major. While at Baldwin Wallace, he performed in many university shows, including Wild Party (Phil), Pippin (Lewis), Rent (Mark), Titanic (J. Bruce Ismay), Sweeney Todd (Anthony), and Next to Normal (Gabe Goodman). He graduated in 2013.

== Career ==
Soon after graduating, McCarrell began acting professionally in regional productions of shows, including the lead roles in Summer of '42 and the original production of Bubble Boy.

Later in 2013, McCarrell was cast in a concert of 35MM. The show was on October 7, 2013, at 54 Below and the cast included many Broadway stars such as Lauren Pritchard (Spring Awakening), Lesli Margherita (Matilda), and Zachary Levi (First Date), among others.

McCarrell went on to audition for the 2014 Broadway Revival of Les Misérables, originally reading for the role of Marius Pontmercy. However, a few months after his original reading, he was called back to audition for one of the other students, Joly. McCarrell was then hired to perform as Joly, as well as understudy the role of Marius. During the same year, McCarrell was cast as Lost Boy Nibs in the NBC television special, Peter Pan Live! which aired on December 4, 2014.

After a brief rehearsal period, McCarrell officially replaced cast member Andy Mientus in Les Misérables on March 3, 2015, and performed as Marius at the Imperial Theatre until the show's closing on September 4, 2016.

On June 1, 2015, McCarrell performed a sold-out solo concert at 54 Below, and appeared there again on December 7, 2015 in "Christmas Carols with Chris McCarrell".

Following the end of Les Misérables, McCarrell performed as the titular character in The Lightning Thief: The Percy Jackson Musical, which ran from March 23, 2017, to May 6, 2017, at the Lucille Lortel Theatre. On August 28, 2017, he reprised his role as Percy in a sold-out The Lightning Thief musical concert at The Green Room 42. In late 2019 to early 2020, he played Percy in the Broadway run of The Lightning Thief.

== Theatre ==
Year	Production	Role	Category	Theatre	Notes
2013	Next to Normal	Gabe	Regional	Beck Center for the Performing Arts	March 1 to April 21, 2013
2013	Summer of '42	Hermie	Regional	Bucks County Playhouse	July 25, 2013 – August 11, 2013
2013	Bubble Boy	Jimmy	Regional	Hamilton Stage	November 6, 2013 – November 24, 2013
2014–2015	Les Misérables	Joly / Fauchelevent u/s Marius	Broadway	Imperial Theatre	March 1, 2014 – February 15, 2015
2015–2016	Les Misérables	Marius Pontmercy	Broadway	Imperial Theatre	March 3, 2015 – September 4, 2016
2017	The Lightning Thief	Percy Jackson	Off-Broadway	Lucille Lortel Theatre	March 23, 2017 – May 6, 2017
2018	Sweeney Todd: The Demon Barber of Fleet Street	Anthony Hope	Regional	KC Repertory Theatre	March 30, 2018 – April 16, 2018
2019	The Lightning Thief	Percy Jackson	US Tour	Various	January 4, 2019 – July 28, 2019
2019	The Lightning Thief	Percy Jackson	Broadway	Longacre Theatre	September 20, 2019 – January 4, 2020
2023	Joseph and the Amazing Technicolor Dreamcoat	Joseph	Regional	La Mirada Theatre for the Performing Arts	June 2–25, 2023
2023	Natasha, Pierre & The Great Comet of 1812	Anatole Kuragin	Regional	Great Lakes Theater	September 22 - October 8, 2023
2024	Prelude to a Kiss	Peter Hoskins	Regional	South Coast Repertory	April 11, 2024 - May 5, 2024
2024	Prelude to a Kiss	Peter Hoskins	Regional	Milwaukee Repertory Theater	September 10 – October 19, 2024
2025	Rent	Roger Davis	Regional	The Cape Playhouse	June 25 - July 12, 2025

== Filmography ==
Year	Title	Role	Type	Notes
2014	Peter Pan Live!	Lost Boy Nibs	Television	Live Broadcast (December 4, 2014)
