= Prelude to a Kiss (musical) =

2024 stage musical based on the play of the same name by Craig Lucas

- Music: Daniel Messé
- Lyrics: Sean Hartley; Daniel Messé
- Book: Craig Lucas
- Basis: Prelude to a Kiss (play); By: Craig Lucas
- Productions: 2024 South Coast Rep

Prelude to a Kiss is a stage musical with a book by Craig Lucas, based on his play of the same name that was a runner-up for the Pulitzer Prize for Drama in 1991. The show has music by Daniel Messé with lyrics by Messé and Sean Hartley. Lucas and Messé had previously worked together on the musical Amélie.

== Production history ==
=== Southcoast Rep (2024) ===
In 2020, the musical was announced as part of South Coast Repertory's 2020–2021 season, with a premiere date of May 15, 2021. The original play had also premiered at South Coast Repertory in 1988. Due to the COVID-19 pandemic, the show was postponed. On April 11, 2024, the show had its world premiere. The show had been commissioned in 2016 by South Coast Rep Artistic Director David Ivers who also serves as director, and was developed in partnership with Milwaukee Repertory Theater and the John D. Lewis Play Development Program. Choreography was done by Julia Rhoades with musical direction and orchestrations by Wiley DeWeese.

=== Milwaukee Rep (2024) ===
The show opened Milwaukee Repertory Theater's 2024/25 Season and ran at the Sharon L. Wilson Theatre Center from September 10 through October 20, 2024 following the South Coast premiere with the same cast.

== Casts ==
Character	2024	
Character	South Coast Repertory	Milwaukee Repertory Theater
Rita	Hannah Corneau	Caitlin Houlahan
Peter	Chris McCarrell	Chris McCarrell
Julius	Jonathan Daly	Jonathan Daly
Leah	Julie Garnyé	Julie Garnyé
Taylor	Jimmie "J.J." Jeter	Andrew Montgomery Coleman
Angie	DeAnne Stewart	Keirsten Hodgens
Rita's Mom	Karen Ziemba	Karen Ziemba
Rita's Dad	James Moye	James Moye

== Musical numbers ==
Act I

- "A Little Light" - Rita, Peter, Taylor, Company
- "The Room Where She Doesn't Sleep" - Peter
- "I Haven't Slept in Years" - Rita
- "Love in the Age of Anxiety" - Rita, Peter, Company
- "Whatever My Little Girl Wants" - Rita, Peter, Rita's Mom, Rita's Dad
- "Cold Feet" - Rita, Peter
- "Drink Up / The Wedding" - Rita, Peter, Company
- "Beautiful" - Rita
- "Living With a Stranger" - Rita, Peter
- "Never Really There* - Rita, Peter, Company

Act II

- "Happy Wife, Happy Life/Entropy" - Peter, Rita's Dad, Rita's Mom
- "In The Movies" - Peter, Taylor, Company
- "A New Life" - Rita, Peter
- "A Map of Us" - Peter, Angie, Company
- "The Man He Used to Be" - Leah
- "This Body" - Peter, Julius
- "Not Me" - Rita, Julius
- "Finale" - Rita, Peter, Julius, Company
