= Karen Ziemba =

American actress, singer and dancer (born 1957)

- Born: November 12, 1957 (age 69); St. Joseph, Michigan, U.S.
- Education: University of Akron
- Occupations: Actress, singer, dancer
- Years active: 1980s-present
- Spouse: Bill Tatum (m. 1984)
- Awards: Tony Award for Best Performance by a Featured Actress in a Musical; 2000 Contact
- Website: www.karenziemba.com

Karen Ziemba (born November 12, 1957) is an American actress, singer and dancer, best known for her work in musical theatre. In 2000, she won the Tony Award for Best Featured Actress in a Musical for her performance in Contact.

== Biography ==
Ziemba was born on November 12, 1957, in St. Joseph, Michigan. She attended the University of Akron (Ohio), where she studied dance. In 1977 she danced with the Ohio Ballet.

Her Broadway debut was in A Chorus Line as Diana Morales. Later, she played the lead of Peggy Sawyer in 42nd Street. While appearing in 42nd Street, she was featured in the October 1984 issue of Playboy in the article "Babes of Broadway", in which she posed partially nude. Ziemba's other Broadway roles include Polly Baker in Crazy for You in 1992 (replacement), Roxie Hart in Chicago (1998), and Belle Hagner in Teddy & Alice (1987).

Ziemba appeared Off-Broadway in the Kander and Ebb revue And The World Goes 'Round (1991) and won the Drama Desk Award. She received a Drama Desk Award nomination (Best Actress in a Musical) for I Do! I Do! (1996). The next year, she was nominated for the 1997 Drama Desk Award (Outstanding Actress in a Musical) and a 1997 Tony Award (Actress in a Musical) for her role in Steel Pier (1997).

In 2000, Ziemba won the Tony Award for Best Featured Actress in a Musical for her performance in Susan Stroman's Contact. She played the role of "the timid, abused mafioso's wife." The CurtainUp reviewer wrote of the savvy casting "...especially Karen Ziemba, who is finally in a show that makes full use of her dual talents as an actress and dancer...Ziemba (in Did You Move?), brings an amazing female Walter Mitty vulnerability to a frustrated wife having dinner with a husband..."

She appeared in Much Ado About Nothing as Beatrice at the Hartford Stage (Connecticut) and then the Shakespeare Theatre Company (Washington, DC) in November 2002 through January 5, 2003. In 2004 she received another Tony Award nomination (Best Featured Actress in a Musical) for Never Gonna Dance. In 2007, she portrayed the heartwarming lyricist Georgia Hendricks in Curtains, earning her fourth Tony Award nomination.

She performed with the New York City Opera in 110 in the Shade as Lizzie in 1992. The AP News reviewer wrote: "Ziemba's voice is clear and sweet, exactly what's needed for a song like Is It Really Me?." She performed the role of Cleo in the City Opera's production of The Most Happy Fella in 1991. The New York Times reviewer wrote: "...her voice had swagger, grainy brashness and brassy energy, undistracted by higher ambitions."

She has appeared in several New York City Center Encores! staged musicals, including The Pajama Game in 2002 (Babe Williams), Bye Bye Birdie in 2004 and On Your Toes in 2013 (Lil Dolan).

She starred in the staged reading of Vincent Crapelli's Otherwise, with Beth Leavel and Laura Bonarrigo-Koffman.

Ziemba appeared as Dolly Gallagher Levi in Hello, Dolly! at the Drury Lane Theatre, Oak Brook, Illinois, in 2013.

She returned to Broadway in March 2014, in the new musical adaptation of Woody Allen's Bullets Over Broadway as the character "Eden Brent", directed by Susan Stroman.

In 2015 and 2017 Karen returned to Off-Broadway to play the role of "Mom/Eileen" in Kid Victory.

On television, she has appeared on Law & Order and on film in The Producers and the ill-fated remake of The Devil and Daniel Webster first released as Shortcut to Happiness.

In 2020, Ziemba appeared as Barbara Joblove in the musical podcast, Propaganda! In 2024, Ziemba starred in the world premiere production of Prelude to a Kiss as Rita's Mom, alongside Chris McCarrell and Caitlin Houlahan. She reprised the role later that year at Milwaukee Repertory Theater.

In 2024, Ziemba sang and danced the original Michael Bennett choreography of “Who’s That Woman?” in the Transport Group’s concert presentation of Follies at Carnegie Hall. She reprised the role of Dolly Gallagher Levi in June 2025 in Broadway at Music Circus’ production of Hello, Dolly!

== Personal life ==
She and actor Bill Tatum wed in 1984.

== Stage ==
Year	Title	Role	Venue	Ref.
1975	A Chorus Line	Bebe/Hilary	Shubert Theatre, Broadway	
1984	42nd Street	Peggy Sawyer	Majestic Theatre, Broadway	
1987	Teddy & Alice	Belle Hagner	Minskoff Theatre, Broadway	
1991	And the World Goes 'Round	Performer	Westside Theatre, Off-Broadway	
1992	110 in the Shade	Lizzie	New York City Opera	
1995	Crazy for You	Polly Baker	Shubert Theatre, Broadway	
1996	I Do! I Do!	Agnes	Lamb's Theatre, Off-Broadway	
1996	Chicago	Roxie Hart	Ambassador Theatre, Broadway	
1997	Steel Pier	Couple #39/Rita Racine	Richard Rodgers Theatre, Broadway	
1999	Contact	Wife	Mitzi E. Newhouse Theatre, Off-Broadway	
2000	Contact	Wife	Vivian Beaumont Theatre, Broadway	
2001	Never Gonna Dance	Mabel Pritt	Broadhurst Theatre, Broadway	
2002	The Pajama Game	Babe Williams	New York City Center, Off-Broadway	
2002	Much Ado About Nothing	Beatrice	Hartford Stage, Regional	
2002	Much Ado About Nothing	Beatrice	Shakespeare Theatre Company	
2003	The Threepenny Opera	Jenny	Williamstown Theatre Festival, Regional	
2003	The Dinner Party	Mariette	Oldcastle Theatre Company, Regional	
2004	Guys and Dolls	Miss Adelaide	Paper Mill Playhouse, Regional	
2004	Bye Bye Birdie	Rose Grant	New York City Center, Off-Broadway	
2007	Curtains	Georgia Hendricks	Al Hirschfeld Theatre, Broadway	
2012	Heresy	Performer	Flea Theatre, Off-Broadway	
2013	Hello, Dolly!	Dolly Gallagher Levi	Drury Lane Theatre, Regional	
2013	On Your Toes	Lil Dolan	New York City Center, Off-Broadway	
2014	Bullets Over Broadway	Eden Brent	St. James Theatre, Broadway	
2016	Gypsy	Mama Rose	Sharon Playhouse, Regional	
2016	Do I Hear a Waltz?	Signora Fioria	New York City Center, Off-Broadway	
2016	Native Gardens	Virginia Capanini Butley	Cincinnati Playhouse in the Park, Regional	
2016	Other People's Money	Bea	Long Wharf Theatre, Regional	
2017	Kid Victory	Mom/Eileen	Vineyard Theatre, Off-Broadway	
2017	The Traveling Lady	Performer	Cherry Lane Theatre, Off-Broadway	
2017	Prince of Broadway	Performer	Samuel J. Friedman Theatre, Broadway	
2018	Heartbreak House	Hesione Hushabye	Lion Theatre, Off-Broadway	
2018	Irving Berlin's White Christmas	Martha Watson	U.S. National Tour	
2019	Marie, Dancing Still	Martine Van Goethem	5th Avenue Theatre, Regional	
2019	Annie	Miss Hannigan	NC Theatre, Regional	
2024	Prelude to a Kiss	Rita's Mom	South Coast Repertory, Regional	
2024	Prelude to a Kiss	Rita's Mom	Milwaukee Repertory Theater, Regional	
2025	Hello, Dolly!	Dolly Gallagher Levi	Broadway Sacramento, Regional	
2025	Love, Loss, and What I Wore	Performer	Cape May Stage, Regional	
2025	Come from Away	Diane, Others	Milwaukee Repertory Theater, Regional	
2026	Monte Cristo	Carconte/Lucrezia Borgia	York Theatre Company, Off-Broadway	
2027	Paddington the Musical	Mrs. Bird	Al Hirschfeld Theatre, Broadway	

== Awards and nominations ==
Award	Year	Category	Work	Result	Ref.
Tony Awards	1997	Best Actress in a Musical	Steel Pier	Nominated	
Tony Awards	2000	Best Featured Actress in a Musical	Contact	Won	
Tony Awards	2004	Best Featured Actress in a Musical	Never Gonna Dance	Nominated	
Tony Awards	2007	Best Featured Actress in a Musical	Curtains	Nominated	
Drama Desk Awards	1991	Outstanding Featured Actress in a Musical	And the World Goes 'Round	Won	
Drama Desk Awards	1996	Outstanding Actress in a Musical	I Do! I Do!	Nominated	
Drama Desk Awards	1997	Outstanding Actress in a Musical	Steel Pier	Nominated	
Drama Desk Awards	2000	Outstanding Featured Actress in a Musical	Contact	Won	
Drama Desk Awards	2007	Outstanding Featured Actress in a Musical	Curtains	Nominated	
Outer Critics Circle Awards	1997	Outstanding Actress in a Musical	Steel Pier	Nominated	
Outer Critics Circle Awards	2000	Outstanding Featured Actress in a Musical	Contact	Won	
Outer Critics Circle Awards	2004	Outstanding Featured Actress in a Musical	Never Gonna Dance	Won	
Outer Critics Circle Awards	2007	Outstanding Featured Actress in a Musical	Curtains	Won	
Lucille Lortel Awards	2017	Outstanding Featured Actress in a Musical	Kid Victory	Nominated	
Astaire Awards	2014	Outstanding Female Dancer in a Broadway Show	Bullets Over Broadway	Nominated	
