= Tom Kitt (musician) =

American composer and musician

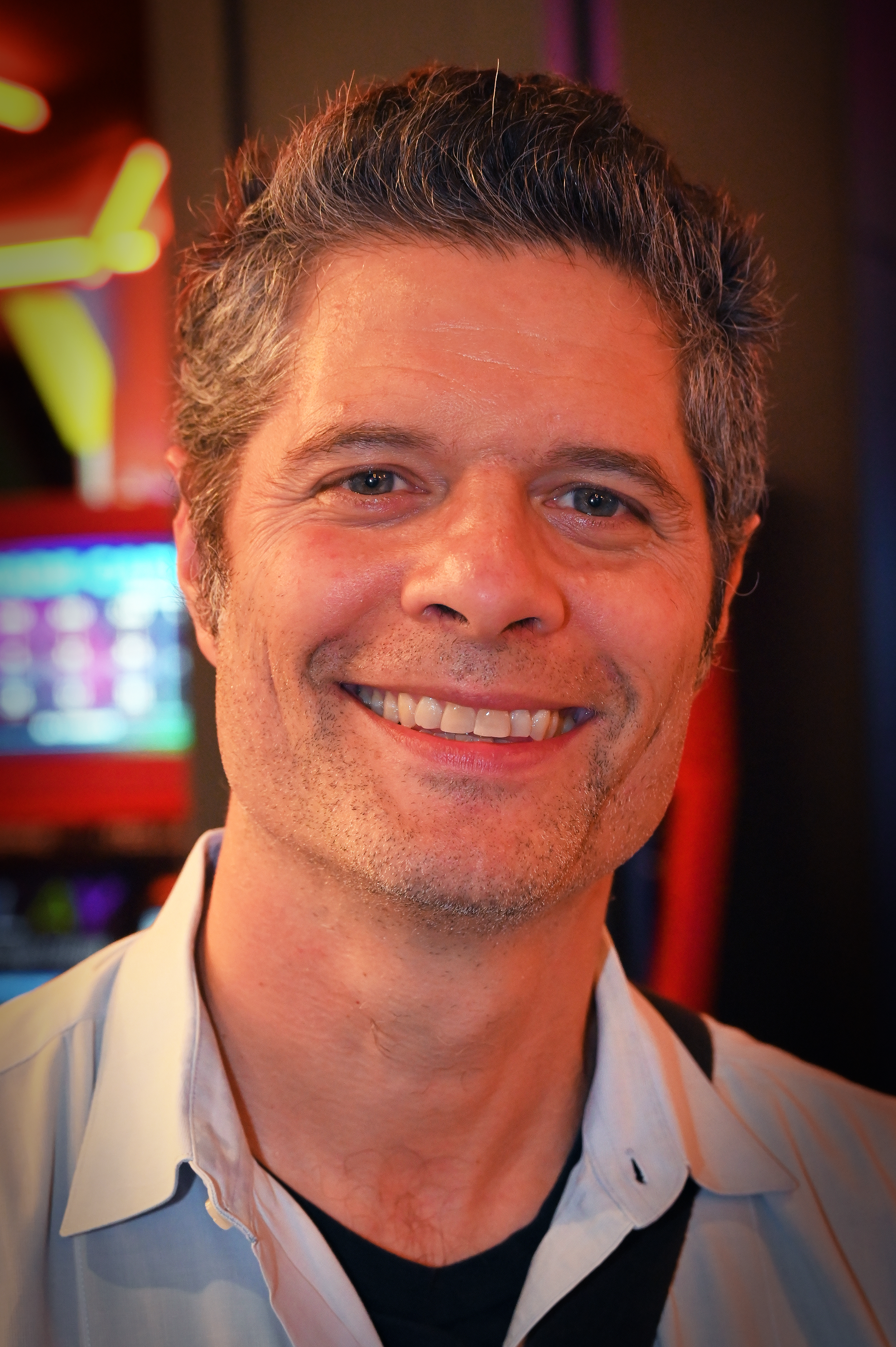
- Kitt in 2024
- Born: Thomas Robert Kitt
- Education: Columbia University (BA)
- Occupations: Composer, conductor, orchestrator, musician
- Spouse: Rita Pietropinto (m. 2000)
- Children: 3
- Awards: Pulitzer Prize for Drama; Tony Award; Outer Critics Circle Award; Primetime Emmy Award; Grammy Award

Thomas Robert Kitt is an American composer, conductor, orchestrator, and musician. For his score for the musical Next to Normal, he shared the 2010 Pulitzer Prize for Drama with Brian Yorkey. He has also won two Tony Awards and an Outer Critics Circle Award for Next to Normal, as well as Tony and Outer Critics Circle nominations for If/Then and SpongeBob SquarePants. He has been nominated for eight Drama Desk Awards, winning one, and he won two Grammy Awards for Best Musical Theater Album for Jagged Little Pill in 2021 and Hell's Kitchen in 2025.

== Early life ==
Kitt was raised in Port Washington, New York, on Long Island, until age 13, when his family moved to Bedford, New York, in Westchester County. He attended Byram Hills High School in neighboring Armonk, New York, where he participated in various theatrical productions. He graduated in 1992. As a youth he attended Interlochen Arts Camp. He then attended Columbia College, New York City, graduating with a degree in economics in 1996. During his time at Columbia, Kitt was also a member of the Columbia Kingsmen.

== Career ==
=== Arranger, orchestrator, music director, composer ===
Kitt began working on Off-Broadway in 2002, when he served as music director and conductor for Debbie Does Dallas: The Musical.

In 2006, he composed the music for High Fidelity, based on the Nick Hornby novel of the same name.

In 2008, Kitt teamed with Brian Yorkey to create Next to Normal, a show about mental illness in suburban America. The musical addressed issues such as suicide, drug abuse, and ethics in modern psychiatry. He had met Yorkey while studying at Columbia University, and they had attended the BMI Lehman Engel Musical Theatre Workshop as a team. Next to Normal was well received by critics. Kitt won the 2008 Outer Critics Circle Award, Outstanding New Score, and was nominated for the Drama Desk Award, Outstanding Music; and Tony Awards for Best Original Score Written for the Theatre and Best Orchestrations for the show. Kitt and Yorkey shared the 2010 Pulitzer Prize for Drama for Next to Normal. The Pulitzer Board called it "a powerful rock musical that grapples with mental illness in a suburban family and expands the scope of subject matter for musicals." Kitt received the 2009 Frederick Loewe Award for Dramatic Composition for Next to Normal from the Dramatists Guild of America.

Also in 2008, Kitt composed the music for the play From Up Here, which was also nominated for the 2008 Drama Desk Award, Best Play; and the Outer Critics Circle Award.

He was the music supervisor for the Sherie Rene Scott musical Everyday Rapture, which ran at Second Stage Theatre in 2009.

Kitt was the music supervisor, orchestrator and music arranger for the musical American Idiot, which opened on Broadway in March 2010.

Kitt composed the score for The Public Theater Shakespeare in the Park (New York City) production of The Winter's Tale, which ran in July 2010. The New York Times reviewer wrote that, "His score is a triumph of the less-is-more approach to incidental music."

In August 2010, Brian Yorkey and Kitt's musical In Your Eyes was workshopped at the Village Theatre's Festival of New Musicals in Issaquah, Washington.

Kitt's next musical, Bring It On, a musical adaption of the film, was a collaboration with Lin-Manuel Miranda, Amanda Green and playwright Jeff Whitty. The musical premiered at the Alliance Theatre, Atlanta, running from January 15, 2011 to February 20, 2011. Miranda later called Kitt "one of the best melodists of our generation," and attributed personal growth and education to their relationship.

In 2012, he worked on arranging strings sections for Green Day's album trilogy Uno, Dos and Tre.

He worked with Brian Yorkey on a new musical titled If/Then which was workshopped in 2013 in New York City with Idina Menzel in the lead role. Following the workshop, the show had an out-of-town tryout at Washington D.C.'s National Theatre, from November 5 to December 8, 2013. It opened on Broadway at the Richard Rodgers Theatre on March 4, 2014 in previews, officially on March 30, 2014. The show is directed by Michael Greif, produced by David Stone, and stars Menzel, LaChanze and Anthony Rapp. The choreography is by Larry Keigwin, sets are by Mark Wendland, and costumes by Emily Rebholz.

Kitt and Yorkey wrote a musical adaptation of the book (and films) Freaky Friday, with the book by Bridget Carpenter. The musical, developed by Disney Theatrical, began performances at the Signature Theatre, Arlington, Virginia on October 4, 2016. Directed by Christopher Ashley, with choreography by Sergio Trujillo, the cast featured Emma Hunton, Jason Gotay and Heidi Blickenstaff. The musical begins performances at the La Jolla Playhouse, San Diego on January 31, 2017 to March 12. Directed by Ashley, Hunton and Blickenstaff reprise their original roles.

Dave, a musical based on the 1993 movie Dave, premiered in July 2018 at the Arena Stage, Washington, DC, with lyrics by Nell Benjamin, a book by Benjamin and Thomas Meehan, and music by Kitt. Directed by Tina Landau, the cast featured Douglas Sills and Drew Gehling.

Superhero, a new musical by Kitt and John Logan, premiered Off-Broadway at Second Stage Theatre, with an official opening on February 28, 2019.

Kitt had reteamed with Brian Yorkey for a musical adaptation of Magic Mike, with Roberto Aguirre-Sacasa writing the book. By May 2019, the creative team of Kitt, Yorkey and Aguirre-Sacasa left the project and a developmental lab that had been scheduled for the week of May 3 was cancelled.

Kitt then composed the new musical titled Almost Famous, the world-premiere musical adaptation of Cameron Crowe's 2000 coming-of-age film Almost Famous. The musical opened September 27, 2019 at The Old Globe in San Diego, California.

Kitt and Yorkey worked on a stage adaptation of The Visitor. The musical premiered Off-Broadway at the Public Theater on October 16, 2021. The book is by Kwame Kwei-Armah and Brian Yorkey, choreography by Lorin Latarro with direction by Daniel J. Sullivan. David Hyde Pierce and Ahmad Maksoud starred.

Kitt is the composer of the musical titled Flying Over Sunset, which was expected to premiere in a Lincoln Center Theater production on Broadway on March 12, 2020 in previews. The book is by James Lapine, who is also the director, with the lyrics by Michael Korie. The show was postponed when Broadway shut down due to the COVID-19 pandemic. It was announced in May 2021 that the show would resume production on November 4, 2021 in previews, with the official opening on December 6, 2021.

Kitt has signed on to compose the upcoming Looney Tunes animated musical film, Bye Bye Bunny: A Looney Tunes Musical, with lyrics and screenplay by Ariel Dumas of The Late Show with Stephen Colbert.

=== Performance & The Tom Kitt Band ===
Kitt has performed his own songs in a one-man show at various venues such as the Bitter End in New York. He is the founder of The Tom Kitt Band, in which he plays piano. The band's first album is Find Me. Kitt also contributed in 2006 to Julia Murney's self-titled debut album, I'm Not Waiting, for which he co-wrote the song Perfect.

== Personal life ==
He married Rita Pietropinto in 2000. They have three children.

== Compositions ==
- High Fidelity (2006)
- From Up Here (2008, Manhattan Theatre Club)
- Next to Normal (2008)
- The Winter's Tale (2010), incidental music
- Bring It On (2011); music also by Lin-Manuel Miranda
- Orphans (2013)
- If/Then (2013)
- Cymbeline (2015, Shakespeare in the Park)
- Penny Dreadful (2016), composed the opening title for the show's season 3 finale
- Freaky Friday (2016)
- Grease: Live (2016), wrote two new songs with Brian Yorkey
- Dave (2018)
- Superhero (2019)
- Almost Famous (2019, Old Globe Theater)
- The Visitor (2021)
- Flying Over Sunset (2021)
- Bye Bye Bunny: A Looney Tunes Musical (TBA), provided music and orchestration

== Work as arranger, orchestrator, music director ==
- Debbie Does Dallas: The Musical (2002)
- Urban Cowboy (2003)
- Mario Cantone: Laugh Whore (2004)
- 13 (2008)
- Keys: The Music of Scott Alan (2008)
- 21st Century Breakdown, Green Day (2009)
- Everyday Rapture (2009, Second Stage Theatre, and 2010, Broadway)
- American Idiot: The Musical (2009, Berkeley Rep; 2010, Broadway)
- ¡Uno!, Green Day (2012)
- ¡Tré!, Green Day (2012)
- Pitch Perfect 2 (2015) - Vocal Arrangements
- SpongeBob SquarePants (2016)
- Head over Heels (2018)
- Jagged Little Pill (2018)
- Hell's Kitchen (2023)

== Awards and nominations ==
=== Tony Awards ===
Year	Category	Show	Result
2009	Best Original Score	Next to Normal	Won
2009	Best Orchestrations	Next to Normal	Won
2014	Best Original Score	If/Then	Nominated
2018	Best Orchestrations	SpongeBob SquarePants	Nominated
2020	Best Orchestrations	Jagged Little Pill	Nominated
2022	Best Original Score	Flying Over Sunset	Nominated
2023	Best Original Score	Almost Famous	Nominated
2024	Best Orchestrations	Hell's Kitchen	Nominated

=== Other awards ===
Year	Award	Category	Show	Result	Ref.
2008	Drama Desk Award	Outstanding Music	Next to Normal	Nominated	
2008	Outer Critics Circle Award	Outstanding New Score	Next to Normal	Nominated	
2010	Pulitzer Prize for Drama		Next to Normal	Won	
2010	Drama Desk Award	Outstanding Orchestrations	American Idiot	Nominated	
2010	Drama Desk Award	Outstanding Orchestrations	Everyday Rapture	Nominated	
2011	Drama Desk Award	Outstanding Music in a Play	The Winter's Tale	Nominated	
2012	Drama Desk Award	Outstanding Music in a Play	All's Well That Ends Well	Nominated	
2014	Primetime Emmy Awards	Outstanding Original Music and Lyrics	"Bigger!" (from 67th Tony Awards)	Won	
2014	Outer Critics Circle Award	Outstanding New Score	If/Then	Nominated	
2016	Drama Desk Award	Outstanding Music in a Play	Cymbeline	Nominated	
2018	Drama Desk Award	Outstanding Orchestrations	SpongeBob SquarePants	Nominated	
2018	Outer Critics Circle Award	Outstanding New Score	SpongeBob SquarePants	Won	
2018	Outer Critics Circle Award	Outstanding Orchestrations	SpongeBob SquarePants	Nominated	
2019	Helen Hayes Award	Outstanding Original Play or Musical Adaptation	Dave	Nominated	
2020	Drama Desk Award	Outstanding Orchestrations	Jagged Little Pill	Won	
2020	Outer Critics Circle Award	Outstanding Orchestrations	Jagged Little Pill	Honoree	
2020	Grammy Award	Best Musical Theater Album	Jagged Little Pill	Won	
2025	Grammy Award	Best Musical Theater Album	Hell's Kitchen	Won	
