= Flying Over Sunset =

2015 musical

- Music: Tom Kitt
- Lyrics: Michael Korie
- Book: James Lapine
- Premiere: 2015: Martha's Vineyard
- Productions: 2015 Martha's Vineyard Reading; 2016 Edgartown Reading; 2021 Broadway

Flying Over Sunset is a musical with music by Tom Kitt, lyrics by Michael Korie, and a book by James Lapine. The musical is a fictional account of a meeting between Aldous Huxley, Clare Boothe Luce and Cary Grant, who all used the drug LSD.

== Productions ==
=== Readings (2015 and 2016) ===
The musical had a reading in August 2015 at the Vineyard Arts Project (Martha's Vineyard) with Christine Ebersole playing Luce, and a cast featuring Boyd Gaines, Julia Murney, Tam Mutu and David Turner.

A second reading was held on July 29, 2016, in Edgartown, Massachusetts. Performers who took part in the reading included Marin Mazzie, Boyd Gaines, Betsy Wolfe, Tam Mutu and Jennifer Simard.

=== Broadway (2021) ===
The production was originally scheduled to open on April 16, 2020, but was postponed due to the COVID-19 pandemic.

The musical began previews on Broadway at the Vivian Beaumont Theater on November 11, 2021, and officially opened on December 13, 2021.

The cast included Carmen Cusack as Clare Boothe Luce, Harry Hadden-Paton as Aldous Huxley, Tony Yazbeck as Cary Grant, and Robert Sella as Gerald Heard. The musical was directed by Lapine with choreography by Michelle Dorrance, sets by Beowulf Boritt, costumes by Toni-Leslie James, lighting by Bradley King, and sound by Dan Moses Schreier.

The production closed on January 16, 2022, after 63 performances (28 previews and 35 performances).

== Plot ==
=== Act l ===
Huxley, Grant, and Luce separately obtained LSD. Each is dealing with a problem: Huxley is grieving his wife's death, Grant his ineptitude with women, and Luce her guilt over the deaths of her mother and daughter. Huxley takes LSD at the drugstore where he obtained it and imagines the figures from the painting “Judith With the Head of Holofernes” coming to life around him ("Bella Donna Di Agonia"). Grant's first trip is when he meets his younger self and his violent father ("I Have It All"/"Funny Money").

The three ultimately meet at the Brown Derby restaurant in Hollywood.

=== Act ll ===
Huxley, Grant, and Luce gather at Luce's estate in Malibu, where they embark on LSD trips with Gerald Heard as their guide.

== Cast ==
Character	Broadway (2021)
Aldous Huxley	Harry Hadden-Paton
Maria Huxley	Laura Shoop
Gerald Heard	Robert Sella
Cary Grant	Tony Yazbeck
Dr. Harris/Father	Nehal Joshi
Archie Leach	Atticus Ware
Clare Boothe Luce	Carmen Cusack
Ann Brokaw/Judith	Kanisha Marie Feliciano
Austin/Handmaiden	Michele Ragusa
Rosalia/Sophia Loren	Emily Pynenburg

== Musical numbers ==
Source: Playbill

Act I

- "The Music Plays On" - Company
- "Bella Donna Di Agonia" - Judith, Handmaiden, Aldous
- "Wondrous" - Aldous
- "Bella Donna Di Agonia" (Reprise) - Aldous
- "I Have It All" - Cary
- "Funny Money" - Archie, Cary, Father
- "A Sapphire Dragonfly" - Clare, Ann, Austin
- "Someone" - Clare
- "Flying Over Sunset" - Clare, Gerald, Ann, Austin
- "Flying Over Sunset" (Reprise) - Clare, Aldous, Gerald, Cary, Company

Act II

- "Om" - Gerald, Clare, Aldous, Cary
- "Huxley Knows" - Clare, Cary, Aldous
- "My Mother and I" - Clare, Cary, Gerald, Archie, Father, Ann, Austin
- "The Music Plays On" (Reprise) - Aldous, Maria
- "I Like to Lead" - Sophia, Cary
- "Rocket Ship" - Cary
- "An Interesting Place" - Austin, Ann, Clare
- "If Only I'd Known" - Clare, Austin, Ann
- "How?" - Clare
- "Three Englishmen" - Cary, Gerald, Aldous
- "The Melancholy Hour" - Maria, Ann, Austin, Archie, Father, Rosalia
- "The 23rd Ingredient" - Clare, Cary, Aldous, Gerald
- "Bella Donna Di Agonia" (2nd Reprise) - Judith, Handmaiden

== Reception ==
The show received mixed to negative reviews from critics, including AmNY, The New York Times, Theatrely, and Timeout. Critics generally disliked the book and music but praised the show's cast, technical effects, set, sound design, and choreography.

== Awards and nominations ==
=== Original Broadway production ===
Year	Award Ceremony	Category	Nominee	Result	Ref.
2022	Tony Awards	Best Actress in a Musical	Carmen Cusack	Nominated	
2022	Tony Awards	Best Original Score	Tom Kitt and Michael Korie	Nominated	
2022	Tony Awards	Best Scenic Design of a Musical	Beowulf Boritt and 59 Productions	Nominated	
2022	Tony Awards	Best Lighting Design of a Musical	Bradley King	Nominated	
2022	Drama Desk Awards	Outstanding Scenic Design of a Musical	Beowulf Boritt	Won	
2022	Drama Desk Awards	Outstanding Lighting Design for a Musical	Bradley King	Won	
2022	Drama Desk Awards	Outstanding Projection Design	59 Productions	Won	
2022	Outer Critics Circle Awards	Outstanding Actress in a Musical	Carmen Cusack	Nominated	
2022	Outer Critics Circle Awards	Outstanding Scenic Design	Beowulf Boritt	Nominated	
2022	Outer Critics Circle Awards	Outstanding Lighting Design	Bradley King	Nominated	
2022	Outer Critics Circle Awards	Outstanding Video/Projection Design	59 Productions and Benjamin Pearcy	Nominated	
2022	Chita Rivera Awards	Outstanding Male Dancer in a Broadway Show	Tony Yazbeck	Nominated	

Flying Over Sunset tied with MJ the Musical for the Drama Desk Award for Outstanding Lighting Design for a Musical.
