= Dave (film) =

1993 film by Gary Ross

- Theatrical release poster
- Directed by: Ivan Reitman
- Written by: Gary Ross
- Produced by: Ivan Reitman; Lauren Shuler Donner
- Starring: Kevin Kline; Sigourney Weaver; Frank Langella; Kevin Dunn; Ving Rhames; Ben Kingsley
- Cinematography: Adam Greenberg
- Edited by: Sheldon Kahn
- Music by: James Newton Howard
- Production companies: Northern Lights Entertainment; Donner/Shuler-Donner
- Distributed by: Warner Bros.
- Release date: May 7, 1993
- Running time: 110 minutes
- Country: United States
- Language: English
- Budget: $28 million
- Box office: $92 million

Dave is a 1993 American political comedy film directed by Ivan Reitman, written by Gary Ross, and starring Kevin Kline and Sigourney Weaver. Frank Langella, Kevin Dunn, Laura Linney, Ving Rhames, Charles Grodin, and Ben Kingsley appear in supporting roles. Kline plays a dual role: a presidential lookalike is hired by the Secret Service to be a stand-in for the President of the United States, but the stand-in becomes stuck in the role indefinitely after the president suffers a major stroke that his corrupt White House Chief of Staff (Langella) wants to keep secret from the First Lady (Weaver) and the general public. Dave was released by Warner Bros. on May 7, 1993, and was a box office success by grossing $92 million against a $28 million budget, and was met with critical acclaim.

== Plot ==
Dave Kovic runs a temporary employment agency in Georgetown, Washington, D.C., and, as a side job, capitalizes on his remarkable resemblance to President Bill Mitchell by comically impersonating him at events. Secret Service agent Duane Stevenson recruits him to impersonate Mitchell after a speech, ostensibly as a security precaution, but actually to allow Mitchell to meet Randi, a White House staffer with whom he is having an affair.

Dave's appearance goes well, but Mitchell suffers a major stroke while having sex with Randi. His Chief of Staff, Bob Alexander, is inspired to ask Dave to continue in his role. Bob's scheme is to force Vice President Gary Nance to resign by embroiling him in a savings and loan scandal; then Dave, acting as Mitchell, will appoint Bob vice president; then Dave will fake a more serious stroke and Bob will become president. Communications Director Alan Reed is initially hesitant, but eventually acquiesces and tells the press corps the stroke was minor. Claiming that Nance is mentally unstable, Bob and Alan convince Dave he must continue impersonating Mitchell for the good of the country. Meanwhile, Nance is sent on a goodwill tour of Africa.

Dave's charm and enthusiasm improves Mitchell's image and popularity. First Lady Ellen Mitchell, who has been estranged from her husband for years, initially suspects nothing and treats Dave with contempt on the few occasions they see each other. When she sees Dave's empathy towards a shy boy at a homeless shelter for which she is a staunch advocate, she begins to soften towards him. Her fury returns, though, after Bob forges Mitchell's signature on the veto of a bill that included funding for the shelter. Dave, after consulting his accountant friend Murray Blum, works with the Cabinet to restore the funding through a series of cuts and reinvestments. A furious Bob threatens to destroy Dave, but Alan vows to expose their scheme if he does and all three of them will end up in jail.

Ellen, having witnessed Dave's considerable efforts to save the shelter, tricks him into admitting he is an impostor and asks to see her husband. Dave has Duane escort them to a secret hospital room beneath the White House, where Mitchell remains in a coma. They are told he will not recover. They both resolve to leave the White House, but after spending a night out alone together, they begin to fall in love. Ellen tells Dave she has gone along with the charade of a happy marriage because she thought that as First Lady, she could help people. Dave tells her he wishes he could.

The next day, Dave, still as Mitchell, calls a press conference, making Bob furious that Dave is no longer obeying him. Dave fires Bob, who in turn tries to fire him, but Dave dares Bob to tell the press about the switch. Ellen arrives to support Dave disconcerting Bob. At the press conference, Dave announces both his firing of Bob and a monumental plan to provide a job to every American who wants one.

Nance returns from Africa and confronts Dave for trying to frame him for crimes of which Bob and the real Mitchell are actually guilty. In retaliation against Dave, Bob reveals evidence implicating Mitchell in the scandal, which Alan admits is true. Despite talk of impeachment, Dave refuses to back off his jobs plan, while Bob quietly begins to garner support for a presidential run.

During a joint session of Congress, Dave admits that Bob's allegations are true and produces proof, provided by Alan, that shows that Bob was the scandal's mastermind, and that Nance is innocent. After Dave apologizes to Nance and the country, he fakes another stroke; switching places with Mitchell, he resumes his previous life. The hospital pronounces the "second" stroke as major, and Mitchell continues to lie in a coma for five more months before dying. As acting president and then president, Nance backs the jobs plan, which becomes law. Bob and several Mitchell administration officials are indicted, but not Alan, who now serves under Nance.

Dave runs for the D.C. city council with the help of Murray and his employment agency staff. Dave is surprised one day when Ellen visits. To the shock of his staff, he escorts her into his office, where they share their first kiss. Dave closes the shades to give them privacy and Duane, wearing one of Dave's campaign buttons, steps in front of the door.

== Cast ==
- Kevin Kline as Dave Kovic/President William Harrison Mitchell
- Sigourney Weaver as Ellen Mitchell
- Frank Langella as Bob Alexander
- Kevin Dunn as Alan Reed
- Ving Rhames as Duane Stevenson
- Ben Kingsley as Vice President Gary Nance
- Charles Grodin as Murray Blum
- Faith Prince as Alice
- Laura Linney as Randi
- Tom Dugan as Jerry
- Stephen Root as Don Durenberger
- Ralph Manza as White House Barber
- Bonnie Hunt as White House Tour Guide
- Anna Deavere Smith as Mrs. Travis
- Charles Hallahan as Policeman
- Stefan Gierasch as House Majority Leader

=== Cameos ===
Politicians

- Senator Chris Dodd
- Senator Tom Harkin
- Senator Howard Metzenbaum
- Judge Abner J. Mikva
- Former Speaker of the House Tip O'Neill
- Senator Paul Simon
- Senator Alan K. Simpson

Media personalities

- Fred Barnes
- Eleanor Clift
- Bernard Kalb
- Larry King
- Michael Kinsley
- Morton Kondracke
- Jay Leno
- Frank Mankiewicz
- Chris Matthews
- John McLaughlin
- Robert Novak
- Richard Reeves
- Arnold Schwarzenegger
- Ben Stein
- Oliver Stone
- Kathleen Sullivan
- Jeff Tackett
- Helen Thomas
- Nina Totenberg
- Sander Vanocur
- John Yang

Senators Al D'Amato, Lloyd Bentsen, and Daniel Patrick Moynihan were scheduled to make cameo appearances in the film, but withdrew in protest of Warner Records' decision to release Body Count's song "Cop Killer". NBC also prohibited Andrea Mitchell from making a planned appearance in the film.

== Production ==
According to Ivan Reitman, Warner Bros. wanted a box office star to portray the lead role and that one executive even suggested Arnold Schwarzenegger to play the part. Michael Keaton was briefly cast in the role, but had to drop out. Both Warren Beatty and Kevin Costner were also considered for the role. In fact, it was Beatty who brought Dave to Reitman's attention. Kevin Kline almost turned down the role, because he thought he would be playing the same character he played in A Fish Called Wanda.

Nevertheless, Kline was hired to play the protagonist, as Reitman considered him to have a presidential look and be an actor "who was both dramatically strong and was light on his feet," as Kline would not only be playing a double role, but the film was a comedy that dealt with very serious subject matter. Reitman then called Sigourney Weaver, with whom he had worked in Ghostbusters, for the First Lady role. Ross was present for production, as he was interested in starting a directing career as well.

Filming began on August 13, 1992, in Los Angeles and Washington, D.C. White House interior sets were filmed at Warner Bros. Studios Burbank while exterior scenes were filmed at the Los Angeles County Arboretum in Arcadia, California. The film's Oval Office set was constructed based on a replica at the Ronald Reagan Presidential Library and would be reused more than 25 times, for television shows and films such as The Pelican Brief, In the Line of Fire, Hot Shots! Part Deux and Absolute Power. The Secret Service did not cooperate with the production unlike In the Line of Fire, describing Dave as "whimsical".

== Reception ==
=== Box office ===
Dave debuted at number 2 at the US box office, behind Dragon: The Bruce Lee Story. It reached number 1 in its second weekend. In total, Dave made $63.3 million in the United States and Canada and $28.5 million internationally for a worldwide total of $91.8 million.

=== Critical response ===
Dave has a 95% approval rating and an average score of 7.60/10 on Rotten Tomatoes, based on 62 reviews. The critics' consensus states: "Ivan Reitman's refreshingly earnest political comedy benefits from an understated, charming script and a breezy performance by Kevin Kline." It has a score of 76 out of 100 Metacritic, indicating "generally favorable" reviews, based on 30 reviews. Audiences polled by CinemaScore gave the film an average grade of "A−" on an A+ to F scale.

Roger Ebert of the Chicago Sun-Times gave the film three and a half stars out of four. Ebert praised the film's acting and wrote, "Dave takes that old plot about an ordinary person who is suddenly thrust into a position of power, and finds a fresh way to tell it. [...] When I first heard this story line, I imagined that Dave would be completely predictable. I was wrong. The movie is more proof that it isn't what you do, it's how you do it: Ivan Reitman's direction and Gary Ross's screenplay use intelligence and warmhearted sentiment to make Dave into wonderful lighthearted entertainment. [...] Both Kline and Weaver are good at playing characters of considerable intelligence, and that's the case here. The movie may be built on subtle variations of the Idiot Plot, in which the characters skillfully avoid tripping over obvious conclusions, but they bring such particular qualities to their characters that we almost believe them."

Then-President Bill Clinton approved of the film, and gave Ross a framed script, which Clinton had autographed, writing that it was a "funny, often accurate lampooning of politics." Clinton also gave Ross a picture of himself holding a Dave mug.

=== Accolades ===
| Award | Category | Nominee(s) | Result | Ref. |
|---|---|---|---|---|
| Academy Awards | Best Screenplay – Written Directly for the Screen | Gary Ross | Nominated | |
| American Comedy Awards | Funniest Actor in a Motion Picture (Leading Role) | Kevin Kline | Nominated | |
| American Comedy Awards | Funniest Supporting Actor in a Motion Picture | Charles Grodin | Nominated | |
| ASCAP Film and Television Music Awards | Top Box Office Films | James Newton Howard | Nominated | |
| Golden Globe Awards | Best Motion Picture – Musical or Comedy | | Nominated | |
| Golden Globe Awards | Best Actor in a Motion Picture – Musical or Comedy | Kevin Kline | Nominated | |
| Political Film Society Awards | Democracy | | Nominated | |
| Writers Guild of America Awards | Best Screenplay – Written Directly for the Screen | Gary Ross | Nominated | |

== Other media ==
=== Musical ===
A musical based on the movie opened at the Arena Stage in Washington, D.C., in July 2018. The book was written by Thomas Meehan and Nell Benjamin, with music by Tom Kitt. The production was directed by Tina Landau and starred Drew Gehling as Dave and Douglas Sills as Chief of Staff Bob Alexander.

== See also ==
- List of American films of 1993
- The Magnificent Fraud
- Moon over Parador
- Mr. Smith Goes to Washington
- Double Star
