= Dave (musical) =

- Music: Tom Kitt
- Lyrics: Nell Benjamin
- Book: Thomas Meehan; Nell Benjamin
- Basis: Dave by Gary Ross
- Premiere: July 18, 2018: Arena Stage, Washington, D.C.

Dave is a musical with music by Tom Kitt, lyrics by Nell Benjamin, and a book by Benjamin and Thomas Meehan. Based on the 1993 American political comedy film of the same name written by Gary Ross, the musical made its world premiere try-out at Arena Stage in Washington, D.C. in July 2018. The musical centers on Dave Kovic, a high school teacher (and presidential look-alike) who is hired by the Secret Service when the President falls ill.

== Background ==
The musical is based on the 1993 film Dave. The film itself starred Kevin Kline as Dave Kovic and President Bill Mitchell and Sigourney Weaver as First Lady Ellen Mitchell and featured a number of prominent actors in supporting roles including Frank Langella, Kevin Dunn, Ving Rhames, Charles Grodin, and Ben Kingsley. The film was produced on a budget of $28 million, earning $63.3 million

The musical was first reported in November 2014 by Variety following a private industry reading held on October 31. In summer 2016, it was announced that the musical held a second private reading starring Brian d’Arcy James and Carmen Cusack. An additional lab was held in 2017, again with James starring in the title role.

It was announced in January 2018 that the musical would premiere at Arena Stage in Washington, D.C. in summer 2018. On March 27, 2018, it was announced that Drew Gehling would star in the title role. In May 2018, it was announced that Gehling would be joined by Mamie Parris as Ellen Mitchell.

== Productions ==
=== Arena Stage (2018) ===
The musical began previews at Arena Stage in Washington, D.C., on July 18, 2018, for a limited engagement until August 19, 2018. The production was directed by Tina Landau. The production's design team included scenery by Dane Laffrey, costumes by Toni-Leslie James, lighting by Japhy Weideman, projections by Peter Nigrini, and sound by Walter Trarbach.

The musical has been updated to reflect current technology and practices, such as social media, cell phones, Twitter, a 24/7 news cycle and YouTube.

== Characters and original cast ==
Character	Reading (2016)	Lab (2017)	Arena Stage (2018)
Dave Kovic / President Bill Mitchell	Brian d’Arcy James	Brian d’Arcy James	Drew Gehling
First Lady Ellen Mitchell	Carmen Cusack	Stephanie J. Block	Mamie Parris
Agent Duane Bolden	Colby Lewis	James Monroe Iglehart	Josh Breckenridge
Chief of Staff Bob Alexander	Michael Rupert		Douglas Sills
Communications Director Susan Lee	Ann Sanders	Ann Harada	Bryonha Marie Parham
Vice President Gary Nance / President Andrew Johnson	Jonathan Rayson	Jonathan Rayson	Jonathan Rayson
Randi Hagopian	Rachel Flynn	Rachel Flynn	Rachel Flynn
Murray Stein / President John Quincy Adams			Kevin R. Free
Mrs. Smit / President William Howard Taft			Sherri L. Edelen
Montana Jefferson			Dana Costello
Mr. Wheeler			Adam J. Levy
Paul			Vishal Vaidya
President James Buchanan			Jamison Scott
President Rutherford B. Hayes			Erin Quill
President Benjamin Harrison			Trista Dollison
President Warren Harding			Jared Bradshaw

== Musical numbers ==
Washington D.C.

Act One

- "There’s Always A Way" – Dave, Bill, and Ensemble
- "I’m The President" – Dave, Susan, Bob, Duane, Bill, Randi, and Ensemble
- "Bad Example" – Bob, Susan, and Dave
- "Hero" – Dave
- "The Last Time I Fake It" – Ellen, Dave, and Ensemble
- "Whole New Man" – Dave, Duane, Ellen, Susan, and Ensemble
- "Not My Problem" – Duane and Dave
- "Everybody Needs Some Help Sometime" – Ellen, Dave, and Ensemble
- "Sake of Argument" – Dave and Ellen

Act Two

- "Kill That Guy" – Bob, Susan, and Ensemble
- "Not Again" – Ellen and Dave
- "Whole New Man (Reprise)" – Dave, Ellen, Susan, Bob, and Ensemble
- "Presidential Party" – Dave and Ensemble
- "A Little Too Late" – Ellen, Dave, and Duane
- "History" – Dave
- "It’s On Us" – Ellen, Dave, and Ensemble

== Awards and honors ==
=== Original Washington, D.C. production ===
Year	Award Ceremony	Category	Nominee	Result
2019
2019	Helen Hayes Awards	Outstanding Direction in a Musical - Hayes	Tina Landau	Won
2019	Helen Hayes Awards	Outstanding Lead Actor in a Musical - Hayes	Drew Gehling	Nominated
2019	Helen Hayes Awards	Outstanding Lead Actor in a Musical - Hayes	Douglas Sills	Nominated
2019	Helen Hayes Awards	Outstanding Lead Actress in a Musical - Hayes	Bryonha Marie Parham	Nominated
2019	Helen Hayes Awards	Outstanding Original Play or Musical Adaptation	Tom Kitt, Thomas Meehan, and Nell Benjamin	Nominated
2019	Helen Hayes Awards	Outstanding Ensemble in a Musical - Hayes		Nominated
2019	Helen Hayes Awards	Outstanding Production in a Musical - Hayes		Nominated
