= Bloody Bloody Andrew Jackson =

Comedic historical rock musical

- Broadway promotional poster
- Music: Michael Friedman
- Lyrics: Michael Friedman
- Book: Alex Timbers
- Productions: 2008 Los Angeles; 2010 Off-Broadway; 2010 Broadway; Regional and international productions
- Awards: Outer Critics Circle Award for Outstanding New Off-Broadway Musical; Drama Desk Award for Outstanding Book of a Musical

Bloody Bloody Andrew Jackson is a satirical historical rock musical with music and lyrics written by Michael Friedman and a book written by its director Alex Timbers.

The show is about the founding of the Democratic Party. It redefines Andrew Jackson, America's seventh President, as an emo rock star and focuses on populism, the Indian Removal Act, and his relationship with his wife Rachel.

== Synopsis ==
The show opens when the cast, dressed as 19th-century American cowboys and prostitutes, take the stage. They are led by Andrew Jackson. They sing about their eagerness to strip the English, Spanish, French, and, most importantly, the Native Americans, of their land in North America, and their desire to bring political power back to the public and away from the elite ("Populism, Yea Yea"). This section also introduces the Storyteller, a historian who tells the audience what his legacy was after certain notable events.

Jackson's childhood is shown in the Tennessee hills during the late 18th century. His family and the local shoe cobbler die of cholera and an Indian attack. This leads him to join the military, where he is imprisoned by the British. Jackson begins to express his disdain for the U.S. government's lack of involvement with the people of the frontier and how he wishes someone would stand up to them ("I'm Not That Guy").

Jackson is then shown as a young adult, regaling local tavern goers with his short meeting with George Washington. He is interrupted and attacked by several Spaniards. Jackson defeats them, but is injured in the process. A woman named Rachel helps him to recover from his injuries. They bond over a shared habit of self-harm, playing on emo music's frequent glorification of pain, and reference Illness as Metaphor by Susan Sontag as a way to ground their fantasies. Jackson and Rachel eventually marry, though Rachel is not yet divorced from her current husband ("Illness as a Metaphor"). At the end of the song, news comes that British, Indian, and Spanish forces are making advances into American territory. Meanwhile, the U.S. government continues to do nothing to stop the attacks. Jackson realizes that if he wants this cycle to end, he must change things himself and takes a stand, shooting the Storyteller in the neck and saying that he'll take it from there ("I'm So That Guy").

Jackson organizes a militia to drive Indian nations out of the Southeast ("Ten Little Indians"). In the aftermath of a battle, he adopts a young Native American child called Lyncoya. John Quincy Adams, Henry Clay, John Calhoun, and Martin Van Buren are introduced as they express their concern over Jackson's unauthorized territorial expansion. Jackson rebuffs their pleas, explaining how he has driven out the French and the Spanish, while acquiring more land than Thomas Jefferson.

The Battle of New Orleans transforms Jackson into a national hero. He becomes Governor of Florida and decides to run for United States President in 1824. Although he receives the most popular and Electoral votes, he does not have a majority, leading to a loss in the subsequent contingent election in the House of Representatives. ("The Corrupt Bargain"). Jackson spends the four years after the election at his home, The Hermitage. He returns from political exile and forms the Democratic Party. During the presidential election of 1828, Andrew Jackson becomes a surprise candidate and mocks the others for not being able to handle the pressure of politics ("Rock Star"). However, his campaign is grueling both publicly and personally to Jackson and his family. Rachel dislikes not having a private life, feels as though she has been making more compromises in their relationship than he has, and questions Andrew's devotion to her versus the American People ("The Great Compromise").

Days before the election, a Senate panel led by Clay investigates Jackson's past wrongdoings and slings accusations, including accusing Rachel of bigamy. Jackson wins the election despite this and becomes the 7th President of the United States. However, the accusation of his rivals, along with the stress of the election, leads to Rachel dying of grief. He vows to use both his presidency and his wife's death as a mandate to "take this country back" ("Public Life").

Once in office, Jackson is faced with a plethora of problems, ranging from the National Bank to questions about Indian relocation. Being the "People’s President," Jackson begins polling the American populace on all executive decisions. This draws the ire of Congress and the Supreme Court. In response, Jackson consolidates Executive Power, thus making the Presidency more powerful than Congress and the Courts. At first, his exhilarating cowboy-like governing tactics are met with great enthusiasm by the average citizen. But, as the problems grow tougher, the public begins to resent being asked to make difficult decisions ("Crisis Averted").

As the American people gradually turn on him, Jackson takes stock of all that he has lost: his family, his wife, and now the love of the American public. He decides he must take ultimate responsibility for the nation's choices and declares that he alone will be the one to make the unenviable policy decisions regarding the Indians' fate ("The Saddest Song"). He summons Black Fox — an Indian Chief who organized the remaining Indian tribes into a confederation against Tennessee settlers — in order to make one last deal with the Native Americans still living in American Territories. Jackson implores Black Fox to peacefully move his people west of the Mississippi River. Black Fox asks for time to consult his tribe, but Jackson violently snaps and decrees that federal troops will forcibly move the Indians west, leading to thousands of deaths along the Trail of Tears.

Near the end, the musical reviews Jackson's legacy and the views attributed to him. Some believe he was one of America's greatest presidents, while others believe him to be an "American Hitler" who deliberately engaged in a genocide against the Indigenous American people. The final scene shows Jackson receiving an honorary doctorate at Harvard. He reflects upon his achievements and his questionable decisions. The show then offers a more modern view of Jackson's damning legacy and American society's collective culpability in shaping a new country at the expense of the native population ("Second Nature").

Finally, the company gathers to sing "The Hunters of Kentucky", before taking their bows.

== Production history ==
=== World premiere ===
Developed by New York-based experimental company Les Freres Corbusier, Bloody Bloody Andrew Jackson had workshop productions in August 2006 at the Williamstown Theatre Festival and in May 2007 at the New 42nd Street Studios, New York. It premiered in January 2008 in Culver City, California at the Kirk Douglas Theatre, produced by Center Theatre Group. The cast included Sebastian Arcelus, Stephanie D'Abruzzo, Kevin Del Aguila, Darren Goldstein, Greg Hildreth, Jeff Hiller, Adam O'Byrne, Maria Elena Ramirez, Kate Roberts, Jeanine Serralles, Ben Steinfeld, Robbie Sublett, Ian Unterman, and Ben Walker. Robert Brill was the set designer, Jeff Croiter the lighting designer, Emily Rebholz the costume designer, Bart Fasbender the sound designer, and Jacob Pinholster the video designer. Kelly Devine was the choreographer and Gabriel Kahane the music director.

=== New York premiere ===
Bloody Bloody Andrew Jackson opened Off-Broadway in May 2009 at The Public Theater in New York in a concert version, and returned to run from March 23 (previews) to June 27, 2010. The cast included River Alexander, David Axelrod, James Barry, Darren Goldstein, Greg Hildreth, Jeff Hiller, Lisa Joyce, Lucas Near-Verbrugghe, Bryce Pinkham, Maria Elena Ramirez, Kate Roberts, Ben Steinfeld, Ben Walker, Matthew Rocheleau and Colleen Werthmann. Scenic design was by Donyale Werle, lighting design by Justin Townsend, costume design by Emily Rebholz, and sound design by Bart Fasbender. Danny Mefford was the choreographer and Justin Levine was the music director.

=== Broadway premiere ===
The show premiered on Broadway at the Bernard B. Jacobs Theatre, with previews starting on September 21, 2010, and opening night October 13, 2010. Many of the cast from the off-Broadway production reprised their roles, including Benjamin Walker in the title role, Maria Elena Ramirez, Jeff Hiller and Lucas Near-Verbrugghe. Despite positive reviews and early Tony buzz, the musical closed on January 2, 2011, after 120 performances.

Critics blamed the poor economy during the show's run and its unorthodox story and presentation for the show's failure to build popularity on Broadway. The play, which cost $4.5 million to produce, "will close at a loss to investors," said The New York Times, which characterized it as "a favorite of critics that has had trouble catching on with theatergoers."

=== Boston ===
Its first Boston production was at the SpeakEasy Stage Company in October 2012, the show was directed by Paul Melone, musical direction Nicholas James Connell, choreography Larry Sousa, fight choreography Angie Jepson, set design Eric Levenson, costume design Elisabetta Polito, lighting design Jeff Adelberg, sound design Eric Norris, stage manager Amy Spalletta and assistant stage manager Katherine Clanton.

The cast featured Brandon Barbosa (Lyncoya), Samil Battenfeld (Lyncoya), Mary Callanan (Storyteller/Ensemble), Gus Curry (Andrew Jackson), Tom Hamlett (John Quincy Adams/Ensemble), Ryan Halsaver (John Calhoun), Amy Jo Jackson (Ensemble), Michael Levesque (Ensemble), Evan Murphy (Ensemble), Josh Pemberton (Martin Van Buren), Diego Klok Perez (Henry Clay/Black Fox/Ensemble), Ben Rosenblatt (James Monroe), Alessandra Vaganek (Rachel Jackson), and Brittany Walters (Ensemble).

=== Other productions ===
The first production of the show after its New York run was a non-Equity performance at the University School of Nashville in November, 2011. The performance was met with great enthusiasm from the Nashville community and long-time supporters of Andrew Jackson. The production was directed by Catherine Coke with music direction by Ginger Newman and choreography by Abigayle Horrell. The cast included Sam Douglas as Andrew Jackson, Abigayle Horrell as Rachel Jackson, and Forest Miller as the bandleader.

The show was produced by Know Theatre of Cincinnati in April 2012, with The Dukes are Dead as the onstage band.

Productions debuted in the San Francisco Bay Area in San Jose, California at the San Jose Stage Company from June 2 to July 22, 2012, and in San Francisco, California at the San Francisco Playhouse from October 8 to November 24, 2012.

Bloody Bloody Andrew Jackson, directed by Scott Spence and starring Dan Folino as Andrew Jackson, was performed at the Beck Center in Lakewood, Ohio from May 25 to July 22, 2012.

The show was performed in Buffalo, New York by the American Repertory Theater of Western New York from September 19 to October 12, 2013. The show had 12 runs.

The show was performed at ArtsWest in Seattle, Washington from September to October 2012.

A staged reading of the show was performed by Outré Theatre Company in September 2013, directed by Skye Whitcomb.

Bloody Bloody Andrew Jackson had its Central Florida premiere at the Orlando International Fringe Theater Festival in the spring of 2014. Produced by BTW Productions and directed by Adam Graham with choreography by Michelle Alagna and musical direction by Brandon Fender, the cast included A. Ross Neal as Andrew Jackson, Jacqueline Torgas as Rachel Jackson, Anitra Pritchard-Bryant as the Storyteller and featured the band Hey, Angeline led by Anthony Smith as the Band Leader. Well received by critics and audiences alike, the show sold out the entirety of its limited run and went on to win Critic's Choice Award for Best Musical of 2014.

A production of Bloody Bloody Andrew Jackson ran on the American Shakespeare Center from June 15 to November 26, 2016.

=== Controversy ===
The original Off-Broadway run was criticized by the Native American community at large and a production in Minneapolis in June 2014 faced public protest by New Native Theatre.

At the Fountain Theatricals, a student organization at Stanford University dedicated to musical theatre and performing arts education, cancelled its production of the show for their Fall 2014 semester production due to pressure from the Stanford American Indian Organization. SAIO voiced concerns about the use of offensive caricatures of Native people regardless of the satirical style of the show.

Raleigh Little Theatre cancelled their 2015 season's production of Bloody Bloody Andrew Jackson and replaced it with Hedwig and the Angry Inch, claiming a lack of support from local members of the Native American community.

== Characters and original casts ==
Character	Kirk Douglas Theatre	Public Theater Lab Series	Public Theater	Broadway
Character	2008	2009	2010	2010
Andrew Jackson	Benjamin Walker	Benjamin Walker	Benjamin Walker	Benjamin Walker
The Storyteller	Taylor Wilcox	Colleen Werthmann	Colleen Werthmann	Kristine Nielsen
Elizabeth / Erica	Diane Davis	Kate Cullen Roberts	Kate Cullen Roberts	Kate Cullen Roberts
Andrew Sr. / Calhoun	Adam O’Byrne	Darren Goldstein	Darren Goldstein	Darren Goldstein
Cobbler / Messenger / John Quincy Adams / Tour Guide / Florida Man	Matthew Rocheleau	Jeff Hiller	Jeff Hiller	Jeff Hiller
Toula / Female Ensemble	Nadia Quinn	Nadia Quinn	Nadia Quinn	Nadia Quinn
Female Soloist / Announcer / Naomi	—N/a	Lisa Joyce	Emily Young	Emily Young
Monroe	Ben Steinfeld	Ben Steinfeld	Ben Steinfeld	Ben Steinfeld
Rachel / Florida Woman	Anjali Bhimani	Maria Elena Ramirez	Maria Elena Ramirez	Maria Elena Ramirez
Black Fox / Clay	Will Greenberg	Bryce Pinkham	Michael Crane	Bryce Pinkham
Male Soloist / Citizen / Phil	Will Collyer	James Barry	James Barry	James Barry
Red Eagle / University President	Greg Hildreth	Greg Hildreth	Greg Hildreth	Greg Hildreth
Keokuk / Van Buren	Brian Hostenske	Lucas Near-Verbrugghe	Lucas Near-Verbrugghe	Lucas Near-Verbrugghe
Lyncoya	Sebastian Gonzalez	David Axelrod	River Alexander	Cameron Ocasio

== Musical numbers ==
- "Populism, Yea, Yea!" – Company
- "I’m Not That Guy" – Andrew Jackson
- "Illness As Metaphor" – Andrew Jackson, Rachel Jackson, James Monroe, & Bandleader
- "I’m So That Guy" – Andrew Jackson & Company
- "Ten Little Indians" – Female Soloist & Female Ensemble
- "The Corrupt Bargain" – Female Ensemble (Toula, Elizabeth, & Naomi), John C. Calhoun, John Quincy Adams, & Henry Clay
- "Rock Star" – Male Soloist, Andrew Jackson, Bandleader & Company
- "The Great Compromise" – Rachel Jackson
- "Public Life" – Andrew Jackson & Company
- "Crisis Averted" – Male Soloist & Bandleader
- "The Saddest Song" – Andrew Jackson & Company
- "Second Nature" – Bandleader
- "The Hunters of Kentucky" – Bandleader, Andrew Jackson & Company

== Reception ==
Bloody Bloody Andrew Jackson received mostly positive to mixed reviews. The New York Daily News called it "bloody entertaining" and Benjamin Walker "magnetic and energetic," applauding the show for its lightweight and silly atmosphere.

Terry Teachout of The Wall Street Journal appraised it thus: "Comically speaking, Bloody Bloody Andrew Jackson is a one-joke show that gets three-quarters of its laughs from hearing 19th-century characters use 21st-century slang. Politically speaking, it's little more than an ultra-predictable mashup of Howard Zinn and Dances With Wolves (white people bad, red people good)… Michael Friedman's hard-edged, guitar-driven score is, however, another story. The music is tuneful, [and] the lyrics are honest-to-God smart."

Ben Brantley of The New York Times noted: "There's not a show in town that more astutely reflects the state of this nation than Bloody Bloody Andrew Jackson… both smarter and cruder than your average Broadway fare"; whereas fellow Times critic Charles Isherwood said the musical "taps most directly into the vein of snarky post-collegiate humor epitomized by The Daily Show and The Colbert Report… and panders cheerfully to the taste for ribald humor that is a primary ingredient in the more frat-boyish elements of late-night comedy."

A San Francisco critic of that city's production, however, referred to the musical as "an unmistakable exercise in American self-loathing."

=== Legacy ===
Some retrospectives have taken a further interest in the show and its historiographic significance, in particular comparing the relative obscurity of Bloody Bloody Andrew Jackson to the runaway success of Hamilton, a similar pop-music modernization of an eponymous early American figure. Ed Power of Telegraph compared the former's "Gen X jokey cynicism" to the latter's sense of millennial optimism.

== Awards and nominations ==
=== Off-Broadway production ===
Year	Award Ceremony	Category	Nominee	Result
2010	Drama League Awards	Distinguished Production of a Musical	Alex Timbers (book); Michael Friedman (music and lyrics)	Nominated
2010	Drama League Awards	Distinguished Performance	Benjamin Walker	Nominated
2010	Outer Critics Circle Awards	Outstanding New Off-Broadway Musical		Won
2010	Outer Critics Circle Awards	Outstanding New Score (Broadway or Off-Broadway)	Michael Friedman	Nominated
2010	Outer Critics Circle Awards	Outstanding Director of a Musical	Alex Timbers	Nominated
2010	Outer Critics Circle Awards	Outstanding Set Design (Play or Musical)	Donyale Werle	Nominated
2010	Outer Critics Circle Awards	Outstanding Lighting Design (Play or Musical)	Justin Townsend	Nominated
2010	Drama Desk Awards	Outstanding Book of a Musical	Alex Timbers	Won
2010	Drama Desk Awards	Outstanding Music	Michael Friedman	Nominated

=== Broadway production ===
Year	Award Ceremony	Category	Nominee	Result
2011	Tony Awards	Best Book of a Musical	Alex Timbers	Nominated
2011	Tony Awards	Best Scenic Design of a Musical	Donyale Werle	Nominated
2011	Astaire Awards	Outstanding Choreographer in a Broadway Show	Danny Mefford	Nominated
