= Nell Benjamin =

Dramatist and composer

- Education: Harvard University; Trinity College Dublin
- Occupations: Lyricist; writer; composer
- Spouse: Laurence O'Keefe (m. 2001)
- Writing career
- Genres: Musical theatre, especially adaptation of film
- Notable awards: Laurence Olivier Award for Best New Musical; 2011 Legally Blonde

Nell Benjamin is a lyricist, writer, and composer noted for her work in musical theatre. With her husband and frequent collaborator Laurence O'Keefe, she won the Laurence Olivier Award for writing Legally Blonde in 2011. She has been nominated for two Tony Awards; 2007's Best Original Score for Legally Blonde, and then again in 2018 for her lyrics for Mean Girls.

== Early life and education ==
Benjamin grew up in New York City and attended Harvard University, where she met future husband Laurence O'Keefe. She earned a master's degree in women's studies from Trinity College Dublin. After graduating, she moved to Los Angeles and, with O'Keefe, worked as a writer for television and film.

== Theatre career ==
Benjamin and O'Keefe collaborated on a number of original musicals which ran Off-Broadway, including The Mice (2000), an adaptation of Sarah, Plain and Tall (2002), and Cam Jansen And The Curse Of The Emerald Elephant (2004), based on the Cam Jansen mystery series. The Mice was turned into a musical with three short parts, titled 3three, which was produced at the Prince Music Theater, Philadelphia, Pennsylvania in 2000 and at the Ahmanson Theatre, Los Angeles in 2001.

Benjamin and O'Keefe's first Broadway production was Legally Blonde: The Musical, for which they created the music and lyrics. Legally Blonde premiered on Broadway in April 2007, ran for 595 performances and 30 previews, and closed in October 2008. Benjamin and O'Keefe were nominated for a Tony Award for Best Original Score.

Legally Blonde: The Musical opened in January 2010 on London's West End at the Savoy Theatre, ran for two and a half years, and won three Olivier Awards, including Best New Musical, Best Actress and Best Supporting Actress.

Benjamin's first full-length play, The Explorers Club, premiered Off-Broadway in 2013. A farce about a woman trying to gain entry to an elite club of explorers in 19th century Britain, it won the Outer Critics Circle Award for Outstanding Off-Broadway Play. Reviewers largely praised Benjamin's skills as a comedic writer.

She wrote the lyrics to Mean Girls, the stage adaptation of the 2004 film of the same name, with Jeff Richmond composing the music and Tina Fey writing the book. Mean Girls premiered on Broadway in April 2018. She was again nominated for the Tony Award for Best Original Score (alongside Richmond).

She wrote the lyrics to the musical Dave, based on the 1993 American political comedy film of the same name and co-wrote the book with Thomas Meehan. It was produced at the Arena Stage in Washington, D.C. in July 2018.

She wrote the book and lyrics for the musical Because of Winn Dixie, which is based on the novel by Kate DiCamillo. The music is composed by Duncan Sheik. The musical ran at the Goodspeed Opera House in East Haddam, Connecticut, from July 2019 to September 2019 after being produced in December 2013 at the Arkansas Repertory Theatre, February 2015 at Delaware Theatre Company and January 2017 at the Alabama Shakespeare Festival. She has been tapped to write the book and lyrics for Come Fall in Love - The DDLJ Musical, which is premiering at the Old Globe fall 2022 in preparation for a Broadway run.

In July 2025, The Old Globe Theatre in San Diego announced the world premiere of a Renaissance Fair-themed musical called Huzzah!, written and composed by Benjamin and Laurence O'Keefe, which premiered on September 13, 2025.

== Personal life ==
Benjamin married Laurence O'Keefe in 2001. The couple live in Manhattan.

== Stage credits ==
Year	Title	Role	Venue	Ref.
2000	The Mice	Lyricist	Regional, Prince Music Theater	
2002	Sarah, Plain and Tall	Lyricist	Off-Broadway, Lucille Lortel Theatre	
2004	Cam Jansen	Author, Composer, Lyricist	Off-Broadway, Lamb's Theatre	
2007	Pirates! (Or, Gilbert and Sullivan Plunder'd)	Additional lyrics	Regional, Goodspeed Musicals and Paper Mill Playhouse	
2007	Legally Blonde	Composer, Lyricist	Broadway, Palace Theatre	
2013	Because of Winn-Dixie	Author, Lyricist	Regional, Arkansas Repertory Theatre	
2013	The Explorers Club	Author	Off-Broadway, Manhattan Theatre Club	
2017	Mean Girls	Lyricist	Regional, The National Theatre	
2018	Mean Girls	Lyricist	Broadway, August Wilson Theatre	
2018	Dave	Author, Lyricist	Regional, Arena Stage	
2018	Half Time	Lyricist	Regional, Paper Mill Playhouse	
2025	Huzzah!	Author, composer, lyricist	Regional, Old Globe	

== Awards and nominations ==
Year	Award	Category	Work	Result	Ref.
2003	Kleban Prize for Musical Theatre: Lyricist		Sarah, Plain and Tall	Won	
2007	Tony Awards	Best Original Score	Legally Blonde	Nominated	
2007	Drama Desk Awards	Outstanding Music	Legally Blonde	Nominated	
2007	Drama Desk Awards	Outstanding Lyrics	Legally Blonde	Nominated	
2018	Tony Awards	Best Original Score	Mean Girls	Nominated	
2018	Drama Desk Awards	Outstanding Lyrics	Mean Girls	Nominated	
2019	Helen Hayes Award	Outstanding Play or Musical Adaptation	Dave	Nominated	
