= Douglas Sills =

American actor (born 1960)

- Born: Douglas Howard Sills; July 5, 1960 (age 66); Detroit, Michigan, United States
- Education: University of Michigan; Cranbrook Kingswood School
- Occupations: Actor, singer
- Known for: The Scarlet Pimpernel; The Addams Family

Douglas Howard Sills (born July 5, 1960) is an American actor and singer.

He made his professional stage acting debut with principal roles in the national tours of Into the Woods and The Secret Garden. He is most well-known for his leading roles in the Broadway production and national tour of The Scarlet Pimpernel, the Broadway production of Little Shop of Horrors, and the national tour of The Addams Family.

== Early life ==
Sills was born in Detroit, Michigan, the son of Rhoda (Nemeth) and Archie Sills, and grew up in the suburb of Franklin, in a Jewish household. He was friends (and did amateur theatrics and films) with both Sam Raimi and Bruce Campbell. Sills attended Cranbrook School, from which he graduated in 1978, and the University of Michigan where he majored in music. He then continued his education at the American Conservatory Theater in California.

== Career ==
During the 1990s, Sills built a reputation as a stage character actor, especially in the professional theaters of southern California. He also performed in several national tours, including Into the Woods and The Secret Garden, which would also feature future Broadway stars as James Stacy Barbour and Audra McDonald. His first Broadway role, however, came when composer Frank Wildhorn and lyricist Nan Knighton approached him in hopes of finding a male lead for their new musical, The Scarlet Pimpernel. Before this audition, Sills told his agent not to send him to any more auditions because he planned to attend law school. With a score in the 99th percentile on the Law School Admission Test (LSAT), Sills hoped to attend Stanford Law School. However, being a fan of the movie as a child, Sills decided to give acting one more chance and was offered the lead as Sir Percy Blakeney.

Douglas Sills opened in his first Broadway show on November 9, 1997. Continuing the role in three other versions of the show, Sills received a Tony Award nomination. He portrayed the foppish hero in SP 1.0 (The Original Broadway Production, starring Terrence Mann, Christine Andreas and Gilles Chiason), SP 2.0 (the revised Broadway production, starring Rachel York and Rex Smith), and for several months in the national tour. Although rumored as playing the title role in Wildhorn's Dracula, the Musical, Sills opted out (despite doing a recording demo), and Tom Hewitt portrayed the gothic character at the premiere at the La Jolla Playhouse in 2001. He played Orin Scrivello and several other roles in the 2003 Broadway revival cast of Little Shop of Horrors.

In 2004, Sills joined the Broadway-bound Chicago production of Monty Python's Spamalot. However, before the production began, Sills left due to reported "major script changes." In early 2005, production plans were announced for Wildhorn's new musical Cyrano de Bergerac, from the same team that helped launch his career with The Scarlet Pimpernel. The title role was written specifically for Sills, however, producers dropped plans for the show in spring 2006 without explanation. A studio-concept recording was planned, starring Sills, Linda Eder and Rob Evan, but plans for it also quickly fell through.

In 2009, Sills starred opposite Kristin Chenoweth at the Encores! New York City Center production of Music in the Air, a long-forgotten Kern-Hamerstein musical from the 1930s. The concert-style version ran February 5 through February 8. Sills assumed the role of Gomez Addams in the national tour of The Addams Family in September 2011 until the company's closing on December 30, 2012.

From March 27 to April 12, 2013, Sills took on the role of Jack in Long Wharf Theatre's production of William Mastrosimone's Ride the Tiger.

Sills played Walter Burns in La Jolla Playhouse's production of His Girl Friday from May 28 to June 30, 2013.

Sills appeared on Broadway beginning in April 2015, playing an aging orchestra conductor in the comedy Living on Love, written by Joe DiPietro, starring Renee Fleming, Jerry O'Connell and Anna Chlumsky.

He appeared in the new musical Dave at the Arena Stage in Washington, D.C., in 2018, in the role of Chief of Staff Bob Alexander. The musical has music by Tom Kitt, lyrics by Nell Benjamin, and the book by Benjamin and Thomas Meehan and is based on the 1993 film Dave.

As of 2022, Sills plays Monsieur Baudin in HBO's The Gilded Age.

== Personal life ==
Sills is gay. He said in 2015, "I’ve been out since the beginning of my career—I was never in." Sills met then-partner Todd Murray in 1994 while touring with The Secret Garden, and the relationship ended in 2013.

== Notable theatre roles ==
Show:	Role(s):	Year(s):	Production:
Into the Woods	Rapunzel's Prince u/s Cinderella's Prince	1988–1990	US National Tour
The Philadelphia Story	C.K. Dexter Haven	1992	Cosa Mesa, California
The Secret Garden	Dr. Neville Craven u/s Lord Archibald Craven	1992–1994	US National Tour
The Secret Garden	Lord Archibald Craven	1995	Pittsburgh, Pennsylvania
She Stoops to Folly	Ned Thornhill	1995	Cosa Mesa, California
Chess	Freddie Trumper "The American"	1995	Los Angeles, California
The Scarlet Pimpernel	Percy Blakeney / The Scarlet Pimpernel	1997–2000	Broadway
The Scarlet Pimpernel	Percy Blakeney / The Scarlet Pimpernel	2000	US National Tour
Mack and Mabel	Mack Sennett	2000	Los Angeles, California
Much Ado About Nothing	Benedict	2001	Cosa Mesa, California
Show Boat	Gaylord Ravenal	2001	Hollywood, California
Carnival	Marco	2002	New York, New York
Wish Upon a Star	N/A	2002	New York, New York (Workshop)
A Little Night Music	Count Carl-Magnus Malcolm	2002	Washington, D.C.
The Gondoliers	Don Alhambra	2003	New York, New York
Little Shop of Horrors	Orin Scrivello & Others	2003–2004	Broadway
Midnight and Magnolias	David O. Selznick	2005	Off-Broadway
On the Twentieth Century	Oscar Jaffee	2005	Broadway
Music in the Air	Bruno Mahler	2009	New York, New York
The Addams Family	Gomez Addams	2011–2012	US National Tour
Ride the Tiger	Jack	2013	New Haven, Connecticut
His Girl Friday	Walter Burns	2013	San Diego, Los Angeles
Lady, Be Good!	J. Watterson Watkins	2015	Off-Broadway
Living on Love	Vito De Angelis	2015	Broadway
Anastasia	Vlad Popov	2015	Workshop
War Paint	Harry Fleming	2016	Chicago (World Premiere)
War Paint	Harry Fleming	2017	Broadway
Hey, Look Me Over!	N/A	2018	Off-Broadway
Dave	Chief of Staff Bob Alexander	2018	Washington, D.C.
Nantucket Sleigh Ride	Dr. Harbinger / Shuyler / Walt Disney	2019	Off-Broadway
Mack and Mabel	Mack Sennett	2020	Off-Broadway
Anyone Can Whistle	Comptroller Schub	2022	Carnegie Hall
The Frogs	Dionysos	2023	Lincoln Center

== Awards and nominations ==
Year	Association	Category	Project	Result	Ref.
1998	Tony Award	Best Performance by a Leading Actor in a Musical	The Scarlet Pimpernel	Nominated	
1998	Drama Desk Award	Outstanding Actor in a Musical	The Scarlet Pimpernel	Nominated	
1998	Theatre World Award		The Scarlet Pimpernel	Won	
1998	Outer Critics Circle Award	Outstanding Actor in a Musical	The Scarlet Pimpernel	Nominated	
2015	Drama League Awards	Distinguished Performance Award	Living on Love	Nominated	
2023	Screen Actors Guild Awards	Outstanding Ensemble in a Drama Series	The Gilded Age	Nominated	
