= Kate Baldwin =

American singer

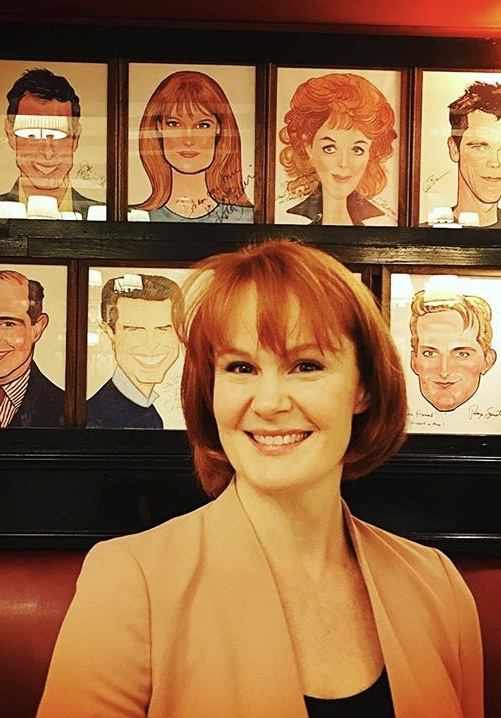
- Baldwin in 2017
- Born: Katherine Baldwin; May 2, 1975 (age 51); Evanston, Illinois, U.S.
- Education: Northwestern University
- Occupations: Singer; actress
- Years active: 1998–present
- Spouse: Graham Rowat (m. 2005)
- Children: 1

Katherine Baldwin (born May 2, 1975) is an American singer and actress known for her work in musical theater. She received a Tony Award nomination for her work in the 2009 Broadway revival of Finian's Rainbow. She also co-starred opposite Bette Midler, David Hyde Pierce, and Gavin Creel in the Broadway revival of Hello, Dolly!, for which she received Tony, Drama Desk, and Outer Critics Circle award nominations for her work as Irene Molloy. Baldwin continued with the production until it closed in August 2018.

== Early life ==
Born in Evanston, Illinois, Baldwin graduated from Shorewood High School in Shorewood, Wisconsin in 1993, and from the theatre program at Northwestern University in 1997.

During her four years at Northwestern, she performed in seventeen university stage productions and studied voice with Marie Michuda, who helped to make Baldwin a versatile performer. In March of her senior year, Baldwin auditioned for the musical Baby which was being produced at the Marriott Lincolnshire Theatre, in Lincolnshire, Illinois, and obtained her Equity card for her work in the production. She stayed in the Chicago area, performing in multiple other Marriott Lincolnshire productions, before moving to New York City.

== Career ==
Baldwin made her Broadway debut as a swing in the original Broadway production of The Full Monty (2000). Additional Broadway credits include:

- Thoroughly Modern Millie (2002) - Daphne/Lucille, Miss Dorothy Understudy
- Wonderful Town revival (2004) - Helen [Replacement]
- Finian's Rainbow revival (2009) - Sharon McLonergan (Tony, Drama Desk, Outer Critic's Circle noms)
- Big Fish (2013) - Sandra Bloom
- Hello, Dolly! revival (2017) - Irene Molloy (Tony, Drama Desk, Outer Critic's Circle noms)
- Chicago revival (2025) - Roxie Hart [Replacement]

Baldwin's off-Broadway credits include:

- Babes in Arms**
- A Connecticut Yankee**
- Bloomer Girl**
- Bush is Bad
- Finian's Rainbow**
- Giant (Drama Desk nom)
- John & Jen (Drama Desk nom)
- Songbird
- Superhero (Lucille Lortel nom)
- Love Life**

** notes Encores! New York City Center performance

Along with all of her Broadway and Off-Broadway credits she has also accumulated an extensive amount of regional theater credits. One of the most notable being her portrayal of Nellie Forbush in the 2002 Arena Stage production of South Pacific, for which she was nominated for a Helen Hayes Award. Additional credits include She Loves Me, Guys and Dolls, Can-Can, The King and I, and many others.

Baldwin played the role of Sharon in the 2009 New York City Center Encores! staged concert production of Finian's Rainbow. The New York Times critic Charles Isherwood called her a "discovery" and praised her performance, noting she sang the role "beautifully... her rich, pure soprano riding the crests of the melodies with ease." She reprised the role in the Broadway revival that brought the Encores! production to the St. James Theatre in October 2009. Her performance received positive notices again, as well as a Tony Award nomination for Best Actress in Musical.

In October 2009, Baldwin released her first solo album, Let's See What Happens, a compilation of songs written by Burton Lane and E. Y. Harburg. More recently, she released an album dedicated solely to the work of the team, Jerry Bock and Sheldon Harnick, titled She Loves Him.

In the West End, the premiere of the new musical Paradise Found featured Baldwin in a production co-directed by Harold Prince and Susan Stroman at the Menier Chocolate Factory in London (May 19 – June 26, 2010). The Telegraph reviewer wrote of her performance: "The best performance comes from Kate Baldwin, who is both affecting and a succulent feast for the eye, as Mizzi."

Baldwin appeared in the Broadway revival of Hello, Dolly! as Irene Molloy, opposite Bette Midler. The musical opened at the Shubert Theatre on April 20, 2017, and closed on August 25, 2018.

In 2020, Baldwin was scheduled to appear in New York City Center's production of Love Life directed by Victoria Clark, and starring opposite Brian Stokes Mitchell. However, the production was postponed and then cancelled due to the COVID-19 pandemic. The show was brought back for the 2025 season of Encores! with Baldwin and Mitchell in their original roles.

In 2025, she appeared in the third season of The Gilded Age as Nancy Adams Bell', the sister of John Adams.

== Personal life ==
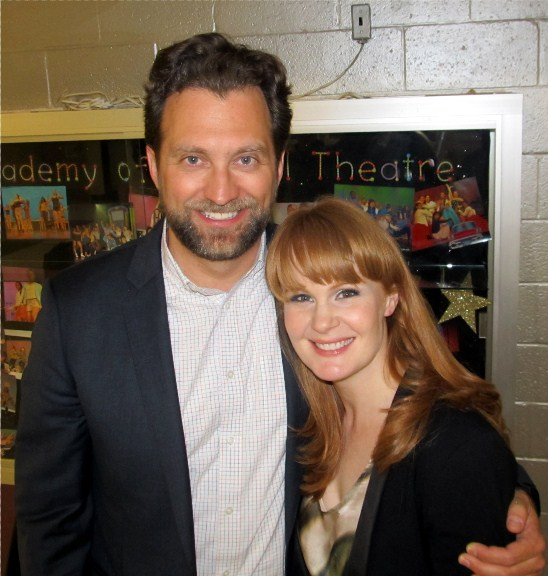
Baldwin and Graham Rowat visit Northwood High School in Silver Spring, Maryland as featured guests of ArtSpeak, 2014

Baldwin met her husband, actor Graham Rowat, in 2003 during a Washington DC production of 1776, in which he played Richard Henry Lee and she played Martha Jefferson. Because they both had a lot of downtime during act two of the musical, they bonded quickly and began dating after the show closed. They married on October 2, 2005, and on April 19, 2011, welcomed their son, Colin James. The husband and wife acting duo have done multiple regional shows together since 1776, including Bells Are Ringing and A Little Night Music.

== Stage ==
Year	Title	Role(s)	Venue	Notes	Ref.
2000	Thoroughly Modern Millie	Ensemble	La Jolla Playhouse		
2001	The Full Monty	Swing (replacement)	Eugene O'Neill Theatre, Broadway	Broadway debut	
2002	Thoroughly Modern Millie	Lucille, Daphne, Ensemble, understudy Dorothy Brown	Marquis Theatre, Broadway		
2002	Miss Saigon	Ellen Scott	Paper Mill Playhouse		
2002	South Pacific	Nellie Forbush	Arena Stage		
2003	1776	Martha Jefferson	Ford's Theatre		
2004	The Last Five Years	Kathy Hiatt	Repertory Theatre of St. Louis		
2004	Wonderful Town	Helen (replacement)	Al Hirschfeld Theatre, Broadway		
2005	Falsettos	Cordelia	Huntington Theatre Company		
2005	Behind the Limelight	Oona	New York Stage and Film		
2005	The Sound of Music	Maria Rainer	The Muny		
2005	Bush is Bad	Laura Bush, Valerie Plame, others	Triad Theater, Off-Broadway		
2005	White Christmas	Betty Haynes	Orpheum Theatre, San Francisco		
2006	Hello, Dolly!	Irene Molloy	Paper Mill Playhouse		
2006	Seven Brides for Seven Brothers	Milly	The Muny		
2006	White Christmas	Betty Haynes	Fox Theatre, Detroit		
2007	Henry V	Katherine of France	Shakespeare Theatre of New Jersey		
2007	The Three Musketeers	Milady de Winter	North Shore Music Theatre		
2007	White Christmas	Betty Haynes	Hummingbird Centre for the Performing Arts, Toronto		
2008	A Little Night Music	Charlotte Malcolm	Baltimore Centerstage		
2008	She Loves Me	Amalia Balash	Huntington Theatre Company		
2008	She Loves Me	Amalia Balash	Williamstown Theatre Festival		
2008	The Women	Mary Haines	Old Globe Theatre		
2009	Finian's Rainbow	Sharon McLongeran	New York City Center		
2009	The Music Man	Marian Paroo	The Muny		
2009	Finian's Rainbow	Sharon McLonergan	St. James Theatre, Broadway		
2010	Paradise Found	Mizzi Schinagl	Menier Chocolate Factory, London		
2010	I Do! I Do!	Agnes	Westport Country Playhouse		
2012	Giant	Leslie Lynnton Benedict	Dallas Theater Center		
2012	The Music Man	Marian Paroo	Arena Stage		
2012	Giant	Leslie Lynnton Benedict	Public Theater, Off-Broadway		
2013	Fiorello!	Thea Almerigatti	New York City Center		
2013	Big Fish	Sandra Templeton Bloom	Oriental Theatre, Chicago		
2013	Big Fish	Sandra Templeton Bloom	Neil Simon Theater, Broadway		
2014	A Little Night Music	Charlotte Malcolm	Berkshire Theatre Group		
2014	Can-Can	La Mome Pistache	Paper Mill Playhouse		
2015	John & Jen	Jen Tracy	Keen Company, Off-Broadway		
2015	Bells Are Ringing	Ella Peterson	Berkshire Theatre Group		
2015	Songbird	Tammy Trip	59E59 Theaters, Off-Broadway		
2016	The King and I	Anna Leonowens	Chicago Lyric Opera		
2016	Constellations	Marianne	Berkshire Theatre Group		
2017	Hello, Dolly!	Irene Molloy	Shubert Theatre, Broadway		
2019	Superhero	Charlotte Bronson	Second Stage Theater, Off-Broadway		
2022	The Bridges of Madison County	Francesca Johnson	Axelrod Performing Arts Center		
2022	The Karate Kid	Lucille	Stages St. Louis		
2022	42nd Street	Dorothy Brock	Goodspeed Musicals		
2023	What the Constitution Means to Me	Heidi Schreck	Berkshire Theatre Group		
2023	The Bridges of Madison County	Francesca Johnson	Bucks County Playhouse		
2024	A Little Night Music	Desiree Armfeldt	American Theater Group		
2024	Little Women (musical)	Marmee	Connecticut Stage Company		
2024	Follies	Sally Plummer	Carnegie Hall		
2024	The Prom	Dee Dee Allen	Sharon Playhouse		
2025	Love Life	Susan Cooper	New York City Center		
2025	Hello, Dolly!	Dolly Levi	Carnegie Hall		
2025	Chicago	Roxie Hart	Ambassador Theatre, Broadway		

== Awards and nominations ==
Year	Award	Category	Work	Result
2006	Kevin Kline Award	Outstanding Lead Actress in a Musical	The Sound of Music	Nominated
2010	Tony Award	Best Actress in a Musical	Finian's Rainbow	Nominated
2010	Drama Desk Award	Outstanding Actress in a Musical	Finian's Rainbow	Nominated
2010	Outer Critics Circle Award	Outstanding Actress in a Musical	Finian's Rainbow	Nominated
2013	Drama Desk Award	Outstanding Actress in a Musical	Giant	Nominated
2015	Drama Desk Award	Outstanding Actress in a Musical	John & Jen	Nominated
2017	Tony Award	Best Featured Actress in a Musical	Hello, Dolly!	Nominated
2017	Drama Desk Award	Outstanding Featured Actress in a Musical	Hello, Dolly!	Nominated
2017	Outer Critics Circle Award	Outstanding Featured Actress in a Musical	Hello, Dolly!	Nominated
2019	Lucille Lortel Awards	Outstanding Lead Actress in a Musical	Superhero	Nominated

== Additional credits ==
- Opening Doors concert, Zankel Hall, October 2004
- Miss Saigon, Paper Mill Playhouse, 2002
- Hello, Dolly!, Paper Mill Playhouse, June 2006
- Seven Brides for Seven Brothers, The Muny, St. Louis, August 2006
- The Pajama Game, The Muny, St. Louis, July 2007
- White Christmas, San Francisco, November 2005-December 2005 and Toronto, November 2007-January 2008
- She Loves Me, Huntington Theatre Company and Williamstown Theatre Festival, Massachusetts, May 2008-June 2008
- My Fair Lady, Sacramento Music Circus, August 2008
- The Broadway Musicals of 1927, "Broadway By the Year" February 22, 2010, The Town Hall, New York
