= The Explorers Club (play) =

Play

- Written by: Nell Benjamin
- Genre: Farce
- Setting: London, 1879

Premiere
- Date: June 20, 2013
- Place: New York City Center, New York City

The Explorers Club is a play written by Nell Benjamin. Set in 19th-century London, the farce depicts the chaos that ensues when a woman tries to gain entry to the fictional titular club of explorers.

It premiered off-Broadway in 2013 at New York City Center under the direction of Marc Bruni, receiving a moderately positive critical reception. It received an Outer Critics Circle Award for Outstanding Off-Broadway Play.

== Summary ==
The show takes place in London in 1879 and depicts Phyllida Spotte-Hume's attempt to become the first female member of the titular club of elite explorers. As evidence of her exploring prowess, she presents a blue-skinned native man (who she has given the name Luigi), brought back from a lost city she has discovered.

The club's president, botanist Lucius Fretway, who harbors a secret love for Phyllida, advocates for her admission, but other members stand in opposition, including the misogynistic "archeo-theologist" Professor Sloane.

At one point, the action is interrupted by the entrance of member Harry Percy, who announces he has returned from a successful expedition to the "East Pole".

== Development ==
The Explorers Club was Nell Benjamin's first full-length play, having previously been known for her work in musical theatre, particularly her Tony Award nominated score for the Broadway musical Legally Blonde. In an interview, Benjamin spoke of her love of comedy, citing Noises Off as one of her favourite plays and "probably the finest of all the farces". The idea for The Explorers Club began with a female high school friend of Benjamin's who went on to earn a PhD in astrophysics, which Benjamin imagined would have been "tough" for a woman. Benjamin contrasted her friend's career accomplishments as a scientist with what she described as "a dangerous anti-scientific, anti-intellectual streak that runs through the world". Ultimately, Benjamin says, the play is more about science than the historical mistreatment of women.

== Productions ==
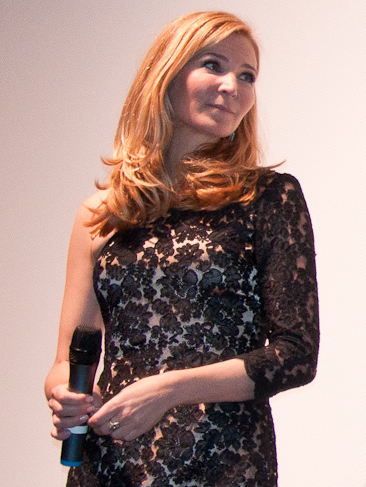
Jennifer Westfeldt (pictured here in 2011) played aspiring explorer Phyllida Spotte-Hume in the show's original Off-Broadway run.

The Explorers Club had its premiere off-Broadway on June 20, 2013, at Stage 1 of New York City Center. The show was directed by Marc Bruni and produced by the Manhattan Theatre Club. The cast included Jennifer Westfeldt as Phyllida, David Furr as Harry Percy, Lorenzo Pisoni as Lucius Fretway, and Carson Elrod as Luigi. Its final performance was August 4, 2013.

It has since been staged by a number of regional theatre companies in the US, including the Citadel Theatre in Chicago and the Delaware Theatre Company in Wilmington.

== Critical reception ==
Reviews for The Explorers Club were moderately positive, with many reviewers describing it as entertaining but lacking in substance. In a review for the New York Times, Charles Isherwood described it as an "occasionally funny but mostly blunt-witted comedy". He criticized repetitive elements in the play, writing that "when Ms. Benjamin hits upon a joke she likes, she keeps banging away at it as if it were a gong".

David Cote gave the show 4 out of 5 stars in a review for TimeOut New York, writing that "as a sweet summer concoction, this one goes down easy and gets you happy".

In a review for Variety, Marilyn Stasio called the show "wildly funny" and praised the cast as "pitch-perfect". She criticised Benjamin's resolution of the plot's obstacles as "too dryly methodical and much too busy".

Critics consistently praised the "superbly cluttered" set design by Donyale Werle, who furnished the explorers' clubhouse with leather chairs, burnished wood, taxidermied animals, and other "manly" artifacts.

== Awards and nominations ==
The Explorers Club received the 2013-2014 Outer Critics Circle Award for Outstanding Off-Broadway Play. It was nominated for the 2014 Drama Desk Award for Outstanding Play (losing to All the Way), with Donyale Werle also nominated for Outstanding Set Design.

The production was financially supported by a 2012 Edgerton Foundation New Play Award and a grant of $125,000 from the Alfred P. Sloan Foundation.
