= Superhero (musical) =

- Music: Tom Kitt
- Lyrics: Tom Kitt
- Book: John Logan
- Productions: 2019 Off-Broadway

Superhero is a musical with music and lyrics by Tom Kitt, and a book by John Logan. The musical premiered Off-Broadway in February 2019.

== Background ==
In July 2017, staged readings took place as part of the Eugene O'Neill Theater Center's National Music Theater Conference. The cast included Kelli O'Hara, James Snyder, and Kyle McArthur.

The song "I'll Save the Girl", featuring McArthur, was premiered online on January 8, 2019, in advance of the Off-Broadway opening.

== Productions ==
The world premiere of Superhero was announced on May 9, 2018 as part of the Second Stage Theatre 2018/19 season. The cast includes Kate Baldwin, Bryce Pinkham and Kyle McArthur (returning from the staged readings). Additional casting was announced on October 23. The production opened Off-Broadway on February 28, 2019 at the Second Stage Theatre, following previews from January 31. It is directed by Jason Moore. The musical has musical staging by Lorin Latarro, scenic design by Beowulf Boritt, costume design by Sarah Laux, lighting design by Jen Schriever, sound design by Brian Ronan, projection design by Tal Yarden, and illusion design by Chris Fisher.

== Synopsis ==
=== Act 1 ===
Simon Branson, a fifteen-year-old superhero-hero comic enthusiast, spends a lot of time on the fire escape of his building dreaming up stories and drawing superhero comics. He introduces the story with one of his comics ("Prologue/The Adventures of the Amazing Sea-Mariner"). Meanwhile, Charlotte Branson, Simon's mother laments on her son changing since his father, Charlotte's husband Mitch, died in an accident two years ago. Simon won't even visit the gravesite and avoids talking to his mother ("What's Happening To My Boy?"). Simon has a discussion with his building's landlord, who tells him that a superhero always makes a triumphant return, which inspires the second issue of his comic of the Sea-Mariner. As he is on the fire escape writing this issue of his comic, he notices someone on the roof of the building who appears to disappear in a streak of light ("The Adventures of the Amazing Sea-Mariner (Reprised)/You Don't Know What I Know"). With a suspicion that whoever was on the building was a superhero and little actual knowledge of him, except that he was a bus driver and lived in his building, apartment 4-B, Simon asks his Mom about who the man was. Charlotte only met the man briefly when she was returning his mail, as his mail was sent to her address by mistake. Simon is suspicious of his shy manner, but Charlotte thought that he seemed "nice" ("The Man in 4-B"). Later at school, we meet Vee, the girl Simon has a crush on, but not the courage to talk to. Simon makes an effort to make a stand against a bully in her defense while drumming up superhero fantasies, when the bully faces him, he regrets his decision and panics. Vee stands up in Simon's defense instead, protecting him from the same bully he tried to protect her from ("I'll Save The Girl"). Charlotte at home is folding laundry while lamenting her loneliness. In a passionate frenzy, she begins to cry while switching laundry batches in the laundry room, when she runs into Jim, the man in 4-B. Charlotte begins to think a lot about getting her life back in order and she begins to think more about Jim ("Laundry For Two"). The next song finds Jim and Charlotte both reflecting on how to socialize again. Both have been in isolation, lonely, and hiding from society. They meet on a date and hit it off immediately because they both shared the longing to share their life with someone else. However, near the end of their date, Jim makes a sudden run for it for an unknown reason, confusing Charlotte, while Simon watches and confirms his suspicions that there is something different about Jim ("How Do You Do This Again?/ You Don't Know What I Know (Reprise)").

=== Act 2 ===
Simon quizzes Jim about his super-powers. Jim says that, unlike in the movies, he's alone and can't always save everyone ("It's Not Like in the Movies"). When Charlotte tells him about her date and Jim's fast departure, Simon reveals nothing about Jim's true nature. The next day, Simon and Vee take a walk ("If I Only Had One Day"). Meanwhile, Jim apologizes to Charlotte for leaving, and they kiss ("In Between"). Simon and Charlotte imagine life with a superhero around ("My Dad, the Superhero"). Charlotte is again infuriated when Jim is again late to dinner ("It Happens to You"). She and Simon quarrel about Jim and about the way Simon handled Mitch's death. At the grave of her late husband, Charlotte makes peace with his passing, finally deciding on the words for his tombstone ("What are the Words?"). At the school assembly, Simon gives a visual comic book presentation and declares his feelings for Vee ("If I Only Had One Day (Reprise)"). Jim detects another person in distress and is forced to leave Charlotte. Vee tells Simon she only sees him as a friend. Charlotte breaks up with Jim, saying she needs somebody who can actually be there for Simon and for her. Jim tells Simon he is leaving town. Simon tells Charlotte he doesn't believe in heroes or hope anymore ("Superman is Dead"). Charlotte says she'll try to be his "superhero" ("Superhero"). They embrace each other as mother and son.

== Casting ==
Character	2019 Off-Broadway
Charlotte Branson	Kate Baldwin
Simon Branson	Kyle McArthur
Jim	Bryce Pinkham
Rachel	Julia Abueva
Dwayne	Jake Levy
Vee	Salena Qureshi
Vic	Thom Sesma
Dean Fulton	Nathaniel Stampley

== Musical numbers ==
Act 1

- "Prologue / The Adventures of the Amazing Sea-Mariner" – Simon, Ensemble
- "What's Happening To My Boy?" – Charlotte, Ensemble
- "The Adventures of the Amazing Sea-Mariner (Reprise) / You Don't Know What I Know" – Simon, Jim, Ensemble
- "The Man in 4-B" – Simon, Charlotte
- "I'll Save The Girl" – Simon
- "Laundry for Two" – Charlotte
- "How Do You Do This Again? / You Don't Know What I Know (Reprise)" – Charlotte, Jim, Simon, Ensemble

Act 2

- "It's Not Like In The Movies" – Jim, Simon
- "If I Only Had One Day" – Vee, Simon
- "In Between" – Charlotte, Jim
- "My Dad, The Superhero" – Simon
- "It Happens To You" – Charlotte
- "What Are The Words?" – Charlotte
- "If I Only Had One Day (Reprise)" – Simon
- "Superman Is Dead" – Simon
- "Superhero" – Charlotte

== Awards and honors ==
=== Original Off-Broadway production ===
Year	Award Ceremony	Category	Nominee	Result
2019
2019	Lucille Lortel Awards	Outstanding Lead Actress in a Musical	Kate Baldwin	Nominated
2019	Lucille Lortel Awards	Outstanding Featured Actor in a Musical	Bryce Pinkham	Nominated
2019	Lucille Lortel Awards	Outstanding Projection Design	Tal Yarden	Won
