= Donyale Werle =

American scenic designer

- Known for: Scenic design
- Awards: Tony Award for Best Scenic Design, Obie Award
- Website: http://www.donyalewerle.com

Donyale Werle is an American scenic designer from Nashville, Tennessee.

== Biography ==
Werle obtained her BFA in painting from the University of New Mexico and her MFA in set design from the Tisch School of the Arts at New York University. She has designed for multiple Broadway shows, including Bloody Bloody Andrew Jackson for which she received a 2011 Tony nomination. Her design for Peter and the Starcatcher won her the 2012 Tony award. She has also received 2011 Obie for Sustained Excellence of Set Design.

Werle did set design for the Thrillpeddlers in San Francisco for the 1996 production of Clive Barker’s Frankenstein in Love and the 1997 production of Mondo Andronicus.

Werle's designs focus on sustainability. She uses found objects, thrift shop finds, and many other materials she purchases second hand. She is the co-chair of the pre/postproduction committee for the Broadway Green Alliance. Her set design for the 2009 production of Broke-ology at the Lincoln Center featured a set built and decorated from products purchased at Habitat for Humanity's ReStores.

In 2017 Werle began studying horticulture and pursuing a Certificate in Horticulture through the Brooklyn Botanic Garden. In response to the COVID-19 shutdown of theatrical productions nationwide in 2020, Werle and her husband launched Theater/Gardens*NYC, a garden design and installation company.

In June 2020 students and alumni from the Department of Design for Stage & Film issued a letter to NYU demanding greater diversity within the department. Noting that while 50% of the students in the department are students of color, or international, over 90% of the faculty are white. In response to the letter, Werle resigned from her position as adjunct professor at the Tisch School of the Arts at New York University in solidarity with Andromache Chalfant. The resignations were designed to make room for BIPOC faculty to take their place.

== Personal life ==
Werle's studio and home is in Brooklyn, New York, where she lives with her husband Paul Jepson, a stagehand at the Brooklyn Academy of Music.

== Awards and nominations for theater ==
Year	Award	Show	Result
2022	USITT Distinguished Achievement Award for Scene Design and Technology	Achievement award	Won
2019	Broadway Green Alliance Green Broadway Award	Achievement award	Won
2016	Hewes Design Award for Outstanding Scenic Design	The Robber Bridegroom	Nominated
2014	Drama Desk Award for Outstanding Set Design	The Explorers Club	Nominated
2014	Hewes Design Award for Outstanding Scenic Design	The Explorers Club	Nominated
2012	Tony Award For Outstanding Scenic Design	Peter and the Starcatcher	Won
2011	Lucille Lortel Award for Outstanding Scenic Design	Peter and the Starcatcher	Nominated
2011	Lucille Lortel Award for Outstanding Scenic Design	Bloody Bloody Andrew Jackson	Won
2011	Tony Award For Outstanding Scenic Design	Bloody Bloody Andrew Jackson	Nominated
2011	Hewes Design Award for Outstanding Scenic Design	Peter and the Starcatcher	Nominated
2010	AUDELCO Award for Outstanding Set Design	Broke-ology	Nominated
2010	Hewes Design Award for Outstanding Scenic Design	Bloody Bloody Andrew Jackson	Won
2010	Outer Critics Circle Award for Outstanding Scenic Design	Bloody Bloody Andrew Jackson	Nominated
