= River Alexander =

American actor (born 1999)

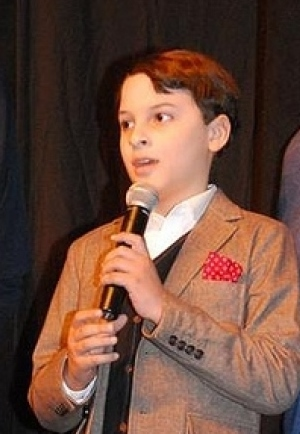
- Alexander at the 2013 Sundance Film Festival
- Born: November 29, 1999 (age 26); Southwest Ranches, Florida, United States
- Occupation: Actor
- Years active: 2010–present

River Alexander (born November 29, 1999) is an American actor.

== Early life ==
Alexander was born in Southwest Ranches, Florida. He attended American Heritage School in Plantation, Florida.

== Career ==
Alexander's first professional performance was on stage at the age of 11 in New York City at the Public Theater in the musical Bloody Bloody Andrew Jackson. He then went on to perform in the Broadway national tour of Billy Elliot the Musical. He has had several episodic roles on television. His first film role was in 2013's summer indie hit The Way, Way Back in the role of Peter. He was also in Boychoir, which was released in 2015.

== Filmography ==
=== Film ===
Year	Title	Role
2013	The Way, Way Back	Peter
2014	Boychoir	Rafael "Raffi" Abrams
2016	Teenage Cocktail	Nick Fenton
2018	Please Stand By	Sam
2021	This Is the Night	Dov Sabian
TBA	Slay	

=== Television ===
Year	Title	Role	Notes
2012	Person of Interest	Young Elias	Episode: "Flesh and Blood"
2012	2 Broke Girls	Shmuley	Episode: "And the Kosher Cupcakes"
2012	Gibby	Flip	Unaired Pilot
2012	The First Family	Sam Barrett	Episode: "The First Crush"
2013	The Gabriels	Josh Gabriel	TV movie
2013	Sam & Cat	Dilben	Episode: "#NewGoat"
2013	Mob City	Young Mickey Cohen	Episode: "Reason to Kill a Man"
2014	Good Luck Charlie	Paul	Episode: "Accepted"
2014	Family Guy	Kid (voice)	Episode: "Peter Problems"
2014	Rake	Louis Goodman	Episode: "Mammophile"
2015	Hot in Cleveland	Lance	Episode: "The Young and the Restless"
2015	Married	Griffin	Episode: "The Sandwich"

=== Stage ===
Year	Title	Role	Notes
2010	Bloody Bloody Andrew Jackson	Lyncoya	The Public Theater
2010	A Christmas Story: The Musical	Schwartz	5th Avenue Theatre
2011	Dani Girl	Marty	New World Stages
2011	Billy Elliot the Musical	Tall Boy	Broadway National Tour

== Discography ==
=== Cast albums ===
Year	Title	Role
2010	A Christmas Story: The Musical	Schwartz
2010	Bloody Bloody Andrew Jackson	Lyncoya

== Awards and nominations ==
Year	Award	Category	Work	Result
2014	Young Artist Award	Best Performance in a Feature Film - Supporting Young Actor	The Way, Way Back	Nominated
