= Lorin Latarro =

American choreographer

Lorin Latarro is an actor, dancer, choreographer, and theater director who has worked on Broadway and with The Metropolitan Opera.

== Life and career ==
Latarro graduated from the Juilliard School in 1997 with a Bachelor of Fine Arts degree in dance. Latarro has danced for the Martha Graham Dance Company, MOMIX, and Twyla Tharp. She made her Broadway debut as a replacement in the ensemble of the 1999 revival of Kiss Me, Kate. She also holds a Master of Arts degree from NYU.

Latarro has been nominated at the Drama Desk Awards, the Lucille Lortel Awards, the Outer Critics Circle Awards, and the Chita Rivera Awards. Latarro is on the Artists Council at Bucks County Playhouse.

Latarro has worked as an adjunct professor at Juilliard. She also founded the organization Artists Against Gun Violence, which put on works of protest art in 2013 and 2014.

== Personal life ==
Latarro's first marriage ended in divorce. She married Dr. Brian Harris Kopell, a neurosurgeon, in June 2015. They have a daughter, Arden.

== Stage credits ==
Year(s)	Production	Theatre	Role	Director	Choreographer	Performer	Ref.
1999	Kiss Me, Kate	Martin Beck Theatre	Swing	No	No	Yes	
2000	Swing!	St. James Theatre	Swing	No	No	Yes	
2002	Movin' Out	Richard Rodgers Theatre	Swing/Brenda Understudy	No	No	Yes	
2002	Man of La Mancha	Martin Beck Theatre	Fermina/Gypsy Dancer	No	No	Yes	
2003	Wonderful Town	Al Hirschfeld Theatre	Greenwich Villager	No	No	Yes	
2006	A Chorus Line	Gerald Schoenfeld Theatre	Vicki/Understudy for Cassie, Diana, Judy, and Sheila	No	No	Yes	
2006	The Apple Tree	Studio 54	Nadjira/King Arik's Court/Ensemble/Dance Captain	No	No	Yes	
2007	Curtains	Al Hirschfeld Theatre	Bambi Bernet	No	No	Yes	
2009	Guys and Dolls	Nederlander Theatre	Ensemble/Hot Box Girl/Mimi/Miss Adelaide Understudy	No	No	Yes	
2010	Fanny	New York City Center	Choreographer	No	Yes	No	
2010	American Idiot	St. James Theatre	Swing/Associate Choreographer/Dance Captain	No	Yes	Yes	
2011	How to Succeed in Business Without Really Trying	Al Hirschfeld Theatre	Swing	No	No	Yes	
2011	Company	New York City Center	Ensemble	No	No	Yes	
2011	Scandalous: The Life and Trials of Aimee Semple McPherson	Neil Simon Theatre	Choreographer	No	Yes	No	
2011	Tomorrow Morning	York Theatre	Choreographer	No	Yes	No	
2012	City Club	Minetta Lane Theatre	Choreographer	No	Yes	No	
2013	Hands on a Hardbody	Brooks Atkinson Theatre	Associate Choreographer	No	Yes	No	
2013	Waiting for Godot	James Earl Jones Theatre	Choreographic Movement	No	Yes	No	
2013	No Man's Land	James Earl Jones Theatre	Choreographic Movement	No	Yes	No	
2013	Rigoletto	Metropolitan Opera	Associate Choreographer	No	Yes	No	
2014	Queen of the Night	Paramount Hotel	Choreographer	No	Yes	No	
2014	21 Chump Street	Brooklyn Academy of Music	Choreographer	No	Yes	No	
2014	Kiss Me, Kate	Barrington Stage Company	Co-Director/Co-Choreographer	Yes	Yes	No	
2014	The Curious Incident of the Dog in the Night-Time	Ethel Barrymore Theatre	Associate Choreographer	No	Yes	No	
2015	The Odyssey	Delacorte Theatre	Choreographer	No	Yes	No	
2015	Company	Bucks County Playhouse	Choreographer	No	Yes	No	
2015	Beaches The Musical	Drury Lane Theatre	Choreographer	No	Yes	No	
2016	Waitress	Brooks Atkinson Theatre	Choreographer	No	Yes	No	
2016	God Bless You, Mr. Rosewater	New York City Center	Choreographer	No	Yes	No	
2016	Les Liaisons Dangereuses	Brooks Atkinson Theatre	Movement Director	No	Yes	No	
2017	Assassins	New York City Center	Choreographer	No	Yes	No	
2018	Chess	Kennedy Center-Eisenhower Auditorium	Movement Director	No	Yes	No	
2018	A Taste of Things to Come	Nederlander Theatre	Director/Choreographer	No	Yes	Yes	
2018	Twelfth Night	Delacorte Theatre	Choreographer	No	Yes	No	
2018	La Traviata	Metropolitan Opera	Choreographer	No	Yes	No	
2019	Superhero	Second Stage Theatre	Musical Staging	No	Yes	No	
2019	Almost Famous	Old Globe Theatre	Choreographer	No	Yes	No	
2019	Merrily We Roll Along	Laura Pel Theatre	Choreographer	No	Yes	No	
2019	Guys and Dolls	The Muny	Co-Choreographer	No	Yes	No	
2019	# DateMe: An OkCupid Experiment	Westside Theatre	Director	Yes	No	No	
2021	Waitress	Ethel Barrymore Theatre	Choreographer	No	Yes	No	
2021	The Visitor	The Public Theater	Choreographer	No	Yes	No	
2021	Is There Still Sex in the City?	Daryl Roth Theatre	Director	Yes	No	No	
2021	Mrs. Doubtfire	Stephen Sondheim Theatre	Choreographer	No	Yes	No	
2022	Into the Woods	St. James Theatre	Choreographer	No	Yes	No	
2023	Oliver!	New York City Center	Choreographer	No	Yes	No	
2024	The Who's Tommy	Nederlander Theatre	Choreographer	No	Yes	No	
2024	The Heart of Rock and Roll	James Earl Jones Theatre	Choreographer	No	Yes	No	
2024	Once Upon a Mattress	Hudson Theatre	Choreographer	No	Yes	No	
2025	Joy	Laura Pel Theatre	Director	Yes	No	No	
