= Carmen Cusack =

American actress

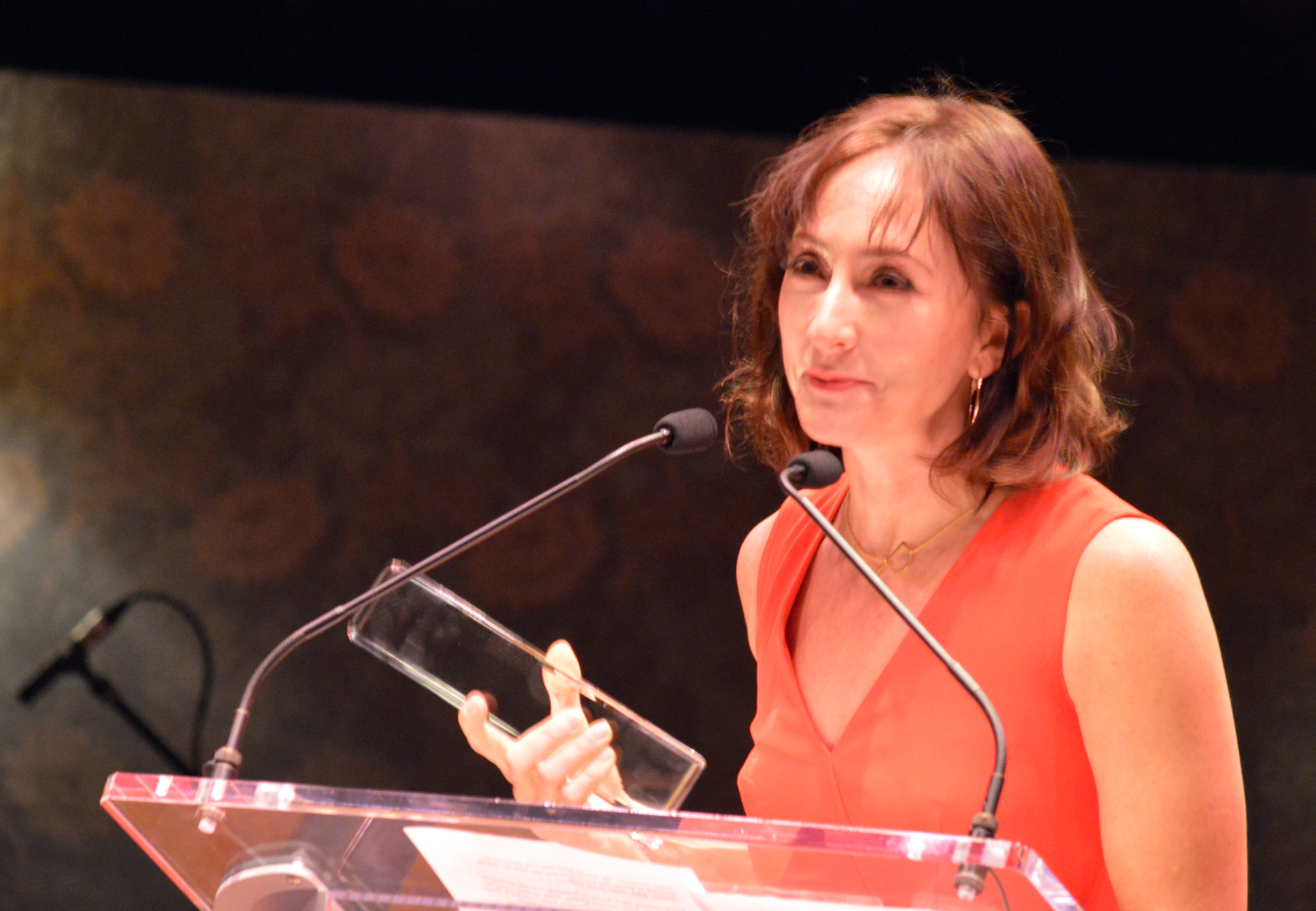
- Cusack at the 2016 Theatre World Awards
- Born: April 25, 1971 (age 55); Denver, Colorado, U.S.
- Education: University of North Texas
- Occupations: Actress; singer
- Years active: 1994-present
- Spouse: Paul Telfer (m. 2012)

Carmen Cusack (born April 25, 1971) is an American musical theater actress and singer. She is known for playing Elphaba in the Chicago, North American Tour, and Melbourne productions of the musical Wicked and for originating the roles of Alice Murphy and Clare Boothe Luce in the Broadway musicals Bright Star and Flying Over Sunset, respectively.

Her performance in Bright Star, which was her Broadway debut, was highly praised and earned her a Tony Award nomination and a 2016 Theatre World Award. She received a second Tony Award nomination for her performance in Flying Over Sunset.

== Biography ==
Cusack attended the University of North Texas and graduated with a performing arts degree. She trained in opera, ballet, jazz and tap. Cusack is married to Scottish actor Paul Telfer.

After completing her degree, Cusack accepted a job on the MS Queen Elizabeth 2, which changed the course of her career. In Manchester, England, she had her breakthrough role as Christine Daae in The Phantom of the Opera. Soon after this, she made her West End debut as Fantine in Les Misérables.

She also appeared in the original West End productions of The Secret Garden and Personals.

== Career ==
=== Wicked ===
Cusack returned to America, and on December 12, 2006, joined the Chicago production of Wicked as the standby for the lead role of Elphaba. Impressed with her portrayal of the character, the producers asked her to star in the lead role on the show's first national tour, beginning in November 2007. Her role as standby was taken over by Jennifer DiNoia.

Cusack began performances on tour, replacing Victoria Matlock, on November 6, 2007. She starred alongside Katie Rose Clarke as Glinda. After spending one year on tour, she left on November 2, 2008, and was replaced by Donna Vivino, who had been her standby.

Cusack was next seen in the Melbourne, Australia production, as the temporary standby for Elphaba. Amanda Harrison had taken a break from the show due to illness, and the standby, Jemma Rix, had been given the lead role. Cusack was with the company from June 10 to July 10, 2009. She exited the company to begin rehearsals for South Pacific.

=== Other roles ===
In 2009, Cusack played Nellie Forbush in the first national tour of South Pacific. Based on the 2008 Broadway revival, performances began September 18, 2009 in San Francisco. For this role Cusack was nominated for the Helen Hayes Award for Outstanding Lead Actress in a Non Resident Production.

In 2012, she played the role of Miss Gardner in the Off-Broadway revival of Carrie: The Musical, which began performances at the Lucille Lortel Theatre on January 31, 2012. Carrie played a limited run until April 8, 2012.

In 2013, Cusack played the role of Mother in the Milwaukee Repertory Theater's critically acclaimed production of Ragtime.

Cusack appeared as Dot/Marie in the Chicago Shakespeare Theater production of Sunday in the Park with George from September 26 to November 4, 2012, opposite Jason Danieley.

Cusack appeared as Annie in the production of the new musical First Wives Club, based on the film of the same name, beginning in February 2015. The musical played at the Oriental Theatre in Chicago, Illinois, through the end of March 2015.

Cusack portrayed Clare Boothe Luce in the new musical Flying Over Sunset, directed by James Lapine. The production, which was originally planned to open in March 2020, was delayed due to the COVID-19 pandemic and rescheduled to begin previews in November 2021 at Lincoln Center Theater's Vivian Beaumont Theater. The production opened on December 13, 2021 and closed on January 16, 2022. Cuscack's performance earned her a second nomination for the Tony Award for Best Actress in a Musical.

In July 2022, Cusack starred as Mrs. Lovett in The Muny production of Sweeney Todd: The Demon Barber of Fleet Street. She starred as Annie Savoy in the musical adaptation of Bull Durham, which opened in October 2025 at the Paper Mill Playhouse.

=== Bright Star ===
Cusack originated the role of Alice Murphy in the new musical Bright Star, written and composed by Steve Martin and Edie Brickell. She has been with the show since its workshop in July 2013 at the Powerhouse Theatre at Vassar College in Poughkeepsie, New York. Cusack performed in the show's world premiere at the Old Globe Theatre in San Diego in September 2014. She continued her role during its tryout run in Washington, D.C., from December 2015 to January 2016.

Cusack made her Broadway debut in Bright Star, which opened on March 24, 2016. For her performance, Cusack won a Theatre World Award. She also received nominations for the Tony Award for Best Actress in a Musical, the Outer Critics Circle Award for Best Actress in a Musical, the Drama League Award for Distinguished Performance, and the Drama Desk Award for Outstanding Actress in a Musical. Cusack reprised the role of Alice during the musical's North American tour stops in Los Angeles, San Francisco, and Salt Lake City.

=== Film and television ===
In 2018, Cusack appeared as Sabrina in James Ponsoldt's critically acclaimed Facebook Watch dramedy Sorry for Your Loss and was cast opposite Tom Hanks in Marielle Heller's Fred Rogers biopic A Beautiful Day in the Neighborhood. In 2019, Cusack was cast as a series regular on NBC's Zoey's Extraordinary Playlist. On August 27, 2019, it was announced that Lauren Graham had replaced Cusack on the show in the role of Joan.

== Selected Stage credits ==
Year	Title	Role	Notes
1994	The Phantom of the Opera	Christine Daae	National Tour, West End Production
1995	Les Miserables	Fantine	UK National Tour and West End Production
2000	Personals	Kim	Apollo Theatre, West End Production
2001	The Secret Garden	Rose	Aldwych Theatre, West End Production
2003	Les Miserables	Fantine	West End
2005	Saucy Jack and the Space Vixens	Chesty Prospects	West End Production
2006-07	Wicked	Elphaba (standby)	Regional, Chicago Production
2007-08	Wicked	Elphaba	US National Tour, Emerald City
2009-11	South Pacific	Nellie Forbush	US National Tour
2012	Carrie	Lynn Gardner	Lucille Lortel Theatre, MCC Theatre, Off-Broadway
2012	Sunday in the Park with George	Dot/Marie	Chicago Shakespeare Theatre, Regional
2013	Ragtime	Mother	Milwaukee Repertory Theater
2014	Bright Star	Alice Murphy	Old Globe Theatre
2015	First Wives Club	Annie	Regional, Chicago
2015	Bright Star	Alice Murphy	Kennedy Center, Regional
2016	Bright Star	Alice Murphy	Cort Theater, Broadway
2016	Sunday in the Park with George	Yvonne/Naomi	New York City Center, Encores! Concert
2017	Bright Star	Alice Murphy	US National Tour
2019	Call Me Madam	Mrs. Sally Adams	New York City Center, Encores! Production
2021	Flying Over Sunset	Clare Boothe Luce	Vivian Beaumont Theatre, Broadway
2022	Sweeney Todd: The Demon Barber of Fleet Street	Mrs. Lovett	The Muny, St. Louis
2025	Three Summers of Lincoln	Mary Todd Lincoln	La Jolla Playhouse
2025	Bull Durham	Annie Savoy	Paper Mill Playhouse

== Awards and nominations ==
Year	Award	Category	Nominated work	Result
2011	Helen Hayes Award	Outstanding Lead Actress, Non-Resident Production	South Pacific	Nominated
2013	Joseph Jefferson Award	Actress in a Principal Role in a Musical	Sunday in the Park with George	Nominated
2016	Helen Hayes Award	Outstanding Performer, Visiting Production	Bright Star	Nominated
2016	Tony Award	Best Actress in a Musical	Bright Star	Nominated
2016	Drama Desk Award	Outstanding Actress in a Musical	Bright Star	Nominated
2016	Drama League Award	Distinguished Performance	Bright Star	Nominated
2016	Outer Critics Circle Award	Outstanding Actress in a Musical	Bright Star	Nominated
2016	Theatre World Award		Bright Star	Honoree
2017	Grammy Award	Best Musical Theater Album	Bright Star	Nominated
2022	Outer Critics Circle Award	Outstanding Actress in a Musical	Flying Over Sunset	Nominated
2022	Tony Award	Best Actress in a Musical	Flying Over Sunset	Nominated
