= Judith with the Head of Holofernes (Veronese) =

Painting by Paolo Veronese

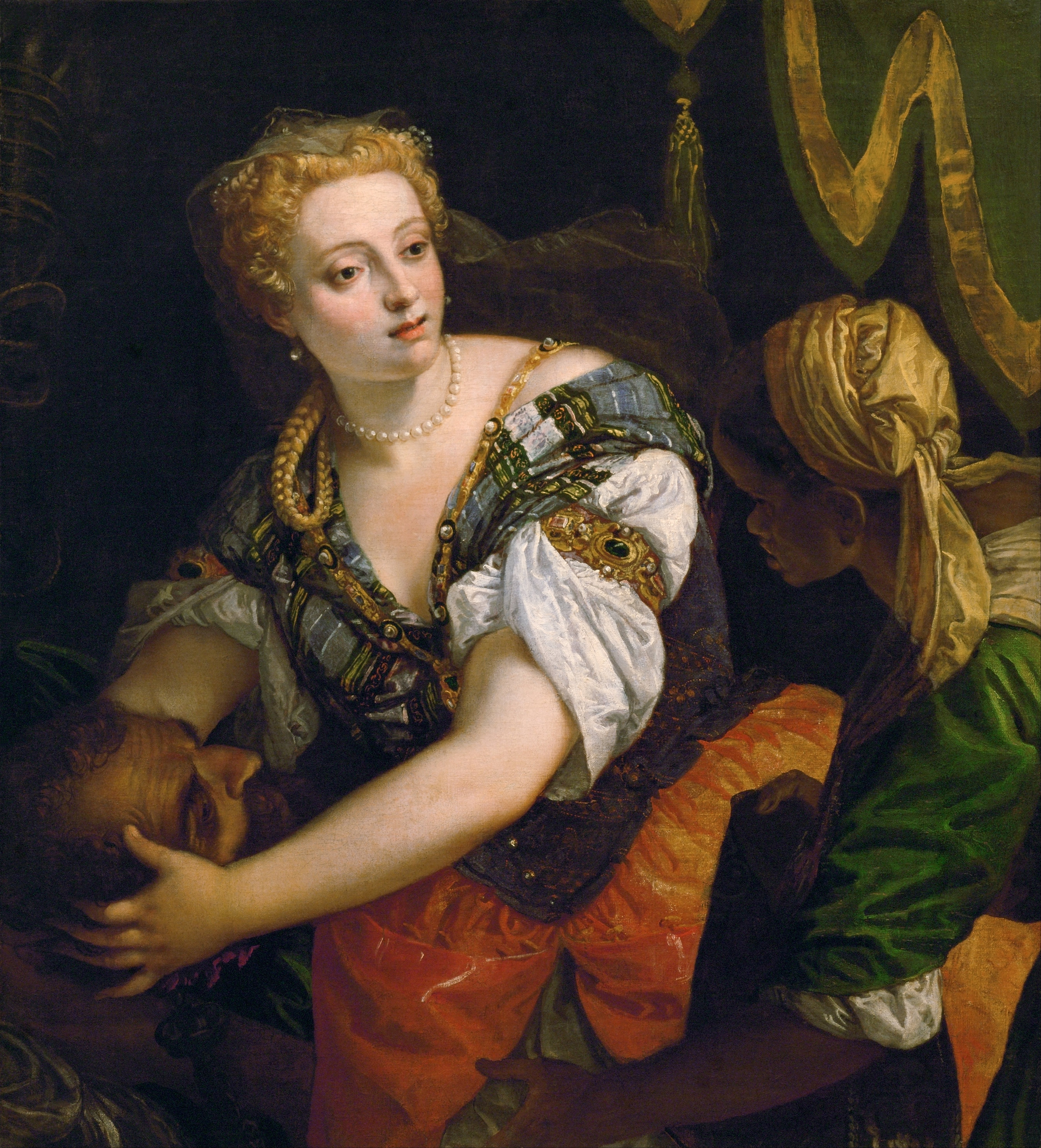
Judith with the Head of Holofernes (c. 1575–1580) by Paolo Veronese

Judith with the Head of Holofernes is an oil-on-canvas painting by Paolo Veronese created c. 1575–1580. It entered the collection of Archduke Leopold Wilhelm of Austria in 1659 and is now in the Kunsthistorisches Museum, in Vienna (inv. No. GG 34).
