= Drew Gehling =

American actor

- Gehling in 2026
- Born: Andrew Shearer Gehling; October 16, 1982 (age 44)
- Education: Carnegie Mellon University (BFA); Columbia University (PBD)
- Occupation: Actor
- Years active: 2005–present
- Known for: Waitress
- Spouse: Julia Mattison (m. 2023) Sara Jean Ford (m. 2009–2015)
- Children: 1

Andrew Shearer Gehling (born October 16, 1982) is an American stage and screen actor, best known for his role as Dr. Pomatter in the Broadway musical Waitress, Garry Marshall's Billy & Ray, and as the voice of Gord in the 2006 video game Bully from Rockstar Games.

== Biography ==
Gehling grew up in Sedgefield, North Carolina, performing as a child in several shows with the Greensboro Children's Theatre and Livestock Players Youth Theatre. He attended Carnegie Mellon University in Pittsburgh.

After graduating from Carnegie Mellon, Gehling booked “Snow White - An Enchanting Musical” at the Disneyland Resort.

Gehling made his Broadway debut as Bob Gaudio in Jersey Boys and went on to play Warren Smith in the Broadway revival of On a Clear Day You Can See Forever. He has performed Off-Broadway in A Minister's Wife and Anne of Green Gables. In 2016, he originated the role of Jim Pomatter in the musical Waitress on Broadway, where he remained until April 2, 2017. He returned to star alongside Betsy Wolfe on June 27, 2017. In May - June 2017, he starred as Joe Bradley in Roman Holiday at the Golden Gate Theatre in San Francisco.

He began starring in a new musical Dave at Arena Stage in Washington, D.C., on July 13, 2018, in the dual roles of Dave Kovic and President Bill Mitchell. The musical has music by Tom Kitt, lyrics by Nell Benjamin, and the book by Benjamin and Thomas Meehan.

Gehling joined the Off-Broadway cast of Little Shop of Horrors as Orin in March 2023. In June 2024, he was in the Encores! production of Titanic as Edgar Beane. In August 2024, he joined the cast of & Juliet as William Shakespeare on Broadway.

== Personal life ==
Gehling was previously married to fellow performer and Carnegie Mellon graduate Sara Jean Ford in 2009. They have one daughter together named Anne Kelly Gehling.

In 2010, Gehling experienced a loss of most of his vocal range due to the formation of calluses on his vocal cords. He partnered with Dr. Hayley Born to conduct a research study on the vocal health of professional and amateur singers. Gehling interviewed over 100 singers for the study. Some of the results from Gehling's fieldwork were published in a 2014 article in the Journal of Voice.

== Filmography ==
=== Film ===
Year	Title	Role	Note
2013	Muhammad Ali's Greatest Fight	Marshall's Clerk	
2019	The Day Shall Come	Bank Manager	
2022	Unconformity	Dr. Petro Stein	
2023	Waitress	Dr. Jim Pomatter	Live stage recording of musical

=== Television ===
Year	Title	Role	Note
2012	30 Rock	Bradley Tarkin Jr.	
2013	67th Tony Awards	Himself - Presenter	
2013	Smash	Bartender	
2016	Elementary	Caden Barrymore	
2018	Unbreakable Kimmy Schmidt	Danford	
2018	The Good Fight	Bartender	
2018	Dietland	Jack	
2018	Succession	Business Alchemist	
2019	The Code	Lt. Zephyr 'Tank' Tarkanian	
2021	The Blacklist	Skip Hadley	

=== Video games ===
Year	Title	Role	Note
2006	Bully	Gord Vendome	

== Stage credits ==
Year	Title	Role	Note
2006	Hello Dolly!	Ambrose Kemper	Paper Mill Playhouse
2007	Anne of Green Gables	Gilbert Blythe	Off-Broadway
2007	Jersey Boys	Bob Gaudio	Chicago
2009	The Happy Embalmer	Sherpa / Quad	Off-Broadway
2009-2010	Jersey Boys	Bob Gaudio	Broadway
2011	Barefoot Boy With Cheek	Roger Hailfellow	Workshop
2011	A Minister's Wife	Lexy	Off-Broadway
2011	On a Clear Day You Can See Forever	Warren Smith	Broadway
2012-2014	Jersey Boys	Bob Gaudio	Broadway
2014	Death Note: The Musical	L Lawliet	Workshop
2014	Billy & Ray	Studio Chief	Off-Broadway
2015	Waitress	Dr. Jim Pomatter	Regional Premiere
2016-2017	Waitress	Dr. Jim Pomatter	Broadway
2016	Roman Holiday	Joe Bradley	Workshop
2017	Roman Holiday	Joe Bradley	Golden Gate Theatre
2017-2018	Waitress	Dr. Jim Pomatter	Broadway
2018	The Secret Garden	Dr. Neville Craven	Pre-Broadway Lab
2018	Dave	Dave Kovic / President Bill Mitchell	Arena Stage
2018	Waitress	Dr. Jim Pomatter	Broadway
2019	The Scarlet Pimpernel	Robespierre / Prince of Wales	Lincoln Center
2019	Almost Famous	Jeff Bebe	Regional Premiere
2019-2020	Waitress	Dr. Jim Pomatter	Broadway
2021	Waitress	Dr. Jim Pomatter	Broadway
2022-2023	Almost Famous	Jeff Bebe	Broadway
2023	Little Shop of Horrors	Dr. Orin Scrivello & Others	Off-Broadway
2024	Titanic	Edgar Beane	Off-Broadway
2024-2026	& Juliet	William Shakespeare	Broadway
2027	Paddington the Musical	Mr. Brown	Broadway

== Bibliography ==
- Gehling, Drew; Sridharan, Shaum; Fritz, Mark; Friedmann, David R.; Fang, Yixin; Amin, Milan R.; & Branski, Ryan C. (May 2014). "Backstage at Broadway: A Demographic Study." Journal of Voice, 28(3): 311-315.
