= Almost Famous (musical) =

Musical by Cameron Crowe and Tom Kitt

- The Musical
- Broadway promotional poster
- Music: Tom Kitt
- Lyrics: Cameron Crowe; Tom Kitt
- Book: Cameron Crowe
- Basis: Almost Famous by Cameron Crowe
- Premiere: September 27, 2019: The Old Globe, San Diego
- Productions: 2019 San Diego; 2022 Broadway

Almost Famous is a 2019 stage musical with music by Tom Kitt, lyrics by Cameron Crowe and Kitt, and a book by Crowe. It is based on the 2000 film of the same name written and directed by Crowe.

Loosely based on Crowe's life, the musical follows a teenager who becomes a journalist for Rolling Stone magazine in the 1970s. The show debuted in San Diego at The Old Globe in 2019, with previews beginning on September 13 and a premiere on September 27. It ran through October 27. Creative work continued during the COVID-19 shutdown. Like the film, the musical begins in the San Diego, home of the Miller family, progresses to the San Francisco offices of Rolling Stone, and then travels through the United States on tour with the fictional band Stillwater.

The Broadway production began previews on October 3, 2022, and opened November 3, 2022 at the Bernard B. Jacobs Theatre to mainly negative reviews. On December 19, it was announced that the show would close on January 8, 2023, after 30 previews and 77 performances. Critics thought the story didn't perform well on stage. The New York Times said the show was “too faithful to the movie to feel new, yet too staged to feel authentic.” Viewers also complained that the score lacked originality and memorability, but despite the poor reception, it received a nomination for Best Original Score at the 76th Tony Awards.

In November 2023, Kitt and Crowe reworked Almost Famous during a residency at the Eugene O'Neill Theater Center in Waterford, Connecticut. Public readings of the workshop were given on November 11, 15, and 18. The workshop has not yet received public reviews.

== Cast and characters ==
Character	San Diego	Broadway	O'Neill Center Reading^{1}
Character	2019	2022	2023
William Miller	Casey Likes	Casey Likes	Brayden Bambino
Penny Lane	Solea Pfeiffer	Solea Pfeiffer	Lola Tung
Russell Hammond	Colin Donnell	Chris Wood	Alex Boniello
Elaine Miller	Anika Larsen	Anika Larsen	Anika Larsen
Jeff Bebe	Drew Gehling	Drew Gehling	Damon Daunno
Lester Bangs	Rob Colletti	Rob Colletti	Rob Colletti
Anita Miller	Emily Schultheis	Emily Schultheis	Katy Geraghty
Sapphire	Katie Ladner	Katie Ladner	Katy Geraghty
David Felton	Van Hughes	Van Hughes	
Estrella	Julia Cassandra	Julia Cassandra	Julia Cassandra
Polexia	Storm Lever	Jana Djenne Jackson	Jana Djenne Jackson
Darryl	Daniel Sovich	Daniel Sovich	Blaine Alden Krauss
Silent Ed	Brandon Contreras	Brandon Contreras	Blaine Alden Krauss
Dick Roswell	Gerard Canonico	Gerard Canonico	Gerard Canonico
Larry Fellows	Matt Bittner	Matt Bittner	Kelvin Moon Loh
Ben Fong-Torres	Matthew C. Yee	Matthew C. Yee	Kelvin Moon Loh
Vic Nettles	Chad Burris	Chad Burris	Chad Burris
Dennis Hope	Sam Gravitte	Jakeim Hart	Chad Burris
Leslie	Libby Winters	Libby Winters	Julia Cassandra

^{1}Reading was presented with a cast of 13, with most actors playing multiple roles.

== Musical numbers ==
Source: Playbill

Act I

- "1973" – William Miller, Elaine Miller, Company
- "Who Are You With?" – Estrella, Polexia, Sapphire, Penny Lane, William Miller
- "Ramble On" – Stillwater, William Miller, Company
- "Penny and William" – Penny Lane, William Miller †
- "Fever Dog" – Stillwater ‡
- "Morocco" – Penny Lane, William Miller
- "1973" (reprise) – Full Company †
- "He Knows Too Little (And I Know Too Much)" – Elaine Miller +
- "It's All Happening" – Penny Lane, William Miller, Ensemble
- "Everybody's Coming Together" – Full Company
- "The Night-Time Sky's Got Nothing on You" – Russell Hammond, Penny Lane
- "No Friends" – William Miller, Ensemble
- "Simple Man" – Jeff Bebe, Russell Hammond
- "Something Real" – Russell Hammond, William Miller, Ensemble
- "Tiny Dancer" – Full Company

Act II

- "Stick Around" – Ensemble
- "Elaine's Lecture" – Elaine Miller
- "It Ain't Easy"/"It's All Happening" (reprise) – Estrella, Polexia, Sapphire, Penny Lane, William Miller, Jeff Bebe, Company
- "I Come at Night" – Stillwater †
- "Listen to Me" – Elaine Miller, Russell Hammond
- "The Wind" – Penny Lane
- "Higher Ground" – Full Company †
- "Lost in New York City, Pt. 1" – William Miller, Company
- "River"/"Lost in New York City, Pt. 2" – Penny Lane, William Miller, Company
- "The Real World" – Penny Lane, William Miller
- "Midnight Rider" – Russell Hammond †
- "Goodbye"/"New Day Coming" – Russell Hammond, Penny Lane, Company
- "The Night-Time Sky's Got Nothing on You" (reprise) – Russell Hammond †
- Finale: "Everybody's Coming Together" (reprise) – Full Company
- "Fever Dog Bows" – Full Company

† Not on Original Broadway Cast Recording
‡ Written for the film by Nancy Wilson
+ Included as bonus track on cast album, along with "Anything's Possible" sung by Solea Pfeiffer

== Awards and nominations ==
=== 2022 Broadway production ===
Year	Award	Category	Nominee	Result
2023	Tony Awards	Best Original Score	Tom Kitt and Cameron Crowe	Nominated
2023	Drama Desk Awards	Outstanding Music	Tom Kitt, AnnMarie Milazzo (vocal designer)	Nominated
2023	Drama Desk Awards	Outstanding Sound Design of a Musical	Peter Hylenski	Nominated
2023	Drama Desk Awards	Outstanding Wig and Hair	Campbell Young Associates	Nominated
2023	Theatre World Award		Casey Likes	Honoree
