= Tina Landau =

American playwright and theatre director (born 1962)

- Landau in 2026
- Born: May 21, 1962 (age 64); New York City, New York, U.S.
- Education: Yale University (BA); Harvard University (MFA)
- Occupations: Playwright; theatre director
- Years active: 2001–present
- Parents: Ely Landau (father); Edie Landau (mother)

Tina Landau (born May 21, 1962) is an American playwright and theatre director. Known for her large-scale, musical, and ensemble-driven work, Landau's productions have appeared on Broadway, Off-Broadway, and regionally, most extensively at the Steppenwolf Theatre Company in Chicago where she is an ensemble member. She attended Yale University where she met frequent collaborators Ted Sperling and Adam Guettel.

== Early life ==
Born in New York City to film and television producers Edie and Ely Landau, Landau moved with her family to Beverly Hills, California, where she graduated from Beverly Hills High School before attending Yale University, where she directed numerous productions as an undergraduate. She later attended the American Repertory Theater Institute for Advanced Theater Training at Harvard University. Her family is of Jewish background.

== Career ==
Landau's early work included site specific productions with New York City's En Garde Arts, including Orestes and The Trojan Women: A Love Story, both by Charles L. Mee, as well as her original play "Stonewall: Night Variations." Floyd Collins, with a book by Landau and a score by Adam Guettel, opened off-Broadway at Playwrights Horizons in 1996. Landau was nominated for the Drama Desk Award for Outstanding Book of a Musical and the Drama Desk Award for Outstanding Director of a Musical, and the production won the Lucille Lortel Award for Best Musical. A later version of the show played at San Diego's Old Globe Theater, The Goodman Theater in Chicago, and The Prince Music Theater in Philadelphia (where it was originally commissioned and produced.)

In 1997, she became a member of the Steppenwolf Theatre Company, where she has directed numerous productions including The Wheel, The Hot L Baltimore, Tarell Alvin McCraney's The Brother/Sister Plays and Head of Passes, The Tempest, The Time of Your Life (which later moved to Seattle Rep and A.C.T.), The Diary of Anne Frank, The Cherry Orchard, Theatrical Essays, Time to Burn, Berlin Circle, and The Ballad of Little Jo.

She made her Broadway debut directing the 2001 revival of Bells Are Ringing with Faith Prince, and in 2009 she returned to Broadway with the Steppenwolf production of Tracy Letts' Superior Donuts. In February 2015 Nickelodeon announced that she had been tapped to co-adapt and direct SpongeBob SquarePants, The Broadway Musical, a stage adaptation of SpongeBob SquarePants. The show opened on Broadway on December 4, 2017. For SpongeBob SquarePants, Landau was nominated for the 2018 Tony Award for Best Direction of a Musical at the 72nd Tony Awards. She won Best Director of a Musical at both the 2018 Drama Desk Awards and Outer Critics Circle Awards, and the production won for Best Musical in both awards as well.

Landau's other New York City directing credits include Old Hats (with Bill Irwin and David Shiner) at the Signature Theater, Paula Vogel's A Civil War Christmas at New York Theatre Workshop, Charles L. Mee’s Iphigenia 2.0 at the Signature, Dream True, Mary Rose, Miracle Brothers and Wig Out!, all at the Vineyard Theater, as well as In the Red and Brown Water, Space, and Saturn Returns all at The Public Theater.

Landau's many other regional credits include Antony and Cleopatra at Hartford Stage, A Midsummer Night's Dream at the McCarter Theater and Paper Mill Playhouse, Of Thee I Sing at Papermill, The Cure at Troy at Seattle Rep, Zack Zadek's Deathless at Goodspeed Musicals, and the musical Dave at Arena Stage.

In addition to Floyd Collins, Landau's writing includes book and lyrics for Dream True and States of Independence, both with scores by Ricky Ian Gordon, the plays Beauty at La Jolla Playhouse (San Diego Critics Best Play), Space at Steppenwolf, the Public, and the Mark Taper Forum (TIME magazine Top Ten), Stonewall: Night Variations, and 1969 (or Howie Takes a Trip). With Anne Bogart, Landau co-authored The Viewpoints Book: A Practical Guide to Viewpoints and Composition.

Landau has taught at Yale University and the Yale School of Drama, Tisch School of the Arts at New York University, University of Chicago, Northwestern University, and Columbia University.

In 2024, Landau directed Mother Play by Paula Vogel on Broadway. In 2025, she directed a revised Broadway production of Floyd Collins at the Vivian Beaumont Theater, as part of their 2024–2025 season. She directed and wrote the book and lyrics for Redwood on Broadway, starring Idina Menzel, with whom she conceived the musical.

== Awards and recognition ==
Landau was named one of the "Out 100 of 2009" by OUT Magazine. Landau was named a 2007 USA Ford Fellow and granted $50,000 by United States Artists, an arts advocacy foundation dedicated to the support and promotion of America's top living artists. In 2018 she won for Best Director at the 28th NAACP Theatre Awards. Landau received a 2018 Tony Award nomination for Best Direction of a Musical for SpongeBob SquarePants at the 72nd Tony Awards. She won awards for Best Direction of a Musical at the 2018 Drama Desk Awards and Outer Critics Circle Awards as well.

In 2022, Landau was featured in the book 50 Key Figures in Queer US Theatre, with a profile written by theatre scholar David Román.

== Credits ==
Selected Credits
Year	Production	Credit	Category	Ref.
1996	Floyd Collins	Director	Off-Broadway, Playwrights Horizons	
1997	Cloud Tectonics	Director	Off-Broadway, Playwrights Horizons	
1998	Saturn Returns	Director	Off-Broadway, The Public Theater	
1999	Space	Director	Off-Broadway, The Public Theater	
2000	The Ballad of Little Jo	Director	Regional, Steppenwolf Theatre	
2001	Bells are Ringing	Director	Broadway, Plymouth Theatre	
2004	Miracle Brothers	Director	Off-Broadway, Vineyard Theatre	
2004	Of Thee I Sing	Director	Regional, Paper Mill Playhouse	
2007	Mary Rose	Director	Off-Broadway, Vineyard Theatre	
2007	Iphigenia 2.0	Director	Off-Broadway, Peter Norton Space	
2008	Wig Out!	Director	Off-Broadway, Vineyard Theatre	
2009	Superior Donuts	Director	Broadway, Music Box Theatre	
2015	Big Love	Director	Off-Broadway, Signature Theatre	
2016	Old Hats	Director	Off-Broadway, Signature Theatre	
2016	Head of Passes	Director	Off-Broadway, The Public Theater	
2016	The SpongeBob Musical	Director	Regional, Nederlander Theater- Ford Center for the Performing Arts	
2017	The Doppelganger	Director	Regional, Steppenwolf Theatre	
2017	SpongeBob SquarePants	Director, Conceiver	Broadway, Palace Theatre	
2018	Dave	Director	Regional, Arena Stage	
2023	Mother Play	Director	Broadway, Hayes Theatre	
2025	Redwood	Director	Broadway, Nederlander Theatre	
2025	Floyd Collins	Director, Book, Lyrics	Broadway, Vivian Beaumont Theatre	

== Awards and nominations ==
Award	Year	Category	Work	Result	Ref.
Drama Desk Awards	1996	Outstanding Director of a Musical	Floyd Collins	Nominated	
Drama Desk Awards	1996	Outstanding Book of a Musical	Floyd Collins	Nominated	
Tony Awards	2018	Best Direction of a Musical	SpongeBob SquarePants	Nominated	
Drama Desk Awards	2018	Outstanding Director of a Musical	SpongeBob SquarePants	Won	
Outer Critics Circle Awards	2018	Outstanding Director of a Musical	SpongeBob SquarePants	Won	
Drama League Awards	2018	Outstanding Production of a Broadway or Off-Broadway Musical	SpongeBob SquarePants	Nominated	
Helen Hayes Awards	2019	Outstanding Direction in a Musical – Hayes	Dave	Won	
Tony Awards	2025	Best Revival of a Musical	Floyd Collins	Nominated	

== Notes ==
- Peterson, Jane T., and Bennett, Suzanne. Women Playwrights of Diversity: A Bio-Bibliographical Sourcebook, Greenwood Press, 1997. ISBN 978-0-313-29179-1
- Dominus, Susan. The 9 Habits of Highly Creative Directors, New York Times, September 4, 2005.
- Bogart, Anne and Landau, Tina. The Viewpoints Book: A Practical Guide to Viewpoints and Compositions. Theater Communications Group, 2005. ISBN 978-1-55936-241-2
- Hausam, Wiley, ed., The New American Musical: An Anthology from the End of the 20th Century. Theatre Communications Group, 2001. ISBN 978-1-55936-200-9
