= Stars in the House =

- Genre: Talk-show; Benefit concert
- Created by: Seth Rudetsky; James Wesley
- Presented by: Seth Rudetsky; James Wesley; Jon LaPook
- Theme music composer: Dana P. Rowe and Scott Logsdon (performed by Liz Callaway)
- Country of origin: United States
- Original language: English
- No. of seasons: 2
- No. of episodes: 444

Production
- Editors: Paul Ewen; Mark Ezovski
- Camera setup: Single-camera
- Running time: 60 mins

Original release
- Release: March 16, 2020 – present

Stars in the House is a daily live streamed web series created and hosted by Seth Rudetsky and his husband James Wesley to support The Actors Fund and its services. Created in the wake of the COVID-19 pandemic in the United States, Stars in the House debuted in March 2020.

Stars in the House is a combination of music, community, and education (from CBS Chief Medical correspondent Dr. Jon LaPook). Originally airing twice daily (at Broadway showtimes, 2 PM and 8 PM), it now streams daily at 8 PM ET across multiple platforms, including YouTube. The show features musical performances by stars remotely from their home and conversations with Seth and James between each tune. Viewers can also donate to the charity and interact with guests in real time. Stars in the House raised over $50,000 in the first four days of airing and plans to stream daily until Broadway re-opens. They have raised a total of $1,074,395 as of September 12, 2021.

As of March 8, 2021, they have also raised $203,337 for other 501c3s including The Trevor Project, You Gotta Believe, NAACP Legal Defense Fund, Cats4CovidRelief, Broadway at CBST, Greater Orlando Performing Arts Relief, Cancer Support Community, New York Gay Men's Chorus, Youth Pride Chorus, Tonewall, Bullets to Books, and Waterkeeper Alliance.

== Development ==
On March 12, 2020, New York Governor Andrew Cuomo and New York City Mayor Bill de Blasio enacted new restrictions to try to stop the spread of the Coronavirus, which at the time had already infected nearly 100 people. One of the restrictions was banning most gatherings of more than 500 people, which included all Broadway theaters. Quickly after, states like California and Illinois enacted similar guidelines. With thousands of actors instantly out of work and stuck at home, Rudetsky and Wesley came up with the idea as a way to both raise spirits and help those suffering.

The first show aired on Monday, March 16, with Tony Award winner Kelli O'Hara.

== Episodes ==
A complete list of archived episodes is available on The Actor's Fund's YouTube channel.

Season	Episodes	Originally released	
Season	Episodes	First released	Last released
1	376	March 16, 2020	March 13, 2021
2	TBA	March 14, 2021	TBA

== Segments ==
=== "Plays in the House" ===
Plays in the House are special episodes of Stars in the House, one-night only live readings of plays featuring the original performers. Plays in the House streams every Wednesday and Saturday at 2pm EST, Broadway's standard matinee time.

Play	Playwright(s)	Performer(s)
The Heidi Chronicles	Wendy Wasserstein	Joan Allen, Cynthia Nixon, Peter Friedman, Boyd Gaines, Ellen Parker, Joanne Camp, Anne Lange and Drew McVety
The Tales of the Allergist's Wife	Charles Busch	Faith Prince, Andrea Martin, and Richard Kind
Fully Committed	Becky Mode	Mark Setlock
Fuddy Mears	David Lindsay-Abaire	J. Smith-Cameron, Robert Stanton, Keith Nobbs, Patrick Breen, Marylouise Burke, Mark McKinney, and Lisa Gorlitsky
The Divine Sister	Charles Busch	Alison Fraser, Julie Halston, Amy Rutberg, Jennifer Van Dyck, and Jonathan Walker
Bakersfield Mist	Stephen Sachs	Brooke Adams and Tony Shalhoub
The Little Doug Laughed	Douglas Carter Beane	Julie White, Johnny Galecki, Zoe Lister-Jones, and Neal Huff
Arms & the Man	George Bernard Shaw	Christian Conn, Daniel Davis, Alison Fraser, Tom Hewitt, Ismenia Mendes, Lauren Molina, and Phillipa Soo
Motherhood Out Loud	Susan R. Rose and Joan Stein	Jayne Atkinson, Andréa Burns, Saidah Arrika Ekulona, Michel Gill, Justin Guarini, and Jane Kaczmarek
Candida	George Bernard Shaw	Andrew Keenan-Bolger, Andréa Burns, Santino Fontana, Renée Elise Goldsberry, Jay O. Sanders, Michael Benjamin Washington, David Staller
All in the Timing	David Ives	Nancy Opel and Robert Stanton
Free Speech	Gilbert L. Bailey ll, Nova Y. Payton, Ann Harada, Gabriel Brown, Orville Mendoza, Andréa Burns, Michelle Liu Coughlin, Jason Veasey, Pearl Sun, Antuan Magic Raimone, Nikky Walks, Awa Sal Secka, Samy Figaredo, Ines Nassara	
Blithe Spirit	Noël Coward	Merle Dandride, Angel Desai, Montego Glover, William Jackson Harper, Kendyl Ito, Thom Sesma and Leslie Uggams
Free Speech Volume 2	Devanand Jenki, Janelle Lawrence, James Edward Alexander, Valerie David, Nandita Shenoy, Riki Stevens, Bil Wright, Awa Sal Secka	
Macbeth	William Shakespeare	André De Shields, Donna Bullock, Rachel Crowl, Sherman Howard, Maurics Jones, Ty Jones, Linda Kenyon
Free Speech Volume 3	Peter Flynn, Lauryn Hobbs, Elliot Johnson, Dai Thompson, Mukta Phatak, Kalonjee Gallimore, Daja M. Rice, Naima Alakham, Brittany-Laurelle, Janelle Clayton, Jonathan Duvelson, Ronnita Freeman, Ashley Hurd, Elliot Johnson, Jonah Nash, Tavia Riveé, Grace Rivera, Vanessa Sierra, Justin Sudderth, Welinton Vallejo, Jasón Wells, Adrienne Witt	
Beautiful Thing	Jonathan Harvey	Natalie Toro, Kennedy Kanagawa, Cheech Manohar, Kuhoo Verma and Jason Veasey
Die, Mommie, Die!	Charles Busch	Charles Busch, Jennifer Cody, Brandon Contreras, Willie Garson, Ruth Williamson, BD Wong
Misalliance	George Bernard Shaw	Marc DelaCruz, Dan Dominguez, Midori Francis, Peter Francis James, Teresa Avia Lim, Jamie Sanders, Thom Sesma, Ryan Spahn and Sharon Washington, David Staller
Stick Fly	Lydia R. Diamond	Jelani Alladin, Caroline Innerbichler, Keith Randolph Smith, Tiffany Rachelle Stewart, Daniel J. Watts and Renika Williams
Caesar & Cleopatra	George Bernard Shaw	Jeff Applegate, Rajesh Bose, Brenda Braxton, Robert Cuccioli, Dan Dominguez, Jonathan Hadley, Mirirai Sithole

=== Television cast reunions ===
Show	Guests	Ref
Taxi	Marilu Henner, Judd Hirsch, Christopher Lloyd, Danny DeVito, and Carol Kane	
This Is Us	Chris Sullivan, Chrissy Metz, Mandy Moore, Ken Olin, and Susan Kelechi Watson	
Frasier	Kelsey Grammer, Peri Gilpin, David Hyde Pierce, Jane Leeves, Dan Butler, Bebe Neuwirth and Joe Keenan	
Barry	Henry Winkler, D'Arcy Carden, Sarah Goldberg, Stephen Root, and Anthony Carrigan	
Young Sheldon	Iain Armitage, Lance Barber, Zoe Perry, Annie Potts, Montana Jordan, and Raegan Revord	
Jessie	Debby Ryan, Peyton List, Skai Jackson, Karan Brar, Carolyn Hennesy, and Kevin Chamberlin	
Jesus Christ Superstar Live!	Brandon Victor Dixon, Alice Cooper, Jason Tam, and Norm Lewis	
Desperate Housewives	Marcia Cross, Eva Longoria, Dana Delany, Vanessa Williams, Brenda Strong, and Harriet Harris	
Glee	Matthew Morrison, Jane Lynch, Chris Colfer, Amber Riley, Darren Criss, Kevin McHale, and Jenna Ushkowitz	
SCTV	Eugene Levy, Catherine O'Hara, Martin Short, and Andrea Martin	
Zoey's Extraordinary Playlist	Skylar Astin, Peter Gallagher, Lauren Graham, Jane Levy, Alex Newell, Mary Steenburgen, John Clarence Stewart and Mandy Moore	
Difficult People	Julie Klausner, Andrea Martin, Billy Eichner, James Urbaniak, Gabourey Sidibe, Derrick Baskin, Shakina Nayfack and Cole Escola	
China Beach	Marg Helgenberger, Dana Delany, Robert Picardo, Jeff Kober, Nancy Giles, Concetta Tomei, Michael Boatman	
One Day at a Time	Valerie Bertinelli, Mackenzie Phillips, Glenn Scarpelli, Michael Lembeck, Norman Lear and Patricia Fass Palmer	
Dallas	Patrick Duffy, Linda Gray, Charlene Tilton and Steve Kanaly	
Melrose Place	Josie Bissett, Thomas Calabro, Marcia Cross, Laura Leighton, Heather Locklear, Doug Savant, Grant Show, Andrew Shue, Courtney Thorne-Smith and Daphne Zuniga	
Hollywood	David Corenswet, Darren Criss, Laura Harrier, Joe Mantello, Dylan McDermott, Jeremy Pope, Mira Sorvino, Holland Taylor and Samara Weaving	
White Collar	Sharif Akins, Matt Bomer, Hilarie Burton, Tim DeKay, Willie Garson, Tiffani Thiessen and Marsha Thomason	
Caroline in the City	Lea Thompson, Malcolm Gets, Amy Pietz, Eric Lutes, Andy Lauer, John Mariano, Tom LaGrua, Jason Workman and Marco Pennette	
The Flash	Tom Cavanagh, Grant Gustin, Jesse L. Martin, Danielle Nicolet, Danielle Panabaker, Candice Patton, Hartley Sawyer and Carlos Valdes	
Star Trek: Voyager	Kate Mulgrew, Robert Beltran, Roxann Dawson, Robert Duncan McNeill, Ethan Phillips, Robert Picardo, Tim Russ, Jeri Ryan and Garrett Wang	
Dr. Ken	Ken Jeong, Suzy Nakamura, Dave Foley, Jonathan Slavin, Tisha Campbell, Krista Marie Yu, Dana Lee and Albert Tsai	
30 Rock	Tina Fey, Scott Adsit, Jane Krakowski, Maulik Pancholy, Keith Powell and Jeff Richmond	
Crazy Ex-Girlfriend	Skylar Astin, Rachel Bloom, Donna Lynne Champlin, Scott Michael Foster, Pete Gardner, David Hull, Vella Lovell, Vincent Rodriguez III, Gabrielle Ruiz, Aline Brosh McKenna, Kat Burns, Jack Dolgen, Lucy Duckworth, Vinnie Rodriguez, Michael McMillan, Burl Moseley, Erick Lopez, Clark Moore, Vella Lovell, Danny Jolles and Esther Povitsky	
The Comeback	Lisa Kudrow, Michael Patrick King, Dan Bucatinsky, Lance Barber, Laura Silverman and Damian Young	
Scandal	Kerry Washington, Tony Goldwyn, Bellamy Young, Jeff Perry, Kate Burton, Dan Bucatinsky, Norm Lewis, Katie Lowes, Guillermo Díaz, Cornelius Smith, George Newbern, Joe Morton, Tom Verica, Scott Foley and Josh Malina	
L.A. Law	Michele Greene, Alan Rachins, Harry Hamlin, Corbin Bernsen, Susan Dey, Blair Underwood and Jimmy Smits	
Fame	Valarie Landsburg, Cynthia Gibb, Michael Cerveris, Lee Curreri, Loretta Chandler, Erica Gimpel, Jesse Borrego, PR Paul and Debbie Allen	
Knots Landing	Michele Lee, Donna Mills, Joan Van Ark, Ted Shackelford and David Jacobs	
Family Ties	Meredith Baxter, Michael Gross, Michael J. Fox, Tina Yothers, Brian Bonsall, Marc Price and Scott Valentine	
The Waltons	Richard Thomas, Michael Learned, Judy Norton, Eric Scott and Kami Cotler	
Star Search	Michael Berresse, Scott Fowler, Marty Thomas, Penny Mealing, Rosie O'Donnell and Sam Harris	
Grey's Anatomy	Chandra Wilson, Jim Pickens, Kim Raver, Kevin McKidd, Kelly McCreary, Anthony Hill, Camilla Luddington, Chris Carmack, Greg Germann, Richard Flood, Jake Borelli and Jessica Capshaw	
The Love Boat	Gavin MacLeod, Fred Gandy, Ted Lange, Bernie Kopell, Lauren Tewes, Jill Whelan, Charo Jones and Jack Jones	
The West Wing	Martin Sheen, Bradley Whitford, Allison Janney, Janel Moloney, Melissa Fitzgerald, Alan Alda, Jimmy Smits, Richard Schiff and Mary McCormack	
Little House on the Prairie	Melissa Gilbert, Rachel Lindsay Greenbush, Sidney Greenbush, Matthew Labyorteaux, Alison Arngrim and Dean Butler	
Thirtysomething	Timothy Busfield, Polly Draper, Mel Harris, Peter Horton, Melanie Mayron, Ken Olin and Patricia Wettig	
Cagney & Lacey	Sharon Gless, Tyne Daly, Martin Kove and Barney Rosenzweig	
ER	George Clooney, Julianna Margulies, Gloria Reuben, Noah Wyle, Laura Innes, Anthony Edwards, Alex Kingston, Goran Višnjić, Ming-Na Wen, Laura Cerón, Yvette Freeman, Conni Marie Brazelton, CCH Pounder	
Punky Brewster (2021)	Soleil Moon Frye, Cherie Johnson, Ami Foster, Casey Ellison, T.K. Carter	
Futurama	David X. Cohen, David Herman, Phil LaMarr, Lauren Tom	
Kate & Allie	Susan Saint James, Jane Curtin, Frederick Koehler, Allison Smith, Ari Meyers and Bill Persky	

=== Film cast reunions ===
Film	Guests	Ref
The Goodbye Girl	Quinn Cummings, Richard Dreyfuss and Marsha Mason	
Night at the Museum	Hank Azaria, Bill Cobbs, Steve Coogan, Patrick Gallagher, Carla Gugino, Shawn Levy, Mizuo Peck, Ben Stiller and Owen Wilson	
The Kids are All Right	Annette Bening, Josh Hutcherson, Julianne Moore, Mark Ruffalo, Mia Wasikowska, Lisa Cholodenko and Gary Gilbert	
Camp	Daniel Letterle, Joanna Chilcoat, Robin de Jesus, Sasha Allen, Tiffany Taylor, Steven Cutts, Tony Melson, Leslie Frye and Vince Rimoldi	
Hercules	Lillias White, Cheryl Freeman, LaChanze, Roz Ryan, Jon LaPook, Susan Egan, Tate Donovan, Danny DeVito and Roger Bart	

=== Musical cast reunions ===
Show	Guests	Ref
A Chorus Line	Kay Cole, Ronald Dennis, Patrica Garland, Nancy Lane, Baayork Lee, Robert LuPone, Donna McKechnie and Don Percassi	
Beetlejuice	Alex Brightman, Kerry Butler, Rob McClure, David Josefsberg, Leslie Kritzer, Will Blum, and Presley Ryan	
Cats	Betty Buckley, Charlotte d'Amboise, Donna King, Terrence Mann and Ken Page	
City of Angels	Gregg Edelman, Randy Graff, Dee Hoty, Kay McClelland, James Naughton, Rachel York and David Zippel	
Dear Evan Hansen	Gabrielle Carrubba, Jordan Fisher, Michael Greif, Steven Levenson, Christiane Noll and Jessica Phillips	
Fun Home	Michael Cerveris, Judy Kuhn, Sydney Lucas, Beth Malone and Emily Skeggs	
Les Misérables	John Caird, Anthony Crivello, Randy Graff, Judy Kuhn, Michael Maguire, Terrence Mann, Trevor Nunn and Frances Ruffelle	
The Phantom of the Opera	Sierra Boggess, Patti Cohenour, Ali Ewoldt, Ramin Karimloo, Norm Lewis, Rebecca Luker, Howard McGillin, Hugh Panaro and Gay Willis	
Urinetown	Hunter Foster, Spencer Kayden, Jeff McCarthy, Nancy Opel and Jennifer Laura Thompson	
Cry Baby	Harriet Harris, Christopher Hanke, Chester Gregory, James Snyder, Elizabeth Stanley and Alli Mauzey	
Avenue Q	Jordan Gelber, Stephanie D'Abruzzo, Jennifer Barnhart, John Tartaglia, Lillias White, Ann Haada and Rick Lyon	
Freestyle Love Supreme	Arthur Lewis, Kaila Mullady, Aneesa Folds, Andrew Bancroft, Anthony Veneziale, Tarik R. Davis and Chris Sullivan	
Newsies	Jeremy Jordan, Kara Lindsay, Andrew Keenan-Bolger, Aisha de Haas and Ben Fankhauser	
Jon & Jen	Carolee Carmelo, James Ludwig, Andrew Lippa and Tom Greenwald	
Carrie	Betty Buckley, Lawrence D. Cohen, Charlotte d'Amboise, Michael Gore, Linzi Hateley, Dean Pitchford and Sally Ann Triplett	
Pippin	Charlotte d'Amboise, Rachel Bay Jones, Terrence Mann, Andrea Martin and Matthew James Thomas	
Smokey Joe's Cafe	Brenda Braxton, Ken Hanson, Adrian Bailey, Frederick Owens, Ken Ard, Deedee Lively, Bob Torti and Deb Lyons	
Curtains	Kai Tsurumaki, Rupert Holmes, Scott Ellis, Edward Hibbert, David Loud, Jill Paice, David Hyde Pierce, Debra Monk and Karen Ziemba	
Flower Drum Song	Jose Llana, Baayork Lee, Alvin Ing and David Henry Hwang	
Be More Chill	Ella Gantman, Joe Iconis, George Salazar, Will Roland, Jason Tam, Tiffany Mann, Britton Smith, Lauren Marcus, Katlyn Carlson, Gerard Canonico, Cameron Bond, Jason Sweetooth, Troy Iwata, Talia Suskauer, Joel Waggoner and Stephanie Hsu	
Mamma Mia!	Kennedy Mattes, Judy Kaye, Karen Mason, Louise Pitre and Tina Maddigan	
Next to Normal	Louis Hobson, Adam Chanler-Berat, Bobby Spencer, Alice Ripley, Aaron Tveit and Jennifer Damiano	
The 25th Annual Putnam County Spelling Bee	Lilia Scudamore, Dan Fogler, Deborah S. Craig, Sarah Saltzberg, Jesse Tyler Ferguson, Jose Llana, Lisa Howard, Derrick Baskin, Celia Keenan-Bolger and Jay Reiss	
Jerome Robbins' Broadway	Faith Prince, Debbie Gravitte, MaryAnn Lamb, Susann Fletcher, JoAnn M. Hunter, Charlotte d'Amboise, Jason Alexander, Scott Frankel, Michael Kubala, Robert LaFosse, Paul Gemignani, Jerry Mitchell, Tom Robbins and Scott Wise	
Sweeney Todd	Len Cariou, Victor Garber, Sarah Rice and Ken Jennings	
Fidler Afn Dakh	Joel Grey, Samantha Hahn, Steven Skybell, and Rachel Zatcoff	
Bandstand	Laura Osnes, Joey Pero, Beth Leavel and Corey Cott	
Elegies	Bill Russell, Janet Hood, Marisha Wallace, Justin Ross Cohen, J. Harrison Ghee, Jayne Houdyshell, Vicki Lewis and Robin Lord Taylor	
Seussical	Lynn Ahrens, Stephen Flaherty, Michele Pawk, Janine LaManna, Anthony Hall, Sharon Wilkins and Kevin Chamberlin	
Baby	Liz Callaway, Richard Maltby Jr., David Shire, Todd Graff, Beth Fowler, Catherine Cox, and Martin Vidnovic	
Floyd Collins	Jason Danieley, Chris Innvar, Martin Moran, Theresa McCarthy, Cass Morgan, Jesse Lenat, Tina Landau and Adam Guettel	
Ragtime	Lynn Ahrens, Stephen Flaherty, Peter Friedman, Mark Jacoby, Judy Kaye, Audra McDonald, Brian Stokes Mitchell and Steven Sutcliffe	
Rock of Ages	Kerry Butler, Constantine Maroulis, Adam Dannheisser and Frankie Grande	
Cougar: The Musical	Brenda Braxton, Dustin Cross, Donna Moore, Marry Mossberg and Babara Winn	
Assassins	Michael Cerveris, Greg Germann, Annie Golden, Terrence Mann, Debra Monk, Anne L. Nathan, Lee Wilkof and Jerry Zaks	
The Producers	Nathan Lane, Matthew Broderick, Cady Huffman, Brad Oscar, Susan Stroman and Mel Brooks	
The Mystery of Edwin Drood	Donna Murphy, Judy Kuhn, Patti Cohenour, Betty Buckley, Rupert Holmes, Howard McGillin and John Herrera	
Cinderella	Peter Bartlett, Victoria Clark, Santino Fontana, Ann Harada, Harriet Harris, Laura Osnes and Phumzile Sojola	
Anastasia	Christy Altomare, Derek Klena, Max von Essen, Mary Beth Peil, John Bolton, Caroline O'Connor	
Motown	Charl Brown	
Annie	Andrea McArdle, Sarah Jessica Parker	
Godspell	Stephen Schwartz and the players: Bob Garrett, Peggy Gordon, Joanne Jonas, Gilmer McCormick, Don Scardino, Mark Planner and George Salazar (Broadway revival)	
Here Lies Love	Ruthie Ann Miles, Conrad Ricamora, Joshua Dela Cruz, etc.	
Dreamgirls Benefit Concert	Audra McDonald, Lillias White, Heather Headley, Darius DeHaas, Tamara Tunie, Brenda Braxton	
The Light in the Piazza	Matthew Morrison, Victoria Clark, Kelli O'Hara, etc.	
Guys and Dolls	Nathan Lane, Faith Prince, Walter Bobbie, Peter Gallagher, Ruth Williamson, Josie de Guzman, Jerry Zaks	
Sunday in the Park with George	Bernadette Peters and James Lapine	
Fosse	Doug Besterman, Andy Blankenbuehler, Marc Calamia, Parker Esse, Mary Ann Lamb, Lainie Sakakura and Sergio Trujillo	
Merrily We Roll Along	Jim Walton, Lonny Price, Jason Alexander, Ann Morisson	

=== Broadway Memorabilia Auction ===
In addition to direct donations made to The Actor's Fund, viewers can also contribute by bidding on memorabilia donated directly from the stars themselves. Items have included Tina Fey's old headshot, Betty Buckley's original wig from Cats, and a gown worn by Kristin Chenoweth.
