= David Loud =

American musician (born 1961)

- Born: November 28, 1961 (age 64); Cincinnati, Ohio, U.S.
- Education: Yale University
- Occupations: music supervisor, music director, conductor, vocal and dance arranger, pianist and actor
- Known for: Works with Kander and Ebb and Stephen Sondheim
- Notable work: The Visit, Sondheim on Sondheim, Ragtime, Steel Pier, The Scottsboro Boys, And the World Goes 'Round, Curtains

David Loud (born November 28, 1961, in Cincinnati, Ohio) is an American music supervisor, music director, conductor, vocal and dance arranger, pianist and actor. He is best known for his collaborations with and interpretations of the music of both Kander and Ebb and Stephen Sondheim.

== Biography ==
Loud recalls being interested in musicals at a young age:

I started as a pianist at six years old. I always played piano, and I started music directing shows in seventh grade. We did Gilbert & Sullivan shows that I would teach everyone the parts for and force everyone to sing. I used to save up all my money and come to New York, sleep on my grandmother's couch, see eight shows in a week, and go to Sardi's at the end of the week. She was a real theatre nut too.

He received a degree in music from Yale University in New Haven, Connecticut. It was during his sophomore year at Yale that Loud auditioned for and was cast in Harold Prince's original 1981 Broadway production of Sondheim's Merrily We Roll Along as Ted, the onstage pianist. The production ran for 52 previews and 16 performances before closing; Loud returned to Yale to finish his degree. Returning to New York in 1984, he was cast as the Narrator/Pianist in a production of Billy Bishop Goes to War, starring then-actor Scott Ellis. His association with Ellis led to many of his subsequent collaborations. In 1995 he originated the role of Manny in the original Broadway production of Terrence McNally's Master Class, starring Zoe Caldwell and Audra McDonald.

Loud occupies a unique place in Broadway history, originating three roles as an actor, and also serving as conductor, music director or vocal arranger for many musicals. Highlights of his music directing career include the hit Off-Broadway production of And the World Goes 'Round, the Roundabout Theatre Company's revival of She Loves Me, the Kander & Ebb concert, First You Dream, which was recently broadcast on PBS, and the original Broadway productions of Ragtime, Sondheim on Sondheim, Steel Pier, Curtains, and The Scottsboro Boys. He served as music supervisor for the Broadway revival of Porgy & Bess, and he conducted the incidental music for Mike Nichols' revival of Death of a Salesman. Other recent projects include The Landing and Kid Victory at the Vineyard Theatre, the Sondheim staged concert revue A Bed and a Chair at Encores!, featuring Wynton Marsalis and the Jazz at Lincoln Center Orchestra in November 2013, Little Dancer at The Kennedy Center, and The Visit on Broadway.

He created four shows for the 92nd Street Y's Lyrics & Lyricists program: "Let's Misbehave: the Sensational songs of Cole Porter," "A Good Thing Going: the Stephen Sondheim and Harold Prince Collaboration," On A Clear Day: The Musical Vision of Burton Lane, and Taking a Chance on Love: The Music of Vernon Duke. His arrangements have been heard at Carnegie Hall, The Hollywood Bowl, The Kennedy Center, Merkin Hall, and at Lincoln Center for the Performing Arts' Allen Room. Loud has also enjoyed a long professional relationship with Marin Mazzie and Jason Danieley, whose evening of duets, Opposite You, he created. They performed it at Feinstein's, Joe's Pub, Lincoln Center for the Performing Arts' Kaplan Penthouse, and around the country. The album was recorded by PS Classics. Other recent albums include Jerome Kern: The Land Where the Good Songs Go and Noël and Cole.

Loud has been on the faculty of the Yale School of Drama and Fordham University. He is currently on the faculty of the Manhattan School of Music.
