= Marin Mazzie =

American actress (1960–2018)

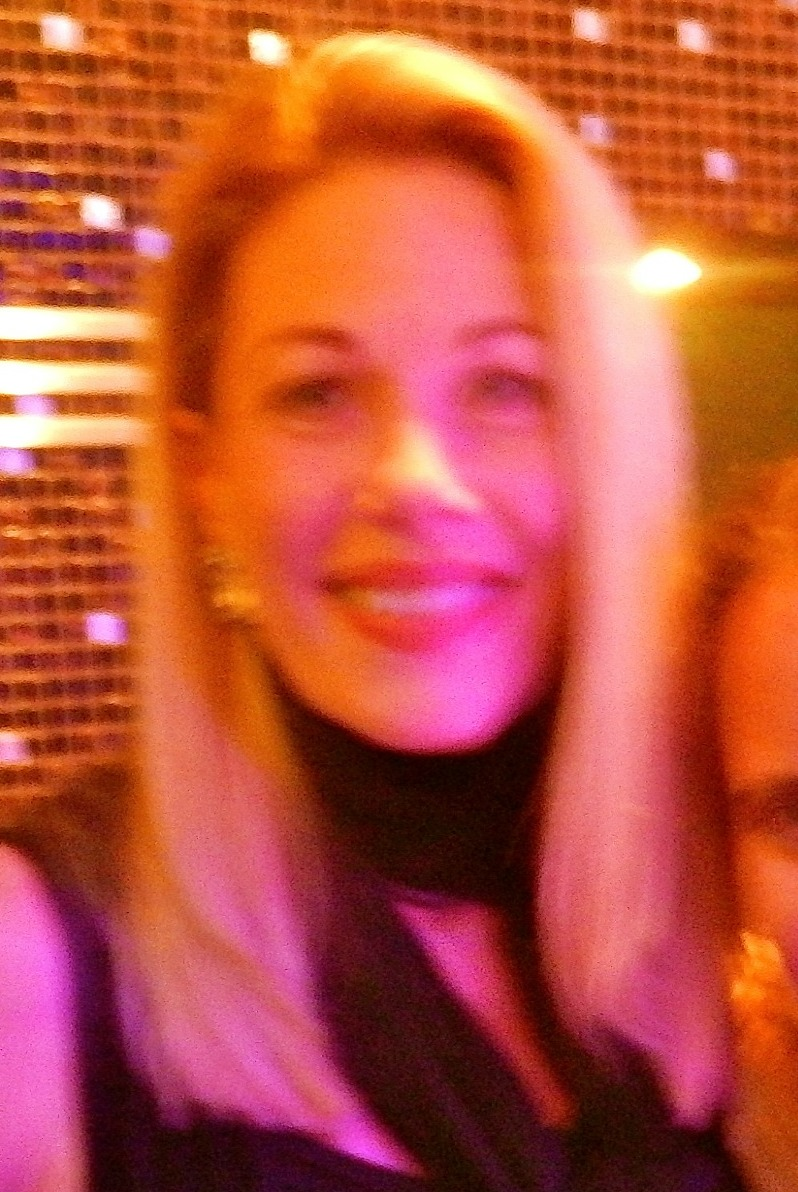
- Mazzie in 2013
- Born: Marin Joy Mazzie; October 9, 1960; Rockford, Illinois, U.S.
- Died: September 13, 2018 (aged 57); Manhattan, New York, U.S.
- Education: Western Michigan University
- Occupations: Actress, singer
- Years active: 1983–2018
- Notable work: Ragtime; Passion; Kiss Me, Kate
- Spouse: Jason Danieley (m. 1997)
- Honours: Special Tony Award (2019)

Marin Joy Mazzie (October 9, 1960 – September 13, 2018) was an American actress and singer known for her work in musical theatre.

Mazzie was a three-time Tony Award nominee, for her performances as Clara in Passion (1994), Mother in Ragtime (1998), and Lilli Vanessi/Katherine in Kiss Me, Kate (1999). For her work in Kiss Me, Kate, Mazzie was also nominated for a Drama Desk Award and Olivier Award, and she won an Outer Critics Circle Award.

In addition to appearing in many musical stage productions, Mazzie also performed in concert with her husband, Jason Danieley.

== Early life ==
Mazzie was born in Rockford, Illinois, and graduated from Western Michigan University, where she received degrees in theater and music. With an early interest in the theatre, Mazzie began to perform and sing in church choir at the age of 8 and to study voice at the age of 12. She continued to act in school and at college and in summer stock, where she was an apprentice at the Barn Theatre in Augusta, Michigan. While performing at the Barn, Mazzie befriended composer Jonathan Larson, who would go on to write Rent. She appears on many of Larson’s original demos of Superbia.

== Career ==
After graduating from college in 1982, Mazzie moved to New York City and made her New York stage debut in a 1983 Equity Library Theatre revival of the 1948 musical Where's Charley? as Kitty Verdun. She appeared in the 1991 off-Broadway Kander and Ebb revue And the World Goes 'Round and the subsequent 10-month national tour the following year. She went on to play starring roles in over a half dozen Broadway shows and also developed a cabaret act and made appearances in television.

In 1994 Mazzie created the role of Clara in the Stephen Sondheim musical Passion. This production was notable for its opening scene in which she was nude in bed with co-star Jere Shea. In 1998 Mazzie originated the role of Mother in the original production of Lynn Ahrens and Stephen Flaherty's musical Ragtime. She played the dual roles of Lilli Vanessi/Katharine in the 1999 revival of Kiss Me, Kate on Broadway and then transferred to the West End production in 2001. All three roles earned her Tony Award nominations.

About the 2006 Encores! presentation of Kismet at New York City Center, the Variety reviewer wrote: "Mazzie steals the comic thunder with a delicious turn as the glamorous Slut of the Casbah (Lalume), lewdly checking out the tasty man-slaves and happily playing along with Hajj's trickery, simply because he's hot. Looking dynamite in a flashy gold Donatella-goes-Mesopotamian number and a soufflé of blond curls, Mazzie's campy delivery of 'Not Since Nineveh' and the beyond-jaded 'Bored' succeeds in briefly raising the temperature of the otherwise tepid brew."

In May 2008 she appeared as Guenevere opposite Gabriel Byrne as King Arthur and Nathan Gunn as Lancelot in the New York Philharmonic staged concert presentation of Lerner and Loewe's Camelot, directed by Lonny Price. The May 8, 2008 performance of this production was broadcast nationally on Live from Lincoln Center on PBS.

Mazzie appeared in the drama ENRON, opening on Broadway in April 2010, as corporate vice president Claudia Roe. She replaced Alice Ripley as Diana in Next to Normal on July 19, 2010, opposite her real-life husband, Jason Danieley, as Dan. They stayed with the show until the Broadway production closed on January 16, 2011.

On November 20, 2009, Mazzie performed in a reading of a re-worked version of the 1988 Broadway flop Carrie as Margaret White. She stayed with the production which opened Off-Broadway on March 1, 2012, at the Lucille Lortel Theatre.

Mazzie appeared as Helen Sinclair in the Woody Allen/Susan Stroman musical Bullets Over Broadway: The Musical, which ran on Broadway from April to August 2014. She assumed the lead role of Anna Leonowens from Kelli O'Hara in the Lincoln Center revival of The King and I. Mazzie began performances on May 3, 2016, and stayed with the show until it closed on June 26, 2016.

== Honors ==
Mazzie was inducted into the American Theater Hall of Fame for 2017, in a ceremony at the Gershwin Theatre held in November 2017. In April 2019, it was announced that Mazzie would be the recipient of a posthumous Special Tony Award for her legacy as an advocate for women's health.

== Concerts, TV, and recordings ==
Mazzie also appeared on television. In the sitcom Still Standing, Mazzie and Kevin Nealon played an antagonistic neighbor couple in recurring roles.

She regularly performed in cabarets and concerts. She appeared in a Gala charity concert at Carnegie Hall in 1998, "My Favorite Broadway: The Leading Ladies", hosted by Julie Andrews. She and her husband, Jason Danieley, along with Faith Prince, performed a concert as a tribute to Jerry Herman in October–November 2003 in Utah with the Utah Symphony. This was similar to the Herman tribute Mazzie performed with the Boston Pops in May 2003.

Mazzie and her husband performed at the Bay Area Cabaret (San Francisco) season on October 23, 2005, performing their "Opposite You" program. In November 2005 they released an album, Opposite You (PS Classics label), consisting of songs sung in their cabaret program.

On March 15 and 16 2010, Mazzie performed at Sondheim! The Birthday Concert, honoring the musical theatre composer, Stephen Sondheim's, 80th birthday. Mazzie sang "We're Gonna Be Alright" from Do I Hear a Waltz? with her husband Jason Danieley, and "Losing My Mind" from Follies. The concert was broadcast on Great Performances by PBS on November 16 of the same year.

In 2015, Mazzie released her solo album, "Make Your Own Kind of Music," as part of the Live at 54 Below series. Mazzie and Jason Danieley recorded "Broadway and Beyond," which was released posthumously in 2019.

== Personal life ==
Mazzie was married to fellow Broadway actor Jason Danieley, whom she met in 1996 in a play they performed together, Trojan Women: A Love Story.

=== Death ===
Mazzie died on the morning of September 13, 2018, following a three-year battle with ovarian cancer. In honor of Mazzie's work, the lights of every Broadway theatre dimmed for one minute at 6:45 p.m. on September 19, 2018.

== Stage appearances (selected) ==
Note: Broadway unless noted

- Big River (1985): Mary Jane Wilkes (replacement)
- Merrily We Roll Along (1985 & 1990 regional revivals): Beth - La Jolla Playhouse and Arena Stage
- Into the Woods (1989): Rapunzel, (u/s Witch, Cinderella, Florinda, Lucinda) (replacement)
- Passion (1994 & 2004): Clara (original)
- Out of This World (Encores! staged concert) (1995): Helen
- Ragtime (1998): Mother (original)
- Kiss Me, Kate (Broadway & West End revival) (1999): Lilli Vanessi/Katharine
- Man of La Mancha (revival) (2002): Aldonza (Dulcinea) (replacement)
- 110 in the Shade (revival, Los Angeles) (2004): Lizzie Curry
- Brigadoon (revival, Los Angeles) (2004): Fiona MacLaren
- On the Twentieth Century (Broadway concert) (2005): Mildred Plotka/Lily Garland
- Spamalot (2006–2008): The Lady of the Lake (replacement)
- Camelot (New York Philharmonic staged concert) (2008): Guenevere
- ENRON (2010): Claudia Roe (original)
- Next to Normal (2010): Diana Goodman (replacement)
- Carrie (revival, off-Broadway) (2012): Margaret White
- Bullets Over Broadway (original) (2014): Helen Sinclair
- Zorba (Encores!) (2015): The Leader
- The King and I (revival) (2016): Anna Leonowens (replacement)
- Fire and Air (original, off-Broadway) (2018): Misia Sert

== Awards and nominations ==
Year	Award	Category	Nominated work	Result
1994	Tony Award	Best Performance by a Featured Actress in a Musical	Passion	Nominated
1994	Drama Desk Award	Outstanding Featured Actress in a Musical	Passion	Nominated
1998	Tony Award	Best Performance by a Leading Actress in a Musical	Ragtime	Nominated
1998	Drama Desk Award	Outstanding Actress in a Musical	Ragtime	Nominated
1998	Outer Critics Circle Award	Outstanding Actress in a Musical	Ragtime	Nominated
1998	Drama League Award	Distinguished Performance	Ragtime	Nominated
2000	Tony Award	Best Performance by a Leading Actress in a Musical	Kiss Me, Kate	Nominated
2000	Drama Desk Award	Outstanding Actress in a Musical	Kiss Me, Kate	Nominated
2000	Outer Critics Circle Award	Outstanding Actress in a Musical	Kiss Me, Kate	Won
2000	Drama League Award	Distinguished Performance	Kiss Me, Kate	Nominated
2002	Laurence Olivier Award	Best Actress in a Musical	Kiss Me, Kate	Nominated
2010	Drama League Award	Distinguished Performance	ENRON	Nominated
2012	Drama Desk Award	Outstanding Featured Actress in a Musical	Carrie	Nominated
2012	Drama League Award	Distinguished Performance	Carrie	Nominated
2012	Outer Critics Circle Award	Outstanding Actress in a Musical	Carrie	Nominated
2012	Lucille Lortel Award	Outstanding Featured Actress	Carrie	Nominated
2014	Outer Critics Circle Award	Outstanding Featured Actress in a Musical	Bullets Over Broadway	Won
