= All the Way Home (1963 film) =

1963 film by Alex Segal

- Theatrical poster
- Directed by: Alex Segal
- Screenplay by: Philip Reisman Jr.
- Based on: A Death in the Family (1957 novel) by James Agee All the Way Home (1960 play) by Tad Mosel
- Produced by: David Susskind
- Starring: Jean Simmons; Robert Preston; Pat Hingle; Aline MacMahon; Thomas Chalmers
- Cinematography: Boris Kaufman
- Edited by: Lora Hays
- Music by: Bernard Green
- Production company: Talent Associates
- Distributed by: Paramount Pictures
- Release dates: September 14, 1963 (New York Film Festival); October 17, 1963 (Knoxville)
- Running time: 97–107 minutes
- Country: United States
- Language: English
- Budget: $650,000 or $1 million

All the Way Home is a 1963 drama film directed by Alex Segal and written by Philip Reisman Jr., who adapted his screenplay from the 1960 play of the same name by Tad Mosel, which was based on James Agee's 1957 autobiographical novel A Death in the Family.

Set in a small town in Agee's home state of Tennessee in 1915, the film follows a young boy and his mother who must deal with the sudden death of the family patriarch. It stars Jean Simmons, Robert Preston, Pat Hingle, Aline MacMahon, and Thomas Hardie Chalmers.

== Plot ==
In Tennessee in 1915, seven-year-old Rufus lives with his parents, Jay and Mary. Jay is an affectionate, easygoing father, while Mary is more reserved and religious. Their marriage is loving despite disagreements about Jay's drinking and how to discuss Mary's pregnancy with Rufus. Father and son enjoy spending time together, including a visit to a Charlie Chaplin film.

Jay's brother Ralph tells him that their father is seriously ill. Jay goes to visit him but dies in a car accident on the return journey. Mary struggles with her loss, while Rufus tries to understand what has happened. After the funeral, the boy runs to the place where he and Jay used to watch trains. Mary finds him there and comforts him, explaining that the baby she is expecting will remind him of his father. They return home together.

== Production ==
David Susskind acquired the screen rights to Tad Mosel's play in 1961. Paramount Pictures provided financing and distribution. Aline MacMahon and Lylah Tiffany reprised their stage roles. Principal photography began in Knoxville, Tennessee, on October 8, 1962.

Michael Kearney was cast as Rufus after auditioning in New York. Still learning to read, he learned his lines through repetition and worked with a tutor during filming.

Art director Richard Sylbert furnished the interior sets at Gold Medal Studios in New York with items acquired from James Agee's demolished childhood home. A nearby house served as a substitute for location filming.

== Cast ==
- Jean Simmons as Mary Follett
- Robert Preston as Jay Follett
- Pat Hingle as Ralph Follett
- Aline MacMahon as Aunt Hannah
- Thomas Chalmers as Joel
- John Cullum as Andrew
- Helen Carew as Mary's mother
- Ronnie Claire Edwards as Sally
- John Henry Faulk as Walter Starr
- Mary Perry as Great-aunt Sadie
- Lylah Tiffany as Great-great-grandmaw
- Edwin Wolfe as John Henry
- Michael Kearney as Rufus Follett
- David Huddleston (uncredited)

== Release ==
The film was screened at the first New York Film Festival at Philharmonic Hall on September 14, 1963. Its official premiere was held at the Tennessee Theatre on October 17, 1963.

For the Knoxville premiere, the city temporarily renamed Gay Street "Agee Street" and installed signs bearing the film's title along the route to the Tennessee Theatre. Robert Preston, Michael Kearney and David Susskind attended the event, arriving from the Andrew Johnson Hotel in a procession of vintage automobiles.

== Reception ==
In its contemporary review, Time criticized the adaptation for replacing the novel's subtlety with sentimentality and found Alex Segal's direction prosaic, while praising Jean Simmons's handling of several emotional scenes. In a retrospective review for Common Sense Media, Nell Minow praised the film's emotional insight and its portrayal of the relationship between Jay and Rufus.

The National Board of Review included All the Way Home among its ten best films of 1963.

== See also ==
- List of American films of 1963
