= Frank Galati =

American director, writer and actor (1943–2023)

- Born: November 29, 1943; Highland Park, Illinois, U.S.
- Died: January 2, 2023 (aged 79); Sarasota, Florida, U.S.
- Education: Northwestern University (BS, MS, PhD)
- Occupations: Theatre director, actor, professor
- Spouse: Peter Amster (m. 2017)
- Awards: Tony Award for Best Play; 1990 The Grapes of Wrath; Tony Award for Best Direction of a Play; 1990 The Grapes of Wrath; Outstanding Director of a Play; 1990 The Grapes of Wrath

Frank Joseph Galati (November 29, 1943 – January 2, 2023) was an American director, writer, and actor. He was a member of Steppenwolf Theatre Company and an associate director at Goodman Theatre. He taught at Northwestern University for many years.

== Early life ==
Galati was born in Highland Park, Illinois, a suburb of Chicago, the son of Virginia (Cassel), a saleswoman with Marshall Field, and Frank Galati, a dog trainer and boarder. He attended Glenbrook North High School in Northbrook, Illinois, where he competed in speech, winning a state championship in the Original Comedy event in 1961. He attended Western Illinois University for one year before transferring to Northwestern University, where he received a B.S. in speech, with a concentration in interpretation, in 1965. He taught at the University of South Florida and then earned a M.S. in speech from Northwestern in 1966, and received his Ph.D. in interpretation from Northwestern in 1971. During this time, he both directed and performed in numerous plays.

== Career ==
Galati was an associate director at the Goodman Theatre from 1986 to 2008.

In 2004, Galati was inducted into the Chicago Gay and Lesbian Hall of Fame. He was the recipient of nine Joseph Jefferson Awards for his contributions to Chicago theater.

Galati and co-writer Lawrence Kasdan adapted the novel The Accidental Tourist for a film, The Accidental Tourist which was nominated for an Academy Award for Best Writing (Adapted Screenplay), a BAFTA Award for Best Adapted Screenplay, and a Writers Guild of America Award for Best Adapted Screenplay. The pair won a USC Scripter Award for the screenplay.

Galati was awarded the Tony Award for Best Play for his adaptation of The Grapes of Wrath in 1990. The production originated at Steppenwolf and transferred to Broadway where, in addition to Best Play, Galati won an additional Tony for Best Direction of a Play. The drama also received six more nominations, including recognition in acting categories for Gary Sinise, Terry Kinney, and Lois Smith. Following his success with The Grapes of Wrath, Galati went on to adapt As I Lay Dying in 1995, and Haruki Murakami's After the Quake in 2005. He also wrote original work, such as Everyman (1995). Most of his work debuted at Steppenwolf.

Galati occasionally had turns as an actor, and directed Tony Kushner's Homebody/Kabul at New York Theatre Workshop. For Broadway, he directed the musical Ragtime in 1998 and The Pirate Queen in 2007. He directed two productions of The Visit, at the Goodman Theatre in 2001 and at the Signature Theatre (Arlington, Virginia) in May 2008, with Chita Rivera.

With a book score by Stephen Flaherty, lyrics by Lynn Ahrens, and directing and libretto by Galati, Knoxville premiered at the Asolo Repertory Theatre in spring 2020, based on the Pulitzer Prize winning book A Death in the Family by James Agee and Pulitzer Prize winning play All the Way Home by Tad Mosel. It stars Jason Danieley as Author.

The Frank Galati Papers are at Northwestern University. He was a professor emeritus in the Department of Performance Studies at Northwestern University, having retired in 2006.

== Personal life and death ==
Galati married his longtime partner, Peter Amster, in 2017. Later in life, they resided between Sarasota, Florida, and Beaver Island on Lake Michigan. Galati died in Sarasota from cancer on January 2, 2023, at the age of 79.

== See also ==
- Steppenwolf Theatre Company
- Chamber theater
