= Knoxville (musical) =

Musical based on the 1957 novel A Death in the Family

- Music: Stephen Flaherty
- Lyrics: Lynn Ahrens
- Book: Frank Galati
- Basis: A Death in the Family by James Agee
- Productions: 2022 Asolo Repertory Theatre; 2024 Clarence Brown Theatre UT

Knoxville is a stage musical with a book by Frank Galati, music by Stephen Flaherty and lyrics by Lynn Ahrens. The musical is based on the novel A Death in the Family written by James Agee, which won the Pulitzer Prize for Fiction upon its release in 1957.

The title comes from the setting of the story in Knoxville, Tennessee, where original author Agee was from. The show is set in 1915.

== Production history ==
The show was announced on February 6, 2019, with a concert reading held in New York City featuring Claybourne Elder. The musical was originally scheduled to premiere in the spring of 2020 at Asolo Repertory Theatre in Sarasota, Florida, however these plans were cancelled due to the COVID-19 pandemic. The project was conceived by Galati who enlisted the music team of Ahrens and Flaherty to help construct the show. Rescheduling the show took nearly two years until 2022 when it was announced to be part of Asolo's 2022–2023 season. The world premiere was held from April 23 through May 11, 2022. The show was choreographed by Josh Rhodes.

An Original Cast Album was recorded and released on October 21, 2022.

Galati died on January 2, 2023, months after the world premiere of the project.

The University of Tennessee in Knoxville premiered the first university production of the show in September 2024 at the Clarence Brown Theatre.

The musical, now under the title All the Way Home, will premiere in New York in April 2027 as part of The York Theatre's NEW2NY Series, which presents limited runs of new musicals in development.

== Original cast and characters ==
Character	Asolo Rep (2022)	Clarence Brown Theatre (2024)
James Agee	Jason Danieley	Jason Danieley
Jay Follett	Paul Alexander Nolan	Alan Chandler
Mary Follett	Hannah Elless	Hannah Elless
Ralph Follett	Joel Waggoner	Chris Hoch
Hannah Lynch	Ellen Harvey	Shinnerrie Jackson
Sally Follett	Sarah Aili	Lili Thomas
Catherine Lynch	Barbara Marineau	Katy Wolfe
Joel Lynch	William Parry	Brian O’Neill
Rufus Follett	Jack Casey	Nick Barrington
Andrew Lynch	Nathan Salstone	Clay Cooper
Jessie Follet	Natalie Venetia Belcon	Laura Beth Wells
Victoria	Abigail Stephenson	McKinley Merritt
Man at the Scene/Father Jackson	Scott Wakefield	Sammy Pontello
The Ferryman/Doctor Dekalb	Dwelvan David	Dwelvan David

== Musical numbers ==
- "Knoxville" - Company
- "Father to Son" - Jay
- "Ralph's Here" - Mary, Jay, Ralph, Sally
- "Outside Your Window" - Company
- "Outside Your Window (reprise)" - Mary, Jay
- "Ordinary Goodbye" - Mary
- "Life is in a Store" - Author, Hannah, Rufus
- "The Ferryman" - The Ferryman
- "Waking in Darkness" - Company
- "Whatever It Is" - Hannah, Rufus
- "A Cotter Pin" - Company
- "Waking in Darkness (reprise)" - Joel
- "That's What I Believe / Outside Your Window (reprise)" - Author, Jay
- "Simple Biology" - Victoria, Rufus
- "Black Dress" - Sally, Catherine, Jessie
- "All the Way Home" - Victoria, Company (added in 2024 run)
- "The Dressmaker and the Milliner" - Catherine
- "Stillness" - Author, Rufus, Company
- "In His Strength" - Mary, Jay, Hannah, Rufus
- "The Butterfly" - Andrew (Author and Rufus in 2024 run)
- "Knoxville (reprise)" - Company

A cast album was released following the world premiere with the original cast and is available from Broadway Records.
