= The Glorious Ones =

Musical

- Original Off-Broadway poster
- Music: Stephen Flaherty
- Lyrics: Lynn Ahrens
- Book: Lynn Ahrens
- Basis: Novel by Francine Prose
- Productions: 2007 Pittsburgh; 2007 Off-Broadway

The Glorious Ones is a musical with book and lyrics by Lynn Ahrens and music by Stephen Flaherty. Set in 17th-century Italy, it concerns a theatre group in the world of commedia dell'arte and theatre of the Italian Renaissance.

After premiering in Pittsburgh in April 2007, the musical opened Off-Broadway in October 2007.

== Production history ==
The musical premiered April 27, 2007, at the Pittsburgh Public Theater and closed on May 20, 2007.

It then opened Off-Broadway at the Mitzi E. Newhouse Theater, as a production of the Lincoln Center Theater on October 11, 2007 and ran through January 6, 2008. Directed and choreographed by Graciela Daniele, the New York cast featured Marc Kudisch, Erin Davie, Natalie Venetia Belcon, and David Patrick Kelly.

The musical was presented at the Landor Theatre, London, from 6 March to 7 April 2012, with direction by Robert McWhir.

The Canadian premiere of The Glorious Ones took place in May 2014, presented by the Toronto Civic Light Opera Company, starring Joe Cascone (Flaminio), Joanne Kennedy (Columbina), David Haines (Dottore), Eric Botosan (Pantalone), Elizabeth Rose Morriss (Isabella) and Jordan Quinn (Francesco).

== Plot ==
As the curtains part, seven actors appear in commedia dell'arte costumes, on a little stage, moving in a dreamlike recreation of their old roles. Flaminio Scala, the leader of the troupe, begins the story, transporting us back to a beautiful spring day in Venice.

Suddenly, we are on a piazza, as the Glorious Ones, set up a stage and introduce us to their bawdy style of comedy. ("The Glorious Ones"). They tell us that much of their comic routines were improvised, and Flaminio Scala illustrates with a slapstick version of his early life, in which he demonstrates how he was raised by monks and later thrown onto the street. There, the endless parade of humanity inspires him to create a new kind of theater—masked the Commedia dell'arte.

We meet Armanda Ragusa, a dwarf, who is madly in love with the dashing Flaminio. She steals little mementos of her idol—his lost buttons, one of his old stockings, posters, etc.--and keeps them in a sack under her bed. She and Flaminio rehearse a comic sketch about a little dog. They are interrupted by the leading lady, Columbina, who is Flaminio's mistress. She is sick of waiting for him and sick of his antics. ("Making Love.") By the time the number is over, he has seduced her once again.

We next meet Pantalone, who was once a tailor but now plays the roles of the old misers in the troupe's plays. ("Pantalone Alone.") He and Armanda commiserate about their lovelorn states ("The Comedy of Love"). Dottore Graziano, the "quack doctor" in their skits, has sold Pantalone a love elixir, but it hasn't worked—Columbina still doesn't love him.

Their backstage dilemmas are mirrored onstage in a comic show-within-the show, "The Comedy of Love," in which Flaminio Scala always ends up with the female "love interest," after almost committing comic suicide with a rubber sword.

The next day, Flaminio Scala discovers Francesco Andreini, a talented young comic, who is performing on the street. Flaminio takes him under his wing, ("The Glorious Ones - Reprise") and before long they are like father and son. Flaminio teaches Francesco what it means to be an actor ("Madness to Act") but Francesco lets us know that he's more ambitious than he may appear. ("Absalom.") During the course of this song, Flaminio gets an idea from the many patches on Francesco's clothes—he creates a patchwork costume for a new character--Arlecchino, the clown—and gives his young protege this featured role.

The quack Dottore tries frantically to get onto the stage but is prevented by an invisible wall. In mime, he manages to find a way to get through, and then happily insults the audience in Latin. At last he introduces the next adventure for The Glorious Ones--"The Invitation to France," and they embark on a whirlwind trip, filled with travails, to perform for the French Court ("Flaminio Scala's Historical Journey to France"). Flaminio is convinced that their lowbrow humor will enchant the King, make their fortunes, and cement his reputation as a theatrical genius for all time.

Once in France, their performance for the King begins with three vulgar "lazzi" or comic routines, which lead up to the most bawdy piece of all, "Armanda's Tarantella," featuring the little dwarf, all the men, and a series of double-entendres!. But instead of glory and fame, the response of the religious court is to throw them out of France. Flaminio is angry and humiliated before his troupe, but rallies them to his side once again with his artistic vision. ("Improvisation.") The only one not convinced is Francesco.

Lights come up on a beautiful young noblewoman named Isabella. We learn that she writes stories against her parents' wishes. ("The World She Writes.") Francesco notices her and gets her to come down from her balcony. She shows him a play she has written, "The Moon Woman," and soon they have discovered they are kindred spirits, born to play "Opposite You." They elope, and Isabella joins the troupe. All the men are enamored of her. Armanda is jealous, but Columbina understands how men are. In "My Body Wasn't Why," she sings about her passionate love affair with Flaminio, which led her to be his leading lady. But during the course of the song, Flaminio tells her she is now too old to play that role, that he is giving it to the fresh-faced Isabella. Columbina must settle for the role of the comic maid.

The Glorious Ones perform the second play-within-a play. It is still "The Comedy of Love," Flaminio is still the leading man who nearly kills himself, but now Isabella is the leading lady. During the performance, Isabella and her husband Francesco play a trick on Flaminio, and suddenly the clownish Arlechino becomes the leading man.

After the show, Flaminio is furious at the trick, but Columbina tells him to deal with the fact that he's too old to play the role of the lover. She had to. Flaminio has "Flaminio Scala's Ominous Dream" in which he fantasizes that Isabella and Francesco are leading him astray and trying to destroy him.

The actors tease each other backstage. Francesco presents Isabella's play to them, and suggests they try it, implying that their roles will be fuller than the stereotypes they play every night. Flaminio is drunk and enraged by this challenge to his authority. But the troupe votes to try the new play. In his drunken state Flaminio sees the troupe mocking him and deriding his "Rise and Fall." But in the end, he goes along with it, agreeing to play the grotesque, comic character of Captain Spavento.

Before the performance of "The Moon Woman," Columbina and Flaminio prepare to go onstage. Flaminio is depressed, but Columbina suggests maybe they should finally retire and settle down together. "There's more to life than theater," she tells him, and he seems to agree.

The Glorious Ones present "The Moon Woman," now dressed in more elegant masks and costumes. The play is stilted and poetic, nothing like their old, freewheeling slapstick. Flaminio tries to play his part, but can't. He throws off his mask and begins to improvise. The cast can't help themselves—they join him. At last, he pretends to kill himself for love as he always did, staggers around and falls. Columbina falls to her knees, praying comically for him, but suddenly realizes that the blood is real and that Flaminio is indeed dead.

As the actors grieve, mystified by his terrible act, Flaminio rises and looks back on his life, and the beauty of doing something of worth. ("I Was Here"). Armanda arrives at the monastery where Flaminio was raised, bringing with her "Armanda's Sack." One by one, all the Glorious Ones light up, remembering their glory days in the theater with Flaminio Scala.

At last, they arrive in Heaven, where Flaminio awaits them, and we are back to our opening image—stars, clouds, a little stage. They look down through a window in the sky, and see Armanda's sack being disposed of. But they are not forgotten. Instead, a "film projector" begins to flicker, and they see a parade of comic icons—Lucille Ball, Buster Keaton, Charlie Chaplin, etc.—they realize their comedy has survived the centuries and exists today. The curtain closes as the Glorious Ones explode into joyous peals of laughter.

== Songs ==
- The Glorious Ones / Flaminio Scala, The Glorious Ones
- Making Love /Columbina, Flaminio and Troupe
- Pantalone Alone / Pantalone
- The Comedy of Love/Pantalone, Armanda Ragusa, and Troupe

Scenario – The Madness of Columbina /The Glorious Ones

- The Comedy of Love (reprise) /Pantalone, Armanda Ragusa
- The Glorious Ones (reprise) /Flaminio
- Madness to Act /Flaminio
- Absalom/ Francesco
- The Invitation to France / Dottore
- Flaminio Scala's Historical Journey to France/ The Glorious Ones
- Two Lazzi /The Glorious Ones
- Armanda's Tarantella /Armanda, Men
- Improvisation / Flaminio
- The World She Writes/ IsabeIla
- Opposite You /Franccsco, Isabella
- My Body Wasn't Why/ Columbina

Scenario – The Madness of Isabella /The Glorious Ones

- Flaminio Scala's Ominous Dream /Flaminio and Troupe
- The World She Writes (reprise) / Francesco
- Rise and Fall /Dottore and Troupe
- The Moon Woman, A Play The Glorious Ones
- The Glorious Ones (reprise) Flaminio
- I Was Here / Flaminio
- Armanda's Sack /Armanda and Troupe
- Finale/ The Glorious Ones

== Characters and Off-Broadway cast ==
- Columbina – Natalie Venetia Belcon
- Isabella Andreini/Young Boy Actor – Erin Davie
- Dottore – John Kassir
- Pantalone – David Patrick Kelly
- Flaminio Scala – Marc Kudisch
- Armanda Ragusa – Julyana Soelistyo
- Francesco Andreini/Comic Servant – Jeremy Webb

== Critical response ==
Charles Isherwood, in his review in The New York Times of the Off-Broadway production, wrote: "With buoyant music by Stephen Flaherty and a bawdy book and lyrics by Lynn Ahrens, the show mixes the lowdown pratfalls of commedia dell’arte with the rosy sentimentality of classic American musical comedy...The resulting musical is a sweet but strange hybrid, both joyfully naughty and totally innocuous."

== Awards and nominations ==
Drama Desk Awards

- Outstanding Musical (nomination)
- Outstanding Music (nomination)
- Outstanding Lyrics (nomination)
- Outstanding Orchestrations (Michael Starobin) (nomination)
- Outstanding Costume Design (Mara Blumenfeld) (nomination)

Outer Critics Circle Award

- Outstanding New Off-Broadway New Musical (nomination)
- Outstanding Choreographer (nomination)
