= Nichelle Lewis =

American actress and singer

- Born: Nichelle Lewis; June 17, 1999 (age 26); Midlothian, Virginia, U.S.
- Education: Molloy University (BFA)
- Occupations: Actress and singer
- Years active: 2010s–present

Nichelle Lewis (born June 17, 1999) is an American actress and singer. She is best known for her breakthrough lead role as Dorothy in the Broadway revival of The Wiz as well as her Tony Award-nominated performance as Sarah in the 2025 revival of Ragtime.

== Early life ==
Nichelle Lewis was born in Midlothian, Virginia, U.S. As a child, she participated in her high school show choir, Capital Swing & Touch Of Swing, and visited New York City often. After graduating from Manchester High School in 2017, she attended Molloy University, where she earned her Bachelor of Fine Arts in Musical Theatre, graduating in 2021.

== Career ==
Lewis began her professional theatre career in regional and touring productions. She has appeared in the national tour of Hairspray (as Dynamite/Cindy Watkins), Little Shop of Horrors (as Chiffon/Crystal), Bare: A Pop Opera (as Ivy), and a new musical titled Labelless.

In 2023, Lewis was announced as the lead in the Broadway revival of The Wiz, marking her Broadway debut. Her performance received media attention for its energy, vocal power, and emotional warmth, earning her recognition as one of Broadway's most promising new talents. In October 2024, she was cast as Sarah in the New York City Center revival of Ragtime. The production transferred to Broadway in 2025, and Lewis was nominated for a Tony Award.

== Artistic style and impact ==
Lewis has been described by The Washington Informer and Associated Press as a "triple threat" for her combined strengths in acting, singing, and dancing. Her rise from a high-school show choir performer in Virginia to a Broadway lead has been highlighted by local Richmond media as an inspirational example for young artists pursuing careers in the performing arts.

== Stage credits ==
Year	Title	Role	Venue	Ref.
2022	Hairspray	Dynamite/Cindy Watkins	U.S. National Tour	
2023	The Wiz	Dorothy	U.S. National Tour	
2024	The Wiz	Dorothy	Broadway, Marquis Theatre	
2024	Ragtime	Sarah	Off-Broadway, New York City Center Encores!	
2025–2026	Ragtime	Sarah	Broadway, Vivian Beaumont Theatre	

== Awards and nominations ==
Year	Award	Category	Work	Result	Ref.
2024	Drama League Award	Distinguished Performance	The Wiz	Nominated	
2024	Theatre World Award	Outstanding Debut	The Wiz	Won	
2024	Grammy Award	Best Musical Theater Album	The Wiz	Nominated	
2024	Helen Hayes Award	Outstanding Performer, Non-Resident Production	The Wiz	Nominated	
2026	Tony Award	Best Featured Actress in a Musical	Ragtime	Nominated	
