= A Death in the Family =

1957 novel by James Agee

- First edition cover
- Author: James Agee
- Language: English
- Genre: Autobiographical fiction
- Publisher: McDowell, Obolensky
- Publication date: November 1957
- Publication place: United States
- Media type: Print (hardcover)
- Pages: 339 pp
- OCLC: 123180486

A Death in the Family is an autobiographical novel by James Agee. It was based on events from 1915, when Agee's father drove out of town to visit his own father who had suffered a heart attack. During the return trip, Agee's father was killed in a car accident. The novel focuses on the immediate aftermath of the accident, and how the family members cope with the tragedy.

Although Agee had been working on the novel for many years, it was not complete when he died unexpectedly in May 1955. David McDowell of the McDowell, Obolensky publishing firm made various editorial decisions as to how to organize the manuscript into a finished form. The resulting novel was released in November 1957, winning Agee a posthumous Pulitzer Prize for Fiction. Decades later, Professor Michael Lofaro of the University of Tennessee challenged the editorial choices that McDowell had made, and published an alternative version of A Death in the Family in 2007.

== Synopsis ==
The novel provides a portrait of the Follet family in Knoxville, Tennessee in the mid-1910s. It shows how the sudden death of Jay Follet affects his devout wife Mary, their two young children Catherine and Rufus (the author's alter ego), Jay's alcoholic brother Ralph, Mary's agnostic father Joel, her brother Andrew, and her Aunt Hannah.

The story is told in three parts: the day before the accident when six-year-old Rufus and his father spend enjoyable time together; the dark hours when Mary and other family members learn of Jay's fatal car crash; and the ensuing days leading up to the funeral. Surrounding these three parts are italicized "interludes" that recall earlier events. The novel opens with an italicized prologue, "Knoxville: Summer 1915", an autobiographical prose-poem which Agee first published in 1938 in Partisan Review.

== Background ==
According to Dwight Macdonald, Agee resigned in 1948 as movie reviewer for The Nation and Time magazines "specifically to finish A Death in the Family"; however, at the time of his death on May 16, 1955, the novel was still not complete. Reputedly, he had been writing portions of it at the home of his friend Frances Wickes. Agee spoke of his plans for the novel on multiple occasions with longtime friend David McDowell of the newly formed McDowell, Obolensky publishing company. The last such conversation occurred at a Greenwich Village party on the night of May 13, 1955. The manuscript already had the title, A Death in the Family.

With the consent of Agee's widow, McDowell prepared the manuscript for publication, an editorial process he describes in "A Note on This Book", which is printed in the front matter of the novel:

There has been no re-writing, and nothing has been eliminated except for a few cases of first-draft material which he [Agee] later re-worked at greater length, and one section of seven-odd pages which the editors were unable satisfactorily to fit into the body of the novel. The ending of A Death in the Family had been reached sometime before Agee's death, and the only editorial problem involved the placing of several scenes outside the time span of the basic story. It was finally decided to print these in italics and to put them after Parts I and II. It seemed presumptuous to try to guess where he might have inserted them.... The short section Knoxville: Summer of 1915, which serves as a sort of prologue, has been added. It was not a part of the manuscript which Agee left, but the editors would certainly have urged him to include it in the final draft.

== Critical reception and awards ==
In the Chicago Tribune, Richard Sullivan praised A Death in the Family as "an uncommonly fine novel" that deals with the universal fact of death and its effect on the persons bereaved. He added that "the novel resolves nothing, solves no problems. But it does pose, with precision of phrase and in particular terms, a universal human situation most affectingly, for our observation and contemplation. To do this is noble achievement."

In The New Republic, Leslie Fiedler said A Death in the Family "is not a completed novel, but a collection of brilliant narrative and lyric fragments given editorially the semblance of a novel. In its present state (fixed by the premature death of the author), it hesitates between two ambitions, one of which would have made it a tight, highly unified novella, covering only some three or four days; the other of which would have expanded it in the direction of a thick, family saga, spanning in its main action five to ten years".

Agee biographer Victor Kramer later wrote that "the word 'poetic' often occurs in descriptions of the novel, and many perceptive insights about its form derive from the realization that A Death in the Family is more like a poem than a novel."

A Death in the Family won Agee a posthumous Pulitzer Prize for Fiction in 1958. Time magazine added it to a list of the 100 best English-language novels released between 1923 and 2005.

== Later version ==
In the early 2000s, University of Tennessee professor Michael Lofaro asserted that the novel published in 1957 was not the version intended for print by the author. Lofaro discussed his research during a conference at the Knoxville James Agee Celebration in April 2005. He itemized McDowell's alterations:

- The removal of the original opening, a nightmare scene, and its substitution with "Knoxville: Summer 1915", a previously published work of Agee's that was not meant to be part of the novel.
- A reordering of the presentation of events, which were originally shown in chronological order.
- Chapters were removed.
- Chapters were divided.
- Certain chapters were moved and presented as flashbacks.
- The number of chapters was changed from forty-four short chapters to twenty longer ones.

After Agee's manuscripts, drafts and handwritten notes were donated by the author's family to the University of Tennessee, Lofaro reconstructed a version that he considered more authentic. His alternative version, titled A Death in the Family: A Restoration of the Author's Text, was published in 2007 as part of the 10-volume set The Collected Works of James Agee, issued by University of Tennessee Press.

== Adaptations ==
The novel has been adapted for stage and screen numerous times. The most successful effort was in 1960 by Tad Mosel. His play All the Way Home, directed by Arthur Penn, ran on Broadway for nearly a year; it won the 1961 Pulitzer Prize for Drama and the New York Drama Critics' Circle Award.

A film entitled All The Way Home (1963), adapted by Philip H. Reisman, Jr. from the Agee novel and the Mosel play, was filmed in the same Knoxville neighborhood where Agee grew up. A TV movie version of All the Way Home, starring Joanne Woodward and Richard Kiley, aired in 1971 as a Hallmark Hall of Fame presentation. Mosel's play was broadcast live on NBC in 1981 from the Bing Theatre on the University of Southern California campus. The cast included Sally Field and William Hurt.

A TV movie adaptation of A Death in the Family, filmed in Tennessee and starring Annabeth Gish and John Slattery, aired on PBS in March 2002.

In 1947, Samuel Barber wrote a musical piece, "Knoxville: Summer of 1915". It was inspired by Agee's prose-poem by that name, which previously appeared in Partisan Review and would become the prologue to A Death in the Family. "Knoxville: Summer of 1915" was first performed by American soprano Eleanor Steber in April 1948.

William Mayer wrote an opera based on the novel, which premiered in 1983.

A musical stage production titled Knoxville was written by Frank Galati, with music by Stephen Flaherty and lyrics by Lynn Ahrens. The musical, based on Agee's novel and Mosel's All the Way Home, was advertised as "a universal coming-of-age story about family, faith and love—and the boy who will grow up to write it. With a sweeping musical score blending folk, bluegrass and ballads." In 2020, Knoxville was in rehearsals for its world premiere at the Asolo Repertory Theatre when it was forced to cancel due to the COVID-19 pandemic. The show eventually premiered in April 2022.
