= Chamber theatre =

Method of adapting literary works to the stage

Chamber theater is a method of adapting literary works to the stage using a maximal amount of the work's original text and often minimal and suggestive settings.

In chamber theater, narration is included in the performed text and the narrator might be played by multiple actors. Professor Robert S. Breen (1909-1991) introduced "Chamber Theater" to his Oral Interpretation Classes at Northwestern University in 1947.

Northwestern's Professor of Performance Studies Frank Galati, who studied chamber theater with Dr. Breen, has directed highly acclaimed chamber theater productions for the Goodman Theater and Steppenwolf Theater companies in Chicago. Galati's chamber theater adaptation of John Steinbeck’s The Grapes of Wrath won two Tony Awards on Broadway.

One of the most renowned, elaborate examples of chamber theater is David Edgar's The Life and Adventures of Nicholas Nickleby, in which Charles Dickens' characters narrate themselves in third person. Set pieces are carried in and taken away during the performance, rather than between scenes, and objects may be represented in a mimetic manner.

== See also ==
- Chamber play
