= Ragtime (musical) =

Musical by Lynn Ahrens and Stephen Flaherty

- Cover of cast recording
- Music: Stephen Flaherty
- Lyrics: Lynn Ahrens
- Book: Terrence McNally
- Basis: Ragtime by E. L. Doctorow
- Productions: 1996 Toronto; 1997 Los Angeles; 1998 Broadway; 1998 US tour 2003 West End; 2009 Broadway revival 2025 Broadway revival
- Awards: Tony Award for Best Book of a Musical; Tony Award for Best Original Score; 2026 Tony Award for Best Revival of a Musical

Ragtime is a musical with music by Stephen Flaherty, lyrics by Lynn Ahrens, and a book by Terrence McNally. It is based on the 1975 novel by E. L. Doctorow.

Set in the early 20th century, Ragtime tells the story of three groups in the United States: African Americans, represented by Coalhouse Walker Jr., a Harlem musician; upper-class suburbanites, represented by Mother, the matriarch of a white upper-class family in New Rochelle, New York; and Eastern European immigrants, represented by Tateh, a Jewish immigrant from Latvia. The show also incorporates historical figures such as Harry Houdini, Evelyn Nesbit, Booker T. Washington, J. P. Morgan, Henry Ford, Stanford White, Harry Kendall Thaw, Admiral Peary, Matthew Henson, and Emma Goldman.

== Background ==
Doctorow's 1975 novel was well received, winning the first National Book Critics Circle Award for Fiction among other accolades. The book used both fictional and historical characters in a story that treats the serious themes of class and race in America at the beginning of the 20th century. It follows a working class black family, a wealthy white family and an immigrant Jewish family. The character of Coalhouse Walker is based, in turn, on Michael Kohlhaas, a novella by Heinrich von Kleist about a 16th-century working class German, who is persecuted by a wealthy and powerful man, and his unsuccessful efforts to gain justice. Doctorow's tale was adapted as a 1981 film directed by Miloš Forman.

Livent, then led by Garth Drabinsky, acquired the rights to adapt the novel for the stage by 1994; it produced Kiss of The Spider Woman, which premiered in Toronto, Canada, in 1992 before moving to Broadway, and a lavish revival of Show Boat on Broadway in 1994. Livent spared no expense in developing the Broadway-bound Ragtime. It built the Lyric Theatre (originally called the Ford Center for the Performing Arts), to house the musical. Early on, McNally was hired to write the book, but to choose a songwriter or songwriting team, Livent auditioned numerous applicants who were each asked to write four songs within eleven days. These included Jason Robert Brown, Kander and Ebb (who wrote Kiss of the Spiderwoman for Livent), Michael John LaChiusa and Adam Guettel. Livent and McNally selected Ahrens and Flaherty.

== Production history ==
=== Toronto and Los Angeles ===
The musical premiered in Toronto, opening at the Ford Centre for the Performing Arts (now the Meridian Arts Centre) on December 8, 1996, produced by Livent, and ran for 9 months. A concept album, Songs from Ragtime: The Musical, featuring much of the Toronto cast, was released on February 11, 1996. In 1998, it was nominated for the Grammy Award for Best Musical Theater Album.

The first US staging was at the Shubert Theatre, Los Angeles, California, in June 1997, starring Marcia Mitzman Gaven, John Dossett, Judy Kaye, Brian Stokes Mitchell, LaChanze, and John Rubinstein. Many of these were later in the Broadway cast.

=== Broadway ===
The original Broadway production began previews on December 26, 1997, and officially opened on January 18, 1998. It was the first production in the newly opened Ford Center for the Performing Arts. It was directed by Frank Galati and choreographed by Graciela Daniele. It featured many of the actors from the Toronto cast, including Mitchell as Coalhouse, Marin Mazzie as Mother, Peter Friedman as Tateh and Audra McDonald as Sarah, all of whom were nominated for Tony Awards, as well as Steven Sutcliffe as Mother's Younger Brother, Judy Kaye as Emma Goldman, Mark Jacoby as Father and Lea Michele as Tateh's daughter. The production was conducted by David Loud. It closed on January 16, 2000, after 834 performances and 27 previews.

Ragtime received mixed reviews, with critics opining that the dazzling physical production (with a $10 million budget, including fireworks and a working Model T automobile) overshadowed problems in the script. Ben Brantley's review in The New York Times was headlined "A diorama with nostalgia rampant." It led the 1998 Tony Awards with thirteen nominations, but Disney's The Lion King won as Best Musical. The musical won awards for Best Featured Actress (McDonald), Original Score, Book, and Orchestrations. According to The New York Times, "The chief competition for The Lion King was Ragtime, a lavish musical." The paper also noted that "The season was an artistic success [and] one of the most competitive Tony contests in years" The expensive Broadway production's financial failure was a factor in Livent's declaring bankruptcy within a year. Drabinsky was convicted in 2009 of fraud for activities related to his operation of the company.

On March 26, 2021, Ahrens and Flaherty, joined by Mitchell, McDonald, Friedman, Jacoby, Kaye and Sutcliffe, reunited for a livestream on the web series Stars in the House.

=== West End ===
Following a concert performance at the Cardiff International Festival of Musical Theatre in 2002 (which was later telecast on BBC Four), the musical was produced in the West End, London, by Sonia Friedman at the Piccadilly Theatre from March 19 to June 14, 2003. It was directed by Stafford Arima and starred Maria Friedman as Mother, for which she won the 2004 Laurence Olivier Award for Best Actress in a Musical. Graham Bickley and Kevyn Morrow starred as Tateh and Coalhouse, respectively, and were both nominated for the Laurence Olivier Award for Best Actor in a Musical.

=== Revivals ===
==== 2009 Broadway ====
A production opened at the John F. Kennedy Center for the Performing Arts, Washington, DC, on April 18, 2009, and ran through May 17, 2009, with direction and choreography by Marcia Milgrom Dodge. It moved to Broadway at the Neil Simon Theatre, with previews beginning on October 23, 2009, and an official opening on November 15, 2009. The cast featured Stephanie Umoh (Sarah), Quentin Earl Darrington (Coalhouse), Christiane Noll (Mother), Robert Petkoff (Tateh), Bobby Steggert (Younger Brother), Donna Migliaccio (Emma) and Ron Bohmer (Father). This was the first Broadway revival of any 1990s musical. The production opened to critical acclaim but closed on January 10, 2010, after 28 previews and 65 performances. The large cast and orchestra resulted in a significant weekly running cost, making it difficult to succeed financially. "There ... was apparently not enough of an advance sale to encourage the producers" to keep it open into 2010. The production was nominated for seven Tony Awards, including Best Revival of Musical, Best Direction, Best Actress in Musical, and Best Featured Actor in a Musical. One nomination, for costume design, was withdrawn on the basis that the designs were substantially similar to those of a prior production.

==== 2025 Broadway ====
After an Encores! production at New York City Center in 2024, a revival began previews at the Vivian Beaumont Theater on September 26, 2025, with an official opening on October 16. Directed by Lear deBessonet, with choreography by Ellenore Scott, sets by David Korins and costumes by Linda Cho. It stars Joshua Henry as Coalhouse, Caissie Levy as Mother, Brandon Uranowitz as Tateh, Colin Donnell as Father, Shaina Taub as Emma, Ben Levi Ross as Younger Brother, Nichelle Lewis as Sarah, Anna Grace Barlow as Evelyn, John Clay III as Booker T. Washington, Rodd Cyrus as Houdini, Allison Blackwell as Sarah's Friend, and Jason Forbach as Henry Ford. It ran through August 16, 2026. A cast album was released on January 9, 2026. The production was nominated for eleven Tony Awards, winning four including Best Revival of a Musical.

The production is set to begin a North American tour in late 2027, with performances beginning in Buffalo, New York.

==== Off West End and off-Broadway ====
The Regent's Park Open Air Theatre played a revival of the musical from May 18 to September 8, 2012, directed by Timothy Sheader. The cast featured Claudia Kariuki (Sarah), Rolan Bell (Coalhouse), Rosalie Craig (Mother), John Marquez (Tateh), Harry Hepple (Younger Brother), Tamsin Carroll (Emma) and David Birrell (Father).

The Charing Cross Theatre played a revival of the musical from October 8 until December 10, 2016, directed by Thom Southerland. The actor-musician production featured Earl Carpenter (Father), Anita Louise Combe (Mother), Jonathan Stewart (Younger Brother), Ako Mitchell (Coalhouse), Jennifer Saayeng (Sarah) and Gary Tushaw (Tateh).

During the COVID-19 pandemic, Ragtime was at one point the only show in the UK to be playing to live audiences in a production presented by The Arts Educational Schools, London. The musical played in the Andrew Lloyd Webber Foundation Theatre from March 23 to 26, 2021. It was directed by Stephen Whitson, and the cast featured Akmed Junior Khemalai (Coalhouse), Beatrice Penny-Toure (Sarah), Lauren Jones (Mother), Jamie Chatterton (Father) and Benjamin Durham (Tateh).

An Off-Broadway production was staged as the annual gala performance of New York City Center's 2024–25 season. The show ran from October 30 to November 10, 2024. The cast included Joshua Henry as Coalhouse, Caissie Levy as Mother, Brandon Uranowitz (who replaced Dano as Edgar in Toronto) as Tateh, Colin Donnell as Father, Ben Levi Ross as Younger Brother, Shaina Taub as Emma, and Joy Woods, then Joaquina Kalukango, then Nichelle Lewis as Sarah. The production was directed by Lear deBessonet.

=== Regional and international productions ===
The Shaw Festival, Niagara-on-the-Lake, Ontario, presented Ragtime in 2012 from April 10 through October 14, 2012. The production was directed by Shaw Festival Artistic Director Jackie Maxwell. Coalhouse was played by Thom Allison, with Alana Hibbert as Sarah, Jay Turvey as Tateh, and Patty Jamieson as Mother. Standing Ovation Studios presented the musical at the Westchester Broadway Theater from February 27 to May 4, 2014. Seattle Washington's 5th Avenue Theatre produced Ragtime in October 2017, based on a streamlined production from Theatre Latte Da in Minneapolis, directed by Peter Rothstein. It had a stripped-down cast of 16 actors, and leading actors also played the ensemble.

The musical theatre company BærMuDa opened the first Scandinavian production on January 18, 2018, on the musical's twentieth anniversary of its first night on Broadway. It was the first time the musical was performed in a foreign language. The production was directed by Renate Stridh, and the cast featured Mimmi Tamba (Sarah), Marvin Charles Cummings (Coalhouse), Kristin Rinde (Mother), Christian Ranke (Tateh), Kristian Grønvold (Younger Brother), Lars Arne Rinde (Father), Henrik Rinde Sunde (Edgar), Marianne Snekkestad/Cecilie Due (Emma) and Trine Eide Schjølberg/Ida Rinde Sunde (Evelyn). It was translated by Christian Ranke and Cecilie Due. The set design was inspired by the suitcases on display at the Ellis Island immigrant museum.

Providence, Rhode Island's Trinity Repertory Company presented Ragtime in May 2018, directed by Curt Columbus, with Wilkie Ferguson III as Coalhouse. Mia Ellis as Sarah, Charlie Thurston as Tateh, Rachael Warren as Mother, and Rebecca Gibel as Evelyn. Arden Theatre in Philadelphia, Pennsylvania, presented the musical from September 19 to October 27, 2019, directed by Terrence J. Nolen, with Nkrumah Gatling as Coalhouse, Terran Scott as Sarah, Cooper Grodin as Tateh, and Kim Carson as Mother. https://ardentheatre.org/event/ragtime/2019-09-19/ Signature Theatre in Arlington, Virginia, presented Ragtime as part of its 2023–2024 season in a production directed by Matthew Gardiner. In 2023 Broadway Sacramento in California played the show in the round, directed by Gerry McIntyre.

==== Concerts ====
Manhattan Concert Productions presented a one-night-only concert of the musical on February 18, 2013, at the Avery Fisher Hall at Lincoln Center, directed by Stafford Arima. The cast featured Lea Salonga (Mother), Patina Miller (Sarah), Norm Lewis (Coalhouse), Tyne Daly (Emma), Kerry Butler (Evelyn), Howard McGillin (Father), Michael Arden (Younger Brother), Manoel Felciano (Tateh), Lilla Crawford (Little Girl) and Phillip Boykin (Washington).

A "developmental concert" of the musical was presented on Ellis Island on August 8, 2016, directed by Sammi Cannold. It featured Brian Stokes Mitchell as the narrator, Laura Michelle Kelly as Mother, Andy Mientus as Younger Brother, Brandon Victor Dixon as Coalhouse, Michael Park as Father, Shaina Taub as Emma, Aisha Jackson as Sarah and Robert Petkoff reprising his 2009 Broadway revival role of Tateh. The concert was featured on an episode of the Working in the Theatre series run by the American Theatre Wing. There were plans to hold a 2018 workshop where the sound from the show would be live-mixed into wireless headphones worn by each audience member.

A concert benefitting the Entertainment Community Fund (previously The Actors Fund) was held March 27, 2023, at the Minskoff Theatre. It was directed by Stafford Arima and featured many of the original Broadway cast, including Mitchell McDonald, Jacoby, Sutcliffe, Kaye, and Friedman. Kelli O'Hara played the role of Mother. The concert, dedicated to the memories of cast and crew, including Mazzie, McNally and Galati, was postponed for three years due to the COVID-19 pandemic. It was filmed in 2024, but has not been released.

== Synopsis ==
=== Act one ===
Narration by J. P. Morgan, Henry Ford, Booker T. Washington, Emma Goldman, Harry Houdini, and Evelyn Nesbit connects three families: an upper-class White family from New Rochelle – Little Boy (Edgar), his Father (who runs a fireworks factory), Mother, Mother's Younger Brother, and Grandfather; a Black couple from Harlem in New York City – Sarah, who adores the pianist Coalhouse Walker Jr.; and Jewish immigrants from Europe on the Lower East Side – Latvian artist Tateh and his young daughter (“Prologue: Ragtime”).

As Father leaves on Robert Peary's 1909 expedition to the North Pole, he asks Mother to oversee his affairs and assures her that nothing will change in his absence, but Mother feels adrift without her husband to guide her (“Goodbye, My Love”). A "rag ship" arrives, carrying a hopeful Tateh and his Little Girl to America, while Mother wishes Father safe passage (“Journey On”). Meanwhile, Mother's Younger Brother, an intense and awkward young man yearning for purpose who works at Father's fireworks factory, attends the vaudeville act of Evelyn Nesbit, a young woman who became famous after her wealthy lover Stanford White was killed by her millionaire husband Harry K. Thaw (“Crime of the Century”). After her show ends, Younger Brother confesses his love to Evelyn. She kisses him, but only for the benefit of a press photographer, then cheerfully rejects him afterward.

At home in New Rochelle, Mother discovers a still-living newborn Black baby, partly buried alive in her garden. The police arrive with Sarah, the baby's mother. Pitying her, Mother takes responsibility for Sarah and her child. Brother thanks her. Surprised at herself, she remarks that her husband would never have allowed her to make such a decision (“What Kind of Woman”). At Ellis Island, the immigrants arrive (“A Shtetl Iz Amereke”). Tateh eagerly begins his new life, drawing silhouettes and selling them on the street. He and Little Girl quickly descend into poverty. Emma attempts to get him to join the Socialist movement, but he refuses. A wealthy man even offers to purchase Little Girl, whom Tateh now keeps on a leash for safety. Inspired by immigrant magician Harry Houdini, Tateh resolves to begin again somewhere else (“Success”). In Harlem, Coalhouse, a popular pianist, informs his audience that he's finally found his lost love, Sarah, and is going to win her back (“His Name Was Coalhouse”/“Gettin' Ready Rag”). He then purchases a Model T while Henry Ford and his workers glorify industry (“Henry Ford”).

Tateh and Little Girl leave for Boston; en route, they meet Mother and Edgar in New Rochelle and politely make conversation (“Nothing Like the City”). At Mother's home, Sarah explains her desperate actions to her baby (“Your Daddy's Son”). Also en route to New Rochelle, Coalhouse is harassed by a racist fire squad led by Chief Willie Conklin, who taunt him for driving his own car. He arrives at Mother's house, where he has heard a Black woman is living. He is stunned to learn of the baby's existence, and when Sarah refuses to see him, he returns weekly (“The Courtship”) until Mother invites him inside. Grandfather asks Coalhouse to play a minstrel song on the parlor piano; instead, Coalhouse plays a ragtime song. Father returns home while Coalhouse is playing, and is stunned by the changes to his family's life, while Mother and Younger Brother are proud of her choices. Eventually, Sarah reconciles with Coalhouse (“New Music”). The two go on an idyllic picnic where, inspired by the words of Booker T. Washington, he dreams of a just, future America that their son will grow up in (“Wheels of a Dream”).

At a worker's hall, Younger Brother hears Emma speak passionately about a textile mills strike in Lawrence, Massachusetts, where Tateh and his daughter are among those targeted by federal troops and strikebreakers. Younger Brother imagines that Emma is speaking directly to him (“The Night That Goldman Spoke at Union Square”). Emma is arrested, prompting a riot that mirrors the chaos in Lawrence, where Tateh is beaten by a policeman. He and Little Girl escape Lawrence on a train; he gives his daughter a flip book of moving silhouettes to calm her. The train conductor offers to buy the book, and Tateh, hurriedly dubbing it a "movie-book", sells it for a dollar. Tateh realizes that "movie-books" may be a route out of poverty (“Gliding”).

Returning to New Rochelle, Coalhouse and Sarah are stopped by Conklin and the fire squad, who demand a fictitious toll; Coalhouse refuses. A lecture by Washington on patience and dignity is juxtaposed against the white firemen's destruction of Coalhouse's new Model T (“The Trashing of the Car”). Coalhouse vows legal action (“Justice”), postponing his marriage to Sarah until he gets justice. Sarah goes to a campaign rally nearby to ask for help from the vice-presidential candidate; as she approaches, J. P. Morgan shouts, "She's got a gun!" and Sarah is beaten to death by the Secret Service (“President”). At her funeral, Black mourners demand an end to such injustice and pray for true equality. Mother, Father, Younger Brother, Tateh and Emma look on as Coalhouse weeps at Sarah's grave (“Till We Reach That Day”).

=== Act two ===
Edgar wakes up screaming from a nightmare in which Houdini attempts a daring escape after being locked in a dynamite-laden box by Willie Conklin ("Harry Houdini, Master Escapist"). This dream proves prophetic: news arrives that a volunteer firehouse has been bombed. Coalhouse has vowed to get justice on his own terms (“Coalhouse's Soliloquy”) and now terrorizes New Rochelle while demanding his car be restored to him and that Conklin be delivered to him. Washington condemns Coalhouse's actions (“Coalhouse Demands”). In the chaos, Mother retains custody of Sarah and Coalhouse's baby. Father blames her for bringing this turmoil into their lives, but Younger Brother lambastes him for his blindness and storms out of the house. Mother grows increasingly offended by her husband's ignorant outlook. Father, to distract Edgar from the unrest, takes his son to a baseball game, but feels alienated from the raucous, working-class crowd, and begins to realize that his genteel way of life is passing (“What a Game”). Coalhouse's campaign continues (“Fire in the City”), and so Father decides to temporarily move the family to Atlantic City.

In Atlantic City, Evelyn's career is on the downslide and Houdini has become intrigued by the supernatural and the afterlife following the death of his mother (“Atlantic City”). Edgar cryptically shouts "Warn the Duke!" to Houdini. Mother encounters Tateh again, not recognizing him from their brief meeting months ago; now a wealthy filmmaker, he has re-invented himself as "the Baron Ashkenazy" and is directing a silent movie in Atlantic City (“Buffalo Nickel Photoplay, Inc.”). Edgar and Little Girl soon become fast friends, prompting Mother and Tateh to become friends as well; eventually, Tateh reveals who he is, and they grow even closer (“Our Children”).

Back in Harlem, Younger Brother seeks out Coalhouse but is repeatedly turned away until Coalhouse is convinced that he can be trusted. Coalhouse has banished music from his life but watches a carefree young couple ("Harlem Nightclub") and recalls meeting Sarah (“Sarah Brown Eyes”). Younger Brother meets with him but is inarticulate and nervous: his profound thoughts, narrated to the audience by Emma, stand in contrast to the only phrase he can muster: "I know how to blow things up." (“He Wanted to Say”). With Younger Brother's help, Coalhouse and his men take over Morgan's magnificent library in the heart of New York City, threatening to blow it up. Father is summoned to help reason with Coalhouse. Before he goes, he assures Mother that everything will soon return to the way it was, but Mother knows such hopes are naive (“Back to Before”). Meeting with the police, Father devises a mediation strategy involving Washington, whom Coalhouse allows to enter the library. Washington, invoking the violent legacy Coalhouse is leaving his son, works out a deal with Coalhouse. Younger Brother is enraged at Coalhouse's abandonment of their cause (“Look What You've Done”).

Washington leaves and Father enters the library as a hostage. There, he finally realizes the profundity of society's troubles while seeing Coalhouse convince Younger Brother and his men that violence cannot solve injustice. Coalhouse exhorts them to fight through the power of their words (“Make Them Hear You”). Coalhouse's sacrifice and oratory convince Younger Brother and the men to leave while Father tells Coalhouse about his son. Coalhouse thanks Father for his kindness. Once he leaves the library, Coalhouse is shot dead by the police.

Edgar appears to introduce the Epilogue. Younger Brother departs for Mexico to fight for Emiliano Zapata. Emma is arrested and deported. Washington establishes the Tuskegee Institute, while Evelyn fades into obscurity. Houdini realizes upon the assassination of Archduke Franz Ferdinand that Edgar's shout of "Warn the Duke!" was a true mystical experience. Father dies aboard the RMS Lusitania; after a year of mourning, Mother marries Tateh, adopts Coalhouse and Sarah's son, and moves to California. Tateh is struck by an idea for a film series centering on a diverse group of children banding together. The ghosts of Coalhouse and Sarah watch their son grow up (“Epilogue: Ragtime/Wheels of a Dream: Reprise”).

== Musical numbers ==
Act I

- Prologue: "Ragtime" – Company
- "Goodbye, My Love" – Mother
- "Journey On" – Father, Tateh, and Mother
- "The Crime of the Century" ‡ – Evelyn Nesbit, Younger Brother, Judge, Foreman, and Ensemble
- "What Kind of Woman" – Mother
- "A Shtetl iz Amereke" – Ensemble
- "Success" – Tateh, J. P. Morgan, Harry Houdini, Emma Goldman, and Ensemble
- "His Name Was Coalhouse Walker" – Coalhouse and Harlem Ensemble
- "Gettin' Ready Rag" – Coalhouse and Harlem Ensemble
- "Henry Ford" ‡ – Henry Ford, Coalhouse, and Ensemble
- "Nothing Like the City" – Mother, Edgar, Tateh, and Little Girl
- "Your Daddy's Son" – Sarah
- "The Courtship" – Coalhouse, Mother, and Company
- "New Music" – Father, Mother, Younger Brother, Coalhouse, Sarah, and Company
- "Wheels of a Dream" – Coalhouse and Sarah
- "The Night That Goldman Spoke at Union Square" ‡ – Younger Brother, Emma, and Ensemble
- "Gliding" – Tateh
- "The Trashing of the Car" – Willie Conklin, Booker T. Washington, Firefighters, Coalhouse, Sarah, and Orchestra
- "Justice" ‡ – Coalhouse and Company
- "President"‡ – Sarah
- "Till We Reach That Day" – Sarah's Friend, Coalhouse, Emma, Mother, Younger Brother, Tateh, and Company

Act II

- Entr'acte – Orchestra
- "Harry Houdini, Master Escapist" ≠ – Houdini and Edgar
- "Coalhouse's Soliloquy" – Coalhouse
- "Coalhouse Demands"‡ – Coalhouse, Washington, Will, and Ensemble
- "What a Game" – Father, Edgar, and Men
- "Fire in the City" – Orchestra
- "New Music (Reprise)" – Father
- "Atlantic City" ‡ – Evelyn, Houdini, Father, Mother, and Company
- "Buffalo Nickel Photoplay, Inc." – Tateh
- "Our Children" – Mother and Tateh
- "Harlem Nightclub" – Orchestra
- "Sarah Brown Eyes" – Coalhouse and Sarah
- "He Wanted to Say" ‡ – Younger Brother, Emma, Coalhouse, and Men
- "Back to Before" – Mother
- "Look What You've Done" – Washington, Coalhouse, and Company
- "Make Them Hear You" – Coalhouse°
- Epilogue: "Ragtime" / "Wheels of a Dream" (reprise) – Coalhouse, Sarah, and Company
- "Exit music" – Orchestra*

Notes:

*The original cast recording features a bonus track titled "The Ragtime Symphonic Suite" rather than the exit music composition. The suite premiered at the Hollywood Bowl on July 4, 1997, months before the Broadway transfer. The piece is orchestrated by David Brohn and was conducted by John Mauceri, with original musical director David Loud playing piano.

‡ - shortened in the 2009 Broadway revival

≠ - cut from the 2009 Broadway revival and the 2025 Broadway revival

°Make Them Hear You is included in the 2026 CBS News list of the 250 essential American songs.

== Orchestration ==
The Tony Award-winning orchestration by William David Brohn consists of a standard musical theatre pit orchestra of 26 musicians. On the original cast recording, the orchestra was expanded to 38 players.

== Casts and characters ==
Character	Toronto	Los Angeles	Broadway	US Tour	West End	Broadway Revival	Broadway Revival
Character	1996	1997		1998	2003	2009	2025
Coalhouse Walker, Jr.	Brian Stokes Mitchell	Brian Stokes Mitchell	Brian Stokes Mitchell	Alton Fitzgerald White	Kevyn Morrow	Quentin Earl Darrington	Joshua Henry
Mother	Marin Mazzie	Marcia Mitzman Gaven	Marin Mazzie	Rebecca Eichenberger	Maria Friedman	Christiane Noll	Caissie Levy
Tateh	Peter Friedman	John Rubinstein	Peter Friedman	Michael Rupert	Graham Bickley	Robert Petkoff	Brandon Uranowitz
Sarah	Audra McDonald	LaChanze	Audra McDonald	Darlesia Cearcy	Emma Jay Thomas	Stephanie Umoh	Nichelle Lewis
Father	Mark Jacoby	John Dossett	Mark Jacoby	Cris Groenendaal	Dave Willetts	Ron Bohmer	Colin Donnell
Mother's Younger Brother	Steven Sutcliffe	Scott Carollo	Steven Sutcliffe	Aloysius Gigl	Matthew White	Bobby Steggert	Ben Levi Ross
Emma Goldman	Camille Saviola	Judy Kaye	Judy Kaye	Theresa Tova	Susie McKenna	Donna Migliaccio	Shaina Taub
Evelyn Nesbit	Lynnette Perry	Susan Wood	Lynnette Perry	Melissa Dye	Rebecca Thornhill	Savannah Wise	Anna Grace Barlow
Booker T. Washington	Richard Allen	Allan Louis	Tommy Hollis	Allan Louis	David Durham	Eric Jordan Young	John Clay III
Harry Houdini	Jim Corti	Jason Graae	Jim Corti	Bernie Yvon	Samuel James	Jonathan Hammond	Rodd Cyrus
Henry Ford	Larry Daggett	Bill Carmichael	Larry Daggett	Larry Cahn	Iain Davey	Aaron Galligan-Stierle	Jason Forbach
The Little Boy (Edgar)	Paul Dano	Blake McIver Ewing	Alex Strange	Nathan Keen	Thomas Brown Loye; Jordan Calvert; Matthew Protheroe	Christopher Cox	Nick Barrington
The Little Girl	Lea Michele	Danielle Wiener	Lea Michele	Amy Carrey	Natasha Jules Bernard; Sarah Bowling; Ruby Williams	Sarah Rosenthal	Tabitha Lawing

=== Notable replacements ===
Toronto (1996)

- The Little Boy: Brandon Uranowitz

Broadway (1998–2000)

- Mother: Donna Bullock
- Coalhouse Walker, Jr.: James Stovall
- Tateh: John Rubinstein, Michael Rupert
- Father: John Dossett
- Sarah: LaChanze

Broadway (2025–2026)

- Father: Ben Davis
- Emma Goldman: Julie Benko

== Awards and nominations ==
=== Original Broadway production ===
Year	Award ceremony	Category	Nominee	Result	Ref.
1998	Tony Awards	Best Musical		Nominated	
1998	Tony Awards	Best Book of a Musical	Terrence McNally	Won	
1998	Tony Awards	Best Original Score	Stephen Flaherty and Lynn Ahrens	Won	
1998	Tony Awards	Best Performance by a Leading Actor in a Musical	Peter Friedman	Nominated	
1998	Tony Awards	Best Performance by a Leading Actor in a Musical	Brian Stokes Mitchell	Nominated	
1998	Tony Awards	Best Performance by a Leading Actress in a Musical	Marin Mazzie	Nominated	
1998	Tony Awards	Best Performance by a Featured Actress in a Musical	Audra McDonald	Won	
1998	Tony Awards	Best Direction of a Musical	Frank Galati	Nominated	
1998	Tony Awards	Best Choreography	Graciela Daniele	Nominated	
1998	Tony Awards	Best Orchestrations	William David Brohn	Won	
1998	Tony Awards	Best Scenic Design	Eugene Lee	Nominated	
1998	Tony Awards	Best Costume Design	Santo Loquasto	Nominated	
1998	Tony Awards	Best Lighting Design	Jules Fisher and Peggy Eisenhauer	Nominated	
1998	Drama Desk Awards	Outstanding Musical		Won	
1998	Drama Desk Awards	Outstanding Book of a Musical	Terrence McNally	Won	
1998	Drama Desk Awards	Outstanding Actor in a Musical	Peter Friedman	Nominated	
1998	Drama Desk Awards	Outstanding Actor in a Musical	Brian Stokes Mitchell	Nominated	
1998	Drama Desk Awards	Outstanding Actress in a Musical	Marin Mazzie	Nominated	
1998	Drama Desk Awards	Outstanding Featured Actor in a Musical	Steven Sutcliffe	Nominated	
1998	Drama Desk Awards	Outstanding Director of a Musical	Frank Galati	Nominated	
1998	Drama Desk Awards	Outstanding Choreography	Graciela Daniele	Nominated	
1998	Drama Desk Awards	Outstanding Orchestrations	William David Brohn	Won	
1998	Drama Desk Awards	Outstanding Lyrics	Lynn Ahrens	Won	
1998	Drama Desk Awards	Outstanding Music	Stephen Flaherty	Won	
1998	Drama Desk Awards	Outstanding Set Design	Eugene Lee and Wendall K. Harrington	Nominated	
1998	Drama Desk Awards	Outstanding Costume Design	Santo Loquasto	Nominated	
1998	Drama Desk Awards	Outstanding Lighting Design	Jules Fisher and Peggy Eisenhauer	Nominated	
1998	New York Drama Critics' Circle Awards	Best Musical	Stephen Flaherty, Lynn Ahrens and Terrence McNally	Runner-up	
1998	Outer Critics Circle Awards	Outstanding Broadway Musical		Won	
1998	Outer Critics Circle Awards	Outstanding Director of a Musical	Frank Galati	Nominated	
1998	Outer Critics Circle Awards	Outstanding Actor in a Musical	Brian Stokes Mitchell	Nominated	
1998	Outer Critics Circle Awards	Outstanding Actress in a Musical	Marin Mazzie	Nominated	
1998	Outer Critics Circle Awards	Outstanding Featured Actor in a Musical	Peter Friedman	Won	
1998	Outer Critics Circle Awards	Outstanding Featured Actress in a Musical	Audra McDonald	Nominated	
1998	Outer Critics Circle Awards	Outstanding Choreography	Graciela Daniele	Nominated	
1998	Outer Critics Circle Awards	Outstanding Scenic Design	Eugene Lee	Nominated	
1998	Outer Critics Circle Awards	Outstanding Costume Design	Santo Loquasto	Nominated	
1998	Outer Critics Circle Awards	Outstanding Lighting Design	Jules Fisher and Peggy Eisenhauser	Nominated	

=== Original London production ===
Year	Award ceremony	Category	Nominee	Result
2004	Laurence Olivier Awards	Best New Musical		Nominated
2004	Laurence Olivier Awards	Best Actor in a Musical	Graham Bickley	Nominated
2004	Laurence Olivier Awards	Best Actor in a Musical	Kevyn Morrow	Nominated
2004	Laurence Olivier Awards	Best Actress in a Musical	Maria Friedman	Won
2004	Laurence Olivier Awards	Best Performance in a Supporting Role in a Musical	Matthew White	Nominated
2004	Laurence Olivier Awards	Best Director	Stafford Arima	Nominated
2004	Laurence Olivier Awards	Best Lighting Design	Howard Harrison	Nominated
2004	Laurence Olivier Awards	Best Sound Design	Peter Kylenski	Nominated

=== 2009 Broadway revival ===
Year	Award ceremony	Category	Nominee	Result
2010	Tony Awards	Best Revival of a Musical		Nominated
2010	Tony Awards	Best Performance by a Leading Actress in a Musical	Christiane Noll	Nominated
2010	Tony Awards	Best Performance by a Featured Actor in a Musical	Bobby Steggert	Nominated
2010	Tony Awards	Best Direction of a Musical	Marcia Milgrom Dodge	Nominated
2010	Tony Awards	Best Scenic Design	Derek McLane	Nominated
2010	Tony Awards	Best Lighting Design	Donald Holder	Nominated
2010	Drama Desk Awards	Outstanding Revival of a Musical		Nominated
2010	Drama Desk Awards	Outstanding Actress in a Musical	Christiane Noll	Nominated
2010	Drama Desk Awards	Outstanding Featured Actor in a Musical	Bobby Steggert	Nominated
2010	Drama Desk Awards	Outstanding Director of a Musical	Marcia Milgrom Dodge	Nominated
2010	Drama Desk Awards	Outstanding Choreography	Marcia Milgrom Dodge	Nominated
2010	Drama Desk Awards	Outstanding Set Design	Derek McLane	Nominated
2010	Drama Desk Awards	Outstanding Sound Design	Acme Sound Partners	Won

=== 2025 Broadway revival ===
Year	Award ceremony	Category	Nominee	Result	Ref.
2026	Drama League Awards	Outstanding Revival of a Musical		Won	
2026	Drama League Awards	Outstanding Direction of a Musical	Lear deBessonet	Won	
2026	Drama League Awards	Distinguished Performance	Caissie Levy	Nominated	
2026	Drama League Awards	Distinguished Performance	Joshua Henry	Won	
2026	Drama League Awards	Distinguished Performance	Brandon Uranowitz	Nominated	
2026	Outer Critics Circle Awards	Outstanding Revival of a Musical		Won	
2026	Outer Critics Circle Awards	Outstanding Lead Performer in a Broadway Musical	Joshua Henry	Won	
2026	Outer Critics Circle Awards	Outstanding Lead Performer in a Broadway Musical	Brandon Uranowitz	Nominated	
2026	Outer Critics Circle Awards	Outstanding Featured Performer in a Broadway Musical	Ben Levi Ross	Won	
2026	Drama Desk Awards	Outstanding Revival of a Musical		Won	
2026	Drama Desk Awards	Outstanding Lead Performance in a Musical	Joshua Henry	Won	
2026	Drama Desk Awards	Outstanding Lead Performance in a Musical	Caissie Levy	Won	
2026	Drama Desk Awards	Outstanding Lead Performance in a Musical	Brandon Uranowitz	Nominated	
2026	Drama Desk Awards	Outstanding Featured Performance in a Musical	Ben Levi Ross	Won	
2026	Drama Desk Awards	Outstanding Direction of a Musical	Lear deBessonet	Won	
2026	Tony Awards	Best Revival of a Musical		Won	
2026	Tony Awards	Best Actor in a Musical	Joshua Henry	Won	
2026	Tony Awards	Best Actor in a Musical	Brandon Uranowitz	Nominated	
2026	Tony Awards	Best Actress in a Musical	Caissie Levy	Won	
2026	Tony Awards	Best Featured Actor in a Musical	Ben Levi Ross	Nominated	
2026	Tony Awards	Best Featured Actress in a Musical	Nichelle Lewis	Nominated	
2026	Tony Awards	Best Direction of a Musical	Lear deBessonet	Nominated	
2026	Tony Awards	Best Choreography	Ellenore Scott	Nominated	
2026	Tony Awards	Best Costume Design of a Musical	Linda Cho	Nominated	
2026	Tony Awards	Best Lighting Design of a Musical	Donald Holder and Adam Honoré	Nominated	
2026	Tony Awards	Best Sound Design of a Musical	Kai Harada	Won	
2026	Dorian Awards	Outstanding Broadway Musical Revival		Won	
2026	Dorian Awards	Outstanding Lead Performance in a Broadway Musical	Joshua Henry	Won	
2026	Dorian Awards	Outstanding Lead Performance in a Broadway Musical	Caissie Levy	Nominated	
2026	Dorian Awards	Outstanding Lead Performance in a Broadway Musical	Brandon Uranowitz	Nominated	
2026	Dorian Awards	Outstanding Featured Performance in a Broadway Musical	Ben Levi Ross	Nominated	
2026	Dorian Awards	Outstanding Broadway Ensemble	Company	Won	

== Adaptation ==
McNally, Ahrens, and Flaherty created a "new symphonic arrangement" of the musical titled Ragtime: The Symphonic Concert. It premiered at the Cincinnati Symphony Orchestra in April 2023 conducted by John Morris Russell. It was also performed in May 2023 with Keith Lockhart leading the Boston Pops Orchestra at Symphonic Hall and again in July 2023 at Tanglewood.
