= Donna Bullock (actress) =

American actress (born 1955)

- Born: December 11, 1955 (age 69); Dallas, Texas, U.S.
- Occupation: Actress
- Years active: 1987–present
- Spouse: Sherman Howard (m. 1988)
- Children: 1

Donna Bullock (born December 11, 1955, in Dallas, Texas) is an American stage, television, and movie actress. Her first credits on television were for the first season of Dallas in 1978. Her most notable film roles include Air Force One and The Girl Next Door. Television credits include Monk, As The World Turns, All My Children, Tales from the Darkside, Murder, She Wrote, Matlock, Columbo, Smallville, and The Division, among others. Her roles on stage include in plays such as A Class Act, Ragtime, and City of Angels.
