= Lynn Ahrens =

American writer and lyricist (born 1948)

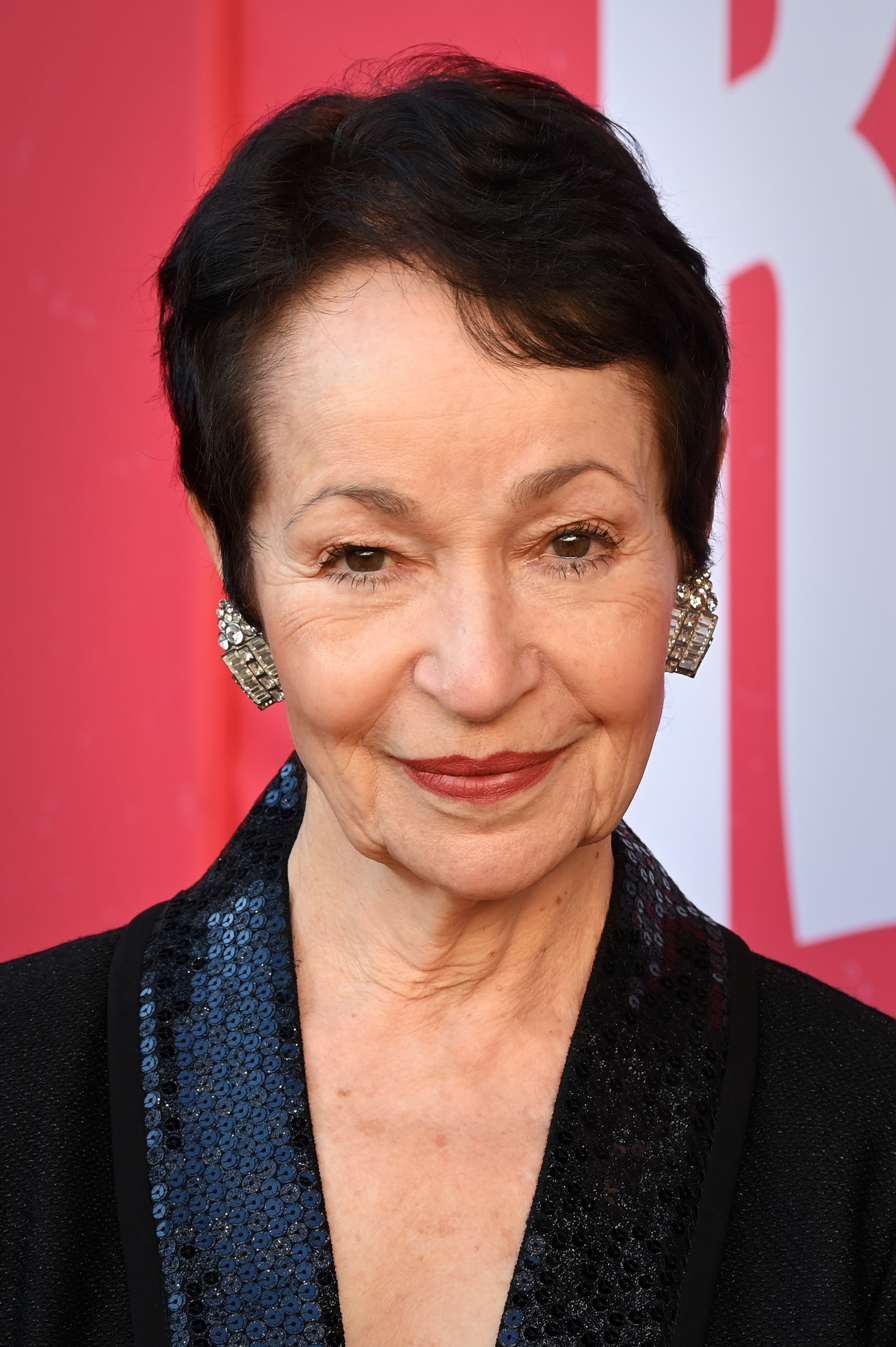
- Ahrens in 2025
- Born: October 1, 1948 (age 78); New York City, New York, U.S.
- Education: Syracuse University (BA)
- Occupations: Lyricist, librettist
- Years active: 1973–present
- Spouse: Neil Costa (m. 1989)
- Website: ahrensandflaherty.com

Lynn Ahrens (born October 1, 1948) is an American writer and lyricist for the musical theatre, television and film. She has collaborated with Stephen Flaherty for many years. She won the Tony Award, Drama Desk Award, and Outer Critics Circle Award for the Broadway musical Ragtime. Together with Flaherty, she has written many musicals, including Lucky Stiff, My Favorite Year, Ragtime, Seussical, A Man of No Importance, Dessa Rose, The Glorious Ones, Rocky, Little Dancer, Anastasia, and Once on This Island.

She was also nominated for two Academy Awards and two Golden Globe Awards for the animated Twentieth Century Fox film Anastasia. She wrote the teleplay of her 1994 musical adaption of A Christmas Carol, with music by Alan Menken and lyrics by Ahrens. She was a mainstay writer and performer for ABC-TV's Schoolhouse Rock! Ahrens also wrote lyrics for the title song for After the Storm, the documentary film about young Hurricane Katrina survivors putting on Once On This Island.

== Biography ==
Ahrens was born in New York City. She grew up in Neptune Township, New Jersey, where she graduated from Neptune High School on the Jersey shore in 1966. She graduated from Syracuse University with a degree in Journalism and English. She is Jewish.

She then began a career in advertising as a copywriter for McCaffrey and McCall. It was her first job out of college. She was living with her ex-husband in Flushing, sleeping on the floor of his sister's apartment. While working as a secretary/copywriter, she would bring her guitar to play and write songs during lunch. George Newall was passing by and asked her casually to write a song for Schoolhouse Rock!. She wrote "The Preamble", and it went on the air with Ahrens singing it. After that she began regularly writing songs for the show. She subsequently worked as a freelance composer and singer of commercial music, and wrote and produced a number of songs for children's television, particularly Captain Kangaroo. She began writing for the musical theater in 1982.

She married Neil Costa in 1989.

=== Theatre ===
Ahrens met Stephen Flaherty at the BMI Lehman Engel Musical Theatre Workshop in 1982 and they started working together the following year. Their first collaboration was Bedazzled, based on the 1967 film of the same name, but had to abandon it when they could not secure the rights. They did some workshops, where Ira Weitzman noticed them and he was able to get the pair a NEA grant. Weitzman also connected the pair with George C. Wolfe, and they collaborated on a piece called Antler, but according to Ahrens, "no one could figure it out." The pairs' first produced musical was a children's musical, The Emperor's New Clothes for Theatreworks USA.

Their first professionally produced musical together was Lucky Stiff, which premiered Off-Broadway at Playwrights Horizons in April 1988. Their next musical was Once on This Island, which premiered on Broadway in 1990 and which was nominated for eight Tony Awards. My Favorite Year opened at the Vivian Beaumont Theater in Lincoln Center in October 1992 and ran for 36 performances, winning the Tony Award for Andrea Martin as Best Supporting Actress.

Ragtime followed, opening on Broadway in January 1998 and running for 834 performances. Ragtime was nominated for twelve Tony Awards and won the Best Original Score for Lynn Ahrens and Stephen Flaherty in addition to the Drama Desk Award for Outstanding Lyrics. Ragtime was revived on Broadway in 2009, and was nominated for seven Tony Awards.

Seussical opened on Broadway in November 2000, and received a Grammy nomination. The musical later ran Off-Broadway in 2007, where it was nominated for the Lucille Lortel Award as Outstanding Revival and the Drama League Award as Distinguished Revival of a Musical. This is one of the most performed musicals in the US.

Ahrens and Flaherty's next musicals, A Man of No Importance (2002), Dessa Rose (2005), and The Glorious Ones (2007) were produced at the Mitzi E. Newhouse Theater in Lincoln Center. They have frequently worked with director and choreographer Graciela Daniele.

They wrote original songs for the Chita Rivera autobiographical show, Chita Rivera: The Dancer's Life, in 2005.

Their musical version of Rocky the Musical premiered in Hamburg, Germany in October 2012. The show is based on the film Rocky and has a book by Thomas Meehan.

Rocky the Musical opened on Broadway at the Winter Garden Theatre on February 11, 2014 (previews), and officially opened on March 13, 2014. The musical is directed by Alex Timbers, with boxing choreography by Steven Hoggett and choreography by Kelly Devine. The former occupant of the Winter Garden Theatre, the musical Mamma Mia!, transferred to the Broadhurst Theatre in November 2013. Andy Karl and Margo Seibert are featured as Rocky Balboa and Adrian.

They have written a dance musical, Little Dancer, with direction and choreography by Susan Stroman, about a ballerina and Edgar Degas, which had a reading in 2010 at Lincoln Center Theater and a developmental lab production in June 2012. Little Dancer premiered at the Kennedy Center, Eisenhower Theater in October 2014 and closed on November 30, 2014. The cast starred Rebecca Luker, Boyd Gaines and Tiler Peck. The musical had a private reading on March 28, 2016, after having been revised.

Ahrens and Flaherty wrote the songs for the stage adaptation of the film Anastasia. The musical premiered at Hartford Stage (Connecticut) from May 12, 2016, to June 12. Director Darko Tresnjak said, "We've kept, I think, six songs from the movie, but there are 16 new numbers. We've kept the best parts of the animated movie, but it really is a new musical." The book is by Terrence McNally.

With a book by Frank Galati, music by Flaherty, and lyrics by Ahrens, Knoxville premiered at the Asolo Repertory Theatre in spring 2020, based on the Pulitzer Prize winning book A Death in the Family by James Agee and Pulitzer Prize winning play All the Way Home by Tad Mosel. It will star Jason Danieley as Author.

On her working relationship with Flaherty, Ahrens has commented, "Our lives have been very different ... But our sensibilities are very similar."

=== Film and television ===
In 1992, Flaherty and Ahrens were signed by Disney to write Song of the Sea, a coming of age story about a whale, in the era of Disney films known as the Disney Renaissance. The project stalled and was never completed.

Ahrens and Flaherty also collaborated on songs for the animated movie Anastasia (1997), receiving two Academy Award and Golden Globe nominations for Best Song and Best Score. The end title song "At The Beginning" went to Number One, and the soundtrack went Gold.

Ahrens has written music and lyrics for and performed on the animated television series Schoolhouse Rock from 1973 to 2009.

Ahrens has also written a few songs for Captain Kangaroo since the mid 1970s, including the 1982 theme song, "Here Comes Captain Kangaroo".

Ahrens wrote the teleplay for the 2004 television musical A Christmas Carol, starring Kelsey Grammer, Jane Krakowski, and Jason Alexander.

With composer Michael Gore, she contributed two songs, "Here's Where I Stand" and "I Sing For You", to the IFC feature film, Camp (2003).

With Stephen Flaherty, she wrote lyrics for the title song for After the Storm, the documentary film about young Hurricane Katrina survivors putting on Once On This Island.

=== Other ===
Ahrens writes short stories which have appeared in The Kenyon Review, Calyx, Glimmer Train Stories and others. Her personal essays have appeared in Narrative Magazine and have been nominated for "Best American Essays" and the "Pushcart Anthology".

Ahrens and Flaherty gave a series of concerts of their work in Hobart, Melbourne and Sydney, Australia from September 4 to 13, 2009.

Ahrens is a lifetime member of the Council of the Dramatists Guild of America, and is a founder and co-chair of the Dramatists Guild Fellows Program for Emerging Writers.

She wrote text for the concert piece With Voices Raised (composer, Stephen Flaherty), which was commissioned by the Boston Pops Orchestra in 2000.

She wrote text for the concert piece The Dream Lives On: A Portrait of the Kennedy Brothers (composer, Peter Boyer), which was commissioned and performed by the Boston Pops in 2009, and narrated by Robert De Niro, Ed Harris, Morgan Freeman and Cherry Jones.

She wrote lyrics for the choral piece, "The Song I Sing" (music composed by Stephen Flaherty), commissioned by the Young People's Chorus of New York, and performed at Carnegie Hall by a chorus of 1000 children.

== Musicals ==
- The Emperor's New Clothes (1985)
- Lucky Stiff (1988) (book and lyrics)
- Once on This Island (1990) (book and lyrics)
- My Favorite Year (1992) (lyrics)
- A Christmas Carol (1994–2004) (co-book and lyrics) (produced as a TV film in 2004) (teleplay)
- Ragtime (1998) (lyrics)
- Seussical (2000) (book and lyrics)
- A Man of No Importance (2002) (lyrics)
- Dessa Rose (2005) (book and lyrics)
- Chita Rivera: The Dancer's Life (2005) (lyrics—special material)
- The Glorious Ones (2007) (book and lyrics)
- Rocky the Musical (2012) (lyrics)
- Little Dancer (2014) (book and lyrics)
- Anastasia (2016) (lyrics)
- Knoxville (2022) (lyrics)

=== Contributions ===
- "I Eat", contribution to The Seven Deadly Sins: A Song Cycle for Audra McDonald
- Music and lyrics for "Interplanet Janet", "No More Kings", "The Preamble", "The Great American Melting Pot", "A Noun is a Person, Place or Thing", and many others, contributions to Schoolhouse Rock!
- Songs for Captain Kangaroo, notably "There's So Much To Do" and the 1982—1985 theme song, "Here Comes Captain Kangaroo"

== Awards and nominations ==
- Emmy Award Best Informational Daytime Program "H.E.L.P" — (winner)
- Tony Award Best Book of a Musical (1991) Once on This Island — (nominee)
- Tony Award Best Original Score (1991) Once on This Island — (nominee)
- Olivier Award, London West End — Once on This Island — Best Musical (1995) — (winner)
- Academy Award, Anastasia (1998) — Best Music, Original Musical or Comedy Score (with Stephen Flaherty and David Newman) and Best Original Song (with Stephen Flaherty) — two nominations
- Golden Globes, Anastasia (1998) — Best Original Song — Motion Picture (for "Journey to the Past" and "Once Upon a December") (with Stephen Flaherty) — two nominations
- Annie Award, Anastasia (1998) — Music in a Feature Production (with Stephen Flaherty and David Newman) — (nomination)
- Tony Award Best Original Musical Score (1998) Ragtime (winner)
- Grammy nomination — Songs from Ragtime concept album
- Grammy nomination — Ragtime Original Broadway Cast Recording
- Drama Desk Award Outstanding Lyrics (1998) Ragtime (winner)
- Grammy nomination — Seussical Original Broadway Cast Recording
- Drama Desk, Outstanding Lyrics — A Man of No Importance (2003) — (nomination)
- Outer Critics Circle Award — A Man of No Importance (2003) Best Musical, (winner)
- Drama Desk, Outstanding Musical and Outstanding Lyrics, The Glorious Ones (2008) — (nomination)
- Outer Critics Circle Award, Outstanding New Off-Broadway Musical (2008) The Glorious Ones — (nomination)
- Lucille Lortel Award, Outstanding Revival — Seussical (2008) — (nomination)

== Legacy ==
Charles Isherwood wrote of Ahrens and Flaherty: "a few composers and lyricists continue to risk irrelevance by pursuing their own lonely paths. Stephen Flaherty and Lynn Ahrens are among them. Mr. Flaherty and Ms. Ahrens, best known for their score for Ragtime, continue to see the humanist potential in the medium. They insist on writing musicals that explore the struggles of men and women, as opposed to the synthetic creatures razzle-dazzling Broadway audiences with their preening vulgarity and self-devouring jokes."
