= Stephen Flaherty =

American composer (born 1960)

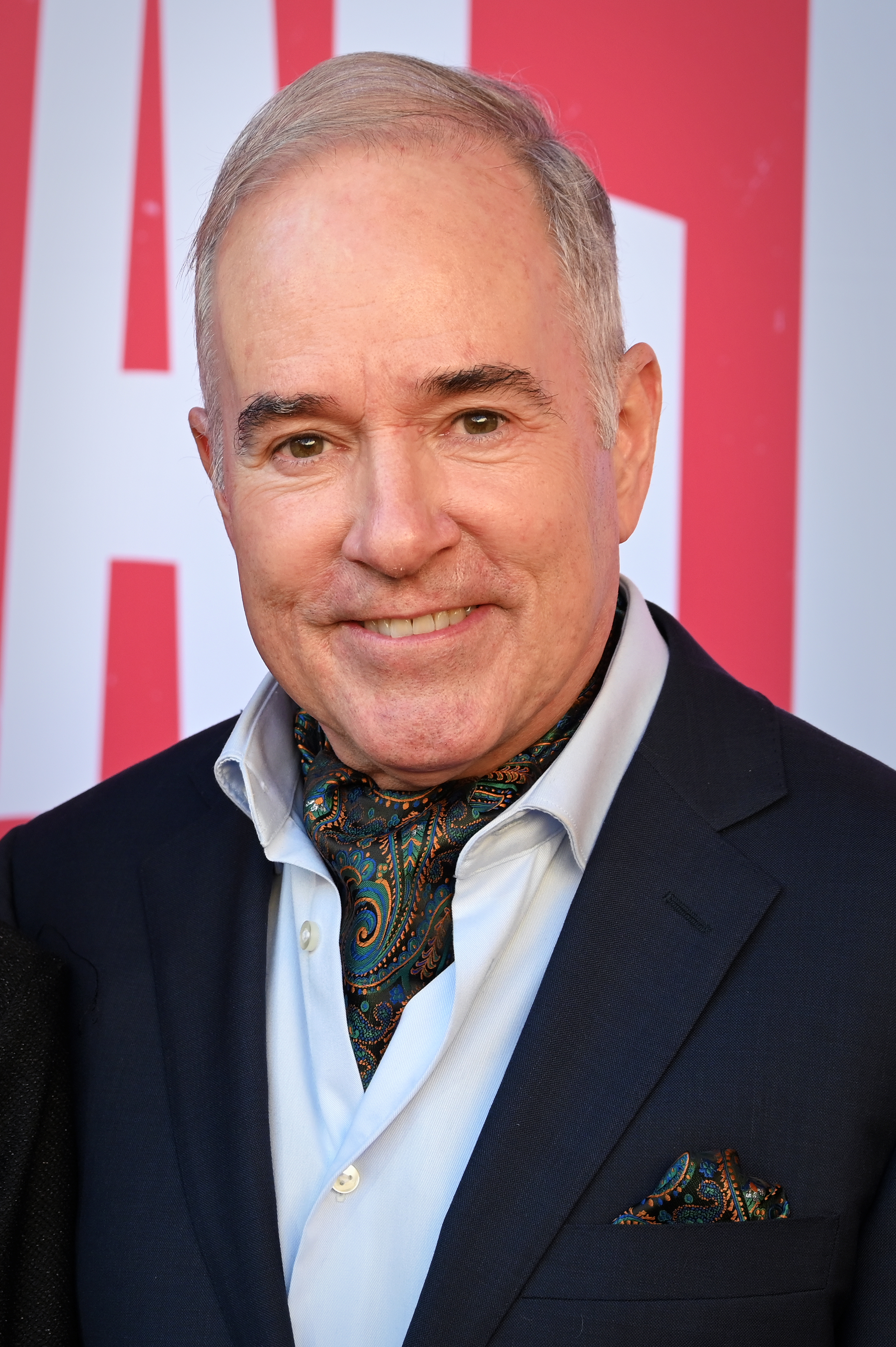
- Flaherty in 2025
- Born: September 18, 1960 (age 66); Pittsburgh, Pennsylvania, U.S.
- Education: University of Cincinnati (BM); New York University (attended)
- Occupation: Composer
- Years active: 1982–present
- Website: www.ahrensandflaherty.com

Stephen Flaherty (born September 18, 1960) is an American composer of musical theatre and film. He works most often in collaboration with the lyricist/book writer Lynn Ahrens. He is best known for writing the Broadway musicals Ragtime, which was nominated for thirty-five Tony Awards, two Grammy Awards, and won the Tony for Best Original Score; Once on This Island, which won the Tony Award for Best Revival of a Musical, the Olivier Award for London's Best Musical, and was nominated for a Grammy Award and eight Tony Awards; and Seussical, which was nominated for the Grammy Award. Flaherty was also nominated for two Academy Awards and two Golden Globe Awards (with Lynn Ahrens) for his songs and song score for the animated film musical Anastasia.

== Background ==
Flaherty was born in Pittsburgh, Pennsylvania. He began studying piano at the age of seven. When he was twelve, he knew he wanted to write musicals and by age fourteen he had already composed his first musical score. He attended South Hills Catholic High School in Pittsburgh and later studied musical composition and piano at University of Cincinnati College-Conservatory of Music, graduating in 1982. with a B.M. in Musical Composition. He did additional graduate studies in Musical Theater at New York University.

== Career ==
As a college student, Flaherty played ragtime piano in a dance band. This early job would serve Flaherty well later in life when he had the opportunity to compose the score for the Broadway musical Ragtime.

He moved to New York City in 1982 and joined the BMI Lehman Engel Musical Theater Workshop, founded by music director Lehman Engel, where he met Lynn Ahrens, who was to become his longtime collaborator. He also studied Musical Theater in the graduate program at New York University during this time. The first Ahrens and Flaherty collaboration that was produced was a one-act children's show, The Emperor's New Clothes, for TheatreWorks USA in 1985. Their next produced musical was Lucky Stiff, produced Off-Broadway in 1988 at Playwrights Horizons.

Their first Broadway musical was Once on This Island, in 1990, which transferred from Off-Broadway's Playwrights Horizons. The musical was nominated for 8 Tony Awards including Best Musical, Best Book and Best Score. The London production of the show won the Olivier Award (London's Tony) for Best Musical in 1995. The show was later revived on Broadway in an immersive production at Circle in the Square in December 2017, where it was again nominated for 8 Tony Awards, winning for Best Revival of a Musical. The cast recording of the revival was nominated for the Grammy in 2019. It was Flaherty's first Grammy nomination as a producer.

In 1992, Flaherty and Ahrens were signed by Disney to write the animated musical Song of the Sea, a coming of age story about a humpback whale. Though the film was never produced, several key development executives on the project would play a part in Flaherty and Ahrens' later film musical, Anastasia.

Also in 1992, Flaherty and Ahrens wrote the musical My Favorite Year, based on the film of the same title, with a book by Joseph Dougherty. It was notably the first original American musical to be produced by Lincoln Center Theater. Flaherty would eventually go on to write three additional original musicals for Lincoln Center Theater, all in collaboration with Ahrens: A Man of No Importance (2002, with a book by Terrence McNally), Dessa Rose (2005) and The Glorious Ones (2007). He was nominated for Outstanding Music by the Drama Desk Awards for all three of these shows.

The critically acclaimed Ragtime (also with a book by Terrence McNally) had its world premiere in Toronto in December 1996, its American premiere in Los Angeles in June 1997, and its Broadway premiere in January 1998, where it ran for two years. It won four Tony Awards, including Best Book and Best Score (for Flaherty and Ahrens), the Drama Desk Award for Best Musical and was also nominated for two Grammy Awards for its two cast recordings. Its London production (2003) was nominated for the Olivier Award for Best Musical. The show was revived on Broadway in November 2009, where it was again critically acclaimed and nominated for the Tony Award for Best Revival of a Musical.

In October 2024, Ragtime was produced as a two-week gala production at New York City Center, directed by Encores! Artistic Director Lear deBessonet, and again received rave reviews. The production was subsequently produced by Lincoln Center Theater at the Vivian Beaumont Theater, again directed by deBessonet, officially opening on October 16, 2025. The production marked the show's third appearance on Broadway and Flaherty and Ahrens' fifth show at Lincoln Center Theater. The production won 4 Tony Awards including Best Revival of a Musical. It also won 5 Drama Desk Awards, 5 Outer Critics Circle Awards, 3 Drama League Awards (all including Outstanding Revival of a Musical), and received a Special Citation from the New York Drama Critics Circle Awards. Its lead actors, Joshua Henry and Caissie Levy, both won Tony Awards as Best Actor and Best Actress in a musical. An original cast recording of the Lincoln Center production was released in January 2026 on Concord.

Following the success of Ragtime, Flaherty and Ahrens returned to Broadway in 2000 with Seussical, based on the works of Dr. Seuss, and co-conceived with Eric Idle. The original Broadway cast album was nominated for a Grammy Award, and Flaherty also received a Drama Desk nomination for Best Music. When the stock and amateur rights to the show were released following the Broadway run and its subsequent national tour, Seussical immediately became the most performed show in America. In 2008, there was a critically acclaimed off-Broadway revival directed by Marcia Milgrom Dodge, who would also go on to direct the Tony-nominated revival of Ragtime the following year.

After writing three shows for Lincoln Center Theater, Flaherty and Ahrens next returned to Broadway with the musical Rocky the Musical. The show premiered in Hamburg, Germany in October 2012. The musical has a book by Thomas Meehan and Sylvester Stallone, based on Stallone's original screenplay. Rocky premiered on Broadway at the Winter Garden Theatre, officially opening on March 13, 2014. The musical was directed by Alex Timbers, with choreography by Steven Hoggett and Kelly Devine. The show was nominated for 4 Tony Awards and 7 Drama Desk Awards including Outstanding Musical.

Flaherty and Ahrens’ next musical, Little Dancer, featured direction and choreography by Susan Stroman. Inspired by the famous sculpture, Little Dancer, Aged 14 by Edgar Degas, the musical had a reading in 2010 at Lincoln Center Theater and a developmental lab production in June 2010. The show premiered at the Kennedy Center's Eisenhower Theater in October 2014. The cast included Rebecca Luker, Boyd Gaines and Tiler Peck. The musical is inspired by true events and focuses on the relationship between a young ballerina and 19th century French painter and sculptor Edgar Degas. Much of the action is set in the Paris Opera Ballet. A re-working of the show, titled Marie, Dancing Still (after the name of the young ballerina), had its west coast premiere at Seattle's 5th Avenue Theatre in March 2019. The show, reverting to its original title, received its London premiere on July 27, 2025 in a special concert presentation at the Theatre Royal Drury Lane, with Susan Stroman again directing and choreographing, and featuring Julian Ovenden as Degas and Tiler Peck as Marie.

Flaherty's next Broadway musical was Anastasia, featuring lyrics by Ahrens, a book by Terrence McNally, and based on the 1956 and 1997 Twentieth Century Fox films. The show opened on Broadway in April 2017 at the Broadhurst Theater, after premiering at Hartford Stage in Connecticut the previous year. The show was nominated as Outstanding Musical of the season by the Drama Desk, Drama League and Outer Critics Circle Awards, and ran two years on Broadway. The show was subsequently produced internationally in Madrid, Stuttgart, The Netherlands, São Paulo, Mexico City, Tokyo, Copenhagen, Finland, Austria, Italy, Australia, and has had several US tours.

During the 2017—18 Broadway season Flaherty and Ahrens had two shows running on Broadway at the same time, Anastasia and the revival of Once on This Island.

Following Anastasia, Flaherty and Ahrens wrote the musical stage adaptation of James Agee's Pulitzer Prize-winning novel A Death in the Family and its subsequent stage adaptation, the Pulitzer Prize-winning play All the Way Home by Tad Mosel, with Ragtime director Frank Galati, who adapted the text and directed. The new musical, titled Knoxville, was originally to have had its world premiere at the Asolo Repertory Theatre in April 2020. The production was halted, however, due to the pandemic. It was finally produced two years later, in April 2022, at the Asolo. It starred Jason Danieley as the Author. Knoxville was subsequently produced by the Clarence E. Brown Theatre in Knoxville, Tennessee in September 2024, in a revised version under the direction of Josh Rhodes.

For his work in film, Flaherty was nominated for two Academy Awards with lyricist Ahrens (for Best Song and Best Score, the latter shared with David Newman) and two Golden Globe Awards for his first film, Anastasia (1997). He also composed the film score and wrote the songs for its animated sequel, Bartok the Magnificent (1999). He wrote the original film score for the documentary After the Storm (2009), which follows a group of teenagers as they perform Ahrens and Flaherty's Once On This Island in New Orleans post-Hurricane Katrina. He composed the song score and co-wrote the film score for Lucky Stiff (2014), which was based on his and Ahrens' stage musical of the same name. In 2020, he and Ahrens contributed a song to the documentary Nasrin, which was nominated for the Hollywood Music In Media Award.

Occasionally, Flaherty writes with other collaborators. His "chamber-scale musical", Loving Repeating: A Musical of Gertrude Stein, written with his Ragtime director, Frank Galati, premiered in Chicago in February 2006, in a co-production between the About Face Theatre and the Museum of Contemporary Art.^{[11]} The musical won Chicago's Joseph Jefferson Award as the “Best New Work” of the year. An earlier version of the show was initially titled A Long Gay Book, and had its premiere at Northwestern University in May 2003.^{[12]}

Flaherty collaborated with the director-choreographer Christopher Gattelli on a new "dance-theatre musical", In Your Arms, which premiered at the Old Globe Theatre (San Diego, California) on September 24, 2015. The show consists of 10 vignettes on the topic of “romantic destiny”, which were written by Douglas Carter Beane, Nilo Cruz, Christopher Durang, Carrie Fisher, David Henry Hwang, Rajiv Joseph, Terrence McNally, Marsha Norman, Lynn Nottage and Alfred Uhry, all of which were set to music by Flaherty. All the vignettes are danced without words. Lynn Ahrens wrote the lyrics for the title song. The show starred Donna McKechnie and George Chakiris and eighteen powerhouse dancers. The musical had a staged workshop during the summer of 2014 at New York Stage and Film & Vassar's Powerhouse Theater at Vassar College.

For the concert hall, Flaherty wrote the music for "With Voices Raised" (text by Lynn Ahrens, orchestration by William David Brohn), for orchestra, chorus, tenor soloist and narrators, which was commissioned by the Boston Pops Orchestra in 1999. It had its world premiere in Boston on July 4, 1999, which was nationally televised. It was subsequently released on the Pops' recording "A Splash of Pops" on the RCA Victor Label, July 13, 1999.

Other concert commissions from the Boston Pops Orchestra include "A Soldier's Carol" (2014, text by Lynn Ahrens), for orchestra, chorus and narrator, which was Flaherty's final collaboration with orchestrator William David Brohn, who won the Tony Award for his orchestrations to Ragtime; and "From Sea To Shining Sea", which premiered in Boston on June 5, 2025 (text by John de Graaff, adapted by Lynn Ahrens, orchestration by Bill Elliott), also for orchestra, chorus and narrator, commissioned in honor of Maestro Keith Lockhart's 30th anniversary with the Pops.

Additionally, Flaherty wrote the music for the "American River Suite", with lyrics by Bill Schermerhorn, which was commissioned by Macy's. The piece premiered in April 2009 at Carnegie Hall by the New York Pops and sung by Idina Menzel, Anika Noni Rose, and the children's chorus from the Choir Academy of Harlem. It was also broadcast nationally on the Fourth of July of that same year. He won several commissions from Carnegie Hall and the Guggenheim Museum, among others.

With Lynn Ahrens, Flaherty received the Oscar Hammerstein Award for Lifetime Achievement in 2014, was inducted into the American Theater Hall of Fame in 2015. He was nominated to the Songwriters Hall of Fame in 2018.

== Personal life ==
Flaherty married his longtime partner, Trevor Hardwick, on October 26, 2016, in New York City.

== Works ==
Musicals

- The Emperor's New Clothes (1985)
- Lucky Stiff (1988)
- Once on This Island (1990; Broadway revival 2017)
- My Favorite Year (1992)
- Ragtime (1998; Broadway revivals 2009, 2025)
- Seussical (2000; revival 2007)
- A Man of No Importance (2002)
- A Long Gay Book (2003), an early version of Loving Repeating
- Dessa Rose (2005)
- Loving Repeating (2006)
- Chita Rivera: The Dancer's Life (2005), music also by others
- The Glorious Ones (2007)
- Rocky the Musical (2012)
- Little Dancer (musical) (2014)
- In Your Arms (2015)
- Anastasia (2016), stage version of the 20th Century Fox animated film
- Knoxville (2022)

Incidental music

- Proposals (1997)

Contributions

- "I Eat", contribution to The Seven Deadly Sins: A Song Cycle for Audra McDonald, performed at Carnegie Hall's Zankel Hall on June 2, 2004

Film scores

- Anastasia (1997)
- Buster & Chauncey's Silent Night (songs - 1998)
- Bartok the Magnificent (1999)
- After the Storm (2009)
- Lucky Stiff (2014)

== Awards and nominations ==
List of awards and nominations
| Year | Award | Category | Result | Title |
|---|---|---|---|---|
| 1991 | Tony Award | Best Original Score | Nominated | Once on This Island |
| 1995 | Olivier Award | Best New Musical | Won | Once on This Island |
| 1998 | Academy Award | Best Original Song | Nominated | Anastasia |
| 1998 | Academy Award | Best Original Musical or Comedy Score | Nominated | Anastasia |
| 1998 | Golden Globe Award | Best Original Song | Nominated | Anastasia |
| 1998 | Annie Award | Music in a Feature Production | Nominated | Anastasia |
| 1998 | Drama Desk Award | Outstanding Music | Won | Ragtime |
| 1998 | Tony Award | Best Original Score | Won | Ragtime |
| 1998 | Grammy Award | Best Musical Theater Album | Nominated | Songs from Ragtime: The Musical (Studio cast) |
| 1999 | Grammy Award | Best Musical Theater Album | Nominated | Ragtime (Original Broadway Cast Recording) |
| 2001 | Grammy Award | Best Musical Theater Album | Nominated | Seussical |
| 2001 | Drama Desk Award | Outstanding Music | Nominated | Seussical |
| 2003 | Drama Desk Award | Outstanding Music | Nominated | A Man of No Importance |
| 2003 | Outer Critics Circle Award | Outstanding Off Broadway Musical | Won | A Man of No Importance |
| 2004 | Olivier Award | Best New Musical | Nominated | Ragtime |
| 2005 | Drama Desk Award | Outstanding Music | Nominated | Dessa Rose |
| 2005 | Joseph Jefferson Award | Best New Musical | Won | Loving Repeating: A Musical of Gertrude Stein |
| 2008 | Drama Desk Award | Outstanding Music | Nominated | The Glorious Ones |
| 2008 | Outer Critics Circle Award | Outstanding New Off-Broadway Musical | Nominated | The Glorious Ones |
| 2008 | Lucille Lortel Award | Outstanding Revival | Nominated | Seussical |
| 2010 | Tony Award | Best Revival of a Musical | Nominated | Ragtime |
| 2015 | Theater Hall of Fame | Inductee | Won | Lifetime achievement |
| 2017 | Drama Desk Award | Outstanding Music | Nominated | Anastasia |
| 2018 | Tony Award | Best Revival of a Musical | Won | Once on This Island |
| 2018 | Songwriters Hall of Fame | Honoree | Nominated | Lifetime achievement |
| 2019 | Grammy Award | Best Musical Theater Album (New Broadway Cast) | Nominated | Once on This Island |
| 2020 | Hollywood Music In Media Award | Best Song (Documentary) | Nominated | Nasrin |
| 2025 | American Songbook Association | Honoree | Won | Lifetime achievement |
