= Jason Danieley =

American actor (born 1971)

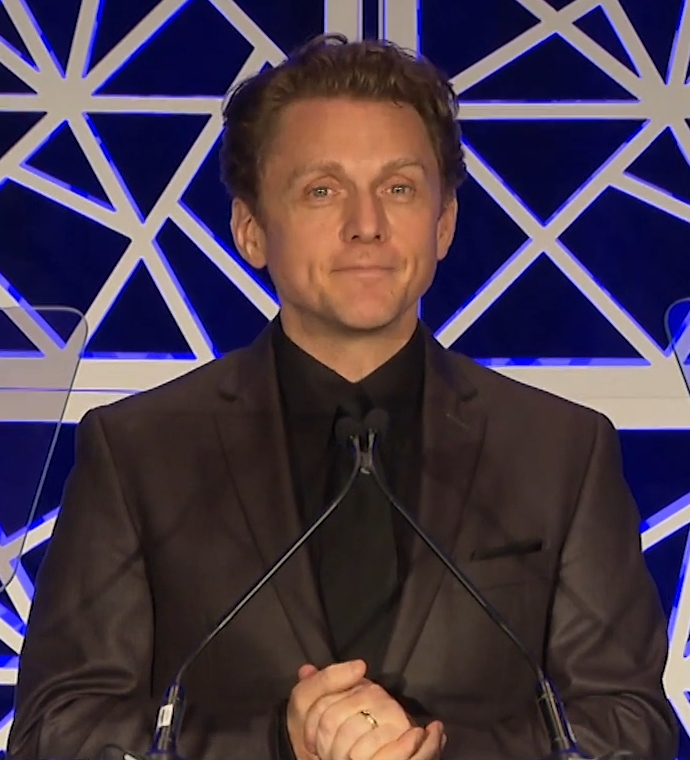
- Jason Danieley in June 2019
- Born: July 13, 1971 (age 54); St. Louis, Missouri, US
- Occupations: Actor, singer
- Years active: 1993–present
- Spouse(s): Marin Mazzie (m. 1997; died 2018) Andrea Nunes (m. 2024)
- Website: Official website

Jason D. Danieley (born July 13, 1971) is an American actor, singer, concert performer and recording artist. He was born in St. Louis, Missouri, and was married to fellow performer Marin Mazzie.

== Career ==
Ben Brantley, in a review of Curtains in The New York Times, said Danieley had "the most exquisite tenor on Broadway". After classical voice training at the University of Missouri and Southern Illinois University, Danieley left without graduating and, at the age of 25, made his Broadway debut in the Harold Prince-directed revival of Candide, as the title character. Prince was quoted in The New York Times as saying, "It's unusual in the world of musical theater to find someone who can sing as well as he can act. Mark my words: Jason has an extraordinary future ahead of him."

Danieley appeared Off-Broadway in the musical Hit The Lights! in 1993, but gained recognition in 1996 in Floyd Collins, based on the tragedy of caver Floyd Collins, written by Richard Rodgers’s grandson, Adam Guettel. The musical has a mixture of Appalachian and classical music; Ben Brantley in The New York Times noted that Danieley (with others) was "especially winning".

Danieley starred in the musical The Full Monty, which premiered at the Old Globe Theatre, San Diego, California in June to July 2000. The musical opened on Broadway in October 2000. He appeared in the John Kander and Fred Ebb musical Curtains on Broadway in 2007. Composer John Kander wrote the song "I Miss the Music" specifically for the character that Danieley played in Curtains.

He played Lt. Joseph Cable, in the Emmy nominated concert version of South Pacific, performed at Carnegie Hall in June 2005. The concert was filmed and aired on PBS' Great Performances. He has appeared in London's West End.

Danieley joined Next to Normal on Broadway, replacing Brian d'Arcy James in the role of Dan on July 19, 2010, opposite his wife, Marin Mazzie, who replaced Alice Ripley as Diana. This made them a real-life couple portraying an onstage fictional married couple.

He appeared in the New York City Center Encores! staged concert of Allegro in March 1994 and A Tree Grows in Brooklyn in February 2005.

He appeared in the Williamstown Theatre Festival (Massachusetts) production of The Visit in July and August 2014, and again in 2015, when it transferred to Broadway. He appeared in the Paper Mill Playhouse (Millburn, New Jersey) production of Can-Can as "Aristide" in October 2014.

Danieley portrayed Billy Flynn in the Broadway cast of Chicago in 2015 and 2016. He appeared in the musical Pretty Woman in Chicago and on Broadway in 2018–2019.

In 2022, Danieley starred as James Agee in the world premiere of Knoxville, a new musical written by Frank Galati with music by Stephen Flaherty and lyrics by Lynn Ahrens.

=== Concerts and recording ===
Danieley's career on and Off-Broadway combined with his classical background led to a natural crossover into singing with most of the country's leading symphonies and pops orchestras. A frequent guest artist with Boston, Philadelphia and New York Pops and The San Francisco Symphony he has also appeared with the Los Angeles Philharmonic (at the Hollywood Bowl), St. Louis, Utah, Minnesota and Buffalo Symphonies. Additionally, Danieley and Mazzie appear at smaller venues, such as the Café Carlyle in New York in 2011.

Danieley met his wife, Marin Mazzie, in 1996 in an Off-Broadway play that they performed together titled Trojan Women: A Love Story. Danieley and Mazzie recorded their first album Opposite You on PS Classics, which was released in 2005. Variety in 2002 wrote: "When they sing, the heart seems to beat a little faster... emotional strength to envelop the listener and melt the heart... This is one savvy pair..." The sfgate.com called them "Broadway's golden couple" in 2002.

Danieley launched his solo recording career with the self-titled album Jason Danieley & The Frontier Heroes, combining Americana music from the Great American Songbook and Broadway repertoire. The recording was produced by PS Classics and released in 2008. His other recordings include the cast albums of Curtains, Floyd Collins, Candide, The Full Monty, Dream True, Secondhand Lions, the compilation CDs of Jule Styne in Hollywood, The Stephen Schwartz Album and two Boston Pops albums, A Splash of Pops and My Favorite Things.

In 2017, Danieley recorded the album "Broadway and Beyond" with Marin Mazzie at 54 Below. The album was released in 2019, after Mazzie's death.

== Personal life ==
Jason Danieley was born in St. Louis to Larry and Carole Danieley. He was married to actress Marin Mazzie from October 19, 1997, until her death on September 13, 2018.

== Awards ==
- 1997: Drama Desk Award nomination for Outstanding Actor in a Musical, Candide
- 1997: Drama League Award, Candide
- 1997: Theatre World Award, Candide
- 2005: Backstage West Award, Honorable Mention, 110 In The Shade
- 2005: Helen Hayes Award for Outstanding Lead Actor, Resident Musical, The Highest Yellow (Signature Theatre, Arlington, Virginia)
- 2007: Outer Critics Circle Award nomination for Outstanding Featured Actor in a Musical, Curtains
