= All the Way Home (play) =

1960 play by Tad Mosel

- Original language: English
- Written by: Tad Mosel
- Genre: Drama
- Setting: In and around Knoxville, Tennessee. May 1915.

Premiere
- Date: November 30, 1960; 65 years ago
- Place: Belasco Theatre

All the Way Home is a play written by the American playwright Tad Mosel, adapted from the 1957 James Agee novel A Death in the Family. Each author received the Pulitzer Prize for their separate works.

== Productions ==
All the Way Home was premiered on Broadway at the Belasco Theater on November 30, 1960, and closed on September 15, 1961, after 333 performances. Directed by Arthur Penn, the cast featured Colleen Dewhurst (Mary Follet), Lillian Gish (Catherine Lynch), Arthur Hill (Jay Follet), Clifton James (Ralph Follet), Dorrit Kelton (Aunt Sadie Follet), Aline MacMahon (Aunt Hannah Lynch), John Megna (Rufus) and Jeff Conaway (a Boy).

The play was revived Off-Broadway at the Equity Library Theatre in October 1979, directed by Jamie Brown.

The play was revived off-off-Broadway by the Transport Group in November 2006. Directed by Jack Cummings III, the cast featured Patrick Boll (Jay Follett), Monica Russell (Mary) and Chandler Frantz (Rufus). The TheaterMania reviewer wrote, "The achingly moving play is Tad Mosel's 1960 Pulitzer Prize-winning adaptation of James Agee's autobiographical 1957 Pulitzer Prize-winning novel 'A Death in the Family', and in reviving the piece, director Jack Cummings III confirms that both prizes are deserved."

== Plot ==
The play takes place in summer 1915 in Knoxville, Tennessee, where the extended families of the Folletts and the Lynches live. Jay Follet and his pregnant wife Mary have a six-year-old son named Rufus, who takes great joy in being with his father. Jay's brother, Ralph, is an undertaker. Ralph appears to have a drinking problem and mistreats his wife Sally. Mary's parents are Joel Lynch and Catherine Lynch, and her brother is Andrew. The play unfolds over a period of four days.

During the first act, the Folletts leave Jay and Mary's home to visit their 104-year-old great-great-grandmother and Aunt Sadie Follet. Returning later that evening, Jay receives a frantic call from his brother Ralph that their father Jim-Wilson is in declining health. After Mary warns Jay about driving too fast, Jay leaves to find out what happened.

In the second act, it is revealed that Jay is killed in an automobile accident. The remainder of the play deals with the family coming to terms with his death. It becomes uncertain if Jay had been driving drunk or if it had been a suicide.

The third act takes place on the day of Jay's funeral. Mary tells Rufus, for the first time, that she is pregnant and that he may have a little brother or sister on the way.

== Film and television ==
The play was made into a film, directed by Alex Segal and starring Jean Simmons (Mary Follett), Robert Preston (Jay Follett), Pat Hingle (Ralph Follet), Aline MacMahon (Aunt Hannah), Thomas Chalmers (Joel Lynch), John Cullum (Andrew) and Michael Kearney (Rufus Follett). The screenplay was by Philip Reisman Jr. It was released in 1963.

A television movie was broadcast in December 1971 in a Hallmark Hall of Fame presentation. Directed by Fred Coe, the cast starred Joanne Woodward (Mary), Richard Kiley (Jay) and Pat Hingle (Ralph).

A live presentation of the play was broadcast on NBC on December 21, 1981. Directed by Delbert Mann, the cast featured Sally Field (Mary), William Hurt (Jay), Ned Beatty (Ralph), Ellen Corby (Great-Gandmaw), Betty Garrett (Catherine), Murray Hamilton (Joel Lynch), Polly Holliday (Aunt Hannah) and Jeremy Licht (Rufus). This was a stage production broadcast live from the Bing Theatre at the USC School of Dramatic Arts.

== Awards and nominations ==
Tony Award

- 1961 Featured Actress in a Play (Colleen Dewhurst), winner
- 1961 Costume Design of a Play (Raymond Sovey), nominee
- 1961 Direction of a Play (Arthur Penn), nominee
- 1961 Play, nominee
- 1961 Scenic Design of a Play, (David Hays) nominee

New York Drama Critics' Circle

- 1961 Best American Play (Tad Mosel), winner

1961 Pulitzer Prize for Drama
