= Bare: A Pop Opera =

Rock musical, premiered 2000

Bare
- A Pop Opera
- Off-Broadway promotional poster
- Music: Damon Intrabartolo
- Lyrics: Jon Hartmere
- Book: Jon Hartmere; Damon Intrabartolo
- Premiere: October 14, 2000: Hudson Theatre, Los Angeles
- Productions: 2000 Los Angeles; 2004 Off-Broadway; 2008 Houston; 2008 Seattle; 2008 Indianapolis; 2009 Denver; 2009 Toronto; 2010 Sydney; 2011 Minneapolis; 2011 St. Louis; 2011 Albany; 2012 Manila; 2012 Liverpool; 2012 Belgium; 2013 Los Angeles revival 2013 Off-West End; 2014 Tokyo; 2014 Barcelona; 2014 Youngstown; 2014 San Diego; 2015 Seoul; 2015 Medicine Hat; 2016 Buenos Aires; 2016 Tokyo revival 2016 Seoul revival 2016 Chicago; 2016 Sydney; 2017 Seoul revival 2017 Brighton; 2018 Amsterdam; 2018 Melbourne; 2018 Brisbane; 2018 Reno; 2018 São Paulo; 2019 London; 2019 Wellington; 2019 New York; 2019 Hawaii; 2019 Michigan; 2020 Tokyo revival 2020 Seoul revival 2022 Seoul revival 2024 London Staged Concert; 2024 Seoul revival 2025 Seoul revival 2025 Los Angeles revival

Bare, also known as Bare: A Pop Opera, is a coming-of-age sung-through musical with music by Damon Intrabartolo, lyrics by Jon Hartmere, and a book by Hartmere and Intrabartolo. The story focuses on a group of high school students and their struggles at their private Catholic boarding school.

The musical was later revised as Bare: The Musical.

== Productions ==
The musical debuted at the Hudson Theatre in Los Angeles, running from October 14, 2000 to February 25, 2001. The New York production of Bare at the American Theatre of Actors Off-Broadway, ran from April 19 to May 27, 2004. The Los Angeles and New York productions were both directed by Kristin Hanggi.

Bare had its Canadian premiere in summer 2009 at the Hart House Theatre, Toronto, directed by Bri Waters. Bare had its Sydney premiere in September 2010 at the New Theatre, as part of the Sydney Fringe Festival.

A new production of the original version has been produced again in Los Angeles, this time at the Hayworth Theatre. It opened on September 6, 2013, produced by Topher Rhys and Jamie Lee Barnard for glory|struck Productions, directed by Calvin Remsberg, choreographed by Jen Oundjian with musical direction by Elmo Zapp.

On July 6, 2017, Bare made its premiere in Brighton, an established LGBTQ destination nicknamed the "unofficial gay capital of the UK". Produced by Brief Hiatus, this production was directed by Conor Baum with choreography by Sarah-Leanne Humphreys, receiving critical acclaim.

== Synopsis ==
=== Act I ===
At St. Cecilia's Boarding School, Peter dozes off during Mass and has a nightmare in which he is outed as gay and condemned by everyone ("Epiphany"). After Mass, he sees Jason, his roommate and secret lover. Jason reassures Peter about their relationship and Peter suggests that they audition for the school play ("You & I"). Alone, Peter reflects on his anxieties about his relationship with Jason ("Role of a Lifetime"). Jason shows up to the auditions for Romeo and Juliet at the last minute and competes with another student, Matt, for the part of Romeo. Drama teacher Sister Chantelle casts Jason as Romeo and Ivy as Juliet ("Auditions"). Nadia, Jason's overweight twin sister, is upset that she was cast as the Nurse and commiserates with Jason over their overbearing parents ("Plain Jane Fat Ass").

Matt tries to plan a small surprise birthday party for Ivy, with whom he is in love. Lucas, the school's party boy, organizes a trip to a rave, bringing ecstasy and other drugs ("Wonderland"). Insecure about her appearance, Nadia decides to stay behind ("A Quiet Night at Home"). At the rave, Peter dances with Jason and Ivy with Matt ("Rolling"). Peter tries to kiss Jason, who leads him outside. Peter wants to make their relationship public but Jason is afraid ("Best Kept Secret"). They kiss, but unbeknownst to them, Matt sees them together. The next morning, at Confession, Matt and Peter ask for guidance about their respective secrets: Matt about seeing the kiss and Peter about being gay ("Confession").

After Nadia jokes about Ivy's promiscuity, Ivy reflects on the way her reputation defines and confines her ("Portrait of a Girl"). Nadia turns Ivy's birthday party into a crude and uproarious event ("Birthday, Bitch!"). Peter unknowingly eats pot brownies and flirts with Jason. A drunk Ivy does the same and Jason chooses her over Peter to save face. Ivy asks Jason to kiss her as a birthday gift and he reluctantly agrees ("One Kiss"). Matt and Peter bond over their frustrations and an inebriated Peter tells Matt the secret of his relationship with Jason ("Are You There?"). Peter later has a vision of the Virgin Mary, in the form of Sister Chantelle, telling him that he needs to come out to his mother ("911! Emergency!").

At rehearsal, Matt abandons the script and tackles Jason, calling him a homophobic slur ("Reputation Stain'd"). Peter asks Jason to come home with him for spring break and help him come out to his mother. Jason panics, afraid of his father finding out, and breaks up with Peter ("Ever After"). While Nadia sardonically sings about her dislike of spring, Peter leaves for break without speaking to Jason ("Spring"). Ivy apologizes to Jason for her actions at the party, but admits that she likes him and hopes for more. While Peter and Matt pine for their respective loves and Nadia wishes to be noticed, Jason sleeps with Ivy, hoping it is the right thing to do ("One").

=== Act II ===
The school chapel is decorated elaborately for Peter and Jason's wedding. The scene turns into Jason's wedding to Ivy and reveals itself to be Peter's nightmare ("Wedding Bells"). Later, class ranks are posted and Jason has achieved the valedictorian spot, once again besting Matt ("In the Hallway"). Ivy tells Jason that though she has been with other boys before, he is her first true love. After realizing that Ivy's feelings are the way he feels about Peter, he breaks up with her ("Touch My Soul"). Peter calls his mother Claire, intending to come out. She continually evades the subject, though he suspects she already knows the truth ("See Me"). Claire hangs up, shaken at the confirmation of her fears, but eventually recognizes that her love for him is stronger than her religious objections ("Warning").

When Ivy misses rehearsal, her understudy Diane steps in but forgets her lines. Peter temporarily takes over and dances with Jason ("Pilgrim's Hands"). Ivy appears at the end of the rehearsal and insists to Jason that they need to speak privately. Sister Chantelle tells Peter that she knows what has been bothering him—that he is gay—and assures him that he is just as God wanted him to be ("God Don't Make No Trash"). Ivy tells Nadia that she is pregnant with Jason's child ("All Grown Up"). She later finds Jason practicing his graduation speech and tells him that she is pregnant and still hopes he might learn to love her back. Matt, who has overheard them, reveals that Jason is in love with Peter. Peter arrives and he, Matt, and Jason exchange heated words as the other students look on ("Promise").

Distraught, Jason reflects on his relationship with Peter, and how even through his fear, he knows that it is the only thing that will comfort him ("Once Upon a Time"). With nowhere else to go, he asks the priest at Confession if God still loves him and can forgive him. The priest tells him that he must deny his feelings ("Cross"). Backstage before the play, Lucas passes out drug orders to students, including Jason. Jason asks Peter to run away with him but Peter refuses, not wanting to hide anymore ("Two Households"). Jason, thinking that he has lost Peter for good, takes a large dose of GHB.

As the play begins, he again pulls Peter aside and tells him that he has loved him since they first met. Peter tells him he loves him too and reassures him that their parting is not a permanent goodbye ("Bare"). As Peter delivers the Queen Mab speech, Jason becomes increasingly disoriented and begins to hallucinate ("Queen Mab"). During the masked ball scene, he collapses and dies in Peter's arms ("A Glooming Peace"). Peter confronts the priest about Jason's last visit, accusing him of failing to show compassion ("Absolution"). At graduation, Peter, Ivy, Matt, and Nadia wonder whether they could have prevented Jason's death and consider the role they played in it. They move forward into a world that will yield more questions than answers ("No Voice").

== Characters and original casts ==
Character(s)	Los Angeles (2000)	Off-Broadway (2004)	Studio Recording (2007)	Los Angeles Revival (2013)	West End Staged Concert (2024)
Peter Simonds	John Torres	Michael Arden	Matt Doyle	Payson Lewis	Laurie Kynaston
Jason McConnell	John Griffin	John Hill	James Snyder	Jonah Platt	Jordan Luke Gage
Ivy Robinson	Jenna Leigh Green	Jenna Leigh Green	Jenna Leigh Green	Lindsay Pearce	Frances Mayli McCann
Nadia McConnell	Keili Lefkovitz	Natalie Joy Johnson	Keili Lefkovitz	Katie Stevens	Katie Ramshaw
Matt Lloyd	Wallace Smith	Aaron Lohr	Christopher Johnson	Nathan Parrett	Ed Larkin
Sister Chantelle/Virgin Mary	Stephanie Andersen	Romelda T. Benjamin	Stephanie Andersen	Stephanie Andersen	Claudia Kariuki
Claire	Maura M. Knowles	Kaitlin Hopkins	Kaitlin Hopkins	Alissa-Nicole Koblentz	Cassidy Janson
Priest	Mark Edgar Stephens	Jim Price	Jim Price	John Griffin	Adrian Hansel
Lucas Carter	Philip Dean Lightstone	Adam Fleming	Jason Ryterband	Casey Hayden	Jason Battersby
Tanya Garrett/Cherub	Charity Hill	Sasha Allen	Judith Hill	Caitlin Ary	Aoife Kenny
Kyra/Cherub (named Brittany in 2000 Los Angeles production)	Tassa Hampton	Kearran Giovanni	Carmel Echols	Katherine Washington	Chrissie Bhima
Diane Lee	Jennie Kwan	Kay Trinidad	Kara Maguire	Reesa Ishiyama	Emily Ooi
Zack	Reed Prescott	Mike Cannon	Nils Montan	Christopher Higgins	Jack Ofrecio
Rory	—N/a	Lindsay Scott	Anna Rose	Kelsey Hainlen	Clodagh Greene
Alan	—N/a	Isaac Calpito	Joel Echols	Harrison Meloeny	Samuel Joseph Howes

== Musical numbers ==
Act I

- "Epiphany" — Company
- "You & I" — Jason, Peter, and Students
- "Role of a Lifetime" — Peter
- "Auditions" — Chantelle and Students
- "Plain Jane Fat Ass"† — Nadia and Jason
- "Wonderland" — Matt, Nadia, Tanya, Lucas, Ivy, Peter, and Jason
- "A Quiet Night at Home" — Nadia
- "Rolling" — Band
- "Best Kept Secret" — Jason and Peter
- "Confession" — Priest and Students
- "Portrait of a Girl" — Ivy and Matt
- "Birthday, Bitch!" — Students
- "One Kiss" — Ivy and Jason
- "Are You There?" — Matt and Peter
- "911! Emergency!"‡ — Mary and Cherubs
- "Reputation Stain'd" — Ivy, Jason, Peter, Matt, and Nadia
- "Ever After" — Peter and Jason
- "Spring" — Nadia
- "One" — Ivy, Jason, Nadia, Matt, and Peter

Act II

- "Wedding Bells" — Company
- "In The Hallway" — Band
- "Touch My Soul" — Ivy and Jason
- "See Me" — Peter and Claire
- "Warning" — Claire
- "Pilgrims' Hands" — Jason and Peter
- "God Don't Make No Trash" — Chantelle
- "All Grown Up" — Ivy
- "Promise" — Jason, Ivy, Matt, Nadia, and Peter
- "Once Upon a Time" — Jason
- "Cross" — Jason and Priest
- "Two Households" — Students
- "Bare" — Jason and Peter
- "Queen Mab" — Jason and Peter
- "A Glooming Peace" — Students
- "Absolution" — Peter and Priest
- "No Voice" — Company

† Cut from the 2004 Off-Broadway production and replaced with "Love, Dad"

‡ Replaced "Mother Love" from the 2000 Los Angeles production

== Album ==
An 11-song CD sampler featuring the 2004 New York cast was offered to every ticket buyer during the final performances of the Off-Broadway run. The full studio album from Bare, produced by Deborah Lurie and Casey Stone, was released on October 30, 2007, as a three-disc CD + DVD set. The 2012–2013 production was announced to be releasing a cast album. This, however, did not occur due to the quick closing of the revival amid poor reviews and public response.

== Planned film adaptation ==
On January 2, 2018, it was announced that Bare would be made into a motion picture, directed by Kristin Hanggi and produced by Hillary Butorac Weaver and Janet Billig Rich. Hanggi will adapt the screenplay for the film. No release date has been set.
