= Andy Mientus =

American actor

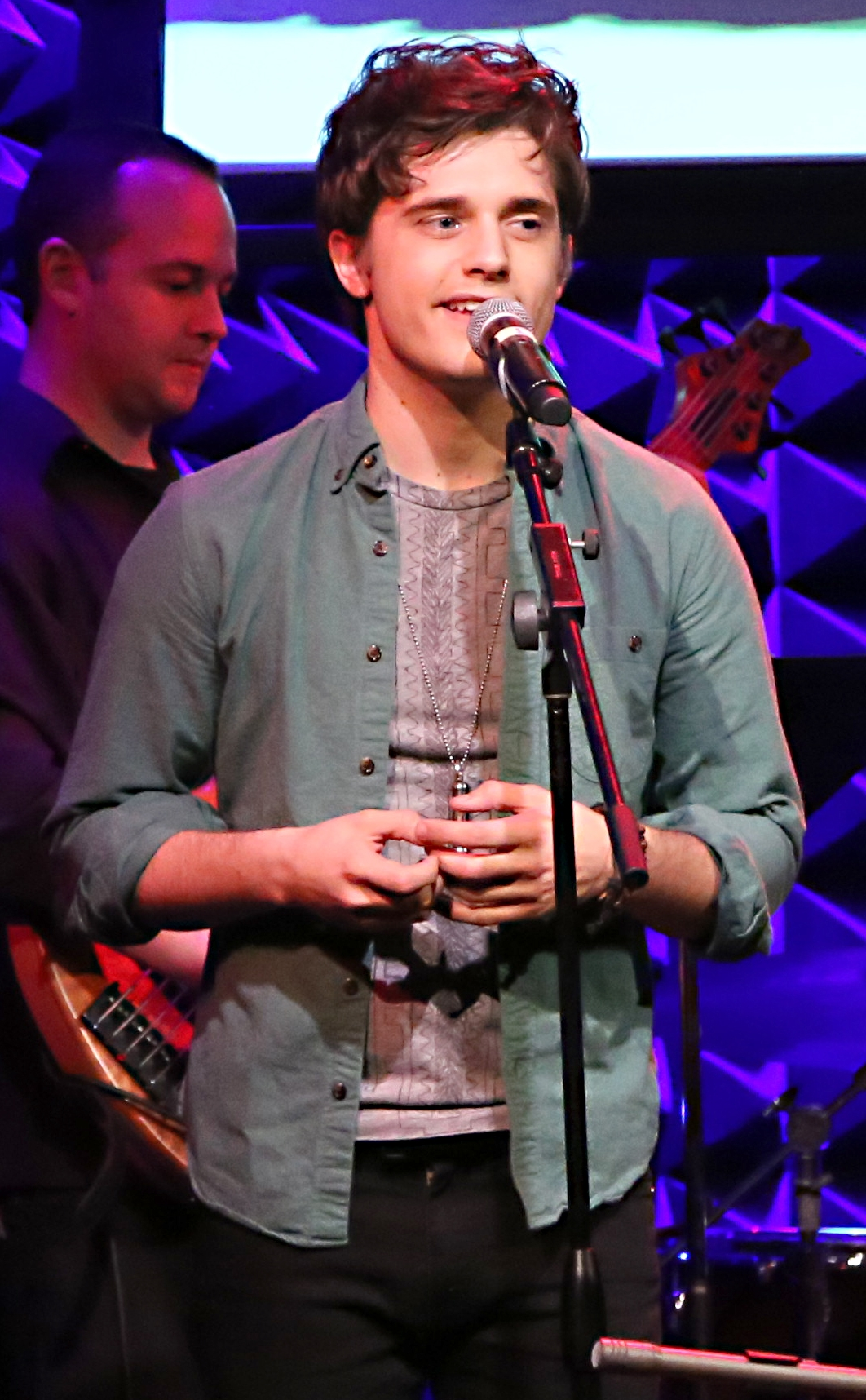
- Mientus on the It Gets Better Project Holiday Show in 2014
- Born: Andrew Michael Mientus; November 10, 1986 (age 40); Pittsburgh, Pennsylvania, U.S.
- Education: University of Michigan
- Occupations: Actor; singer
- Years active: 2008–present
- Spouse: Michael Arden (m. 2016)

Andrew Michael Mientus (born November 10, 1986) is an American actor. He is best known for starring in the Broadway musicals Spring Awakening, Les Misérables, and Wicked, and on television in the NBC musical drama Smash and as Hartley Rathaway / Pied Piper in the CW series The Flash.

== Early life ==
Mientus was born in Pittsburgh, Pennsylvania, son of Jean Marie (née Gleeson) and Robert J. Mientus. He is of Polish, Italian, and Irish descent. Before starting his career in theatre, Mientus was a fan of the musical Spring Awakening. After seeing the show at the Atlantic Theatre Company, he created a Facebook group for his friends and himself to discuss the show on. However, Mientus began to notice strangers (fellow fans) were joining the group, and soon one of the producers from Spring Awakening contacted Mientus and asked him to make his group the official show Facebook page, which Mientus could moderate. He agreed, and was later recommended by the same producer to audition for the touring company of Spring Awakening. He left the University of Michigan after his junior year to be in the show, and never returned to graduate.

== Career ==
=== Theater ===
Mientus has toured with the first national touring company of Spring Awakening as Hanschen and in the 2010/11 international tour of Academy and appeared in the 2012 Off-Broadway revival of Carrie: The Musical. He made his Broadway debut in the 2014 revival of Les Misérables as Marius Pontmercy.

In February 2015, he was cast as journalist Brett Craig in Parade, for a one-night-only concert presentation at the Lincoln Center's Avery Fisher Hall. After finishing his run of Les Misérables in early 2015 and being succeeded by Chris McCarrell, Mientus moved to Los Angeles with fiancé Michael Arden, where he appeared in the show Bent at the Mark Taper Forum. He also reprised his role as Hänschen in the Deaf West production of Spring Awakening, directed by Arden. The production then transferred to Broadway, and closed on January 24, 2016.

In April and May 2018, Mientus starred in the production of The Who's Tommy at the Denver Center for the Performing Arts as the title role. In an interview, Mientus stated that the classic rock score was among the music he grew up with rather than musical theater music, so he was very comfortable with the material vocally.

=== Television ===
In 2013, Mientus was cast in season two of the musical drama television series Smash as series regular Kyle Bishop. Following the cancellation of Smash, Mientus and co-stars Jeremy Jordan and Krysta Rodriguez joined the cast of Hit List, the real-world staging of the fictional rock musical created for season two of Smash. The show ran for three performances on December 8–9 at 54 Below.

In 2014, Mientus appeared in several episodes of the ABC Family series Chasing Life as Jackson. That same year, he was cast in a recurring role on the CW series The Flash as the Pied Piper (Hartley Rathaway), having previously auditioned for the lead role of Barry Allen. Mientus made history with this role by playing the first openly gay supervillain ever.

In 2017 he was cast as a series regular opposite Leven Rambin, Danny Pino and Chris Noth in Gone, a 12-episode procedural drama series for NBCUniversal International Studios, Germany's RTL and France's TF1, based on Chelsea Cain's novel One Kick. Mientus' character James Finley is a skilled hacker, who was kicked out of his home as a teenager when his family discovered he was gay. While living on the street he was abducted and later rescued by FBI Agent Frank Novak played by Chris Noth.

In 2021 Mientus was cast in Grendel, an eight-episode Netflix series based on Matt Wagner's Dark Horse comic books. Mientus will play the role of Larry Stohler with Abubakr Ali as the lead, Grendel/Hunter Rose. The series air date is scheduled late 2022 to early 2023.

=== Writing ===
Mientus worked on a musical of his own with the Brooklyn-based band Teen Commandments (members Van Hughes, Nick LaGrasta, and Brett Moses). Songs from Burn All Night were performed for the first time at Feinstein's/54 Below in the Hell's Kitchen neighborhood of Midtown Manhattan in August 2016. The official premiere of the musical directed by Jenny Koons and choreographed by Sam Pinkleton was on August 18, 2017, at the American Repertory Theater in Cambridge, Massachusetts.

On March 9, 2018 Amulet Books, an imprint of Abrams, announced that Mientus has written a middle-grade fiction series called The Backstagers, based on the comics series of the same name. The first installment, The Backstagers and the Ghost Light, was published on September 25, 2018. On September 20, 2022, he released the queer young-adult paranormal novel Fraternity.

== Personal life ==
Mientus has a rare neurological disorder called HNPP (Hereditary Neuropathy with Pressure Palsies). During his freshman ballet class at the University of Michigan, his foot went numb and he had to pull out of the class for the remainder of the year. He was then put in a stage tech class, where he met fellow actor Darren Criss.

Mientus is openly bisexual. He married actor and director Michael Arden on August 18, 2016, at Babington House, Somerset, England. He and Arden planned proposals to each other the same day (June 23, 2014), without the other knowing. They have been together since November 14, 2010. The two first met on October 26, 2006, during the opening night party of the Broadway show The Times They Are-a-Changin', in which Arden was a performer.

== Theatre ==
Year	Production	Role	Location	Category
2008–10	Spring Awakening	Hänschen Rilow	—N/a	National Tour
2010	Shine!	Richard Hunter (Ragged Dick)	New York Musical Theatre Festival	New York Musical Theatre Festival
2010–11	Academy	Conrad Lansky	York Theatre Company	International Tour
2011	Rent	Mark Cohen	Pioneer Theatre Company	Salt Lake City Production
2011	Crazy, Just Like Me	Simon Sharp	New York Musical Theatre Festival	New York Musical Theatre Festival
2011	February House	Chester Kallman	New York Stage and Film	Off-Broadway
2012	Carrie	Stokes/cover Billy Nolan	Lucille Lortel Theatre	Off-Broadway
2014–15	Les Misérables	Marius Pontmercy	Imperial Theatre	Broadway
2015	Parade	Britt Craig	Lincoln Center	Concert
2015	Spring Awakening	Hänschen Rilow	Wallis Annenberg Center	Los Angeles – Deaf West Theatre
2015	Bent	Rudy	Mark Taper Forum	Los Angeles
2015	Gross Indecency: The Three Trials of Oscar Wilde	Sidney Mavor, William Parker	Gerald W. Lynch Theater	Benefit Reading
2015–16	Spring Awakening	Hänschen Rilow	Brooks Atkinson Theatre	Broadway – Deaf West Theatre Transfer
2016	Ragtime	Younger Brother	Ellis Island	Concert
2016–17	Wicked	Boq	—N/a	National Tour
2018	The Who's Tommy	Tommy Walker	Denver Center for the Performing Arts	Regional Production
2018	Tarrytown	Ichabod Crane	MCC Theater	Reading
2019	The View UpStairs	Patrick	Soho Theatre	London
2023	tick, tick... BOOM!	Jon	Bucks County Playhouse	Regional Production
2023	Emmet Otter's Jug-Band Christmas	Emmet Otter	Studebaker Theater	Regional Production
2024	tick, tick... BOOM!	Jon	The Cape Playhouse	Regional Production - Remount
2025	The Jonathan Larson Project	Performer	Orpheum Theatre	Off-Broadway
2025	Tarrytown	Ichabod Crane	Tarrytown Music Hall	Concert

== Filmography ==
Television & Film
Year	Title	Role	Notes
2013	It Could Be Worse	Andy	Episode: "Congratulations, Jacob"
2013	Smash	Kyle Bishop	Main role; 14 episodes
2013	Anger Management	Andy	2 episodes
2014	Chasing Life	Jackson	4 episodes
2015–2023	The Flash	Hartley Rathaway / Pied Piper	9 episodes
2017–2018	Gone	James Finley	Main role; 12 episodes
2019	Law & Order: Special Victims Unit	Caleb Williams	Episode: "We Dream of Machine Elves"
2019	Heartstrings	Tyler	Episode: "Two Doors Down"
2020	Boy*Friends	Wesley	TV film
2024	Evil	Tober Lucas	Episode: "How to Dance in Three Easy Steps"
2026	Line of Fire	Elliot	Episode: "Cabin Pressure"
2026	American Horror Story	Roughneck #3	Episode: "Devil of a Good Time"
TBA	C-Side	TBA	Film; filming

== Bibliography ==
- The Backstagers series (published by Amulet Books)
- The Backstagers and the Ghost Light (September 2018)
- The Backstagers the Theater of the Ancients (March 2019)
- The Backstagers and the Final Blackout (September 2019)
- Fraternity book (published by Amulet Books) (September 2022)

== Awards and nominations ==
Year	Award	Category	Work	Result
2010	NYMF Awards	Outstanding Individual Performance	Shine!	Won
2011	NYMF Awards	Outstanding Individual Performance	Crazy, Just Like Me	Won
2014	Broadway.com Audience Choice Awards	Favorite Breakthrough Performance (Male)	Les Misérables	Won
2015	BroadwayWorld Los Angeles Awards	Best Featured Actor in a Play (Local Production)	Bent	Nominated
2015	BroadwayWorld Los Angeles Awards	Best Featured Actor in a Musical (Local Production)	Spring Awakening	Nominated
2015	Ovation Awards	Featured Actor in a Musical	Spring Awakening	Nominated
2015	Ovation Awards	Best Acting Ensemble for a Musical	Spring Awakening	Won
2016	Broadway.com Audience Choice Awards	Favorite Featured Actor in a Musical	Spring Awakening	Nominated
2016	Fred and Adele Astaire Awards	Outstanding Ensemble in a Broadway Show	Spring Awakening	Nominated

== See also ==
- LGBT culture in New York City
- List of LGBT people from New York City
- NYC Pride March
