= Bare: The Musical =

2012 coming-of-age rock musical

Bare
- The Musical
- Off-Broadway promotional poster
- Music: Damon Intrabartolo; Lynne Shankel (additional music)
- Lyrics: Jon Hartmere
- Book: Jon Hartmere
- Productions: 2012 Off-Broadway; 2015 Cardiff; 2016 Cork

Bare, also known as Bare: The Musical, is a coming-of-age rock musical with music by Damon Intrabartolo, and lyrics and a book by Jon Hartmere. It is a new version of Bare: A Pop Opera.

The revised musical began previews Off-Broadway on November 19, 2012, and opened on December 9, 2012, at New World Stages. Bare returned to Off-Broadway for a limited run in June 2013 at The York Theatre Company. This production was produced by Sponge Theatricals and Midtown Arts Common as a benefit for the LGBTQ youth homeless shelter, Trinity Place Shelter. The musical was produced by Paul Boskind, Randy Taradash, Gregory Rae, Carl D. White, Carollo & Palumbo LLC, and Martian Entertainment. Musical supervision and additional songs in this production were by Lynne Shankel and Hartmere. The creative team included director Stafford Arima, choreographer Travis Wall, set designer Donyale Werle, lighting designer Howell Binkley, costume designer Tristan Raines, sound designer Keith Caggiano, projection designer William Cusick, and hair and make up designer Leah J. Loukas. The original production closed on February 3, 2013.

== Productions ==
On February 18, 2016, Bare made its Irish debut in Cork at the C.I.T Cork School of Music. The show starred Michael Greene as Jason, Conor O'Boyle as Peter, Muirgen O'Mahony as Ivy, Tara Downes as Nadia and Luke Farell as Matt. The show went on to secure multiple A.I.M.S nominations, the countries highest musical theater accolade, including Best Male Singer for Greene's portrayal of Jason, Best Musical Director for Michael Young, Best Ensemble and Best Overall Show.

A concert special of Bare (a pop opera) was performed at the London Palladium on 7 April 2024 starring Jordan Luke Gage as Jason, and Laurie Kynaston as Peter.

== Changes from the pop opera to the musical ==
Reasons to stage a new production of Bare included an occurrence of LGBTQ suicides in the years following the 2004 production. In an article, Stafford Arima, the director of the current production, expressed his reasons, "Because of the timeliness of what's happening out there in the world, and because we have an author who is alive and living and present in this world, it only made sense to continue to evolve the piece so that it maintained its heart and its soul and its…guts”.

Although the basic plot and message have remained constant, one of the major changes has been altering the format from that of a pop opera to a book musical. Jon Hartmere, who wrote the book and lyrics, commented about that revision, saying, "The biggest change [is] having more space to explore the characters [...] To know these characters a little bit better... you just need more room — you need more room for book scenes, and I personally just wanted to get under the hood and investigate a little bit further."

Although Damon Intrabartolo did not play an active role in the current production, Shankel consulted with him concerning the revisions in order to follow through with his primary intent.

The team also added the start of Peter and Jason's relationship, took away the roommate aspect of their situation, and transferred the song “Role of a Lifetime” from Peter to Jason. No longer overweight, Nadia has been made the school drug dealer, and angry outcast. Ivy has been made a transfer student and is now dating Matt, reasons that provide a stronger basis for Nadia's anger. The students throw a birthday party for Jason instead of Ivy. The character of Peter's mother was eliminated, with aspects being incorporated into the progressive nun Sister Joan. Also added is the character of Father Mike. Both replace similar characters from the original production. The show's timeline is also very different. Jason does not break up with Ivy right away after break and 'Kiss Your Broken Heart'. Instead, they platonically date for a while. He breaks up with her right before 'Pilgrim's Hands' and reconciles with Peter after 'You're Not Alone'.

== Musical numbers ==
The below list is sourced from Playbill.

Act I

- A Million Miles From Heaven † — Students (In place of "Epiphany")
- You & I — Peter & Jason
- Portrait of a Girl — Matt & Ivy
- Easy Girls † †† — Jason, Nick, Beto, Zack, Alan, Madison, Vanessa, Ivy, Diane
- Drive You Out Of Your Mind † — Nadia & Students
- Best Kept Secret — Jason & Peter
- You Don't Know † — Nadia & Ivy
- Best Friend † — Diane & Peter
- Portrait of a Girl (reprise);—Ivy and Jason (In place of "One Kiss")
- Hail Mary † — Sr. Joan, Peter, Diane, Vanessa, Madison (In place of "911 Emergency")
- I Meant To Tell You — Peter & Jason (Same tune as/in place of "Ever After")
- Role of a Lifetime — Jason
- One — Students

Act II

- Confession — Fr. Mike & Students
- What If I Told † — Full Company
- Kiss Your Broken Heart — Ivy and Jason (Same tune as/in place of "Touch My Soul")
- Are You There? — Matt & Peter
- Pilgrim's Hands — Jason & Peter
- You're Not Alone † — Sr. Joan (In place of "God Don't Make No Trash")
- All Grown Up — Ivy
- Once Upon a Time — Jason
- Cross — Jason & Fr. Mike
- Bare — Jason & Peter
- Absolution — Peter
- No Voice — Students & Sr. Joan

† Music by Lynne Shankel; lyrics by Jon Hartmere

†† Removed from song list prior to December 9 opening

== Cast ==
The below list is sourced from Playbill.

Role	Cast member	Notes
Jason	Jason Hite	
Peter	Taylor Trensch	
Ivy	Elizabeth Judd	
Nadia	Barrett Wilbert Weed	
Matt	Gerard Canonico	
Sister Joan	Missi Pyle	
Father Mike	Jerold E. Solomon	
Diane	Alice Lee	Nadia understudy
Madison	Sara Kapner	Ivy understudy
Vanessa	Ariana Groover	
Alan	Alex Wyse	Peter understudy
Beto	Justin Gregory Lopez	Matt understudy
Nick	Michael Tacconi	Jason understudy
Zack	Casey Garvin	
Swings	Anthony Festa	Mainly: Alan, Beto, and Nick
Swings	Megan Lewis	Mainly: Diane, and Madison

== Stagecraft ==
The inspiration for the set designed by Donyale Werle "came from looking at the way teenagers decorate and express themselves." Applied to the surfaces of the set were 15,006 4 inch square photos that were provided through Instagram by fans, friends, and other sources. Additional inspiration was derived from stained glass windows in houses of worship, and Damien Hirst’s "Doorways to the Kingdom of Heaven " and "Lullaby, the Seasons ". The imagery of squares repeated in the Instagram photos as well as in major elements of the set was representative of the boxes that people put both themselves and others in, how people identify themselves and others.

The costume design by Tristan Raines came at the musical from a different standpoint than what has normally been seen. Although there were still elements of a"uniform" or "dress code", Raines' explored how when given a template, how does one chooses to express themselves and break out of that said template. This caused the show to break down the visual barrier set out by a uniform and allowed the audience to see who the character really was. This aided in the goal of creating more character development within the story and allowed audiences to connect with the characters. The show boasted close to 150 different looks ranging from the fashionable, the "emo puppy dog", Pop diva inspired Virgin Mary, to thrifted steampunk Romeo and Juliet costumes.

The projection design by William Cusick included pre-taped projections as well as the use of live feeds from on-stage cell phones. The audience viewed the live feeds. Cusick commented about the use of the images, "We speak and read in images now in a way that, fifty years ago, wasn't necessary for theater. For a show like this, about images of self and identity, it is absolutely necessary."

== Advocacy and influence ==
Reviewers accredited Bare's popularity and power to its open and prominent themes. LGBTQ audiences found its commentary on religion, education and family relevant to the lives of queer youth, particularly after a series of highly publicized LGBTQ suicides throughout the 2000s.

Producers of the 2012 Off-Broadway production partnered with organizations that support LGBTQ equality, including The Tyler Clementi Foundation, Athlete Ally, Human Rights Campaign and Faith in America.

A series of discussion sessions after performances called "talkOUTs" were organized, which were presented by representatives from the above foundations. The talkOUTs also included representatives from the Matthew Shepard Foundation, the Gay & Lesbian Victory Fund, GLAAD (the Gay and Lesbian Alliance Against Defamation), Empire State Pride Agenda, the Point Foundation, and Rabbi Michael Mellen, a former director of NFTY, along with the producers, creative team, and cast. The producers, creative team, and cast also showed support for the NOH8 Campaign.

== Planned film adaptation ==
On January 2, 2018, it was announced that Kristin Hanggi, who directed the original Los Angeles and New York productions of Bare: A Pop Opera, had adapted the musical into a screenplay and was planning to develop it into a motion picture. Tony Award-nominated producers Hillary Butorac Weaver and Janet Billig Rich were to produce the film. On the same day, fans of the show were asked to self-record video testimonials for use in the film's promotional materials. No further commentary has been made on production since this time.
