= List of Anger Management episodes =

Anger Management logo

Anger Management is an American comedy series that premiered on FX on June 28, 2012. The series is based on the 2003 film of the same name and stars Charlie Sheen in a role very loosely similar to the one originated by Jack Nicholson from the film. A total of 100 episodes were broadcast over two seasons.

== Series overview ==
Season	Episodes	Originally released	
Season	Episodes	First released	Last released
1	10	June 28, 2012	August 23, 2012
2	90	January 17, 2013	December 22, 2014

== Episodes ==
=== Season 1 (2012) ===
No. overall	No. in season	Title	Directed by	Written by	Original release date	Prod. code	US viewers (millions)
1	1	"Charlie Goes Back to Therapy"	Andy Cadiff	Story by : Bruce Helford; Teleplay by : Bruce Helford	June 28, 2012	1001	5.47
When Charlie almost beats his ex-wife's boyfriend (Brian Austin Green) with a lamp after an anger relapse, he decides he needs to go back to therapy. Unfortunately, he is currently having sex with the only therapist he trusts: his best friend Kate. Since the number-one rule of therapy is not to have sexual relations with patients, Charlie must choose between his love of sex and his need for help.
2	2	"Charlie and the Slumpbuster"	Gerry Cohen	Kristy Grant	June 28, 2012	1003	5.74
Charlie is visited by a troubled woman (Kerri Kenney-Silver) he had a one-night stand with while playing in the minor leagues. Wracked with the guilt of using her as his "slumpbuster", as well proving to his daughter that he isn't shallow, he pretends to date her and realizes she acts like less of a girlfriend and more of an obsessed stalker.
3	3	"Charlie Tries Sleep Deprivation"	Bob Koherr	Dave Caplan	July 5, 2012	1006	3.37
Inspired by Jennifer's behavior after a hectic and sleepless weekend, Charlie attempts a new way to help his patients, which involves putting them through 36 hours of sleep deprivation with the hope of releasing their inhibitions.
4	4	"Charlie and Kate Battle Over a Patient"	Andy Cadiff	Bob Kushell	July 12, 2012	1002	2.42
A long-standing rivalry over who's a better therapist leads to problems when Patrick, one of Charlie's group patients, decides to leave and see Kate instead.
5	5	"Charlie Tries to Prove Therapy is Legit"	Rob Schiller	Daley Haggar	July 19, 2012	1007	2.65
Charlie falls for Jen's hot new business partner, Lori (Denise Richards), only to find she thinks therapy is a scam. In the therapy group, Patrick asks Charlie to counsel the angry ghost of his mother, who he believes is haunting his apartment.
6	6	"Charlie Dates Kate's Patient"	Sam Simon	Shauna McGarry	July 26, 2012	1009	2.41
Inflamed by Kate's comment that he's only "nouveau smart", Charlie starts covertly dating a coffee-shop barista (Kristen Renton) with a PhD. The problem is that the woman is turned on by sex where there's a chance of getting caught—and she's Kate's patient. Meanwhile, Charlie tells his patients to call each other when they feel angry instead of him.
7	7	"Charlie's Patient Gets Out of Jail"	Gerry Cohen	Michael Loftus	August 2, 2012	1004	1.58
Charlie and his ex, Jennifer, are having an issue with how Charlie still tries to manage her life when Cleo—one of Charlie's patients from his prison anger therapy group—shows up on his doorstep, fresh out on parole. Jennifer decides to get back at Charlie by dating the ex-con.
8	8	"Charlie Outs a Patient"	Rob Schiller	Brian Posehn	August 9, 2012	1008	2.10
Charlie has to evaluate the depth of his involvement in his patient's lives when he tries to help his patient Nolan who has difficulty asserting himself and has become involved with a woman who has no such problem.
9	9	"Charlie's Dad Visits"	Bob Koherr	Story by : Daley Haggar; Teleplay by : Brian Posehn & Kristy Grant	August 16, 2012	1010	2.05
Charlie gets an unexpected visit from his father, (played by Sheen's real-life father Martin Sheen), who tells him he wants to move in with him. In the therapy group, Charlie attempts to help Lacey with road rage.
10	10	"Charlie Gets Romantic"	Bob Koherr	Janae Bakken	August 23, 2012	1005	1.98
After Charlie and Kate have sex, he innocently asks her if she wants to go to a movie. Kate interprets this as a romantic gesture, rushes to fix him up on a date the next day with someone else and the two begin to examine the nature of their relationship. At home, Sam kisses a girl at school and a picture of it ends up on Facebook. Charlie and Jennifer have worries that their daughter is a lesbian.

=== Season 2 (2013–14) ===
Season 2 debuted on FX on January 17, 2013. In an effort to boost the show's sagging Season 2 ratings, FX announced in May that four episodes (two of them first-run) would air on FX's parent network Fox on Monday nights in June, starting June 3.

In June 2013, a press release for an episode titled "Charlie and Kate Have Sex for Science" was released stating that the episode was set to air on June 27, 2013, as the twenty-sixth episode of the season. Following the aftermath of Selma Blair's dismissal from the series, the planned broadcast was canceled and replaced with "Charlie and the Hot Nerd" - the first episode produced without Blair. The status of "Charlie and Kate Have Sex for Science" is unknown as all episodes with production codes up to, and including, 1040 (Blair's final episode) have aired. An episode with a similar title, but with different storylines, named "Charlie Does It For Science" aired on December 5, 2013.

On November 7, 2014, FX announced that the series would end after its 100th episode airs on December 22, 2014.

No. overall	No. in season	Title	Directed by	Written by	Original release date	Prod. code	US viewers (millions)
11	1	"Charlie Loses it at a Baby Shower"	Steve Zuckerman	Michael Loftus	January 17, 2013	1013	1.82
Kate starts feeling even more like she and Charlie are becoming a couple, when he takes her to his sister's baby shower and the two start beating married couples at a version of the "Newlywed Game." Charlie then loses control of his anger when his sister becomes overly judgmental of both him and Kate. Meanwhile Patrick is convinced that Ed's daughter is a lesbian, and tries to tell him.
12	2	"Charlie's Dad Starts to Lose It"	Andy Cadiff	Clay Graham	January 17, 2013	1015	1.66
Charlie grows concerned when his father begins to show signs of Alzheimer's disease. Patrick tries to help Nolan dress for success.
13	3	"Charlie and the Ex–Patient"	Gerry Cohen	Daley Haggar	January 24, 2013	1022	1.34
Charlie worries about ethical boundaries when he begins dating a sexy former patient (Kate Reinders). But he soon learns that her other previous therapists, including his arch-enemy Dr. Lesley Moore (Steve Valentine), are after the same thing that he is.
14	4	"Charlie's Dad Breaks Bad"	Bob Koherr	Eric Weinberg	January 31, 2013	1020	1.40
Charlie thinks that his father has gotten mixed up with a bad crowd of rogue senior citizens, until he learns that Martin is the ringleader.
15	5	"Charlie & Jen Together Again"	Gerry Cohen	Bob Kushell	February 7, 2013	1011	0.99
After a black mold outbreak, Jennifer and Sam temporarily move in with Charlie while their house gets fumigated. Kate is less than pleased to learn that Jen and Charlie will be living together.
16	6	"Charlie and Deception Therapy"	Andy Cadiff	Eric Weinberg	February 14, 2013	1016	0.93
Ed has been crankier than usual, so Charlie and the group persuade him to take a placebo pill that supposedly reduces anger. The plan seems to work out great and Ed claims that he no longer needs therapy, but it eventually backfires sending Ed back to Charlie's group. Jennifer wants to know Kate better, so she insists that Charlie let her go out with them.
17	7	"Charlie Dates a Teacher"	Bob Koherr	Michael Loftus	February 21, 2013	1027	1.04
Charlie dates his daughter's teacher after meeting with her to discuss Sam's grades, and he soon starts to fear that Sam's grades are related to how well he performs in bed.
18	8	"Charlie & Cee Lo"	Gerry Cohen	Daniel Dratch	February 28, 2013	1025	1.20
Charlie takes on Cee Lo Green as an anger therapy patient. Cee Lo's requests go way beyond anger management, but Charlie is reluctant to back out because it may jeopardize the dream job that Cee Lo helped Patrick land. Meanwhile, Lacey, with Nolan's help, attempts to become a model.
19	9	"Charlie is an Expert Witness"	Gerry Cohen	Daniel Dratch	March 7, 2013	1012	1.27
Nolan has become unusually quiet in group therapy, so Charlie gives him a weekend assignment to paint his feelings. Lacey takes a surprising liking to the macabre work of art, while Ed attempts to get his wife out of his new "man-cave". Meanwhile, Charlie and Kate testify as expert witnesses for different sides in a court case.
20	10	"Charlie & Catholicism"	Steve Zuckerman	Dave Caplan	March 14, 2013	1014	0.85
Charlie gets into an argument with Martin after he finds out he had Sam baptized behind his back.
21	11	"Charlie Dates Crazy, Sexy, Angry"	Andy Cadiff	Kristy Grant	April 4, 2013	1023	1.02
Lori (Denise Richards), the gorgeous yet eccentric woman who dated Charlie previously, returns and wants to start things anew. But Charlie realizes she can only enjoy sex with him when she's angry. While out on the town with Jennifer, Kate gets ignored as all the men hit on Jen. Kate discovers she is giving off a "vibe" that she's attached. Meanwhile, Patrick and Ed compete to find the ideal rich guy for Lacey.
22	12	"Charlie Gets Lindsay Lohan in Trouble"	Bob Koherr	Dave Caplan & Bruce Helford & Bob Kushell	April 11, 2013	1036	1.25
To help keep her anger under control on the set of a commercial, Lindsay Lohan (playing herself) hires Charlie to be her anger management consultant. The two get romantic, leading to a series of mishaps that damage Lindsay's already tarnished reputation. Meanwhile, Lacey models a dress for Patrick.
23	13	"Charlie and Lacey Piss Off the Neighborhood"	Bob Koherr	Daley Haggar	April 18, 2013	1026	1.29
When a neighbor gets wind that patients with anger issues are meeting at Charlie's house, he organizes a protest to get the group relocated. Lacey encounters the neighbor and makes the situation worse. Meanwhile, Kate helps Sam and Jen pick a dress for Sam's prom.
24	14	"Charlie and Kate Horse Around"	Bob Koherr	Shauna McGarry	April 18, 2013	1028	1.13
When Sam's favorite horse from her riding stable is relocated to an "equine therapy" farm, Charlie decides a visit to the farm might be beneficial to his anger group. While the group bickers over dividing up the chores to care for the horse, Charlie and Kate sneak the horse out for a romantic evening ride, with disastrous results. Meanwhile, when Sam visits the farm, she takes a liking to a stableboy, to the concern of Charlie and Jen.
25	15	"Charlie's Patients Hook Up"	Gerry Cohen	Renée Estevez	April 25, 2013	1018	0.68
When Lacey has her driver's license suspended again due to a fit of anger over her latest date, Charlie confronts her about the type of man she always seems to hook up with and inadvertently pushes her into a date with Nolan. Lacey returns to the next session and announces that she and Nolan are a couple, but it is clear she is just using him to drive her around and do her bidding. While on a "date" with Nolan at a 7–11, Lacey is caught shoplifting, thus violating her probation and sending her to jail. Meanwhile, after Sam overcomes her OCD somewhat, Charlie attempts to put a tracker on her phone, but it malfunctions.
26	16	"Charlie and Kate's Dirty Pictures"	Bob Koherr	Rob Ulin	May 2, 2013	1019	0.95
Trying to help Nolan stand on his own, Charlie convinces Kate to give him a job as her receptionist. When Nolan leaks to Charlie that he found dirty pictures of Kate in an outgoing mail envelope, Charlie resolves to find out who is receiving the photos and why. Meanwhile, Charlie facilitates an anger therapy session in a women's prison, and Lacey is one of the group members.
27	17	"Charlie Lets Kate Take Charge"	Gerry Cohen	Dave Caplan	May 9, 2013	1021	1.13
Charlie is asked to fill in as coach of a high school baseball team, and Martin convinces him to take him along as his assistant coach. It becomes clear that little has changed since Martin used to be Charlie's manager. In Charlie's absence, Kate fills in as his anger group's therapist, but her methods sharply contrast with Charlie's.
28	18	"Charlie and the Break-Up Coach"	Gerry Cohen	Ray James	May 16, 2013	1017	0.64
When Jen gives Patrick some good advice following a break-up and the two start hanging together, she announces to Charlie that she's found her calling and is starting a career as a "life coach". Meanwhile, Lacey tries to introduce Martin to 21st century dating, and helps him set up a Facebook page.
29	19	"Charlie, Kate and Jen Get Romantic"	Andy Cadiff	Bob Kushell	May 23, 2013	1024	0.78
As Martin tries to get Charlie and Jen back together, he inadvertently pushes a jealous Kate to act towards making her and Charlie a couple, but events then take a surprising turn. Meanwhile, Ed is ecstatic to have the house to himself as his wife goes out of town for six days, but he has to call in his "anger buddy" Nolan when a situation arises on the homefront.
30	20	"Charlie Breaks Up With Kate"	Bob Koherr	Eric Weinberg	May 30, 2013	1029	1.02
Sean (Brian Austin Green), Jennifer's ne'er-do-well ex-boyfriend [Season 1, Episode 1], is back in her life. Much to Charlie's irritation, Sam starts to bond with Sean, even taking her first driving lesson with him. Charlie gets annoyed that his therapy group members are not supporting each other, so for their next session he has them report to a soup kitchen to help the homeless. Charlie is finding it difficult to go along with his and Kate's new "just friends" status, but when he announces that he wants a complete break-up, she has some news which makes him reconsider.
31	21	"Charlie & His New Therapist"	Gerry Cohen	Renée Estevez	June 3, 2013 (Fox)	1031	1.65
After his break-up with Kate, Charlie shows a return of his anger outbursts, so he returns to therapy with a new therapist (Marion Ross), but he becomes concerned over the unusual techniques she employs. Meanwhile, anger leads Patrick to pull a lottery prank on Ed, which has unintended consequences.
32	22	"Charlie and Kate Start a Sex Study"	Gerry Cohen	Ray James	June 6, 2013	1030	1.11
Charlie has reluctantly agreed to continue with a funded study which he and Kate had applied for, to compare the sexual satisfaction of couples in committed, monogamous relationships with those in casual relationships, but their issues with each other cloud their judgment in selecting candidates. Meanwhile, Lacey has started a new job as a pharmaceutical rep that requires six weeks of training, and wants to get fired from her current job so she can collect unemployment. So she enlists both Nolan's and Patrick's help in getting her fired.
33	23	"Charlie and the Secret Gigolo"	Gerry Cohen	Daniel Dratch	June 10, 2013 (Fox)	1032	1.71
Sean gets arrested after decking a man who grabbed Jen's rear end, and is required to join Charlie's therapy group. After a rift in Sean's first session, he reveals to Charlie that he used to be an escort. Charlie tries to figure out a way to let Jen know without breaking confidentiality. Ed continues to stay in Patrick's home, but constantly complains about the fact that Patrick does not have a television.
34	24	"Charlie and His New Friend With Benefits"	Kevin Sullivan	Bob Kushell	June 13, 2013	1037	0.78
Charlie is attracted to the sexy woman Tracey (Mircea Monroe) who is in his and Kate's study with her boyfriend Matt. As they split up and she says she's looking for a friend with benefits, Charlie is eager to help her. But he soon realizes she's way too clingy and (without knowing) looking for a relationship. Charlie tells her, they split up, and she gets back together with her ex. Meeting in the bar, Patrick introduces his fellow opera fan, 73-year-old Carol (Carol Kane), to Nolan. She takes a fancy to Nolan and they spend lots of time together smoking pot and end up having sex. But when Nolan realizes how much Carol's friendship means to Patrick, he breaks up with her.
35	25	"Charlie and the Airport Sext"	Gerry Cohen	Shauna McGarry	June 20, 2013	1034	0.92
Charlie arranges a trip to Lake Tahoe for his therapy group to celebrate their 30th consecutive day without an anger incident among them. While the group is stuck at San Francisco airport, Charlie receives a text from Kate which makes him think she has reconsidered and wants a relationship with him, but it turns out to be a mistake caused by her phone's auto-correct feature. Meanwhile, Michael is put in charge of Charlie's house while he is gone, and he learns that Jen has rented it out to a film crew.
36	26	"Charlie and the Hot Nerd"	Gerry Cohen	Daley Haggar	June 27, 2013	1041	1.21
Charlie dates a hot techie named Monica (Nicole Travolta) who wires all the electrical devices in his house so that they can be controlled via the Internet. But the house goes crazy when Monica's ex-boyfriend, another IT nerd, becomes jealous and vows to make Charlie's life a living hell. Meanwhile, Lacey's first sales call in her new job as a pharmaceutical rep doesn't go as planned.
37	27	"Charlie Dates a Serial Killer's Sister"	Gerry Cohen	Michael Loftus	July 11, 2013	1045	1.09
After his prison group therapy session, Charlie meets a hot woman named Wynona (LeAnn Rimes), who is on the way in to visit her brother. After they have been sleeping together for two weeks, he finds out she is Wayne's sister and worries that she may have inherited the same tendencies as her brother. Meanwhile, Patrick learns that Nolan refused a date with an interested waitress because Lacey puts on a show for him every night from her bedroom window.
38	28	"Charlie and the Cheating Patient"	Bob Koherr	Kristy Grant	July 18, 2013	1033	0.87
Charlie becomes convinced that Sean is cheating on Jen with Lacey, so he tells Jen who breaks up with Sean. After Sean convinces Charlie that he was wrong, Jen takes him back, but Charlie is still suspicious. Meanwhile, Nolan is freaked out after his apartment is robbed, and he asks Patrick and Ed to stay over with him. Ed takes his gun with him.
39	29	"Charlie and the Hit and Run"	Gerry Cohen	Rob Ulin	July 25, 2013	1035	0.84
While driving with Ed, Martin hits a woman and takes off. Ed convinces him to empty his bank account and hide the money in case the woman's family sues, so Martin gives $35,000 each to Charlie, Jen and Sam. When it turns out the woman's family isn't going to sue, as she is a former stuntwoman with dementia, Martin wants the money back. But Sam's has been put into a college fund, and Jen spent hers on a food truck that specializes in year-round thanksgiving meals which turns out to be another bust. Meanwhile, Lacey is bribed by Patrick into taking Nolan out on the town, then actually gets jealous when Nolan spends most of the night with her sister, Sateen.
40	30	"Charlie and the Virgin"	Bob Koherr	Shauna McGarry	August 1, 2013	1039	0.98
Kate tells Charlie that a 32-year-old virgin patient of hers is looking for a "first experience" that won't be traumatizing, and Kate thinks a "close friend" might be the ideal sex surrogate. Charlie assumes she's asking him, but she was just "thinking aloud" and decides to go with a professional sex surrogate. Meanwhile, Sam and Jen's new hippie boyfriend Canvas get tattoos to test Jen, but even though Jen freaks out, because of how she expects Charlie will react, they don't tell her the whole story.
41	31	"Charlie Kills His Ex's Sex Life"	Gerry Cohen	Kristy Grant	August 8, 2013	1042	0.85
Charlie misinterprets Jen's suggestion that Canvas feng shui his house and winds up throwing a barbecue. Canvas makes some unintended snarky comments about Charlie's age, so Charlie challenges him to a one-on-one basketball match. After losing several games, Charlie finally wins by forfeit when Canvas twists his ankle. Later that night, Canvas passes away after having sex with Jen. Both Jen and Charlie think they killed him, but it turns out Canvas had a heart condition that he ignored. Meanwhile, Lacey announces that she has landed her first photo shoot as a model, but the clothing she has to model isn't what she expected.
42	32	"Charlie and the Prison Riot"	Gerry Cohen	Clay Graham	August 15, 2013	1038	1.10
Michael accompanies Charlie to his prison group as part of a program to teach inmates the real estate business. Both get trapped when a prison riot breaks out. Kate worries about Charlie upon learning of the riot on the news, and her reaction after he returns to work safely has Charlie believing for sure that she has feelings for him.
43	33	"Charlie and Kate Do It For Money"	Bob Koherr	Dave Caplan	September 5, 2013	1040	0.80
When Charlie and Kate have to make a pitch for new funding for their study, the coordinator, Lisa (Michaela Watkins), hints that a meeting outside the office might "seal the deal". Charlie reluctantly agrees to see her, but finds out Lisa is gay and is attracted to Kate, who equally reluctantly agrees to see her. Kate discovers that Lisa's male boss makes the final decisions. Nolan meets someone online that turns out to be a 10-year-old girl who begins blackmailing him, so Lacey offers to help. Final appearance of: Selma Blair as Kate Wales
44	34	"Charlie and the Sting"	Gerry Cohen	Daniel Dratch	September 12, 2013	1044	0.75
Charlie asks Jen to play a scientist looking for a research grant, so he can get Dr. Moore (the man Kate wants to sleep with) to admit that he sleeps with candidates then doesn't give them any grant money. Although the sting eventually succeeds, Charlie finds a note from Kate stating she has left town, disgusted with herself that she was willing to have sex for a grant. Meanwhile, Lacey brings Martin along to her yoga class and asks him to pretend to be her father, so that her hot instructor will see her as a kindhearted woman.
45	35	"Charlie Gets the Party Started"	Gerry Cohen	Daley Haggar	September 19, 2013	1049	0.84
With Kate having moved away, Charlie has taken to drinking heavily and he plans a wild party. Visiting a local strip club to find girls to invite, he finds that Sean is the manager and Sean agrees to help but only if Charlie will convince Jen to give Sean another chance. Meanwhile, Ed is trying to win back his estranged wife, and he asks Lacey to hook him up with a prescription ointment for his manhood.
46	36	"Charlie and the Grad Student"	Bob Koherr	Clay Graham	September 26, 2013	1046	N/A
Charlie invites Ellie (Brea Grant), an attractive grad-student, to observe a therapy session only to have to compete with Nolan for her affection. Meanwhile, Ed and Martin come up with a plan to scam the government by hosting a disabled war veteran in their house.
47	37	"Charlie's New Sex Study Partner"	Bob Koherr	Dave Caplan & Bruce Helford & Bob Kushell	October 3, 2013	1047	0.66
Charlie interviews possible replacements for Kate to help with his sex study, but then learns that psychologist Dr. Jordan Denby (Laura Bell Bundy) has already been appointed by the grant foundation to take the spot. Meanwhile, Jen and Lacey plot their revenge against Sean.
48	38	"Charlie and the Sex Addict"	Steve Zuckerman	Bob Kushell	October 10, 2013	1051	0.68
Charlie is introduced to Blake (Gina La Piana), a recovering alcoholic and Jordan's AA sponsor. Blake is later revealed to also be a recovering sex addict, and Charlie can't help fueling her addiction. Meanwhile, Ed helps Patrick with a challenging full-figure dress design.
49	39	"Charlie and the Hooker"	Steve Zuckerman	Corinne Stikeman	October 24, 2013	1054	0.62
Charlie accepts a new patient, a pimp named Ray James II, into his therapy group. After Charlie sleeps with a young woman called Sasha (Anna Hutchison) who approached him at the bar, she reveals that she's a hooker and that Ray sent her as payment for his sessions. Meanwhile, Lacey, Nolan and Ed are creeped out by Ray, and attempt to hold their own self-help session without Charlie present.
50	40	"Charlie and the Devil"	Gerry Cohen	Renée Estevez	October 31, 2013	1048	0.69
Charlie invites a new therapy patient named Bob (Bob Clendenin) into the group, who casually tells everyone that he is the devil. Nolan makes a deal with Bob to sell his soul in exchange for Lacey falling in love with him. When Lacey is all over Nolan at the next session, even the skeptical Charlie starts to wonder. Meanwhile, Jen falls for a new neighbor while Sam falls for a young man who appears to be the neighbor's son, but the two are later revealed to be gay.
51	41	"Charlie and Sean and the Battle of the Exes"	Shelley Jensen	Andy Roth	November 7, 2013	1052	0.75
Charlie finally gives in and tries to help Sean reconnect with Jen, but after Jen reiterates how much she "hates, hates, hates" Sean, she sleeps with Charlie. Sean is angered, but appears to rebound when Jordan reveals the two are dating. When Jen wants to know more about the woman Sean is dating, Charlie realizes Sean is just using Jordan to make Jen jealous. Meanwhile, Patrick is convinced his good looks make it impossible for him to meet anyone other than shallow men, so he has Lacey and Nolan "ugly" him up for a night out.
52	42	"Charlie Helps Lacey Stay Rich"	Gerry Cohen	Rob Ulin	November 14, 2013	1043	0.82
Lacey's parents cut her off, so Charlie agrees to help her out by talking to her parents at dinner. After Charlie says how mature and responsible Lacey has gotten, her parents decide it's time for her to move to India for an arranged marriage. In an effort to prevent this from happening, Charlie says that Lacey is already in a serious relationship. Patrick agrees to pretend to be Lacey's boyfriend for a night. At dinner, Lacey's parents give their blessing and promise that if Lacey and Patrick were to marry, they would give them one million dollars as a gift. Patrick is struggling with money issues and immediately proposes to Lacey, who accepts just as quickly. Meanwhile, Sam keeps hitting animals with the car, and Ed and Martin become temporarily famous when a video of them goes viral.
53	43	"Charlie Loses His Virginity Again"	Steve Zuckerman	Daniel Dratch	November 21, 2013	2055	0.68
Jennifer announces that the woman (Gina Gershon) to whom Charlie lost his virginity in high school (while Charlie and Jen were dating) is in town. Charlie goes to see her, and she remembers aloud that it was so quick, she's "not even sure it counted." This makes Charlie determined to sleep with the woman again as a "do-over", but he must initiate a series of favors to make it happen. Meanwhile, Lacey's parents have to stay at her and Patrick's place for a few days, complicating their marriage ruse, especially when Patrick's boyfriend (Andy Mientus) shows up.
54	44	"Charlie Does It for Science"	Bob Koherr	Michael Loftus	December 5, 2013	2057	0.65
Charlie and Jordan are interviewed by a reporter named Vanessa (Kim Shaw) about their sex study. Jordan leaves early, and Vanessa convinces Charlie that she should 'test' their sex machine with him to be able to write an informed report. When Jordan and Charlie see the test results showing that Vanessa is in love with Charlie, Jordan thinks Vanessa will doubt the results and trash the study, so Charlie visits Vanessa to convince her that she really is in love with him. But he discovers that Vanessa is not a reporter and that she really is in love with him. Meanwhile, Nolan gets a job at a lingerie store, which leads to Lacey and Jen taking advantage of his employee discount.
55	45	"Charlie and Lacey Shack Up"	Bob Koherr	Daley Haggar	December 12, 2013	2056	0.91
Lacey gets sentenced to house arrest and moves in with Charlie. After intentionally ruining two of Charlie's dates, Lacey reveals she's upset that Charlie never hit on her while she was there. Meanwhile, Sean plays wingman to help Michael get laid.
56	46	"Charlie and the Christmas Hooker"	Bob Koherr	Shauna McGarry	December 19, 2013	2058	0.94
Sasha (Anna Hutchison), a hooker from Charlie's past, returns with an offer for Charlie for the two of them to sail a yacht to Hawaii as a favor for her friend, but they have to leave on Christmas eve and he has already invited his therapy group for a get-together that evening. Elsewhere, Sean misinterprets Jordan's intentions when she intentionally drives away his date and then invites him over to decorate her Christmas tree, while Ed steals a Mexican-looking baby Jesus from a local church's Nativity scene.
57	47	"Charlie and the Pajama Intervention"	Bob Koherr	Dave Caplan	January 23, 2014	1050	1.08
While at his bank wearing only a T-shirt and pajama bottoms (sans underwear), Charlie becomes outraged over bank policies and fees and pulls his pants down. After spending a night in jail, he learns that the APA may suspend his license. Meanwhile, his patients have been trying to find another therapist after Charlie is frequently tardy and hung over, but they can't find anyone that measures up. In the end, Charlie has Jordan, Sean and his patients all appear as character witnesses before an APA panel, but only Jordan's wits (and strategic crying) can save Charlie's license.
58	48	"Charlie Sets Jordan Up with a Serial Killer"	Bob Koherr	Rob Ulin	January 30, 2014	2059	0.75
Jordan accompanies Charlie to counsel the prison group. While there, Wayne pulls Charlie aside and explains that he is about to be transferred to a Texas prison, where he has many enemies and is sure to be killed. He proposes that Jordan gets engaged to him, which the prison board will view as a reason to keep him in California. What's in it for Charlie? If he can convince Jordan to go along with the idea, Wayne will offer him the chance to write his story, for which a publisher has already offered a seven-figure sum. Meanwhile, Lacey doesn't feel the $100,000 her parents gave her for a wedding ceremony is enough to cover the event plus all her "accessories", so she and Patrick try to double the money in Las Vegas.
59	49	"Charlie and the Twins"	Bob Koherr	Clay Graham	February 6, 2014	2063	0.73
Jordan's twin sister, identical in every way except hair color and the addition of fake boobs, is in town. Jordan tells Charlie that the two don't get along ever since her sister slept with her former fiancee. She asks Charlie to help mend the damage between them, but he winds up sleeping with the twin. Elsewhere, Lacey's sister blackmails her into buying her whatever she wants in exchange for not revealing to their parents that the marriage to Patrick is a sham.
60	50	"Charlie and Sean Fight Over a Girl"	Steve Zuckerman	Kristy Grant	February 27, 2014	2061	0.72
When Patrick brings Molly (Masiela Lusha), his friend from Iowa, to Charlie's house to meet the gang, Lacey and Nolan make a bet over who will sleep with Molly first -- Charlie or Sean. The two guys also make their own bet, then go to great lengths to please Molly and try to get her alone. She eventually says she likes them both and offers a three-way, but that goes by the wayside when she begins to think that Charlie and Sean are a gay couple. Meanwhile, Jordan asks Patrick to sing with her on an original song at her AA group's annual talent show.
61	51	"Charlie and the Last Temptation of Eugenio"	Bob Koherr	Bob Kushell	March 6, 2014	2062	1.04
Eugene Alvarez (Eugenio Derbez), a drinking buddy from Charlie's past, is now a novice priest performing the wedding ceremony for Lacey and Patrick. Charlie is convinced his friend made a mistake, and he tries to tempt him with booze and hookers before remembering Eugene always had the hots for Jennifer. Meanwhile, Lacey and Patrick are a day away from their wedding when "Fat Mahesh", the man from India Lacey was arranged to marry, shows up for the rehearsal dinner -- only he's now slim, handsome and rich.
62	52	"Charlie and the Hot Latina"	Bob Koherr	Eric Weinberg	March 13, 2014	2060	0.74
Ed and Martin ask Charlie to help them deal with their loud Latin neighbors, whom Ed assumes are Mexican but are actually from El Salvador. When Charlie arrives, he meets a hot Latina woman and sleeps with her, despite finding out she is leading the charge to get Ed and Martin evicted from their apartment.
63	53	"Charlie and His Probation Officer's Daughter"	Shelley Jensen	Kimberly Altamirano	March 20, 2014	1053	0.88
Charlie has office sex with the receptionist while waiting to see his APA probation officer, then later finds out that the woman is the daughter of his probation officer (Kevin Dobson) and that she obsesses over any man who sleeps with her. Acting on advice from his prison therapy group, Charlie uses Jennifer in a ruse to get the woman to leave him.
64	54	"Charlie Gets Date Rated"	Steve Zuckerman	Dave Caplan	March 27, 2014	2064	0.67
Charlie wants to date a beautiful woman named Holly, but she tells him she'll only do so if he gets good ratings on "Lizzy", an Internet site where women can rate the men they date. In order to get one, Charlie goes on a fake date with Jordan, whom he then leaves because Holly is there as well. Thus, Jordan gives him a bad rating. Charlie changes the review when Jordan is in the bathroom and gets a date with Holly, which is ruined when Jordan confronts him. Meanwhile, Ed dates Nolan's mother and teaches him how to ride a bike.
65	55	"Charlie and Jordan Go to Prison"	Bob Koherr	Shauna McGarry	April 3, 2014	2065	0.66
When the sex study ends and a publisher is interested, Jordan finds that the publishing offer is from Maxim magazine. As she was hoping for the study to wind up in a respected medical journal, Jordan rejects Maxim's offer, to the dismay of both Charlie and a rep from the university. Charlie later has an idea to use his skills helping prisoners re-enter society, but is told that adding a woman gives him a better chance to get funding. After not finding a suitable female partner, he turns to a now-drunk Jordan and receives a non-answer. Meanwhile, Lacey is homeless after her parents cut her off, and is tricked by Nolan into moving into the apartment next to his.
66	56	"Charlie and the Re-Virginized Hooker"	Bob Koherr	Michael Loftus	April 10, 2014	2067	0.70
Charlie, not realizing the time of day, is caught by his therapy group having sex with his girlfriend Sasha (Anna Hutchison). When his continued relationship with Sasha makes him late for work, Jordan is left to attend a sexual harassment seminar at the prison alone. Jordan then decides to interfere with Charlie's sex life with Sasha by convincing Sasha to refrain from having sex for six months as a "cleanse," telling her that she is doing the same. Upset by Jordan's meddling, Charlie convinces Sasha that Jordan was lying and that what they were doing together is fine. Meanwhile, Ed, Patrick and Nolan decide to renovate Lacey's apartment after earlier hearing her complain.
67	57	"Charlie Catches Jordan in the Act"	Bob Koherr	Kristy Grant	April 17, 2014	2066	0.75
Charlie proclaims Jordan ready to handle a prisoner counseling session on her own, mainly because he wants to attend a "stripper bus" party for Sean's birthday. While counseling a handsome prisoner named Tim, a nervous (and slightly drunk) Jordan makes out with him. Facing the prospect of losing their program, Charlie meets with Tim to ask for his silence, but is blackmailed. Charlie then asks Wayne if he can talk to Tim. Charlie and Jordan freak out the next day when they hear that Tim "fell" to his death from the roof of the administration building. Elsewhere, Sean offers to model clothing for Patrick to help the latter make a video audition for a fashion-themed reality show.
68	58	"Charlie Spends the Night with Lacey"	Bob Koherr	Eric Weinberg	April 24, 2014	2068	0.59
Upon learning that he is getting married, Lacey is determined to kill her ex-boyfriend, whom she previously shot in the testicles, so Charlie has to take desperate measures to keep her from carrying out her threat. Meanwhile, Jordan takes care of Sean when he catches flu, but then catches the flu herself, leading to the two later having cough syrup-fuelled sex.
69	59	"Charlie Screws a Prisoner's Girlfriend"	Steve Zuckerman	Bob Kushell	May 1, 2014	2069	0.56
After Charlie and Jordan counsel a prisoner who is close to being released, the prisoner gives Charlie a rat-tooth necklace that he made and asks him to deliver it to his girlfriend for her birthday. Charlie does so, but the woman says she plans to leave her boyfriend and offers Charlie sex. The prisoner later tells Charlie his girlfriend has told him she had sex with another man, and he vows to track him down and kill him. Meanwhile, Charlie asks his therapy group members to support Nolan in giving up weed by giving up something they love for 24 hours.
70	60	"Charlie Cops a Feel"	Steve Zuckerman	Bob Kushell	May 8, 2014	2072	0.65
After a night of passion with a woman that turns out to be a cop, Charlie's fear of authority figures resurfaces when he rides along with her on the job and sees her manhandle a perp. Meanwhile, Jordan and Sean reflect on their recent hookup, and spend the next few days trying to figure out if they can have a casual sex relationship.
71	61	"Charlie, Lacey and the Dangerous Plumber"	Steve Zuckerman	Daniel Dracht	May 15, 2014	2071	0.72
A prisoner named Jack, doing time for B & E, theft and gun charges, is in his final counseling session with Charlie and Jordan before being released. Charlie expresses confidence that Jack will be able to successfully re-enter society, but is then reluctant to hire him to do some plumbing work. Though he does hire Jack, Charlie follows him everywhere, and later worries that Lacey is using him to break into her ex-boyfriend's apartment. Elsewhere, Patrick schemes to use Nolan to reverse his fortunes on his fashion design reality show.
72	62	"Charlie and the Mother of All Sessions"	Bob Koherr	Dave Caplan	May 29, 2014	2074	0.50
Following an argument with Martin, Charlie is convinced the root of his therapy group's anger lies in their relationships with their parents. He secretly invites a parent of each member (Lacy's mother, Ed's surprisingly-still-alive mother, Nolan's deadbeat father, and Patrick's "father") to the next session, and tries to get each pair to discuss their issues. Elsewhere, Jordan is determined to have sex with Sean in a public place.
73	63	"Charlie and Sean's Twisted Sister"	Bob Koherr	Michael Loftus	August 4, 2014	2075	0.72
Sean's sister, an artist named Lauren (Aly Michalka), arrives in town, and Sean tells Charlie not to have sex with her, but when Lauren visits Charlie at his house, she clearly has other ideas. Charlie politely declines because of his promise to Sean, but she responds by kissing Charlie on the lips. Lauren then attempts to get back at Sean, by painting a picture of her and Charlie having sex, which Charlie rushes to buy before Sean can see it. Elsewhere, Patrick and Lacey think they picked up the same guy in a club and they compete for his affections.
74	64	"Charlie Has a Threesome"	Bob Koherr	Daley Haggar	August 4, 2014	2076	0.60
Charlie and Sasha are hitting it off again, and Sasha suggests a threesome with a friend and fellow "escort", Jenna (Tiffany Dupont). Afterwards, things get complicated when Jenna reveals she only agreed to the threesome as she is in love with Sasha and aims to break up Charlie and Sasha. Meanwhile, a broke Lacey decides to sell some of her eggs, but to enhance her profile she uses Jordan's resume as her own.
75	65	"Charlie and the Lap Dance of Doom"	Bob Koherr	Eric Weinberg	August 11, 2014	2073	0.56
Sean tells Charlie some ideas for boosting revenues at the strip club he manages, and Charlie shares them with one of the club's dancers after sleeping with her. When he hears that Sean has been fired and the dancer appointed manager in his place by using Sean's ideas, Charlie tries to fix things, but Sean finds out when Nolan blabs. With Sean vowing revenge, Charlie seeks out the club's owner, who tells him he fired Sean for having sex with some of the dancers. Lacey joins an AA group to woo a millionaire she knows will be at a local meeting.
76	66	"Charlie Tests His Will Power"	Bob Koherr	Bob Kushell	August 11, 2014	2078	0.60
Charlie learns he will be counseling Will (John Witherspoon), a convicted murderer who had served 50 years in prison but has just been declared innocent based on DNA evidence. A reporter from the New York Times persuades Charlie to get her an exclusive interview with Will by promising Charlie a prominent mention when the article is published. But Charlie senses trouble when Will angrily blames the press for convicting him in the media and preventing a fair trial back in 1964. Jordan goes to great lengths to prove to Sean that she is not falling for him as a boyfriend.
77	67	"Charlie and the Psychic Therapist"	Bob Koherr	Kristy Grant	August 18, 2014	2077	0.67
Ed tells the group about a phoney "psychic" marriage counselor, Dr. Randy (Michael Gross), who has taken him for a bunch of money. Charlie offers to investigate Dr Randy, and Jordan reluctantly agrees to act as Charlie's estranged wife. Sean makes a surprise visit to see Jordan, and Charlie discovers their relationship. Nolan has a visit from Kwame, an African man whom he sponsored through a hunger relief fund when they were both 8 years old. Kwame has become highly successful, and, seeing Nolan's living conditions, offers to return his generosity.
78	68	"Charlie Gets Between Sean and Jordan"	Bob Koherr	Dave Caplan	August 18, 2014	2079	0.54
Jordan mentions to Charlie that she may have to break up with Sean. Meanwhile, Charlie is trying to convince an APA rep named Susie to make him and Jordan the keynote speakers at an upcoming convention. Charlie tells Sean that Jordan plans to break up with him and, learning that Susie is smitten with Sean, Charlie sets them up together to close the keynote deal. But Jordan finds out what Charlie has done and sabotages their speech on successful working partnerships. Lacey has set up a "hot Indian girl in a coma" live Web feed and is receiving lots of "donations", and the gang try to persuade her it's unethical.
79	69	"Charlie Does Times With the Hot Warden"	Bob Koherr	Shauna McGarry	August 25, 2014	2081	0.53
Charlie learns that his anger therapy sessions at the prison are to be cut, and when he goes to complain, he finds that the warden has been replaced by a woman, Warden Hartley (Elaine Hendrix). Hartley plans to run for state attorney general, and thinks that allowing hardened criminals to talk about their feelings will not appeal to her supporters. Fearing their prisoner re-entry program might also be cut, Jordan urges Charlie to resist sleeping with Hartley. Nolan is doing well in his new job as a limo driver, and offers to take Lacey, Patrick and Ed for a ride. He gets a call to pick up his client, Quinn (Ethan Erickson), who falls for Lacey, which upsets Nolan, especially when he later drives them on a date.
80	70	"Charlie & The Warden's Dirty Secret"	Bob Koherr	Renée Estevez	August 25, 2014	2082	0.45
Nolan wins a free phone, which the others want too. But it turns out to be a sting operation for unpaid parking tickets. Charlie learns from Warden Hartley that she once did a porn scene, and wants to try to use this to get his group financed again. But after having told the prisoners, Hartley tells him that as long as her secret is safe, the group will be financed. So Charlie has to fulfill the prisoners' wishes in order to keep them quiet. In taking care of Dr. Randy's wish list, Charlie inadvertently helps him in an escape attempt.
81	71	"Charlie and the Temper of Doom"	Bob Koherr	Bob Kushell	September 1, 2014	2084	0.62
After having firebombed a garbage truck, Charlie is suspended as a therapist and has to attend anger management therapy himself. While at his session, he meets a hot woman named Jane whom he can only date if he can convince her he has no anger problem. Jordan pays some people to make Charlie angry, hoping to convince him that he needs to take his therapy seriously. This gets Charlie in trouble with a man from the APA Ethics committee, whom he assumes is one of Jordan's plants. In the end, they all attend an anger management session. Note: This story-line follows on from the episode 'Charlie Gets Trashed' which was aired after this episode.
82	72	"Charlie Gets Trashed"	Bob Koherr; Steve Zuckerman	Renée Estevez	September 1, 2014	2080	0.50
Charlie’s garbage man Jimmy (Will Sasso) dumps trash in front of Charlie’s house because he overfilled. This starts a war between them, with Charlie going out with Jimmy's ex-girlfriend (Arden Myrin), Jimmy dumping a truckload of trash in front of Charlie’s house and Charlie then throwing a firebomb into the garbage truck. Meanwhile, Lacey and Nolan compete to become the new building manager in order to live rent-free. After Lacey gets the job, Nolan finds another way to make money. Note: This story-line precedes that in the episode 'Charlie and the Temper of Doom' which was aired before this episode.
83	73	"Charlie and the Case of the Curious Hottie"	Bob Koherr	Dave Caplan	September 8, 2014	2083	0.49
While Charlie is being harassed by Warden Hartley, Sean and Jordan are thinking of moving in together. To find out if she can trust Sean, Jordan hires a private investigator to follow him. Assuming the hot female P.I. was hired by the Warden to go after him, Charlie pays the P.I. more to spy on "her employer", thinking it’s the Warden. The P.I. finds out that Jordan steals a lot of office supplies, which causes the Warden to fire Jordan. Charlie finds a loophole to help Jordan keep her job, by pretending she's a heroin addict. Meanwhile, Nolan sublets his apartment to make some extra cash, and lives in his limo for eight days. When Lacey can't stand the noise the new tenant makes, she moves into the limo with Nolan.
84	74	"Charlie Pledges a Sorority Sister"	Bob Koherr	Andy Roth & Corinne Stikeman	September 8, 2014	2085	0.44
Lacey is dating Tiffer, a music producer, who plans to take her to the MTV Video Music Awards. Patrick discovers Tiffer is cheating, but hides it from Lacey so that the two will wear clothes he designed on the red carpet. But Nolan blabs and Lacey takes her revenge. Charlie meets Kelly, Jordan's sorority sister who claims no man has ever dumped her and rubs it in with Jordan every time she is dumped. So Jordan plots to have Charlie sleep with Kelly, expecting he'll never call her again. Sean tells Charlie about Jordan's plan, so to annoy Jordan he pretends he wants to keep seeing Kelly, but she is so annoying that Charlie tries to make her dump him.
85	75	"Charlie Plays Hide and Go Cheat"	Bob Koherr	Dave Caplan	November 3, 2014	2086	0.55
Charlie is dating Maggie, the P.I., and she makes a bet with Charlie that he cannot cheat on her without her catching him. He will win the bet if he sends her a cell phone photo with a girl in a hotel room at 8:00 PM the next day, before Maggie finds him. Charlie wins the bet, with Jordan's unwitting and unwilling help, but Maggie then breaks up with Charlie because...well, he's too good at cheating. Nolan enrolls in the same art class as Patrick after learning that Lacey will be posing nude for the group, with a surprising result.
86	76	"Charlie & the Revenge of the Hot Nerd"	Bob Koherr	Bob Kushell	November 3, 2014	2087	0.49
Charlie is again dating Monica (Nicole Travolta), the hot nerd whose jealous ex-boyfriend used technology to upend Charlie's life before [in Episode 2/26]. But he becomes alarmed after Monica hacks into his various internet accounts and his phone. At the prison, a renowned hacker named Vlad gives him a program to take back control of his accounts, but Monica is upset he didn't just tell her. Lacey schemes to get back at another girl who "stole her idea" of targeting rich men to date, and sets up the girl with Ed by lying about Ed being wealthy.
87	77	"Charlie and the Curse of the Flying Fist"	Bob Koherr	Daniel Dratch	November 10, 2014	2089	0.51
When Nolan complains about being bullied at work, Charlie advises him how to be more assertive and sets up a ruse where he confronts Nolan's boss, and Nolan has to step in with fake threats. It works and Nolan gains the respect of his coworkers, but he acts the same way with Charlie and the group, leaving Charlie to look for a way to calm him down. Sean and Jordan spice up their sex life with role playing, but Sean is taken aback when one of Jordan's fantasies is of the two being married with children.
88	78	"Charlie and the Houseful of Hookers"	Steve Zuckerman	Dave Caplan	November 10, 2014	2070	0.44
Sasha tells Charlie she has opened a halfway house for hookers trying to get out of the life, but when the home isn't ready, she pleads with Charlie to open his house to the hookers for a few days. Things go awry when Sean convinces Charlie that a band playing in a local club is the Rolling Stones performing under a pseudonym, and Charlie leaves Jordan in charge so he can join Sean.
89	79	"Charlie Gets Patrick High"	Bob Koherr	Eric Weinberg	November 17, 2014	2088	0.73
When Patrick discloses that he will not be attending his job interview with Vogue, Charlie suspects it is because incidents in his childhood have damaged his self-confidence, so, with help from Jordan and Nolan, he makes various attempts to get Patrick to confront his fears. For their different reasons, Ed and Lacey collaborate to find someone on the internet who will accept money to beat up Sean.
90	80	"Charlie and Lacey Go For Broke"	Bob Koherr	Kimberly Altamirano	November 17, 2014	2090	0.67
Charlie wants a broke Lacey to learn how to get by on her own, so he persuades her father to tell Lacey that he has lost most of his money on bad investments. Instead of looking for a job, Lacey soon announces she is engaged to Dudley (Gilbert Gottfried), a rich older man. So Charlie has to convince Dudley to break up with Lacey. A distraught Lacey decides she will try to support herself. Sean is managing another strip club, and offers Nolan a cash reward for any limo customers he can talk into going there.
91	81	"Charlie & the Terrible, Horrible, No Good Very Bad Thanksgiving"	Bob Koherr	Michael Loftus	November 24, 2014	2091	0.66
As they all expect to spend Thanksgiving alone, Charlie invites his group to Thanksgiving dinner at his house. Ed is sad that his wife Dorothy won't take him back, so Charlie secretly invites her to dinner, having persuaded her to give Ed another chance. But Ed shows up on Thanksgiving Day with another woman. Jordan is convinced Sean is cheating on her with the strippers at his club, so she flirts with Nolan to make Sean jealous, but Lacey also gets jealous when she sees that Nolan is no longer fixated on her.
92	82	"Charlie Rolls the Dice in Vegas"	Bob Koherr	Ron Rappaport	November 24, 2014	2092	0.59
Sasha shows up as Sean and Charlie are about to go on a "guy's weekend" in Las Vegas. Charlie persuades Sean to let her tag along, and on arrival they find she has invited a bevy of her hooker friends. After a wild night of partying, Charlie and Sasha discover they got married. Charlie says he rather likes the idea of living with Sasha, and they agree to try it, but his attitude changes when Sasha's mother and brother visit. Lacey gets impatient with Nolan who insists on dating and getting to know each other better before they have sex.
93	83	"Charlie & the Return of the Danger Girl"	Bob Koherr	Kristy Grant	December 1, 2014	2093	0.53
Charlie is dating an adrenaline junkie who wants him to join her on a sky dive, but he is reluctant because he previously witnessed one which went bad. After Jordan fails to help him, Nolan reveals he is a very experienced sky diver and knows a technique to cure Charlie's fears. Lacey decides she will use her father's money to start a high-end shoe business, and she chooses Patrick as her lead designer, but they have problems getting the shoes manufactured.
94	84	"Charlie Gets in Bed With Jordan's Ex"	Bob Koherr	Dave Caplan	December 1, 2014	2094	0.42
Charlie gets an offer to franchise the prisoner re-entry clinic to other correction facilities around the country, but when he learns that the investor is Jordan's ex-husband, he decides he will keep that from her to make sure she agrees to the deal. Nolan resolves to save the tavern's tree from being cut down after seeing it has a hummingbird nest with eggs in it, so he chains himself to the tree and refuses to leave, even when Lacey tells him that he must choose between her and the bird.
95	85	"Charlie's Living the Dream"	Bob Koherr	Bruce Helford	December 8, 2014	2095	0.60
After going out drinking with Sean, Charlie misses the rehearsal for Ed and Dottie's marriage renewal vows, so Ed is skeptical that Charlie will make it to the ceremony the next day. Charlie promises to be there, but still goes out partying with Sean and two girls until 5 A.M. He falls asleep and has a vivid dream, in which he realizes he is having a dream, and must wake himself up to get to the ceremony. At the prison, Wayne tells Jordan that he overheard Ernesto and Cleo planning a riot, but after Jordan calls in armed security, she finds out that Wayne has duped her.
96	86	"Charlie Meets his Match"	Bob Koherr	Bob Kushell	December 8, 2014	2096	0.57
Charlie is dating a woman who runs an online matchmaking service, but they agree that it's not serious and call it off, so she offers to match Charlie and Sean with two other women. Shortly into their dates, Charlie finds out their matches were accidentally reversed and wants to swap, but Sean doesn't want to. Jordan jumps at the chance to play Juliet in a prison production of Romeo and Juliet but soon begins to regret it.
97	87	"Charlie and The Epic Relationship Fail"	Bob Koherr	Andrew Roth & Corinne Stikeman	December 15, 2014	2097	0.57
Ed invites Sean to make up the numbers for his regular poker game, but after Sean loses big having been targeted as a "mark" by the rest of the players, he agrees to join them in making Patrick their next target. Lacey tells Charlie she is tiring of her relationship with Nolan because of his lack of ambition, so Charlie convinces Nolan to ask for a raise at work, and although his approach gets him fired, Lacey is impressed.
98	88	"Charlie Gets Tied Up with A Catholic Girl"	Bob Koherr	Bob Kushell	December 15, 2014	2099	0.46
Lacey pretends to be pregnant in order to scam her rich grandmother, who has promised a priceless ring to her first great-grandchild. But Lacey's sister Sateen appears to be one step (and a few months) ahead of her. Meanwhile, Martin has met a new woman named Joanne (Cheryl Ladd), and wants her to meet Charlie. Martin forbids Charlie from making advances on Joanne's "good Catholic daughter" Mary Kathleen (Izabella Miko), which puts Charlie in distress when Mary Kathleen tries to seduce him.
99	89	"Charlie and the Sexy Swing Vote"	Bob Koherr	Dave Caplan	December 22, 2014	2098	0.79
Wanting an assistant who can also help settle their many disagreements, Charlie and Jordan hire Brianne (Emily Montague). Although she had secretly promised Charlie always to side with him, Brianne starts to side with Jordan, so Charlie sets it up for Jordan to see Brianne with Sean, prompting Jordan to fire Brianne. This ends up bringing Sean and Jordan back together. Nolan gives up pot smoking to get on the good side of Lacey's parents, and without his daily weed, he becomes a compulsive cleaner with a bundle of energy, but Lacey doesn't like this new Nolan.
100	90	"Charlie & The 100th Episode"	Bob Koherr	Bruce Helford & Dave Caplan & Bob Kushell	December 22, 2014	2100	0.72
Jordan tells Charlie he is stifling his therapy group's progress by always intervening when they need help. At the same time, Charlie has an opportunity to work for his old baseball team when they hire a new general manager (Corbin Bernsen) who wants Charlie to serve as the team psychologist. Charlie takes the job and things soon go awry. His therapy group tries to keep him from leaving, Nolan gets arrested, and Jordan becomes overwhelmed at the prison after the state commutes the sentences of a thousand inmates. Charlie finds that the baseball job is not what he expected, while also realizing he needs his therapy patients as much as they need him. Charlie returns to his familiar chair, surrounded by the group, as he asks who wants to go first.
