= Ben Rimalower =

American dramatist

- Born: May 12, 1976 (age 50)
- Education: University of California, Berkeley
- Occupations: Theatre director; writer; producer; performer
- Notable work: Patti Issues
- Website: benrimalower.com

Ben Rimalower (born May 12, 1976) is an American theatre director, writer, producer, and performer. He is best known for writing and performing the critically acclaimed long-running hit off Off-Broadway solo play Patti Issues. He is also a contributing writer for Playbill.com and The Huffington Post. Rimalower is gay.

Rimalower founded the University of California, Berkeley's student-run theatre organization, BareStage Productions, in 1995 while he was a student at the school.

In 2004, Rimalower directed a concert production of Snoopy! The Musical to benefit the Pied Piper Children's Theatre of New York City. The concert featured Sutton Foster as Peppermint Patty, Deven May as Charlie Brown, Ann Harada as Lucy, Jennifer Cody as Sally, Hunter Foster as Linus, and Christian Borle in the title role.

He produced and directed the New York premiere of John Fisher's Joy at the Producers Club and later, Off-Broadway at the Actors' Playhouse in 2005.

Rimalower conceived and directed Leslie Kritzer in Leslie Kritzer is Patti LuPone at Les Mouches, a recreation of Patti LuPone's famed nightclub act, which premiered in New York at Joe's Pub and also played in San Francisco at the Plush Room in 2006 and 2007. Rimalower received a Special Time Out New York Award for the production.

In 2007, he directed an Off-Broadway production of Marissa Kamin's The Fabulous Life of a Size Zero, starring Gillian Jacobs and Anna Chlumsky, at the Daryl Roth/DR2 Theatre.

He has directed solo shows for many artists including Lindsey Alley, Cole Escola, Lance Horne, John Hill, Natalie Joy Johnson, Erin Markey, Scott Nevins and Molly Pope.

In August 2012, Rimalower's solo play Patti Issues premiered at the Duplex, directed by Aaron Mark, and has since received a 2013 Bistro Award ("Best Solo Play") and a 2013 MAC Award ("New York Debut - Male"). The production was extended numerous times, running well into 2013 and playing engagements in several other cities including Los Angeles, San Francisco, Berkeley, San Diego, Chicago, Provincetown, Boston, and Fire Island Pines, as well as engagements in Berlin and Glasgow. In September 2013, Rimalower gave his final performance in the play in New York City. Tony Award nominee Robin de Jesús replaced him in the role for a limited run.
