= Collaborative Arts Project 21 =

New York City professional musical theatre training conservatory

Collaborative Arts Project 21, known more commonly as CAP21, is a New York City professional musical theatre training conservatory and off-Broadway theatre company. It has a core faculty with many associate faculty who are also working professionals. The conservatory has produced many Broadway performers, as well as actors in off-Broadway, regional, and international theatre, television, film, and other performance media. Until 2012, it was in partnership with the New York University’s Tisch School of the Arts. In 2014, CAP21 joined forces with Molloy University.

== History ==
As a producing organization, CAP21 began in 1994. Its productions take place at CAP21 or at venues in New York City and around the United States. Each season, three new works are produced for a two-week “work in progress” run. In addition, CAP21 works in development with 20 new musicals and plays providing public and in-house readings. CAP21's season features diverse productions of new and classic plays and musicals, drawing audiences from the greater New York metropolitan area. Nearly 200 theatre artists are engaged each year to create and present new and classic works.

In 2012, the CAP21 Theatre Company won a GLAAD award for Outstanding New York Theatre: Off and off-off Broadway, for its production of the new musical Southern Comfort. The production starred Jeffrey Kuhn and Natalie Joy Johnson. Some faculty include: Lori Leshner, Lawrence Arancio, Sean Dougherty, Jillian Carucci, and Chris O'Connor, the chair of the program (https://www.molloy.edu/academics/undergraduate-programs/molloy-cap21-theatre-arts-program/faculty-profiles).

== Alumni ==
Well-known performers who have been part of the CAP21 theatre group include Lady Gaga, Alex Brightman, Adam Jacobs, Javier Muñoz, Jason Tam, Ali Stroker, Matthew Morrison, Kristen Bell, Julie Benko, Shaina Taub, Sosie Bacon, Nichelle Lewis (The Wiz, Hairspray), Jenna Rose Husli (Teeth (musical)), Diego Enrico (The Book of Mormon), Rodney Ingram (Aladdin, The Phantom of the Opera), and Jack Roden (Parade).
