= Natalie Joy Johnson =

American actress (born 1978)

- Born: May 24, 1978 (age 48); Baltimore, Maryland
- Education: Mary Washington College (BA)
- Occupations: Actress; singer; dancer
- Website: nataliejoyjohnson.live

Natalie Joy Johnson (born May 24, 1978) is an American actress.

== Early life and education ==
Johnson was born in Baltimore, Maryland. She attended Mount Hebron High School in Ellicott City, Maryland, and earned a Bachelor of Arts degree in theatre from Mary Washington College.

== Career ==
In 2006, Johnson made her solo cabaret debut at Joe's Pub in a concert directed by Ben Rimalower.

In 2008 she appeared in a national commercial for Bank of America.

Johnson originated the role of Enid Hoopes in Legally Blonde and in 2008 performed as Paulette in the national tour of Legally Blonde. Some of her off Broadway roles include Sinéad in But I'm a Cheerleader and Nadia in bare: a pop opera. Johnson joined the Broadway production of Kinky Boots on December 23, 2013, in the role of Pat.

In 2010, she appeared in the film When in Rome.

== Stage ==
Theatre credits
| Year | Title | Role(s) | Venue | Refs. |
|---|---|---|---|---|
| 2004 | Bare: A Pop Opera | Nadia | American Theater of Actors, Off-Broadway | |
| 2005 | But I'm A Cheerleader: The Musical | performer | New York Musical Theatre Festival | |
| 2006 | Cinderella | Portia | North Shore Music Theatre, Massachusetts | |
| 2006 | How to Save the World and Find True Love in 90 Minutes | Greek chorus | New World Stages, Off-Broadway | |
| 2007 | Legally Blonde: The Musical | Enid | Golden Gate Theatre, San Francisco | |
| 2007 | Legally Blonde: The Musical | Veronica, Enid | Palace Theatre, Broadway | |
| 2008 | Legally Blonde: The Musical | Paulette | North American tour | |
| 2011 | Crazy For You | Irene | Cape Playhouse, Massachusetts | |
| 2011 | Southern Comfort | Cori | CAP21, Off-Broadway | |
| 2013 | Silence! The Musical | performer | Elektra Theatre, Off-Broadway | |
| 2013 | Kinky Boots | Pat | Al Hirschfeld Theatre, Broadway | |
| 2018 | Lempicka | Suzy Solidor | Williamstown Theatre Festival, Massachusetts | |
| 2022 | Lempicka | Suzy Solidor | La Jolla Playhouse, San Diego | |
| 2024 | Lempicka | Suzy Solidor | Longacre Theatre, Broadway | |
| 2024 | Next to Normal | Diana | Barrington Stage Company, Massachusetts | |
| 2026 | Oh, Mary! | understudy Mary Todd Lincoln, Mary's Chaperone | US national tour | |
