= John Hill (actor) =

American musical theater actor (born 1978)

- Born: John Arthur Hill; October 23, 1978 (age 47); San Antonio, Texas, US
- Occupations: Actor, producer
- Years active: 1990–present

John Arthur Hill (born October 23, 1978) is an American musical theater actor and television producer who is most well known for playing Jason McConnell in the off-Broadway run of Bare: A Pop Opera and for being a producer on Watch What Happens Live with Andy Cohen. He also developed a following on his former website, John Hill Online, with his comedy video series entitled "Johnny and Kooks" made with his friend Katharine Leonard. The pair released a single on iTunes entitled "About You". He grew up in San Antonio, Texas and currently resides in Los Angeles, California.

== Career ==
=== Theater ===
Hill has appeared in the Broadway musicals Hairspray (in the original Broadway cast as Fender) and The Boy from Oz (in the original Broadway cast as Mark Herron). In The Boy from Oz, he also understudied the roles of Greg and the lead role of Peter Allen, though he never went on as Peter Allen. In Hairspray, he also understudied the roles of Link Larkin and Corny Collins; he did go on as Link Larkin. He starred opposite Michael Arden and Jenna Leigh Green in the original off-Broadway cast of Bare: A Pop Opera in the leading role of Jason. He was set to return to the role when the show was going to move to a new theater after a few months on break, but the move never happened; a demo of 11 tracks from this production was recorded, but the remaining tracks were never recorded when the production did not resume. Along with most of the cast, he appeared in the "Bare's Back Concert" after the show closed. He also appeared in the musical adaptation of But I'm A Cheerleader at the New York Musical Theatre Festival in 2005. In June 2006, he wrote and performed the solo show Skinny Corpse at in Manhattan, directed by Ben Rimalower. He also took part in the mini-musical Prop 8: The Musical.

=== Television ===
In 2007, he produced an 8-part documentary for MTV called Show Choir. This program followed the IMAGES choir of Morgantown High School in West Virginia and its members.

Hill has also served as producer for Dance on Sunset, Tori and Dean, The D-List, All About Aubrey, Project Runway, Top Chef, and Attack of the Show!.

He was the co-executive producer and writer as well as an on-camera panelist on the Bravo show The Approval Matrix, based on the feature in New York. In 2011, Hill was executive producer of the Logo spinoff The A-List: Dallas.

Hill is a producer on Watch What Happens Live with Andy Cohen and host of The Feels on Radio Andy, Andy Cohen's SiriusXM Channel. He also wrote for Love Connection on FOX, where Cohen served as host.

== Personal life ==
Hill is gay. He was previously in a relationship with his Radio Andy co-host Andy Cohen.

== Recordings ==
- "About You" by Johnny and Kooks
- Hairspray cast recording (as Fender)
- The Boy from Oz original Broadway cast recording (as Mark Herron)
- Bare: A Pop Opera original cast demo recording
- But I'm A Cheerleader demo recording
