= Easter Rising (musical) =

- The Musical
- Music: Michael Arden
- Lyrics: Michael Arden
- Book: Isaac Oliver
- Productions: 2004 Joe's Pub

Easter Rising is a musical written by Isaac Oliver with a score by Michael Arden. Set in Plano, Texas, this "four person song cycle questions the limits of love, definition of family and the morals we pass on to our children when our own are in debate".

The show deals with the last few weeks of the life of Caleb. As his battle with terminal cancer draws toward a close, Caleb confronts buried relationships with his estranged childhood friend, Andrew, his teenage son, John, and his love for his fiancé, April.

== Production ==
On December 21, 2004, two concert readings of the musical, directed by Kristen Hanggi, premiered at the Public Theatre at Joe's Pub. The cast featured Colin Hanlon as Andrew, Michael Arden as John, Steven Pasquale as Caleb, and Kerry Butler as April.

On January 10, 2011, David Tarlow and Christopher Sepulveda presented a workshop reading of an updated version of Easter Rising by Michael Arden, directed by Coy Middlebrook and musically directed by Jonnah Speidel, at Theatre at Boston Court in Pasadena, California. The cast featured Colin Hanlon as Andrew, Steve Kazee as Caleb, Grant Gustin as John, Ben Platt as Young Andrew, Max Sheldon as Young Caleb and Melissa van der Schyff as April.
