= Claudia Kariuki =

British actress, singer, dancer and songwriter

Claudia Kariuki is a British actress, singer, dancer and songwriter who is best known for playing Jane Seymour in Six in the West End.

== Early life and education ==
Kariuki studied musical theatre at Mountview Academy of Theatre Arts in London.

== Stage ==
Kariuki made their professional debut as Sarah in Ragtime at Regent's Park Open Air Theatre in 2012.

In 2014 they performed as Motormouth Maybelle in Hairspray at Leicester's Curve theatre, reprising the role after having performed it on the touring production of the show in 2013.

In October 2020 they joined the concert of Sunset Boulevard at Alexandra Palace. The show was led by Mazz Murray as Norma Desmond, Kayi Ushe as Joe Gillis, Sharif Afifi as Artie Green and Zizi Strallen as Betty Schaefer.

Kariuki returned in her role of one of the Divas in the musical Priscilla, Queen of the Desert for its UK and Ireland tour in 2021. The three main roles were played by Miles Western (Bernadette), Nick Hayes (Adam/Felicia) and Edwin Ray (Tick/Mitzi) and the show was produced by Jason Donovan.

In October 2021 a new cast for the musical Six was announced, with Kariuki taking the role of Jane Seymour. Amy Di Bartolomeo was Catherine of Aragon, Amanda Lindgren was Anne Boleyn, Dionne Ward-Anderson was Anna of Cleves, Tsemaye Bob-Egbe was Katherine Howard and Meesha Turner was Catherine Parr. The show has won several awards in both the UK and the US and has also started running in Australia and several cruise ship productions. In March 2022 Six celebrated it 1000th performance in the West End.

Kariuki joined the cast of the West End revival of the musical Sister Act as Michelle and also as first cover for the lead character of Deloris Van Cartier. In the cast Beverley Knight in the role of Deloris, Ruth Jones as Mother Superior, Lesley Joseph as Sister Mary Lazarus, Lemar as Curtis, Clive Rowe as Eddie and Lizzie Bea as Sister Mary Robert.

Kariuki joined the cast of the European premiere of Shucked in the Ensemble, where she also covered the role of Lulu. It played a one-month run at Regent's Park Open Air Theatre from May 10 until June 14, 2025.

== Personal life ==
Kariuki is non-binary, and uses they/she pronouns.

== Theatre credits ==
Year	Production	Role	Location
2012	Ragtime	Sarah	Regent's Park Open Air Theatre
2012	Sweet Smell of Success	Ensemble	Arcola Theatre
2013	Hairspray	Ensemble/ understudy Motormouth Maybelle/ Dynamite	UK & Ireland Tour
2013	Bare: The Musical	Sister Chantelle	Greenwich Theatre
2014	Hairspray	Motormouth Maybelle	Curve
2014	Sister Act	Deloris Van Cartier	National Opera House of Ireland
2014	Porgy & Bess	Ensemble/ understudy Clara	Regent's Park Open Air Theatre
2014-2015	Ghost the Musical	Oda Mae Brown	English Theatre Frankfurt
2015	Edges	Woman 2	London Theatre Workshop
2015	The Life	Sonja	English Theatre Frankfurt
2016-2018	Wicked	Ensemble/ Midwife/ understudy Madame Morrible	Apollo Victoria Theatre
2018-2019	School of Rock	Ms. Sheinkopf/understudy Rosalie Mullins	Gillian Lynne Theatre
2019-2020	Priscilla, Queen of the Desert	Diva	UK and Ireland Tour
2021-2023	Six	Jane Seymour	Vaudeville Theatre
2024	Bare: The Musical	Sister Chantelle	London Palladium
2024	Sister Act	Michelle/ 1st cover Deloris Van Cartier	Dominion Theatre
2025	Shucked	Ensemble/cover Lulu	Regent's Park Open Air Theatre

== Awards and nominations ==
Year	Work	Award	Category	Result
2023	Six	Black British Theatre Awards	Best Non Binary Performer in a Musical	Won
2024		Black British Theatre Awards	Best Non Binary Performer	Won
