= Michael Arden =

American actor, singer, and stage director (born 1982)

- Arden in 2026
- Born: Michael Jerrod Moore; October 6, 1982 (age 44); Midland, Texas, U.S.
- Education: Juilliard School (attended)
- Occupations: Actor; theatre director; singer
- Years active: 2003–present
- Spouse: Andy Mientus (m. 2016)

Michael Jerrod Moore (born October 6, 1982), known professionally as Michael Arden, is an American actor and theatre director. Arden has received two Tony Awards for Best Direction of a Musical, winning for the revival of the musical Parade in 2023 and Maybe Happy Ending in 2025.

== Early life ==
Arden described his upbringing as "rocky." He was born to a very young mother who struggled with drugs and alcohol and his father died by suicide when Arden was around 2 years old. Arden went on to live with his grandparents, Pat and Jim Moore, in Midland, Texas from the 5th grade onwards. Starting in the 5th grade, he was a student at Trinity School, a college preparatory school in Midland. He was bullied in his youth for being gay.

Arden's interest in acting began when he was four years old and his grandparents took him to see Sesame Street Live. He was active in the Pickwick Players, Midland Community Theatre's youth performing company. He also built theatrical sets in his grandparents' garage. A Presidential Scholar in the arts, he received a scholarship to Interlochen Arts Academy as a theater student, where he graduated in 2001. He was accepted on a full scholarship to the Juilliard School, where he was in the Drama Division's Group 34 (2001–2005). He left Juilliard in 2003 to join the Broadway revival company of the musical Big River.

== Career ==
=== Theatre ===
Arden made his Broadway debut as Tom Sawyer in the 2003 Roundabout and Deaf West revival of Big River. He also starred opposite John Hill in the 2004 off-Broadway show Bare, a Pop Opera. In summer 2005, he played Nick, a sexually promiscuous gay man in love with a shark, in Adam Bock's surreal play Swimming in the Shallows at New York's Second Stage Theatre. He played the title character in Pippin for the World AIDS Day Broadway benefit concert in November 2004. He starred in the Twyla Tharp musical The Times They Are A-Changin', based on the music of Bob Dylan, which ran January 25 to March 5, 2006, at the Old Globe Theatre in San Diego, California, and then on Broadway at the Brooks Atkinson Theatre from October 26 to November 19, 2006.

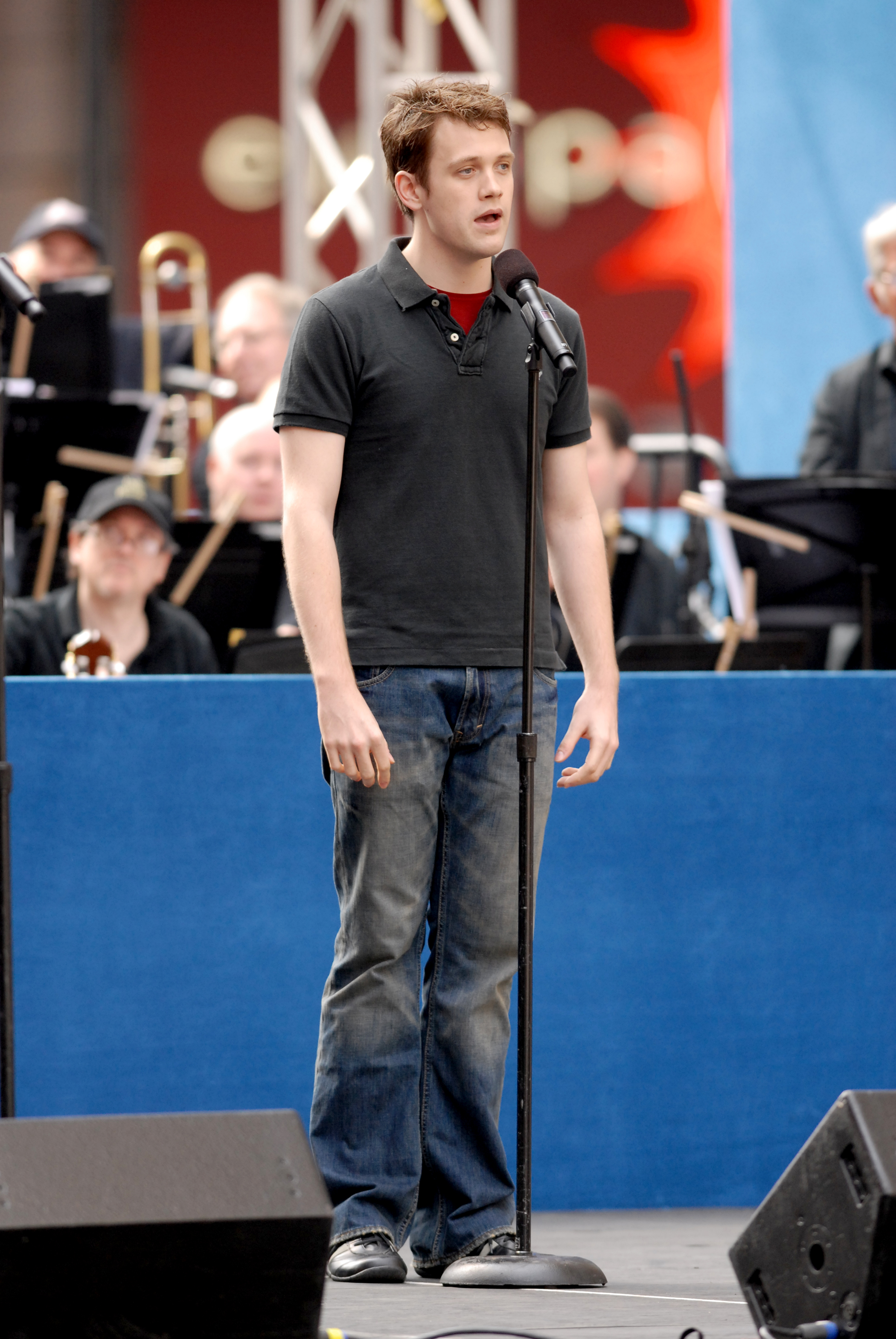
Arden performing with the cast of The Times They Are a-Changin' in 2006 at a Broadway on Broadway concert.

In 2007 he starred as John Robert in Ace at the Old Globe Theatre from January 13 to February 18. In the summer of 2007, he toured Europe with Barbra Streisand as one of her "Broadway Boys." From July to September 2010, he played the lead role in a revival of Andrew Lloyd Webber's Aspects of Love at the Menier Chocolate Factory in London.

Arden's regional theatre credits include Pippin, God of Vengeance, Falsettoland, Tom Jones' Harold and Maude, West Side Story, Songs for a New World, The Common Pursuit, and The Winter's Tale.

Beginning in October 2014, Arden played the role of Quasimodo in The Hunchback of Notre Dame musical at San Diego's La Jolla Playhouse. The production ran from October 26 to December 7, 2014, and at Paper Mill Playhouse from March 4 to April 5, 2015.

Arden directed Deaf West Theatre's acclaimed Broadway revival of Spring Awakening. The production featured a cast made up of both deaf and hearing actors, performed simultaneously in American Sign Language and English. The production began in at Inner City Arts in Los Angeles in September 2014, transferred to the Wallis Annenberg Center in Beverly Hills in May 2015, and finally transferred to Broadway, where it began previews September 8, 2015, and opened on September 27, 2015, at the Brooks Atkinson Theatre. On May 3, 2016, Arden received a nomination for the Tony Award for Best Direction of a Musical for his work on the Spring Awakening revival.

Arden went on to direct the musical My Fair Lady at the Bay Street Theater in Sag Harbor, New York in August 2016. He then returned as the first artist-in-residence at the Wallis Annenberg Center, where he directed productions of The Pride and Merrily We Roll Along, the latter of which earned him a 2017 Ovation Awards nomination for Best Director of a Musical.

Arden directed the first Broadway revival of Once on This Island, which began previews on November 9, 2017, and opened on December 3 at the Circle in the Square Theatre, where it ran until January 6, 2019. The acclaimed revival was nominated for seven Drama Desk Awards and eight Tony Awards, including a second Best Director Tony nomination for Arden.

Arden directed Annie at the Hollywood Bowl in July 2018 for the venue's annual summer musical production. Following this, Arden directed Jefferson Mays in his one-man adaptation of Charles Dickens' A Christmas Carol at Los Angeles' Geffen Playhouse beginning October 2018. Arden directed the American premiere of Maybe Happy Ending at the Alliance Theatre in Atlanta in January 2020. In November 2022, Arden directed a production of Jason Robert Brown's Parade for New York City Center's 2022 gala. The production transferred to Broadway in March 2023 and won Arden the 2023 Tony Award for Best Direction of a Musical. Arden directed the Broadway premiere of Maybe Happy Ending, which opened in fall 2024 at the Belasco Theatre. He won a Tony Award for Best Director for the show.

=== Television ===
He has appeared on ABC's Grey's Anatomy (in the episode "17 Seconds" as Neal Hannigan) and in NUMB3RS for CBS. He was cast in the Fox show The Return of Jezebel James, which cancelled after three episodes in the spring of 2008. Arden had a recurring role in the NBC series Kings as Joseph. He also guest starred in an episode of The Closer as well as guest starring in an episode of Bones. In August 2011, Arden was cast in a recurring role on The Good Wife. He had a regular role in the FX series Anger Management.

=== Film ===
Arden featured in Colin Spoelman's independent film The Cave Movie (2009). He also acted in the 2011 movie Source Code, and appeared as Kevin in the film Bride Wars.

=== Composing and writing ===
As a composer, Arden has written several works, including Easter Rising, As You Like It, and Ripley.

== Personal life ==
Arden is gay. He got engaged to fellow actor Andy Mientus on June 23, 2014. He and Mientus had both planned proposals to each other the same day without the other knowing. They married on August 18, 2016, at Babington House, Somerset, England. They have been together since 2010. The two first met in 2006 during the opening night party of the Broadway show The Times They Are-a-Changin', in which Arden was a performer.

== Theater credits ==
Acting
Year	Production	Role	Category
2003	Big River	Tom Sawyer	Broadway
2004	Bare	Peter	Off-Broadway
2004	Pippin	Pippin	New York (concert)
2005	Pippin	Pippin	Regional (concert)
2005	Swimming in the Shallows	Nick	Off-Broadway
2005	The Secret Garden	Dickon	New York (concert)
2006	The Times They Are A-Changin'	Coyote	Regional
2006	The Times They Are A-Changin'	Coyote	Broadway
2007	Ace	John Robert	Regional
2010	Aspects of Love	Alex Dillingham	Off-West End
2013	Ragtime	Younger Brother	New York (concert)
2014–2015	The Hunchback of Notre Dame	Quasimodo	Regional
2019	King Lear	Aide to Cornwall	Broadway

Production
Year	Production	Credit	Category
2008	A Tale of Two Cities	Assistant Director	Broadway
2014–2015	Spring Awakening	Director	Deaf West Theatre, Los Angeles
2015–2016	Spring Awakening	Director	Broadway
2016	My Fair Lady	Director	Bay Street Theatre
2016	Merrily We Roll Along	Director	Wallis Annenberg Center for the Performing Arts, Los Angeles
2017	The Pride	Director	Wallis Annenberg Center for the Performing Arts, Los Angeles
2017–2019	Once on This Island	Director	Broadway
2018	Annie	Director	Hollywood Bowl, Los Angeles
2018	A Christmas Carol	Director & Adaptor	Geffen Playhouse, Los Angeles
2019-2020	Once on This Island	Director	US Tour
2020	Maybe Happy Ending	Director	Alliance Theatre, Atlanta
2020	Joseph and the Amazing Technicolor Dreamcoat	Director	David Geffen Hall
2022	Guys and Dolls	Director	Tokyo, Japan
2022	Parade	Director	New York City Center
2022–2023	A Christmas Carol	Director & Adaptor	Broadway
2023	Parade	Director & Producer	Broadway
2024	The Queen of Versailles	Director	Emerson Colonial Theatre, Boston
2024	The Roommate	Co-Producer	Broadway
2024-2025	Sunset Boulevard	Co-Producer	Broadway
2024-2025	Maybe Happy Ending	Director & Co-Producer	Broadway
2025	Parade	Director	US Tour
2025	The Queen of Versailles	Director	Broadway
2026	The Lost Boys	Director & Lighting Designer	Broadway

== Filmography ==
=== Film ===
Year	Title	Role	Notes
2006	The Good Shepherd	Pinafore Actor	
2009	Bride Wars	Kevin	
2009	The Cave Movie	Sam	
2011	Nurse Jackée	Gabe	Short film
2011	Source Code	Derek Frost	
2012	The Odd Life of Timothy Green	Doug Wert	
2016	So B. It	Elliot	

=== Television ===
Year	Title	Role	Notes
2006	Numb3rs	Whitley	Episode: "Backscatter"
2006	Grey's Anatomy	Neal Hannigan	Episode: "17 Seconds"
2008	Cashmere Mafia	Denis	Episode: "Dog Eat Dog"
2008	The Return of Jezebel James	Buddy	3 episodes
2009	Bones	Harold Prescott	Episode: "The Bond in the Boot"
2009	The Closer	James Clark	Episode: "Identity Theft"
2009	Kings	Joseph Lasile	3 episodes
2010	The Forgotten	James Poole	Episode: "Mama Jane"
2011	The Good Wife	Finn	Episode: "Get a Room"
2011	Off the Map	Pher	2 episodes
2011	Unforgettable	Joe Williams	Episode: "Lost Things"
2012–2014	Anger Management	Patrick	Main cast
2012	GCB	Reverend Steve Stewart	2 episodes
2012	The Mentalist	Evan Kress	Episode: "War of the Roses"
2012	Nurse Jackie	Gabe	Episode: "Slow Growing Monsters"
2012	Royal Pains	Homer	Episode: "Some Pig"
2019	The Marvelous Mrs. Maisel	Milken Prince	3 episodes

== Awards and nominations ==
Year	Award	Category	Work	Result
2015	Ovation Awards	Direction of a Musical	Spring Awakening	Won
2016	Tony Awards	Best Direction of a Musical	Spring Awakening	Nominated
2016	Drama Desk Awards	Outstanding Director of a Musical	Spring Awakening	Nominated
2016	Outer Critics Circle Award	Outstanding Director of a Musical	Spring Awakening	Won
2018	Tony Award	Best Direction of a Musical	Once on This Island	Nominated
2018	Outer Critics Circle Award	Outstanding Director of a Musical	Once on This Island	Nominated
2023	Tony Award	Best Direction of a Musical	Parade	Won
2023	Tony Award	Best Revival of a Musical	Parade	Won
2023	Outer Critics Circle Award	Outstanding Director of a Musical	Parade	Won
2023	Drama Desk Award	Outstanding Revival of a Musical	Parade	Won
2025	Tony Award	Best Revival of a Musical	Sunset Boulevard	Won
2025	Tony Award	Best Direction of a Musical	Maybe Happy Ending	Won
2025	Tony Award	Best Musical	Maybe Happy Ending	Won
2025	Outer Critics Circle Award	Outstanding Director of a Musical	Maybe Happy Ending	Won
2025	Drama League Awards	Outstanding Direction of a Musical	Maybe Happy Ending	Won
2025	Drama Desk Award	Outstanding Director of a Musical	Maybe Happy Ending	Won
2025	Drama Desk Award	Outstanding Musical	Maybe Happy Ending	Won
2025	Drama Desk Award	Outstanding Revival of a Musical	Sunset Boulevard	Nominated
2026	Tony Award	Best Direction of a Musical	The Lost Boys	Nominated
2026	Tony Award	Best Lighting Design of a Musical	The Lost Boys	Won
2026	Drama League Award	Outstanding Direction of a Musical	The Lost Boys	Nominated
2026	Outer Critics Circle Award	Outstanding Director of a Musical	The Lost Boys	Nominated
2026	Outer Critics Circle Award	Outstanding Lighting Design of a Musical (shared with Jen Schriever)	The Lost Boys	Won
2026	Drama Desk Awards	Outstanding Lighting Design of a Musical (shared with Jen Schriever)	The Lost Boys	Won

== See also ==
- List of LGBTQ people from New York City
