= Anger Management (TV series) =

American television sitcom

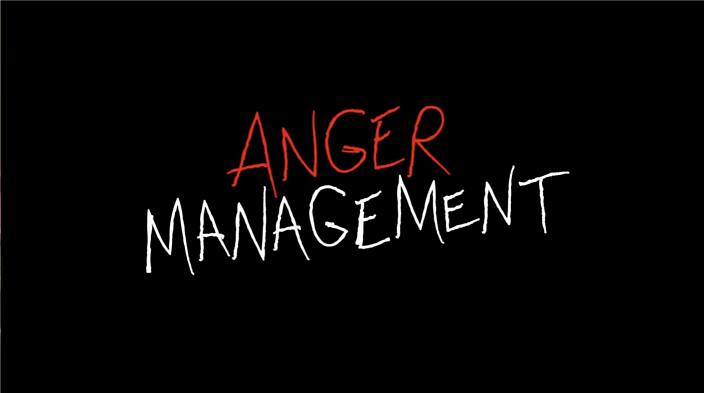
- Genre: Sitcom
- Created by: Bruce Helford
- Based on: Anger Management by David S. Dorfman
- Showrunners: Bruce Helford; Dave Caplan
- Starring: Charlie Sheen; Selma Blair; Shawnee Smith; Daniela Bobadilla; Noureen DeWulf; Michael Arden; Derek Richardson; Barry Corbin; Brian Austin Green; Laura Bell Bundy
- Opening theme: "Anger Management Theme" by Raney Shockne
- Composer: Raney Shockne
- Country of origin: United States
- Original language: English
- No. of seasons: 2
- No. of episodes: 100 (list of episodes)

Production
- Executive producers: Bruce Helford; Ramon Estevez; Charlie Sheen; Dave Caplan; Mark Burg; Vince Totino; Joe Roth; Bob Kushell; Robert Maron
- Producers: Michael Loftus; Daniel Dratch; Kent Zbornak
- Cinematography: Peter Smokler (season 1); Hunt Hibler (season 2)
- Editor: John Fuller
- Camera setup: Multi-camera
- Running time: 21–22 minutes
- Production companies: Mohawk Productions; Revolution Studios; Estevez/Sheen Productions; Twisted Television; Debmar-Mercury; Lionsgate Television

Original release
- Network: FX
- Release: June 28, 2012 – December 22, 2014

Anger Management is an American television multi-camera sitcom created by Bruce Helford that premiered on FX on June 28, 2012. The series is loosely based on the 2003 film of the same title and stars Charlie Sheen in a variation of the Adam Sandler and Jack Nicholson film. The series received 5.74 million viewers in its debut, breaking the record as the most-watched sitcom premiere in American cable television history. The series ended after its 100th episode, which aired on December 22, 2014.

== Premise ==
The series revolves around Charlie Goodson (Sheen), a one-time minor league baseball player who struggled to take the next step because of his recurring anger issues. Thanks to a therapist, Dr. Kate Wales (Selma Blair), Charlie was able to get his issues under control and finally make it to the major leagues. But he had a relapse during a big league game, breaking a bat over his knee in anger and causing a career-ending injury.

The incident inspired Charlie to return to school and become an anger management therapist. Charlie is divorced from Jennifer (Shawnee Smith), on whom he cheated multiple times during his baseball-playing days. The two still see a lot of each other because they share joint custody of their teenage daughter Sam (Daniela Bobadilla), who has obsessive-compulsive disorder.

Charlie has a complicated relationship with Kate, who is not only his therapist, but also his "sex buddy". He holds regular group sessions for court-directed anger-management patients in his home, and also does group sessions at an area prison.

== Episodes ==
Season	Episodes	Originally released	
Season	Episodes	First released	Last released
1	10	June 28, 2012	August 23, 2012
2	90	January 17, 2013	December 22, 2014

== Cast and characters ==
=== Main ===
- Charlie Sheen as Dr. Charles "Charlie" Goodson, a former professional baseball player turned anger-management therapist.
- Selma Blair as Dr. Kate Wales, Charlie's ex–therapist colleague and casual sex partner. (episodes 1–52)
- Shawnee Smith as Jennifer Goodson, Charlie's ex-wife. (Note: While still credited among the main cast every episode, Smith's role in the series was greatly reduced and from late 2013 she only appeared in a small number of episodes.)
- Daniela Bobadilla as Sam Goodson, Charlie and Jennifer's teenage daughter. (episodes 1–52, 54, 57 and 63)
- Noureen DeWulf as Lacey Patel, Charlie's spoiled, shallow, destructive & violent anger-management patient.
- Michael Arden as Patrick, Charlie's homosexual passive-aggressive anger-management patient.
- Derek Richardson as Nolan Johnson, Charlie's normally unassertive & dismissive anger-management patient.
- Barry Corbin as Ed, Charlie's elderly redneck anger-management patient, who enjoys other people's misery. (episodes 3–100; recurring previously)
- Brian Austin Green as Sean Healy, Charlie's nemesis, who has also dated Jennifer. After Jennifer leaves him over his infidelity, Sean and Charlie become friends and tomcat around together. (episodes 45–100; recurring previously)
- Laura Bell Bundy as Dr. Jordan Denby, a new psychologist and business partner for Charlie. Often Charlie's comic foil, Jordan links up sexually with Sean Healy. She also plays Jordan's identical twin sister, Jessie. (episodes 47–100)

=== Recurring ===
- Brett Butler as Brett, the female bartender at the Merry Peasant tavern that Charlie frequents.
- Michael Boatman as Michael, Charlie's neighbor and friend, who is in the real estate business. He is always freeloading off Charlie while listening to him talk about his romantic pursuits. He is especially unlucky at love. (episodes 1–55, guest episode 95)
- James Black as Cleo/Derek, a "gay" member of Charlie's prison anger-therapy group. In "Charlie's Patient Gets Out of Jail", Cleo is released on parole and reveals to Charlie that his real name is Derek and that he had a wife before going to prison, claiming he's only "prison gay".
- Darius McCrary as Donovan, a "prison gay" member of Charlie's prison anger-therapy group; Cleo/Derek's romantic partner. He acts effete in prison, but relatively masculine on the outside. (episodes 1–42)
- Stephen Taylor as Wayne Dwayne Earl, a member of Charlie's prison anger-therapy group. Despite a seemingly pleasant, philosophical demeanor, he's revealed to have been a dangerous serial killer.
- Aldo Gonzalez as Ernesto Sylvia, a member of Charlie's prison anger-therapy group.
- Martin Sheen as Martin Goodson, Charlie's father. (episodes 10–100)
- Steve Valentine as Dr. Moore, a rival psychiatrist whom Charlie considers his arch enemy. (episodes 13–44)
- Anna Hutchison as Sasha, a hooker who is occasionally a real girlfriend for Charlie. She and Charlie are briefly married after a wild night in Las Vegas. (episodes 49–92)
- Ajay Mehta as Sanjay Patel, Lacey's father.
- Meera Simhan as Mira Patel, Lacey's mother.
- Schuyler Helford as Sateen, Lacey's sister, who is frequently competing with her.
- Michael Gross as Dr. Randy Warren, a "psychic psychologist" whom Charlie exposes as a fraud. He briefly appears in Charlie's prison therapy group later on. (episodes 77–80)
- Elaine Hendrix as Warden Hartley, the new warden at the prison where Charlie and Jordan work. (episodes 79–83)

== Production ==
On July 18, 2011, it was announced that a show based on the 2003 film of the same name was in development with Charlie Sheen starring in the role originally played by Jack Nicholson from the film. The series was Sheen's first acting role since he was officially fired from the hit CBS sitcom Two and a Half Men.

On October 27, 2011, it was announced that FX had picked up the series with a 10/90 order; an initial ten-episode order from Debmar-Mercury which, if successful, FX would then order an additional 90 episodes from. On August 29, 2012, it was announced that the show would be picked up for a further 90 episodes. On January 9, 2013, FX president John Landgraf said that there will essentially be "45 new episodes per year". Landgraf also announced that Martin Sheen, who guest-starred in season one as Charlie's on-screen father, would become a season two regular cast member. While Martin did appear more frequently on the show, it was only in selected episodes and he was ultimately not promoted to regular cast member.

FX paid a $600,000-per-episode license fee for the series. To boost its sagging season-two ratings, FX announced that four episodes (two of them first-run) would air on FX's parent network Fox on Monday nights in June, starting June 3, 2013.

=== Casting ===
Casting announcements began in January 2012, with Shawnee Smith and Selma Blair first cast as the two female leads. Smith was cast as Charlie's ex-wife and Blair was cast as Charlie's therapist and possible love interest.

Several actresses tested for the two female lead roles, including Julie Benz, Jenica Bergere, Elaine Hendrix (who would later get a role on the show), Kate Reinders and Nichole Hiltz.

Next to be cast was Noureen DeWulf, in the role of Lacey, a spoiled rich girl who is sentenced to join the therapy group after shooting her boyfriend in the testicles when he cheated on her. Michael Arden and Daniela Bobadilla were cast as, respectively, Patrick (an openly gay member of Charlie's therapy group) and Sam (Charlie's teenaged daughter who has obsessive–compulsive disorder). Barry Corbin was cast as Ed, a cranky, bigoted Vietnam veteran and the member of the therapy group who is angry at everyone. Originally billed as a recurring character, the producers decided after just two episodes to make Ed a series regular. Derek Richardson was the last actor cast in the series, in the role of Nolan, a frequently stoned member of the therapy group whose anger issue is that he has no anger. Michael Boatman has a recurring role as Charlie's friend and neighbor Michael, reuniting with Sheen after they previously worked together on Spin City.

Brian Austin Green, who initially made a guest appearance, was promoted to a starring role following the dismissal of Selma Blair. Denise Richards, Lindsay Lohan, CeeLo Green, and Kerri Kenney-Silver made guest appearances. Guitarist Slash made a cameo appearance. Sheen's father, Martin Sheen, who made a guest appearance in season one as Charlie's on-screen father, had an expanded role in the second season. FX president John Landgraf said, "I thought it would be a better series if it was also a multi-generational series".

=== Selma Blair's dismissal ===
On June 17, 2013, TMZ reported that Sheen had told producers that he would refuse to work should Blair turn up to work that day as a result of her being the most vocal among the cast and crew regarding complaints about his being a "menace" to work with – specifically questioning his punctuality and work ethic. The following day, TMZ reported that Sheen had told the producers that, if they refused to fire Blair, then he would quit. Later that day, Lionsgate issued a statement confirming that Blair would not be returning to the show and that a new female lead role would be created to fill the void.

The new female lead role was described as a "by-the-book psychiatrist" who joins Charlie to co-author the sex study research he and Kate had been working on before she left and moved to India. On August 5, 2013, FX announced that Laura Bell Bundy would be replacing Blair as Charlie's new colleague, Dr. Jordan Denby, with production on the first episode featuring Bundy's character beginning that same day. It was announced that Brian Austin Green would have an expanded role following Blair's firing.

==== Potential lawsuit ====
On September 13, 2013, TMZ reported that Blair was threatening to sue both Sheen and Lionsgate Entertainment for the $1.2 million she would have earned had she not been dismissed from the show but also noted that both sides were talking and attempting to reach a settlement. It was also reported that a decision had already been made prior to her dismissal to write her off the show, as "America didn't want to see Charlie with just one girlfriend" – however, the plan was to phase the character out over eight episodes and that, once Sheen heard of Blair's comments, "that process was accelerated" and the character abruptly moved to India.

==== Canceled episode ====
In June 2013, a press release for an episode titled "Charlie and Kate Have Sex for Science" stated that the episode was set to air on June 27, 2013, as the twenty-sixth episode of the season. The episode was to see Charlie and Kate take part in their own sex study, while Lacey prepares for her first sales call with help from Patrick and Nolan. Following the aftermath of Blair's dismissal, the planned broadcast was canceled and replaced with "Charlie and the Hot Nerd" – the first episode produced without Blair. The status of "Charlie and Kate Have Sex for Science" is unknown, as all episodes with production codes up to, and including, 1040 (Blair's final episode) have aired. An episode with a similar title, but with different storylines, named "Charlie Does It for Science" aired on December 5, 2013.

== Broadcast ==
The original broadcast was on the American cable channel FX from June 28, 2012, and was later broadcast in the summer of 2013 by Fox. In Canada, the series premiered on CTV on August 12, 2012. New episodes later aired on M3. In the United Kingdom/Ireland it premiered on Comedy Central on September 12, 2012, and was later shown on 4Music. Anger Management began airing in Australia on the Nine Network on August 14, 2012, and in New Zealand on TVNZ's TV2 from August 15, 2012. The series was in traditional broadcast syndication in the United States from September 2014 until September 2018, distributed by Debmar-Mercury and Twentieth Television.

== Reception ==
Anger Management received largely unfavorable reviews. Based on 35 reviews collected by Rotten Tomatoes, the first season of Anger Management received an average 23% overall "Rotten" score, with an average rating of 5.20/10; the website's consensus states, "Anger Management is aggressively so-so, with thin characters and a few groan-worthy gags for every good one."Metacritic, which uses a weighted average, gave the first season of the show a score of 44 out of 100 based on 33 critics' reviews.

Linda Stasi of the New York Post called the series "not so bad", adding "Anger Management is pretty conventional up to and including an idiot laugh track—and a character named Charlie—again. But maybe the familiar is what will keep crazy Charlie [Sheen] from killing himself and others in a blind, drunken, psycho haze on set. Or maybe not." The Wall Street Journal's Nancy DeWolf Smith thought the series was "usually funny, often clever" and added "The accomplishment here is that tight writing and editing, a solid cast with good timing and Mr. Sheen's chops as the ne plus ultra of sitcom performers, make the whole thing feel, if not entirely fresh—then crisp."

Alan Sepinwall of HitFix stated: "Anger Management is Charlie Sheen doing what Charlie Sheen does—on-screen. It's not artful, it's not elegant ... It will likely give his fans what they want. And if there are enough of them to trigger the order for the extra 90 episodes, then FX, Helford and everyone else will feel justified in taking another chance on the guy, despite what happened in the past."

The Huffington Post's Maureen Ryan stated: "despite the careful attention to image enhancement possibilities, the core ugliness and toxic narcissism of 'Anger Management' are impossible to ignore. ... Whoever 'Anger Management' benefits – and it certainly won't be viewers used to FX's usual scripted fare – whole enterprise is really just image management. Nice work if you can get it."

== Home media ==
Title	DVD release			Notes
Title	Region 1	Region 2	Region 4	Notes
Season One	January 8, 2013	January 14, 2013	April 30, 2014	Contains all 10 episodes from Season One; Available in both DVD and Blu-ray format in the United States and Canada; Available only on DVD format in UK; Available only on DVD format in Australia
Volume Two	October 15, 2013	October 21, 2013	TBA	Contains episodes 1–22 from Season Two; Available on both DVD and Blu-ray format in the United States and Canada; Available only on DVD format in the UK
Volume Three	April 15, 2014	TBA	TBA	Contains episodes 23–46 from Season Two; Available on both DVD and Blu-ray format in the United States and Canada
