= The Times They Are a-Changin' (musical) =

2006 Bob Dylan jukebox musical

- Music: Bob Dylan
- Lyrics: Bob Dylan
- Productions: 2006 San Diego; 2006 Broadway

The Times They Are a-Changin' was a 2006 dance musical featuring the songs of Bob Dylan, conceived, directed and choreographed by Twyla Tharp.

The show takes place in a setting described as "somewhere between awake and asleep," a dreamlike circus environment in which a coming-of-age conflict between a tyrannical circus master, Captain Ahrab, his idealistic son, Coyote, and a circus performer, Cleo, is told among a choreographed world of clowns, contortionists and Big Tops.

Premiering in San Diego in February 2006, the show eventually moved to Broadway, opening on October 26, 2006. The show received uniformly negative reviews, and closed on November 19, 2006 after 35 previews and 28 performances.

== Background ==
In 2002, Twyla Tharp brought to Broadway a dance musical based on the songs of Billy Joel, Movin' Out, which was a commercial success and ran for more than three years.

The idea for a dance musical based on Dylan's work was initiated by the artist himself, who contacted Tharp suggesting the collaboration; however, Dylan had no creative input on the eventual production.

Tharp spent a year on research for the production, as well as another year-and-a-half on casting, rehearsing and workshopping.

The show was described in its Broadway Playbill as "A tale of fathers and sons, of men and women, of leaders and followers, of immobility and change," which "uses prophecy, parable, metaphor, accusation and confession—like the Dylan songs which comprise it—to confront us with images and ideas of who we are, and who it is possible to be.”

Despite the show's categorization as a "dance musical," Tharp did not consider it so: the show's website called it instead "an original action-adventure fable conceived by Ms. Tharp."

== Production history ==
The show debuted at the Old Globe Theatre in San Diego, California on February 9, 2006 running through March 2006.

The show premiered on Broadway at the Brooks Atkinson Theatre on October 26, 2006. Sets and costumes were by Santo Loquasto, and lighting by Donald Holder. The cast featured John Selya, Michael Arden, Neil Haskell, Thom Sesma, and Lisa Brescia.

== Original cast ==
2006 Broadway production

- Coyote – Michael Arden
- Captain Ahrab – Thom Sesma
- Cleo – Lisa Brescia
- Ensemble – Lisa Gajda, Neil Haskell, Jason McDole, Charlie Neshyba-Hodges, Jonathan Nosan, John Selya, Ron Todorowski

== Production team ==
2006 Broadway production

- Twyla Tharp – Conceiver, Director, Choreographer
- Santo Loquasto – Scenic and costume design
- Donald Holder – Lighting design
- Peter Hylenski – Sound design
- Michael Dansicker and Bob Dylan – Orchestrations
- Henry Aronson – Music director

== Musical numbers ==
The show was performed without an intermission

- "The Times They Are A-Changin'"
- "Highway 61 Revisited"
- "Don't Think Twice, It's All Right"
- "Just Like a Woman"
- "Like a Rolling Stone"
- "Everything is Broken"
- "Desolation Row"
- "Rainy Day Women #12 & 35"
- "Mr. Tambourine Man"
- "Man Gave Names to All the Animals"
- "Masters of War"
- "Blowin' in the Wind"
- "Please, Mrs. Henry"
- "On a Night Like This"
- "Lay, Lady, Lay"
- "I'll Be Your Baby Tonight"
- "Simple Twist of Fate"
- "Summer Days"
- "Gotta Serve Somebody"
- "Not Dark Yet"
- "Knockin' on Heaven's Door"
- "Maggie's Farm"
- "I Believe In You"
- "Dignity"
- "Forever Young"

== Reception ==
The show received uniformly negative reviews on Broadway, criticizing it generally for its "addled," "inscrutable," yet also "wearyingly familiar" setting and plot; its circus-inspired staging; and its "prosaic," "literal-minded" staging of Dylan's songs.

Ben Brantley of the New York Times called the show the worst thus far of the decade's spate of jukebox musicals, writing that it gave Dylan's work a "systematic steamrolling[.]" He criticized the show for taking the "metaphoric images" of Dylan's work, "which float miragelike when heard in song," and "[nailing them] down with literal visual equivalents" – and therefore, "even as the dancers seem to fly, Mr. Dylan's lyrics are hammered, one by one, into the ground."

David Rooney of Variety wrote that "Tharp [...] has no idea how to make the songs dynamic, either planting the singers in declamatory deadlock or having them stride about aimlessly while assorted clowns skip, tumble, flip and bounce on the trampoline surfaces of Santo Loquasto's junkyard set," so that "even when the songs do summon some emotional intensity, all the awkward, hokey buffoonery going on in the background (in unfortunate Leigh Bowery-esque costumes and makeup) smothers it." He also criticized the show's "[h]o-hum," "generic father-son plot."

Frank Scheck of the Hollywood Reporter wrote that the show "plays like an overconceived concert, with Tharp's choreography, as vibrant and physical as it is here, lacking the variety of her earlier work"; Scott Brown of Entertainment Weekly called the production "utterly wrongheaded," with Tharp demonstrating that "she clearly has no choreographic bond with [Dylan's] music"; Rob Sheffield of Rolling Stone wrote that "[i]t's hard to describe the show without making it sound like a stoned nightmare," and that "the Broadway belters have no feel for Dylan's meter or melodies; they just ham up the songs with dumb touches like Ahrab grinding his hips as he sings, 'She makes love just like a woman!'"; Terry Teachout of The Wall Street Journal called the show "so bad that it makes you forget how good the songs are," with "prettified singing" that was "all wrong," and wrote that "if you went to see this show knowing nothing about [Tharp], you'd go home assuming that she was a pretentious buffoon."

The show closed on November 19, 2006 after 35 previews and 28 performances, and was a financial flop.

Tharp later (as described by the New York Times) expressed regret that she "did not stick closely enough to her instincts in its creation[.]"

== See also ==
- Girl from the North Country - a second jukebox musical using Dylan's catalogue
- The Times They Are a-Changin' - The album and music of Dylan
