= Damon Intrabartolo =

American composer, orchestrator and conductor

Damon Intrabartolo (1974 – August 13, 2013) was an American composer, orchestrator and conductor. He attended the University of Southern California School of Music and departed before graduation to work as an assistant to John Ottman on The Usual Suspects. His most famous work is the musical Bare.

A resident of Los Angeles, California, he appeared in a 2001 documentary featuring six gay men attending the Burning Man festival, called On the Bus.

On August 13, 2013, Intrabartolo died suddenly in Arizona. He was 39 years old.

== Work ==
Damon collaborated with Ottman for 13 years as an orchestrator and conductor on films including:

- Halloween H20 (1998)
- Lake Placid (1999)
- Bubble Boy (2001)
- Pumpkin (2002)
- Eight Legged Freaks (2002)
- X2: X-Men United (2003)
- Gothika (2003)
- Cellular (2004)
- Hide and Seek (2005)
- Fantastic Four (2005)
- Superman Returns (2006)

Intrabartolo also served as an orchestrator and conductor on In Good Company (2004), American Dreamz (2006) and the acclaimed Dreamgirls (2006) underscore with Hedwig and the Angry Inch composer Stephen Trask.

He composed the musical Bare: A Pop Opera; his company God Help! Productions also produced the 2000 world premiere in Los Angeles. He composed and produced the musical Ann E. Wrecksick and the Odyssey of the Bulimic Orphans; both shows played in Los Angeles and New York City. He also composed the musical PopNation, which was first workshopped in Los Angeles. In 2012 and 2013, Canton Theatrical presented industry readings in New York.

== Awards ==
- 2001 Ovation Award
- Backstage Garland Award
- LA Drama Critics Circle Award
- LA Weekly Award for bare (Best Original Score & Best Musical).
