= Janet Billig Rich =

American artist manager (born 1967)

- Born: Janet Sue Billig; 1967 (age 58–59); Long Island, New York, U.S.
- Employer: Manage This!
- Known for: Artist manager, music supervisor, producer, record label executive
- Spouse: David Rich

Janet Billig Rich (born Janet Sue Billig; July 31, 1967) is an artist manager, music supervisor, producer, and Broadway theater producer.

Billig Rich currently operates the Los Angeles entertainment company Manage This!, which she founded and launched in 1996. She oversees the music and acting career of Grammy-winning singer-songwriter Lisa Loeb, as well as her Lisa Loeb Eyewear Collection, Camp Lisa Foundation, and her Wake Up! Brew coffee brand. She co-produces and handled music licensing for the Tony-nominated Broadway plays Rock of Ages, Moulin Rouge, and more.

Billig Rich was the musical supervisor of Netflix's 2016 film, I'll Sleep When I'm Dead, and the documentary STEP from Fox Searchlight released in Summer 2017, and more recently the series "Surviving Death," "Sisters on Track" and "Found." In addition, she is the Music Supervisor for many commercials including for the Alaska Virgin Airlines merger, and the Alaska Airlines "Safety Dance" commercial. She is the music supervisor on many Peloton commercials.

Early in her career, she worked at Caroline Records handling publicity and A&R, where she worked closely with bands such as Pussy Galore, Primus, Smashing Pumpkins, Hole, and White Zombie,. After Caroline, she worked at Gold Mountain Entertainment, where she managed Nirvana, The Breeders, The Lemonheads, Hole, Walt Mink, and Dinosaur Jr. She became the youngest senior executive at Atlantic Records in the mid-1990s, where she developed artists such as Sugar Ray, Matchbox 20, and Jewel.

As the former manager, during her tenure at Gold Mountain Entertainment, Billig Rich's notable contributions to the rock band Nirvana have been highlighted in a number of books focused on the band's career.

== Early life ==
Janet Billig Rich was born Janet Sue Billig in Queens, New York to Priscilla and Norbert Billig. She has stated she loved music from a young age, and as a girl was obsessed with "Nadia's Theme." While attending Calhoun High School on Long Island she became an avid fan of The Replacements, and drove around the country following their tours. She later graduated from New York University.

== Career ==
Billig Rich began working in music by selling merchandise for bands at New York rock clubs. She then went on to work at Caroline Records in publicity and A&R. At Caroline, she worked with bands such as Primus, Pussy Galore, Smashing Pumpkins, Hole, White Zombie, and Jon Spencer Blues Explosion. After joining the Manhattan-based Gold Mountain Entertainment in the early 1990s, she served as a manager for bands such as Hole, Nirvana, The Breeders, The Lemonheads, Walt Mink and Dinosaur Jr.

In 1995, New York Magazine named her one of the "100 Smartest New Yorkers."

By the mid-1990s, she became the youngest senior executive at Atlantic Records. While at Atlantic as VP for a year, she ran the A&R department and helped develop artists such as Sugar Ray, Matchbox 20, and Jewel, and by 2000 she was running her own music management company in New York City, with clients including Bijou Phillips, T-Bone Burnett, and Lisa Loeb. She was also a partner at Immortal Management, an entertainment company based in Santa Monica, California.

== Caroline Records ==
Beginning in 1986, Billig Rich served as publicist and manager for a slew of America's leading rock bands, including Pussy Galore, Primus, White Zombie, Smashing Pumpkins, and Hole, during her three-year tenure.

== Gold Mountain Entertainment ==
In 1989, Billig Rich joined the team of Gold Mountain Entertainment, founded just six years prior by Ron Stone, Danny Goldberg, and Burt Stein, and later with John Silva as partner. It was there that she managed and oversaw the careers of musical acts like Hole, Nirvana, The Breeders, The Lemonheads, and Dinosaur Jr.

== Atlantic Records ==
Billig Rich came aboard Atlantic Records in 1995, becoming the youngest senior executive at the label, and developing and breaking the mainstream careers of major 90s artists like Jewel, with the release of her debut album, Pieces of You; Sugar Ray, with the release of their debut album, Lemonade and Brownies; Collective Soul, with the release of their first album, Hints Allegations and Things Left Unsaid; and Matchbox 20, with the release of their debut album, Yourself or Someone Like You.

== Manage This! ==
Janet formed the management and production company Manage This! in New York City in 1996. Through Manage This! she has worked extensively with roster artists like Lisa Loeb, Courtney Love, Hole, Guided By Voices, Jon Spencer Blues Explosion, Kim Deal, Cibo Matto, and a number of others.

Through Manage This! she has also produced and served as music supervisor for a number of major concert tours, television shows, and films, including production on the Pixies reunion tour and documentary loudQUIETloud. She produced the Down From the Mountain tour – which featured music from the musical film O Brother, Where Art Thou?, and worked with Linkin Park on their Projekt Revolution tours.

On 19 March 2004, Billig Rich was featured on the cover of the New York Post while bailing Courtney Love out of jail.

She was co-producer for the TV special Crossover (2001), associate producer for the TV series documentary Rocked with Gina Gershon (2004), and produced five episodes of the 2006 unscripted television series #1 Single, which starred Lisa Loeb.

== Music supervision and clearances ==
Since 2004, Billig Rich has provided music supervision and music clearance for a number of projects, including the documentary Jiro Dreams of Sushi, the TV series Family Bonds, the documentary What Remains, Pretty Persuasion, the TV documentaries Pretty Things, The Biz, The Fashionista Diaries, Surfwise, 12 episodes of Kimora: Life in the Fab Lane, Nic & Tristan Go Mega Dega, See You in September, Barry Munday, and No One Dies in Lily Dale.

Billig Rich has also provided music clearance for movies such as "Knuckleball!," "Rock of Ages," "Jiro Dreams of Sushi," Adam Duritz's "Freeloaders," Steven Cantor-directed films "Twyla Moves," "Dancer," "Ballet Now," and "Reporter," as well as a number of TV series, such as 10 episodes of NBC's "Perfect Harmony," "Hood River," The Fashionista Diaries, 12 episodes of Kimora: Life in the Fab Lane.

Working with producer Matt Weaver, Billig Rich was the music supervisor of the 2016 Netflix documentary, I'll Sleep When I'm Dead, the story of DJ Aoki. In addition, she was the music supervisor for the Amanda Lipitz-directed documentary film, STEP, featured at Sundance in January 2017, and subsequently sold to Fox Searchlight for distribution. The film, which documents the senior year of a girls' high-school step dance team in inner-city Baltimore was released in Summer 2017.

In 2016, Billig Rich began working on a pair of TV commercials. She began as music producer for the Alaska Virgin Airlines merger spot released in early 2017. In March 2017, Muscle Milk released a new television commercial featuring Steph Curry doing The Wiggle to a remake of the song "Wiggle It" by 2 In A Room. The commercial, called "Strong Feels Good," was music supervised by Billig Rich. She has also served as music supervisor for Method Products' 2018 commercial "There's Good Inside," Peloton's 2020 "Workouts for the Family" Christmas commercial, and a brand new TikTok campaign for Benefit Cosmetics.

She has provided music clearances for Broadway products, such as Disaster! The Musical, TINA, The Cher Show, Come From Away, Rock of Ages, 2019's Moulin Rouge, 2024's Drag The Musical starring Alaska Thunderf*ck and Stranger Things: First Shadow. Billig Rich has been quoted in the New York Times on the subject of the music clearance process for the show. Billig Rich provides all music services and consultation for the "For the Record" live shows including "Tarantino," "Scorsese: American Crime Requiem," "Garry and Penny Marshall," "Love Actually Love," "BAZ Star Crossed Love" at The Palazzo and "For the Record: Brat Pack" on Norwegian Cruise Lines.

Billig Rich was nominated as one of the Top 40 "Women in Music" by Billboard Magazine in December 2011. In 2018, Billig Rich earned the "Boss Lady Award" from the Women in Music Network.

In March 2020, Billig Rich partnered with Lisa Moberly to form Loudspeaker Music Group, which provides music clearance services for a wide range of entertainment projects from streaming to advertising to film and television and live theater. As every project's music needs are unique, its focus is to provide creative partners with music licensing solutions that serve both the artistic and financial demands, specific to their projects.

== Lisa Loeb ==
Billig Rich has managed the career of singer-songwriter Lisa Loeb, beginning in 1995 at the start of Loeb's commercial career.

She oversees Loeb's entire career, including her music, acting, voiceover, commercial and publishing work, in addition to her Lisa Loeb Eyewear brand, of which she serves as Loeb's business partner, in addition to Loeb's Camp Lisa nonprofit foundation, which sends underserved kids to camp, and Loeb's organic and fair-trade Wake Up! Coffee brand.

She has managed the release of Loeb's entire 15-album discography, which includes Tails, Firecracker, the Grammy-winning Best Children's Album Feel What U Feel, and her most recent, A Simple Trick To Happiness.

Billig Rich also produced Loeb's 2006 E! reality series, #1 Single.

== Rock of Ages ==
Around 2003, Matt Weaver asked Billig Rich and a number of collaborators to help him develop and pitch the concept of a musical based on 1980s rock hits. Bands were to include Journey, Styx, REO Speedwagon, Foreigner, Pat Benatar, and Whitesnake. She became one of multiple producers for the show and took on the role of talking to bands and securing song rights, a process which she has said took several years. Rock of Ages premiered in 2005.

After playing off-Broadway in New York in fall 2008, it opened on Broadway on 7 April 2009. In 2009, the play received five Tony Award nominations, including Best Musical. Billig Rich is Executive Producer of the film version of Rock of Ages, which was released in June 2012 and stars Tom Cruise, Alec Baldwin, and Catherine Zeta-Jones.

In 2020, Billig Rich helped launch Los Angeles' The Bourbon Room, an all-new, specially-built 4,000-square-foot completely immersive performance venue, with bar and restaurant, which serves as the permanent home of Rock of Ages Hollywood.

== Personal life ==
As of 2011, Billig Rich lives in Encino, California with her husband and their twins, Molly and Harrison, born in 2003.
