= Asa Somers =

American actor

Asa Somers (born December 5, 1969) is an American stage, film, and television actor.

== Education ==
He is an alumnus of the Phillips Exeter Academy and earned a Bachelor of Arts degree in English literature and theatre studies at Yale University.

== Career ==
=== Stage work ===
Somers made his Broadway debut in The Rocky Horror Show as a Phantom and Narrator understudy, then went on to join the original Broadway casts of Dance of the Vampires as Herbert, Taboo as the fight captain and standby for Boy George, Grey Gardens as a standby for Joe and Jerry, and Next to Normal.

He was also in the Off Broadway productions of Once Around The Sun as Kevin at the Zipper Theatre, the Playwrights Horizons production of The Burnt Part Boys as Miner Taylor, Hedwig and the Angry Inch as Hedwig at the Jane Street Theatre, and Next to Normal as Dr. Madden/Dr. Fine at the Second Stage Theatre.

Somers originated Dan in the U.S. national tour cast of Next to Normal, alongside Alice Ripley, Emma Hunton, Curt Hansen, and Jeremy Kushnier and stayed with the production until its close on July 30, 2011.

Somers recently revived his role as Dan Goodman in Penn State's CentreStage production of Next to Normal, which played at the Pavilion Theatre from June 6 to 14, 2014.

As of December 2016, he is a standby for the role of Larry Murphy in Dear Evan Hansen on Broadway.

==== Something As Big As This ====
Somers' rock musical, Something As Big As This, had a closed developmental reading on July 2, 2012. The reading cast included former Next to Normal cast members, Brian d'Arcy James, Preston Sadleir, and Emma Hunton and was directed by Louis Hobson.

The show will have a free public presentation at Seattle's Balagan Theatre on January 14, 2013. The workshop features a different cast than the 2012 closed reading but is directed by Louis Hobson, who also directed the reading.

=== Regional theatre ===
Somers appeared in the regional theatre productions of Kean as Edmund Kean at Yale University, We're All Dead as Oedipus Rex at the Blue Heron Arts Center, Hedwig and the Angry Inch as Hedwig at the Victoria Theatre in San Francisco, Hair as Berger at the Theatre Under The Stars in Houston, Man In The White Suit as Michael at New York Stage & Film, and Tallgrass Gothic as Daniel at the Actors Theatre of Louisville.

Somers recently finished a run at Dallas Theater Center, where he played The Narrator in Fly By Night, April 26 to May 26, 2013.

=== Television work ===
In 2000, Somers appeared as Blaine Richardson in The Sopranos episode "D-Girl." In 2003, he played the paramedic in Whoopi in the episode "Once Bitten." He appears as Chaz in the pilot episode of The Wedding Album. In 2007, Somers plays Mike Conneally in the Law & Order episode "Over Here." He has appeared twice in Law & Order: Special Victims Unit as Craig Vattic in the episode "Game" and as Colin Andrews in the episode "Smut." Somers is also a restaurant customer in the 2009 Ugly Betty episode "Blue on Blue" and plays Mr. Harper in The Good Wife episode "Heart." He recently appeared in Royal Pains and in Gossip Girl as Richard Wellings in the episode "It's a Dad, Dad, Dad, Dad World." In 2012, Somers played a Doctor in the second episode of Elementary, "While You Were Sleeping."

=== Film work ===
Somers co-stars as Kyle Cassimer in the 2009 independent film Clear Blue Tuesday, a rock musical revolving around the September 11 attacks, which opened at the Quad Cinema in Greenwich Village. He is featured in the independent films Never Forever as Rich, which was shown at the 2007 Sundance Film Festival, and Ira & Abby as Gus. Somers also appears in the shorts A Change of Climate as Eddie, When Stars Fall as Capella, and No, No Now as Adrian Lanes.

== Filmography ==
=== Film ===
Year	Title	Role	Notes
2006	Ira & Abby	Gus	
2007	Never Forever	Rich	
2009	Clear Blue Tuesday	Kyle Cassimer	Also writer

=== Television ===
Year	Title	Role	Notes
2000	The Sopranos	Blaine Richardson	Episode: "D-Girl"
2003	Whoopi	Paramedic	Episode: "Once Bitten"
2005, 2008	Law & Order: Special Victims Unit	Colin Andrews / Craig Vattic	2 episodes
2006	The Wedding Album	Chaz	Television film; unsold pilot
2007	Law & Order	Mike Conneally	Episode: "Over Here"
2007	Independent Lens	Self	Episode: "Grey Gardens: From East Hampton to Broadway"
2009	Ugly Betty	Restaurant Customer	Episode: "Blue on Blue"
2010	The Good Wife	Mr. Harper	Episode: "Heart"
2010	Gossip Girl	Richard Wellings	Episode: "It's a Dad, Dad, Dad, Dad World"
2010	Royal Pains	Frank	Episode: "The Hankover"
2011	Blue Bloods	Frank	Episode: "Lonely Hearts Club"
2012	Elementary	Doctor	Episode: "While You Were Sleeping"
2013	Person of Interest	TOVO Networking Advisor	Episode: "Trojan Horse"
2014	White Collar	Mr. Rawling	Episode: "Live Feed"
2014	Unforgettable	Holliman	Episode: "A Moveable Feast"
2015	Mr. Robot	Jeremy	Episode: "eps1.6_v1ew-s0urce.flv"
2016–2017	Unbreakable Kimmy Schmidt	Drew	3 episodes
2018	Billions	Ashley Cutler	2 episodes
2020	Tommy	Peet	Episode: "To Take a Hostage"

=== Video games ===
Year	Title	Role	Notes
2004	Grand Theft Auto: San Andreas	Pedestrian	Voice
2018	Red Dead Redemption 2	Arturo Bullard	Voice
