= D-Girl (disambiguation) =

A D-Girl is a development girl.

It can also refer to:

- "D-Girl (DopeGirl)", a song by American R&B singer Brooke Valentine
- "D-Girl" (The Sopranos episode)
- D-Girl, a Law & Order (season 7) episode
