= Kubiński =

Kubiński, or Kubińska (feminine), is a Polish surname. Notable people with the surname include:

- Cassandra Kubinski, American pop artist, songwriter, and actress
- Dan Kubinski, musician of Die Kreuzen
- Józef Kubiński, Polish footballer
- Kornelia Kubińska (born 1985), Polish cross country skier
- Tim Kubinski, American basketballer

== See also ==
- Kubina
