= Kubina =

Kubina is a Slovak language surname from the personal name Jakub. Notable people with the name include:

- Eugene G. Kubina (born 1948), American educator and businessman
- Jerzy Kubina (born 1956), Polish-born painter
- Pavel Kubina (born 1977), Czech former professional ice hockey defenceman
- Teodor Kubina (1880–1951), Polish Roman Catholic bishop

== See also ==
- Kuba (surname)
- Kubiński
