= Erin Hill =

American actress and musician

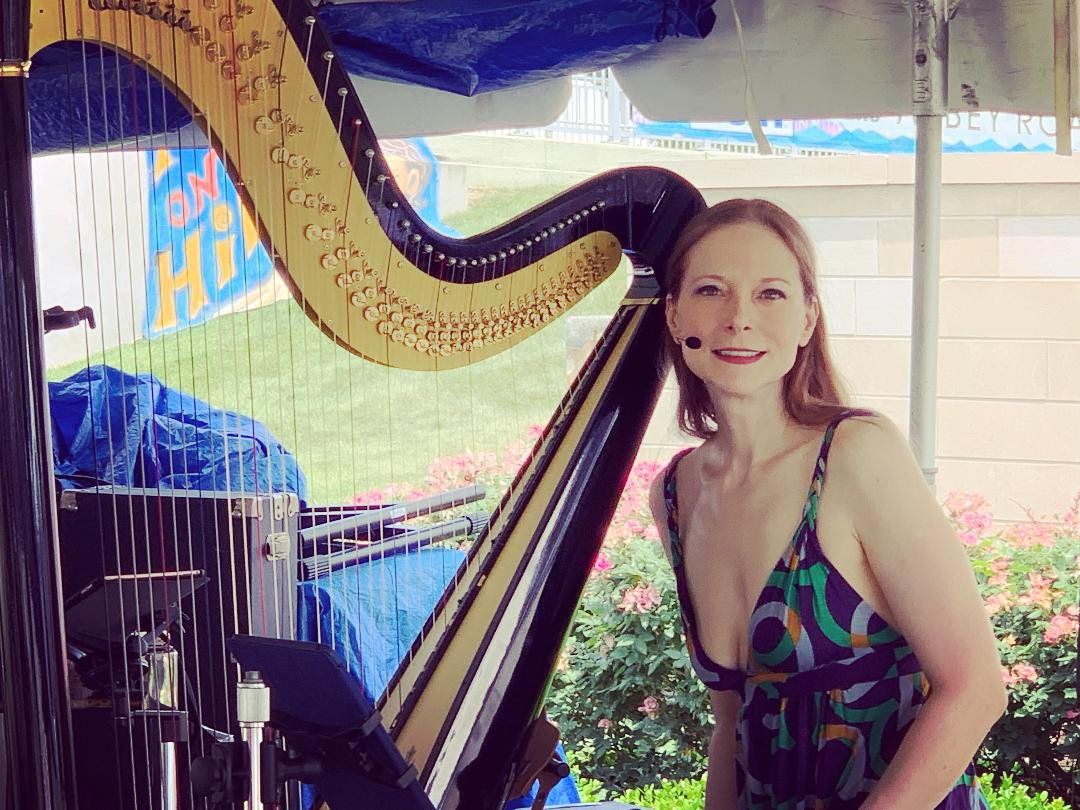
- Hill at the Abbey Road on the River Festival in 2019

Background information
- Born: Erin Kathleen Hill; Louisville, Kentucky, US
- Genres: Rock, pop, celtic
- Occupations: Harpist, singer, songwriter, musician, actress
- Instruments: Harp, vocals
- Years active: 1997–present
- Labels: Gridley Records, Cleopatra Records
- Website: erinhill.com

Erin Kathleen Hill is an American harpist, singer, songwriter, multi-instrumentalist and actress. Her Celtic album hit #1 on the Billboard World Music Chart and she has played and sung with Kanye West, Cyndi Lauper, Moby, Sinéad O'Connor, Enya, a-ha, Randy Newman, Jewel, Josh Groban, and many other celebrities, as well as Hillary Clinton, Michelle Obama, and for royalty.

As an actress, she has appeared on Broadway, film, and television, most notably as the Pretty White Girl Who Sings Dave's Thoughts on Comedy Central's Chappelle's Show. She originated the roles of Kate Mullins in Titanic on Broadway, and of Lulu in the Sam Mendes/Rob Marshall revival of Cabaret and appears on both Original Broadway Cast recordings. She played Sandra Mescal in the Tim Robbins film Cradle Will Rock and appears on the Original Motion Picture Soundtrack. She is an actor, composer and screenwriter in the film Clear Blue Tuesday, about which The New York Times said: "Erin Hill, as a giddy, harp-playing Trekker, stands out… The best and funniest scene in the film is Ms. Hill's".

The Los Angeles record label Cleopatra Records has released three of Hill's albums, starting with Harp Town in 2016. Harp Town features Hill's harp and voice arrangements of songs by artists such as Rihanna, Radiohead, The Beatles, Sinatra, Leonard Cohen, Edith Piaf, Adele, Lady Gaga, Smashing Pumpkins, Kansas, Alicia Keys, Roxy Music, and Kate Bush. Cleopatra also released Hill's album Christmas Harp, and her album of originals, Girl Inventor.

Hill is an avid science fiction fan and a regular performer at Dragon Con in Atlanta, and her "Lookout, Science" and "Giant Mushrooms" music videos were featured in the Dragon Con Independent Film Festival. USA Today premiered her sci-fi music video "Lookout, Science". Her westie dog MacLeod (named for the main character in the film Highlander) is a frequent co-star in her music videos. Her three electric harps are named V’ger (from Star Trek), Klaatu (from The Day the Earth Stood Still), and Ylla (from The Martian Chronicles).

Hill was featured in an HBO Game of Thrones promo, playing the Game of Thrones theme on her harp. She won an Independent Music Award for her song "Stun," from her Girl Inventor album. and she did Original Music and Sound Design for the Drama Desk Award-nominated That Play: a Solo Macbeth. Hill is also the voice and harp behind Tafne, a central character in the Android video game The Legacy of Barubash. Hill has also played her harp several years for the US Open Tennis Championships in the exclusive Hospitality Pavilion. Newsday has called her "the dangerously enjoyable Erin Hill."

In 2019, she debuted her show “Harp Oddity: The Music of David Bowie,” featuring Hill's arrangements of Bowie tunes on vocals and electric harp, along with her band.

== Discography ==
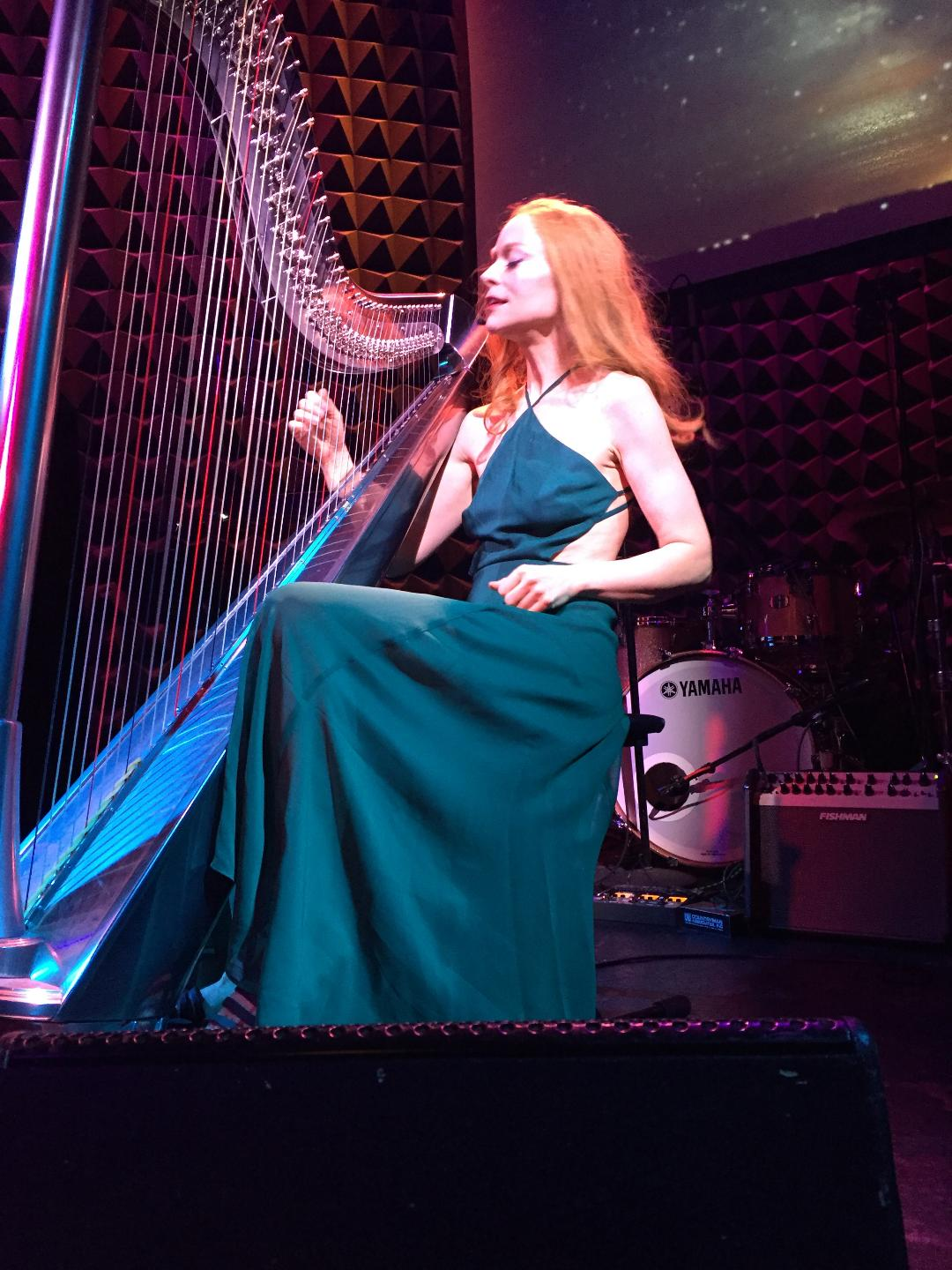
Hill performing at Joe's Pub, NYC in 2019

- I'm So Glad by Erin Hill (March 2019) Gridley Records. Erin Hill: songwriter, vocals, harp, percussion
- Pirate Jane (feat. Erin Hill) by The Peter Ulrich Collaboration (March 2018) City Canyons. Erin Hill: vocals, bass.
- Girl Inventor by Erin Hill (July 2017) Cleopatra. Erin Hill: songwriter, vocals, harp, keyboards, bass.
- Christmas Harp by Erin Hill (October 2016) Cleopatra. Erin Hill: vocals, harp, arrangements.
- Harp Town by Erin Hill (May 2016) Cleopatra. Erin Hill: vocals, harp, arrangements.
- Tempus Fugitives by The Peter Ulrich Collaboration (April 2015) City Canyons. Erin Hill: songwriter, vocals, harp, bass.
- Dark Daddy (feat. Erin Hill) by The Peter Ulrich Collaboration (November 2014) City Canyons. Erin Hill: songwriter, vocals, harp, bass.
- World of Nickhoo by The Dream Jam Band (April 2014) Dream Jam Productions. Erin Hill: vocals, harp
- Let It Snow by Jewel (September 2013) Somerset Group, Ltd. Erin Hill: harp
- Clear Blue Tuesday (Soundtrack for the Original Musical Movie) (August 2010) by Various Artists. Sh-K-Boom Records. Erin Hill: songwriter, vocals, harp, bass.
- Leave it in the Soup (July 2010) by The Dream Jam Band. Dream Jam Productions, EMI. Produced by Rick Chertoff. Erin Hill: songwriter, vocals, bass, harp, keyboards; arranger on Shoes, co-producer on Melanie the Mermaid
- Four Leaf Clover by Four Celtic Voices with Celeste Ray & Erin Hill (2009) Gridley Records. Erin Hill: songwriter, vocals, harp, bass.
- Vapor by Taylor Barton with Wicked Felina (2006) Green Mirror. Produced by G.E. Smith. Erin Hill: co-writer, vocals, harp, guitar, keyboards, hammered dulcimer.
- The Fantasticks (2006) Ghostlight Records/ Razor and Tie. The new Off-Broadway recording. Erin Hill: harpist.
- Martha Wainwright by Martha Wainwright (2005) Zoe Records. Erin Hill: harpist.
- Pyjama Party by Frederic Buchet (2005) Gridley Records. Erin Hill: producer, co-writer, vocals, harp, accordion, hammered dulcimer, analog synths.
- Frost as Desired by Erin Hill (2002) Gridley Records. Erin Hill: songwriter, vocals, guitars, harp, synths.
- I See a Great City by Clan Chi (2002) Crisnjoco. Erin Hill: vocalist
- Pretty Flowers by The Buddy Scott Trio (2002) Gridley Records. Erin Hill: vocals, executive producer.
- Great Musicals by Various Artists (2001) RCA, BMG Entertainment. Erin Hill: vocals.
- Cradle Will Rock (1999) RCA. Motion picture soundtrack, directed by Tim Robbins. Erin Hill: vocals.
- Cabaret (1998) RCA. The new Broadway cast recording, directed by Sam Mendes. Erin Hill: vocals, harp, flute, saxophone.
- Night of the Hunter (1998) Varèse Sarabande. Erin Hill: vocals.
- Titanic (1997) RCA Victor. The Original Broadway Cast Recording. Erin Hill: vocals.
- Honkytonk Highway (1996) Original Cast Recording. Erin Hill: vocals, harp, fiddle, lap steel, guitar, bass, percussion, keyboards, saxophone.

== Filmography ==
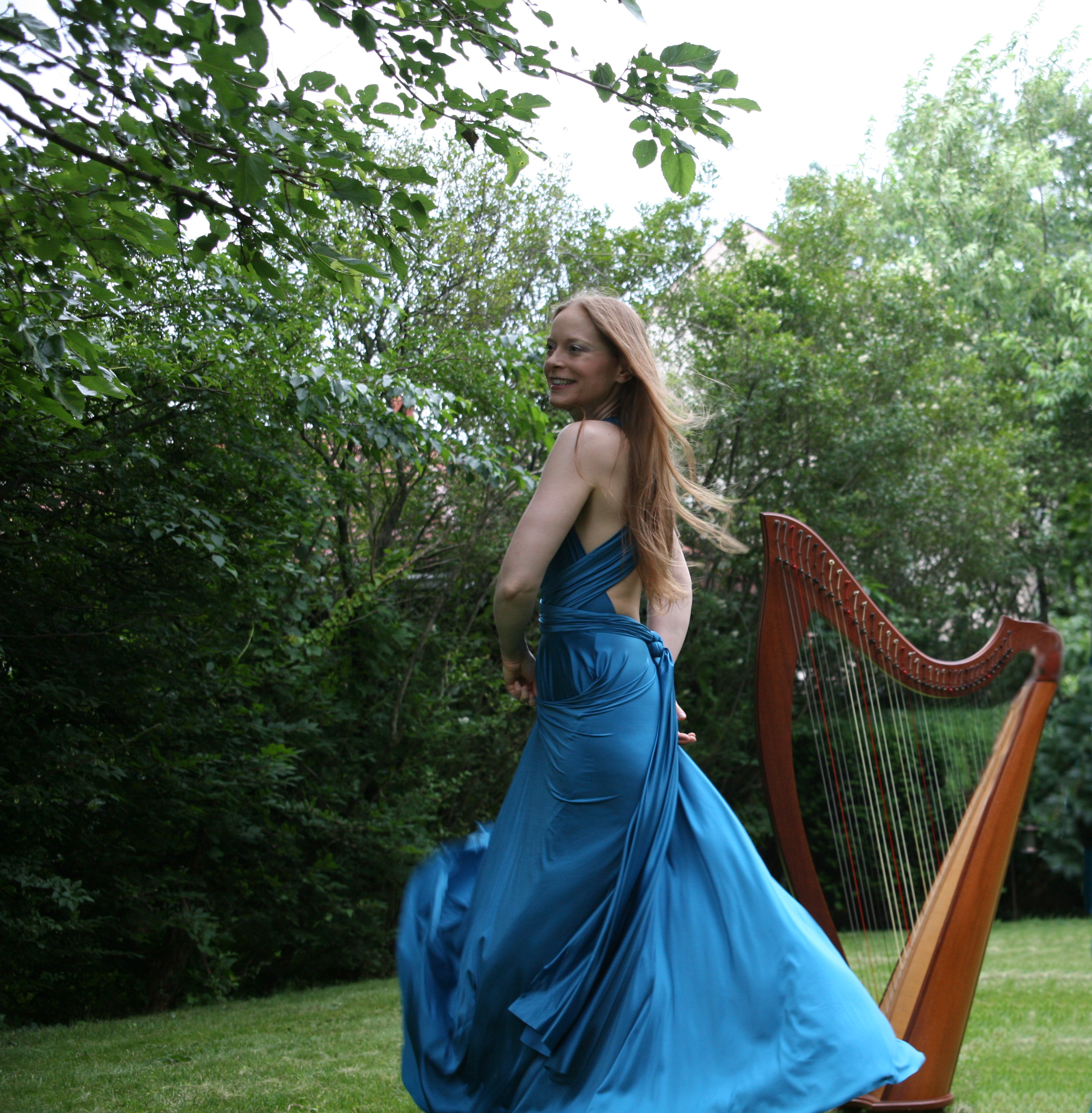
Hill with one of her Celtic harps

Year	Film	Role	Notes
2013	A Day in the Wife	Jenna	directed by Katie Pawluk
2013	Jerome's Bouquet	Good Samaritan #1	directed by Chris Calkins, Bebe Neuwirth
2009	Clear Blue Tuesday	Etta Cummins	also screenwriter and composer
2009	Red Hook	Westie Girl	uncredited
2000	Loser	Dancer / Lulu	uncredited
1999	Cradle Will Rock	Sandra Mescal	directed by Tim Robbins
1993	24 Frames per Second	Susan Tiptree	CINE Eagle Award, IAC Gold

== Television ==
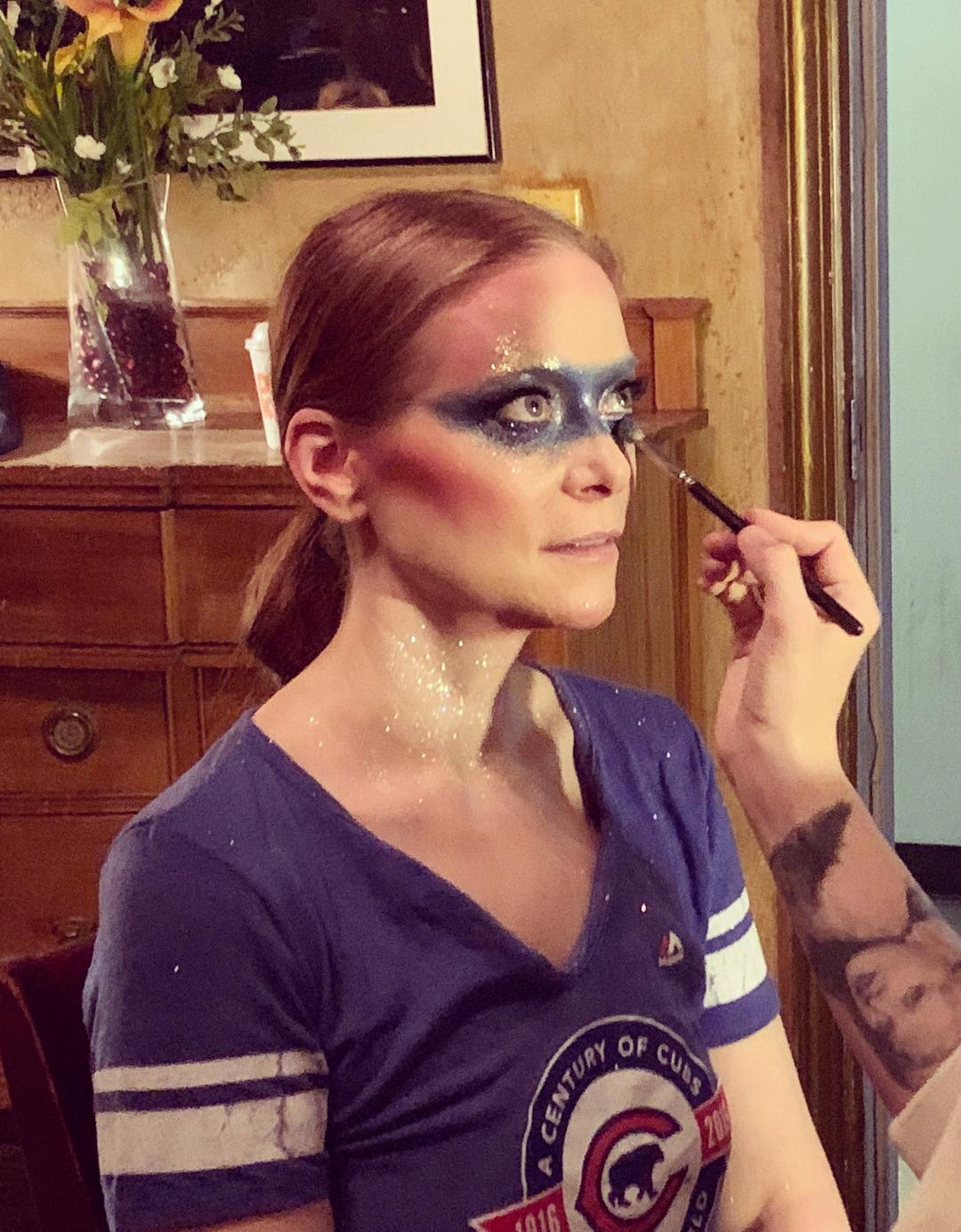
Hill before her Harp Oddity: The Music of David Bowie show at The Cutting Room, NYC, 2019

Year	Title	Role	Notes
2019	The Today Show	herself	harpist & singer for Meghan Markle
2019	Good Morning America	herself	harpist & singer for Meghan Markle
2018	Articulate (TV Series)	herself – singer, duet with Taylor Mac	episode: The Wildest Dreamers
2018	Million Dollar Listing New York (TV Series)	harpist	
2015	Don't Touch Me, Bro	harpist	
2008	The Sunny Side Up Show	Erin the Red	episode: Chica's Big Birthday Surprise!
2007	Live Earth: The Concerts for a Climate Crisis	herself	harpist for Kanye West
2007	Education of Kanye Part 1	herself	harpist
2007	Education of Kanye Part 2	herself	harpist
2007	106 Park & Live	herself	harpist for Kanye West
2007	MTV Total Request Live	herself	harpist for Kanye West
2007	American Masters	Rose of Sharon	episode: Novel Reflections: The American Dream
2006	Christmas in Rockefeller Center	herself	backup singer for Enya
2004	Who Wants to Be a Millionaire	herself	2 episodes
2004	Broadway the American Musical	Sandra Mescal	episode: I Got Plenty o' Nuttin': 1929–1942
2003	Chappelle's Show	Pretty White Lady Singing	Episode 1.2, also wrote the music for the skit
1998	Late Show with David Letterman	Lulu	
1998	The 52nd Annual Tony Awards	Lulu	original Broadway cast of Cabaret
1998	The Rosie O'Donnell Show	herself	2 episodes
1997	60 Minutes	herself/The Devil's Bride in Randy Newman's Faust	episode: TV Land Legends: The 60 Minutes Interviews
1997	Macy's 21st Annual Fourth of July Fireworks Spectacular	Kate Mullins	
1997	The 51st Annual Tony Awards	Kate Mullins	original Broadway cast of Titanic
1992	Another World	Annie	appeared in 7 episodes

== Stage ==
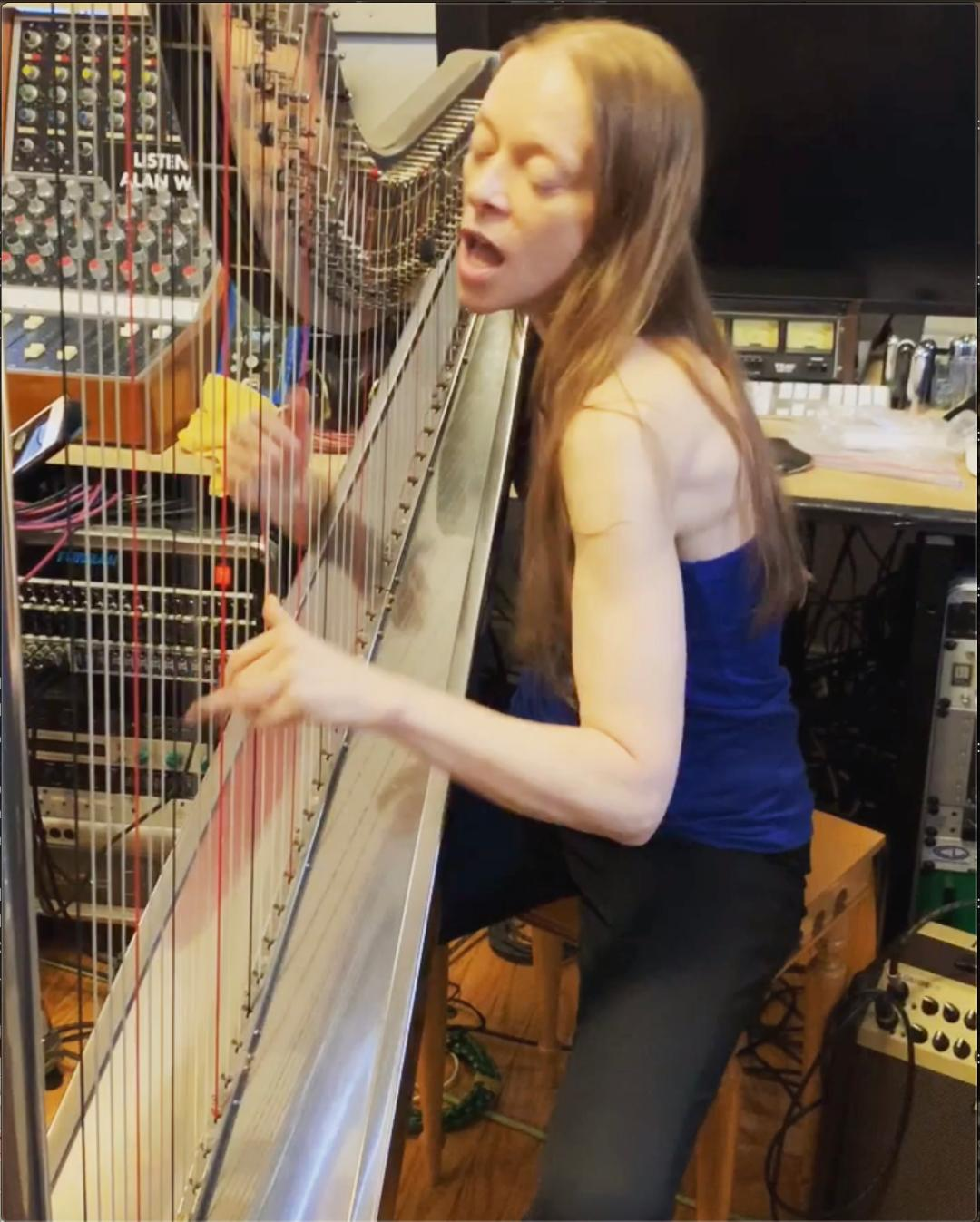
Hill rehearsing in the studio

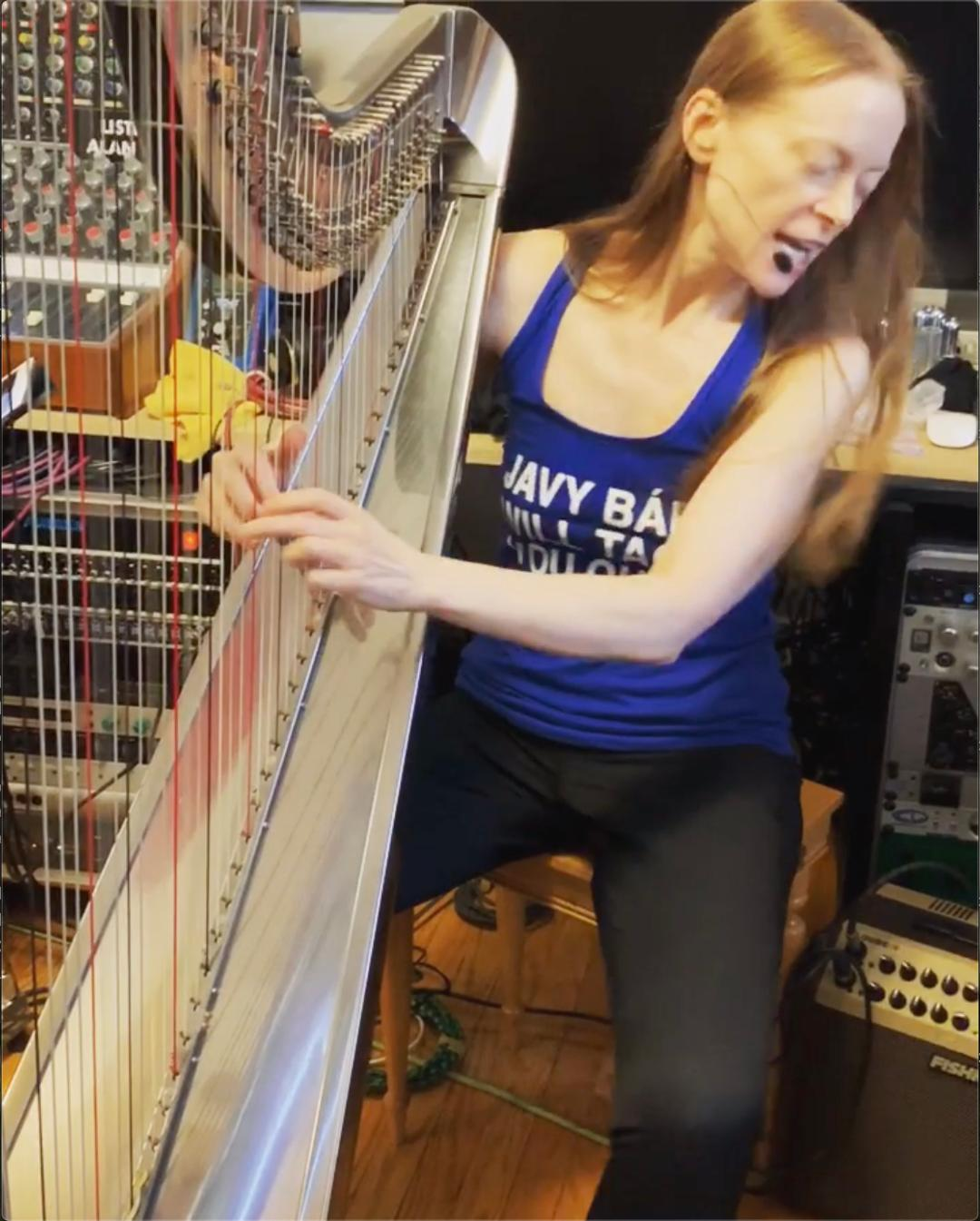
Hill rehearsing in the studio

=== Broadway ===
Year	Production	Role	Notes
2001	Urinetown	Hope, Little Sally (understudy)	Henry Miller Theater, original cast
1998	Cabaret	Lulu	Roundabout, Henry Miller Theater, original cast, directed by Sam Mendes
1997	Titanic	Kate Mullins	Lunt-Fontanne, original cast

=== Off-Broadway and regional theater ===
Year	Production	Role	Notes
2026	I'm Almost There	Harpist, Vocalist	Brooklyn Academy of Music
2013	A Midsummer Night's Dream	First Fairy/Robin Starveling	Classic Stage Company, starring Bebe Neuwirth, Anthony Heald, Christina Ricci
2010	Lincoln Center's South Pacific	Harpist, Rehearsal Pianist	1st National Tour (Los Angeles, Chicago, Seattle, Toronto, etc.)
2010	Lil's 90th	Musical Director	Long Wharf Theater, starring Lois Smith
2008	Lil's 90th	Deirdre	Sundance Theater Lab, starring Lois Smith
2006	The Fantasticks	Harpist	The Jerry Orbach Theater, Snapple Theater Center, the Off-Broadway revival
2006	The Difficulty of Crossing a Field	Mrs. Williamson	Ridge Theater, Alexander Kasser Theater opera
2004	People Are Wrong!	Teri	Vineyard Theatre
2002	When It's Cocktail Time in Cuba	Anya	Cherry Lane Theatre
2001	Largo	Leila	New York Stage and Film, also starring Cyndi Lauper, Fisher Stevens
2000	Spring Awakening	Ilse	Sundance Theater Lab
2000	Night Governess	Chloe	McCarter Theater, world premiere
1999	A Little Night Music	Petra	Repertory Theatre of St. Louis, Great Lakes Theater Festival
1996	Between the Sheets	Lilly	Playwright's Collective, world premiere, by Eduardo Machado
1995	Randy Newman's Faust	The Devil's Bride	Goodman Theater, La Jolla Playhouse, and American Place Theater (Lincoln Center workshop)
1994	Rent	Brenda, Blockbuster Woman, student	New York Theatre Workshop
1994	Night of the Hunter	Ruby	Vineyard Theatre
1993	Honkytonk Highway	Jenine-Kate	Don't Tell Mama, Goodspeed-at-Chester, won Bistro Award

== Screenwriter ==
- (2010) Fade to White
- (2009) Clear Blue Tuesday

== Soundtrack (film and television) ==
- Jes and Lora (Short) (2015) performer: "I'm So Glad", writer: "I'm So Glad"
- That's What She Told Me (2011) composer. writer: "The Jubilation," "Silver Feet," "No Other You." performer: "The Jubilation", "Silver Feet"
- Clear Blue Tuesday (2009) writer, performer: "Prologue", "Reckless". co-writer: "Move High"
- A Mock Time: A Star Trek Wedding (2007) writer: "Intro: Mock's Brain" and "Main Theme: The Bridegroom of Gothos"
- The Shabbos Bigfoot (2006) writer: "Waking Up and No Other You". Performer: "Waking Up and No Other You"
- American Desi (2001) writer: "Lolita (Lo and Behold)". "Performer: Lolita (Lo and Behold)"
- $pent (2000) writer: "Do it Yourself". Performer: "Do it Yourself"
- Bad Bride (2000) (TV) writer, performer: "Waking Up".
- So, What's in Jericho? (1999) performer: "Precious Memories"
- Cradle Will Rock (1999) performer: "Let's Do Something", "The Cradle Will Rock", "Honolulu", "Oh What a Filthy Night Court", "Art for Art's Sake"
- The 52nd Annual Tony Awards (1998) (TV) performer: "Willkommen"
- Macy's 21st Annual Fourth of July Fireworks Spectacular (1997) (TV) "performer: Lady's Maid"
- The 51st Annual Tony Awards (1997) (TV) "performer: Ship of Dreams"
