= Next to Normal =

Broadway musical

- Broadway promotional poster
- Music: Tom Kitt
- Lyrics: Brian Yorkey
- Book: Brian Yorkey
- Productions: 2008 Off-Broadway; 2008 Virginia; 2009 Broadway; 2010 U.S. tour 2023 Off-West End; 2024 West End
- Awards: Tony Award for Best Original Score; Pulitzer Prize for Drama

Next to Normal is a 2008 American rock musical with book and lyrics by Brian Yorkey and music by Tom Kitt. The story centers on a mother who struggles with worsening bipolar disorder and the effects that managing her illness has on her family. The musical addresses grief, depression, suicide, drug abuse, ethics in modern psychiatry, and the underbelly of suburban life.

Before its Off-Broadway debut, Next to Normal received several workshop performances and won the Outer Critics Circle Award for Outstanding New Score and received Drama Desk Awards nominations for Outstanding Actress (Alice Ripley) and Outstanding Score. After its Off-Broadway run, the show played from November 2008 to January 2009 at the Arena Stage while the theater was in its temporary venue in Virginia.

The musical opened on Broadway in April 2009. It was nominated for eleven Tony Awards that year and won three: Best Original Score, Best Orchestration, and Best Performance by a Leading Actress in a Musical for Alice Ripley. It also won the 2010 Pulitzer Prize for Drama, becoming the eighth musical in history to receive the honor. In awarding the prize to Kitt and Yorkey, the Pulitzer Board called the show "a powerful rock musical that grapples with mental illness in a suburban family and expands the scope of subject matter for musicals."

The first U.S. tour launched in November 2010, with Alice Ripley reprising her Broadway role; the tour concluded in July 2011. The Broadway production closed on January 16, 2011, after 20 previews and 734 regular performances. There have been numerous international productions.

== Plot ==
=== Act I ===
Diana Goodman, a suburban mother with bipolar disorder, waits for her teenage son to return home after he has broken curfew. Diana's daughter Natalie is also awake completing her homework. Her son returns home and Diana's husband Dan wakes up, and the family prepares for the day ahead until Diana, disoriented, prepares sandwiches on every surface in the kitchen, including the floor ("Just Another Day").

Natalie, a pianist who hopes to attend the Yale School of Music, laments the stress of being an overachiever while practicing for an upcoming recital in the school music room ("Everything Else"). She runs into her classmate Henry and they bond over their shared love of music. Diana regularly visits her psychiatrist Dr. Fine, who prescribes a series of medications to treat her bipolar disorder that all cause unpleasant side effects. Dan, waiting in the car, mourns the current state of his life and his and Diana's relationship. When Diana says her new medication makes her feel numb and emotionless, Dr. Fine declares her stable ("Who's Crazy?/My Psychopharmacologist and I").

Henry confesses his romantic feelings for Natalie and they start dating ("Perfect for You"). Diana mourns the full spectrum of emotions she once felt and flushes her medications at her son's urging ("I Miss the Mountains"). Henry joins the family for dinner ("It's Gonna Be Good"), but when Diana brings out a cake for her son's 18th birthday, Dan gently reminds her that he died as an infant and her visions of him are delusions ("He's Not Here"). Diana reveals to Dan that she stopped taking her medication and tells him he will never understand the pain she feels ("You Don't Know"). Dan begs her to help him understand, but Diana is torn between the comfort her delusion brings her and confronting the painful reality of his absence ("I Am the One"). Natalie vents to Henry about Diana's attachment to her firstborn child and their strained relationship ("Superboy and the Invisible Girl").

Diana visits a new psychiatrist, Dr. Madden, who agrees to start with talk therapy. Her son reappears and reasserts his control over Diana's life; her delusions disturb her, but she is also comforted by his presence ("I'm Alive"). Diana later tries hypnotherapy with Dr. Madden; she opens up about her son's death and her relationship with Natalie, admitting she had Natalie to be a replacement child and Diana was unable to hold her in the hospital. Meanwhile, Natalie messes up her piano recital after realizing her parents are not there ("Make Up Your Mind/Catch Me I'm Falling"). Dr. Madden encourages Diana to begin getting rid of her son's things, and she has another vision of him ("I Dreamed a Dance"). The vision tells Diana the only way they can be reunited is if she is dead, and she attempts suicide ("There's a World").

Diana survives the suicide attempt, and Dr. Madden tells Dan that due to the severity of Diana's condition, electroconvulsive therapy is among the last treatment options left. Dan reminisces about their relationship and how he has stood by her through everything ("I've Been"), while Diana is furious at the suggestion she undergo ECT ("Didn't I See This Movie?"), Dan convinces Diana that the treatment is a chance to get back to normal, and she reluctantly agrees ("A Light in the Dark").

=== Act II ===
Diana undergoes ECT, while Natalie experiments with drugs and frequently goes clubbing. The two have a shared hallucination ("Wish I Were Here"). When Diana is released from the hospital, she reveals that she has lost her memories from the past 19 years, including her son and daughter. Dan remains optimistic that her memories will return, while Natalie is upset her mother agreed to the treatment in the first place ("Song of Forgetting"). Henry, worried about Natalie's substance use and self-destruction, asks her to the upcoming school dance and she declines ("Hey #1").

Dr. Madden assures Dan that Diana's memory loss from ECT is normal. Dan is hesitant to remind her about their late son, given her mental illness first manifested after the trauma of his death ("Seconds and Years"). The family goes through old photo albums to jog Diana's memory, leaving out any mention of their firstborn ("Better Than Before"). Diana's vision of her son appears and reminds her there is an important part of her life she has forgotten ("Aftershocks"). Henry again asks Natalie to the dance and she again declines, though he says he will come pick her up that night in case she changes her mind ("Hey #2").

At a follow-up visit, Diana tells Dr. Madden she knows there is something important from her past she still can't remember. Dr. Madden, unaware that Dan has been keeping it from her, accidentally reveals the existence of her dead son ("You Don't Know (Reprise)"). Diana returns home and finds her son's music box, and Dan reluctantly reminds her of the circumstances of his death at 18 months old from an intestinal blockage, which all the doctors had missed ("How Could I Ever Forget?") but the confused Diana says she remembers him as a teenager due to having hallucinated him. The couple argue over Dan's insistence that she undergo more ECT and his refusal to tell her their son's name ("It's Gonna Be Good (Reprise)").

Diana asks Dan why he stays with her despite everything her illness has put him through. He reminds her of the vows he took when they married and promises he is committed to her no matter what. Henry, waiting to take Natalie to the dance, pledges the same to her ("Why Stay?/A Promise") and she agrees to go with him. The vision of Diana's son reappears ("I'm Alive (Reprise)") and threatens Diana, telling her the doctors lied to her.

Natalie takes Diana to visit Dr. Madden, telling Henry that she will meet him at the dance later. Diana expresses her frustrations to Dr. Madden that years of treatments haven't helped her and wonders if her grief over her son's death can even be treated ("The Break"). Dr. Madden unsuccessfully pleads with her to continue treatment ("Make Up Your Mind/Catch Me I'm Falling (Reprise)") but she leaves, deciding not to undergo more ECT. Diana and Natalie have a heart-to-heart, noting their similarities ("Maybe (Next to Normal)"). Diana drives Natalie to the dance, where she frets to Henry that she will struggle with her mental health the same way as her mother. Henry promises he will stand by her regardless of what happens in the future ("Hey #3/Perfect for You (Reprise)").

Diana returns home and tells Dan though she loves him, she is leaving, as they each need to grieve their son on their own ("So Anyway"). After she leaves, a devastated Dan finally acknowledges the vision of his late son, and they embrace. For the first and only time in the show, Dan and Diana's son is called by his name: Gabe ("I Am the One (Reprise)").

Natalie returns home from the dance to find her mother gone and her father sitting in the dark. She turns on a lamp, telling Dan, "We need some light." Natalie continues her relationship with Henry, while Diana temporarily moves in with her parents. Dr. Madden recommends another psychiatrist to Dan, so he can begin his own journey of grieving Gabe's death. The cast, including Gabe, acknowledge the difficulty of moving forward but hopeful that they will adjust to the changes in their lives ("Light").

== Characters ==
Note: These descriptions come from the Characters section in the script.

- Diana: "A suburban mother. Sharp. Delusional bipolar depressive. Thirties or forties."
- Gabe: "Diana's son who died as a baby. He comes back to her in visions as a teenager."
- Dan: "Diana's husband. Handsome. Genuine. Constant. Tired. Thirties or forties."
- Natalie: "Diana's daughter. Sixteen and trying to be perfect. It's not going well."
- Henry: "Musician. Romantic. Stoner. Slacker. Philosopher king. Seventeen."
- Doctor Madden: "On the young side of ageless. Assured. A rock star."
- Doctor Fine: A Psychopharmacologist.

== Musical numbers ==
Note: The song titles are not listed in the program

=== 2008 Off-Broadway ===
==== Act I ====
- "Prelude" – Orchestra
- "Preprise – Let There Be Light" – Dan, Natalie, Diana
- "Just Another Day" – Diana, Natalie, Gabe, Dan
- "Everything Else" – Natalie
- "More... And More... And More" – Diana, Natalie, Gabe, Henry, Doctor Madden
- "The Cavalry" – Dan
- "Who's Crazy"/"My Psychopharmacologist and I" – Dan, Doctor Fine, Diana
- "Perfect For You" – Henry, Natalie
- "I Miss the Mountains" – Diana
- "It's Gonna Be Good" – Dan, Natalie, Henry, Diana
- "He's Not Here" – Dan
- "You Don't Know" – Diana
- "I Am the One" – Dan, Gabe, Diana
- "Superboy and the Invisible Girl" – Natalie, Diana, Gabe
- "Open Your Eyes" – Doctor Madden
- "I'm Alive" – Gabe
- "Make Up Your Mind"/"Catch Me I'm Falling" – Doctor Madden, Diana, Dan, Natalie, Gabe, Henry
- "A Good Step" – Orchestra
- "I Dreamed a Dance" – Diana, Gabe
- "There's a World" – Gabe
- "E.C.T." – Orchestra
- "Didn't I See This Movie?" – Diana
- "A Light in the Dark" – Dan, Diana
- "Feeling Electric" – Diana, Gabe, Dan, Doctor Madden, Natalie, Henry

==== Act II ====
- "Growing Up Unstable" – Natalie
- "Song of Forgetting" – Dan, Diana, Natalie
- "Hey #1" – Henry, Natalie
- "Seconds and Years" – Doctor Madden, Dan, Diana
- "Getting Better" – Doctor Madden, Diana, Natalie
- "Aftershocks" – Gabe
- "Hey #2" – Henry, Natalie
- "You Don't Know" (Reprise) – Diana, Doctor Madden
- "Music Box" – Gabe
- "How Could I Ever Forget?" – Diana, Dan
- "It's Gonna Be Good" (Reprise) – Dan, Diana
- "Why Stay?"/"A Promise" – Diana, Natalie, Dan, Henry
- "I'm Alive" (Reprise) – Gabe
- "The Break" – Diana
- "Make Up Your Mind"/"Catch Me I'm Falling" (Reprise) – Doctor Madden, Diana, Gabe
- "Everything" – Diana, Natalie
- "Hey #3"/"Perfect For You" (Reprise) – Henry, Natalie
- "So Anyway" – Diana
- "I Am the One" (Reprise) – Dan, Gabe
- "Finale (Let There Be Light)" – Diana, Dan, Natalie, Gabe, Henry, Doctor Madden

=== 2009 Broadway ===
==== Act I ====
- "Prelude" – Orchestra
- "Just Another Day" – Company
- "Everything Else" – Natalie
- "Who's Crazy"/"My Psychopharmacologist and I" – Dan, Diana, Doctor Fine, Company
- "Perfect for You" – Henry, Natalie
- "I Miss the Mountains" – Diana
- "It's Gonna Be Good" – Dan, Company
- "He's Not Here" – Dan
- "You Don't Know" – Diana
- "I Am the One" – Dan, Gabe, Diana
- "Superboy and the Invisible Girl" – Natalie, Diana, Gabe
- "I'm Alive" – Gabe
- "Make Up Your Mind"/"Catch Me I'm Falling" – Company
- "I Dreamed a Dance" – Diana, Gabe
- "There's a World" – Gabe
- "I've Been" – Dan, Gabe
- "Didn't I See This Movie?" – Diana
- "A Light in the Dark" – Dan, Diana

==== Act II ====
- "Entr'acte" - Orchestra
- "Wish I Were Here" – Diana, Natalie, Company
- "Song of Forgetting" – Dan, Diana, Natalie
- "Hey #1" – Henry, Natalie
- "Seconds and Years" – Doctor Madden, Dan, Diana
- "Better Than Before" – Doctor Madden, Dan, Natalie, Diana
- "Aftershocks" – Gabe, Diana
- "Hey #2" – Henry, Natalie
- "You Don't Know" (Reprise) – Diana, Doctor Madden
- "How Could I Ever Forget?" – Diana, Dan
- "It's Gonna Be Good" (Reprise) – Dan, Diana
- "Why Stay?"/"A Promise" – Diana, Natalie, Dan, Henry
- "I'm Alive" (Reprise) – Gabe
- "The Break" – Diana
- "Make Up Your Mind"/"Catch Me I'm Falling" (Reprise) – Doctor Madden, Diana, Gabe
- "Maybe (Next to Normal)" – Diana, Natalie
- "Hey #3"/"Perfect for You" (Reprise) – Henry, Natalie
- "So Anyway" – Diana
- "I Am the One" (Reprise) – Dan, Gabe
- "Light" – Company

== Cast Recordings ==
On May 5, 2009, Ghostlight Records Inc. released Next to Normal (Original Broadway Cast Recording) on streaming platforms and as a CD, featuring the performers and orchestrations of the 2009 production.

For the show's 15th anniversary, the album was remastered with Tom Kitt's oversight, reusing the original vocal performances by the Broadway cast.

On May 30, 2025, Next to Normal (Original London Cast Recording) was released on streaming platforms, featuring vocal performances and orchestrations from the professionally filmed performance of the 2024 West End production. The album would get a physical release as a two-CD set on February 27, 2026.

== Depiction of mental illness ==
=== Bipolar disorder ===
Next to Normal follows the struggle of one woman, Diana Goodman, with mental illness and the effect of the illness on her whole family. In the second act, these effects are at times diminished and other times exacerbated by the fact that Diana additionally suffers memory loss following electroconvulsive therapy (ECT). Kitt and Yorkey began writing the musical in 2002 and continued through 2008, but there have since been changes in the understanding and treatment of bipolar depressive disorder. In the show, Diana's doctor describes her as a "bipolar depressive with delusional episodes", however, the most recent edition of the American Psychiatric Association's Diagnostic and Statistical Manual of Mental Disorders (DSM) would now diagnose Diana as bipolar "with psychotic features", referring to the hallucinations she experiences, such as of her dead son Gabe in the form of a teenager. The disorder is also now separated into bipolar types I and II.

=== Treatment ===
Bipolar disorder is a disorder of both mania (or hypomania) and depression that is not curable, mostly treated through psychopharmacological, psychotherapeutic, and biological means. First, are the psychopharmacological therapies, commonly known as drug therapies, which involves the use of antipsychotic, anticonvulsant, and antidepressant medications, that aim to stabilize the patient's mood. Such drugs include lithium salts (mood stabilizers) and Ativan and Valium (benzodiazepines), all of which are mentioned in the lyrics, particularly in the song "My Psychopharmacologist and I", in which Diana is prescribed a plethora of different drugs at once, which are mentioned alongside their side-effects, ranging from drowsiness to sexual dysfunction. Another form of treatment the play explores is psychotherapy, where patients talk to psychologists or licensed mental health professionals and aim to work through the psychological component of their disease through conversation; Diana's psychiatrist leads her through a guided meditation or hypnotherapeutic approach. The third form addressed is electroconvulsive therapy (ECT) in which seizures are induced by sending an electric current through the brain. Following a suicide attempt, Diana is convinced to undergo ECT and then loses her memory (including her memory of Gabe), which she slowly gains back in talks with her family. ECT is often viewed as a last-resort option for depressed patients who are incredibly ill and extremely treatment-resistant or whose symptoms include very serious suicidal or psychotic symptoms, or for pregnant women. This practice holds true in the play, in which ECT is only recommended after Diana's hallucination of Gabe suggests that she kill herself in the song "There's a World".

== Productions ==
=== Development ===
The musical began in 1998 as a 10-minute workshop sketch about a woman undergoing electroshock therapy, and its impact on her family, called Feeling Electric. Yorkey brought the idea to Kitt while both were at the BMI Lehman Engel Musical Theatre Workshop. Kitt wrote a rock score for the short piece, which was highly critical of the medical treatment. Both Yorkey and Kitt turned to other projects, but they "kept returning to Feeling Electric", eventually expanding it to a full-length musical. This had a reading in 2002 at Village Theatre in Issaquah, Washington, then at several venues in New York City, with a cast that included Norbert Leo Butz as Dan, Sherie Rene Scott as Diana, Benjamin Schrader as Gabe, Anya Singleton as Natalie and Greg Naughton as Dr. Madden. A subsequent staged reading was held in late 2002 at the Musical Mondays Theater Lab in New York.

In 2005 it was workshopped again at Village Theatre starring Amy Spanger as Diana, Jason Collins as Dan, Mary Faber as Natalie and Deven May as Dr. Madden. In September 2005, the musical ran at the New York Musical Theatre Festival, with Spanger as Diana, Joe Cassidy as Dan, Annaleigh Ashford as Natalie, Benjamin Schrader as Gabe and Anthony Rapp as Dr. Madden. This attracted the attention of producer David Stone. Second Stage Theatre then workshopped the piece in both 2006 and 2007, featuring Cassidy and then Gregg Edelman as Dan, Alice Ripley as Diana, Mary Faber and then Phoebe Strole as Natalie, Rapp as Dr. Madden/Dr. Fine and Skylar Astin as Henry. Meanwhile, at the urging of Stone and director Michael Greif, who had joined the team, the creators focused the show on the family's pain rather than on the critique of the medical establishment.

=== Off-Broadway and Virginia (2008–2009) ===
Next to Normal was first produced Off-Broadway at the Second Stage Theatre from January 16 through March 16, 2008, directed by Greif, with Anthony Rapp as assistant director and musical staging by Sergio Trujillo. The cast featured Ripley as Diana, Brian d'Arcy James as Dan, Aaron Tveit as Gabe, Jennifer Damiano as Natalie, Adam Chanler-Berat as Henry and Asa Somers as Dr. Madden/Dr. Fine. The surname of the family was changed from Brown to Goodman. Although the show received mixed reviews, at least one reviewer criticized it for pushing an irresponsible message about the treatment of bipolar disorder and for failing to strike the proper balance between pathos and comedy. The critics found the show internally confused, and the team decided to make major changes in both the book and score, including eliminating the original title song, "Feeling Electric". They concentrated the story entirely on the emotions of Diana and her family as they confront bitter truths.

The re-written musical was given a regional theatre production at the Arena Stage (normally in Washington, D.C. but operating in Virginia during a renovation of its main facility), from November 21, 2008, through January 18, 2009, under the direction of Greif. J. Robert Spencer took over the role of Dan while Louis Hobson assumed the roles of Dr. Madden/Dr. Fine; the remaining Off-Broadway leads returned. The production received rave reviews, with critics noticing that "comic songs and glitzy production numbers" had been replaced by songs that complemented the emotional content of the book.

=== Broadway (2009–2011) ===
Next to Normal began previews on Broadway at the Booth Theatre on March 27, 2009, with an opening night of April 15. The entire cast from the Arena Stage production returned, once again under the direction of Greif. The musical was originally booked for the larger Longacre Theatre, but, according to producer David Stone, "When the Booth Theatre became available... we knew it was the right space for Next to Normal".

Reviews were very favorable. Ben Brantley of The New York Times wrote that the Broadway production is "A brave, breathtaking musical. It is something much more than a feel-good musical: it is a feel-everything musical." Rolling Stone called it "The best new musical of the season – by a mile." Next to Normal was on the Ten Best of the Year list for 2009 of "Curtain Up".

The show set a brand new box office record at the Booth Theatre for the week ending January 3, 2010, grossing $550,409 over nine performances. The previous record was held by the 2006 production of Brian Friel's Faith Healer, with a gross of $530,702. One year later, Next to Normal broke that record again during its final week on Broadway (week ending January 16, 2011) grossing $552,563 over eight performances. The producers recouped their initial investment of $4 million a few days after the production's one-year anniversary on Broadway. At the end of its run, Next to Normal grossed $31,764,486, the most out of all the shows that have run at the Booth Theatre, earning double the amount of money as its closest competition, I'm Not Rappaport.

Cast replacements during the run included Marin Mazzie as Diana, Brian d'Arcy James and later Jason Danieley as Dan, Kyle Dean Massey as Gabe, and Meghann Fahy as Natalie. John Kenrick wrote in November 2010 that the show "is glowing with breathtaking brilliance as it ends its Broadway run."

The Broadway production closed on January 16, 2011, after 21 previews and 733 regular performances.

==== Twitter promotional campaign ====
In May 2009, about six weeks into the Broadway run, Next to Normal began publishing an adapted version of the script over Twitter, the social media network. Over 35 days, the serialized version of the show was published, a single line from a character at a time. The Twitter promotion ended the morning of June 7, 2009, the morning of the 63rd Tony Awards. The initiative earned the musical the 2009 OMMA Award for Best in Show.

=== First U.S. tour (2010–2011) ===
Next to Normal began its first national tour of North America and Canada at the Ahmanson Theatre in Los Angeles, California on November 23, 2010. The tour played in 16 cities in the U.S., ending in Toronto, Ontario, Canada on July 30, 2011. Alice Ripley reprised her role as Diana and was joined by Asa Somers as Dan, Emma Hunton as Natalie, Curt Hansen as Gabe, Preston Sadleir as Henry and Jeremy Kushnier as Dr. Madden/Dr. Fine.

=== East West Players (2017) ===
East West Players produced a diverse and inclusive version of the musical featuring a cast with nearly all artists of color as a part of their 51st season under the direction of Nancy Keystone. The production was originally slated to run from May 12 to June 11, 2018, but was extended a week through June 28 due to high demand. The show's popularity carried into awards season, earning the production four of the major awards at the 2018 Ovation Awards including Best Production of a Musical (Large Theater), Best Featured Actress in a Musical, Best Lead Actress in a Musical, and Direction in a Musical; additionally, the Set/Projection Designer for the show, Hana Kim, was honored with the Sherwood Award which seeks "to nurture innovative and adventurous theatre artists working in Los Angeles." Deedee Magno Hall played the leading role of Diana alongside her real-life husband Cliffton Hall, who played Diana's husband, Dan. Isa Briones won for her portrayal of Natalie.

The show was praised for its subject matter and the way in which the musical's exploration of mental health tied in seamlessly with its all-Asian cast. Mental health awareness is particularly stigmatized within areas of the Asian Pacific-Islander community as a result of conflicting cultural and familial emphases. East West Players' producing artistic director Snehal Desai made a point to belabor the importance of "shedding light on the stigma of mental illness in our communities," and that he hoped that the production could create "a space for that conversation."

=== TheaterWorks Hartford (2017) ===
TheaterWorks Hartford (TWH) ran a production of the show under the direction of Rob Ruggiero. The show originally ran from March 24 through April 30 before extending through May 14 of the same year in light of its great success. The show starred Christiane Noll as Diana Goodman, alongside David Harris as Dan Goodman. The cast also included Maya Keleher, John Cardoza, J.D. Daw, and Nick Sacks. The production garnered 10 nominations for the 2017 Connecticut Critic Circle Choice Awards, and won the awards for Outstanding Production of a Musical, Outstanding Actress in a Musical (Noll), Outstanding Director of a Musical, Outstanding Lighting, and Outstanding Debut (Keleher).

Joseph Harrison of BroadwayWorld wrote that the production "goes beyond entertainment, reaching in and touching you to your very core in a brilliant symphony of emotional energy." The Hartford Courant praised the show for "being done with such careful thought and expressive detail in such an intimate environment raises this already confrontational musical to a different level of emotional intensity" and praised Noll for being "a fearless performer [who] can switch from indomitability to vulnerability in a split second."

=== Kennedy Center (2020) ===
Rachel Bay Jones, Brandon Victor Dixon, Maia Reficco, Khamary Rose, Ben Levi Ross and Michael Park, joined original Broadway director Michael Greif for the Broadway Center Stage production at the John F. Kennedy Center for the Performing Arts in Washington, D.C. from January 29—February 3, 2020.

=== Donmar Warehouse (2023) and West End (2024) ===
In October 2022, it was announced that the show would receive its London premiere at the Donmar Warehouse, in a new production directed by Michael Longhurst. In January 2023, it was announced that Caissie Levy would play the lead role of Diana Goodman. The cast included Jamie Parker as Dan, Jack Wolfe as Gabe, Eleanor Worthington-Cox as Natalie, Trevor Dion Nicholas as Dr. Madden/Dr. Fine, and Jack Ofrecio as Henry. The production ran from August 12 until October 7, 2023, over 15 years after it first premiered in New York.

In November 2023, it was announced that the 2023 Donmar Warehouse production would transfer to London's West End in 2024. The show began its 14-week limited engagement on June 18 at the Wyndham's Theatre, with an official opening night on June 26, and it closed on September 21. The entire cast reprised their roles. The production was filmed from September 9 through 11. The filmed version with censorship aired on PBS' Great Performances on May 9, 2025 in the United States and was released in UK cinemas uncensored on September 11 and 14, 2025. On May 30, 2025, the cast album version of the West End cast was released using the live audio featured in the filmed performance.

=== Edinburgh Festival Fringe (2026) ===
Edinburgh-based theatre company Bare Productions is scheduled to stage a production of Next to Normal at The Sanctuary, Paradise Green, during the Edinburgh Festival Fringe in Edinburgh, from 7 to 15 August 2026. The production is directed by Dominic Whitefield-Holbrook, with musical direction by Finlay Turnbull.

The announced principal cast comprises Brikaih Flore as Diana Goodman, Greg McCafferty as Dan Goodman, Kelsey Ann MacKenzie as Natalie Goodman, Zac McGuire as Gabe Goodman, Oliver Hall as Henry and William Jackson as Dr Madden. The production also features understudy performances by Emily Copas as Diana, Gregor Robertson as Dan, Rebecca Drever as Natalie, Guy Bathgate as Gabe, and Youssef Basir as Henry and Dr Madden.

== International ==
Note: The following are independent productions of the musical produced internationally and in most cases, in that native language. They also feature the original music, lyrics and book, but changes in other aspects including direction, set design, costume design and choreography.

=== Nordic countries ===
The European premiere and the first non-English language production opened in September 2010 at Det Norske Teatret in Oslo, Norway under the direction of Svein Sturla Hungnes. The cast included Heidi Gjermundsen Broch as Diana and Charlotte Frogner as Natalie Broch received the 2011 Hedda Award (Norway's highest theatrical accolade) for her portrayal. This production was later re-staged for a Swedish premiere at the Wermland Opera A Finnish production opened in December 2010 in Helsinki, Finland at Studio Pasila, where it ran for one year. A Swedish-language production opened in September 2012 at Wasa Teater in Vaasa, Finland. The cast included Anna-Maria Hallgarn as Diana. Another Finnish-language production was staged at the Tampere Workers' Theatre from October 2012 through February 2013. A Danish-language production ran from February 2012 until April 2012 at Nørrebro Teater in Copenhagen, Denmark. A Swedish-language production opened at Swedish Theatre in Helsinki in November 2021 and ran until March 2022. The show premiered again in Sweden in 2022, after being postponed due to the COVID-19 pandemic, at Uppsala City Theatre with Helen Sjöholm as Diana. In 2023 Next to normal had a sold out run at Teater Västernorrland with Kristina Lindgren as Diana. A second Danish-language production opened at Odense Teater December 2024 and ran until January 2025.

=== Asia ===
==== Philippines ====
The Asian premiere was staged at the Carlos P. Romulo Auditorium, RCBC Plaza, Makati, Philippines in March 2011 and again in October 2011, performed in English, re-imagined by director Bobby Garcia. The cast included Pilipinas Got Talent star Markki Stroem as Henry, Menchu Lauchengco-Yulo as Diana, Jett Pangan as Dan, Bea Garcia as Natalie, Felix Rivera as Gabe, and Jake Macapagal as Doctor Madden.

==== South Korea ====
Soon after The Philippines premiere, a replica of the Broadway production, under the Broadway production's associate director Laura Pietropinto, premiered at Seoul, South Korea's Doosan Art Center in November 2011 performed in Korean. The production starred renown American actor/musical artist Kolleen Park as Diana, and local actors Kim Ji-hyun alternating the role with Park, Nam Kyung-joo and Lee Jung-yeol sharing the role of Dan, Choi Jae-rim and Han Ji-sang as Gabe, Oh So-yeon as Natalie, and Lee Sang-min as Henry. Since then the show had four local productions, each in 2011, 2013, 2015, and 2022 and in each, Park reprised her role as Diana.

==== Japan ====
A replica of the Broadway production, directed by the Broadway Assistant Director Laura Pietropinto, premiered in Tokyo in July 2013 in Japanese. The dual cast included Gen Parton Shin as Gabe.

==== Singapore ====
A new version of the show, directed by Tracie Pang, premiered in Singapore in September 2013 in English at the Drama Centre Theatre. The cast included Sally Ann Triplett as Diana, Adrian Pang as Dan, Julia Abueva as Natalie, Nathan Hartono as Gabe, Linden Furnell as Henry, and Juan Jackson as Doctor Madden.

==== China ====
A non-replica Chinese production premiered in Beijing, China, on August 3, 2018, at Dongcheng's Super Theatre in Mandarin and transferred to Shanghai that December. The first Cantonese-language production took place in Hong Kong, premiering in December 2022 at the City Hall Theater.

==== Taiwan ====
The original Taiwan production premiered in July 2023 in English the National Taichung Theater, directed and re-imagined by Carolyn Sun. The cast featured Chi, who played Natalie in the Beijing company, returning to the role, American actors Ya Han Chang as Diana and Ellis Gage as Gabe, local actors ERay Chiang as Dan and Sassoon Yang and Henry as well as Taiwan radio and television personality Francis Chia as Dr. Madden.

=== Australia ===
The Australian premiere of the musical by the Melbourne Theatre Company was staged in Melbourne, Australia. Performances began on April 28, 2012, and ran through June 4 (extended from May 28). The cast included Kate Kendall as Diana, Matt Hetherington as Dan and Bert LaBonte as Dr. Madden/Dr. Fine.

A production in Perth played at the Heath Ledger Theatre from November 5–19, 2015. Produced by Black Swan State Theatre Company, the cast included Rachael Beck as Diana and Brendan Hanson as Dan.

Australia's first musical theatre performance since the start of the COVID-19 pandemic is a new production of Next to Normal directed by Darren Yap and choreographed by Kelley Abbey. The performance will run in October and November at the National Institute of Dramatic Art in Sydney.

The most recent production was scheduled to be performed at Chapel Off Chapel in Melbourne from 15 July 2021. The cast included Queenie van de Zandt as Diana, Tyran Parke as Dan, Melanie Bird as Natalie, Sam Richardson as Gabe, Liam Wigney as Henry and Ross Chisari as Dr. Madden/Dr. Fine. The show was presented by the James Terry Collective. Due to the snap COVID-19 pandemic lockdown, they were only able to perform one show at that time, resuming nearly eight months later in March 2022 with Hanlon Innocent alternating with Tomáš Kantor as Henry and Matt Hetherington reprising the role of Dan.

=== South America ===
A Spanish-language Peruvian premiere of the musical played the Teatro Marsano, in Lima, Peru. The production ran from May to June 2011. The cast included Gisela Ponce de León as Natalie A Brazilian production opened in July 2012 at the Clara Nunes Theatre in Rio de Janeiro, under the title Quase Normal starring actress Vanessa Gerbelli as Diana.

A Mexican production opened at the Teatro Aldama in Mexico City on January 31, 2019, starring Susana Zabaleta as Diana. The Mexican cast also included Federico Di Lorenzo as Dan, María Penella as Natalie, Mariano Palacios as Gabe, Jerry Velázquez as Henry/Gabe and Héctor Berzunza as Dr. Madden/Dr. Fine. The cast was also joined by María Chacón as Natalie, and Rodolfo Zarco as Henry for some performances. Directed by Diego Del Río, the creative team included Jorge Ballina (set design), Victor Zapatero (lighting design), Josefina Echeverría (costume design) and Alejandro García (sound design). This production was nominated for six awards in several categories at the Premios Metropolitanos de Teatro in 2019, which included Best Musical, Best Direction of a Musical, among others. Diego del Río, Susana Zabaleta, María Penella and Jerry Velázquez each won at their categories. After a short run in Mexico City, the musical had a single tour performance at Auditorio Luis Elizondo, in Monterrey on July 4, 2019. The original cast reunited on June 9, 2020, for an online live concert, where they read and sang through the score in an acoustic version of the musical.

In Argentina, it premiered on January 5, 2012, at the Liceo Theatre in Buenos Aires under the title Casi Normales. Produced by Javier Faroni and starring Laura Conforte as Diana, Alejandro Paker as Dan, Florencia Otero as Natalie, Matías Mayer as Gabe, Fernando Dente as Henry, and Mariano Chiesa as Dr. Madden/Dr. Fine, this version was directed by Luis Romero, with set design by Marcelo Valiente, costume design by Pablo Bataglia, lighting design by Marco Pastorino, sound design by Rodrigo Lavecchia and Mauro Agrelo, musical direction by Gaby Goldman, and Spanish adaptation by Marcelo Kotliar, Pablo del Campo, and Diego Jaraz. Martin Ruiz has played Dan ever since 2013.

=== Caribbean ===
This musical was first presented in Santo Domingo, Dominican Republic, in 2019. It was produced by the renowned entrepreneur and producer Camilo Then and the experienced theater producer and director Joyce Roy, at the former Studio Theater of Acrópolis Center. The cast included Laura Leclerc as Diana, the Dominican actor and singer Alejandro Espino as Daniel, Juan Manuel González as Gabriel, Annabelle Aquino as Natalie, Jean Luis Burgos as Henry, and Vladimir Rodriguez Santana as Dr. Madden / Dr. Fine. Joyce Roy was the general director, Hari Solano was the musical director, and Claudia González was the vocal director. Years later, in 2023, the musical was staged again in the country with the same directors but under Joyce Roy's production. This time, Laura Leclerc, Alejandro Espino, and Juan Manuel González reprised their roles as Diana, Daniel, and Gabriel, respectively. Cynthia Brens joined the cast as Natalie, Lenchy Vargas as Henry, and Alejandro Guerrero as Dr. Madden / Dr. Fine.

=== Canada ===
Mirvish Productions presented the Musical Stage Company production at the CAA Theatre in 2019. The production starred Ma-Anne Dionisio as Diana, Troy Adams as Dan, Brandon Antonio as Gabe, Nathan Carroll as Henry, Stephanie Sy as Natalie, and Louise Pitre as Dr Madden / Dr Fine. The preview period was cut short due to an illness in the cast and began performances one week late on April 26, closing May 19.

=== Europe ===
The Dutch premiere took place on January 16, 2012, at DeLaMar Theater in Amsterdam. The cast included Simone Kleinsma as Diana. A German-language production translated and directed by Titus Hoffmann opened at the Stadttheater in Fürth, Bavaria, on October 11, 2013. Pia Douwes starred in the role of Diana with Thomas Borchert as Dan and Sabrina Weckerlin as Natalie. The Italian version, produced by STM and directed by Marco Iacomelli, opened on March 7, 2015, at Teatro Coccia in Novara. A Spanish-language production opened at the Teatro Pérez Galdós in Las Palmas, Canary Islands, on September 14, 2017, starring Nina as Diana, and then it toured through Spain with stops at Barcelona, Bilbao, and Madrid. In 2016, in Portugal, opened a Portuguese-speaking version, with the title Quase Normal. A Russian-language production (Недалеко от Нормы), directed by Anastasia Grinenko, opened in Minsk, Belarus on March 28, 2018, with Svetlana Matsievskaia starring as Diana. In Poland the show opened on April 6, 2019, at Teatr Syrena in Warsaw, with Katarzyna Walczak as Diana. The production was translated and directed by Jacek Mikołajczyk. The musical had its UK premiere at the Donmar Warehouse, London from 12 August to 7 October 2023, directed by Michael Longhurst. It transferred to the West End's Wyndham's Theatre in 2024. A swiss-german adaptation is expected to play in Zurich under the name 'Fascht Normal. The musical premiered in Bucharest, Romania on March 6, 2021, and has run until 2026. The Romanian edition is directed by Victor Bucur, translated by Geanina Jinaru-Doboș; and takes place at the Ion Dacian National Operetta and Musical Theatre. The Romanian edition has included Theodor Andrei as Henry.

== Casts ==
Note: Below are the principal casts of all official major productions of the musical.

Role	Off-Broadway	Broadway	U.S. National Tour	West End
Role	2008	2009	2010	2024
Diana Goodman	Alice Ripley	Alice Ripley	Alice Ripley	Caissie Levy
Dan Goodman	Brian d'Arcy James	J. Robert Spencer	Asa Somers	Jamie Parker
Natalie Goodman	Jennifer Damiano	Jennifer Damiano	Emma Hunton	Eleanor Worthington-Cox
Gabe Goodman	Aaron Tveit	Aaron Tveit	Curt Hansen	Jack Wolfe
Henry	Adam Chanler-Berat	Adam Chanler-Berat	Preston Sadleir	Jack Ofrecio
Dr. Madden/Dr. Fine	Asa Somers	Louis Hobson	Jeremy Kushnier	Trevor Dion Nicholas

Broadway replacements

- Gabe Goodman: Kyle Dean Massey
- Dan Goodman: Brian d'Arcy James, Jason Danieley
- Diana Goodman: Marin Mazzie
- Natalie Goodman: Meghann Fahy

== Literary references and allusions ==
- During Act I, Gabe reads a paperback copy of The Catcher in the Rye. Salinger's novel about grieving a loss is read by the character who is the loss. In Catcher, Holden struggles with the loss of a brother, Allie, who died of leukemia.
- When sorting through a box of items from her son's room, Diana picks up a music box from the box to reveal a copy of Goodnight Moon underneath, a book for children she never got to read to her son because he died as an infant.
- Natalie carries a hardcover copy of Flowers for Algernon, which she is studying in school. Both the novel and Next to Normal deal with psychological experimentation.
- Diana alludes to One Flew Over the Cuckoo's Nest, Sylvia Plath, and Frances Farmer in the song "Didn't I See This Movie?". This is in regards to her ECT that also takes place in the movie as a form of abuse, provoking questions as to whether Diana is a reliable narrator or whether the ECT is ethical.
- Diana also reads from Who's Afraid of Virginia Woolf?, a play by Edward Albee which deals with marital stress caused by issues similar to some in Next to Normal. On her YouTube site, Alice Ripley said that she uses Albee's play as a Bible, drawing inspiration for Diana.

== Pulitzer Prize controversy ==
Next to Normal won the 2010 Pulitzer Prize for Drama although it was not on the shortlist of three candidates submitted to the twenty-member Pulitzer Prize board by the five-member Drama jury. Jury chairman and critic Charles McNulty publicly criticized the Board for overlooking three plays (Bengal Tiger at the Baghdad Zoo, The Elaborate Entrance of Chad Deity, and In the Next Room (or The Vibrator Play)), which were not running on Broadway at the time of the Award, in favor of one that was.

== Major awards and nominations ==
=== Original Off-Broadway production ===
Year	Award Ceremony	Category	Nominee	Result
2008	Drama League Awards	Distinguished Production of a Musical		Nominated
2008	Drama League Awards	Distinguished Performance Award	Brian d'Arcy James	Nominated
2008	Drama Desk Award	Outstanding Actress in a Musical	Alice Ripley	Nominated
2008	Drama Desk Award	Outstanding Music	Tom Kitt	Nominated
2008	Outer Critics Circle Awards	Outstanding Actress in a Musical	Alice Ripley	Nominated
2008	Outer Critics Circle Awards	Outstanding New Off-Broadway Musical		Nominated
2008	Outer Critics Circle Awards	Outstanding New Score		Won
2008	The Lucille Lortel Awards	Outstanding Musical		Nominated
2008	The Lucille Lortel Awards	Outstanding Featured Actor	Aaron Tveit	Nominated
2008	The Lucille Lortel Awards	Outstanding Lighting Design	Kevin Adams	Nominated

=== Original Virginia production ===
Year	Award Ceremony	Category	Nominee	Result
2009	Helen Hayes Awards	Outstanding Non-Resident Production		Won
2009	Helen Hayes Awards	Outstanding Lead Actress, Non-Resident Production	Alice Ripley	Won
2009	Helen Hayes Awards	Outstanding Lead Actor, Non-Resident Production	J. Robert Spencer	Nominated
2009	Helen Hayes Awards	Outstanding Supporting Performer, Non-Resident Production	Jennifer Damiano	Nominated
2009	Helen Hayes Awards	Outstanding Supporting Performer, Non-Resident Production	Aaron Tveit	Won

=== Original Broadway production ===
Year	Award Ceremony	Category	Nominee	Result
2009	Tony Awards	Best Musical		Nominated
2009	Tony Awards	Best Book of a Musical	Brian Yorkey	Nominated
2009	Tony Awards	Best Original Score	Tom Kitt and Brian Yorkey	Won
2009	Tony Awards	Best Actor in a Musical	J. Robert Spencer	Nominated
2009	Tony Awards	Best Actress in a Musical	Alice Ripley	Won
2009	Tony Awards	Best Featured Actress in a Musical	Jennifer Damiano	Nominated
2009	Tony Awards	Best Direction of a Musical	Michael Greif	Nominated
2009	Tony Awards	Best Orchestrations	Michael Starobin and Tom Kitt	Won
2009	Tony Awards	Best Scenic Design	Mark Wendland	Nominated
2009	Tony Awards	Best Lighting Design	Kevin Adams	Nominated
2009	Tony Awards	Best Sound Design	Brian Ronan	Nominated
2010	Pulitzer Prize for Drama			Won

=== Original London production ===
Year	Award Ceremony	Category	Nominee	Result
2024	Laurence Olivier Awards	Best New Musical		Nominated
2024	Laurence Olivier Awards	Best Actress in a Musical	Caissie Levy	Nominated
2024	Laurence Olivier Awards	Best Actor in a Supporting Role in a Musical	Jack Wolfe	Nominated
2024	Laurence Olivier Awards	Best Actress in a Supporting Role in a Musical	Eleanor Worthington Cox	Nominated

== Representation in other media ==
In 2021, the songs of the musical were the focus of "Chapter Ninety-Four: Next to Normal", a musical episode of Riverdale. The Riverdale cast album of the musical was produced via WaterTower Music.
