= Palma Arena =

Sports venue in Palma, Spain

Coordinates: 39°35′17.26″N 2°38′35.05″E

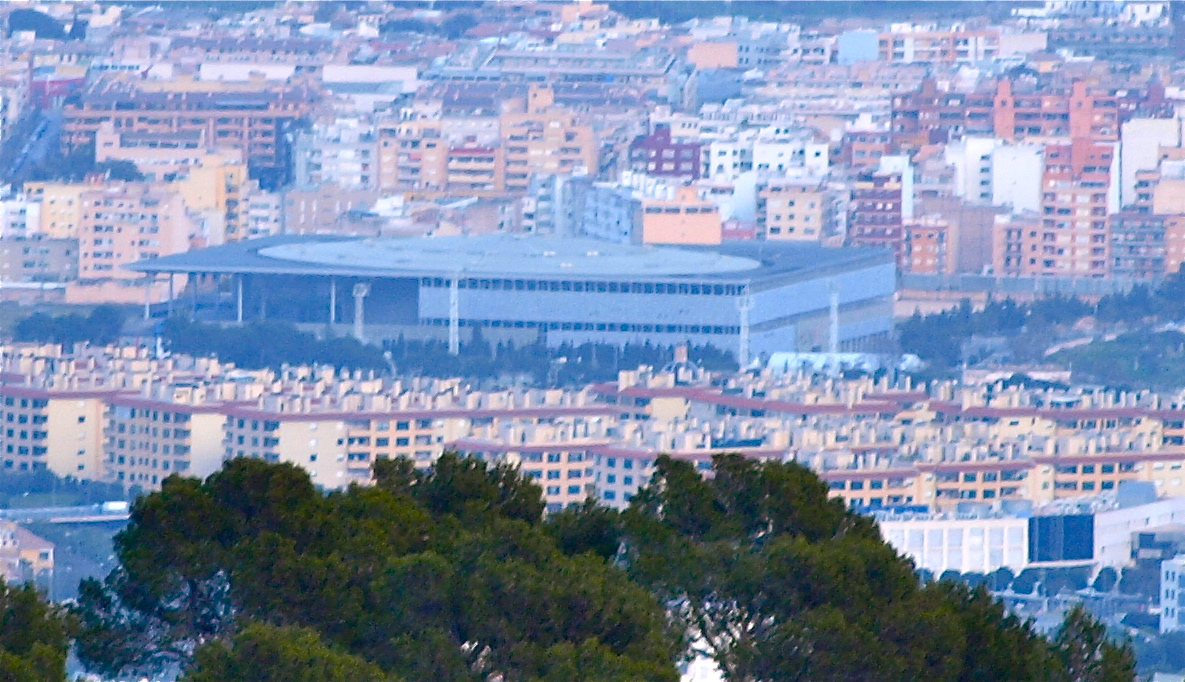
- Interactive map of Palma Arena
- Former names: Palma Arena
- Location: Palma, Spain
- Capacity: 8106

Construction
- Opened: 2007
- Architect: Sander Douma

Website
- https://velodromillesbalears.com/en/pelousse

The Balearic Islands Velodrome (called Palma Arena until 2019) is a multisport pavilion of the city of Palma. Its construction involved major cost overruns and massive corruption.

Its main function is hosting indoor track cycling races on a banked track, and it is one of the best equipped in Europe for this purpose. It was constructed under the auspices of Dutch architectural firm Sander Douma which specializes in indoor cycling venues and was inaugurated in 2007 when it hosted the 2007 UCI Track Cycling World Championships. It has a capacity of 8106 spectators.

On May 2, 2007, it staged the 'Battle of Surfaces' tennis match which saw Mallorca local and World No. 2 Rafael Nadal take on World No. 1 Roger Federer. This match was unique because one side of the court was clay - Nadal's speciality - and the other side was grass - Federer's speciality. The result was a push for Federer as he won equal points on both surfaces, but Nadal used the clay to his advantage in victory capturing 12 more points than he did on grass.

== See also ==
- List of cycling tracks and velodromes
- List of tennis stadiums by capacity

Preceded by Vélodrome de Bordeaux; Bordeaux	UCI Track Cycling World Championships; Venue; 2007	Succeeded by Manchester Velodrome; Manchester
