= Pablo del Campo =

Argentine advertising executive, entrepreneur and author

- Born: Argentina
- Education: ESP School of Communications and Marketing; Asociación Argentina de Agencias de Publicidad
- Occupations: Advertising executive, Entrepreneur, Author
- Known for: Founder of Del Campo Saatchi & Saatchi Saatchi & Saatchi Worldwide Creative Director (2013-2016) Recipient of numerous Cannes Lions awards

Pablo del Campo is an Argentine advertising executive, entrepreneur, and author. He is the founder of Del Campo Saatchi & Saatchi, an agency within the Saatchi & Saatchi and Publicis Groupe networks. Del Campo has earned recognition as a creative executive, having received accolades for his work in Argentina's advertising industry.

== Schooling and Early Career ==
Del Campo attended the ESP School of Communications and Marketing for his degree in advertising and the Asociación Argentina de Agencias de Publicidad for a Masters in Copywriting. He started his career as a copywriter at Casares Grey Argentina in 1989, then became the Executive Creative Director at Young & Rubicam and Lautrec Saatchi & Saatchi before founding his own agency, Del Campo Saatchi & Saatchi Buenos Aires, in 2000.

== Del Campo Saatchi & Saatchi Career (from January 2000 until April 2016) ==
His firm worked for global clients, amongst which include Procter & Gamble, Coca-Cola, PlayStation, InBev and Mondelēz International, as well as local Argentinean clients such as BGH, Andes Beer, and the Buenos Aires Zoo. The agency was recognized as “International Agency of the Year” by the Advertising Age in 2011. Del Campo Saatchi & Saatchi's Argentina agency performance drove the Saatchi & Saatchi network's decision to launch a second Del Campo Saatchi & Saatchi agency office in Madrid, Spain. In January 2013, Del Campo was appointed as the Saatchi & Saatchi's Worldwide Creative Director, leading the agency's global creativity network in over 140 offices in 76 countries. He held this title until April 2016. From its launch until 2016, Del Campo Saatchi & Saatchi has been ranked in the Gunn Report top 10 consolidated table (1999–2016).

== Notable Work ==
Del Campo's advertising work includes “Teletransporter” for Inbev's Andes beer, “Almost Identical” for Beldent gum (Trident), and “Battle of the Surfaces,” in which tennis stars Roger Federer and Rafael Nadal clashed on a unique half-grass/half-clay court, which was broadcast for a 200 million audience. His other creative work includes adapting and producing concerts, theater plays, and musicals such as “Casi Normales” (Spanish version of the Tony Award-winning Broadway hit Next to Normal) and Criatura Emocional (Eve Ensler's Emotional Creature).

== Cannes Lions ==
Del Campo received his first Cannes Lions International Festival of Creativity award in 1996 for Sony's Feel the music campaign and has since won more than 90 awards/lions. He has received Gold Lions in every discipline including the Grand Prix for Inbev Andes Beer “Teletransporter”. He also has been selected as a Cannes juror in different categories: Film Lions in 2000, Titanium in 2010, and president of the jury of Press Lions in 2015.

Del Campo's tenure as Saatchi & Saatchi's Worldwide Creative Director also saw the creation of the 25th edition of the Saatchi & Saatchi New Director's Showcase at the 2015 Cannes Lions International Festival of Creativity which went on to be screened at both the Museum of Modern Art (MoMA) in New York and the Tate Gallery in London.
