= Clear Blue Tuesday =

- Directed by: Elizabeth Lucas
- Written by: Becca Ayers; Julie Danao; Vedant Gokhale; Robi Hager; Erin Hill; Cassandra Kubinski; Brother Love; Elizabeth Lucas; Greg Naughton; Jan O'Dell; Jeremy Schonfeld; Asa Somers
- Produced by: Al Parinello; Joel & Phyllis Ehrlich; Elizabeth Lucas; Trish Whitehurst; Daniel Wallace; Alexander Hammer; Julie Miller
- Starring: Becca Ayers; Julie Danao; Vedant Gokhale; Robi Hager; Erin Hill; Cassandra Kubinski
- Cinematography: Raoul Germain
- Edited by: Alexander Hammer
- Music by: Quentin Chiappetta
- Production company: Clear Blue Productions
- Distributed by: Clear Blue Productions
- Release date: September 10, 2009 (NYMF)
- Running time: 103 minutes
- Country: United States
- Language: English

Clear Blue Tuesday is a 2009 musical film directed by Elizabeth Lucas. It premiered at the Quad Cinema in New York City on September 3, 2010.

== Plot ==
Over the course of seven years, eleven New Yorkers affected by the events of September 11, 2001 are forced to confront themselves and the dreams that brought them to the city.

== Production ==
=== Casting ===
In February 2007, Elizabeth Lucas set out to cast the film. Casting director Michael Cassara brought in over 120 actor/singer-songwriters to audition for roles. Actors were for both on-screen roles and to write their own musical numbers. Much of the cast came from a theatrical background. Several high-profile locations, including 7 World Trade Center and Rockefeller Center were donated for use in the film free of charge.

=== Shooting ===
Clear Blue Tuesday was shot in just 19 days on location in New York City. Prior to production, the cast recorded a scratch-track of most of the film's story-telling soundtrack, although two songs were recorded for the first time live on the set: Becca Ayers' "Brand New Sky" and Jan O'Dell's "The Day The Sky Fell".

== Cast ==
- Becca Ayers as Rose Burns
- Julie Danao as Reena Santiago Isaacs
- Vedant Gokhale as Jain Mahajan
- Robi Hager as Ricardo Santiago
- Erin Hill as Etta Cummins
- Cassandra Kubinski as Samantha Putnam
- Brother Love as Syd Black
- Greg Naughton as Jack King
- Jan O'Dell as Caroline King
- Jeremy Schonfeld as Daniel Isaacs
- Asa Somers as Kyle Cassimer

== Critical reception ==
Slant Magazine gave the film a rating of 1 star out of 4.
