= Louis Hobson =

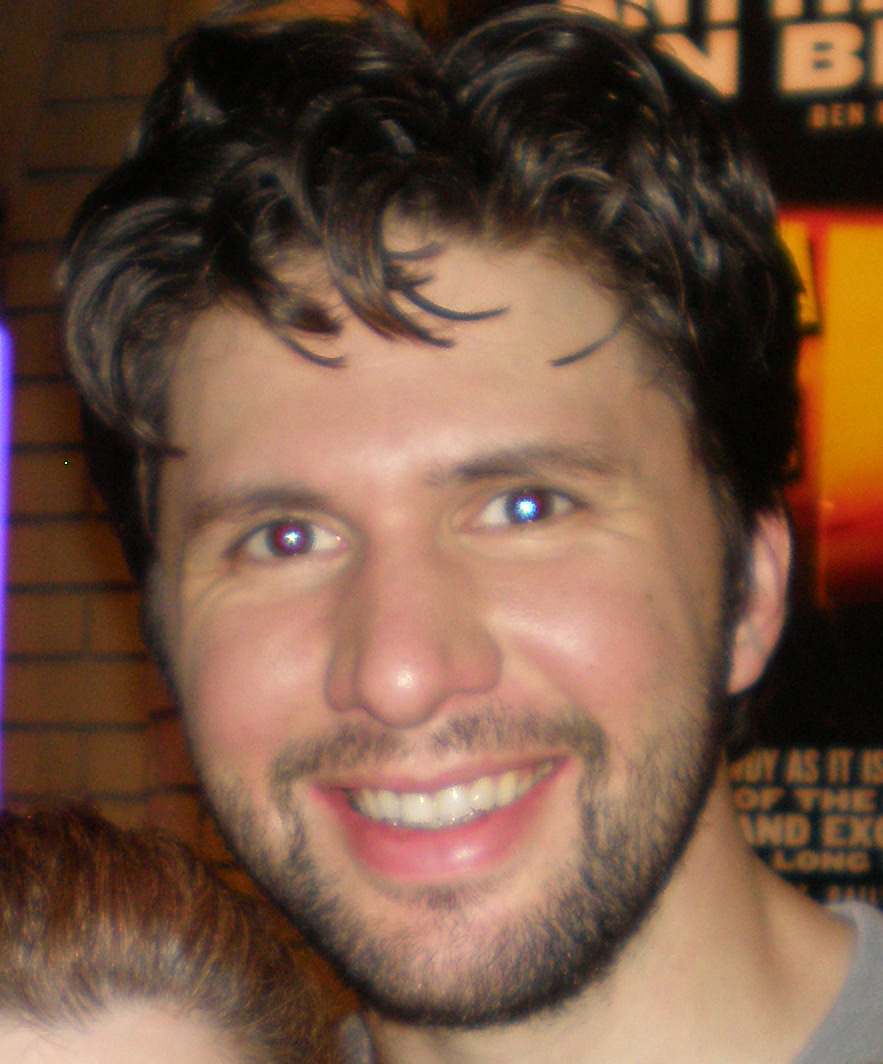
- Hobson in 2010
- Education: Pacific Lutheran University
- Occupations: Actor, artistic director
- Employer: Indie Theatricals

Louis Hobson is an American musical theater actor and was the artistic director of Balagan Theatre in Seattle, Washington. His Broadway credits include Next to Normal and Bonnie & Clyde.

== Education and personal life ==
Hobson grew up in Puyallup, Washington, and attended Pacific Lutheran University, where he majored in theater after switching from music education. He is married and has children.

== Career ==
Hobson spent the first part of his career in Seattle's theater scene, acting at the Village Theatre, 5th Avenue Theatre and others. He played leading roles in productions of West Side Story, Miss Saigon, Evita, and Hair. In 2002, he portrayed Dan in a Seattle reading of Next to Normal.

In the fall of 2008, Hobson moved to New York City "to work with great actors and great directors" and was cast as the two doctors in the Broadway production of Next to Normal, roles he played for the duration of the show's 22-month run. After Next to Normal closed in 2011, Hobson appeared in supporting roles in three short-lived Broadway musicals: The People in the Picture (2011), Bonnie & Clyde (2011), and Leap of Faith (2012). He then worked briefly on producing musicals and readings in New York City.

In 2013, Hobson returned to Seattle to become artistic director of Balagan Theatre. He starred as Jean Valjean in Balagan's 2013 production of Les Misérables and directed Tony Award winner and former Next to Normal co-star Alice Ripley in an October 2013 production of Carrie. Hobson left Balagan Theatre to co-found a for-profit theatrical producing group with former Balagan executive director Jake Groshong. Balagan subsequently closed due to revenue issues.

In March, 2023, Hobson appeared in Into the Woods at the 5th Avenue Theatre, in Seattle, Washington.

== Filmography ==
- Lucky Them (2013)
- Laggies (2014)
- Outside In (2018)
