= Curt Hansen (actor) =

American actor and singer (born 1987)

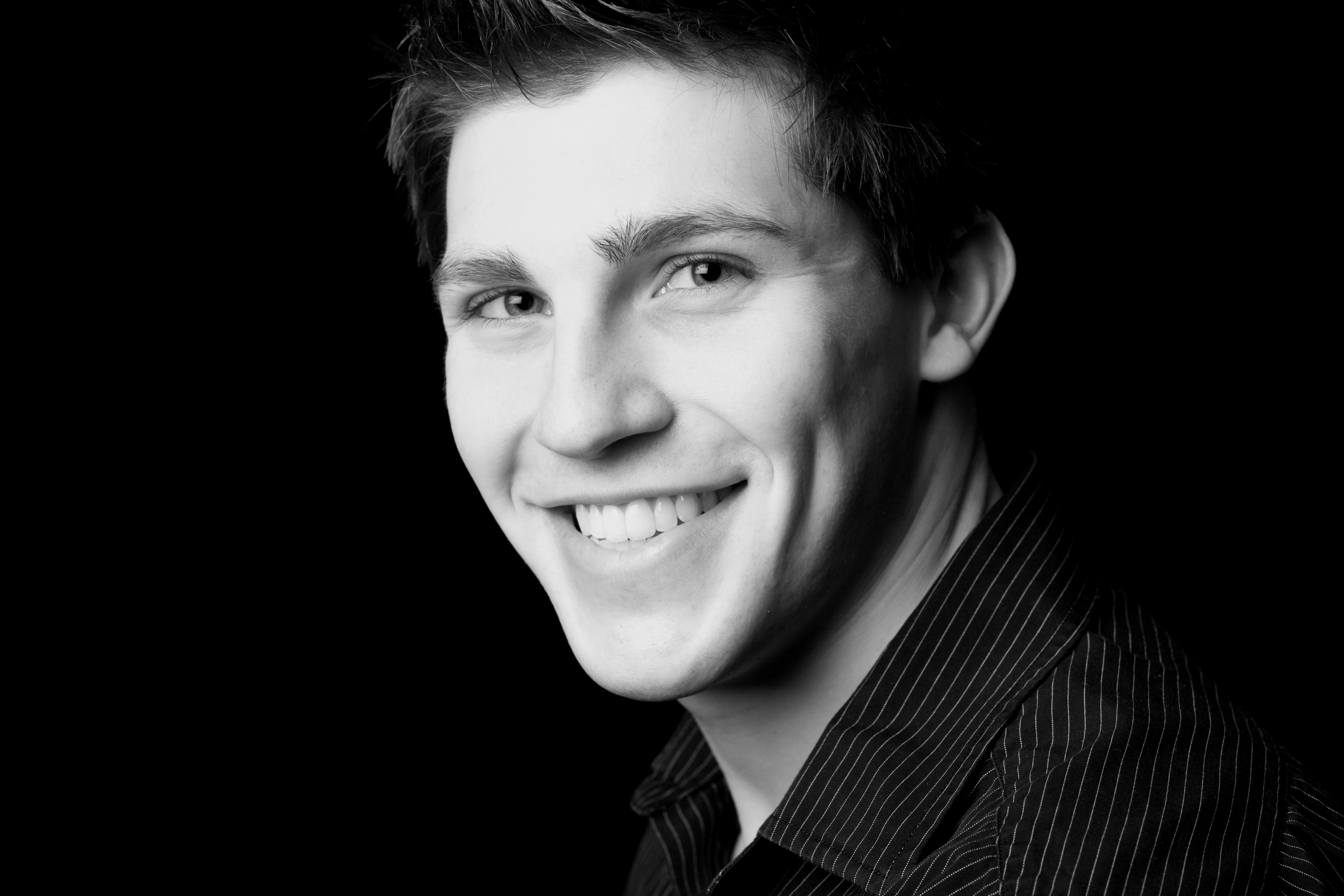

Background information
- Born: August 14, 1987 (age 38); Hartford, Wisconsin, United States
- Genres: Pop, musical theatre
- Occupations: Actor, dancer, singer-songwriter
- Instrument: Vocals
- Years active: 2008–present
- Label: Columbia records (2007–2009)

Curt Hansen (born August 14, 1987) is an American actor and singer.

== Early life ==
He was born in 1987 in Hartford, Wisconsin and is a native actor, singer and dancer. Hansen graduated from Hartford Union High School in Hartford, Wisconsin in 2005.

== Career ==
He starred in the National Tour of Kinky Boots in the role of Charlie. He also performed in the first national tour of Wicked in the role of Fiyero. In 2010, Hansen was the Gabe understudy/cover in the Tony award-winning Broadway musical Next to Normal and continued in the role of Gabe in the First National Tour of the show through 2010–2011. December 2012 he starred in the Pasadena Playhouse's A Snow White Christmas with Neil Patrick Harris and Ariana Grande. February 2013 found Hansen in Louisville starring as Mike in Todd Almond's musical Girlfriend. Curt was a member of the final cast of Hairspray on Broadway, as well as other Broadway readings and workshops. He also performed in the Mark Taper Forum production of Jason Robert Brown's acclaimed musical Parade. He studied with the BFA Musical Theatre program at the University of Wisconsin–Stevens Point. Hansen took over the role of Fiyero from Ashley Parker Angel in the Broadway production of Wicked, beginning on July 16, 2018. He departed the show on September 9, 2018, and was succeeded by Ryan McCartan. He later reprised his role as Fiyero in the musical's second national tour beginning in 2019.

== Filmography ==
Year	Title	Role	Notes
2008	Fashion News Live	Himself	1 episode
2010	Big Time Rush	Dak Zevon	Episodes: "Big Time Photo Shoot" and "Big Time Concert"
2010	The Good Wife	Andre	Episode: "Bad Girls"
2013	B-side	Kate's Boyfriend	
2013	Monkeywrench	Josh	Short
2016	People You May Know	Nicholas	
2018	Madam Secretary	Thomas	Episode: "Night Watch"

== Stage ==
Year	Title	Role	Notes
2008	Hairspray	Ensemble, Link Larkin Understudy	Broadway
2010	Next to Normal	Gabe Understudy	Broadway
2010-2011	Next to Normal	Gabe	National Tour
2013-2014	Wicked	Fiyero Tigelaar	1st National Tour
2015-2016	Wicked	Ensemble, Fiyero Tigelaar Understudy, The Wizard Understudy, and Dr. Dillamond Understudy	Broadway
2017	Kinky Boots	Charlie Price	National Tour
2018	Wicked	Fiyero Tigelaar	Broadway (Gershwin Theatre)
2019–2021	Wicked	Fiyero Tigelaar	2nd National Tour
