= Jeremy Kushnier =

Actor and pop singer

- Born: September 30, 1975 (age 51); Winnipeg, Manitoba, Canada
- Occupations: Actor, singer, songwriter
- Spouse: Jenny Lee Stern
- Children: 2
- Relatives: Serge Kushnier (brother); Bryce Kushnier (brother)
- Website: jeremykushnier.com

Jeremy Kushnier (/ˈkʊʃniər/; born September 30, 1975) is a Canadian actor, singer and songwriter.

== Early life ==
Jeremy Kushnier was born in Winnipeg, Manitoba, Canada. Kushnier attended Miles MacDonell Collegiate, the Winnipeg School of Performing Arts, and the Royal Winnipeg Ballet, all in Winnipeg. He is the brother of the actor Serge Kushnier and the musician Bryce Kushnier, involved with the electronic project Vitaminsforyou.

Kushnier travelled by bus from Toronto to New York City to audition for a role in Footloose in 1997.

== Life and career ==
Kushnier is known for originating the role of Ren McCormick in the musical rendition of Footloose, and for his role in the Tony Award-winning musical Jersey Boys in the role of Tommy Devito and was one of the "Top 10 Great Chicago Performances of 2007". He starred in the Chicago cast, and then opened the Vegas production. He took over the role of Tommy on August 21, 2008 as part of the Toronto engagement of Jersey Boys, which was part of the North American tour. He played Dr. Madden/Dr. Fine in the first national tour of the Pulitzer Prize winning musical Next to Normal.

In the Broadway revival of Jesus Christ Superstar, he played a priest and understudied the roles of Judas, Jesus and Pilate.

He also performed on Broadway in the Cirque du Soleil show Paramour. Kushnier replaced actor Bradley Dean in 2016 in Paramour because of creative differences. He also originated the role of Bausilius in Head Over Heels in 2018.

In February 2025, he joined the cast of the Off-Broadway revival of Little Shop of Horrors as Orin Scrivello.

He was married to Jenny Lee Stern, but they have since divorced. He has two daughters.

== Stage credits ==
Ref:

=== Broadway ===
- Footloose as Ren McCormack (October 22, 1997 – July 2, 2000)
- Rent as Roger Davis (November 17, 2003 – January 17, 2005)
- Jesus Christ Superstar as Ensemble and understudy Jesus/Judas/Pilate (March 1 - July 1, 2012)
- Jersey Boys as Tommy Devito (October 9, 2012 - February 10, 2013)
- Paramour as AJ (April 16, 2016 - April 16, 2017)
- Head Over Heels as Basilius (June 23, 2018 – January 6, 2019)
- Flying Over Sunset as understudy Aldous Huxley (November 11, 2021 - January 16, 2022)
- Galileo as Bishop Maffeo Barberini (November 10, 2026–)

=== Other theatre credits ===
- Oliver Twist in Oliver! at Rainbow Stage, Winnipeg Manitoba (1988)
- Ensemble in The Who's Tommy in the Toronto production and Canada tour (1995)
- Roger Davis in Rent in the US Tour (2001)
- Radames in Disney's Aida in the United States national tour (2002-2003)
- Judas in Jesus Christ Superstar at the Kansas City Starlight Theatre (2005)
- Roger in Rent in the World Tour (2006)
- Jerry in The Full Monty at Maine State Music Theater (2006)
- Tommy DeVito in Jersey Boys in the Chicago, San Francisco, Las Vegas, and US Tour productions (2007-2009)
- Freddie Trumper in Chess at the Signature Theatre (2010)
- Dr. Fine/Dr. Madden in Next to Normal in the first US Tour (2010–2011)
- Pilate in Jesus Christ Superstar in the pre-Broadway La Jolla Playhouse production (2011)
- Mordcha in Fiddler on the Roof at the Stratford Festival (2013)
- Captain Walker in The Who's Tommy at the Stratford Festival (2013)
- Riff Raff in The Rocky Horror Show at the Bucks County Playhouse (2013-2014)
- Eddie Lawrence in Shear Madness in the Off-Broadway production (2015-2016)
- Uncle Ernie in The Who's Tommy at the Ridgefield Playhouse (2016)
- Archibald Craven in The Secret Garden at the Hobby Center for the Performing Arts (2017)
- Rev. Shaw Moore in Footloose at The Muny (2019)
- Bishop Maffeo Barberini in Galileo: A Rock Musical at the Berkeley Repertory Theatre (2024)
- Orin Scrivello in Little Shop of Horrors in the Off-Broadway revival (2025)

== Music ==
Jeremy Kushnier's first CD, In Time (2002), is a celebration of relationships, life and love. Growing up, Jeremy's influences ranged from The Beatles to Billy Joel. Loving the singer/song writer genre he quickly developed his own style of writing, ranging from light ballads to edgy rock and roll.

1. Angel light
2. Randi
3. The ride's on me
4. Brooklyn baby
5. Your little tragedy
6. In time
7. Back away
8. Feminenemy
9. Here for you
10. The smile in her eyes

Kushnier's second release, the EP Jeremy Kushnier (2006), was produced by Jonathan Dinklage and features an acoustic blend of rock and pop influenced by analogue recording techniques. The songwriting continues the style established on his debut, drawing on the singer-songwriter tradition while incorporating pop sensibilities. Tracks range from the subdued Allison to the uptempo Lullaby.

1. Why
2. Lullaby
3. Allison
4. The one about Drew
5. Stars

Soundtrack:

- "One Tree Hill" (one episode, 2006)
- Can't Stop This Thing We've Started (2006) TV episode (performer: "Allison")

== Movies credits ==
Actor:

- The Adulterer (2000) .... Aaron
