= Jerzy Kubina =

Polish-born artist (born 1956)

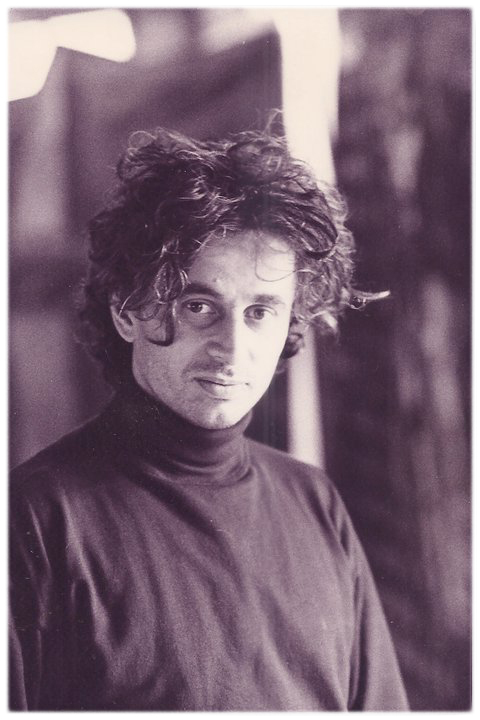
Jerzy Kubina in the mid-90s

Jerzy Kubina (born 1956 in Zamość, Poland) is a painter and installation artist. As a child he studied piano and violin. Instruments would later find their way into his performance work.

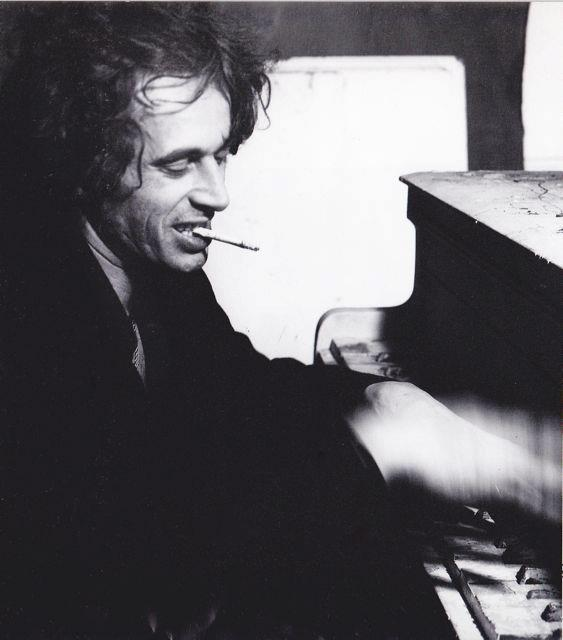
Kubina in performance art piece mid-90s

In 1981, Kubina moved to Kraków where he studied painting at the Academy of Fine Arts in the studio of the renown Polish painter and pedagogue Jan Szancenbach. Kubina graduated from the Academy with distinction in 1985.

Kubina fled Poland in 1987 as a direct consequence of the socio-political turmoil unfolding at the time. Since that time, he has been living and working in New York and exhibiting globally. He is regarded as "one of the most interesting contemporary artists of the circle of Polish visual artists who left for the United States in the 20th century and settled in New York City." Elsewhere, his work is described as often being "laid out as [...] paintings, against the wall, in the form of nervously creased, torn canvas which are then patched back together before being augmented with pigment which is so thick it forms a topographic and symbolic centre."

== Artistic career ==
While his artistic practice is firmly rooted in painting, Kubina is also known for his formal experimentation as well his large-scale installations and performance art work.

Shortly after his arrival in the United States, he spent four years developing his monumental works in a former hotel "Hotel Hamilton" at the invitation of art collector and connoisseur Henryk Lachman. Around the same time, he began a collaboration with the Prisunic Gallery in the meatpacking district of Greenwich Village run by Parisian brothers Paul and Benjamin Steinitz of La Maison Steinitz.

Kubina's work became recognized internationally in the early 1990s, when he exhibited work at the Everson Museum of Art in Syracuse and the Zachęta National Gallery of Art in Warsaw—among others.

Perhaps his best known and most influential exhibition, Ikonostas, was presented at the Galerie Louis XIV in Paris in 1993 and written about by Romanian-born, Paris-based art curator Ami Barak. The exhibition featured large scale installations alongside "heavily-textured abstract paintings [that] resemble wounds and suffering."

In a piece published in Artforum, art historian and critic Marek Bartelik describes this monumental exhibition in the following way:

"Kubina's [...] works, usually monumental, three-dimensional paintings—often diptychs or triptychs—on unprimed canvas and tar paper visibly stapled to wooden stretchers, were all entitled Ikonostas and consecutively numbered. In keeping with their titles—an iconostasis is a partition with doors that divides the sanctuary in an Eastern Orthodox Church from the rest of the church upon which icons are displayed—the works of Kubina are meant to be icon and partition at the same time.

Despite their titles, Kubina's works are stripped of the iconography traditionally associated with religious art. His heavily textured abstract images, painted in thick yellow, brown, and black hues and covered with sand, graphite, and dust, look like inflected, oozing wounds, like calloused skin bearing the signs and scars of suffering. They communicate corrosion, decay, and discord; but, like holy icons, also attempt to address something essential. In order to intensify the experience of pain depicted in his works, the artist placed a wooden structure inside several of them that pushed the canvas and stretched it to its limits, as if they too were in danger of being torn apart by a destructive inner force."

Kubina's work was later also exhibited at the OK Harris Gallery in SoHo, New York in 1997 and at the Chelsea Art Museum in 2003. In 2006, he took part in an international collective exhibition "Poza" in Real Art Ways, "a longstanding alternative art space [...] founded in 1975," which was featured in the New York Times.

Starting in the early 2000s, Kubina began experimenting with silk and translucent materials. Referring to the paintings created in this period, Mary Shustack writes: "Kubina uses a variety of techniques to create layers, textures and translucency in his work. His studio process is similar to that of a laboratory [...]." Transparencies and translucencies are also the primary materials featured in Kubina's exhibition "Zamość, Zamość"—an homage to his hometown, of which the artist writes: "Zamość is—for me—something more than a place. It is a reality, which no longer exists, but which I carry inside me like a talisman."
