= Development girl =

Pejorative term for entry-level film producers

A development girl or D-girl is a derogatory Hollywood slang term for non-influential, entry-level staff members in a film production company. Responsibilities include finding and identifying story ideas worthy of adaptation into a script and writing script coverage for scripts submitted to the production company. The job title is gender neutral – according to Los Angeles Times, approximately a quarter of D-girls are men.

== Cultural References ==
- In D-Girl (The Sopranos), Christopher uses it as an insult after having his movie rejected.
- In The War (The Studio), it is used to insult a more junior member of the creative team.
