= D-Girl (The Sopranos) =

- The Sopranos episode
- Episode no.: Season 2 Episode 7
- Directed by: Allen Coulter
- Written by: Todd A. Kessler
- Cinematography by: Phil Abraham
- Production code: 207
- Original air date: February 27, 2000
- Running time: 56 minutes

Episode chronology
← Previous "The Happy Wanderer"	Next → "Full Leather Jacket"
- The Sopranos season 2

"D-Girl" is the 20th episode of the HBO original series The Sopranos and the seventh of the show's second season. It was written by Todd A. Kessler and directed by Allen Coulter, and originally aired on February 27, 2000.

== Starring ==
- James Gandolfini as Tony Soprano
- Lorraine Bracco as Dr. Jennifer Melfi
- Edie Falco as Carmela Soprano
- Michael Imperioli as Christopher Moltisanti
- Dominic Chianese as Corrado Soprano, Jr.*
- Vincent Pastore as Pussy Bonpensiero
- Steven Van Zandt as Silvio Dante*
- Tony Sirico as Paulie Gualtieri*
- Robert Iler as Anthony Soprano, Jr.
- Jamie-Lynn Sigler as Meadow Soprano
- Drea de Matteo as Adriana La Cerva
- David Proval as Richie Aprile
- Aida Turturro as Janice Soprano
- Nancy Marchand as Livia Soprano

* = credit only

=== Guest starring ===
- Jon Favreau as himself
- Sandra Bernhard as herself
- Janeane Garofalo as herself
- Alicia Witt as Amy Safir
- Louis Lombardi, Jr. as Skip Lipari
- Toni Kalem as Angie Bonpensiero
- Arthur Barnes as Security Guard
- Stephen Bienskie as Hotel Clerk
- John Devlin as Assistant Director
- Dominic Fumusa as Gregory Moltisanti
- Andersen Gabrych as UTA Receptionist
- Bryan Matzkow as Hotel Manager
- Andrea Maulella as Michele Forman
- Jason Minter as Bellman
- Frank Pando as Agent Grasso
- Steve Porcelli as Matt Bonpensiero
- Elizabeth Reaser as Stace
- Asa Somers as Blaine Richardson

== Synopsis ==
Christopher and Adriana meet his cousin Greg and Greg's fiancée Amy. Amy, who is working with Jon Favreau on a film project in New York City, has been eager to meet Christopher and read his screenplay, saying that mob films are popular. She quickly becomes attracted to him. Adriana has kept a copy of the screenplay Christopher threw away and persuades him to pass it to Jon and Amy. They are both invited to the film set, but Christopher goes alone. He is absorbed by what he sees and makes a dialogue suggestion that Jon adopts.

Jon wants to learn about mob customs and speech from Christopher, who gleefully tells him a horrific story of a transgender woman being disfigured in an acid attack by a mobster. Christopher comes as arranged to meet him at his hotel room but he is not available, so Christopher calls on Amy instead. They talk, she begins to give advice about screenwriting, and they end up having sex. A few days later he sees her at the hotel and they go to her room to have sex again, but afterward, she is overcome by guilt.

Christopher finds a screenplay by Jon and sees that he has stolen the acid attack anecdote that Christopher told him in confidence. Enraged, Christopher searches for him, but learns he has returned to California. In the following days, Amy does not reply to his messages. When he finally tracks her down she tells him that Hollywood has lost interest in mob films, and that "it was wrong with us." In a heated argument, he calls her a "D-Girl". She angrily replies that she is a vice president and walks away.

A.J. takes his mother's car without permission and damages it. When his parents rebuke him, he baffles them by stating that life is absurd and he does not wish to be confirmed because "God is dead." Tony consults Pussy, who is A.J.'s godfather and confirmation sponsor; Pussy says that at that age "they get broody." Tony consults Dr. Melfi, who explains that A.J. has discovered existentialism. A.J. consults his grandmother Livia, who tells him not to expect happiness and that everyone dies alone; "It's all a big nothing."

Pussy is forced by the FBI to wear a wire at A.J.'s confirmation and the ensuing reception at the Soprano residence. During the reception, Tony discovers A.J. and two friends smoking marijuana in the garage. Pussy goes up to A.J.'s room, where he is sulking, and gently tells him that his father is a good man; A.J. is young and should enjoy life. He hugs him and sends him back down to the party, but Pussy himself goes into the bathroom and sobs.

Adriana has inadvertently told Tony about Christopher's screenwriting. Christopher misses the confirmation ceremony and arrives late for the reception. Tony then tells him he has a choice: either follow his other interests (and never see Tony again) or give up his interests and completely commit himself to the family. Christopher goes out and thinks it over, then goes back inside to the Soprano family.

== Title reference ==
The episode's title is a shortened title for "development girl", used mostly in the film and television industry; Chris calls Amy one.

== Cultural references ==
- Christopher refers to the 1971 comedy film The Gang That Couldn't Shoot Straight when Favreau talks about his passion to make and star in another film about "Crazy Joe Gallo".
- Amy notes the 1999 romantic comedy Mickey Blue Eyes (which shares multiple actors with The Sopranos) when telling Christopher that Hollywood has lost interest in mob movies for the moment.
- Adriana tells Amy and John that she enjoyed Favreau's 1996 film Swingers, with Vince Vaughn. Chris later compares it to Saving Private Ryan.
- When Carmela and Tony express concern about AJ's existentialist pronouncements, Meadow quotes Madame de Staël: "One must choose in life between boredom and suffering.”
- Meadow says that A.J. has been assigned The Stranger, a novel by Albert Camus.
- A.J. says "God is dead", explicitly citing philosopher Friedrich Nietzsche (pronouncing it "Nitch"), in The Gay Science.
- When Christopher relates the story of the woman whose lover mutilated her with acid after learning that she was transgender, Amy recalls the 1992 film The Crying Game.
- Amy relates Maslow's hierarchy of needs to Christopher before becoming intimate with him.
- When Amy tells Christopher they were wrong to have begun a relationship and Christopher responds that he really liked her, Amy observes that the mood has become rather "William Inge".
- Upon seeing Sandra Bernhard on set Christopher notes her appearance in the 1982 film The King of Comedy which Chris misnames as "Kings of Comedy".
- Amy relates news of film producers Harvey and Bob Weinstein remaking Viva Zapata! with director Robert Rodriguez.

== Music ==
- When Chris, John, and Amy sit down at the pizza shop, the song played is "Swingtown" by the Steve Miller Band. It is then followed by "Rhiannon" by Fleetwood Mac.
- The song played over the end credits is "Vedi, Maria", by Emma Shapplin from her debut album Carmine Meo.
- Other music included in this episode includes: "Sonho de Magia" by João Pernambuco, "Tasty Pudding" by Chet Baker, "Shaolin Satellite" by Thievery Corporation, "Voulez-Vous?" by Arling & Cameron, and "Caught My Mind" by Pushmonkey.

== Filming locations ==
Listed in order of first appearance:

- North Caldwell, New Jersey
- Jersey City, New Jersey
- SoHo, Manhattan
- Newark, New Jersey
- Harrison, New Jersey
- SoHo Grand Hotel in SoHo, Manhattan
- Montclair, New Jersey
- Silvercup Studios in Long Island City, Queens
