= Cassandra Kubinski =

American singer

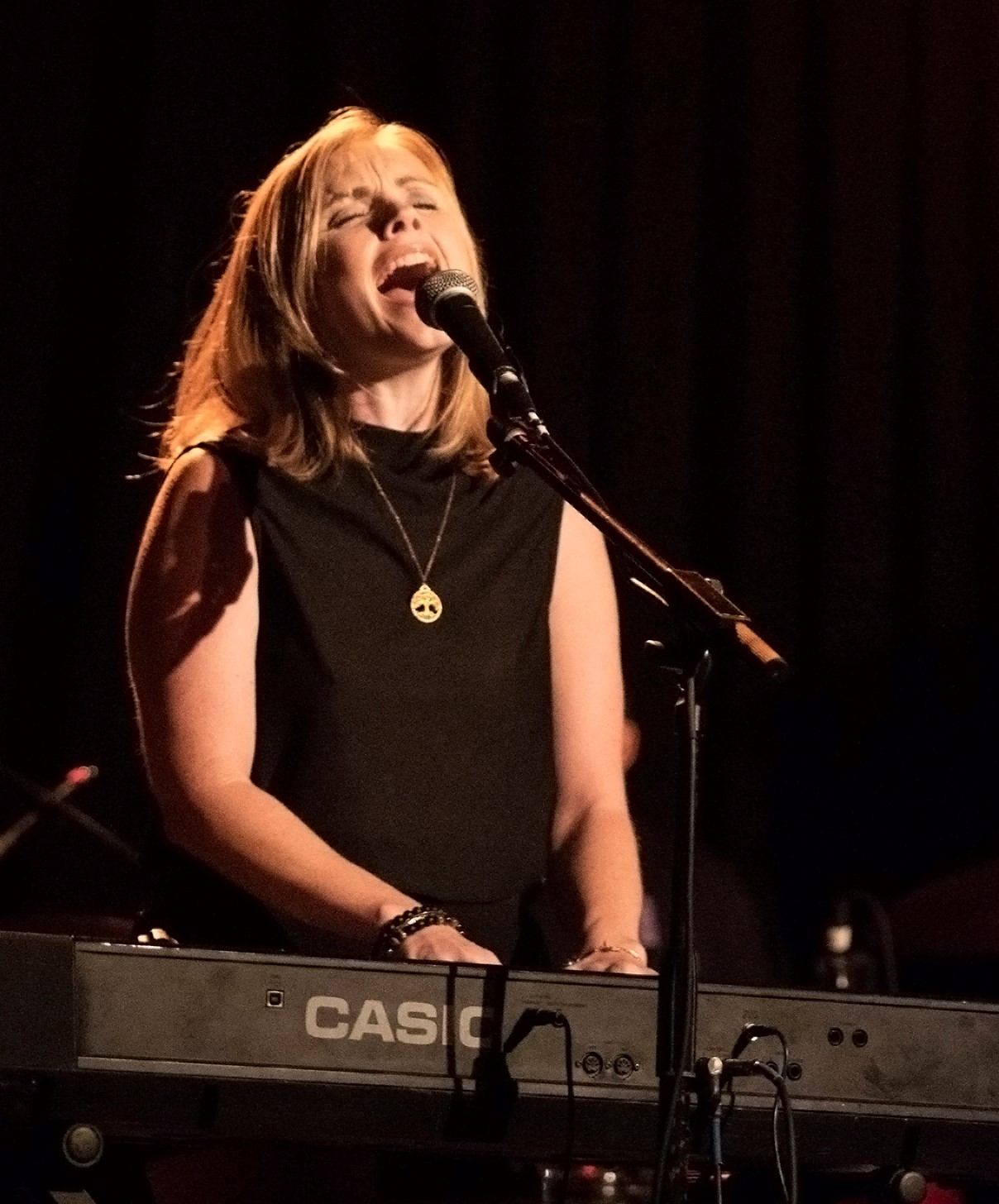
- Kubinski performing in 2018

Background information
- Born: Cassandra Kubinski; Enfield, Connecticut, U.S.
- Origin: New York City
- Genres: Pop; R&B; Dance-Pop
- Occupations: Singer-songwriter, record producer
- Years active: 1990–present
- Label: Independent
- Website: CassandraKubinski.com

Cassandra Kubinski is an American pop artist, songwriter, and actress. She is known for her piano-driven blend of soulful, theatrically tinged music evocative of singer-songwriters like Billy Joel, Carole King, Sara Bareilles and Ingrid Michaelson. Kubinski has collaborated on song releases or performances with the Goo Goo Dolls, 10,000 Maniacs, Chris Botti, Jill Sobule, Caroline Jones, Anna Nalick and more. Her music has also been used in many TV shows, most notably 9 song placements on Lifetime's hit show Dance Moms.

== Early life and education ==
Cassandra Kubinski grew up in Enfield CT, and then graduated from Florida State University with a BA in Theatre. She began her professional career as the lead role in the musical "Annie", at Goodspeed Opera House in East Haddam, Connecticut. Cassandra won the Straw Hat Award for Best Musical Actress in the show "Mirette", also at Goodspeed.

== Career ==
In 2005, Kubinski launched her debut album Hiding Underneath (2005) setting her transition from Broadway/Musical Theater to pop singer songwriter. Kubinski's second album, Hold the Sun (2007), established her on the singer/songwriter scene in NYC, Germany, Jamaica and elsewhere, as she toured the US (Borders Books and Music national “Artist to Watch” 2008). Kubinski opened for the likes of Anna Nalick, Dickie Betts, and Ingram Hill. Her music also started receiving radio airplay and placement on TV channels such as MTV, Lifetime, Food Network, Bravo as well as in films such as Dare, Red Hook, and Life’s Passing Me By. Subsequently, Kubinski and Billy Joel collaborated on the lyrics for the song "No Hard Feelings", as reference in Joel's biography written by Fred Schruers.

In 2009, the movie Clear Blue Tuesday, a rock movie/musical following the lives of 11 New York city residents in the 7 years post-9/11, was released. The movie featured Kubinski's work as a singer, songwriter and actress. The following year, Kubinski's work in Nashville was released in a double album feature entitled LIVE at Camp Nashville.

Her 4th album, Just Being Myself (2014), was produced by Edd Kalehoff, the composer/producer behind the music of Monday Night Football, The View, Good Morning America, and artists like Faith Hill, Britney Spears, and Sarah Vaughn. The album was a collaboration with pop/jazz trumpeter Chris Botti, who is featured on the track “Je T’aime”, and in the re-imagined version of Lady Gaga’s “Bad Romance.”

Kubinski has used her songs to benefit numerous philanthropic causes, including autism spectrum disorder. One of her songs, "Not So Different", was re-recorded in collaboration with the Goo Goo Dolls and Mary Ramsey from 10,000 Maniacs, and the release show raised $25,000 for the Institute for Autism Research in upstate NY. "Not So Different" later appeared on Kubinski's EP Onward, which was her Billboard Heatseekers debut.

Holiday Magic, Kubinski's 6th album, also hit the Billboard Heatseekers chart and featured 3 original holiday songs as well as re-imagined covers of "Little Drummer Boy", "Sleigh Ride" (featuring Matt Cusson), and a mashup of "I'll Be Home for Christmas" and "Homeward Bound".

Kubinski was the bandleader and musical director for the first 2 seasons of Emmy-winning new media TV show, The Never Settle Show hosted by Mario Armstrong.

Kubinski's work as a voice-over actress is frequently heard on commercials and promos, for brands such as Snickers (Super Bowl Brady Bunch spot featuring Danny Trejo and Steve Buscemi), Tampax, Hershey's, and Nature Valley.

She serves as Global Co-Chair of Membership for international music industry organization Women in Music.

== Discography ==
=== Albums ===
Title	Album details	Peak chart positions	
Title	Album details	US	Worldwide
Hiding Underneath	Release year: 2005; Formats: CD, digital download	—	—
Hold The Sun	Release year: 2007; Formats: CD, digital download	—	—
LIVE at Camp Nashville	Release year: 2010; Formats: CD, digital download	—	—
Just Being Myself	Release year: 2014; Formats: CD, digital download	—	—
Onward	Release year: 2016; Formats: CD, digital download	#97 on Billboard Heatseekers chart	—
Holiday Magic	Release year: 2017; Formats: CD, digital download	#46 on Billboard Heatseekers chart in November 2017	—
Dreams	Release year: 2019; Formats: CD, digital download	—	—

=== Singles ===
Year	Single	Peak chart positions		Album
Year	Single	US	Worldwide	Album
2012	Save You Tonight	—	—	Hiding Underneath
2012	Twisted	—	—	Hold the Sun
2012	Somebody Told Me	—	—	Hold the Sun
2012	Halfway To Heaven	—	—	Hold the Sun
2012	On My Way Home	—	—	Hold the Sun
2013	Not So Different	—	—	Onward
2013	Swim: Open Waters	—	—	—
2015	Believe	—	—	—
2015	Oceans Away	—	—	—
2015	Deeper	—	—	—
2015	Barcode	—	—	—
2016	New Year Comin'	—	—	Holiday Magic
2016	Not So Different (Ladies First featuring John Rzeznik)	—	—	—
2018	Calling All Angels We Have Heard On High	—	—	—
2019	You Get Me	—	—	Dreams
2019	Dreams	—	—	Dreams
2020	Back to the Earth	—	—	—
2020	Stardust	—	—	—
2020	Stardust (DJ Taz Rashid Remix)	—	—	—

== Awards ==
2016 Women in Sync Award - Best Original Music in a TV Show
