= Alice Ripley =

American actress

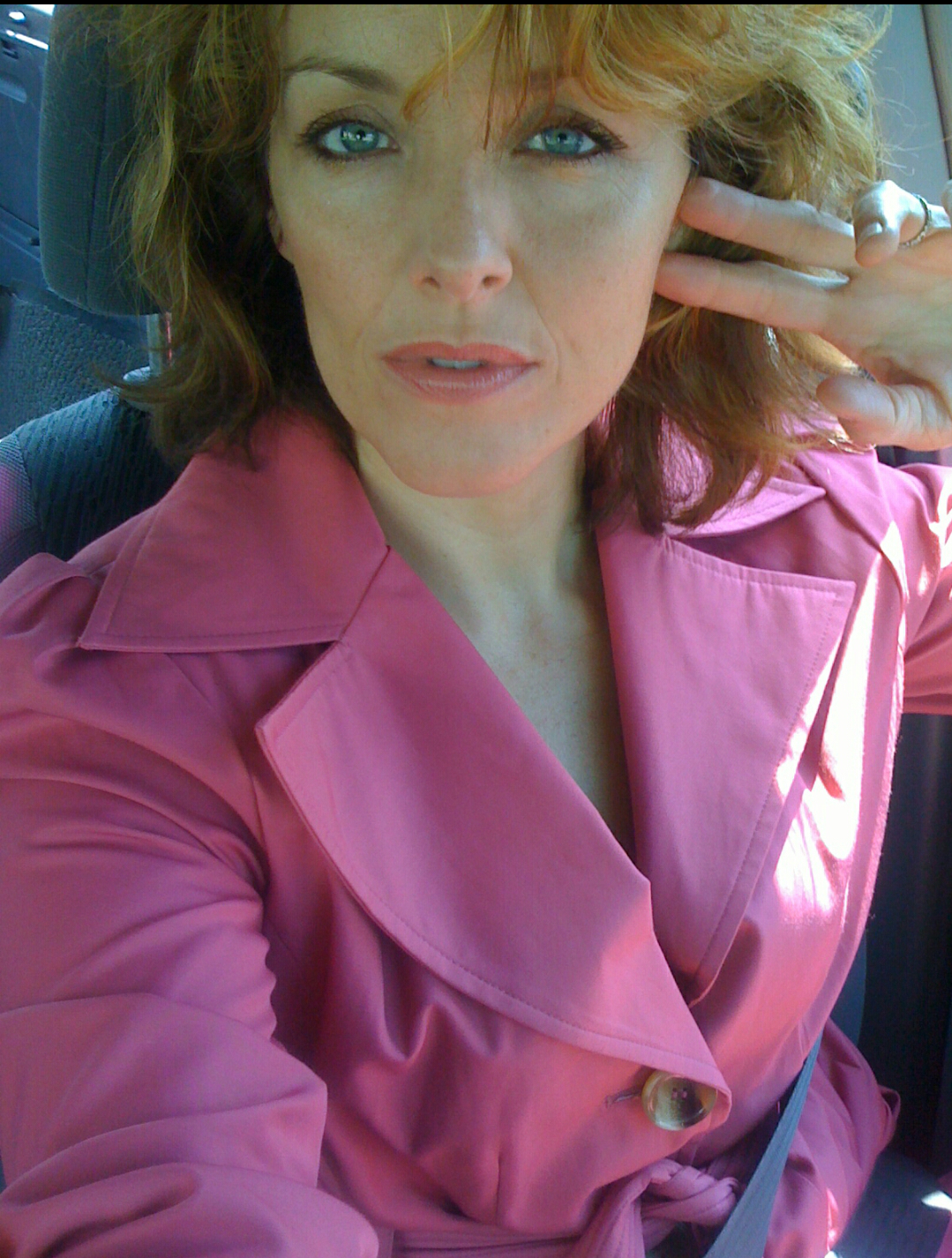
- Ripley in 2009
- Born: 1963 or 1964 (age 62–63); California, U.S.
- Education: Kent State University (BFA)
- Occupations: Actor; singer-songwriter; mixed media artist
- Awards: 2009 Tony Award for Best Actress in a Musical; 2009 Helen Hayes Award for Best Actress in a Musical; Best Actress in a Feature Film for SUGAR! at the Glendale International Film Festival, 2016

Alice Ripley (born 1963 or 1964) is an American actress, singer, songwriter, and mixed media artist. She is best known for her work in Broadway musicals, including originating the role of Diana Goodman in the Pulitzer Prize-winning Next to Normal, for which she won the 2009 Tony Award for Best Actress in a Musical. Other notable Broadway credits include Violet Hilton in Side Show, Betty Schaefer in Sunset Boulevard, and Janet Weiss in The Rocky Horror Show.

She most recently played three roles in the short-lived Broadway musical, American Psycho. Alice Ripley has released albums with her band, RIPLEY, including the single, "Beautiful Eyes", released in February 2012. She also performs as a solo artist, while in February 2011 she released Alice Ripley Daily Practice, Volume 1, a stripped-down collection of acoustic rock covers.

== Early life ==
Ripley was born in California and graduated from West Carrollton High School outside of Dayton, Ohio.

== Career ==
=== Early work ===
Ripley attended DePauw University, where she majored in Vocal Performance, before transferring to Kent State University where she received a BFA in Musical Theatre in 1985 and was a member of the Delta Gamma sorority. While at University, Ripley performed in a number of stage productions, while her first paid acting job was at the Red Barn Summer Theatre in Frankfort, Indiana. Following college, she was active in community theatre in San Diego, California, and subsequently received her Actor's Equity card at the La Jolla Playhouse through a production of Silent Edward, a musical written by Des McAnuff, who was Artistic Director of the La Jolla Playhouse at the time and who would later direct Ripley in her Broadway debut in The Who's Tommy.

=== Broadway ===
In her 1993 debut, Ripley played a Local Lass and the Specialist's Assistant in the original cast of The Who's Tommy; she also understudied the role of Mrs. Walker. Broadway roles that followed were Betty Schaefer in Sunset Boulevard (1994), Bathsheba in King David (1997), Violet Hilton in Side Show (1997), Fantine in Les Misérables (1998), Molly Ivors in James Joyce's The Dead (2000), Janet Weiss in The Rocky Horror Show (2000), one of The Sweethearts in Dreamgirls, the concert (2001), and Diana Goodman in Next to Normal (2009). With the exception of Les Misérables, Ripley was part of the original cast of these productions.

Ripley's performance as conjoined twin Violet Hilton in Side Show earned her and her co-star Emily Skinner critical acclaim, a cult following, and a shared 1998 Tony Award nomination, making them the first to be co-nominated in a musical. She was nominated for a Drama Desk Award for Outstanding Actress in a Musical.

From March 27, 2009 to July 18, 2010 at the Booth Theatre, Ripley starred in the Pulitzer Prize-winning Next to Normal, a performance which earned her the 2009 Tony Award for Best Actress in a Musical.

In 2016, Ripley appeared in the Broadway musical, American Psycho, playing the mother of the main character, Patrick Bateman, as well as the roles of Mrs. Wolfe and Svetlana.

=== Off-Broadway ===
Ripley's 2008 performance in Next to Normal (Second Stage Theatre) earned her Drama Desk and Outer Critics Circle award nominations. Additional Off-Broadway roles include Nelly Bly in Cather County (1993, Playwrights Horizons), Daisy Mae in Li'l Abner (1998, New York City Center), various characters in The Vagina Monologues (2002, Westside Theatre), Olivia in Five Flights (2004, Rattlestick Theater), Marsha in Wild Animals You Should Know (2011, MCC/Lucille Lortel Theater), Mary Todd Lincoln, Lewis Payne, and other roles in A Civil War Christmas (2012, NYTW), and Sook Faulk in A Christmas Memory.

=== Regional theatre ===
Ripley's regional credits include Clybourne Park at the Long Wharf Theatre, New Haven, as Bev/Kathy in May 2013; Next to Normal at Arena Stage (Helen Hayes Award, Best Actress in a Musical, non-resident production), Little Shop of Horrors, Tell Me On A Sunday (Helen Hayes nomination), Company (Helen Hayes nomination), Gentlemen Prefer Blondes, Show Boat, Shakespeare in Hollywood (Helen Hayes nomination), The Baker's Wife, Sweeney Todd, Carousel, Sunset Boulevard (as Norma), Into the Woods, and Carrie.

=== National tours ===
On tour, Ripley played Fantine in Les Misérables (1993–94). She reprised her role as Diana in Next to Normal, the U.S. Tour (November 23, 2010 – July 30, 2011).

=== Film ===
Ripley's films include The Adulterer (2000), Temptation (2004), Isn't It Delicious (2013), Sing Along (2013), The Way I Remember It (2015), Bear With Us (2016), SUGAR! (2016), and Muckland (2015).

=== Television ===
Ripley appeared in an episode of Girlboss, a new Netflix half-hour comedy which premiered in April 2017. She previously guest-starred on Blue Bloods and Royal Pains, and played herself in the series finale of the TV comedy, 30 Rock.

== Controversies ==
In 2010, Ripley used a homophobic slur in a Facebook post. Many within the theater community found it insensitive, while some came to her defense. Ripley soon apologized for her words.

In 2021, allegations became public that Ripley had engaged in inappropriate relationships with underage fans, including engaging in sexual conversations, leading some to describe the behaviour as grooming. Four individuals claimed publicly that Ripley abused her position of power over them. One individual alleged that Ripley kissed her without consent after she turned 18. Ripley has denied the allegations.

== Discography ==
=== Ripleytheband ===
- "Beautiful Eyes" single (2012, self-produced)
- Alice Ripley Daily Practice, Volume 1 (2011, Sh-K-Boom Records)
- Outtasite (2006, Shellac)
- Ripley EP (2003, Shellac)
- Everything's Fine (2001, Ghostlight)

=== Broadway cast recordings ===
- Next to Normal (2009, Sh-K-Boom) (Original)
- Dreamgirls (2002, Nonesuch) (Concert Production)
- The Rocky Horror Show (2000, RCA Victor Broadway) (Revival)
- Side Show (1997, Sony Classical) (Original)
- King David (1997, Walt Disney) (Original)
- The Who's Tommy (1992, RCA Victor Broadway) (Original)

=== Original cast recordings ===
- Bubble Boy (2017, Ghostlight)
- Little Fish (2007, Ghostlight)
