= Dessa (disambiguation) =

Dessa is an American singer, rapper, and writer.

Dessa may also refer to:

- Dessa, Niger, a village and rural commune
- Dessa (artist), Swiss visual artist Deborah Petroz-Abeles (born 1948)
- Dessa (Filipina singer), Filipino singer Maria Destreza Alivio Salazar (born 1974)
- the title character of Dessa Rose, a novel by Sherley Anne Williams
- Dessa Rose (musical), a musical based on the novel
- Dessa, a fictitious planet in the Soviet film Per Aspera Ad Astra
