= Kindred (novel) =

1979 novel by Octavia E. Butler

- First edition cover of Kindred
- Author: Octavia E. Butler
- Cover artist: Kars Vlietstra
- Language: English
- Genre: neo-slave narrative using science fiction framework
- Publisher: Doubleday
- Publication date: June 1979
- Publication place: United States
- Media type: Print (hardback & paperback)
- Pages: 264 pp
- Awards: 2003 Rochester, New York's book of the year
- ISBN: 0-385-15059-8
- OCLC: 4835229
- Dewey Decimal: 813/.5/4
- LC Class: PZ4.B98674 Ki PS3552.U827

Kindred (1979) is a novel by American writer Octavia E. Butler that incorporates time travel and is modeled on slave narratives. Widely popular, it has frequently been chosen as a text by reading programs and book organizations, and also for high school and college courses.

The book is the first-person account of a young African-American writer, Dana, who is repeatedly transported in time from her Los Angeles home in 1976 (alone and once with her white husband) to an early 19th-century Maryland plantation outside Easton. There she meets some of her ancestors, including Alice, a free Black woman, and Rufus, a white planter who forces Alice into slavery and concubinage. As Dana stays for longer periods in the past, she becomes enmeshed in the plantation community. Dana makes hard choices to survive slavery and ensure her return to her own time.

Kindred explores the dynamics and dilemmas of antebellum slavery from the sensibility of a late 20th-century Black woman who is aware of its legacy in contemporary American society. Through the two interracial couples who form the emotional core of the story, the novel also explores the intersection of power, gender, and race issues, and speculates on the prospects of future egalitarianism.

While most of Butler's work is classified as science fiction, Kindred crosses genre boundaries and is also classified as African-American literature. Butler categorized the work as "a kind of grim fantasy."

== Plot ==
Kindred scholars have noted that the novel's chapter headings suggest something "elemental, apocalyptic, archetypal about the events in the narrative", thus giving the impression that the main characters are participating in matters greater than their personal lives.

=== Prologue ===
Dana, a young black woman, wakes up in the hospital with her arm amputated. Police deputies question her about the circumstances and ask her whether her husband Kevin, a white man, beats her. Dana tells them that she lost her arm because of an accident and that Kevin is not to blame. When Kevin visits her, they acknowledge being afraid to tell the truth because no one would believe them.

=== The River ===
Their lives were altered on Dana's twenty-sixth birthday, June 9, 1976, the year that the United States was celebrating its bicentennial. The day before, Dana and Kevin had moved from an apartment in Los Angeles to a house a few miles away. While unpacking, Dana suddenly becomes dizzy, then finds herself at the edge of a wood, near a river where a small, red-haired boy is drowning. Dana wades in, drags him to shore, and tries to revive him. The boy's mother begins screaming and hitting Dana, accusing her of killing her son, whom she identifies as Rufus. As the boy recovers, a white man arrives and points a gun at Dana, terrifying her. She becomes dizzy again and regains consciousness at home with Kevin beside her. Shocked at her disappearance and reappearance, Kevin tries to understand if the episode was real or a hallucination.

=== The Fire ===
Dana washes off the filth from the river but dizziness arrives with another transition. This time, she comes to in a bedroom where a red-haired boy has set the drapes aflame. He is Rufus, now a few years older. Dana quickly puts out the fire. Rufus confesses he set the fire to get back at his father, who beat him after he stole a dollar. As they talk, Rufus casually uses the N-word to refer to Dana, which upsets her, and she comes to realize that she has been transported in time as well as space, specifically to Maryland, circa 1815.

Rufus advises her to seek refuge at the home of Alice Greenwood and her mother, free blacks who live at the edge of the plantation. Dana realizes that both Rufus and Alice are her ancestors, as they will have a child from whom she will descend. At the Greenwoods', Dana witnesses a group of young white men smash down the door, drag out Alice's enslaved father, and whip him for being there without papers. One of the men punches Alice's mother when she refuses his advances. The men leave, Dana comes out of hiding, and helps Alice's mother. One of the white men confronts Dana and attempts to rape her. Fearing for her life, Dana returns to 1976.

Though hours have passed for Dana, Kevin assures her that she has been gone only for a few minutes. The next day, Kevin and Dana prepare for the possibility that she may travel back in time again by packing a survival bag for her and doing some research on Black history in books at their library.

=== The Fall ===
In a flashback, Dana recounts how she met Kevin while doing minimum-wage temporary jobs at an auto-parts warehouse. Kevin becomes interested in Dana when he learns that she is a writer and they become friends, although coworkers are judgmental because he is white. The two find they have much in common; both are orphans who love to write, and both of their families disapproved of their aspiration to become writers. They become lovers.

In 1976, Kevin is preparing to go to the library to find out how to forge "free papers" for Dana. She feels dizzy and Kevin holds her, traveling with her to the past. They find Rufus writhing in pain from a broken leg. Next to him is a black boy named Nigel, whom they send to the main house for help.

Rufus reacts with violent disbelief when he finds out that Kevin and Dana are married: whites and blacks are not allowed to marry in his time, although many white men have enslaved black mistresses. Dana and Kevin explain to Rufus that they are from the future and prove it by showing the dates on the coins Kevin has in his pockets. Rufus promises to keep their identities a secret, and Dana tells Kevin to pretend that he is her owner. When Tom Weylin, Rufus's father, arrives with his slave Luke to retrieve Rufus, Kevin introduces himself. Weylin grudgingly invites him to dinner.

At the Weylin plantation, Rufus's mother, Margaret, fusses about her son's well-being and, jealous of the attention he shows Dana, sends her to the cookhouse where she meets two house slaves: Sarah, the cook; and Carrie, her mute daughter. With Dana and Kevin uncertain about what they should do, Kevin accepts Weylin's offer to become Rufus's tutor. Kevin and Dana stay on the plantation for several weeks. They observe the relentless cruelty and torture that Weylin, his wife, and the spoiled Rufus use against the slaves because they feel entitled to treat the slaves as property. Weylin catches Dana teaching Nigel, a slave boy, how to read and whips her. The dizziness overcomes her before Kevin can reach her, and she travels back to 1976 alone.

=== The Fight ===
In a flashback, Dana remembers how she and Kevin were married. Both of their families opposed the marriage due to ethnic bias. While Kevin's reactionary sister is prejudiced against African Americans, Dana's uncle abhors the idea of a white man eventually inheriting his property. Only Dana's aunt favors the union, as it would mean that her niece's children would have lighter skin. Kevin and Dana marry without any family present.

After eight days at home recuperating without Kevin, Dana time travels to find Rufus getting beaten by Isaac Jackson, Alice's enslaved husband. Dana learns that Rufus had attempted to rape Alice, who was once his childhood friend. Dana convinces Isaac not to kill Rufus, and Alice and Isaac run away while Dana gets Rufus home. She learns that five years have passed since her last visit and Kevin has left Maryland. Dana nurses Rufus back to health in return for his help in delivering letters to Kevin. Five days later, Alice and Isaac are caught.

Isaac is mutilated and sold to traders heading to Mississippi. Alice is beaten, savaged by dogs, and enslaved as penalty for helping Isaac escape. Rufus, who claims to love Alice, buys her, and orders Dana to nurse her back to health. Dana does so with much care. When Alice finally recovers, she curses Dana for not letting her die and is wracked with grief for her lost husband.

Rufus orders Dana to convince Alice to have sex with him. Dana speaks with Alice, outlining her three options: she can refuse and be whipped and raped; she can acquiesce; or she can try again to run away. Injured and terrified by her previous punishment, Alice gives in to Rufus and becomes his concubine. When she learns that Rufus did not send Dana's letters to Kevin, she tells Dana. Furious that Rufus lied to her, Dana runs away to find Kevin, but is betrayed by a jealous slave. Rufus and Weylin capture Dana and Weylin whips her.

When Weylin learns that Rufus failed to keep his promise to Dana to send her letters to Kevin, he writes to Kevin that Dana is on the plantation. Kevin comes to retrieve Dana, but Rufus stops them on the road and threatens to shoot them. He tells Dana that she can't leave him again. The dizziness overcomes Dana and she travels back to 1976, this time with Kevin.

=== The Storm ===
The relief of Dana's and Kevin's reunion is short-lived. Kevin has a hard time adjusting after living in the past for five years. He tells Dana a few details about that life: he witnessed terrible atrocities against slaves, traveled farther up north, worked as a teacher, helped slaves escape, and grew a beard to disguise himself from a lynch mob. Disconcerted by the difficulty he is having in returning to his former life, he grows angry and cold. Deciding to let him work his feelings out, Dana packs a bag in case she time travels again.

She soon finds herself outside the Weylin plantation house in a rainstorm, with a very drunk Rufus lying face down in a puddle. She tries to drag him back to the house, then gets Nigel to help her carry him. At the house, an aged Weylin orders Dana to nurse Rufus back to health. Suspecting that Rufus has malaria and that she cannot help much, to lower his fever Dana feeds him the aspirin she has packed. Rufus survives, but remains weak for weeks. Dana learns that Rufus and Alice have had three mixed-race "children of the plantation" but only one, a boy named Joe, has survived. Rufus had forced Alice to let the doctor bleed the other two when they had fallen ill, a customary treatment of the time, but it killed them. Alice is pregnant again.

When Weylin has a heart attack and Dana is unable to save his life, Rufus believes that she let him die and sends her to work in the corn fields as punishment. By the time he reverses his decision, she has collapsed from exhaustion and is being whipped by the overseer. Rufus assigns Dana to take care of his ailing mother. Now the master of the plantation, Rufus sells off some slaves, including Tess, Weylin's former concubine. When Dana expresses her anger about that sale, Rufus explains that his father left debts he must pay and convinces Dana to use her writing skill to stave off his other creditors.

Alice gives birth to a girl, Hagar, a direct ancestor of Dana. Alice confides that she plans to run away with her children as soon as possible, as she fears that she is forgetting to hate Rufus. Dana convinces Rufus to let her teach his son Joe and some of the slave children how to read. However, when a slave asks Dana if his younger siblings can join the lessons, Rufus sells him off as punishment for flirting with her. When Dana tries to interfere, Rufus hits her. Faced with her powerlessness over Rufus, she retrieves the knife she has brought from home and slits her wrists in an effort to time travel.

=== The Rope ===
Dana awakens at home with her wrists bandaged and Kevin by her side. She tells him of her eight months on the plantation, Hagar's birth, and the need to keep Rufus alive, as the slaves would be separated and sold if he died. When Kevin asks if Rufus has raped her, she says that he has not and that, despite the possible consequences, she would kill him if he tried.

Fifteen days later, on the 4th of July, Dana returns to the plantation. She learns that when Alice tried to run away after Dana disappeared, Rufus whipped her and lied to her, telling her that he had sold her children. Not knowing that he had actually sent them to his aunt in Baltimore, Alice hanged herself. Guilt-stricken by Alice's death, Rufus nearly commits suicide himself.

After Alice's funeral, Dana uses that guilt to convince Rufus to free his children by Alice. Rufus keeps Dana at his side almost constantly, having her share meals and teach his children. Eventually he admits that he wants Dana to be Alice's replacement. He thinks that unlike Alice, who, despite growing used to him, never stopped trying to escape, Dana will see that he is a fair master and eventually stop hating him. Horrified at the idea of ever forgiving Rufus, Dana flees to the attic to get her knife. Rufus follows her, and when he attempts to rape her, Dana stabs him twice. Nigel arrives to see Rufus's death throes, at which point Dana becomes terribly sick and time travels home for the last time. She finds herself in excruciating pain, as her arm had been left joined to a wall in the spot where Rufus was holding it.

=== Epilogue ===
When Dana and Kevin travel to Baltimore to investigate archival records about the fate of the Weylin plantation after Rufus's death, they find little: a newspaper notice reporting Rufus's death as a result of his house catching fire and a slave sale announcement listing the Weylin slaves except Nigel, Carrie, Joe, and Hagar. Dana speculates that Nigel covered up Rufus's murder by starting the fire and feels responsible for the sale of the slaves. Kevin responds that she cannot do anything about the past, and now that Rufus is finally dead, they can return to their peaceful life together.

== Characters ==
- Edana (Dana) Franklin: A 26-year-old African-American woman writer, she is the protagonist and the narrator of the story. She is married to a white writer named Kevin. She repeatedly travels in time to a slave plantation in antebellum Maryland, where she first encounters a white ancestor as the boy Rufus. There Dana has to make hard compromises to survive and to ensure her life in her own time.
- Kevin Franklin: Dana's husband is a white writer twelve years older than she. Kevin loves her deeply and became estranged from his family to marry her. When he travels with Dana to the past, he witnesses the brutality of slavery and becomes an abolitionist, also helping slaves escape to freedom.
- Rufus Weylin: The red-haired son of white planter Tom Weylin and his wife; the father owns a Maryland plantation and numerous slaves. As Dana returns, she sees the adult Rufus replace his father as master. Rufus rapes Alice, a free black woman, and their mixed-race daughter Hagar later becomes one of Dana's maternal ancestors.
- Tom Weylin: The owner of an antebellum Maryland plantation, he is a hard master and father, insisting on obedience from family and slaves. He whips Dana on multiple occasions, and authorizes the selling of his slaves' children. He is likened to Kevin in looks.
- Alice Greenwood (later, Alice Jackson): She was born free and is a proud Black woman. Later she is enslaved as punishment for having helped her enslaved husband Isaac try to escape. Rufus buys Alice and forces her to become his concubine. Two of their children survive: Joe and Hagar. She hangs herself after Rufus leads her to believe he has sold her children.
- Sarah: The cook of the Weylin household is its domestic manager; she tries to protect the house slaves while making them work hard. Tom Weylin sold all of Sarah's children except her mute daughter Carrie.
- Margaret Weylin: The plantation owner's wife indulges their son Rufus. Both she and her husband are abusive to the house slaves. She leaves after her infant twins die and returns with an opium addiction.
- Hagar Weylin: Rufus and Alice's youngest daughter. Hagar is a direct ancestor of Dana through her maternal line.
- Luke: A slave at the Weylin plantation who works as Weylin's overseer. Weylin sells him for not being sufficiently obedient.
- Nigel: The son of Luke and an enslaved woman at the Weylin plantation. He and Rufus were playmates as children. Dana secretly teaches him as a child to read and write. When older, he tries to flee, but is captured. Held at the plantation, he forms a family with Sarah's daughter, Carrie.
- Carrie: Sarah's daughter is mute, but she helps Dana find the strength for the hard compromises she must make to survive. She becomes Nigel's wife.
- Liza: An enslaved woman jealous of Dana for what she thinks is special treatment, she snitches on Dana when she runs away. This results in Dana being caught and whipped.
- Tess: An enslaved woman whom Tom Weylin uses sexually.
- Jake Edwards: One of the white overseers on the Weylin plantation, he also abuses Tess sexually.

== Main themes ==
=== Realistic depiction of slavery and slave communities ===
Dana reporting on the slaves' attitude toward Rufus as slavemaster: "Strangely, they seemed to like him, hold him in contempt, and fear him all at the same time."

— Kindred, page 229.

Kindred explores how a modern black woman would deal with a slave society, where most black people were considered property; it was a world where "all of society was arrayed against you". During an interview, Butler said that, while she read slave narratives for background, she believed that if she wanted people to read her book, she would have to present a less violent version of slavery than found in these accounts.

Scholars of Kindred consider the novel an accurate, fictional account of many slave lives. Concluding that "there probably is no more vivid depiction of life on an Eastern Shore plantation than that found in Kindred", Sandra Y. Govan traces how Butler's book follows the classic patterns of the slave narrative genre: loss of innocence, harsh punishment, strategies of resistance, life in the slave quarters, struggle for education, experience of sexual abuse, realization of white religious hypocrisy, and attempts to escape, with ultimate success.

Robert Crossley notes that Butler's intense first-person narration deliberately echoes many slave narratives, thereby giving the story "a degree of authenticity and seriousness". Lisa Yaszek sees Dana's visceral first-hand account as a deliberate criticism of earlier depictions of slavery, such as the book and film Gone with the Wind, produced largely by whites, and even the television miniseries Roots, based on a book by African-American writer Alex Haley.

In Kindred, Butler portrays individual slaves as distinctive persons, giving each his or her own story. Robert Crossley says that Butler treats the blackness of her characters as "a matter of course", to resist the tendency of white writers to incorporate African Americans into their narratives just to illustrate a problem or to divorce themselves from charges of racism. Thus, in Kindred the slave community is depicted as a "rich human society": the proud yet victimized freewoman Alice; Sam the field slave, who hopes Dana will teach his brother to read and write; Liza, who frustrates Dana's escape; the bright and resourceful Nigel, Rufus's childhood friend who learns to read from a stolen primer; and, most importantly, Sarah the cook, who Butler develops as a deeply angry yet caring woman subdued only by the threat of losing her last child, the mute Carrie.

=== Master-slave power dynamics ===
Rufus expressing his "destructive single-minded love" for Alice in a conversation with Dana:

"I begged her not to go with him," he said quietly. "Do you hear me, I begged her!"

I said nothing. I was beginning to realize that he loved the woman—to her misfortune. There was no shame in raping a black woman, but there could be shame in loving one.

"I didn't want to just drag her off into the bushes," said Rufus. "I never wanted it to be like that. But she kept saying no. I could have had her in the bushes years ago if that was all I wanted." ... "If I lived in your time, I would have married her. Or tried to."

— Kindred, page 124.

Scholars have argued that Kindred complicates common representations of chattel slavery as an oppressive system dominated by the master and economic goals. Pamela Bedore notes that while Rufus seems to hold all the power in relationship to Alice, she never wholly surrenders to him. Alice's suicide can be read as her "final upsetting of their power balance", and an escape from him through death. By placing Kindred in comparison to other Butler novels such as Dawn, Bedore explores the bond between Dana and Rufus as re-envisioning slavery as a "symbiotic" interaction between slave and master: since neither character can exist without the other, they are continually forced to collaborate in order to survive. The master does not simply control the slave but depends on her. From the side of the slave, Lisa Yaszek notices conflicting emotions: in addition to fear and contempt, affection may be felt for the familiar whites and their occasional kindnesses. A slave who collaborates with the master to survive is not reduced to a "traitor to her race" or to a "victim of fate."

Kindred portrays the exploitation of black female sexuality as a main site of the historic struggle between master and slave. Diana Paulin describes Rufus's attempts to control Alice's sexuality as a means to recapture power he lost when she chose Isaac as her sexual partner. Compelled to submit sexually to Rufus, Alice divorces her desire to preserve a sense of self. Similarly, Dana reconstructs her sexuality while time traveling to survive. While in the present, Dana chooses her husband and enjoys sex with him. In the past, her status as a black female forced her to submit to the master as sexual property. Rufus as an adult attempts to control Dana's sexuality, and attempts rape to use her to replace Alice. By killing Rufus, Dana rejects the role of female slave, distinguishing herself from those who did not have the power to say "no."

=== Critique of American history ===
Dana obeying Rufus' instructions to burn her paperback on the history of slavery in America:

"The fire flared up and swallowed the dry paper, and I found my thoughts shifting to Nazi book burnings. Repressive societies always seemed to understand the danger of 'wrong' ideas."

— Kindred, page 141.

Scholarship on Kindred often touches on its critique of the official history of the formation of the United States as an erasure of the raw facts of slavery. Lisa Yaszek places Kindred as emanating from two decades of heated discussion over what constituted American history, with a series of scholars pursuing the study of African-American historical sources to create "more inclusive models of memory." Missy Dehn Kubitschek argues that Butler set the story during the bicentennial of the adoption of the Declaration of Independence of the United States to suggest that the nation should review its history in order to resolve its current racial strife. Robert Crossley believes that Butler dates Dana's final trip to her Los Angeles home on the Bicentennial to connect the personal with the social and the political. The power of this national holiday to erase the grim reality of slavery is negated by Dana's living understanding of American history, which makes all her previous knowledge of slavery through mass media and books inadequate. Yaszek further notes that Dana throws away all her history books about African-American history on one of the trips back to her California home, as she finds them to be inaccurate in portraying slavery. Instead, Dana reads books about the Holocaust and finds these books to be closer to her ordeals as a slave.

In several interviews, Butler mentioned that she wrote Kindred to counteract stereotypical conceptions of the submissiveness of slaves. While studying at Pasadena City College, Butler had heard a young man from the Black Power Movement express his contempt for older generations of African Americans for what he considered their shameful submission to white power. Butler realized the young man did not have enough context to understand the necessity to accept abuse just to keep oneself and one's family alive and well. Thus, Butler resolved to create a modern African-American character, who would go back in time to see how well he (Butler's protagonist was originally male) could withstand the abuses his ancestors had suffered.

As Ashraf A. Rushdy explains, Dana's memories of her enslavement become a record of the "unwritten history" of African Americans, a "recovery of a coherent story explaining Dana's various losses." By living these memories, Dana makes connections between slavery and contemporary late 20th century social situations, including the exploitation of blue-collar workers, police violence, rape, domestic abuse, and racial segregation.

=== Trauma and its connection to historical memory (or historical amnesia) ===
Kindred reveals the repressed trauma that slavery caused in the United States' collective historical memory. In an interview in 1985, Butler suggested that this trauma comes partly from attempts to forget America's dark past: "I think most people don't know or don't realize that at least 10 million blacks were killed just on the way to this country, just during the middle passage....They don't really want to hear it partly because it makes whites feel guilty." In a later interview with Randall Kenan, Butler explained how debilitating this trauma has been, as she symbolized by having her protagonist lose her left arm.

She said:

"I couldn't really let [Dana] come all the way back. I couldn't let her return to what she was, I couldn't let her come back whole and [losing her arm], I think, really symbolizes her not coming back whole. Antebellum slavery didn't leave people quite whole."

Many academics have extended Dana's loss as a metaphor for the "lasting damage of slavery on the African American psyche" to include other meanings. For example, Pamela Bedore interprets it as the loss of Dana's naïveté regarding the supposed progress of racial relations in the present. For Ashraf Rushdy, Dana's missing arm is the price she must pay for her attempt to change history. Robert Crossley quotes Ruth Salvaggio as inferring that the amputation of Dana's left arm is a distinct "birthmark" that represents a part of a "disfigured heritage." Scholars have also noted the importance of Kevin having his forehead scarred during his travel to the past. Diana R. Paulin argues that it symbolizes Kevin's changing understanding of racial realities, which constitute "a painful and intellectual experience".

=== Race as social construct ===
Kevin and Dana differing in their perspectives of the 19th Century:

"This could be a great time to live in," Kevin said once. "I keep thinking what an experience it would be to stay in it— go West and watch the building of the country, see how much of the Old West mythology is true."

"West," I said bitterly. "That's where they're doing it to the Indians instead of the blacks!"

He looked at me strangely. He had been doing that a lot lately."

— Kindred, page 97.

The construction of the concept of "race" and its connections to slavery are central themes in Butler's novel. Mark Bould and Sherryl Vint place Kindred as a key science fiction literary text of the 1960s and 1970s black consciousness period, noting that Butler uses the time travel trope to underscore the perpetuation of past racial discrimination into the present and, perhaps, the future of America. The lesson of Dana's trips to the past, then, is that "we cannot escape or repress our racist history but instead must confront it and thereby reduce its power to pull us back, unthinkingly, to earlier modes of consciousness and interaction."

The novel's focus on how the system of slavery shapes its central characters dramatizes society's power to construct raced identities. The reader witnesses the development of Rufus from a relatively decent boy allied to Dana to a "complete racist" who attempts to rape her as an adult. Similarly, Dana and Kevin's prolonged stay in the past reframes their modern attitudes. Butler's depiction of her principal character as an independent, self-possessed, educated African-American woman defies slavery's racist and sexist objectification of black people and women.

Kindred also challenges the fixity of "race" through the interracial relationships that form its emotional core. Dana's kinship to Rufus disproves America's erroneous concepts of racial purity. It also represents the "inseparability" of whites and blacks in America. The negative reactions of characters in the past and the present to Dana and Kevin's interracial relationship highlight the continuing hostility of both white and black communities to interracial mixing. At the same time, the relationship of Dana and Kevin extends the concept of "community" from people related by ethnicity to people related by shared experience. In these new communities, whites and black people may acknowledge their common racist past and learn to live together.

The depiction of Dana's white husband, Kevin, also serves to examine the concept of racial and gender privilege. In the present, Kevin seems unconscious of the benefits he derives from his skin color, as well as of the way his actions serve to disenfranchise Dana. Once he goes to the past, however, he must not just resist accepting slavery as the normal state of affairs, but dissociate himself from the unrestricted power white males enjoy as their privilege. His prolonged stay in the past transforms him from a naive white man oblivious about racial issues into an anti-slave activist fighting racial oppression.

=== The meaning of the novel's title: blood relations and interracial marriage ===
Kindred's title has several meanings: at its most literal, it refers to the genealogical link between its modern-day protagonist, the slave-holding Weylins, and both the free and bonded Greenwoods; at its most universal, it points to the kinship of all Americans regardless of ethnic background.

Since Butler's novel challenges readers to come to terms with slavery and its legacy, one significant meaning of the term "kindred" is the United States' history of miscegenation and its denial by official discourses. The literal kinship of black people and whites must be acknowledged if America is to move into a better future.

On the other hand, as Ashraf H. A. Rushdy contends, Dana's journey to the past serves to redefine her concept of kinship from blood ties to that of "spiritual kinship" with those she chooses as her family: the Weylin slaves and her white husband, Kevin. This sense of the term "kindred" as a community of choice is clear from Butler's first use of the word to indicate Dana and Kevin's similar interests and shared beliefs. Dana and Kevin's relationship, in particular, may signal the way for black and white America to reconcile: they must face the country's racist past together so they can learn to co-exist as kindred.

As Farah Peterson discusses in "Alone with Kindred", the novel stands out as one of the only works of 20th-century American literature to center an interracial couple as protagonists and explore interracial marriage as one of its main themes.

=== Strong female protagonist ===
Dana explains to Kevin that she will not allow Rufus to turn her into property:

"I am not a horse or a sack of wheat. If I have to seem to be property, if I have to accept limits on my freedom for Rufus's sake, then he also has to accept limits – on his behavior towards me. He has to leave me enough control of my own life to make living look better to me than killing and dying."

— Kindred, page 246.

In her article "Feminisms", Jane Donawerth describes Kindred as a product of more than two decades of recovery of women's history and literature that began in the 1970s. The republication of a significant number of slave narratives, as well as the work of Angela Davis, who highlighted the heroic resistance of the black female slave, introduced science fiction writers such as Octavia Butler and Suzy McKee Charnas to a literary form that redefined the heroism of the protagonist as endurance, survival, and escape. As Lisa Yaszek notes further, many of these African-American woman's neo-slave narratives, including Kindred, discard the lone male hero in favor of a female hero immersed in family and community. Robert Crossley sees Butler's novel as an extension of the slave women's memoirs exemplified by texts such as Harriet Ann Jacobs' Incidents in the Life of a Slave Girl, especially in its portrayal of the compromises the heroine must make, the endurance she must have, and her ultimate resistance to victimization.

Originally, Butler intended for the protagonist of Kindred to be a man, but as she explained in her interview, she could not do so because a man would immediately be "perceived as dangerous": "[s]o many things that he did would have been likely to get him killed. He wouldn't even have time to learn the rules...of submission." She realized that sexism could aid a female protagonist, "who might be equally dangerous" but "would not be perceived so."

Most scholars see Dana as an example of a strong female protagonist. Angelyn Mitchell describes Dana as a black woman "strengthened by her racial pride, her personal responsibility, her free will, and her self-determination." Identifying Dana as one of Butler's many strong female black heroes, Grace McEntee explains how Dana attempts to transform Rufus into a caring individual despite her struggles with a white patriarchy. These struggles, Missy Dehn Kubitschek explains, are clearly represented by Dana's resistance to white male control of a crucial aspect of her identity—her writing—both in the past and in the present. Sherryl Vint argues that, by refusing to have Dana be reduced to a raped body, Butler would seem to be aligning her protagonist with "the sentimental heroines who would rather die than submit to rape" and thus "allows Dana to avoid a crucial aspect of the reality of female enslavement." However, by risking death and killing Rufus, Dana becomes a permanent surviving record of the mutilation of her black ancestors, both through her one-armed body and by becoming "the body who writes Kindred." In contrast to these views, Beverly Friend believes Dana represents the helplessness of modern woman, and that Kindred demonstrates that women have been and continue to be victims in a world run by men.

=== Female quest for emancipation ===
After briefly considering giving in to Rufus' sexual advances, Dana steels herself to stab him:

"I could feel the knife in my hand, still slippery with perspiration. A slave was a slave. Anything could be done to her. And Rufus was Rufus — erratic, alternately generous and vicious. I could accept him as my ancestor, my younger brother, my friend, but not as my master, and not as my lover."

— Kindred, page 260.

Some scholars consider Kindred as part of Butler's larger project to empower black women. Robert Crossley sees Butler's science fiction narratives as generating a "black feminist aesthetic" that speaks not only to the sociopolitical "truths" of the African-American experience, but specifically to the female experience, as Butler focuses on "women who lack power and suffer abuse but are committed to claiming power over their own lives and to exercising that power harshly when necessary." Given that Butler makes Dana go from liberty to bondage and back to liberty beginning on the day of her birthday, Angelyn Mitchell views Kindred as a revision of the "female emancipatory narrative" exemplified by Harriet A. Jacobs's Incidents in the Life of a Slave Girl, with Butler's story engaging in themes such as female sexuality, individualism, community, motherhood, and, most importantly, freedom in order to illustrate the types of female agency that are capable of resisting enslavement. Similarly, Missy Dehn Kubistchek reads Butler's novel as "African-American woman's quest for understanding history and self", which ends with Dana extending the concept of "kindred" to include both her black and white heritage, as well as her white husband, while "insisting on her right to self definition."

== Genre ==
Publishers and academics have had a hard time categorizing Kindred. In an interview with Randall Kenan, Butler stated that she considered Kindred "literally" as "fantasy". According to Pamela Bedore, Butler's novel is difficult to classify because it includes both elements of the slave narrative and science fiction. Frances Smith Foster insists Kindred does not have one genre and is in fact a blend of "realistic science fiction, grim fantasy, neo-slave narrative, and initiation novel." Sherryl Vint describes the narrative as a fusion of the fantastical and the real, resulting in a book that is "partly historical novel, partly slave narrative, and partly the story of how a twentieth century black woman comes to terms with slavery as her own and her nation's past."

Critics who emphasize Kindred's exploration of the grim realities of antebellum slavery tend to classify it mainly as a neo-slave narrative. Jane Donawerth traces Butler's novel to the recovery of slave narratives during the 1960s, a form then adapted by female science fiction writers to their own fantastical worlds. Robert Crossley identifies Kindred as "a distinctive contribution to the genre of neo-slave narrative" and places it along Margaret Walker's Jubilee, David Bradley's The Chaneysville Incident, Sherley Anne Williams's Dessa Rose, Toni Morrison's Beloved, and Charles R. Johnson's Middle Passage. Sandra Y. Govan calls the novel "a significant departure" from the science fiction narrative not only because it is connected to "anthropology and history via the historical novel", but also because it links "directly to the black American slave experiences via the neo-slave narrative." Noting that Dana begins the story as a free black woman who becomes enslaved, Marc Steinberg labels Kindred an "inverse slave narrative."

Still, other scholars insist that Butler's background in science fiction is key to our understanding of what type of narrative Kindred is. Dana's time traveling, in particular, has caused critics to place Kindred along science fiction narratives that question "the nature of historical reality," such as Kurt Vonnegut's "time-slip" novel Slaughterhouse Five and Philip K. Dick's The Man in the High Castle, or that warn against "negotiat[ing] the past through a single frame of reference," as in William Gibson's "The Gernsback Continuum." In her article "A Grim Fantasy", Lisa Yaszek argues that Butler adapts two tropes of science fiction—time-travel and the encounter with the alien Other—to "re-present African-American women's histories." Raffaella Baccolini further identifies Dana's time traveling as a modification of the "grandfather paradox" and notices Butler's use of another typical science fiction element: the narrative's lack of correlation between time passing in the past and time passing in the present.

== Style ==
Kindred 's plot is non linear; rather, it begins in the middle of its end and contains several flashbacks that connect events in the present and past. In an interview, Butler acknowledged that she split the ending into a "Prologue" and an "Epilogue" so as to "involve the reader and make him or her ask a lot of questions" that could not be answered until the end of the story. Missy Dehn Kubitschek sees this framing of Dana's adventures as Butler's way to highlight the significance of slavery to what Americans consider their contemporary identity. Because "Prologue" occurs after Dana travels in time and "Epilogue" concludes with a message on the necessity to confront the past, we experience the story as Dana's understanding of what we have yet to understand ourselves, while the "Epilogue" speaks about the importance of this understanding. Roslyn Nicole Smith proposes that Butler's framing of the story places Dana literally and figuratively in media res so as to take her out of that in media res; that is, to indicate Dana's movement from "a historically fragmented Black woman, who defines herself solely on her contemporary experiences" to "a historically integrated identity" who has knowledge of and a connection to her history.

Kindred's story is further fragmented by Dana's report of her time traveling, which uses flashbacks to connect the present to the past. Robert Crossley sees this "foreshortening" of the past and present as a "lesson in historical realities." Because the story is told from the first-person point of view of Dana, readers feel they are witnessing firsthand the cruelty and hardships that many slaves faced every day in the South and so identify with Dana's gut-wrenching reactions to the past. This autobiographical voice, along with Dana's harrowing recollection of the brutality of slavery and her narrow escape from it, is one of the key elements that have made critics classify Kindred as a neo-slave narrative.

Another strategy Butler uses to add dramatic interest to Kindred's story is the deliberate delay of the description of Dana and Kevin's ethnicities. Butler stated in an interview she did not want to give their "race" away yet since it would have less of an impact and the reader would not react the way that she wanted them to. Dana's ethnicity becomes revealed in chapter two, "The Fire", while Kevin's ethnicity becomes clear to the reader in chapter three, "The Fall," which also includes the history of Dana's and Kevin's interracial relationship.

Butler also uses Alice as Dana's doppelgänger to compare how their decisions are a reflection of their environment. According to Missy Dehn Kubitschek, each woman seems to see a reflection of herself in the other; each is the vision of what could be (could have been) the possible fate of the other given different circumstances. According to Bedore, Butler's use of repetition blurs the lines between the past and present relationships. As time goes on, Alice and Rufus's relationship begins to seem more like a miserable married couple while Dana and Kevin become somewhat distant.

== Background ==
Butler wrote Kindred specifically in response to a young man involved in black consciousness raising. The man felt ashamed of what he considered the subservience of older generations of African Americans, claiming that they were traitors and stating that he wanted to kill them. Butler disagreed with this view. She believed that a historical context had to be given so that the lives of the older generations of African Americans could be understood as the silent, courageous resistance that it was – a means of survival. She decided to create a contemporary character and send her (originally it was a him) back to slavery, to explore how difficult a modern person would find it to survive in such harsh conditions. As Butler said in a 2004 interview with Allison Keyes, she "set out to make people feel history."

Butler's field research in Maryland also influenced her writing of Kindred. She traveled to the Eastern Shore to Talbot County where she wandered a bit. She also conducted research at the Enoch Pratt Free Library in Baltimore and the Maryland Historical Society. She toured Mount Vernon, the plantation home of America's first president, George Washington. At the time, guides referred to the slaves as "servants" and avoided referring to the estate as a former slave plantation. Butler also spent time reading slave narratives, including the autobiography of Frederick Douglass, who escaped and became an abolitionist leader. She read many grim accounts, but decided she needed to moderate events in her book in order to attract enough readers.

== Reception ==
Kindred is Butler's best-selling book, with Beacon Press advertising it as "the classic novel that has sold more than 450,000 copies."

Among Butler's peers, the novel has been well received. Speculative writer Harlan Ellison praised Kindred as "that rare magical artifact... the novel one returns to again and again", while writer Walter Mosley described the novel as "everything the literature of science fiction can be".

Book reviewers were enthusiastic. Los Angeles Herald-Examiner writer Sam Frank described the novel as "[a] shattering work of art with much to say about love, hate, slavery, and racial dilemmas, then and now." Reviewer Sherley Anne Williams from Ms. defined the novel as "a startling and engrossing commentary on the complex actuality and continuing heritage of American slavery. Seattle Post-Intelligencer writer John Marshall said that Kindred is "the perfect introduction to Butler's work and perspectives for those not usually enamored of science fiction." The Austin Chronicle writer Barbara Strickland declared Kindred to be "as much a novel of psychological horror as it is a novel of science fiction."

High school and college courses have frequently chosen Kindred as a text to be read. Linell Smith of The Baltimore Sun describes it as "a celebrated mainstay of college courses in women's studies and black literature and culture." Speaking at the occasion of Beacon Press' reissue of Kindred for its 25th anniversary, African-American literature professor Roland L. Williams said that the novel has remained popular over the years because of its crossover appeal, which "continues to find a variety of audiences--fantasy, literary and historical" and because "it is an exceedingly well-written and compelling story... that asks you to look back in time and at the present simultaneously."

Communities and organizations also choose this novel for common reading events. In 2003, Rochester, New York selected Kindred as the novel to be read during the third annual "If All of Rochester Read the Same Book." Approximately 40,000 to 50,000 people participated by reading Kindred and joining panel discussions, lectures, film viewings, visual arts exhibitions, poetry readings, and other events from February 2003 until March 2003. The town discussed the book in local groups, and from March 4–7 met Octavia Butler during her appearances at colleges, community centers, libraries, and bookstores. In the spring of 2012, Kindred was chosen as one of thirty books to be given away as part of World Book Night, a worldwide event conducted to encourage love for books and reading by giving away hundreds of thousand of free paperbacks in one night.

== Adaptations ==
- Seeing Ear Theatre. "Kindred: An Online Dramatic Presentation." 2001. (This audio play adaptation stars Alfre Woodard as "Dana" and was produced by Brian Smith and Jacqueline Cuscuna for Seeing Ear Theatre. It also features award-winning actresses Lynn Whitfield and Ruby Dee.)
- Duffy, Damian (Adapter) and John Jennings (Illustrator). Kindred: A Graphic Novel Adaptation. Abrams ComicArts. January 10, 2017. ISBN 141970947X (10) ISBN 978-1419709470 (13)

=== Television ===
The first season of a television adaptation was shot in 2022, for FX. The 8 episodes starred Mallori Johnson as Dana, Micah Stock as Kevin, Ryan Kwanten as Tom Weylin, Gayle Rankin as Margaret Weylin, Austin Smith as Luke, Sophina Brown as Sarah, and David Alexander Kaplan as Rufus Weylin. The series premiered all 8 episodes on December 13, 2022, on Hulu. The episodes of season one cover the first three chapters of the novel, The River, The Fire, and The Fall, though some major changes from the novel have been made for the series, including setting the current day in 2016 rather than 1976, having Dana and Kevin not married but in a new relationship, and adding Dana's mother Olivia as a new character who also travels through time. In January 2023, it was reported that the series had been canceled after one season.
