= Dessa Rose (musical) =

Musical

- Cast album cover
- Music: Stephen Flaherty
- Lyrics: Lynn Ahrens
- Book: Lynn Ahrens
- Basis: novel by Sherley Anne Williams
- Productions: 2005 Off Broadway; 2014 West End

Dessa Rose is a musical based on the novel of the same name by Sherley Anne Williams with book and lyrics by Lynn Ahrens and music by Stephen Flaherty. It tells the story of a young black woman and a young white woman and their journey to acceptance in 1847 in the ante-bellum South, as they tell their story to their grandchildren.

== Productions ==
Dessa Rose had a workshop in Summer 2003 with Donna Murphy and LaChanze.

Dessa Rose premiered at the Mitzi E. Newhouse Theater at Lincoln Center, New York City, from February 17 in previews, officially March 21 to May 29, 2005. The director and choreographer was Graciela Daniele, with Set Design by Loy Arcenas, Costume Design by Toni-Leslie James, Lighting Design by Jules Fisher and Peggy Eisenhauer, and Orchestrations by William David Brohn and Christopher Jahnke. The cast featured LaChanze as Dessa Rose and Rachel York as Ruth.

A regional production was staged by TheatreWorks, Palo Alto, California, October 7, 2006 through October 29. Linda Mugleston and Carly Hughes were featured.

The New England Premiere was at New Repertory Theatre in 2008. It was directed by Rick Lombardo. Music direction was by Todd Gordon, choreography by Kelli Edwards, fight direction by Meron Langsner, sets by Peter Colao, costumes by Frances Nelson McSherry, and lights by Frank Messiner Jr. It starred Leigh Barret, Uzo Aduba, and Todd Allan Johnson.

The European premiere was at the Trafalgar Studios in London, 29 July to 30 August 2014. The cast included Cynthia Erivo, Cassidy Janson, Edward Baruwa, Sharon Benson and Miquel Brown.

A cast album was recorded on May 2, 2005 and released by Jay Productions.

The music contains "American roots music — blues, folk, different hymns, early kinds of gospel, the idea of call-and-response, which was a coded way the slaves communicated so that the white people thought they were just singing."

== Synopsis ==
Act I

As the play opens, two elderly women, Dessa Rose and Ruth, introduce the story of their youth when their paths crossed and sing of the importance of lineage and remembering those who came before ("We Are Descended"). The rest of the story is told in flashback as Dessa and Ruth narrate in each other's chapters.

Dessa Rose is a 16-year-old slave living on the Steele plantation with her mother, Rose ("Comin' Down the Quarters"). Dessa is also in love with a fellow slave, Kaine. Kaine tells Dessa of the history behind his most prized possession - his self-made banjo - and how an older man from Africa taught him about the instrument and lands where they cannot be enslaved ("Ol' Banjar"). Dessa and Kaine's relationship eventually leads to pregnancy. While her mother tries to convince her to abort it, Dessa tells her mother and Kaine that the baby will be the first thing in her life that is her own ("Something of My Own.") Dessa then promises Kaine that she will only give the baby its name when they are free.

Some months later, Dessa sits in a jail cell, where she is visited by Adam Nehemiah, an aspiring author who is gathering information for a book who is writing on "the female of the species." He explains that she is awaiting execution for murder, but that her jailers are holding off her hanging until her baby is born so that it can be sold. In the intervening time, Adam wants to interview the "Devil Woman" as she is now called, believing that her story will be the centerpiece of his book ("Ink"). Dessa agrees to tell him her story: one day Kaine got into an argument with Mrs. Steele and she broke his banjo. Kaine then lashed out at her in anger, and she killed him by hitting him in the throat with a shovel. As Kaine's body was dragged away, Dessa attacked Mrs. Steele, which led to her being whipped, branded, and sold away to Trader Wilson ("The Gold Band"). Dessa doesn't tell Adam about the two slaves she met on the band: Nathan and Harker, a duo who had already escaped from several traders. The two comfort her as she recovers from her wounds, as Nathan points out his favorite constellations ("Little Star"). That night, Trader Wilson got drunk and tried to rape Dessa, but she overpowered him and strangled him to death with her chain. She then freed her fellow captives, though Nathan and Harker tried to stay help her. This led to her capture and current imprisonment ("The Gold Band - reprise").

The story then shifts to the 20-year-old Ruth, the black sheep of a wealthy Southern family. Ruth is the least favorite of her mother's, who prefers her more sociable and obedient sister. Nevertheless, she still forces Ruth to follow all the rules of Southern etiquette to an oppressive degree. This is in sharp contrast to her mammy, who encourages Ruth to be more free-spirited ("Ladies"). At a dance, Ruth meets Bertie Sutton, a young gentleman who is immediately smitten with her ("Bertie's Waltz.") Bertie and Ruth quickly marry and he takes her to his farm, the Glen, which is still in the midst of construction. Bertie buys Ruth's mammy from her mother, which helps ease her anxieties. However, she quickly discovers that Bertie is losing his fortune gambling, and his trips away from the Glen become longer and longer, even after the birth of their daughter and Ruth's mammy passes away. In the midst of her loneliness, Ruth worries that Bertie may never return ("At the Glen.") Gradually, runaway slaves, including Nathan and Harker, catch word of the farm where the master is never present, and Ruth allows them to stay on her property.

Back in Dessa's jail cell, Adam writes to his fiancée (whose father is also the publisher of his book) of his anticipated success in taking Dessa's story. In his journal, Adam writes of how he is taken in by Dessa's determination and spirit, acknowledging that he finds it difficult to properly illustrate her as a character ("Capture the Girl"). As he slowly begins to sympathize with her, she asks if they can continue the interview outside as long as she remains shackled. As they sit on the grass, Dessa asks Adam if he believes that she has a soul. He tells her that he does now, and she says that she believes he does too. Meanwhile, Dessa still clings on to the hope of freedom, both for herself and her baby ("Fly Away"). One night, Dessa asks Adam to see if the Sheriff can remove her shackles as she sleeps. While he is gone, the Sheriff's slave brings in Dessa's bucket to wash herself and sneaks in a nail file. Dessa thanks her and begins furiously cutting away at her shackles, freeing herself just in time for Adam to return. In order to escape, Dessa knocks him out with the bucket and flies the coup with the help of fellow slaves. When Adam comes to, he and the Sheriff interrogate the slaves as to how Dessa escaped; they save themselves from punishment by playing the part of dumb-founded slaves and inventing a narrative where Dessa frightened them into submission ("Terrible"). In spite, Adam vows to find Dessa and see her hanged, with her execution serving as the end of his book.

Dessa makes it to the Glen in time to give birth. The stress of childbirth, combined with her injuries, causes her to pass out. When Ruth discovers the new slave and her newborn, she orders that Dessa be brought into her bed to recover. When Dessa finally regains consciousness, she finds Ruth nursing her baby, a girl, and contemplating what name she should have. Dessa angrily tells her to stop, suspicious of the white woman ("Their Eyes Are Clear, Blue Like Sky"). Ruth dismisses Dessa, telling her that she's in no condition to nurse. An argument erupts, culminating with Dessa telling Ruth the baby does not need a name. Ruth relinquishes, leaving Dessa with her newborn daughter. Dessa tells the story of her mother's children, and how she, Dessa, is the only one of twelve children still living and the only one who was named by her family, and not white slaveowners. Dessa tells her daughter that she will get a name once they are both free, reiterating the promise she made to Kaine ("Twelve Children").

Act II

Reopening at the Glen, Dessa cares for her daughter while getting to know the other runaways. Ruth, still waiting for Bertie to return, allows the runaways to freely wander around the property, and bonds with Nathan as he goes fishing. All the characters dream of being free - Dessa and the runaways from slavery, and Ruth from the Glen ("Noah's Dove"). Dessa and Ruth still share a contentious relationship, though Ruth has her stay in the house often to care for her baby. When Dessa confronts Ruth on the subject of her late mammy, Ruth is forced to face the possibility that her mammy, who was enslaved, never really loved her. Ruth then finally remembers that mammy was not her name - it was Dorcas.

As Nathan and Ruth spend more and more time together, the other runaways tease him of his supposed affection for her. Nathan dismisses their claims and announces his plan to escape to freedom - his former master was a con artist named Mr. Crutch who would auction Nathan off to gullible white folks, and Nathan would escape, meet up with Mr. Crutch and they would split the money. Nathan plans to duplicate the scheme on a larger scale, with all the runaways collecting enough money to travel west, away from slave states ("The Scheme"). Later, Ruth tells Nathan that she overheard his plan and - realizing that Bertie is never coming back - wants a part in it. Later that night, Ruth and Nathan make love, while Dessa is visited by a vision of Kaine ("In the Bend of My Arm"). Dessa then accidentally discovers Ruth and Nathan together and is enraged. Ruth is thrown into a panic, feeling hated by everyone ("Better If I Died"). The next day, Ruth announces that they are all leaving to carry out the scheme, and she begins packing, as Dessa laments that she is coming along ("Ten Petticoats"). The team hits the road, with Dessa and Ruth more bitter at each other than ever and Nathan trying to keep feelings tame ("Just Over the Line"). The scheme works excellently in many different towns, with the team collecting thousands of dollars, which they agree to split with Ruth. Dessa often poses as Ruth's handmaid, accompanying her nearly everywhere. Meanwhile, Adam is still traveling, posting wanted signs with Dessa's physical description on them. However, most of the slaves brought to him are random women abducted by people trying to claim his reward. His fiancée writes to him, saying that she is leaving him for another suitor due to his long absence.

In one town, Ruth spends the night with one of the buyers, Mr. Oscar. The two get drunk trying to follow formalities, as Dessa tries to separate them ("A Pleasure"). Later that night, Mr. Oscar arrives in the bedroom where Ruth has passed out and tries to rape her, but she is rescued by Dessa and the two shoo him away. The incident leads to the women bonding, as they realize that, although in very different ways, they are both trapped in this society and, as women, they are susceptible to the same threats. They then nurse their respective daughters together, each allowing the other to assist - a friendship has finally emerges ("White Milk and Red Blood").

In the last town, the team has enough money, so Dessa and Ruth spend the day walking through town bonding. When Ruth goes off on her own, Dessa runs into Adam, who immediately recognizes her and orders Sheriff Pines to arrest her. Pines does not believe Adam's claims, as he has now garnered a reputation for being obsessed and delusional, but brings Dessa to his office nonetheless so she can be questioned. Ruth arrives and says that Adam is lying and that Dessa has been her slave for years, and that her name is Anna. Sheriff Pines is inclined to believe Ruth, but Adam tells him to check under Dessa's dress to see her scars and the branding on her thigh. Pines tells his own slave, Annabel, to go into the next room and check, as he claims Annabel always tells the truth. Dessa pleads with Annabel not to reveal her true identity, but Annabel is loyal. When she mentions her baby however, Annabel stops before lifting up Dessa's dress. Annabel tells Pines that she didn't see anything under Dessa's dress and he concludes that Adam has the wrong girl. In a last desperate attempt to capture her, Adam shows Pines his notes on Dessa's physical appearance. Pines looks at the notes, but tells him that nothing is written there, merely gibberish. Dessa and Ruth leave, and continue their journey west.

The elderly Ruth and Dessa complete the story, telling of how Dessa and the other runaways made it west and Ruth had them all freed. Dessa eventually fell in love with Harker, and the two grew to old age together. Ruth, unable, to continue her relationship with Nathan, parted ways with the group and left to Northern states where Dessa predicts she became an abolitionist. Adam's eventual fate is left unknown, though Ruth recalls that he never published his book, which is appropriate as "he didn't know half the story." The company sings their message - that the story of how they came to own themselves and those who died along that journey must never be forgotten. Dessa and Ruth never saw each other again, but always recall their friendship and how they were both freed. Dessa then closes the play by telling of how she kept her promise to Kaine and finally gave their daughter her name - Ruth ("We Are Descended - reprise").

== Original cast ==
Actor	Role
LaChanze	Dessa Rose (ages 16 and 80)
Rachel York	Ruth (ages 20 and 84)
Tina Fabrique	Rose, House Slave, Ada, Auntie Chole
Rebecca Eichenberger	Ruth's mother, Mrs. Steele, Susannah
Kecia Lewis	Dorcas, Field Hand, Gemina, Janet
Eric Jordan Young	Kaine, Field Hand, Philip
David Hess	Sheriff Hughes, Trader Wilson, Bertie Sutton, Parishioner, Auctioneer
Michael Hayden	Adam Nehemiah
William Parry	Robert Steele, Parishioner, Auctioneer, Mr. Oscar, Sheriff Pine
Norm Lewis	Nathan
James Stovall	Harker, Field Hand
Soara-Joye Ross	Field Hand, Parishioner, House Slave, Annabel

== Songs ==
Act I

- We Are Descended
- Comin' Down the Quarters
- Ol' Banjar
- Something of My Own
- Ink
- The Gold Band
- Little Star
- Ladies
- Bertie's Waltz
- At the Glen
- Capture the Girl
- Fly Away
- Fly Away / How Long Will It Be?
- Terrible
- Their Eyes Are Clear, Blue Like Sky
- Twelve Children

Act II

- Noah's Dove
- Fly Away (reprise)
- The Scheme
- In the Bend of My Arm
- Better If I Died
- Ten Petticoats
- Just over the Line
- A Pleasure
- White Milk and Red Blood
- We Are Descended (reprise)

== Awards and nominations ==
- 2005 Lucille Lortel Award Outstanding Lighting Design - Jules Fisher and Peggy Eisenhauer (nominee)
- 2005 Lucille Lortel Award Outstanding Sound Designer - Scott Lehrer (nominee)
- 2005 AUDELCO Costume Design - Toni-Leslie James (nominee)
- 2005 Outer Critics Circle Award Outstanding Off-Broadway Musical (nominee)
- 2005 Obie Award Performance – LaChanze (Winner)
