= Working Cotton =

1992 children's book

- Author: Sherley Anne Williams
- Illustrator: Carole Byard
- Cover artist: Carole Byard
- Language: English
- Genre: Children's literature
- Publisher: Harcourt Brace Jovanovich
- Publication date: 1992
- Publication place: United States
- Pages: 32
- ISBN: 0-15-299624-9

Working Cotton is a 1992 Caldecott Honor Book, Coretta Scott King Honor Book for Illustration, and an ALA Notable Book. It was written by Sherley Anne Williams and illustrated by Carole Byard. It was based on Williams's childhood experience in the Fresno cotton fields.

The Gale Group, an education, advocacy, and technology company that provides advisory curricula to libraries and schools, selected Working Cotton for its 2002 compendium Teaching Children Mathematics (Vol. 8, Issue 8), published by the National Council of Teachers of Mathematics, Inc., as they deemed the book a resource for teaching schoolchildren about increments of time and the hours on a clock. The Working Cotton entry in the compendium is called "Working Cotton: Toward an understanding of time" and was authored by Eula Ewing Monroe, Michelle P. Orme, and Lynnette B. Erickson.
