= Tina Fabrique =

American actress and singer

- Born: 1944 or 1945 (age 81–82); Harlem, New York City, New York, U.S.
- Occupations: Singer; actress

Tina Fabrique (born 1944 or 1945) is an American singer and actress known for performing on Broadway. She sang the original theme song for the children's show Reading Rainbow. When Fabrique was 16, she won an award from the Apollo Theater, in Manhattan. Other awards that she has received include the Kevin Kline Award and Florida's Carbonell Award for her portrayal of Ella Fitzgerald in the show Ella.

== Early life ==
Tina Fabrique was born in Harlem, New York, where she grew up singing at her church.

== Career ==
She has appeared on The Today Show, One Life to Live, and All My Children. She also sang the theme song for the HBO film Mike Mulligan and His Steam Shovel.

She originated the role of Mother Vera in the musical Abyssinia, presented by Musical Theater Works in 1987 at the CSC Repertory Theater.

In 2005, she originated the role of Ella Fitzgerald in Ella: Off the Record. She has continued to perform in the show, since renamed Ella The Musical, in various productions and tours through 2022.

== Theater credits ==
- Ensemble role in Truely Blessed (1990)
- Bella in Angel Levine (1995, Playhouse)
- 'da Singer in Bring in 'da Noise, Bring in 'da Funk (1999)
- Miss Jones in How to Succeed in Business without Really Trying (1999)
- Sara's friend in Ragtime (2000)
- Rose in Dessa Rose (2005, Mitzi E. Newhouse Theater)
- Melba Jones in 70, Girls, 70 (2006, Encores! staging)
- Mattie Michael in Women of Brewster Place (2007)
- Grandmother Ethel in The First Noel (2016)
- Medda Lark in Newsies (2017)
- Vivienne in The Haunted Life (2019)
- Duppy Mary in Marys Seacole (2022)
- Hattie McDaniel in (mis)UNDERSTANDING MAMMY: The Hattie McDaniel Story (2023)

== Awards and recognition ==
Year	Awards	Category	Work	Role	Result	Ref
2020	AUDELCO Awards	Outstanding Achievement Award	n/a	n/a	Won	
2024	Lucille Lortel Awards	Outstanding Ensemble	(pray)	Ensemble	Won	

== Sources ==
- Arnott, Christopher (2020-12-17). "Spirit of Ella returns in Christmas concert". Hartford Courant. pp. B3.
- Delp, Eric (2007-05-23). "You'll be jazzed to see 'Ella' at Asolo". The Bradenton Herald. p. 41.
- Ersten, Hap (2006-07-30). "Tina Fabrique is...Ella". The Palm Beach Post. pp. 101, 105.
- Harbaugh, Pam (2009-12-30). "Star of the show". Florida Today. p. 30.
- Isaacs, Bob; Karen, Isaacs (2010-10-14). "Ella - a must see". East Haven Courier. pp. A24.
- Sokol, Fred (2005-07-09). "Fabrique passionate as Ella". The Republican. p. 40.
- Okamoto, Sandra (1997-01-03). "Back in business". Ledger-Enquirer. p. 13.
- Rist, Curtis (1984-04-19). "Bright, Bold Entertainment from the Crossroads". Bernardsville News. p. 62.
- Rizzo, Frank (2010-09-19). "The life of a legend". Hartford Courant. pp. G01, G08.
- Sjostrom, Jan (2006-07-13). "'Ella' gains new lease on life". Palm Beach Daily News. pp. A1, A4.
- "Tina Fabrique to perform at Teaneck fundraiser". Northern Valley Suburbanite (South). 2018-01-25. pp. A5.
