= Sherley Anne Williams =

American poet, novelist, and vocalist (1944–1999)

- Born: August 25, 1944; Bakersfield, California, U.S.
- Died: July 6, 1999 (aged 54); San Diego, California, U.S.
- Occupations: Poet, novelist, professor, vocalist, playwright and social critic
- Writing career
- Notable works: Dessa Rose (1986); Working Cotton (1992)

Sherley Anne Williams (August 25, 1944 – July 6, 1999) was an American poet, novelist, professor, vocalist, jazz poet, playwright and social critic. Many of her works tell stories about her life in the African-American community.

== Biography ==
Sherley Anne Williams was born in Bakersfield, California, to Lena Leila Marie Siler and Jessee Winston Williams, who were migrant farm workers. She was the oldest of three sisters: Ruby, Lois, and Jesmarie. The family suffered from poverty and struggled to make ends meet most their lives. The kids would often have to help out with farming in order to get by.

She was raised in the projects on the east side of Bakersfield and picked cotton and fruit with her parents and three sisters in the fields and orchards of Fresno, California. Williams was eight when her father died of tuberculosis and was 16 years old when her mother died from a heart attack. Early on, Williams had been introduced to reading and fell in love with it, but that was quickly discouraged by her mother. She then went on to Fresno Middle school and had an eighth grade science teacher recognize her potential and encouraged her to take college prep courses. In 1968, Williams gave birth to her son John Malcom, becoming a single mother; following this her career began taking off and she moved to Providence Rhode, Island.

Williams graduated from Edison High School in Fresno, in 1962. In 1966, she earned her bachelor's degree in English at what is now California State University, Fresno, and she received her master's degree at Brown University in 1972. During her first year at Brown, in 1968, Williams received publicity for the first time, putting out a first person narrative of a short story "Tell Martha Not to Moan". The following year (1973), Williams became a professor of African-American Literature at the University of California at San Diego (UCSD). Over the course of her career at UCSD, Williams served as chair of the literature department from 1977 to 1980, traveled to Ghana as a senior Fulbright scholar in 1984, and a served as a visiting professor at USC, Stanford, and Sweet Briar College. In 1987, Williams was the Distinguished Professor of the Year by the UCSD Alumni Association.

In 1998, Williams was awarded the African American Literature and Culture Society's Stephen Henderson Award for Outstanding Achievement in Literature and Poetry.

Williams published two collections of poetry: The Peacock Poems (1975), which was nominated for a Pulitzer Prize and a National Book Award, and Some One Sweet Angel Chile (1982), also nominated for a National Book Award. Following the publication of Peacock Poems, Williams was firmly established as an important new voice in African American poetry. Upon publishing The Peacock Poems, Wesleyan University misspelled her name in the first edition, having to contradict it later. Her second poetry collection, Some Sweet Angel Chile, published in 1982, was a finalist for the Pulitzer Prize and received praise in the New York Times, having been translated to several languages and later adopted into a musical. She won an Emmy Award for her television performance of poems from this collection. Her novel Dessa Rose (1986) was nominated for a Pulitzer Prize, received two laudatory reviews in The New York Times in 1986, called "artistically brilliant, emotionally affecting, and totally unforgettable" by David Bradley was translated into several languages, and was adapted into a musical that premiered in 2005. Dessa Rose was also excerpted in the anthology Daughters of Africa, edited by Margaret Busby. Williams' one-woman play, Letters from a New England Negro (1992), was performed at the National Black Theater Festival in 1991 and at the Chicago International Theater Festival in 1992.

Williams wrote two picture books, Working Cotton (1992), which won the Caldecott Award of the American Library Association and a Coretta Scott King book award, and Girls Together (1997). For television, Williams wrote the programs Ours to Make (1973) and The Sherley Williams Special (1977). Williams published the groundbreaking critical study of African-American writing Give Birth to Brightness: A Thematic Study of Neo-Black Literature in 1972. She was also selected to write the introduction for Zora Neale Hurston's 1991 edition of Their Eyes Were Watching God.

Williams was also known for her music, which mainly consisted of blues and jazz poetry. In 1982 Williams wrote, recorded, and self-published her debut single titled "Some One Sweet Angel Chile", which was re-released by Blues Economique Records in 1984. The music for "Some One Sweet Angel Chile" was composed by Bertram Turetzky.

In the early 1990s Williams reconnected with Bertram Turetzky for some recording sessions for his album Compositions And Improvisations, which also featured various jazz and blues artists including Vinny Golia, Jerome Rothenberg, Quincy Troupe, and Nancy Turetzky. Williams is credited as a vocalist for her contributions to Turetzky's album. Three of the songs featured on the album were previously-written poems by Williams recorded in musical format: "One-Sided Bed Blues", "Big Red And His Brother", and "The Wishon Line". The album was recorded at Studio 101 in Solana Beach, California, during the summer of 1992, and released by Nine Winds Records in 1993.

Williams died of cancer on July 6, 1999, in San Diego, at the age of 54.

== Published works ==
=== Fiction ===
- Dessa Rose (1986)
- Working Cotton (1992)
- Girls Together (1999)
- Letters from a New England Negro (1992)

=== Poetry ===
- The Peacock Poems (1975) (as Shirley Williams)
- Some One Sweet Angel Chile (1982)

=== Non-fiction ===
- Giving Birth to Brightness: A Thematic Study in Neo-Black Literature (1972)
- "Meditations on History." In Mary Helen Washington, ed, Midnight Birds: Stories by Contemporary Black women Writers. New York: Anchor Books, 1980, 195–248.
- "Two Words on Music: Black Community." In Gina Dent, ed, Black Popular Culture: A Project by Michele Wallace. Seattle, WA: Bay Press, 1992, 164–72.
- "The Blues Roots of Contemporary Afro-American Poetry." In Dexter Fisher and Robert B. Stepto, eds, Afro-American Literature: The Reconstruction of Instruction. New York: Modern Language Association, 1978, 72–87.
- "Cultural and Interpersonal Aspects of Black Male/Female Relationships: Comment on the Curb." Black Scholar, 10, 1979: 49–57.
- "The Lion's History: The Ghetto Writes B(l)ack." Soundings 76. 2–3 (1993): 248.
- "Some Implications of Womanist Theory." In Angelyn Mitchell, ed, Within the Circle: An Anthology of African American Literary Criticism from the Harlem Renaissance to the Present. Durham: Duke University Press, 1994: 515–521.
