= Dessa (artist) =

Swiss artist

Deborah Petroz-Abeles
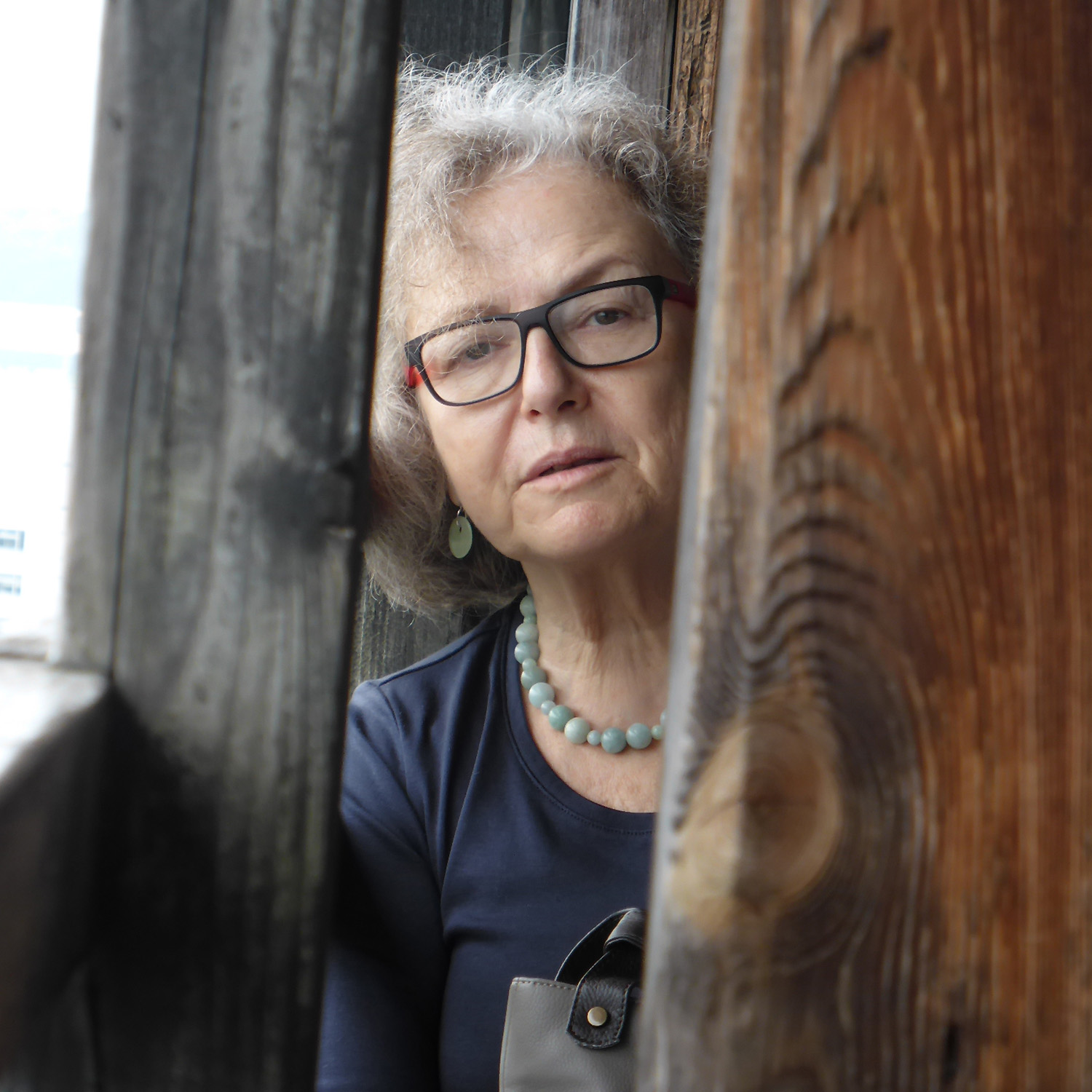
- Dessa at Matsue Castle, Japan, 2017
- Born: 20 December 1948 (age 77); Bulawayo, Southern Rhodesia

Deborah Petroz-Abeles (born Deborah Sharon Abeles; 20 December 1948), known professionally as Dessa, is a Swiss artist.

== Early life ==
Dessa was born on 20 December 1948 in Bulawayo, Southern Rhodesia (now Zimbabwe). Her mother, Emma Liebermann, came from a Polish-Jewish family in Warsaw, and her father, Leslie Abeles, was a Hungarian-Jewish physician from Debrecen who opened the first private medical practice in Bulawayo for Black Africans. Her maternal grandparents were murdered in the Shoah, and her paternal grandmother survived a forced-labor camp in Austria before returning to Hungary after the war.

As a young child, Dessa had instruction in ballet and piano, the latter playing a central role in her art. After completing school in Zimbabwe, Dessa moved to Israel in 1965, where she studied occupational therapy and lived until 1976. In 1977 she moved to Paris and then to Switzerland in 1981, becoming a Swiss citizen in 1983. She divides her time between Pully (Switzerland) and Berlin.

== Career ==
Dessa grew up in a society determined by racial divisions. This experience is reflected in her art, which synthesizes varied associations and engages with themes that extend across cultural contexts. Her creative output reflects her cultural background both in the subjects she chooses—through which she examines aspects of identity—and in the diverse media and methods she employs.

In her early period she investigated the relationship between visual art and music. Many works arose from extended engagement with specific musical compositions, augmented by musicological study, resulting in paintings in which musical structure informed her artistic decisions. Composers whose music has inspired visual responses include Béla Bartók, Leonard Bernstein, Ernst Bloch, Benjamin Britten, Unsuk Chin, Detlev Glanert, Dominique Gesseney-Rappo, Erich Korngold, Gustav Mahler, Olivier Messiaen, René Oberson, and Nino Rota.

Since 2000, her work has incorporated an increasingly historical dimension, including archival materials and research-based approaches.

== Visual works in dialogue with music ==
Dessa's art works are, in fact, dialogues expressed as paintings. They are dialogues that often resemble spiritual exercises. Because – if they are not in direct communication with a musician like today's improvisation – they require a lot of solitude, concentration and sacfrifice. With interlocutors such as Mahler, Schreker, Ullmann or Britten one simply cannot discuss. One has to love them, know them well, their ideas, their destiny, their tragedy. Without this, they do not open up to us.

The scope of her musical collaborators has enlarged to include living composers (Unsuk Chin und Detlev Glanert). Additionally she has collaborated on several "live-painting" concerts, e.g. Flying Colours and Musiques et Pinceaux, 2008.

The music of Viktor Ullmann, specifically the last Piano Sonata No 7, brought to life the loss of her grandparents in Auschwitz concentration camp. Ullmann, who had been deported to the Theresienstadt concentration camp, composed his final works there, before he was deported to the camp at Auschwitz-Birkenau, where he was murdered on 18 October 1944. Her 1997 project "Ein Vermächtnis aus Theresienstadt" (A Legacy from Theresienstadt) was exhibited both in the Berliner Dom in 2000 as well as in Theresienstadt in 2002.

The music gives rhythm to the gesture and allows the color to unfold... Dessa seizes the canvas, sets in motion powerful waves that burst into foam with their disheveled splatters, ground-swells that tear the surface of their irresistible force... Her instinctive fervor and impetuous passion are the temperament of a true painter.

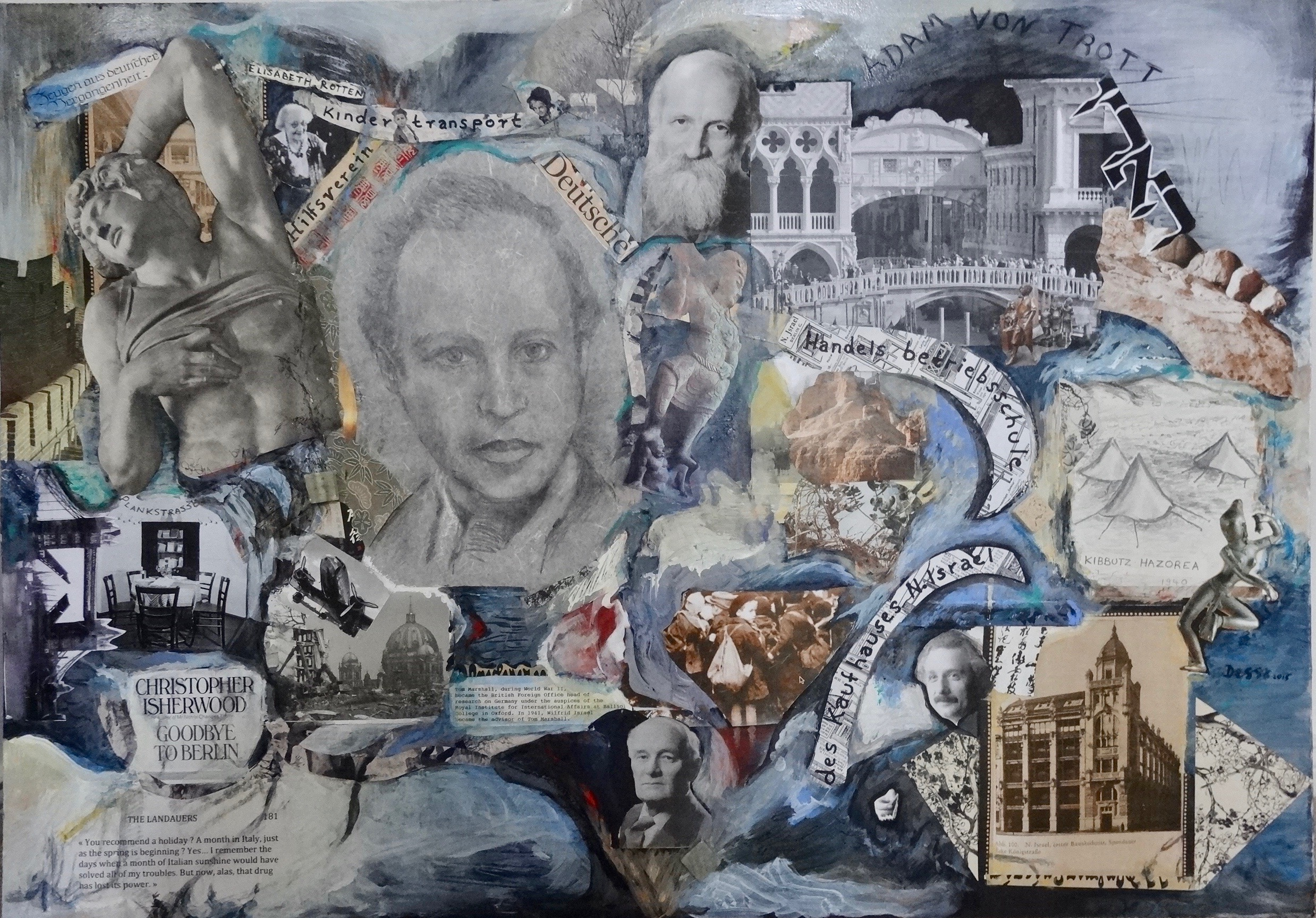
The World of Wilfrid Israel (2015)

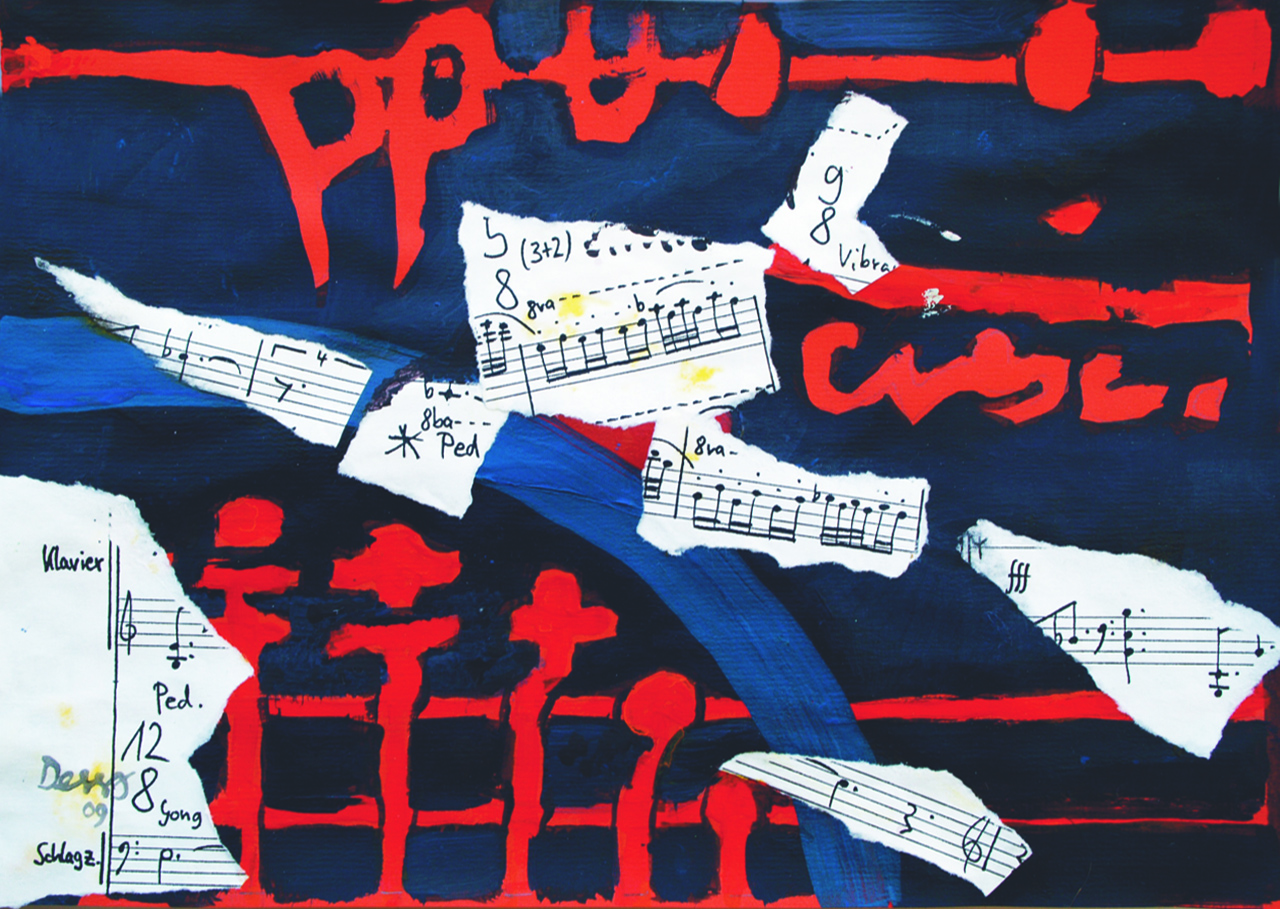
Fieramente (2009)

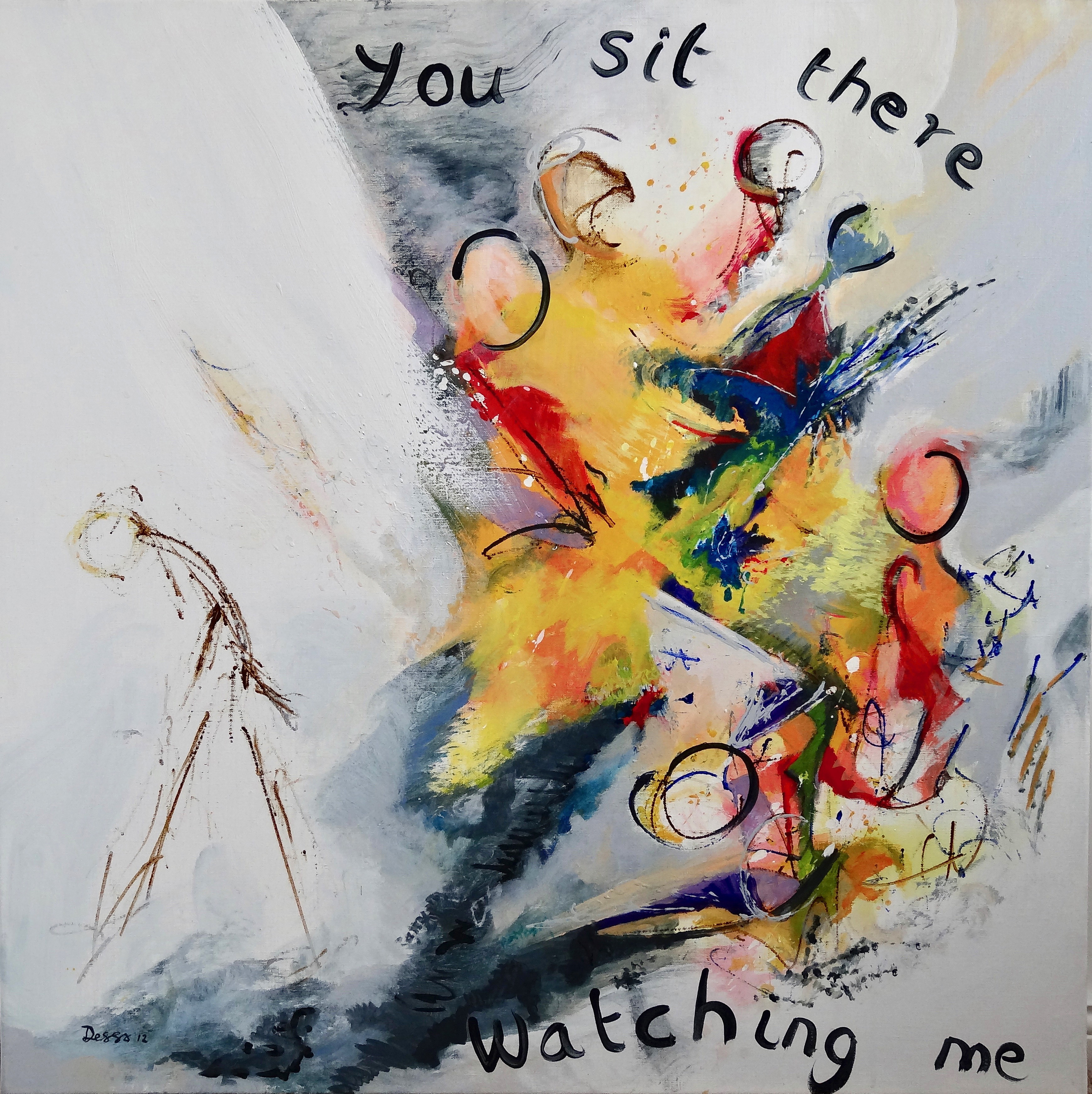
Passacaglia I (2012)

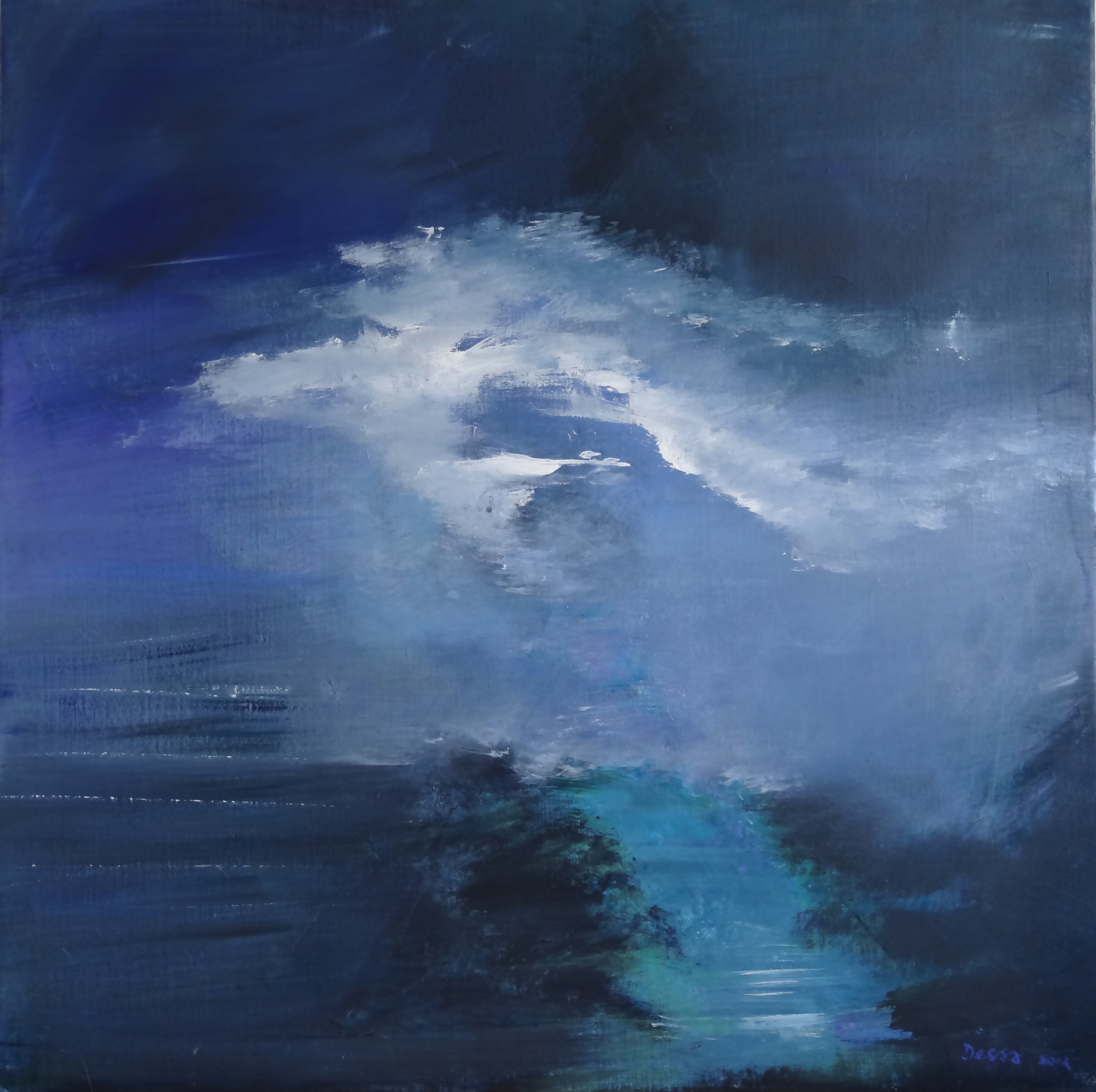
Moonlight II (2012)

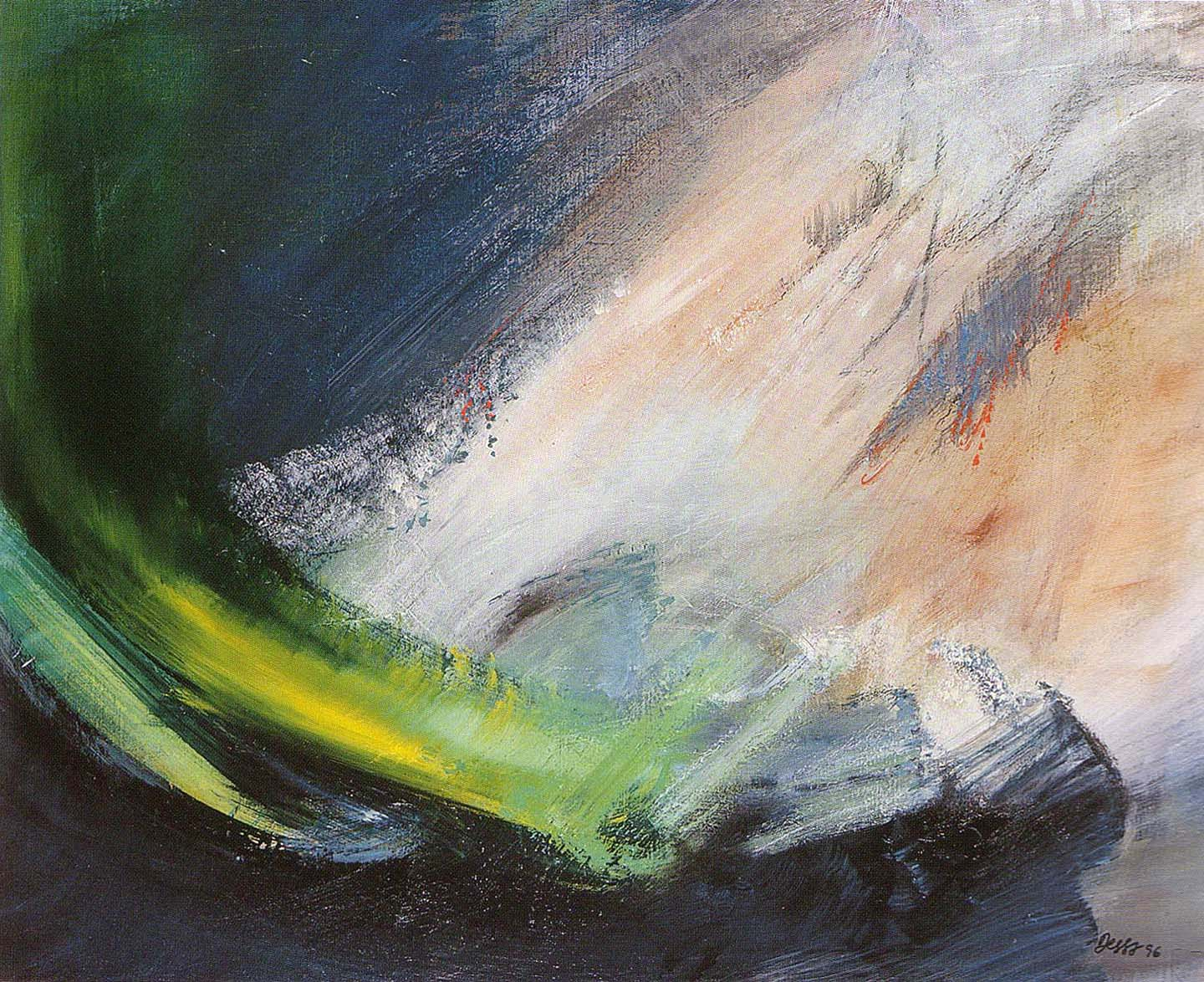
Adagio XXIV (1997)

== Visual works in response to the Shoah ==
An accidental discovery in an antique store in Berlin in November 2000 of a unique album entitled Die Hygiene im Wandel der Zeiten (Hygiene Throughout the Ages) developed into her most extensive project to date, a plethora of research resulting in a book as well as a new series of paintings as a tribute to the Kaufhaus Nathan Israel (Israel's Department Store), which existed from 1815 to 1939. The Kaufhaus N. Israel was not only for a time the largest department store in Berlin but also one of the largest retail establishments in Europe, employing over 2,000 people. The album that Dessa found was one in a series of fifteen annual publications that the Kaufhaus N. Israel published between 1900 and 1914.

Dessa created a series of paintings entitled "Stolzesteine", both as a tribute to N. Israel and as a reaction to the Stolperstein which she encountered in Berlin. In her view, the Stolperstein are a particularly problematical method of commemorating murdered Jews, nonetheleast because they are trampled on and dirtied. The artist is extremely critical of any "mass" project which collectively represents Holocaust victims by reducing their existence to a single symbol, as this method of portrayal invariably calls to mind the marking of Jews with the yellow star by the Nazis.

I looked up the word "Stolpersteine" in a dictionary and the next word underneath it, was "stolz" (proud) – it was an inspiration. During my research on the N. Israel firm, I learned they were proud that their firm stood right in the center of the town. I am proud too – to be a Jew, a woman, and from Africa. And so I developed the "Stones-of-Pride" as an alternative project to the stumbling stones.

By inserting a commemorative stone into her paintings, people "look up" to the person's life, thus honoring the memory of a person and their lifetime achievements, instead of "looking down" on them, as one does with a Stolperstein, which is set in the pavement. Dessa is very outspoken about the message that the Stolpersteine sends in contemporary society:

Ich fordere jeden Deutschen auf, sich zu überlegen, wie die Nazis der 30er-Jahre die Stolpersteine sehen würden. Meiner Meinung nach materialisiert dieses Projekt ihren größten Wunsch: Schaut, wie viele ermordete Juden es gab – das haben wir geschafft. (I challenge every German to reconsider, how the Nazis would react to seeing the Stolpersteine. In my opinion, the (Stolpersteine) project realises their final wish by proclaiming: look how many Jews we succeeded in murdering.)

In 2015, Dessa embarked on an multi-year project engaging with the legacy of Dr Alice Salomon, social reformer, educator, economist, feminist and peace activist, through her project titled "The Art of Remembrance: Alice Salomon." Salomon’s doctoral thesis expounded the inequality of wages between men and women, and she founded the Social School for Women in Berlin in 1908. Salomon was exiled from Germany in 1937 on account of her Jewish origins and international peace activities. In addition to her own research and writings, Dessa used various techniques to engage the viewer with Alice Salomon’s intensive and extensive life: paintings, collages, objects, installations and an imaginary conversation form a thorough narrative. As in many of Dessa’s other works, several paintings (here four separate portraits) feature a commemorative stone which has been inserted into the painting.

== Major exhibitions ==
- 1994: Galerie Bremer, Berlin – paintings based on Leonard Bernstein's Age of Anxiety
- 1997: Galerie Lilian Andrée, Basel – A Legacy from Theresienstadt – paintings from Viktor Ullmann's Piano Sonata No 7
- 1999: Galerie Bremer, Berlin – paintings based on Erich Korngold's Abschiedslieder
- 2000: Musée de Pully, Schweiz – Dessa: Abstraction lyrique 1990–2000
- 2004: Galerie Bremer, Berlin – collages and paintings A Tribute to Kaufhaus N. Israel 1815–1939
- 2005: Jüdisches Museum Westfalen – A Tribute to Kaufhaus N. Israel, Berlin 1815–1939
- 2006: Galerie Bremer, Berlin – Land Escapes
- 2006: Musée de Pully, Schweiz – From Hygiene to Art
- 2008: Musique et Pinceaux: Live-Painting, 5 collaborative concerts with the composer Dominique Gesseney-Rappo, conductor Blaise Heritier and the Flying Brass Orchestra. Film: Bernard Villat.
- 2008: Concerts de Monbenon, Lausanne – 10-year anniversary of Ph+Arts magazine. Lala Isakova, piano. Video-projection of the series Ein Vermächtnis aus Theresienstadt
- 2008: Foyer Amtsgericht, Stuttgart-Bad Cannstatt – Dessa: Land Escapes
- 2008: Exhibition in the Judaicum Center, Kraków, Poland – 20th anniversary of the International Contemporary Music Festival Kraków – paintings inspired by the music of Olivier Messiaen and Viktor Ullmann
- 2010: JayKay Gallery, Switzerland – Dessa: 2000–2010
- 2011: Galerie Petra Lange, Berlin – Dessa Komposition
- 2013: Galerie Petra Lange, Berlin: Do we smile or do we weep? Paintings based on the Four Sea Interludes and Passacaglia from Benjamin Britten's Peter Grimes. A Centenary Homage to Benjamin Britten, in collaboration with Boosey & Hawkes Music Publications
- 2013: Shanghai Art Fair, represented by Galerie Steiner, Vienna
- 2015: Espace culturel Assens – DESSA Peinture / Musique / Identité
- 2015: Galerie Petra Lange, Berlin – DESSA – In the Darkness, the Light – in collaboration with the Mitte-Museum Berlin
- 2015: Mitte Museum, Berlin – DESSA – Kaufhaus Nathan Israel 1815–1939 – Eine Künstlerin erforscht Geschichte
- 2017: Fondation l’Estrée, Ropraz, Schweiz – DESSA and VIKTOR ULLMANN
- 2018: frauen museum wiesbaden – The Art of Remembrance: Alice Salomon 1872-1948
- 2018: Ausstellungszentrum Pyramide Berlin – Kunst und Erinnern: Exhibition commemorating the anti-Semitic pogroms in November 1938
- 2022: Parliament of Berlin DESSA: The Art of Remembrance - Alice Salomon
- 2024: Ausstellungszentrum Pyramide, Berlin Commemorative event – The Art of Remembrance - Alice Salomon
- 2025: Vaud – Art: Echo of the Unspeakable

== Publications ==
- A Legacy from Theresienstadt: paintings inspired by Viktor Ullman’s Piano Sonata No. 7. Berlin 1997 ISBN 2-940223-00-9
- A Tribute to Kaufhaus N. Israel. Berlin 2003 ISBN 2-940223-03-3
- Composition (Music and Painting). Berlin 2010 ISBN 2-940223-05-X
- Do we smile or do we weep? Paintings based on Benjamin Britten's Four Sea Interludes and Passacaglia from Peter Grimes. Berlin 2013 ISBN 2-940223-06-8
- Stolzesteine – Stones of Pride. Berlin 2015 ISBN 978-3-95565-112-1
- The Art of Remembrance: Alice Salomon Berlin 2018 ISBN 978-3-95565-293-7

== See also ==
- Le Delarge, database of French artists
