= Soara-Joye Ross =

American actress and singer

- Occupations: Actress, Singer

Soara‑Joye Ross (also credited as Joy Ross, Joye Ross, and Joy E. T. Ross) is an American actress and singer known for her work in musical theatre. She appeared on Broadway in Hadestown and received the Lucille Lortel Award for Outstanding Featured Actress in a Musical for her performance as Frankie in Carmen Jones, alongside nominations for the Drama Desk Award and AUDELCO Awards. Ross has performed leading roles across the U.S. and internationally, including productions in the Netherlands, Belgium, and Basel, Switzerland. Noted for her versatility, she has portrayed Reno Sweeney (Anything Goes), Désirée Armfeldt (A Little Night Music), and Paulette (Legally Blonde). She was also one of the first Black actresses to play several leading roles in major regional productions. Ross earned acclaim for her Off-Broadway work in Single Black Female, a two-woman comedy directed by Colman Domingo.

== Career ==
=== Broadway ===
Soara-Joye Ross made her Broadway debut in Dance of the Vampires. She later appeared in the revival of Les Misérables and in Hadestown, where she performed as the accordion-playing contralto, Fate 3. She also understudied and performed the leading role of Persephone multiple times.

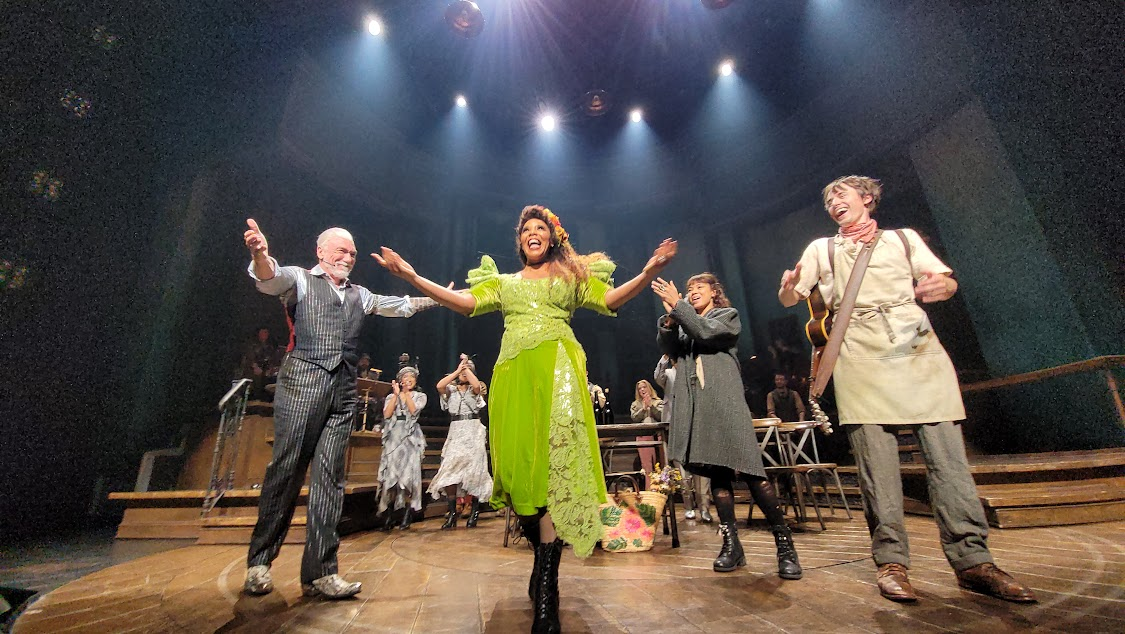
Ross as Persephone in Hadestown on Broadway.

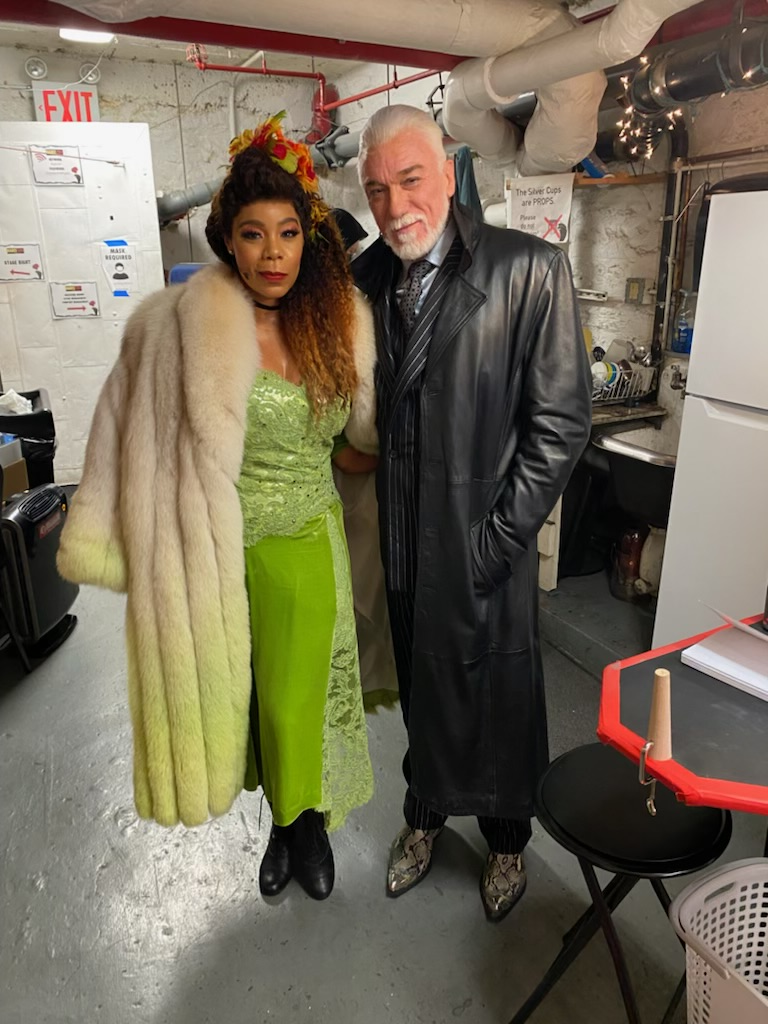
Backstage with Patrick Page (Hades) and Ross (Persephone) at Hadestown.

=== Off-Broadway ===
Ross appeared in John Doyle's production of Carmen Jones at Classic Stage Company, which received critical acclaim. The New York Times praised her performance as “the life force incarnate.”

Her other Off-Broadway credits include Single Black Female (directed by Colman Domingo), Disenchanted! at the Westside Theatre, Dessa Rose at Lincoln Center, Jerry Springer: The Opera at Carnegie Hall, The Tin Pan Alley Rag at Roundabout Theatre Company, and Promenade at New York City Center/Encores! Off-Center.

=== Tours and Regional Theatre ===
Ross has appeared in national and international tours of Ain’t Misbehavin’ (European tour, circa 1999), and Smokey Joe’s Café (national tour with Gladys Knight; European tour). She also appeared in The Gershwins’ Porgy and Bess (national tour, 2013–2014). She also performed overseas in Palazzo Colombino in Switzerland (circa 2008).

Ross starred in several regional premieres:

- My Best Friend’s Wedding – world premiere at the Ogunquit Playhouse, directed by seven-time Tony Award-winner Susan Stroman (2024).
- Divorce Party the Musical – premiere at the Kravis Center, followed by a national tour including West Palm Beach, Los Angeles and Fort Lauderdale (circa 2010–2011).
- Summer of Love – east coast premiere at the Ogunquit Playhouse (circa 2012–2013).

Her additional regional theatre credits include:

- Waitress – The Cape Playhouse (2024)
- Legally Blonde – Starlight Theatre (2023)
- Cinderella – Theatre Under the Stars (2023)
- A Little Night Music – Denver Center (2023)
- Young Frankenstein – Ogunquit Playhouse (2021)
- Anything Goes – Arena Stage (2018)
- The Call – Arkansas Repertory Theatre (2019)
- Nina Simone: Four Women – Alabama Shakespeare Festival (2019)
- Sister Act – Arkansas Repertory Theatre (2017)
- Tick, Tick... Boom! – Alliance Theatre (2005)
- Once on This Island – Actors Theatre of Louisville (2020); Sacramento Music Circus; Bay Street Theatre; Mill Mountain Theatre (various years)
- From the Mississippi Delta – Triad Stage (2003)
- Ragtime – Gateway Playhouse and Weston Playhouse (2002)
- Aida – Arvada Center (2001)

=== Workshops and NYC Premieres ===
Ross has originated leading roles in several new musicals and contributed to their development through workshops, readings, and cast recordings:

- In 2009, she starred in the New York Musical Theatre Festival (NYMF) production of Cross That River as Mama Lila and received the “Best of Fest” Award for Outstanding Individual Performance.
- In 2024, she created the role of Aria in the workshop of the new musical Marian, based on the life of Marian Anderson. The piece was directed by Tamara Tunie and explored themes of inner voice, ancestral strength, and artistic legacy.
- She appeared in The First Noel at the Apollo Theater (2015–2016), participating in its workshop and two premiere runs, and is featured on the cast recording.
- Ross was part of the original Off-Broadway cast of Disenchanted: The Musical and is featured on its 10th‑anniversary cast album edition.
- She performed in Dessa Rose at Lincoln Center Theater, originating her role in the workshop and appearing in the production—and on its original cast recording.

=== Concerts and Cabaret ===
Ross has appeared in concert with Connecticut's Waterbury Symphony Orchestra as part of “Broadway Scores,” alongside Debbie Gravitte and Andrea McArdle.

She has headlined solo cabarets such as This Is My Life: Gotta Fly at the Laurie Beechman Theatre and From Broadway to the World at the Metropolitan Club.

In 2021, she starred as Diana in the first-ever all-Black concert reading of Next to Normal.

=== Film and television ===
Ross appeared in the feature film Garden State as the Handi-World cashier. Her television credits include HBO's The Flight Attendant and Crashing.

=== Advocacy and Academic Engagement ===
Ross has a long-standing commitment to community support and arts education:

- In 2006, she co-founded OFF-STAGE, a support group for performers navigating the entertainment industry.
- In 2010, she co-facilitated ACT1 (Adults Coping with Type 1 Diabetes), a young women's support group for those living with Type 1 diabetes. ACT1 was co-founded by Dr. Katherine Savin.
- In 2020, she launched DIALICIOUS, a virtual support group for women living with Type 1 diabetes.

Ross has spoken on academic panels at institutions such as Hunter College, Sacramento State, and the University of the Pacific, where she shared insight on chronic illness, disability, identity, and resilience in the arts. In 2021, she gave a performative lecture on hypoglycemia, blending original performance with health education for graduate students studying social work. These appearances were organized by Dr. Katherine Savin.

She has also served as a mentor for young artists through the Vanguard Theater Company's Broadway Buddy Program.

Ross is a graduate of the American Musical and Dramatic Academy (AMDA). She has been invited multiple times to speak to AMDA's musical theatre students about performance, resilience, and embodiment in the arts. In addition, she was invited by the head of AMDA's musical theatre department in Los Angeles, Scott Conner, to review the school's music theatre curriculum.

== Personal background ==
Ross was born on August 16 in Queens, New York, and was adopted as an infant by Rita T. Ross (later Soares) and Joseph Ross. She was raised alongside her older adopted brother, David C. Ross, who is 11 months her senior. In 2005, she hired a private investigator and reunited with her birth mother, Lavonne D. Patterson. Through that journey, she also reconnected with her paternal grandmother, maternal grandfather, and later her birth father, Orick Sweetwine, as well as siblings, aunts, uncles, and her maternal grandmother. Her adoptive mother died in 2017.

Ross and her brother grew up in Queens and attended Bayside High School, where she was active in music and theater. As a member of the All-City High School Chorus, she performed as a soloist at Lincoln Center, Carnegie Hall, the Rainbow Room, and the MetLife Building, and toured internationally to Hungary, Austria, and beyond. In high school, she was also Homecoming Queen, cheerleading captain, and a soloist with the jazz band. She performed with the youth company of Black Spectrum Theatre in Jamaica, Queens, under the direction of Fulton Hodges, starring in productions that received AUDELCO Awards.

She began studying classical voice at age 12 with Vita Carter, a teacher she met through her church. Later, she studied with another voice instructor who lived near her paternal grandmother—though she was unaware of the family connection at the time. She majored in vocal performance at Nassau Community College, where she deepened her passion for musical theater. After starring in productions such as *She Loves Me* and *Ceremonies in Dark Old Men*, she transferred to the American Musical and Dramatic Academy (AMDA) with a scholarship—an experience she credits as pivotal in launching her professional career.

In 2007, while rehearsing a new musical for the New York Musical Theatre Festival, Ross was hospitalized in critical condition the day before opening night and was diagnosed with Type 1 diabetes. She later became actively involved with ACT1 Diabetes (Adults Coping with Type 1 Diabetes), co-facilitating its Young Women's Support Group and serving as Donations Coordinator for its Supply Exchange Program.

Ross resides in Queens, New York, where she grew up. She continues to perform professionally and has worked on original musical and literary projects.

Her first name, Soara, was given to her by her maternal grandfather—a Seminole man whom her birth mother described as a “chief.” While her mother was pregnant, he told her to name the baby Soara, because she would “soar to great heights.” Her adoptive mother named her Joy, explaining that the child brought joy into her life. Ross later added an “e” to her name—partly as a nod to her middle name, Eunice. She interprets her full name as meaning “Singing Bird Soars Joyfully,” and has said it perfectly reflects her spiritual identity and artistic journey.

== Training ==
Ross studied the Meisner Technique and sitcom acting at J. Beckson Studios, and completed a film audition workshop with Heidi Marshall. She attended the American Musical and Dramatic Academy (AMDA) and studied classical voice at Nassau Community College.

Her vocal coaches and technicians have included Jackie Presti, Scott Conner, Dr. Anat Keidar, Jack Waddell, and Dorothy Stone.

Ross has studied extensively with acting coach Lelund Durond Thompson, both in private sessions and in film audition workshops. She considers him her most recent and trusted acting coach, often turning to his guidance in preparation for major roles.

She trained in ballet, musical theatre, Horton technique, and tap for six years at The Ailey Extension in New York City. She was invited by Finis Jhung and Fernando Carrillo to regularly attend their classes, an experience she credits as deeply formative. She continues to practice their movement work independently.

== Awards and nominations ==
| Year | Award | Category | Work | Role | Result |
|---|---|---|---|---|---|
| 2024 | Colorado Theatre Guild Henry Award | Outstanding Performance by a Leading Actress in a Musical | A Little Night Music | Désirée Armfeldt | Nominated |
| 2021 | BroadwayWorld Award | Best Supporting Performer in a Musical | Young Frankenstein | Elizabeth Benning | Won |
| 2019 | Lucille Lortel Award | Outstanding Featured Actress in a Musical | Carmen Jones | Frankie | Won |
| 2019 | Drama Desk Award | Outstanding Featured Actress in a Musical | Carmen Jones | Frankie | Nominated |
| 2018 | AUDELCO VIV Award | Best Featured Actress in a Musical | Carmen Jones | Frankie | Nominated |
| 2006 | Colorado Theatre Guild Henry Award | Outstanding Performance by a Leading Actress in a Musical | Aida | Aida | Nominated |
| 2009 | New York Musical Theatre Festival – Best of Fest | Outstanding Individual Performance | Cross That River | Mama Lila | Won |

== Discography ==
Selected recordings
| Year | Title | Role | Composer(s) | Lyricist(s)/Book | Notes |
|---|---|---|---|---|---|
| 2024 | Black Swan Blues | Jasmyne | Randy Klein | Joan Ross Sorkin | Concept album / cast recording |
| 2019 | Disenchanted! | The Princess Who Kissed the Frog | Dennis T. Giacino | Dennis T. Giacino | 10th‑Anniversary studio cast recording at SPIN Studios |
| 2015/2016 | The First Noel | Deloris | Jason Michael Webb & Lelund Durond Thompson | Jason Michael Webb & Lelund Durond Thompson | Original cast, Classical Theatre of Harlem (Apollo Soundstage) |
| 2005 | Dessa Rose | Annabel & Others Ensemble | Stephen Flaherty | Lynn Ahrens | Original Off‑Broadway cast recording, Jay Records |
