= Dessa Rose =

1986 novel by Sherley Anne Williams

- First edition (publ. William Morrow
- Author: Sherley Anne Williams
- Publisher: William Morrow & Co
- Publication date: January 1, 1986
- ISBN: 978-0-688-05113-6

Dessa Rose is a novel by Sherley Anne Williams published in 1986 by HarperCollins. The book is a neo-slave narrative, incorporating many elements of traditional slave narratives. The book is divided into three sections: "The Darky", "The Wench" and "The Negress". The sections represent a different stage of growth in the life of the protagonist, Dessa Rose.

== Plot summary ==
The novel begins with Dessa Rose imprisoned in the basement of an Alabamian Sheriff in Marengo County, Alabama, for her contribution to a slave revolt. However, since Dessa is pregnant her life is spared, but only until after the birth of her child. Living on borrowed time, she is rescued by two fellow slaves and flees. They travel to a small plantation in Sutton managed by Ruth Elizabeth, or Mrs. Rufel. Her husband had departed on a business trip several years ago and never returned. When the slaves took off, Mrs. Rufel began harboring runaway slaves to replace them. During this time, Dessa gives birth to her baby and resides with Mrs. Rufel, who maintains a ruse of owning the slaves on her farm when in actuality she is offering refuge for runaway slaves. A plan is hatched to ensure a hefty financial reward for both Mrs. Rufel and the runaways. Mrs. Rufel must sell the slaves during the day, and then pick them back up at night, cheating the buyers out of their money. When the small band has accumulated enough money, the slaves will flee west and finally be free.

== Themes ==
One of the prominent themes in the novel is the sisterhood between Dessa Rose and Ruth Sutton which further contributes to the novel being regarded as a conjoining of womanist and feminist ideals. The novel is also interested in dealing with how motherhood is represented in Neo-Slave narratives. It is a story that deals with themes of enslavement and eventual liberation.

== Historical context ==
The book is based on two historical incidents. In the year 1829 in Kentucky, a pregnant slave woman led a revolt against slave traders. She was captured and sentenced to be executed, but only after the birth of her child. The following year in North Carolina, a white woman had reportedly been giving refuge to runaway slaves. The book combines the two stories, with the two women meeting and participating in a plan to free the runaways.

Dessa Rose was written as a response to William Styron's 1968 novel The Confessions of Nat Turner. The white man assuming the voice of an African-American man enraged the black community. In Dessa Rose, the author Sherley Anne Williams, a black woman, takes the voice of a white woman. Dessa Rose alternatively defines freedom and agency from a female character's perspective, using distinct literary techniques. Williams broke free of traditional stereotypes attached to this specific genre of slave narratives and showcased a new kind of multidimensional set of characters.

== Film adaptation ==
Irwin Winkler was going to direct a film adaptation in 1988 starring Natasha Richardson, Angela Bassett, Donald Sutherland, Laurence Fishburne, and Cicely Tyson; however, the film was shut down by United Artists days before shooting, with the studio writing off the $5 million (~$11.7 million in 2025) cost.
