= Kidman =

Kidman may refer to:

== People ==
- Antonia Kidman (born 1970), Australian journalist, daughter of Antony Kidman
- Antony Kidman (1938–2014), Australian biochemist and psychologist
- Fiona Kidman (born 1940), New Zealand novelist, poet, and scriptwriter
- Jens Kidman (born 1966), Swedish musician and vocalist
- Nicole Kidman (born 1967), Australian actress, daughter of Antony Kidman
- Sidney Kidman (1857–1935), Australian pastoralist who owned more than 3% of territory of Australia
- Billy Kidman (born 1974), or Kidman, ring names of American professional wrestler Peter Gruner

== Other uses ==
- Kidman Park, Adelaide, South Australia
- Kidman Way, State Highway 87 in New South Wales, Australia, named for Sidney Kidman
