= Nicole Kidman on screen and stage =

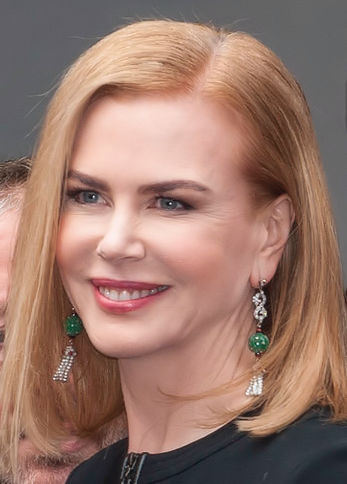
Kidman at the 2015 Berlin International Film Festival

Nicole Kidman is an Australian and American actress. She is known for her roles on stage and screen and won the Academy Award for Best Actress for her portrayal of Virginia Woolf in The Hours (2002). She was Oscar-nominated for playing a cabaret actress in Moulin Rouge! (2001), a grieving mother in Rabbit Hole (2010), a concerned mother in Lion (2016), and Lucille Ball in Being the Ricardos (2021).

She made her film debut in the Australian drama Bush Christmas in 1983. Four years later, she starred in the television miniseries Bangkok Hilton (1989) and had her breakthrough role as a married woman trapped on a yacht with a murderer in the thriller Dead Calm (1989). She followed this with her Hollywood debut opposite Tom Cruise in Tony Scott's auto-racing film Days of Thunder (1990).

She gained acclaim for her roles as a devious weather forecaster in Gus Van Sant's crime dramedy To Die For (1995), an unsatisfied wife in Stanley Kubrick's erotic thriller Eyes Wide Shut (1999), a woman hiding from mobsters in Lars von Trier's drama Dogville (2003), a preacher's daughter in Anthony Minghella's period war drama Cold Mountain (2003), and a widow confronted with a shocking discovery in Jonathan Glazer's psychological drama Birth (2004). She also starred in the romantic western Far and Away (1992), the superhero film Batman Forever (1995), the romantic comedy Practical Magic (1998), the gothic horror film The Others (2001), the sci-fi comedy film The Stepford Wives (2004), and the adventure drama Australia, and the musical Nine (2009). She then portrayed Grace Kelly in the biopic Grace of Monaco (2014) and an evil taxidermist in the comedy Paddington (2014).

She has focused on working with auteur directors such as Park Chan-wook in Stoker (2013), Yorgos Lanthimos in The Killing of a Sacred Deer (2017), Sofia Coppola in The Beguiled (2017), Robert Eggers in The Northman (2021), and Halina Reijn in Babygirl (2024). She has also acted in crime drama Destroyer (2018), the family drama Boy Erased (2018), the drama Bombshell (2019), the musical comedy The Prom (2020), and the romantic comedy A Family Affair (2024). She played Queen Atlanna in the DC Extended Universe films Aquaman (2018) and Aquaman and the Lost Kingdom (2023).

On television, she played novelist Martha Gellhorn in the HBO biopic Hemingway & Gellhorn (2012), for which she received her first Emmy Award nomination. For producing and starring in the HBO drama series Big Little Lies (2017–2019), she won the Primetime Emmy Award for Outstanding Lead Actress in a Limited Series or Movie and a Primetime Emmy Award for Outstanding Limited Series. She has also acted in the BBC Two crime series Top of the Lake: China Girl (2017), the HBO mystery series The Undoing (2020), the Hulu drama series Nine Perfect Strangers (2021–2025), the Paramount+ spy thriller series Lioness (2023–present), the Amazon Prime Video drama series Expats (2024), and the Netflix mystery series The Perfect Couple (2024).

== Film ==
Key
| † | Denotes films that have not yet been released. |

| Year | Title | Credited as | | Role | Notes | Ref. |
| Year | Title | Actor | Producer | Role | Notes | Ref. |
|---|---|---|---|---|---|---|
| 1983 | Bush Christmas | Yes | No | Helen Thompson | | |
| 1983 | BMX Bandits | Yes | No | Judy | | |
| 1985 | Wills & Burke | Yes | No | Julia Matthews | | |
| 1986 | Windrider | Yes | No | Jade | | |
| 1987 | The Bit Part | Yes | No | Mary McAllister | | |
| 1988 | Emerald City | Yes | No | Helen Davey | | |
| 1989 | Dead Calm | Yes | No | Rae Ingram | | |
| 1990 | Days of Thunder | Yes | No | Dr. Claire Lewicki | | |
| 1991 | Flirting | Yes | No | Nicola Radcliffe | | |
| 1991 | Billy Bathgate | Yes | No | Drew Preston | | |
| 1992 | Far and Away | Yes | No | Shannon Christie | | |
| 1993 | Malice | Yes | No | Tracy Safian | | |
| 1993 | My Life | Yes | No | Gail Jones | | |
| 1995 | Batman Forever | Yes | No | Dr. Chase Meridian | | |
| 1995 | To Die For | Yes | No | Suzanne Stone Maretto | | |
| 1996 | The Portrait of a Lady | Yes | No | Isabel Archer | | |
| 1997 | The Peacemaker | Yes | No | Dr. Julia Kelly | | |
| 1998 | Practical Magic | Yes | No | Gillian Owens | | |
| 1999 | Eyes Wide Shut | Yes | No | Alice Harford | | |
| 2001 | Moulin Rouge! | Yes | No | Satine | | |
| 2001 | The Others | Yes | No | Grace Stewart | | |
| 2001 | Birthday Girl | Yes | No | Nadia / Sophia (Note: Kidman plays a single character who has two different names.) | | |
| 2002 | The Hours | Yes | No | Virginia Woolf | | |
| 2002 | Panic Room | Yes | No | Stephen's girlfriend | Uncredited voice cameo | |
| 2003 | Dogville | Yes | No | Grace Margaret Mulligan | | |
| 2003 | In the Cut | No | Yes | —N/a | | |
| 2003 | The Human Stain | Yes | No | Faunia Farley | | |
| 2003 | Cold Mountain | Yes | No | Ada Monroe | | |
| 2004 | The Stepford Wives | Yes | No | Joanna Eberhart | | |
| 2004 | Birth | Yes | No | Anna | | |
| 2004 | No. 5 the Film | Yes | No | Herself | Short film | |
| 2005 | The Interpreter | Yes | No | Silvia Broome | | |
| 2005 | Bewitched | Yes | No | Isabel Bigelow / Samantha | | |
| 2006 | Fur | Yes | No | Diane Arbus | | |
| 2006 | Happy Feet | Yes | No | Norma Jean | Voice role | |
| 2006 | The Queen | Yes | No | Herself | Archive footage | |
| 2007 | The Invasion | Yes | No | Dr. Carol Bennell | | |
| 2007 | Margot at the Wedding | Yes | No | Margot | | |
| 2007 | The Golden Compass | Yes | No | Marisa Coulter | | |
| 2008 | Australia | Yes | No | Lady Sarah Ashley | | |
| 2009 | Nine | Yes | No | Claudia Jenssen | | |
| 2010 | Rabbit Hole | Yes | Yes | Becca Corbett | | |
| 2011 | Just Go with It | Yes | No | Devlin Adams | | |
| 2011 | Trespass | Yes | No | Sarah Miller | | |
| 2011 | Monte Carlo | No | Yes | —N/a | | |
| 2012 | The Paperboy | Yes | No | Charlotte Bless | | |
| 2013 | Stoker | Yes | No | Evelyn Stoker | | |
| 2013 | The Railway Man | Yes | No | Patti Lomax | | |
| 2014 | Grace of Monaco | Yes | No | Grace Kelly | | |
| 2014 | Before I Go to Sleep | Yes | No | Christine Lucas | | |
| 2014 | Paddington | Yes | No | Millicent Clyde | | |
| 2015 | Strangerland | Yes | No | Catherine Parker | | |
| 2015 | Queen of the Desert | Yes | No | Gertrude Bell | | |
| 2015 | The Family Fang | Yes | Yes | Annie Fang | | |
| 2015 | Secret in Their Eyes | Yes | No | Claire Sloane | | |
| 2016 | Genius | Yes | No | Aline Bernstein | | |
| 2016 | Lion | Yes | No | Sue Brierley | | |
| 2017 | How to Talk to Girls at Parties | Yes | No | Queen Boadicea | | |
| 2017 | The Killing of a Sacred Deer | Yes | No | Anna Murphy | | |
| 2017 | The Beguiled | Yes | No | Martha Farnsworth | | |
| 2017 | The Guardian Brothers | Yes | No | Luli | Voice in English version | |
| 2017 | The Upside | Yes | No | Yvonne Pendleton | | |
| 2017 | Great Performers: Horror Show | Yes | No | The Possessed | Short film | |
| 2018 | Destroyer | Yes | No | Erin Bell | | |
| 2018 | Boy Erased | Yes | No | Nancy Eamons | | |
| 2018 | Aquaman | Yes | No | Queen Atlanna | | |
| 2019 | The Goldfinch | Yes | No | Samantha Barbour | | |
| 2019 | Bombshell | Yes | No | Gretchen Carlson | | |
| 2020 | The Prom | Yes | No | Angie Dickinson | | |
| 2021 | Being the Ricardos | Yes | No | Lucille Ball | | |
| 2022 | The Northman | Yes | No | Queen Gudrún | | |
| 2023 | Aquaman and the Lost Kingdom | Yes | No | Queen Atlanna | | |
| 2024 | A Family Affair | Yes | No | Brooke Harwood | | |
| 2024 | Babygirl | Yes | No | Romy Mathis | | |
| 2024 | Spellbound | Yes | No | Queen Ellsmere | Voice role | |
| 2025 | Holland | Yes | Yes | Nancy Vandergroot | | |
| 2026 | Practical Magic 2 | Yes | Yes | Gillian Owens | | |
| TBA | The Young People † | Yes | No | TBA | Post-production | |

== Television ==
Key
| † | Denotes television programs that have not yet aired. |

| Year | Title | Credited as | | Role | Notes | Ref. |
| Year | Title | Actor | Executive producer | Role | Notes | Ref. |
|---|---|---|---|---|---|---|
| 1984 | Chase Through the Night | Yes | No | Petra | 5 episodes | |
| 1984 | Skin Deep | Yes | No | Sheena Henderson | Television film | |
| 1984 | Matthew and Son | Yes | No | Bridget Elliot | Television film | |
| 1984 | A Country Practice | Yes | No | Simone Jenkins | 2 episodes | |
| 1985 | Five Mile Creek | Yes | No | Annie | 12 episodes | |
| 1985 | Archer | Yes | No | Catherine | Television film | |
| 1985 | Winners | Yes | No | Carol Trig | Episode: "Room to Move" | |
| 1987 | An Australian in Rome | Yes | No | Jill | Television film | |
| 1987 | Vietnam | Yes | No | Megan Goddard | 5 episodes | |
| 1988 | Nightmaster | Yes | No | Amy Gabriel | Television film | |
| 1989 | Bangkok Hilton | Yes | No | Katrina Stanton | 3 episodes | |
| 1993 | Saturday Night Live | Yes | No | Host | Episode: "Nicole Kidman / Stone Temple Pilots" | |
| 2011 | Sesame Street | Yes | No | Herself | Episode: "Super Maria" | |
| 2012 | Hemingway & Gellhorn | Yes | No | Martha Gellhorn | Television film | |
| 2014 | Hello Ladies: The Movie | Yes | No | Herself | Television film | |
| 2017–2019 | Big Little Lies | Yes | Yes | Celeste Wright | 14 episodes | |
| 2017 | Top of the Lake: China Girl | Yes | No | Julia Edwards | 6 episodes | |
| 2020 | The Undoing | Yes | Yes | Grace Fraser | 6 episodes | |
| 2021–2025 | Nine Perfect Strangers | Yes | Yes | Masha Dmitrichenko | 16 episodes | |
| 2022 | Roar | Yes | Yes | Robin | Episode: "The Woman Who Ate Photographs" | |
| 2023 | Love & Death | No | Yes | —N/a | | |
| 2023–present | Lioness | Yes | Yes | Kaitlyn Meade | 24 episodes | |
| 2023 | Faraway Downs | Yes | No | Lady Sarah Ashley | 6 episodes; extended version of Australia (2008) | |
| 2024 | Expats | Yes | Yes | Margaret Woo | 6 episodes | |
| 2024 | The Perfect Couple | Yes | Yes | Greer Garrison Winbury | 6 episodes | |
| 2025 | The Last Anniversary | No | Yes | —N/a | | |
| 2026–present | Scarpetta | Yes | Yes | Dr. Kay Scarpetta | 8 episodes | |
| 2026–present | Margo's Got Money Troubles | Yes | Yes | Linda "Lace" Sawkins | 4 episodes | |
| TBA | Discretion† | Yes | Yes | Sharon | Upcoming series | |

== Theatre ==
| Year | Title | Role | Playwright | Venue | Ref. |
|---|---|---|---|---|---|
| 1988 | Steel Magnolias | Shelby | Robert Harling | York Theatre, Australia | |
| 1988 | Steel Magnolias | Shelby | Robert Harling | Athenaeum Theatre, Australia | |
| 1998 | The Blue Room | Various characters | David Hare | Donmar Warehouse, London | |
| 1998 | The Blue Room | Various characters | David Hare | Cort Theatre, Broadway | |
| 2015 | Photograph 51 | Rosalind Franklin | Anna Ziegler | Noël Coward Theatre, London | |

== Music videos ==
| Year | Title | Artist | Notes | Ref. |
|---|---|---|---|---|
| 1983 | "Bop Girl" | Pat Wilson | | |
| 1983 | "Where They Belong" | Moving Pictures | | |
| 2001 | "Somethin' Stupid" | Robbie Williams | As featured artist | |
| 2026 | "She's the Best" | Troye Sivan | | |

== See also ==
- List of awards and nominations received by Nicole Kidman
- Nicole Kidman AMC Theatres commercial
