= List of awards and nominations received by Nicole Kidman =

Nicole Kidman awards and nominations
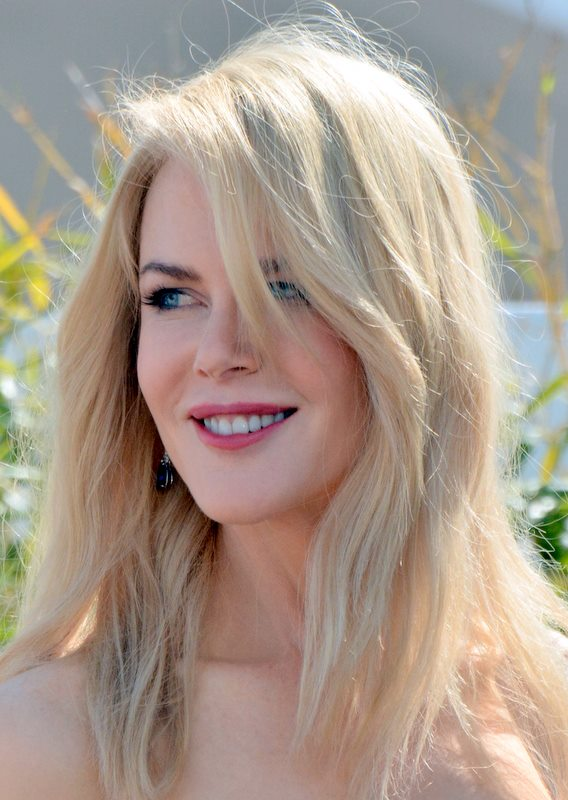
- Kidman at the 2017 Cannes Film Festival
Awards and nominations
Award	Wins	Nominations
Academy Awards	1	5
Actor Awards	1	15
American Film Institute	1	1
British Academy Film Awards	1	4
British Academy Television Awards	0	1
Emmy Awards	2	4
Golden Globes	6	18
Laurence Olivier Awards	0	2
Producers Guild of America Awards	0	3

Totals (Note: Certain award groups do not simply award one winner. They acknowledge several different recipients, have runners-up, and have third place. Since this is a specific recognition and is different from losing an award, runner-up mentions are considered wins in this award tally. For simplification and to avoid errors, each award in this list has been presumed to have had a prior nomination.)
- Wins: 96
- Nominations: 278

Nicole Kidman is an American–born Australian actress and producer who has been honored with numerous accolades including an Academy Award, two Primetime Emmy Awards, a BAFTA Award, six Golden Globe Awards, and an Actor Award. She is the first Australian to win the Academy Award for Best Actress. In 2003, Kidman received a star on the Hollywood Walk of Fame for her contributions to the motion picture industry. In 2024, she received the AFI Life Achievement Award becoming the first-ever Australian to earn this honor.

Kidman won the Academy Award for Best Actress, the BAFTA Award for Best Actress in a Leading Role, and Golden Globe Award for Best Actress in a Motion Picture – Drama for her portrayal of Virginia Woolf in the Stephen Daldry directed drama The Hours (2002). She was Oscar-nominated for her roles as a courtesan Satine in the musical Moulin Rouge! (2001), a grieving mother in the drama Rabbit Hole (2010), an adoptive mother in the drama Lion (2016), and Lucille Ball in the biographical drama Being the Ricardos (2021). She won six Golden Globe Awards including for four wins for her film roles in To Die For (1995), Moulin Rouge! (2001), The Hours (2002), and Being the Ricardos (2021).

For her roles on television, she won two Primetime Emmy Awards for Outstanding Limited Series and Outstanding Lead Actress in a Limited Series or Movie for the HBO series Big Little Lies (2017). The role also earned her the Golden Globe Award for Best Actress – Miniseries or Television Film, and the Screen Actors Guild Award for Outstanding Performance by a Female Actor in a Miniseries or Television Movie. She was Emmy-nominated for playing Martha Gellhorn in the HBO biographical film Hemingway & Gellhorn (2012), and earned Golden Globe and Screen Actors Guild Award nominations for playing psychologist Grace Fraser in the HBO psychological thriller series The Undoing (2021).

On the West End stage, she received Laurence Olivier Award for Best Actress nominations for playing various characters in the David Hare play The Blue Room (1999), and chemist Rosalind Franklin in the Anna Ziegler play Photograph 51 (2016). The role for the later earned her wins for the Evening Standard Theatre Award for Best Actress and the WhatsOnStage Award for Best Actress in a Play.

In addition to her 2003 Academy Award for Best Actress, Kidman has received Best Actress awards from the following critics' associations or award–granting organisations: the Hollywood Foreign Press Association (Golden Globe Award), the Australian Film Institute, London Film Critics' Circle, and Russian Guild of Film Critics. In 2003, Kidman was given the American Cinematheque Award. She also received recognition from the National Association of Theatre Owners in 1992 as the Female Star of Tomorrow, and in 2002 for a Distinguished Decade of Achievement in Film Award. In 2012, she received New York Film Festival Gala Tribute.

Key
†	Indicates non-competitive categories

== Major associations ==
=== Academy Awards ===
Year	Category	Work	Result	Ref.
2002	Best Actress	Moulin Rouge!	Nominated	
2003	Best Actress	The Hours	Won	
2011	Best Actress	Rabbit Hole	Nominated	
2017	Best Supporting Actress	Lion	Nominated	
2022	Best Actress	Being the Ricardos	Nominated	

=== Actor Awards ===
Year	Category	Work	Result	Ref.
2002	Outstanding Cast in a Motion Picture	Moulin Rouge!	Nominated (Note: Shared with the cast.)	
2003	Outstanding Female Actor in a Leading Role	The Hours	Nominated	
2003	Outstanding Cast in a Motion Picture	The Hours	Nominated	
2010	Outstanding Cast in a Motion Picture	Nine	Nominated	
2011	Outstanding Female Actor in a Leading Role	Rabbit Hole	Nominated	
2013	Outstanding Female Actor in a Supporting Role	The Paperboy	Nominated	
2013	Outstanding Female Actor in a Television Movie or Miniseries	Hemingway & Gellhorn	Nominated	
2016	Outstanding Female Actor in a Television Movie or Miniseries	Grace of Monaco	Nominated	
2017	Outstanding Female Actor in a Supporting Role	Lion	Nominated	
2018	Outstanding Female Actor in a Television Movie or Limited Series	Big Little Lies	Won	
2020	Outstanding Ensemble in a Drama Series	Big Little Lies	Nominated	
2020	Outstanding Female Actor in a Supporting Role	Bombshell	Nominated	
2020	Outstanding Cast in a Motion Picture	Bombshell	Nominated	
2021	Outstanding Female Actor in a Television Movie or Limited Series	The Undoing	Nominated	
2022	Outstanding Female Actor in a Leading Role	Being the Ricardos	Nominated	

=== BAFTA Awards ===
Year	Category	Work	Result	Ref.
British Academy Film Awards
1996	Best Actress in a Leading Role	To Die For	Nominated	
2002	Best Actress in a Leading Role	The Others	Nominated	
2003	Best Actress in a Leading Role	The Hours	Won	
2017	Best Actress in a Supporting Role	Lion	Nominated	
British Academy Television Awards
2018	Best International Programme	Big Little Lies	Nominated (Note: As an executive producer, shared with other producers.)	

=== Critics' Choice Awards ===
Year	Category	Work	Result	Ref.
Critics' Choice Movie Awards
1996	Best Actress	To Die For	Won	
2002	Best Actress	Moulin Rouge!	Nominated	
2003	Best Actress	The Hours	Nominated	
2004	Best Actress	Cold Mountain	Nominated	
2011	Best Actress	Rabbit Hole	Nominated	
2016	Best Supporting Actress	Lion	Nominated	
2019	Best Supporting Actress	Boy Erased	Nominated	
2022	Best Actress	Being the Ricardos	Nominated	
Critics' Choice Television Awards
2018	Best Actress in a Movie Made for TV or Limited Series	Big Little Lies	Won	
2020	Best Actress in a Drama Series	Big Little Lies	Nominated	
2025	Best Supporting Actress in a Drama Series	Special Ops: Lioness	Nominated	

=== Emmy Awards ===
Year	Category	Work	Result	Ref.
Primetime Emmy Awards
2012	Outstanding Lead Actress in a Miniseries or a Movie	Hemingway & Gellhorn	Nominated	
2017	Outstanding Limited Series	Big Little Lies	Won	
2017	Outstanding Lead Actress in a Limited Series or Movie	Big Little Lies	Won	
2026	Outstanding Comedy Series	Margo's Got Money Troubles	Nominated	

=== Golden Globe Awards ===
Year	Category	Work	Result	Ref.
1992	Best Supporting Actress in a Motion Picture	Billy Bathgate	Nominated	
1996	Best Actress in a Motion Picture – Comedy or Musical	To Die For	Won	
2002	Best Actress in a Motion Picture – Comedy or Musical	Moulin Rouge!	Won	
2002	Best Actress in a Motion Picture – Drama	The Others	Nominated	
2003	Best Actress in a Motion Picture – Drama	The Hours	Won	
2004	Best Actress in a Motion Picture – Drama	Cold Mountain	Nominated	
2005	Best Actress in a Motion Picture – Drama	Birth	Nominated	
2011	Best Actress in a Motion Picture – Drama	Rabbit Hole	Nominated	
2013	Best Actress in a Miniseries or TV Movie	Hemingway & Gellhorn	Nominated	
2013	Best Supporting Actress in a Motion Picture	The Paperboy	Nominated	
2017	Best Supporting Actress in a Motion Picture	Lion	Nominated	
2018	Best Actress in a Limited Series or TV Movie	Big Little Lies	Won	
2018	Best Television Limited Series or TV Movie	Big Little Lies	Won	
2019	Best Actress in a Motion Picture – Drama	Destroyer	Nominated	
2020	Best Actress in a Television Series – Drama	Big Little Lies	Nominated	
2021	Best Actress in a Limited Series, Anthology Series or TV Movie	The Undoing	Nominated	
2022	Best Actress in a Motion Picture – Drama	Being the Ricardos	Won	
2025	Best Actress in a Motion Picture – Drama	Babygirl	Nominated	

=== Laurence Olivier Awards ===
Year	Category	Work	Result	Ref.
1999	Best Actress	The Blue Room	Nominated	
2016	Best Actress	Photograph 51	Nominated	

== Miscellaneous awards ==
Awards and nominations received by Nicole Kidman
Award	Year (Note: The listed year refers to the date of the ceremony.)	Category	Work	Result	Ref.
AACTA Awards	2017	Best Supporting Actress	Lion	Won	
AACTA Awards	2017	Best Guest or Supporting Actress in a Television Drama	Top of the Lake: China Girl	Won	
AACTA Awards	2018	Best Supporting Actress	Boy Erased	Won	
AACTA Awards	2020	Favourite Global Star of the Decade	—N/a	Nominated	
AACTA Awards	2025	Audience Choice Award for Favourite Actress	—N/a	Nominated	
AACTA Awards	2026	Best Miniseries	The Last Anniversary	Nominated	
AACTA International Awards	2013	Best Lead Actress	The Paperboy	Nominated	
AACTA International Awards	2017	Best Supporting Actress	Lion	Won	
AACTA International Awards	2018	Best Supporting Actress	The Killing of a Sacred Deer	Nominated	
AACTA International Awards	2019	Best Lead Actress	Destroyer	Nominated	
AACTA International Awards	2019	Best Supporting Actress	Boy Erased	Won	
AACTA International Awards	2020	Best Supporting Actress	Bombshell	Nominated	
AACTA International Awards	2021	Best Actress in a Series	The Undoing	Nominated	
AACTA International Awards	2022	Best Actress in a Series	Nine Perfect Strangers	Nominated	
AACTA International Awards	2022	Best Lead Actress	Being the Ricardos	Won	
AACTA International Awards	2025	Best Lead Actress	Babygirl	Won	
AARP Movies for Grownups Awards	2016	Best Supporting Actress	Lion	Nominated	
AARP Movies for Grownups Awards	2019	Best Actress	Destroyer	Nominated	
AARP Movies for Grownups Awards	2019	Best Supporting Actress	Boy Erased	Nominated	
AARP Movies for Grownups Awards	2020	Best Supporting Actress	Bombshell	Nominated	
AARP Movies for Grownups Awards	2022	Best Actress	Being the Ricardos	Won	
AARP Movies for Grownups Awards	2025	Best Actress	Babygirl	Nominated	
Alliance of Women Film Journalists	2007	Actress Most in Need of a New Agent	—N/a	Nominated	
Alliance of Women Film Journalists	2008	Actress Most in Need of a New Agent	—N/a	Nominated	
Alliance of Women Film Journalists	2011	Best Actress	Rabbit Hole	Nominated	
Alliance of Women Film Journalists	2013	Actress Most in Need of a New Agent	The Paperboy	Nominated	
Alliance of Women Film Journalists	2019	Actress Defying Age and Ageism	Destroyer	Nominated	
Alliance of Women Film Journalists	2019	Bravest Performance	Destroyer	Nominated	
Alliance of Women Film Journalists	2019	Outstanding Achievement by a Woman in the Film Industry	Various (Note: "For a banner year of performances in Destroyer, Boy Erased and Aquaman, and for opening opportunity or women in production.")	Nominated	
American Comedy Awards	1996	Funniest Actress in a Motion Picture (Leading Role)	To Die For	Nominated	
Annual Girls On Film Awards	2025	Female Orgasm on Screen Sponsored by Intimacy on Set	Babygirl	Won	
The Astra Awards	2018	Best Actress	Destroyer	Nominated	
The Astra Awards	2022	Best Actress	Being the Ricardos	Nominated	
Australian Film Critics Association	2014	Best Actress	The Railway Man	Won	
Australian Film Critics Association	2016	Best Actress	Strangerland	Nominated	
Australian Film Critics Association	2018	Best Supporting Actress	Lion	Won	
Australian Film Critics Association	2019	Best Supporting Actress	Boy Erased	Won	
Australian Film Institute Awards	1987	Best Actress in a Mini Series	Vietnam	Won	
Australian Film Institute Awards	1989	Best Actress in a Supporting Role	Emerald City	Nominated	
Australian Film Institute Awards	2001	Best Actress in a Leading Role	Moulin Rouge!	Nominated	
Australian Film Institute Awards	2008	AFI International Actor for Best Actress	The Golden Compass	Nominated	
Austin Film Critics Association	2025	Best Actress	Babygirl	Nominated	
Berlin International Film Festival	2003	Silver Bear for Best Actress	The Hours	Won (Note: Shared with Julianne Moore and Meryl Streep for the same film.)	
Blockbuster Entertainment Awards	1996	Favorite Actress – Action/Adventure	Batman Forever	Won	
Blockbuster Entertainment Awards	1998	Favorite Actress – Action/Adventure	The Peacemaker	Nominated	
Blockbuster Entertainment Awards	2000	Favorite Actress – Drama/Romance	Eyes Wide Shut	Won	
Bodil Awards	2004	Best Actress in a Leading Role	Dogville	Nominated	
Boston Society of Film Critics	1995	Best Actress	To Die For	Won	
Cannes Film Festival	2017	70th Anniversary Prize †	—N/a	Won	
Cannes Film Festival	2025	Woman in Motion Award †	—N/a	Won	
Capri Hollywood International Film Festival	2016	Best Supporting Actress	Lion	Won	
Chicago Film Critics Association	2003	Best Actress	The Hours	Nominated	
Chlotrudis Awards	1996	Best Actress	To Die For	Nominated	
Cinema for Peace Foundation	2013	Cinema for Peace †	—N/a	Won	
Dallas–Fort Worth Film Critics Association	2002	Best Actress	Moulin Rouge!	Nominated	
Dallas–Fort Worth Film Critics Association	2003	Best Actress	The Hours	Nominated	
Dallas–Fort Worth Film Critics Association	2004	Best Actress	Cold Mountain	Nominated	
Dallas–Fort Worth Film Critics Association	2010	Best Actress	Rabbit Hole	3rd place	
Dallas–Fort Worth Film Critics Association	2018	Best Actress	Destroyer	5th place	
Dallas–Fort Worth Film Critics Association	2021	Best Actress	Being the Ricardos	5th place	
Dallas–Fort Worth Film Critics Association	2024	Best Actress	Babygirl	5th place	
Denver Film Critics Society	2017	Best Supporting Actress	Lion	Nominated	
Denver Film Critics Society	2022	Best Actress	Being the Ricardos	Nominated	
Detroit Film Critics Society	2010	Best Actress	Rabbit Hole	Nominated	
Detroit Film Critics Society	2021	Best Actress	Being the Ricardos	Nominated	
Dorian Awards	2018	TV Performance of the Year – Actress	Big Little Lies	Won	
Dorian Awards	2019	Wilde Artist of the Year	—N/a	Nominated	
Dorian Awards	2025	Film Performance of the Year	Babygirl	Nominated	
Empire Awards	1996	Best Actress	To Die For	Won	
Empire Awards	2000	Best Actress	Eyes Wide Shut	Nominated	
Empire Awards	2002	Best Actress	Moulin Rouge!	Won	
Empire Awards	2002	Best Actress	The Others	Nominated	
Empire Awards	2004	Best Actress	Cold Mountain	Nominated	
Empire Awards	2018	Best Actress in a TV Series	Big Little Lies	Won	
Fangoria Chainsaw Awards	2002	Best Actress	The Others	Won	
Florida Film Critics Circle	2024	Best Actress	Babygirl	Nominated	
Film Independent Spirit Awards	2011	Best Female Lead	Rabbit Hole	Nominated	
Georgia Film Critics Association	2017	Best Supporting Actress	Lion	Nominated	
Golden Schmoes Awards	2001	Best Actress of the Year	Moulin Rouge!	Won	
Golden Schmoes Awards	2001	Best Actress of the Year	The Others	Runner-up	
Golden Schmoes Awards	2001	Breakthrough Performance of the Year	The Others	Nominated	
Golden Schmoes Awards	2001	Favourite Celebrity of the Year	—N/a	Won	
Golden Schmoes Awards	2002	Best Actress of the Year	The Hours	Runner-up	
Golden Schmoes Awards	2002	Favourite Celebrity of the Year	—N/a	Runner-up	
Golden Raspberry Awards	2006	Worst Screen Combo	Bewitched	Won (Note: With Will Ferrell.)	
Golden Raspberry Awards	2012	Worst Supporting Actress	Just Go with It	Nominated	
Goldene Kamera	2017	Best International Actress †	—N/a	Won	
Gotham Awards	2007	Best Ensemble Performance	Margot at the Wedding	Nominated	
Gotham Awards	2017	Gotham Tribute †	—N/a	Won	
Gotham Awards	2024	Outstanding Lead Performance	Babygirl	Nominated	
Goya Awards	2003	Best Actress	The Others	Nominated	
Greater Western New York Film Critics Association	2018	Supporting Actress	Boy Erased	Nominated	
Harper's Bazaar Women of the Year Awards	2015	Theatre Icon †	—N/a	Won	
Hollywood Film Awards	2016	Hollywood Supporting Actress Award	Lion	Won	
Houston Film Critics Society	2010	Best Actress	Rabbit Hole	Nominated	
Huading Awards	2013	Best Global Film Actress †	—N/a	Won	
IFTA Film & Drama Awards	2018	Best International Actress	The Killing of a Sacred Deer	Nominated	
International Cinephile Society	2013	Supporting Actress	The Paperboy	Nominated	
International Cinephile Society	2017	Supporting Actress	Lion	Nominated	
International Cinephile Society	2025	Actress	Babygirl	Nominated	
Jupiter Awards	2004	Best International Actress	Cold Mountain	Won	
Jupiter Awards	2020	Best International Actress	Boy Erased	Won	
Jupiter Awards	2026	Best International Actress	Babygirl	Nominated	
Kansas City Film Critics Circle	2001	Best Actress	The Others	Won	
Logie Awards	1988	Most Popular Actress in a Miniseries or Telemovie	Vietnam	Won	
Logie Awards	1990	Most Popular Actress in a Miniseries or Telemovie	Bangkok Hilton	Won	
Logie Awards	1990	Most Outstanding Actress	Bangkok Hilton	Won	
London Film Critics' Circle	1996	Actress of the Year	To Die For	Won	
London Film Critics' Circle	2002	Actress of the Year	Moulin Rouge! and The Others	Won	
London Film Critics' Circle	2004	Actress of the Year	Cold Mountain	Nominated	
London Film Critics' Circle	2005	Actress of the Year	Birth	Nominated	
London Film Critics' Circle	2025	Actress of the Year	Babygirl	Nominated	
Michigan Movie Critics Guild	2024	Best Actress	Babygirl	Nominated	
MTV Movie & TV Awards	1993	Best On-Screen Duo	Far and Away	Nominated (Note: With Tom Cruise.)	
MTV Movie & TV Awards	1996	Most Desirable Female	Batman Forever	Nominated	
MTV Movie & TV Awards	2002	Best Female Performance	Moulin Rouge!	Won	
MTV Movie & TV Awards	2002	Best Musical Sequence	Moulin Rouge!	Nominated	
MTV Movie & TV Awards	2002	Best Musical Sequence	Moulin Rouge!	Won (Note: With Ewan McGregor.)	
MTV Movie & TV Awards	2002	Best Kiss	Moulin Rouge!	Nominated	
National Board of Review	2024	Best Actress	Babygirl	Won	
Nevada Film Critics Society	2018	Best Actress	Destroyer	Won (Note: Tied with Toni Collette for Hereditary.)	
New York Film Critics Online	2024	Best Actress	Babygirl	Nominated	
Nickelodeon Australian Kids' Choice Awards	2006	Fave Aussie	—N/a	Nominated	
Nickelodeon Australian Kids' Choice Awards	2007	Fave Movie Star	—N/a	Nominated	
Nickelodeon Kids' Choice Awards	1996	Favorite Movie Actress	Batman Forever	Nominated	
Noir in Festival	2018	Special Mention †	Destroyer	Won	
North Carolina Film Critics Association	2017	Best Supporting Actress	Lion	Nominated	
North Carolina Film Critics Association	2019	Best Supporting Actress	Boy Erased	Nominated	
North Dakota Film Society	2025	Best Actress	Babygirl	Nominated	
Online Film Critics Society	2002	Best Actress	The Others	Nominated	
Online Film Critics Society	2011	Best Actress	Rabbit Hole	Nominated	
Palm Springs International Film Festival	2005	Chairman's award †	—N/a	Won	
Palm Springs International Film Festival	2017	International Star Award †	Lion	Won	
Palm Springs International Film Festival	2022	Career Achievement Award †	Being the Ricardos	Won	
Palm Springs International Film Festival	2025	International Star Award †	Babygirl	Won	
People's Choice Awards	2005	Favorite Motion Picture Actress	—N/a	Nominated	
People's Choice Awards	2006	Favorite Motion Picture Actress	—N/a	Nominated	
People's Choice Awards	2006	Nice 'n Easy Fans Favorite Hair	—N/a	Nominated	
Portland Critics Association	2025	Best Lead Performance (Female)	Babygirl	Nominated	
Phoenix Critics Circle	2021	Best Actress	Being the Ricardos	Nominated	
Phoenix Critics Circle	2024	Best Actress	Babygirl	Nominated	
Producers Guild of America Awards	2018	Outstanding Producer of Episodic Television, Drama	Big Little Lies	Nominated	
Producers Guild of America Awards	2020	Outstanding Producer of Episodic Television, Drama	Big Little Lies	Nominated	
Producers Guild of America Awards	2021	Outstanding Producer of Limited Series Television	The Undoing	Nominated	
Russian Guild of Film Critics	2002	Best Actress in a Foreign Film	The Others	Nominated	
Russian Guild of Film Critics	2003	Best Actress in a Foreign Film	Dogville	Won	
Russian National Movie Awards	2008	Best Foreign Actress	The Invasion and The Golden Compass	Nominated	
Russian National Movie Awards	2014	Best Foreign Actress of the Decade	—N/a	Nominated	
San Diego Film Critics Society	2016	Best Supporting Actress	Lion	Nominated	
San Diego Film Critics Society	2018	Best Supporting Actress	Boy Erased	Won	
Satellite Awards	2000	Best Actress – Motion Picture Drama	Eyes Wide Shut	Nominated	
Satellite Awards	2002	Best Actress – Motion Picture Drama	The Others	Nominated	
Satellite Awards	2002	Best Actress – Motion Picture Comedy or Musical	Moulin Rouge!	Won	
Satellite Awards	2003	Best Actress – Motion Picture Drama	The Hours	Nominated	
Satellite Awards	2007	Best Actress – Motion Picture Comedy or Musical	Margot at the Wedding	Nominated	
Satellite Awards	2010	Best Actress – Motion Picture Drama	Rabbit Hole	Nominated	
Satellite Awards	2012	Best Actress – Miniseries or Television Film	Hemingway & Gellhorn	Nominated	
Satellite Awards	2017	Best Actress in a Supporting Role	Lion	Nominated	
Satellite Awards	2018	Best Actress – Miniseries or Television Film	Big Little Lies	Won	
Satellite Awards	2019 (Note: First ceremony in 2019.)	Best Actress – Motion Picture Drama	Destroyer	Nominated	
Satellite Awards	2019	Best Actress in a Supporting Role	Boy Erased	Nominated	
Satellite Awards	2019 (Note: Second ceremony in 2019.)	Best Actress in a Supporting Role	Bombshell	Nominated	
Satellite Awards	2021	Best Actress in a Supporting Role	The Prom	Nominated	
Satellite Awards	2021	Best Actress – Miniseries or Television Film	The Undoing	Nominated	
Satellite Awards	2022	Best Actress – Motion Picture Drama	Being the Ricardos	Nominated	
Satellite Awards	2022	Best Actress – Television Series Drama/Genre	Nine Perfect Strangers	Nominated	
Satellite Awards	2025	Best Actress – Motion Picture Drama	Babygirl	Nominated	
Satellite Awards	2025	Best Actress – Miniseries, Limited Series or Television Film	Expats	Nominated	
Saturn Awards	1991	Best Actress	Dead Calm	Nominated	
Saturn Awards	1996	Best Actress	To Die For	Nominated	
Saturn Awards	2002	Best Actress	The Others	Won	
Saturn Awards	2005	Best Actress	Birth	Nominated	
Saturn Awards	2013	Best Supporting Actress	The Paperboy	Nominated	
Saturn Awards	2014	Best Supporting Actress	Stoker	Nominated	
Saturn Awards	2019	Best Actress	Destroyer	Nominated	
Seattle International Film Festival	1995	Best Actress	To Die For	Won	
ShoWest	1992	Female Star of Tomorrow Award †	—N/a	Won	
ShoWest	2002	Distinguished Decade of Achievement in Film Award †	—N/a	Won	
Southeastern Film Critics Association	1995	Best Actress	To Die For	Won	
Southeastern Film Critics Association	2002	Best Actress	The Hours	Runner-up	
St. Louis Film Critics Association	2010	Best Actress	Rabbit Hole	Nominated	
St. Louis Film Critics Association	2022	Best Actress	Being the Ricardos	Nominated	
Standard Theatre Awards	2015	Best Actress	Photograph 51	Won	
Stinkers Bad Movie Awards	2005	Worst Actress	Bewitched	Nominated	
Stinkers Bad Movie Awards	2005	Worst On-Screen Couple	Bewitched	Nominated	
Stinkers Bad Movie Awards	2005	Most Annoying Fake Accent (Female)	Bewitched	Nominated	
TCA Awards	2017	Individual Achievement in Drama	Big Little Lies	Nominated	
Teen Choice Awards	2009	Choice Movie Actress: Drama	Australia	Nominated	
Theatre World Awards	1999	Theatre World Award	The Blue Room	Won	
Vancouver Film Critics Circle	2003	Best Actress	The Hours	Nominated	
Venice Film Festival	2024	Volpi Cup for Best Actress	Babygirl	Won	
Washington D.C. Area Film Critics Association	2010	Best Actress	Rabbit Hole	Nominated	
Washington D.C. Area Film Critics Association	2018	Best Supporting Actress	Boy Erased	Nominated	
Washington D.C. Area Film Critics Association	2021	Best Actress	Being the Ricardos	Nominated	
WhatsOnStage Awards	2016	Best Actress in a Play	Photograph 51	Won	
Women Film Critics Circle	2006	Best Animated Females	Happy Feet	Won (Note: With Brittany Murphy.)	
Women Film Critics Circle	2018	Courage in Acting	Destroyer	Won	
Women Film Critics Circle	2021	Best Actress	Being the Ricardos	Runner-up	
Women Film Critics Circle	2021	Best Screen Couple	Being the Ricardos	Runner-up (Note: With Javier Bardem.)	
Women Film Critics Circle	2024	Best Actress	Babygirl	Nominated	
Women in Film Honors	2015	Crystal Award †	—N/a	Won	

== Honorary awards ==
Organizations	Year	Award	Result	Ref.
American Cinematheque Award	2003	American Cinematheque Award †	Honored	
American Film Institute	2024	AFI Life Achievement Award †	Honored	
César Awards	2027	Honorary César †	Honored	
Elle Style Awards	2004	Woman of the Year †	Honored	
Elle Women in Hollywood	2008	Elle Women in Hollywood Award †	Honored	
Elle Women in Hollywood	2019	Elle Women in Hollywood Award †	Honored	
GQ Men of the Year Awards	2019	Actress of the Year †	Honored	
GQ Men of the Year Awards	2024	Honoree †	Honored	
Hollywood Chamber of Commerce	2003	Hollywood Walk of Fame †	Honored	
The Hollywood Reporter Women in Entertainment	2024	Sherry Lansing Leadership Award †	Honored	
Hollywood Film Awards	2018	Hollywood Career Achievement Award †	Honored	
Los Cabos International Film Festival	2017	Lifetime Achievement Award †	Honored	
Mill Valley Film Festival	2016	Festival Tribute †	Honored	
New York Film Festival	2012	Gala Tribute †	Honored	
Santa Barbara International Film Festival	2011	Cinema Vanguard Award †	Honored	
Santa Barbara International Film Festival	2022	Maltin Modern Master Award †	Honored	
Shanghai International Film Festival	2014	Outstanding Contribution to World Cinema †	Honored	
Taormina Film Fest	2019	Taormina Arte Award †	Honored	

== See also ==
- Nicole Kidman on screen and stage
- Nicole Kidman discography
- List of Australian Academy Award winners and nominees
- List of actors with Academy Award nominations
- List of actors with more than one Academy Award nomination in the acting categories
