= Mark Spain =

Australian actor

Mark Spain (born 1971) is an Australian former child actor. His performance in the TV series The Restless Years won him a Logie.

== Select Credits ==
- My Brilliant Career (1979)
- Harlequin (1980)
- The Young Doctors
- The Restless Years (1980)) (TV series)
- Secret Valley (1980)
- Ginger Meggs (1982)
- Bush Christmas (1983)
- A Country Practice (1984–85) (TV series)
- Mad Max Beyond Thunderdome (1985)
