= Antonia Kidman =

Australian journalist

- Born: 14 July 1970 (age 56); Melbourne, Victoria, Australia
- Occupations: Journalist; television presenter
- Spouses: Angus Hawley (m. 1996; div. 2007) Craig Marran (m. 2010)
- Children: 6
- Parent: Antony Kidman
- Relatives: Nicole Kidman (sister)

Antonia Kidman (born 14 July 1970) is an Australian journalist and TV presenter, and the younger sister of actress Nicole Kidman.

== Early life ==
Born in Melbourne, Victoria, Australia, in 1970, Kidman is the younger daughter of Antony Kidman, a clinical psychologist. She attended Monte Sant' Angelo Mercy College in North Sydney.

== Career ==
Kidman began her career in journalism as a researcher with the Nine Network's Today program, and later worked as a news reporter for the Newcastle based television network, NBN Television. She has had a long professional involvement with Foxtel, and in 2002 presented her own series, The Little Things, an instructional series about raising children on the W. Channel. In 2003, she released a yoga video called Antonia Fitness Yoga: The Power And Style of Ashtanga. This was followed by the series The Bigger Things in 2006.

In 2008, Kidman was awarded Favourite Female Personality at the ASTRA Awards for the second time. In 2010, she became the "ambassador" for a Chinese travel agency, Book China Online.

Kidman has co-written two books about parenting: Feeding Fussy Kids (2009) and The Simple Things: Creating an Organised Home, a Happy Family and A Life Worth Living (2012).

== Personal life ==
Kidman married Angus Hawley in February 1996. Their wedding took place in the Monte Sant' Angelo Mercy College chapel with her sister Nicole Kidman and her then-husband Tom Cruise present. Together, Kidman and Hawley have two daughters and two sons. In May 2007, Hawley and Kidman's 11-year marriage ended. Kidman remained with the children in the family home in Greenwich, Sydney, and the couple continued to share the responsibility of parenting their children. Hawley died of a heart attack in April 2015, aged 46.

In April 2010, Kidman married Craig Marran, a Singapore-based businessman. Kidman and Marran have two sons together.

== Filmography ==
- Joe Wilson (1988), actress (two episodes)
- Premiere (1999), host
- The Cover (2001), reporter
- The Little Things (2002), host and producer
- Cleo Bachelor 2002: Real Men Revealed (2002), host
- In Entertainment (2003), host and producer
- Pink Ribbon TV (2004–2005), host
- The Bigger Things (2006), host and producer
- From Here to Maternity (2006), host and producer
