= Bush Christmas =

- DVD cover
- Directed by: Henri Safran
- Written by: Ted Roberts
- Starring: John Ewart; John Howard; Nicole Kidman; Mark Spain; James Wingrove
- Cinematography: Malcolm Richards
- Edited by: Ron Williams
- Music by: The Bushwackers
- Distributed by: Barron Films; Umbrella Entertainment
- Release date: 22 December 1983
- Running time: 91 minutes
- Country: Australia
- Language: English
- Budget: A$950,000
- Box office: $122,035 (Australia)

Bush Christmas (also known as Prince and the Great Race) is a 1983 Australian Christmas drama film and a remake of the 1947 film of the same name. The film marked actress Nicole Kidman's first feature film role. It was filmed on location on the Lamington Plateau, Queensland. It is also notable for music by the Bushwackers.

== Plot ==
In rural Queensland, the Thompson family, struggling to keep its farm from foreclosure, hopes their horse, Prince, will win the New Year's Cup so that they can use the winnings to pay off the debt. However, two struggling lowlifes, Bill and Sly (John Ewart and John Howard), find out about the horse and steal it, escaping into the nearby mountain range.

With the father off droving cattle and the thieves having sabotaged all forms of transportation and communication before escaping, the Thompson children Helen (Nicole Kidman) and John (Mark Spain), and their English cousin Michael (James Wingrove), saddle up their own horses and go after the crooks on their own, with Manalpuy, a local Aboriginal who works on the farm, assisting them.

== Production ==
At one stage Howard Rubie was announced as director and he was involved in casting. However, for a time it seemed the film might not go ahead so Rubie accepted a chance to direct The Settlement instead.

The movie was shot in Beaudesert and Rathdowney, Queensland. Funding came in part from the Australian Film Commission, the Film and TV Institute (WA), and Queensland Film Corporation.

== Release ==
=== Box office ===
Bush Christmas grossed $122,035 at the box office in Australia, which is equivalent to $322,172 in 2009 dollars.

=== Home media ===
Bush Christmas was released on DVD by Umbrella Entertainment in December 2012. The DVD is compatible with all region codes and includes special features such as the theatrical trailer, press kit stills and the script.

== See also ==
- List of Christmas films
