= Nicole Kidman discography =

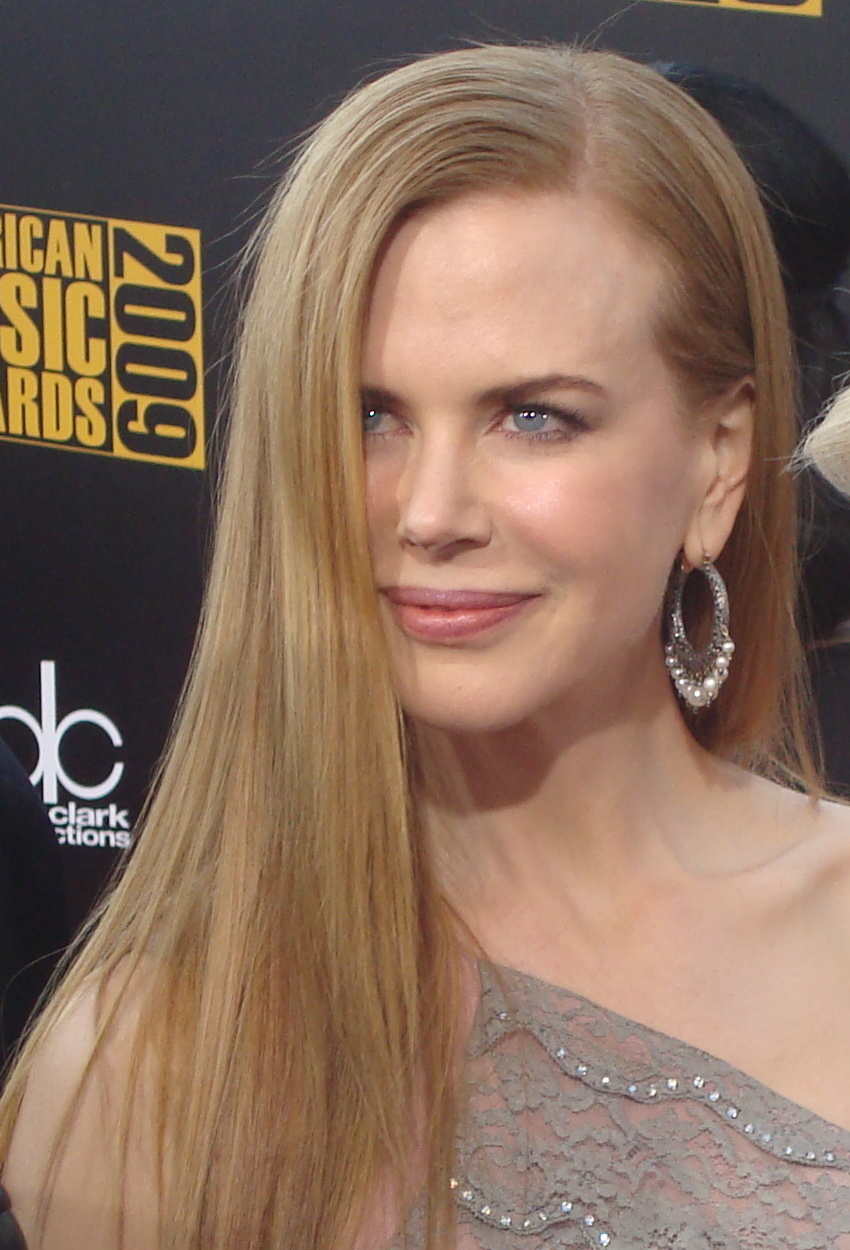
- Kidman at the 2009 American Music Awards
- Singles: 4
- Music videos: 4
- Other appearances: 10
- Unreleased tracks: 2
- Spoken-word albums: 1

The discography of Australian and American actress Nicole Kidman consists of one spoken word album, one extended play, four singles, and a number of unreleased tracks and other appearances.

Kidman, who is primarily known for her acting career, entered the music industry in the early 2000s after recording a number of tracks for the soundtrack album to Baz Luhrmann's 2001 motion picture Moulin Rouge! in which she starred. Her duet with Ewan McGregor entitled "Come What May" was released as her debut and the second single of the OST through Interscope on 24 September 2001. The composition became the eighth highest selling single by an Australian artist for that year, being certified Gold by Australian Recording Industry Association, while reaching on the UK Singles Chart at number twenty-seven. In addition to, the song received a nomination at the 59th Golden Globe Awards as the Best Original Song and has been listed as the eighty-fifth within AFI's 100 Years...100 Songs by American Film Institute.

"Somethin' Stupid", a cover version of the Frank and Nancy Sinatra song followed soon. The track recorded as her common duet with English singer-songwriter Robbie Williams was issued on 14 December 2001 by Chrysalis as the lead of his fourth studio album Swing When You're Winning. Kidman's second single topped the official music charts in Italy, New Zealand, Portugal and the UK, as well as scored top ten placings all over Europe, including Australia, Austria, Belgium, Denmark, Germany, Netherlands, Norway and Switzerland. Apart from being certified either Gold in a number of countries, it was classified as the eleventh best selling single of 2002 in Italy, thirtieth in the UK, the fifty-ninth in Australia, and the ninety-third in France, respectively. On 5 April 2002, Kidman released, through Interscope, her third single, a cover of Randy Crawford's "One Day I'll Fly Away". A Tony Philips remix of the track was promoted as the pilot single of a follow-up to the original soundtrack of the same name, Moulin Rouge! Vol. 2. After that, in 2006, she contributed with her vocal for the OST of Happy Feet on a rendition of Prince's "Kiss". While in 2009, she was featured on the Nine soundtrack ("Unusual Way").

Most recently, her name has been credited on a track called "What's the Procedure", issued on 14 March 2013 on the compilation I Know Why They Call It Pop: Volume 2 by Rok Lok Records. Among others, Kidman also narrated an audiobook in 2012.

== Albums ==
=== Spoken word albums ===
Year	Audiobook	Notes
2012	To the Lighthouse	A novel by Virginia Woolf, chosen by Time magazine as one of the one hundred best English-language novels from 1923 to present. Split into three parts, released by Audible.com on 13 June 2012. Narrated by Kidman herself.

== Singles ==
Year	Single	Top chart positions										Certifications	Album
Year	Single	AUS	AUT	FRA	GER	ITA	NLD	NZ	POR	SWI	UK	Certifications	Album
2001	"Come What May" (with Ewan McGregor)	10	—	—	95	50	65	—	—	97	27	AUS: Gold; UK: Silver	Moulin Rouge! (OST)
2001	"Somethin' Stupid" (with Robbie Williams)	8	2	14	2	1	5	1	1	3	1	AUS: Gold; AUT: Gold; FRA: Gold; GER: Gold; NZ: Gold; SWI: Gold; UK: Gold	Swing When; You're Winning
2002	"One Day I'll Fly Away"	—	—	—	—	—	—	—	—	—	—		Moulin Rouge! Vol. 2 (OST)
2022	"Say Something" (with Luke Evans)	—	—	—	—	—	—	—	—	—	—		A Song for You
"—" denotes a single that did not chart or was not released in that region.

=== Other appearances ===
Year	Song	Notes
2001	"Sparkling Diamonds"^{†}	Additional tracks recorded for the soundtrack of the Baz Luhrmann's 2001 film Moulin Rouge!. The album was released on 8 May 2001 through Interscope. "Sparkling Diamonds" and "Elephant Love Medley" featuring Kidman were also issued in Australia as B-side of the single "Lady Marmalade" by Christina Aguilera, Lil' Kim, Mýa, and Pink.
2001	"Elephant Love Medley"^{†}	Additional tracks recorded for the soundtrack of the Baz Luhrmann's 2001 film Moulin Rouge!. The album was released on 8 May 2001 through Interscope. "Sparkling Diamonds" and "Elephant Love Medley" featuring Kidman were also issued in Australia as B-side of the single "Lady Marmalade" by Christina Aguilera, Lil' Kim, Mýa, and Pink.
2001	"Hindi Sad Diamonds"^{†}	Additional tracks recorded for the soundtrack of the Baz Luhrmann's 2001 film Moulin Rouge!. The album was released on 8 May 2001 through Interscope. "Sparkling Diamonds" and "Elephant Love Medley" featuring Kidman were also issued in Australia as B-side of the single "Lady Marmalade" by Christina Aguilera, Lil' Kim, Mýa, and Pink.
2002	"The Pitch (Spectacular Spectacular)^{†}	Previously unreleased musical compositions performed by Kidman were later available on the Moulin Rouge! Vol. 2, issued on 26 February 2002 via Interscope.
2002	"The Show Must Go On"^{†}	Previously unreleased musical compositions performed by Kidman were later available on the Moulin Rouge! Vol. 2, issued on 26 February 2002 via Interscope.
2006	"Kiss/Heartbreak Hotel" (with Hugh Jackman)	A work produced by John Powell for OST Happy Feet issued by Warner Sunset/Atlantic on 31 October 2006.
2009	"Unusual Way"	Appears on OST Nine issued by Geffen on 22 December 2009.
2020	"Dream a Little Dream"	Appears on the soundtrack to the miniseries The Undoing issued by WaterTower Music on 30 October 2020.
2020	"Changing Lives (Reprise)" (with Meryl Streep, James Corden, and Andrew Rannells)	Appears on the soundtrack to the film The Prom issued by Maisie Music on 4 December 2020.
2020	"It's Not About Me"^{†}	Appears on the soundtrack to the film The Prom issued by Maisie Music on 4 December 2020.
2020	"Zazz" (with Jo Ellen Pellman)	Appears on the soundtrack to the film The Prom issued by Maisie Music on 4 December 2020.
2020	"It's Time to Dance"^{†}	Appears on the soundtrack to the film The Prom issued by Maisie Music on 4 December 2020.
2020	"Wear Your Crown" (with Meryl Streep, Ariana DeBose, Jo Ellen Pellman, and Kerry Washington)	Appears on the soundtrack to the film The Prom issued by Maisie Music on 4 December 2020.
^{†} denotes a song recorded with various artists.

=== Unreleased tracks ===
Year	Song	Notes
1999	"Tie Me Kangaroo Down, Sport"	Performed for "The Best of Mike Myers" special of the Saturday Night Live series, aired on 19 June 1999.
2001	"I Only Have Eyes for You"	A cappella version of the song performed by Kidman for The Others.

== Music videos ==
Year	Song
1983	"Bop Girl" (actress only in Pat Wilson video)
2001	"Come What May"
2001	"Somethin' Stupid"
2002	"One Day I'll Fly Away" (remix version)
2026	"She's the Best"

== See also ==
- AFI's 100 Years...100 Songs
- List of performers on Top of the Pops
- Golden Globe Award for Best Original Song
