= Antony Kidman =

Australian academic (1938–2014)

Antony Kidman AM
- Born: Antony David Kidman; 10 December 1938; Randwick, New South Wales, Australia
- Died: 12 September 2014 (aged 75); Singapore
- Education: University of Sydney (BSc); University of New South Wales (MSc); University of Hawaiʻi at Mānoa (PhD)
- Occupations: Psychologist, biochemist, writer
- Years active: 1960s–2014
- Spouse: Janelle Glenny (m. 1963)
- Children: Nicole Kidman; Antonia Kidman

Antony David Kidman AM (10 December 1938 – 12 September 2014) was an Australian psychologist and academic. He was the father of actress Nicole Kidman and journalist Antonia Kidman.

== Early life and education ==
Kidman was born in Randwick and grew up in North Sydney, the oldest of four children, to Margaret Emily Mary (née Callachor) and Arthur David Kidman. He was of Scottish descent.

Kidman attended St Aloysius' College and then completed a Bachelor of Science at the University of Sydney and a Master of Science at the University of New South Wales. He accepted an American Cancer Society Scholarship and undertook a PhD in biochemistry at the University of Hawaii at Manoa.

== Career ==
In the late 1960s, Kidman moved to Washington, D.C., to work at the National Institute of Mental Health at St. Elizabeth Psychiatric Hospital. He returned to Australia in the early 1970s to take up a position as a lecturer in biochemistry at Monash University. He moved to the University of Technology Sydney in 1972 and worked there until his death.

In 1977, Kidman established the Foundation for Life Sciences, a non-profit organisation focused on youth mental illness. It was renamed the Antony Kidman Foundation after his death.

After his wife was diagnosed with breast cancer in the 1980s, Kidman trained in cognitive behavioural therapy and became a clinical psychologist. In 1985, he established the Health Psychology Unit at the University of Technology, from where he conducted research into the biological and psychological aspects of cancer. He wrote over 150 journal articles and nine books.

== Personal life ==
Kidman married Janelle Glenny, then a student nurse, in 1963. They had two daughters: Academy Award-winning actress Nicole Kidman (born 1967) and journalist and television presenter Antonia Kidman (born 1970).

== Death ==
Kidman died from a heart attack on 12 September 2014 in Singapore, aged 75.

== Awards and honours ==
In 2005, Kidman was made a Member of the Order of Australia for his contribution to clinical psychology.

== Selected bibliography ==
=== Books ===
- A. D. Kidman, How to Change Your Life: Tactics for Moving from Thought to Action (London: Kogan Page, 1996)
- A. D. Kidman, Stress, Coping and Social Support in the Age of Anxiety (Sydney: Foundation for Life Sciences, 2005)
- A. D. Kidman, Schizophrenia: A Guide for Families (Sydney: Biochemical and General Services, 2007)
- A. D. Kidman, Staying Sane in the Fast Lane: A Guide to Emotional Health (Epping: Delphian Books, 2011)

=== Journal articles ===
- Kathryn I. Cocker, David R. Bell and Antony D. Kidman, "Cognitive behaviour therapy with advanced breast cancer patients: A brief report of a pilot study" 3 (3) Psycho-Oncoloy (1994): 233–237
- Sarah Edelman and Antony D. Kidman, "Mind and Cancer: Is There a Relationship?— A Review of Evidence" 32 (2) Australian Psychologist (1997): 79–85
- Sarah Edelman, David R. Bell and Antony D. Kidman, "A group cognitive behaviour therapy programme with metastatic breast cancer patients" 8 (4) Psycho-Oncology (1999): 295–305
- Sarah Edelman, Jim Lemon, David R. Bell and Antony D. Kidman, "Effects of group CBT on the survival time of patients with metastatic breast cancer" 8 (6) Psycho-Oncology (1999): 474–481
- Shane Pascoe, Sarah Edelman and Antony D. Kidman, "Prevalence of psychological distress and use of support services by cancer patients at Sydney hospitals" 34 (5) Australian and New Zealand Journal of Psychiatry (2000): 785–791
