= 2007 Academy Awards =

2007 Academy Awards may refer to:

- 79th Academy Awards, the 2007 ceremony honoring the best in film for 2006
- 80th Academy Awards, the 2008 ceremony honoring the best in film for 2007
