= The Blue Room (play) =

1998 play written by David Hare

The Blue Room is a 1998 play by David Hare, adapted from the 1897 play Der Reigen written by Arthur Schnitzler (1862–1931), and more usually known by the French translation La Ronde.

== Schnitzler's play ==
Schnitzler completed the play in 1900, but did not intend it to be performed, even calling the series of scenes 'unprintable', he intended them to be read by friends. The play was too sexually explicit to be performed at the time. Subsequently, it was read and then performed in private. Its first public performance in 1921, under the now accepted title Reigen, was closed down by the Vienna police – Schnitzler was prosecuted for obscenity.

Reigen was meant as a dramatic exposé of the decadence of the Austrian society. Schnitzler, being a doctor approached the decadence of society from a medical point of view, studying the journey of syphilis through all classes of society. The title Reigen would be best translated as 'round-dance' or 'roundelay'. This refers to the daisy chain of sexual encounters, which also determines the format of the play. It is divided into ten scenes and each holds two characters (always male and female) and their sexual encounter. The following scene contains one character from the previous scene and a new one. A has sex with B, B has sex with C, and so on; until in the tenth scene the circle closes with J having sex with A.

== Hare's adaptation ==
Hare's adaptation, called The Blue Room, transfers the action from Vienna to 'one of the great cities of the world, in the present day'. The characters change accordingly, the soldier becomes a cab driver, the parlour maid becomes an au pair, etc...

Hare's major difference from the original piece is the idea of performing it as a two-person show. Hare states that he was not the first person to do so. In 1981, when the theatrical rights fell temporarily out of copyright, several stage versions were crafted and performed. Otherwise, Hare's adaptation is not far from the original.

Syphilis or any other sexually transmitted disease is never explicitly mentioned in either Schnitzler's original or Hare's adaptation. Scene VI contains the only reference to this when the politician is concerned about 'hygiene' having just slept with the model.

Sam Mendes had asked Hare to adapt Schnitzler's Reigen. The 1950 movie La Ronde by Max Ophüls was also based on Reigen and has influenced many stage adaptations, including The Blue Room.

=== The characters ===
- The Girl (Irene) - Scene I & X
- The Cab Driver (Fred) - Scene I & II
- The Au Pair (Marie) - Scene II & III
- The Student (Anton) - Scene III & IV
- The Married Woman (Emma) - Scene IV & V
- The Politician (Charles) - Scene V & VI
- The Model (Kelly) - Scene VI & VII
- The Playwright (Robert) - Scene VII & VIII
- The Actress - Scene VIII & IX
- The Aristocrat (Malcolm) - Scene IX & X

=== Performances ===
Hare's adaptation was first performed at the Donmar Warehouse, London, on 10 September 1998 with Nicole Kidman and Iain Glen in lead roles. It was directed by Sam Mendes, designed by Mark Thompson, and lit by Hugh Vanstone, with music by Paddy Cunneen. London critic Charles Spencer's review for the Daily Telegraph concluded with the now iconic phrase, "It's pure theatrical Viagra." The production was a commercial success and on 13 December of that year moved to the Cort Theatre on Broadway, New York (with the same cast), but received mixed reviews. Kidman's brief nude appearance, a short flash of her buttocks on a semi-dark stage, caused a hullabaloo and was attributed to brisk ticket sales. Glen's full frontal nudity while cartwheeling attracted far less attention. Several reviewers commented on the best seats to view Kidman's backside.

Hare's play was also performed to critical acclaim in Australia in 2002 with Sigrid Thornton and Marcus Graham in the two lead roles, and directed by Simon Phillips. The Sydney performances took place at the Theatre Royal after a run in Melbourne. The nude scenes and Thornton's "sexy" body were also noted.

The independent film Cubes was structurally inspired by The Blue Room. Screenwriter Mark Zdancewicz transplanted the play's daisy chain structure into the modern office environment. The film, directed by Jason Sherry, follows a series of rotating cubicle partners over the course of a year.
