= Emerald City (film) =

- Theatrical release poster
- Directed by: Michael Jenkins
- Screenplay by: David Williamson
- Based on: Emerald City by David Williamson
- Produced by: Joan Long
- Starring: John Hargreaves; Robyn Nevin; Chris Haywood; Nicole Kidman; Ruth Cracknell
- Cinematography: Paul Murphy
- Edited by: Neil Thumpston
- Music by: Chris Neal
- Production companies: Limelight Productions; New South Wales Film Corporation
- Distributed by: Greater Union Film Distributors
- Release date: 9 December 1988 (Australia)
- Running time: 93 minutes
- Country: Australia
- Language: English
- Budget: A$2.8 million
- Box office: A$192,831

Emerald City is a 1988 Australian comedy-drama film directed by Michael Jenkins, based on the 1987 play of the same name by David Williamson. Much of the play's dialogue is retained though discussion of off-stage characters is usually replaced with their appearance, and a more conventionally cinematic level and speed of dialogue is maintained. Also, the younger daughter Hannah is omitted.

== Plot ==
Colin, a principled screenwriter of some success, and his wife Kate, the editor for a publishing house, relocate from the warmer Melbourne to the more ruthless Sydney and soon become lured by the bright lights of the big city. Colin meets Mike, a hack but resourceful screenwriter with commercial ambitions, and strikes a partnership with him, while instantly falling for his attractive girlfriend Helen. Meanwhile, Kate starts working on a socially important book but soon begins to lose sight of her ideals in this new world of hustlers and cynics.

== Cast ==
- John Hargreaves as Colin Rogers
- Robyn Nevin as Kate
- Chris Haywood as Mike
- Nicole Kidman as Helen
- Ruth Cracknell as Elaine
- Dennis Miller as Malcolm Bennett
- Ella Scott as Penny
- Haydon Samuels as Sam
- Nicholas Hammond as Ian
- Michelle Torres as Kath

== Production ==
The film rights to the play were bought by Joan Long, whose first choice to direct was Bruce Beresford. However, he had just filmed an adaptation of the play Crimes of the Heart and did not want to do another play adaptation, so Michael Jenkins was hired instead. According to some accounts, the original draft of the script pared down the dialogue but John Hargreaves and Robyn Nevin insisted it be put back during rehearsals. Michael Jenkins decided to go along with the actors but had them speak the dialogue especially fast. Jenkins:

We sat down with the piece when it was in script form and we thought, 'This is not going to survive if we approach it too politely', so... we decided we would do it as we did – we were a bit inspired by some of the Cary Grant movies of the '40s when they talked so quickly. So we thought we would pursue that line and feed the information to an audience at a fairly fast rate so that it keeps happening for them. There were mixed critiques. We had some friends and some foes. Those that loved it loved it - those that hated it were very angry about how fast we spoke.

== Possible inspirations ==
Williamson and Denis Whitburn worked on a World War II miniseries with director Chris Thomson titled The Last Bastion, which ran on Network Ten. The running time was 360 minutes. (Academy Home Entertainment released a version that ran only 160 minutes to US home video). The miniseries was much ballyhooed but was not well-rated. Also, Williamson assisted his brother-in-law, Chris Löfvén, on Oz, an Australian rock musical film that retold The Wizard of Oz on the streets of Melbourne. The fictional Land of Oz rarely comes up in Australian conversation; the term is used almost exclusively as the nickname for one's own country.

The title of the play Emerald City has been used as a frequent moniker and nickname for the city of Sydney ever since the play was first presented. The title has been attributed to Brett Sheehy who was Sydney Theatre Company's Literary Manager when the play was written and first produced. The play's director Richard Wherrett recalls in his autobiography The Floor of Heaven: My Life in Theatre that Sheehy suggested Emerald City as the title, which Williamson accepted, adding the line of dialogue, "The Emerald City of Oz. Everyone comes here along their yellow brick roads looking for the answers to their problems and all they find are the demons within themselves."

== Reception ==
The Australian Film Institute nominated the film for five awards: Best Actor (John Hargreaves), Best Achievement in Cinematography (Paul Murphy), Best Adapted Screenplay (David Williamson), Best Actress in a Supporting Role (Nicole Kidman), and Best Actor in a Supporting Role (Chris Haywood), for which it won.

Williamson enjoyed the adaptation saying it "had a lot of raw energy".

== Home media ==
The film has never been released on home video in the United States, though it has been shown on the cable channel Romance Classics. A region-free PAL DVD was released in the United Kingdom by an anonymous company in Herts (VFC31962 NL041; UPC: 5 017633 41002 >) sometimes given online as "Hollywood Classics". This edition was pressed with a ten-second jump in the master early in the film. Although this jump is noted on the counter, it happens in exactly the same place on all copies. In Germany, the film was released on DVD on 23 March 2012 under the title City of Sex.
