= Cultural depictions of Malcolm II of Scotland =

Malcolm II of Scotland has been depicted in historical fiction.

- The historical novel Pride of Lions (1996) by Morgan Llywelyn, depicts Malcolm II married to Blanaid. Blanaid is depicted as a daughter of Brian Boru. The novel presents as fact a theory mentioned in the non-fiction book, Brian Boru, King of Ireland (1982) by Roger Chatterton-Newman. Specifically, it claims that Malcolm II was a son-in-law and ally of Brian Boru. However, Chatterton-Newman failed to note his own sources on the subject, and genealogist Stewart Baldwin has doubted the plausibility of the connection. The main plot of the novel features a conflict between Donnchad mac Briain and his half-brother Tadc mac Briain over the throne of Munster. Donnchad and his mother Gormflaith ingen Murchada travel by sea to Scotland, seeking the aid of Donnchad's brother-in-law Malcolm II. Gormflaith successfully negotiates the alliance.
- The historical novel Macbeth: An Historical Novel of the Last Celtic King (2011) by Robert Harrison, opens with the victory of Malcolm II over his predecessor Kenneth III of Scotland. "Malcolm stood above the wounded King, sword upraised. No words were spoken, for they both knew the penalty of defeat. The blade whistled in its swiftness, and the bloody head of Kenneth rolled in the mud."

== Sources ==
- Harrison, Robert (2011), Macbeth: An Historical Novel of the Last Celtic King, iUniverse, ISBN 978-1462016129
