= William Youmans =

American actor

- Other name: Bill Youmans
- Education: SUNY Purchase (BFA)
- Occupations: Film, stage, television actor, singer
- Years active: 1981–present

William Youmans is an American Broadway, film and television actor and singer, best known for originating the roles of John Jacob Astor in Titanic: the Musical, Sir Richard Bingham in The Pirate Queen, and Doctor Dillamond in Wicked. He made a return to Wicked on March 7, 2023.

== Life and career ==
Youmans was born into a performing family; his great-uncle was Broadway composer Vincent Youmans. William attended the State University of New York at Purchase, graduating with a Bachelor of Fine Arts in drama. William made his Broadway debut in 1981, playing Leo Hubbard in The Little Foxes. He performed numerous roles in the original production of Big River and sang the role of Alcindoro in the Baz Luhrmann-directed revival of La Bohème. He also portrayed Sir Richard Bingham in The Pirate Queen and performed in the play The Farnsworth Invention. In 1986 he was in the Off Broadway play The Widow Claire by Horton Foote. He played a few different roles in the musical Coraline. He originated the roles of Albert and Ben in the world premiere of The Secret Garden. In 1993, Youmans played several roles in the Off-Broadway recording of Alan Menken's Weird Romance.

In 1997 he originated the role of John Jacob Astor in Titanic, and 2003, originated the role of Doctor Dillamond in Wicked. After a San Francisco tryout, in which the role was played by John Horton, the original Broadway production opened October 30, 2003, starring Kristin Chenoweth and Idina Menzel. Youmans left the role on July 24, 2005, and later reprised the role in the Chicago production for a limited engagement from December 12, 2006, through January 14, 2007. He can be heard on the show's original Broadway cast recording. He made a return on March 7, 2023.

In 2015, he originated the role to critical acclaim as The Director in Being Seen by Richard Gustin at the International Fringe Festival NYC.

In 2018, he played Bascombe and understudied the Starkeeper in the Broadway revival of Carousel. In November 2019, he joined the cast of To Kill a Mockingbird as Dr. Reynolds/Mr. Roscoe and understudy Link Deas and Sheriff Heck Tate.

== Film and television ==
Youmans appeared in the films Mrs. Soffel, Compromising Positions, Nadine, Fresh Horses and the independent film Last Supper.

Youmans' first television appearance was a made-for-television movie of a Mark Twain story, The Private History of a Campaign That Failed. He has since appeared on episodes of The Equalizer, Spenser: For Hire, NYPD Blue, Law & Order and Law & Order: Special Victims Unit.

== Filmography ==
=== Film ===
William Youmans film credits
Year	Title	Role	Notes
1984	Mrs. Soffel	Guard George Koslow	
1985	Compromising Positions	Motel clerk	
1987	Nadine	Boyd	
1988	Fresh Horses	Gary	
1992	Last Supper	The writer's son	
2011	Extremely Loud & Incredibly Close	Bartender	
2014	Birdman	Bartender (Tommy)	
2014	A Midsummer Night's Dream	Robin Starveling	

=== Television ===
William Youmans television credits
Year	Title	Role	Notes
1981	The Private History of a Campaign That Failed	Dunlap	TV movie
1985	The Equalizer	Ray	Episode: "The Children's Song"
1988	Spenser: For Hire	Stefan Smolens	1 episode
1995	NYPD Blue	Brina "Peter" Cahill	1 episode
1998	Law & Order	Byrne Chaikin	Episode: "Scrambled"
2000	Law & Order: Special Victims Unit	Ben Moreland	Episode: "Noncompliance"
2008	Law & Order	Larry Driscoll	Episode: "Called Home"
2018	Madam Secretary	David Clark	1 episode

=== Stage ===
Year	Title	Role	Notes
1976	Henry V	Court	The Public Theater, Off-Broadway
1981	The Little Foxes	Leo Hubbard (Replacement)	Martin Beck Theatre, Broadway
1983	The Life and Adventures of Nicholas Nickleby	Smike	Blackstone Theatre
1985	Big River	Ben Rogers/Hank	Eugene O'Neill Theatre, Broadway
1986	Shout Up a Morning	Pokehead	La Jolla Playhouse
1987	The Widow Claire	Ed Cordray	Circle in the Square Theatre, Off-Broadway
1989	The Tempest	Trinculo	Virginia Stage Company
1989	The Secret Garden	Captain Albert Lennox/Ben Weatherstaff	Virginia Stage Company
1990	The Swan	Bill	Actors Theatre of Louisville
1990	The Cherry Orchard	Yepikhodov	La Jolla Playhouse
1990	Twelfth Night	Sir Andrew Aguecheek	La Jolla Playhouse
1991	Androcles and the Lion	Androcles	Syracuse Stage
1992	Weird Romance	Joe	WPA Theatre, Off-Broadway
1993	Escape From Happiness	Junior	Yale Repertory Theatre
1994	The Who's Tommy	Uncle Ernie	National Tour
1995	The Lover	Various	Baltimore Center Stage
1997	Titanic	3rd Class Passenger/J.J. Astor	Lunt-Fontanne Theatre, Broadway
2001	Dracula, The Musical	Renfield	La Jolla Playhouse
2002	La Bohème	Alcindoro	Broadway Theatre, Broadway
2003	Wicked	Doctor Dillamond	Gershwin Theatre, Broadway
2005	Miracle Brothers	Rancor	Vineyard Theatre, Off-Broadway
2006	Brundibar	Professor Ucitelli	Yale Repertory Theatre
2006	The Pirate Queen	Sir Richard Bingham	Cadillac Palace Theatre
2007	The Pirate Queen	Sir Richard Bingham	Hilton Theatre, Broadway
2007	The Farnsworth Invention	Wachtel	Music Box Theatre, Broadway
2008	Billy Elliot: The Musical	George (Replacement)	Imperial Theatre, Broadway
2008	Road Show	Ensemble	The Public Theater, Off-Broadway
2009	Coraline	Other Father	MCC Theater, Off-Broadway
2009	Finian's Rainbow	Buzz Collins	St. James Theatre, Broadway
2010	Take Flight	Ensemble	McCarter Theatre
2010	Titanic	J. Bruce Ismay	The Muny
2011	Cymbeline	Pisanio	Shakespeare Theatre Company
2012	Giant	Pinkie	The Public Theater, Off-Broadway
2012	Titanic	J. Bruce Ismay	The Hangar Theatre
2013	Hands on a Hardbody	Don Curtis/Dr. Stokes	Brooks Atkinson Theatre, Broadway
2013	Summer of '42	Mr. Sanders/Walter Winchell	Bucks County Playhouse
2013	A Midsummer Night's Dream	Robin Starveling	Theatre for a New Audience, Off-Broadway
2013	Ether Dome	Dr. Charles Jackson	Hartford Stage, La Jolla Playhouse, Huntington Theatre Company
2015	Being Seen	The Director	International Fringe Festival NYC
2015	Paint Your Wagon	Jacob Woodling	New York City Center, Off-Broadway
2016	Bright Star	Stanford Adams	Cort Theatre, Broadway
2016	The Rocky Horror Show	The Narrator/Eddie/Dr. Scott	Bucks County Playhouse
2017	The Skin of Our Teeth	Mr. Fitzpatrick	Theatre for a New Audience, Off-Broadway
2017	Clue: On Stage	Various	Bucks County Playhouse
2018	Carousel	Mr. Bascombe	Imperial Theatre, Broadway
2019	To Kill a Mockingbird	Dr. Reynolds (Replacement)/Mr. Roscoe (Replacement)	Sam S. Shubert Theatre, Broadway
2022	A Man of No Importance	Baldy O'Shea	Classic Stage Company, Off-Broadway
