= SCKBSTD =

- a new musical by Bruce Hornsby
- Music: Bruce Hornsby
- Lyrics: Bruce Hornsby, Chip deMatteo
- Book: Clay McLeod Chapman
- Productions: 2011

SCKBSTD is a musical with music and lyrics by Bruce Hornsby, Chip deMatteo and a book by Clay McLeod Chapman, produced in 2011. The story is about what happens to a family when a mysterious stranger arrives in a small town bringing fear and paranoia in his wake.

== Background ==
A stranger comes to a small town with a terrible secret. His presence has unintended consequences for a doctor (Marcus Lovett) and his wife (Jill Paice). Fear and paranoia grow when a child goes missing. In the end an unbearable loss brings a family and a town back together.

The musical's quirky title spelling is a variation on "sick bastard." The show's logo is a vanity license plate.

SCKBSTD includes 19 original songs by three-time Grammy Award winner (and 13-time nominee) Bruce Hornsby, who has sold 11 million records. Songs from SCKBSTD were featured on Hornsby's 2009 CD Levitate.

== Productions ==
=== Virginia Stage Company (2011) ===
The world premiere of SCKBSTD took place at the Wells Theatre in Norfolk, VA on January 21, 2011, and ran until February 6, 2011. It was produced by Virginia Stage Company (Chris Hanna, artistic director; Keith Stava, managing director), in association with co-producers David Riemer & Mike Rafael for Spiral Staircase LLC, as part of VSC's "American Soil" series.

== Creative team ==
The creative team for the VSC production includes John Rando (a Tony Award winner for directing Urinetown), Kimberly Grigsby (musical supervisor of Spider-Man: Turn Off the Dark, Spring Awakening), Jodie Moore (musical director), Jerome Robbins' Broadway Tony winner Scott Wise (choreographer), Robert Wierzel (lighting designer), Narelle Sissons (set designer), Darrel Maloney (projection design), Jennifer Caprio (costume design) and Jessica Paz (sound design).

== Musical numbers ==
- "The Low Country"
- "Big Fish"
- "Holy Trinity"
- "Who Takes Care of Mom?"
- "Black Rats of London"
- "Simple Prayer"
- "The Don of Dons"
- "Where's the Bat?"
- "Invisible"
- "Continents Drift"
- "Paperboy"
- "If the World Only Knew"
- "Neighborhood Watch"
- "Michael/Raphael"
- "Simple Prayer" reprise
- "Soon Enough"
- "Here We Are Again"
- "Quasar"

One track, "Face to Face", was cut from the final play.

== Characters ==
Character	York Theatre 2012 company cast	Virginia Stage company cast	May 2010 reading cast	June 2009 reading cast
William	Ron Holgate	Bill Parry	John Cullum	John Cullum
Jill	Marissa O'Donnell	Brynn Wiliams	Brynn Wiliams	Brynn Wiliams
Tim	Charles Franklin	Charles Franklin	Dalton Harrod	Bubba Weiler
FedEx guy	Eugene Barry-Hill	Eugene Barry-Hill	James Moye	Darius de Haas
Susan	Garrett Long	Garrett Long	Anastasia Barzee	Anastasia Barzee
Sally	Rachel Bay Jones	Jayne Paterson	Becky Ann Baker	Anne Nathan
Afton	Lisa Brescia	Jill Paice	Jill Paice	Sarah Berry
UPS guy	Karl Warden	Karl Warden	Joey Sorge	Louis Hobson
Postman	Kenneth Cavett	Ken Cavett	Riley Costello	Riley Costello
Sheriff Rogers	Terence Archie	Kevin Mambo	William Parry	John Conlee
Jim	John Ellison Conlee	Marcus Lovett	J. Robert Spencer	Will Swenson
Paperboy	Riley Costello	Riley Costello	Riley Costello	Riley Costello
Norm	Lance Guest	Robert Cuccioli	Tom Wopat	Shuler Hensley
Jenny	Rosa Curry	Rosa Curry	Natalie Venetia Belcon	Tracee Beazer
Teacher/Vanity	Ashlee Dupre	Rosa Curry	Natalie Venetia Belcon	Tracee Beazer
