= Pride of Lions =

Pride of Lions may refer to:

- Pride, the collective noun for a group of lions
- Pride of Lions (novel), a 1996 novel by Morgan Llywelyn
- The Dependables, previously known as Pride of Lions, a 2014 family action film
- Pride of Lions, a band fronted by guitarist and keyboardist Jim Peterik
- Pride of the Lions, team-specific hall of Fame for Detroit Lions, an American football team
