= Marcus Lovett =

American singer and actor

Marcus Lovett (born 1965) is an American singer and actor who was born in Glen Ellyn, Illinois. He is known for his roles in musical theatre. His credits include leading roles in The Phantom of the Opera, Aspects of Love, Carousel and King David.

== Career ==
An actor, singer and athlete from childhood, Lovett graduated from Carnegie Mellon University with honors. His classmates included the actress Ming Na Wen. Lovett then immediately joined the original Broadway production of Les Miserables as an understudy for the role of Marius Pontmercy. He simultaneously appeared on ABC's One Life to Live. Additional Broadway and West End roles included leads in Aspects of Love (as Alex), The Phantom of the Opera (as The Phantom), and King David (as David), and Off-Broadway plays and musicals, including the Bruce Hornsby show, SCKBSTD. He originated the role of The Man in Whistle Down the Wind on the West End and appears on the original cast recording.

In 1994, Lovett made the front page of the New York Times by performing the lead in two Broadway shows in two days. After his final performance as The Phantom of the Opera (After which Jeff Keller took over), Lovett was asked to learn the role of Billy Bigelow in Carousel as an emergency replacement for the show's ailing star; in an unusual move, Lincoln Center had temporarily closed its production. 47 hours later, Lovett appeared at the Vivian Beaumont Theater as the tragic Bigelow. He would stay with the show after this serving as Michael Hayden's standby when he returned from his absence. He also participated in Andrew Lloyd Webber's 50th birthday concert at the Royal Albert Hall.

From 3 September 2012 to 31 August 2013, he reprised the role of The Phantom of the Opera, this time at Her Majesty's Theatre in the West End of London. Michael Crawford, Peter Jöback, and Lovett are the only people to play the Phantom in London and on Broadway.

Lovett's voice is the trademark for Good Morning America, This Week with George Stephanopoulos and, for seventeen years, The David Letterman Show, in addition to thousands of commercials and promotions for television and radio. His job requires a live recording studio whenever he travels: to that end, he maintains studios in the San Francisco Bay Area, Manhattan, Los Angeles and Carmel, New York, where he maintains his primary residence. He also is the founder of the non profit organization, JoinedHands.

He was married to Leslie Motiwalla on June 18, 2022.

== Stage credits ==
Year	Title	Role	Notes
1985	Man of La Mancha	Pedro	Heinz Hall
1985	Carousel	Ensemble	Heinz Hall
1987–1988	Les Misérables	Babet / Constable u/s Marius Pontmercy	Broadway
1990	Aspects of Love	Ensemble u/s Hugo LeMeunier	Broadway
1991	Aspects of Love	Alex Dillingham	Broadway
1993–1994	The Phantom of the Opera	The Phantom of the Opera	Broadway
1994	Carousel	Billy Bigelow	Broadway
1994	Carousel	s/b Billy Bigelow	Broadway
1997	King David	David	Broadway
1998–1999	Whistle Down the Wind	The Man	West End
2011	SCKBSTD	Jim Reynolds	Wells Theatre
2012–2013	The Phantom of the Opera	The Phantom of the Opera	West End
