= The Secret Garden (musical) =

1991 Broadway musical

- Music: Lucy Simon
- Lyrics: Marsha Norman
- Book: Marsha Norman
- Basis: The Secret Garden by Frances Hodgson Burnett
- Productions: 1989 Virginia Stage Company; 1991 Broadway; 1992 US Tour; 1995 Australia Tour; 2001 West End; 2016 25th Anniversary Concert; 2016 West End Revival; 2016 US Tour; 2022 West End Concert; 2026 UK Revival
- Awards: Tony Award for Best Book of a Musical; Drama Desk Award for Outstanding Musical

The Secret Garden is a musical based on the 1911 novel of the same name by Frances Hodgson Burnett. The musical's script and lyrics are by Marsha Norman, with music by Lucy Simon. It premiered on Broadway in 1991 and ran for 709 performances.

The story is set in the early years of the 20th century. (Note: In the original script of the play, the date is indicated as 1906, but the libretto for the Broadway cast album has the conflicting date of 1911.) Mary Lennox, an English girl born and raised in the British Raj, is orphaned by a cholera outbreak when she is ten years old. She is sent away from India to the moors of Yorkshire, England, to live in the manor of a brooding uncle she has never met. There, her personality blossoms among the other residents of the manor as they bring new life to a long-neglected garden.

An entirely different musical version of the novel, book and music written by the team of Jay Turvey and Paul Sportelli, premiered at Canada's Shaw Festival in 2024.

== Productions ==
The musical debuted as a staged reading at Skidmore College in Saratoga Springs, New York, in the summer of 1989, produced by Capital Repertory Theatre. R.J. Cutler directed the summer workshop, and went on to direct the world premiere at the Wells Theatre, Norfolk, Virginia, in a Virginia Stage Company production, running from November 28 to December 17, 1989. The production included scenic design by Heidi Landesman, lighting by Peter Kaczorowski and costumes by Martin Pakledinaz. It starred Victoria Clark as Martha, Michael McCormick as Neville, and William Youmans as Albert and Ben.

The Secret Garden premiered in New York City on Broadway at the St. James Theatre on April 25, 1991, and closed on January 3, 1993, after 709 performances. That production was directed by Susan H. Schulman, with choreography by Michael Lichtefeld. The cast featured Daisy Eagan as Mary Lennox, Mandy Patinkin, Rebecca Luker, Alison Fraser, Robert Westenberg and John Cameron Mitchell. It won the 1991 Tony Awards for: Best Book of a Musical, Best Featured Actress in a Musical (Daisy Eagan), and Best Scenic Design (Heidi Landesman). At age 11, Eagan was the youngest female recipient of a Tony Award to date. The set resembled an enormous Victorian toy theatre, with pop-out figures, large paper dolls, and elements resembling the collages of Joseph Cornell. Costume designer Theoni V. Aldredge was nominated for the Tony Award, Best Costume Design.

The wardrobe is on display at the Costume World Broadway Collection in Pompano Beach, Florida.

The musical was produced in Australia in 1995 in Brisbane (opened on 27 July), Sydney (opened on 7 September), and Melbourne (opened on 20 December). Directed by Schulman and with sets by Landesman, the production included Philip Quast as Neville Craven and Anthony Warlow as Archibald Craven.

A heavily revised Royal Shakespeare Company version ran at Stratford-upon-Avon in England from November 13, 2000, until January 27, 2001, at the time breaking box office records. Philip Quast, Meredith Braun, Peter Polycarpou, and Craig Purnell (Best Supporting Performance in a Musical, WhatsOnStage Awards 2002) starred, Adrian Noble directed, and Gillian Lynne staged and choreographed the production. The RSC production transferred to London's West End Aldwych Theatre, where it ran from February to June 2001.

Over the years, The Secret Garden found favor with local and regional theaters. The production mounted by Lamplighters Music Theatre in San Francisco, California, from January 18 to February 3, 2008, is unusual because it used notes from Lucy Simon's personal libretto from the original Broadway show, making it the first reconstruction of the original score since the piece opened on Broadway in 1991.

Mirvish Productions staged the play at the Royal Alexandra Theatre in Toronto, Canada, from February 13 to March 19, 2011, as part of a tour that began at the Edinburgh Festival Theatre in Edinburgh, Scotland.

The Secret Garden returned to the West End for six weeks in July and August 2016 at the Ambassadors Theatre with a company of child actors, directed by Rupert Hands.

Washington, D.C.'s Shakespeare Theatre Company, in collaboration with Seattle, Washington's 5th Avenue Theatre, presented the musical from November 15, 2016, to January 8, 2017, directed by David Armstrong. Michael Kahn (Artistic Director at the time) noted that this production is "an active reworking" of the musical. Daisy Eagan returned to the show as the chambermaid Martha, with Anya Rothman as Mary, Michael Xavier as Archibald Craven, and Josh Young as Dr. Neville Craven. The production has revisions that include new songs, deletions (including the songs "Round-Shouldered Man", "Quartet", "Race You to the Top of the Morning") and re-arranging. Overall, it condenses and streamlines the story to a shorter running time, with Norman and Simon's involvement. The production was performed at the 5th Avenue Theatre in Seattle from April 14 to May 6, 2017, and at the Theatre Under the Stars in Houston, Texas, October 10–22. That January, Playbill wrote about plans for this production to go to Broadway, but the production's timeline was canceled.

In February 2018, Playbill wrote about plans for the first Broadway revival, with Warren Carlyle as director/choreographer and with a cast, theatre, and other details to come. A lab production prior to the Broadway revival, also directed by Carlyle, was planned to run from May 19 to June 8. Participants in the lab production included Sierra Boggess as Lily, Matt Doyle as Albert, Drew Gehling as Neville, Clifton Duncan as Archibald, Ali Ewoldt as Rose, and Brooklyn Shuck as Mary. The revival did not come to pass in the 2018–19 season and there has been no further word on the project. When Warren Carlyle was interviewed by Ken Davenport for The Producer's Perspective Podcast in May 2019, he said that the revival was still on the table. They had a cast lined up, they were just waiting for the right theatre to be available. The revival's workshop streamed from May 6 to 9, 2021. The production premiered at the Ahmanson Theatre in Los Angeles and will run from February 19 through March 26, 2023. Sierra Boggess has been announced to star as Lily. Other cast members include Sadie Brickman Reynolds as Mary Lennox, Derrick Davis as Archibald Craven, Emily Jewel Hoder as Mary Lennox, Aaron Lazar as Dr. Neville Craven, Julia Lester as Martha, John-Michael Lyles as Dickon, Terron Brooks as Major Shelley, Mark Capri as Ben Weatherstaff, Peyton Crim as Major Holmes, Susan Denaker as Mrs. Medlock, Kelley Dorney as Mrs. Winthrop/Cholera, Ali Ewoldt as Rose Lennox, William Foon as Colin Craven alternate, Ava Madison Gray as Mary Lennox alternate, John Krause as Captain Albert Lennox, Reese Levine as Colin Craven, Yamuna Meleth as Ayah, Cassandra Marie Murphy as Mrs. Shelley, James Olivas as Lieutenant Wright, Kyla Jordan Stone as Alice, Vishal Vaidya as Fakir, and Ariel Neydavoud as Lieutenant Shaw, with Randi De Marco and Sam Linkowski serving as swings.

Opera Australia and the Gordon Frost Organisation intended to stage the 25th-anniversary production, again directed by Susan H. Schulman, opening in Sydney in August 2020, with a Melbourne season to follow. Anthony Warlow was expected to reprise the role of Archibald Craven, the rest of the cast included Rowena Wallace as Mrs. Medlock, Rob McDougall as Neville, Georgina Hopson as Lily, Alinta Chidzey as Martha, Nigel Huckle as Dickon, and Rodney Dobson as Ben Weatherstaff. Opera Australia canceled the 25th-anniversary production in April 2020 because of the COVID-19 pandemic.

In 2026, an actor-musician revival of the show was performed at York Theatre Royal in the UK directed by John Doyle, with musical supervision by Catherine Jayes.

=== Concerts ===
The Secret Garden was The Third Annual World AIDS Day Benefit Concert, held on December 5, 2005, at the Manhattan Center Studios Grand Ballroom, New York City. This was the first New York revisitation of the show since its original Broadway run. The concert was directed by Stafford Arima and produced by Jamie McGonnigal. The cast featured Laura Benanti as Lily, Steven Pasquale as Archie, Will Chase as Neville, Celia Keenan-Bolger as Martha, David Canary as Ben, Jaclyn Neidenthal as Mary, Struan Erlenborn as Colin, Max von Essen as Albert, Sara Gettelfinger as Rose, and Michael Arden as Dickon. The cast also included Matt Cavenaugh, Jenny Powers, Ben Magnuson, Shonn Wiley, Reshma Shetty, Deborah S. Craig, Nehal Joshi, and Kate Shindle, with Barbara Rosenblat returning to the role she created, Mrs. Medlock.

Manhattan Concert Productions presented a 25th anniversary concert production of The Secret Garden at Lincoln Center for two nights on February 21 and 22, 2016, with Sydney Lucas starring as Mary Lennox. She was joined by the original "Mary Lennox", Daisy Eagan, who now plays the role of Martha, and Barbara Rosenblat, returning to her original role of Mrs. Medlock. Also in the cast were Ramin Karimloo as Archibald Craven, Sierra Boggess as Lily, Cheyenne Jackson as Neville Craven, Ben Platt as Dickon, Jere Shea as Ben, Oscar Williams as Colin Craven, Nikki Renée Daniels as Rose, Josh Young as Captain Albert Lennox and Telly Leung as Fakir.

Rebecca Luker (the original Lily) appeared in a benefit concert for the Make-A-Wish Foundation of Metro New York and Western New York at the Lucille Lortel Theatre on January 11, 2016. The concert was originally scheduled to be one night only, but a second performance was added for January 17. Daisy Eagan, the original "Mary Lennox" was the host for the concerts.

The Secret Garden (in concert) was presented in Toronto, Canada, in January 2017 as the inaugural show of a newly formed theatre company Podium Concert Productions, headed by Producer Peter da Costa and Conductor Mark Camilleri.

In February 2019, The Secret Garden was presented by the Virginia Stage Company in the Norfolk Botanical Gardens in a concert to celebrate the company's 40th anniversary. This is the first time that The Secret Garden has been staged there since the World Premiere in 1989.

A one night concert version of the musical played at the London Palladium on August 28, 2022. This has been postponed twice due to COVID-19. The cast has Westlife's Mark Feehily and acclaimed West End actor Hadley Fraser as the two brothers, joined by rising star Darcy Jacobs as Mary. The concert follows the original Broadway version, which has never been performed in the U.K until now.

== Synopsis ==
This synopsis describes the original Broadway production; the reworked London production altered this sequence by moving or omitting several scenes and songs.

=== Act I ===
Mary Lennox, a sickly 10-year-old English girl has mostly lived in isolation in India ("Opening"). (Note: Mary sings Hindi lyrics that are transcribed in the script and libretto, but not translated; phrased in poetic language, their approximate meaning is "Lo, the season of magic/ The summer days/ Prayers, rituals, and artifacts/ May deliver her from sickness".) Survivors of a cholera outbreak discover Mary alone, informing her that her parents and nearly everyone she knew have died ("There's a Girl").

Mary is sent to live in Yorkshire, England with her uncle Archibald Craven, a reclusive hunchback who has spent years grieving the death of his wife, Lily. The management of his manor house, Misselthwaite, is largely left to his manipulative brother, Dr. Neville Craven. The housekeeper, Mrs. Medlock, coldly welcomes Mary to Yorkshire ("The House Upon the Hill"). Due to Archibald and Mary's lingering grief, the house is haunted by ghosts from their pasts. Lonely and misbehaving, Mary hears echoes of crying voices during her first night at Misselthwaite ("I Heard Someone Crying"). The next morning, Martha, an inspiring young chambermaid, encourages Mary to go play outside by telling her about a hidden garden nearby ("If I Had a Fine White Horse"). Archibald remains submerged in his deathly memories of Lily ("A Girl In the Valley").

Mary explores the grounds' Victorian-style topiary maze, discovering the walled garden completely overgrown with ivy. She encounters an elderly gardener ("It's a Maze"), who says the garden has been locked since Lily's death, as it reminds Archibald too much of her. Martha's mystical brother Dickon invokes the spring ("Winter's On the Wing"), and he gives Mary some seeds, claiming that he can converse with animals, who guide Mary to the garden's long-lost key ("Show Me the Key").

Inside the manor, Neville and Archibald are discussing a bedridden boy when Mary suddenly enters. She asks Archibald for a bit of soil to plant a garden of her own. Archibald agrees and muses on Lily and Mary's shared interest in gardening ("A Bit of Earth"). During a fearsome storm ("Storm I"), Archibald and Neville grieve separately over Lily; thus, it is revealed that both brothers were in love with her ("Lily's Eyes").

Mary again hears crying ("Storm II"), but this time she uncovers its source: Colin, a secret cousin of hers who has been confined to bed since his birth, probably under Neville's deceptive advice that he would also become a hunchback. Colin recounts nightly dreams of a man who reads to him from a magical book ("Round-Shouldered Man"). However, just as Mary and Colin embrace each other's company, Neville and Mrs. Medlock burst in and angrily tell her she is never to see Colin again because of his fragile medical condition. A distraught Mary runs outside, where the spectre of Lily appears, revealing the location of the ivy-covered door to the garden ("Final Storm").

=== Act II ===
Mary dreamily desires the garden to offer her privacy and self-discovery ("The Girl I Mean to Be"). Meanwhile, Neville wants Archibald to leave Misselthwaite entirely to him. The two brothers' thoughts are interwoven with phantom-like old arguments between Lily and Mary's mother about Archibald's suitability as a husband and father ("Quartet"). The melancholy Archibald decides to slip away to Paris for a while, pausing only to read a fairy tale to Colin while the boy sleeps ("Race You To the Top of the Morning"). Thus, the "round-shouldered man" is not a dream at all but merely Colin's own father.

Mary tells Dickon that she has now been inside the garden but the plants are all dead. Dickon explains that, with some assistance, it will grow back ("Wick"). Mary tells Colin about the garden, and a ghostly vision of his mother Lily encourages him to visit it ("Come to My Garden/Lift Me Up"). In the garden, exercise, fresh air, and Mary and Dickon's magical incantations strengthen Colin, allowing him to rise from his wheelchair for the first time ("Come Spirit, Come Charm"). Colin makes Mary and the staff promise not to tell Archibald about Colin's recovery until he is able to fully walk, while onlooking spirits sing praises of the renewed garden ("A Bit of Earth (Reprise)").

Back at Misselthwaite, Neville threatens to send Mary away to boarding school and slaps her ("Disappear"). Immediately after, Martha tells Mary to stay strong ("Hold On"), helping Mary write to Archibald in Paris, urging him to come home ("Letter Song"). Archibald initially disagrees ("Where In the World"); however, Lily's ghost gives him the courage to care for their child ("How Could I Ever Know"). Returning home, he enters the garden to find Colin completely healthy, running around with Mary. A changed man, Archibald sends Neville away and triumphantly embraces Mary and Colin back into his life. The spirits of Mary's parents join Lily, promising to keep the children safe in the years to come ("Finale").

=== Changes from the original novel ===
Burnett's novel primarily focused on Mary and her interactions with Colin, Martha, and Dickon. The musical adds more emphasis on the adult characters by presenting (and to some extent, inventing) the shared history entwining the two families. Originally, Burnett stated that the name of Archibald's wife was Lilias, and that she was the sister of Mary Lennox's father; in the musical, Colin's and Mary's mothers are sisters named Lily and Rose respectively.

In the book, Colin's private physician is an otherwise unnamed poor cousin of Archibald Craven; Colin privately remarks to Mary that Dr. Craven is the next heir to Misselthwaite and "always looks cheerful when [Colin's health] is worse", but Burnett also states that Dr. Craven is "not an unscrupulous man, though he was a weak one, and he did not intend to let [Colin] run into actual danger". The musical heightens the doctor's conflict of interest and makes him the primary antagonist as Archibald's brother, Dr. Neville Craven, who once hopelessly loved Lily. Mary expressly accuses of him of wanting Colin to die for the sake of his inheritance.

== Songs ==
Act I

- "Opening" – Lily, Mary, Company
- "There's a Girl (Part I)" – Company
- "The House Upon the Hill" – Company
- "There's a Girl (Part II)" – Company
- "I Heard Someone Crying" – Lily, Mary, Archibald, Company
- "If I Had A Fine White Horse" – Martha
- "A Girl in the Valley" – Lily, Archibald
- "It's a Maze" – Mary, Ben, Dickon
- "Winter's on the Wing" – Dickon
- "Show Me the Key" – Mary, Dickon
- "It's a Maze (Reprise I)" - Company
- "A Bit of Earth" – Archibald
- "Storm I" – Company
- "Lily's Eyes" – Archibald, Neville
- "Storm II" – Mary, Company
- "Round-Shouldered Man" – Colin
- "Final Storm" – Company

Act II

- "The Girl I Mean to Be" – Mary
- "The House Upon the Hill (Reprise)" – Company
- "Quartet" – Archibald, Lily, Neville, Rose
- "There's a Man" – Company
- "Race You to the Top of the Morning" – Archibald
- "It's a Maze (Reprise II)" – Albert, Rose
- "Wick" – Dickon, Mary
- "Come to My Garden" – Lily
- "Lift Me Up" – Colin
- "Come Spirit, Come Charm" – Mary, Dickon, Martha, Lily, Company
- "A Bit of Earth (Reprise)" – Lily, Rose, Albert
- "Disappear" – Neville
- "Hold On" – Martha
- "Letter Song" – Mary, Archibald, Martha
- "Where in the World?" – Archibald
- "How Could I Ever Know?" – Lily, Archibald
- "Come Spirit, Come Charm (Reprise)" – Dickon, Mary, Colin
- "Finale: Come to My Garden (Reprise)" – Company

== Characters, casts, and recordings ==
=== Casts ===
Character	Broadway	US National Tour	Australia	West End	Off-Broadway Revival	25th Anniversary Concert	Washington D.C.	Seattle	West End Concert	Los Angeles	UK Revival
Character	1991	1992	1995	2001	2016			2017	2022	2023	2026
Mary Lennox	Daisy Eagan	Melody Kay Kimberly Mahon	Samantha Fiddes Sarah Ogden	Natalie Morgan Eliza Caird Tasmin Egerton Dick	Gabriella Pizzolo	Sydney Lucas	Anya Rothman	Bea Corley	Darcy Jacobs	Emily Jewel Hoder	Estella Evans Poppy Jason
Lord Archibald Craven	Mandy Patinkin	Kevin McGuire	Anthony Warlow	Philip Quast	Bradley Dean	Ramin Karimloo	Michael Xavier	Tam Mutu	Hadley Fraser	Derrick Davis	Henry Jenkinson
Lily Craven	Rebecca Luker	Anne Runolfsson	Marina Prior	Meredith Braun	Rebecca Luker	Sierra Boggess	Lizzie Klemperer	Lizzie Klemperer	Emma Williams	Sierra Boggess	Joanna Hickman
Dr. Neville Craven	Robert Westenberg	Douglas Sills	Philip Quast	Peter Polycarpou*	Max von Essen	Cheyenne Jackson	Josh Young	Josh Young	Mark Feehily	Aaron Lazar	André Refig
Martha Sowerby	Alison Fraser	Tracey Moore	Susan-Ann Walker	Linzi Hateley	Cortney Wolfson	Daisy Eagan	Daisy Eagan	Daisy Eagan	Maiya Quansah-Breed	Julia Lester	Catrin Mai Edwards
Dickon Sowerby	John Cameron Mitchell	Roger Bart	Tom Blair	Craig Purnell	Tom Deckman	Ben Platt	Charlie Franklin	Charlie Franklin	Alex Thomas-Smith	John-Michael Lyles	Elliot Mackenzie
Colin Craven	John Babcock	Sean Considine Luke Hogan	Bart Ritchie Ross Hannaford	Luke Newberry Eddie Brown Adam Clarke	Eli Tokash	Oscar Williams	Henry Baratz	Guthrie Greenwood Bettinger	Isaac Lancel-Watkinson	Reese Levine	Cristian Buttaci Dexter Pulling
Rose Lennox	Kay Walbye	Jacquelyn Piro Donovan	Carolyn Ferrie	Carmen Cusack	Ali Ewoldt	Nikki Renée Daniels	Brittany Baratz	Brittany Baratz	Glain Rhys	Ali Ewoldt	
Captain Albert Lennox	Michael DeVries	Kevin Dearinger	Shaun Murphy	Alistair Robins	Unknown	Josh Young	Jason Forbach	Jason Forbach	Michael Riseley	John Krause	
Ben Weatherstaff	Thomas Toner	Jay Garner	Raymond Duprac	Freddie Davies	Bill Nolte	Jere Shea	Seán G. Griffin	Seán G. Griffin	Howard Scott Walker	Mark Capri	Steve Simmonds
Mrs. Medlock	Barbara Rosenblat	Mary Fogarty	June Salter	Dilys Laye	Frances Mercanti-Anthony	Barbara Rosenblat	Catherine Flye	Marianne Owen	Linda John-Pierre	Susan Denaker	Elizabeth Marsh
Mrs. Winthrop											Ann Marcuson
Ensemble											Stephanie Cremona, Matthew James Hinchliffe, Lara Lewis, and Melinda Orengo

(*On the London cast recording, this role was sung by Christian Patterson)

==== Notable Broadway replacements (1991-93) ====
- Mary Lennox: Melody Kay
- Archibald Craven: Howard McGillin
- Ben Weatherstaff: Bill Nolte (u/s)

==== Additional notable performers ====
- Archibald Craven: Brent Barrett, Earl Carpenter, Robert Cuccioli, Kevin Earley, Max von Essen, Jeremy Kushnier, Peter Lockyer, Sean Palmer, Steven Pasquale, Douglas Sills
- Lily Craven: Laura Benanti, Patti Cohenour, Mari Hanafusa
- Dr. Neville Craven: James Barbour, Will Chase, Darren Dunstan, Michael McCormick
- Martha Sowerby: Victoria Clark, Celia Keenan-Bolger
- Dickon Sowerby: Michael Arden, Colton Ryan
- Rose Lennox: Sara Gettelfinger
- Captain Albert Lennox: James Barbour, Max von Essen, William Youmans
- Ben Weatherstaff: David Canary, William Youmans

=== Cast recordings ===
A full recording was made with the original Broadway cast, including all of the songs listed above as well as some interstitial material, and released on CD by Columbia Records in 1991 (catalog number CK 48817). Colin's part in the second act duet "Come to My Garden / Lift Me Up" was recorded by Joel E. Chaiken because, by the time the album was recorded, Babcock's voice had changed, and he could no longer the boy soprano range required in the song.

An eight-song "highlights" album with Fiddes, Ritchie, and the rest of the Australian cast was released on CD by Polydor Records Australia in 1995 (catalog number 579 997-2).

The original London production was partially reworked for production by the Royal Shakespeare Company, reducing the emphasis on the adult characters to return the plot closer to the original book. A full recording of this version was released on CD by First Night Records in 2001.

== Awards and nominations ==
=== Original Broadway production ===
Year	Award	Category	Nominee	Result
1991	Tony Award	Best Musical		Nominated
1991	Tony Award	Best Book of a Musical	Marsha Norman	Won
1991	Tony Award	Best Original Score	Lucy Simon and Marsha Norman	Nominated
1991	Tony Award	Best Featured Actress in a Musical	Daisy Eagan	Won
1991	Tony Award	Best Featured Actress in a Musical	Alison Fraser	Nominated
1991	Tony Award	Best Scenic Design	Heidi Landesman	Won
1991	Tony Award	Best Costume Design	Theoni V. Aldredge	Nominated
1991	Drama Desk Award	Outstanding Musical		Nominated
1991	Drama Desk Award	Outstanding Book of a Musical	Marsha Norman	Won
1991	Drama Desk Award	Outstanding Actor in a Musical	Mandy Patinkin	Nominated
1991	Drama Desk Award	Outstanding Actress in a Musical	Daisy Eagan	Nominated
1991	Drama Desk Award	Outstanding Featured Actor in a Musical	John Cameron Mitchell	Nominated
1991	Drama Desk Award	Outstanding Featured Actress in a Musical	Alison Fraser	Nominated
1991	Drama Desk Award	Outstanding Featured Actress in a Musical	Rebecca Luker	Nominated
1991	Drama Desk Award	Outstanding Director of a Musical	Susan H. Schulman	Nominated
1991	Drama Desk Award	Outstanding Choreography	Michael Lichtefeld	Nominated
1991	Drama Desk Award	Outstanding Orchestrations	William David Brohn	Won
1991	Drama Desk Award	Outstanding Lyrics	Marsha Norman	Nominated
1991	Drama Desk Award	Outstanding Music	Lucy Simon	Nominated
1991	Drama Desk Award	Outstanding Set Design	Heidi Landesman	Won
1991	Drama Desk Award	Outstanding Lighting Design	Tharon Musser	Nominated
1991	New York Drama Critics' Circle Award	Best Musical	Lucy Simon and Marsha Norman	Runner-up
