= King David (musical) =

1997 musical by Alan Menken and Tim Rice

- Music: Alan Menken
- Lyrics: Tim Rice
- Book: Tim Rice
- Basis: Biblical story of David
- Premiere: May 18, 1997: New Amsterdam Theatre
- Productions: 1997 Broadway concert

King David: A World Premiere Concert Event is a 1997 oratorio (sometimes described as a work-in-progress musical), co-produced by The Walt Disney Company and Andre Djaoui, and written by Alan Menken (music) and Tim Rice (libretto). Originally conceived by Djaoui as a grand musical performed in Jerusalem to celebrate the 3000th anniversary of the city's founding, it was eventually staged as a concert in the first production at Broadway's New Amsterdam Theater after Disney's restoration. Opening on May 18, 1997 (after three previews beginning May 15), the show ran for six performances closing May 23.

King David is a song-cycle about David whom Alan Menken deems "one of the great heroes of Jewish history", and is based on Biblical tales from the Books of Samuel and 1 Chronicles, as well as text from David's Psalms. It retells the Old Testament story of the shepherd boy, David, who rises from his humble roots to become King of Israel, including the drama between him and Saul and David's trials and tribulations in the foundation of Jerusalem."

At present, there are no plans for a fully staged Broadway production.

== History ==
=== Conception ===
King David was originally conceived in 1994 by Jerusalem 3000 producer Andre Djaoui as a musical based on the life of King David to commemorate the 3,000th anniversary of the founding of the city of Jerusalem; it was to be performed in 1996 at Sultan's Pool, an archaeological site which had since been turned into concert arena. Djaoui described it as “the most spectacular and dramatic production ever staged, as well as conveying a message of inspiration, hope and peace to the world”. The show was expected to tour worldwide, including in Los Angeles, before playing on Broadway and the West End.

Djaoui approached Menken and Rice about writing the piece; Menken took on song-writing duties while bringing on his collaborator Rice for the libretto; the two were sought-after due to the former's Broadway success Beauty and the Beast and the latter's cinema hit The Lion King. Rice had previously helped Menken complete the scores of Aladdin and Beauty and the Beast after Menken's partner Howard Ashman died of AIDS; this would be their first full score together. The show would also be Rice's third Biblical-themed musical, having previously written the lyrics to Jesus Christ Superstar and Joseph and the Amazing Technicolor Dreamcoat; Rice has since developed a long-time interest in the character of Saul, and utilised the opportunity to theatrically explore the character tragic narrative in the context of his rivalry with David. By November, cast and production crew have not yet been selected.

Over the next couple of years meeting dates became difficult to arrange and the project languished. Menken collaborated with Stephen Schwartz on Disney's The Hunchback of Notre Dame, and afterwards both men moved on to Biblical projects: Schwartz to The Prince of Egypt and Menken returned to King David. While Djaoui had wanted a grandeous musical, Menken assessed "the enormous space really could only handle a concert" so the project evolved into a humbler oratorio. By December 1995, Disney had come on as a producing partner to Djaoui, and the company re-announced King David to the press as an Israeli concert to be performed in September 1996 featuring Israeli and American actors, though no one had yet been cast. Robert W. McTyre, senior vice president of Walt Disney Theatrical Productions said, "this work is being written as a concert – or as Alan [Menken] would say, an oratorio" and that following the performance “then we'll see what kind of life it has".

=== Disney ===
King David's planned debut in Caesarea, Israel in September 1996 was cancelled; Menken cited the score not being completed and due to security concerns; ultimately an opportunity arose at the New Amsterdam once Disney came on as producer. According to Rice, "when it proved logistically and financially impossible to do it and Disney took an interest, we changed gears". Classic New York History argues Disney chose to reopen the New Amsterdam Theatre with King David and a screening of the Hercules movie so that press related to the reopening would not be overshadowed by that of the soon-to-be major hit The Lion King.

After being an open secret in the industry and "months of speculation", on August 19, 1996 The King David project was officially re-announced by Walt Disney CEO Michael Eisner at a press event in Sardi's theatrical restaurant as the first show put on at Disney's New Amsterdam Theater on Broadway as a limited engagement of five concert performances in May 1997. Reporters gathered around a piano while Menken performed a seven-minute preview of songs from the oratorio. Eisner noted the first full production was still a "toss-up" between The Lion King and Aida with the decision not being made until after Disney execs attended a reading of The Lion King. Rice opined ''it's really a fairly un-Broadway piece...something that we hope will work eventually on Broadway, but the great thing is we haven't had to worry about how we get people on and off stage. It's a work in progress". Eisner described the concert as the first step toward the theatricalization of King David as a full stage production. Noting its unfinished quality, The New York Times later described it as "Broadway's most lavish workshop".

=== Writing ===
"From the point of view of the piece, it might not have been the best way to open cold in a magnificent, virtually new theatre, which inevitably attracted a lot of attention. And all this stress and work to play only a few days. On the other hand, Alan and I feel it's been a terrific chance to get something on the boards quickly. We intended this to be the first stage of development. Instead of having continuing previews, we're regrouping in six to nine months -- after Lion King."

— Tim Rice's thoughts on King David's premiere at the restored New Amsterdam Theatre

Menken and Rice found that the story divided itself into two halves - David and Saul in the first part (where he is written as a hero) and the succession story in the second part (where he is written as flawed) - in their assessment, both the Biblical treatment and modern-day perception views these tales of David as "virtually two stories [featuring] almost two characters", noting a generally-accepted theory of them being written by two separate authors. The team decided against a clear viewpoint of the Bible as a work of fiction versus a record of historical events, and instead focused on the political and psychological life of a leader with modern day allegories. Rice's lyrics jump between classical and contemporary references, and balance both the humorous and dramatic.

=== Production ===
By August 1996, casting was underway with the cast and design team being announced by November, and tickets going on sale before the end of the year. At this time, a fully staged version was being considered for the fall of 1998. The show featured two actors known to Disney audience for their performance in animated movies - Judy Kuhn as the singing voice of Pocahontas and Roger Bart as the singing voice of Hercules in the then-upcoming film of the same name. During initial press, the creative team avoided drawing attention to Julie Taymor's The Lion King, which incorporated Rice's score to the 1994 film, which was expected to replace King David for the 1996-97 season. Disney officials would not comment on the cost of the concert presentation of "David" or the price of tickets, though they intimated the latter would fall in line with current Broadway levels.

Premiering on May 15, 1997 five days earlier than originally scheduled, the two-hour 40-minute, 30-song song cycle was presented with a chorus of 30 and an orchestra of 65; the performers were costumed and there was a set, but the production was not choreographed or fully staged. Mayor Rudolph W. Giuliani delivered the curtain speech this evening at the opening night of King David. By May 23, the art work had been completed and advertisements for the forthcoming CD were released.

Ockrent doubted the nature of piece would make it eligible for a Tony Award; this proved not to matter as King David opened after the deadline for the 1997 awards voting had closed.

== Music ==
King David is mostly sung-through with little dialogue, and the music incorporates genres ranging from pop, jazz, and rock, to grand ballad-like choral arrangements. It uses a large orchestra and a large choir. The piece is based on biblical tales from the Books of Samuel, 1 Chronicles and David's Psalms. Playbill described the style of songs in King David as "most similar" to his score for the unproduced TV musical "Messiah on Mott Street". The piece contains around 5,000 bars of music, compared to Beauty and the Beast' which only has 2,200 bars. For Menken, the process of making King David was like writing an album, where he played with styles including Semitic Middle Eastern, cantorial, pop, and classical. Menken wanted to incorporate period instruments, while keeping a contemporary sense of being "drawn into another time". He noted on May 11, "there are five orchestrators, some of them working round the clock, and we're still probably not going to get this completed by the first orchestra rehearsal".

The New York Times felt the show "set[s] these exultant exclamations, sung by a horde of victory-drunk ancient Israelites, to a rousing, peppy melody that bizarrely evokes the fare that clean-cut choral groups like the New Christy Minstrels used to perform".

The May 20 performance was recorded live and released as an album in 1997, in an effort to rush a June release. During filming the sound board computer failed and the first act had to be mixed by hand; as a safeguard the Wednesday matinee and evening performances were also recorded. Rice's intention was to follow the same developmental route he and Andrew Lloyd Webber undertook with Jesus Christ Superstar and Evita, which started life as recordings and concerts respectively. A cast album was released, which cuts several musical numbers and reprises.

The album entitled Alan Menken & Tim Rice's King David - A World Premiere Concert Event - Highlights from the Live Performance was released on June 24, 1997.

The ballad "Never Again" has been performed by Patti LuPone at a Hollywood Bowl concert in 1997 and recorded by Ruthie Henshall on her 2001 "Pilgrim" album. Of the song, Ben Brantley wrote Kuhn's original interpretation "dazzlingly turns an unremarkable song, ''Never Again,'' into an incisive emotional portrait that stops the show".

=== Musical numbers ===
Act I

- Prologue – David, Bathsheba, Young Solomon, Joab and Chorus

Samuel

- Israel and Saul – Joab, Samuel, Saul and Chorus
- Samuel Confronts Saul – Saul, Samuel, Agag and Chorus
- Samuel Anoints David – Joab, Samuel, Jesse, David and Chorus

Saul

- The Enemy Within – Saul and Chorus
- There is a View... – Joab, Abner, Saul and Chorus
- Psalm 8 – David
- Genius from Bethlehem – Saul, David, Abner, Joab, Jonathan and Michal

Goliath

- The Valley of Elah – Goliath, Abner, Joab, David, Saul and Soldiers
- Goliath of Gath – Goliath, David, Joab, Soldiers and Chorus
- Sheer Perfection – Joab, Saul, David and Michal

Jonathan

- Saul Has Slain His Thousands – Joab and Chorus
- You Have It All – Saul, Jonathan and David
- Psalm 23 – Saul and David
- You Have It All/Sheer Perfection (Reprises) – Jonathan, Joab, Michal and David

Exile

- Hunted Partridge on the Hill – Joab, Saul, Michal, David and Men
- The Death of Saul – Saul, Jonathan, Ghost of Samuel and Chorus
- How Are The Mighty Fallen

Act II

David the King

- This New Jerusalem – David, Absalom, Voice of Jonathan, Joab and Chorus
- David and Michal – David, Joab and Michal
- The Ark Brought to Jerusalem – David and Chorus
- Never Again – Michal and David

Bathsheba

- How Wonderful the Peace – Absalom, Joab, David and Chorus
- Off Limits – Bathsheba, David and Joab
- Warm Spring Night – David
- When in Love – Bathsheba
- Uriah's Fate Sealed – David, Joab, Bathsheba and Chorus
- Atonement – David, Ghosts of Saul & Samuel, Bathsheba and Chorus

Absalom

- The Caravan Moves On – Joab, Absalom, David, Ghosts of Saul & Samuel and Men
- Death of Absalom – Joab and Absalom
- Absalom My Absalom – David

David's Final Days

- Solomon – Solomon, Joab, David and Bathsheba
- David's Final Hours – Michal, David, Joab, Bathsheba, Voices of Goliath, Saul, Jonathan & Samuel and Chorus
- The Long Long Day – David
- This New Jerusalem (Reprise) – Solomon and Company

== Productions ==
A concert version, produced by Disney Theatrical Productions and André Djaoui and directed by Mike Ockrent, was presented as the inaugural production at Disney's newly renovated New Amsterdam Theatre (the former home of the Ziegfeld Follies), playing for a nine-performance limited run in May 1997. The cast included Roger Bart, Stephen Bogardus, Judy Kuhn, Alice Ripley, Martin Vidnovic, and Michael Goz, with Marcus Lovett in the title role. The piece ran two hours and 45 minutes and was only partially staged.

On September 6, 1997, Patti LuPone, Davis Gaines, and Rebecca Luker gave a concert at the Hollywood Bowl that ended with three selections from King David. There was a production in Irving, Texas in 2004. Amateur and school productions include: Landmark Christian School Newnan, Georgia, near Atlanta in 2005. A concert performance was produced by NYU Steinhardt's Vocal Performance and the NYU Symphony Orchestra in conjunction with the authors on November 13 and 14, 2008. In the summer of 2012, Neighborhood Church in Castro Valley, California, near Oakland, performed the musical as part of their yearly Summer Musical Series.

Two selections from the show were performed at the Broadway and Beyond concert at Anaheim Convention Center for D23 Expo 2013; Thomas Schumacher who hosted the event advised he wanted to include the show in the Disney on Broadway retrospective as the show is so rarely heard or discussed.

In 2009, Rice put on a concert performance of the troubled show Chess and planned to do the same for King David, in an effort to focus solely on workshopping the score without regard for the book, costumes, or set, a strategy he had previously employed for Lloyd-Webber's musicals; he also planned to meet with Menken to discuss the future of the show. In 2011, Rice noted, "Alan [Menken] and I had lunch the other day and we discussed the fact that we really must get King David somehow back onto a stage. I think it's got some potential". In 2017, Menken explained, "I'd like to go back and fix King David", but that his schedule was filled by the Disney's live-action remakes of his scores, with Beauty and the Beast (2017) released, and Aladdin (2019) and The Little Mermaid (2023) in production.

In 2019, two selections from the show were performed as part of the Disney's Broadway Hits concert at Royal Albert Hall.

At present, there are no plans for a fully staged Broadway production.

== Original cast ==
The work has seven main singing parts, including that of David, his wife Bathsheba, their son Solomon, and Goliath. There is also a chorus of 30 and an orchestra of 65.

- Roger Bart – Jonathan
- Stephen Bogardus – Joab
- Anthony Galde – Absalom
- Judy Kuhn – Michal
- Marcus Lovett – David
- Alice Ripley – Bathsheba
- Peter Samuel – Samuel
- Martin Vidnovic – King Saul
- Bill Nolte – Goliath
- Timothy Shew – Abner
- Timothy Robert Blevins – Agag
- Peter C. Ermides – Uriah
- Michael Goz – Jesse
- Daniel James Hodd – Young Solomon
- Kimberly JaJuan – Abishag
- Dylan Lovett – Young Absalom

== Critical response ==
The 1997 debut concert performance provoked a mixed review by critics.

The New York Times' Ben Brantley wrote "the show is sober, respectful, packed with enough information for a month of Bible-study classes and, on its own terms, most carefully thought out, with pop equivalents of operatic motifs and exotic folkloric touches a la Borodin. Yet while the well-sung cast... have been painstakingly polished, the show, at two hours and 45 minutes, just can't help being a Goliath of a yawn."Variety wrote the show "showcases Menken's first-rate abilities as a pop craftsman", but deemed it "unrelentingly serious-minded and devoid of the wit that Menken brought to previous projects". In 2011, Express described it as a "theatre flop" which was "panned by critics".

The Los Angeles Times deemed the "benediction" a "nine-performance excuse for a CD and a possible (but I wouldn't bet on it) tryout for a full production", and felt it "confuses banality with dignity, bombast with piety...an ambitious and derivative example of the it's-so-loud-and-humorless-it-must-be-art style, the dull but earnest offspring of “Jesus Christ, Superstar” and “Les Miserables". The newspaper felt it was an "effort to deflect the inevitable sniping about the Mickey Mouseification of Broadway".

Regarding criticism of the show, Rice commented "we felt we'd been commissioned to write it as an oratorio, and still hoped it would be performed as such in Israel... we should have emphasized that more to avoid being judged primarily as a Broadway show." In retrospect, he felt they should have either produced it as a full-fledged Broadway show, or perform it as a straight concert in a different venue. In 2005, Menken spoke to British music journalist Edward Seckerson about the show as part of a career retrospective for the radio show Stage and Screen.
