= Cosette =

Cosette Pontmercy
- Les Misérables character
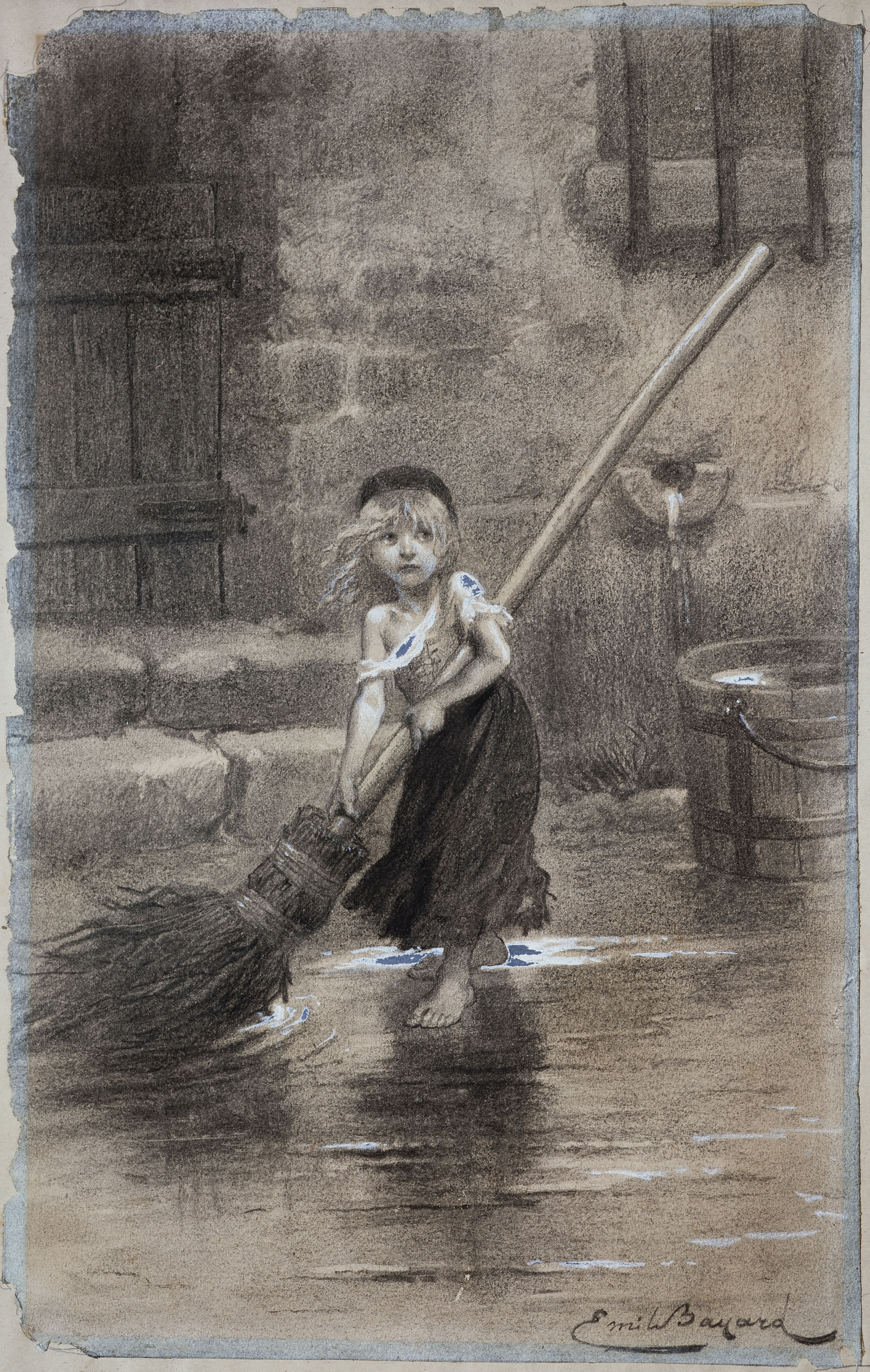
- Illustration of Cosette in the Thénardiers' inn at Montfermeil depicted by Émile Bayard (1837–1891).
- Created by: Victor Hugo

In-universe information
- Full name: Euphrasie
- Aliases: Ursule or Ursula; the Lark; Mademoiselle Lanoire or Lenoire; Madame Pontmercy; Cosette Fauchelevent
- Nicknames: Cosette, Alouette
- Gender: Female
- Family: Fantine (mother); Jean Valjean (adoptive father); Félix Tholomyès (biological father)
- Spouse: Marius Pontmercy
- Relatives: Georges Pontmercy (father-in-law); Monsieur Gillenormand (grandfather-in-law)
- Religion: Roman Catholic
- Nationality: French
- Born: 1816

Cosette (French pronunciation: [kɔzɛt]) is a fictional character in the 1862 novel Les Misérables by Victor Hugo and its many adaptations of the story for stage, film, and television. Cosette's birth name, Euphrasie, is only mentioned briefly. As the orphaned child of an unmarried mother deserted by her father, Victor Hugo never gives her a surname. In the course of the novel, she is mistakenly identified as Ursule, Lark, or Mademoiselle Lanoire.

She is the daughter of Fantine, a working woman who leaves her to be looked after by the Thénardiers, who exploit and victimise her. Rescued by Jean Valjean, who raises Cosette as if she were his own daughter, she grows up in a convent school. She falls in love with Marius Pontmercy, a young lawyer. Valjean's struggle to protect her while disguising his past drives much of the plot until he recognizes "that this child had a right to know life before renouncing it"—and he must allow her romantic attachment to Marius to blossom.

== In the novel ==
=== Early life ===
Euphrasie (a name from Greek Ευφράσια, 'good cheer, joy'), nicknamed Cosette (lit. 'little thing') by her mother, is the illegitimate daughter of Fantine and Félix Tholomyès, a rich student. She is born in Paris c. 1816. Tholomyès abandons Fantine, who leaves three-year-old Cosette with the Thénardiers at their inn in Montfermeil, paying them to care for her child while she works in the city of Montreuil-sur-Mer. Unbeknownst to Fantine, the Thénardiers abuse Cosette while she is under their care. They beat and starve her and force her to perform heavy labor in the inn. Under the Thénardiers' care she is described as "thin and pale", wears rags for clothing, and has chilblains on her hands as well as bruised and reddened skin. She is forced to go barefoot in winter. The narrator also says that "fear was spread all over her".

While Fantine is in the hospital, the mayor of Montreuil-sur-Mer—Jean Valjean masquerading as "Madeleine" to avoid revealing that he is a paroled convict—vows to retrieve Cosette for her. Although Fantine dies before seeing her daughter, Valjean becomes determined to look after the young girl.

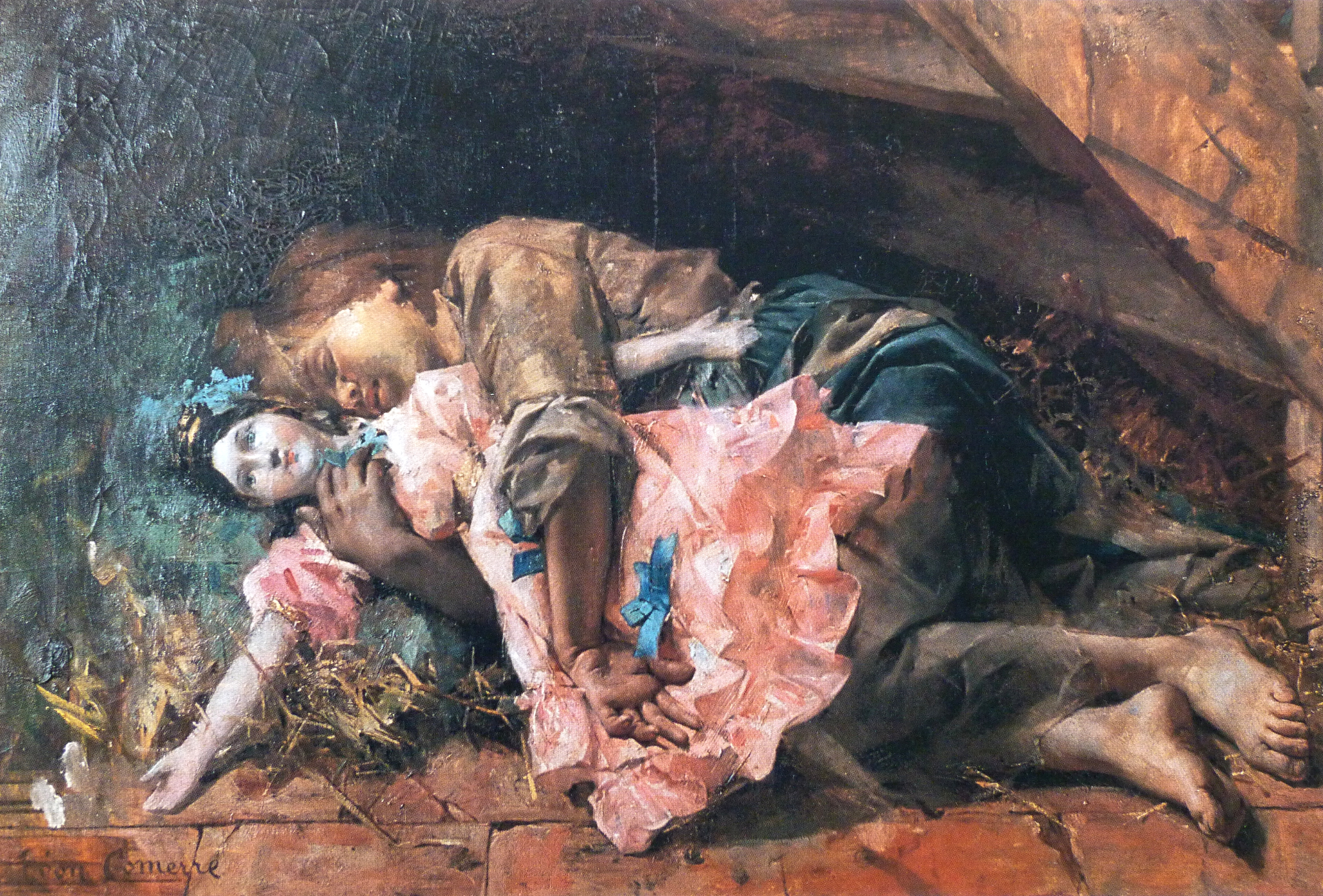
Cosette with her doll, painting by Léon Comerre (1850–1916)

When he arrives in Montfermeil on Christmas Eve, Valjean finds Cosette fetching a pail of water and accompanies her back to the inn, where he witnesses her mistreatment by the Thénardiers as well as the unkindnesses of their daughters Éponine and Azelma. Valjean leaves the inn and returns with an expensive new doll which he offers to Cosette. At first reluctant, Cosette joyfully accepts it, which infuriates Thénardier; Éponine and Azelma become jealous.

The next morning, Christmas Day, Valjean informs the Thénardiers that he has come to take Cosette with him. Madame Thénardier immediately agrees but Thénardier pretends affection for Cosette and acts reluctant. Valjean pays 1500 francs to settle Fantine's debts and leaves with Cosette. Thénardier tries to swindle more money out of Valjean by saying that he has changed his mind and wants Cosette back, informing Valjean that Cosette's mother had entrusted her to his care and he cannot release her without a note from her mother. Valjean, agreeing with him, hands him a letter signed by Fantine. Thénardier then attempts to order Valjean to return Cosette or to pay a thousand crowns, but Valjean ignores him and leaves with Cosette.

=== Paris ===
Valjean takes Cosette to Paris, where they lodge at Gorbeau House; Valjean begins her education. When Inspector Javert discovers Valjean's whereabouts, he and Cosette must flee. Valjean climbs over a wall and they find themselves in a garden attached to a convent. The gardener Fauchelevent recognizes Valjean as the man who rescued him years earlier and agrees to shelter them. Valjean poses as Fauchelevent's brother and says he is Cosette's grandfather. They live peacefully in the convent for many years as Valjean works with Fauchelevent and Cosette attends the convent school. Over time, she appears to have no recollection of her childhood before arriving at the convent. As Cosette matures, beautiful and healthy, with chestnut hair, beautiful eyes, rosy cheeks, pale skin, and a radiant smile, Valjean realizes it would be unfair to allow her to become a nun without having experienced the outside world which a cloistered nun must renounce.

In a later chapter, Cosette eventually remembers her childhood—praying for the mother she never knew; the two ugly Thénardiers, and fetching them water somewhere "very far from Paris". In the same chapter, she asks Valjean about her mother, but he does not answer her question. When Cosette has a dream about her mother as an angel, she remarks that her mother must have been a saint. Valjean replies, "through martyrdom".

=== Relationship with Marius Pontmercy ===
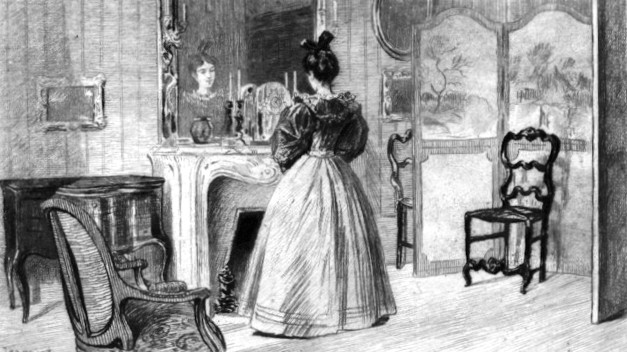
The adult Cosette, by Pierre-Georges Jeanniot, 1887 edition

Marius sees Cosette for the first time in the Luxembourg Garden. She is fourteen years old, and fresh out of the convent, so he pays little attention to her. After a few months, Marius notices her and sees that she has grown to be an extremely beautiful young woman. Soon Cosette and Marius exchange glances and fall in love. Valjean notices how attentive Marius is to their movements. When he learns that Marius has followed them home and inquired about them, he quickly moves to a more obscure address with Cosette.

Marius spots Cosette again during a charitable visit she and Valjean make to the Thénardiers at Gorbeau House, directly next door to Marius. He asks Éponine to find her address for him, and she reluctantly agrees. After many weeks, Éponine takes Marius to Cosette's new address in order to please Marius. Marius watches Cosette for a few nights before approaching her. When Cosette and Marius finally meet again in the garden, they confess their mutual love, share their first kiss, and introduce themselves. They continue to meet in secret.

Éponine prevents Thénardier, Patron-Minette and Brujon from robbing Valjean and Cosette's house. The same night, Cosette informs Marius that she and Valjean will be departing for England soon. This news devastates them both, because it will mean the end of their relationship. Marius briefly attempts to obtain money and permission to marry from his grandfather to circumvent this issue. Their discussion dissolves into a heated argument stemming from the grandfather's suggestion to "Make her [his] mistress", and Marius storms out.

The next day, Éponine (now dressed as a boy) finds Valjean in an embankment in the Champ de Mars and anonymously throws him a note, which tells him to "move". Valjean considers this in horror for a few days, then informs Cosette they will move to their other house and will be in England in a week. Cosette quickly writes a letter to Marius with this information. She catches sight of Éponine through the gate and asks the "workman" to deliver the letter to Marius. Éponine accepts the letter, but does not deliver it.

Several nights later, Marius is led to the barricades by Éponine, in hope that they will die together. After being fatally shot, Éponine reveals this to Marius and gives him Cosette's letter before she dies. Marius writes a farewell letter to Cosette, which is delivered to Valjean by Gavroche. Valjean reads Marius' farewell letter and decides to follow Marius to the barricades. After the battle is over, he takes Marius' unconscious body through the sewers. After, quite literally, dragging Marius through quicksand in the sewer, Valjean finally manages to get Marius through the sewers alive. He is let out by Thénardier, who has a government key and does not recognize him, simply assuming him to be an assassin who killed Marius.

At the exit, he is confronted by Javert, who had pursued Thénardier there and was watching the exit in hopes of catching him. Javert helps Valjean return Marius to his grandfather's house, and Valjean requests to be brought home to say goodbye to Cosette before being sent back to the galleys. Javert allows it, and when Valjean instinctively looks out the window, Javert is gone. It is later revealed that Valjean sparing Javert's life at the barricade had caused a moral paradox and that Javert had committed suicide by jumping into the Seine. After Marius' six-month recovery from his wounds, he is reunited with Cosette.

=== Wedding and afterwards ===
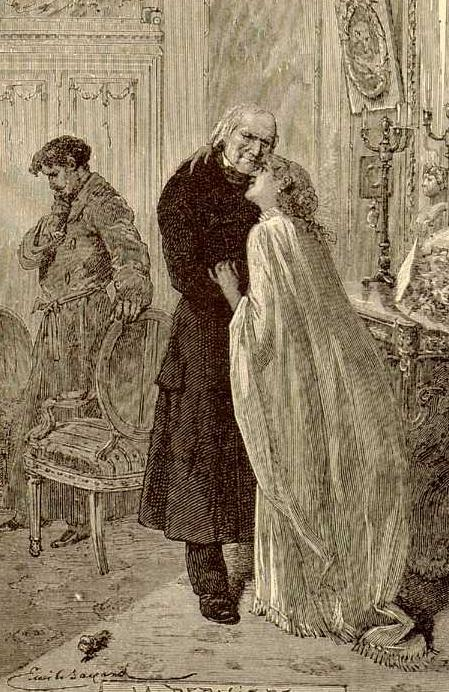
Cosette bids farewell to Valjean after her marriage

On February 16, 1833, Marius and Cosette marry. The next morning, Valjean tells Marius of his criminal past. Marius asks him to leave him and Cosette. He then allows Valjean to visit her each evening, but makes those visits increasingly difficult until Valjean stops coming. While Marius, assuming the worst about Valjean's character, searches for the real origin of Cosette's money, Valjean loses the will to live and becomes bedridden. When Marius learns from Thénardier that he owes his life to Valjean, Marius and Cosette go to Valjean, find him on his deathbed, and reconcile with him. As Marius looks on, Valjean tells Cosette the story of her mother Fantine and how he came to be her guardian. Valjean dies peacefully.

== Character role ==
Critics have often considered Cosette to be something of an empty figure, with no real independent character apart from the role she plays in the lives of others: as an innocent, hopeless child-victim to be exploited (for the Thénardiers); a daughter to be protected (for Fantine and Valjean); and an object of adoration (for Marius). Stephanie Barbé Hammer writes that "Having served her function as a paternalizing figure, Cosette grows up into a silent, beautiful cipher". She has the same, but reverse, role as an object of jealousy and hatred for the villainous characters. As Kathryn M. Grossman remarks, she brings out the "hatred of humanity" that is typical of Hugo's villains. When Madame Thénardier sees that the grown-up Cosette has become a "well-off and radiant young woman, Madame Thénardier responds viscerally, 'I'd like to kick open her belly'."

Cosette is also portrayed as largely sexless. Mario Vargas Llosa says of her relationship to Marius,

Now the love between these two is completely ethereal; the sex drive has been surgically removed so that their relationship can be purely one of feeling. Before the wedding the young people exchange one kiss, which is not repeated because, as the narrator says, neither Marius nor Cosette was aware of the existence of carnal desire.... The dialogue between these two virtuous lovers is as unreal as their amorous behavior. For this reason, the episodes where the two lovers talk to each other are the most artificial moments in the novel.

However, in a novel of symbolism and metaphor, Cosette may also be seen as a symbol of hope in the world of Les Misérables, representing the rise of the oppressed and abused from darkness to a bright future. She is the primary motivation for several characters in the novel to lift themselves out of darkness, regardless of whether or not they succeed. For this reason the picture of her sweeping the inn in the evening is often the image most associated as being singularly representative of the main themes of the book, and is used frequently on the cover.

== Name ==
The origins of Cosette are unclear. The leading theory is that Hugo derived Cosette from the French word chosette, meaning 'little thing'. Another theory is that it is derived from the Greek masculine name Nicholas, itself meaning 'victory of the people' or 'victorious'.

== Adaptations ==
Since the original publication of Les Misérables in 1862, the character of Cosette has been included in many adaptations in various media, including books, films, musicals, plays and games, most notably in the 2007 anime Les Misérables: Shōjo Cosette, in which she rather than Valjean is the central character.

== In the musical ==
In the stage musical based on the novel, Cosette is a principal character played by two actresses, a younger female for Montfermeil in 1823 and an older female for Paris in 1832. Hers is considered a soprano role. Her role as an adolescent is condensed while her joy in singing and reading is only implied (specifically in "Castle on the Cloud"). Many other details of her character including her passionate nature ("A Heart Full of Love") are similarly portrayed by implication in the songs she sings.

Other aspects were fully omitted including the conversation between Valjean and Cosette as he helps her carry the water bucket, their stay at Gorbeau House, their avoidance of Javert and their arrival at the Petit-Picpus convent, much of which were later reintroduced in the 2012 film adaptation. The musical also condenses the time between the wedding of Cosette and Marius and their visit to the dying Valjean.

Onstage, the role has been played by many actresses including Rebecca Caine, Ali Ewoldt, Celia Graham, Lucie Jones, Judy Kuhn, and Marina Prior.

== List of actors who have played Cosette ==
Actress	Role	Year(s)	Version	Medium
Sandra Milovanoff	Cosette / Fantine	1925	1925 silent film	Film
Josseline Gaël	Cosette	1934	1934 film	Film
Rochelle Hudson	Cosette	1935	1935 film	Film
Marilyn Knowlden	Young Cosette	1935	1935 film	Film
Debra Paget	Cosette	1952	1952 film	Film
Béatrice Altariba	Cosette	1958	1958 film	Film
Judy Kuhn	Cosette	1987	Original Broadway production	Broadway
Donna Vivino	Young Cosette	1987	Original Broadway production	Broadway
Eden Riegel	Young Cosette	1990–1991	Original Broadway production	Broadway
Lacey Chabert	Young Cosette	1992–1993	Original Broadway production	Broadway
Lea Michele	Young Cosette	1995	Original Broadway production	Broadway
Alicia Morton	Young Cosette	1996–1999	Original Broadway production	Broadway
Janel Parrish	Young Cosette	1996	Original Broadway production	Broadway
Claire Danes	Cosette	1998	1998 film	Film
Ali Ewoldt	Cosette	2006–2007	Broadway revival	Broadway
Amanda Seyfried	Cosette	2012	2012 film musical	Film
Isabelle Allen	Young Cosette	2012	2012 film musical	Film
Samantha Hill	Cosette	2014–2015	Broadway revival	Broadway

== See also ==
- Cosette (as given name)
