= Finn Mac Cool (novel) =

1994 novel by Morgan Llywelyn

- First edition (publ. Forge Books); Cover art by Jim Fitzpatrick
- Author: Morgan Llywelyn
- Publisher: Forge Books
- Publication date: March 1, 1994
- ISBN: 0-312-85476-5

Finn Mac Cool is a 1994 novel by Irish-American author Morgan Llywelyn. It is based on the Fenian Cycle about the Irish hero Finn Mac Cool and the fianna. Terri Windling described it as "a skilfully crafted Irish novel [...] in the shadowy realm between history and mythology".
