= Red Branch (novel) =

1989 novel by Morgan Llywelyn

- First edition cover
- Author: Morgan Llywelyn
- Publisher: William Morrow & Company
- Publication date: March 21, 1989
- ISBN: 0-804-10591-X

Red Branch (ISBN 080410591X, 1989), by the Irish-American author Morgan Llywelyn, is a novel about the life of the Irish hero Cú Chulainn. Red Branch novelizes several stories from the Ulster Cycle of Irish mythology, including the well-known Táin Bó Cúailnge (Cattle Raid of Cooley), and Deirdre (of the Sorrows).
