= Linda Balgord =

American actress (1960–2024)

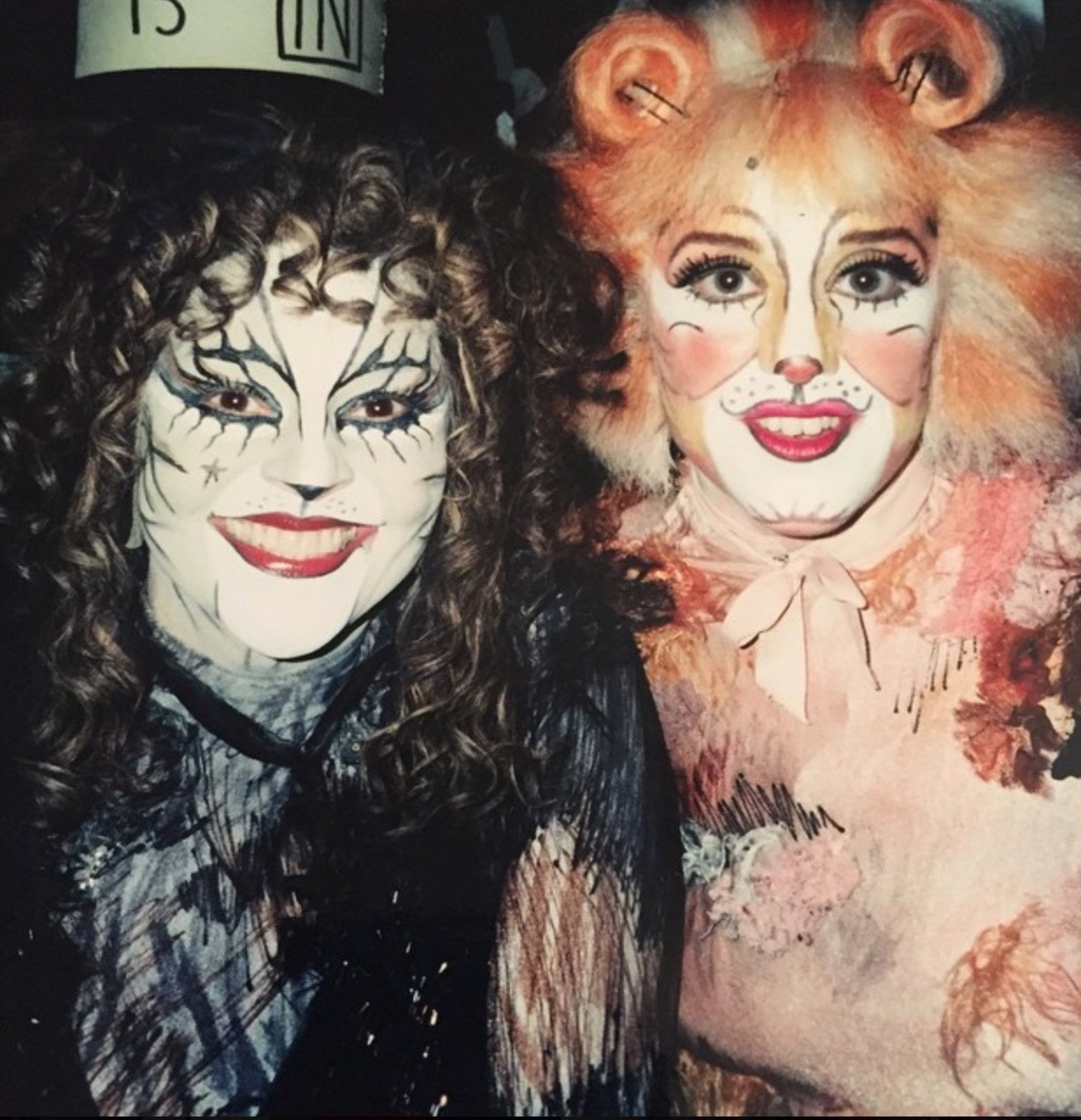
- Balgord (left) as Grizabella with Sharon Wheatley in Cats, 2000
- Born: February 18, 1960; New Lisbon, Wisconsin, U.S.
- Died: March 5, 2024 (aged 64); Naples, Florida, U.S.
- Education: Viterbo University; University of Wisconsin-Milwaukee (MFA)
- Occupation: Actress
- Spouse: Andrew Fenton (m. 1993)

Linda Balgord (February 18, 1960 – March 5, 2024) was an American Broadway actress and singer, most notable for playing Norma Desmond in the 1996 United States tour of Andrew Lloyd Webber's musical Sunset Boulevard, being the last actress to portray Grizabella in the original Broadway run of Cats, and originating the role of Queen Elizabeth I in The Pirate Queen on Broadway. She also played the role of Madame Giry in Andrew Lloyd Webber's The Phantom of the Opera, in both the restaged North American tour and on Broadway.

== Early life ==
Linda Balgord was born on February 18, 1960. A native of New Lisbon, Wisconsin, and an aspiring actress since grade school, Balgord graduated from New Lisbon High School in 1978. She was a 1982 graduate of Viterbo University in La Crosse, Wisconsin, and she received a Master of Fine Arts, Acting, from the University of Wisconsin-Milwaukee.

== Career ==
From 1982 to 1984, between her undergraduate graduation and beginning graduate studies, Balgord acted at the Fireside Theatre in Fort Atkinson, Wisconsin. Soon after she finished her graduate studies, Balgord went to Chicago and began acting at the Goodman Theater in Sunday in the Park With George. She moved to New York in 1990 and after five months gained the lead role in a two-year national tour of Aspects of Love. Her Broadway debut came in Passion.

Andrew Lloyd Webber personally chose Balgord to portray Norma Desmond in Sunset Boulevard.

=== Awards ===
Balgord received the Distinguished Young Alumna Award from Viterbo University in 1990. She received a Helen Hayes Non-Resident Acting award in 1993 and a Helen Hayes Resident Acting award in 1999. She also received a Drama Desk nomination for Outstanding featured actress in The Pirate Queen for her role as Queen Elizabeth I.

== Personal life and death ==
Balgord married stage manager Andrew Fenton in July 1993. They met when both worked on the production of Aspects of Love in Toronto.

Linda Balgord died in Naples, Florida, on March 5, 2024, at the age of 64.
