= Bard: The Odyssey of the Irish =

1984 novel by Morgan Llywelyn

- First edition
- Author: Morgan Llywelyn
- Cover artist: Jim Fitzpatrick
- Language: English
- Genre: Historical fantasy
- Publisher: Houghton Mifflin
- Publication date: 1984
- Publication place: United States
- Media type: Print (hardback & paperback)
- Pages: 466 pp
- ISBN: 0-395-35352-1
- OCLC: 10711745

Bard: The Odyssey of the Irish is a 1984 historical fantasy novel by Morgan Llywelyn. It depicts the migration of Galicians to Ireland, led by Amergin the bard and the Sons of the Mil. It is loosely based on the Early Irish Lebor Gabála Érenn or The Book of Invasions found in several medieval manuscripts.

== Plot summary ==
Official tagline: "The sweeping historical tale of the coming of the Irish to Ireland, and of the men and women who made the Emerald Isle their own."

In the 4th century BC a group of Gaelic speaking people living in the northwest of Iberia, the Galicians, are waning in prosperity. A group of Phoenician traders unexpectedly arrives and gives hope to the tribe.

The story follows Amergin, druid and chief bard of the Galicians, and his brothers; Éremón, Colptha, Éber Finn, Donn, and Ír - all sons of Milesios. After years of declining prosperity, the Gaelicians hope that the Phoenician traders, led by Age-Nor, will help bring them back. Unfortunately, neither side has anything of much worth to trade. At a reception in the Heroes' Hall, Age-Nor is attacked by Ír, while Milesios is asleep and unaware. Amergin uses his bardic talent to entrance Ír, thus saving Age-Nor.

Later in the novel, Age-Nor rewards Amergin, despite the bard's vehement protests, by giving him a servant, a shipwright named Sakkar, and regaling him with a tale of a fabled land to the north, Ierne. After a series of mishaps and bad decisions, it is eventually decided that a group of the Gaelicians, led by the Sons of the Mil, will settle this land. The tribe builds a series of ships with the help of Sakkar, and set sail.

When they arrive on Ierne, they are confronted by the mysterious Tuatha Dé Danann, People of the Goddess Danu. After a battle, the Dananns vanish with no trace, leaving Ierne for the Milesians after Éiru (A Goddess of the Tuatha De Dannan) hands over Ireland to Amergin for it was foretold.
