= Coraline (musical) =

- Off-Broadway promotional art
- Music: Stephin Merritt
- Lyrics: Stephin Merritt
- Book: David Greenspan
- Basis: Coraline by Neil Gaiman
- Premiere: June 1, 2009
- Productions: 2009 Off-Broadway; 2011 San Francisco; 2013 Edmonton, Canada; 2014 Chicago; 2015 Charlotte; 2024 Omaha

Coraline is a musical with music and lyrics by Stephin Merritt and a book by David Greenspan. It is based on the 2002 novella of the same name by Neil Gaiman. The story follows Coraline Jones, a young girl who discovers a parallel world beyond a secret door in her new home. The world has everything Coraline dreams of, but hides an ominous secret.

Coraline premiered off-Broadway in June 2009, four months after the film adaptation's release.

== Original production ==
Coraline was commissioned in 2004 by St. Ann Warehouse in association with Meet the Composer Commissioning Music/USA. The musical approached completion in 2008, but was not premiered until the following year.

Coraline began previews on May 8, 2009 at the Lucille Lortel Theatre. It premiered on June 1, 2009 and was originally scheduled to close on June 20. Due to popular demand, its run was extended first to July 5, then July 7. Coraline was produced by MCC Theater in association with True Love Productions. It was the first musical to be produced by MCC Theater.

The musical is "wildly unconventional", according to world-premiere director Leigh Silverman. West-coast premiere director Bill English describes the music as "odd," with pieces ending in the middles of phrases. The only instruments used in the musical are pianos, both traditional and toy varieties. The musical also calls for two prepared pianos.

The original production's cast was similarly unconventional, with 55-year-old Jayne Houdyshell as nine-year-old Coraline and librettist David Greenspan as the Other Mother. The cast also featured Julian Fleisher as Cat, Francis Jue as Father and Miss Forcible, January LaVoy as Mother and Miss Spink, Elliot Vallar as Mr Bobo, and William Youmans as Other Father.

Ghostlight Records released an original cast album in February 2010.

=== Other productions of note ===
The West Coast premiere of Coraline played from November 16, 2010 to January 15, 2011 in San Francisco, produced by The SF Playhouse. The Midwest premiere played from August 8, 2014 to September 6, 2014 in Chicago, produced by Black Button Eyes Productions.

Coraline also premiered internationally in Canada during the Edmonton Fringe Festival, from August 15, 2013 to August 25, 2013. It was produced by Impossible Mongoose Productions.

== Casts ==
| Role | 2009 Off-Broadway World Premiere, MCC Theater | 2011 West Coast Premiere, San Francisco Playhouse | Canadian Premiere, 2013 Edmonton Fringe | Chicago Premiere, 2014 City Lit Theater |
|---|---|---|---|---|
| Coraline | Jayne Houdyshell | Maya Donato; Julia Blanoff | Laena Anderson | Sheridan Singleton |
| Mother | January LaVoy | Stacy Ross | Rebecca Merkley | Jennifer T. Grubb |
| Father | Francis Jue | Jackson Davis | Adam Sanders | Justin Kimrey |
| Miss Spink/Other Miss Spink | January LaVoy | Susi Damilano | Rebecca Merkley | Caitlin Jackson |
| Miss Forcible/Other Miss Forcible | Francis Jue | Maureen McVerry | Adam Sanders | Kevin Bishop |
| Mr Bobo | Elliot Vallar | Brian Degan Scott | Oscar Derkx | Jeff Bouthiette |
| Cat | Julian Fleisher | Brian Yates Barber | Graham Mothersill | Kevin Webb |
| Other Mother | David Greenspan | Stacy Ross | Kayla Gorman | Ryan Lanning |
| Other Father | William Youmans | Jackson Davis | Darcy Robinson | Justin Kimrey |
| Other Mr Bobo | Elliot Vallar | Brian Degan Scott | Oscar Derkx | Kevin Bishop |
| Ensemble | Julian Fleisher; Francis Jue; January LaVoy; Elliot Vallar; William Youmans | Brian Yates Barber; Suso Damilano; Jackson Davis; Maureen McVerry; Brian Degan Scott | Oscar Derkx; Rebecca Merkley; Darcy Robinson; Adam Sanders | Jeff Bouthiette; Jennifer T. Grubb; Caitlin Jackson; Justin Kimrey |

== Musical numbers ==
1. Overture – Other Father; Mr. Bobo; Cat; Mother; Father;
2. A New House – Coraline; Cat
3. I Am Miss Spink (And I Am Miss Forcible) – Mother; Father
4. A Mouse Circus – Coraline; Mr. Bobo; Ensemble
5. Mum and Dad – Coraline; Father; Mother
6. At the Other End – Cat; Coraline
7. Song of the Rats – Ensemble
8. When We Were Young and Trod the Boards – Father; Mother
9. Fluorescent Green Gloves – Coraline
10. Welcome Home – Other Mother; Other Father; Ensemble
11. A Lot of Noise – Ensemble
12. Song of the Rats – Ensemble
13. Theatre Is Fun – Father; Mother
14. Stay with Us – Other Mother; Other Father; Ensemble
15. The Ballad of The Wasps – Coraline
16. O What a Lovely Trip – Father; Mother; Coraline
17. Go to Sleep – Other Mother
18. We Were Children Once – Ensemble
19. When You're A Cat – Cat
20. Song of the Rats – Ensemble
21. Recollections – Other Father; Mr. Bobo; Father
22. Whatever You Want – Mr. Bobo
23. Song of the Rats – Ensemble
24. The World Goes Flat – Ensemble
25. I Saw a Show on Telly Once – Coraline
26. Falling... Falling... – Other Mother; Ensemble
27. One Long Fairytale – Other Mother; Cat; Father; Mother; Mr. Bobo; Other Father; Ensemble

== Critical response ==
Many critics found the show lacked suspense and affect. Ben Brantley described the original off-Broadway production in The New York Times as "droll, dry, and very cerebral." In subsequent runs, critics echoed such negative criticisms. Robert Hurwitt wrote in the San Francisco Chronicle, "Greenspan's make-believe approach undercuts the tale's suspense." Kerry Reid wrote in the Chicago Tribune, "There needs to be a greater sense of clammy danger... as the shadows fall over the world... Without it, we never quite identify with Coraline's growing maturity."

Critics also found the quirky musical score and instrumentation too indistinct and unmemorable. Matthew Murray wrote in TalkingBroadway.com that the show lacks "musical necessity" and goes on to say, "It's not just that the songs give you nothing to take away, it's that they take in nothing to give you." More generally, Toby Zinman wrote on BroadStreetReview.com that attendees may find "the songs were unmusical."

While the show received generally negative-to-mixed reviews, critics remained supportive of its creative team. Noting the strength of Gaiman's novel, Greenspan's inventive theatrical work, and Merritt's quirky, esoteric musicianship, David Rooney wrote in Variety, "Whether or not the musical-theater crowd warms to this wildly unconventional piece, it succeeds fully in harnessing the essence of three distinctive talents." Additionally, Stephen Merritt received the Obie Award for Design/Music for Coraline in 2010.
