= Grania: She-King of the Irish Seas =

1986 novel by Morgan Llywelyn

- First edition
- Author: Morgan Llywelyn
- Cover artist: Hector Garrido
- Language: English
- Genre: Historical novel
- Publisher: Crown
- Publication date: 6 April 1986
- Publication place: Ireland
- Media type: Print (Hardback & Paperback)
- Pages: 437 pp (Hardback)
- ISBN: 0-517-55951-X (Hardback)
- OCLC: 12970461
- Dewey Decimal: 813/.54 19
- LC Class: PS3562.L94 G73 1986

Grania: She-King of the Irish Seas is a 1986 historical novel about Grace O'Malley (Irish: Gráinne Ní Mháille), the so-called "Sea Queen of Connemara", by American-born Irish author Morgan Llywelyn. Llywelyn's novel is a heavily fictionalized account of O'Malley's life, the author having created characters as needed for the plot of the story. The novel was the basis for the 2007 Broadway musical The Pirate Queen.
