= Ali Ewoldt =

American theatre actress

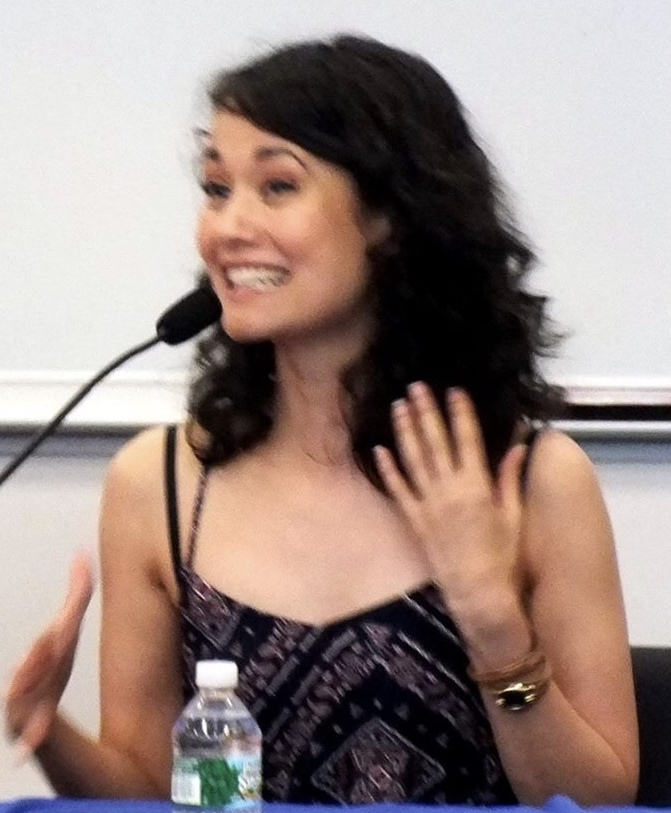
- Ewoldt with at the Filipino American National Historical Society Conference in New York City, June 2016
- Born: October 6, 1982 (age 43); Chicago, Illinois, U.S.
- Education: Yale University
- Occupations: Singer, actress
- Years active: 2006–present
- Website: aliewoldt.com

Ali Ewoldt (born October 6, 1982) is an American theatre actress, who made her Broadway debut in the Les Misérables revival in 2006, playing Cosette. She has also performed on national and international tours and in U.S. regional theatre. She became well known as the first Asian-American actress to star as Christine Daaé in The Phantom of the Opera on Broadway.

== Life and career ==
Ewoldt was born in Chicago to a Filipina mother and a Euro-American father and raised in Pleasantville, New York. She performed in a nearby regional theater as a child and in musical theatre in high school. She earned a Helen Hayes High School Theater Award for supporting actress for her portrayal of Tuptim in Pleasantville High School's 1999 production of "The King and I". She would go on to play the same role on Broadway in 2015's Lincoln Center production, alongside Tony award-winning performer Kelli O'Hara. She later graduated cum laude from Yale University.

Ewoldt performed the role of Princess Jasmine in Disneyland, and she also worked at the Tokyo Disney theme park before appearing in a U.S. tour of Les Misérables. She began the tour as a member of the ensemble, and later understudied the role of Cosette, before she finally received the role during the tour. She then played Cosette in the Les Misérables Broadway revival in 2006.

From 2009 to 2011, Ewoldt starred in North American tour and in the 50th anniversary international tour of West Side Story. In 2015, she played Tuptim in a tour of The King and I, where she "received the loudest applause from the audience after she sang her stirring, operatic interpretation of 'My Lord and Master'". Other regional theatre roles include Luisa in The Fantasticks at the Mt. Washington Valley Theatre Co.

In 2015, she appeared in The King and I revival on Broadway.

On June 13, 2016, she joined the Broadway company of The Phantom of the Opera as the show's first Asian-American Christine.

Ewoldt sang the role of Briella (Dorabella) in Salastina's world premiere of Vid Guerrerio's production of OC Fan Tutte for Salastina in Los Angeles, an updated English-language version of Mozart's 1790 opera Così fan tutte.

== Performance credits ==
| Year | Show | Role | Theater | Category |
|---|---|---|---|---|
| 2006 | Les Misérables | Cosette | - | US tour |
| 2006–2007 | Les Misérables | Cosette | Broadhurst Theatre | Broadway |
| 2008 | West Side Story | Maria | Benedum Center | Regional |
| 2009 | Early to Bed | Lily-Ann | McGinn/Cazale Theatre | Off-Broadway |
| 2009 | West Side Story | Maria | - | World tour |
| 2010 | Resurrection | Ensemble | Harold Clurman Theater | The Pearl Project Festival |
| 2010–2011 | West Side Story | Maria | - | US tour |
| 2012 | Carousel | Carrie Pipperidge | Peter Jay Sharp Theater | Symphony Space |
| 2013 | The Fantasticks | Luisa | Jerry Orbach Theater | Off-Broadway |
| 2013 | West Side Story | Maria | The Muny | Regional |
| 2013, 2014 | A Christmas Carol | Fan/Mrs. Bonds | McCarter Theatre Center | Regional |
| 2014 | West Side Story | Maria | Century II Concert Hall | Regional |
| 2015–2016 | The King and I | Ensemble, Tuptim u/s | Vivian Beaumont Theatre | Broadway |
| 2016 | The Secret Garden | Rose Lennox | Lucille Lortel Theatre | Off-Broadway |
| 2016 | The King and I | Tuptim | Lyric Opera of Chicago | Regional |
| 2016–2018 | The Phantom of the Opera | Christine Daaé | Majestic Theatre | Broadway |
| 2017 | A Funny Thing Happened on the Way to the Forum | Philia | The Muny | Regional |
| 2018 | The Secret Garden | Rose Lennox | Unknown | Lab |
| 2019 | Into the Woods | Cinderella | Patchogue Theatre | Regional |
| 2019 | 1776 | Martha Jefferson | The Muny | Regional |
| 2019 | Guys and Dolls | Sarah Brown | Wells Fargo Pavilion | Regional |
| 2021 | Chicago | Mary Sunshine | The Muny | Regional |
| 2022 | She Loves Me | Amalia Balash | Signature Theatre | Regional |
| 2022 | Chicago | Mary Sunshine | The Muny | Regional |
| 2023 | The Secret Garden | Rose Lennox u/s Lily Craven | Ahmanson Theatre | Pre-Broadway |
| 2024 | Natasha, Pierre & The; Great Comet of 1812 | Natasha Rostova | Pioneer Theatre Company | Regional |
| 2024 | Titanic | Madame Aubert | New York City Center | Encores! |

== See also ==
- Filipinos in the New York metropolitan area
