= Virginia Stage Company =

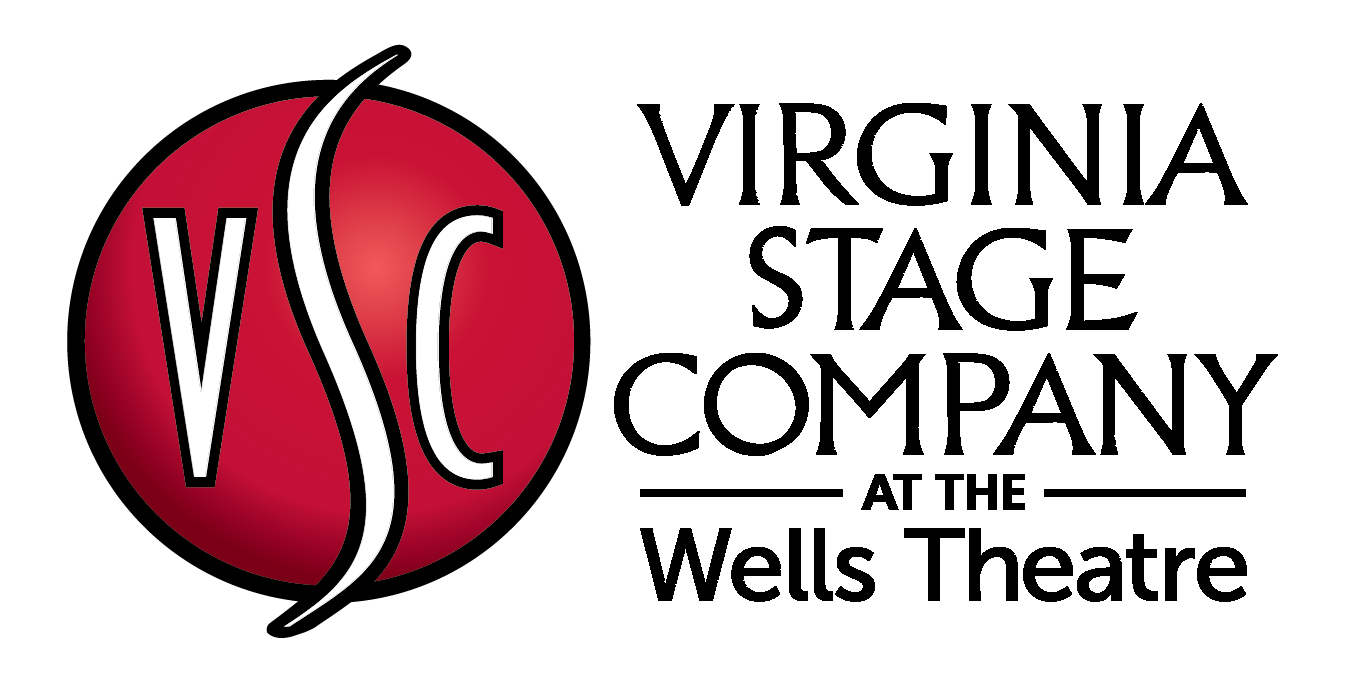

Virginia Stage Company (VSC) is a professional theater company located in Hampton Roads, Virginia. VSC presents locally produced plays for over 70,000 patrons a year both at the Wells Theatre in Norfolk, Virginia and throughout the community. A nonprofit theater, VSC has developed their "American Soil Series," a program that commissions plays of special regional interest, usually receiving their world premieres.

== History ==
The first Board of Trustees began the organization in 1968. At the time, it was called the "Norfolk Theatre Center", and the first performances were presented in a 120-seat space in the former public library building on Freemason Street. The Theatre Center later moved to a makeshift space under Chrysler Hall and became known as the Stage Downunder at Scope.

In the late 1970s, the board of trustees decided to develop a fully professional theatre. Adopting the name Virginia Stage Company, they hired the first professional staff in 1978 and began detailed planning with help from the National Foundation for the Expansion and Development of American Theatre. A search began for a space where a professional theatre could produce and perform a season from October to May. After looking at 49 spaces, they chose the Wells Theatre.

A public-private partnership at the Wells Theater began. The VSC Board obtained an option to purchase the remaining years on the lease. In October 1979, with $315,000 from the Norfolk Redevelopment and Housing Authority and $180,000 contributed and raised by the founding board of trustees, the lease was purchased, and VSC took possession of the Wells. Less than four months later, after a prodigious initial renovation, Virginia Stage Company opened their premiere season on February 7, 1980.

In September 2016, VSC has named Tom Quaintance its new producing artistic director, moving the theatre to a single leader model with Quaintance overseeing both financial and artistic operations. He succeeded former VSC leaders artistic director Chris Hanna and managing director Keith Stava. Previously, Quaintance served as artistic director of Cape Fear Regional Theatre in Fayetteville, North Carolina for 5 years.

== Main stage productions ==
Virginia Stage Company's seasons run from September to April and include six productions, five main season plays and one season extra. The company's repertoire includes Broadway hits such as The Wiz, Venus in Fur, A Streetcar Named Desire and Peter and the Starcatcher, locally written and produced plays such as I Sing the Rising Sea and The Hampton Years, and classics such as The Tempest and Oliver Twist.

== World premieres ==
2016 - Oliver Twist by Charles Dickens, Adapted by Patrick Mullins, with Music by Jake Hull
2016 - I Sing the Rising Sea, Book, Music, and Lyrics by Eric Schorr
2013 - Frog Kiss, Book & Lyrics by Charles Leipart, Music By Eric Schorr, Based on the novella The Frog Prince – A Fairy Tale for Consenting Adults by Stephen Mitchell
2013 - Swingtime Salute (on the deck of the Battleship Wisconsin), Book by Patrick Mullins, Music & Lyrics by various
2012 - The Comfort Team by Deborah Brevoort
2011 - SCKBSTD, A New Musical by Bruce Hornsby, Music & Lyrics by Bruce Hornsby, Lyrics by Chip deMatteo, Book by Clay McLeod Chapman
2010 - The New Pink by Chris Hanna
2009 - Alive and Well by Kenny Finkle
2009 - Line in the Sand by Chris Hanna
2007 - King Lear – The Storm At Home by Chris Hanna, based on William Shakespeare's King Lear
2006 - A Christmas Carol by Charles Dickens, Adapted by VSC
2005 - The Taste Test by Frank Higgins
1998 - Nobody Lonesome for Me by Lanie Robertson
1996 - Snapshots by Michael Scheman and David Stern, Music by Stephen Schwartz
1996 - A Christmas Carol by Charles Dickens, Adapted by David McCann
1989 - The Secret Garden by Frances Hodgson Burnett, Adapted by Marsha Norman, Lyrics by Lucy Simon
1988 - Fossey by Lois Meredith
1988 - Play Yourself by Harry Kondoleon
1987 - Haut Gout by Allen Havis
1986 - Wetter than Water by Deborah Pryor
1985 - Morocco by Alan Havis
1983 - Island by Peter Link, Brent Nicholson, Joe Bravco and Larry Rosler
1983 - High Rolling by Robert Litz
1983 - Tiovivo by Mary G. St. Cloud
1983 - The Hazard County Wonder by Bruce Payton
1982 - Therese Raquin by Stephen William
1982 - Leavings by Michael Richey
1982 - Whatever Become of Love? By Ed Meyerson
1981 - Hot Grog by Jim Wann & Bland Simpson

== Education and community engagement programs ==
Virginia Stage Company runs educational and community engagement initiatives.

=== Student matinees ===
Virginia Stage Company chooses productions that coordinate with school curricula. Students are provided significantly discounted tickets to attend student matinees. Standards of Learning based study guides are researched and created by the education team and provided to each teacher prior to attending the show. The directors, designers, and actors participate in a talk-back session with the students directly following each performance, giving students an opportunity to interact with the company.

=== In-school tours ===
VSC's touring productions last under forty-five minutes with a Q & A wrap-up to fit classroom schedule and include an online activity guide.

=== Workshops ===
VSC hosts workshops in stage combat, theatrical special effects, acting techniques, and script writing. In addition, they also offer master classes, during which local and national theater professionals work both one-on-one and in group settings with students.

=== Summer Theatre Camp ===
Working with professional theater artists, campers participate in two weeks of theatrical. Each day includes classes in acting, improvisation, storytelling techniques, creative writing, rehearsals, and special outings. At the end of camp, students showcase an original production for family and friends.
