= Lion of Ireland =

1980 novel by Morgan Llywelyn

The Lion of Ireland
- First edition
- Author: Morgan Llywelyn
- Language: English
- Genre: Historical fiction
- Publisher: Houghton Mifflin (US)
- Publication date: 1980
- Media type: Print (Hardback)
- Pages: 522
- ISBN: 0-395-28588-7
- OCLC: 5496902

Lion of Ireland, by the American-Irish author Morgan Llywelyn, is a novel about the life of the Irish hero and High King Brian Boru.

== Plot summary ==
The story begins with Brian as a child of around 8 or 9 and it ends with him as an 88-year-old man. The book shows his rise to power and his struggle to maintain it. His personal life is an important part of the plot, because Brian's war against Máel Mórda (leader of the Leinstermen) and Sihtric (king of Dublin) was to be inextricably connected with his complicated marital relations, in particular his marriage to Gormlaith, Máel Mórda's sister and Sihtric's mother, who had been in turn the wife of Amlaíb Cuarán, king of Dublin and York, then of Máel Sechnaill. Even though the book is based on a historical figure, most of it is fiction.

== Film adaptation ==
In 2003, Ireland based RiverFilms proposed a film adaptation of the book as Braveheart and El Cid meet The Vikings.

On March 4, 2019, it was announced in Deadline that a new movie adaptation was in the works. The series would be created by Irish author Michael Scott. The article was subsequently picked up the Sunday Times, and Irish Central who listed both Scott and BCDF Pictures as producers.
