= Pride of Lions (novel) =

First edition (publ. Forge Books) Cover art by Larry Selman

Pride of Lions (ISBN 9780812536508, 1996), by the American-Irish author Morgan Llywelyn, is a novel about the lives of the children of Irish hero and High King Brian Boru, particularly his son, Donough, after the Battle of Clontarf. It is a sequel to Lion of Ireland published in 1980.
