= Morgan Llywelyn =

American-Irish writer

- Born: Sally Snyder; December 3, 1937 (age 88); New York City, U.S.
- Occupation: Writer
- Writing career
- Period: 1978–present
- Genres: Historical fantasy, historical fiction
- Subject: Irish history

Morgan Llywelyn (born December 3, 1937) is an American-Irish historical interpretation author of historical and mythological fiction and historical non-fiction. Her interpretation of mythology and history has received several awards and has sold more than 40 million copies, and she herself is recipient of the 1999 Exceptional Celtic Woman of the Year Award from Celtic Women International.

== Biography ==
Llywelyn was born Sally Snyder in New York in 1937. She was the daughter of Joseph John (an attorney) and she attended high school in Dallas. In her teens, Llywelyn moved to the Dallas area, where she developed a love of horses. By the age of 16, Llywelyn was competing in professional horse shows across the United States. By age 18, she modeled for Neiman Marcus and Arthur Murray. After 15 years of experience as a horse trainer and instructor, she tried out for and narrowly missed making the 1976 United States Olympic Team in dressage. She was instead shortlisted, missing the cut off score by .05 percent.

With her mother's encouragement and a successfully published article on horse training, she refocused her efforts in tracing the Llywelyn family history and eventually made a career out of writing historical novels that allowed the exploration of her Celtic roots. In reference to this career change, Llywelyn had this to say:

I have a strong strain of Welsh on my mother's side, which does indeed go back to Llywelyn ap Iorwerth. And Llywelyn the Great! (We have the proven genealogy from the College of Heralds.) She was very proud of her royal Welsh connection. That is why she was so interested in genealogy in the first place, and inspired me to get involved as well ... leading in turn to THE WIND FROM HASTINGS. But both my parents were predominantly Irish – my father totally so – and I spent half the years of my childhood here. So I have always been much more interested in Ireland and its history and legends.

Llywelyn has received several awards for her works. She received the Novel of the Year Award from the National League of American Penwomen for her novel, The Horse Goddess, as well as the Woman of the Year Award from the Irish-American Heritage Committee for Bard: The Odyssey of the Irish. The latter award was presented to her by Ed Koch, then-mayor of New York City.

Although Llywelyn's grandparents have their roots in Ireland, it was only after the death of her parents and her husband in 1985 that she relocated to Ireland. Llywelyn now lives outside Dublin and has become an Irish citizen.

In 1990, Llywelyn began her focus on writing books geared for younger readers. These works started with Brian Boru: Emperor of the Irish, for which she won an Irish Children's Book Trust Bisto Award in 1991, and includes other titles, such as Strongbow: The Story of Richard and Aoife, for which she won a Bisto Award in the Historical Fiction category, 1993 and the Reading Association of Ireland Award, 1993, and Star Dancer, which departed from her usual Celtic topic and was centered on her experiences with dressage. Further works include The Vikings in Ireland, an exploration of when the Norsemen arrived in Ireland, and Pirate Queen, a younger reader's version of the story of Grace O'Malley, told through letters from Granuaile to her beloved son.

== Bibliography ==
=== Novels and short fiction collections ===
- 1978 The Wind from Hastings, Tor Books, ISBN 9781429983563
- 1980 Lion of Ireland, Forge Books, ISBN 9780765302571
- 1983 The Horse Goddess, Tor Books, ISBN 9781429983464
- 1984 Bard: The Odyssey of the Irish, Tor Books, ISBN 9780765334886
- 1984 Personal Habits, Doubleday
- 1986 Grania: She-King of the Irish Seas, Forge Books, ISBN 9781429920636
- 1987 Xerxes, Chelsea House Publications, ISBN 0877544476
- 1989 The Isles of the Blest, Olmstead Press, ISBN 9781587541131
- 1989 Red Branch, Ivy Books, ISBN 9780804105910
- 1990 Brian Boru: Emperor of the Irish, Tor Books, ISBN 9780812544619
- 1989 On Raven's Wing, Mandarin, ISBN 9780749302054
- 1991 Druids, Del Rey, ISBN 9780804108447
- 1992 The Last Prince of Ireland: A Novel, W. Morrow, ISBN 9780688107949
- 1992 O'Sullivan's March
- 1993 The Elementals, Tor Books, ISBN 9780312855680
- 1993 Star Dancer, The O'Brien Press, ISBN 9780862783310
- 1994 Finn Mac Cool, Forge Books, ISBN 9781250754226
- 1995 Cold Places
- 1995 Ireland: A Graphic History (with Michael Scott)
- 1995 Silverhand (Arcana, Book 1; with Michael Scott), Baen, ISBN 9780671877286
- 1996 19 Railway Street (with Michael Scott), Poolbeg Press Ltd, ISBN 9781853716423
- 1996 The Vikings in Ireland
- 1996 Strongbow: The Story of Richard & Aoife, The O'Brien Press, ISBN 9780862782740
- 1996 Silverlight (Arcana, Book 2; with Michael Scott)
- 1996 Pride of Lions
- 1998 1916, A Novel Of the Irish Rebellion, Forge Books, ISBN 9780765386144
- 1999 The Essential Library for Irish Americans
- 2000 Etruscans (with Michael Scott), Tor Books, ISBN 9780312875510
- 2000 A Pocket History of Irish Rebels
- 2000 The Earth Is Made Of Stardust, Borgo Press, ISBN 9781587151590
- 2001 1921, The War for Independence, Forge Books, ISBN 9780765326935
- 2001 Granuaile, The Pirate Queen (republished as Pirate Queen in 2006), The O'Brien Press, ISBN 9780862789749
- 2003 1949, The Irish Republic, Forge Books, ISBN 9780765381347
- 2005 1972, A Novel of Ireland's Unfinished Revolution, Forge Books, ISBN 9780765381330
- 2006 The Greener Shore: A Novel of the Druids of Hibernia, Del Rey, ISBN 9780345477675, 0345477677
- 2006 The Young Rebels, The O'Brien Press, ISBN 9780862785796
- 2006 The History of Irish Rebels
- 2006 The Vikings in Ireland
- 2008 1999 - A Novel of the Celtic Tiger and the Search for Peace, Forge Books, ISBN 9781429927062
- 2010 Brendan - The Remarkable Life and Voyage of Brendan of Clonfert, Forge Books, ISBN 9780312860998
- 2012 Cave of Secrets, The O'Brien Press, ISBN 9781847172075
- 2013 After Rome, Forge Books, ISBN 9781429987400
- 2014 1014: Brian Boru & the Battle for Ireland, Dover Publications, ISBN 9780486842004
- 2016 Only the Stones Survive, Forge Books, ISBN 9780765337931
- 2018 Drop by Drop, Tor Books, ISBN 9781250245311
- 2019 Step by Step
- 2020 Inch by Inch, Tor Books, ISBN 9781250245328
- 2021 Breath by Breath, Tor Books, ISBN 9780765388728

== Awards ==
Year	Title	Award
	Wind From Hastings	Alternate Main Selection, Doubleday Book Club; Used as a history text by Little Rock High School, Little Rock, Arkansas
	Lion of Ireland	New York Times Bestseller; Time Magazine Bestseller; Cultural Heritage Award, Washington, D.C.; Award of Merit, Texas Booksellers Assoc.; Literary Guild Selection
	The Horse Goddess	Best Novel, Biennial Award, League of American Pen women; Best Novel for Young Ad, American Library Association; Historical Novel of the Year, RT Times awards; Book-of-the-Month Club Selection
	Bard: The Odyssey Of The Irish	Poetry in Prose Award, Galician Society, University of Santiago de Compostela; Award of Merit, The Celtic League
	Xeres: Past & Present : Non-fiction Biography	Part of The World Leaders Series; Commissioned by City College of New York, with introduction by Arthur M. Schlesinger, Jr.
	Red Branch	Selection of Quality Paperback Book Club
	Brian Boru: Emperor Of The Irish	Winner of Bisto Award for Excellence in Children's Literature
	Druids	Best Foreign Language Novel, Academie Celtique
1991	The Last Prince of Ireland	History book Club International selection
1993	Strongbow: The Story of Richard and Aoife	Winner of Bisto Award for Excellence in Children's Literature; Winner of Reading Association of Ireland Biennial Award for Best Book for Children
	Finn Mac Cool	Selection of Quality Paperback Book Club
1996	Cold Places	100 Best Books for Children, Britain
	Pride of Lions	Literary Guild Selection
	1916: A Novel Of The Irish Rebellion	Barnes & Noble national bestseller list; Irish-American Heritage Award
