= Wells Theatre =

- U.S. National Register of Historic Places
- Virginia Landmarks Register
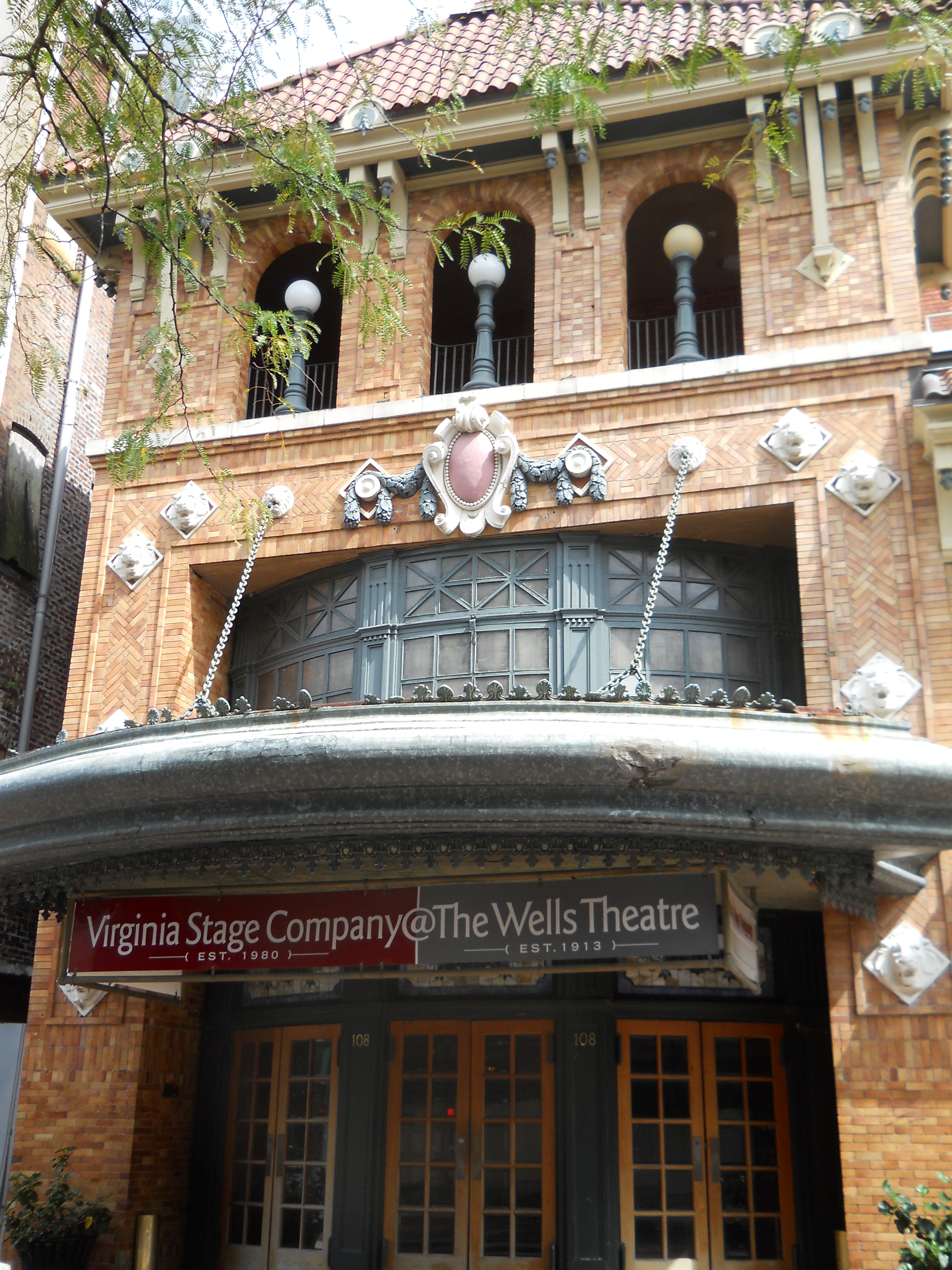

- Location within Virginia Location within the United States
- Location: 108 E. Tazewell St., Norfolk, Virginia
- Coordinates: 36°50′56″N 76°17′26″W
- Area: 0.5 acres (0.20 ha)
- Built: 1913
- Architect: E.C. Horn & Sons
- Architectural style: Beaux-Arts
- NRHP reference No.: 80004312
- VLR No.: 122-0067

Significant dates
- Added to NRHP: May 19, 1980
- Designated VLR: March 18, 1980

The Wells Theatre is a performing arts venue located in downtown Norfolk, Virginia. It has housed the Virginia Stage Company since 1979. The Wells Theatre is owned and operated by the City of Norfolk and is part of The Seven Venues.

== History ==
The theatre opened on August 26, 1913 with a production of The Merry Countess, a Shubert musical. In 1916 Jake Wells installed a movie screen and projector, although theatrical bookings continued to occupy most of the theatre's schedule. Many of America's leading performers appeared at the Wells, among them John Drew, Maude Adams, Otis Skinner, John Philip Sousa, Billie Burke, Fred and Adele Astaire and Will Rogers. Throughout the Great Depression, the Wells continued to stage vaudeville shows and movies. Burlesque was added to the theatre's repertoire around the beginning of World War II, which provided a steady source of income by attracting thousands of sailors stationed in Norfolk. Throughout the 1940s and 50s the theatre continued to operate as a movie house also. In the 1960s the Wells shared in the general decline of downtown Norfolk by converting to an X-rated movie house and occasionally staged live burlesque shows. The backstage area became the Jamaican Room, one of Norfolk's infamous gin mills and brothels.

The poured-in-place, steel-reinforced concrete structure was technologically advanced for the period. The New Wells' ornate decoration made the theatre the flagship of Wells Amusement Enterprises, and continues today as a well-preserved example of Beaux-Arts neoclassicism. It was listed on the National Register of Historic Places in 1980. The theatre originally had 1,650 seats with 12 boxes and three balconies. The top balcony served as a segregated balcony "For Negro Audiences Only," and with had its own entrance and box office. A system of stairs made inside access easy, allowing waiters from Wong Ping's Chinese Restaurant to serve theatre patrons on the second floor roof garden before and after performances. The downstairs Trustees Lobby facing Tazewell Street housed Doumar's Cones and BBQ's first location in Norfolk.

The brothers would eventually operate 42 theatres in nine states. In Norfolk, Wells operated The Granby, Academy, Colonial, NorVa, Strand, New Wells and the American Theatre. Otto managed their entire theatrical enterprise from Norfolk with multiple ticker-tape machines that allowed him to calculate each theatre's box office earnings.
