= Val Vigoda =

American singer-songwriter

- Genres: Classical; rock; pop rock; rock and roll
- Occupations: Singer, songwriter, electric violinist
- Instrument: Electric violin
- Years active: 1994–present
- Website: www.valvigoda.com

Valerie "Val" Vigoda is an American electric violinist and singer-songwriter. She is best known for writing and starring in musicals including Striking 12 and Ernest Shackleton Loves Me, the latter of which opened Off-Broadway in 2017, touring internationally with Cyndi Lauper, Joe Jackson, and the Trans-Siberian Orchestra, and for her one-woman concert "Just Getting Good" which has toured nationally.

== Early life and influences ==
Vigoda was admitted to Princeton University at the age of 14, withdrawing after one year to complete her classical violin training. She returned after a few years, graduating with honors and a degree in sociology.

== Career ==
Vigoda founded the musical trio GrooveLily in 1994, originally naming it The Valerie Vigoda Band, along with Brendan Milburn and Gene Lewin. In the 1990s, Vigoda toured with Cyndi Lauper, Joe Jackson, and the Trans-Siberian Orchestra.

Vigoda has a one-woman show Just Getting Good in which she both sings and plays the six-string electric violin while utilizing live-looping. Her work has received positive feedback, with The New York Times calling it "exhilarating", The Boston Globe describing it as "a thrilling trip", The Washington Post praising Vigoda for "unleashing a diva-worthy torrent of passion", and Palo Alto Weekly crediting her as "truly amazing, an awesome vision of embodied musicality, moving as one with her violin, making it sing and singing along with it in a voice both smoky and angelic".

She is the lyricist and star of the musical Ernest Shackleton Loves Me, which has been produced at ArtsEmerson, George Street Playhouse in New Brunswick, and Seattle Repertory. The show went into previews off-Broadway at Second Stage on April 14 and opened May 7. She has also co-written musicals along with longtime collaborator Brendan Milburn, including Beautiful Poison, Sleeping Beauty Wakes, Striking 12, Long Story Short (musical), Midsummer, Toy Story: The Musical, and Wheelhouse. Vigoda has also co-written and contributed the music for tracks in Disney films and television shows including Tinkerbell and the Great Fairy Rescue, Pixie Hollow Games, and Secret of the Wings.

In 2023, La Mirada Theatre for the Performing Arts presented a staged reading of her new musical Miss Foxhole 1975 with a book by Joe DiPietro and music & lyrics by Ryan O’Connell and Val Vigoda. The show is based on a true story about Jill Morgenthaler who joined the first class of women admitted to cadet training in 1975 at Fort Bragg. The narrative tracks how the women faced different trials than the men - including an order to participate in a beauty pageant.

== Teaching ==
Vigoda is an artist mentor with the "Electrify Your Strings" program, a musical education experience created to introduce and encourage young string musicians and choral singers to perform rock 'n' roll. She has taught at Stanford University, Emerson College, and the Berklee College of Music.

== Keynote Speaker ==
Vigoda began presenting keynote concerts at national conferences in 2018, combining her music with personal stories and an inspirational message of resilience through creativity and connection.

== Discography ==
=== Albums ===
Title	Year	Label	Other Artist(s)
Inhabit My Heart	1994	QMR Records	GrooveLily
Jungle & Sky	1996	QMR Records	GrooveLily
Brendan & The Extenuating Circumstances	1998	QMR Records	GrooveLily
Little Light	2000	QMR Records	GrooveLily
Folk Appetizer	2001	QMR Records	GrooveLily
Just The Three Of Us	2002	QMR Records	GrooveLily
The Nutshell EP	2002	QMR Records	GrooveLily
Are We There Yet?	2003	QMR Records	GrooveLily
Striking 12	2005	PS Classics	GrooveLily
A Little Midsummer Night's Music	2007	PS Classics	GrooveLily
Sleeping Beauty Wakes	2009	PS Classics	GrooveLily
Warner-Chappell Demos 2010	2010	Warner/Chappell	GrooveLily
Striking 12: Bonus Tracks	2010	PS Classics	GrooveLily
Sleeping Beauty Wakes: La Jolla Playhouse Bonus Tracks	2011	PS Classics	GrooveLily
Wheelhouse	2013	Independent	GrooveLily
While You Were Out	2013	Independent	GrooveLily
Just Getting Good	2016	Independent	

=== Singles ===
Title	Year	Label	Album
"Summer's Just Begun" (lyrics, music)	2010	Disney	Tinkerbell and the Great Fairy Rescue (Soundtrack)
"Summer's Just Begun" – reprise (lyrics, music)	2010	Disney	Tinkerbell and the Great Fairy Rescue (Soundtrack)
"Come Flying With Me" (lyrics)	2010	Disney	Tinkerbell and the Great Fairy Rescue (Soundtrack)
"Dig Down Deeper"	2011	Disney	Pixie Hollow Games (Soundtrack)
"Wild Moon NYC"	2011	Independent	Single
"We'll Be There"	2012	Disney	Secret of the Wings (Soundtrack)
"The Great Divide"	2012	Disney	Secret of the Wings (Soundtrack)
"The Great Divide" – end credits	2012	Disney	Secret of the Wings (Soundtrack)
"Thaw/Irish Lullaby"	2012	Independent	Single

== Awards and nominations ==
Along with Brendan Milburn, Vigoda has won the Jonathan Larson Award for Excellence in Musical Theatre, the LA Ovation Award for Best Musical, and the ASCAP Richard Rodgers Award for her work. They were also nominated for a Lucille Lortel Award for Outstanding Musical (Striking 12) in 2006. Vigoda was nominated for an Annie Award in 2012 for Music in a Television Production (Pixie Hollow Games) and in 2013 for Music in an Animated Feature Production (Secret of the Wings).
