= Death Takes a Holiday (musical) =

- Promotional artwork
- Music: Maury Yeston
- Lyrics: Maury Yeston
- Book: Peter Stone and Thomas Meehan
- Basis: La Morte in Vacanza by Alberto Casella
- Premiere: July 14, 2011: Laura Pels Theatre, New York City
- Productions: 2011 off-Broadway; 2017 off West End

Death Takes a Holiday is a musical with music and lyrics by Maury Yeston and a book by Peter Stone and Thomas Meehan. It is adapted from the 1924 Italian play La Morte in Vacanza by Alberto Casella, which was translated in English for Broadway in 1929 by Walter Ferris. The play was previously was adapted into a 1934 film of the same name starring Fredric March, which was remade in 1998 as Meet Joe Black. The story follows the personification of Death, who takes the form of a handsome young prince to understand human emotion. He falls in love with an engaged young woman and learns about love and sacrifice.

The show played off-Broadway for a limited run in the summer of 2011 in a production by Roundabout Theatre Company and received eleven nominations for the 2011–12 Drama Desk Awards, though it did not win any. It was listed by Time magazine as one of the Top Ten Musicals of the season. The production garnered mixed reviews. An Off West End production played in 2017.

== Background ==
Maury Yeston and Peter Stone began work on the musical in 1997, immediately after their success with Titanic. Titanic was a large-scale show, and Yeston and Stone decided to turn to a smaller-scale work for their next piece. They felt that the Cassella play, a story celebrating the joy and humor of love, was both universal and moving, and that with its recent adaptation as Meet Joe Black, it was a good time to musicalize the story. Yeston said, "it seemed to me that the piece screamed to be sung." Since the story is set in Northern Italy during the Roaring Twenties, Yeston incorporated jazz, the Shimmy, and other period styles into his contemporary score "to achieve a modern sensibility within the Period flavor of the score." Yeston had lived in Northern Italy for a time, which informed his writing. He further explained that Casella wrote the story "in response to the overwhelming killing in World War One and the pandemic that followed. ... [Death] collects souls. Exhausted from the recent scale of killing ... resolves that he needs to know why people ... cling to life, why is that important? ... [He takes] a few days off ... then he falls in love and discovers that what makes life so precious is that it's not endless".

Following Stone's death in 2003, Thomas Meehan took over writing the book.

== Productions ==
Death Takes a Holiday premiered off-Broadway at the Laura Pels Theatre on June 10, 2011 (in previews) and officially on July 14, for a limited run through September 4, 2011, in a production by Roundabout Theatre Company. The musical was directed by Doug Hughes, with choreography by Peter Pucci, set design by Derek McLane, and costumes by Catherine Zuber. The cast included Linda Balgord (Contessa Danielli), Matt Cavenaugh (Major Fenton), Mara Davi (Alice), Kevin Earley (Death/Sirki), Simon Jones, Rebecca Luker (Duchess Stephanie), Jill Paice (Grazia), Michael Siberry (Duke Vittorio Lamberti), Alexandra Socha, Don Stephenson and Max von Essen (Corrado Montelli). British actor Julian Ovenden, left the show due to vocal trouble and was replaced by his understudy, Kevin Earley. The original cast recording was released in October 2011, by PS Classics, with Earley in the role of Death.

The production received mixed reviews and The New York Times called it a "gorgeously sung but fusty musical". Similarly, Steven Suskin, in reviewing the original cast album, wrote that "Maury Yeston has given us a liltingly romantic and lovely operetta-like score. ... Book and score do not complement each other, at least not as presented at the Pels. ... The entire show – not only on the CD but in the theatre – was lifted by the presence of a fine group of singing actors." Time magazine ranked the show among the Top Ten of the year and commented on the brief run: "Death deserved to live on." It was nominated for eleven 2011–12 Drama Desk Awards, but it did not win any.

An Off West End production opened in January 2017 at London's Charing Cross Theatre with a limited run ending in March 2017. Zoë Doano starred as Grazia, with Chris Peluso as Death and Gay Soper as the Contessa. Thom Southerland directed. A review in the Sunday Express commented: "The presiding genius of this musical adaptation is composer/lyricist Maury Yeston whose lush, operetta-like scores make him the heir to Jerome Kern's crown among the current crop of Broadway writers. As in previous works such as Grand Hotel and Titanic, he displays a rare ability to give voice to a wide range of characters, often within a single song. Thom Sutherland, renewing his collaboration with Yeston after the recent Titanic, directs this gentler piece with delicacy and elegance."

== Plot synopsis ==
Act I

Duke Vittorio Lamberti and his family are driving home to their hilltop villa outside of Venice in 1921 after the engagement party of their daughter, Grazia, to Corrado Montelli. A mysterious shadowy figure blocks the road and the car screeches to a halt. Grazia is thrown from the car but, miraculously, is unhurt. Even her clothes are unruffled ("In the Middle of Your Life/Nothing Happened"). She knows that the world has changed for her and wonders if her engagement to Corrado is what she wants ("How Will I Know?"). Later that night, Death, inspired by Grazia's beauty, visits Grazia in her garden ("Centuries"). He then goes to her father and explains that he has taken the body of the duke's friend, Prince Nikolai Sirki, who has just committed suicide, in order to take human form for the weekend so that he may learn about human emotions and why death is so feared ("Why Do All Men?"). He threatens dire consequences if the duke reveals his identity. Death, in the guise of Prince Nikolai, appears at the door of the villa, and Vittorio introduces him to his wife, Stephanie, her mother the Contessa Evangelina, and Evangelina's old flame, Dr. Albione. Unknown to Death, a servant, Fidele, has overheard their discussion, and he is terrified that "Death Is in the House"; the duke tells him to keep it secret.

The next day, the prince is excited at the prospect of life, and the prospect of understanding what it means to be human ("Alive!"). He strolls down to the lake (Life's a Joy"), where he meets Grazia. They stare at each other intently and are about to kiss when Duke Vittorio appears. He is afraid for his daughter, knowing the prince is really Death, and uses her engagement to chide her for being alone with another man ("Who Is This Man?"). Grazia breaks her engagement to Corrado. Later, the prince discovers Alice, the widow of Grazia's brother Roberto (killed in action during the war) in the music room. She is taken with him and invites him to sing and dance with her. They are about to kiss when she realizes that he is interested in Grazia ("Shimmy Like They Do in Paree"). That evening Roberto's best friend, Major Eric Fenton, arrives with his sister Daisy. The prince is introduced as an old friend of Roberto's, and Eric is immediately suspicious. When he looks into the prince's eyes he sees something hauntingly familiar ("Roberto's Eyes"). At dinner, Grazia tells the story of two long-ago lovers in a local grotto who leapt from a cliff hand in hand so that they could be together for all eternity. Afterwards, she takes the prince to that grotto, where they kiss passionately ("Alone Here with You").

Act II

It is Sunday, with an approaching storm ("Something's Happened"). The duke's family has grown ill at ease with Prince Nikolai, who wanders around, looking for Grazia's room. Instead, he enters Roberto's room, where his mother, Stephanie, holds mourning. She tells him It is a sacred place to her ("Losing Roberto"). Later, in the garden, Daisy commiserates with Corrado, with whom she has secretly been in love ("What Do You Do"). Vittorio pleads with Death not to take his remaining child, but his pleas fall on seemingly deaf ears. Later, Death meets with Grazia in the grotto again. She asks what they will do, now that they have spent an entire night together. He tells her that they must part and never see each other again, even though he finds the prospect unendurable ("More and More").

Major Fenton has taken his private plane to Monte Carlo and returns with the news that the real Prince Nikolai is dead, and this one is an impostor. Alice and Daisy tell Grazia of this news, but she refuses to believe them ("Finally to Know"). Meanwhile, the duke has learned that Death now plans to take Grazia with him when he leaves at midnight. He bursts into the prince's room and challenges him. Death replies that he loves Grazia and cannot imagine going on without her. The duke tells him that true love requires that he put Grazia's life and needs before his own. If he loves her, he will let her experience the joys and sorrows of life. Reluctantly, Death agrees ("I Thought That I Could Live"). Contessa Evangelina reveals to Dr. Albione that she knew who Nikolai was and confesses that she still loves him ("December Time"). Vittorio reveals Nikolai's true identity to the household ("Pavane"). Just before the stroke of midnight Grazia appears before Nikolai, demanding to go with him. He reveals that he is Death. Grazia says that it makes no difference/ and she loves him and wants to be with him forever. At midnight, he takes her hand, and she dies. They walk, hand in hand, into the distant light, as she exclaims, "Love is stronger than Death".

== Roles and original cast ==
- Contessa Evangelina Di San Danielli – Linda Balgord
- Major Eric Fenton – Matt Cavenaugh
- Alice Lamberti – Mara Davi
- Corrado Montelli – Max von Essen
- Cora – Joy Hermalyn
- Lorenzo – Jay Jaski
- Dr. Dario Albione – Simon Jones
- Duchess Stephanie Lamberti – Rebecca Luker
- Sophia – Patricia Noonan
- Death, posing as Prince Nikolai Sirki – Julian Ovenden, replaced by Kevin Earley
- Grazia Lamberti – Jill Paice
- Duke Vittorio Lamberti – Michael Siberry
- Daisy Fenton – Alexandra Socha
- Fidele – Don Stephenson

== Musical numbers ==
Act I

- "In the Middle of Your Life" – Lamberti family
- "Nothing Happened" – Lamberti family
- "How Will I Know?" – Grazia
- "Centuries" – Death
- "Why Do All Men?" – Death and Vittorio
- "Death is in the House" – Fidele and Vittorio
- "Alive!" – Sirki, Fidele and Sophia
- "Life's a Joy" – Dr. Albione, Grazia, Sirki and Company
- "Who is This Man?" – Grazia
- "Life's a Joy" (Reprise) – Cora, Sophia, Lorenzo and Fidele
- "Shimmy Like They Do In Paree" – Alice and Sirki
- "Roberto's Eyes" – Major Fenton
- "Alone Here With You" – Grazia and Sirki

Act II

- "Something Happened" – Company
- "Losing Roberto" – Stephanie
- "What Do You Do" – Daisy and Corrado
- "More and More" – Sirki and Grazia
- "Finally to Know" – Grazia, Daisy and Alice
- "I Thought That I Could Live" – Death
- "December Time" – Contessa Danielli and Dr. Albione
- "Pavane" – Stephanie, Vittorio and Company
- Finale – Grazia and Death

== Awards and nominations ==
=== Original off-Broadway production ===
Year	Award	Category	Nominee	Result
2012	Drama Desk Award	Outstanding Musical		Nominated
2012	Drama Desk Award	Outstanding Book of a Musical	Peter Stone and Thomas Meehan	Nominated
2012	Drama Desk Award	Outstanding Actor in a Musical	Kevin Earley	Nominated
2012	Drama Desk Award	Outstanding Featured Actor in a Musical	Matt Cavenaugh	Nominated
2012	Drama Desk Award	Outstanding Director of a Musical	Doug Hughes	Nominated
2012	Drama Desk Award	Outstanding Music	Maury Yeston	Nominated
2012	Drama Desk Award	Outstanding Lyrics	Maury Yeston	Nominated
2012	Drama Desk Award	Outstanding Orchestrations	Larry Hochman	Nominated
2012	Drama Desk Award	Outstanding Costume Design	Catherine Zuber	Nominated
2012	Drama Desk Award	Outstanding Lighting Design	Kenneth Posner	Nominated
2012	Drama Desk Award	Outstanding Sound Design	Jon Weston	Nominated
