= Edyta Krzemień =

Polish actress and singer (born 1985)

Edyta Krzemień (born 24 October 1985 in Bukowno) is a Polish actress and singer. Since 2007, she was associated with the Roma Music Theatre in Warsaw. She also graduated in journalism from the Jagiellonian University in Kraków.

== Career ==
One of the greatest achievements of Krzemień was the role of Christine in the Broadway musical The Phantom of the Opera. In March 2009, she became the new speaking and singing voice of Disney's Snow White. In 2005–2007, she performed as Fleur de Lys in the French musical Notre-Dame de Paris. In addition, she also did the role of Bastienne in Bastien und Bastienne. During the Presentation of Mozart's Opera in Kraków, she sang old Polish and Russian songs and presented arias.

== Specific roles ==
=== Roles in Roma Music Theatre ===
- Akademia Pana Kleksa – Vocal group
- The Phantom of the Opera – Christine (2008–2010 and 2018)
- Les Misérables – Fantine (2010–2012)
- Piloci - Nina

=== Discography ===
- Opowieści Zimowe - Maury Yeston’s December Songs
- CD with music for the musical Phantom of the Opera – The party band vocal
- Snow White and the Seven Dwarfs – soundtrack
- Les Misérables, 2011 Roma Music Theatre cast – Fantine

=== Dubbing ===
- Snow White and the Seven Dwarfs (2009 Polish re-dubbing) – Snow White
- Wicked – Glinda (singing)
- Snow White – Good Queen

=== Other ===
- Sweeney Todd: the Demon Barber of Fleet Street, Teatr Rozrywki w Chorzowie, as Johanna Barker
- Tarzan, Gliwicki Teatr Muzyczny, as Kala
- ECHO by Cirque du Soleil, Touring Show, as lead vocalist
