= Tom Sawyer: A Ballet in Three Acts =

2011 ballet with score by Maury Yeston and choreography by William Whitener

Tom Sawyer: A Ballet in Three Acts premiered on October 14, 2011 at the Kauffman Center for the Performing Arts in Kansas City, Missouri. The score is by composer Maury Yeston, with choreography by William Whitener, artistic director of the Kansas City Ballet. The ballet is based on Mark Twain's 1876 novel, The Adventures of Tom Sawyer.

A review by Alastair Macaulay in The New York Times observed: "It’s quite likely that this is the first all-new, entirely American three-act ballet. It is based on an American literary classic, has an original score by an American composer and was given its premiere by an American choreographer and company ... both the score and the choreography are energetic, robust, warm, deliberately naïve (both ornery and innocent), in ways right for Twain. Paul Horsely in Dance Magazine writes “Tom Sawyer is an inventive amalgam of ballet, folk dance, pantomime, comedy, games, and narrative. It’s also injected with the youthful playfulness that has been Whitener’s signature in works like Gingham Shift, the piece that brought Whitener to Yeston’s attention. 'We’re focusing on a boy’s passage from childhood to his teenage years,' Whitener says, 'and taking responsibility when he and Becky are trapped in the cave—having to grow up quickly.' The ballet is also about “the power of the Mississippi and the grandeur of the great outdoors—and the charm and vitality of youth.” The design team were all Americans as well, consisting of Holly Hynes, (Costumes), Walt Spangler (Set) and Kirk Bookman (Lighting).

A two-disc 90-minute premiere recording of the complete score was recorded at Skywalker Sound with Martin West conducting the seventy-piece San Francisco Ballet Orchestra, and released on the PS Classics label on August 27, 2013. The first act musically depicts the sunny days of Tom in school, his infatuation with Becky Thatcher, and rafting on the river with Huck Finn. The second reveals the boys' witnessing a murder and a frame up at midnight in the cemetery, and the third dramatizes Tom's exonerating testimony at the trial of Muff Potter, and his subsequent discovery of gold in a cave, leading to an ultimate town celebration along the Mississippi. Yeston has subsequently created a 21-minute long Tom Sawyer Suite as a Pops Orchestra offering.

The work originated a year after Yeston's musical Nine opened on Broadway in 1982. Yeston was still an Associate Professor in musicology and Director of Undergraduate Musical Studies at Yale. He noted that few if any of the well-known American ballets (the Aaron Copland masterpieces, or Balanchine’s ballet On Your Toes) were even as much as an hour in length, let alone three-acts. He came up with the idea of Twain’s Tom Sawyer as a possible appropriate subject for a full-length form. The book "seemed a natural fit principally because its form, like ballet, is episodic”, he said, citing "The Painting of the Fence" scene, "Lost With Becky Thatcher in The Cave," "Witnessing the Murder in the Graveyard," as examples. Upon hearing the score William Whitener, Artistic Director of Kansas City Ballet, agreed to choreograph and mount the production, saying "When I first heard Maury Yeston's score for Tom Sawyer, I realized that we had a grand opportunity to bring this classic story to life as a dance-drama. The wit and beauty within Mr. Yeston's music, and the charm and playfulness of Mark Twain's novel make an ideal match for a ballet".
