= Pixie Hollow Games =

- Movie poster
- Written by: Jeffrey M. Howard
- Directed by: Bradley Raymond
- Starring: Mae Whitman; Megan Hilty; Brenda Song; Jason Dolley; Tiffany Thornton; Zendaya
- Theme music composer: Joel McNeely
- Country of origin: United States
- Original language: English

Production
- Producer: Helen Kalafatic
- Editor: Margaret Hou
- Running time: 23 minutes
- Production company: Disneytoon Studios

Original release
- Network: Disney Channel
- Release: November 19, 2011

Pixie Hollow Games is a 23-minute animated television special broadcast on November 19, 2011, on Disney Channel. Based on the Disney Fairies franchise, it was produced by Disneytoon Studios and animated by Prana Studios. It features the voices of Megan Hilty, Brenda Song, Jason Dolley, Tiffany Thornton and Zendaya. The special also features the returning voices of Mae Whitman, Lucy Liu, Raven-Symoné, Pamela Adlon, Angela Bartys and others, as Tinker Bell and the other fairies of Pixie Hollow in Never Land, taking part in an Olympic-style competition. It is based loosely on J. M. Barrie's Peter Pan stories, by way of Disney's animated adaptation.

It was originally intended as the last of five feature-length films in the Tinker Bell film series of direct-to-DVD 3D animated films, with the title Tinker Bell: Race through the Seasons, and a release date in 2012. However, the movie was rescheduled and retooled as a TV special instead of a film-length movie. Unlike the previous feature films in this series, Tinker Bell is not a central featured character in this special release, which is focused on Rosetta.

== Plot ==
Rosetta is busy helping to set up flowers when she meets a new garden fairy named Chloe, who announces she has been training for the Pixie Hollow Games and is excited to be competing. Even though the garden fairies have little hope of winning and have never won, Chloe is confident that she and her partner can turn things around. When it comes time for the team selection, Chloe has already volunteered and Rosetta is selected to be her partner.

On the night of the games, Rosetta wears a fancy gown, certain that her team will be eliminated after one round. The storm fairies, Rumble and Glimmer, are the heavy favorites to win the competition due to their winning streak and having winners' rings for almost every finger. The first event is leapfrogging. Rosetta refuses to get onto the frog but finally does when the spectators yell in protest, leading to total chaos on the racetrack. They advance due to another team's contraption damage.

The next day, Rosetta and Chloe continue to compete in a series of games - dragonfly water skiing, twig-spheres, and mouse polo, slowly moving up in the standings. In the penultimate teacup race, Chloe dives down the chute with no trouble, but Rosetta nervously crawls down, to Chloe's dismay. Rosetta's actions put them in second last place, causing Chloe to start doubting her. Rosetta finally realises the problem and the two reconcile the next day.

In the final derby cart race, two of the teams each try and fail to pass one of the designated shortcuts. Rosetta and Chloe take the mudslide mountain shortcut and successfully make it over thanks to Tinker Bell's cart modifications. Just before they can succeed, Rumble uses Glimmer's lightning ability to zap one of the wheels of the girls' cart, much to Glimmer's chagrin. Distraught, Rosetta and Chloe still manage to push their destroyed cart over the finish line together. While Rumble celebrates his victory, Queen Clarion announces that the garden fairies are the winners. Rumble protests, until she shows him that Glimmer abandoned him just before the finish line for his cheating. Rosetta and Chloe thus become the new champions and they celebrate with their friends.

Bobble and Clank recap the event in the closing credits, with Rosetta and Chloe receiving their personalized winners' rings, as well as the tournament's trophy.

== Cast ==
- Megan Hilty as Rosetta, a garden fairy and the main protagonist of the film. Hilty replaces Kristin Chenoweth from previous films
- Brenda Song as Chloe, a new garden fairy and Rosetta's partner
- Jason Dolley as Rumble, a storm fairy and the main antagonist of the film
- Tiffany Thornton as Glimmer, a storm fairy and Rumble's partner
- Zendaya as Fern, a garden fairy
- Mae Whitman as Tinker Bell, a tinker fairy
- Lucy Liu as Silvermist, a water fairy
- Raven-Symoné as Iridessa, a light fairy
- Angela Bartys as Fawn, an animal fairy
- Pamela Adlon as Vidia, a fast-flying fairy
- Jeff Bennett as Clank, a large tinker fairy with a booming voice / Fairy Gary, the overseer of the pixie-dust keepers and Terence's partner
- Rob Paulsen as Bobble, a wispy tinker fairy with large glasses / Buck, a new animal fairy and Fawn's partner
- Jane Horrocks as Fairy Mary, the overseer of the tinker fairies and Tink's partner
- Jessica DiCicco as Lilac, a garden fairy / Lumina, a new light fairy and Iridessa's partner
- Kari Wahlgren as Ivy, a garden fairy
- Alicyn Packard as Zephyr, a new fast-flying fairy and Vidia's partner
- Jesse McCartney as Terence, the pixie-dust keeper
- Dan Curtis Lee as Starter Sparrowman
- Kraisit Agnew as Tabby
- Anjelica Huston as Queen Clarion, the queen of all Pixie Hollow

== Music ==
The score to the special is composed by Joel McNeely, who scored the first three Tinker Bell films. Zendaya sings the theme song (written by Brendan Milburn and Val Vigoda of GrooveLily), which is called "Dig Down Deeper". Zendaya performed "Dig Down Deeper" in the 2011 Macy's Thanksgiving Day Parade. In Spain, the main theme was played by Lydia Fairen.

== Release ==
The special debuted in the United States on The Disney Channel on November 19, 2011.

The special was included as a bonus feature on the Blu-ray releases of Secret of the Wings in 2012. A standalone DVD was released on August 20, 2013.

== Sequel ==
A fourth full-length Tinker Bell film, Secret of the Wings, was originally announced to be released before the special, but was instead released on October 23, 2012.
