= Jill Paice =

American actress

- Occupation: Actress
- Years active: 2001–present
- Known for: musical theatre roles

Jill Paice is an American actress best known for her musical theatre roles. She originated the roles of Laura Fairlie in the musical The Woman in White in the West End (2004) and on Broadway (2005); Niki in Curtains on Broadway (2006); Scarlett in London's Gone With The Wind (2008); and Grazia Off-Broadway in Death Takes a Holiday (2011). Among other roles, she appeared in the Broadway play The 39 Steps (2009).

== Education ==
Paice attended Beavercreek High School in Beavercreek, Ohio, graduating in 1998. She then attended Baldwin-Wallace College, graduating with a bachelor of musical theater in 2002. There, she starred as Maria in West Side Story and as Mabel in The Pirates of Penzance at Baldwin-Wallace. She also starred as Violet, the title character of a new musical.

== Career ==
In 2001, while still in school, Paice appeared in a production of Gypsy at the Great Lakes Theater Festival in Cleveland, Ohio, earning her Equity card. Upon graduating from college she appeared in the national tour of Les Misérables and in 2003 the Las Vegas production of Mamma Mia! as Sophie.

In 2004, she created the role of Laura Fairle in Andrew Lloyd Webber's new musical The Woman in White at the Palace Theatre, London. Lloyd Webber was required to hire two "unknown American actors" in order to satisfy Actors Equity union rules for the future transfer of the production to Broadway to include the British actors Michael Crawford and Maria Friedman. Paice reprised her role in the Broadway production in 2005 at the Marquis Theatre in New York. She received good notices, but the show closed after only 109 performances on Broadway.

Off-Broadway, Paice appeared in the York Theatre Company productions of Weird Romance (2004) and The Gig (2006).

In 2006 she originated the role of Nikki Harris in Curtains in the pre-Broadway try-out at the Ahmanson Theatre, Los Angeles and, in 2007, on Broadway at the Al Hirschfeld Theatre, opposite David Hyde Pierce. She left Curtains in February 2008, and returned to London's West End to originate the role of Scarlett in Trevor Nunn's musical adaption of Gone With The Wind (2008). Nunn had been working on the project while Paice was still working on The Woman in White, and so she was able to do several readings and workshops for Nunn's project. The large-scale production of Gone With The Wind ran over three hours long and closed after 79 performances.

Later in 2008 she appeared as Elizabeth Lucas in Ace at the Signature Theater in Arlington, Virginia and as Betty Haynes in White Christmas in Detroit late in 2008 and at the Paper Mill Playhouse, New Jersey in November 2011. In January 2009, she played the role of Anne in a gala concert of A Little Night Music presented by the Roundabout Theatre Company.

In 2009, Paice appeared in her first non-musical play on Broadway, The 39 Steps, at the Helen Hayes Theatre as a replacement in the role of "Annabella Schmidt", among others.

She next starred as Florence in Chess the Musical at the Signature Theater in 2010. In 2011, she created the role of Grazia in Maury Yeston's Death Takes a Holiday in the original Off-Broadway production by Roundabout Theatre Company.

She was cast in the leading role of "I" in the musical Rebecca, which had been scheduled to open on Broadway in November 2012. The production of Rebecca on Broadway has been postponed.

On September 3, 2013, she took over the role of "Miss Honey" in the Broadway musical Matilda The Musical.

In April, 2015, Paice opened as Milo Davenport in the Broadway musical An American in Paris.

Paice's television work has included two guest starring appearances as Molly Benedict in the series Unforgettable.

== Awards ==
- 2009: Helen Hayes Award for Outstanding Lead Actress, Resident Musical - Elizabeth in Ace (Nominated)
- 2010: Helen Hayes Award for Outstanding Lead Actress, Resident Musical - Florence in "Chess" (Nominated)

== Recordings ==
- The Woman in White: A New Musical - Original London Cast Recording
- Curtains - Original Broadway Cast Recording
- The Gig - Original Off-Broadway Cast Recording
- Andrew Lloyd Webber on Broadway (Released with Jay Records)
- Death Takes A Holiday - Original Off-Broadway Cast Recording
- An American In Paris - Original Broadway Cast Recording
