= Rebecca Luker =

American actress (1961–2020)

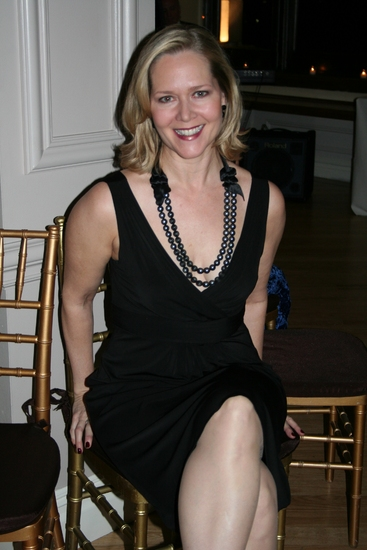
- Luker at the NYS ARTS Fall Gala 2008
- Born: April 17, 1961; Birmingham, Alabama, U.S.
- Died: December 23, 2020 (aged 59); Manhattan, New York City, U.S.
- Education: University of Montevallo, 1984
- Occupations: Actress, singer, recording artist
- Years active: 1983–2020
- Spouse(s): Gregory Jbara (m. 1993, div. 1996) Danny Burstein (m. 2000)

Rebecca Luker (April 17, 1961 – December 23, 2020) was an American actress, singer, and recording artist, noted for her "crystal clear operatic soprano" and for maintaining long runs in Broadway musicals over the course of her three-decade-long career. The New York Times compared her to actresses such as Barbara Cook and Julie Andrews.

Beginning in regional theatre productions in the early 1980s, Luker made her Broadway debut in the original cast of The Phantom of the Opera as a Christine understudy and later took over the role as the principal actress. She would then originate the role of Lily in The Secret Garden on Broadway in 1991. She was nominated for three Tony Awards, for her performances as Magnolia in Show Boat (1994), Marian in The Music Man (2000) and Winifred in Mary Poppins (2006), another role that she created. She performed widely in theatre throughout her career and also gave concert and cabaret performances. She began acting in television in 2000 and made several films. Luker continued to act until the year of her death, at the age of 59, from amyotrophic lateral sclerosis. She can be heard on more than 20 cast albums and various other recordings.

== Life and career ==
Luker, the daughter of Martha (Baggett), a high school treasurer, and Norse Doak Luker, Jr., a construction worker, was born in Birmingham, Alabama, and grew up in the suburb of Helena. She attended the University of Montevallo, earning a BA in music, taking a year off in 1984 to perform in Sweeney Todd as Johanna Barker at the Michigan Opera Theatre.

Luker's Broadway debut was in The Phantom of the Opera in the role of Christine (1988–91). She was originally an understudy for principal actress Sarah Brightman and her alternate Patti Cohenour. Luker later took over the role after Brightman and Cohenour left the show. She performed opposite Cris Groenendaal and Steve Barton as the Phantom. Subsequent Broadway roles include Lily in The Secret Garden (1991–93), Magnolia in Show Boat (1994–97, the first actress to be nominated for a Tony Award for this role), Maria in The Sound of Music (1998–99), Marian in The Music Man (2000–2001), and Claudia in Nine (2003). She played the role of Mrs. Banks in Mary Poppins from 2006 to 2010. She later replaced Victoria Clark as Crazy Marie/the Fairy Godmother in the Broadway production of Cinderella for an engagement that lasted from September 2013 to January 2014. Luker joined the cast of Fun Home at the Circle in the Square Theatre on Broadway, temporarily assuming the role of Helen Bechdel from April 5, 2016 to May 22, 2016.

Luker appeared Off-Broadway in The Vagina Monologues, Indian Summer, X (Life of Malcolm X), Brigadoon, Death Takes a Holiday, and Can't Let Go. During 2002, the Kennedy Center presented a "Sondheim Celebration"; Luker appeared in Passion as Clara. She performed in the New York City Center Encores! staged concerts of The Boys from Syracuse and Where's Charley?. Her TV appearances include Boardwalk Empire, The Good Wife, Matlock, Law & Order: Special Victims Unit, and the Hallmark movie Cupid & Cate. She appeared in the 2012 film Not Fade Away. On January 11, 2016, Luker reprised the role of Lily in The Secret Garden at a benefit performance at the Lucille Lortel Theatre.

Luker performed as a concert soloist with symphony orchestras around the world and in intimate solo settings. She performed a solo concert as part of the American Songbook Series at Lincoln Center in 2005, featuring 20 songs composed by a group of younger songwriters including Paul Loesel, Scott Burkell, Jeff Blumenkranz, Barry Kleinbort, and Joseph Thalken. Her 2006 solo cabaret debut at Feinstein's at the Regency received rave reviews from The New York Times and Variety as well as the Bisto award for best debut concert. She performed in 2008 solo concert at Kennedy Center's Terrace Theatre, a 2011 concert featuring the music of Rodgers and Hammerstein (again at Kennedy Center), and in 2012, the "Bridge to Broadway" as part of the NYC River to River Festival and "NEW VOICES at NYU: A Celebration of Songs by NYU Musical Theatre Writers Past and Present".

In 2001, Luker, Truman Capote, and the film version of To Kill a Mockingbird were all inducted into the Alabama Stage and Screen Hall of Fame. She also received a doctorate of fine arts, honoris causa, on May 5, 2010 from her alma mater, the University of Montevallo.

== Personal life ==
Luker married Gregory Jbara in 1993. They divorced in 1996. She married Danny Burstein in June 2000, becoming stepmother to his sons Zachary and Alexander.

On February 9, 2020, Luker announced that she was suffering from amyotrophic lateral sclerosis (ALS), having been diagnosed in late 2019. In June 2020, she could still sing, as she hosted a livestreamed benefit for ALS. However, by October, the disease had progressed to the point where she had "no diaphragm" and thus could not speak loudly. She had been in a wheelchair for seven months at the time.

In April 2020, Burstein contracted COVID-19 (along with several other cast members of Moulin Rouge!, in which he was starring). He was hospitalized at St. Luke's in Manhattan and recovered. Following his ordeal, Burstein wrote an account of it that was published in The Hollywood Reporter. Toward the end of that article, Burstein wrote, "while I'm getting better, Rebecca has started dealing with the virus as well now. She's not been tested, but has all the symptoms to varying degrees. We are monitoring her closely." Luker ultimately had a much milder case than her husband.

Luker died of ALS at a hospital in Manhattan on December 23, 2020, at age 59.

== Stage credits ==
=== Broadway ===
Year	Title	Role	Notes
1988–1991	The Phantom of the Opera	Princess/Understudy Christine Daaé	Original cast
1988–1991	The Phantom of the Opera	Alternate Christine Daaé	Replacement
1988–1991	The Phantom of the Opera	Christine Daaé	Replacement
1991–1993	The Secret Garden	Lily Craven	Originated the role
1994–1997	Show Boat	Magnolia Hawkes	Revival
1998–1999	The Sound of Music	Maria von Trapp	Revival
2000–2001	The Music Man	Marian Paroo	Revival
2003	Nine	Claudia	Replacement
2006–2010	Mary Poppins	Winifred Banks	Originated the role
2013–2014	Rodgers + Hammerstein's Cinderella	Marie	Replacement
2016	Fun Home	Helen Bechdel	Replacement

=== Other ===
Year	Title	Role	Venue
1983	A Little Night Music	Anne Egerman	Michigan Opera Theatre
1984	Sweeney Todd: The Demon Barber of Fleet Street	Johanna Barker	Michigan Opera Theatre
1985	Leave It to Jane	Jane Witherspoon	Goodspeed Opera House
1985-1986	The Music Man	Marian Paroo	Garde Arts Center
1986	No, No, Nanette	Nanette	Carnegie Hall
1987	Cinderella	Cinderella	Kansas City Starlight Theatre
1993	Gay Divorce	Mimi	Carnegie Hall
1993	Show Boat	Magnolia Hawks	North York Performing Arts Centre
1996	Brigadoon	Fiona MacLaren	New York City Opera
1996	Time and Again	Julia	Old Globe Theatre
1997	The Boys from Syracuse	Adriana	Encores! at New York City Center
1997	Harmony	Mary Hegel	La Jolla Playhouse
2002	The Vagina Monologues	Performer	Westside Theatre
2002	Passion	Clara	Kennedy Center
2003	She Loves Me	Amalia	Reprise Theatre Company
2003	Can't Let Go	performer	Keen Company
2006	Indian Blood	Jane	Primary Stages
2011	Where's Charley?	Donna Lucia D'Alvadorez	Encores!
2011	Death Takes a Holiday	Duchess Lamberti	Laura Pels Theater
2014	Little Dancer	Adult Marie von Goethem	Kennedy Center
2016	The Secret Garden	Lily Craven	Lucille Lortel Theatre
2019	Footloose	Vi Moore	Kennedy Center

== Filmography ==
=== Television ===
Year	Title	Role	Notes
2000	Cupid & Cate	Annette	TV movie
2004	Law & Order: Special Victims Unit	Wendy Campbell	Episode: "Poison"
2010	The Good Wife	Carleen Loren	Episode: "Taking Control"
2011	Submissions Only	Hannah Labove	Episode: "Mean Like Me"
2011	Law & Order: Special Victims Unit	Mrs. Walsh	Episode: "True Believers"
2012	Boardwalk Empire	Sister Agnes	Recurring; 4 episodes
2015	Law & Order: Special Victims Unit	Lisa Parker	Episode: "Transgender Bridge"
2017	Elementary	Virginia Spivey	Episode: "High Heat"
2018–2019	NCIS: New Orleans	Rose LaSalle	3 episodes
2020	Bull	Michele Downey	Episode: "Child of Mine"

=== Film ===
Year	Title	Role	Notes
1997	Beauty and the Beast: The Enchanted Christmas	Chorus (voice)	Video
2006	Spectropia	Singer at the ball	
2012	Not Fade Away	Marti Dietz	
2014	The Rewrite	Joan	

== Awards and nominations ==
Year	Award	Category	Work	Result
1991	Drama Desk Award	Outstanding Featured Actress in a Musical	The Secret Garden	Nominated
1995	Tony Award	Best Performance by a Leading Actress in a Musical	Show Boat	Nominated
1997	Drama-Logue Award	Performance	Harmony	Won
1998	Outer Critics Circle Award	Outstanding Actress in a Musical	The Sound of Music	Nominated
2000	Outer Critics Circle Award	Outstanding Actress in a Musical	The Music Man	Nominated
2000	Drama Desk Award	Outstanding Actress in a Musical	The Music Man	Nominated
2000	Tony Award	Best Performance by a Leading Actress in a Musical	The Music Man	Nominated
2007	Bistro Award	Debut	Feinstein's at the Regency (Solo Cabaret)	Won
2007	Tony Award	Best Performance by a Featured Actress in a Musical	Mary Poppins	Nominated
2007	Outer Critics Circle Award	Outstanding Featured Actress in a Musical	Mary Poppins	Nominated
2012	Outer Critics Circle Award	Outstanding Featured Actress in a Musical	Death Takes a Holiday	Nominated

== Discography ==
=== Solo recordings ===
- I Got Love - Songs of Jerome Kern (2013, PS Classics)
- Greenwich Time (2009, PS Classics)
- Leaving Home (2004, PS Classics)
- Anything Goes: Rebecca Luker Sings Cole Porter (1996, Varèse Sarabande)

=== Cast recordings ===
- Passion (2013 New York Cast Recording, PS Classics)
- Jerome Kern: The Land Where the Good Songs Go - A New Revue (2012 Studio Cast Recording, 101 Distribution, PS Classics)
- Sweet Little Devil (2012 Studio Cast Recording, PS Classics)
- Death Takes a Holiday (2011 Original Off-Broadway Cast Recording, PS Classics)
- Sweet Bye and Bye (2011 Studio Cast Recording, PS Classics)
- Life Begins at 8:40 (2010 World Premiere Recording, PS Classics)
- Kitty’s Kisses (2009 World Premiere Recording, PS Classics)
- Dear Edwina (2008 World Premiere Recording, PS Classics)
- Brownstone (2003 Studio Cast Recording, Original Cast Record)
- Everybody’s Getting into the Act (2003 Studio Cast Recording, Varèse Sarabande)
- The Music Man (2000 New Broadway Cast Recording, Q Records)
- Wonderful Town (1998 Studio Cast Recording, JAY Records)
- The Sound of Music (1998 New Broadway Cast Recording, RCA Victor)
- The Boys from Syracuse (1997 Encores! Cast Recording, DRG Records)
- Show Boat (1994 Revival Cast Album, Livent Music)
- Brigadoon (1992 Studio Cast Album, EMI Records)
- The Secret Garden (1991 Original Broadway Cast Album, Columbia Records)
- Strike Up the Band (1991 Studio Cast Album, Elektra Nonesuch)
- Annie Get Your Gun (1991 Studio Cast Album, EMI Records)
- Kiss Me, Kate (1990 Studio Cast Album, EMI Records)
- Show Boat (1988 Studio Cast Album, EMI Records)

=== Featured recordings ===
- Over the Moon: The Broadway Lullaby Project (2012, Over the Moon)
- Victor Herbert: Collected Songs (2012, New World Records)
- Show Some Beauty (2011, Yellow Sound Label)
- Poetic License 100 Poems/100 Performers (2010, GPR Records)
- Tom Herman: Music for Voice (2008, CDBY)
- State of Grace III (2006, Koch Int’l Classics)
- The Real Thing: Jamie deRoy and Friends, Volume 7 (2006, Harbinger Records)
- Jule Styne in Hollywood (2006, PS Classics)
- Philip Chaffin: Warm Spring Night (2005, PS Classics)
- Jeepers Creepers: Great Songs from Horror Films (2003, Red Circle)
- Aria 3: Metamorphosis (2003, Koch Records)
- Believe: The Songs of The Sherman Brothers (2003, Varèse Sarabande)
- Sweet Appreciation: Rusty Magee Live at the West Bank Café (2002, SixFootPlusMusic)
- Peter Buchi: An American Voice (2002, Azica)
- My Favorite Broadway: The Love Songs (2001, Hybrid Recordings)
- Aria 2: New Horizon (1999, Astor Place Recordings)
- A Little Bit in Love (1999 Compilation Album, JAY Records)
- Simple Gifts: Carols from the Abbey (1998, Broadway Cares/Equity Fights AIDS)
- Bernstein Dances (1998, Deutsche Grammophon)
- A Special Place: Songs from the Heart (1998, Original Cast Records)
- George & Ira Gershwin: Standards & Gems (1998 Compilation Album, Nonesuch Records)
- The Best of the Broadway Divas (1997 Compilation Album, Varèse Sarabande)
- The Best of In Celebration of Life 1-5 (Broadway Cares/Equity Fights AIDS)
- Aria (1997, Astor Place Recordings)
- Beauty and the Beast: The Enchanted Christmas (1997, Walt Disney Records)
- Unsung Musicals II (1995, Varèse Sarabande)
- Lost in Boston III (1995, Varèse Sarabande)
- Voices of Broadway: Songs of Conscience and Hope (1994, Broadway Cares/Equity Fights AIDS)
- Musicals! (1993 Compilation Album, EMI Records)
- Unsung Sondheim (1993, Varèse Sarabande)
- Jerome Kern Treasury (1993, EMI Records)
- Jerome Kern in London and Hollywood (1992, Rialto Records)
- Broadway Showstoppers (1992, EMI Records)
- Sing Before Breakfast (1991, Rialto Records)
- Plácido Domingo: The Broadway I Love (1991, Warner Music)
- Early Kern (1991, Rialto Recordings)
- Keep Your Undershirt On (1990, Rialto Recordings)
