= Kevin Earley =

American actor and singer

- Born: Chicago, Illinois, U.S.
- Education: Webster University (BFA '94)
- Occupations: Actor, singer
- Spouse: Julie Ann Emery
- Website: www.kevinearley.com

Kevin Earley is an American actor and singer.

== Biography ==
Earley was born in Chicago, Illinois, one of four brothers, and attended Mundelein High School in Mundelein, Illinois. He trained at the Webster Conservatory of Webster University in the St. Louis, Missouri metro-area where he earned his B.F.A. in 1994. He is married to Julie Ann Emery, who he met, and acted with, while in college.

Kevin was cast as Ernest Defarge in the Broadway musical adaptation of A Tale of Two Cities, which opened for preview on August 19, 2008 at the Al Hirschfeld Theatre in New York.

== Theatre Credits ==
- The Sound of Music, Captain Georg von Trapp (2025-2027) - US National Tour
- Stephen Sondheim's Old Friends (2025) - Broadway
- Natasha, Pierre & the Great Comet of 1812, Pierre Bezukhov (2024) - Pioneer Theatre Company
- Something Rotten!, Portia's Father / Brother Jeremiah (2023) - Fulton Opera House
- The Play That Goes Wrong, Robert Grove (2023) - Fulton Opera House
- Sweeney Todd: The Demon Barber of Fleet Street, Sweeney Todd (2018) - Pioneer Theatre Company
- Guys and Dolls, Sky Masterson (2018) - Fulton Opera House
- Jesus Christ Superstar, Pontius Pilate (2017)
- The Secret Garden, Lord Archibald Craven (2015)
- The Pirates of Penzance, The Pirate King (2012)
- Death Takes a Holiday, Death / Prince Nikolai Sirki (2011) - Off-Broadway
- Sunset Boulevard, Joe Gillis (2010)
- Oklahoma, Jud Fry (2010)
- Into the Woods, The Wolf / Cinderella's Prince (2009) - Benedum Center
- Les Misérables, Enjolras (2009) - Benedum Center
- 1776, Thomas Jefferson (2009) - Paper Mill Playhouse
- A Tale of Two Cities, Ernest Defarge (2008) - Broadway
- Hello, Dolly!, Cornelius Hackl (2008)
- Les Misérables, Constable / Enjolras (u/s) (2007-08) - Broadway
- Chess, Anatoly Sergievsky (2007) - Broadway Cares/Equity Fights AIDS
- Anything Goes, Billy Crocker (2006)
- Camelot, Sir Sagramore (2005) - Hollywood Bowl
- Thoroughly Modern Millie, Trevor Graydon (2003–2004) - Broadway
- My Fair Lady, Freddy Eynsford-Hill (2003) - Hollywood Bowl
- The Music Man, Ewart Dunlop (2002) - Hollywood Bowl
- 1776, Edward Rutledge (2001) - Concert
- Carousel, Billy Bigelow (2001 & 2003)
- Les Misérables, Enjolras (1999-2000) - 3rd US National Tour
- Les Misérables, Lesgles / Enjolras (u/s) (1998) - Broadway
- Assassins, Balladeer (1996)

== Film and television ==
- Girlfriends, Guest Star (2006), UPN
- Imagine That (Pilot), Host, Disney / Love Letters Ltd.
- Pre -K (2007), Opera Man, Directed by Thomas Ian Griffith
- Opus 4, Starring Role, Premier Films
- Ten Commandments (DVD), Ramses (2006), BCBG Ent. (Live at the Kodak Theatre)

== Recordings ==
- Earley Standards, Solo CD, Midlothian Road Productions Inc.
- Ripper (Original Cast), Chester, Nelsen Productions Inc.
- Rarities, Rogers and Heart, Bygone Records
