= Robert LuPone =

American actor (1946–2022)

- Born: Robert Francis LuPone; July 29, 1946; New York City, U.S.
- Died: August 27, 2022 (aged 76); Albany, New York, U.S.
- Education: Juilliard School
- Occupations: Actor, artistic director
- Years active: 1967–2022
- Spouse: Virginia Robinson
- Children: 1
- Relatives: Patti LuPone (sister); Adelina Patti (great-great aunt)

Robert Francis LuPone (July 29, 1946 – August 27, 2022) was an American actor and artistic director. He worked on stage, in film, and in television. He was the brother of actress Patti LuPone.

== Early life and training ==
LuPone was born in Brooklyn on July 29, 1946. His father, Orlando Joseph LuPone, worked as a school administrator and English teacher at Walt Whitman High School in Huntington, Long Island; his mother, Angela Louise (Patti), was a library administrator at the C.W. Post Campus of Long Island University. His great-great aunt was 19th-century Spanish-born Italian opera singer Adelina Patti. His father's side came from Abruzzo, while his mother's side is Sicilian. LuPone was raised in Northport, New York, on Long Island. He trained as a dancer and was a graduate of Juilliard School, having studied with Antony Tudor, Jose Limon, and Martha Graham. He also studied theatre at HB Studio under Uta Hagen.

== Career ==
After graduating from Juilliard in 1968, LuPone made his Broadway debut that same year as a dancer in "Noël Coward's Sweet Potato". He featured in three more shows in that same capacity before successfully auditioning for A Chorus Line (1976), having convinced Michael Bennett to let him play the role of the director, Zach. LuPone was nominated for the Tony Award for Best Featured Actor in a Musical, in what proved to be his final dancing role. His later performances included A Thousand Clowns (2001), True West (2000), A View from the Bridge (1997), Late Nite Comic (1987), Saint Joan (1977), and The Magic Show (1974). His numerous off-Broadway performances included Twelfth Night (1980), Black Angel (1982), and Lennon (1982). He also appeared in regional theater. He was the director of the MFA Drama Program at The New School for Drama (New York City) until the spring of 2011.

Together with his former student, Bernie Telsey, LuPone established the Manhattan Class Company in 1986. This eventually became the MCC Theater. As its artistic director, he produced Frozen (2004), Reasons To Be Pretty (2008), and "Hand to God" (2014), all of which were nominated for the Tony Award for Best Play and eventually made their way to Broadway.

On television, LuPone appeared in five episodes of The Sopranos as Dr. Bruce Cusamano, next-door neighbor of the titular Soprano family (1999–2007). He appeared on Law & Order: Criminal Intent for two episodes as Nelson Broome (2003–2009), and on Law & Order: Special Victims Unit for one episode in 2004. He also appeared on All My Children in the 1980s and Guiding Light in the 1990s. He appeared in the pilot episode of the NBC musical series Smash as well as the pilot episode of Showtime's drama Billions.

== Personal life ==
At the time of his death, LuPone was a resident of Athens, New York. He was married to Virginia Robinson until his death. Together, they had one son. His younger sister is actress-singer Patti LuPone.

LuPone died of Pancreatic cancer on August 27, 2022, at a hospice facility in Albany, New York. He was 76.

== Filmography ==
=== Film ===
Year	Title	Role	Notes
1970	Song of Norway	Dancer	Uncredited
1973	Jesus Christ Superstar	James the Apostle	
1989	High Stakes	John Stratton	
1991	The Doors	Music Manager	
1995	A Modern Affair	Ben	
1995	Palookaville	Ralph	
1995	Dead Presidents	Attorney Salvatore Rizzo	
2002	Heartbreak Hospital	Hal	
2004	The Door in the Floor	Mendelssohn	
2004	Indocumentados	Priest	
2005	Come Away with Me	Fred	
2006	Mentor	Franklin Burier	
2007	Then She Found Me	Ted	
2007	Funny Games	Robert Thompson	
2009	Breaking Point	Frank Donnelly	
2013	Isn't It Delicious	Sam Spenser	

=== Television ===
Year	Title	Role	Notes
1976	Rich Man, Poor Man Book II	Dick Barnaby	Episode: "Chapter IX"
1977	The Feather and Father Gang	Choreographer	Episode: "Flight to Mexico"
1979–1980	Ryan's Hope	Chester Wallace	9 episodes
1983	Search for Tomorrow	Tom Bergman #5	77 episodes
1984–1985	All My Children	Zach Grayson	4 episodes
1985–1986	Another World	Neal Cory	7 episodes
1987	CBS Summer Playhouse	Jeffery Sinclair	Episode: "The Saint in Manhattan"
1990	Guiding Light	Leo Flynn	4 episodes
1990, 1994, 1999, 2002	Law & Order	Kurtz / Marc Bransom / Mark Branson / Bill Wendyll	4 episodes
1991–1994	Loving	Leonard Brill / Charley Nichols	24 episodes
1995	Love and Betrayal: The Mia Farrow Story	André Previn	Television film
1996	Swift Justice	Alan Kaufman	Episode: "Out on a Limb"
1999–2006	The Sopranos	Dr. Bruce Cusamano	6 episodes
2000	Sex and the City	Len Schnieder	Episode: "The Big Time"
2000	JAG	Mel Hayden	Episode: "JAG TV"
2000	American Tragedy	Robert Kardashian	Television film
2001	Ally McBeal	Attorney Bjork	Episode: "The Getaway"
2002	Crossing Jordan	DA Curt Schneider	2 episodes
2003, 2009	Law & Order: Criminal Intent	Nelson Broome	2 episodes
2004, 2013, 2019	Law & Order: Special Victims Unit	Paretto / Gabriel Gorromini / Brooks Harmon	3 episodes
2005	Stella	Bob Feldman	Episode: "Campaign"
2006	Conviction	Acting Teacher	Episode: "The Wall"
2009	Royal Pains	Dr. Silver	Episode: "Pilot"
2011	A Gifted Man	Dr. Arnold Soltman	Episode: "Pilot"
2011	Gossip Girl	Dr. Krueger	Episode: "Rhodes to Perdition"
2012	Smash	Jerry's Attorney	Episode: "Pilot"
2014	The Affair	Dennis	2 episodes
2016	Billions	Skip Wolkowska	Episode: "Pilot"
2016	Odd Mom Out	Timberly Crisp	Episode: "Knock of Shame"

=== Stage ===
Year	Title	Role	Notes
1968	Noël Coward's Sweet Potato	Performer	Ethel Barrymore Theatre, Broadway
1970	Minnie's Boys	Acrobat	Imperial Theatre, Broadway
1970	The Rothschilds	Ensemble (Replacement)	Lunt-Fontanne Theatre, Broadway
1974	The Magic Show	Manny	Cort Theatre, Broadway
1975	A Chorus Line	Zach	Sam S. Shubert Theatre, Broadway
1977	Saint Joan	The Dauphin	Circle in the Square Theatre, Broadway
1982	Lennon	Older Lennon	Entermedia Theatre, Off-Broadway
1982	Black Angel	Bob Hawkins/M.P./Third Hooded Man	Circle Repertory Company, Off-Broadway
1987	Late Nite Comic	David Ackerman	Ritz Theatre, Broadway
1990	Zoya's Apartment	Pavel Fyodorovich Abolyaninov	Circle in the Square Theatre, Broadway
1993	The Able-Bodied Seaman	Roy	MCC Theater, Off-Broadway
1997	A View From the Bridge	Alfieri (Replacement)	Criterion Center Stage Right, Broadway
2000	True West	Saul Kimmer	Circle in the Square Theatre, Broadway
2001	A Thousand Clowns	Arnold Burns	Longacre Theatre, Broadway
2017	The Violin	Gio	59E59 Theater, Off-Broadway
2018	Williston	Larry	Miranda Theatre Company, Off-Broadway
