= Alexandra Socha =

American actress (born 1990)

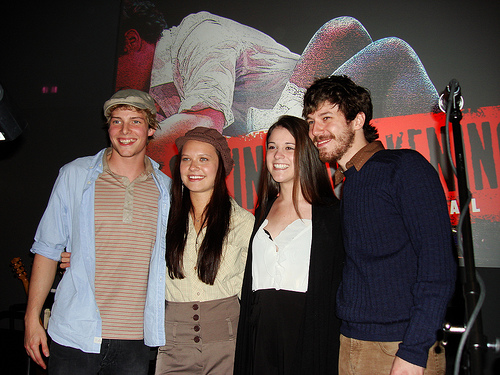
- Alexandra Socha (second from right) with cast of Spring Awakening
- Born: April 10, 1990 (age 36); Nashua, New Hampshire, U.S.
- Occupation: Actress
- Years active: 2006 – present
- Spouse: Etai Benson (m. 2020)
- Children: 1

Alexandra Socha (born April 10, 1990) is an American actress who made her Broadway debut in the rock musical Spring Awakening in May 2008. Other notable stage appearances include Nora in the brief 2009 revival of Brighton Beach Memoirs, Daisy Fenton in the Off-Broadway run of Death Takes a Holiday, as Philoclea in Head over Heels. She was featured in a supporting role in the Amazon comedy TV series Red Oaks.

== Biography ==
Socha was born in Nashua, New Hampshire, where she grew up, the daughter of Joan Storey and Thad Socha. As an only child, she performed with her parents in local community theater shows. She attended Nashua High South graduating in 2008. Socha began to act as a child, joining the Peacock Players of Nashua, where she played Amneris in the musical Aida in 2006. She gained professional experience with the American Stage Festival and The Lyric Stage.

After completing her junior year of high school, Socha made her Broadway debut in Spring Awakening on July 24, 2007. She replaced Krysta Rodriguez as an ensemble member plus understudying the roles of Wendla, Thea, Anna and Martha. On May 20, 2008, Socha replaced Lea Michele taking over the role of Wendla fulltime. She received positive notices in the Daily News and The New York Times. She played out the remainder of the run, and also graduated from Nashua High School in 2008 after completing a home study program. Her next Broadway appearance was the short-lived revival of Brighton Beach Memoirs, which opened on October 25, 2009.

In September 2010, Socha was at the Yale Repertory Theater in "We Have Always Lived in the Castle," a new musical based on the Shirley Jackson novel of the same name . In April 2011, Socha opened in The Dream of the Burning Boy, at the Roundabout Theater Company's Black Box Theater. On July 14, 2011, she opened as Daisy Fenton in Death Takes a Holiday, at the Laura Pels theater. On November 28, 2011, Socha made her solo concert debut at Duplex Cabaret Theatre in New York City with a show entitled Home.

On October 17, 2012, Socha played Medium Alison in a workshop of the musical Fun Home, at The Public Theater in New York. From Sept. 30 – Dec. 1, 2013, Socha originated the role of Medium Alison in the official off-Broadway premiere of Fun Home at The Public Theater in New York. She left the show for personal reasons and was replaced by understudy Emily Skeggs who continued with the remainder of the run and later transferred the show to Broadway.

On television, Socha portrayed Mia in the Showtime series The Big C, made single appearances on White Collar, A Gifted Man, Made in Jersey, Law And Order: SVU, and had a recurring role in the FX series Damages. Socha was a regular cast member in Seasons 1 and 2 in the Amazon Comedy TV series Red Oaks.

In the summer of 2017, Socha returned to the Theater stage originating the role of "Amber" in the world premiere of Anna Ziegler's play Actually. The show had its world premiere at the Williamstown Theatre Festival in Williamstown, Massachusetts. She continued with the show when it transferred Off Broadway to Manhattan Theatre Club's Stage II at New York City Center.

In 2018, Socha returned to Broadway for the first time in 8 years originating the role of Philoclea in Head over Heels, a musical retelling of Sir Philip Sidney's play The Arcadia featuring music of The Go-Go's. For this show, Socha reunited with original Spring Awakening director Michael Mayer and castmate Andrew Durand. Head Over Heels had its world premiere in San Francisco, California at the Curran Theatre from April 10 - May 6, 2018. It officially arrived on Broadway at the Hudson Theatre in the Fall of that same year. Previews began June 23, 2018 and Opening Night was set for July 26, 2018. Socha stayed with the production during its entire Broadway run. The show closed on January 6, 2019.

On March 5, 2024, Socha joined the Broadway cast of Wicked, replacing McKenzie Kurtz in the role of Glinda. She played the role alongside Mary Kate Morrissey as Elphaba. Socha departed the cast in March 2025.

== Personal life ==
Socha met actor Etai Benson in 2011, and they married in 2020. They played lovers Tzeitel and Motel in Paper Mill Playhouse's production of Fiddler on the Roof. They welcomed a son in 2023.

In March 2022, Socha revealed on Instagram that she was given a late diagnosis of ADHD.

In April 2023, Socha revealed on Instagram that she had converted to Judaism.

== Filmography ==
=== Film ===
Year	Title	Role	Notes
2010	Follow Me	Daisy	Short film
2014	Emoticon ;)	Phoebe	
2016	The Broken Ones		

=== Television ===
Year	Title	Role	Notes
2010	White Collar	Lindsay Gless	"Front Man"
2010–2011	The Big C	Mia	Recurring role
2011	A Gifted Man	Chloe Salinger	"In Case of Memory Loss"
2012	Damages	Rachel Walling	Recurring role
2012	Made in Jersey	Ellie Fordham	"Pilot"
2013	Law & Order: Special Victims Unit	Brit Yardley	"Traumatic Wound"
2013	Royal Pains	Molly O'Shea	Recurring role
2014	Blue Bloods	Hannah Lancaster	"Power of the Press"
2014–2017	Red Oaks	Skye	Regular role
2020–2021	For Life	Charlotte	Recurring role
2021	Evil	Fenna	"S is for Silence"
2023	The Marvelous Mrs. Maisel	Esther Maisel	Recurring role; Season 5

=== Theater ===
Year	Title	Role	Notes
2008-2009	Spring Awakening	Wendla (replacement)	Broadway
2009	Brighton Beach Memoirs	Nora Morton	Broadway
2013	Fun Home	Medium Alison	Off-Broadway (The Public Theater)
2015	Paint Your Wagon	Jennifer Rumson	New York City Center Encores!
2018	Hey, Look Me Over!	Mabel	New York City Center Encores!
2018	Head Over Heels	Philoclea	Curran Theatre (out of town tryout)
2018	Head Over Heels	Philoclea	Broadway
2019	Annie Get Your Gun	Annie Oakley	Bay Street Theater
2020	Mack & Mabel	Mabel Normand	New York City Center Encores!
2021	Fiddler on the Roof	Tzeitel	Paper Mill Playhouse
2024-2025	Wicked	Glinda	Broadway
2026	South Pacific	Nellie Forbush	Bucks County Playhouse
