= Late Nite Comic =

Musical

- Music: Brian Gari
- Lyrics: Brian Gari
- Book: Allan Knee
- Productions: 1987 Broadway

Late Night Comic is a stage musical, written by playwright (Allan Knee) and composer/lyricist (Brian Gari). The musical ran for 17 performances on Broadway, in 1987.

== Origins ==
In 1976, singer-songwriter Brian Gari wrote a song entitled “Dance”, inspired by a five-year relationship that he had with a ballet dancer. As he later told a journalist: “'she left dancing, married someone else, had a kid, and lives in Forest Hills – but I haven't gotten her out of my heart". Two years later, Gari came up with the idea of developing the theme into a semi-autobiographical stage musical, concentrating on the relationship between a songwriter, a ballet dancer, and a struggling stand-up comedian who is the songwriter's best friend. Gari wrote the entire first act himself, but the project languished until 1984, when he met an agent who liked the songs and introduced him to playwright Allan Knee as a potential collaborator. Within two years, the show had been substantially rewritten, and now concentrated on the relationship between a stand-up comic and a dancer.

Gari's score incorporated several songs that he had composed many years earlier, including one entitled "The best in the business", which he had written (about the subject of music publishers) as far back as 1972. The title song, "Late Nite Comic", had been written in 1977 for an actual stand-up comic, Larry Cobb, whom Gari knew when they both performed at New York's Comic Strip in the late 1970s.

== Production ==
Dissatisfied with his agent's subsequent lack of enthusiasm, Gari took control of the project himself. He later recalled, "like a fairy tale", the first director and the first producer that he approached both agreed to become involved. The former was Philip Rose, whose previous Broadway musical credits included notable hits such as Purlie and Shenandoah, as well as flops such as Angel and Amen Corner. The producer was 25-year-old Rory Rosegarten, who had an interest in comedy, and although he had recently served as executive producer for a comedy record by David Kolin, had never produced a Broadway musical before (and never would again). It was reported that Rosegarten raised the full production costs of $1.1 million in a single day, when, armed with a copy of the demonstration tape of the score, he visited the office of an anonymous benefactor (described by Rosegarten only as a “wealthy financier”), who promptly agreed to finance the entire production.

For the title role of stand-up comic David Ackerman, the director and producer sought either a stand-up comic who could sing and dance, or an actor who could sing and be funny – someone, as one report suggested, like Robert Lindsay or Jim Dale. When auditions were held in July 1987 (appropriately enough, at the Comic Strip on 81st Street), more than 400 comedians turned up. The part of David was duly filled by Robert LuPone (then best known as Zach from A Chorus Line), with Teresa Tracy cast as his dancer girlfriend, Gabrielle. The remaining minor roles – including various friends, club owners, hookers, and nightclub personnel – were performed by an ensemble of 11 that included future cabaret artiste Michael McAssey.

In an effort to reduce costs, the show premiered at the Garde Theater in New London, Connecticut, on September 9, 1987. At that time, out-of-town tryouts for Broadway-bound musicals were no longer commonplace (as they had been in the 1950s and '60s), but the American Musical Theater, a non profit organization based in New London's Garde Theater, was hoping to reinstate the practice to revitalize theatre in New York. During the 11 days that Late Nite Comic played in New London, numerous major revisions were made to the show. The original opening number, "Stand up" was moved to later in the first act; another song, "When I am movin'" was expanded, and the lyrics to several others were rewritten. Towards the end of the New London run, the song "Nothing's changing this love" was replaced by "Having Someone", although the latter would not be orchestrated until the show reached New York. Further changes took place during rehearsals at 890 Broadway, including the excision of a song entitled "I live in L.A.". After previews opened on October 2, the title song was cut from the show, only to be reinstated, at Gari's strong insistence, on the night of the official Broadway opening. By that time, director Philip Rose (who suggested many of the revisions) had dissociated himself from the production, and requested that his name be removed from the credits.

The show opened at the Ritz Theatre on October 15, 1987, and closed two days later after only four performances. An unflattering review in The New York Times asserted that: Late Nite Comic has no sense of direction. It also has no sense of book or score. In the course of the show, the hero moves all the way from the Krazy Korn Klub to a tinseled stage in Las Vegas. The audience is asked to believe that in his rise to fame, he has sharpened his comedy act and earned his success. Although the jokes are just as dreadful in the end as in the beginning, when he becomes a success more people on stage laugh at him. This is a musical comedy about a stand-up comic in which the hero tells not a single funny joke.

== Recordings ==
As the Broadway production ran for only 17 performances, an original cast album seemed unlikely to ever be recorded. However, Gari subsequently negotiated with record producer Bruce Yeko, whose label, Original Cast Records, specialized in preserving the scores of short-lived or otherwise little-known stage musicals. Gari proposed a studio cast recording in which, as he later stated in the sleeve notes, "I will try to present the songs as they were originally written and intended". The album was co-produced by Brian Gari and producer/arranger Lee Shapiro, a former member of Frankie Valli's Four Seasons. Shapiro also provided new orchestrations for the recording, in the absence of the show's original arranger, Larry Hochman. Intended as a studio recording rather than an original cast album, the songs were mostly performed by Gari himself, along with Julie Budd, Robin Kaiser, and Michael McAssey (who had been in the ensemble of the ill-fated Broadway production). The recording sessions took place in March 1988 in Lee Shapiro's Synclavier Studios in New York City. The LP was released later that year, and subsequently reissued on compact disc (on the same label) in 1989.

In 1992, Brian Gari released a solo album, also on the Original Cast label, entitled Songs from Future Musicals, which included three songs that had been cut from the Broadway production of Late Nite Comic.

In 2007, the 20th anniversary of the original Broadway production was marked by the release of a new studio recording performed by an all-star cast that included Tony Roberts, Rupert Holmes, Chip Zien, Karen Ziemba, Liz Callaway, and Jason Graae. This recording used Larry Hochman's original orchestrations, and included several cut songs among 23 total tracks.

== Legacy ==
In 2006, the saga of Late Nite Comic and its tortuous route to Broadway, became the subject of a book written by Brian Gari, entitled We Bombed in New London. To mark the 20th anniversary in 2007, a special event was held at New York's Drama Book Shop, attended by Brian Gari, Allan Knee, and former original cast member Michael McAssey, where songs from the show were performed and copies of the libretto and CD were autographed.
