= Etai Benson =

American actor

Etai Benson is an actor best known for his Broadway career. His Broadway credits include Company, The Band's Visit, and Wicked.

== Early life and education ==
Benson trained at Stagedoor and the Moscow Art Theatre School. He attended the University of Michigan.

== Career ==
Benson made his Broadway debut as Boq in Wicked.

Benson joined the Broadway cast of The Band's Visit in 2017, originating the role of Papi. He won a Grammy for the original cast album.

In July 2019, Benson played Nate in an industry presentation of The Devil Wears Prada alongside Emily Skinner and Krystina Alabado.

In October 2019, producers announced that Benson would play Paul in a revival of Company. His casting was notable given that the role of Jamie was gender-swapped for this production; Matt Doyle portrayed Jamie. The show began previews but the opening was postponed because of the COVID-19 pandemic. In November 2021, Benson reassumed his role as Paul in Company.

In 2023, Benson played Motel in the Paper Mill Playhouse production of Fiddler on the Roof.

Benson starred as Seymour in the Ogunquit Playhouse production of Little Shop of Horrors in 2024; his costars included Talia Suskauer and Latrice Royale.

In 2025, Benson joined the cast of Wonderful Town at New York City Center Encores! as Frank Lippencott.

== Personal life ==
Benson is married to fellow Wicked actress Alexandra Socha; together they have a child. He is Jewish and identifies as Israeli-American.

Prior to 2017, he was credited as Etai BenShlomo.
