= Cupid & Cate =

- Genre: Romantic drama
- Based on: Cupid and Diana by Christina Bartolomeo
- Teleplay by: Jennifer Miller; Ron Raley
- Directed by: Brent Shields
- Starring: Mary-Louise Parker; Peter Gallagher
- Music by: Mark Adler
- Country of origin: United States
- Original language: English

Production
- Executive producer: Richard Welsh
- Producer: Timothy M. Bourne
- Cinematography: Kees Van Oostrum
- Editor: Scott Vickrey
- Running time: 100 minutes
- Production company: Hallmark Hall of Fame Productions

Original release
- Network: CBS
- Release: May 7, 2000

Cupid & Cate is a 2000 American romantic drama television film directed by Brent Shields and written by Jennifer Miller and Ron Raley, based on the 1998 novel Cupid and Diana by Christina Bartolomeo. It stars Mary-Louise Parker and Peter Gallagher, with Bebe Neuwirth, Philip Bosco, Joanna Going, David Lansbury, Rebecca Luker, and Brenda Fricker in supporting roles.

Cupid & Cate aired on CBS on May 7, 2000, as an episode of the Hallmark Hall of Fame series.

== Plot ==
Cate De Angelo is the youngest sibling of an Italian-American family in Washington, D.C. She runs a struggling vintage clothing store, and clashes with her father Dominic, who often points out her lack of success compared to her three sisters. Her relationship with her fiancé Philip is stable, but lacks passion. Her sister Francesca decides to play Cupid and introduces her to Harry Dietrich, a charming lawyer from New York City. He shows her how to relax and enjoy life.

Cate falls in love with Harry, whom she marries. However, Harry gets cancer. The treatment attempts are not working. At times, Harry's condition worsens so much that he goes to the hospital.

Cate and her sisters argue with Dominic over whether he loved their late mother. Cate later reconciles with Dominic.

== Cast ==
- Mary-Louise Parker as Cate De Angelo
- Peter Gallagher as Harry Dietrich
- Bebe Neuwirth as Francesca
- Philip Bosco as Dominic De Angelo
- Joanna Going as Cynthia
- David Lansbury as Philip
- Rebecca Luker as Annette
- Brenda Fricker as Willie Hendley
- Peter McRobbie as Dr. Brimmer
- Kurt McKinney as Simon

== Production ==
Filming took place in Washington, D.C., including Georgetown and Adams Morgan. On October 27, 1999, filming took place on Market and King Streets in Leesburg, Virginia. Nearly a third of the film was shot in a Falls Church, Virginia house, used as Dominic's home, from November 8 to 13, 1999.
