= Sleeping Beauty Wakes =

Sleeping Beauty Wakes is a musical with book by Rachel Sheinkin, who won a Tony Award for The 25th Annual Putnam County Spelling Bee, and a pop score by composer Brendan Milburn and lyricist Valerie Vigoda, two members of the indie music trio GrooveLily. The show is a twist on the classic Charles Perrault fairy tale of Sleeping Beauty. In this modern-day version, Rose is brought to a sleep-disorder clinic to wake her from her 900-year nap.

The musical was presented from March 31 to May 20, 2007 at the Kirk Douglas Theater of the Center Theatre Group in Los Angeles, California as a co-production with Deaf West Theater. It was directed and choreographed by Jeff Calhoun. In the spring of 2011, the McCarter Theatre in Princeton, New Jersey staged a revised version of the show directed by Rebecca Taichman, which removed all the Deaf elements. The version of the show also ran at the La Jolla Playhouse in San Diego, California in the summer of 2011, as a co-production with the McCarter.

The Center Theatre Group/Deaf West co-production received generally positive reviews and was ultimately honored with 10 Ovation Award nominations, winning in 2 categories.

In his review of the 2007 production in Variety, Bob Verini had only positive things to say about the performances, particularly singling out "Faye Dunaway look-alike Deanne Bray and superb singing partner Erika Amato," but felt that "it's the narrative that suffers from a split-personality disorder."

The Los Angeles Times review of the 2011 La Jolla production found Charles McNulty praising the show for "freely mix[ing] medical science with pixie dust" and said that "the inherent charm of the piece captivates our imagination even as the flaws peek through", but finally wrote that "the show's ambition [to be the next Wicked] seems to be pulling the work away from its strength as a musical comedy chamber piece. The enchantment is visible, but too much of it remains trapped in a glass case, like a waxwork Sleeping Beauty at a theme park."
