= Larry Hochman =

American orchestrator and composer (born 1953)

- Born: November 21, 1953 (age 72); Paterson, New Jersey
- Occupations: Orchestrator and composer
- Spouse: Diane Hochman
- Children: 3
- Awards: Tony Award; Daytime Emmy Awards

Larry Hochman (/ˈhɒkmən/; born November 21, 1953) is an American orchestrator and composer. He has won four Emmy Awards for his original music on the TV series Wonder Pets! and a Tony Award for his orchestrations for The Book of Mormon.

== Early life and training ==
He studied music theory and composition at Manhattan School of Music, Eastman School of Music, and Mannes College of Music.

== Career ==
Hochman's musical One Man Band, for which he wrote the score with Marc Elliot, was produced off-Broadway in 1985, and was later staged at the Coconut Grove Playhouse in Florida. The New York Times reviewer wrote, "The 10 musical numbers, written by Marc Elliot and Larry Hochman, and Mr. Elliot's lyrics for the songs, move the story along and provide some good comic effects...[there are] some old-fashioned songs in the show that you find yourself humming afterward, and a few stay with you a long time."

In 1987, Hochman worked on the short-lived Broadway stage musical Late Nite Comic as orchestrator and musical arranger. Though his arrangements were not recorded on the cast recording in March 1988, they are heard on the 25th Anniversary recording. Hochman has provided additional orchestrations for the Broadway musicals The Little Mermaid, Prince of Central Park, and The Music Man, among others. He served as orchestrator for Spamalot, which garnered him a Tony Award nomination for Best Orchestrations, as did A Class Act in 2001 and the 2004 revival of Fiddler on the Roof.

Working with Danny Troob, he composed additional music for Disney's Little Mermaid II. Hochman has composed and arranged music for two episodes of Steven Spielberg's Amazing Stories, the TV documentaries Views of a Vanishing Frontier and Yad Vashem, and the films Not for Publication, The Watchman, and Alaska: Spirit of the Wild. He also co-orchestrated (with John DuPrez) the comic oratorio Not the Messiah (He's a Very Naughty Boy) for Eric Idle and John Du Prez.

His musical adaptation of Gaston Leroux's 1910 novel The Phantom of the Opera (not to be confused with Andrew Lloyd Webber's stage version) toured North America in 1990, receiving positive reviews. In 1996, Hochman wrote "A Sondheim Medley", which was later authorized by Mr. Sondheim. Hochman's song, "Rising Like The Sun", was performed at the opening ceremony for America's Millennium in Washington, DC.

He provided orchestrations for the 2004 premiere of Frank Loesser's Señor Discretion Himself at the Arena Stage in Washington, DC. Hochman also orchestrated Marvin Hamlisch's score for the 2009 film The Informant!. Hochman has arranged music for concerts for Paul McCartney, Eric Idle, Mandy Patinkin, Stephen Sondheim, Audra McDonald, Brian Stokes Mitchell, Barry Manilow, Maury Yeston, Marvin Hamlisch, Hugh Jackman, Betty Buckley, Marin Mazzie & Jason Danieley, the Boston Pops Orchestra, the San Francisco Symphony Orchestra and the New York Philharmonic.

In 2010, Hochman provided orchestrations for the musicals The Addams Family and The Scottsboro Boys and the video game Sonic Colors. Later projects include The Book of Mormon (for which Hochman won Tony and Drama Desk Awards), and Death Takes A Holiday (the 2011 musical by Maury Yeston, Peter Stone and Tom Meehan). In 2014, Hochman orchestrated the Colombian musical Por siempre Navidad by María Isabel Murillo. It was directed by British choreographer and director Mitch Sebastian and repeated in 2015 due to its enormous success. In 2022, he orchestrated Maury Yeston's December Songs, which was recorded by Victoria Clark.

== Personal life ==
He resides in Fair Lawn, New Jersey, with his wife, Diane, twins Brian and Sarah, and daughter Laurie.

== Theatre Credits ==
Year	Production	Role	Venue	Ref.
1979	My Old Friends	Conductor/Pianist	Broadway, 22 Steps	
1979	A Kurt Weill Concert	Pianist	Broadway, Bijou Theatre	
1982	Do Black Patent Leather Shoes Really Reflect Up?	Musical Director, Vocal Arrangements	Broadway, Alvin Theatre	
1987	Late Nite Comic	Orchestrator	Broadway, Ritz Theatre	
1988	Michael Feinstein in Concert	Additional orchestrations	Broadway, Booth Theatre	
1989	Prince of Central Park	Additional orchestrations	Broadway, Belasco Theatre	
1997	King David	Additional orchestrations	Broadway, New Amsterdam Theatre	
1999	The Gershwins' Fascinating Rhythm	Orchestrator	Broadway, Longacre Theatre	
2000	The Music Man	Additional orchestrations	Broadway, Neil Simon Theatre	
2000	Jane Eyre	Orchestrator	Broadway, Brooks Atkinson Theatre	
2001	A Class Act	Orchestrator	Ambassador Theatre	
2004	Fiddler on the Roof	Additional orchestrations	Broadway, Minskoff Theatre	
2005	Spamalot	Orchestrator	Broadway, Shubert Theatre	
2008	The Little Mermaid	Additional orchestrations	Broadway, Lunt-Fontanne Theatre	
2010	The Addams Family	Orchestrator	Broadway, Lunt-Fontanne Theatre	
2010	The Scottsboro Boys	Orchestrator	Broadway, Lyceum Theatre	
2011	The Book of Mormon	Orchestrator	Broadway, Eugene O'Neill Theatre	
2011	Hugh Jackman: Back on Broadway	Orchestrator, arranger	Broadway, Broadhurst Theatre	
2012	Chaplin	Orchestrator	Broadway, Ethel Barrymore Theatre	
2013	Rodgers and Hammerstein's Cinderella	Additional orchestrations	Broadway, Broadway Theatre	
2013	Pippin	Orchestrator	Broadway, Music Box Theatre	
2013	Big Fish	Orchestrator	Broadway, Neil Simon Theatre	
2014	Aladdin	Additional orchestrations	Broadway, New Amsterdam Theatre	
2015	On The Twentieth Century	Orchestrator	Broadway, American Airlines Theatre	
2015	Something Rotten!	Orchestrator	Broadway, St. James Theatre	
2015	The Visit	Orchestrator	Broadway, Lyceum Theatre	
2016	She Loves Me	Orchestrator	Broadway, Studio 54	
2017	Hello, Dolly!	Orchestrator	Broadway, Shubert Theatre	
2018	The Prom	Orchestrator	Broadway, Longacre Theatre	
2019	Kiss Me, Kate	Orchestrator	Broadway, Studio 54	
2023	Spamalot	Orchestrator	Broadway, St. James Theatre	

== Awards and nominations ==
Year	Award	Category	Work	Result
1985	ASCAP Award	Musical Theatre	One Man Band	Won
1985	Bistro Award	Composing	One Man Band	Nominated
2001	Tony Award	Best Orchestrations	A Class Act	Nominated
2004	Tony Award	Best Orchestrations	Fiddler on the Roof	Nominated
2005	Drama Desk Award	Outstanding Orchestrations	Spamalot	Nominated
2005	Tony Award	Best Orchestrations	Spamalot	Nominated
2008	Emmy Award	Outstanding Achievement in Music	The Wonder Pets	Won
2009	Emmy Award	Outstanding Achievement in Music	The Wonder Pets	Won
2010	Emmy Award	Outstanding Achievement in Music	The Wonder Pets	Won
2010	Emmy Award	Outstanding Original Song for Children's and Animation Program	The Wonder Pets (co-composed with Jerry Bock)	Won
2010	Drama Desk Award	Outstanding Orchestrations	The Scottsboro Boys	Nominated
2011	Drama Desk Award	Outstanding Orchestrations	The Book of Mormon	Won
2011	Tony Award	Best Orchestrations	'The Book of Mormon	Won
2011	Tony Award	Best Orchestrations	The Scottsboro Boys	Nominated
2016	Drama Desk Award	Outstanding Orchestrations	She Loves Me	Won
2016	Tony Award	Best Orchestrations	She Loves Me	Nominated
2017	Tony Award	Best Orchestrations	Hello, Dolly!	Nominated
