= Striking 12 =

Studio album by GrooveLily
- Genre: Musical

Striking 12 is the music group GrooveLily's off-Broadway holiday musical, based in part on Hans Christian Andersen's 1845 story "The Little Match Girl". The cast recording was released in 2004 by PS Classics.

== Track listing ==
1. Violin Ascension
2. Overture
3. "Thank You Very Much And Welcome..."
4. Snow Song (It's Coming Down)
5. "Our Story Begins With A Man..."
6. Last Day Of The Year
7. Resolution
8. "And So, The Man Resolves..."
9. The Sales Pitch
10. "But The Woman Is Gone..."
11. "It Was Terribly Cold..."
12. Matches For Sale
13. Say What?
14. "Lights Were Shining From Every Window..."
15. Hey La La
16. Fine, Fine, Fine
17. "She Had Drawn Her Little Feet Under Her..."
18. Can't Go Home
19. "Her Little Hands Were Almost Frozen..."
20. "The Burning Match Gave Off A Warm Bright Light..."
21. Visions In The Matchlight
22. "Someone Is Dying..."
23. Give The Drummer Some Lovin'
24. "The Girl, When We Left Her..."
25. Caution To The Wind
26. Violin Ascension
27. "The Grandmother Took The Little Girl"
28. Screwed-Up People Make Great Art
29. "Thank You For The Dissertation, Pal..."
30. It's Not All Right
31. "Excuse Me, Little Match Girl?..."
32. Snow Song (Reprise)/First Day Of The Year
33. Encore (The Little Drummer Boy)
