= Victoria Clark =

American musical theatre actress

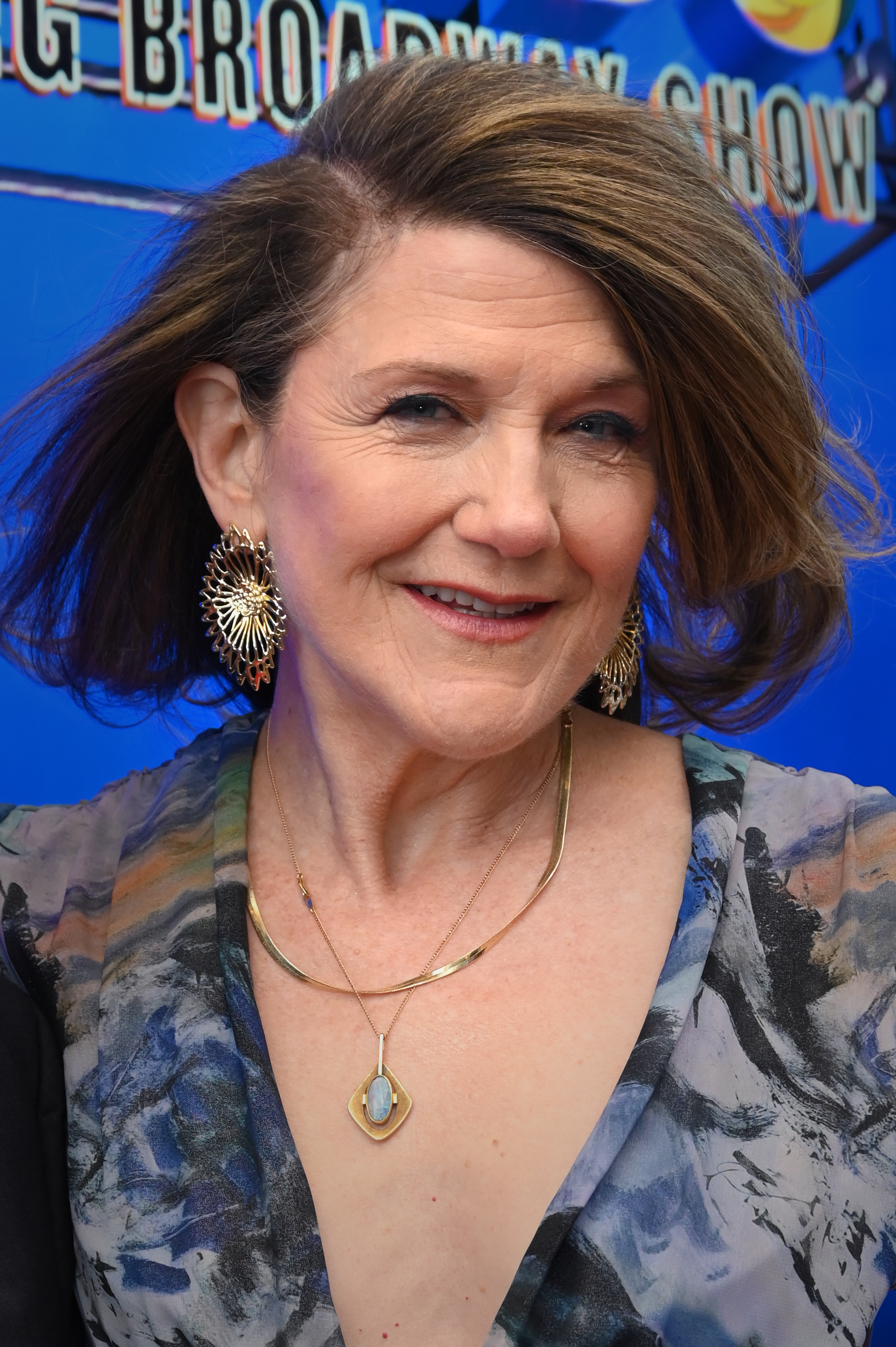
- Clark in 2025
- Born: Dallas, Texas, U.S.
- Education: Yale University (BA); New York University (MFA)
- Occupations: Actress, singer, director
- Years active: 1975–present
- Spouse: Thomas Reidy (m. 2015)
- Children: 1
- Website: VictoriaClark.me

Victoria Clark is an American actress, musical theatre soprano, and director. Clark has performed in numerous Broadway musicals and in other theatre, film and television works. Her voice can also be heard on various cast albums and in several animated films. In 2008, she released her first solo album titled Fifteen Seconds of Grace. A five-time Tony Award nominee, Clark won her first Tony Award for Best Actress in a Musical in 2005 for The Light in the Piazza. She also won the Drama Desk Award, Outer Critics Circle Award, and the Joseph Jefferson Award for the role. She won a second Tony Award for Best Actress in a Musical in 2023 for Kimberly Akimbo.

== Life and career ==
Clark was born and raised in Dallas, Texas, the daughter of Lorraine and Banks Clark.

At Yale, at the age of eighteen, she sang the role of Mabel in Gilbert and Sullivan's comic opera The Pirates of Penzance. She also sang the title role in Gilbert and Sullivan's Patience, and directed a production of Ruddigore for the Yale Gilbert & Sullivan Society. After college, Clark studied at New York University's Musical Theatre Master's Program at Tisch as a stage director and began to direct operas and musicals professionally. Although she continues to direct, she has primarily focused on singing and acting.

Clark's stage work includes understudying in the original Broadway production of Sunday in the Park with George (she never went on) and roles in the Broadway musicals Guys and Dolls (1992–93), A Grand Night for Singing (1993–94), How to Succeed in Business Without Really Trying (1995–96, as Smitty), Titanic (1997–99, creating the role of Alice Beane), Cabaret (1999–2000, as Fraulein Kost) and Urinetown (2003, as Penelope Pennywise), as well as numerous roles Off-Broadway, in national tours and in regional theatre. She played Doris MacAfee in the City Center Encores! production of Bye Bye Birdie in 2004.

In 2005, Clark won the Tony Award for Best Leading Actress in a Musical, a Drama Desk Award, an Outer Critics Circle Award, and the Joseph Jefferson Award for her performance in the musical The Light in the Piazza (2005–06). Broadway.com commented on Clark's performance, "What is indisputable is that Victoria Clark has created a character for the ages. Lucas has done a superb job in fleshing out Margaret within the confines of a musical-theater libretto, and Clark responds with consummate precision and grace. Calling hers the musical performance of the year would be accurate. It would also be a drastic understatement." She appeared as former showgirl Sally Durant Plummer in the Encores! staged concert presentation of Follies in February 2007 at City Center. She next created the role of Margaret Brennan in The Marriage of Bette and Boo Off-Broadway in 2008 for the Roundabout Theatre Company.

Clark appeared in Prayer for My Enemy, a new play by Craig Lucas Off-Broadway at Playwrights Horizons from November 14 through December 21, 2008. The play concerned the consequences that the Iraq war has had on an American family, co-starred Michele Pawk and Jonathan Groff, and was directed by Bartlett Sher.

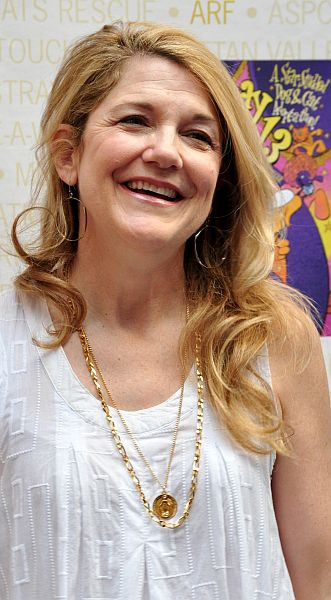
Victoria Clark attends 13th Annual Broadway Barks Benedict at Shubert Alley, New York City in July 2011

Clark has also appeared in movies, sung in several animated feature films, and appeared in roles in television episodes. She can be heard on a number of Broadway cast albums and other recordings. In 2008 she released her first solo album, Fifteen Seconds of Grace, produced by PS Classics. Clark teaches voice and studies acting at the Michael Howard Studios and voice with Edward Sayegh. Clark received the 2006 Distinguished Artist Award from the New York Singing Teachers' Association.

Clark played the Mother Superior in the Broadway production of Sister Act, which opened on April 20, 2011. For this role she was nominated for the Tony Award for Best Featured Actress in a Musical. Clark portrayed Sally in the Kennedy Center/Broadway production of Follies, running at the Center Theatre Group/Ahmanson Theatre, Los Angeles, from May 3 through June 9, 2012.

In 2013, Clark starred in the Manhattan Theatre Club's production of The Snow Geese by Sharr White alongside Mary-Louise Parker and Danny Burstein. Previously, she starred as Marie/the Fairy Godmother in the Broadway production of Cinderella. For this role, she received her second Tony Award nomination for Best Featured Actress in a Musical. She returned to the Broadway production of Cinderella for a run lasting from January to September 2014. In December 2014 Clark appeared as Carrie Mathison's mother on the Season 4 finale of Showtime's series Homeland. Clark played Mamita in the Broadway revival of Gigi, which opened in April 2015. For this performance, Clark received another nomination for the Tony Award for Best Featured Actress in a Musical.

In 2017, Clark appeared in the title role of Sousatzka in Toronto. It was intended to be a pre-Broadway tryout for controversial producer Garth Drabinsky. In 2022, she recorded Maury Yeston's December Songs, featuring orchestration by Larry Hochman.

After persuasion from longtime friend and composer Jeanine Tesori, Clark first donned the candy necklace and late 90s fashion of the title role of Kimberly Akimbo in its acclaimed and extended 2021 Off-Broadway run at the Linda Gross Theatre, produced by the Atlantic Theater Company, for which she garnered Lucille Lortel and Outer Critics Circle Awards. The musical debuted on Broadway in 2022, winning Clark her second Tony Award.

In 2025, Clark joined the cast of The Gilded Age as Joan Carlton.

== Personal life ==
Clark married Thomas Reidy on August 1, 2015, in North Carolina. Her son is from her previous marriage.

== Filmography ==
Film
Year	Title	Role	Notes
1996	The Hunchback of Notre Dame	Chorus (singing voice)	
1997	Beauty and the Beast: The Enchanted Christmas	Chorus (singing voice)	Direct-to-video
1997	Anastasia	Ensemble and Character Vocals (voice)	
1999	Cradle Will Rock	Dulce Fox	
2008	The Happening	Nursery Owner's Wife	
2009	Tickling Leo	Madeline Pikler	
2010	Harvest	Anna Monopoli	
2010	Main Street	Miriam	
2011	Dirty Movie	Teacher	
2012	Archaeology of a Woman	Kate	

Television
Year	Title	Role	Notes
1975	My Father's House	Zozo	TV film
1998	Law & Order	Detective	Episode: "Bait"
2003	Law & Order: Special Victims Unit	Margaret Melia	Episode: "Choice"
2006	Live from Lincoln Center	Margaret Johnson / Herself	Episode: "The Light in the Piazza"
2009	Mercy	Mrs. Simanski	Episode: "You Lost Me with the Cinderblock"
2001	Sweeney Todd: The Demon Barber of Fleet Street in Concert	Beggar Woman	TV film
2013	Late Show with David Letterman	Fairy Godmother	Season 20, episode 125
2014	Homeland	Ellen Mathison	Episode: "Long Time Coming"
2016	The Good Wife	Shannon Janderman	Episode: "Verdict"
2018	The Truth About the Harry Quebert Affair	Adult Jenny Quinn	10 episodes
2019–2020	Almost Family	Diane Doyle	8 episodes
2020	Little America	Tracy	Episode: "The Jaguar"
2020	One Royal Holiday	Queen Gabriella	TV film
2021	Pose	Vanessa	Episode: "Series Finale (Part I)"
2021	The Blacklist	Mrs. French	2 episodes
2025	Elsbeth	Deborah Jordan	Episode: "Tearjerker"
2025	The Gilded Age	Joan Carlton	2 episodes

== Stage credits ==
Theatre
Year	Title	Role	Notes
1986	Cats	Jellylorum	First US National Tour
1987	Les Misérables	Madame Thénardier	First US National Tour
1988	Splendora	Performer	New York
1989	The Secret Garden	Martha Sowerby	Virginia Stage Company
1992	Guys and Dolls	Martha u/s Miss Adelaide	Broadway
1993	A Grand Night for Singing	Performer	Broadway
1995	How to Succeed in Business Without Really Trying	Smitty	Broadway
1997	Titanic	Alice Beane	Broadway
1999	Cabaret	Fräulein Kost; Fritzie	Broadway
2001	Sweeney Todd: The Demon Barber of Fleet Street	Beggar Woman	Concert
2003	Urinetown	Penelope Pennywise	Broadway
2003	Baby	Arlene McNally	New York
2004	Bye Bye Birdie	Doris MacAfee	Encores! Concert
2004	The Light in the Piazza	Margaret Johnson	Chicago
2005	The Light in the Piazza	Margaret Johnson	Broadway
2007	Follies	Sally	Encores! Concert
2008	The Marriage of Bette and Boo	Margaret Brennan	Off-Broadway
2008	Prayer for My Enemy	Dolores	Off-Broadway
2009	Love, Loss, and What I Wore	Performer	Off-Broadway
2010	When the Rain Stops Falling	Gabrielle York	Off-Broadway
2011	Sister Act	Mother Superior	Broadway
2012	Follies	Sally	Ahmanson Theatre
2013	Rodgers + Hammerstein's Cinderella	Marie	Broadway
2013	The Snow Geese	Clarissa Hohmann	Broadway
2015	Gigi	Inez Alvarez	Kennedy Center; Broadway
2017	Sousatzka	Madame Sousatzka	Toronto
2017	Assassins	Sara Jane Moore	Encores!
2017	Damn Yankees	Meg Boyd	Concert
2017	The Trouble with Doug	Director	Fredericia Theatre, Denmark
2019	Lady in the Dark	Liza Elliott	New York City Center
2021	Kimberly Akimbo	Kimberly Levaco	Off-Broadway
2022	Kimberly Akimbo	Kimberly Levaco	Broadway
2025	Love Life	Director	Encores!
2025	Punch	Joan	Broadway

== Awards and nominations ==
Year	Award	Category	Nominated work	Result
2005	Tony Award	Best Actress in a Musical	The Light in the Piazza	Won
2005	Drama Desk Award	Outstanding Actress in a Musical	The Light in the Piazza	Won
2005	Outer Critics Circle Award	Outstanding Actress in a Musical	The Light in the Piazza	Won
2005	Drama League Award	Distinguished Performance	The Light in the Piazza	Nominated
2010	Drama Desk Award	Outstanding Featured Actress in a Play	When the Rain Stops Falling	Nominated
2011	Tony Award	Best Featured Actress in a Musical	Sister Act	Nominated
2011	Drama Desk Award	Outstanding Featured Actress in a Musical	Sister Act	Nominated
2011	Outer Critics Circle Award	Outstanding Actress in a Musical	Sister Act	Nominated
2011	Drama League Award	Distinguished Performance	Sister Act	Nominated
2013	Tony Award	Best Featured Actress in a Musical	Rodgers + Hammerstein's Cinderella	Nominated
2013	Outer Critics Circle Award	Outstanding Featured Actress in a Musical	Rodgers + Hammerstein's Cinderella	Nominated
2015	Tony Award	Best Featured Actress in a Musical	Gigi	Nominated
2015	Outer Critics Circle Award	Outstanding Featured Actress in a Musical	Gigi	Nominated
2022	Drama Desk Award	Outstanding Actress in a Musical	Kimberly Akimbo	Nominated
2022	Lucille Lortel Awards	Outstanding Leading Performer in a Musical	Kimberly Akimbo	Won
2022	Outer Critics Circle Award	Outstanding Actress in a Musical	Kimberly Akimbo	Won
2022	Drama League Award	Distinguished Performance	Kimberly Akimbo	Nominated
2023	Tony Award	Best Actress in a Musical	Kimberly Akimbo	Won
2023	Dorian Award	Outstanding Lead Performance in a Broadway Musical	Kimberly Akimbo	Won
2024	Grammy Awards	Best Musical Theater Album	Kimberly Akimbo	Nominated
