= GrooveLily =

American musical trio

GrooveLily is an American musical trio based in New York City notable for creative songwriting in different pop genres, such as rock, folk, jazz, and show tune. The band consists of Valerie Vigoda and Brendan Milburn along with Gene Lewin. A report in The New York Times in 2004 described the group as an "up and coming trio". According to Variety, GrooveLily was founded by Vigoda.

A review of their 2006 performance of A Midsummer Night's Dream described their show as having "plenty of fun" with "original music" from GrooveLily, but noted problems with acoustics. In 2008, Milburn & Vigoda wrote seven musical numbers for the Disney Wonder cruise ship production of Toy Story: The Musical. In 2002 (and in subsequent years, opening off-Broadway in 2006), GrooveLily performed a holiday musical entitled Striking 12. A Washington Post reviewer described it as an "engaging concert-style entertainment" and fusion of "cabaret act and chamber musical". Milburn & Vigoda wrote the book, music and lyrics along with Rachel Sheinkin. Variety gave Striking 12 a mixed review, saying the show's "lame wit obscures its moments of beauty" and that the trio's "politeness hinders the supposedly rebellious humor."

After years of very few GrooveLily performances, the band came together to write and perform a musical called Wheelhouse about their earlier touring career on the road in a Winnebago and why they stopped touring largely because of that experience. The show premiered at TheatreWorks Silicon Valley June 6, 2012.

== Albums ==
Title	Year	Label	Other Artist(s)
Inhabit My Heart	1994	QMR Records	GrooveLily
Jungle & Sky	1996	QMR Records	GrooveLily
Brendan & The Extenuating Circumstances	1998	QMR Records	GrooveLily
Little Light	2000	QMR Records	GrooveLily
Folk Appetizer	2001	QMR Records	GrooveLily
Just The Three Of Us	2002	QMR Records	GrooveLily
The Nutshell EP	2002	QMR Records	GrooveLily
Are We There Yet?	2003	QMR Records	GrooveLily
Striking 12	2005	PS Classics	GrooveLily
A Little Midsummer Night's Music	2007	PS Classics	GrooveLily
Sleeping Beauty Wakes	2009	PS Classics	GrooveLily
Warner-Chappell Demos 2010	2010	Warner/Chappell	GrooveLily
Striking 12: Bonus Tracks	2010	PS Classics	GrooveLily
Sleeping Beauty Wakes: La Jolla Playhouse Bonus Tracks	2011	PS Classics	GrooveLily
Wheelhouse	2013	Independent	GrooveLily
While You Were Out	2013	Independent	GrooveLily
