= Maury Yeston =

American classical and theatre composer, lyricist and music theorist (born 1945)

- Born: October 23, 1945 (age 80); Jersey City, New Jersey, U.S.
- Education: Yale University, University of Cambridge
- Occupations: Composer, Lyricist, Musicologist
- Spouse: Julianne Waldhelm
- Website: mauryyeston.com

Maury Yeston (born October 23, 1945) is an American composer, lyricist and music theorist.

Yeston has written the music and lyrics for several Broadway musicals and is also a classical orchestral and ballet composer. Among his Broadway musicals are Nine in 1982, Titanic in 1997, for both of which he won Tony Awards for Best Musical and Best Score and was nominated for Grammy Awards, and Grand Hotel in 1989, for which he was nominated for a Tony Award for best score and two Drama Desk Awards for his music and lyrics. He composed, in addition, the incidental music for the Broadway production of The Royal Family in 2009. He received a third Grammy nomination for the revival of Nine in 2004, which won a Tony Award for Best revival of a musical. He also was nominated for an Academy Award and a Golden Globe for two of his new songs in the film version of Nine (Take It All and Cinema Italiano).

His musical version of the novel The Phantom of the Opera, titled Phantom (1991), has received more than 1,000 productions worldwide. His off-Broadway musicals include Death Takes a Holiday (2011), nominated for eleven Drama Desk Awards and the Revue Anything Can Happen in the Theatre. His classical works include the song cycle December Songs; An American Cantata (a three movement choral symphony); Tom Sawyer: A Ballet in Three Acts; a Cello Concerto, premiered by Yo-Yo Ma; and other pieces for chamber ensembles and solo piano.

Earlier in his career Yeston was Associate Professor of Music and Director of Undergraduate Studies in Music at Yale University for eight years, authoring two scholarly books on music theory published by Yale University Press (The Stratification of Musical Rhythm and Readings in Schenker Analysis), and subsequently presided over and taught the BMI Lehman Engel Musical Theater Workshop in New York City for more than two decades beginning in 1982. Yeston has won two Tony Awards, two Drama Desk Awards and an Olivier Award, and was inducted into The American Theater Hall of Fame in 2023.

== Life and career ==
=== Early years ===
Yeston was born in Jersey City, New Jersey. His father, David, was born in London, England, and founded the Dial Import Corporation, an importing and exporting firm, which his mother, Frances née Haar, helped to run. Yeston stated in a 1997 interview: "My mother was trained in classical piano, and her father was a cantor in a synagogue. A lot of musical theatre writers have something in common. Irving Berlin, Harold Arlen, Kurt Weill – each one had a cantor in the family. When you take a young, impressionable child and put him at age three in the middle of a synagogue, and that child sees a man in a costume, dramatically raised up on a kind of stage, singing his heart out at the top of his lungs to a rapt congregation, it makes a lasting impression." At age five, Yeston began taking piano lessons from his mother, and by age seven he had won an award for composition. He attended the Yeshiva of Hudson County through grade eight. Yeston's interest in musical theatre began at age ten when his mother took him to see My Fair Lady on Broadway. At Jersey Academy, a small private high school in Jersey City, Yeston broadened his musical study beyond classical and religious music and Broadway show tunes to include jazz, folk, rock and roll, and early music. He took up folk guitar, played vibraphone with a jazz group, and participated in madrigal singing.

As an undergraduate at Yale University Yeston majored in music theory and composition, writing an atonal sonata for piano, incidental music for a production of Brecht’s Life of Galileo, and a cello concerto that won Yale's Friends of Music Prize, and minored in philosophy and literature, particularly French, German, Italian and Japanese. Yeston noted, "I am as much a lyricist as a composer, and the musical theatre is the only genre I know in which the lyrics are as important as the music." After graduating from Yale Magna cum Laude, Phi Beta Kappa in 1967, Yeston attended Clare College, University of Cambridge on a two-year Mellon Fellowship where he continued his studies in musicology and composition. There, he belonged to Cambridge Footlights Dramatic Club and wrote several classical pieces, including a set of atonal songs for soprano and a chamber piece (Trilogues for Three String Quartets) in addition to a musical version of Alice in Wonderland, eventually produced at the Long Wharf Theatre in Connecticut in 1971. At Cambridge, he focused his musical goals, moving from classical composition to theatre songwriting. Upon earning his master's degree there, Yeston returned to the United States to accept a Woodrow Wilson Fellowship to teach for a year at Lincoln University in Pennsylvania, the country's oldest traditionally black college. At Lincoln, Yeston taught music, art history, philosophy and Western Civilization, and founded Lincoln's course in the history of African-American music.

He then pursued a musicology doctorate at Yale, teaching the same African-American music history course there that he had taught at Lincoln. While there, he enrolled in the BMI Lehman Engel Musical Theater Workshop, traveling to New York City each week, where he and other aspiring composer/lyricists, including Ed Kleban, Alan Menken, and Howard Ashman, were able to try out material for established Broadway producers and directors. He completed his Ph.D. at Yale in 1974, with his dissertation published as a book by Yale University Press: The Stratification of Musical Rhythm (1976), Soon afterwards, his cello concerto was premiered by Yo-Yo Ma and the Norwalk Symphony Orchestra with Gilbert Levine conducting. He then joined the Yale Music Dept. faculty where he taught for eight years, ultimately becoming Yale's Director of Undergraduate Studies in Music. He subsequently published another theory book with Yale University Press, Readings in Schenker Analysis and Other Approaches (editor, 1977), (both of his books are noted for their discussions of rhythmic structure and Schenkerian analysis) and was twice cited by the student body as one of Yale's ten best professors.

=== Musical theatre career ===
Nine and La Cage

While teaching at Yale, Yeston continued to attend the BMI workshop principally to work on his project, begun in 1973, to write a musical inspired by Federico Fellini's 1963 film 8½. As a teenager, Yeston had seen the film and became intrigued by its themes. Yeston told The New York Times in 1982:

"I looked at the screen and said 'That's me.' I still believed in all the dreams and ideals of what it was to be an artist, and here was a movie about... an artist in trouble. It became an obsession". Yeston called the musical Nine (the age of the director in his flashback), explaining that if you add music to 8½, "it's like half a number more."

In 1978, at the O'Neill Conference, Yeston and director Howard Ashman held a staged reading of Nine. Unbeknownst to him, Katharine Hepburn was in the audience, and after seeing it and liking it, she wrote to Fellini saying she had seen a wonderful show based on his movie. When Yeston went to ask permission to make the show a musical, Fellini told him he already received a letter from Hepburn and gave him permission. Mario Fratti had written the book, but the producers and director Tommy Tune decided his script did not work and brought in Arthur Kopit in 1981 to write a new book. The show originally had male and female parts, but Yeston was not satisfied with the men auditioning, except Raul Julia. They had liked a lot of the women who had auditioned, so Tune suggested casting them all. Yeston began work on choral arrangements for 24 women. Yeston decided that, instead of having the band play the overture, he would have all the women sing it. Once Liliane Montevecchi joined the cast, Yeston was so impressed with her voice that he wrote Folies Bergere just for her. He also expanded Call from the Vatican for Anita Morris once he discovered she could sing a high C.

In 1981, while collaborating on Nine, Tune asked Yeston to write incidental music for an American production of Caryl Churchill's play Cloud Nine. Tune was also engaged to work on the musical La Cage aux Folles, based on the 1978 film of the same name, and the producer, Allan Carr, was seeking a composer. Yeston was engaged to write the music and lyrics, with a book by Jay Presson Allen. Their stage version of the film was to be called The Queen of Basin Street, set in New Orleans; it was hoped to be staged in 1981. Mike Nichols was set to direct and Tommy Tune to choreograph. Yeston took time off from Yale to work on the project and had already written several jazzy songs, but Carr was unable to put together the financing for the show, and the project was postponed. Carr searched for executive producers and found them in Fritz Holt and Barry Brown, who immediately fired the entire creative team that Carr had assembled, except for Yeston, who later withdrew from the project. These creatives, other than Yeston, eventually filed lawsuits, but only Yeston collected a royalty from La Cage.

Meanwhile, Yeston and Tune turned back to Nine, which opened on Broadway on May 9, 1982, at the 46th Street Theatre and ran for 729 performances. The cast included Raul Julia as Guido. The musical won five Tony Awards, including best musical, and Yeston won for best score. A London production and a successful Broadway revival of Nine followed in 2003, starring Antonio Banderas and winning the Tony Award for Best Revival of a Musical. In 2009, a film version of Nine, directed by Rob Marshall and starring Daniel Day-Lewis, Judi Dench, Sophia Loren and Marion Cotillard, was released. Yeston wrote three new songs for the film and was nominated for the 2009 Academy Award for Best Original Song for "Take It All" and the 2009 Golden Globe Award for Best Original Song, "Cinema Italiano".

Phantom and next projects

After the success of Nine, Yeston left his position as associate professor at Yale, although he continued to teach a course there every other semester alternating between songwriting and Schubert Lieder. He then turned to writing a musical version of Gaston Leroux's novel, The Phantom of the Opera. He was approached with the idea by actor/director Geoffrey Holder, who held the American rights to the novel. Initially, Yeston was skeptical of the project. "I laughed and laughed.... That's the worst idea in the world! Why would you want to write a musical based on a horror story?.... And then it occurred to me that the story could be somewhat changed.... [The Phantom] would be a Quasimodo character, an Elephant Man. Don't all of us feel, despite outward imperfections, that deep inside we're good? And that is a character you cry for."

Yeston had completed much of Phantom and was in the process of raising money for a Broadway production when Andrew Lloyd Webber announced plans for his own musical version of the story. After Lloyd Webber's show became a smash hit in London in 1986, Yeston's version could not get funding for a Broadway production. However, in 1991, it premiered at Houston's Theatre Under the Stars and has since received over 1,000 productions around the world. The Houston production was recorded as an original cast album by RCA records. Yeston's Phantom is more operetta-like in style than Lloyd Webber's, seeking to reflect the 1890s period, and seeks to project a French atmosphere to reflect its Parisian setting.

Meanwhile, Yeston's In the Beginning, a musical poking good-natured fun at the first five books of the Bible from the perspective of ordinary people living through the events described, had been workshopped at the Manhattan Theatre Club with an initial Book by Larry Gelbart under the title 1-2-3-4-5 in 1987 and 1988. After various revisions and tryouts, it was finally produced under its current title at Maine State Music Theatre in 1998 and has been revived regionally since then. Yeston showed Alan Jay Lerner a song from In the Beginning, "New Words", and "Lerner thought the song was so wonderful he invited me to stop by his office every couple of weeks so he could give me pointers. He said Oscar Hammerstein had done that for him and he wanted to do that for me. So, I really got coaching lessons – mentoring – in a series of meetings with Alan Jay Lerner as a result of having written that song." Plácido Domingo wanted to star in a musical about Spanish painter Francisco de Goya and suggested to producer Allan Carr that Yeston would be the right person to create the vehicle, since Domingo admired Nine. Yeston wrote the piece, Goya: A Life in Song. Because of Domingo's time commitments, the musical was made into a concept album and was recorded in 1988. The album was produced by Phil Ramone and included the song "Till I Loved You" (a 1988 cover by Barbra Streisand and Don Johnson reached number 25 on the Billboard Hot 100.). Domingo also recorded a single of the song with Gloria Estefan titled "Hasta amarte" (used in the Spanish-language version of the album, Goya Una Vida Hecha Cancion), which peaked at number 8 on Billboard's Hot Latin Songs chart. Domingo sang the role of Goya, with Jennifer Rush, Gloria Estefan, Dionne Warwick, Richie Havens, and Seiko Matsuda in other roles.

Grand Hotel and December Songs

Also in 1989, Tommy Tune, who had directed Nine, asked Yeston to improve the score of Grand Hotel, a musical that was doing badly in tryouts. The show was based on the 1932 film of the same name and on an unsuccessful 1958 musical At the Grand, with a score by Robert Wright and George Forrest. Yeston wrote eight new songs for Grand Hotel and revised much of the existing 1958 lyrics. After Grand Hotel opened on Broadway in November 1989, Yeston, along with Wright and Forrest, was nominated for the Tony Award and two Drama Desk Awards for best score. The show ran for 1,077 performances.

After this, Yeston wrote December Songs (1991), a song cycle inspired by Franz Schubert's Winterreise. December Songs was written as a commissioned piece for the 1991 centennial celebration of New York's Carnegie Hall, where it was premiered by cabaret singer Andrea Marcovicci. The work crosses over the lines from classical music to Broadway to cabaret and has been recorded in German (Dezemberlieder) by Pia Douwes, French (Décembre) by Isabelle Georges, Polish (Opowieści Zimowe, Edyta Krzemien), and six times in English, including as December Songs for Voice and Orchestra (2022), featuring orchestration by Larry Hochman with Victoria Clark as soloist.

Titanic

The discovery of the wreckage of the R.M.S. Titanic in 1985 attracted Yeston's interest in writing a musical about the famous disaster. "What drew me to the project was the positive aspects of what the ship represented – 1) humankind's striving after great artistic works and similar technological feats, despite the possibility of tragic failure, and 2) the dreams of the passengers on board: 3rd Class, to immigrate to America for a better life; 2nd Class, to live a leisured lifestyle in imitation of the upper classes; 1st Class, to maintain their privileged positions forever. The collision with the iceberg dashed all of these dreams simultaneously, and the subsequent transformation of character of the passengers and crew had, it seemed to me, the potential for great emotional and musical expression onstage." Librettist Peter Stone and Yeston knew that the idea was an unusual subject for a musical. "I think if you don't have that kind of daring damn-the-torpedoes, you shouldn't be in this business. It's the safe-sounding shows that often don't do well. You have to dare greatly, and I really want to stretch the bounds of the kind of expression in musical theater," Yeston explained. Yeston saw the story as unique to turn-of-the-century British culture, with its rigid social class system and its romanticization of progress through technology. "In order to depict that on the stage, because this is really a very English show, I knew I would have to have a color similar to the one found in the music of the great composers at that time, like Elgar or Vaughan Williams; this was for me an opportunity to bring in the musical theater an element of the symphonic tradition that I think we really haven't had before. That was very exciting."

The high cost of the Titanic musical set made it impossible for the show to have traditional out-of-town tryouts. Titanic opened at Broadway's Lunt-Fontanne Theatre in 1997 to mixed reviews. The New Yorker offered a positive assessment: : "It seemed a foregone conclusion that the show would be a failure; a musical about history's most tragic maiden voyage, in which fifteen hundred people lost their lives, was obviously preposterous.... Astonishingly, Titanic manages to be grave and entertaining, somber and joyful; little by little you realize that you are in the presence of a genuine addition to American musical theatre." The show won Tony Awards in the five categories in which it was nominated, including Best Score and Best Musical and ran for 804 performances and 26 previews, toured America for three years, and has had international productions, including in the UK, Japan, Korea, China, Australia, Germany, Holland, Belgium, Hungary, and has toured across America.

An American Cantata: 2000 Voices, Death Takes a Holiday, Tom Sawye:r A Ballet in Three Acts, and later works

In 1999 Yeston was commissioned by the Kennedy Center to write and orchestrate a three-movement orchestral work for the millennium celebration, An American Cantata: 2000 Voices, which was performed by the National Symphony Orchestra under the baton of Leonard Slatkin at the Lincoln Memorial in July 2000, with a chorus of 2000 voices and tenor soloist Norm Lewis. Yeston used "2000 Voices as a celebration of the year the piece was created ... chosen from 108 local ensembles." The piece was praised by the Washington Post, comparing its score to Copland and Randall Thompson and singling out in particular the second movement, which has a text from Martin Luther King Jr.'s Memphis speech he gave the day before his death, I have been to the mountaintop and I have seen the promised land." Orchestrated by Yeston, the piece celebrates the evolution of the idea of individual liberty and equality, along with our inherent and universal entitlement to it, as our civilization's greatest intellectual achievement of the past 1,000 years. Sung by a mixed chorus, children's choir, and gospel choir, texts include excerpts from the Magna Carta, and the writings of Thomas Jefferson, in addition to the Memphis Speech, and lyrics by the composer.

After composing the incidental music for Broadway's 2009 revival of The Royal Family, Yeston wrote the music and lyrics to Death Takes a Holiday, a musical version of the play La Morte in Vacanza by Alberto Casella (later the film Death Takes a Holiday), with a book by Peter Stone and Thomas Meehan. It played in the summer of 2011 Off-Broadway at the Laura Pels Theatre. The musical was nominated in eleven categories for the 2011–12 Drama Desk Awards, including Best Musical, Music and Lyrics. It was also nominated for an Outer Critics Circle Award for Outstanding Musical and Score, and cited as one of Time Magazine's top ten plays and musicals of the 2011 season. An off West End production played in 2017 at London's Charing Cross Theatre.

In 2011, Yeston's ballet Tom Sawyer: A Ballet in Three Acts premiered at the Kauffman Center for the Performing Arts in Kansas City, Missouri, with the Kansas City Ballet. Alastair Macaulay's review in The New York Times observed:

"It's quite likely that this is the first all-new, entirely American three-act ballet: it is based on an American literary classic, has an original score by an American composer and was given its premiere by an American choreographer and company. ... Both the score and the choreography are energetic, robust, warm, deliberately naïve (both ornery and innocent), in ways right for Twain."

In 2019 Anything Can Happen In the Theater – The Musical World of Maury Yeston, a revue, with Yeston's songs, was created and directed by Gerard Alessandrini, at the York Theatre in Manhattan. In October 2020 on the PS Classics Label, Yeston released Maury Sings Yeston: The Demos, a compendium of his own vocal recordings of forty of his classic Demos. In 2025 Yeston completed the score to Issa in Paris, a musical about 18th-century Japanese haiku poet Kobayashi Issa and a modern playwright's journey to uncover the truth about Issa's mysterious disappearance from 1767 to 1777; the book and lyrics are by Takahashi Chikae. It premiered in January 2026 at Nissay Theatre, Chiyoda City, Tokyo, Japan.

== Critical reception ==
According to Show Music magazine, Yeston "has written some of the most formally structured music in recent musical theatre. But he also has the gift for creating ravishing melody – once you've heard 'Love Can't Happen' from Grand Hotel, or 'Unusual Way' from Nine, or 'Home' from Phantom, or any number of other Yeston songs, you'll be hooked." Broadway World praised "The genius of Yeston's songs – intricate yet emotional, cerebral yet romantic, clever yet unendingly melodic [and] his immense breadth of style – from the hilarious to the deeply moving."

=== Family ===
Yeston is married to Julianne Waldhelm.

== Work ==
Broadway

- Nine (1982; revived 2003)
- Grand Hotel (1989)
- Titanic (1997)
- The Royal Family (2009)

Off-Broadway

- Cloud Nine, (1981, incidental music for the Caryl Churchill work. Theatre de Lys in NYC and production in Chicago)
- In the Beginning (1987; workshopped as 1-2-3-4-5 at Manhattan Theatre Club) Book by Larry Gelbart
- Death Takes a Holiday (2011)
- Anything Can Happen In The Theatre (2020) Revue at York Theatre

Film

- Nine (2009),

Ballet

- Tom Sawyer: A Ballet in Three Acts, commissioned by Kansas City Ballet (2011)

Other works

- Goya: A Life In Song (1989; one of Barbra Streisand's pop hits, "Till I Loved You" is from the show)
- Phantom, with a Book by Arthur Kopit (1991) Productions worldwide.
- December Songs, a song cycle commissioned by Carnegie Hall for their Centennial celebration (1991).
- An American Cantata (2000), for orchestra and 2000 voices, commissioned by The Kennedy Center, a choral symphony in three movements, which premiered on the steps of the Lincoln Memorial by the National Symphony Orchestra, conducted by Leonard Slatkin
- The Peony Pavilion, a musical adaption of The Peony Pavilion, 2012, commissioned by the People's Republic of China, only workshopped
- Issa In Paris - A New Musical (2026) Tokyo, Japan

Concert

- Concerto for Cello and Orchestra, premiered by Yo-Yo Ma, Gilbert Levine conductor.
- December Songs – for voice and orchestra (2022)
- Sonata for Piano
- Aube, (Arthur Rimbaud) for soprano and chamber orchestra
- Five Ecstatic Songs – for soprano and piano
- Trilogues for Three String Quartets
- Song for Violin and Piano
- My Grandmother's Love Letters (Hart Crane), for voice and piano

Publications

- The Stratification of Musical Rhythm (1975 Yale University Press)
- Readings in Schenker Analysis and Other Approaches (1977 Yale University Press)
- Rubato and the Middleground, Journal of Music Theory. Vol. 19. No. 2. (Autumn, 1975). pp. 286-301

== Awards and recognition ==
- Tony Award for Best Original Score (1982) (Nine)
- Drama Desk Award for Outstanding Music (1982) (Nine)
- Drama Desk Award for Outstanding Lyrics (1982) (Nine)
- Nominee for Tony Award for Best Original Score in 1990 (Grand Hotel)
- Nominee for the Drama Desk Award for Outstanding Music in 1990 (Grand Hotel)
- Nominee for the Drama Desk Award for Outstanding Lyrics in 1990 (Grand Hotel)
- Tony Award for Best Original Score (1997) (Titanic)
- Nominee for Grammy Award for Best Musical Show Album, 1983 (Nine)
- Nominee for Grammy Award for Best Musical Show Album, 1998 (Titanic)
- Nominee for Grammy Award for Best Musical Show Album, 2004 (Nine)
- Laurence Olivier Award 2005 (Grand Hotel)
- Nominee for Academy Award for Best Original Song – "Take It All" in 2010 (Nine)
- Nominee for Golden Globe Award for Best Original Song – "Cinema Italiano" in 2010 (Nine)
- Nominee for Broadcast Film Critics Association Award for Best Original Song ("Cinema Italiano")
- Nominee for Satellite Award for Best Original Song ("Cinema Italiano")
- Nominee for the Drama Desk Award for Outstanding Music in 2012 (Death Takes a Holiday)
- Nominee for the Drama Desk Award for Outstanding Lyrics in 2012 (Death Takes a Holiday)
- ACE Award – Association of Latin Entertainment Critics Argentine award – Mejor Musical for "Nueve"
- Yale Friends of Music Prize (cello concerto)
- Honorary Doctorate in Music, DMA Five Towns College 2004
- Elaine Kaufman Cultural Center Creative Arts Award, 1998
- Kayden Visiting Artist, Harvard University
- Emerson College Leonidas A. Nicklole Artist of Distinction Award, 2017
- Sheldon Harnick Award for Creative Excellence, 2020
- American Theater Hall of Fame, 2023

Yeston served on the board of the Songwriters Hall of Fame, the Dramatists’ Guild Council, the Kurt Weill Foundation Publication Project and the editorial board of Musical Quarterly; he is a past president of the Kleban Foundation, an advisor to the Yale University Press Broadway Series. He is an honorary ambassador of the Society of Composers & Lyricists, and a founding member of the Society for Music Theory.

== Discography ==
- Nine: original Broadway cast (1982; Grammy Award nomination), Nine 2003 Broadway revival cast (2004; Grammy Award nomination) London Festival Hall Concert and others in French, German, Dutch, Japanese, Swedish and Polish
- The Film version of Nine, (Soundtrack recording): Daniel Day-Lewis, Marion Cotillard, Penélope Cruz, Judi Dench, Fergie, Kate Hudson, Nicole Kidman, Sophia Loren
- Goya: A Life in Song, Placido Domingo, Gloria Estefan. Dionne Warwick, Richie Havens, (original studio cast, 1989)
- December Songs (English) Andrea Marcovicci, Harolyn Blackwell, Laura Osnes, Victoria Clark (with orchestra), (German) Pia Douwes, (Polish) Edyta Krzemień, (French) Isabelle Georges
- Grand Hotel (original Broadway cast, 1992)
- Phantom (original cast recording, 1993)
- Titanic (original Broadway cast (1997; Grammy Award nomination), original Dutch cast, original German Hamburg cast)
- The Maury Yeston Songbook (2003; a compilation of 20 songs recorded by Betty Buckley, Christine Ebersole, Laura Benanti, Sutton Foster, Alice Ripley, Johnny Rodgers and others)
- Death Takes a Holiday (original off-Broadway cast recording, 2011)
- Tom Sawyer: A Ballet in Three Acts (San Francisco Ballet Orchestra 2011), recorded at Skywalker Sound, 2013
- Laura Osnes – If I Tell You: The Songs of Maury Yeston (2013, Laura Osnes)
- Anything Can Happen In The Theatre-The Musical World of Maury Yeston (original off-Broadway cast recording, 2020)
- Maury Sings Yeston - The Demos (a compendium of 40 of Yeston's classic Demos, sung and accompanied on piano by Yeston, recorded over a period of 40 years) 2020
- Christmas in the Stars: Star Wars Christmas Album (1980)
- December Songs for Voice and Orchestra, featuring Victoria Clark as soloist (2022)
