= December Songs =

Song cycle by Maury Yeston

- by Maury Yeston
- Year: 1991
- Related: Winterreise by Franz Schubert

Premiere
- Date: May 5, 1991
- Location: Weill Recital Hall
- Performers: Andrea Marcovicci and pianist (uncredited)

December Songs (Note: Titled December Songs for voice and orchestra on the 2022 recording featuring Victoria Clark) is a song cycle for singer and pianist by musical theatre composer-lyricist Maury Yeston. The work is a "retelling" of Franz Schubert's Winterreise, (a song cycle of art songs), with a cabaret sensibility. The songs in both December Songs and Winterreise are linked as a sequence of reflections by the singer taking a lonely walk in winter, thinking back on his or her lost love.

The piece crosses over the line from classical music to Broadway to cabaret. Where the Schubert masterpiece features words by Wilhelm Müller portraying a jilted young man's wandering the snows of the Vienna woods and ultimately sinking into madness, the Yeston lyrics depict a contemporary young woman wandering a snowy Central Park in New York City and finding recovery and hope on her journey.

It has been recorded six times in English, and once each in French, German, and Polish.

== Performances and recordings ==
=== Premiere ===
The work was written as a result of Yeston being commissioned to write a piece for the 1991 centennial celebration of New York's Carnegie Hall, where it was performed by cabaret singer Andrea Marcovicci and an uncredited pianist. It was performed at the Weill Recital Hall, which was packed with Broadway and nightclub luminaries, who gave it a thunderous ovation. The New York Times indicated the uniqueness of the score as Yeston's confident marriage of the classic and the contemporaneity that would likely lead to its enduring nature." A recording of Marcovicci's performance was released the following year on January 1. The Chicago Tribune commented: "Though it`s true that Yeston is hardly the first composer to create an epic song cycle, no one has put one together quite the way he has. Neither the German romantics nor the French Impressionists nor the American modernists conceived a cycle in a pop idiom and with the emotional depth of the best musical theater. Yet that`s precisely what Yeston has created in ”December Songs,” which is graced by melodies that are Mozartean in their simplicity, harmonies that plainly underscore the drama and lyrics at once poetic and colloquial. Imagine a Rodgers and Hart musical for a cast of one-and with no dialogue, dancing or similar distractions-and you begin to see how ”December Songs” grips an audience. Like Franz Schubert`s far darker song cycle ”Die Winterreise” (”The Winter Journey”), to which Yeston`s piece loosely refers, ”December Songs” comprises soliloquies from a character who yearns for a lost love”

=== Subsequent performances ===
December Songs has been performed worldwide including France, the UK, Germany, the Netherlands, and Poland,

It had a limited run for three months in 2004 at the Theatre du Renard in Paris, where it was sung in French by Isabelle Georges. It has been recorded seven times in English by Marcovicci, Georges, Harolyn Blackwell, and others, in German by Pia Douwes, with a German translation by Wolfgang Adenberg, in Polish by Edyta Krzemien, also in English (in the Netherlands) by Hetty Sponselee and Sheila Conolly, and in French by Georges.

Two time Tony nominee Laura Osnes recently featured December Songs in her 54 Below debut, Laura Osnes Sings Maury Yeston, and on her album If I Tell You. December Songs was recorded with a male singer for the first time in 2017 by New York cabaret singer Stearns Matthews. On November 11, 2022, a new recording with a 37 piece orchestra, December Songs for Voice and Orchestra, starring Victoria Clark with orchestrations by Larry Hochman was released.

== Song list ==
1. "December Snow"
2. "Where Are You Now"
3. "Please Let's Not Even Say Hello"
4. "When Your Love Is New"
5. "Bookseller In The Rain"
6. "My Grandmother's Love Letters"
7. "I Am Longing"
8. "I Had A Dream About You"
9. "By The River"
10. "What A Relief"
