= PS Classics =

Record label

- Founded: 2000
- Founder: Tommy Krasker; Philip Chaffin
- Status: Active
- Genre: Musical theatre
- Country of origin: United States
- Location: Bronxville, NY
- Official website: www.psclassics.com

PS Classics is a record label that specializes in musical theatre and standard vocals, founded in 2000 by Grammy-nominated freelance producer Tommy Krasker and singer/actor Philip Chaffin.

Recent Broadway cast recordings from PS Classics include Xanadu, The Frogs, the revivals of 110 in the Shade, Pacific Overtures, Fiddler on the Roof, and Nine, as well as the premiere recordings of Grey Gardens, A Year with Frog and Toad, My Life With Albertine, Zanna, Don't!, Through the Years, Striking 12, Only Heaven and First Lady Suite.

In May 2006, PS Classics released their first London cast album, the London revival of Stephen Sondheim's Sunday in the Park with George. In an unprecedented move, it recorded Grey Gardens twice, replacing the off-Broadway recording with a complete Broadway recording. Having a long-standing association with Stephen Sondheim, the label has released seven albums of work by the composer. They also have long-standing relationships with composers Maury Yeston and Ricky Ian Gordon.

In addition to their Broadway cast albums, PS Classics has also released a slew of solo albums by Broadway and cabaret stars such as Christine Andreas, Tony Award nominee Rebecca Luker, Tony Award nominee Kerry Butler, Tony Award winner Victoria Clark, Tony Award nominee Jason Danieley, Jackie Hoffman, Lauren Kennedy, Grammy nominee Maureen McGovern, Jessica Molaskey, Jane Olivor, label co-owner Philip Chaffin, the band Groovelily, and several others. They also issued the CD debut of Charlotte Rae's 1955 solo album, Songs I Taught My Mother as well as the songbook albums of composers Maury Yeston and Georgia Stitt.

PS Classics has also partnered with the Library of Congress on their acclaimed "Songwriter Series", in which musical theatre composers/lyricist sing their own work. Four composers have been released through PS Classics: Hugh Martin, Charles Strouse, Jonathan Larson and Howard Ashman. In 2008, PS Classics released its first soundtrack, for the critically acclaimed musical film, Were the World Mine. They also made their first foray into opera, releasing Ricky Ian Gordon's The Grapes of Wrath, in a live recording of the Minnesota Opera production.

PS Classics also maintains a not-for-profit companion label, PS Classics, Inc., which is dedicated to the location and restoration of lost scores and musical theatre material. Their first project was the restoration and all-star recording of Fine and Dandy, a 1930s musical by Kay Swift, one of the first female composers on Broadway. Their recent releases include two volumes of the Sondheim Sings series, a collection of demo recordings by composer Stephen Sondheim which highlight some of his early, lesser-known work.

The PS of PS Classics is named for Krasker and Chaffin's two dogs, Please (an Australian cattle dog) and Sumner (a bull terrier). PS Classics is based in Bronxville, New York.

== Notes and references ==
- Beghtol, L.D., "Show-tune kings", The Advocate, December 9, 2003. Accessed 21 October 2008.
- Holden, Stephen "Grand Broadway Voices, Yours for a Song", New York Times, June 16, 2006. Accessed 21 October 2008.
- Jones, Kenneth "PS Classics Has New Nonprofit Arm to Record Vintage Shows", Playbill January 26, 2004. Accessed 21 October 2008.
- Kuchwara, Michael, "A Charlotte Rae Recording Is Born Again", Associated Press, December 18, 2006. Accessed 21 October 2008.
- Simonson, Robert "The Melody Lingers On: Small Labels Keep Theatre Music Alive, Playbill, March 29, 2007. Accessed 21 October 2008.
