= IThemba =

2010 film by Elinor Burkett

iThemba
- Directed by: Elinor Burkett
- Produced by: Elinor Burkett and Errol Webber
- Cinematography: Errol Webber
- Edited by: Errol Webber
- Music by: Liyana
- Release date: 18 November 2010 (Amsterdam)
- Running time: 72 minutes
- Country: Zimbabwe
- Language: English

iThemba is a feature-length documentary film shot in Zimbabwe, directed and produced by Elinor Burkett and produced by Errol Webber, who also shot and edited the film. It premiered at the International Documentary Film Festival Amsterdam in November 2010.

The film follows the members of the Zimbabwean band Liyana, a group of eight physically disabled musicians who navigate a country where several superstitious citizens believe them to be cursed. The film explores the band's performances and dynamics as they travel to vastly difference environments, such as across Bulawayo city, remote villages, rural bottle shops, urban marketplaces, traditional healers' huts and the neighborhoods of the urban poor.

The music band features Prudence Mabhena and Marvelous Mbulo as the lead singers, a palsied legless woman and a charismatic philanderer born with Muscular Dystrophy respectively. Energy Maburutse is the band's marimba player who uses humor to cope with the constant pain he is under from brittle bone disease. The film includes the band's satirical jokes and performances of Afro-fusion melodies, most composed by members of Liyana.

Shot during and in the wake of the Zimbabwean presidential election, 2008 and the country's economic meltdown by an American, Zimbabwean and Jamaican team, the film unfolds against the backdrop of enormous political tension and the daily struggle to find a bank that actually had cash, to buy food although the store shelves were empty, and to navigate streets pocked with wheelchair-mangling potholes.

== Title ==
The title of the film means Hope in isiNdebele, one of the two major languages of Zimbabwe. It is drawn from the film's title song.

== Cast ==
In alphabetical order

Farai Mabhande
Prudence Mabhena
Marvelous Mbulo
Energy Maburutse
Honest Mupatsi
Tapiwa Nyengera
Goodwell Nzou
Vusani Vuma

== See also ==
- Music by Prudence, a documentary film about Prudence Mabhena
