= Nine (soundtrack) =

Nine (Original Motion Picture Soundtrack)

Soundtrack album by Various Artists
- Released: December 22, 2009
- Recorded: September 2008
- Genre: Film soundtrack
- Length: 57:37
- Label: Geffen Records
- Producer: Tal Herzberg; Rob Marshall; Matthew Sullivan

Nine (Original Motion Picture Soundtrack) is the soundtrack album to the 2009 film Nine released on December 22, 2009, through Geffen Records. The film, directed by Rob Marshall, was loosely based on the musical of the same name, which in turn is based on the film 8½, and featured an ensemble cast that includes Daniel Day-Lewis, Marion Cotillard, Penélope Cruz, Judi Dench, Fergie, Kate Hudson, Nicole Kidman, and Sophia Loren.

The album featured tracks from the Broadway musical performed by the cast members, and three original songs written and composed by Maury Yeston. Two of the songs—"Cinema Italiano" and "Take It All"—were respectively nominated for the Golden Globe Award for Best Original Song and Academy Award for Best Original Song.

== Background ==
"It was incredibly important to understand that film is a director's art, that (Marshall) be able to adapt this stage musical and make a film independent of an overcontrolling Broadway author looking over his shoulder [...] That's the very first thing I said to Rob."

— Maury Yeston, composer of the original Broadway musical Nine

The film's soundtrack accompanied songs based on the original Broadway musical. Around 16 tracks were featured in the album, with a bonus track released specifically for digital platforms.

According to music supervisor Sullivan, Marshall's idea of a musical is that people does not sing to each other in real life, and he did not want such. Hence, they designed a stage, which all happens through the inside of Guido's mind and his fantasies and how he sees the world through theatrics and music. Music director Paul Bogaev assigned all of the actors to prepare them and record the songs before filming. As Day-Lewis have not done anything musically except singing in choirs, Bogaev worked with the actor for several days before recording the score.

The recording commenced during September 2008, and Bogaev conducted a 50-piece orchestra at the Abbey Road Studios on London. Italian composer Andrea Guerra was assigned to write the incidental underscore.

== Original songs ==
The original composer Maury Yeston had recorded three original songs for the film, which were:

1. "Guarda La Luna" (Look at the Moon) — a lullaby sung by Sophia Loren as Mamma. Yeston tailored this song specifically for Loren's voice, though he based the melody on the song Waltz from Nine from the Broadway score.
2. "Cinema Italiano" — a number which Kate Hudson performs as Stephanie. This has "a retro feel" with "elements of '60s pop" that demonstrate how important Italian cinema was in that era and to illustrate the shallowness and vanity of Stephanie.
3. "Take It All" — originally written as a trio for Claudia, Carla, and Luisa, but, just before shooting, rearranged as a solo for Luisa, according to music supervisor Matt Sullivan.

== Removed songs ==
These are songs that appeared in the musical, but were not included in the film nor in the soundtrack.

1. "Not Since Chaplin", by Company
2. "The Germans at the Spa", by Company
3. "Not Since Chaplin – Reprise", by Company
4. "Movie Themes", by Guido
5. "Only with You", by Guido
6. "The Script", by Guido
7. "Nine", by Mamma
8. "Ti Voglio Bene", by Saraghina
9. "The Bells of St. Sebastian", by Guido, Little Guido and Company
10. "A Man Like You", by Guido and Claudia
11. "Unusual Way – Duet", by Guido and Claudia
12. "Contini Submits", by Guido
13. "The Grand Canal" (Every Girl in Venice/Amor/Only You/Finale), by Guido, Claudia, Lilli, Luisa, Stephanie, Carla, Mamma, Company
14. "Simple", by Carla
15. "Be on Your Own", by Luisa
16. "Not Since Chaplin – Reprise", by Company
17. "Getting Tall", by Little Guido
18. "Long Ago – Reprise/Nine – Reprise", by Guido, Little Guido and Luisa

== Release ==
Geffen Records released the soundtrack on December 22, 2009, through physical formats. The soundtrack was exclusively released through iTunes and Amazon, a week prior, with two bonus tracks for specific platforms.

== Track listing ==
No.	Title	Performer(s)	Length
1.	"Overture Delle Donne"	Female Ensemble	4:07
2.	"Guido's Song"	Daniel Day-Lewis	3:41
3.	"A Call from the Vatican"	Penélope Cruz	3:40
4.	"Folies Bergère"	Judi Dench	4:42
5.	"Be Italian"	Fergie	4:12
6.	"My Husband Makes Movies"	Marion Cotillard	4:48
7.	"Cinema Italiano"	Kate Hudson	3:13
8.	"Guarda La Luna"	Sophia Loren	3:10
9.	"Unusual Way"	Nicole Kidman	3:26
10.	"Take It All"	Marion Cotillard	3:03
11.	"I Can't Make This Movie"	Daniel Day-Lewis	2:11
12.	"Finale"	Orchestra	3:35
13.	"Quando, Quando, Quando" (*)	Fergie feat. will.i.am	3:15
14.	"Io Bacio... Tu Baci" (*)	The Noisettes	3:24
15.	"Cinema Italiano" (the Ron Fair remix) (*)	Kate Hudson	3:25
16.	"Unusual Way" (*)	Griffith Frank	3:42
Total length:			57:37

(*) Songs not featured in the film, bonus tracks.

iTunes Store Only
No.	Title	Recording artist(s)	Length
17.	"Be Italian" (club version)	Fergie	2:48

Amazon mp3 Store Only
No.	Title	Recording artist(s)	Length
17.	"Cinema Italiano" (the Ron Fair remix club version)	Kate Hudson	3:26

== Reception ==
Adrian Edwards of BBC wrote "In the song stakes Nine doesn't measure up to Chicago, but the high professional gloss from all concerned in this audio presentation makes one forget that for a while. And if the object of a soundtrack is to tempt the listener into the cinema then the invitation on offer here is irresistible." William Ruhlmann of AllMusic wrote "All of this ephemera serves to make the soundtrack album for Nine as much of a train wreck as the movie itself." Philip French of The Guardian wrote "All the songs were unfamiliar to me and moderately tuneful, though I didn't leave the cinema humming them, and the lyrics are not exactly in the Stephen Sondheim class."

== Chart performance ==
Chart (2010)	Peak position
French Albums (SNEP)	139
Greek Albums (IFPI)	9
Mexican Albums (Top 100 Mexico)	62
Polish Albums (ZPAV)	3
Spanish Albums (Promusicae)	62
UK Compilation Albums (OCC)	74
UK Soundtrack Albums (OCC)	11
US Billboard 200	26
US Top Soundtracks (Billboard)	5

== Accolades ==
Award	Category	Recipients	Result	Ref.
Academy Awards	Best Original Song	"Take It All" – Maury Yeston	Nominated	
Critics' Choice Movie Awards	Best Song	"Cinema Italiano" – Maury Yeston	Nominated	
Golden Globe Awards	Best Original Song	"Cinema Italiano" – Maury Yeston	Nominated	
Houston Film Critics Society Awards	Best Original Song	"Cinema Italiano" – Maury Yeston	Nominated	
Satellite Awards	Best Original Song	"Cinema Italiano" – Maury Yeston	Nominated	
St. Louis Gateway Film Critics Association Awards	Best Music	Nine	Won	
