= Elinor Burkett =

American journalist, author, film producer, and documentary director

- Born: October 9, 1946 (age 80); Philadelphia, United States
- Education: University of Pittsburgh (PhD, Latin American History, 1975); Columbia University Graduate School of Journalism (Master's degree, 1988)
- Occupations: Journalist, author, biographer

Elinor Burkett (born October 9, 1946) is an American journalist, author, film producer, and documentary director.

A film produced by her, Music by Prudence, won the 2009 Academy Award for Best Documentary (Short Subject) on March 7, 2010.

== Education ==
In 1975, Burkett graduated from the University of Pittsburgh with a doctorate in Latin American History. In 1988, Burkett earned a master's degree from the Columbia University Graduate School of Journalism.

== Career ==
Burkett was a history professor at Frostburg State University in Frostburg, Maryland for 13 years. She gave up her tenure to get a Masters at Columbia University Graduate School of Journalism. She was a staff writer for the Miami Herald from 1988 to 1992 and she has been published by leading publications such as The New York Times Magazine, Rolling Stone and Harper's Bazaar. She has held Fulbright professorships in both Kyrgyzstan and Zimbabwe and received numerous awards and grants for her work as a historian and writer. She also chaired the Department of Journalism of the University of Alaska-Fairbanks.

She authored her first book in 1993, written with Frank Bruni. In A Gospel of Shame : Children, Sexual abuse and the Catholic Church the pair explored the incidences of Catholic sex abuse cases. Two years later she wrote The Gravest Show on Earth : America in the Age of AIDS. Burkett offered a scorching criticism of the 'AIDS industry' for greed, self-promotion and putting politics over prevention.

In 1997, she again collaborated with Bruni on Consumer Terrorism : How to Get Satisfaction When You're Being Ripped Off. A year later she collaborated with Susan Molinari on Representative Mom: Balancing Budgets, Bill, and Baby in the U.S. Congress. In the same year she challenged her own liberal feminist beliefs by interviewing conservative women for The Right Women : a Journey through the Heart of Conservative America.

In 2000's The Baby Boon : How Family-Friendly America Cheats the Childless, she attacked the US government and industry for pro-family initiatives that leaves the nation's childless paying the price. A year later she released her study of an American high school, Another Planet : a Year in the Life of a Suburban High School.

In 2004 she wrote So Many Enemies, So Little Time. An American Woman in All the Wrong Places... She related to her time in Kyrgyzstan where she moved in 2001 as a Fulbright Professor teaching journalism at the Kyrgyz-Russo Slavonic University. That same year, in the wake of 9–11, she travelled across all the -stans, as well as Iran, Iraq, Russia, China, Mongolia, and IndoChina.

In 2004 Burkett also co-directed Is It True What They Say About Ann, a documentary about the right-wing commentator Ann Coulter.

Four years later, she wrote her first biography, about the late Israeli Prime Minister, Golda Meir. In the book Burkett vindicated Meir for her role in the Yom Kippur War, stressing that far greater responsibility lay with the Israeli Defense Minister, Moshe Dayan.

A film that she was involved in the production of, Music by Prudence, won the 2009 Academy Award for Best Documentary (Short Subject). She was removed from production of the documentary a year earlier, resulting in a lawsuit and out of court settlement. It caused a media frenzy when, in the midst of the televised Oscar ceremony, the 82nd Academy Awards, she interrupted the acceptance speech of producer and director Roger Ross Williams. It was widely touted as the "Kanye Moment" of that year's Oscars, referring to the Kanye West incident at the 2009 MTV Video Music Awards.

== Personal life ==
Burkett divides her time between New York and her home in Bulawayo, Zimbabwe, where she trains journalists, writes and makes films.

== Bibliography ==
=== Books ===
- Burkett, Elinor & Frank Bruni (1993). A Gospel of Shame: Children, Sexual Abuse and the Catholic Church. New York: Viking.
- The Gravest Show On Earth: America in the Age of AIDS, (Houghton Mifflin Co, Boston), 1995, ISBN 0-395-74537-3
- Consumer Terrorism: How to Get Satisfaction When You're Being Ripped Off, (HarperPerennial, New York), 1997, ISBN 0-06-095196-6 (Co-authored with Frank Bruni)
- Representative Mom: Balancing Budgets, Bill, and Baby in the U.S. Congress, (Doubleday, New York), 1998, ISBN 0-385-49220-0 (Co-authored with Susan Molinari)
- The Right Women: A Journey Through the Heart of Conservative America, (Charles Scribner's Sons, New York), 1998, ISBN 0-684-83308-5
- The Baby Boon: How Family-friendly America Cheats the Childless, Free Press, New York, 2000, ISBN 0-684-86303-0
- Another Planet: A Year in the Life of a Suburban High School, (HarperCollins, New York), 2001, ISBN 0-06-621148-4
- So Many Enemies, So Little Time: An American Woman in All the Wrong Places..., (HarperCollins, New York), 2004, ISBN 0-06-052442-1
- Golda, (HarperCollins, New York), 2008, ISBN 0-06-078665-5
  - UK ed. Golda Meir: The Iron Lady of the Middle East, (Gibson Square, London), 2008, ISBN 978-1-906-14213-1

=== Essays and reporting ===
- Burkett, Elinor (September 1996). "In the Land of Conservative Women". Politics. The Atlantic Monthly. 278 (3): 19–20, 22, 24–26, 29.

== Filmography ==
=== Producer ===
- Music by Prudence (2010)
- iThemba (2010)

=== Director ===
- iThemba (2010)
- Is It True What They Say About Ann (2004)
