= Prudence Mabhena =

Zimbabwean singer

- Born: 23 February 1986 (age 40); Zimbabwe
- Genres: Afro-Fusion
- Occupation: Singer

Prudence Mabhena is a Zimbabwean singer. Prudence Mabhena was born with Arthrogryposis, and was severely disabled. The society she was born into considers disabilities to carry the taint of witchcraft. Because of this, she was abandoned by her family. As a result, she was raised by her maternal grandmother who sang to her while working on her farm. She later attended King George VI School for the disabled in Bulawayo.

== Musical career ==
While at school she discovered a love for music and performing, and founded the band Liyana with seven other disabled students and was made up of:

- Prudence Mabhena – singer and composer (has arthrogryposis)
- Tapiwa Nyengera – back-up singer, keyboard, front man (has spina bifida)
- Energy Maburutse – first marimba player, back-up vocalist (has osteogenesis imperfecta, brittle bone syndrome)
- Honest Mupatse – tenor marimba player (has hemophilia)
- Marvelous Mbulo – back-up singer (has muscular dystrophy)
- Vusani Vuma – bass marimba player (is hearing-impaired)
- Goodwell Nzou – traditional drums and percussion, back-up singer (leg amputated)
- Farai Mabhande – lead keyboardist (has arthrogryposis)

The band tried to overcome stereotypes and inspire the same people that once saw them as a curse. Her story was later turned into the film Music by Prudence, which went on to win the Academy Award for Best Documentary (Short Subject) at the 82nd Academy Awards.

Music by Prudence also won:

- the Audience Award for Best Documentary Short at the Florida Film Festival
- Best Short at the Africa World Documentary Film Festival
- Best Short at the DocuWest Film Festival.

== Awards ==
Apart from music awards, she also received the 2018 Henry Viscardi Achievement Awards given to leaders in disability sector.
