= The Super Models =

- Promotional poster
- Genre: Documentary
- Directed by: Roger Ross Williams; Larissa Bills
- Country of origin: United States
- Original language: English
- No. of seasons: 1
- No. of episodes: 4

Production
- Executive producers: Roger Ross Williams; Geoff Martz; Brian Grazer; Ron Howard; Sara Bernstein; Justin Wilkes; Barbara Kopple; Naomi Campbell; Cindy Crawford; Linda Evangelista; Christy Turlington Burns
- Producers: Larissa Bills; Tom Grant; Lizz Morhaim; Julia Pontecorvo
- Running time: 48–55 min
- Production companies: Imagine Documentaries; One Story Up

Original release
- Network: Apple TV+
- Release: September 20, 2023

The Super Models is an American documentary series directed by Roger Ross Williams and Larissa Bills. It follows the lives and careers of supermodels Naomi Campbell, Cindy Crawford, Linda Evangelista and Christy Turlington Burns.

It premiered on September 20, 2023, on Apple TV+.

== Premise ==
The series follows the lives and careers of Naomi Campbell, Cindy Crawford, Linda Evangelista and Christy Turlington Burns.

== Episodes ==
No.	Title	Directed by	Original release date
1	"The Look"	Roger Ross Williams; Larissa Bills	September 20, 2023
2	"The Fame"	Roger Ross Williams; Larissa Bills	September 20, 2023
3	"The Power"	Roger Ross Williams; Larissa Bills	September 20, 2023
4	"The Legacy"	Roger Ross Williams; Larissa Bills	September 20, 2023

== Production ==
In October 2020, it was announced Naomi Campbell, Cindy Crawford, Linda Evangelista and Christy Turlington Burns would star in a documentary series, with Barbara Kopple set to direct, and Imagine Documentaries set to produce, alongside Apple TV+ distributing. Roger Ross Williams and Larissa Bills ended up directing the series, with Kopple serving as an executive producer.
