= Jon Henry Gordon =

Makeup artist

- Other names: John Henry Gordon; John Gordon; Jon Gordon
- Occupation: makeup artist
- Years active: 1997-present

Jon Henry Gordon is a makeup artist. He was nominated at the 82nd Academy Awards for his work on the film The Young Victoria in the category of Best Makeup. He shared his nomination with Jenny Shircore.
