= Music by Prudence =

- Directed by: Roger Ross Williams
- Produced by: Roger Ross Williams; Elinor Burkett; Patrick Wright (co-producer)
- Starring: Prudence Mabhena; Tapiwa Nyengera; Energy Maburutse; Honest Mupatse; Marvelous Mbulo; Vusani Vuma; Goodwell Nzou; Farai Mabhande
- Cinematography: Derek Wiesehahn (director of cinematography); Errol Webber; Osato Dixon
- Edited by: Geeta Gandbhir (editor); Patrick Wright (associate editor)
- Production company: iThemba Productions
- Distributed by: HBO
- Release date: April 2010
- Running time: 33 minutes
- Countries: United States; Zimbabwe
- Language: English

Music by Prudence is a 2010 short documentary film directed by Roger Ross Williams. It tells the story of the then 24-year-old Zimbabwean singer-songwriter Prudence Mabhena, and follows her transcendence from a world of hatred and superstition into one of music, love, and possibilities.

Music by Prudence won the 2009 Academy Award for Best Documentary (Short Subject) at the 82nd Academy Awards. The film premiered on HBO on 12 May 2010.

== Synopsis ==
Music by Prudence tells a self-empowering story of one young woman's struggle who, together with her band, overcomes seemingly insurmountable odds and, in her own voice, conveys to the world that "disability does not mean inability."

Zimbabwean singer-songwriter Prudence Mabhena was born severely disabled. The society she was born into considers disabilities to carry the taint of witchcraft. Because of this, many disabled children are abandoned. But Prudence and the seven young members of the band she has formed called Liyana, all disabled, have managed to overcome stereotypes and inspire the same people that once saw them as a curse.

The main subjects of Music by Prudence, and members of the band "Liyana", are:

- Prudence Mabhena – singer and composer (has arthrogryposis)
- Tapiwa Nyengera – back-up singer, keyboard, front man (has spina bifida)
- Energy Maburutse – first marimba player, back-up vocalist (has osteogenesis imperfecta, brittle bone syndrome)
- Honest Mupatse – tenor marimba player (has hemophilia)
- Marvelous Mbulo – back-up singer (has muscular dystrophy)
- Vusani Vuma – bass marimba player (is hearing-impaired)
- Goodwell Nzou – traditional drums and percussion, back-up singer (leg amputated)
- Farai Mabhande – lead keyboardist (also has arthrogryposis)

== Awards ==
On 7 March 2010, Music by Prudence won the 2009 Academy Award for Best Documentary (Short Subject).

Elinor Burkett and Roger Ross Williams clashed during the production of the film, with Burkett claiming that she had initially conceived the project before Williams changed its focus; Williams later denied both assertions. The dispute eventually led to legal action which was settled. However, when the film won the Academy Award, Burkett interrupted Williams during his acceptance speech, which news media likened to Kanye West interrupting Taylor Swift's speech at the MTV Video Music Awards the year before.

== See also ==
- iThemba, another documentary film about Liyana
