= Stamped from the Beginning (film) =

- Directed by: Roger Ross Williams
- Written by: David Teague
- Produced by: Roger Ross Williams; David Teague; Alisa Payne
- Cinematography: Wolfgang Held
- Edited by: John Fisher; Francesca Sharper
- Music by: Nate Wonder; Roman GianArthur
- Production company: One Story Up
- Distributed by: Netflix
- Release dates: September 9, 2023 (TIFF); November 10, 2023
- Running time: 85 minutes
- Country: United States
- Language: English

Stamped from the Beginning is a 2023 American documentary film, directed and produced by Roger Ross Williams. It is based upon the non-fiction book of the same name by Ibram X. Kendi.

It had its world premiere at the 2023 Toronto International Film Festival on September 9, 2023, and was released in a limited release on November 10, 2023, prior to streaming on Netflix on November 20, 2023.

== Premise ==
Based on the non-fiction book of the same name by Ibram X. Kendi, the film explores racist tropes and imagery that were developed and enshrined in American culture throughout history.

== Participants ==
Kendi, Angela Davis, Autumn Womack, Brittany Packnett Cunningham, Brittney Cooper, Carol Anderson, Dorothy Roberts, Elizabeth Hinton, Honorée Jeffers, Imani Perry, Jennifer L. Morgan, Kellie Carter-Jackson, Lynae Vanee, Ruha Benjamin and Stephanie E. Jones-Rogers appear in the film.

== Production ==
In June 2021, it was announced Netflix had acquired the rights to Stamped from the Beginning by Ibram X. Kendi, with Roger Ross Williams set to direct and produce a documentary based upon the book.

== Release ==
The film had its world premiere at the Toronto International Film Festival on September 9, 2023, where it received a 5-minute ovation. It was given a limited release on November 10, 2023, prior to streaming on Netflix on November 20, 2023.

== Reception ==
The documentary has received universal acclaim from critics. On the review aggregator website Rotten Tomatoes, 100% of 27 critics' reviews are positive, with an average rating of 8/10. The website's consensus reads: "Looking pointedly to the past in an effort to help illuminate the present, Stamped from the Beginning is an outstanding documentary achievement."
