= Nine (2009 live-action film) =

2009 romantic musical drama film by Rob Marshall

- Theatrical release poster
- Directed by: Rob Marshall
- Screenplay by: Michael Tolkin; Anthony Minghella
- Based on: Nine by; Maury Yeston; Arthur Kopit; 8½ by; Federico Fellini; Tullio Pinelli; Ennio Flaiano; Brunello Rondi
- Produced by: Rob Marshall; Marc Platt; Harvey Weinstein; John DeLuca
- Starring: Daniel Day-Lewis; Marion Cotillard; Penélope Cruz; Judi Dench; Fergie; Kate Hudson; Nicole Kidman; Sophia Loren
- Cinematography: Dion Beebe
- Edited by: Claire Simpson; Wyatt Smith
- Music by: Andrea Guerra
- Production companies: Relativity Media; Lucamar Productions; Marc Platt Productions
- Distributed by: The Weinstein Company; 01 Distribution (Italy)
- Release dates: December 9, 2009 (Dubai Film Festival); December 25, 2009 (United States); January 15, 2010 (Italy)
- Running time: 118 minutes
- Countries: United States; Italy
- Languages: English; Italian
- Budget: $80 million
- Box office: $54 million

Nine is a 2009 romantic musical drama film directed and co-produced by Rob Marshall from a screenplay by Michael Tolkin and Anthony Minghella, loosely based on the musical of the same name, which in turn is based on the film 8½. In addition to songs from the stage musical, all written by Maury Yeston, the film has three original songs, also written by Yeston ("Take It All", "Cinema Italiano", and "Guarda La Luna"). The ensemble cast includes Daniel Day-Lewis, Marion Cotillard, Penélope Cruz, Judi Dench, Fergie, Kate Hudson, Nicole Kidman, and Sophia Loren.

Nine premiered at the Dubai International Film Festival on December 9, 2009, and had a limited release in New York City and Los Angeles on December 18, with a wide release in the United States on December 25, by The Weinstein Company. 01 Distribution released the film in Italy on January 15, 2010. Though the film received mixed reviews from critics and was a box office failure, the cast and especially Marion Cotillard's performance were praised. Nine was nominated for four Academy Awards: Best Supporting Actress (Penélope Cruz), Best Production Design (John Myhre and Gordon Sim), Best Costume Design (Colleen Atwood), and Best Original Song ("Take It All").

== Plot ==
In 1965, Guido Contini is an Italian filmmaker at the Cinecittà movie studios in Rome. Having turned 50 and developed writer's block, he conjures all the women in his life, both alive and deceased, for inspiration, including: Luisa (née Acari), his wife; Claudia Jenssen, his star actress; Carla Albanese, his mistress; Liliane "Lilli" La Fleur, his costume designer and confidant; Stephanie Necrophorus, an American fashion journalist from Vogue; Saraghina, a prostitute from his childhood; and his Mamma ("Overture Delle Donne").

Having not yet formulated an idea for his new movie, Guido evades reporters' questions. In his mind, he wishes for both youthful naiveté and the wisdom of age ("Guido's Song"). Escaping to the Bellavista Spa Hotel on the coast, he receives a seductive call from Carla while a doctor examines him ("A Call from the Vatican"). She comes to stay with him, but he hides her in a shabby pensione instead.

Dante, Guido's producer, brings much of the film's crew to work at the hotel. When Guido confesses to Lilli his dilemma, she urges him to use his film to entertain, inspired by the Folies Bergère where she "learnt her art" ("Folies Bergère"). Guido remembers Saraghina, a prostitute he and his schoolmates paid to teach them the joy of life's sensual pleasures (the art of love and sex) by dancing for them on a beach when he was nine ("Be Italian") before he was caught by the priests and whipped.

At dinner, Luisa surprises Guido, recounting having abandoned her acting career to be his wife ("My Husband Makes Movies"). Carla arrives, so Luisa storms out; Guido orders Carla back to the pensione, alone and heartbroken. Failing to pacify Luisa, Guido meets Stephanie in the hotel's bar, who confesses that she adores his movies' style rather than their substance ("Cinema Italiano"). She takes him to her room, but while watching her undress, he realizes he still cares for his wife.

Returning to Luisa, he promises to discontinue cheating. As she embraces him, he is called away to help Carla, who has overdosed on pills in attempted suicide. Guido stays with her and dreams of his mother singing him a lullaby when he was young ("Guarda La Luna"), advising him to repair his life. He leaves as Carla's husband Luigi arrives in the morning and returns to find Luisa gone while the film crew leaves for Rome.

Filming in Rome, Guido phones Luisa to come that evening. When his leading lady, Claudia, senses there is no script, he confesses he needs her to inspire one. His idea for the film resembles his own ordeal: a man lost and in love with so many women. Claudia responds that this man is incapable of love and that, while she loves him, she cannot keep playing the same part in his films or his life ("Unusual Way").

While Guido is reviewing screen tests, Luisa arrives and is devastated to see him interact with an actress exactly as when he first met her. After an argument and an angry, imagined striptease ("Take It All"), she permanently leaves him. Finally acknowledging the truth, Guido cancels the film, now abandoned by all those he has selfishly been exploiting ("I Can't Make This Movie"). He admits to the crew that there never was a movie to make, and has the set destroyed before he leaves Rome.

Two years later, at a café in Anguillara, Guido sees an advertisement for a play starring Luisa, whom he sees leave the theater with another man. Lilli suggests he make another movie, but Guido's only idea is a man trying to win back his wife. Sometime later, Guido is making that very film, directing actors representing younger versions of himself and Luisa, living in a small apartment and deeply in love.

Guido's younger self assembles the cast of his entire life on the scaffolding behind him ("Finale") as Luisa arrives and watches from the shadows, happy that Guido has returned to his former self. The younger Guido runs to sit on the elder Guido's lap as fantasy meets reality, and the mature Guido calls, "Action!"

== Cast ==
- Daniel Day-Lewis as Guido Contini, based on Federico Fellini.
  - Giuseppe Spitaleri as young Guido Contini
- Marion Cotillard as Luisa Acari Contini, based on Giulietta Masina, Fellini's wife.
- Penélope Cruz as Carla Albanese, based on Anna Giovannini, Fellini's mistress.
- Nicole Kidman as Claudia Jenssen, based on movie star Anita Ekberg.
- Judi Dench as Liliane La Fleur, a costume designer.
- Kate Hudson as Stephanie Necrophorus, a Vogue fashion journalist.
- Sophia Loren as Mamma Contini, Guido's mother.
- Fergie as Saraghina, a prostitute.
- Ricky Tognazzi as Dante, Guido's producer.
- Giuseppe Cederna as Fausto
- Elio Germano as Pierpaolo
- Valerio Mastandrea as De Rossi
- Martina Stella as Donatella
- Roberto Citran as Dr. Rondi
- Andy Pessoa as Italian boy
- Max Procaccini as The Business Man
- John Terry as Marvin
- Vincent Riotta as Luigi

== Production ==
=== Development ===
On April 12, 2007, Variety announced Rob Marshall would direct a feature film adaptation of Nine for The Weinstein Company. Marshall had previously directed Chicago for the Weinsteins while they were still at Miramax. The film was co-produced by Marshall's own production company, Lucamar Productions.

=== Casting ===
On April 16, 2007, it was reported that producer Harvey Weinstein was considering Gwyneth Paltrow, Anne Hathaway, Jennifer Lopez, Nicole Kidman, Judi Dench, Catherine Zeta-Jones and Renée Zellweger for the six major female roles in Nine, and that Weinstein and director Rob Marshall were also considering George Clooney, Javier Bardem, Antonio Banderas and Johnny Depp for the role of Guido.

On August 20, 2007, Variety announced that Javier Bardem, Marion Cotillard and Penélope Cruz were in talks to star in Nine in the roles of Guido, Luisa, and Carla, respectively. Variety also reported that Marshall was courting Catherine Zeta-Jones–with whom he had worked in Chicago (2002)–for the role of Guido's muse, and Sophia Loren for the role of Guido's mother. In September 2007, Marshall confirmed that all of the five actors had been cast.

On November 19, 2007, it was reported that Catherine Zeta-Jones had turned down the role of Claudia when director Rob Marshall refused to expand the role for the film, and that Natalie Portman, Gwyneth Paltrow, Liv Tyler, Keira Knightley and Kate Hudson were being considered as possible replacements. On April 3, 2008, it was reported that Nicole Kidman and Judi Dench were in talks to star in the film. Nine was Kidman's first big-screen musical since Moulin Rouge!.

On May 14, 2008, Variety reported that Daniel Day-Lewis was in talks to star as Guido Contini, the film's lead character, after Javier Bardem dropped out due to exhaustion. On May 19, 2008, People reported the actor had landed the role. Antonio Banderas, who had starred in the Broadway revival, said he was "disappointed" at not being cast, but that he thought the trailer to the film looked great and only wished the "best" for everyone involved.

Marion Cotillard originally auditioned for the role of Lilli, but ended up being cast as Luisa. Cotillard received a call from her French agent saying that director Rob Marshall wanted her to audition for his next musical. In her first audition, she sang the song "Claudia". Following her second audition, she was asked to come back for another audition for the role of Luisa, and she got the part in her third audition after singing "My Husband Makes Movies".

On July 15, 2008, the Chicago Tribune reported that Kate Hudson had been cast in a role created specifically for her, which had not been featured in the Broadway show. Anne Hathaway and Sienna Miller had both auditioned for the role of Stephanie, which ended up going to Hudson. On July 18, 2008, People reported Fergie had been cast as Saraghina. Katie Holmes, Jennifer Lopez and Demi Moore auditioned for unknown roles but neither were cast.

=== Filming ===
Rehearsals for the film began in August 2008, the songs were recorded in late September, and filming commenced in October at Shepperton Studios, London. Further filming took place in Italy (in the villages of Anzio and Sutri), and at Cinecittà Film Studios. Nine's schedule required Kidman to begin rehearsals just six weeks after giving birth to her daughter. Kidman said she accepted to do Nine because she was allowed to bring her daughter to the set. The other women who worked in the film helped Kidman babysit her baby.

Day-Lewis knew some Italian for the role. According to music supervisor Matt Sullivan,

"One day during shooting at London's Shepperton Studios, Rob and I got called into Daniel's dressing room, which was designed as a 1960s film director's office...He's smoking a cigarette, in full outfit and in character, and he's telling us how he would like to see this number that he's performing. And he's talking to us as Guido Contini. It was a really surreal experience."

=== Marketing ===
The teaser trailer for the film was released by Apple on May 14, 2009.

On July 18, 2009, a clip from the film was featured in an episode of the Food Network show, Barefoot Contessa, with the host, Ina Garten, making breakfast and lunch for her friends, producers John DeLuca and Rob Marshall, as they edited their new film, at the end being a "preview" of their film for the host to see in appreciation.

On November 17, 2009, Dancing With The Stars had a routine set to the song "Be Italian" with dancers wearing outfits from the film. On November 22, 2009, a two-minute trailer from Nine was shown simultaneously on Lifetime, ABC Family, Soapnet, A&E and Bio and was also shown during the American Music Awards on ABC.

In December 2009, the film contracted the soap operas All My Children, One Life to Live and General Hospital for advertising purposes. The former featured two of the characters watching one of the film's trailers on the Internet on a YouTube-esque website, and there were subtle setting alterations performed for the latter, including movie posters on the walls of various public places.

In a 2018 interview with The New Yorker, Rob Marshall revealed that he believes the Weinstein Company failed to market the film properly as it was a trickier sell than Chicago and should have started in festivals and smaller venues. He also said, "I did feel somewhat compromised working on it. Everything on the screen wasn't fully my perfect version of it."

== Music ==
Nine (Original Motion Picture Soundtrack) was released through Geffen Records on December 22, 2009. The album featured 16 songs, based on the musical, along with three new songs created for the film by original Broadway composer Maury Yeston. The film soundtrack peaked at number twenty-six on the Billboard 200. It also peaked at number three on the Polish Albums Chart and at number nine on the Greek Albums Chart.

== Release ==
Nine premiered at the Dubai International Film Festival on December 9, 2009, and had a limited release in New York City and Los Angeles on December 18, with a wide release in the United States on December 25, by The Weinstein Company.

== Reception ==
Nine received generally mixed reviews, although the performances of the cast were praised by critics. As of September 2024, the film holds a 39% approval rating on review aggregate Rotten Tomatoes based on 208 reviews, with an average rating of 5.20/10. The critical consensus is: "It has a game, great-looking cast, led by the always worthwhile Daniel Day-Lewis, but Rob Marshall's Nine is chaotic and curiously distant." On Metacritic, the film has an average rating of 49/100 from 33 reviews, indicating "mixed or average reviews". The film was also a commercial failure: it grossed $19 million domestically and less than $54 million worldwide, against an $80 million budget.

Todd McCarthy of Variety called the film "a savvy piece of musical filmmaking. Sophisticated, sexy and stylishly decked out, Rob Marshall’s disciplined, tightly focused film impresses and amuses as it extravagantly renders the creative crisis of a middle-aged Italian director, circa 1965".

Richard Corliss of TIME magazine wrote that "Only Cotillard, as Guido's long-suffering wife Luisa, is in command of her character whether she's singing, speaking or just staring darts at her philandering mate." Corliss also praised Cotillard's rendition of "My Husband Makes Movies", calling it a "lovely scene" and "a moment of emotional truth at the heart of this expertly made but hollow enterprise."

For Ali Plumb of Empire magazine, "Though slightly marred by a clunky structure and a lack of truly catchy tunes, Nine's wall-to-wall first-rate performances from its stellar cast (especially Cotillard) add a touch of class."

Nicholas Barber of The Independent wrote; "Apart from a touching ballad performed by Cotillard, as Day-Lewis's wronged wife, you could cut out any of them [songs] without affecting the story, mainly because there isn't much of a story to affect."

Alistair Harkness of The Scotsman called Nine "the worst film of the year" for "its absolute awfulness, for its mind-numbing shallowness, for its smug and self-satisfied cast, and for its ability to wreck Daniel Day-Lewis's otherwise unblemished record."

TIME magazine ranked Cotillard's performance in Nine as the fifth best female performance of 2009.

In a 2018 interview with The New Yorker, Marshall revealed that he felt Nine failed because the Weinstein Company didn't market the film properly as it was a trickier sell than Chicago and should have started in festivals and smaller venues. He also admitted that "I did feel somewhat compromised working on it. Everything on the screen wasn’t fully my perfect version of it."

In Joshua Rosenblum's 2026 biography A Very Unusual Way, Maury Yeston expressed his love for the film, saying "For me, it was a triple-plus positive experience, every step".

== Accolades ==
Award	Category	Nominee	Result
Academy Awards	Best Supporting Actress	Penélope Cruz	Nominated
Academy Awards	Best Production Design	John Myhre and Gordon Sim	Nominated
Academy Awards	Best Costume Design	Colleen Atwood	Nominated
Academy Awards	Best Original Song	"Take It All"; Music & Lyrics by Maury Yeston	Nominated
American Society of Cinematographers Awards	Outstanding Achievement in Cinematography in Theatrical Releases	Dion Beebe	Nominated
British Academy Film Awards	Best Makeup and Hair	Peter King	Nominated
Costume Designers Guild Awards	Excellence in Period Film	Colleen Atwood	Nominated
Critics' Choice Movie Awards	Best Picture	Nine	Nominated
Critics' Choice Movie Awards	Best Supporting Actress	Marion Cotillard	Nominated
Critics' Choice Movie Awards	Best Acting Ensemble	Nine	Nominated
Critics' Choice Movie Awards	Best Art Direction	John Myhre and Gordon Sim	Nominated
Critics' Choice Movie Awards	Best Cinematography	Dion Beebe	Nominated
Critics' Choice Movie Awards	Best Costume Design	Colleen Atwood	Nominated
Critics' Choice Movie Awards	Best Editing	Claire Simpson and Wyatt Smith	Nominated
Critics' Choice Movie Awards	Best Makeup	Nine	Nominated
Critics' Choice Movie Awards	Best Song	"Cinema Italiano" by Maury Yeston	Nominated
Critics' Choice Movie Awards	Best Sound	Nine	Nominated
Dallas–Fort Worth Film Critics Association Awards	Best Supporting Actress	Marion Cotillard	Nominated
Detroit Film Critics Society Awards	Best Supporting Actress	Marion Cotillard	Nominated
Golden Globe Awards	Best Motion Picture - Musical or Comedy	Nine	Nominated
Golden Globe Awards	Best Actor in a Motion Picture Musical or Comedy	Daniel Day-Lewis	Nominated
Golden Globe Awards	Best Actress in a Motion Picture Musical or Comedy	Marion Cotillard	Nominated
Golden Globe Awards	Best Supporting Actress – Motion Picture	Penélope Cruz	Nominated
Golden Globe Awards	Best Original Song	"Cinema Italiano"; Music & Lyrics by Maury Yeston	Nominated
Houston Film Critics Society Awards	Best Supporting Actress	Penélope Cruz	Nominated
Houston Film Critics Society Awards	Best Cinematography	Dion Beebe	Nominated
Houston Film Critics Society Awards	Best Original Song	"Cinema Italiano" by Maury Yeston	Nominated
Satellite Awards	Best Motion Picture – Comedy or Musical	Nine	Won
Satellite Awards	Best Director	Rob Marshall	Nominated
Satellite Awards	Best Actor – Comedy or Musical	Daniel Day-Lewis	Nominated
Satellite Awards	Best Actress – Comedy or Musical	Marion Cotillard	Nominated
Satellite Awards	Best Supporting Actress – Motion Picture	Penélope Cruz	Nominated
Satellite Awards	Best Cinematography	Dion Beebe	Won
Satellite Awards	Best Costume Design	Colleen Atwood	Nominated
Satellite Awards	Best Film Editing	Claire Simpson and Wyatt Smith	Nominated
Satellite Awards	Best Original Song	"Cinema Italiano" by Maury Yeston	Nominated
Satellite Awards	Best Sound	Roberto Fernandez, Jim Greenhorn, Wylie Stateman and Renée Tondelli	Nominated
Satellite Awards	Best Cast – Motion Picture	Daniel Day-Lewis, Marion Cotillard, Sophia Loren, Judi Dench, Nicole Kidman, Penélope Cruz, Fergie and Kate Hudson	Won
Saturn Awards	Best Costume Design	Colleen Atwood	Nominated
Screen Actors Guild Awards	Outstanding Cast in a Motion Picture	Daniel Day-Lewis, Marion Cotillard, Sophia Loren, Judi Dench, Nicole Kidman, Penélope Cruz, Fergie and Kate Hudson	Nominated
Screen Actors Guild Awards	Outstanding Female Actor in a Supporting Role	Penélope Cruz	Nominated
St. Louis Gateway Film Critics Association Awards	Best Supporting Actress	Marion Cotillard	Nominated
St. Louis Gateway Film Critics Association Awards	Best Cinematography	Dion Beebe	Won
St. Louis Gateway Film Critics Association Awards	Best Music	Nine	Won
Washington D.C. Area Film Critics Association Awards	Best Cast	Nine	Won
Washington D.C. Area Film Critics Association Awards	Best Art Direction	Nine	Won

== Home media ==
Nine was released on DVD and Blu-ray May 4, 2010. The DVD featured an audio commentary by director Rob Marshall and producer John DeLuca, 8 featurettes, and 3 music videos. The Blu-ray Disc included all the DVD extras including another featurette and a Screen Actors Guild Q&A.
