= Take It All (song) =

Song by Marion Cotillard

from the album Nine (Original Motion Picture Soundtrack)
- Genre: Show tune
- Length: 3:03
- Label: Geffen
- Composer(s): Maury Yeston
- Lyricist(s): Maury Yeston
- Producer(s): Rob Marshall; John DeLuca; Matthew Rush Sullivan; Paul Bogaev

Music video
- "Take It All" on YouTube

"Take It All" is a song written by Maury Yeston for the 2009 musical film Nine, a film adaptation of the musical Nine. The song is performed by Luisa Contini (Marion Cotillard). It was nominated for an Academy Award for Best Original Song at the 82nd Academy Awards. The official music video for the song has over 2 million views on YouTube.

== Production ==
The song was "one of the new songs written expressly for the film".

Composer Maury Yeston gave some insight into the song's production:

“Take It All” obviously is a far grittier and more emotionally captivating song in which we’ve got a woman finally putting her foot down and walking out on a man. More than that, she’s really visiting upon him a man’s worst nightmare, which is seeing his wife ravaged by another. And so she simultaneously regains her self-respect and devastates him. It features the almost clichéd language of stripping and then suddenly, “Do you want my soul?” And a gear turns. It was Nine director Rob Marshall’s idea that we should see his wife stripped bare like that. I think Marion Cotillard does a beautiful job.

== Critical reception ==
ReelViews wrote "The film's most powerful song, "Take It All," is delivered by Marion Cotillard with a level of passion and intensity that surpasses any non-singing moment". The site also suggestion that the desire to retain a PG-13 rating "restrained Marshall from taking a few of the numbers a little further (in particular, "Take It All" and "Be Italian")".

== Accolades ==
Year	Awards Ceremony	Category	Result	Ref.
2010	Academy Awards	Best Original Song	Nominated	
