= 82nd Academy Awards =

- Official poster
- Date: March 7, 2010
- Site: Kodak Theatre; Hollywood, Los Angeles, California, U.S.
- Hosted by: Alec Baldwin; Steve Martin
- Preshow hosts: Jess Cagle; Kathy Ireland; Sherri Shepherd
- Produced by: Bill Mechanic; Adam Shankman
- Directed by: Hamish Hamilton

Highlights
- Best Picture: The Hurt Locker
- Most awards: The Hurt Locker (6)
- Most nominations: Avatar and The Hurt Locker (9)

TV in the United States
- Network: ABC
- Duration: 3 hours, 37 minutes
- Ratings: 41.62 million 24.89% (Nielsen ratings)

The 82nd Academy Awards ceremony, presented by the Academy of Motion Picture Arts and Sciences (AMPAS), honored the best films of 2009 and took place on March 7, 2010, at the Kodak Theatre in Hollywood, Los Angeles, beginning at 5:30 p.m. PST / 8:30 p.m. EST. The ceremony was scheduled after its usual late-February date to avoid conflicting with the 2010 Winter Olympics. During the ceremony, the Academy of Motion Picture Arts and Sciences presented Academy Awards (commonly referred to as Oscars) in 24 categories. The ceremony was televised in the United States by ABC, and was produced by Bill Mechanic and Adam Shankman and directed by Hamish Hamilton. Actors Alec Baldwin and Steve Martin hosted the show. Martin hosted for the third time; he first presided over the 73rd ceremony held in 2001 and last hosted the 75th ceremony held in 2003, while this was Baldwin's first Oscars hosting stint. This was also the first telecast to have multiple hosts since the 59th ceremony held in 1987.

On June 24, 2009, Academy president Sid Ganis announced at a press conference that, in an attempt to revitalize interest surrounding the awards, the 2010 ceremony would feature ten Best Picture nominees instead of five, a practice that had been discontinued after the 16th ceremony in 1944. On February 20, 2010, in a ceremony at the Beverly Wilshire Hotel in Beverly Hills, California, the Academy Awards for Technical Achievement were presented by host Elizabeth Banks.

The Hurt Locker won six awards, including Best Picture. Other winners were Avatar with three awards, Crazy Heart, Precious: Based on the Novel 'Push' by Sapphire, and Up with two, and The Blind Side, The Cove, Inglourious Basterds, Logorama, Music by Prudence, The New Tenants, The Secret in Their Eyes, Star Trek, and The Young Victoria with one. The telecast garnered nearly 42 million viewers in the United States, making it the most watched Oscar telecast since the 77th Academy Awards in 2005.

== Winners and nominees ==
The nominees for the 82nd Academy Awards were announced on February 2, 2010, at 5:38 a.m. PST (13:38 UTC) at the Samuel Goldwyn Theater in Beverly Hills, California, by Tom Sherak, president of the Academy, and actress Anne Hathaway. Avatar and The Hurt Locker led the nominations with nine each.

The winners were announced during the awards ceremony on March 7, 2010. Kathryn Bigelow made history as the first female to win the Academy Award for Best Director. Precious: Based on the Novel 'Push' by Sapphire became the first film directed by a Black director to be nominated for Best Picture. Up became the second animated film to be nominated for Best Picture after 1991's Beauty and the Beast. Best Adapted Screenplay winner Geoffrey Fletcher was the first African-American winner of a screenwriting Oscar. Meryl Streep received her thirtheenth nomination for Best Actress in a Leading Role, beting Katharine Hepburn as the most nominated actress in this category.

=== Awards ===
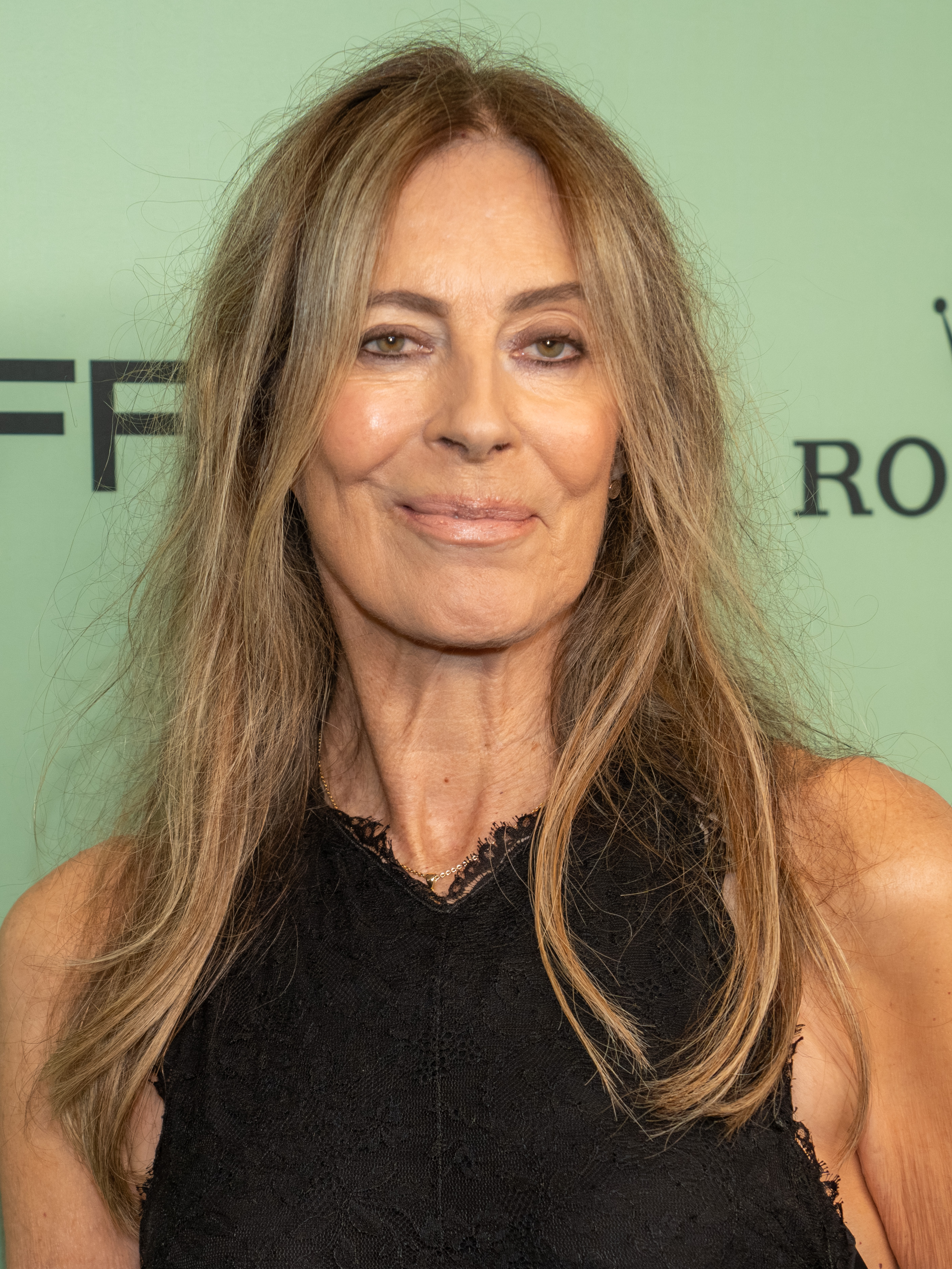
Kathryn Bigelow, Best Picture co-winner and Best Director winner

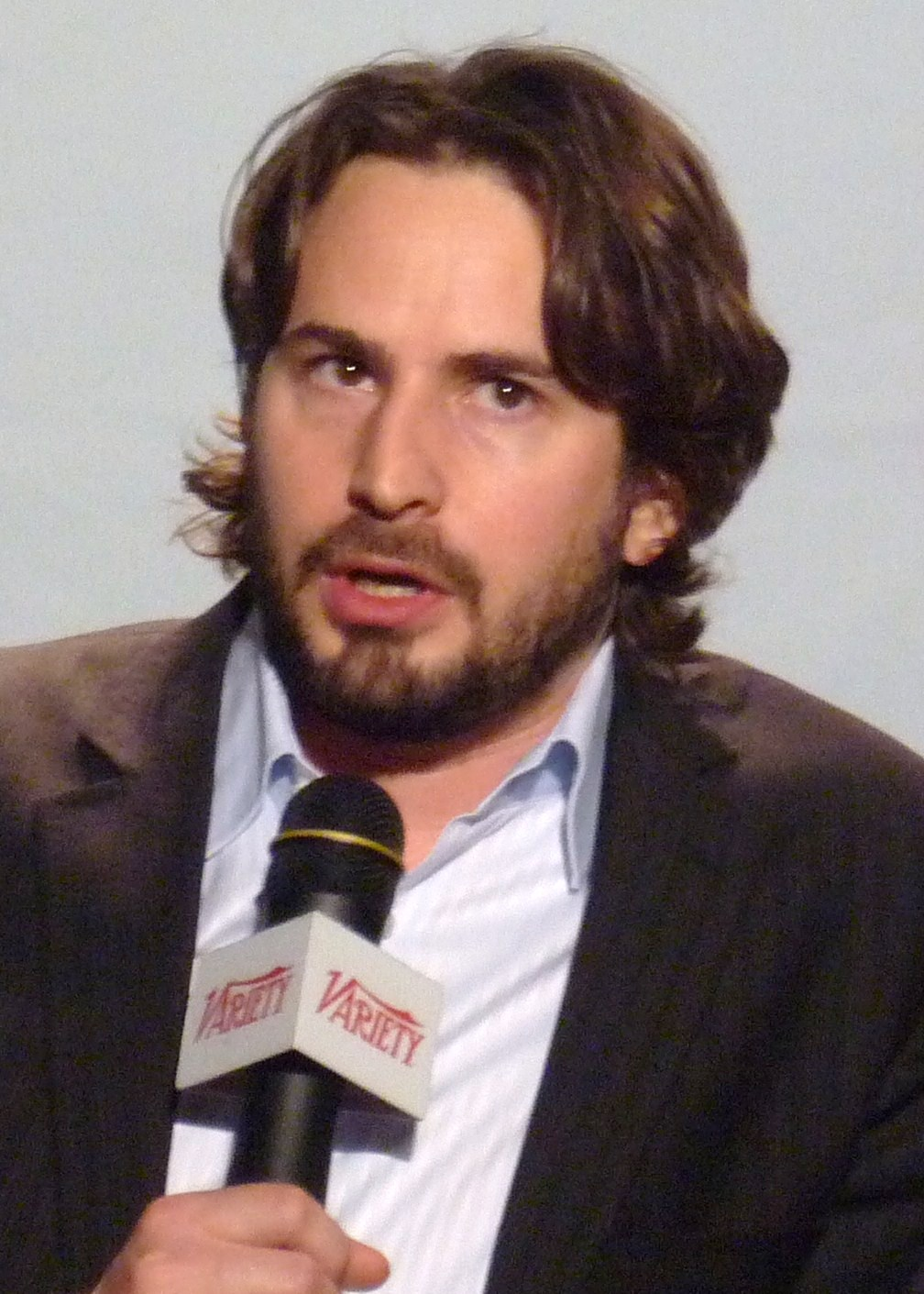
Mark Boal, Best Picture co-winner and Best Original Screenplay winner

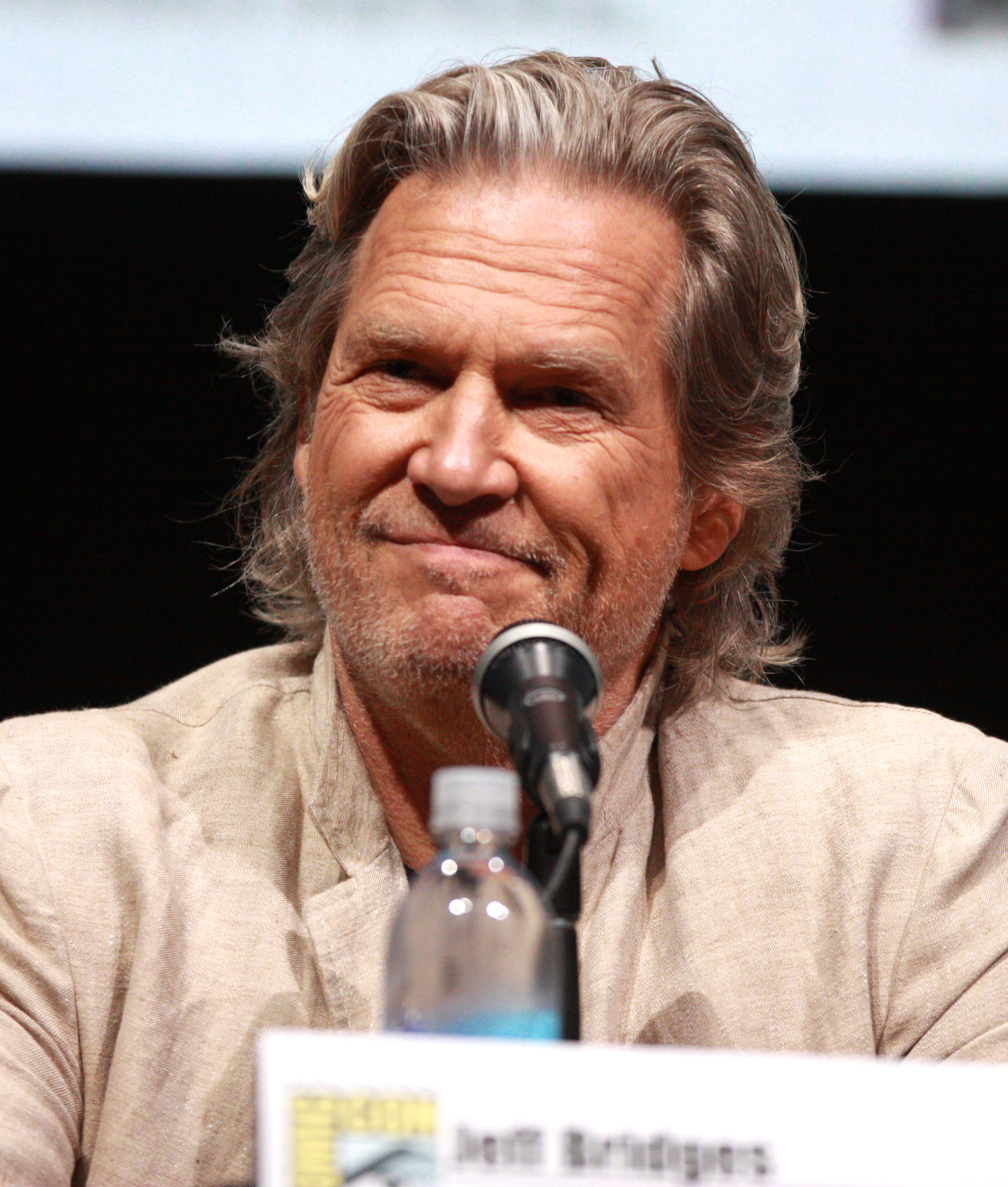
Jeff Bridges, Best Actor winner

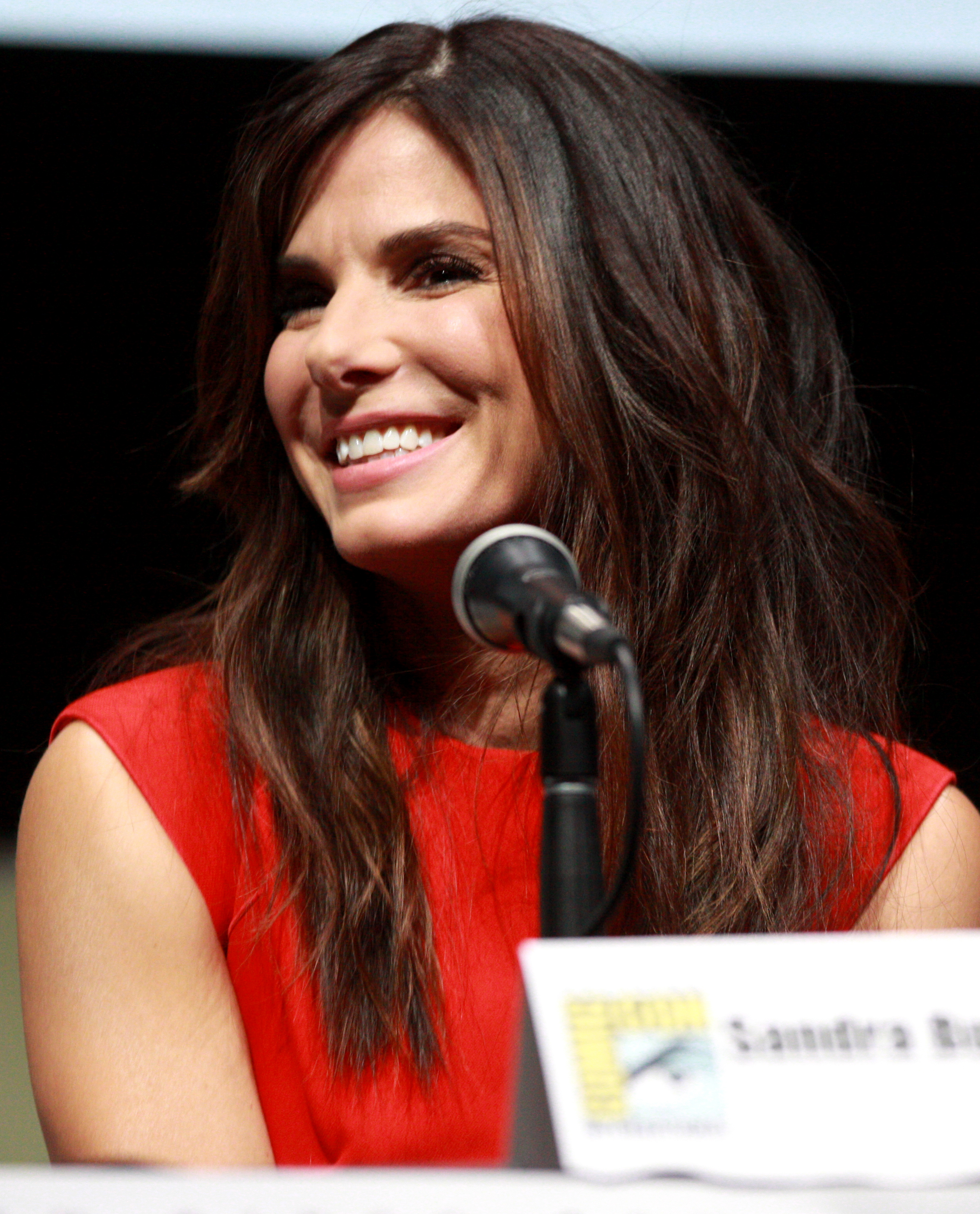
Sandra Bullock, Best Actress winner

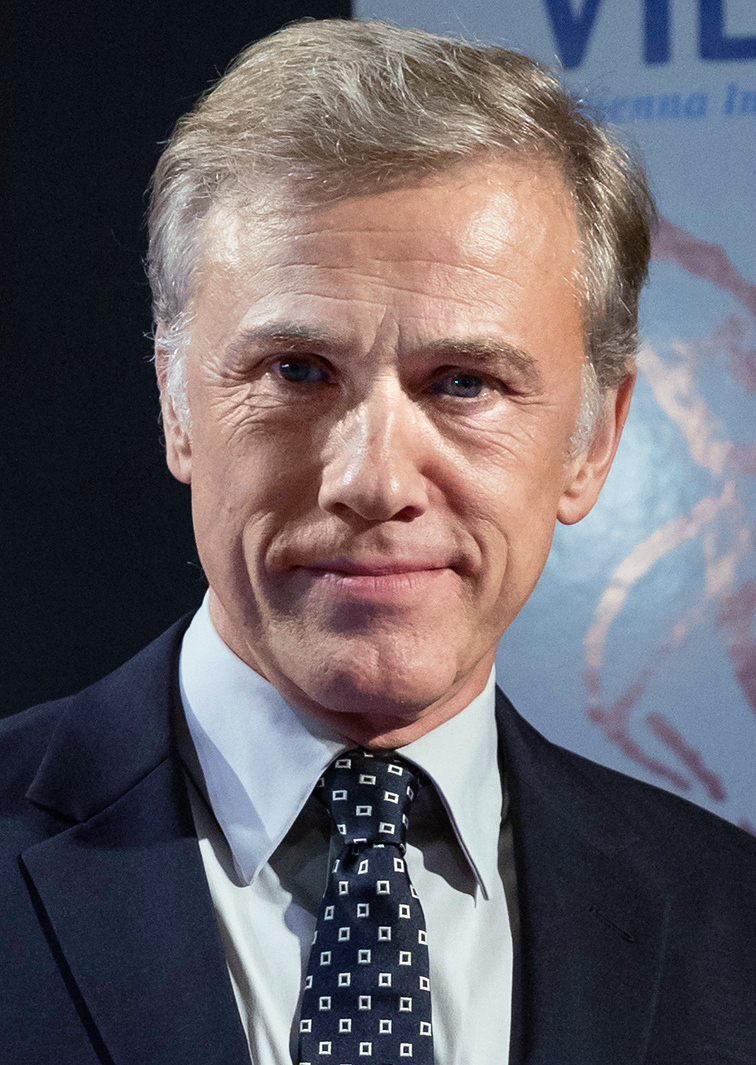
Christoph Waltz, Best Supporting Actor winner

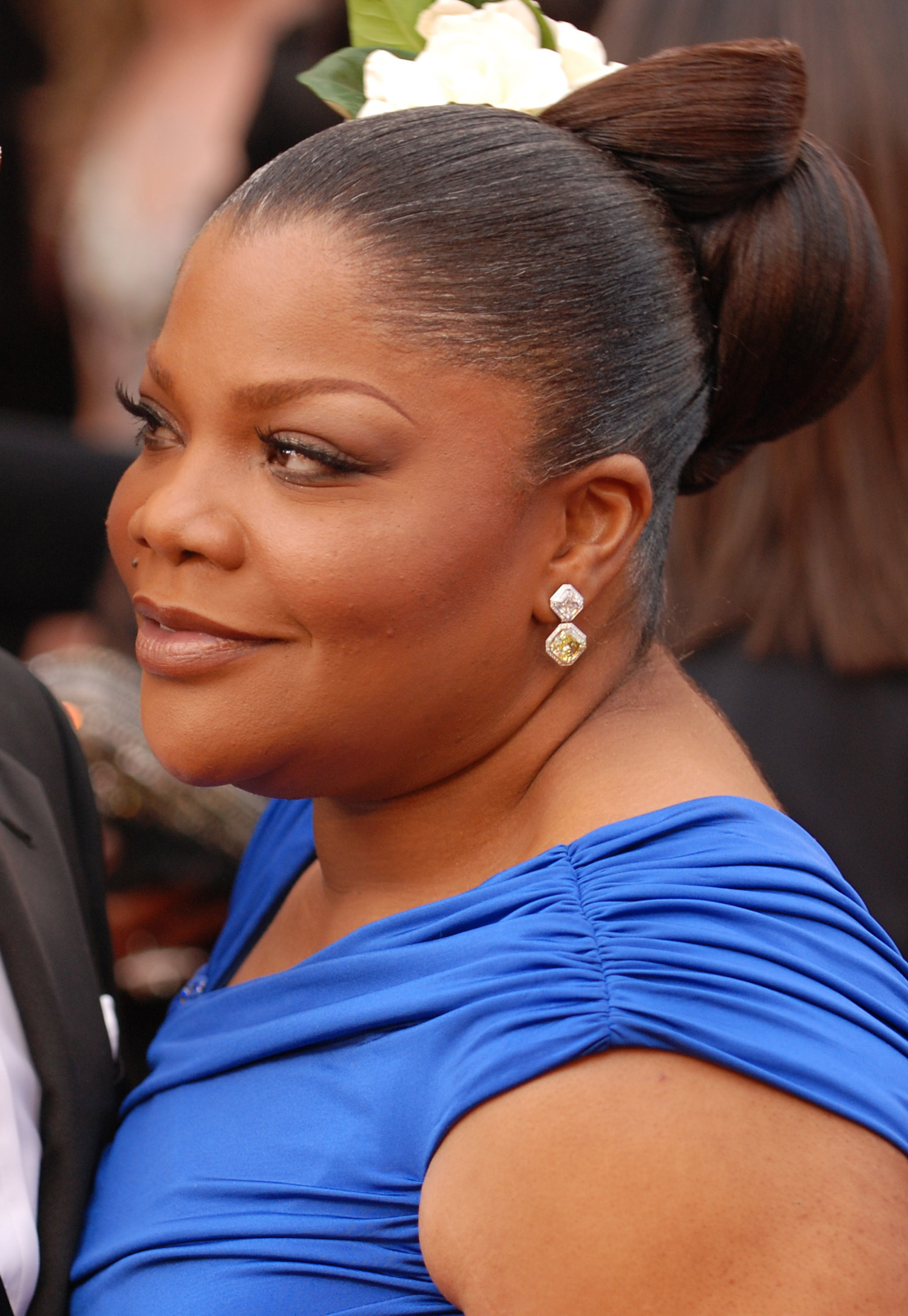
Mo'Nique, Best Supporting Actress winner

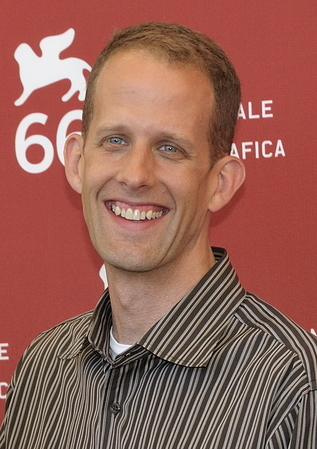
Pete Docter, Best Animated Feature Film winner

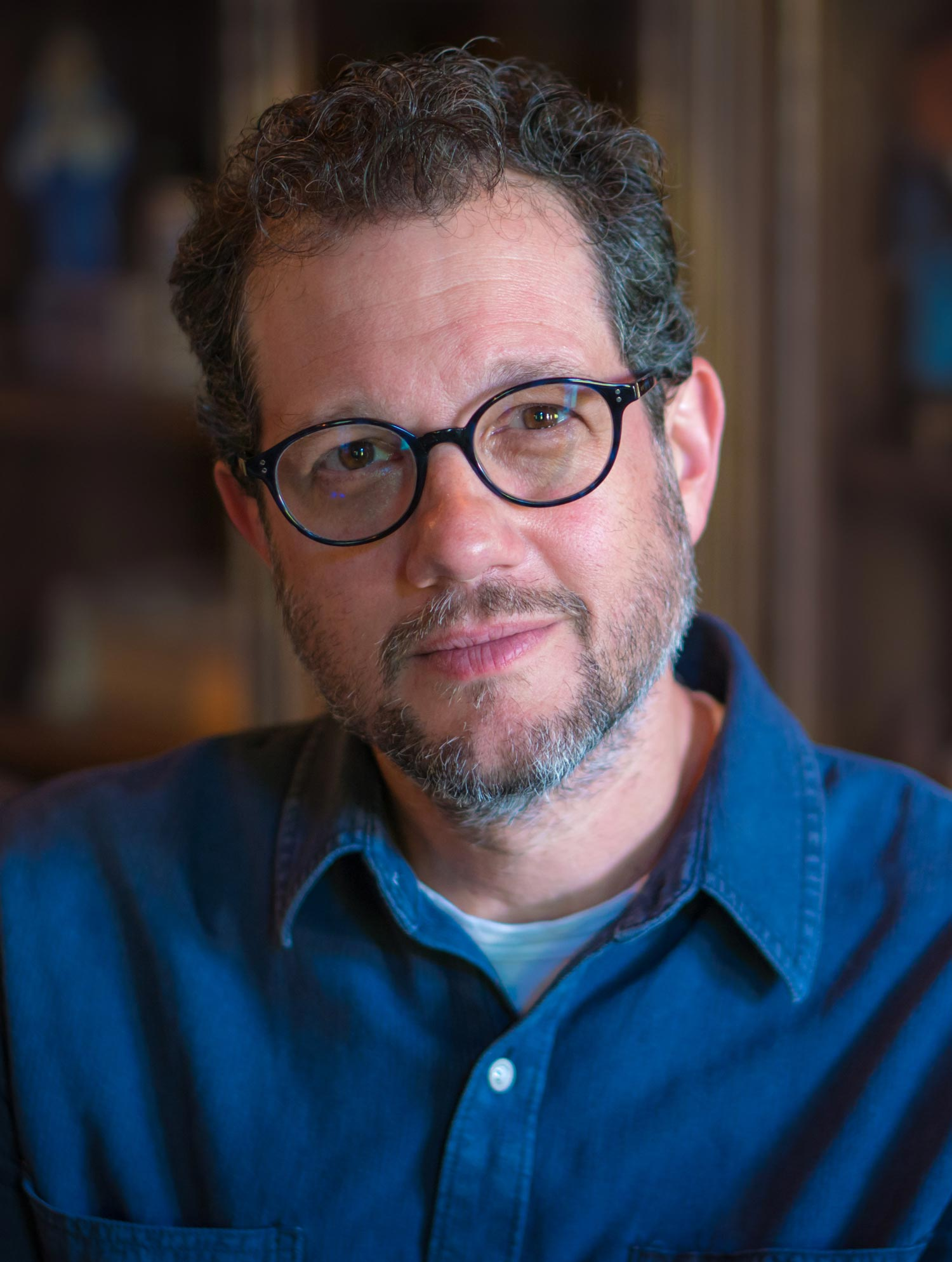
Michael Giacchino, Best Original Score winner

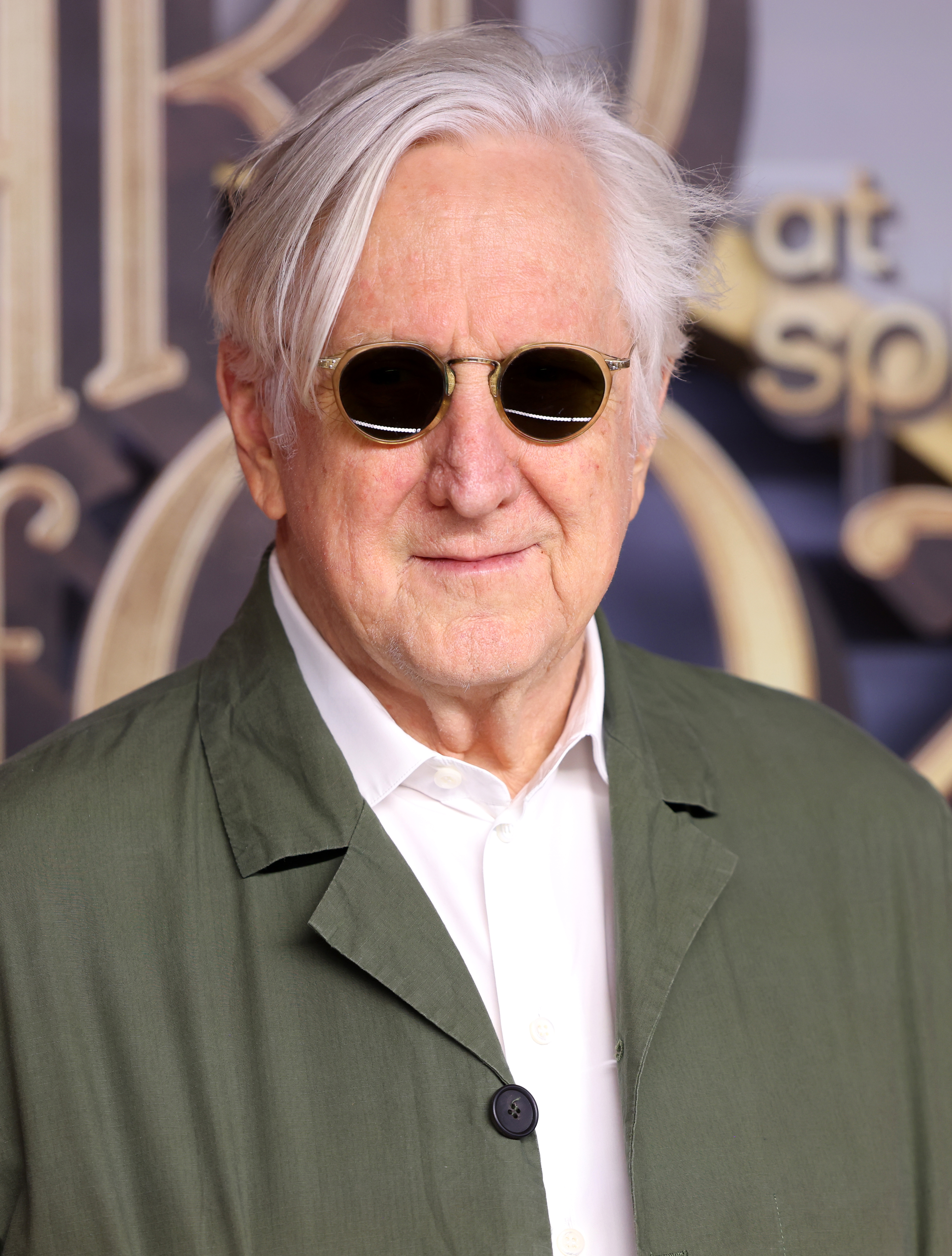
T Bone Burnett, Best Original Song co-winner

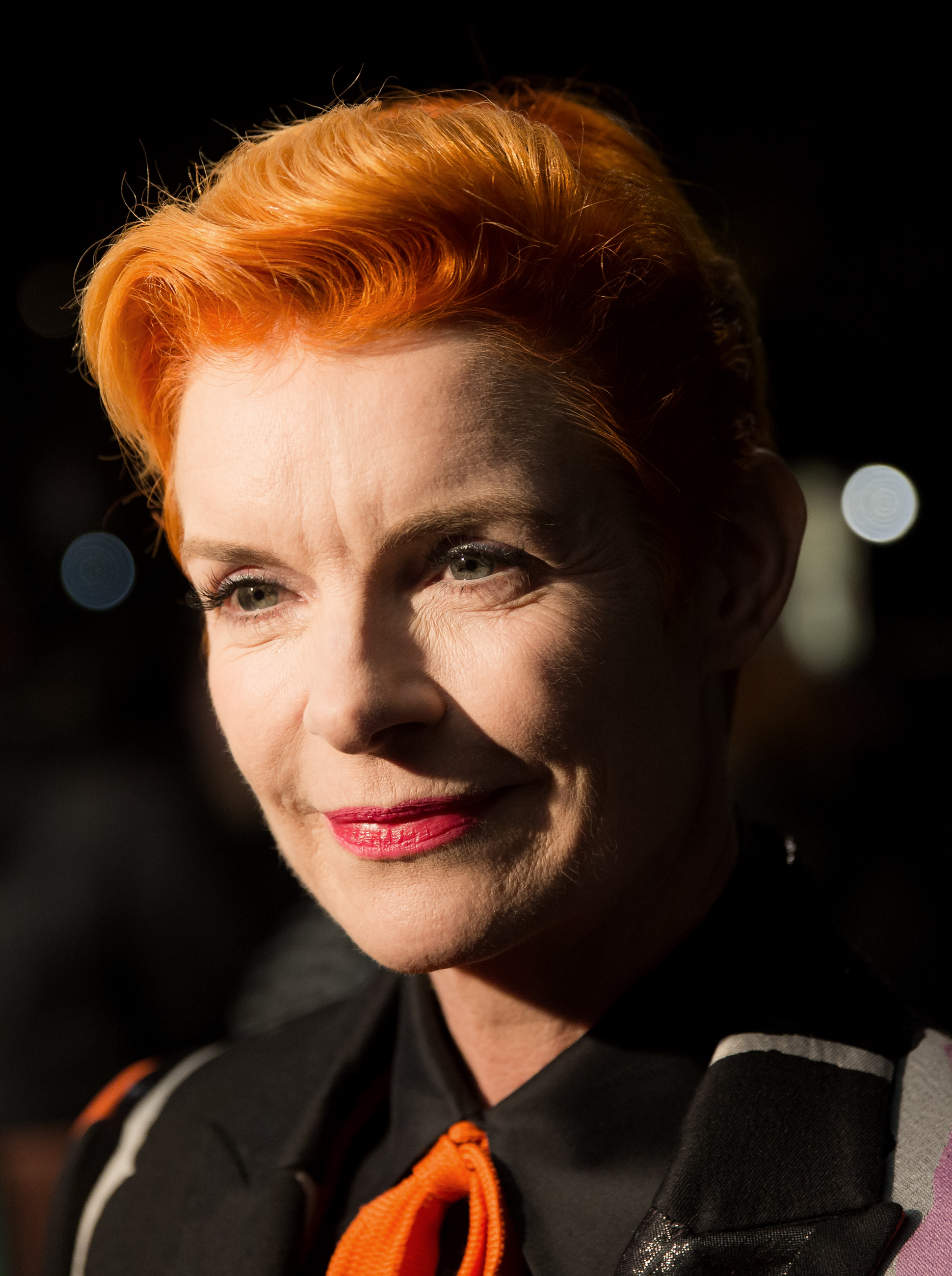
Sandy Powell, Best Costume Design winner

Winners are listed first, highlighted in boldface and indicated with a double dagger (‡).

| **Best Picture**: **The Hurt Locker – Kathryn Bigelow, Mark Boal, Nicolas Chartier and Greg Shapiro, producers**‡; Avatar – James Cameron and Jon Landau, producers; The Blind Side – Gil Netter, Andrew A. Kosove and Broderick Johnson, producers; District 9 – Peter Jackson and Carolynne Cunningham, producers; An Education – Finola Dwyer and Amanda Posey, producers; Inglourious Basterds – Lawrence Bender, producer; Precious: Based on the Novel 'Push' by Sapphire – Lee Daniels, Sarah Siegel-Magness and Gary Magness, producers; A Serious Man – Joel Coen and Ethan Coen, producers; Up – Jonas Rivera, producer; Up in the Air – Daniel Dubiecki, Ivan Reitman and Jason Reitman, producers | **Best Directing**: **Kathryn Bigelow – The Hurt Locker**‡; James Cameron – Avatar; Quentin Tarantino – Inglourious Basterds; Lee Daniels – Precious: Based on the Novel 'Push' by Sapphire; Jason Reitman – Up in the Air |
| **Best Actor in a Leading Role**: **Jeff Bridges – Crazy Heart as Otis "Bad" Blake**‡; George Clooney – Up in the Air as Ryan Bingham; Colin Firth – A Single Man as George Falconer; Morgan Freeman – Invictus as Nelson Mandela; Jeremy Renner – The Hurt Locker as Sergeant First Class William James | **Best Actress in a Leading Role**: **Sandra Bullock – The Blind Side as Leigh Anne Tuohy**‡; Helen Mirren – The Last Station as Sophia Tolstaya; Carey Mulligan – An Education as Jenny Mellor; Gabourey Sidibe – Precious: Based on the Novel 'Push' by Sapphire as Claireece "Precious" Jones; Meryl Streep – Julie & Julia as Julia Child |
| **Best Actor in a Supporting Role**: **Christoph Waltz – Inglourious Basterds as Col. Hans Landa**‡; Matt Damon – Invictus as Francois Pienaar; Woody Harrelson – The Messenger as Cpt. Tony Stone; Christopher Plummer – The Last Station as Leo Tolstoy; Stanley Tucci – The Lovely Bones as George Harvey | **Best Actress in a Supporting Role**: **Mo'Nique – Precious: Based on the Novel 'Push' by Sapphire as Mary Lee Johnston**‡; Penélope Cruz – Nine as Carla Albanese; Vera Farmiga – Up in the Air as Alex Goran; Maggie Gyllenhaal – Crazy Heart as Jean Craddock; Anna Kendrick – Up in the Air as Natalie Keener |
| **Best Writing (Original Screenplay)**: **The Hurt Locker – Mark Boal**‡; Inglourious Basterds – Quentin Tarantino; The Messenger – Alessandro Camon and Oren Moverman; A Serious Man – Joel Coen and Ethan Coen; Up – Screenplay by Bob Peterson and Pete Docter; Story by Pete Docter, Bob Peterson and Tom McCarthy | **Best Writing (Adapted Screenplay)**: **Precious: Based on the Novel 'Push' by Sapphire – Geoffrey Fletcher; based on the novel Push by Sapphire**‡; District 9 – Neill Blomkamp and Terri Tatchell; based on the short film Alive in Joburg by Neill Blomkamp; An Education – Nick Hornby; based on the memoir by Lynn Barber; In the Loop – Jesse Armstrong, Simon Blackwell, Armando Iannucci and Tony Roche; based on the character Malcolm Tucker, who originally appeared in the BBC TV show The Thick of It; Up in the Air – Jason Reitman and Sheldon Turner; based on the novel by Walter Kirn |
| **Best Animated Feature Film**: **Up – Directed by Pete Docter**‡; Coraline – Directed by Henry Selick; Fantastic Mr. Fox – Directed by Wes Anderson; The Princess and the Frog – Directed by John Musker and Ron Clements; The Secret of Kells – Directed by Tomm Moore | **Best Foreign Language Film**: **The Secret in Their Eyes (Argentina) in Spanish – Directed by Juan José Campanella**‡; Ajami (Israel) in Arabic and Hebrew – Directed by Scandar Copti and Yaron Shani; The Milk of Sorrow (Peru) in Spanish and Quechua – Directed by Claudia Llosa; A Prophet (France) in French, Corsican and Arabic – Directed by Jacques Audiard; The White Ribbon (Germany) in German – Directed by Michael Haneke |
| **Best Documentary (Feature)**: **The Cove – Louie Psihoyos and Fisher Stevens**‡; Burma VJ – Anders Østergaard and Lise Lense-Møller; Food, Inc. – Robert Kenner and Elise Pearlstein; The Most Dangerous Man in America: Daniel Ellsberg and the Pentagon Papers – Judith Ehrlich and Rick Goldsmith; Which Way Home – Rebecca Cammisa | **Best Documentary (Short Subject)**: **Music by Prudence – Roger Ross Williams and Elinor Burkett**‡; China's Unnatural Disaster: The Tears of Sichuan Province – Jon Alpert and Matthew O'Neill; The Last Campaign of Governor Booth Gardner – Daniel Junge and Henry Ansbacher; The Last Truck: Closing of a GM Plant – Steven Bognar and Julia Reichert; Rabbit à la Berlin – Bartek Konopka and Anna Wydra |
| **Best Short Film (Live Action)**: **The New Tenants – Joachim Back and Tivi Magnusson**‡; The Door – Juanita Wilson and James Flynn; Instead of Abracadabra – Patrik Eklund and Mathias Fjellström; Kavi – Gregg Helvey; Miracle Fish – Luke Doolan and Drew Bailey | **Best Short Film (Animated)**: **Logorama – Nicolas Schmerkin**‡; French Roast – Fabrice O. Joubert; Granny O'Grimm's Sleeping Beauty – Nicky Phelan and Darragh O'Connell; The Lady and the Reaper – Javier Recio Gracia; A Matter of Loaf and Death – Nick Park |
| **Best Music (Original Score)**: **Up – Michael Giacchino**‡; Avatar – James Horner; Fantastic Mr. Fox – Alexandre Desplat; The Hurt Locker – Marco Beltrami and Buck Sanders; Sherlock Holmes – Hans Zimmer | **Best Music (Original Song)**: **"The Weary Kind (Theme from Crazy Heart)" from Crazy Heart – Music and Lyrics by Ryan Bingham and T Bone Burnett**‡; "Almost There" from The Princess and the Frog – Music and Lyrics by Randy Newman; "Down in New Orleans" from The Princess and the Frog – Music and Lyrics by Randy Newman; "Loin de Paname" from Paris 36 – Music by Reinhardt Wagner; Lyrics by Frank Thomas; "Take It All" from Nine – Music and Lyrics by Maury Yeston |
| **Best Sound Editing**: **The Hurt Locker – Paul N. J. Ottosson**‡; Avatar – Christopher Boyes and Gwendolyn Yates Whittle; Inglourious Basterds – Wylie Stateman; Star Trek – Mark Stoeckinger and Alan Rankin; Up – Michael Silvers and Tom Myers | **Best Sound Mixing**: **The Hurt Locker – Paul N. J. Ottosson and Ray Beckett**‡; Avatar – Christopher Boyes, Gary Summers, Andy Nelson and Tony Johnson; Inglourious Basterds – Michael Minkler, Tony Lamberti and Mark Ulano; Star Trek – Anna Behlmer, Andy Nelson and Peter J. Devlin; Transformers: Revenge of the Fallen – Greg P. Russell, Gary Summers and Geoffrey Patterson |
| **Best Art Direction**: **Avatar – Art Direction: Rick Carter and Robert Stromberg; Set Decoration: Kim Sinclair**‡; The Imaginarium of Doctor Parnassus – Art Direction: Dave Warren and Anastasia Masaro; Set Decoration: Caroline Smith; Nine – Art Direction: John Myhre; Set Decoration: Gordon Sim; Sherlock Holmes – Art Direction: Sarah Greenwood; Set Decoration: Katie Spencer; The Young Victoria – Art Direction: Patrice Vermette; Set Decoration: Maggie Gray | **Best Cinematography**: **Avatar – Mauro Fiore**‡; Harry Potter and the Half-Blood Prince – Bruno Delbonnel; The Hurt Locker – Barry Ackroyd; Inglourious Basterds – Robert Richardson; The White Ribbon – Christian Berger |
| **Best Makeup**: **Star Trek – Barney Burman, Mindy Hall and Joel Harlow**‡; Il Divo – Aldo Signoretti and Vittorio Sodano; The Young Victoria – Jon Henry Gordon and Jenny Shircore | **Best Costume Design**: **The Young Victoria – Sandy Powell**‡; Bright Star – Janet Patterson; Coco Before Chanel – Catherine Leterrier; The Imaginarium of Doctor Parnassus – Monique Prudhomme; Nine – Colleen Atwood |
| **Best Film Editing**: **The Hurt Locker – Bob Murawski and Chris Innis**‡; Avatar – Stephen E. Rivkin, John Refoua and James Cameron; District 9 – Julian Clarke; Inglourious Basterds – Sally Menke; Precious: Based on the Novel 'Push' by Sapphire – Joe Klotz | **Best Visual Effects**: **Avatar – Joe Letteri, Stephen Rosenbaum, Richard Baneham and Andrew R. Jones**‡; District 9 – Dan Kaufman, Peter Muyzers, Robert Habros and Matt Aitken; Star Trek – Roger Guyett, Russell Earl, Paul Kavanagh and Burt Dalton |

=== Governors Awards ===
The Academy held its 1st Annual Governors Awards ceremony on November 14, 2009, during which the following awards were presented:

==== Honorary Awards ====
- To Lauren Bacall in recognition of her central place in the golden age of motion pictures.
- To Roger Corman for his rich engendering of films and filmmakers.
- To Gordon Willis for unsurpassed mastery of light, shadow, color and motion.

==== Irving G. Thalberg Memorial Award ====
- John Calley

=== Films with multiple nominations and awards ===
The following 22 films received multiple nominations:

| Nominations | Film |
|---|---|
| 9 | Avatar |
| 9 | The Hurt Locker |
| 8 | Inglourious Basterds |
| 6 | Precious: Based on the Novel 'Push' by Sapphire |
| 6 | Up in the Air |
| 5 | Up |
| 4 | District 9 |
| 4 | Nine |
| 4 | Star Trek |
| 3 | An Education |
| 3 | Crazy Heart |
| 3 | The Princess and the Frog |
| 3 | The Young Victoria |
| 2 | The Blind Side |
| 2 | Fantastic Mr. Fox |
| 2 | Invictus |
| 2 | The Imaginarium of Doctor Parnassus |
| 2 | The Last Station |
| 2 | The Messenger |
| 2 | A Serious Man |
| 2 | Sherlock Holmes |
| 2 | The White Ribbon |

The following five films received multiple awards:

| Awards | Film |
|---|---|
| 6 | The Hurt Locker |
| 3 | Avatar |
| 2 | Crazy Heart |
| 2 | Precious: Based on the Novel 'Push' by Sapphire |
| 2 | Up |

== Presenters and performers ==
The following individuals, listed in order of appearance, presented awards or performed musical numbers.

=== Presenters ===
| Name(s) | Role |
|---|---|
| Gina Tuttle | Announcer for the 82nd annual Academy Awards |
| Penélope Cruz | Presenter of the award for Best Supporting Actor |
| Ryan Reynolds | Presenter of the film The Blind Side on the Best Picture segment |
| Steve Carell; Cameron Diaz | Presenters of the award for Best Animated Feature Film |
| Miley Cyrus; Amanda Seyfried | Presenters of the award for Best Original Song |
| Chris Pine | Presenter of the film District 9 on the Best Picture segment |
| Robert Downey Jr. Tina Fey | Presenters of the award for Best Original Screenplay |
| Matthew Broderick; Jon Cryer; Macaulay Culkin; Anthony Michael Hall; Judd Nelson; Molly Ringwald; Ally Sheedy | Presenters of the tribute to John Hughes |
| Samuel L. Jackson | Presenter of the film Up on the Best Picture segment |
| Carey Mulligan; Zoe Saldaña | Presenters of the awards for Best Animated Short Film, Best Documentary (Short Subject) and Best Live Action Short Film |
| Ben Stiller | Presenter of the award for Best Makeup |
| Jeff Bridges | Presenter of the film A Serious Man on the Best Picture segment |
| Jake Gyllenhaal; Rachel McAdams | Presenters of the award for Best Adapted Screenplay |
| Queen Latifah | Presenter of the segment of the Honorary Academy Awards and the Irving G. Thalberg Memorial Award |
| Robin Williams | Presenter of the award for Best Supporting Actress |
| Colin Firth | Presenter of the film An Education on the Best Picture segment |
| Sigourney Weaver | Presenter of the award for Best Art Direction |
| Tom Ford; Sarah Jessica Parker | Presenters of the award for Best Costume Design |
| Charlize Theron | Presenter of the film Precious on the Best Picture segment |
| Taylor Lautner; Kristen Stewart | Presenters of the horror films tribute montage |
| Zac Efron; Anna Kendrick | Presenters of the awards for Best Sound Editing and Best Sound Mixing |
| Elizabeth Banks | Presenter of the segment of the Academy Awards for Technical Achievement and the Gordon E. Sawyer Award |
| John Travolta | Presenter of the film Inglourious Basterds on the Best Picture segment |
| Sandra Bullock | Presenter of the award for Best Cinematography |
| Demi Moore | Presenter of "In Memoriam" tribute |
| Jennifer Lopez; Sam Worthington | Introducers of the special dance number to the tune of the Best Original Score nominees and presenters of the award for Best Original Score |
| Gerard Butler; Bradley Cooper | Presenters of the award for Best Visual Effects |
| Jason Bateman | Presenter of the film Up in the Air on the Best Picture segment |
| Matt Damon | Presenter of the award for Best Documentary Feature |
| Tyler Perry | Presenter of the award for Best Film Editing |
| Keanu Reeves | Presenter of the film The Hurt Locker on the Best Picture segment |
| Pedro Almodóvar; Quentin Tarantino | Presenters of the award for Best Foreign Language Film |
| Kathy Bates | Presenter of the film Avatar on the Best Picture segment |
| Vera Farmiga; Colin Farrell; Julianne Moore; Michelle Pfeiffer; Tim Robbins; Kate Winslet | Presenters of the award for Best Actor |
| Sean Penn; Peter Sarsgaard; Michael Sheen; Stanley Tucci; Forest Whitaker; Oprah Winfrey | Presenters of the award for Best Actress |
| Barbra Streisand | Presenter of the award for Best Director |
| Tom Hanks | Presenter of the award for Best Picture |

=== Performers ===
| Name(s) | Role | Performed |
|---|---|---|
| Marc Shaiman; Harold Wheeler | Musical arrangers | Orchestral |
| Neil Patrick Harris | Performer | Opening number |
| James Taylor | Performer | "In My Life" during the annual "In Memoriam" tribute |
| Legion of Extraordinary Dancers | Performers | Performed dance number synchronized with selections from Best Original Score nominees |

== Ceremony information ==
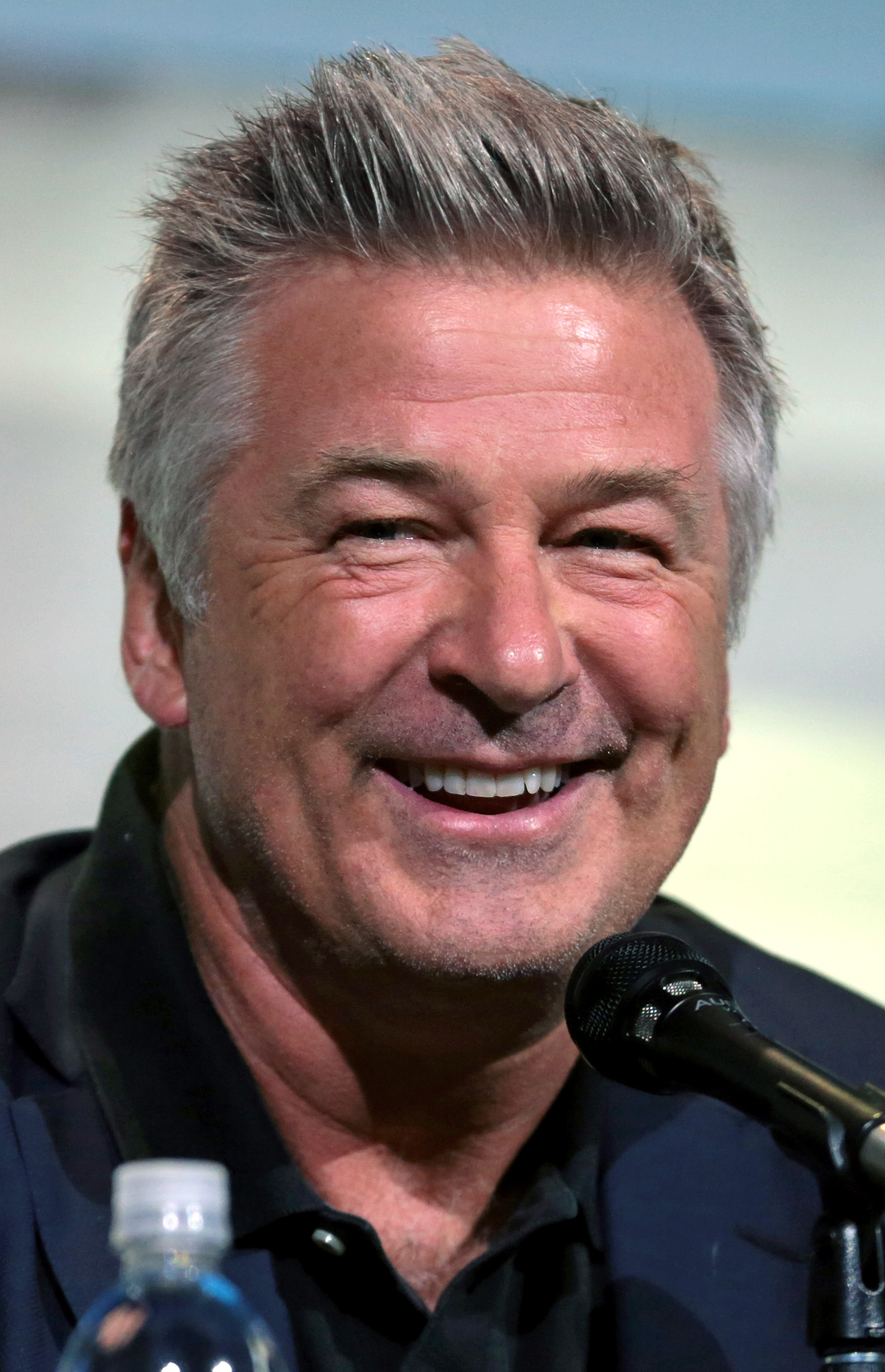
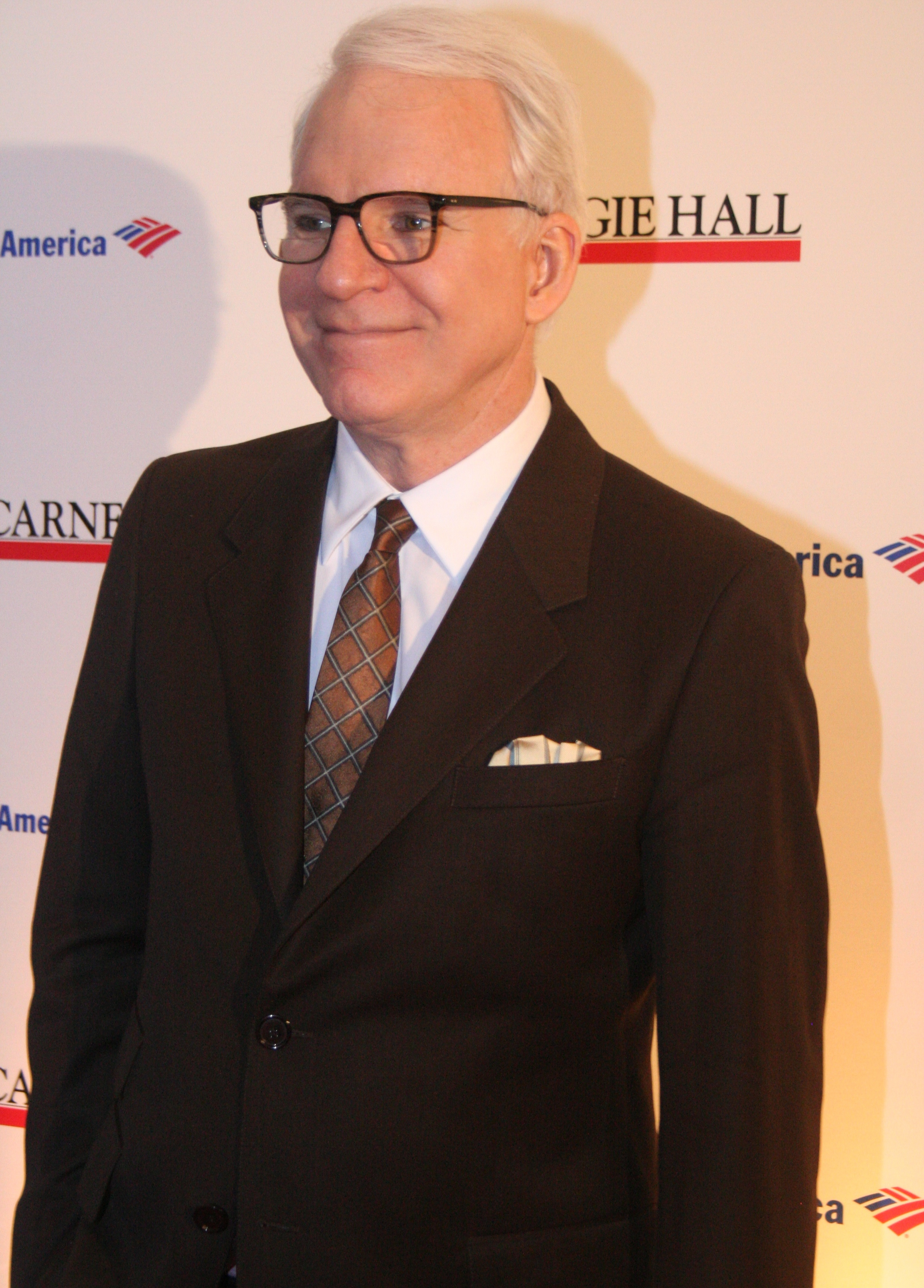
Alec Baldwin (left) and Steve Martin (right) co-hosted the 82nd Academy Awards.

Because of the declining viewership of recent Academy Awards ceremonies, the Academy sought ideas to revamp the show while renewing interest with the nominated films. After the previous year's telecast, which saw a 13% increase in viewership, many within the Motion Picture Academy proposed new ways to give the awards a more populist appeal. AMPAS then-president Sid Ganis announced that the ceremony would feature ten Best Picture nominees, rather than traditional five. The expansion was a throwback to the Academy's early years in the 1930s and 1940s, when eight to twelve films were nominated. "Having 10 Best Picture nominees is going to allow Academy voters to recognize and include some of the fantastic movies that often show up in the other Oscar categories, but have been squeezed out of the race for the top prize," Sid Ganis said in a press conference. "I can't wait to see what that list of ten looks like when the nominees are announced in February." Ganis also said that became difficult to get a clear winner. A cause of this was required a change in the voting system from first-past-the-post to alternative vote.

Choreographer Adam Shankman and Bill Mechanic were hired as producers for the ceremony. Shankman revealed in an interview on NPR's Fresh Air that he and Mechanic had originally chosen Sacha Baron Cohen as the host, but the Academy rejected this proposal because Baron Cohen was "too much of a wild card."

Many of the previous year's well-received elements returned. Five actors with a personal connection with each of the nominees presented the Best Actor and Best Actress awards. Shankman and Mechanic announced their intention to make the running time of the telecast shorter. Most presenters this year introduced each winner with the phrase "And the winner is ..." rather than "And the Oscar goes to..." for the first time since 1988. The Academy gave no reason for the change to a phrase which it had once felt humiliating to the other nominees; but apparently acquiesced in Shankman and Mechanic's decision to return to the older phrase. David Rockwell's proscenium curtain, decorated with 100,000 Swarovski crystals, was reused as part of the stage design for this year's telecast. Unlike most Oscar ceremonies, however, Mechanic and Shankman announced that none of the five songs nominated for Best Original Song would be performed live.

=== Box office performance of nominated films ===
For the first time since 2003, the field of major nominees included at least one blockbuster at the American and Canadian box offices. Five of the nominees had grossed over $100 million before the nominations were announced. Many critics, reporters, and entertainment industry analysts cite the AMPAS's decision to expand the roster of Best Picture nominees from five to ten films as one of the reasons for this.

Three of the ten Best Picture nominees were among the top ten releases in box office during the nominations. At the time of the announcement on February 2, Avatar was the highest-grossing film among the Best Picture nominees with $596 million in domestic box office receipts. Other top-ten domestic box office hits nominated were Up with $293 million, and The Blind Side with $237.9 million. Among the remaining seven nominees, Inglourious Basterds was the next highest-grossing film with $120.5 million followed by District 9 ($115.6 million), Up in the Air ($73 million), Precious: Based on the Novel 'Push' by Sapphire ($45 million), The Hurt Locker ($12 million), An Education ($9.4 million) and finally A Serious Man ($9.2 million).

Of the top 50 grossing films of the year, 46 nominations went to 13 films on the list. Only Avatar (1st), Up (5th), The Blind Side (8th), Inglourious Basterds (25th), District 9 (27th), The Princess and the Frog (32nd), Julie & Julia (34th), Coraline (42nd) and Up in the Air (43rd) were nominated for directing, acting, screenwriting, Best Picture or Animated Feature. The other top-50 box office hits that earned nominations were Harry Potter and the Half-Blood Prince (2nd), Transformers: Revenge of the Fallen (3rd), Star Trek (7th) and Sherlock Holmes (11th).

=== Oscar advertising and viewership issues ===
On March 1, 2010, WABC-TV New York, ABC's flagship station, announced that it would likely end its services with cable television company Cablevision on March 7, 2010, the weekend of the 82nd Academy Awards. The station was removed from Cablevision's lineup at 12:01 a.m. ET on March 7. Over 3.1 million viewers in the New York City viewing area, the nation's largest media market, would have been unable to watch the Oscars (and other station-related and ABC-related programming), and it was projected to cause a devastating blow to advertisers and viewership for the Oscars. At about 8:43 p.m. ET, thirteen minutes after the awards ceremony began, Cablevision resumed transmission of the WABC feed.

=== Music by Prudence acceptance speech ===
Shortly after Music by Prudence director Roger Ross Williams began his speech accepting the Oscar for Best Documentary Short Subject, he was suddenly interrupted by Elinor Burkett, his co-producer. The scene was described as the ceremony's weirdest or most awkward moment, and was compared by Williams and others to Kanye West's interruption of Taylor Swift's acceptance of the Best Female Video Award at the 2009 MTV Video Music Awards five months earlier.

Burkett, who lives in Zimbabwe where most of the film was shot, had sued Williams over the finished film, a suit that had been settled by the time of the ceremony. She explained to Salon.com, to which she was once a contributor, that the film had been her idea. "Roger had never even heard of Zimbabwe before I told him about this." She had been upset that Williams and HBO chose to focus on one person instead of the entire band, as the members had been led to believe. "I felt my role in this has been denigrated again and again, and it wasn't going to happen this time." She hustled onstage because, she claimed, Williams' mother had blocked her from going down with her cane to prevent her from sharing the stage.

"She just ambushed me", said Williams, "I just expected her to stand there. I had a speech prepared." He said it was made clear by the Academy that only one person can give an acceptance speech. He said his mother had merely gotten up to hug him.

=== Critical reviews ===
The show received a mixed reception from media publications. Some media outlets were more critical of the show. Film critic Roger Ebert criticized the opening monologue of Baldwin and Martin saying it was "surprisingly unfunny". He later went on to say that there was joy that The Hurt Locker won, but choice of Baldwin and Martin as host was wrong. Los Angeles Times columnist Mary McNamara quipped that the show had no sense of timing saying, "Despite everyone's best efforts, this year's Oscars seemed to suffer from a crisis of confidence." Time television critic James Poniewozik also criticized "the choppy paced" ceremony stating, it was "a classic Oscar failing". He also noted that having two hosts was a disadvantage.

Other media outlets received the broadcast more positively. The Boston Globe television critic Matthew Gilbert lauded the hosts performance saying that "The delivery was expert and warmly conversational, like one of those old-school comedy teams." Hank Stuever of The Washington Post remarked that the telecast "moved along with precision and smart decisions." He also praised Baldwin and Martin writing that they "proved to be classy and quippy throughout the night." Maureen Ryan of the Chicago Tribune gave an average critique of the ceremony but acclaimed the cast.

=== Ratings and reception ===
The American telecast on ABC drew in an average of 41.62 million people over its length, which was a 13% increase from the previous year's ceremony. An estimated 79.68 million total viewers watched all or part of the awards. The show also drew higher Nielsen ratings compared to the two previous ceremonies with 24.89% of households watching over a 36.69 share. In addition, the program scored a higher 18-49 demo rating with a 12.71 rating over a 31.51 share among viewers in that demographic. It was the highest viewership for an Academy Award telecast since the 77th ceremony held in 2005.

In July 2010, the ceremony presentation received 12 nominations at the 62nd Primetime Emmys. The following month, the ceremony won one of those nominations for Outstanding Art Direction for Variety, Music or Nonfiction Programming (David Rockwell and Joe Celli).

== "In Memoriam" ==
The annual "In Memoriam" tribute, produced by Chuck Workman, was presented by actress Demi Moore. Singer James Taylor performed The Beatles' song "In My Life" during the tribute.

- Patrick Swayze – Actor
- Maurice Jarre – Composer
- Monte Hale – Actor
- Jean Simmons – Actress
- Tullio Pinelli – Writer
- Éric Rohmer – Director
- Ken Annakin – Director
- David Carradine – Actor
- Gareth Wigan – Executive
- Daniel Melnick – Producer
- Howard Zieff – Director
- Dom DeLuise – Actor
- Army Archerd – Journalist
- Ron Silver – Actor
- Brittany Murphy – Actress
- Lou Jacobi – Actor
- Simon Channing Williams – Producer
- Betsy Blair – Actress
- Joseph Wiseman – Actor
- Jack Cardiff – Cinematographer
- Kathryn Grayson – Actress
- Arthur Canton – Public relations
- Nat Boxer – Sound
- Millard Kaufman – Writer
- Roy E. Disney – Executive
- Larry Gelbart – Writer
- Horton Foote – Writer
- Robert Woodruff Anderson – Writer
- Budd Schulberg – Writer
- Michael Jackson – Musician
- Natasha Richardson – Actress
- Jennifer Jones – Actress
- David Brown – Producer
- Karl Malden – Actor

A separate tribute was held earlier in the evening for filmmaker John Hughes, presented by actors Matthew Broderick, Molly Ringwald, Judd Nelson, Ally Sheedy, Anthony Michael Hall, Macaulay Culkin and Jon Cryer. The 77th telecast had previously featured a special memorial to Johnny Carson presented by Chris Rock and Whoopi Goldberg.

== See also ==
- 67th Golden Globe Awards
- 16th Screen Actors Guild Awards
- 30th Golden Raspberry Awards
- 52nd Grammy Awards
- 62nd Primetime Emmy Awards
- 63rd British Academy Film Awards
- 64th Tony Awards
- List of submissions to the 82nd Academy Awards for Best Foreign Language Film
