= Cinema Italiano =

Song written by Maury Yeston

"Cinema Italiano" is one of three original songs written for the 2009 film Nine, an adaption of the 1982 musical of the same name. It is sung by Kate Hudson's character, and written by Maury Yeston who penned all the songs from the musical. It was nominated for Best Original Song for both a Golden Globe and Critic's Choice Award.

== Conception ==
Incontention.com stated: "Hudson's Vogue journalist Stephanie was expanded considerably for the film", and the song was written for the part. She is an "avid fan of Guido Contini's movies – but for all the wrong reasons. She loves the style over the content." Maury Yeston described the motivation behind the character, and the purpose of the song within the context of the film:

"Cinema Italiano" defines the character that Kate Hudson plays. She is a particularly shallow commentator. She's not even a film critic, she's actually a fashion writer for Vogue. She's sort of ditzy, and she's throwing around film terms that she doesn't really understand and sees film in its most superficial aspects. Which is the very last thing this director needs to hear, and it becomes a turning point in the film. Because that's when he realizes that people often admire him for the wrong reason. And for the very first time he doesn't sleep with a woman, and he runs back to his wife. The other function of the song is to familiarize some of the younger audience members with the fact that there was a thing called the "New Wave" of "Italian art films" that really was sweeping the world.

== Production ==
Producer and choreographer John DeLuca explained the song's production:

As a backdrop for Kate's "Cinema Italiano" musical sequence, director Rob Marshall and I wanted to convey the spirit and excitement of the exploding era of the '60s as models strut their stuff on the catwalk. The number starts with the rhythm of a drumbeat and escalates as Stephanie seduces Guido with her charm.

Reality and fantasy collide. The juxtaposition of these two worlds is the interesting and necessary spin for the number. The scene and the song intertwine, and what starts as a celebration ends up as a nightmare for Guido. He desperately needs to make a profound change in a deceitful life of lies and excess.

To conceive of an energetic '60s dance number for a true singer and dancer like Kate Hudson was pure joy. The discipline of dancers is sublime and we saw that Kate had it in her blood. We were hard on her, but she knew we wanted her to be the best she could be. She worked and worked and worked and never gave in to the strict demands of the number.

It was exhilarating imagining the driving beat and infectious energy of the '60s choreography for "Cinema Italiano" to help illustrate a dramatic turning point in Guido's life. The number found its way into the framework of the film only when the concept of the fantasy nightmare paid off in reality. Guido is slowly losing control of his fantasies. They, in turn, enlighten his predicament and begin to spotlight the dichotomy of Guido's psyche that leaves him trapped. He will have two choices -- self destruction or a requisite change.

== Synopsis ==
Incontention explains: "Her song kicks in during an attempt at seducing Daniel Day-Lewis's crisis-stricken filmmaker Guido Contini and is meant to reflect the flashbulb-popping chic and panache of the entertainment industry, and certainly, Stephanie's place in that shallow world."

== Critical reception ==
Some reviewers did not understand that the song was a critique of how many magazine writers write about the topics they know nothing about, and instead pinned the character's inaccurate and stereotypical description of Italian cinema on the songwriter. For example, one critic wrote "it's obvious, from the lyrics, that the song's writer knows very little about Italian cinema.". Incontention wrote "I would say it stands out as the most catching tune of the piece, but it's also the most out of place and has some fairly trite lyrics (and some odd rhythm shifts)". ReelViews wrote ""Cinema Italiano," is enjoyable; it just doesn't seem to belong. And Guido's near-dalliance with her occurs at a critical point during his marital strife when it is unlikely he would be interested in pursuing any woman other than Luisa. Stephanie disappears from the movie after this, to reappear only when everyone gathers for a fantasy sequence near the end. " PopSugar said " I've had Kate Hudson singing "Cinema Italiano" stuck in my head ever since I caught a sneak preview of Nine. "
