= Roger Ross Williams =

American film director (born 1962)

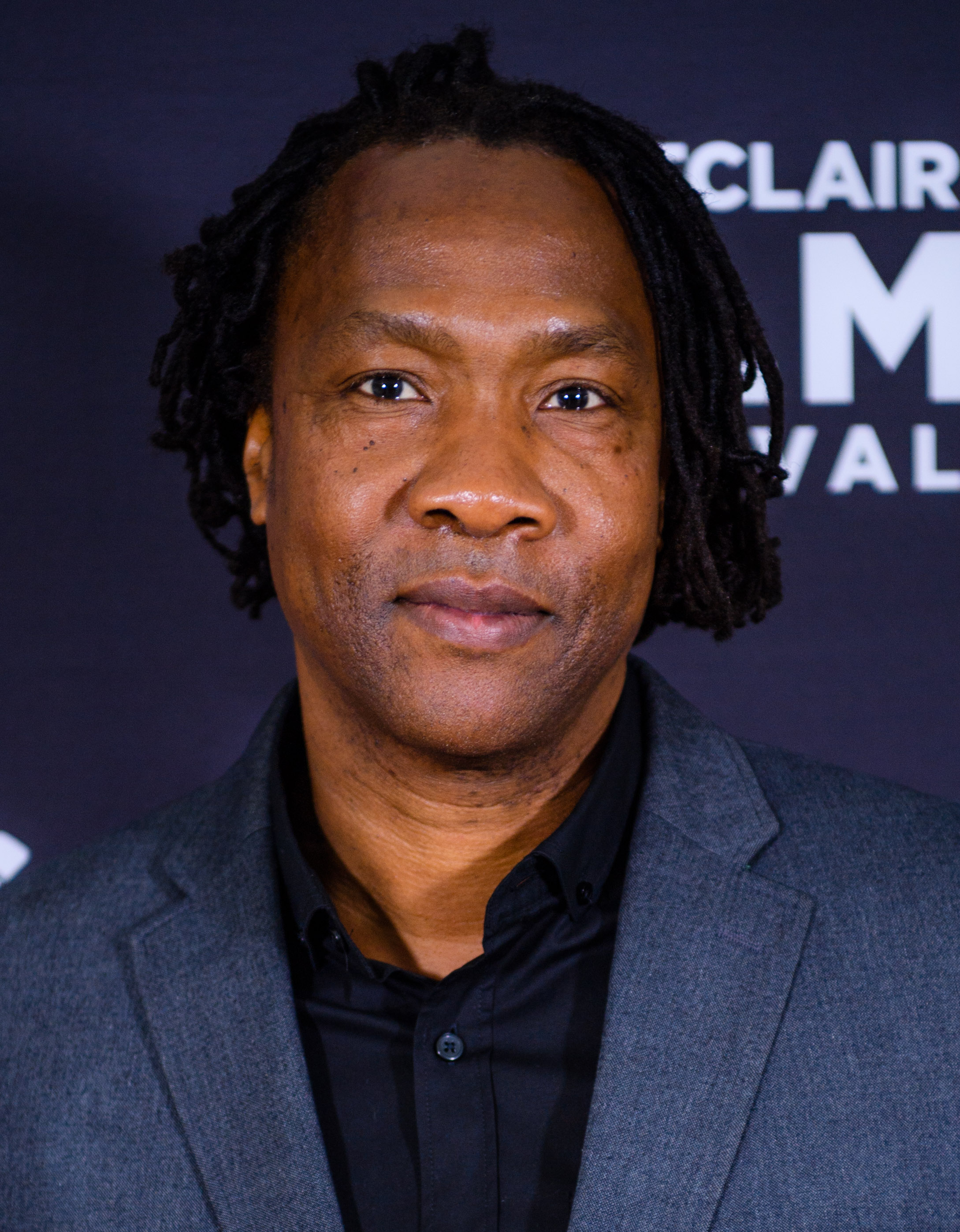
- Williams in April 2016
- Born: September 16, 1962 (age 64); Easton, Pennsylvania, U.S.
- Occupations: Film director Screenwriter; Film producer
- Years active: 1995–present

Roger Ross Williams (born September 16, 1962) is an American director, producer and writer and the first African American director to win an Academy Award (Oscar), with his short film Music by Prudence; this film won the Academy Award for Best Documentary Short Film in 2009.

== Early life and education ==
Williams was born September 16, 1962, in Easton, Pennsylvania, in the Lehigh Valley region of eastern Pennsylvania. He is a member of a Gullah family from South Carolina. Williams attended Easton Area High School and then Northampton Community College in Bethlehem, Pennsylvania and New York University in New York City.

== Career ==
Williams began his career in 1985, producing political satire for Comedy Central and Michael Moore's Emmy Award-winning series TV Nation. He has since produced and directed for NBC News, MSNBC, BBC, CNN and has produced work for Comedy Central, Food Network, TLC, VH1, including numerous primetime specials for Public Broadcasting Service (PBS), American Broadcasting Company (ABC) and ABC News, CBS, Sundance Channel and New York Times Television. He has also produced a documentary series for Discovery Networks and a lifestyle series, Sheila Bridges Designer Living, for Scripps Networks. He has won numerous awards for his TV work including a NAMIC Vision Award and the National Headliner for Best Human Interest Feature documentary.

Williams has directed a number of films including Life, Animated, which won the Sundance Film Festival Directing Award, was nominated for an Academy Award for Best Documentary Feature Film and won three Emmy Awards in 2018, including the award for Best Documentary. The film God Loves Uganda that he directed, which was shortlisted for an Academy Award for Best Documentary Feature Film and American Jail, examined the U.S. prison system and premiered on CNN and the BBC. Williams directed Traveling While Black, a virtual reality documentary / transmedia project made for Facebook's Oculus, which premiered at the Sundance Film Festival in 2019. His 2019 film The Apollo, a documentary about Harlem's legendary Apollo Theater, was the opening night film of the 2019 Tribeca Film Festival.

His first narrative feature film, Cassandro, was released by Amazon Studios in 2023. His production company, One Story Up, which he co-founded with Geoff Martz, has produced a variety of documentary projects. In 2020, they executive produced the Between The World and Me special for HBO, based on the eponymous book by Ta-Nehisi Coates. The following year, they produced High On The Hog: How African American Cuisine Transformed America for Netflix, with Williams directing. The series won a 2021 Peabody Award. In 2023, the company released several projects including Stamped From The Beginning (nominated for a 2024 Primetime Emmy for Exceptional Merit In Documentary Filmmaking 2024), The Super Models, The 1619 Project (winner of the 2023 Primetime Emmy for Outstanding Documentary Or Nonfiction Series), and Love To Love You, Donna Summer.

The documentary film Master of Light, directed by Rosa Ruth Boesten and produced by Ilja Roomans, Anousha Nzume and Williams, was played at the music and film festival South by Southwest (SXSW) in March 2022. It is a production of One Story Up and the Dutch documentary collective 'Docmakers'. It is a film about the artist George Anthony Morton. The film was included in HBO Max that same year.

Williams is the first African American director to win an Academy Award with his short film Music by Prudence; this film won the Academy Award for Best Documentary Short Film in 2009.

Williams serves on the board of Docubox Kenya, a documentary fund and mentorship program based in Nairobi that supports African filmmakers. Williams serves on the alumni advisor board of None On Record, the alumni advisory board of the Sundance Institute, and, since 2016, the Board of Governors for the Academy of Motion Pictures Arts and Sciences, serving as chair of the Documentary Branch and the Documentary Diversity Committee. He is also a trustee of the Zeitz Museum of Contemporary Art Africa, the first major museum in Africa dedicated to contemporary art. Furthermore, he is a member of the Advisory Board of Full Frame Documentary Film Festival, and of the board of the Tribeca Film Institute.

== Filmography ==
=== Director ===
- 1997: Discovered At Sundance (TV)
- 2000: Reagan: A Life In Pictures (TV)
- 2001: Time (TV)
- 2001: Challenge America With Erin Brockovich (TV)
- 2002: Secret Son (TV)
- 2003: Power, Privilege & Justice (TV)
- 2003: Boys Will Be Girls (TV)
- 2003: First Off The Tee (TV)
- 2003: New York Underground (TV)
- 2004: The Lives They Lived (TV)
- 2004: Moroccan Style (TV)
- 2005: Sheila Bridges Designer Living: Morocco Special (TV) and Sheila Bridges Designer Living
- 2006: Amazing Families (TV)
- 2010: Undercover Boss (TV, 1 episode: 7-Eleven)
- 2010: Music by Prudence
- 2013: God Loves Uganda
- 2014: Tutu: The Essence of Being Human
- 2015: Gospel of Intolerance
- 2015: Blackface
- 2016: Life, Animated
- 2018: American Jail
- 2019: The Apollo
- 2020: The Innocence Files
- 2021: High On The Hog: How African American Cuisine Transformed America
- 2023: Cassandro
- 2023: The 1619 Project
- 2023: Love to Love You, Donna Summer
- 2023: The Super Models (TV)
- 2023: Stamped from the Beginning

=== Producer ===
- 1995: People Yearbook '95 (TV) (segment producer)
- 1996: Sex, Drugs and Consequences (TV) (producer)
- 1997: TV Nation: Volume One (segment producer)
- 2000: Reagan: A Life In Pictures (TV) (producer)
- 2001: Time (TV) (producer)
- 2002: Secret Son (TV) (producer)
- 2002: Life 360 (segment producer) (1 episode:Telling the Children) (segment producer)
- 2003: Power, Privilege & Justice (TV) (producer)
- 2003: First Off The Tee (TV) (producer)
- 2003: New York Underground (TV) (producer)
- 2004: The Lives They Lived (TV) (producer)
- 2004: Moroccan Style (TV) (producer)
- 2004 - 2005: Sheila Bridges Designer Living (series supervising producer)
- 2006: Amazing Families (TV) (producer)
- 2007: Alone No Love (co-producer)
- 2007: Yearbook (TV) (series producer)
- 2010: Music by Prudence (producer)
- 2013: God Loves Uganda (producer)
- 2014: Tutu: The Essence of Being Human (producer)
- 2016: Life, Animated
- 2020: The Innocence Files (executive producer)
- 2020: Between The World and Me (executive producer)
- 2021: High On The Hog: How African American Cuisine Transformed America (executive producer)
- 2022: Master of Light (producer)
- 2023: Savior Complex
- 2023: The 1619 Project (executive producer)
- 2023: Love to Love You, Donna Summer (producer)
- 2024: The Battle For Laikipia (executive producer)
- 2025: Move Ya Body: The Birth of House (executive producer)
- 2025: How to Build a Library (executive producer)

=== Screenwriter ===
- 2000: Reagan: A Life In Pictures (TV)
- 2003: Power, Privilege & Justice (TV)
- 2003: First Off The Tee (TV)
- 2003: New York Underground (TV)
- 2004: The Lives They Lived (TV)
- 2004: Moroccan Style (TV)
- 2005: Sheila Bridges Designer Living: Morocco Special (TV)
- 2006: Amazing Families (TV)
- 2023: Cassandro co-written with David Teague

== Awards ==
- NAMIC Vision Award for the television special Moroccan Style
- The National Headliner for Best Human Interest Feature for his documentary New York Underground
- Academy Award for Best Documentary (Short Subject) for Music by Prudence in 2010.
- Primetime Emmy Award for Outstanding Documentary Or Nonfiction Series for The 1619 Project
- Primetime Emmy Award for Outstanding Documentary or Nonfiction Special for The Apollo
- News & Documentary Emmy Award for Outstanding Arts and Culture Documentary for Life, Animated
- News & Documentary Emmy Award for Best Documentary for Life, Animated
- Peabody Award for High On The Hog: How African American Cuisine Transformed America
- Inspiration Award, Full Frame Documentary Film Festival for God Loves Uganda
- Best Feature Documentary, Ashland Independent Film Festival for God Loves Uganda
- Best Feature Documentary Dallas International Film Festival for God Loves Uganda
- Directing Award: U.S. Documentary Sundance Film Festival for Life, Animated
