= Kristin Chenoweth credits =

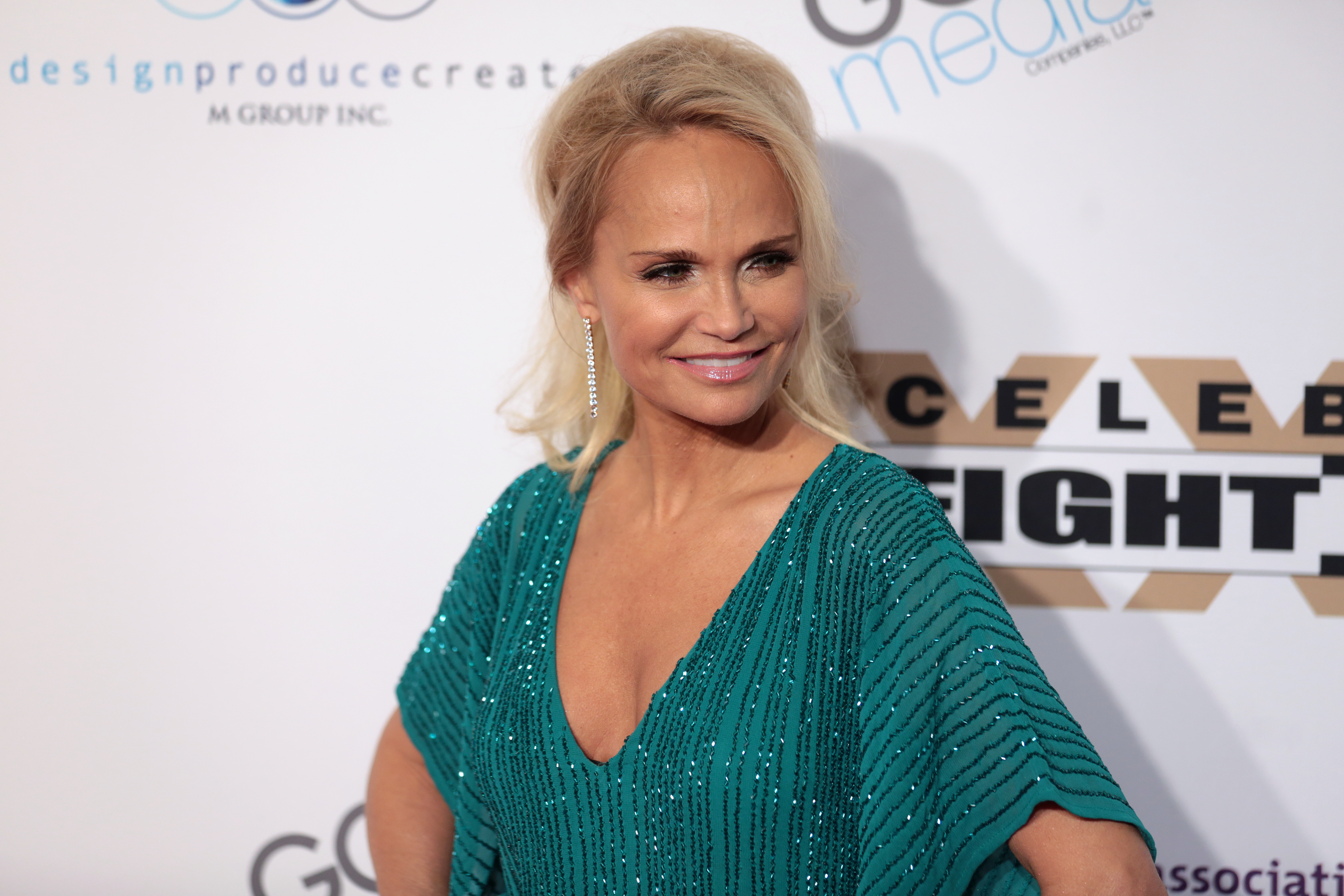
Kristin Chenoweth in 2018

This is a list of Kristin Chenoweth's filmography, concert appearances, books and theatre credits.

== Theatre ==
=== Broadway ===
Year	Show	Role	Notes
1997	Steel Pier	Precious McGuire	Richard Rodgers Theatre; April 24, 1997 – June 28, 1997
1999	You're a Good Man, Charlie Brown	Sally Brown	Ambassador Theatre; February 4, 1999 – June 13, 1999
1999	Epic Proportions	Louise Goldman	Helen Hayes Theatre; September 7, 1999 – December 19, 1999
2003	Wicked	Glinda the Good Witch	George Gershwin Theatre; October 8, 2003 – July 18, 2004
2006	The Apple Tree	Eve, Princess Barbára, Ella & Passionella	Studio 54; December 14, 2006 – March 11, 2007
2010	Promises, Promises	Fran Kubelik	The Broadway Theatre; March 28, 2010 – January 2, 2011
2015	On the Twentieth Century	Lily Garland	American Airlines Theatre; February 12, 2015 – July 19, 2015
2016	My Love Letter to Broadway	Herself	Lunt-Fontanne Theatre; November 2, 2016 – November 13, 2016
2019	Kristin Chenoweth: For the Girls	Herself	Nederlander Theatre; November 8, 2019 – November 17, 2019
2023	Gutenberg! The Musical!	The Producer	James Earl Jones Theatre; November 29, 2023 (guest cameo)
2025	The Queen of Versailles	Jackie Siegel	St. James Theatre; October 8, 2025 - December 21, 2025

=== Other ===
Year	Title	Role	Venue
1991	The King and I	Tuptim	Music Theatre Wichita, Wichita, KS
1993	Animal Crackers	Arabella Rittenhouse	Paper Mill Playhouse, Millburn, NJ
1994	Box Office of the Damned	Kristy	Classic Stage Company, Off-Broadway
1994	Dames at Sea	Ruby	Harold Clurman Theater, Off-Broadway
1994	Phantom	Christine Daaé	North Shore Music Theatre, Beverly, MA
1995	Phantom	Christine Daaé	German tour
1995	Strike Up the Band	Anne Draper	Goodspeed Opera House, East Haddam, CT
1995	The Fantasticks	Luisa	Sullivan Street Playhouse, Off-Broadway
1997	Scapin	Hyacinth	Laura Pels Theatre, Off-Broadway
1998	A New Brain	Nancy D/Waitress	Mitzi E. Newhouse Theater, Off-Broadway
1998	You're A Good Man Charlie Brown	Sally Brown	National Tour
2002	Strike Up the Band	Anne Draper	Goodspeed Opera House, East Haddam, CT
2003	Wicked	Glinda	Curran Theatre, San Francisco
2009	Love, Loss, and What I Wore	N/A	Westside Theatre, Off-Broadway
2024	The Queen of Versailles	Jackie Siegel	Emerson Colonial Theatre, Boston

==== NYC Center Encores! ====
Year	Title	Role
1998	Strike Up the Band	Anne Draper
2000	On a Clear Day You Can See Forever	Daisy Gamble/Melinda
2005	The Apple Tree	Eve, Princess Barbára, Ella/Passionella
2007	Stairway to Paradise	Female Star
2009	Music in the Air	Frieda Hatzfeld

=== Workshops ===
- Zombie Prom, Toffee
- Thoroughly Modern Millie, Millie Dilmount
- Young Frankenstein, Elizabeth
- Soapdish, Celeste Talbert
- Tammy Faye Bakker: The Musical, Tammy Faye Bakker

== Film ==
Year	Title	Role	Notes
2002	Topa Topa Bluffs	Patty	
2005	Bewitched	Maria Kelly	
2006	The Pink Panther	Cherie	
2006	RV	Mary Jo Gornicke	
2006	Running with Scissors	Fern Stewart	
2006	Stranger than Fiction	Book Channel host	
2006	Deck the Halls	Tia Hall	
2006	A Sesame Street Christmas Carol	Christmas Carol	Voice
2008	Space Chimps	Kilowatt	Voice
2008	Tinker Bell	Rosetta	Voice
2008	Four Christmases	Courtney	
2009	Into Temptation	Linda Salerno	
2009	Tinker Bell and the Lost Treasure	Rosetta	Voice
2010	Tinker Bell and the Great Fairy Rescue	Rosetta	Voice
2010	You Again	Georgia King	
2012	Hit and Run	Debby Kreeger	
2013	Family Weekend	Samantha Smith-Dungy	
2014	The Opposite Sex	Mrs. Kemp	
2014	Rio 2	Gabi	Voice
2015	Strange Magic	Sugar Plum Fairy	Voice
2015	The Boy Next Door	Vicky Lansing	
2015	The Peanuts Movie	Fifi	Voice
2015	Twinsters	N/A	Associate producer
2016	Hard Sell	Lorna Buchanan	
2017	Class Rank	Janet Krauss	
2017	My Little Pony: The Movie	Princess Skystar	Voice
2017	The Star	Abby	Voice
2020	The Witches	Daisy, Mary	Voice
2020	Holidate	Aunt Susan	
2021	National Champions	Bailey Lazor	
2022	Bros	Herself	
2024	Wicked	Wiz-O-Mania Super Star	Cameo
2024	Our Little Secret	Erica	

== Television ==
Key
†	Denotes television productions that have not yet been released

Year	Title	Role	Notes
1999	Annie	Lily St. Regis	Television film
1999	LateLine	Kristin	Episode: "The Christian Guy"
1999	Paramour	Unknown	Miniseries
2001	Seven Roses	Unknown	Television film
2001	Kristin	Kristin Yancey	13 episodes (7 unaired)
2001	Frasier	Portia Sanders	Episode: "Junior Agent"
2002	Baby Bob	Crystal Carter	Episode: "Talking Babies Say the Darndest Things"
2003	The Music Man	Marian Paroo	Television film
2003	Fillmore!	Museum Guide	Voice, episode: "Masterstroke of Malevolence"
2005	Great Performances	Cunegonde	Episode: "Leonard Bernstein's Candide"
2004–2006	The West Wing	Annabeth Schott	34 episodes
2003, 2006	Sesame Street	Ms. Noodle	2 episodes
2001, 2007	Elmo's World	Ms. Noodle	2 episodes
2007	Ugly Betty	Diane	Episode: "East Side Story"
2007	52nd Drama Desk Awards	Host	Special
2007, 2018	Robot Chicken	Various voices	Voice, 2 episodes
2007–2009	Pushing Daisies	Olive Snook	Main cast
2009	Twelve Men of Christmas	E. J. Baxter	Lifetime movie
2009	Sit Down, Shut Up	Miracle Grohe	Voice, 13 episodes
2009–2011, 2014	Glee	April Rhodes	5 episodes
2010	Kathy Griffin: My Life on the D-List	Herself	1 episode, "Maggie, the Musical"
2012	GCB	Carlene Cockburn	10 episodes
2012	Hot in Cleveland	Courtney Price	Episode: "The Gateway Friend"
2012	The Good Wife	Peggy Byrne	2 episodes
2013	Say Yes to the Dress	Herself	1 episode "Sisters Know Best"
2013–2014	Kirstie	Brittany Gold	2 episodes
2014–2019	BoJack Horseman	Vanessa Gekko, Mrs. Teach-Bot	Voice, 5 episodes
2015	American Dad!	Devin	Voice, episode: "LGBSteve"
2015	69th Tony Awards	Host	Special
2015	Descendants	Maleficent	Disney Channel Original Movie
2015	The Muppets	Herself	Episode: "The Ex-Factor"
2016	Hairspray Live!	Velma Von Tussle	Special
2017	American Gods	Easter	Episode: "Come to Jesus"
2017	Younger	Marylynne Keller	Episode: "Post Truth"
2018	Mom	Miranda	Episode: "Charlotte Brontë and a Backhoe"
2018	RuPaul's Drag Race: All Stars	Herself/Guest judge	Episode: Season 3, All Stars Snatch Game, episode 4
2018	Trial & Error	Lavinia Peck-Foster	Main cast (season 2)
2018	A Very Wicked Halloween	Glinda/Herself	Special: co-host and performer
2019	A Christmas Love Story	Katherine Clark	Television film; also executive producer
2019	Harvey Girls Forever!	Patty Pupé	Voice, episode: "The Puppets Take Meanhattan"
2020	The Disney Family Singalong	Warm Up Host	Sing Along Special
2020	Candy Land	Host	6 episodes
2021–2023	Schmigadoon!	Mildred Layton/Miss Codwell	Main cast
2021	The Voice	Herself	Advisor to Team Ariana
2021	Let's Make a Deal	Herself	2 episodes
2022	Keeper of the Ashes: The Oklahoma Girl Scout Murders	Herself	4 episodes
2025–2026	Stumble	Tammy Istiny	
2027	The Traitors †	Contestant	Season 6

== Concerts ==
Tours

- Kristin Chenoweth in Concert: May 9, 2012 – Dec. 10, 2012 (27 shows)
- Coming Home Tour: Aug. 8, 2015 – October 9, 2016 (68 shows; 25 in 2015, 43 in 2016)
- Kristin Chenoweth: Live on Tour: January 21 – May 20, 2017 (25 shows)

Other Concerts

- Sep. 10, 2004 – Carnegie Hall
- Jan. 19, 2007 – Metropolitan Opera House
- Jan. 10, 2009 – Fabulous Fox Theatre
- Feb. 23, 2009 – Ralph Freud Playhouse
- May 11, 2009 – New York City Center
- Oct. 24, 2009 – Scottsdale Performing Arts
- Dec. 15/17, 2009 – Beacon Theatre
- May 1/2 & Oct. 15/16, 2010 – Civic Center Music Hall
- Dec. 31, 2010 – Walt Disney Concert Hall
- Sep. 17, 2011 – Grand Ole Opry
- Aug. 23/24, 2013 – Hollywood Bowl
- Oct. 5, 2013 – Saenger Theatre
- Dec. 31, 2013 – Smith Center
- Feb. 5, 2014 – American Music Theatre
- Feb. 7, 2014 – Long Island University
- Feb. 9, 2014 – Proctor's Theatre
- Feb. 12, 2014 – The Kentucky Center
- Feb. 15, 2014 – Majestic Theatre
- May 3, 2014 – Carnegie Hall
- Jul. 12, 2014 – Royal Albert Hall
- Mar. 18, 2015 – Civic Center Music Hall
- Jun. 29, 2015 – Voice for the Voiceless #Stars4FosterKids at the St. James Theatre
- Oct. 20, 2017 – London Palladium
- Oct. 11, 2026 - Grand Ole Opry

== Books ==
- A Little Bit Wicked: Life, Love, and Faith in Stages (2009)
- What Will I Do With My Love Today (2022)
- My Moment (2022)
- I'm No Philosopher, But I Got Thoughts (2023)

== Albums ==
- Let Yourself Go (2001)
- As I Am (2005)
- A Lovely Way to Spend Christmas (2008)
- Some Lessons Learned (2011)
- Coming Home (2014)
- The Art of Elegance (2016)
- For the Girls (2019)
- Happiness Is...Christmas! (2021)
