= Tyler Hanes =

American actor

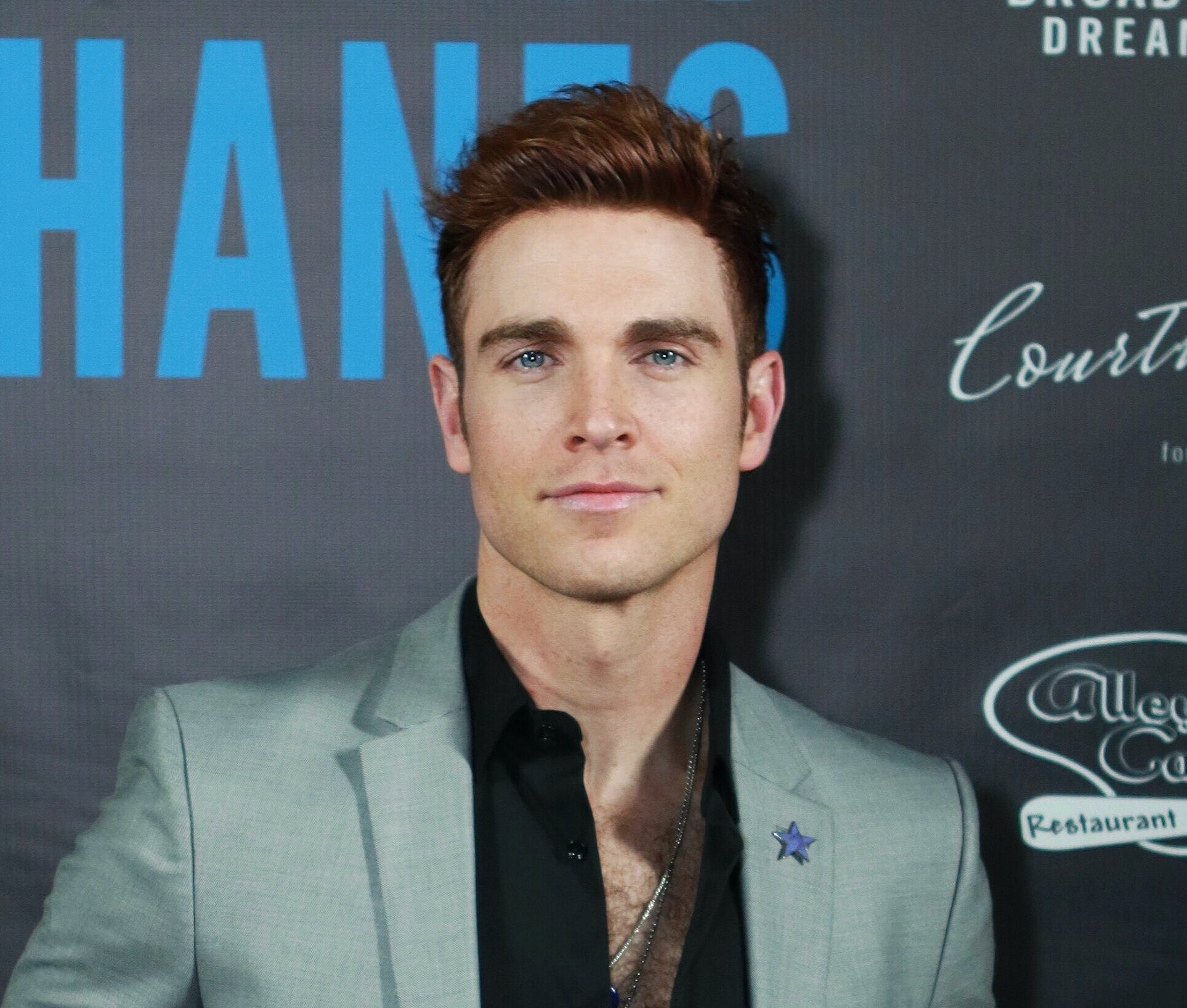
- Born: October 12, 1982 (age 42); Jacksonville, Florida, U.S.
- Education: Pebblebrook High School
- Alma mater: Carnegie Mellon University
- Occupations: Actor; Choreographer
- Years active: 2000–present
- Partner: Van Hansis (2007–present)
- Website: tylerhanes.net

Tyler Jonathan Hanes (born October 12, 1982) is an American actor, singer, dancer and choreographer best known for his work in Broadway musicals.

== Early life ==
Hanes was born in Jacksonville, Florida and was raised in Marietta, Georgia. The fifth of seven children, Tyler was raised by his mother, Bonnie Hanes. He started dancing at the age of seven after following the influence of his sisters. He attended Pebblebrook High School, The Cobb County Center for the Performing Arts, as well as Carnegie Mellon School of Drama.

== Career ==
Hanes was discovered by Ann Reinking while attending Broadway Theater Project in Tampa, Florida. She cast him in the first national tour of the Tony Award-winning musical, Fosse. He left the tour to attend Carnegie Mellon University but left after a year to make his Broadway debut in the 2002 Broadway revival of Oklahoma! Soon after, he appeared in the original Broadway companies of Urban Cowboy, The Boy From Oz, The Frogs, Sweet Charity, and as Larry in the original revival company of A Chorus Line. Hanes also appeared in the Broadway companies of Hairspray and On the Town. Off-Broadway, Tyler has starred in the musical Juno, and Stephen Sondheim's A Bed And A Chair: A NY Love Affair. Tyler starred as Rum Tum Tugger in the Broadway Revival of Cats.

He recurred as Jerry Orbach on Fosse/Verdon on FX. Hanes is also one of the stars and producers of the web series "Ms. Guidance".

As a choreographer, his work includes Dancing with the Stars, Kristin Chenoweth's Some Lessons Learned World Tour, the Latin American premiere of El Chico De Oz in Lima, Peru, and Kristin Chenoweth: For The Girls on Broadway.

== Personal life ==
Hanes is gay and has been in a relationship with fellow actor Van Hansis since 2007.
