= Kristin Chenoweth: For the Girls =

2019 concerts starring Kristin Chenoweth

- Playbill cover
- Music: various
- Lyrics: various
- Book: Kristin Chenoweth
- Basis: For The Girls by Kristin Chenoweth
- Premiere: November 8, 2019: The Nederlander Theater
- Productions: 2019 Broadway

Kristin Chenoweth: For the Girls is the second musical revue-style concert written for and starring American singer and actress Kristin Chenoweth. The show was intended to promote Chenoweth's sixth studio album, For the Girls, which celebrates the music of some iconic female entertainers. The show was directed by Richard Jay-Alexander, with musical direction by Mary Mitchell Campbell, and produced by James L. Nederlander following the success of her first Broadway residency concert, My Love Letter to Broadway. The show was a limited engagement of 8 performances at Broadway's Nederlander Theatre from November 8 through 17, 2019.

== Background ==
On August 8, 2019, Chenoweth announced that she would release her seventh solo album For the Girls, paying tribute to female entertainers that she idolized from Dolly Parton, to Barbra Streisand, to Judy Garland, to Carole King, and more. She also featured special guest duet partners including Ariana Grande, Reba McEntire, Jennifer Hudson, and Parton. The album was released on September 27, 2019. On September 7, 2019, it was announced that Chenoweth will promote the album as a concert on Broadway for only 8 performances only at the Nederlander Theatre running November 8–10 and 15–17, 2019. The show reunited Chenoweth with Richard Jay-Alexander directing and Mary Mitchell Campbell as musical director following their previous collaboration with Chenoweth on her 2016 Broadway concert residency My Love Letter to Broadway. At each concert, Chenoweth performed most of the tracks from the album, along with favorites from her career. Every concert featured one or more different guest artists joining Chenoweth on several duets.

== Productions ==
Kristin Chenoweth: For the Girls premiered on Broadway at the Nederlander Theatre on November 8, 2019, for a limited engagement. The show was directed by Richard Jay-Alexander and choreographed by Tyler Hanes with orchestrations by Mary-Mitchell Campbell. The show was produced by James L. Nederlander and featured costumes by Christian Siriano, lighting design by Matt Berman, and sound design by Berman and Bob Hanlon. The show ran for eight performances and closed on November 17, 2019.

== Guest performers ==
Chenoweth invited a different surprise guest mainly from the New York City area to perform some songs with her each performance.

Date	Guest Performers
Nov. 8	Brittney Johnson and Jamie Barton
Nov. 9	Matinee Performance: Katie Rose Clarke and Tyler Hanes
Nov. 9	Evening Performance: Jennifer Gambatese and Julie James
Nov. 10	Jennifer Laura Thompson, Morgan James, and Stephen Schwartz
Nov. 15	Ginna Claire Mason, Cece Winans, and Isabel Merat
Nov. 16	Matinee Performance: Jennifer Laura Thompson, Laura Benanti, Tyler Hanes, Tatum Hopkins, and more
Nov. 16	Evening Performance: Laura Woyasz, Chely Wright, Kimberly Locke, and more
Nov. 17	Amanda Jane Cooper, Jessica Vosk, Shoshana Bean, Mario Cantone, and Stephen Schwartz

== Musical numbers ==
Act I

- "I Am Woman"
- "I Am Woman" (reprise)
- "The Song Remembers When"
- "The Way We Were"
- "You Don't Own Me"
- "Popular" (with guest former "Glinda")
- "Guest former "Glinda" Solo"
- “Blessed: The Millennial Song
- "Desperado"
- "Over The Rainbow"
- "The Man That Got Away"

Act II

- "When I Fall In Love"
- "Art is Calling For Me"
- "For Good"
- "Guest Artist Solo"*
- "Beautiful Dreamer"
- "I Wanna Be Around"
- "Hallelujah"
- "Sing"
- "When Angels Land"
- "How Great Thou Art"
- "Yesterday Once More"
- "Reasons For Hope"

Encore

- "I Will Always Love You"
- "Smile"
