= Kristin Chenoweth in Concert =

2012–13 concert tour by Kristin Chenoweth

- Tour by Kristin Chenoweth
- Promotional poster for the tour
- Associated album: Some Lessons Learned
- Start date: May 10, 2012
- End date: June 17, 2013
- Legs: 3
- No. of shows: 22 in North America; 5 in Australia; 27 total

Kristin Chenoweth concert chronology
- Kristin Chenoweth Live at the Met (2007); Kristin Chenoweth in Concert (2012–13); Coming Home Tour (2015–16)

Kristin Chenoweth in Concert was the debut concert tour by American actress and singer Kristin Chenoweth. The tour promoted her fourth studio album, Some Lessons Learned (2011). The tour predominantly visited the United States, with a few shows in Australia.

== Background ==
The tour was announced in February 2012 on Chenoweth's official website. While the singer had done spot shows in Los Angeles and New York City, this marked her first concert tour. In an interview with The Baltimore Sun, she stated that touring was new territory despite her Broadway background. Wanting to incorporate her new album and elements of the stage, Chenoweth stated that the show would not be "boring":, "The tour is not just a stand-and-sing affair. There's a cast. There's movement and acting. It's very well-crafted, a very full evening."

Due to a tracheal infection, Chenoweth had to reschedule shows in Chicago, Minneapolis, and Nashville. In August 2012, she suffered a head injury while filming The Good Wife. While recovering, dates in Europe and Australia were rescheduled to 2013. The rescheduled UK shows were canceled at the last minute, citing inadequate funding from the promoter, Speckulation Entertainment, as the reason.

== Concert synopsis ==
The concert was directed by Richard Jay-Alexander and accompanied by a small orchestra conducted by Mary-Mitchell Campbell. Chenoweth performed a diverse selection of songs with which she has been associated, including hits from her musicals, along with original songs from Some Lessons Learned and some of her previous solo albums, and a few of her other favorite songs.

== Setlist ==
The following setlist was obtained from the concert held on November 5, 2012, at the Segerstrom Concert Hall in Costa Mesa, California. It does not represent all concerts for the duration of the tour.

1. "Should I Be Be Sweet" from Take a Chance
2. "Goin' to the Dance with You"
3. "Maybe This Time"
4. "My Coloring Book"
5. "Hard Times Come Again No More"
6. "One Less Bell to Answer" / "A House Is Not a Home"
7. "Fathers and Daughters" by Jodi Marr and Tom Douglas
8. "Upon This Rock" by Gloria Gaither
9. "Bring Him Home"
10. "In These Shoes?"
11. "Popular"
12. "For Good"
13. "What Would Dolly Do" by Chenoweth, Desmond Child, Shane McAnally, and Bob Ezrin
14. "Wishing You Were Somehow Here Again"
15. "What If We Never" by Dianne Warren
16. "I'm Tired"
17. "No More Tears (Enough Is Enough)"
18. "All the Things You Are"
19. "I Was Here" by Victoria Shaw, Gary Burr, and Hillary Scott

Encore

20. "I Will Always Love You"

== Tour dates ==
| Date | City | Country | Venue |
|---|---|---|---|
North America
| May 10, 2012 | Seattle | United States | Paramount Theatre |
| May 11, 2012 | Berkeley | United States | Zellerbach Auditorium |
| May 12, 2012 | Los Angeles | United States | Greek Theatre |
| May 18, 2012 | Denver | United States | Ellie Caulkins Opera House |
| May 23, 2012 | Houston | United States | Jones Hall |
| May 24, 2012 | Dallas | United States | Winspear Opera House |
| June 1, 2012 | Philadelphia | United States | Academy of Music |
| June 2, 2012 | New York City | United States | New York City Center |
| June 8, 2012 | Boston | United States | Boston Opera House |
| June 9, 2012 | Baltimore | United States | Hippodrome Theatre |
| June 10, 2012 | Washington, D.C. | United States | DAR Constitution Hall |
| June 12, 2012 | Toronto | Canada | Massey Hall |
| June 13, 2012 | Cleveland | United States | Playhouse Square |
| June 15, 2012 | Detroit | United States | Detroit Opera House |
| June 22, 2012 | Atlanta | United States | John A. Williams Theatre |
| June 24, 2012 | Broken Arrow | United States | Broken Arrow Performing Arts Center |
| June 26, 2012 | Minneapolis | United States | State Theatre |
| June 28, 2012 | Nashville | United States | Andrew Jackson Hall |
| June 29, 2012 | Chicago | United States | Cadillac Palace Theatre |
| November 5, 2012 | Costa Mesa | United States | Segerstrom Concert Hall |
| November 7, 2012 | Sacramento | United States | Community Center Theater |
| November 9, 2012 | Fresno | United States | Saroyan Theatre |
Australia
| June 8, 2013^{[A]} | Adelaide | Australia | Festival Theatre |
| June 9, 2013^{[A]} | Adelaide | Australia | Festival Theatre |
| June 11, 2013 | Melbourne | Australia | Hamer Hall |
| June 14, 2013 | Brisbane | Australia | QPAC Concert Hall |
| June 17, 2013 | Sydney | Australia | Sydney Opera House |

Festivals and other miscellaneous performances
^{A} This concert was a part of the Adelaide Cabaret Festival

Cancellations and rescheduled shows

| June 16, 2012 | Chicago, Illinois | Cadillac Palace Theatre | Rescheduled to June 29, 2012 |
| June 17, 2012 | Minneapolis, Minnesota | State Theatre | Rescheduled to June 26, 2012 |
| June 20, 2012 | Nashville, Tennessee | Andrew Jackson Hall | Rescheduled to June 28, 2013 |
| July 27, 2012 | London, England | London Palladium | Rescheduled to March 11, 2013, and moved to the London Coliseum |
| July 28, 2012 | Salford, England | Lyric Theatre | Rescheduled to March 13, 2013, and moved to the Manchester Opera House in Manchester, England |
| July 31, 2012 | Edinburgh, Scotland | Usher Hall | Rescheduled to March 15, 2013, and moved to the Edinburgh Festival Theatre |
| August 2, 2012 | Cardiff, Wales | St David's Hall | Rescheduled to March 17, 2013, and moved to the Donald Gordon Theatre |
| August 4, 2012 | Dublin, Ireland | Mahony Hall | Cancelled |
| August 20, 2012 | Sydney, Australia | Lyric Theatre | Rescheduled to June 17, 2013, and moved to the Sydney Opera House |
| August 22, 2012 | Melbourne, Australia | State Theatre | Rescheduled to June 12, 2013, and moved to the Hamer Hall |
| August 25, 2012 | Adelaide, Australia | Her Majesty's Theatre | Rescheduled to June 8, 2013, and moved to the Festival Theatre |
| August 27, 2012 | Canberra, Australia | Canberra Theatre | Cancelled |
| August 29, 2012 | Brisbane, Australia | QPAC Concert Hall | Rescheuled to June 14, 2013 |
| March 11, 2013 | London, England | London Coliseum | Cancelled |
| March 13, 2013 | Manchester, England | Manchester Opera House | Cancelled |
| March 15, 2013 | Edinburgh, Scotland | Edinburgh Festival Theatre | Cancelled |
| March 17, 2013 | Cardiff, Wales | Donald Gordon Theatre | Cancelled |

=== Box office score data ===
| Venue | City | Tickets sold / available | Gross revenue |
|---|---|---|---|
| Zellerbach Auditorium | Berkeley | 1,667 / 1,667 (100%) | $122,490 |
| Greek Theatre | Los Angeles | 3,032 / 3,409 (89%) | $190,393 |
| Cobb Energy Performing Arts Centre | Atlanta | 2,431 / 2,483 (98%) | $150,209 |
| State Theatre | Minneapolis | 1,242 / 1,935 (64%) | $73,202 |
