= Paul Lazarus =

American film director

- Born: October 25; Philadelphia, Pennsylvania, U.S.
- Occupation: Director

Paul Lazarus (born October 25) is an American director, producer and writer of film, television and theatre.

He graduated from Dartmouth College, and apprenticed with the Royal Shakespeare Company in England.

== Directing credits ==
- Big Time Rush
- I'm in the Band
- Las Vegas
- Psych
- Ugly Betty
- In Case of Emergency
- Samantha Who?
- Jake in Progress
- Grounded for Life
- Kristin
- Seven Girlfriends (feature film directorial debut, 1999)
- Everybody Loves Raymond
- Buddies
- Partners
- Murder, She Wrote
- Ned & Stacey
- Baywatch
- 2gether: The Series
- Friends
- Melrose Place
- Models Inc.
- Dream On
- Class of '96
- Jack's Place
- Mad About You
- Beverly Hills, 90210
- L.A. Law
- Teech
- Pretty Little Liars
- True Jackson, VP
- The Middle

== Theatre credits ==
In the early 90s, he served as the artistic director of the historic Pasadena Playhouse. Lazarus has directed over eighty plays and musicals. His play, A Tale of Charles Dickens, co-written with Janet Jones, was produced and recorded for radio by Los Angeles Theater Works in association with the Antaeus Theater Company. Other credits include directing Neil Simon's Biloxi Blues, Personals (which was written by Marta Kauffman, David Crane, Stephen Schwartz and Alan Menken), Kristin Chenoweth in her solo concert debut, The People vs. Mona, Mark St. Germain's Camping With Henry And Tom (starring Robert Prosky, Ronny Cox and John Cunningham) and The 24th Day (starring Noah Wyle and Peter Berg).

== Other work ==
Lazarus also went on to voice direct DreamWorks Animation's only direct to video film Joseph: King of Dreams in 2000.

== Awards and nominations ==
- Los Angeles Dramalogue Award: Best Director (The 24th Day) WON
- Drama Desk Award: Best Director (Personals)
