= I Want Somebody (Bitch About) =

Single by Kristin Chenoweth

from the album Some Lessons Learned
- Released: May 31, 2011
- Recorded: 2010
- Genre: Country
- Length: 3:11
- Label: Sony Masterworks
- Songwriter(s): Diane Warren
- Producer(s): Bob Ezrin

Kristin Chenoweth singles chronology
"Dreams (Glee Cast featuring Kristin Chenoweth)" (2011)	"I Want Somebody (Bitch About)" (2011)	"Lessons Learned" (2011)

"I Want Somebody (Bitch About)" is a song by American recording artist Kristin Chenoweth. The song was written by Diane Warren and produced by Bob Ezrin for Chenoweth's fourth studio album, Some Lessons Learned (2011). The song was released on May 31, 2011 by Sony Music Entertainment's record label Masterworks Broadway, as the lead single from the album.

An accompanying music video, directed by Roman White, was Chenoweth's first televised music video and was released on Country Music Television. Chenoweth performed "I Want Somebody (Bitch About)" on many TV shows as part of the promo for her album, making the world premiere of the single on CMT's Next Superstar. Other performances include shows such as Live! with Regis and Kelly and Jimmy Kimmel Live!.

== Background ==
"I Want Somebody (Bitch About)" was written by Diane Warren, and produced by Bob Ezrin. Chenoweth said that the country song speaks about "a girl... a woman, let me re-phrase that, ME, who wants to find somebody that they can bitch about and still live without."

Warren offered the song to Chenoweth, who commented that it's funny that she can have a song on her album called "Prayer of St. Francis" and also "Bitch About"; Chenoweth noted that, at first, she had some doubts about including the song on the album because of its title.

== Critical reception ==
The song received mixed reviews from music critics. A tasteofcountry.com's review said that "Chenoweth’s turn at country music comes with the hope that she’ll be able to carry her award-winning talents from Broadway to country radio. Sadly, the only award ‘I Want Somebody’ will earn is a rotten tomato. Chenoweth’s voice is reminiscent of a movie character, but the Chippets aren’t a group one usually hopes to emulate. Her delivery is full of energy, but she packs an album’s worth of lyrics into one three-minute pop-country song." Ben Foster from countrymusicreview.net considered the song "shrill, thin, and downright painful for the ears to hear", stating that Chenoweth's "amazing award-winning talents ... were taking a siesta during this recording session". On the other hand, Allmusic.com praised the track.

== Promotion ==
Chenoweth in the video.

=== Music video ===
The music video for "I Want Somebody (Bitch About)" was directed by Roman White and was Chenoweth's first televised music video. It was released on Country Music Television, premiering on June 6, 2011 on Chenoweth's YouTube Vevo Channel. The video for the single peaked at #19 on CMT's Top Twenty Countdown and shows Chenoweth bitching about a man to her girlfriends (including actress Marisol Nichols) at a retro hair salon. In the next scene, Chenoweth is seen in a long golden dress dancing and flirting with three men while showing her female power by ditching all three of them. Later on, Chenoweth wears a short summer golden dress while performing with backup dancers.

=== Live performances and tour ===
The singer performed "I Want Somebody (Bitch About)" on various TV shows as part of the promo for her album, giving the live premiere of the single on CMT's Next Superstar. Other performances included shows such as Live! with Regis and Kelly and Jimmy Kimmel Live!.

== Track listing ==
- CD Single
1. "I Want Somebody (Bitch About)" – 3:11
- I Want Somebody (Bitch About) [Chew Fu Bitches Brew Refix]
1. "I Want Somebody (Bitch About)" [Chew Fu Bitches Brew Refix] – 2:54
