= Epic Proportions =

1986 play by Larry Coen and David Crane

- Written by: Larry Coen and David Crane.

Premiere
- Date: 1986
- Place: Manhattan Punch Line Theater; New York City

Epic Proportions is a play by Larry Coen and David Crane.

Set in the 1930s, it tells the story of brothers Benny and Phil, who go to the Arizona desert to work as extras in the Biblical epic film Exeunt Omnes, directed by the mysteriously reclusive D.W. DeWitt. All 3400 extras are supervised by Louise Goldman, who divides them into groups by asking them to count off by four. While Phil's experience as a "Three" includes relatively pleasant scenes of feasts and parades, brother Benny is a "Four," meaning he is included in all ten plagues. As things progress and everything begins to fall apart, Phil finds himself behind the cameras as the film's director, with Benny in a starring role. The two fall in love with Louise, leading to a brother vs. brother rivalry typical of epic movies.

== Plot ==
In July 1936, in a vast desert in Arizona, after the first take of legendary film director D.W. DeWitt's film, Exeunt Omnes, the assistant director, Louise Goldman introduces herself to the cast of 3400 extras and explains the details of the film production and how they will play their part. Meanwhile, former high school band musician Phil Bennet finds his younger brother Benny and tries to bring him home, but Benny tells Phil that he dreams of becoming a movie star. Phil then gets over it and tries to leave, only to be told that once a person arrives, they cannot leave until filming is completed, forcing Phil to join Benny in the cast and is ranked a Three, while Benny is Four.

A month passes, and the film is in poor shape. One night, Phil decides to help Louise with adjusting the scenes. Impressed with Phil's ideas, Louise gives him a casting role, and the two begin a romantic relationship. When Benny discovers Phil's promotion, he gets very jealous of being a Four and expresses his misery of the film's dark scenes and his distance from home, but Phil assures him that he will do fine.

The next day, the crew begins shooting the "Queen of the Nile" scene, with Benny as the Queen's slave and Phil as the executioner. However, Louise is forced to do it alone, as DeWitt will not come out of the pyramid until shooting is done, though still seemingly involved in the project, as announced by the strict head assistant Jack Kramer, who chastised Phil earlier for trying to leave in the midst of production, and also because he and Shel, another assistant, have to shoot the "Burning Bush" scene. After three takes of the Queen scene, having the third be the most successful and after Phil congratulates Benny for his performance, a devastated Shel arrives and announces that Jack was accidentally burned to death. Phil, Benny and Louise enter the pyramid and ask DeWitt to come out and help, only to find out that DeWitt had quit the project; when DeWitt saw Benny trying his hardest in his parts, he got very emotional and decided to end his career. Phil is then offered to become the head assistant to replace Jack. Overjoyed to have full ownership of the movie, Phil accepts the offer.

Phil gives Benny and Louise the main roles, Benny as Prince Ramadidis, and Louise as Princess Isis, who is in love in the movie. One night, when Phil fails to show up to a surprise birthday party Louise threw for him, despite his promise that he would, she feels betrayed. Benny comforts Louise, and the two find real love for each other, and ultimately begin an affair, unbeknownst to Phil. A few days pass, and Phil almost catches Louise cheating. Benny and Louise begin to have second thoughts about their relationship, but at the same time, they can't help it.

The next day, the crew begins working on the film's climax, where the slave is forced to prove his worth for the princess by fighting gladiators. When Benny and Louise start kissing for part of the scene, Phil discovers their relationship. He tries to apologize to Louise, but she assures him that Benny is a better man. Enraged, Phil removes them from the picture and ranks Benny a Five. The cast starts to show hatred for Phil when he says that they will change the whole movie, as they have already spent too much time away from civilization and that Phil is a horrible person for the way he treated Louise, but Phil encourages them to keep going, as the movie is "about us."

Louise tries to escape with Benny, only to be kidnapped by Phil. Benny and Phil then engage in a swordfight until DeWitt comes out of the pyramid. DeWitt then tells everyone, including Benny, Phil, and Louise that their actions would not be helpful to themselves or anyone else in life. DeWitt then finally agrees to let his people go, and Benny, who plans to marry Louise, and have Phil be the best man, leads everybody across the desert, resembling the film's title, Exeunt Omnes, Latin for "Everybody Out!"

== Production history ==
An off-Broadway production, directed by Paul Lazarus, opened on December 1, 1986 at the Judith Anderson Theatre. The cast included Louise Roberts as Louise, Michael Heinzman as Benny, Mic Murphy as Phil, Kristin Chenowith as Louise, and Humbert Alan Astredo as DeWitt.

Thirteen years later, after 27 previews, the Broadway production, directed by Jerry Zaks, opened on October 1, 1999 at the Helen Hayes Theatre, where it ran for 93 performances. The cast included Kristin Chenoweth as Louise, Alan Tudyk as Benny, Jeremy Davidson as Phil, and Richard B. Shull as DeWitt. Shull died of a heart attack thirteen days after opening night.
