= Coming Home Tour =

2015–16 concert tour by Kristin Chenoweth

- Tour by Kristin Chenoweth
- Promotional banner for the tour
- Start date: August 8, 2015
- End date: August 21, 2016
- Legs: 3
- No. of shows: 64 in North America

Kristin Chenoweth concert chronology
- Kristin Chenoweth in Concert (2012–13); Coming Home Tour (2015–16); Live on Tour (2017)

The Coming Home Tour was the second concert tour by American actress and recording artist Kristin Chenoweth. The tour followed Chenoweth's 2014 PBS special of the same name. She was accompanied by the local symphony or philharmonic orchestra for each date and received warm reviews on the tour. The shows in 2016 placed 171st on Pollstar's annual "Top 200 North American Tours", earning $6.5 million.

== Background ==
The title is taken from Chenoweth's live album, Coming Home, which was filmed and recorded in Broken Arrow, Oklahoma in 2014. It was Chenoweth's highest-peaking album, hitting #48 on the US charts, and after a Broadway run in On the 20th Century, she embarked on a tour. The tour was a rotating set of concerts consisting of Chenoweth being accompanied by a full symphony orchestra, a small band, and some of the world's major symphony orchestras.

== Critical reception ==
Overall, the tour was well received by critics. Paul M. Bessel and Barbara Braswell of DC Metro Theater Arts gave the concert in North Bethesda five out of five stars. They wrote: "Chenoweth filled the hall with her remarkably strong, beautifully clear, and thrilling coloratura soprano voice. Accompanied by an ultra-talented five-piece orchestra, this petite powerhouse delighted the audience with an ever-changing kaleidoscope of pop, country, rock, gospel, and show tunes". For the show in Sarasota, Jay Handelman of the Sarasota Herald-Tribune called the show serious yet charming. He goes on to say: "I've seen a lot of Broadway artists in concert, but few are so quickly able to wrap an audience around her finger as Chenoweth did in her sold-out concert in the Van Wezel Performing Arts Hall".

== Setlist ==
The following setlist was obtained from the March 18, 2016 concert, held at the Gaylord Performing Arts Theatre in Oklahoma City, Oklahoma. It does not represent all concerts for the duration of the tour.

1. "Que Sera, Sera"
2. "Moon River"
3. "The Man That Got Away"
4. "Taylor the Latte Boy"
5. "All the Things You Are"
6. "Fathers and Daughters" by Jodi Marr
7. "Bring Him Home"
8. "Popular"
9. "For Good"
10. "I Could Have Danced All Night"
11. "Over the Rainbow"
12. "Little Sparrow"
13. "The Heart of the Matter
14. "Upon This Rock" by Gloria Gaither
15. "I Was Here" by Victoria Shaw, Gary Burr and Hillary Scott

Encore

16. "Smile"

== Tour dates ==
Date	City	Country	Venue
North America
August 8, 2015	Park City	United States	Deer Valley Snow Park Outdoor Amphitheater
August 28, 2015	Vienna	United States	Filene Center
August 29, 2015	Kettering	United States	Fraze Pavilion
September 5, 2015	Lenox	United States	Koussevitzky Music Shed
September 11, 2015	Morristown	United States	Mayo Performing Arts Center
September 18, 2015^{[A]}	Atlanta	United States	John A. Williams Theatre
September 19, 2015	Memphis	United States	Orpheum Theatre
September 25, 2015	Rohnert Park	United States	Weill Hall
September 26, 2015	Sacramento	United States	Community Center Theater
September 27, 2015	Saratoga	United States	Mountain Winery Amphitheater
October 2, 2015	Manhattan	United States	McCain Auditorium
October 3, 2015	Kansas City	United States	Kauffman Theatre
October 4, 2015	Madison	United States	Overture Hall
October 9, 2015	Rochester	United States	Kodak Hall
October 10, 2015	Brookville	United States	Tilles Center for the Performing Arts
October 16, 2015	Omaha	United States	Kiewit Concert Hall
October 24, 2015	Chicago	United States	Chicago Theatre
October 25, 2015	East Lansing	United States	Wharton Center
November 5, 2015	Los Angeles	United States	Walt Disney Concert Hall
November 13, 2015	Fort Walton Beach	United States	Emerald Coast Conference Center
November 14, 2015	Jacksonville	United States	Moran Theater
November 24, 2015	Indianapolis	United States	Hilbert Circle Theatre
December 8, 2015	Nashville	United States	Laura Turner Concert Hall
December 9, 2015	Nashville	United States	Laura Turner Concert Hall
December 31, 2015^{[B]}	Orlando	United States	Walt Disney Theater
January 2, 2016	Philadelphia	United States	Verizon Hall
January 8, 2016	Key West	United States	Tennessee Williams Theatre
January 9, 2016	Key Largo	United States	Ocean Reef Cultural Center
January 10, 2016	Naples	United States	Hayes Hall
January 14, 2016	Fort Lauderdale	United States	Au-Rene Theater
January 16, 2016	West Palm Beach	United States	Dreyfoos Jr. Concert Hall
January 29, 2016	North Bethesda	United States	The Music Center at Strathmore
January 30, 2016	Durham	United States	Fletcher Hall
January 31, 2016	Charlotte	United States	Belk Theatre
February 13, 2016	Louisville	United States	Whitney Hall
February 26, 2016	Clearwater	United States	Ruth Eckerd Hall
February 27, 2016	Sarasota	United States	Van Wezel Performing Arts Hall
March 11, 2016	Thousand Oaks	United States	Kavli Theatre
March 12, 2016	Costa Mesa	United States	Segerstrom Hall
March 16, 2016	Orange	United States	Lutcher Theater
March 18, 2016	Oklahoma City	United States	Gaylord Performing Arts Theatre
March 19, 2016	Oklahoma City	United States	Gaylord Performing Arts Theatre
March 24, 2016	Modesto	United States	Mary Stuart Rogers Theater
March 25, 2016	Las Vegas	United States	Reynolds Hall
April 16, 2016	Providence	United States	Providence Performing Arts Center
April 23, 2016	North Bethesda	United States	The Music Center at Strathmore
April 24, 2016	North Bethesda	United States	The Music Center at Strathmore
April 30, 2016	Boston	United States	Symphony Hall
May 19, 2016	Columbus	United States	Palace Theatre
May 21, 2016	Phoenix	United States	Phoenix Symphony Hall
May 22, 2016	Phoenix	United States	Phoenix Symphony Hall
June 3, 2016	Midland	United States	Midland Center for the Arts
June 12, 2016	Birmingham	United States	Jemison Concert Hall
June 14, 2016	Orange	United States	Lutcher Theater
June 20, 2016	Chicago	United States	Orchestra Hall
June 25, 2016	Cincinnati	United States	PNC Pavilion
June 26, 2016	Wabash	United States	Ford Theater
July 15, 2016	Calistoga	United States	Castello di Amorosa
August 7, 2016	Sun Valley	United States	Sun Valley Pavilion
August 16, 2016	Provincetown	United States	Provincetown Town Hall
August 19, 2016	Atlantic City	United States	Borgata Music Box
August 20, 2016	Atlantic City	United States	Borgata Music Box
August 21, 2016	Vienna	United States	Filene Center

Festivals and other miscellaneous performances
^{A} Benefit concert for the ArtsBridge Foundation
^{B} New Year's Eve Celebration

=== Box office score data ===
Venue	City	Tickets sold / available	Gross revenue
Chicago Theatre	Chicago	2,002 / 3,553 (56%)	$157,015
Au-Rene Theater	Fort Lauderdale	2,288 / 2,478 (92%)	$180,186
Ruth Eckerd Hall	Clearwater	1,504 / 1,800 (84%)	$116,390
