= For the Girls =

Studio album by Kristin Chenoweth
- Released: September 27, 2019
- Genre: Vocal pop; jazz; country
- Length: 42:28
- Label: Concord
- Producer: Steve Tyrell

Kristin Chenoweth chronology
The Art of Elegance (2016)	For the Girls (2019)	Happiness Is...Christmas! (2021)

For the Girls is the seventh album and sixth studio album of actress and singer Kristin Chenoweth.

== Overview ==
On August 13, 2019, Chenoweth announced via her social media that she would release her next studio album in the fall of 2019. The album would be her most personal cover album yet, paying tribute to many strong female artists who inspired her, including Dolly Parton, Barbra Streisand, Doris Day, Judy Garland, Carole King, and others. She also revealed that the album would include duets with artists such as Parton and Reba McEntire, along with her former Hairspray Live co-stars Ariana Grande and Jennifer Hudson.

The lyric video for "You Don't Own Me", a duet with Ariana Grande, was released the same day as the album on September 27, 2019.

In support of the album, Chenoweth announced she would return to Broadway with her second Broadway concert residency of the same name, consisting of eight performances at Broadway's Nederlander Theatre.

== Track listing ==
For the Girls track listing
No.	Title	Writer(s)	Length
1.	"The Way We Were"	Alan Bergman, Marilyn Bergman, Marvin Hamlisch	3:24
2.	"You Don't Own Me" (with Ariana Grande)	John Madara, David White	3:08
3.	"It Doesn't Matter Anymore"	Paul Anka	3:26
4.	"I Will Always Love You" (with Dolly Parton)	Dolly Parton	3:22
5.	"What a Diff'rence a Day Makes!"	Stanley Adams, María Mendez Grever	3:42
6.	"When I Fall in Love"	Victor Young, Edward Heyman	3:33
7.	"Crazy"	Willie Nelson	3:03
8.	"The Man That Got Away"	Harold Arlen, Ira Gershwin	4:05
9.	"I'm a Woman" (with Jennifer Hudson and Reba McEntire)	Jerry Leiber and Mike Stoller	3:26
10.	"Will You Love Me Tomorrow"	Carole King, Gerry Goffin	3:33
11.	"I Wanna Be Around"	Sadie Vimmerstedt, Johnny Mercer	4:03
12.	"Desperado"	Don Henley, Glenn Frey	3:43
Total length:			42:28

== Personnel ==
- Seph Stanek – creative director
- Logan Malone – artistic director

== Charts ==
Chart performance for For the Girls
Chart (2019)	Peak position
US Billboard 200	68
