= As I Am (Kristin Chenoweth album) =

Studio album by Kristin Chenoweth
- Released: April 5, 2005
- Genre: Christian
- Length: 54:57
- Label: Sony
- Producer: Chris Harris

Kristin Chenoweth chronology
Let Yourself Go (2001)	As I Am (2005)	A Lovely Way to Spend Christmas (2008)

As I Am is Kristin Chenoweth's second solo album, released in 2005. The song Borrowed Angels was written by Diane Warren and given to Chenoweth. The same song was re-recorded and released on a country version on Chenoweth's 2011 album, Some Lessons Learned.

== Reception ==
Professional ratings
Review scores
Source	Rating
AllMusic	3.5/5 stars

The album received fairly positive reviews from critics, with AllMusic awarding it 3.5 stars, saying "There's a slickness suitable to Chenoweth's flawless voice. Though its slickness is suited to the material, As I Am can also seem to flutter inside its own perfect globe, untouched by the elements and radiant as Chenoweth's golden hair." The album received an extremely positive review from Christian website Crosswalk.com. Mixed reviews from The Ledger and The Buffalo News both praised the "Taylor, the Latte Boy" as a standout track.

The album peaked at No. 31 on Billboard′s Christian Albums chart.

== Track listing ==
No.	Title	Writer(s)	Length
1.	"It Will Be Me"	Gordon Kennedy; Wayne Kirkpatrick	3:57
2.	"Word of God Speak"	Pete Kipley; Bart Millard	3:15
3.	"Because He Lives"	Bill Gaither; Gloria Gaither	4:56
4.	"Abide in Me"	Jerry Wise	5:09
5.	"Borrowed Angels"	Diane Warren	4:02
6.	"There Will Never Be Another"	Brown Bannister; Amy Lee Grant	3:59
7.	"Poor, Wayfaring Stranger"	Traditional	5:09
8.	"Joyful, Joyful"	Ludwig van Beethoven; Henry J. van Dyke	3:29
9.	"The Song Remembers When"	Hugh Prestwood	3:55
10.	"Power"	Cindy Cruse	4:20
11.	"Just As I Am"	William B. Bradbury; Charlotte Elliott	3:42
12.	"Upon This Rock"	Gloria Gaither; Dony McGuire	4:59
13.	"Taylor, the Latte Boy"	Zina Goldrich; Marcy Allison Heisler	4:05
Total length:			54:57
