= A Little Bit Wicked =

2009 memoir of actress and singer Kristin Chenoweth

- Book cover, first edition
- Author: Kristin Chenoweth, Joni Rodgers
- Language: English
- Publisher: Touchstone
- Publication date: 14 April 2009
- ISBN: 978-1416580553

A Little Bit Wicked: Life, Love, and Faith in Stages, or simply known as A Little Bit Wicked, is the 2009 memoir of actress and singer Kristin Chenoweth. In the book, Chenoweth describes her early life and the first 16 years of her varied career in show business.

== Publication and reaction ==
The book was originally published in hardcover on March 5, 2009 by Simon & Schuster, and was re released on April 6, 2010 in paperback. The paperback edition has a smaller photo gallery, but there is a bonus chapter at the end focusing on Chenoweth's Emmy Award win. There is also a small section written by author Aaron Sorkin, who Chenoweth dated on and off for several years. Chenoweth dedicated the book to her parents, "for giving me faith, self esteem, and unconditional love".

A reviewer wrote that Chenoweth's "take on life is always tempered with 'a healthy bucket of get-over-yourself', wit, wisdom, backstage insight, the values of faith and family, and plenty of euphemistically hilarious terminology that had me laughing out loud." Another commented: "In Joni Rodgers, Chenoweth has found an ideal writer partner; not only does the book speed along at a spiffy clip, caroming through her life story with charm and humor, but it manages to always stay in character. The Chenoweth voice emerges here as vividly as it does in the theater: bright, spunky, funny, surprisingly rangy. The book is packed like a wicker picnic basket with folksy asides, self-deprecating jokes and down-to-earth Oklahoma-girl verve."

The book was ranked No. 12 on the New York Times hardcover non-fiction best-seller list.

== Chapters ==
The chapters of the book include a prologue, Overture, focusing on the 80th Academy Awards, where Chenoweth sang "That's How You Know" from Disney's Enchanted. The ensuing chapters cover her relationship with her family, early life, dance training, singing at church, her education and performances while at Oklahoma City University, her relationship with her teacher, Florence Birdwell, and the difficulties of being a 4'11" contestant in beauty pageants.

The middle of the book covers Chenoweth's early career, including regional shows, off-Broadway and national tours; surviving on very little income; her first Broadway shows, including You're a Good Man, Charlie Brown, in which she played Sally Brown and won a Tony Award; her love life; and her short lived sitcom, Kristin. A chapter is devoted to her experience as Glinda in Wicked, and another relates a story about an obsessed fan that she met while in Wicked.

The book then turns to her experiences in film, including her starring role in Into Temptation, and in television, including her role in The West Wing and Chenoweth's relationship with Sorkin. It discusses her style choices and mishaps, baking tips and struggles with being a Christian who supports gay rights. In the last chapter, she talks about doing risque photoshoots and giving up sleeping pills. An epilogue includes advice for young actors and ends with the quip: "Life's too short. I'm not."
