= Kristin Chenoweth: My Love Letter to Broadway =

- Promotional poster
- Music: Various
- Lyrics: Various
- Book: Kristin Chenoweth
- Basis: The Art of Elegance by Kristin Chenoweth
- Premiere: November 2, 2016: The Lunt-Fontanne Theater
- Productions: 2016 Broadway

Kristin Chenoweth: My Love Letter to Broadway is a 2016 musical revue-style concert, written for and starring American singer and actress Kristin Chenoweth. The show was directed by Richard Jay-Alexander, with musical direction by Mary Mitchell Campbell, and produced by James L. Nederlander. The show was a limited engagement of 12 performances at Broadway's Lunt-Fontanne Theatre from November 2 through 13, 2016.

== Production ==
Chenoweth describes the concert as, "an intimate evening of romance, glamour and laughter." The production is a limited engagement from November 2 to November 13, 2016. It features a selection of songs performed by Chenoweth during her career, songs from her latest Great American Songbook-themed album The Art of Elegance, favorite Broadway standards, and others. "Chenoweth claims that no two shows in this 12-performance engagement will be alike", with the show featuring guest appearances by different youth choirs and other special guests. The show is directed by Richard Jay-Alexander, who has directed some of Chenoweth's concerts and tours since 2012. Chenoweth's friend Mary Mitchell Campbell serves as musical director, and costumes are designed by Christian Siriano.

== Guest performers and choirs ==
Chenoweth invited different surprise guests and/or choirs mainly from the New York City area to perform some songs with her each performance.

Date	Guest Performer(s)
Nov. 2	The Youth Pride Chorus
Nov. 3	Renée Fleming and the Alumni of The Performing Arts Project choir
Nov. 4	Alan Cumming and the Pace University Choir
Nov. 5	Matinee Performance: The New Paradigm Theatre College Program
Nov. 5	Evening Performance: Norm Lewis
Nov. 6	Lea DeLaria and Mayo Performing Arts Center youth chorus
Nov. 9	Jason Robert Brown
Nov. 10	Sierra Boggess and singers from the Manhattan School of Music
Nov. 11	Andrew Lippa and the Hunter College Opera Theatre Ensemble
Nov. 12	Matinee Performance: The Furman University Singers
Nov. 12	Evening Performance: Kelli O'Hara
Nov. 13	Andy Karl and the Oklahoma City University choir

== Musical Numbers ==
The following is a sample of the songs that were performed; Chenoweth stated that "no two shows will be alike."

Act I

- "You Made Me Love You"
- "Let Me Entertain You" from Gypsy
- "I Could Have Danced All Night" from My Fair Lady
- "Easy Street" from Annie (duet with Alan Cumming)
- "Over the Rainbow" (duet with Renee Fleming)
- "Oklahoma" from Oklahoma! (duet with Kelli O'Hara)
- "Part of Your World" from The Little Mermaid (duet with Sierra Boggess)
- "Popular" from Wicked
- "Always on My Mind"
- "Losing My Mind" from Follies
- "Zing! Went the Strings of My Heart"
- "A House Is Not a Home" interpolated into the 2010 revival of Promises, Promises
- "Fifty Years", by Jason Robert Brown
- "Upon This Rock" (with Performing Arts Project choir)
- "Bring Him Home" from Les Misérables

Act II

- "One" from A Chorus Line
- "Dance: Ten; Looks: Three" from A Chorus Line
- "I'm Not a Diva"
- "Moon River"
- "Little Sparrow" from Dolly Parton's album of the same name
- "A Quiet Thing" (Kander and Ebb)
- "All the Things You Are" by Jerome Kern and Oscar Hammerstein
- "I Get Along Without You Very Well"
- "I'm Tired" from Blazing Saddles
- "I Was Here" (with Performing Arts Project choir)

Encore

- "I Couldn't Be Happier"
- "Smile"

== Reception ==
Charles Isherwood of The New York Times reviewed the show, writing:

Chenoweth's appeal is in her perky wholesomeness and golly-gee enthusiasm ... which never feel manufactured. She has lost none of the girlish glow she possessed when she first rose to Broadway stardom. ... Nor does her singing ever feel mannered, although her bright lyric soprano is a superbly trained instrument. ... [H]er voice bloomed and soared almost effortlessly, in a wide range of repertoire, much but not all drawn from Broadway shows. ... [I]n a duet with a surprise guest, the opera star Renée Fleming, on "Over the Rainbow"... Fleming cast an amused eye at Ms. Chenoweth's ... magenta sequined leotard ... and admired her courage for wearing "hot pants."... Chenoweth also brought a reflective quality to [several songs]. ... The band, though numbering just five, sounded plenty plush. ... Chenoweth's lively, natural humor was on ample display. ... Whether singing or delivering her often self-deprecating patter, Ms. Chenoweth always radiates a pleasure in performing that carries across the proverbial footlights ... she's like a singing ray of sunshine.
