= A Lovely Way to Spend Christmas =

Studio album by Kristin Chenoweth
- Released: October 14, 2008
- Recorded: June–August 2008 in Los Angeles, California
- Genre: Christmas
- Length: 43:31
- Label: Sony Classical
- Producer: Robbie Buchanan

Kristin Chenoweth chronology
As I Am (2005)	A Lovely Way to Spend Christmas (2008)	Some Lessons Learned (2011)

Professional ratings
Review scores
Source	Rating
Philadelphia Daily News	(B)
Los Angeles Times	3/5 stars

A Lovely Way to Spend Christmas is the third studio and first Christmas album released by American singer and actress Kristin Chenoweth. Released on October 14, 2008, the album sees Chenoweth collaborating with jazz musician John Pizzarelli on "Sleigh Ride/Marshmallow World". Chenoweth stated she had desired to record a Christmas album since signing with Sony Classical in 2000 after being inspired by Barbra Streisand's A Christmas Album as a child. The album has peaked at #77 on the Billboard 200 so far, and has become her first album to chart on the Billboard 200.

== Track listing ==
1. "I'll Be Home for Christmas" (Kim Gannon, Walter Kent, Buck Ram) – 3:28
2. "Christmas Island" (Lyle Moraine) – 3:12
3. "The Christmas Waltz" (Sammy Cahn, Jule Styne) – 3:00
4. "Do You Hear What I Hear?" (Noël Regney, Gloria Shayne Baker) – 4:08
5. "Sleigh Ride/Marshmallow World" (Leroy Anderson/Peter DeRose, Carl Sigman) – 3:39
6. "Sing" (Robbie Buchanan, Jay Landers, Charlie Midnight, Joe Raposo) – 3:00
7. "Silver Bells" (Ray Evans, Jay Livingston) – 4:12
8. "Come on Ring Those Bells" (A. R. Culverwell) – 3:11
9. "What Child Is This?" (William Chatterton Dix) – 4:13
10. "Home on Christmas Day" (Walter Afanasieff, Landers) – 4:00
11. "Born on Christmas Day" (Keith Andes, Buchanan, Peabo Bryson) – 4:15
12. "Sleep Well Little Children/What a Wonderful World" (Alan Bergman, Leon Klatzkin/Bob Thiele, George David Weiss) – 3:21

=== Bonus tracks ===
13. "A Lovely Way to Spend Christmas" (Harold Adamson, Jimmy McHugh) – 4:13
14. "The Lord's Prayer" (Traditional) – 2:35

== Personnel ==
- Robbie Buchanan – piano, arrangements, conducting, keyboards, programming, producer
- Jorge Calandrelli – arrangements
- Kristin Chenoweth – vocals
- George Doering – acoustic guitar, mandolin
- Johnson Enos – backing vocals
- Mick Guzauski – mixing
- Bob Krogstad – arrangements
- Jay Landers – executive producer
- Harvey Mason – drums
- John Pizzarelli – vocals (Track 5)
- Eric Rigler – Irish flute
- Aaron J. Sala – backing vocals
- Beverley Staunton – backing vocals
- Neil Stubenhaus – bass
- Jonathan Tunick – arrangements, conducting
- Randy Waldman – piano
- Frank Wolf – engineer
