= The Art of Elegance =

Studio album by Kristin Chenoweth
- Released: September 23, 2016
- Recorded: Spring–summer 2016 Blast Off Studio and Sunset Sound
- Genre: Vocal pop, jazz
- Label: Concord
- Producer: Steve Tyrell

Kristin Chenoweth chronology
Coming Home (2014)	The Art of Elegance (2016)	For The Girls (2019)

Singles from The Art of Elegance
- 1. "The Very Thought of You" Released: August 19, 2016; 2. "Smile" Released: September 9, 2016

Professional ratings
Review scores
Source	Rating
Allmusic	4/5 stars

The Art of Elegance is the sixth album and fifth studio album of actress and singer Kristin Chenoweth.

== Overview ==
In spring 2016, Chenoweth announced via Twitter that she was working on a new studio album, set to be released in spring 2017. The release date was pushed forwards though, and in mid-August, Chenoweth announced via social media that it would be released on September 23, 2016. The following week she announced the title, and shortly afterwards released the cover photo.

Chenoweth revealed that the recording would be covers of selections from the Great American Songbook, and released the first single, "The Very Thought of You" on August 19. A second single, "Smile" was released on September 9.

This album also marks Chenoweth's second Great American Songbook-themed album. Her first was her 2001 debut album Let Yourself Go, which featured mostly classic songs from the 1940s.

== Commercial performance ==
In the United States, The Art of Elegance debuted at number 36 on the Billboard 200, selling 13,000 album-equivalent units, of which 12,000 were pure sales.

== Track listing ==
No.	Title	Writer(s)	Length
1.	"Someone to Watch Over Me"	George Gershwin, Ira Gershwin	4:05
2.	"I've Got a Crush on You"	Gershwin, Gershwin	2:55
3.	"Let's Fall in Love"	Harold Arlen, Ted Koehler	3:09
4.	"Bewitched, Bothered and Bewildered"	Richard Rodgers, Lorenz Hart	4:59
5.	"Zing! Went the Strings of My Heart"	James F. Hanley	3:23
6.	"The Very Thought of You"	Ray Noble	4:23
7.	"They Can't Take That Away from Me"	Gershwin, Gershwin	3:05
8.	"A House Is Not a Home"	Hal David, Burt Bacharach	4:05
9.	"I Get Along Without You Very Well"	Hoagy Carmichael	4:27
10.	"Skylark"	Carmichael, Johnny Mercer	4:43
11.	"I'm a Fool to Want You"	Frank Sinatra, Jack Wolf, Joel Herron	5:38
12.	"Smile"	Charlie Chaplin, John Turner, Geoffrey Parsons	3:03
13.	"You're My Saving Grace..."	Steve Tyrell, Stephanie Tyrell, Barry Coffing	2:54

Target bonus tracks
No.	Title	Writer(s)	Length
14.	"If I Had You"	Ted Shapiro, Reginald Connelly, James Campbell	2:54
15.	"(I Love You) for Sentimental Reasons"	Deek Watson, William Best	3:33

== Charts ==
Chart (2016)	Peak position
US Billboard 200	36
US Top Jazz Albums (Billboard)	1

== Accolades ==
Year	Association	Category	Recipient	Nominated work	Result
2017	Grammy Awards	Best Arrangement, Instrumental and Vocals	Alan Broadbent	"I'm a Fool to Want You"	Nominated
