= The Man That Got Away =

Song written by Harold Arlen and Ira Gershwin for 1954 film A Star is Born

Song by Judy Garland

from the album A Star Is Born
- Language: English
- Released: 1954
- Songwriter: Ira Gershwin
- Composer: Harold Arlen

"The Man That Got Away" is a torch song written for the 1954 version of A Star Is Born. The song, with music by Harold Arlen and lyrics by Ira Gershwin, is performed in the film by Judy Garland. "The Man That Got Away" was ranked #11 by the American Film Institute on the AFI's 100 Years...100 Songs list. It was nominated for Best Original Song at the 27th Academy Awards but lost to "Three Coins in the Fountain".

== Composition ==
The decision by Warner Bros. in late 1952 to remake A Star Is Born, after the successful 1937 film version, offered a career comeback opportunity for Judy Garland who had been let go by MGM in 1950. Harold Arlen and Ira Gershwin were signed on to the film project to contribute new songs. Arlen had previously provided Garland with her signature songs "Over the Rainbow" and "Get Happy".

The two men's mode of collaboration was to meet in the afternoon at Gershwin's Beverly Hills home, with Arlen seated at the piano, and Gershwin writing lyrics while seated in a nearby armchair. "The Man That Got Away" was created to fulfill a request from screenwriter Moss Hart for a "dive song" in the film. When Ira's wife Leonore overheard the initial melody Arlen was trying out for the song, she reportedly said it sounded like something Ira's deceased brother and former songwriting partner George would have written. Not wanting to be an ersatz George Gershwin, Arlen stopped playing it and switched to a different melody that was from an unfinished song he had worked on a few years earlier with lyricist Johnny Mercer. At the time, the song had "elegantly literate" but forgettable lyrics such as: "I've seen Sequoia, it's really very pretty / The art of Goya, and Rockefeller City / But since I saw you, I can't believe my eyes." According to an Arlen biography, Gershwin found the new tune compelling, "particularly the insistent movement of the rhythm; he listened a while and suggested as a possible title 'The Man That Got Away'". In his book Lyrics on Several Occasions, Gershwin recounts how the title hit him as a paraphrase of the fisherman's boast, "You should have seen the one that got away."

The composition of "The Man That Got Away" proved arduous, with hours passing before Gershwin was satisfied with the opening stanza. The style and tempo direction for the song was, "Slowly, with a steady insistence." Gershwin achieved that effect by creating short, impactful couplets, often with only two or three stresses per line, to build up a sense of desolation and intense longing as expressed by the lovesick singer, for example: "The night is bitter / The stars have lost their glitter"; "The man that won you / Has run off and undone you"; and "The road gets rougher / It's lonelier and tougher." Arlen was pleased with the result. He said the original lyrics had made the song sound "puny", whereas Gershwin's dramatic new words made it "like the Rock of Gibraltar."

Gershwin did not want any of their songs for A Star Is Born to be "leaked" until all of them were ready, and he made Arlen promise to respect this. Shortly after they composed the film's first two songs, "Gotta Have Me Go with You" and "The Man That Got Away", Gershwin reiterated his request for secrecy when Arlen mentioned he would be driving to Palm Springs for the weekend. Both men knew that Judy Garland and her husband Sid Luft (producer of A Star Is Born) were vacationing there. On Saturday morning, Arlen went to the Tamarisk Country Club and encountered Garland and Luft as they were teeing off on the golf course. Arlen walked with them while they played. In the middle of their round, he began softly whistling the melody of "The Man That Got Away" (he later wrote, "I don't know what tempted me"). Garland soon guessed the tune's provenance and insisted the three of them retire to the clubhouse where there was a piano for Arlen to play the song properly. In Arlen's words, Garland and Luft "went wild with joy" when they heard it. Despite Arlen's caution that it was supposed to be a secret, they phoned Ira anyway to tell him "how wonderful it was, and he was delighted. And when I came back [to Los Angeles] he was beaming and never said a word about my broken promise."

== Recording and performance ==
=== Judy Garland's version ===
"The Man That Got Away"

Single by Judy Garland

from the album A Star Is Born: The Original Motion Picture Soundtrack
- B-side: "Here's What I'm Here For"
- Released: June 1954
- Recorded: September 4, 1953
- Studio: Warner Bros. Studios Burbank
- Genre: Traditional pop
- Length: 3:39
- Label: Columbia
- Songwriters: Harold Arlen, Ira Gershwin

Judy Garland recorded "The Man That Got Away" on September 4, 1953 on a Warner Bros. sound stage. It required two hours and four takes to complete the recording. Ray Heindorf directed the Warner Bros. orchestra. He and Skip Martin had spent several days working out the song's arrangement but it was time well spent, as Ronald Haver notes:

The Martin/Heindorf version has turned out to be the best arrangement the song has ever received. Virtually every version recorded over the years has used it or a variation thereof, and Garland used it for years in her concert appearances; the first four bars of trombone solo never failed to evoke appreciative bursts of applause from audiences, who recognized what was coming.

In Moss Hart's script for A Star Is Born, Garland (as Esther Blodgett) sings "a dive song" at the Downbeat Club on Sunset Blvd. during a musicians-only session after closing time. The chairs are up on the tables for floor cleaning, the air is filled with cigarette smoke, and Blodgett—without an audience other than her musician friends (or so she believes, not realizing that movie icon Norman Maine has entered the nightclub)—is encouraged by the pianist to rise from her seat on the piano bench and "take it from the top." Her performance of "The Man That Got Away" is arguably the film's most crucial scene because it is the means by which Blodgett persuades Maine (as well as us in the audience) that she possesses "that little something extra": star quality.

As the scene opens, the camera perspective establishes Maine's point-of-view, "which is what will anchor the whole sequence. His gaze on her is what's important, it's how she, through him, will demonstrate to us that she is in fact the great singer and star he will know her to be once the song ends." Garland's rendition was unusual for being shot in a single continuous take, a favorite technique of director George Cukor: "I wanted the camera to follow her, always in front ... sometimes she would go to the side and almost disappear out of the frame ... all in one long take, for the whole musical number. It isn't easy for an actor or an actress to carry a long take—you have to be strong. I wanted to do it with Judy because I knew she could sustain it."

Initial filming of the song began on October 20, 1953, but Cukor soon became frustrated with his cinematographer Winton Hoch. In Cukor's opinion, Hoch (known as an outstanding cameraman of outdoor scenes) wasn't capturing the interior nightclub atmosphere the way the director wanted: "low light levels, the impressionistic feeling of the musical instruments, Garland moving in and out of pools of light with the camera following." Cukor communicated his displeasure to Jack Warner and Sid Luft, and Hoch was replaced by Sam Leavitt.

Changes were then made to the costume and set, and a second round of filming began on October 27. Art director Gene Allen said, "The first time it all looked as if we had painted a set to look like a bar. It needed to be softened up some way, because it looked a little garish. So to give it a slightly impressionistic look, I convinced Sam [Leavitt] to let us put a scrim between the musicians and the back bar. If you look very carefully at that scene you can see the scrim nailed down on the floor".

Assistant director Earl Bellamy described working with Garland on "The Man That Got Away":

We had the playback machine there with the recording of the song; and, you know, most singers just mouth to the playback. Not Judy. When she sang to a playback... [t]hat playback was turned on to its peak, but you could hear Judy above it. She wanted me to start it full blast and then she started singing and she topped it. You could stand anyplace and you could hear that playback, but you could hear Judy clear as a bell... It was absolutely beautiful; she put everything that she could possibly put of herself into the song... When we finished the number, she took me aside and said, "Earl, give me a break before the next take," and I said, "Fine," and she went to her dressing room, and we waited about fifteen minutes, and she came back fine and did the whole thing again. Each time she was just as tremendous as she ever was. She never varied when she sang, and she never missed."

Due to technical problems with staging, lighting, etc., Garland had to do a total of 27 takes, both partial and complete, over a three-day period.

While "The Man That Got Away" and other early scenes were being filmed, there was a debate among Warner Bros. studio executives about switching from their "WarnerScope" technology to the newer CinemaScope. The latter had been developed by 20th Century Fox for The Robe (1953) and was dazzling audiences. Side-by-side comparisons of A Star Is Born scenes shot with both methods demonstrated CinemaScope's superiority. Jack Warner and Sid Luft were so impressed with the effect of combining Technicolor with wide-screen CinemaScope, they agreed to restart principal photography on the film, even at a significant loss in time and money. It meant scrapping nearly two weeks of previous footage of "The Man That Got Away" (an estimated loss of $300,000) and shooting the song sequence again. The original takes of the song were added as a special feature on the deluxe DVD edition of A Star Is Born released in 2010.

In February 1954, the song was filmed for a third time, with a new hairstyle and costume for Garland and a brand new set. Cukor felt they had finally got it right, as he indicated in a letter to Moss Hart: "I think we have generated a lot of sex. She looks attractive and the whole thing is an improvement over the original... She looks perfectly charming in a new Jean Louis dress, and I know that this too is an enormous improvement over the way we first did it—it has fun and spirit."

In a 2010 appreciation of A Star Is Born, Richard Brody of The New Yorker wrote:

The number she performs at the club, "The Man That Got Away," is one of the most astonishing, emotionally draining musical productions in Hollywood history, both for Garland's electric, spontaneous performance and for Cukor's realization of it. The song itself, by Harold Arlen and Ira Gershwin, is the apotheosis of the torch song, and Garland kicks its drama up to frenzied intensity early on, as much with the searing pathos of her voice as with convulsive, angular gestures that look like an Expressionist painting come to life.

For the rest of her career, Garland sang "The Man That Got Away" as a regular part of her concert repertoire. She also sang it on television on The Sammy Davis Jr. Show in 1966.

=== 2019 dance version ===
In November 2019, Universal Records issued a new dance/club version of the song, which was remixed by Eric Kupper and as such, both Garland and Kupper received billing on the single. The track also gave Garland her first appearance on the Billboard Dance Club Songs chart (albeit posthumously), debuting at number 41 in the November 9, 2019 issue.

== Chart positions ==
Chart (2019)	Peak position
U.S. Billboard Dance Club Songs	10

== Covers ==
- The song has occasionally been sung as "The Gal That Got Away" by male singers such as Frank Sinatra, Tony Bennett, Sammy Davis Jr. and Bobby Darin.
- Clare Fischer's novel arrangement (recorded June 1960, released February 1962), scored for strings, harp, and a jazz quartet led by vibraphonist Cal Tjader, was one of the highlights of Cal Tjader Plays Harold Arlen, the earliest recorded document of Tjader's and Fischer's longstanding association.
- Jeff Buckley frequently performed the song (under its original title) on his last tour before his death in 1997. His live performance of the song at Great American Music Hall in San Francisco made it on to his posthumous album Mystery White Boy in 2000.
- Audra McDonald also sang a version, which is on her album How Glory Goes.
- Barbra Streisand sang a version on her 1993-94 concert tour, publicly dedicating her rendition to Garland's memory.
- The song was covered by Ella Fitzgerald on her album Jazz at the Philharmonic, The Ella Fitzgerald Set, in a recording featuring Ray Brown on bass. She recorded it again for Verve on her double-album Ella Fitzgerald Sings the Harold Arlen Songbook (1961).
- Jim Bailey sang the song as Garland on The Ed Sullivan Show in 1970 and retained the song in his repertoire.
- Rufus Wainwright performed it in his tribute revues of Garland's best known songs, recorded on the live album Rufus Does Judy at Carnegie Hall (2007).
- Maria Friedman covered the song on her self-titled album, which was reissued in the U.S. under the title Now & Then.
- Cher recorded the song for her album Bittersweet White Light (1973).
- Shirley Bassey recorded the song for her album The Fabulous Shirley Bassey (1959).
- Sheena Easton also included a rather freeform interpretation of the song on her album No Strings (1993).
- Hilary Swank sings along with Garland while watching a DVD of the original movie during her lonely 30th birthday in the 2007 romantic comedy P.S. I Love You.
- In 2008 on the BBC-TV show I'd Do Anything, a casting contest for Oliver!, eighteen-year-old unknown Jessie Buckley sang the song. In A Star Is Born (1954), the performance of the song by unknown Esther Blodgett (Judy Garland) in front of influential movie star Norman Maine (James Mason) is, in fact, the star-being-born moment of the story. Maine tells Blodgett, "You're a great singer...you've got that little something extra...star quality". After Buckley sang the song, head judge Andrew Lloyd Webber described it as "the best performance by a girl your age I have ever heard". In later episodes, he referred to Buckley's "star quality". Before the final vote, when Buckley was one of the two finalists, Webber said, "Jessie has the sacred flame of star quality".
- Julie London released the a “sexiest of all time” cover of the song on her 1963 album, “Love on the Rocks.” As well as a recorded live version in 1964 on her album “Live at the Americana.”
- Lorna Luft (Garland's daughter from her marriage with Sid Luft) also sings the song on her album Songs My Mother Taught Me. She also sings it in concert from time to time.
- Courtney Love and her band Hole performed the song in concert on multiple occasions during their 2010 tour.
- Sylvia Brooks recorded this song on her album Dangerous Liaisons (2009).
- Idina Menzel sang this song during her Spring 2009 tour promoting her album I Stand.
- Raul Esparza sang a rendition without changing the gender, leaving the lyric as "man", at the February 22, 2010 Broadway Backwards 5 benefit for NYC's Lesbian & Gay Community Center and Broadway Cares/Equity Fights AIDS.
- On May 1, 2010, on the BBC TV show Over the Rainbow, Lauren Samuels sang this song. Andrew Lloyd Webber said she made the song her own.
- Kristin Chenoweth sang the song on her Coming Home Tour.
- Billy Porter sang the song on Pose while performing in an AIDS Cabaret, without changing the gender, leaving the lyric as "man" in 2018.
- Elizabeth Gillies sings the song on Dynasty while performing as a lounge singer in the imagined version of Liam Ridley’s dictated novel pitch in the episode “You See Most Things in Terms of Black & White” in 2020.
