= Coming Home (Kristin Chenoweth album) =

Live album by Kristin Chenoweth
- Released: November 18, 2014
- Recorded: August 22, 2014
- Genre: Country, pop, vocal pop, disco
- Length: 71:15 (bonus track version)
- Label: Concord Records
- Producer: Jay Krugman

Kristin Chenoweth chronology
Some Lessons Learned (2011)	Coming Home (2014)	The Art of Elegance (2016)

Professional ratings
Review scores
Source	Rating
Allmusic	4/5 stars

Coming Home is a 2014 PBS special featuring a concert by Kristin Chenoweth. The concert was later made into a CD and DVD.

== Concert and broadcast ==
In 2014, PBS asked Chenoweth to do a concert for a special. She chose to do it in her hometown of Broken Arrow, Oklahoma. The concert featured songs from her career, as well as songs she has enjoyed since her childhood. Chenoweth performed a duet of "For Good" with Broken Arrow resident Axyl Langford, and the Broken Arrow High School choir providing backup vocals in "Upon this Rock".

Chenoweth stated: "I chose ‘My Coloring Book’ because when I was in college, my voice teacher didn’t think I understood the song, and told me to pull it out one day when I did. So I’m singing it all these years later, and she was there to witness it. I also like to reintroduce songs that people may not be familiar with, like Stephen Foster’s ‘Hard Times,’ which is from 1853 but sounds like it could have been written today. And I love to do songs that people wouldn’t expect from me, like ‘Enough Is Enough.’" "I’m known for musical theatre,” she continues, “but I grew up with country and gospel, and I’ve always loved standards and operas. So I figured that this live performance would be a good chance to show people the different things that influenced me and the different things I can do."

Beginning on November 28, 2014, the concert was aired on PBS stations nationwide, as Chenoweth's first concert on television. The special was part of the 2014 PBS Arts Fall Festival.

== CD ==
On November 17, 2014, a live CD of the concert was released by Concord Records. There are two versions of the album, the regular one, and the Target version with three bonus tracks.

The album consists of the songs:

1. I Could Have Danced All Night from My Fair Lady
2. Maybe This Time from Cabaret
3. My Coloring Book by John Kander and Fred Ebb
4. Bring Him Home from Les Miserables
5. Fathers and Daughters by Jodi Marr
6. Hard Times Come Again No More by Stephen Foster
7. Upon This Rock by Gloria Gaither and Dony McGuire
8. Over the Rainbow from The Wizard of Oz
9. Popular from Wicked
10. For Good from Wicked
11. Little Sparrow by Dolly Parton from her album Little Sparrow
12. Wishing You Were Somehow Here Again from The Phantom of the Opera
13. All the Things You Are from Very Warm for May
14. No More Tears (Enough is Enough) (sung with Chelsea Packard) by Paul Jabara and Bruce Roberts
15. I Was Here by Victoria Shaw, Gary Burr and Hillary Scott
Target Bonus Tracks
1. I Will Always Love You by Dolly Parton
2. Heart of the Matter by Don Henley
3. I'll Be Home for Christmas by Bing Crosby

The album peaked at No. 48 on the Billboard 200. selling 8,000 copies in the first week. The album has sold 47,000 copies in the United States as of August 2016.

== Personnel ==
- Lead Vocals- Kristin Chenoweth
- Produced by- Jay Krugman
- Recorded and mixed by- David Reitzas
- Directed by- Kenny Ortega
- Musically Directed by- Mary Mitchell Campbell
- Mastered by- Paul Blakemore (from CMG Mastering)
- Featured Vocals- Tyler Hanes, Chelsea Packard, Axyl Langford, Will Taylor, Mary-Mitchell Campbell
- Additional Vocals- Broken Arrow High School Choir
- Broken Arrow High School Show Choir directed by- Justin Rosser
- Guitar- Eric Davis
- Bass- Brian Hamm
- Drums- Damien Bassman
- Percussion- Steve Craft
- Violin- Justin Smith, Michelle Sherman
- Cello- Krassimira Figg
- Woodwinds- Reid Bennett, Gary Linde
- Trumpets- Dave Johnson, Steven Goforth
- Orchestrations- Oran Elder
- Additional Orchestrations- Matt Aument, William David Brohn, Bruce Coughlin, Mary-Mitchell Campbell
- Lighting & Sound Design- Matt Berman
- Stage Managed by- Rocky Noel
- Music Contractor- Rich Fisher
- Music Consultant- Jill Dell'Abate
- Hair and Makeup- Jon Lieckfelt
- Outfits- Idra Alta Moda, Houta Hippie, Barbara Kaiser
- Photography- Jill Solomon, James Gibbard

== DVD ==
The DVD of the concert was released on February 3, 2015. Like the concert, the DVD includes Chenoweth's Father's Day video from 2014. It also shows some behind the scenes footage of the making of the concert, CD, DVD and PBS special.

== Charts ==
Chart (2014)	Peak position
US Billboard 200	48
