= Kristin (TV series) =

2001 American television sitcom

- Genre: Sitcom
- Created by: John Markus
- Directed by: Lee Shallat Chemel (5 episodes); Paul Lazarus (2 episodes); Ken Levine (2 episodes); Jerry Zaks (2 episodes); Brian K. Roberts (1 episode); James Widdoes (1 episode)
- Starring: Kristin Chenoweth; Jon Tenney; Larry Romano; Ana Ortiz; Dale Godboldo
- Theme music composer: Jeanine Tesori; Dick Scanlan
- Composer: Mat Morse
- Country of origin: United States
- Original language: English
- No. of seasons: 1
- No. of episodes: 13 (7 unaired)

Production
- Executive producers: John Markus; Earl Pomerantz
- Producers: Teri Schaffer; Jessie Ward; Kristin Chenoweth; Dan Cohen; F J Pratt
- Camera setup: Multi-camera
- Running time: 22–24 minutes
- Production companies: Markusfarms Productions; Paramount Network Television

Original release
- Network: NBC
- Release: June 5 – July 10, 2001

Kristin is an American television sitcom created by John Markus, starring Kristin Chenoweth. The series premiered on NBC on June 5, 2001. It was canceled on July 10, 2001, after six episodes had been screened (out of thirteen produced).

== Plot ==
Kristin Yancey (Kristin Chenoweth), a perky Oklahoma woman, takes a job as a secretary in New York City while she looks for work in show business. What she does not know is that her boss Tommy Ballantine (Jon Tenney), hired her sight unseen from a local Baptist Church congregation in hopes of repairing his public image, which had been damaged by nearly nonstop sexual imbroglios.

== Cast ==
- Kristin Chenoweth as Kristin Yancey
- Jon Tenney as Tommy Ballantine, Kristin's boss
- Larry Romano as Aldo Bonnadonna, Tommy's right-hand man
- Ana Ortiz as Santa Clemente, Kristin's friend
- Dale Godboldo as Tyrique Kimbrough, an employee of the firm
- Christopher Durang as Reverend Thornhill of the Baptist congregation

== Reception ==
Michael Speier of Variety called the series a "dud" with "incredibly stale one-liners, on-the-cheap production values and boring supporting players". Anita Gates in The New York Times wrote: "The plots and situations are just tired, like the show's saccharine theme song".

As of 2025, none of the series has been released on DVD for home consumption.

== Episodes ==
No.	Title	Directed by	Written by	Original release date	Prod. code
1	"Pilot"	James Widdoes	John Markus	June 5, 2001	001
2	"The In-Crowd"	Brian K. Roberts	Dawn Urbont	June 12, 2001	004
3	"The Homewrecker"	Lee Shallat-Chemel	Alicia Sky Varinaitis	June 19, 2001	011
4	"The Scene"	Ken Levine	Story by : Jamie Gorenberg; Teleplay by : John Markus & Earl Pomerantz	June 26, 2001	006
5	"The Mother"	Lee Shallat-Chemel	John Markus & Earl Pomerantz	July 3, 2001	012
6	"The Rival"	Jerry Zaks	Dan Cohen & F.J. Pratt	July 10, 2001	013
7	"The Gift"	Lee Shallat Chemel	John Markus & Earl Pomerantz	Unaired	002
8	"The Gatekeeper"	Lee Shallat-Chemel	Bill Wrubel	Unaired	003
9	"The Escort"	Paul Lazarus	Teri Schaffer	Unaired	005
10	"The Rift"	Paul Lazarus	Dan Cohen & F.J. Pratt	Unaired	007
11	"The Showdown"	Jerry Zaks	Bill Wrubel	Unaired	008
12	"The Crush"	Ken Levine	Alicia Sky Varinaitis	Unaired	009
13	"The Secret"	Lee Shallat Chemel	John Markus & Earl Pomerantz	Unaired	010
