= Let Yourself Go (album) =

Studio album by Kristin Chenoweth
- Released: May 29, 2001
- Recorded: Clinton Recording Studios in June 2000
- Genre: Vocal pop, jazz
- Length: 54:44
- Label: Sony
- Producer: Jeffrey Lesser

Kristin Chenoweth chronology
Let Yourself Go (2001)	As I Am (2005)

Professional ratings
Review scores
Source	Rating
AllMusic	4/5 stars

Let Yourself Go is Kristin Chenoweth's debut solo album, released in 2001. The backing orchestra is Rob Fisher and the Coffee Club Orchestra. The fifth track, "Hangin' Around with You", features actor Jason Alexander. The album consists mostly of musical numbers and jazz standards, with three songs that were written specially for the album: "The Girl in 14G", "Just an Ordinary Guy" and "Goin' to the Dance with You".

== Track listing ==
1. "Let Yourself Go" from the 1936 film Follow the Fleet
2. "If You Hadn't but You Did" from the 1951 musical revue Two on the Aisle
3. "How Long Has This Been Going On?" from the 1928 musical Rosalie
4. "My Funny Valentine" from the 1937 musical Babes in Arms
5. "Hangin' Around with You" from the 1930 musical Strike Up the Band
6. "The Girl in 14G"
7. "I'll Tell the Man in the Street" from the 1938 musical I Married an Angel
8. "I'm a Stranger Here Myself" from the 1943 musical One Touch of Venus
9. "Nobody Else but Me" from the 1946 Broadway revival of the musical Show Boat
10. "Nobody's Heart Belongs to Me" from the musical By Jupiter / "Why Can't I?" from the 1929 musical Spring Is Here
11. "Should I Be Sweet?" from the 1933 musical Take a Chance
12. "Just an Ordinary Guy"
13. "Goin' to the Dance with You"
14. "On a Turquoise Cloud"
15. "You'll Never Know" from the 1943 film Hello, Frisco, Hello
16. "Daddy"
