= Kristin Chenoweth =

American actress and singer (born 1968)

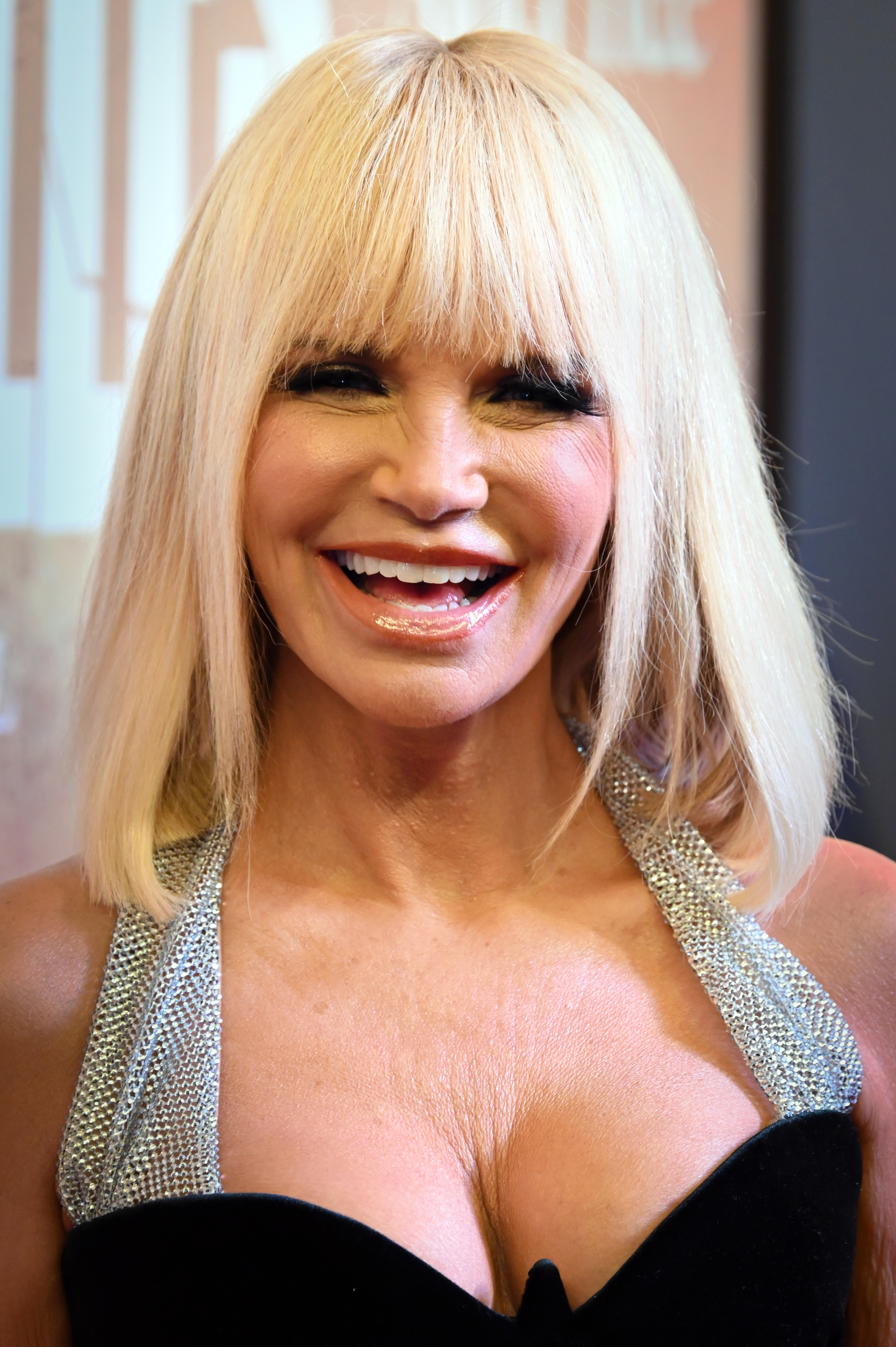
- Chenoweth in 2025
- Born: Kristi Dawn Chenoweth; July 24, 1968 (age 58); Broken Arrow, Oklahoma, U.S.
- Education: Oklahoma City University (BM, MFA)
- Occupations: Actress; singer
- Years active: 1991–present
- Spouse: Josh Bryant (m. 2023)
- Musical career
- Genres: Musical theatre; pop; jazz; country pop
- Labels: Concord Records; Sony; Sony Masterworks
- Website: officialkristinchenoweth.com

Kristin Dawn Chenoweth (/ˈtʃɛnoʊwɛθ/; born Kristi Dawn Chenoweth; July 24, 1968) is an American actress and singer, with credits in musical theatre, film, and television. In 1999, she won a Tony Award for Best Featured Actress in a Musical for her performance as Sally Brown in You're a Good Man, Charlie Brown on Broadway. In 2003, Chenoweth was nominated for a second Tony Award for originating the role of Glinda in the musical Wicked. Her television roles include Annabeth Schott in NBC's The West Wing and Olive Snook on the comedy drama Pushing Daisies, for which she won a Primetime Emmy Award for Outstanding Supporting Actress in a Comedy Series in 2009.

Chenoweth sang gospel music as a child in Oklahoma and studied opera before deciding to pursue a career in musical theatre. In 1997, she made her Broadway debut in Steel Pier, winning a Theatre World Award. Her other Broadway credits include Eve in The Apple Tree (2006); Fran in Promises, Promises (2010); Lily in On the Twentieth Century (2015), for which she received a third Tony Award nomination; and the title role in The Queen of Versailles (2025). She has also appeared in five City Center Encores! productions, Off-Broadway, and in regional theatre.

Chenoweth had her own sitcom, Kristin, in 2001, and has guest-starred on many shows, including Sesame Street and Glee, for which she was nominated for Emmy Awards in 2010 and 2011. She also starred in the ABC TV series GCB in 2012, played Lavinia in Trial & Error in 2018, and played the characters Mildred Layton and Miss Codwell in the musical comedy series Schmigadoon! in 2021 and 2023, respectively. In films, she has played mostly character roles, such as in Bewitched (2005), The Pink Panther (2006) and RV (2006). She has played roles in made-for-TV movies, such as Descendants (2015) and several Christmas-themed ones; done voice work in animated films such as Rio 2 (2014) and The Peanuts Movie (2015) along with the animated TV series Sit Down, Shut Up and BoJack Horseman; hosted several award shows; and released several albums of songs, including A Lovely Way to Spend Christmas (2008), Some Lessons Learned (2011), Coming Home (2014), The Art of Elegance (2016) and For the Girls (2019). Chenoweth also wrote a 2009 memoir, A Little Bit Wicked.

== Early life ==
Chenoweth was adopted when she was five days old by Junie Smith Chenoweth and Jerry Morris Chenoweth, both chemical engineers from Broken Arrow, Oklahoma, a suburb of Tulsa, and named Kristi Dawn Chenoweth. She revealed in her 2023 book I'm No Philosopher, but I Got Thoughts that her biological parents were bassist Billy Ethridge (briefly a member of ZZ Top) and Wanda Lynn Cooper, to whom Chenoweth referred as "Mama Lynn". Ethridge (some sources spell it Etheridge) was also a member of The Chessmen. Chenoweth eventually met her biological mother. She believed that she was of one-quarter Cherokee descent, but genetic testing showed that she is 4% Native American. (Note: A 2026 episode of the television series Finding Your Roots featured Chenoweth learning about her family history, including using the genetic test.)

At an early age, she performed gospel songs for local churches. A performing highlight of her childhood was a solo appearance at the Southern Baptist Convention national conference at the age of 12, where she performed the Evie song "Four Feet Eleven". The chorus begins, "I'm only 4 feet 11, but I'm going to Heaven" (Chenoweth is 4 ft 11 in (150 cm) in height). After graduating from Broken Arrow Senior High School, where she participated in school plays, Chenoweth attended Oklahoma City University, where she was a member of Gamma Phi Beta (Beta Omicron) sorority. She earned a bachelor's degree in musical theatre in 1990 and a master's degree in opera performance in 1992, studying under voice instructor and mentor, Florence Birdwell. While at OCU, Chenoweth competed in beauty pageants, winning the title of Miss OCU and was the second runner-up in the Miss Oklahoma pageant in 1991. In 1992, Chenoweth participated in a studio recording of The Most Happy Fella.

While she was in college and working towards her master's degree, Chenoweth performed at the Lyric Theatre in Oklahoma City, among other regional theatres, in roles like June in Gypsy, Liesl in The Sound of Music, Fran in Promises, Promises, and Tuptim in The King and I. At age 19, she spent a summer as a cast member of the "Way Out West" stage show at Opryland USA in Nashville, Tennessee. As she completed her master's degree, Chenoweth participated in several vocal competitions and was named "most promising up-and-coming singer" in the Metropolitan Opera National Council auditions, which came with a full scholarship to Philadelphia's Academy of Vocal Arts. Two weeks before school started, however, she went to New York City to help a friend move. While there, she auditioned for the 1993 Paper Mill Playhouse production of the musical Animal Crackers and was cast in the role of Arabella Rittenhouse. She turned down the scholarship and moved to New York to play the role and pursue a career in musical theatre.

== Career ==
=== Theatre ===
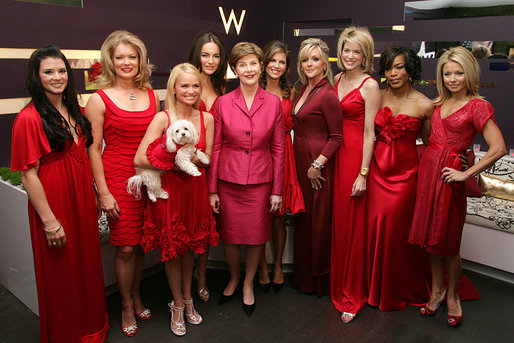
Chenoweth (holding her dog, Madeline Kahn "Maddie" Chenoweth) with Laura Bush and celebrity models in the 2007 Red Dress Collection Celebrity Fashion Show to raise awareness of heart disease

After Animal Crackers, Chenoweth continued to appear in regional theatre productions, such as Babes in Arms at The Guthrie Theater in Minneapolis, and Phantom (as Christine; she also toured in Germany in this role), playing roles in Off-Broadway productions like Luisa in The Fantasticks and Kristy in Box Office of the Damned (both in 1994). In 1997, she appeared as Hyacinth in the Roundabout Theater Company production of Moliere's farcical Scapin, earning her first New York Times review, with Ben Brantley writing "Kristin Chenoweth's sob-prone ingenue is delightful". She made her Broadway debut in the spring of 1997 as Precious McGuire in the musical Steel Pier by Kander and Ebb, for which she won a Theatre World Award. In 1998 she reprised one of her regional theatre roles, Anne Draper, in the City Center Encores! staged concert of the George and Ira Gershwin musical Strike Up the Band and created roles in the original Lincoln Center Theater production of William Finn's A New Brain. Ben Rimalower, in Playbill, wrote: "It's unlikely anyone will equal Kristin Chenoweth in the role of 'Nancy D., the waitress.'"

Chenoweth played Sally Brown, the title character's little sister, in the 1999 Broadway revival of You're a Good Man, Charlie Brown. Sally was not present in the original production. Chenoweth won Tony and Drama Desk Awards for Best Featured Actress in a Musical for her performance. Later that year, she starred on Broadway in the short-lived comic play Epic Proportions, followed by starring as Daisy Gamble in the Encores! production of On a Clear Day You Can See Forever in February 2000.

After this, Chenoweth split her time between stage and TV or film roles and released her first solo album, Let Yourself Go (2001). In 2002, she performed in the City Center Encores! 10th Anniversary Bash. In October 2003, she returned to Broadway (after the San Francisco tryout) in the musical Wicked, as Glinda the Good Witch. She was nominated for a 2004 Tony Award as Best Leading Actress in a Musical for her performance; her co-star Idina Menzel (who played Elphaba, the Wicked Witch of the West) won the award. Chenoweth was also nominated for the Drama Desk Award and the Drama League Award for this role. Ben Rimalower, in Playbill, wrote that, for Glinda, "the gold standard was unquestionably and indelibly set" by Chenoweth's performances. After playing Glinda for nine months, Chenoweth left Wicked, on July 18, 2004, soon joining the cast of The West Wing in Los Angeles. The Wicked cast album earned a 2005 Grammy Award.

Chenoweth played Cunegonde in the New York Philharmonic revival of Candide, directed by Lonny Price, in May 2004. The production was also broadcast on PBS's Great Performances. A performance of the rarely sung duet "We Are Women", between Cunegonde and the Old Lady (played by Patti Lupone), was included in the production.

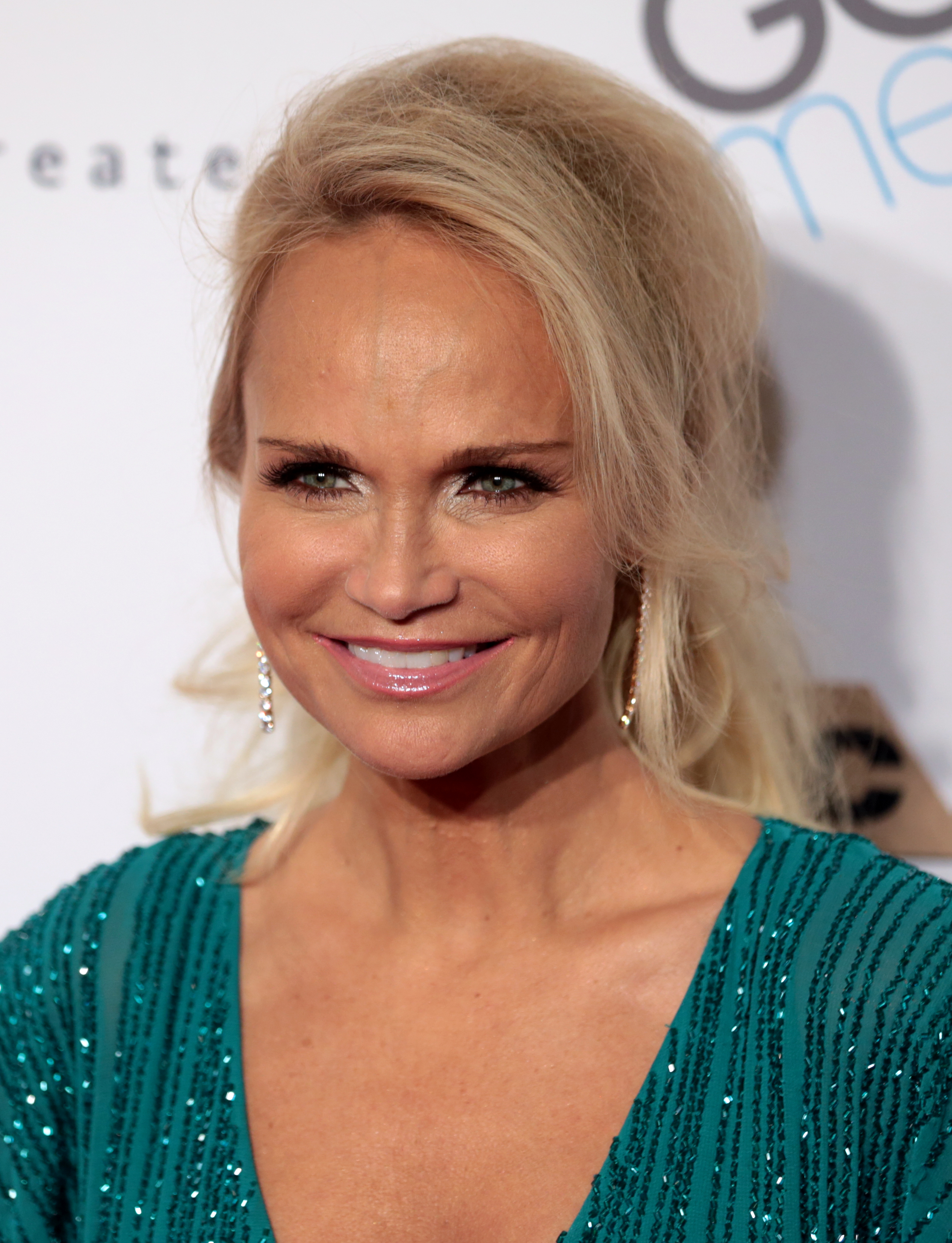
Chenoweth in 2018

From December 2006 to March 2007, following a 2005 Encores! presentation of the piece, Chenoweth starred on Broadway as Eve in a revival of The Apple Tree with co-stars Brian d'Arcy James and former fiancé Marc Kudisch. She received nominations for the Drama Desk Award and the Drama League Award. She hosted the 2007 Drama Desk Awards ceremony. The same year, she played Female Star in the 2007 Encores! presentation of Stairway to Paradise and returned for her fifth Encores! production in Jerome Kern and Oscar Hammerstein II's Music in the Air in 2009. Chenoweth was scheduled to return to The Metropolitan Opera in 2010 to play Samira in John Corigliano's opera The Ghosts of Versailles. The Met canceled the expensive production in 2008 as the U.S. economy weakened.

In 2009, Chenoweth was part of the rotating ensemble cast of Nora and Delia Ephron's Love, Loss, and What I Wore off-Broadway at the Westside Theater. She next starred as Fran Kubelik in the 2010 Broadway revival of the musical Promises, Promises, opposite Sean Hayes, which opened on April 25, 2010. The songs "I Say a Little Prayer" and "A House Is Not a Home" were added for her to sing. Chenoweth and Hayes remained in the cast until the show closed on January 2, 2011, although she missed performances from December 29, 2010, to January 1, 2011, to perform a New Year's Eve concert at Walt Disney Concert Hall on December 31, 2010. She played televangelist Tammy Faye Bakker in a reading of the musical Rise in 2011.

Chenoweth played Lily Garland in a Broadway revival of On the Twentieth Century, opposite Peter Gallagher, which began previews on February 12 and opened on March 12, 2015, for a 22-week limited engagement through July 19, 2015, at the Roundabout Theatre Company. Ben Brantley of The New York Times wrote that Chenoweth "uses [her character's] histrionics to create one of the most virtuosic portraits in song ever on Broadway. The vocal vocabulary she deploys here ranges from jazz-baby brass to operatic silver, often in a single number, and she switches among them with jaw-dropping ease. And every perfectly weighted note is set off by an impeccably exaggerated gesture." She was nominated for a Tony Award and won another Drama Desk Award for her performance. In November 2023, Chenoweth made a cameo appearance in Gutenberg! The Musical! as The Producer She co-produced and stars as the title character, Jackie Siegel, in the musical The Queen of Versailles, with music and lyrics by Stephen Schwartz, which premiered at Colonial Theatre in Boston, Massachusetts, in 2024, and began performances at Broadway's St. James Theatre in October 2025.

=== Television ===
After a guest appearance on LateLine, a role in the short-lived television series Paramour (1999), and several roles in television films such as Annie (as Lily St. Regis), Chenoweth starred in her own NBC sitcom, the semi-autobiographical Kristin in 2001. Thirteen episodes were filmed, but only six aired before it was canceled. Chenoweth appeared in the lead role of Marian in the 2003 television film, The Music Man, opposite Matthew Broderick. She also guest-starred on such shows as Frasier (2001), Baby Bob (2002), Fillmore! (2003), Elmo's World and Sesame Street (several times as Mrs. Noodle) and Ugly Betty (2007).

In 2004, Chenoweth began playing the recurring role of media consultant Annabeth Schott in The West Wing. For her performance, she was nominated twice, along with the cast, for Screen Actors Guild Awards. She appeared in the final two seasons of the program through 2006. Chenoweth had been considered originally for the role of Ainsley Hayes, but she had already accepted her role in Wicked. Another of Chenoweth's Christmas-themed TV films was 12 Men of Christmas (2009); though it received lukewarm reviews, a Variety review praised Chenoweth, saying "with the right talent, it's possible to make even the moldiest of material sing just a little".

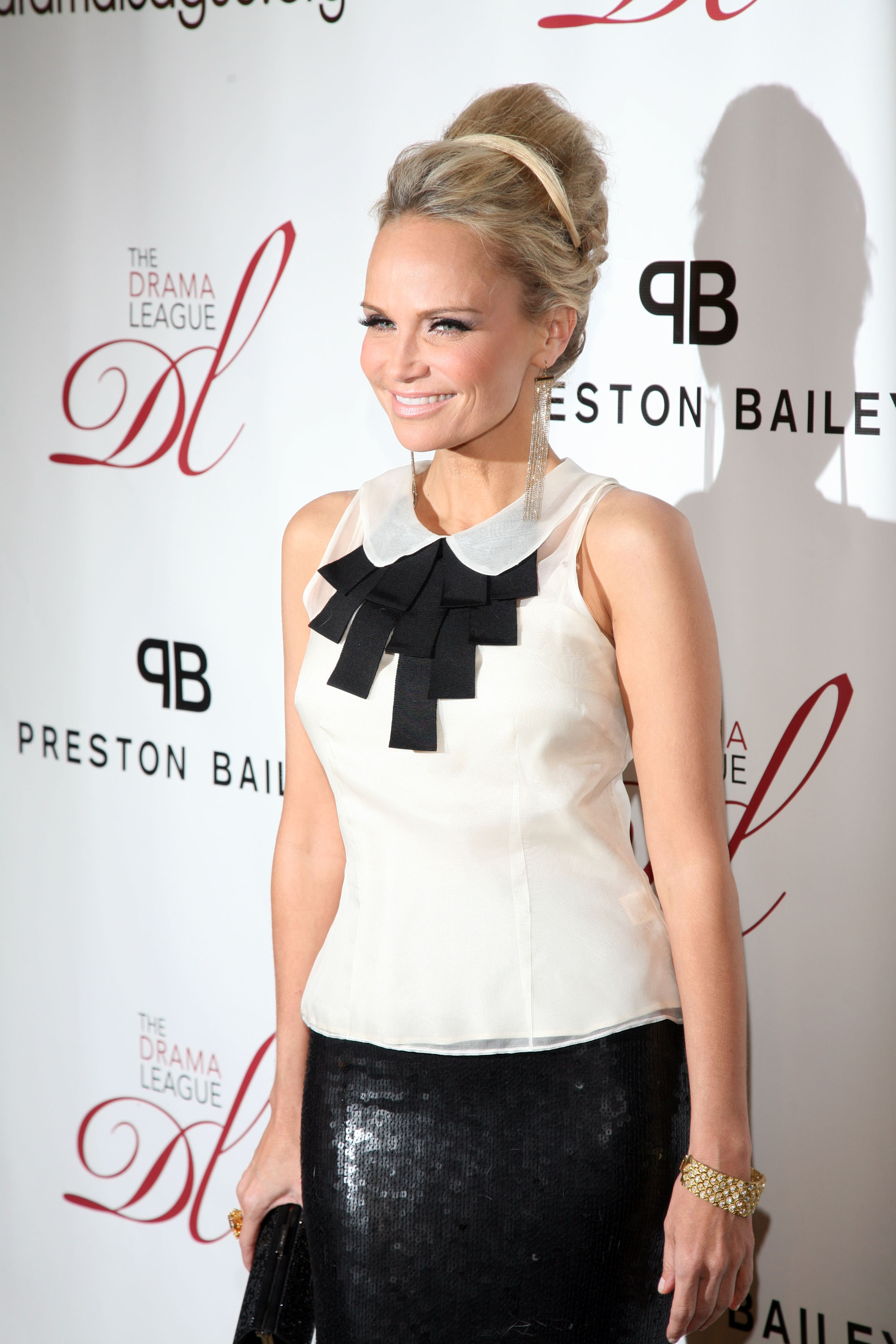
Chenoweth at the 2012 Drama League Benefit Gala

From 2007 to 2009, Chenoweth played Olive Snook in the television series, Pushing Daisies. For her performance, she "became a favorite for her musical numbers and bright personality" and was nominated two years in a row for an Emmy Award, winning in 2009 as Outstanding Supporting Actress in a Comedy Series. The series was canceled after two seasons. In 2009, Chenoweth lent her voice to the animated comedy series Sit Down, Shut Up, as Miracle Grohe, a science teacher who does not believe in science. The series lasted just thirteen episodes. Later that year, Chenoweth began a recurring role as April Rhodes in Glee, singing several songs, earning enthusiastic notices. The character is a former member of the glee club who never finished high school and ended up hitting rock bottom. A review in USA Today observed, "Her presence may not make much sense, but if it means hearing Chenoweth sing, we can put up with any explanation the show cares to offer." She received a Satellite Award for Outstanding Guest Star.

In 2010, Chenoweth returned to Glee as April Rhodes, singing more songs. The Los Angeles Times review commented, "the best part about 'Home' was undoubtedly the return of Kristin Chenoweth as April. From her spunky duet of Fire with Schue, to the heart-achingly lonely coo of 'One Less Bell to Answer' which segued into a fantastic reprise of 'A House Is Not a Home' and of course her bone-chilling take on Home I fell in love with her again." She was nominated for both 2010 and 2011 Emmy Awards for her performances on Glee. Chenoweth returned again to Glee in "Rumours" in 2011, and for its 100th episode in 2014. In 2011, Chenoweth starred in a pilot for ABC called Good Christian Bitches as Carlene Cockburn. ABC picked up the show and changed the title to GCB. The series debuted in 2012 but lasted only one season, despite "the cast's comedic wit and strong performances"; Chenoweth generally sang a song in each episode. In 2012, she guest-starred in an episode of the sitcom Hot in Cleveland, titled "The Gateway Friend".

Chenoweth played a recurring role as Peggy Byrne, a political reporter, in the fourth season of The Good Wife (2012). However, she soon left the show after sustaining a skull fracture, broken nose, spinal and rib injuries and cracked teeth when she was struck by equipment on the set. She appeared in the 2012 season opener and returned in a short scene for another episode. She later expressed regret at not pursuing legal action for her injuries, which she said caused her to endure "hundreds of doctor appointments", "head-to-toe pain on a daily basis", anxiety and depression. In 2013 and 2014, she made two appearances as Brittany Gold on the TV series, Kirstie. From 2014 to 2019 she appeared in five episodes of the animated series BoJack Horseman. Chenoweth played Maleficent in the live-action Disney Channel original movie, Descendants (2015). The Entertainment Weekly reviewer said that "Chenoweth stole much of the show". It drew the largest cable TV movie audience of 2015 to that date. later that year, Chenoweth appeared in an episode of I Get That a Lot, posing as a waitress, and co-hosted the 69th Tony Awards, for which she was nominated for another Emmy Award. Chenoweth played Velma Von Tussle in NBC's Hairspray Live! in 2016.

In 2017, Chenoweth played the role of Easter in the Starz TV series American Gods and guested on Younger In 2018, a guest spot on Mom was followed by the main cast role, on Trial & Error, of Lavinia Peck-Foster, an eccentric heiress accused of her husband's murder, who hires Josh Segal and Associates to defend her. She participated in a 2018 NBC broadcast, A Very Wicked Halloween, hosting and singing Popular and other numbers to celebrate the 15th anniversary of Wicked on Broadway. The same year, she appeared as a guest on another NBC special, Darci Lynne: My Hometown Christmas. The next year, Chenoweth made another Christmas TV movie, A Christmas Love Story. The same year, she appeared on British TV as a judge on an ITV special "All Star Musicals", where she and Elaine Paige performed the song "I Know Him So Well" together.

Chenoweth hosted a six-episode Food Network television competition show, derived from the game Candy Land, in 2020–2021. In 2021, PBS aired a Wicked concert special, hosted by Chenoweth and Menzel, with "a starry line-up" of singers and actors performing the musical numbers. She also appeared as the villainous Mildred Layton in the Apple TV+ parody musical comedy television series Schmigadoon! for which she was nominated for the 2022 Critics' Choice Television Award for Best Supporting Actress in a Comedy Series. and a Hollywood Critics Association TV Award. Later that year, she joined The Voice, season 21 as advisor to Ariana Grande's team. She returned in 2023 for season 2 of Schmigadoon!, this time as Miss Codwell, owner of an orphanage, receiving another Hollywood Critics Association TV Award nomination.

In 2025, Chenoweth played cheerleading coach Tammy Istiny in the NBC comedy series Stumble. Chenoweth is set to be a contestant on the fifth season of The Traitors on Peacock in 2027.

=== Film ===
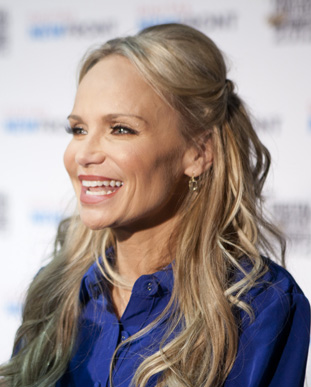
Chenoweth in 2012

Chenoweth made her theatrical film debut in Topa Topa Bluffs in 2002 playing Patty. After a few years away from film, she returned to the big screen in the 2005 film version of Bewitched, directed by Nora Ephron, as Maria Kelly. In 2006, Chenoweth played supporting roles in five films, The Pink Panther, RV, Running with Scissors, Deck the Halls and Stranger Than Fiction. On February 24, 2008, Chenoweth sang "That's How You Know" from the film Enchanted at the 80th Academy Awards in the Kodak Theatre. In animated films, she voiced "a little charmer" called Kilowatt in Space Chimps and another role, Rosetta the garden fairy, in Tinker Bell (both 2008). She also appeared in the 2008 holiday romantic comedy Four Christmases, playing the sister of Reese Witherspoon's character.

In 2009, Chenoweth starred as a "suicidal prostitute" in the indie drama Into Temptation, written and directed by Patrick Coyle. The film was screened at the Newport Beach Film Festival and was later released on DVD. Also in 2009, Chenoweth reprised her voice role of Rosetta in Tinker Bell and the Lost Treasure and Tinker Bell and the Great Fairy Rescue, and filmed the Disney comedy You Again (released in 2010). She was called "memorable" in the supporting role of Debra in the 2012 action comedy Hit and Run. She played Samatha in Family Weekend (2013). Chenoweth next voiced Gabi, a poisonous frog, in the 2014 animated film, Rio 2, and starred as Mrs. Kemp in The Opposite Sex (2014).

In 2015, she appeared in the thriller The Boy Next Door and voiced the Sugar Plum Fairy in Strange Magic and Fifi, Snoopy's love interest, in The Peanuts Movie. The next year she played Lorna Buchanan in Hard Sell. In 2017, she played Janet Krauss in Class Rank and voiced Princess Skystar in the 2017 animated My Little Pony: The Movie, and Abby the Mouse in The Star. Chenoweth headlined the Hallmark Channel's 2019 Countdown to Christmas with film A Christmas Love Story. She voiced another mouse, Daisy, in The Witches (2020) and played Bailey in National Champions (2021). She was Aunt Susan in Holidate (2020) and had cameos in the 2022 film Bros as herself, and in the 2024 film version of Wicked as a "Wiz-O-Mania" Superstar (together with Menzel), performing in the Emerald City. Chenoweth and Lindsay Lohan star in the romantic comedy Our Little Secret on Netflix, released in November 2024. She sings the end credits song, "Live Like That," in the 2025 animated film, The King of Kings.

=== Other media ===
Chenoweth often appeared on A Prairie Home Companion. On August 27, 2008, Chenoweth released an internet video with Funny or Die called Intervention with Kristin Chenoweth. The video parodied A&E's show Intervention, with Chenoweth starring as a singing, dancing interventionist. The song in the video was composed by Andrew Lippa, with lyrics by Amy Rhodes, who also wrote the script for the video. Chenoweth admitted that she was hesitant about performing the lyrics.

In 2010, she appeared in a three-minute video short for Glamour Magazine titled "iPad or Bust". She posed for the cover and a photo spread in the March 2006 edition of FHM magazine. In 2011, Chenoweth released her first televised music video on Country Music Television, directed by Roman White, for her song "I Want Somebody". The video for the single peaked at #19 on CMT's Top 20 Countdown.

In 2022, Chenoweth dipped into journalism in the mini-series Keeper of the Ashes: The Oklahoma Girl Scout Murders on Hulu. In the special, she investigates the 1977 murders of three girls at a Girl Scout camp that the young Chenoweth had been unable to attend that year due to illness. The same year, she published her first picture book, What Will I Do for My Love Today?

=== Recordings and concerts ===
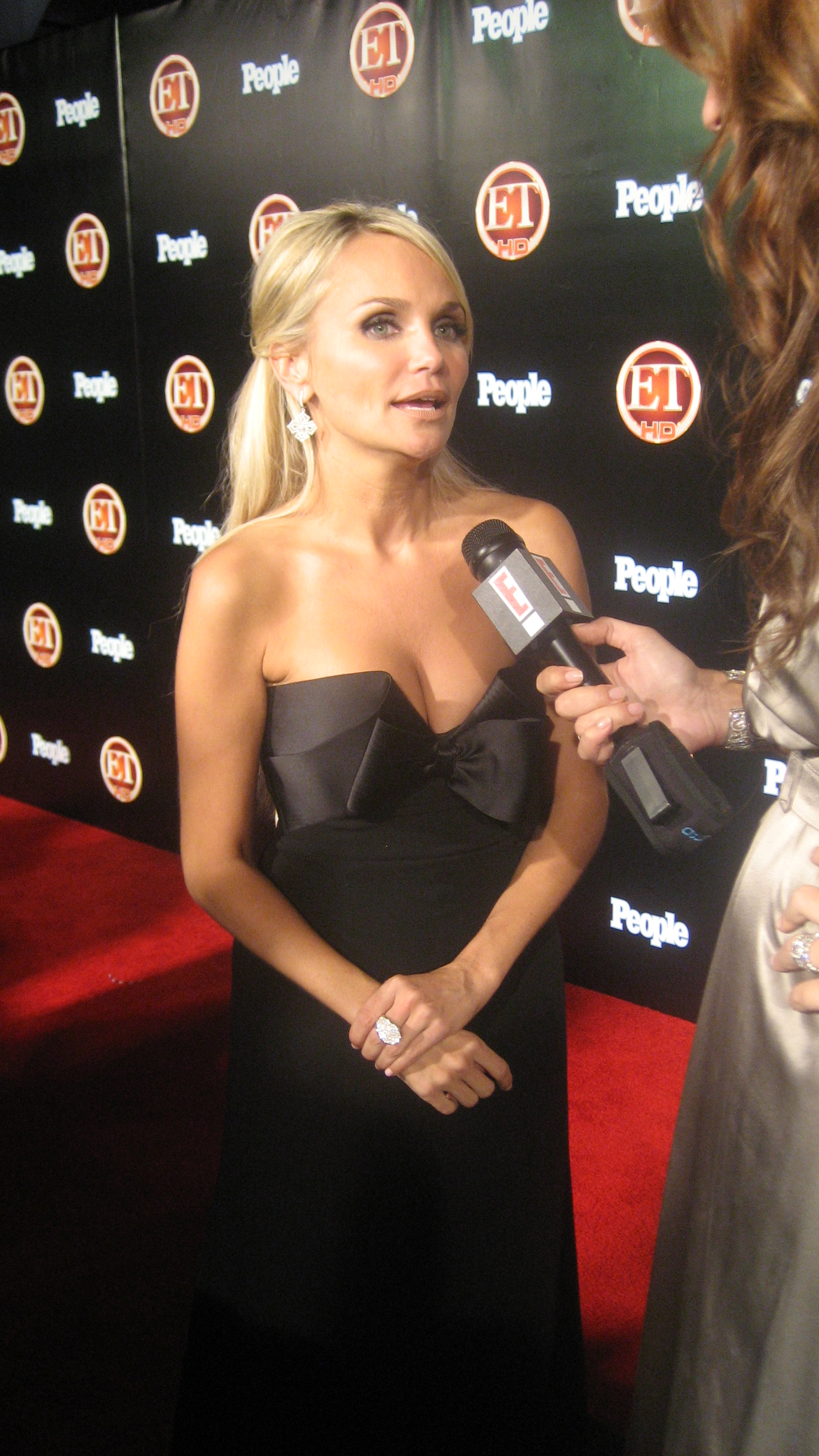
Chenoweth in 2008

Chenoweth has a distinctive speaking voice, one she has compared to that of Betty Boop. She is a classically trained coloratura soprano, able to sing the note "F6" (also known as F above High C).

Among other early recordings, Chenoweth participated in a studio cast recording of The Most Happy Fella in 1992. She was also in the cast recordings of A New Brain (1998) and You're a Good Man, Charlie Brown (1999) and a studio cast recording of 110 in the Shade (1999). In 2000, she was featured on the album Grateful: The Songs of John Bucchino. The next year, with Mandy Patinkin, she was featured on the album titled "Kidults". Also in 2001, she released her debut solo album Let Yourself Go, which was a collection of standards from the musicals of the 1930s. One of the tracks featured a duet with Jason Alexander. In October 2002, Chenoweth performed songs from the album in concert for Lincoln Center's American Songbook concert series. Ben Rimalower, in Playbill, praised the album as "a joyous affair". The same year, she appeared as Fanny Brice in the Actor's Fund Benefit Concert of the musical Funny Girl in New York City. In 2003 in London, she performed a solo concert as part of the Divas at the Donmar series for director Sam Mendes. Later that year, she sang Glinda in the cast recording of Wicked and the soundtrack recording of Disney's The Music Man. Rimalower wrote that Chenoweth "sparkles" on the album. In 2004, she released her second album As I Am, which was a Christian music album containing various spiritual songs. The album peaked at number 31 on the U.S. Christian Albums Chart. The same year, Chenoweth gave a concert at Carnegie Hall.

On January 19, 2007, Chenoweth performed a solo concert at The Metropolitan Opera in New York titled Kristin Chenoweth Live At The Met, making history as only the third musical theatre star ever to present a solo concert at that location, following Barbara Cook and Yves Montand. The same year, she was featured in songs with Nathan Gunn on an album titled Just Before Sunrise. The next year, she released her third solo studio album, titled A Lovely Way to Spend Christmas. The album included a duet with John Pizzarelli, and there are several modern holiday tunes, but many traditional carols as well, including The Lord's Prayer. This album has been her best-seller, reaching number 77 on the U.S. Billboard Albums Chart, number 7 on the U.S. Holiday Albums chart and number 1 on the U.S. Heatseekers chart. Ben Rimalower, in Playbill, observed that the album "proved an ideal showcase for [Chenoweth's] many gifts". Among many other solo concerts around the U.S., Chenoweth performed her own concert in 2009 with the St. Louis Symphony Orchestra at the Fox Theatre.

In August 2010, during her nights off from Promises, Promises, Chenoweth recorded her fourth album, a country-pop CD titled Some Lessons Learned. Released on September 13, 2011, the album contains songs by Diane Warren, Dolly Parton and Lady Antebellum's Hillary Scott, among others. Chenoweth co-wrote two of the songs. In advance of the album, Chenoweth released the song "I Want Somebody (Bitch About)". Ben Rimalower, writing in Playbill, thought that the album "may be Chenoweth's most accomplished". From the TV show GCB, in 2012, Chenoweth released "Blessed Be the Ties that Bind", "Jesus Take the Wheel", "Prayer of St. Francis" (which was also on Some Lessons Learned) and "This Little Light of Mine". Chenoweth conducted her first U.S. concert tour in the summer of 2012. The reviewer for BroadwayWorld.com wrote: "Kristin shines on stage."

Less than four months after her July 2012 injury on the set of The Good Wife, Chenoweth returned to the concert stage for a short series of dates in California, where she performed "a sagely programmed 90-minute set, which merged pop, Broadway, gospel and country with perky, unforced-feeling remarks. Chenoweth's range, timbre and versatility are in peak form, with astonishing top notes, equalized registers and a delicious ability to variegate attack from number to number." In 2013, Chenoweth performed at the Sydney Opera House as part of an Australian concert tour. In 2014, Chenoweth returned to Carnegie Hall with an autobiographical concert, The Evolution of a Soprano, where she sang "as good a rendition of 'Much More' as we're ever likely to hear". She also made her London solo concert debut at the Royal Albert Hall, where a reviewer's five-star review noted: "Chenoweth undeniably knows how to engulf a venue, not only with her (sometimes surprisingly) powerful, operatic voice but also with her irresistible personality that audience was in the palm of her hands for the duration of the evening". She joined Andrew Lippa in his oratorio I Am Harvey Milk at Avery Fisher Hall on October 6, 2014.

In 2014, Chenoweth released an album titled Coming Home. The album charted at No. 48 on the Billboard 200 chart. Her Coming Home Tour continued into 2017. Chenoweth released her next album, The Art of Elegance, in 2016, which debuted at No. 36 on the Billboard 200 and No. 1 on the Billboard Jazz Albums chart. One of the songs on the album, "I'm a Fool to Want You", was nominated for a Grammy Award for its arrangements. She gave a series of concerts at Broadway's Lunt-Fontanne Theatre, titled My Love Letter to Broadway, in 2016. In 2017, she gave a concert at the London Palladium, where she "put on a spectacular show and simultaneously formed a heartfelt connection with her fans."

Chenoweth released the album For the Girls on September 27, 2019, which features covers of songs by female performers from various genres that have influenced her. She collaborated with Dolly Parton, Reba McEntire, Jennifer Hudson and Ariana Grande on the album. In support of the album, she presented a concert series titled Kristin Chenoweth: For the Girls at the Nederlander Theatre from November 8 to 17, 2019. She released a second holiday album, Happiness Is Christmas, in October 2021, and returned to the Metropolitan Opera House with a new program, Christmas at the Met, on December 13, 2021, to promote the album.

== Special events and appearances ==
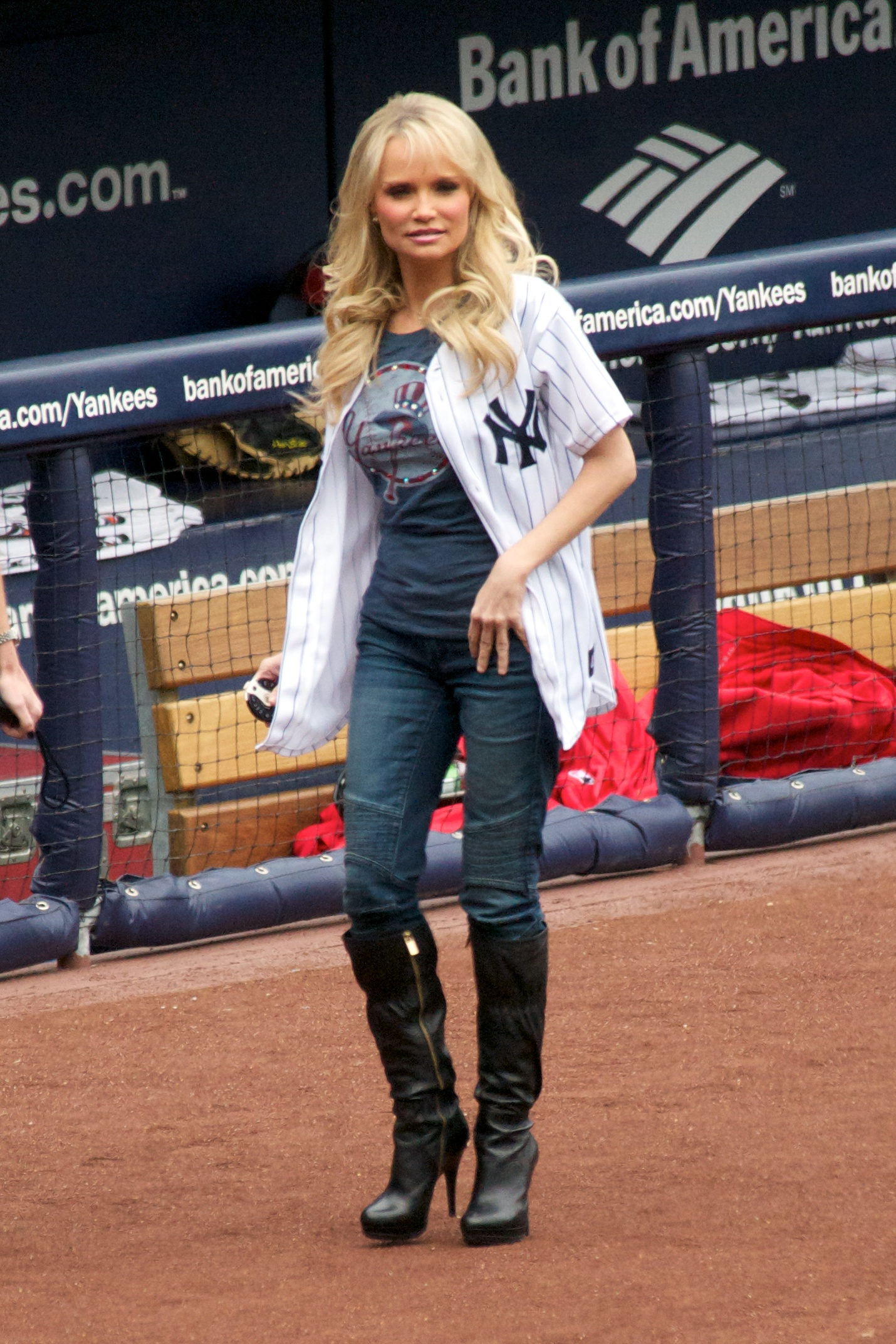
Chenoweth sang the U.S. national anthem for the Yankees' home opener in 2010.

Chenoweth and the cast of the Broadway musical Wicked performed the song "One Short Day" in the 2003 Macy's Thanksgiving Day Parade. At the 2005 Macy's Thanksgiving Day Parade, Chenoweth performed the song "Oklahoma" while riding aboard the "Oklahoma Rising" float. The float was making the first of three annual appearances commemorating the state of Oklahoma's statehood centennial in 2007. She was the star performer of the opening ceremony of the 2007 Tournament of Roses Parade. She sang "Our Good Nature", an original composition written to coincide with the Oklahoma centennial celebration and the theme of the parade. In the 2008 Macy's Thanksgiving Day Parade, she performed the song "The Christmas Waltz" from her "A Lovely Way to Spend Christmas" album while riding aboard the "Care Bears Winter Fun-Derland" float.

She sang with Il Divo as part of Il Divo's Christmas Tour on December 15, 16 and 17, 2009, in New York City and December 18 in Boston. She has sung the U.S. national anthem at various sporting events, including the 2010 New York Yankees home opener, at Candlestick Park for the NFL's NFC Conference Championship on January 22, 2012, at the Arizona Cardinals' season opener in 2016 and their game at University of Phoenix Stadium against the Seattle Seahawks on November 9, 2017. Also in 2010, Chenoweth hosted the 15th Annual Broadcast Film Critics Association Awards on VH1.

In 2013, Chenoweth co-hosted the Oscars Red Carpet Live immediately prior to the 85th Academy Awards and also sang the closing number of the ceremony, "Here's to the Losers", with host Seth MacFarlane, in which, paraphrasing the original Frank Sinatra song, the two poked genial fun at nominees who had not received awards. Chenoweth was the solo performer in the Live from Lincoln Center feature "The Dames of Broadway... All of 'Em!!!" In July, she hosted the fifth Just For Laughs gala in Montreal. She also appeared in the 2013 Macy's Thanksgiving Day Parade performing the song "New York, New York" while riding aboard Royal Caribbean's "A World at Sea" float.

In 2015, she co-hosted the Tony Awards. She appeared as a guest with Andrea Bocelli on some of his 2017–2018 American tour stops. In December 2018, Chenoweth performed with and narrated the Tabernacle Choir's yearly Christmas concert series in Salt Lake City, Utah.

In 2025, she performed the U.S. national anthem at Game 7 of the 2025 NBA Finals at the Paycom Center in Oklahoma City, Oklahoma.

== Personal life ==
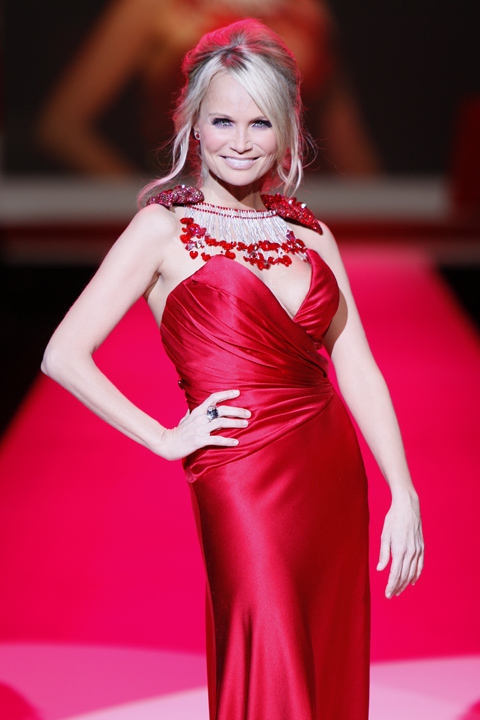
Chenoweth at The Heart Truth in 2010

In 2009, Chenoweth published a memoir, A Little Bit Wicked: Life, Love, and Faith in Stages, describing her life and career, including her adoption, her turn in Wicked and her time in Hollywood. Chenoweth suffers from Ménière's disease, an inner-ear disorder that can cause vertigo, headaches and nausea, among other symptoms. She has said that during some performances, she leaned on her co-stars to keep her balance, and that it has caused her to miss performances.

Chenoweth has spoken publicly about her religious faith; she describes herself as a "non-judgmental, liberal Christian". According to The New York Times, when Chenoweth "assured her theater fans that she supports gay rights, her Christian base was outraged; she was disinvited from performing at a Women of Faith conference in September 2005". Chenoweth released an album in April 2005, As I Am, a mixture of hymns and contemporary Christian music, with adult contemporary arrangements. To promote the album, she made an appearance on The 700 Club, which upset some of her gay fans. She later said she thought that the "Pat Robertsons and Jerry Falwells of the world are scary" and that she regretted appearing on the show.

In May 2010, Chenoweth wrote in response to an article in Newsweek by Ramin Setoodeh, an openly gay writer. Setoodeh thought that her Tony-nominated Promises, Promises co-star, Sean Hayes, "comes off as wooden and insincere" in playing the straight character Chuck and that Jonathan Groff has a similar credibility problem in the TV show Glee. He questioned whether any openly gay actor could acceptably portray a straight character. Chenoweth called the article "horrendously homophobic" and criticized Setoodeh's view as rationalizing "the same kind of bullying" that gay youths face in high school. Chenoweth argued that audiences "come to the theater to go on a journey" and do not care about an actor's sexual orientation. The story was discussed in media including The New York Times and the Los Angeles Times.

Chenoweth endorsed Hillary Clinton in the 2016 United States presidential election and was one of many celebrities who sang an arrangement of "Fight Song" in a music video made for the 2016 Democratic National Convention.

Chenoweth has dated several men in Hollywood, including producer Dana Brunetti, actors Seth Green, Lane Garrison and Marc Kudisch (to whom she was engaged from 1998 to 2001), and producer/writer Aaron Sorkin. In Sorkin's Studio 60 on the Sunset Strip, the character of the Christian Harriet Hayes bears significant resemblances to Chenoweth, and the relationship between Hayes and "East coast liberal Jewish atheist" (Hayes' description) Matt Albie is modeled after that of Chenoweth and Sorkin. For example, Chenoweth's decision to appear on The 700 Club and her falling out with Women of Faith were depicted with the Hayes character. In 2018, Chenoweth began dating Josh Bryant, the guitarist for country band Backroad Anthem. They became engaged in 2021 and were married on September 2, 2023.

== Discography ==
=== Studio albums ===
List of albums, with selected chart positions
Title	Album details	Peak chart positions				
Title	Album details	US	US Christian	US Holiday	US Country	US Jazz
Let Yourself Go	Released: May 29, 2001; Label: Sony Music Entertainment (#89384); Format: CD, digital download	—	—	—	—	—
As I Am	Released: April 5, 2005; Label: Sony Music Entertainment (#94384); Format: CD, digital download	—	31	—	—	—
A Lovely Way to Spend Christmas	Released: October 14, 2008; Label: Sony Masterworks (#8869734256); Format: CD, digital download	77	—	7	—	—
Some Lessons Learned	Released: September 13, 2011; Label: Sony Masterworks; Format: CD, digital download	50	—	—	14	—
Coming Home	Released: November 17, 2014; Label: Concord; Format: CD, digital download	48	—	—	—	—
The Art of Elegance	Released: September 23, 2016; Label: Concord; Format: CD, digital download	36	—	—	—	1
For the Girls	Released: September 27, 2019; Label: Concord; Format: CD, digital download, streaming, vinyl	68	—	—	—	—
Happiness Is...Christmas!	Released: October 22, 2021; Label: Concord; Format: CD, digital download, streaming, vinyl	—	—	17	—	—
"—" denotes releases that did not chart.

=== Singles ===
List of Chenoweth's singles that have charted, with chart positions
Title	Year	Peak chart positions					Album
Title	Year	US	AUS	CAN	IRL	UK	Album
"Maybe This Time" (Glee Cast featuring Kristin Chenoweth)	2009	88	100	— (Note: "Maybe This Time" did not enter the Canadian Hot 100, but did peak at number 65 on the Hot Canadian Digital Song Sales chart.)	—	87	Glee: The Music, Volume 1
"Alone" (Glee Cast featuring Kristin Chenoweth)	2009	51	94	58	25	47	Glee: The Music, Volume 1
"Last Name" (Glee Cast featuring Kristin Chenoweth)	2009	—	—	—	44	83	Glee: The Music, The Complete Season One
"Fire" (Glee Cast featuring Kristin Chenoweth)	2010	64	—	52	—	93	Glee: The Music, The Complete Season One
"One Less Bell to Answer / A House Is Not a Home" (Glee Cast featuring Kristin Chenoweth)	2010	53	—	63	—	77	Glee: The Music, Volume 3 Showstoppers
"Home" (Glee Cast featuring Kristin Chenoweth)	2010	90	—	92	—	116	Glee: The Music, Volume 3 Showstoppers
"Dreams" (Glee Cast featuring Kristin Chenoweth)	2011	92	—	— (Note: "Dreams" did not enter the Canadian Hot 100, but did peak at number 69 on the Hot Canadian Digital Song Sales chart.)	—	—	Glee: The Music, Volume 6
"—" denotes a release that did not chart.

=== Other charted songs ===
Title	Year	Peak chart positions			Certifications	Album
Title	Year	US Bub.	NZ Hot	UK Sales	Certifications	Album
"Popular"	2003	—	—	—	BPI: Silver	Wicked
"Defying Gravity" (with Idina Menzel)	2003	—	—	86	BPI: Platinum	Wicked
"Evil Like Me" (with Dove Cameron)	2015	12	—	—	RIAA: Gold	Descendants
"One Short Day" (with Cynthia Erivo, Ariana Grande and Idina Menzel featuring Michael McCorry Rose)	2024	14	—	—		Wicked: The Soundtrack
"For Good" (Live from the Gershwin Theatre) (with Cynthia Erivo, Ariana Grande and Idina Menzel)	2025	—	37	—		Wicked: One Wonderful Night
"—" denotes a release that did not chart.

== Awards and honors ==
Chenoweth was awarded an honorary doctorate in Performing Arts from the University of North Carolina School of the Arts in 2009, where she was the commencement speaker. Oklahoma City University, where she received her undergraduate and master's degrees, awarded her an honorary Doctor of Humane Letters degree in 2013. In 2010, Chenoweth was inducted into the Oklahoma Hall of Fame. In 2011, she won the GLAAD Vanguard Award.

In 2012, the Broken Arrow Performing Arts Center named its theatre the Kristin Chenoweth Theatre. Chenoweth received a star on the Hollywood Walk of Fame in 2015. In 2015, she was inducted as an honorary member of the Sigma Alpha Iota music fraternity's Sigma Theta chapter at Eastman School of Music.

Theatre
Year	Award	Category	Nominated work	Result	Ref.
1997	Theatre World Awards	Outstanding Broadway Debut	Steel Pier	Won	
1999	Tony Awards	Best Featured Actress in a Musical	You're a Good Man, Charlie Brown	Won	
1999	Drama Desk Awards	Outstanding Featured Actress in a Musical	You're a Good Man, Charlie Brown	Won	
1999	Outer Critics Circle Award	Outstanding Featured Actress in a Musical	You're a Good Man, Charlie Brown	Won	
2004	Tony Awards	Best Actress in a Musical	Wicked	Nominated	
2004	Outer Critics Circle Award	Outstanding Actress in a Musical	Wicked	Nominated	
2004	Drama Desk Awards	Outstanding Actress in a Musical	Wicked	Nominated	
2007	Drama Desk Awards	Outstanding Actress in a Musical	The Apple Tree	Nominated	
2007	Outer Critics Circle Award	Outstanding Actress in a Musical	The Apple Tree	Nominated	
2015	Tony Awards	Best Actress in a Musical	On the Twentieth Century	Nominated	
2015	Drama Desk Awards	Outstanding Actress in a Musical	On the Twentieth Century	Won	
2015	Outer Critics Circle Award	Outstanding Actress in a Musical	On the Twentieth Century	Won	

Television and film
Award	Year	Work	Category	Result	Ref.
The Astra Awards	2024	Schmigadoon!	Best Supporting Actress in a Streaming Comedy Series	Nominated	
Critics' Choice Television Awards	2022	Schmigadoon!	Best Supporting Actress in a Comedy Series	Nominated	
Gracie Awards	2017	Hairspray Live!	Best Ensemble Cast	Won	
Hollywood Critics Association TV Awards	2022	Schmigadoon!	Best Supporting Actress in a Streaming Series, Comedy	Nominated	
Hollywood Critics Association TV Awards	2023	Schmigadoon!	Best Supporting Actress in a Streaming Series, Comedy	Nominated	
MTV Movie Awards	2017	Best Musical Moment	"You Can't Stop the Beat" (from Hairspray Live!)	Nominated	
Primetime Emmy Awards	2008	Pushing Daisies	Outstanding Supporting Actress in a Comedy Series	Nominated	
Primetime Emmy Awards	2009	Pushing Daisies	Outstanding Supporting Actress in a Comedy Series	Won	
Primetime Emmy Awards	2010	Glee	Outstanding Guest Actress in a Comedy Series	Nominated	
Primetime Emmy Awards	2011	Glee	Outstanding Guest Actress in a Comedy Series	Nominated	
Primetime Emmy Awards	2016	69th Tony Awards (as host)	Outstanding Special Class Program	Nominated	
People's Choice Awards	2012	Glee	Best TV Guest Star	Nominated	
Satellite Awards	2008	Pushing Daisies	Best Supporting Actress in a TV Series, Mini-Series or TV Movie	Nominated	
Satellite Awards	2009	Glee	Outstanding Guest Star	Won	
Screen Actors Guild	2005	The West Wing	Outstanding Performance by an Ensemble in a Drama Series	Nominated	
Screen Actors Guild	2006	The West Wing	Outstanding Performance by an Ensemble in a Drama Series	Nominated	

== Sources ==
- Chenoweth, Kristin and Joni Rodgers (2009). A Little Bit Wicked: Life, Love, and Faith in Stages. Simon and Schuster. ISBN 978-1416580553.
- Chenoweth, Kristin (2023). I'm No Philosopher, But I Got Thoughts: Mini Meditations for Saints, Sinners and the Rest of Us. Harper Celebrate. ISBN 978-1-4002-2851-5.
- Marill, Alvin H. (December 8, 2004). Mickey Rooney: His Films, Television Appearances, Radio Work, Stage Shows, and Recordings. McFarland & Co. ISBN 978-0786420155.
