= Some Lessons Learned =

Studio album by Kristin Chenoweth
- Released: September 13, 2011
- Recorded: August, 2010–2011
- Genre: Country pop
- Length: 45:11
- Labels: Sony Music Entertainment, Masterworks
- Producer: Bob Ezrin

Kristin Chenoweth chronology
A Lovely Way to Spend Christmas (2008)	Some Lessons Learned (2011)	Coming Home (2014)

Singles from Some Lessons Learned
- 1. "I Want Somebody (Bitch About)" Released: June 6, 2011; 2. "Lessons Learned" Released: September 7, 2011

Professional ratings
Review scores
Source	Rating
Allmusic	3.5/5 stars

Some Lessons Learned is the fourth album by singer and actress Kristin Chenoweth.

== Overview ==
The country pop disc was released on September 13, 2011. The lead single, "I Want Somebody (Bitch About)" was released on May 31, 2011. The album contains songs by Diane Warren, Dolly Parton and Lady Antebellum's Hillary Scott, among others. Chenoweth co-wrote two of the songs, including one entitled "What Would Dolly Do". "Lessons Learned" was previously recorded by Carrie Underwood for her debut album, Some Hearts. The album is produced by popular music producer and Canadian Music Hall of Fame entree, Bob Ezrin. She recorded it in Nashville, Tennessee in the summer of 2011. An MP3 release was also made available on September 13, 2011. She has said the album is about learning from life lessons. Chenoweth made her Grand Ole Opry debut during the promotion of the album.

== Track listing ==
No.	Title	Writer(s)	Length
1.	"I Was Here"	Victoria Shaw, Gary Burr, Hillary Scott	3:36
2.	"I Want Somebody (Bitch About)"	Diane Warren	3:10
3.	"Fathers and Daughters"	Jodi Marr, Tom Douglas	3:13
4.	"What Would Dolly Do"	Kristin Chenoweth, Desmond Child, Shane McAnally, Bob Ezrin	2:46
5.	"God and Me"	Shaw, Burr	2:58
6.	"Change"	Dolly Parton	3:16
7.	"What More Do You Want"	Burr, Caroline Cutbirth, Mark Mirando	3:23
8.	"Wreck You"	Warren	3:48
9.	"I Didn't"	Sherrié Austin, Will Rambeaux, Steve Williams	2:43
10.	"Borrowed Angels"	Warren	4:03
11.	"What If We Never"	Warren	3:37
12.	"Mine to Love"	Chenoweth, Child, Eric Bazilian	4:11
13.	"Lessons Learned"	Warren	4:16

iTunes Store Bonus Tracks
No.	Title	Writer(s)	Length
14.	"Boy"		3:43
15.	"The Making of Some Lessons Learned (Video)"
16.	"I Want Somebody (Bitch About) [Video]"	Diane Warren
17.	"Lessons Learned (Video)"	Diane Warren

Target Bonus Tracks
No.	Title	Writer(s)	Length
14.	"Higher Love"
15.	"Prayer of St. Francis" (featuring Vince Gill on guitar)	Traditional

== Chart performance ==
Chart (2011)	Peak position
US Billboard Top Country Albums	14
US Billboard 200	50
