= Kristin Chenoweth Live at Walt Disney Concert Hall =

- Concert by Kristin Chenoweth
- Venue: Walt Disney Concert Hall, Los Angeles
- Date(s): February 26, 2006
- No. of shows: 1

Kristin Chenoweth concert chronology
- Kristin Chenoweth at Carnegie Hall (2004); Kristin Chenoweth Live at Walt Disney Concert Hall (2006); Kristin Chenoweth Live at the Met (2007)

Kristin Chenoweth Live at Walt Disney Concert Hall was a concert by American singer and actress Kristin Chenoweth at the Walt Disney Concert Hall in Los Angeles, California, on February 26, 2006. The sold-out concert was Chenoweth's debut in the newly opened venue.

Chenoweth headlined the concert following her Broadway success in Wicked, after which she began appearing in various film and television projects including Bewitched, The Pink Panther, RV, and a recurring role on NBC's hit series The West Wing. She also became the 2005–2006 spokesperson for Old Navy, which sponsored the one night only Disney Hall concert. The concert featured a 13-piece orchestra conducted by Andrew Lippa. Chenoweth was joined on stage by two dancers, Seán Martin Hingston and David Elder, along with special guest Alanis Morissette.

== Setlist ==
Act One

1. "Should I Be Sweet" from Take a Chance
2. "A Girl Like Me" by Andrew Lippa
3. "Popular" from Wicked
4. Jerome Kern Medley, (featuring "Bill", "Why Was I Born" and "Nobody Else But Me")
5. "Going to the Dance with You"
6. "How Can I Lose You" from Myths and Hymns by Adam Guettel
7. "Hard Times Come Again No More" by Stephen Foster
8. "If You Hadn't, But You Did" from Two on the Aisle

Act Two

1. "The Girl in 14G" by Jeanine Tesori and Dick Scanlan
2. "You've Got Possibilities" from It's a Bird... It's a Plane... It's Superman
3. "When I First Met Him" from Andrew Lippa's The Wild Party
4. "Ah, Leave Me Not to Pine" from The Pirates of Penzance / "My White Knight" from The Music Man
5. "Taylor the Latte Boy" by Marcy Heisler and Zina Goldrich
6. "For Good" from Wicked (duet with Alanis Morissette)
7. "Show Me the Way" by Dennis DeYoung

Encores

1. "Glitter and Be Gay" from Candide
2. "You'll Never Know" from ''Hello, Frisco, Hello
