= Kristin Chenoweth at Carnegie Hall =

- Concert by Kristin Chenoweth
- Venue: Carnegie Hall, New York City
- Date(s): September 10, 2004
- No. of shows: 1

Kristin Chenoweth concert chronology
- Kristin Chenoweth at Carnegie Hall 2004; Kristin Chenoweth Live at Walt Disney Concert Hall 2006

Kristin Chenoweth at Carnegie Hall was a concert by American singer and actress Kristin Chenoweth in the Isaac Stern Auditorium at Carnegie Hall in New York City on September 10, 2004. The sold-out concert was Chenoweth's debut in the landmark venue as a solo act.

Chenoweth headlined the one-night-only concert two months after leaving the role of Glinda on Broadway in Wicked. The concert featured a 13-piece orchestra conducted by Andrew Lippa. Chenoweth was joined on stage by two dancers, Seán Martin Hingston and David Elder. Andrew Gans, in Playbill, praised Chenoweth as an interpreter of lyrics, as well as the range, agility and beauty of her voice, writing: "With a voice that easily glides from Broadway belt to soaring soprano, Chenoweth ... delighted the crowd with an evening that featured classic tunes as well as works by 14 living songwriters. ...[Chenoweth,] arguably the most gifted comedic musical-theatre singer-actress of her generation, drew laughs from most everything she said during the two-hour evening."

Chenoweth returned to Carnegie Hall for two later concerts that also sold out: in 2005 she performed alongside the Cincinnati Pops Orchestra, and in 2014 she presented "The Evolution of a Soprano".

== Setlist ==
Act One

1. "A Girl Like Me" by Andrew Lippa
2. "Parsley" by Paul Loesel and Scott Brukell
3. "Daddy" by Bobby Troup
4. Jerome Kern Medley, (featuring "Bill", "Why Was I Born", and "Nobody Else But Me")
5. "Goin' to the Dance With You" by Richard Dworsky
6. "Boy" by Jodi Marr
7. "Taylor the Latte Boy" by Marcy Heisler and Zina Goldrich
8. "If You Hadn't, But You Did" from Two on the Aisle

Act Two

1. "Spread a Little Joy" by Andrew Lippa
2. "The Girl In 14G" by Jeanine Tesori and Dick Scanlan
3. "Popular" from Wicked
4. "Borrowed Angels" by Diane Warren
5. "Fasto" by Jonathan Brooke
6. "Hard Times Come Again No More" by Stephen Foster

Encores

1. "Glitter and Be Gay" from Candide
2. "A Ride Home" (original song by Chenoweth)
3. "Till There Was You" from The Music Man
