= Kristin Chenoweth Live at the Met =

- Concert by Kristin Chenoweth
- Venue: Metropolitan Opera, New York City
- Date(s): January 19, 2007
- No. of shows: 1

Kristin Chenoweth concert chronology
- Kristin Chenoweth Live at Walt Disney Concert Hall (2006); Kristin Chenoweth Live at the Met (2007); Kristin Chenoweth in Concert (2012)

Kristin Chenoweth Live at the Met was a concert by American singer and actress Kristin Chenoweth at the Metropolitan Opera House at Lincoln Center in New York City on January 19, 2007. The concert was sold out, and critics praised Chenoweth's "soprano of crystalline clarity", vivacious humor and "acting range".

Chenoweth headlined the one-night-only concert during her break from performing in the Roundabout Theatre Company's 2006 revival of The Apple Tree. She was only the third musical theatre actor ever to present a solo concert at the Met, following Barbara Cook and Yves Montand. The concert was directed by Kathleen Marshall and featured a 12-piece orchestra conducted by Andrew Lippa. Chenoweth performed a diverse selection of musical theatre, light opera, pop, country and fan favorites. She was joined on stage by two dancers, Seán Martin Hingston and David Elder, and the Juilliard Choral Union (JCU).

== Setlist ==
Act One: Things You Want

1. "Overture", arranged by Andrew Lippa (contains elements from "My New Philosophy")
2. "Gorgeous" from The Apple Tree
3. "Popular" from Wicked
4. "Goin' to the Dance With You" by Richard Dworsky
5. "Boy" by Jodi Marr
6. "If You Hadn't, But You Did" from Two on the Aisle
7. "Taylor the Latte Boy" by Marcy Heisler and Zina Goldrich
8. "You're Easy to Dance With" by Irving Berlin
9. "The Girl in 14G" by Jeanine Tesori and Dick Scanlan

Act Two: Things You Need

1. "Italian Street Song" from Naughty Marietta (with JCU)
2. Gilbert and Sullivan medley (featuring "The Sun Whose Rays Are All Ablaze", "Ah, Leave Me Not to Pine", and "Poor Wand'ring One")
3. "Love Somebody Now" by Andrew Lippa
4. "How Can I Lose You" from Myths and Hymns by Adam Guettel
5. "Run Away" by Ricky Ian Gordon
6. "Hard Times Come Again No More" by Stephen Foster (with JCU)
7. "Show Me the Way" by Dennis DeYoung (with JCU)

Encores

1. "Glitter and Be Gay" from Candide
2. "What Makes Me Love Him" from The Apple Tree

== Christmas at the Met: 2021 ==
14 years later, Chenoweth returned to the Met with a new program, Christmas at the Met, on December 13, 2021, to promote her second holiday album Happiness Is...Christmas! The program mixed numbers from that album with holiday songs. She was joined onstage by Keb' Mo' and Cecily Strong for duets, by Mount Sinai health care workers, all supported by her backup singers and music director Mary-Mitchell Campbell.

=== 2021 Setlist ===
Act One

1. "Christmas Time Is Here" / "The Man With the Bag" / "Jingle Bell Rock"
2. "New York City & the Rest of the World"
3. "Angels Among Us"
4. "Mary Did You Know?" with J. Harrison Ghee
5. "O Holy Night"
6. "I'm Not A Diva"
7. "Merry Christmas Baby" with Keb' Mo'
8. "Please Come Home For Christmas" (solo by Keb' Mo')
9. "Till There Was You" from The Music Man
10. "Happiness" from You're a Good Man, Charlie Brown
11. "Sing"
12. "Bring Him Home" from Les Misérables

Act Two

1. "We Are Lights"
2. "I've Got a Bone to Pick With You"
3. "Moon River"
4. "Love Somebody Now" by Andrew Lippa
5. "Baby It Sucks Outside" with Cecily Strong
6. "Merry Christmas Darlin'"
7. "Green Finch and Linnett Bird" from Sweeney Todd
8. "Always on My Mind" / "Losing My Mind" from Follies
9. "The Little Road to Bethlehem"
10. "Why Couldn't It Be Christmas, Every Day"

Encore

1. "My Dear Acquaintance"
