= Amir Gross Kabiri =

Israeli businessman, investor, art collector, publisher

- אמיר גרוס כבירי
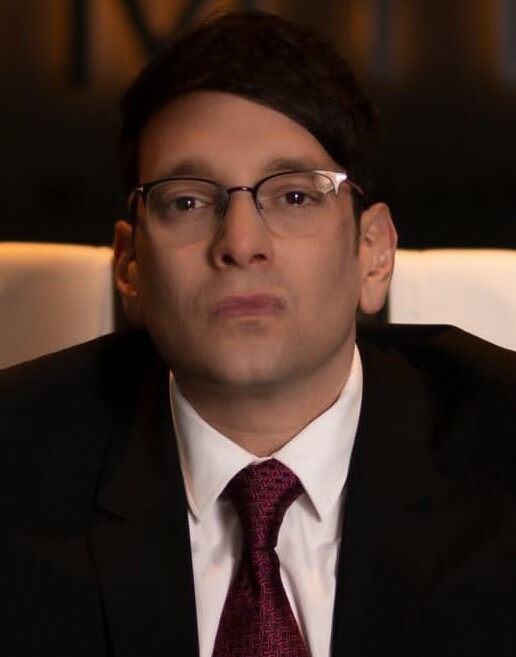
- Kabiri (March 2022)
- Born: 29 August 1980 (age 45); Tel Aviv, Israel
- Occupations: Entrepreneur, Industrialist, Publisher
- Known for: Chairman of M.T. Abraham Group, CEO of Aluminij Industries d.o.o., President of The Hermitage Museum Foundation Israel, Vice President of HŠK Zrinjski Mostar
- Title: Chairman, President, CEO
- Awards: Večernji List Man of the year in Economy, 2022

Amir Gross Kabiri (Hebrew: אמיר גרוס כבירי; born 29 August 1980) is an Israeli businessman, industrialist, publisher, and art collector. He is the chairman of the M.T. Abraham Group, CEO of Aluminij Industries, and best known as the owner of The Art Newspaper Israel, President of the M.T. Abraham Foundation, Member at the Board of Patrons of the Conference of European Rabbis, and the President of the Hermitage Museum Foundation Israel.

Kabiri is also a vice president of the HŠK Zrinjski Mostar football club, President of the Chamber of Commerce of the State of Israel in Bosnia and Herzegovina, and Head of the Jewish Community of Mostar.

== Early life ==
Kabiri was born on 29 August 1980. He attended Ironi Daled high school in Tel Aviv, Israel from 1992 to 1998, where he majored in Business administration and Managerial economics.

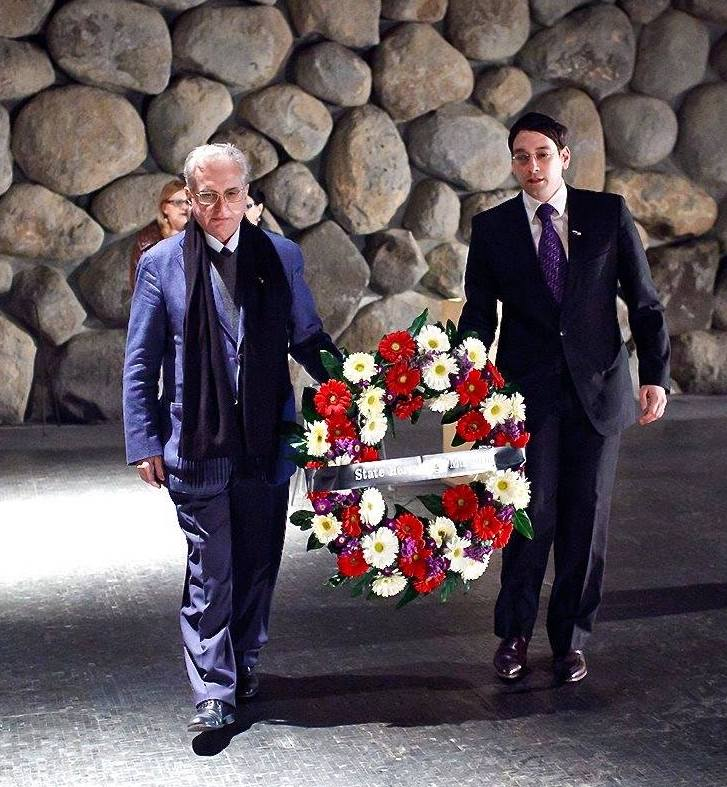
Yad Vashem, Jerusalem 2013

== Business career ==
=== Aluminium ===
In the year 2020, he became the owner of Aluminij Industries, an aluminium manufacturing company, with annual revenue of $263 million (USD). The company is the largest exporter and importer of BiH. Aluminij Industries currently employs 350 people, making it one of the largest employers of the region. In December 2021, Aluminij Industries and Glencore International AG signed a two-year contract for the supply of 300,000 tons of primary remelt aluminium.

=== Energy ===
In April 2022, M.T. Abraham Group announced an investment of €32 million in electricity production using solar power. It was reported that once operational, solar power station would produce more than 68,000 MWh annually.

=== Aviation ===
In August 2022, Kabiri was in negotiations with the Municipality of Mostar to take over the Mostar airport, which is the third largest airport in BiH.

== Philanthropic and community activities ==
=== Hub of Fine Arts ===
In May 2022, Mr. Kabiri opened his own museum space, named "Hub of Fine Arts" in the Balkans. The works of art on display at The Hub of Fine Arts represent the first half of the 20th century and the artists of that time period.

=== State Hermitage Museum ===
Mr. Kabiri became Chairman of the M.T. Abraham Group in 2004, and was appointed as the President of the M.T. Abraham Foundation during the same year. He oversaw the exhibition of 74 Edgar Degas statues in museums such as the Tel Aviv Art Museum, the Valencian Institute of Modern Art, and the State Hermitage Museum.

In 2012, he organized the "Posthumous Bronzes in Law and Art History" international colloquium at the State Hermitage Museum.

In the same year, Prof. Mikhail B. Piotrovsky, Director of the State Hermitage Museum in St. Petersburg, appointed Kabiri to head the Hermitage Museum Foundation in Israel, whose main objective is supporting "The State Hermitage Museum in its artistic, scientific, cultural and diplomatic activities".

In the year 2014, as part of the State Hermitage Museum 250th anniversary, with the collaboration of the Israeli Foreign Ministry, Mr. Kabiri oversaw and sponsored the "Dada and Surrealism" exhibition from the Israel Museum.

In the same year, he collaborated with the Israeli Antiquities Authority, in bringing the "Lod Mosaic", a series of Roman mosaic floors of exceptional quality dated to about A.D. 300, to the State Hermitage Museum. As part of the State Hermitage Museum's 250th anniversary events in Israel, the President of the State of Israel, Mr. Reuven Rivlin, blessed the Hermitage Museum Foundation Israel headed by Mr. Kabiri for its activities and role in improving the cultural and diplomatic relations between Russia and Israel.

Additionally, Mr. Kabiri’s foundation also pledged their Edgar Degas collection to the State Hermitage Museum for an exhibition titled "Edgar Degas-Figures in Motion". The entire 74 bronze sculptures collection, which is part of the M.T. Abraham Foundation collection, was on loan to the State Hermitage Museum for two years.

Through the Hermitage Museum Foundation Israel, Kabiri supported the exhibition titled "Memory of Bitola 2019", which debuted at the Israeli Ministry of Foreign Affairs on June 30, 2019.

=== Art Pledges ===
In 2010 he donated a historical publication to the Yad Vashem Library: Adolf Hitler Album, from 1936. He also raised funds for the "Healing through Art" project at the Tel Aviv Museum of Art in 2011.

In June 2019, he pledged a donation from his art collection to the State Hermitage Museum in Russia valued $7 million (USD). This donation consisted of paintings and sculptures by the Russian artist Vladimir Sterligov, and the French impressionist, Edgar Degas.

=== Artnewspaper Israel ===
In 2018, he obtained the publishing rights of the Art Newspaper Israel. The Art Newspaper is an online and printed international publication which covers the international art and culture world, and is supported by its network editions in London, Moscow, New York, Beijing, and Paris.

=== Culture ===
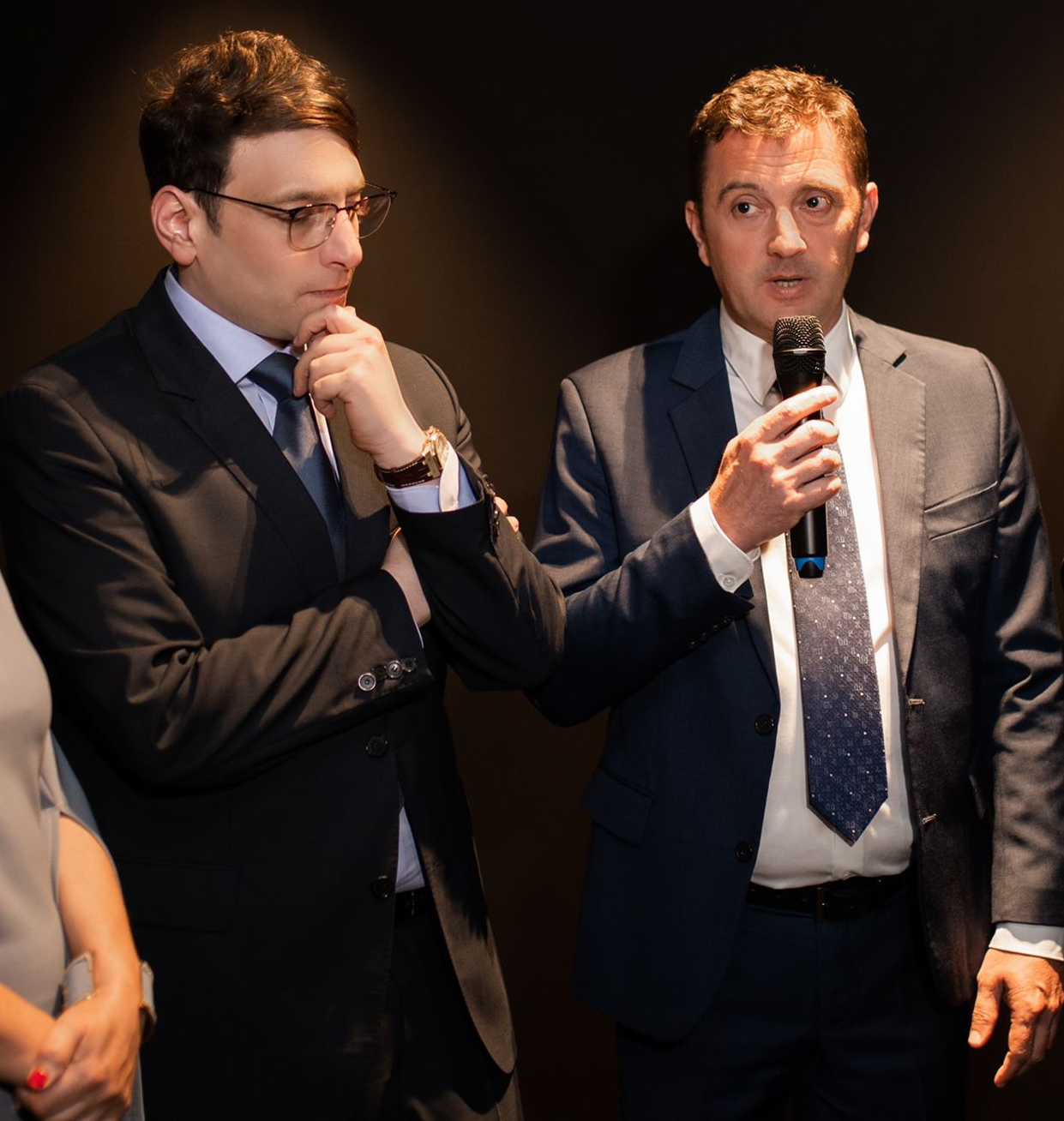
The Hub of Fine Arts, Mostar 2022

In 2012, he co-directed and sponsored a publication dealing with how the Soviets traded away their nation's art (1917–1938), titled "Selling Russia's Treasures".

In 2013, he co-edited the publication titled "White city – Bauhaus Architecture in Tel Aviv," which presents Tel Aviv's Bauhaus architectural heritage, and co-edited and directed the publication titled "Lissitzky – Kabakov, Utopia and Reality".

In 2014, Kabiri sponsored "Tel Aviv Days in St. Petersburg", a cultural event led by the Israeli General Consulate in St. Petersburg.

In the year 2018, Kabiri supported a project led by the Ministry of Foreign Affairs of Israel and numerous Macedonian partners, of cleaning, restoring and documenting the Balkans' oldest Jewish cemetery in the city of Bitola. The ancient Jewish cemetery became the "Park of the Living" in Bitola, honoring the Jews who were deported and then executed in Treblinka. The memorial park includes art exhibits of Jewish and non-Jewish artists, commemorating the community.

The Sarajevo Film Festival was supported by Kabiri's foundation, which became the host of the 28th Sarajevo Film Festival Opening Gala Reception. With this sponsorship M.T. Abraham Group continues to strengthen the local art and culture scene by supporting different projects throughout Bosnia and Herzegovina. Kabiri considers Mostar his second home after Israel.

== Activism ==
=== Jewish Community of Mostar ===
In 2022, he was nominated as the Head of the Jewish community in Mostar. Mr. Kabiri is known for his fight to retrieve the old Synagogue of Mostar to the hands of the Jewish community.

In September 2022, Kabiri attended a ceremony at the Jewish Cemetery in Mostar where he paid tribute to the 137 murdered Mostar Jews.

=== Conference of European Rabbis ===
In September 2022, Mr. Kabiri was appointed as board of patrons member of The Conference of European Rabbis.

=== Chamber of Commerce of the State of Israel in Bosnia and Herzegovina ===
On September 1, 2022, Mr. Kabiri established the Israel - Bosnia and Herzegovina Chamber of Commerce, aiming to support businesses in BiH and Israel, and promote the diplomatic relations between the countries. In April 2023, the Chamber held a reception in Mostar to celebrate Eid-ul-Fitr and extended their congratulations to the Muslim community.

=== Human Rights ===
As of the year 2021, Kabiri's M.T. Abraham Group holds an annual Equality Forum, with the intent to enhance community and corporate awareness, celebrate diversity and foster social change and human rights in the Balkans region.

On the International Women’s Day, March 8, 2022, the conference "Women in the Business" was held in Aluminij Industries in Mostar. This conference was jointly organized by the M.T. Abraham Group and Večernji list BiH, which is the first time that a private company has organized a conference that promotes women.

=== Removal of fascist street names ===
As the head of the Jewish community in Mostar, Kabiri was creating the foundation which lead to a decision of the Mostar City Council to the change the street names of Mile Budak, Vokić and Lorković, Rafael Boban, Đuro Spužević, Jure Francetić and Ivo Zelenika.

Mile Budak was one of the most active in propaganda directed against Jews. He signed the Ustasha racial laws directed against Serbs, Jews and Romani people.

Rafael Boban was Ustasha colonel and general of the Croatian armed forces.

Jure Francetić was a Croatian Ustasha Commissioner for the Bosnia and Herzegovina regions of the Independent State of Croatia (NDH) during World War II, and commander of the 1st Ustashe Regiment of the Ustasha Militia, later known as the Black Legion. In both roles he was responsible for the massacre of Serbs and Jews.

Ante Vokić was appointed to the Ustasha supervisory staff, whose task was to lead the existing Ustasha combat formations, form and build further formations. During his work in Sarajevo, Adolf Hitler awarded him with the Order of the German Eagle.

Mladen Lorković was one of the founders of the Ustasha movement, one of the closest collaborators of Ante Pavelić and the Minister of the Interior of the NDH.

Ivo Zelenika served as an Ustasha camp commander in Zagreb. The camp commander was responsible for the correct application of Ustasha principles, the accurate and conscientious execution of the principles of the Regulations and the orders of superior officials of the Ustasha movement, and was especially responsible for the work of all camp officials, collectors and their assistants.

=== Activism against Antisemitism ===
In July 2022, just before the match between Leotar and Zrinjski, the players of both teams raised a slogan against Antisemitism. This was in the aftermath of the appointment of Kabiri as the Chairman of the Board of HŠK Zrinjski football club and his MT Abraham company becoming the sponsor of the club.

In August 2022, following the incident in which a swastika was spray-painted on the entrance of ‘The Hub of Fine Arts', Kabiri stressed that the fight against anti-Semitism and xenophobia is far from over. He also noted that perpetrators of such hate crimes do not represent the citizens of Mostar or the people of Bosnia.

== Sports ==
=== Hapoel Tel Aviv F.C. ===
In 2015, he bought the Hapoel Tel Aviv soccer club from Israel, and in 2016, he signed a collaboration agreement with China Machinery Engineering Corporation ("CMEC") which includes the future construction of the new stadium of Hapoel Tel Aviv. He split with Hapoel after financial problems of the club.

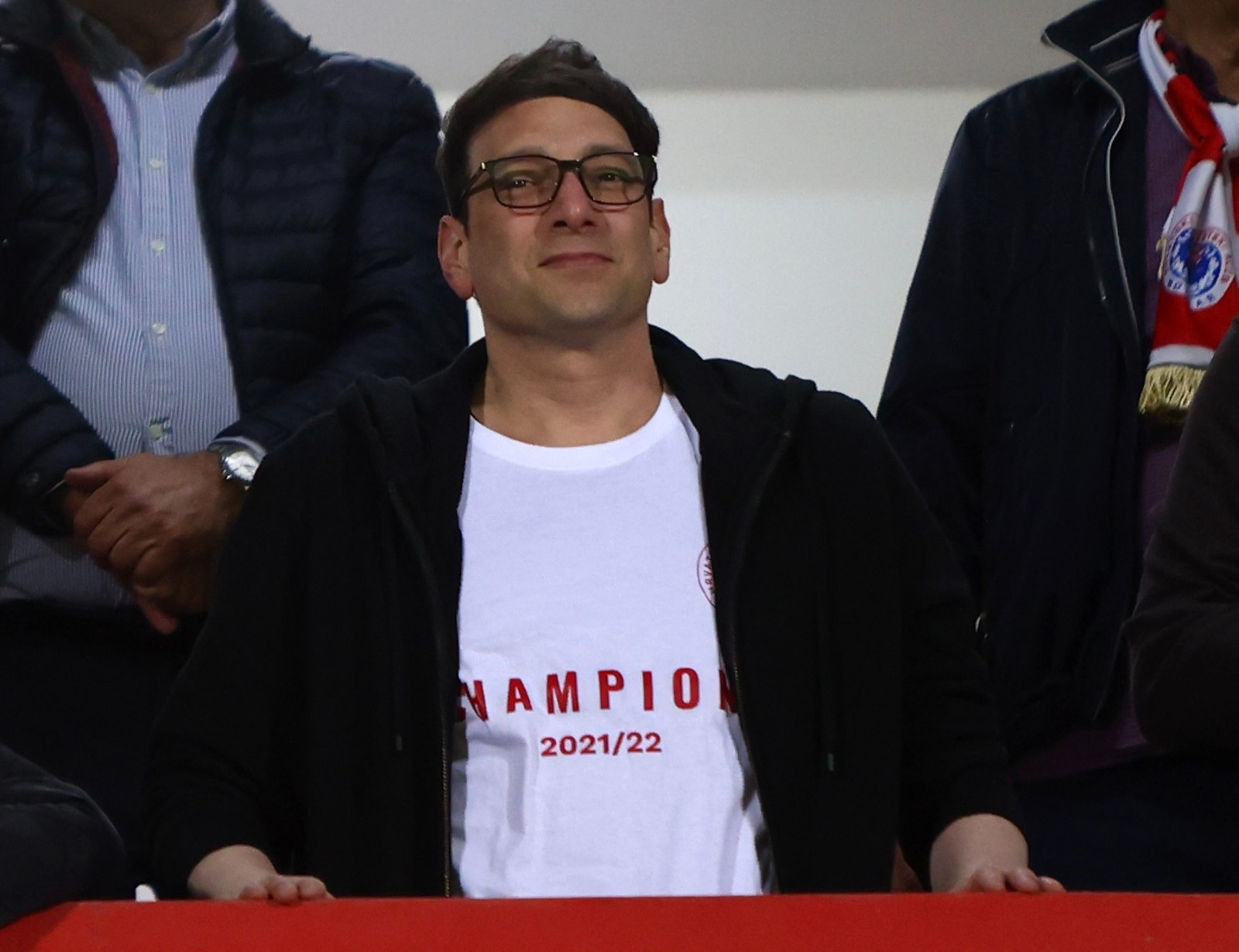
Zrinjski Stadium, Mostar 2022

=== HŠK Zrinjski Mostar ===
In December 2021, Mr. Kabiri was appointed Chairman of the Board of HŠK Zrinjski football club and his M.T. Abraham Group became the general sponsor of the Club. In August 2023, the Italian sports newspaper Gazzetta dello Sport alleged that Zrinjski Mostar had historical ties to the Ustasha. Kabiri, strongly denied these allegations, emphasizing the club's commitment to inclusivity and diversity.

=== Lana Pudar ===
In January 2022, M.T. Abraham Group became a sponsor of BIH rising swimming star Lana Pudar and was the golden sponsor of the 'Mostar Run Weekend 2022'.

=== The Nobels Football Academy ===
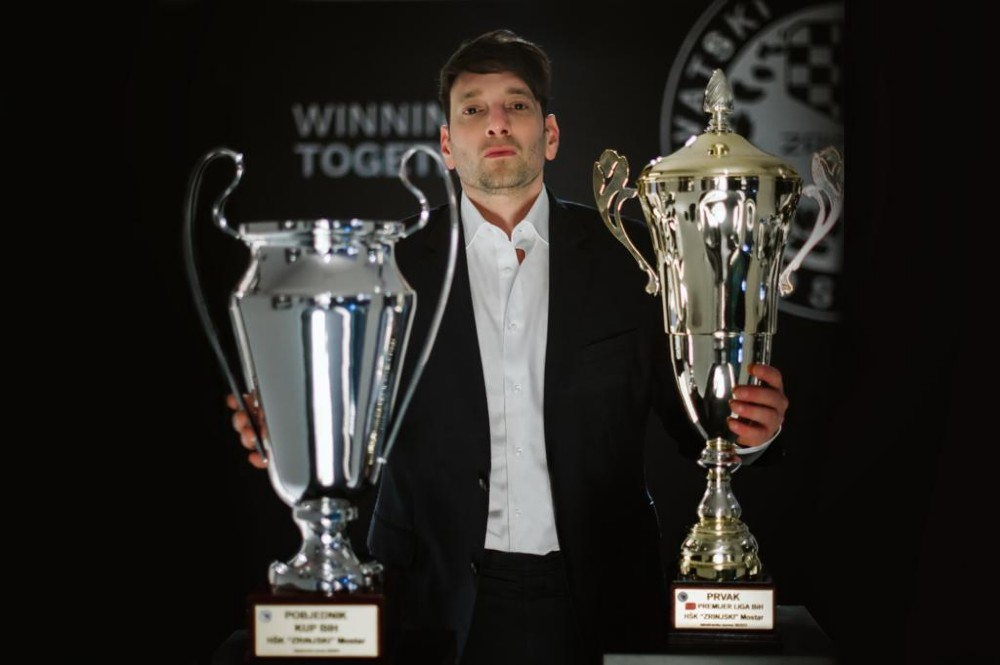
Amir Gross Kabiri 2023

In October 2022 Kabiri announced a joint project between the M.T. Abraham Group and HŠK Zrinjski football club "The Nobels Football Academy" which will be built in Mostar with the aim to create a football academy that will serve the HŠK Zrinjski football club.

== Awards ==
In March 2022 he was awarded the "Businessman of the Year 2022 in BiH" award by Večernji List newspaper. He was nominated for the award again in 2023.
