= Little Dancer (musical) =

Musical theatre play

- Music: Stephen Flaherty
- Lyrics: Lynn Ahrens
- Book: Lynn Ahrens
- Basis: c. 1880 sculpture Little Dancer of Fourteen Years by Edgar Degas
- Premiere: October 25, 2014: John F. Kennedy Center for the Performing Arts, Washington, D.C.
- Productions: 2014 Kennedy Center; 2027 West End

Little Dancer is a musical with music by Stephen Flaherty and book and lyrics by Lynn Ahrens, based on Edgar Degas' 1880 statue Little Dancer of Fourteen Years. The musical premiered at the Kennedy Center in Washington, D.C. in 2014. The original production was directed and choreographed by Susan Stroman.

The musical was retitled Marie, Dancing Still – A New Musical in 2018, prior to the production opening at the 5th Avenue Theatre, Seattle in March 2019, and returned to its original title thereafter.

== Production history ==
The musical premiered at the Kennedy Center's Eisenhower Theatre on October 25, 2014. The production closed on November 30, 2014.

The writing team passed on a potential Los Angeles run in 2015 in order to do rewrites and revisions on the piece. The invitation-only March 28, 2016 industry reading featured a newly revised draft of the show. Participants included a number of cast members from the original Kennedy Center production, including New York City Ballet principal dancer Tiler Peck, Rebecca Luker, Karen Ziemba, Kyle Harris and Michael X. Martin.

A private reading was held in June 2018. The reading featured Tiler Peck, Robert Lindsay, Kate Baldwin and Karen Ziemba. The musical was retitled Marie, A New Musical in 2018, and then Marie, Dancing Still. This is based on the "developmental work done by the creators to focus on the once ‘unknown’ woman at the heart of the story." The musical opened at the 5th Avenue Theatre, Seattle on March 22, 2019 and concluded on April 14. The cast for the 5th Avenue Theatre production included Tiler Peck (Marie), Terrence Mann (Degas), Louise Pitre (Adult Marie), Dee Hoty (Mary Cassatt) and Karen Ziemba (Martine Van Goethem), with direction and choreography by Stroman.

In May 2025, it was announced that a one-night-only concert staging of the musical would be staged at the Theatre Royal, Drury Lane in July of that year, starring Peck, Julian Ovenden and Lara Pitt-Pulford. It was announced in October 2026 that a full staging would play at Theatre Royal Haymarket from February 2027, with Peck, Ovenden and Pitt-Pulford reprising their roles.

== Synopsis ==
The musical is inspired by the story of Marie van Goethem, a young ballerina who posed for Edgar Degas. Marie became, inadvertently, the most famous dancer in the world. Torn by her family's poverty, her debt to the artist, and the lure of wealthy men, she struggles to keep her place in the corps de ballet. She is a girl on the verge of womanhood, caught between the conflicting demands of life and art.

== Musical numbers ==
=== Washington, D.C. ===
Act 1

- "C'est le Ballet" – Adult Marie, Company
- "Little Hole in the Wall" – Young Marie, Charlotte, Adult Marie
- "Eye Examination" – Doctors
- "Unfinished" – Degas, Mary Cassatt
- "A Rat" – Rats, Adult Marie, Company
- "Musicians and Dancers and Fools" – Christian
- "Laundry" – Martine, Adult Marie, Antoinette, Young Marie, Charlotte, Laundresses
- "Little Opportunities" – Antoinette, Company
- "Petite Chanson" – Martine, Bar Patrons, Young Marie
- "Ballerina" – Charlotte, Young Marie
- "In Between" – Degas
- "Act One Finale" – Degas, Adult Marie, Young Marie

Act 2

- "Looking Back at Myself" – Adult Marie
- "At the Dressing Table" – Antoinette, Martine, Young Marie
- "Les Petites Danseuses" – Corbeil, Abonnes
- "I'll Follow You" – Philippe
- "Observations " – Mary Cassatt
- "Little Opportunities (Reprise) " – Antoinette
- "Moving Up in the World" – Martine, Laundresses, Adult Marie, Young Marie, Charlotte
- "Dancing Still" – Christian
- "A Box of Things" – Degas, Young Marie
- "The Exposition" – Degas, Company
- "What You Made of Me" – Adult Marie
- "The Little Dancer Ballet " – Young Marie, Company
- "Finale" – Company

=== Seattle, WA. ===
Act 1

- "Prologue" – Young Marie
- "C'est le Ballet" – Adult Marie, Company
- "Laundry" – Martine, Young Marie, Charlotte, Laundresses
- "The Eye Examination" – Doctors
- "Never Done Before" – Degas
- "A Rat" – Young Marie, Adult Marie, Company
- "Musicians and Dancers and Fools" – Christian
- "Little Opportunities" – Antoinette, Degas, Company
- "Petite Chanson" – Martine, Le Rat Mort Patrons, Young Marie. Charlotte
- "The Audition" – Adult Marie
- "Marie" – Degas
- "Act One Finale" – Degas, Adult Marie, Young Marie

Act 2

- "Looking Back at Myself" – Adult Marie, Company
- "At the Dressing Table" – Young Marie, Rats
- "Les Petites Danseuses" – Corbeil, Abonnes
- "Observations " – Mary Cassatt
- "Little Opportunities (Reprise) " – Antoinette
- "Laundry (Reprise)" – Martine, Laundresses, Adult Marie
- "A Box of Things" – Degas, Young Marie
- "The Life of the Person" – Degas
- "Between Us" – Christian, Young Marie
- "The Exposition" – Degas, Company
- "What You Made of Me" – Adult Marie
- "The Choices: A Ballet " – Young Marie, Company
- "Finale" – Company

== Cast ==
Character	Washington, D.C. (2014)	Private Reading (2016)	Private Reading (2018)	Seattle (2019)	London (2025)
Young Marie van Goethem	Tiler Peck	Tiler Peck	Tiler Peck	Tiler Peck	Tiler Peck
Adult Marie van Goethem	Rebecca Luker	Rebecca Luker	Kate Baldwin	Louise Pitre	Laura Pitt-Pulford
Edgar Degas	Boyd Gaines		Robert Lindsay	Terrence Mann	Julian Ovenden
Mary Cassatt, Proprietress	Janet Dickinson		Dee Hoty	Dee Hoty	Debbie Kurup
Martine van Goethem	Karen Ziemba	Karen Ziemba	Karen Ziemba	Karen Ziemba	Josefina Gabrielle
Charlotte van Goethem	Sophia Anne Caruso	Allie Kiesel	Sami Bray	Noelle Hogan	Imogen Amos
Sabine, Madame Théodore	Michele Ragusa		Barbara Marineau	Barbara Marineau	Britt Lenting
Christian, Bartender	Kyle Harris	Kyle Harris	Kyle Harris	Kyle Harris	David Albury
Monsieur Auguste Corbeil, Monsieur Pascal Plouff	Michael McCormick		Christopher Gurr	Christopher Gurr	Rohan Tickell
Antoinette van Goethem	Jenny Powers		Scarlett Strallen	Jenny Powers	Imogen Bailey
Philippe de Marchal	Seán Martin Hingston		Seán Martin Hingston	David Elder	Jack Wilcox
Luis Merante	Joseph J. Simeone		Eric Santagata		
Madame Pruneau	Nina Goldman	Nina Goldman	Nina Goldman	Caitlin Abraham	Gabriella Tooma
Nicoline Sansouci	Jolina Javier	Jolina Javier	Jolina Javier	Jolina Javier	Gabriela Rodriguez
Esmé Pruneau	Polly Baird	Polly Baird	Polly Baird	Polly Baird	Holly Saw
Chantal Brett	Lyrica Woodruff		Megan Masako Haley	Lyrica Woodruff	Lowri Shone
Ondine Gigot	Juliet Doherty	Jasmine Ward		Jasmine Ward	
Ensemble	Polly Baird; Wendi Bergamini; Lauren Blackman; Sophia Anne Caruso; Janet Dickinson; Juliet Doherty; Nina Goldman; Kyle Harris; Seán Martin Hingston; Jolina Javier; Michael X. Martin; Michael McCormick; James A. Pierce III; Jenny Powers; Katelyn Prominski; Michele Ragusa; John Riddle; Amy Ruggiero; Joseph J. Simeone; Justin Urso; Lyrica Woodruff	Polly Baird; Sissy Bell; Nina Goldman; Stephen Hanna; Kyle Harris; Jolina Javier; Michael X. Martin; Claire Rathbun; Sophie Silnicki; Jasmine Ward	Polly Baird; Sissy Bell; Lauren Blackman; Jim Borstelmann; Sami Bray; Nina Goldman; Christopher Gurr; Megan Masako Haley; Kyle Harris; Heather Hill; Seán Martin Hingston; Dee Hoty; Jolina Javier; Barbara Marineau; Olivia Puckett; Arbender Robinson; Eric Santagata; Scarlett Strallen	Caitlin Abraham; Polly Baird; Lauren Blackman; Anaïs Blake; Jim Borstelmann; Abbey Del Corral; David Elder; Sara Esty; Justin Genna; Tyler Hardwick; Jolina Javier; Barbara Marineau; Jasmine Ward; Lyrica Woodruff	

== Awards and honors ==
=== Original Washington, D.C. production (2014) ===
Year	Award Ceremony	Category	Nominee	Result
2015	Helen Hayes Awards	Outstanding Choreography, Musical—HAYES Production	Susan Stroman	Won
