= Van Goethem =

Van Goethem is a surname. Notable people with the surname include:

- Kenneth Van Goethem (born 1984), Belgian footballer
- Marie van Goethem (1865–?), French ballet dancer and artist's model
- Nicole Van Goethem (1941–2000), Belgian animation director.
- Patrick Van Goethem (born 1969), Belgian opera singer
