= Cathy Marie Buchanan =

Canadian novelist

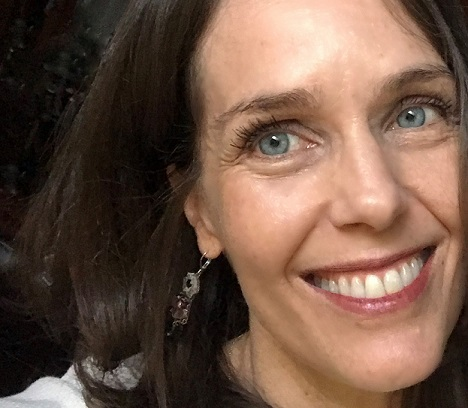
- Born: Niagara Falls, Ontario
- Education: Western University
- Occupation: novelist
- Writing career
- Period: 2009–present
- Website: cathymariebuchanan.com

Cathy Marie Buchanan (born 1964) is a Canadian novelist.

== Early life and education ==
Buchanan was born in 1964 and grew up in Niagara Falls, Ontario, one of five children including three sisters. She studied ballet throughout secondary school. She holds a BSc (Honours Biochemistry) and an MBA from Western University.

== Career ==
Buchanan worked for IBM, coming to writing relatively late in life.

The Day the Falls Stood Still, Buchanan's debut novel, was published in 2009. Inspired by the life of Niagara riverman, William "Red" Hill, the novel chronicles early hydroelectric development on the Niagara River. Quill & Quire called it "entertaining" but "overly theatrical", while Kirkus Reviews said Buchanan's prose was "elegant", but limited by "sentimentality". Globe and Mail reviewer Judith Fitzgerald said "Few first novels exhibit the mastery, maturity and majesty of Buchanan's riveting fictional debut."

The Painted Girls, her second novel, was published in 2013. The Painted Girls is set in Belle Époque Paris and was inspired by the real-life model, Marie van Goethem, for Edgar Degas's c. 1880 statue Little Dancer of Fourteen Years and a notorious criminal trial of the era. Kirkus Reviews called it a "must-read", noting Buchanan's "masterful job" of weaving historical figures into the plot and her "moving yet unsentimental portrait" of familial love, and The Washington Post's reviewer Susan Vreeland called it a "captivating story of fate, tarnished ambition and the ultimate triumph of sister-love." The book was selected by Ontario Library Association patrons as winner of the Forest of Reading Evergreen Award in 2014. Good Housekeeping magazine listed it as one of their "Best Novels 2013".

Buchanan's 2020 historical fiction novel, Daughter of Black Lake is a coming of age story set in the boglands of Iron Age Britain. Publishers Weekly said it was "thoughtful, inventive historical fiction", however Kirkus Reviews called it "unremarkable", devoting "many, many pages to worldbuilding, at the expense of advancing the narrative."
