= M.T. Abraham Foundation =

Non-profit art organization

MTA FOUNDATION
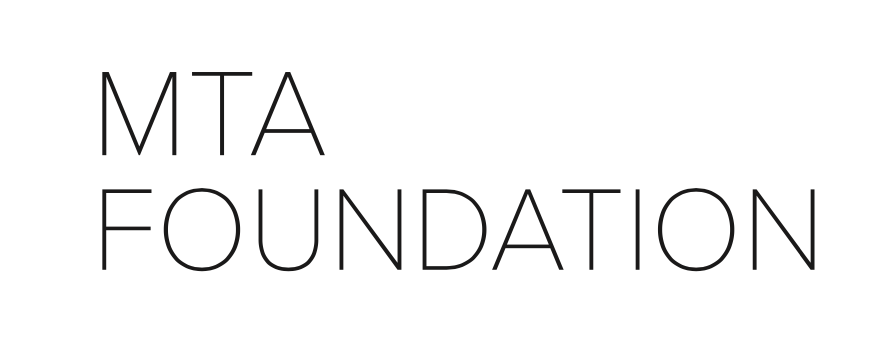
- Founded: 2004
- Type: Non-profit Art Foundation
- Purpose: Impressionist and modern art
- Location: Tel-Aviv
- Origins: Geneva, Switzerland
- Region served: Worldwide
- Method: Exhibition, education, publishing
- President: Amir Gross Kabiri
- Chairman: Isaac Tamir
- Key people: Amir Gross Kabiri (President)
- Website: https://www.mtabraham.org/

The M.T. Abraham Foundation (MTA Foundation) is a non-profit cultural institution, which is part of the Israeli M.T. Abraham Group. Its headquarters are in Tel Aviv, Israel, and its part of the collection is on permanent display in Mostar. Its stated intent is to promote public appreciation of the most important styles of Modernism: Post-Impressionism, Fauvism, Cubism, Cubo-Futurism, Futurism, Constructivism and Suprematism by collecting pieces that can be loaned "for the sole purpose of display and study by public institutions," and to present most effectively the first half of the 20th century, a period that saw revolutionary tendencies shape the art scene.

Through its publishing department, the Foundation promotes, publishes and facilitates research related to its collection. It also supports discussions on the artistic trends that shaped fine art from the 19th to the 21st century. In June 2019 the foundation pledged a donation from its collection to the State Hermitage Museum in Russia valued at 7 million (USD). This donation consisted of paintings and sculptures by the Russian artist Vladimir Sterligov, and the French impressionist, Edgar Degas.

== History ==
The Foundation was founded by the M.T. Abraham Group in 2004 as a non-profit organization. Its President in Amir Gross Kabiri. It is based in Geneva, Switzerland, with head offices in Tel Aviv, Israel.

== Mission ==
=== Exhibitions ===
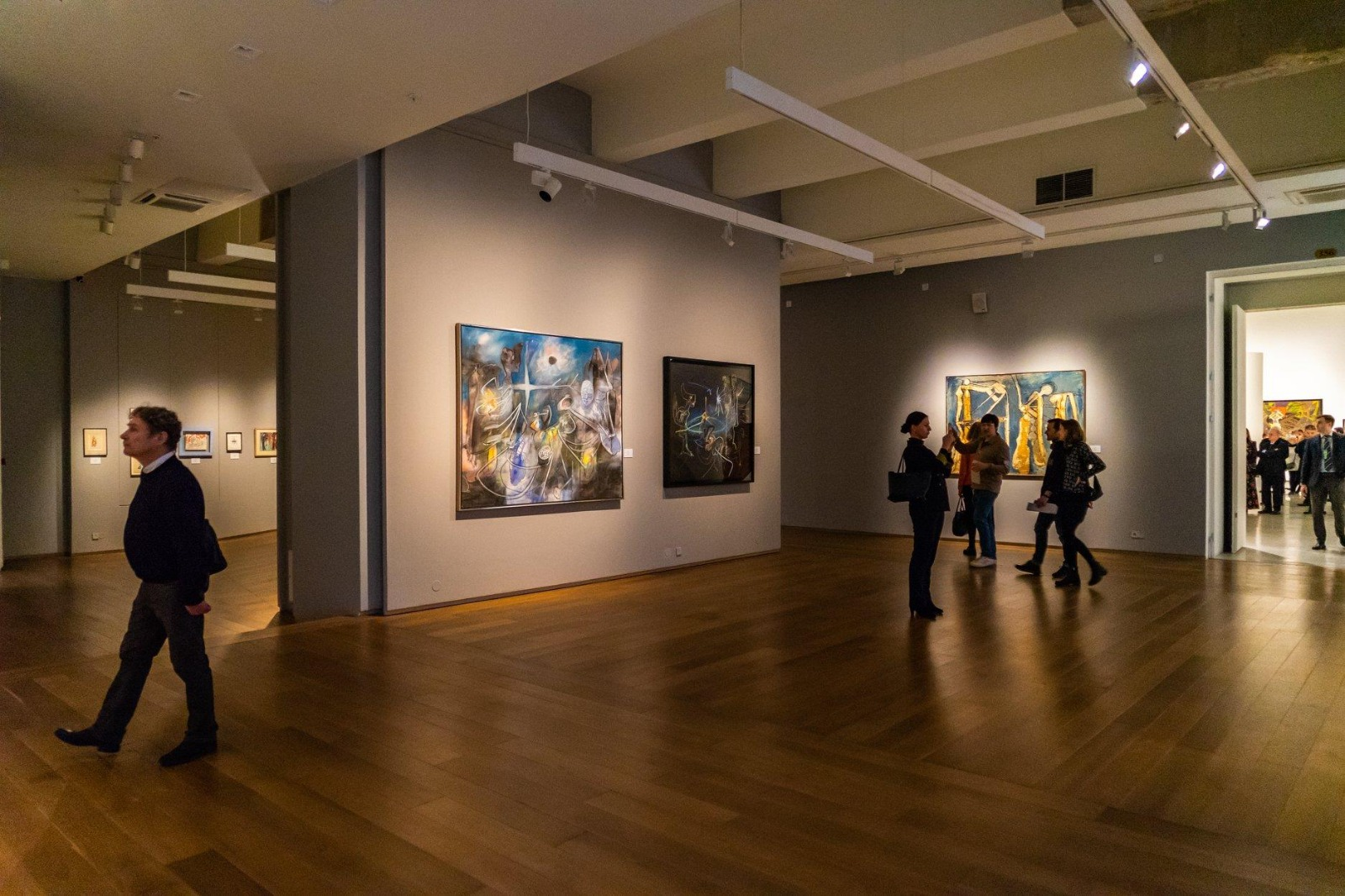
Roberto Matta, Three Figures, 1958c., displayed during an exhibition by MTA foundation.

The Foundation's stated mission is promoting public appreciation of European, Russian and American Modernism. It has a loan program which makes works available for public exhibition at accredited institutions.

=== Education ===
The Foundation also provides support for young artists and students in Judaic studies.

== Publishing ==
Through its publishing department, the Foundation publicizes and facilitates research related to its permanent collection.

In 2013, the Foundation's publishing department published “Selling Russia’s Treasures”, the story of the sale of Russian national art treasures confiscated from the tsarist royal family, the church, private individuals, and museums in the Soviet Union.

As part of "Tel Aviv Days in St. Petersburg," a cultural event under the auspices of the Israeli General Consulate in St. Petersburg and the Israeli Ministry of Foreign Affairs, the Foundation helped organize an international exhibition at the State Hermitage Museum titled "White City - Bauhaus Architecture in Tel Aviv," which portrays the city's urban and architectural heritage.

The Foundation subsequently published White City – Bauhaus Architecture in Tel Aviv. The same year they published Lissitzky – Kabakov, Utopia and Reality at the Hermitage Museum and at the Multimedia Art Museum in Moscow.

== Collections ==
The collection contains artworks by artists such as Edgar Degas, Amedeo Modigliani, Henri Matisse, Henri Rousseau, Kees van Dongen, Tamara de Lempicka, Maurice de Vlaminck, Natalia Goncharova, Aleksandra Ekster, Lyubov Popova, Roberto Matta, Gabriele Münter, Jean Puy, Jean Duffy, Alexander Rodchenko, Auguste Chabaud, Andres Gleizes, Jean Metzinger, Henry Manguin, Andre Lhote, Suzanne Valadon, Louis Valtat, Auguste Herbin, Leon de Smet, Maximillian Luce, and Georges Folmer. Many artworks in the collection are listed in the respective artist’s Catalogue Raisonné.

The Foundation owns a complete collection of 74 bronze sculptures by French Impressionist Edgar Degas, including a cast of The Little Dancer Aged Fourteen. According to a number of experts, following criticism of his first sculpture Little Dancer, Degas had privately accumulated casts for sculptures that were only discovered after his death. They feature dancers, horses, bathers, etc. Apart from the MTA Foundation, as of 2010, only four museums worldwide have near-complete collections.

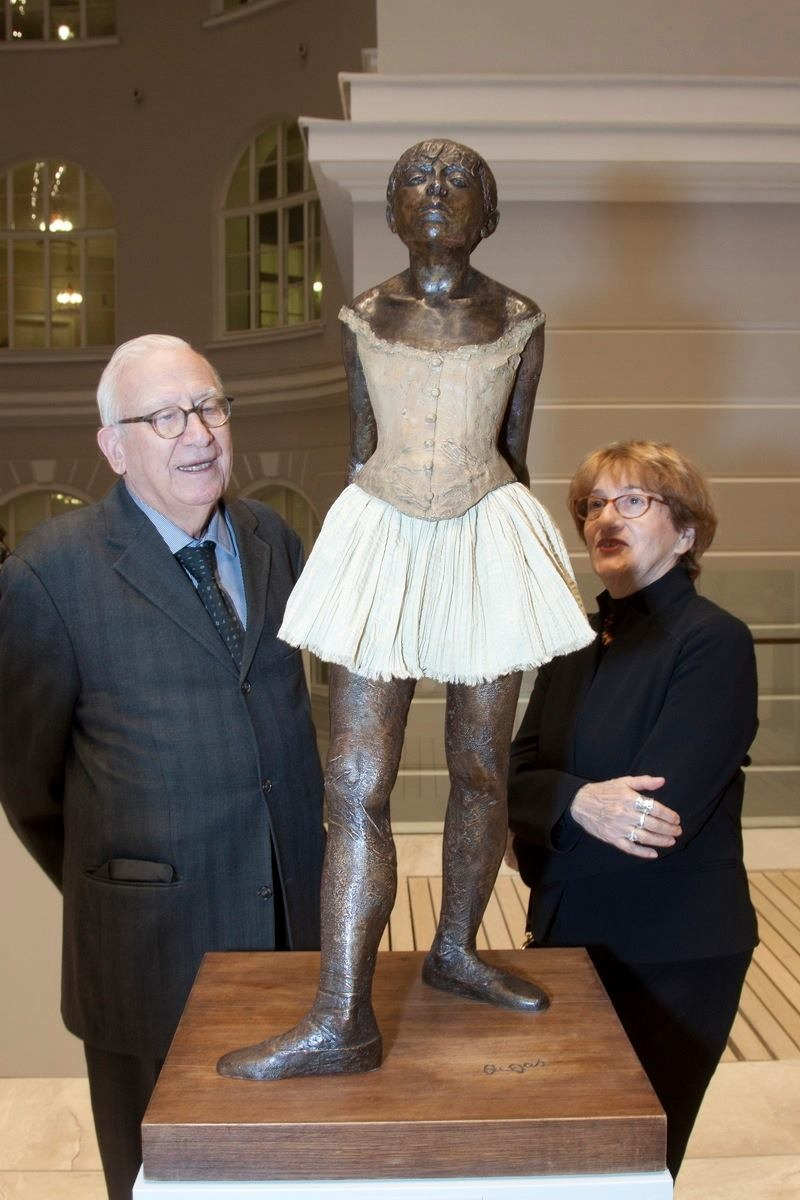
"The Little Dancer" from "The Complete Sculptures of Edgar Degas" collection on display.

The foundation is the owner of the painting Annie Bjarne (1919) by Amedeo Modigliani (1884–1920). Modigliani met the woman Annie Bjarne through a mutual friend at the Café de la Rotonde in the Montparnasse Quarter in Paris and he asked her to pose for him, which she did in his apartment located above the café. The canvas properties suggest that this painting was part of a canvas cluster which produced four paintings. In addition, this painting has a provenance which bears witness to both its enormous significance and the great interest it has garnered among renowned art collectors and art institutions worldwide. The painting has also been the subject of dozens of critical studies and has been included in numerous publications on the art of Amedeo Modigliani.

In November 2009, the foundation began touring its Degas collection around the world under the name The Complete Sculptures of Edgar Degas. It first spent five months at the Herakleidon Museum in Athens, marking the first time the sculptures were exhibited in Greece. By March 2010 the sculptures moved to the Tel Aviv Art Museum in Israel. In September 2010 the exhibition opened for two months at the National Art Gallery in Sofia, Bulgaria. It also appeared at the Instituto Valenciano de Arte Moderno. All the exhibitions were supported by the Institut de France and the local French embassies. Workshops for children always accompanied the exhibitions.

In May 2022, The Hub of Fine Arts was opened in Mostar, Bosnia and Herzegovina, by the M.T. Abraham Group and the MTA Foundation as part of their ongoing support aimed at promoting understanding and appreciation of fine art. The Hub of Fine Arts exhibits part of the MTA Foundation collection. Amir Gross Kabiri, the founder and owner of The Hub of Fine Arts, revealed: "As part of my strategic decision to deepen M.T.A. Group’s involvement and operation in the Balkans and specifically in Bosnia and Herzegovina, I have been spending most of my time in recent years in this region. During this time, I have gotten to know the people, their dedication, drive and work ethics and I have great belief in the potential and future of this country. It was only natural for me then, to extend our Group's activities to the fields of art, culture and education, as I have always believed that it is the way to create strong connections between different people and cultures. I am excited to share my passion for art through an art collection of 100 works, displayed at The Hub of Fine Arts, with local art lovers and visitors from all over the world."

=== Conference ===
The subject of the Colloquium was 20th-century bronze casts by Edgar Degas, Pierre-Auguste Renoir, Auguste Rodin, Constantin Brâncuși, Alexander Archipenko, Salvador Dalí, and other artists. The colloquium examined the legal and artistic problems surrounding what are termed posthumous bronzes - cast bronze sculptures made after the artisan's death. According to State Hermitage Museum General Director Mikhail Piotrovsky, "The world is full of bronze sculptures by famous artists which have been made either with or without the approval of their heirs. This all creates serious problems in the art market, confusing prices. Exhibitions are held of copies which pretend to be cultural events." The views and conclusions of the conference was published in December 2012.

The foundation took part in International Competition “Worlds of El Lissitzky”, an architectural concept of the symbolic object of Novosibirsk city environment dedicated to Russian Avant-garde. Organizers of the Competition Siberian Center for Contemporary Art.
