= Marie van Goethem =

French ballet dancer, model

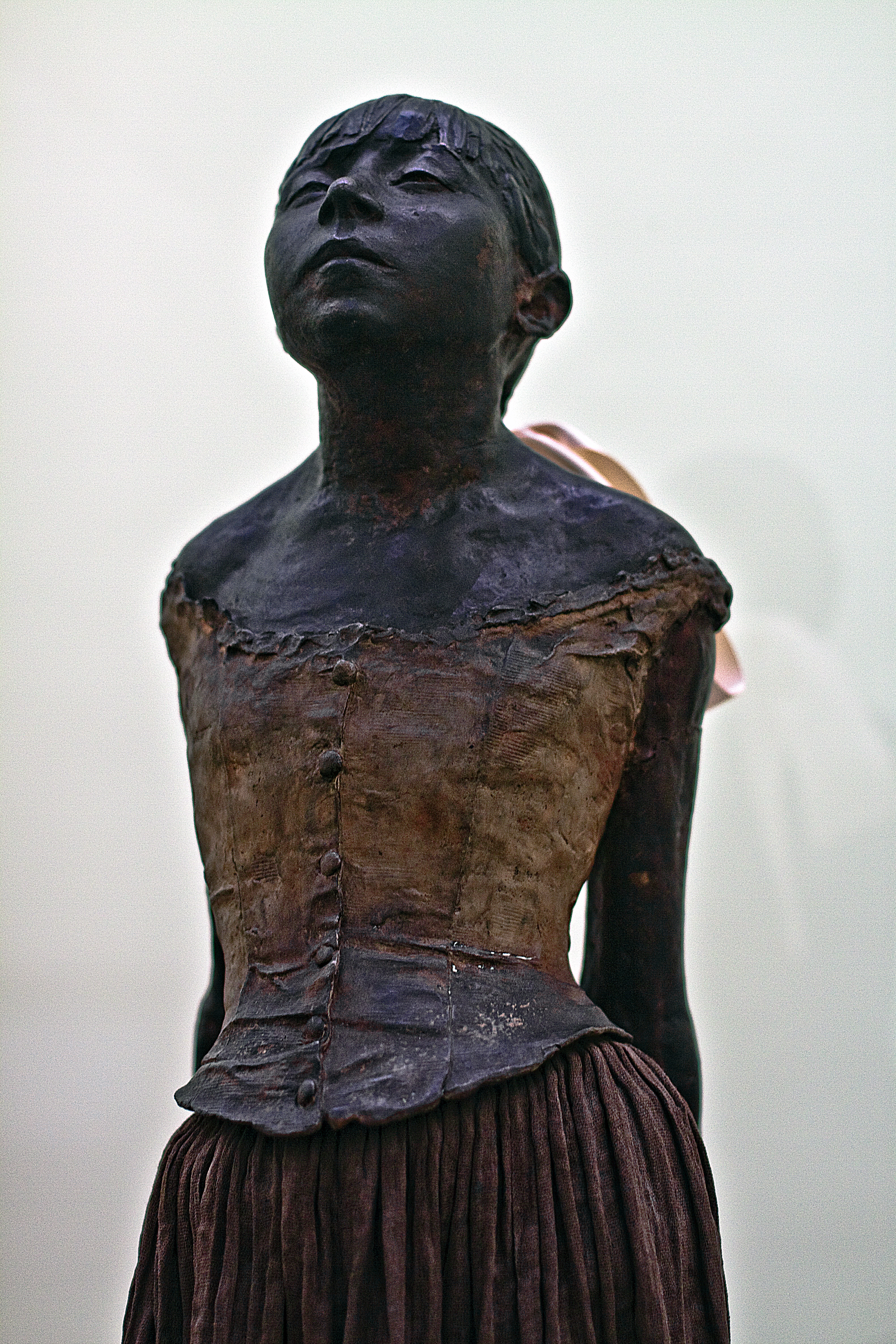
Little Dancer of Fourteen Years, detail of Degas' statue of van Goethem.

Marie Geneviève van Goethem (or Goetham or Goeuthen; 7 June 1865 - 7 December 1935) was a French ballet student and dancer with the Paris Opera Ballet, and the model for Edgar Degas's statue Little Dancer of Fourteen Years (La Petite Danseuse de Quatorze Ans), from c. 1880.She later transitioned into becoming an opera singer.

== Early life ==
Marie Geneviève van Goethem was the daughter of Antoine van Goethem, a tailor, and Marie Van Volsom, who later worked as a laundress. Originally from Belgium, her parents married in Brussels on 2 September 1857 and moved to Paris between 1861 and 1862. The couple had five children, although only three daughters survived into adulthood: Antoinette, born in Brussels in 1861; Marie, born in Paris on 7 June 1865; and Louise Joséphine, born in Paris on 18 July 1870, who later adopted the name Charlotte. Another daughter, also named Marie, was born in Paris in February 1864 but died eighteen days later. Their only son, Jean-Baptiste, born in Brussels in 1859, died in Paris in 1862.

Antoine van Goethem appears to have died between 1870 and 1880, as his wife was identified as a widow in Marie's employment contract with the Paris Opera in 1880. The absence of a corresponding death entry in the civil registers has prevented the exact date of his death from being established. His widow subsequently assumed responsibility for raising their three surviving daughters.

In 1865, the year of Marie's birth, the Van Goethem family lived at 8, place Bréda, in Paris's 9th arrondissement. The Bréda district was described by art historian Martine Kahane as one of the poorest and most squalid areas associated with prostitution in Paris. The family subsequently moved several times, residing at 64, rue Pigalle in 1870 and on boulevard de Clichy in 1873. In 1880, they settled at 35, rue de Douai, also in the 9th arrondissement, where Degas's address book and other records place Marie at number 36 on the same street. Kahane interpreted the family's frequent changes of residence as evidence of poverty and an inability to pay rent on time.

In 1878, Marie and Charlotte were accepted into the dance school of the Paris Opéra, where Antoinette was employed as an extra. In 1880 Marie passed the examination admitting her to the corps de ballet of the Paris Opera Ballet and made her debut on the stage in La Korrigane.

== Marie and Degas ==
Between 1878 and 1881, Degas drew, painted and sculpted Marie in artworks including Dancer with Fan, Dancing Lesson, Dancer Resting, numerous preparatory sketches, and most famously in Little Dancer of Fourteen Years. He frequently attended ballet performances at the Paris Opera and often observed classes at the dance school. By posing for Degas, Marie likely earned five to six francs per four-hour sitting.

When La Petite Danseuse de Quatorze Ans was shown in Paris at the Sixth Impressionist Exhibition of 1881, it received mixed reviews. Though critics lauded the work as “the only truly modern attempt" at sculpture, the majority were shocked by the piece. They compared the dancer to a monkey and an Aztec, and referred to her as a "flower of precocious depravity" with a face "marked by the hateful promise of every vice" and "bearing the signs of a profoundly heinous character." She looked like a medical specimen, they reported, in part because Degas exhibited the sculpture inside a glass case.

== Subsequent life ==
Administrative documents preserved at the French National Archives confirm her dismissal, although they do not explicitly state the reason for the decision. A memorandum dated April 1882, written by Pluque and countersigned by Vaucorbeil, records her dismissal. Her name was subsequently crossed off the registers in June, and she no longer appears on the quadrille's personnel lists from August onwards. Little is known about her life after her dismissal from the Opéra.

A bann of marriage from March 22, 1891 shows that Marie was living with her fiancé George Ringoir, a Brusselian hatmaker, in rue Fontaine 48, Paris; the engagement was broken for unknown reasons. Marie van Goethem is believed to have met Isidore Auguste Chardon in Paris towards the end of the nineteenth century, probably between 1895 and 1900. Isidore Auguste Chardon was also an opera singer.In 1911 she was living with Isidore Auguste Chardon in route de Flandres, Pantin. They marry on August 5th, 1914, the day after the beginning of World War I. Their marriage certificate identifies both of them as opera singers.

Isidore died, aged fifty-four, on March 18th, 1922. The 1931 census shows that Marie moved back to Paris, where she lived alone in rue Fontaine 48 and supported herself by selling trinkets. Some years later she was admitted to the Salpêtrière Hospital for "cerebral softening," the exact nature of which is unclear. She was moved to Château de Brévannes (now Émile-Roux Hospital) in Val-de-Marne, where she remained until her death at seventy years old on December 7th, 1935.

== In fiction, documentary and the arts ==
A fictional family friendly depiction of Marie and Degas was made by HBO in their Artists Specials series, Degas and the Dancer (1998)

Cathy Marie Buchanan's 2013 novel, The Painted Girls, presents a fictionalized account of the life of Marie van Goethem, as do Carolyn Meyer's young adult novel Marie, Dancing, Dancing for Degas by Kathryn Wagner, and Laurence Anholt's children's picture book Degas and the Little Dancer. A non-fiction work by Camille Laurens, La petite danseuse de quatorze ans (2017), discusses the dancer, the artist, the work, and its reception.

The BBC documentary The Private Life of a Masterpiece: Little Dancer Aged Fourteen, produced in 2004, closely examined La Petite Danseuse de Quatorze Ans, the circumstances of Marie's life, and the critical reaction to the sculpture.

A fictionalized account of Marie's life is the subject of the 2014 musical Little Dancer (alternately titled Marie, Dancing Still). Written by Stephen Flaherty (music) and Lynn Ahrens (book and lyrics), the musical made its world premiere at the Eisenhower Theater at the John F. Kennedy Center for the Performing Arts in 2014. Directed and choreographed by Susan Stroman, the production was headlined by New York City Ballet principal dancer Tiler Peck as young Marie, Rebecca Luker as the adult Marie, and Boyd Gaines as Degas. A revised production, also directed by Stroman, played the 5th Avenue Theatre in 2018. Peck returned to the role of young Marie, with Louise Pitre as adult Marie and Terrence Mann as Degas.

== See also ==
- List of dancers
