= Aluminij Industries =

Aluminij Industries d.o.o.
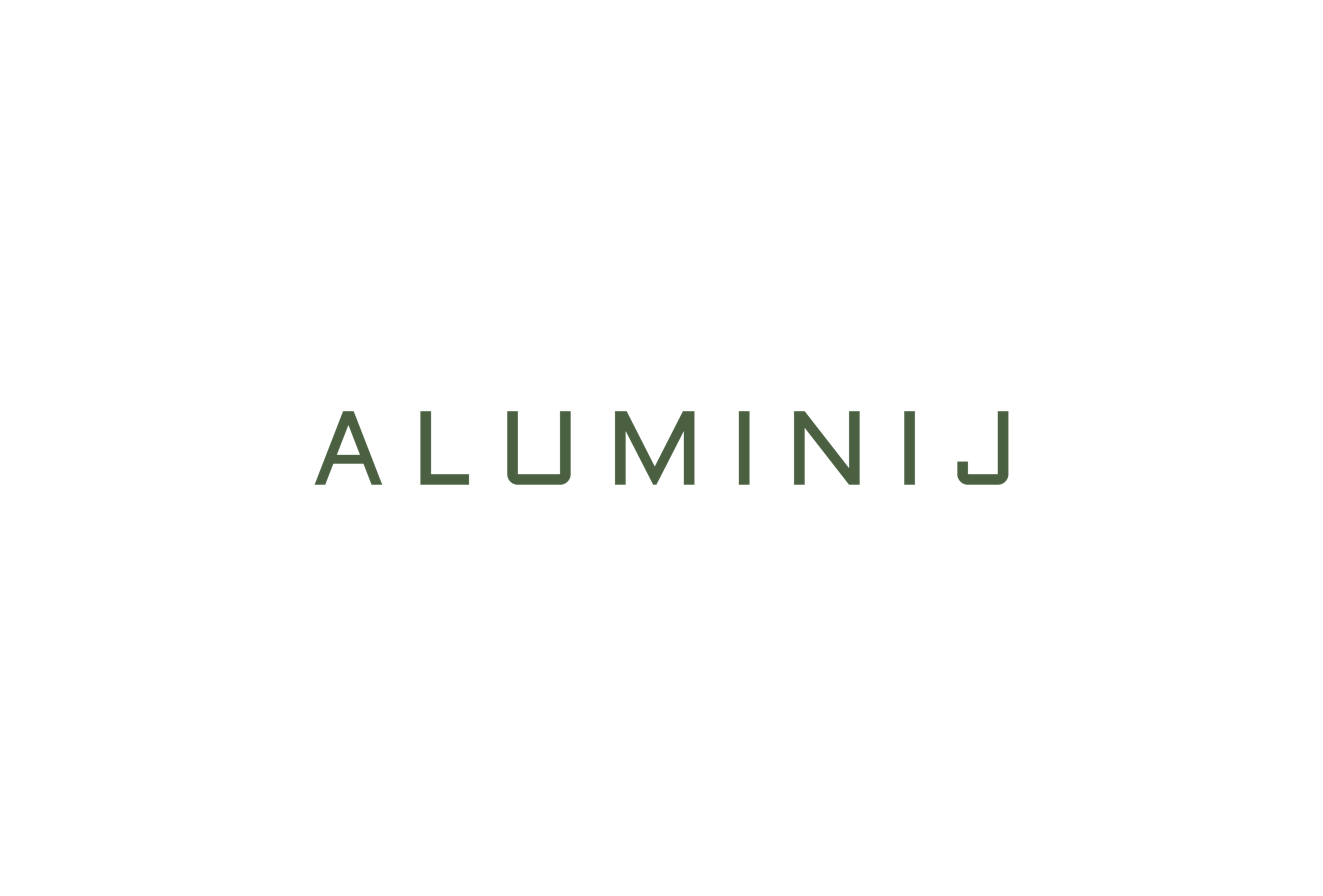
- Type: Subsidiary
- Industry: Aluminium
- Founded: 2020; 6 years ago in Mostar, Bosnia and Herzegovina
- Founder: M.T. Abraham Group
- Headquarters: Mostar, Bosnia and Herzegovina
- Area served: Bosnia and Herzegovina
- Key people: Amir Gross Kabiri (CEO)
- Products: Billets, Slabs, Ingots, Wire Rod, Anodes
- Owner: M.T. Abraham Group
- Number of employees: 293 (2026)
- Parent: M.T. Abraham Group

Aluminij Industries (Serbo-Croatian: Aluminij Industrija) is an aluminium producing company and a subsidiary of M.T. Abraham Group based in Mostar, Bosnia and Herzegovina. Since 2020 it is leasing the production assets of Aluminij, an aluminium producer established in 1975 and for a long time one of the largest producers and exporters in Bosnia and Herzegovina. Since 2022, Aluminij Industries is the largest exporter in Bosnia and Herzegovina and the second largest importer.

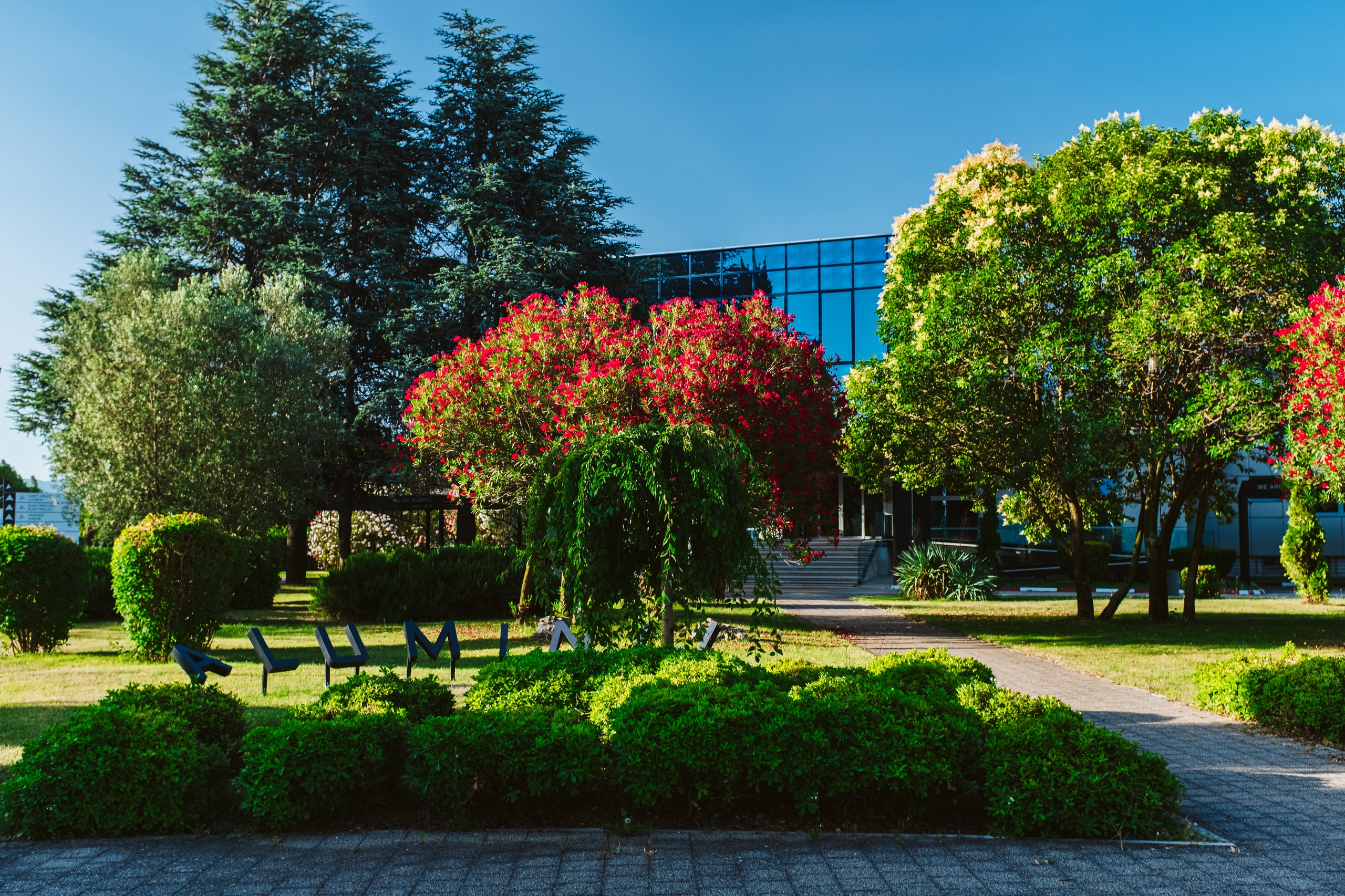
Aluminij Industries Headquarters

== History ==
Aluminij, an aluminium producing company established in 1975, and one of the largest producers and exporters in Bosnia and Herzegovina ever since, halted its production in July 2019, after it had accumulated a large number of unpaid electricity bills from Elektroprivreda HZ HB, which in turn cut off its supply. The government of the Federation of Bosnia and Herzegovina, its largest shareholder, announced a rescue plan for the end of the year.

M.T. Abraham Group, an Israeli company with headquarters in Panama, stated in December 2019, that it plans to revitalise and rescue the existing smelter operations of Aluminij, to implement new operational efficiencies, expand the production and better the management. Thus, Aluminij Industries was established in 2020 in Mostar, as its subsidiary.

In April 2020, Aluminij Industries started leasing the production assets of Aluminij. The deal came after the negotiations between Aluminij's shareholders, including the Federation of Bosnia and Herzegovina, and after they accepted a revised offer from Aluminij Industries' parent company, M.T. Abraham Group. In 2021, Aluminij Industries was the second largest exporter in Bosnia and Herzegovina, as well as the largest importer. In 2022, Aluminij Industries became the largest exporter in Bosnia and Herzegovina, and was the second largest importer.

On 4 May 2023, Aluminij Industries signed $141.2 million worth of deals with Glencore and Duferco. The agreements consisted of building a solar power plant, aluminium recycling facility, and a new factory for green aluminium production.
