= M.T. Abraham Group =

Israeli company headquartered in Tel Aviv

- Company type: Private
- Industry: Aluminium manufacturing, renewable energy, real estate, logistics, Culture Investments.
- Founded: 2004
- Founder: Amir Gross Kabiri, Tamar Kabiri, Isaac Tamir
- Headquarters: Tel Aviv, Israel
- Area served: Azerbaijan, Kazakhstan, Russia, Bosnia and Herzegovina, China, Poland, Ukraine
- Key people: Amir Gross Kabiri (Chairman)
- Products: Aluminium, renewable energy
- Services: Infrastructure development, commodities trading, logistics
- Divisions: M.T. Abraham Foundation
- Subsidiaries: Aluminij Industries

The M.T. Abraham group is an Israeli conglomerate headquartered in Tel Aviv. The group's portfolio consists of aluminium manufacturing, renewable energy, infrastructure development, real estate, commodities trading, logistics, and cultural investments. The group also runs the non-profit art institution M.T. Abraham Foundation.

== History ==
The M.T. Abraham group was founded in 2004 by Israeli businessmen Amir Gross Kabiri, Tamar Kabiri, Isaac Tamir and is based in Tel Aviv with regional presence in Azerbaijan, Kazakhstan, Russia, Bosnia and Herzegovina, China, Poland and Ukraine.

In 2018, the M.T. Abraham group entered the publishing business after obtaining the publishing rights of Art Newspaper Israel, an online and printed international publication which covers the international art and culture world.

In 2020, the group restarted its subsidiary Aluminij Industries, a Bosnian aluminium manufacturer. The company is the largest exporter and importer of Bosnia and Herzegovina.

In April 2022, M.T. Abraham announced an investment of €32 million in renewable energy through solar power generation. It was reported that once operational, the solar power station would produce more than 68,000 MWh annually.

In May 2022, the group invested in opening a museum space, named “Hub of Fine Arts” in the Balkans. The works of art on display at The Hub of Fine Arts represent the first half of the 20th century and the artists of that time period.

In August 2022, Kabiri was in negotiations with the Municipality of Mostar to take over Mostar International Airport .

The group also established a non-profit art organization called The M.T. Abraham Foundation in 2004. The foundation’s main purpose is to promote Russian and European Modernism, Impressionism, and Modern Art by collecting art pieces throughout the world and loaning them for display and study at public institutions.

The Sarajevo Film Festival was supported by the Group, which became the host of the 28th Sarajevo Film Festival Opening Gala Reception.

In December 2022, M.T. Abraham Group became the general sponsor of HŠK Zrinjski Mostar football club.

In January 2022, M.T. Abraham Group became a sponsor of the swimmer Lana Pudar and was the golden sponsor of the 'Mostar Run Weekend 2022'.

On May 4, 2023, M.T. Abraham Group's Aluminij signed $141.2 million worth of deals with Glencore and Duferco. The agreements consisted of building a solar power plant, aluminium recycling facility, and a new factory for green aluminium production.
