= Aluminij Gallery =

Art gallery located in Mostar, Bosnia and Herzegovina

Coordinates: 43.346010°N 17.804117°E

The Aluminij Gallery (Croatian: Galerija Aluminij) is an art gallery located in Mostar, Bosnia and Herzegovina. It is sponsored and run by the aluminium manufacturing company Aluminij.

The gallery most commonly hosts exhibitions of sculpture and painting, and graphic art. A certain number of art works was purchased by the Aluminij Gallery after each exhibition and its fundus also includes a permanent art collection.

The Gallery also hosts presentations of literary achievements, chamber concerts and similar events. The Gallery is open every working day from 7 am to 8 pm, and on Saturdays from 9 am to 2 pm. Admission is free.
