= Louise Pitre =

Canadian actress in musical theatre (born 1957)

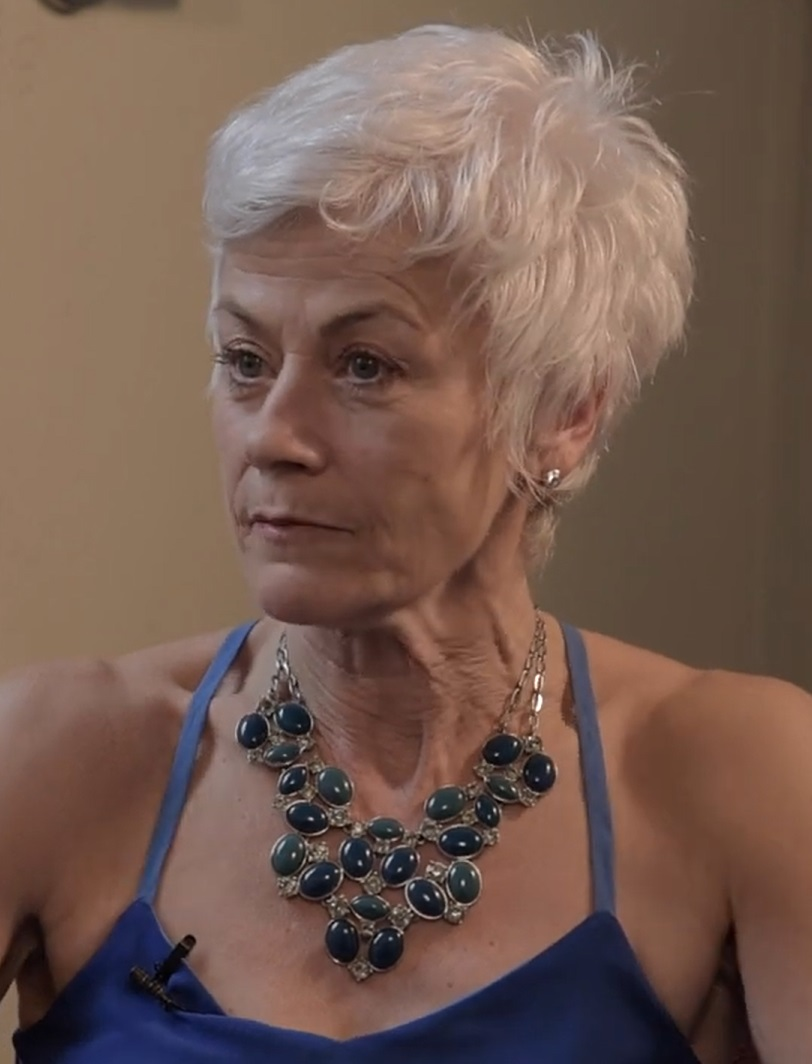
- Pitre in 2017
- Born: January 1, 1957 (age 69); Smooth Rock Falls, Ontario, Canada
- Education: University of Western Ontario
- Occupations: Actress, singer
- Years active: 1979—present
- Website: LouisePitre.com

Louise Pitre (born January 1, 1957) is a Canadian actress in musical theatre. She performs on Broadway and in Canada. She is best known for her role as Donna Sheridan in the ABBA-themed musical Mamma Mia!, which earned her a 2002 Tony Award nomination.

== Early life ==
Pitre was born in Smooth Rock Falls, Ontario; her family moved to Montreal and then to Welland during her childhood. Her first language is French. At age seven, she began to play piano, eventually taking professional lessons. She attended the University of Western Ontario and graduated with a bachelor's degree in music education. After performing in a college musical, however, she began combining music with acting on stage.

== Career ==
Pitre moved to Toronto to pursue a musical theatre career. Her performance as Fantine in the musical adaptation of Les Misérables earned her acclaim in Toronto, Montreal, and Paris. In 1992 she portrayed French singer Edith Piaf in three productions of Piaf.

Other musicals she was involved with include Jacques Brel is Alive and Well and Living in Paris, I Love You, You're Perfect, Now Change, The World Goes 'Round, Blood Brothers, Tartuffe, Who's Afraid of Virginia Woolf?, The Roar of the Greasepaint - The Smell of the Crowd, Applause, and Rock 'n' Roll.

Pitre auditioned in New York City for the musical Napoleon being produced in London, but was turned down for the role of Josephine. The director, Francesca Zambello, told her she was perfect for a show she was also casting in Toronto entitled "Mamma Mia!" Pitre auditioned for the role of Donna Sheridan. Although initially hesitant about the part, she accepted after seeing the show. She performed the role in Toronto and in its United States national tour, and after 18 months, was asked to play the role on Broadway.

Reviews were positive; Variety Magazine, although unenthusiastic about the musical, called her "a terrific Donna", The New York Times called her performance "delightful" and praised her "terrific pop belter's voice", and the San Francisco Chronicle praised her for making the show "a dramatic showstopper". For her performance, she was nominated for the Tony Award for Best Performance by a Leading Actress in a Musical, and won the National Broadway Touring Award and an award from the San Francisco Theatre Critics Circle. Pitre left the show in October 2003.

Pitre performed as Mrs. Lovett in Sweeney Todd with Calgary Opera in 2003. and as Annie in Annie Get Your Gun in 2005.

Pitre has released several CDs including, All My Life Has Led To This, featuring songs in English and French, Shattered, La vie en rouge (all French) and Songs My Mother Taught Me. She can also be heard on the cast recordings of Could You Wait?, a show she co-wrote with W.J. Matheson and Diane Leah, Kristina playing the role of Ulrika and Les Misérables (role of Fantine) in the Paris cast recording.

She starred as Mayor Babs Belgoody and Ma Ferd in the Toronto production of The Toxic Avenger at the Danforth Music Hall from October 2009 through January 2010 with Dancap Productions. She was on stage in summer 2010 in Love, Loss and What I Wore and finished the year to positive reviews of her performance as Toad in A Year With Frog and Toad at Lorraine Kimsa Theatre for Young People. She garnered her sixth Dora Mavor Moore Award nomination for this performance and captured Best Actress in a Musical with an inaugural Toronto Theatre Critics' Award.

Pitre is a founding artist of Theatre 20, a musical theatre company in Toronto formed by artists in 2009, and headlined their first project, a workshop of the first English translation of the French musical Les Belles Soeurs. She also performed in Theatre 20's 2011 Concert Series at the Panasonic Theatre.

On June 1, 2011, she performed a solo, self-produced, one-night, sold-out concert La Vie en Rouge at the St. Lawrence Centre for the Arts' Jane Mallett Theatre. The French album, of the same name, was recorded live, off the floor, at Number 9 Audio Group in Toronto and released in conjunction with the concert. This theatrical event was documented to video and some highlights are shared on Louise Pitre’s YouTube channel.

In July 2011, Toronto Life magazine named "Louise Pitre's musical theatre renaissance" as #12 in their "50 Reasons to Love Toronto" feature article.

In 2011 she was the host of Star Portraits on Bravo! and performing solo concerts across North America.

Pitre wrote and performed in a show about her life, On the Rocks, in 2013. During the ongoing COVID-19 pandemic restrictions, Louise sought an opportunity to stream a filmed version of On the Rocks in May 2021 through Stream Stage Productions. In 2014 she once more performed with Theatre 20, in the musical Company; the show received an unfavourable review from the Toronto Star, although Pitre's performance was praised.

In 2016 Pitre performed in London, Ontario with Brendan Wall and Emm Gryner in The Grand Theatre production of Joni Mitchell: River. Later that year, she performed with Kenneth Welsh in the show A Coal Mine Christmas at Toronto's Coal Mine Theatre.

Other musical theatre performances include Pitre’s META’s (Montreal English Theatre Awards) nominated role of Edith Piaf in the 2018 North American premiere of The Angel & The Sparrow presented at the Segal Centre for Performing Arts in Montreal under the direction of Gordon Greenberg. In the spring of 2019, she played Adult Marie van Goethem in Marie, Dancing Still; music by Stephen Flaherty and book and lyrics by Lynn Ahrens. This premiere production, directed and choreographed by Susan Stroman was presented by the 5th Avenue Theatre in Seattle, Washington. Also in the spring of 2019, Louise Pitre broke gender boundaries by playing the role of Doctor Madden (Doctor Fine) in the Toronto, Off-Mirvish production by The Musical Stage Company of Next To Normal at the CAA Theatre. In the fall of 2019, The Angel & The Sparrow was brought to Toronto by Mirvish Productions again under the direction of Gordon Greenberg and retitled Piaf/Dietrich, A Legendary Affair at which time Louise reprised her role as Edith Piaf opposite Jayne Lewis as Marlene Dietrich. In 2023 and early 2024, she portrayed Marya Dmitriyevna in the Canadian premiere of Natasha, Pierre & The Great Comet of 1812. The musical won the 2024 Toronto Theatre Awards for Outstanding Performance by an Ensemble in a Musical.

Louise portrayed Margaret in the Canadian Stage production of The Inheritance (Parts 1 & 2) for which she won 2 Toronto Theatre Awards 2024 for her performance in both a featured role and as part of the ensemble in the play.

== Theatre awards & nominations ==
Year	Award	Category	Title	Role	Result
2024	Toronto Theatre Awards	Outstanding Featured Performance of a Female or Non-Binary Role in a Play	The Inheritance (Parts 1 & 2)	Margaret	Won
2020	Dora Mavor Moore Award	Outstanding Performance in a Leading Role - Musical Theatre Division	Piaf/Dietrich	Edith Piaf	Nominated
2019	Dora Mavor Moore Award	Outstanding Performance in a Featured Role - Musical Theatre Division	Next To Normal	Doctor Madden (Doctor Fine)	Nominated
2018	METAs (Montreal English Theatre Awards)	Outstanding Lead Performance by an Actress	The Angel & The Sparrow	Edith Piaf	Nominated
2016	Critter Award (Calgary Theatre Critics’ Awards)	Best Supporting Actress in a Musical	The Little Prince	Snake	Won
2014	Jeff Award	Best Actress in a Principal Role in a Musical	Gypsy	Mama Rose	Nominated
2011	Toronto Critics Circle Award	Best Actress in a Musical	A Year With Frog and Toad	Toad	Won
2011	Dora Mavor Moore Award	Best Actress in a Musical	A Year With Frog and Toad	Toad	Nominated
2010	Dora Mavor Moore Award	Best Actress in a Musical	The Toxic Avenger	Mayor	Won
2006	Dora Mavor Moore Award	Best Actress in a Musical	Song & Dance	Lead	Nominated
2004	Barrymore Award	Outstanding Supporting Actress in a Musical	The Great Ostrovsky	Rose	Nominated
2004	Betty Mitchell Award	Best Actress in a Musical	Sweeney Todd	Mrs. Lovett	Won
2002	Tony Award	Best Performance by an Actress in a Leading Role in a Musical	Mamma Mia!	Donna	Nominated
2002	Theatre World Award	Best Actress in a Musical for Debut Performance on Broadway	Mamma Mia!	Donna	Won
2002	Outer Critics Circle Award	Outstanding Actress in a Musical	Mamma Mia!	Donna	Nominated
2002	Drama Desk Award	Outstanding Actress in a Musical	Mamma Mia!	Donna	Nominated
2001	Dora Mavor Moore Award	Best Actress in a Musical	Mamma Mia!	Donna	Won
2001	San Francisco Critics Award/National Broadway Award	Best Actress in a Musical	Mamma Mia!	Donna	Won
1994	Dora Mavor Moore Award	Best Actress in a Musical	Piaf	Piaf	Won
1989	Dora Mavor Moore Award	Best Actress in a Musical	Blood Brothers	Mrs. Johnstone	Won
(Sources: Dora Awards, Jeff Awards, Broadway World, Tony Awards, Outer Critics Circle Awards, Barrymore Awards, Theatre World Awards, METAs Louise Pitre website )

== Discography ==
=== Solo albums ===
Year	Title
2011	La vie en rouge
2004	Shattered
1998	All Of My Life Has Led To This
1995	Songs My Mother Taught Me
(Sources: Apple Music, AllMusic, Louise Pitre website)

=== Musicals; cast recording credits ===
Year	Title / Role
2013	On The Rocks / Self
2012	Mame / Mame Dennis
2009	Kristina At Carnegie Hall / Ulrika
2006	Could You Wait? / Mary
1991	Les Misérables / Fantine
(Sources: Apple Music, AllMusic, Louise Pitre website)

== See also ==
- List of Canadian musicians
- List of Canadian actors
- List of caricatures at Sardi's restaurant
