= Aluminij =

Bosnian aluminium manufacturing company

Coordinates: 43°16′40″N 17°49′20″E

Aluminij d.d.
- Trade name: Aluminij
- Formerly: Aluminij Mostar
- Type: Limited liability company
- Traded as: Aluminij d.o.o.
- Industry: Metals
- Founded: 1975
- Founder: SR Bosnia and Herzegovina
- Defunct: 2020
- Successor: Aluminij Industries
- Headquarters: Bačevići bb, Mostar, Bosnia and Herzegovina
- Products: Ingots, Billets, Slabs, Wire, Anodes
- Production output: 156,500 tons of aluminium (2016)
- Brands: Aluminij
- Services: Primary Aluminium Production
- Revenue: ▼€275.49 million (2018)
- Net income: ▼€29.3 million (2021)
- Total assets: ▼€208.28 million (2018)
- Owner: Federation of Bosnia and Herzegovina (44%) Workers and former workers (44%) Croatian Privatization Fund (12%)
- Number of employees: 19 (2026)
- Divisions: Electrolyses, Cast-house, Anode-plant
- Website: www.aluminij.ba

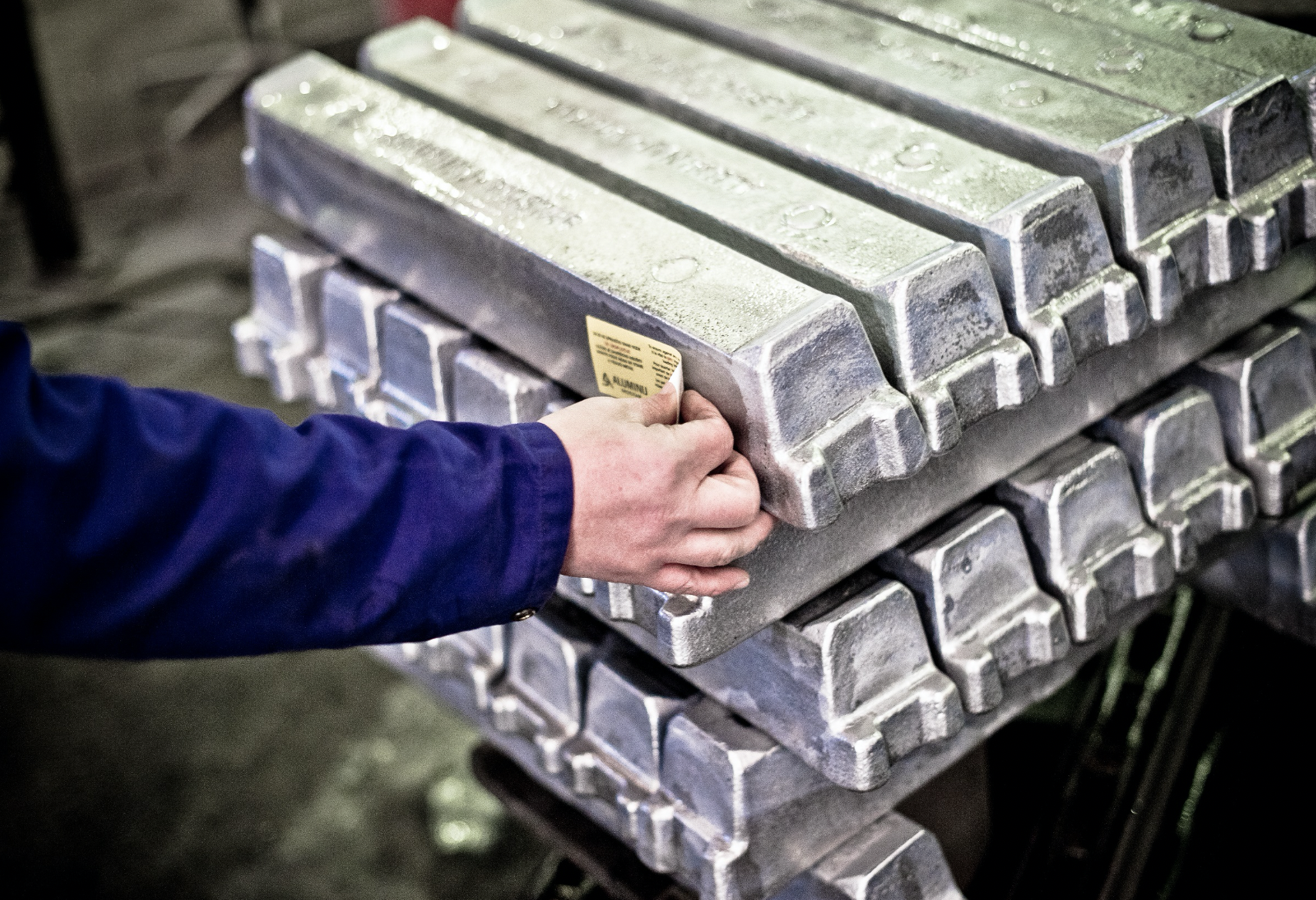
Aluminij Ingots Production

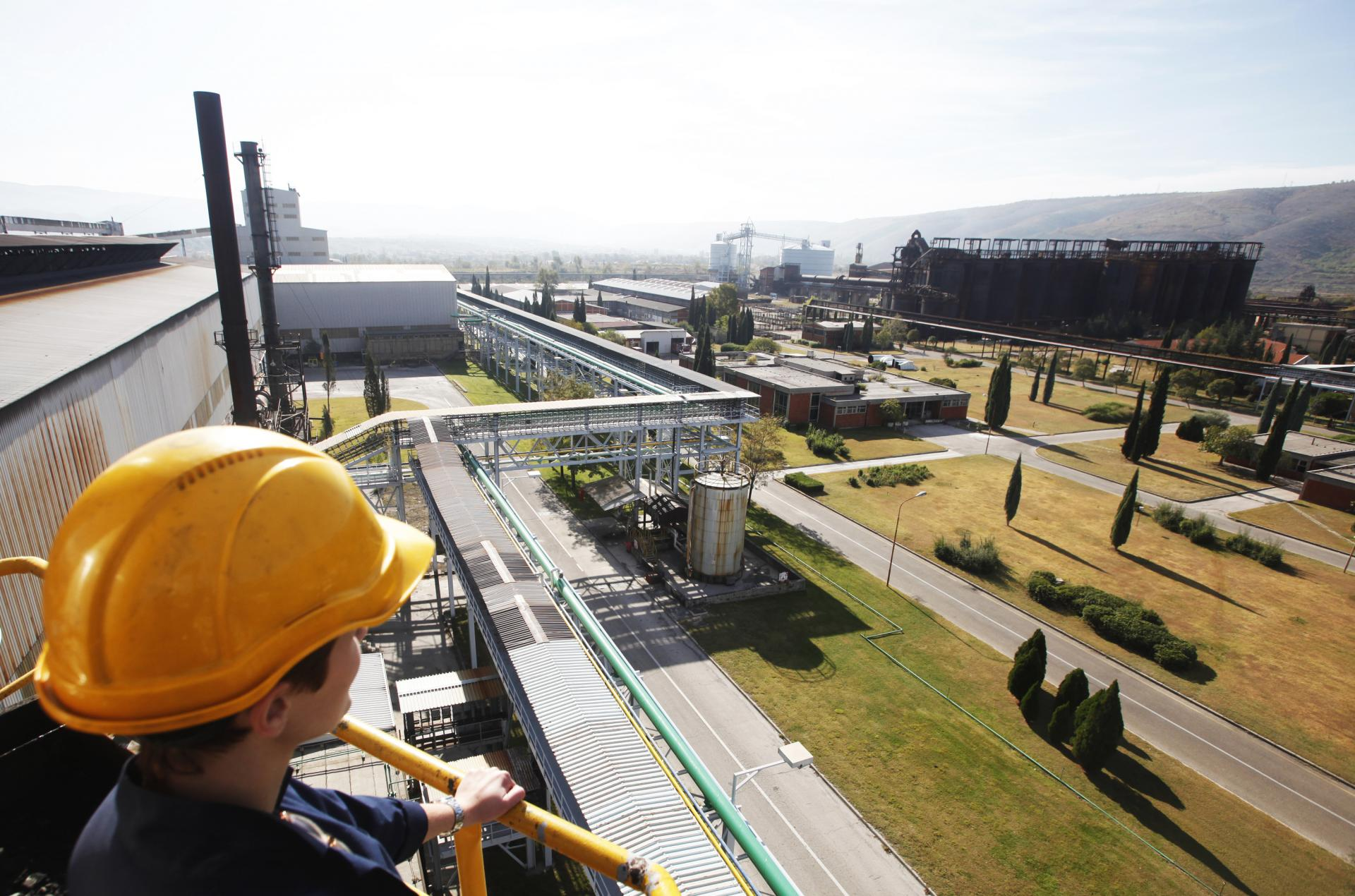
Aluminij Factory Exterior In Mostar

Aluminij d.d. was a Bosnian aluminium manufacturing company with headquarters in Mostar, Bosnia and Herzegovina. It operated from 1975 until 2020, when it was leased to the Israeli M.T. Abraham Group and since then has been operating as its subsidiary Aluminij Industries.

In 2021, Aluminij Industries was the second largest exporter in Bosnia and Herzegovina, as well as the largest importer, while in 2022, Aluminij Industries became the largest exporter, and was the second largest importer.

== History ==
The history of Aluminij began in the first years of the 20th century, with the discovery of bauxite ore deposits in Herzegovina and the subsequent exploitation of the resource. After the end of World War II in 1945, a new company was created, Bauxite Mines Mostar, with the goal of exploring, exploiting and transporting bauxite commercially. It was this first company that carried out the initial construction studies for aluminium smelters were conducted, the birth of the aluminium industry that was to come. In 1969, the bauxite Mines Mostar Company merged with Energoinvest Sarajevo to form a new organisation focused on aluminium production.

The Government of the Socialist Republic of Bosnia and Herzegovina tasked the group with maximizing the potential of the resources in the region and develops a new facility that could turn Mostar into a global aluminium producer. This was achieved by 1975, as regular aluminium production began in the new Alumina Factory. This successful development was based on cooperation between Energoinvest and the French company Pechiney. Aluminij was established in 1975 in Mostar. It soon emerged as one of the largest aluminium manufacturing companies in former Yugoslavia.

The company's facilities were largely destroyed during the 1992–1995 war in Bosnia and Herzegovina and were later rebuilt.

By the end of June 2002, an extensive modernization project for Aluminij Factory had been completed. At a cost of 250 million Euros it brought new technologies and introduced production upgrades that increased output, efficiency and quality, this allowed Aluminij Factory to remain competitive on the world stage, matching the global leading producers for quality.

In 2007, the Government of Bosnia and Herzegovina aimed to privatise Aluminij. Among the companies who placed a bid were; Alcoa, Alcan Inc., Rusal, Norsk Hydro and Swiss-based metals trader Glencore International. The Government of Bosnia and Herzegovina blocked the selloff and decided to annul the tender.

As of 2007, the company was owned 44% by the government, 44% by workers and former workers and 12% by the Croatian Privatization Fund. The government's and workers' shares are to be sold to international investors.

=== 2020 M.T. Abraham Group takover ===
In April 2020, M.T. Abraham Group took the factory under a lease for a duration of 30 years by an agreement with the Government of the Federation of Bosnia and Herzegovina, together "with its partners China Machinery Engineering Corporation (CMEC) and China Nonferrous Metal Industry’s Foreign Engineering & Construction Co., Ltd. (NFC).

In October 2020, Aluminij entered into a partnership with Advaita Group under which half of Aluminj's production would be sold to Advaita for the next ten years.

In December 2020, Aluminj signed a five-year agreement with Glencore for the supply of aluminium billets.

In March 2022, M. T. Abraham Group announced plans to build a solar power plant for electricity supply to Aluminij Industries.

On May 4, 2023, M.T. Abraham Group's Aluminij signed $141.2 million worth of deals with Glencore and Duferco. The agreements consisted of building a solar power plant, aluminium recycling facility, and a new factory for green aluminium production.

== Community ==
Mostar area alone receives an income of 40 million euros annually from Aluminij. That kind of development trend enabled investments in cultural institutions, among which are: the construction of the little scene of the Croatian National Theatre in Mostar and Aluminij Gallery. (one of the most important for the city of Mostar and the wider region).

== Partnerships ==
The partners with which Aluminij does business are renowned global companies, of which the most important are: Venture Coke Company L.L.C. (Venco-Conoco joint Venture) from the US, Glencore International AG from Switzerland, Debis International Trading GmbH, Daimler-Chrysler, Norsk Hydro ASA from Norway, Fiat from Italy, TLM-Šibenik from Croatia, China Machinery Engineering Corporation, and China Nonferrous Metal Industry's Foreign Engineering And Construction Co., Ltd.

== Market and financial data ==
In 2017, Aluminij had a revenue of 249.41 million euros and exported goods worth 171.01 million euros.

== See also ==
- List of companies of Bosnia and Herzegovina
