= Michele Ragusa =

American actress and singer

- Born: August 2, 1963 (age 63); Buffalo, New York, U.S.
- Education: Niagara University
- Occupations: Actor; singer
- Years active: 1988–present
- Website: www.micheleragusa.com

Michele Ragusa is an American actress and singer currently residing in New Jersey. She is best known for her work in Broadway musicals and her solo performances and staged concerts with Symphony Orchestras around the United States. She also played a recurring role on the television comedy Happyish.

== Personal life ==
Born in Buffalo, New York, Ragusa graduated from Holy Angels Academy and was just a few credits shy of receiving a business degree from Erie Community College when she toured the campus at Niagara University and decided to follow her dream, transferring as a theatre major. While there, she starred in a variety of roles in both dramas and musicals and also ventured outside of the university starring in two productions of Joseph and the Amazing Technicolor Dreamcoat as The Narrator at Artpark and Studio Arena Theater. She graduated with a BFA in 1987 and immediately became part of the Young Company at Studio Arena and joined Actors' Equity Association. She then moved to New York City and began working Off-Broadway and in regional productions making a name for herself as a "funny soprano." Broadway musicals soon followed as did her romance and eventual marriage to Tom Richter, Founder and Chief Forumulist of Tomr's Tonic. She has been involved with Born for Broadway, a benefit of song helping fund spinal cord injury research and supporting individuals with paralysis. She also returns to her native Buffalo to perform at Kleinhans Music Hall and also Studio Arena where her professional career began.

== Career ==
She made her Broadway debut in the 1993 original cast of Cyrano: The Musical. She went on to be featured in the original Broadway cast of Titanic in 1997 and was a replacement in the Broadway productions of Ragtime, A Class Act and Urinetown. In 2008, she replaced Megan Mullally in the starring role of Young Frankenstein. For her role in the premiere of Adrift in Macao she won a Barrymore Awards for Excellence in Theater and for a subsequent Off-Broadway production was nominated for a Drama League Award and a Lucille Lortel Award. In 2014 she performed the role of Alice Bean at Avery Fisher Hall in a one night concert of Titanic and was also featured as Madame Theodore in the Susan Stroman directed World Premiere production of Little Dancer at The Kennedy Center. Beginning in November 2021, Michele originated the role of Austin in Flying Over Sunset, at Lincoln Center, conceived, written, and directed by James Lapine. She has also sung with major symphony orchestras around the US including Kansas City Symphony, Oklahoma City Symphony Orchestra, Detroit Symphony Orchestra, Buffalo Philharmonic Orchestra and Chattanooga Symphony and Opera. In addition to Broadway theatre and symphony orchestras she works extensively in regional theatre She has co-starred with Tony Award winner Roger Bart, renowned award winning actress Elaine Stritch, Robert Cuccioli and American Idol Justin Guarini

=== Other stage credits ===
- 1992: The Sheik of Avenue B (as Sally Small) • The Town Hall (New York City)
- 2003: Me and My Girl (as Lady Jacqueline Carstone) • Goodspeed Musicals
- 2004: She Loves Me (as Amalia Balash) • Paper Mill Playhouse
- 2004: Tom Jones Musical (as Mrs. Fitzpatrick) • North Shore Music Theatre American Premiere
- 2005: The Audience (as Catlin) • Transport Group
- 2009: And the World Goes 'Round (as Liza and others) • Pittsburgh Public Theater
- 2009: Into the Woods (as The Witch) • Kansas City Repertory Theatre
- 2009: The Full Monty (as Vicki Nichols) • Paper Mill Playhouse
- 2011: For The Boys (as Dixie Leonard) • Marriott Theatre
- 2012: Company (as Sarah) • Geva Theatre Center
- 2013: Disaster! (as Jackie) • St. Luke's Theatre
- 2013: Spamalot (as The Lady of the Lake) • The Muny
- 2013: Gypsy (as Mama Rose) • Hangar Theatre
- 2014: Craving For Travel (as Joanne) • Peter Jay Sharp Theater
- 2014: The Cottage (as Marjorie) • Theatre Aspen
- 2015: Mary Poppins (as Winnifred Banks) • Kansas City Starlight
- 2015: The Drowsy Chaperone (as The Chaperone) • Cape Playhouse
- 2015: The King and I (as Anna) • Maltz Jupiter Theatre
- 2016: Hello, Dolly! (as Dolly Gallagher Levi) • Riverside Theatre
- 2016: Cake Off (as Rita) • Bucks County Playhouse
- 2017: Mame (as Mame Dennis) • Riverside Theatre

== Discography ==
Studio album

- Sweet Bye and Bye (2011, PS Classics)

Original Cast recordings

- ’’Flying Over Sunset’’ (Sony 2022)
- Titanic (1997, Masterworks Broadway)
- Adrift in Macao (2007, Melnikov Music)

Other appearances

- Lost Broadway and More, Vol. 3 (2010, Original Cast)
