= The Private Life of a Masterpiece =

- Genre: Art documentary
- Narrated by: Samuel West; Tim Pigott-Smith
- Country of origin: United Kingdom
- Original language: English
- No. of series: 5
- No. of episodes: 29

Production
- Running time: 50 minutes
- Production company: BBC Cymru Wales

Original release
- Network: BBC Two
- Release: 8 December 2001 – 25 December 2010

The Private Life of a Masterpiece is a BBC arts documentary series which tells the stories behind great works of art; 29 episodes of the series were broadcast on BBC Two, commencing on 8 December 2001 and ending on 25 December 2010. It initially ran for five seasons from 8 December 2001 to 17 April 2006, for a total of 22 episodes; each episode was 50 minutes long. A seven-DVD box set of the first five series was released in 2007, which re-arranged the documentaries into genres from art history. A further seven episodes were broadcast between 24 December 2006 and 25 December 2010. The series has been widely broadcast around the world, often in re-voiced into national languages. The original narrations were done by the actor Samuel West. Works of art featured range from Michelangelo's David for the first episode to Filippo Lippi's Adoration of the Christ Child for the last.

The series was produced by independent TV production company Fulmar Television & Film, based in Cardiff. The series producer, who also devised the concept of the programme, was Jeremy Bugler.

The series was well received by art and television critics. The Times' David Chater placed it at Number 30 in his paper's Top 50 TV shows of the Noughties.

== Episodes ==
Series 1 (2001)

- Edvard Munch: The Scream : 8 December 2001
- Michelangelo: David : 15 December 2001

Series 2 (2002)

- Édouard Manet: Le déjeuner sur l'herbe : 18 January 2003
- Diego Velázquez: The Rokeby Venus : 25 January 2003

Series 3 (2004)

- Auguste Rodin: The Kiss : 19 January 2004
- Francisco Goya: The Third of May 1808 : 26 January 2004
- Auguste Renoir: Bal au moulin de la Galette, Montmartre : 2 February 2004
- Rembrandt van Rijn: The Night Watch : 9 February 2004
- Sandro Botticelli: La Primavera : 23 February 2004
- Katsushika Hokusai: The Great Wave : 17 April 2004
- Edgar Degas: Little Dancer Aged Fourteen : 24 April 2004
- Vincent van Gogh: Sunflowers : 1 May 2004
- Pablo Picasso: Les Demoiselles d'Avignon : 15 May 2004
- James McNeill Whistler: Whistler's Mother : 22 May 2004

Series 4 (2005)

- Eugène Delacroix: Liberty Leading the People : 2 April 2005
- Johannes Vermeer: The Art of Painting : 9 April 2005
- Paolo Uccello: The Battle of San Romano : 16 April 2005
- Georges Seurat: A Sunday Afternoon on the Island of La Grande Jatte: 23 April 2005
- Gustav Klimt: The Kiss : 30 April 2005

The Private Life of an Easter Masterpiece (2006)

- Leonardo da Vinci: The Last Supper : 13 April 2006
- Salvador Dalí: Christ of Saint John of the Cross : 14 April 2006
- Piero della Francesca: The Resurrection : 17 April 2006

The Private Life of a Christmas Masterpiece (2006)

- Jan van Eyck: The Annunciation : 24 December 2006
- Pieter Bruegel the Elder: Census at Bethlehem : 25 December 2006
- Paul Gauguin: God's Child : 26 December 2006

The Private Life of an Easter Masterpiece (2009)

- Caravaggio: The Taking of Christ : 11 April 2009

The Private Life of a Christmas Masterpiece (2009)

- Sandro Botticelli: The Mystic Nativity : 25 December 2009

The Private Life of an Easter Masterpiece (2010)

- Rogier van der Weyden: The Descent from the Cross : 3 April 2010

The Private Life of a Christmas Masterpiece (2010)

- Filippo Lippi: The Adoration of the Christ Child : 25 December 2010
