= Little Dancer of Fourteen Years =

Sculpture by Edgar Degas

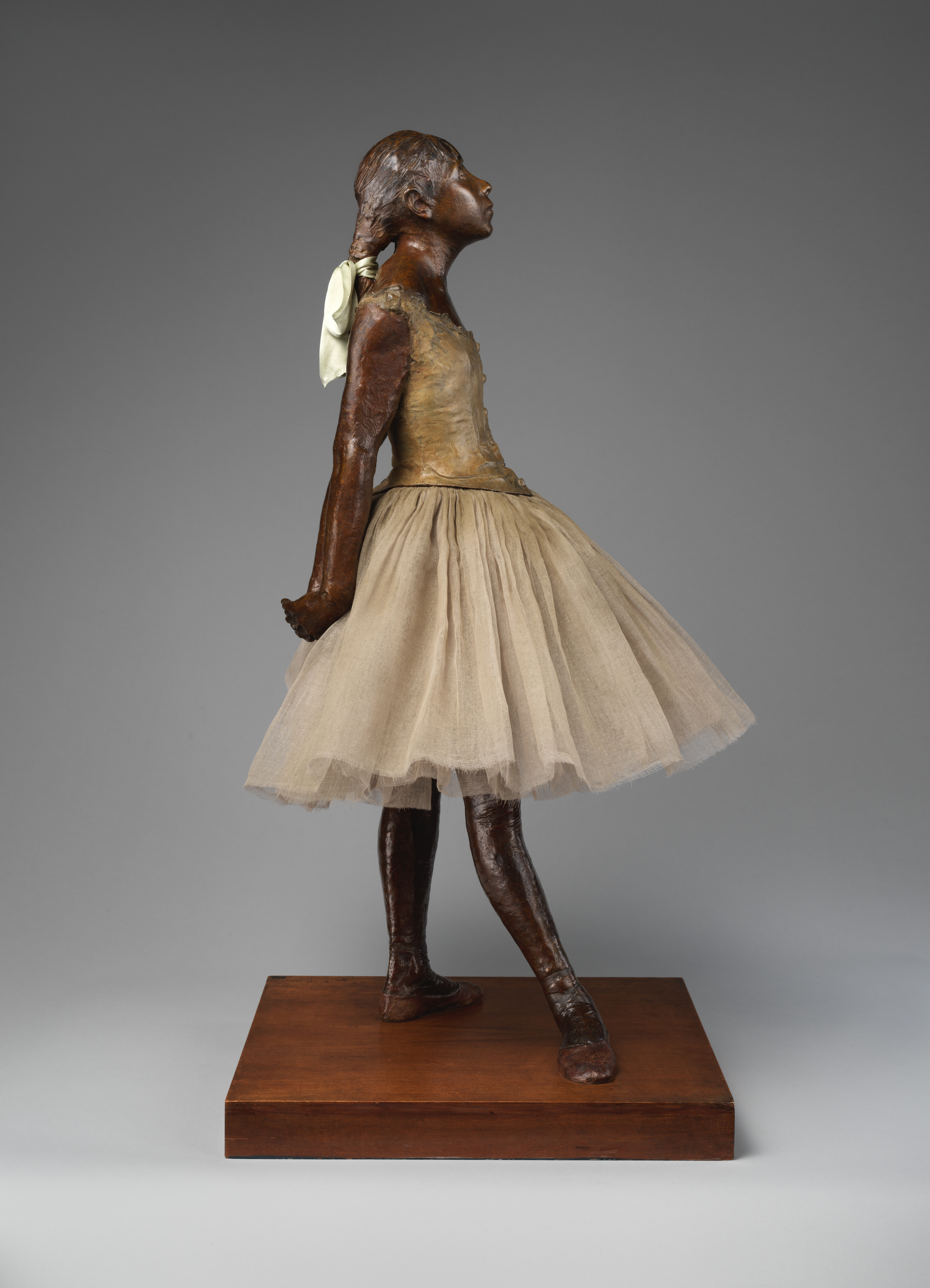
- The Metropolitan Museum of Art's bronze casting, with a restored tutu from 2018
- Year: c.1880
- Medium: bronze, ribbon, tulle
- Dimensions: 98 cm (39 in)
- Location: Metropolitan Museum of Art, Musée d'Orsay, National Gallery of Art
- Accession: 1985.64.62

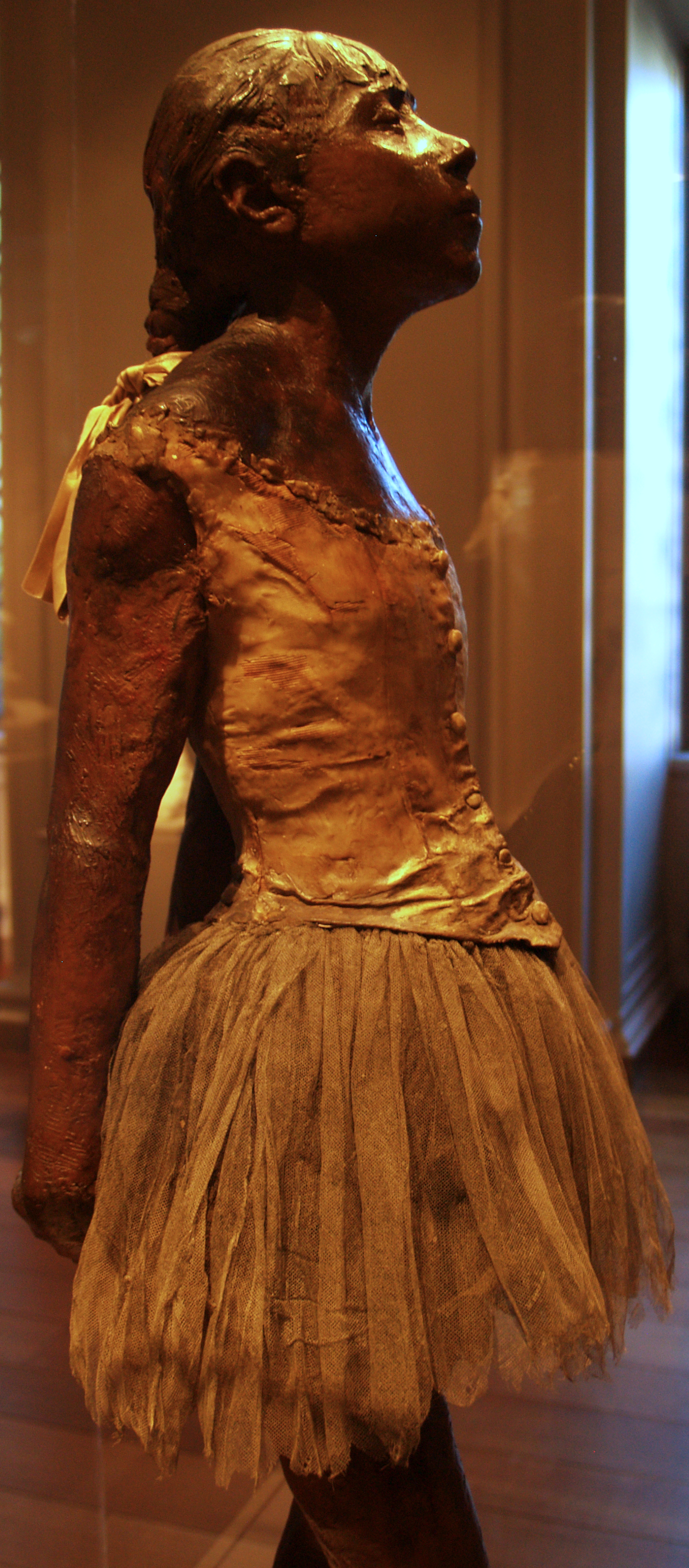
The original wax sculpture at the National Gallery of Art, Washington, D.C.

The Little Fourteen-Year-Old Dancer (French: La Petite Danseuse de Quatorze Ans) is a sculpture begun c. 1880 by Edgar Degas of a young student of the Paris Opera Ballet dance school, a Belgian named Marie van Goethem.

== Description ==
The sculpture is two-thirds life size and was originally sculpted in wax, an unusual choice of medium for the time. The sculpture exhibited in 1881 was dressed in a real bodice, tutu and ballet slippers and a wig of human hair. All but the hair, ribbon, and tutu were coated in wax.

There are at least 28 bronze casts of this sculpture that appear in museums and galleries around the world today. After Degas' death his family commissioned the founding company Hébrard to make these replicas. The tutus worn by the bronzes vary from museum to museum.

The exact relationship between Marie van Goethem and Edgar Degas is a matter of debate. Another version of the statue is a nude, currently on display side by side with the 1881 Exhibition wax original at the National Gallery in Washington DC. Although the public reacted negatively to the nudity of Degas' young model, as implied by his statue's real and removable clothing, Degas was never conclusively in a sexual relationship.

Realistic wax figures with real hair and real clothes had also been popular in religious, Folk, and fine arts for centuries before Degas created his Little Dancer.

The arms are taut, and the legs and feet are placed in a ballet position akin to fourth position at rest, and there is tension in the pose, an image of a ballerina being put through her paces, not posing in an angelic way. Her face is – "contorted, people thought it was a deliberate image of ugliness, but you could also say it's the image of a sickly gawky adolescent who is being made to do something she doesn't totally want to do."

== History ==
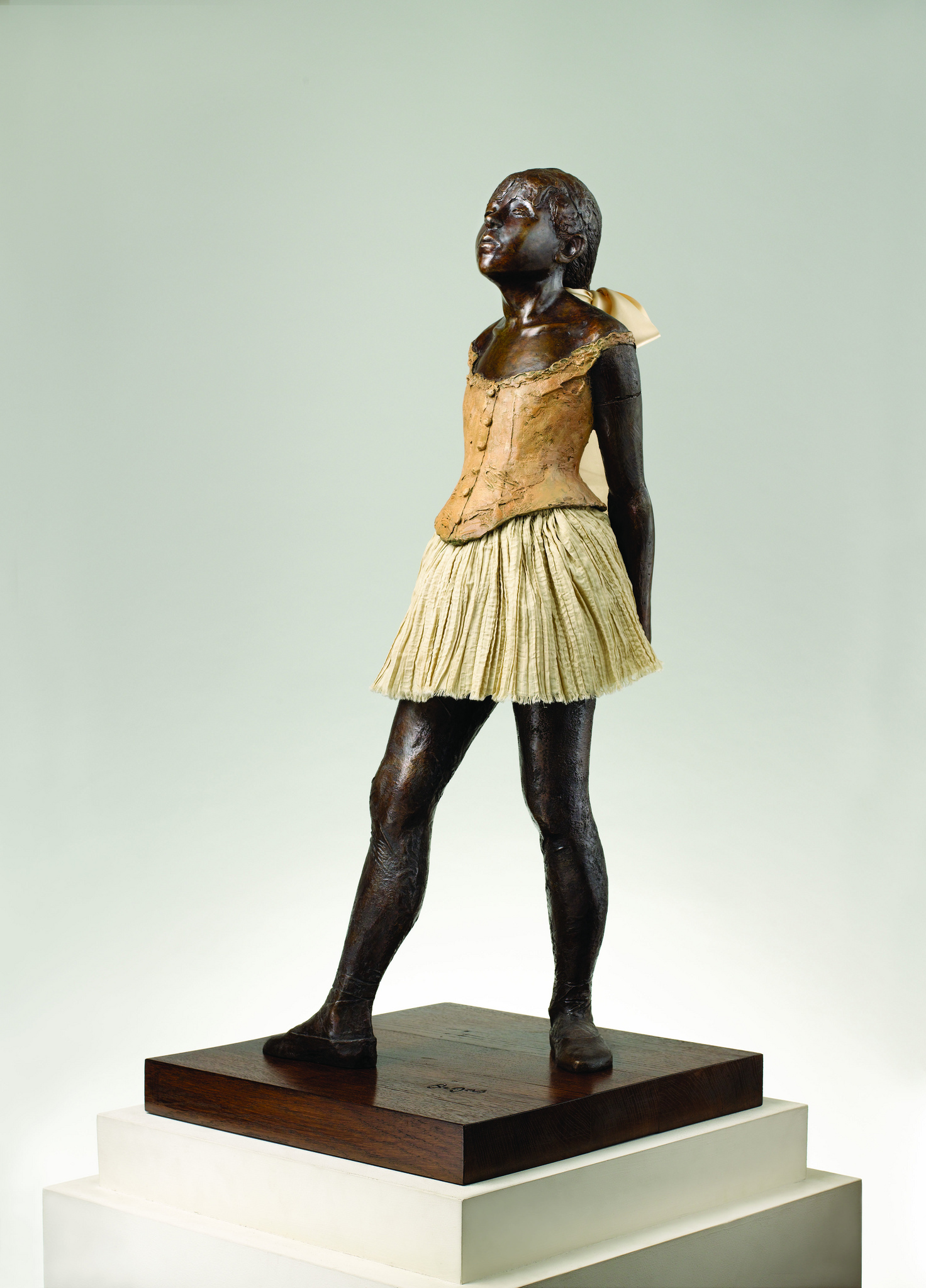
Angle from "The Complete Sculptures of Edgar Degas" collection at M.T. Abraham Foundation, cast in 1997. Note the varying tutu.

When the La Petite Danseuse de Quatorze Ans was shown in Paris at the Sixth Impressionist Exhibition of 1881, it received mixed reviews. Joris-Karl Huysmans called it "the first truly modern attempt at sculpture I know." Certain critics were shocked by the piece, and the dancer was compared to a monkey and a Mexica. One critic, Paul Mantz, called her the "flower of precocious depravity," with a face "marked by the hateful promise of every vice" and "bearing the signs of a profoundly heinous character." Comparisons with older art were made, perhaps partly because it was exhibited in a glass case, like classical sculpture in the Louvre, and was dressed in wig and clothes.

After Degas' death, his heirs (brother and sister's children) made the decision to have the bronze repetitions of La Petite Danseuse and other wax and mixed-media sculptures cast. The casting took place at the Hébrard foundry in Paris from 1920 until 1936 when the Hébrard foundry went bankrupt and closed. Thereafter, "Hébrard" Degas Little Dancer bronzes were cast at the Valsuani foundry in Paris until the mid-1970s. Sixty-nine of Degas' wax sculptures survived the casting process. One copy of La Petite Danseuse is currently owned by the creator and owner of Auto Trader, John Madejski. He stated that he bought the sculpture by accident. That copy was sold for £13,257,250 ($19,077,250) at Sotheby's on 3 February 2009. Another Hébrard Little Dancer bronze failed to sell at a November 2011 auction at Christie's.

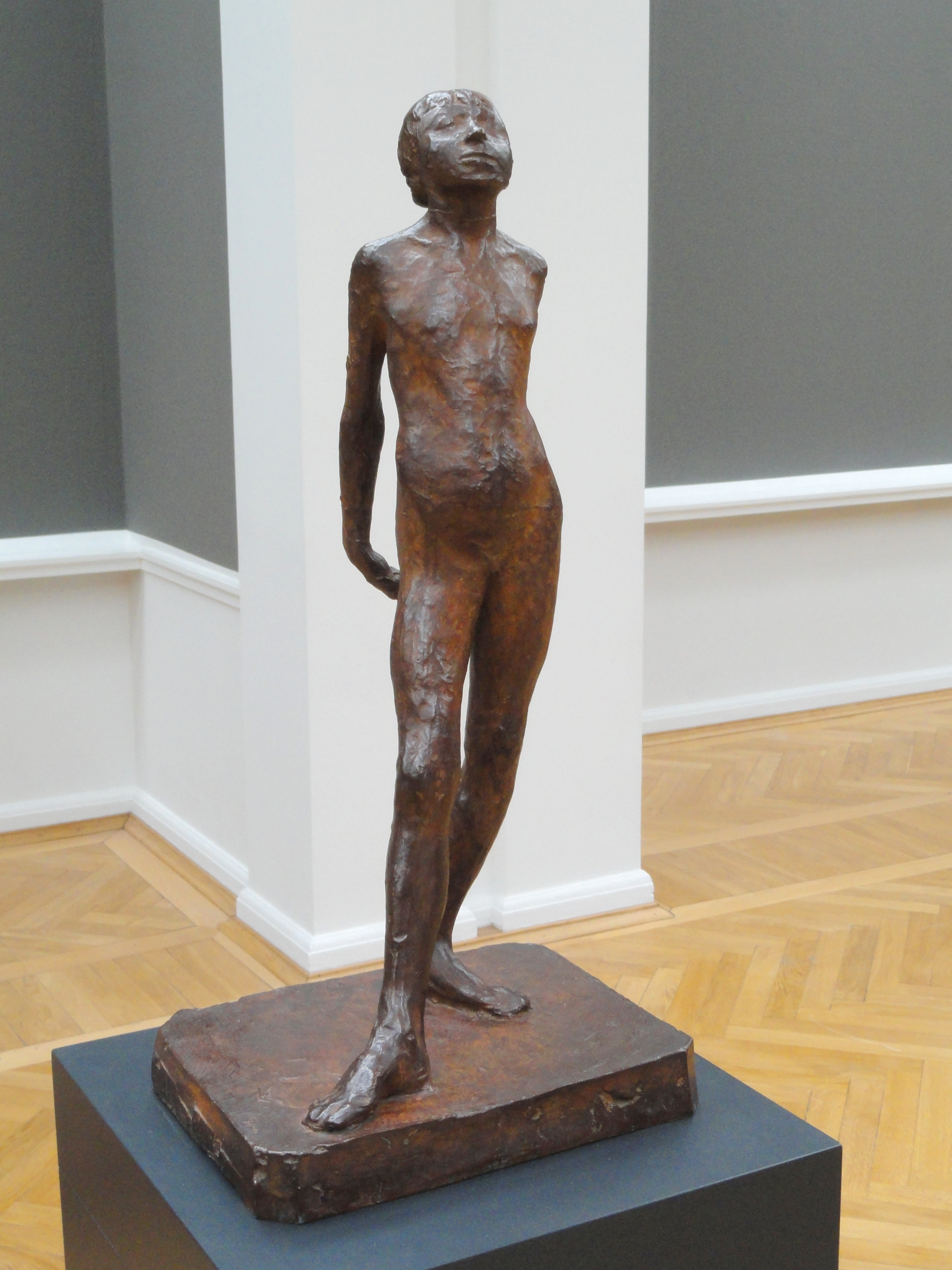
Cast of "Etude du nu pour la Petite danseuse de Quatorze ans" by Degas exhibited in the Ny Carlsberg Glyptotek, Dantes Plads 7, Copenhagen, Denmark.

To construct the statue, Degas used pigmented beeswax, with a metal armature, rope, and paintbrushes covered by clay for structural support.

The Little Dancer wax sculpture we see today is a reworked version of the original sculpture that was shown in 1881. After seeing the wax sculpture in Degas’ living quarters in April 1903, the New York collector Louisine Havemeyer expressed interest in buying the wax. After proposing a bronze or wax cast of the sculpture, which Mrs. Havemeyer refused, Degas took his wax figure upstairs to his working studio and told Vollard he was reworking the sculpture for Havemeyer for 40,000 francs. Degas never sold the sculpture to Mrs. Havemeyer. After Degas died, it was found in a corner of his studio. Paul Lefond, Degas’ biographer, described the Little Dancer wax after Degas’ death as "nothing but a ruin;" and Mary Cassatt telegraphed Mrs. Havemeyer "Statue Bad Condition." However, the wax sculpture we know today is not a ruin. It is Degas' reworked second version of his wax figure. At some point before Degas extensively reworked his sculpture, he allowed a plaster to be cast from the wax figure. This recently re-discovered plaster records the Little Dancer’s original pose, bodice, and hairdo. The plaster is now in a private collection in the United States.

The original wax sculpture was acquired by Paul Mellon in 1956. Beginning in 1985, Mr and Mrs Mellon gave the National Gallery of Art 49 Degas waxes, 10 bronzes and 2 plasters, the largest group of original Degas sculptures. Little Dancer was among the bequests. In 1997, the Airaindor-Valsuani foundry in France began casting a limited edition of Degas bronzes from the pre-1903 Little Dancer plaster. One such Little Dancer bronze is owned by the M.T. Abraham Foundation, which, at times, is lent to other institutions and museums including the State Hermitage Museum in Saint Petersburg, Russia. Like the various states of many of Degas' prints, the Valsuani bronzes record the first version of Degas' Little Dancer, while the Hébrard casts record the second and final state of the sculpture.

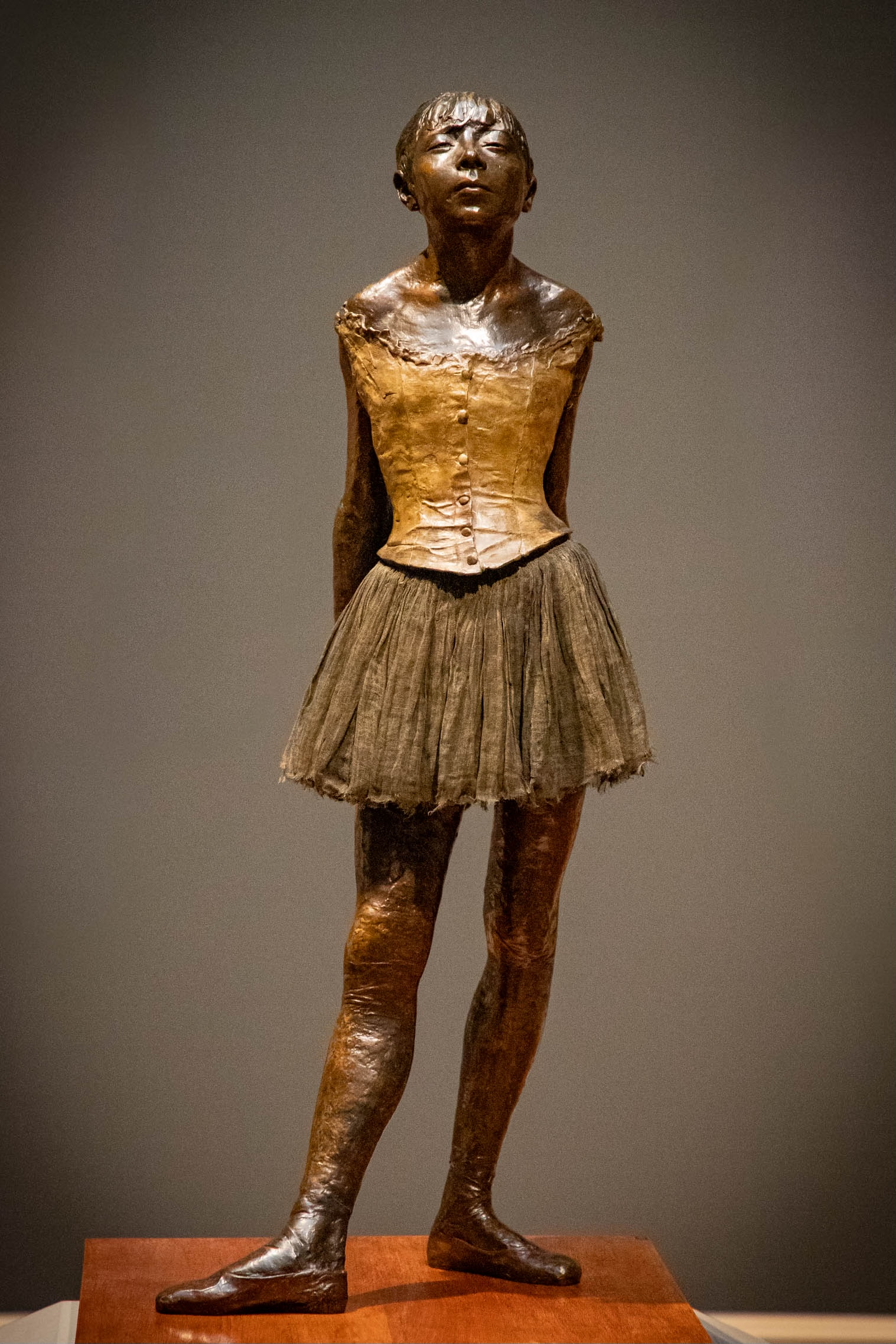
Impressionist sculpture of The Little Dancer of Fourteen Years by Edgar Degas on display at the St. Louis Art Museum.

== Cultural references ==
In 1998, art historian Richard Kendall published a scholarly account of the history of Degas's sculpture, Degas and the Little Dancer, with contributions by Douglas Druick and Arthur Beale.

A 2003 ballet with choreography by Patrice Bart and music by Denis Levaillant, La Petite Danseuse de Degas, was premiered by the Paris Opera.

The 2004 BBC Two documentary The Private Life of a Masterpiece: Little Dancer Aged Fourteen closely examines the sculpture, the model, the circumstances of her life, and the critical reaction to the work.

In 2014, the Kennedy Center for the Performing Arts in Washington, D.C. premiered the stage musical, Little Dancer, inspired by the story of the young ballerina immortalized by Edgar Degas in his famous sculpture. In March 2019 a reworked version of the musical, now called Marie, Dancing Still premiered at the 5th Avenue Theater in Seattle. Tiler Peck, principal dancer of New York City Ballet, led the cast and Susan Stroman was the director and choreographer for the production.

== In popular culture ==
The sculpture is prominently featured in the 1993 thriller film Malice.

It appears in the art gallery of the Feet scene in the Baby Einstein video, "Baby da Vinci: From Head to Toe".

It appears in the 2007 Little Einsteins episode, "The Wind-Up Toy Prince".

It makes a cameo in the 2009 fantasy comedy film Night at the Museum: Battle of the Smithsonian.

The 2013 novel The Painted Girls by Cathy Marie Buchanan centers upon the life of Marie van Goethem, the model for this piece. It traces the statue's development over several years, and considers how Marie may have reacted to its appearance. Buchanan draws parallels between Degas' work, the criminal theories of Cesare Lombroso, and the stage adaptation of Émile Zola's L'Assommoir.

It has recently been featured in the 2020 Netflix drama series Tiny Pretty Things, and in the 2022 HBO original series The Gilded Age, episode Irresistible Change.
