= Baćevići =

Bačevići
- Village
- Location within Bosnia and Herzegovina
- Coordinates: 43°15′54″N 17°49′17″E
- Country: Bosnia and Herzegovina
- Entity: Federation of Bosnia and Herzegovina
- Canton: Herzegovina-Neretva
- Municipality: Mostar

Area
  - Total: 9.54 sq mi (24.72 km^{2})

Population (2013)
  - Total: 492
  - Density: 51.5/sq mi (19.9/km^{2})
- Time zone: UTC+1 (CET)
  - Summer (DST): UTC+2 (CEST)
- Postal code: 88000

Bačevići is a populated settlement in the Mostar municipality, just south of the city of Mostar, Bosnia and Herzegovina, making it a suburb. It is 10 km (6.2 mi) from Mostar, 139 km (86 mi) from Sarajevo, 125 km (78 mi) from Dubrovnik and 170 km (110 mi) from Split.

== Demographics ==
According to the 2013 census, its population was 492.

Ethnicity in 2013
Ethnicity	Number	Percentage
Croats	254	51.6%
Serbs	238	48.4%
Total	492	100%
