= Vladimir Sterligov =

Russian painter

- Владимир Стерлигов
- Born: 18 March 1904; Warsaw, Congress Poland, Russian Empire
- Died: 1 November 1973 (aged 69)
- Occupations: Artist; poet

Vladimir Vasilievich Sterligov (Russian: Владимир Васильевич Стерлигов; 18 March 1904 – 1 November 1973) was a Soviet avant garde painter and poet, considered by art professionals to be the last of the Soviet Avant-garde artists. A former student of Kazimir Malevich, he succeeded in stepping beyond the boundary of Suprematism, creating a new and original system.
