= Two on the Aisle =

Musical revue by Betty Comden, Adolph Green and Jule Styne

- Music: Jule Styne
- Lyrics: Betty Comden; Adolph Green
- Book: Betty Comden; Adolph Green
- Premiere: July 19, 1951; 73 years ago: Mark Hellinger Theatre
- Productions: 1951 Broadway

Two on the Aisle is a musical revue with a book and lyrics by Betty Comden and Adolph Green and music by Jule Styne.

The project marked Comden and Green's return to Broadway following their successful reign at MGM (where they penned the classic Singin' in the Rain and The Band Wagon, among others) and their first teaming with composer Styne. An evening of comedy routines and splashy musical numbers with Las Vegas-type showgirls, it was developed specifically to showcase the talents of Bert Lahr.

After one preview, the show, directed by Abe Burrows, and choreographed by Ron Fletcher, opened on July 19, 1951 at the Mark Hellinger Theatre, where it ran for 276 performances. The marquee is shown briefly at 37 min 46 seconds into the movie, Pat and Mike. In addition to Lahr, the cast included Dolores Gray and Stanley Prager. Lahr and Gray disliked each other, with the trouble starting in New Haven. The lead spot (number 3 in the show) for the first star was given to Lahr, but Gray argued that she should have it; the director Burrows settled the matter by threatening to quit. The show became notorious for their efforts to upstage each other.

An original cast album was released by Decca Records.

== Song list ==
- Show Train
- Hold Me, Hold Me, Hold Me
- East River Hoe Down (Here She Comes Now)
- There Never Was a Baby Like My Baby
- If You Hadn't, But You Did
- The Clown
- Vaudeville Ain't Dead/Catch Our Act at the Met
- Everlasting
- Give a Little, Get a Little
- How Will He Know?
