= The Girl in 14G =

Song by Jeanine Tesori and Dick Scanlan

"The Girl in 14G" is a contemporary song by Jeanine Tesori and Dick Scanlan written for and best known being performed by Kristin Chenoweth. It is based on a real-life experience with Chenoweth first moving to New York City living with loud and noisy neighbors below and above getting each other to be quiet. The song is featured on Chenoweth's 2001 debut studio album Let Yourself Go. It featured elements from the opera Tristan und Isolde, the Queen of the Night's aria from The Magic Flute, as well as Swan Lake.

== Story ==
According to Chenoweth's 2008 autobiography A Little Bit Wicked, Chenoweth wanted her first album to have a 1930s vibe. Chenoweth shared a story of her experience first moving to New York City in an apartment living with a cellist directly below her and a warbling soprano living right above her. When they all would practice their music, they would bang on the ceiling or the floor getting each other to shut up. In the song, the girl first arrives in peace in Apartment 14G but gets distracted by an "Opera Wannabe" below in 13G and a "Jazz Singer" above in 15G. For the remainder of her stay, it was nonstop noise.

Chenoweth was originally working with Tesori and Scanlan doing the workshops for the musical adaptation of Thoroughly Modern Millie. At the same time, she was working on her first solo album and got Sony Classical to commission Tesori and Scanlan to write the song for Chenoweth based on her early New York City experience.

Chenoweth has performed it at most of her concerts (including Carnegie Hall, Walt Disney Concert Hall, and the Metropolitan Opera) and on television appearances.
