= Seán Martin Hingston =

Australian actor (born 1965)

- Born: 16 December 1965 (age 60); Melbourne, Australia
- Other names: Sean Martin Hingston, Sean Hingston
- Website: http://www.SeanMartinHingston.com

Seán Martin Hingston (from Melbourne, Australia) is a New York-based actor, singer and dancer who shot to prevalence for his portrayal of 3 distinct characters in each of the three short stories that make up the Tony Awarding winning Best Musical of 2000, contact.

Two years out of high school and with a year of shows at Melbourne's Swagman Theater Restaurant under his belt, Hingston joined the original Australian cast of "Cats" as a vacation swing in 1986, taking over the roles of Plato/Macavity and eventually Munkustrap over three years with that show. Direcrtor/Choregrapher, Graeme Murphy, of Sydney Dance Company fame, cast Hingston in the 1988 Australian revival of "Man of La Mancha". Next came the 1989 Australian production of "42nd St" where Hingston was understudy for "Billy Lawler". In 1988 Hingston formed a personal relationship with Ignatius Jones with whom he and Drew Anthony would perform as "The Fabulous Rhythm Boys", adding vocal harmony and tap dancing to his 30s style cabaret bands, Jalousie, and Pardon Me Boys. Hingston and Anthony parlayed these skills into their own cabaret act, adding Leonie Page to form a vocal/tap trio with 5 piece band. The Fabulous Rhythm Boy performed regular a Sydney venues, The Real Ale Cafe and on Ray Martin's Midday Show on GTV9 winning the audience award at the 1989 Gold Coast Jazz Festival.

In 1992 Hingston left Australia for NYC and in 1994 was cast in the Broadway Production of "Crazy For You". From 1992 - 1996 Hingston worked with Broadway legend Gwen Verdon and choreographer Chet Walker on pre-production for what would become the musical "Fosse". Hingston left "Crazy For You" for a 40 city American tour of The Musical of Andrew Lloyd Webber in which he sang The Phantom opposite Sarah Brightman culminating in a run at Radio City Music Hall.. In 1998 Hingston toured with Chita Rivera in "Chita, and All That Jazz!" a concert starring the Broadway great supported by 6 men. Hingston made his Carnegie Hall debut in Sondheim, Etc.: Bernadette Peters Live at Carnegie Hall (1997) and appears on the live Album of that concert. That same year Hingston was cast as Peter Allen in the original Sydney Workshop of "The Boy From Oz", after which he returned to NYC to star in "contact" at Lincoln Center Theatre. During the run of "contact" Sean played Sir Galahad in NY City Center's "Connecticut Yankee..." to rave reviews. Hingston was a vacation replacement in Kander and Ebb's "Curtains" (Bobby Pepper) on Broadway. In the 2010 Broadway revival of "Promises, Promises" starring Sean Hayes and Kristin Chenoweth, Sean played Mr Eichedlberger. From 2004 - 2010 Hingston toured the concert halls of America supporting Kristin Chenoweth playing The Met, Carnegie Hall, Walt Disney Hall and The Kennedy Center, with various orchestras including Marvin Hamlisch National Symphony Orchestra Pops and Boston Pops conducted by Keith Lockhart.

Regionally Hingston was cast in the 2003 world Premier of Paula Vogel's play The Long Christmas Ride Home" , at Trinity Repertory in Providence RI. In 2004 Hingston created the role of George M Cohan in a new stage adaptation of the movie musical "Yankee Doodle Dandy" at Seattle 5th Ave Theater. In "Cole Porter's The Pirate" at Philadelphia's Prince Theater Hingston recreated the role first played by Gene Kelly in the movie musical "The Pirate", opposite Andrea Burns in the Judy Garland Role of "Manuela". In 2005 Sean played Gene Kelly in a new play about the making of Singing in the Rain, "What a Glorious Feeling" at Mason St Warehouse, Saugatuck MI. At Los Angeles Reprise Series of musicals Hingston played Bill Calhoun in "Kiss Me Kate" as was nominated for an Ovation Award, for LA theater, for his performance.

IN 2012 Terrence Mann directed Hingston as the Pirate King in "The Pirates of Penzance" at Connecticut Repertory Theater in 2014 Hingston was critically acclaimed for his performance as reformed alcoholic Bernard in American Repertory Theater world premier play "The Shapes She Makes", By Jonathon Bernstein and Susan Misner. Tony Award-winning choreographer Christopher Gattelli directed and choreographed Hingston in the dance theater piece "In Your Arms" at Vassar College, which starred Robert Morse and Debbie Gravitte. Hingston created the role of Phillipe in the new Ahrens and Flaherty musical "Little Dancer", directed and choreographed by Susan Stroman for The Kennedy Center for Performing Arts in Washington D.C.

== Filmography ==
=== Film ===
Year	Title	Role	Notes
2007	Across The Universe	Dancer	
2005	The Producers	Auditioner / Tapping Brown Shirt / Prisoners of Love Dancer	
2004	Beyond the Sea	Dancer	
2000	Center Stage	Jazz Class Dancer	

=== Television ===
2019	High Maintenance Ep 402	Oscar	1 Episode
2015	Difficult People	Richard	1 episode, web television, (billed as Sean Hingston)
2014	It Could Be Worse	Craigslister	1 episode
2007	The Bronx Is Burning	Steve Dunleavy	2 episodes
2001	Law & Order: Criminal Intent	Dingo	1 episode
2000	One Life to Live	Crocodile Hunter	1 episode
1999	Sex and the City	David Shoffer	1 episode

== Awards and nominations ==
During the 2011 he was nominated for Featured Actor in a Musical for the role of Bill Calhoun/Lucentio in the Reprise Theatre Company production of "Kiss Me, Kate"
