= Sarah Kucserka =

American television producer and writer (born 1976)

- Born: September 8, 1976 (age 49)
- Occupations: Television producer, television writer
- Years active: 1999–present

Sarah Anne Kucserka (born September 8, 1976) is an American television producer and writer.

Her credits include High Fidelity (TV series), Mercy, Brothers & Sisters, GCB and Hart of Dixie. In 2007, she won a Writers Guild of America, West Award for her work on the series Ugly Betty, sharing the award with the writing staff. She is a frequent collaborator with fellow producer/writer Veronica West.

In addition to her television writing and producing work, she has also (in various ways) assisted in the production of the films Venom and Cursed, and the television series Glory Days and Wasteland, all of which are works of screenwriter Kevin Williamson.
