= Brad Beyer =

American actor

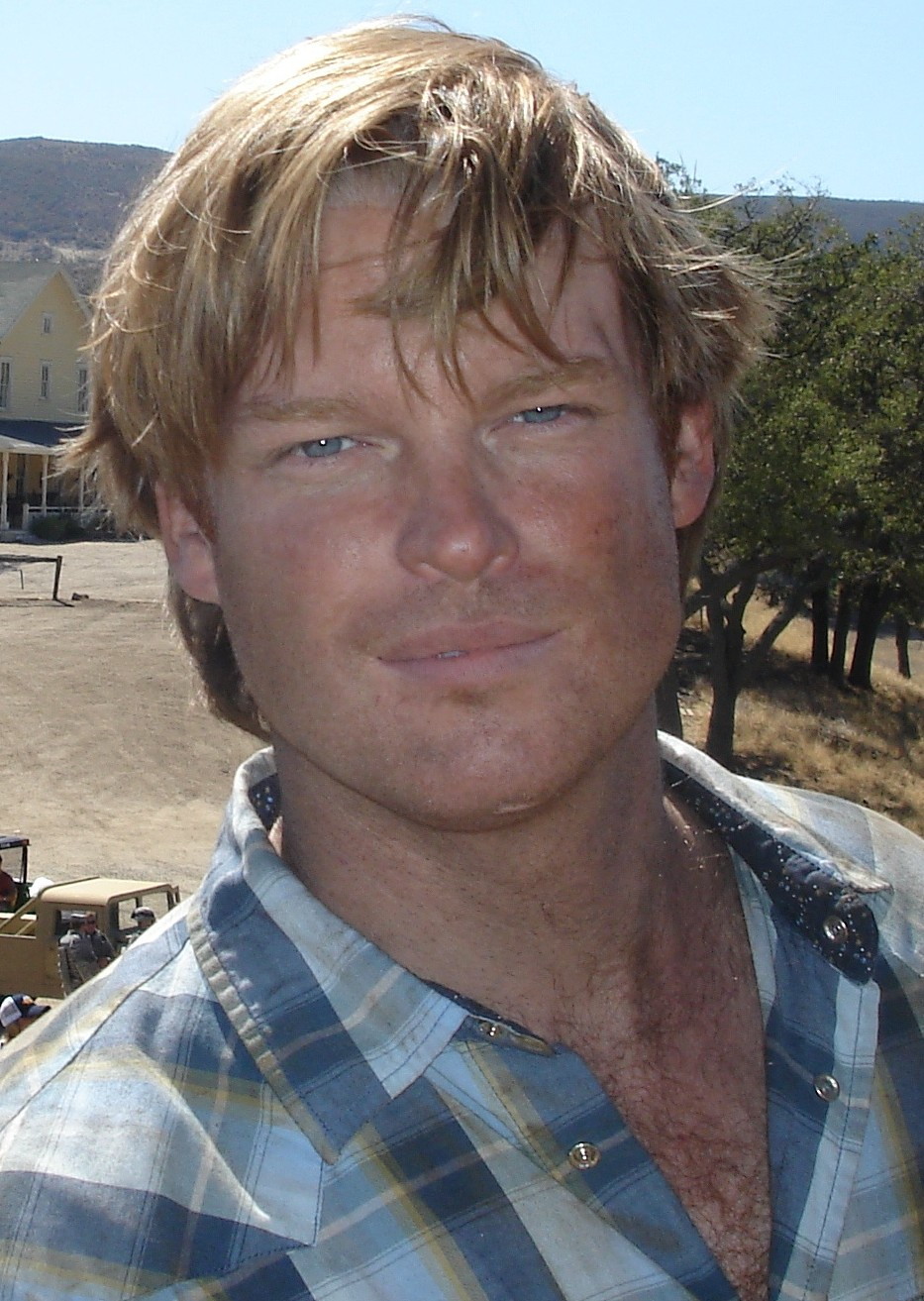
- Beyer on the set of Jericho
- Born: 1973 or 1974 (age 52–53)
- Occupation: Actor
- Years active: 1996–present

Brad Beyer (born 20 September 1973) is an American actor. He played Stanley Richmond in the CBS series Jericho.

== Personal life ==
Beyer graduated from Catholic Memorial High School in Waukesha, Wisconsin. He attended the University of Minnesota and moved to Los Angeles.

== Career ==
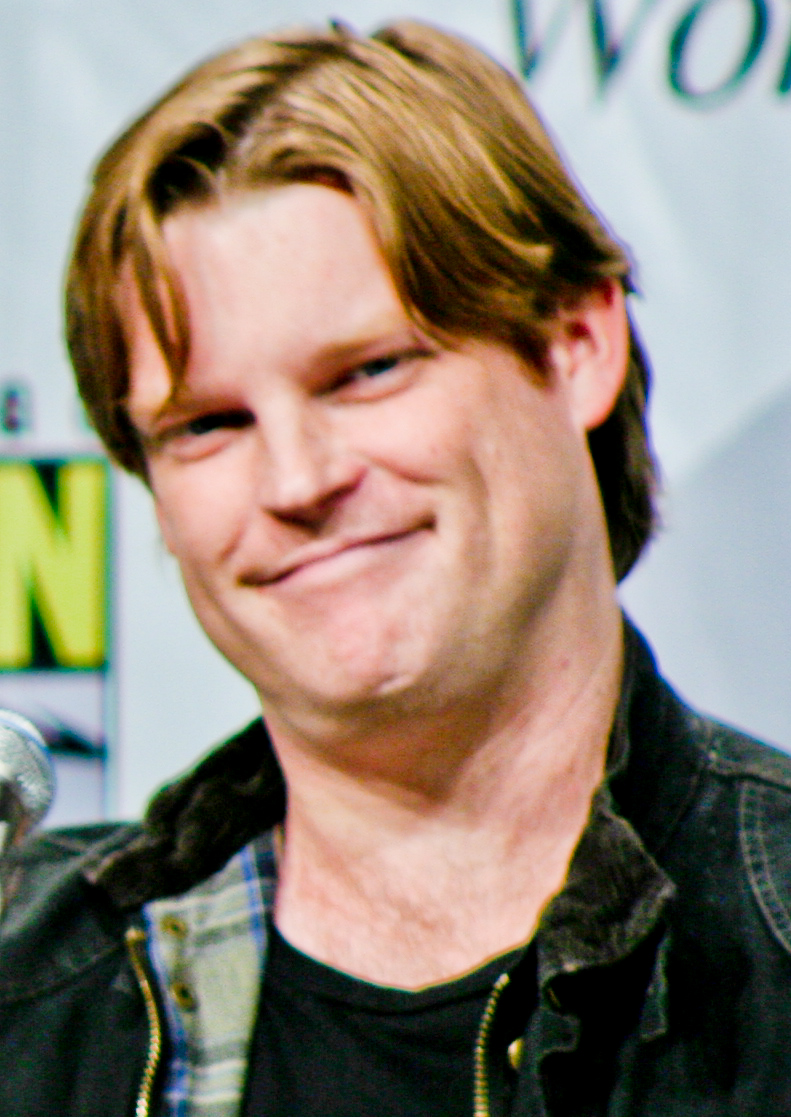
Beyer at the 2008 San Diego Comic-Con

Beyer starred in the pilot episode for the ABC series Roman's Empire. It did not move forward, but helped Beyer star in his next role on GCB as Zack Peacham.

His film roles include the films Mr. Woodcock, Sorority Boys, Trick, The General's Daughter, and Crazy in Alabama. Beyer played Major League Baseball player Kirby Higbe in the biographical film 42. His theatrical roles include The Chili Queen, Lighting Up the Two Year Old (for The Actors Studio), and Wonderland (at The American Place Theatre).

Beyer had a recurring role on NBC’s Third Watch. He has appeared on Sex and The City, Lie To Me, NCIS: Los Angeles, Criminal Minds, CSI: Miami, Law & Order, and Law & Order: SVU. Beyer played Don Meredith in the TNT original telefilm, Monday Night Mayhem. In 2012, Beyer was featured in a two-part episode of NCIS. His character was a war veteran with post-traumatic stress disorder who foils a domestic terror plot.

== Filmography ==
Year	Title	Role	Notes
1996	Law & Order	Jack Miniver	TV series (1 episode: "Girlfriends")
1996	Circus Lives		
1997	Cop Land	Young Cop	
1998	*69		Short
1998	Enough Already	John	
1999	Trick	Rich	
1999	The General's Daughter	Capt. Bransford	
1999	Crazy in Alabama	Jack	
1999	Game Day	Dave	
1999	Law & Order: Special Victims Unit	Dennis Caufield	TV series (1 episode: "Hysteria")
2000	Sex and the City	Arthur	TV series (1 episode: "Where There's Smoke...")
2001	Way Off Broadway	Darrin	
2001	Twelve	Zach Taylor (voice)	
2001–2002	Third Watch	Sgt. Jason Christopher	TV series (8 episodes)
2002	Monday Night Mayhem	Don Meredith	TV film
2002	The Perfect You	Chad	
2002	Sorority Boys	Spence Rivington	
2002	Hack	Daren Adams	TV series (1 episode: "Domestic Disturbance")
2004	CSI: Miami	Doug Sawyer	TV series (1 episode: "Witness to Murder")
2006	E-Ring	Damon	TV series (2 episodes)
2006–2008	Jericho	Stanley Richmond	TV series (26 episodes)
2007	Reign of the Gargoyles	Captain Porter	TV film
2007	Murder 101: If Wishes Were Horses	Jake Brawley	TV film
2007	Mr. Woodcock	Jay Elms - Dumb Jock	
2008	Criminal Minds	Detective Steve Berry	TV series (1 episode: "The Crossing")
2008	Without a Trace	Kevin Weaver	TV series (1 episode: "Cloudy with a Chance of Gettysburg")
2009	Lie to Me	Lieutenant Tom Clayton	TV series (1 episode: "Unchained")
2010	Backyard Wedding	Keith Tyler	TV film
2010	CSI: NY	Jay Carver / Parker	TV series (1 episode: "Justified")
2011	NCIS: Los Angeles	LAPD Detective Jeff Versey	TV series (1 episode: "Personal")
2012	The Mentalist	Ranger Sam Franklin	TV series (1 episode: "Cheap Burgundy")
2012	GCB	Zach Peacham	TV series (10 episodes)
2012	Common Law	Detective Brady Gooden	TV series (1 episode: "Pilot")
2012	NCIS	Marine Captain Joe Westcott	TV series (2 episodes)
2013	42	Kirby Higbe	
2013	The Glades	Ryan Baker	TV series (1 episode: "Yankee Dan")
2013	Royal Pains	Don O'Shea	TV series (5 episodes)
2013	Ironside	Chris Ellis	TV series (1 episode: "Sleeping Dogs")
2014	Perception	Mordecai 'Three Finger' Brown	TV series (1 episode: "Curveball")
2014	Extant	Harmon Kryger	TV series (8 episodes)
2016	Recovery Road	Paul Morell	TV series (4 episodes)
2017	Thank You for Your Service	James Doster	
2017	Vice Principals	Abusive Tiger Trainer	TV series (1 episode: "The Union of the Wizard & The Warrior")
2018	Hawaii Five-0	Navy Seal Tim Cole	TV series (1 episode: "Pio Ke Kukui, Pō’ele Ka Hale")
2019	Ford v Ferrari	Wayne (Customer)	Driver of MGA 1500
2021	For All Mankind	Carl Cartwright	TV series (2 episodes)
2026	It's Always Sunny In Philadelphia	Coach Bob	TV Series (1 episode: "Franks Team: A Dark Day for Baseball"
