= List of Sleeper Cell characters =

The following is a list of descriptions for characters on the Showtime television series Sleeper Cell. Michael Ealy is one of the star actors for the series.

== Main characters ==
=== Darwyn al-Sayeed ===
Darwyn al-Sayeed (played by Michael Ealy), known as Darwyn al-Hakim by the terrorist cells, is the protagonist of Sleeper Cell. As an African-American Muslim FBI agent, Darwyn was assigned to infiltrate an Islamist terrorist sleeper cell. His father, Benjamin al-Sayeed is a Nation of Islam member and his mother was formerly a Methodist, but she converted to Islam to marry Darwyn's father. However, their different ways of practicing Islam led to their breakup. It was also stated that Darwyn served in the United States Army Rangers prior to joining the FBI. In addition to English, he speaks fluent Spanish and Arabic.

=== Faris al-Farik ===
Saad bin Safwan (played by Oded Fehr) is the charismatic leader of the terrorist cell. Though his real name is Saad, he is more well known as Faris al-Farik (the "deadly knight"), one of his aliases. He is a former member of the Saudi Arabian National Guard. From 1987 to 1989, he fought the Soviet Army during the Soviet–Afghan War. He later returned to Riyadh after he was wounded, and later fought in the Gulf War, on Kuwait's side, along the American forces. After the war, he trained Mohamed Aidid's men in Somalia during the Somali Civil War. Following this, he fought alongside the Bosnian mujahideen in Bosnia (where he met and saved his right-hand man, Ilija Korjenić), and then fought alongside the Taliban in Afghanistan after he met Osama bin Laden, and later run Afghan training camp for Al-Qaeda. In America, he worked in a security company as a Jewish man named Yossi Amran.

=== Ilija Korjenić ===
Ilija Korjenić (played by Henri Lubatti) is a Bosnian-Muslim who became a terrorist after his entire family was killed in the Bosnian Genocide. In Bosnia, he was saved from the Serbs by the Bosnian mujahideen, one of them was Farik. He is the cell's resident math and science expert and Farik's right-hand man. He fought in the Bosnian War from 1992 to 1995. Germany granted him refugee status, and when they saw his talents in mathematics, they awarded him a scholarship. He first studied in Berlin, and then in Santa Cruz, California. He has a fondness for Rap music and karaoke. He states that he used to love America but since the Americans didn't help the Bosnians during the war, he began to hate them. He was a high school science and mathematics teacher.

=== Gayle Bishop ===
Gayle Bishop (played by Melissa Sagemiller) is a single mom who falls in love with Darwyn. She has a four-year-old son named Marcus. She is kidnapped and killed in the last episode by Mina, on orders from high up, as retribution for turning Darwyn in as a suspected terrorist in season one.

== First season characters ==
=== Christian Aumont ===
Christian Aumont (played by Alex Nesic) is a former skinhead from Paris who converted to Islam after falling in love with a Moroccan Muslim. However, instead of attaining peace and understanding, he just switched his hatred to focus on those he considers infidels. He served one year in the French Army as an appelé (conscript). In addition to French and English, he also speaks fluent Spanish. Despite being a devout Muslim, he frequently engages in one-night stands and even gets drunk when he learns that his wife wants a divorce. It was revealed that his wife, Zohra, was pregnant, and that since he was going to kill innocents she couldn't deal with being associated with him anymore, even for their child. He tried to kill Darwyn when finding out about his undercover work, angrily claiming he was a traitor, but in the end Darwyn snapped his neck.

=== Tommy Emerson ===
Thomas "Tommy" Allen Emerson (played by Blake Shields) is the blonde-haired, blue-eyed son of two liberal college professors from Berkeley, California. A Muslim convert, he may be inspired by John Walker Lindh. He has an intense dislike of authority figures which, according to him, was the reason for his conversion. He also served in the U.S. Army, though it was originally just to piss off his mother, and was discharged after he beat up his sergeant. After the failed attack on the stadium, he is cornered in the cell's van and commits suicide by blowing the van up as his mother listens on his cell phone.

=== Ray Fuller ===
Ray Fuller (played by James LeGros) is an FBI agent and Darwyn's supervisor. He is shown to be a very capable and intelligent agent and is also a close friend to Darwyn. However he is sometimes insensitive to Darwyn's beliefs which sometimes causes friction between the two. He is later murdered by a young man he tries to deport. After his death Darwyn shows immense guilt. He watches his funeral and visits Ray's widow despite the risk that it could blow his cover.

=== Patrice Serxner ===
Patrice Serxner (played by Sonya Walger) is the FBI agent who takes over Fuller's position after he is killed. Initially Darwyn acts antagonistically towards her due to her replacing Ray and her cold attitude. They later develop a friendship once she is shown to be just as capable as Ray and can look after Darwyn just as well. She has a brother in the military who she cares about. She states that if he were ever killed, she would quit the FBI, join a private military company and kill every combatant she sees. She is eventually captured and killed by terrorists.

== Second season characters ==
=== Salim ===
Salim (played by Omid Abtahi) is a young Iraqi-born Muslim who was brought up in the UK as a British Iraqi after his family left Iraq during the Iran–Iraq War. After being sent to an Islamic boarding school when his parents found out he was gay, he found his way to militant extremism. The combination of his closeted homosexuality and his Islamic fundamentalism have made him self-loathing and violent. He is the cell's resident engineer. Salim is killed in a failed bomb attack at the Hollywood Bowl by an FBI agent. Coincidentally, Abtahi would later go on to play another (unrelated) gay Muslim man also named Salim in the 2017 series American Gods.

=== Wilhelmina van der Hulst ===
Wilhelmina "Mina" van der Hulst (played by Thekla Reuten) is a Dutch woman and former prostitute who converted to Islam after falling in love with and marrying an Islamic Extremist man. When the two went to Iraq to join the insurgency, he was killed by American forces while she survived, although miscarrying their child in the process. In America, she serves as a nanny to a family, taking care of their two children. She is the cell's explosives and demolitions expert. She is based on Muriel Degauque. She is the one who kills Gayle and detonates a bomb in Las Vegas killing many U.S. veterans.

=== Benito Velasquez ===
Benito 'Benny' Velasquez (played by Kevin Alejandro) is a Latino gang member who converted to Islam and befriended Darwyn while in prison. His gang connections make him valuable to the cell. He worked at a grocery store. The FBI state that for him, Al-Qaeda is just another gang. He said to Darwyn that he felt that the Hispanics and African Americans are oppressed by Jewish and White Americans. He is based on José Padilla. Benny is killed when the compound is overrun with FBI. He had been trying to take down a helicopter with the rocket, when it malfunctioned. Before his death, we learn he has a mother and two sisters, that he warns to leave the city.

=== Warren Russell ===
Warren Russell (played by Jay R. Ferguson) is Darwyn's latest supervisor, who replaces Serxner after she is killed in Sudan. Young and inexperienced, he got the job only because his uncle is a powerful Deputy Director of the FBI, and his incompetence causes him to clash with Darwyn. His forceful nature leads him to pushing Gayle to spy on Mina and Darwyn and indirectly leads to her death. When Darwyn finds out Gayle has died, he punches Russell as his meddling has gotten someone close to Darwyn killed.

== Supporting characters ==
=== Bobby Habib ===
Abdullah "Bobby" Habib (played by Grant Heslov) was a member of the original Los Angeles sleeper cell and Gayle's next-door neighbor. He immigrated with his mother at Chicago, Illinois, at age fifteen, after his father, who was a colonel in the Egyptian Army was executed for participation in the murder of the president Anwar al-Sadat. He was in the U.S. Army as biological chemical warfare specialist during the Gulf War. Farik had the other terrorists stone him to death because he had talked about their plans to an uncle, putting them in danger as someone else could have overheard. Darwyn ultimately shot him in the head as a mercy killing to save him from being killed by the stoning. Because Habib had still been loyal, Farik made sure his family was looked after.

=== The Librarian ===
The Librarian (played by Albert Hall) is a "lifer" in prison where he preaches radical Islam to fellow inmates, preparing them to join terrorist groups upon their release. He was responsible for recruiting both Darwyn and Benny.

=== Eddy Pangetsu ===
Eddy Pangetsu (played by Jeff Mallare) is an Indonesian-American biochemical student at USC who moved to America when he was young. He reluctantly helps Farik's operations but refuses to get directly involved. Farik orders him to drive a shipment of anthrax from Canada to America. FBI agents capture the anthrax and claim that it had been on its way to Indonesia. Farik kills Eddy, believing that Eddy tried to steal the anthrax.

=== Zayd Abdal Malik ===
Zayd Abdal Malik (played by Marc Casabani) is a sheikh and a Koran scholar from Yemen. A moderate Muslim, Malik believes that Islamic extremists have hijacked his religion for their political agenda. He often debates captured terrorists in prisons on the Koran, hoping to convert them. Because of this, many extremists consider him an apostate. He travels to America to deliver a fatwa denouncing all terrorism done in the name of Islam but before he can, he is assassinated by Christian.

=== Jamal ===
Jamal (played by Jerrith J. Merz) is an imprisoned Islamic extremist who first appeared at the beginning of the episode "Scholar". He is visited by Zayd Abdal Malik, who challenges him to a debate between their two views on the Koran. Malik says that if Jamal can prove that the Koran supports the actions of the extremists, then Malik will join their cause. But if Malik can prove that the Koran forbids terrorism, then Jamal must renounce his extremist ways. After Malik's death, Jamal takes over his work of debating captured extremists, showing not only that Malik's methods can succeed but that there are people willing to fight for his cause.

=== Ken Walls ===
Ken Walls (played by John Siciliano) is a former mujahid who fought in Bosnia, earning him Ilija's respect. He trains mujahideen in an undercover facility in Los Angeles and sends them to join the Iraqi insurgency. Farik wants to use Ken's sophisticated facility as his base of operations. Ken refuses because, while he has no problem fighting the American military, he refuses to kill civilians. He is killed when he attempts to destroy his facility. The cell members give him a proper burial.

=== Khashul ===
Khashul (played by Luis Chavez) is a young man from Afghanistan. When the United States offered rewards for information on al-Qaeda and the Taliban, Khashul's family was accused by a personal enemy. Khashul was sent to Gitmo but was released and returned home to Afghanistan. His farm and family gone, Khashul is taken in by his sheik who teaches him to hate America. Khashul goes to Ken Walls' facility, now run by the cell, hoping to join the insurgency in Iraq. Darwyn looks after him, hoping to convert him to moderate Islam and help him escape. However, the FBI finds out about Khashul, who they see only as an escaped prisoner. Khashul is killed in his attempted escape.

=== Carli ===
Carli (played by Angela Gots) is Ilija's American girlfriend. She is strongly anti-American and believes that the government was behind the September 11th attacks. After the failed attack at the end of Season 1, Ilija escapes to Canada and brings Carli with him. When Ilija seeks to leave Canada, he reluctantly kills Carli to tie up loose ends. Ilija is greatly angered when the terrorists offer him a position in Canada after he kills her, as it would have made her death unnecessary.

=== Hassani ===
Hassani is an out-of-work Pakistani arms dealer turned halal butcher. He obtains a missile launcher for the cell through his son, who is in the United States Marine Corps. However, due to Warren Russell's meddling, the missile launcher he gives the cell is defective. Salim calls Hassani a thief and, in accordance with his strict interpretation of sharia law, cuts off his hand. Hassani bleeds to death.

=== Patrick Erskine ===
Patrick Erskine (played by Patrick St. Esprit) is the "bad cop" of Farik's interrogators. He is very violent and not afraid to mock Islam mercilessly. In turn, Farik gives sarcastic answers to his questions. Later, Erskine helps Darwyn and Samia get past airport security on their way to meet Farik.

=== Robert McNeil ===
Robert "Bob" McNeil (played by Chris Mulkey) is one of the CIA interrogators who questions Farik at Gitmo. While interrogating Farik, he tells him that as a child, he died in an accident and was revived a few minutes later. Because he saw no afterlife while he was dead, Bob rejected his family's strict Christianity and became an atheist. He is killed in Saudi Arabia during Farik's rescue.

=== Al-Hajjaj ===
Al-Hajjaj is the nickname of the Saudi Arabian interrogator who tortures Farik. He is named after Al-Hajjaj bin Yousef who, according to him, was very brutal but saved Islam from the extremists. He is killed during Farik's rescue.

=== Samia ===
Samia (played by Susan Pari) is Farik's wife. She was a Palestinian from Cisjordan. She lived there until the British give her a scholarship to study in Edinburgh, and she now lives in London with their daughter. Her brother was a member of Hamas who was killed in an attack led by the Israelis. Darwyn uses her to get close to Farik in Yemen. She is killed when Darwyn orders a missile strike on Farik's terrorist camp.

=== Khalid ===
Khalid Noor al-Dibb (played by Aasif Mandvi) was the leader of the second Los Angeles sleeper cell. Darwyn killed him when he discovered Darwyn was a law enforcement agent.

=== Farah ===
Farah (played by Sarah Shahi) is an Iraqi American medical student. Her parents want her to marry Salim, who she begins dating. While she initially appears to be interested in him, they later break up due to her more liberal view of Islam conflicting with Salim's more radical sectarian view, as well as Salim being a secretly gay man.

=== Jason ===
Jason (played by Michael Rady) is a gay man who Salim starts a relationship with after the two meet in a health club. Salim takes him to the stadium to die in the attack with everyone else but Darwyn saves him.

=== Asma ===
Asma (played by Jasmine Di Angelo) is Farik and Samia's daughter. A talented artist and horseback rider, she loves her parents very much. However, it is apparent that Farik plans to radicalize his daughter as he makes her choose between drawing and Islam. She gives up artistry as she loves her father.

=== Karrar ===
Abu Amin Mussa, better known by his alias Karrar Bashir al-Abbani (played by Saïd Taghmaoui) is a Muslim terrorist who Farik has replace Darwyn as the new leader of the second Los Angeles sleeper cell. His alias hinted he hails from Sudan (Serxner was also killed there) though it wasn't confirmed. When the cell's attack starts, Darwyn reveals that he's a member of the FBI and tells Karrar to surrender. Calling him a hypocrite, Karrar tries killing Darwyn. When Darwyn manages to subdue him, Karrar tries to get Darwyn to kill him by revealing how he was involved in Serxner's death, but Darwyn refuses to. He is taken into custody.
