= GCB (TV series) =

2012 American mid-season replacement TV series

- Also known as: Good Christian Bitches; Good Christian Belles
- Genre: Comedy drama
- Based on: Good Christian Bitches by Kim Gatlin
- Developed by: Robert Harling
- Starring: Leslie Bibb; Jennifer Aspen; Marisol Nichols; Miriam Shor; David James Elliott; Mark Deklin; Brad Beyer; Annie Potts; Kristin Chenoweth
- Composer: Jeff Beal
- Country of origin: United States
- Original language: English
- No. of seasons: 1
- No. of episodes: 10

Production
- Executive producers: Aaron Harberts; Aaron Kaplan; Alan Poul; Darren Star; Gretchen J. Berg; Robert Harling; Victor Nelli, Jr.; Sarah Caplan
- Producers: Veronica Becker; Andy Reaser; Jim Klever-Weis
- Camera setup: Multiple
- Running time: 43 minutes
- Production companies: Darren Star Productions; Kapital Entertainment; ABC Studios

Original release
- Network: ABC
- Release: March 4 – May 6, 2012

GCB (also known as Good Christian Bitches and Good Christian Belles) is an American comedy-drama television series developed by Robert Harling, produced by Darren Star, and starring Kristin Chenoweth, Leslie Bibb, Jennifer Aspen, Miriam Shor, Marisol Nichols, and Annie Potts. Airing on ABC, the series was based on the semi-autobiographical 2008 novel Good Christian Bitches by Kim Gatlin. The series centers on a recently widowed and financially ruined woman who moves her family back to the upscale Dallas-area town where she grew up.

The series debuted on March 4, 2012, as a mid-season replacement for Pan Am. The tenth and final episode aired on May 6, 2012, and the series was cancelled five days later.

A reboot of the failed, short-lived series was considered by The CW in November 2018, and again in October 2019 as a high-school focused series, but neither concept moved beyond the exploratory stage.

== Synopsis ==
The series follows Amanda Vaughn, former high-school "Queen Bitch" and recently widowed mother of two, who returns to her hometown of Highland Park, Texas, an enclave of Dallas. Formerly rich, Amanda lost everything when her husband was exposed as stealing billions of dollars from investors and died in a car crash with his mistress. She meets the former schoolmates she used to mock: Carlene Cockburn, the new "Queen Bitch"; Sharon Peacham, who was beautiful in high school and is now heavy and insecure and does the bulk of Carlene's bidding; glamorous business mogul Cricket Caruth-Reilly, whose husband, Blake, is gay; and Heather Cruz, a powerful Dallas real-estate agent. Amanda and her teenage children move in with her wealthy 60-something mother Gigi Stopper, who tries to influence Amanda's parenting and style choices, and gives her advice about strategic maneuvering among these women. While Amanda has grown considerably since high school and wants to move on with her life, Carlene and the others still resent Amanda. They don't believe she's changed and are out to drive her away.

== Cast and characters ==
=== Main characters ===
- Leslie Bibb as Amanda Vaughn (née Stopper), the protagonist of the series. A newly single mother and widow from Santa Barbara, California who moves back to her childhood hometown of Highland Park, Texas, with her two teenage children after her businessman husband, Bill (Greg Vaughan), dies in a car accident with his mistress who were attempting to flee the country after stealing billions of dollars from investors in a Ponzi scheme. In high school, Amanda was the head cheerleader and most popular girl in school.
- Kristin Chenoweth as Carlene Cockburn (née Lourd), the main antagonist of the series. She is a former "javelina" (literally a skunk pig) — a derisive nickname for girls outside the popular "Foxes" — who was a frequent target of Amanda's bullying and teasing throughout high school due to her short height and ugly appearance. After several plastic surgery procedures, she is now attractive and the new leader of the GCB's clique. While she claims to be a good Christian, she holds a personal grudge against Amanda and is judgmental of her, refusing to accept Amanda's apology for her past mistreatment and abuse, or to believe that Amanda is a better person now.
- Jennifer Aspen as Sharon Peacham (née Johnson), current member of the GCB's and a former beauty queen who is now focused on cooking meals for her husband, Zack, and children. She has gained weight and reluctantly allows herself to be pushed around by Carlene. Although a former Fox in high school, she competed in a beauty pageant against Amanda where she was sabotaged to lose by Amanda and has held a grudge against her ever since. Her husband, Zack, also has a huge crush on Amanda, which threatens Sharon.
- Marisol Nichols as Heather Cruz, a single woman, the most successful realtor in their town, and another friend of Carlene's and member of the GCB's. She used to be an outsider back in high school because she was poor (her mother worked in the school cafeteria as the cook), but Gigi took her under her wing and helped her become the successful real estate agent she is now.
- Miriam Shor as Cricket Caruth-Reilly, a strong-willed business woman and another one of Carlene's friends and member of the GCB's. She is just as crafty and wicked as Carlene, and sometimes competes against her for the spotlight. Similar to Carlene and Sharon, Cricket also holds a personal grudge against Amanda because, in high school, Amanda stole her boyfriend (who happened to be Bill) and spread a false rumor that turned her into an outcast "javelina."
- David James Elliott as Ripp Cockburn, Carlene's husband, the only one of the local men who seems hostile or indifferent to Amanda. He indicates that he and Amanda's late husband, Bill, have a past.
- Mark Deklin as Blake Reilly, Cricket's husband who is secretly gay, although Cricket knows and helps keep his secret. In the early episodes, he was in love with his ranch foreman, Booth Becker.
- Brad Beyer as Zack Peacham, Sharon's lecherous, luxury car dealership-owning husband who secretly loves Amanda. He kisses her against her wishes, unfortunately with Carlene spying it, believing Amanda encouraged it, and reporting it to Sharon. He was drafted by the Dallas Cowboys but injured his knee.
- Annie Potts as Elizabeth "Gigi" Stopper, Amanda's Christian mother and local socialite. She made "Gigi" her nickname because of her dislike of being called "Grandma." Despite Amanda's insistence about wanting to live a normal life, Gigi pushes her to be part of Dallas high society. In the pilot, Gigi owns two Doberman pinschers named Tony and Romo.

=== Recurring characters ===
- Tyler Jacob Moore (Donny Boaz in the pilot) as Pastor John Tudor, minister at Hillside Park United Memorial Church.
- Eric Winter as Luke Lourd, Carlene Cockburn's younger brother whose car is rear-ended by Amanda while he's not wearing pants. He becomes Amanda's love interest, which upsets Carlene greatly.
- Bruce Boxleitner as Burl Lourd, Carlene's uncle and Gigi's love interest.
- Lauran Irion as Laura Vaughn, Bill and Amanda's daughter. Amanda had feared Laura would be made fun of by the very clique/bully system she set up, but instead Laura was embraced as a "Fox." Amanda warned her daughter not to be part of this clique because it would corrupt her just like it did to Amanda when she was in high school, but Laura snapped back by saying that no matter what, she would never be like Amanda. Despite their differences, Laura openly expresses her love to her mother and tells her she is proud of her.
- Colton Shires as Will Vaughn, Bill and Amanda's son who Carlene said at first glance was the spitting image of Bill, Amanda's late husband.
- Alix Elizabeth Gitter as Alexandra Caruth-Reilly, Cricket's daughter and leader of the local "foxes".
- Mackinlee Waddell as McKinney Peacham, Sharon's daughter.
- Hartley Sawyer (Ryan Akir in the pilot) as Bozeman Peacham, Sharon's son.
- Jack DePew (Nick Krause in the pilot) as Landry Cockburn, Carlene's son.

=== Notable guests ===
- Tom Everett Scott as Andrew Remington a former high school nerdy classmate turned software billionaire from Seattle and Heather's lab partner in high school. They reconnect and start a relationship, but Andrew ends it when he realizes that he doesn't like living in Heather's high-profile social circle.
- Donna Mills as Bitsy Lourd, Burl's jealous wife and Gigi's nemesis; dies by choking on barbecue at Gigi's party.
- Kevin Alejandro as Danny, a local butcher who offers to supply meat for Amanda's cookout on the condition that Heather goes on a date with him. Heather winds up liking him, but is concerned about the vast differences in their income.
- Grant Bowler as Mason Massey, a "frozen foods magnate and thoroughbred horse breeder." Sparks fly when Massey meets with Cricket (Miriam Shor) to negotiate stud fee for his prize horse.
- Greg Vaughan as Bill Vaughn, Amanda's late husband, Laura and Will's father.
- Denton Blane Everett as Booth Becker, Blake's ex-ranch foreman and love interest.
- Sandra Bernhard as Debbie Horowitz, a wannabe Aztec terrorist
- Sheryl Crow as Herself

== Episodes ==
No.	Title	Directed by	Written by	Original release date	U.S. viewers (millions)
1	"Pilot"	Alan Poul	Robert Harling	March 4, 2012	7.56
After her marriage ends in scandal, single mother of two Amanda Vaughn (Leslie Bibb) returns to live with her socialite mother Gigi Stopper (Annie Potts) and start over in her upscale hometown in Texas. But Amanda soon realizes her past as the "Queen Bitch" is catching up to her. Ex-ugly duckling Carlene Cockburn (Kristin Chenoweth) is now living a picture-perfect life with a good-looking husband. Cricket Caruth-Reilly (Miriam Shor), whose boyfriend Amanda stole and later married, is now a powerful business woman with her husband. Problem is, her husband Blake (Mark Deklin) is gay. Ex-beauty queen Sharon Peacham (Jennifer Aspen) continues to resent Amanda after the "Queen Bitch" sabotaged her chances of winning the Miss Teen Dallas competition, while outsider Heather Cruz (Marisol Nichols) is now the Lone Star State's most successful realtor and the "Gossip Queen" of the social clique. Amanda is about to discover that payback can be a real pain.
2	"Hell Hath No Fury"	Victor Nelli, Jr.	Robert Harling	March 11, 2012	7.12
Gigi decides to throw a luncheon to reintroduce her daughter into society while Amanda becomes concerned that her teenage daughter Laura will be branded a "Javelina" - a name that Amanda coined herself in high school. A devastated Carlene, embarrassed by Amanda at church, plans to get even. Blake argues with Cricket over his priorities and Sharon worries about Zach's fidelity.
3	"Love Is Patient"	Larry Shaw and Victor Nelli, Jr.	Gretchen J. Berg & Aaron Harberts	March 18, 2012	6.07
While Amanda is forced to confront her past during a church relationship seminar, Heather sets her eyes on her new client - former high school nerd Andrew. Meanwhile, Carlene meddles in both Sharon’s and Cricket’s marriages to deflect from her own marital dissatisfaction.
4	"A Wolf In Sheep's Clothing"	Bethany Rooney	Henry Alonso Myers	March 25, 2012	6.33
When Amanda learns that her Uncle Burl and his wife Bitsy have returned to Dallas, Gigi decides to organize a homecoming party where guests are required to come dressed as their favorite Texan. Heather attempts to take Burl's 500 acres of land for Andrew. When Amanda comes up with a new jean design, Cricket seems to support it even as religious-right protestors cause her company to lose sponsors. However, Amanda discovers Cricket is secretly behind the protests; willing to hurt her own company for the sole reason to ruin Amanda as part of Cricket's own twisted way to get back at her for stealing Bill away from her many years ago, but Amanda keeps it to herself in respect to her own destructive and scandalous knowledge of Cricket and Blake's sham marriage. Meanwhile, Sharon and Zack go through a rough patch, resulting in Sharon going to work at the church and Zach taking over the household responsibilities for Sharon at home.
5	"Forbidden Fruit"	Randy Zisk	Laurie McCarthy	April 1, 2012	5.63
Heather brings Sheryl Crow to perform at the annual church fundraiser with a little help from her client and new love interest, Andrew, much to the chagrin of Carlene and Cricket who are both fighting for the stage. Gigi steals the show with Burl, while Carlene and Amanda find another reason to disagree with each other.
6	"Turn the Other Cheek"	James Hayman	Veronica Becker & Sarah Kucserka	April 8, 2012	5.25
Carlene and Ripp plan a "Gone With the Wind"-themed ceremony to renew their wedding vows, but things don't go as planned when Carlene takes matron-of-honor duties away from Sharon and gives them to Amanda in a bizarre attempt to keep Luke happy. Meanwhile, Heather seeks forgiveness from the ladies; and Blake surprises Cricket with a special request: he wants her to have another child.
7	"Sex is Divine"	John Scott	Jordon Nardino	April 8, 2012	5.22
In an unorthodox move, Pastor Tudor asks that his whole congregation have sex once a day for the whole week to test their commitment issues. Amanda is nervous about her first night with Luke. Carlene rejects Pastor Tudor's message and wants to teach the teens about purity, but disastrous results. Cricket and Blake try conceiving the old-fashioned way. Burl proposes to Gigi. And Sharon tries to spice her marriage and lose weight, giving Zach a new business idea.
8	"Pride Comes Before a Fall"	Matt Shakman	Robert Sudduth	April 15, 2012	4.43
To help Pastor Tudor get the upper hand over his rival, Amanda decides to produce a musical interpretation of the New Testament Heather wrote in high school. When Carlene and Cricket begin to fight over the lead role, Amanda takes a drastic move to put an end in the girl's fight. Meanwhile, Sharon seeks Gigi's help with promoting her business idea.
9	"Adam & Eve's Rib"	Victor Nelli, Jr.	Henry Alonso Myers	April 29, 2012	5.52
Ripp organizes the local church team for Dallas Interfaith BBQ Invitational, but he insists that only men take part. Not wanting Laura to be disappointed, Amanda forms an all-female team, the "Spicy Racks". Gigi convinces Burl to let them use his smoker grill, while Heather finds herself attracted to Carlene's butcher while trying to acquire quality meat. Sharon surprises everyone by offering a special sauce, and Cricket lets Amanda take some special wood for their smoke. Carlene opposes the group at every turn, but eventually she realizes that God and girl-power sometimes go hand-in-hand.
10	"Revelation"	Paul Holahan	Robert Harling	May 6, 2012	5.56
When Carlene takes the GCBs down to unincorporated Juarez for the groundbreaking ceremony for the Condos for Christian Living, the GCBs find themselves in danger, in the middle of the desert. Meanwhile Amanda's suspicions regarding Luke lead to a surprising discovery about Ripp, Cricket begins to wonder if a man she cares for can come between her and Blake, and Sharon's success goes to her head. Reeling from the events, Pastor Tudor kisses Amanda.

== Development and production ==
Kristin Chenoweth in the promotional poster.

Jennifer Aspen became the first actress cast in the pilot in February 2011. Aspen plays the role of Sharon Peacham. On March 1, 2011, it was announced that Leslie Bibb had landed the role of Amanda Vaughn in the pilot. Annie Potts also joined the show as Amanda's overbearing mother. Potts fielded 3 pilot offers before settling on GCB. Creator Robert Harling went to high school with Potts and based the character of Gigi on Potts' own mother.

On March 4, 2011, Deadline announced that Miriam Shor had joined the cast. On March 10, 2011, it was announced that Marisol Nichols had also joined the ensemble cast. On March 14, 2011, it was announced that Kristin Chenoweth had landed the lead role of Carlene Cockburn, the GCBs' queen bee. On March 16, 2011, David James Elliott was cast in the role of Ripp Cockburn, Carlene's husband.

On May 13, 2011, ABC picked up the pilot for the 2011–2012 television season. In July 2011, ABC put in a short order for just 10 episodes, to be available as a mid-season replacement for any troubled series on the network.

On December 1, 2011, it was announced that Sheryl Crow and Sandra Bernhard would be guest stars in the series.

The series debuted on March 4, 2012, as a mid-season replacement for Pan Am. The tenth episode aired on May 6, 2012, and the series was cancelled on May 11, 2012.

=== Naming ===
ABC was contacted by a number of Christians and Christian organizations who objected to the original title of the series, Good Christian Bitches, as they believed the name was demeaning toward Christianity, while some advocates for women found it problematic to use the word "bitches" to refer to women. Word of the name change came along with ABC's announcement that it had ordered the series. The series was renamed Good Christian Belles which appeared in several promos before the final renaming to the initialism GCB. Several ABC affiliates in Texas and other states in the Bible Belt had threatened to not air the show if the name wasn't changed.

The American Family Association filed a petition against the show, arguing that "With a title like Good Christian B-tches, you can imagine what kind of show it will be. Even if they change the title, the content will still mock people of faith." Its sister group One Million Moms also called for a boycott of GCB as "blasphemy at its worst!" New York City councilor Peter Vallone, Jr. called for a boycott of GCB claiming the series is "yet another outrageous attack on the Christian faith." Series star Chenoweth, a self-proclaimed evangelical Christian, said "I certainly wouldn't do anything that would make fun of my own faith. This is just chocolate cake, and it's actually a love letter to Dallas." Despite being retitled in the U.S., the series aired under its original title Good Christian Bitches in Denmark on Kanal 4, in Sweden on Kanal 5, in Norway on TV Norge and in the Netherlands on NET5. In Brazil and Latin America, it will air under its second working title Good Christian Belles on Canal Sony.

=== Reboot discussions ===
In November 2018, it was announced that a reboot of the short-lived series was in the works at The CW from original producer ABC Studios as well as CBS Television Studios. In October 2019, it was confirmed that the reboot of the original series had been dropped, though The CW briefly considered a new concept with the same title, targeting a younger audience by focusing on a high school girl.

== Music ==
Most of the music heard on the show is available for purchase at the iTunes Store and went on sale every week consecutively, on the same day episodes aired. Music releases include "This Little Light of Mine" performed by Miriam Shor and Kristin Chenoweth and "Prayer of St. Francis" also by Chenoweth, originally recorded for her Some Lessons Learned album. There are also many unreleased songs, like "Jesus Is Just Alright with Me" by Shor, Chenoweth, Mark Deklin and Cast, Deklin's "It's a Miracle", both from the episode Pride Comes Before a Fall, Sheryl Crow's "The Gospel According to Me" and Shor's rendition of "Amazing Grace", both from episode Forbidden Fruit.

GCB: Music from Season One

Soundtrack album by Various artists
- Released: May 8, 2012 (cancelled; never released)
- Recorded: 2004–12
- Genres: Country, christian
- Label: Warner Bros.

=== Background ===
An official album release featuring songs from the soundtrack titled GCB: Music from Season One was planned for a May 8, 2012, release, although after news of cancellation the release was apparently postponed or cancelled as well. Series star Kristin Chenoweth contributed two tracks to the album; Other contributing artists include country duo The JaneDear Girls and singer-actress Emily West. It consists mainly of original country, Christian songs, and only a few songs (Jason McCoy, Rick Trevino and Elizabeth Cook's) that have been previously released. The entire soundtrack is available as individual singles on iTunes and Amazon, except "Can't Behave" by Brett Eldredge; none of Jeff Beal's original score from the show is included.

=== Track listing ===
No.	Title	Artist(s)	Length
1.	"Good Girls Gone Bad"	The JaneDear Girls	2:40
2.	"Cross My Heart"	Emily West	2:14
3.	"Can't Behave"	Brett Eldredge
4.	"Jesus Take the Wheel"	Kristin Chenoweth	3:48
5.	"If You Don't Love Jesus Go to Hell"	Billy Joe Shaver	2:38
6.	"If I'm Gonna Be Bad"	Joanna Cotten	3:11
7.	"Sometimes It Takes Balls to Be a Woman"	Elizabeth Cook	3:17
8.	"Between Church and Elvis"	Jaime Hanna	3:27
9.	"Blessed Be the Ties That Bind"	Kristin Chenoweth	1:17
10.	"Dangerous"	Dean Alexander	3:54
11.	"Better in Texas"	Rick Trevino	3:55
12.	"I Feel a Sin Comin' On"	Jason McCoy	2:37

== Reception ==
The show received mixed reviews from critics. Metacritic gave it an aggregate score of 56 out of 100 or "mixed or average reviews" based on reviews from 21 critics.

The A.V. Club awarded the pilot episode with a disappointing grade of C−, remarking that the show failed to make an impression. Both critics, however, noted Chenoweth's performance as a highlight.

The show won the "TV You Betta Watch" category at Logo's 2012 NewNowNext Awards.

Eric Winter, who played Luke Lourd, said, "This is an extremely creative and smart show that just needs more of a chance to take off and run."
