= Oded Fehr =

Israeli actor (born 1970)

- עודד פהר
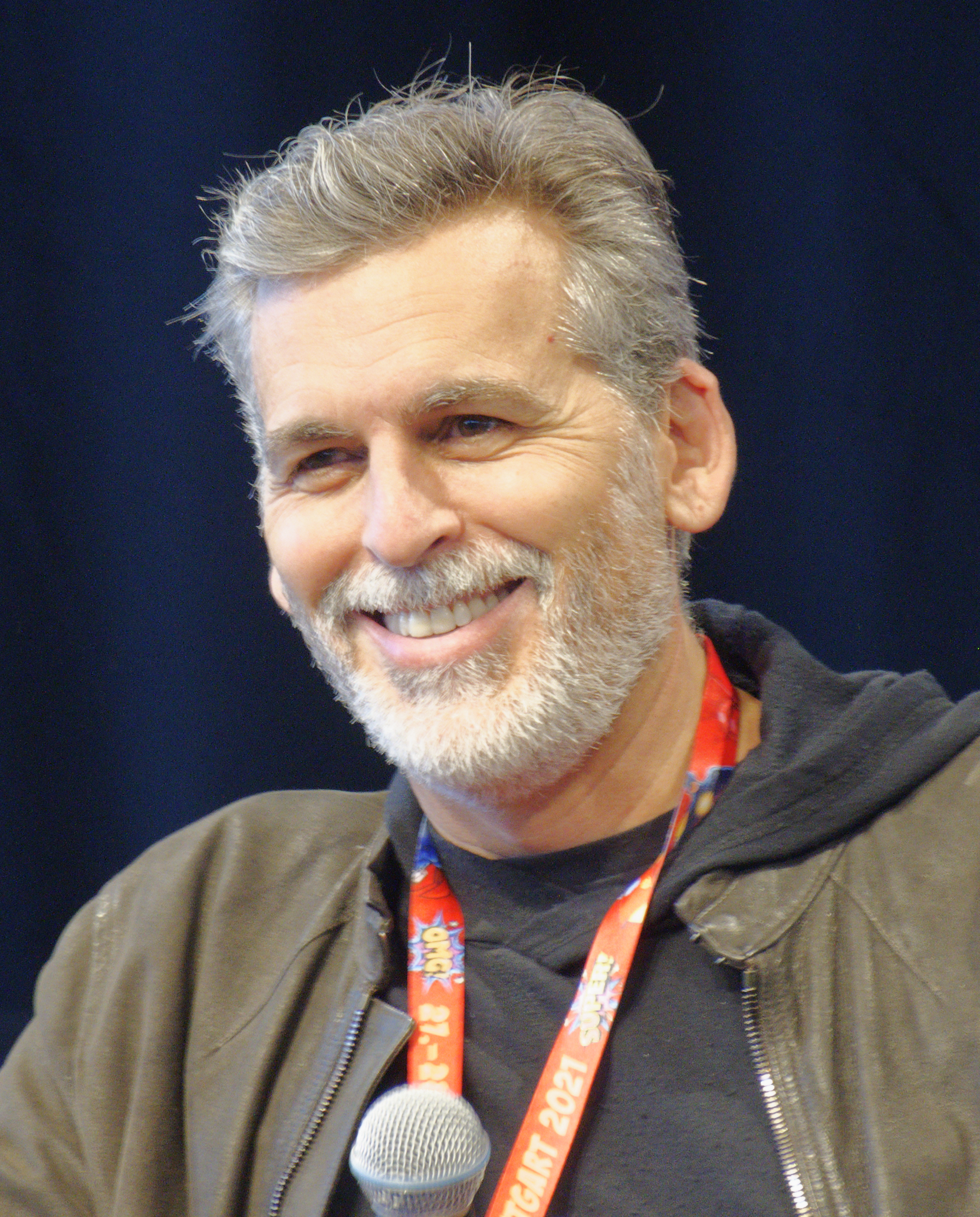
- Fehr at the Stuttgart 2022 -Comic Con Germany
- Born: 23 November 1970 (age 55); Tel Aviv, Israel
- Education: Bristol Old Vic Theatre School
- Occupation: Actor
- Years active: 1998–present
- Spouse: Rhonda Tollefson (m. 2000)
- Children: 3

Oded Fehr (Hebrew: עודד פהר; born 23 November 1970) is an Israeli actor based in the United States. He is best known for portraying Ardeth Bay in the 1999 film The Mummy and its sequel The Mummy Returns (2001), Carlos Olivera in the Resident Evil series, and Antoine Laconte in the Deuce Bigalow films.

On television, Fehr has starred as Faris al-Farik in Sleeper Cell, the demon Zankou in Charmed, Eyal Lavin in Covert Affairs, and Fleet Admiral Charles Vance in Star Trek: Discovery and Star Trek: Starfleet Academy.

== Early life ==
Fehr was born in Tel Aviv, Israel, the son of Gila (née Lachmann), a day care supervisor, and Uri Ernst Fehr, a Jerusalem-born geophysicist and marketing executive. His parents come from European Jewish families. He trained at the Bristol Old Vic Theatre School in England after briefly taking a drama class in Frankfurt, Germany. He served as a sailor in the Israeli Navy from 1989 to 1992 and used to work security for the Israeli airline El Al.

== Career ==
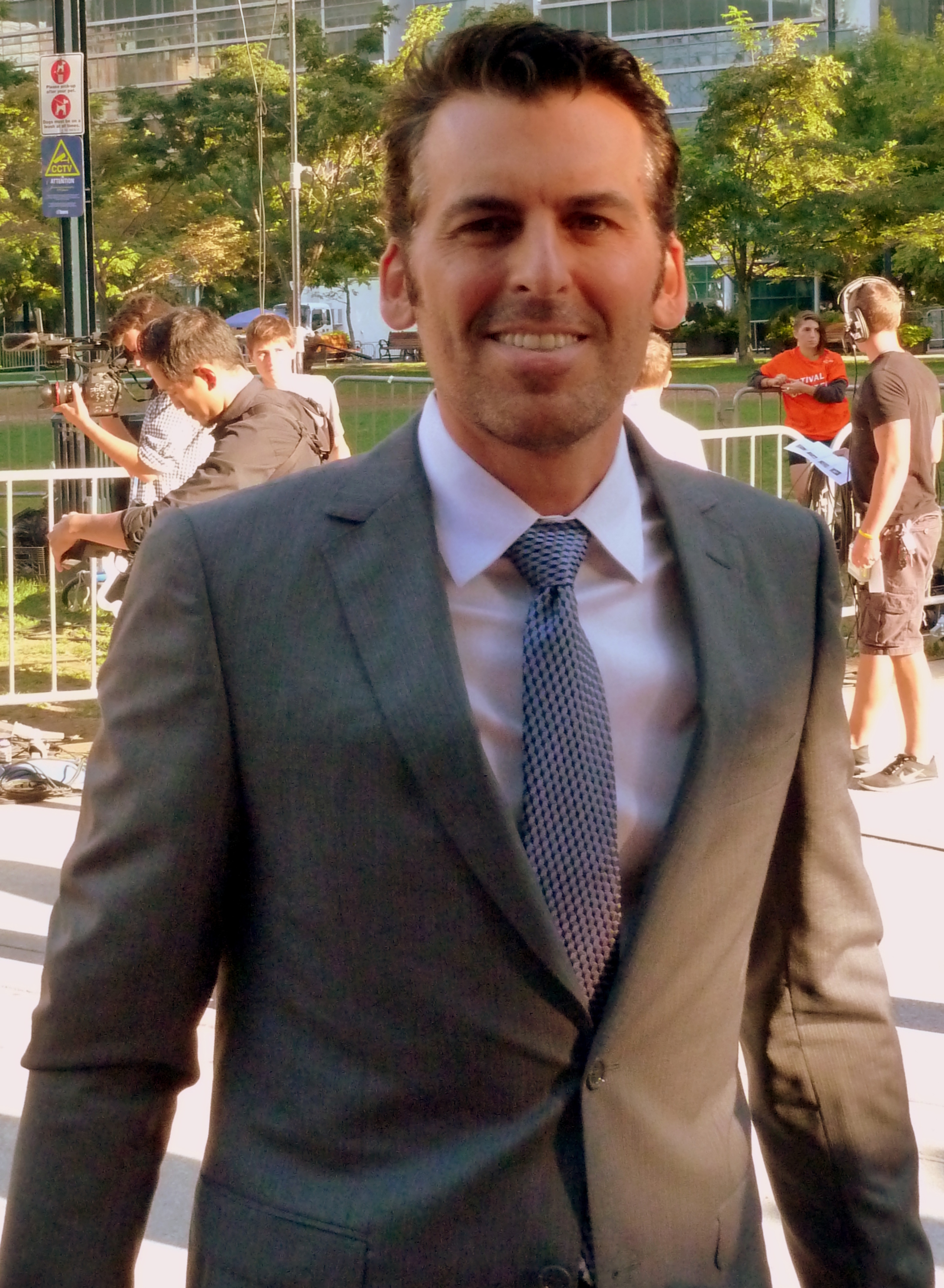
Fehr at the 2012 Toronto International Film Festival

Director Stephen Sommers cast Fehr in the films The Mummy and The Mummy Returns.

Fehr's screen appearances have included the 2001–02 NBC series UC: Undercover, the 2002–03 CBS series Presidio Med, and the 2004 film Resident Evil: Apocalypse (he reprised the role in the sequel, Resident Evil: Extinction). He provided the voice of Doctor Fate in Justice League and its sequel Justice League Unlimited, and played Antoine Laconte, a male prostitute, in Rob Schneider's comedies Deuce Bigalow: Male Gigolo (1999) and Deuce Bigalow: European Gigolo (2005). He also acted in the American hit supernatural series Charmed, where he played the demon Zankou, the chief villain in that series' seventh season.

Between 2005 and 2006, Fehr played Farik on the Showtime series Sleeper Cell.

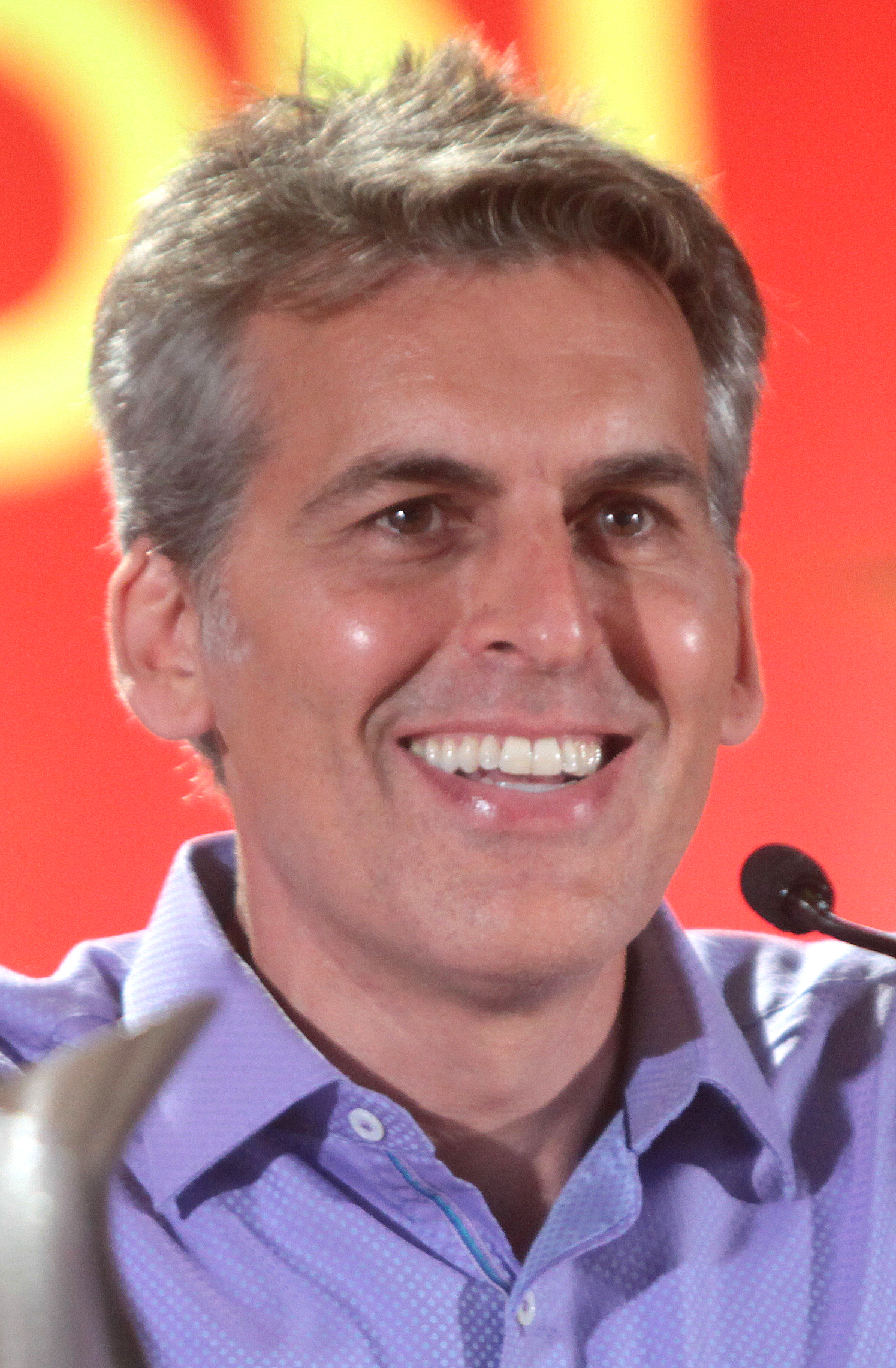
Fehr in 2016

From 2010 to 2014, he portrayed a recurring character, Mossad Agent Eyal Levin on the TV series Covert Affairs. In 2013, he guest starred in the episode "Shiva" of the 10th season of CBS NCIS as an Israeli Mossad assistant director.

Fehr returned to the fifth installment of the Resident Evil series, Resident Evil: Retribution. In 2019, Fehr appeared in the CBS drama Blood & Treasure, and began an ongoing role as Admiral Vance in Star Trek: Discovery. In 2026, Fehr was announced to return as Ardeth Bay in the fourth installment of The Mummy franchise.

== Personal life ==
Fehr married Rhonda Tollefson, whom he had met at the Los Angeles Opera, on 22 December 2000. The couple have three children.

== Filmography ==
=== Film ===
| Year | Title | Role | Notes |
|---|---|---|---|
| 1998 | Kiss of Fire | | |
| 1999 | The Mummy | Ardeth Bay | |
| 1999 | Deuce Bigalow: Male Gigolo | Antoine Laconte | |
| 2000 | Bread and Roses | Himself (Party Guest) | |
| 2000 | Texas Rangers | Anton Marsele | |
| 2001 | The Mummy Returns | Ardeth Bay | |
| 2004 | Resident Evil: Apocalypse | Carlos Olivera | |
| 2005 | Scooby-Doo! in Where's My Mummy? | Amahl Ali Akbar, Ancient One #1 (voice) | Direct-to-video |
| 2005 | Deuce Bigalow: European Gigolo | Antoine Laconte | |
| 2005 | Dreamer | Prince Sadir | |
| 2007 | Resident Evil: Extinction | Carlos Olivera | |
| 2008 | The Betrayed | Voice / Alek | |
| 2009 | Drool | Cheb Fleece | |
| 2009 | Limelight | Vincent Marlow | |
| 2011 | For the Love of Money | Levi | |
| 2011 | Super Hybrid | Ray | |
| 2012 | Resident Evil: Retribution | Todd / Clone Carlos | |
| 2012 | Inescapable | Sayid Abd Al-Aziz | |
| 2016 | Batman Unlimited: Mech vs. Mutants | Mr. Freeze (voice) | Direct-to-video |
| 2017 | Seam | Commander | |
| 2018 | White Chamber | Daran / Narek Zakarian | |
| 2020 | Lair | Ben Dollarhyde | |
| 2024 | La cocina | Rashid | |
| 2026 | Grizzly Night | Dr. John Lindberg | |
| 2027 | The Mummy: Book of the Dead | Ardeth Bay | Filming |

=== Documentaries ===
| Year | Title | Role |
|---|---|---|
| 2004 | Game Over: 'Resident Evil' Reanimated | Himself |
| 2004 | Game Babes | Himself |
| 2004 | Corporate Malfeasance | Himself |

=== Television ===
| Year | Title | Role | Notes |
|---|---|---|---|
| 1990 | Law & Order | Mr. Farber | Episode: "Everybody's Favorite Bagman" |
| 1998 | Killer Net | Victor / Barman | Miniseries, 2 episodes |
| 1999 | Cleopatra | Egyptian Captain | Miniseries, 2 episodes |
| 1999 | The Knock | Lukics | Episode: "Heaven and Hell" |
| 2000 | Arabian Nights | Robber #2 | Miniseries, 2 episodes |
| 2000 | UC: Undercover | Frank Donovan | 13 episodes |
| 2002–2003 | Presidio Med | Dr. Nicholas Kokoris | 4 episodes |
| 2003 | Justice League | Doctor Fate (voice) | Episode: "The Terror Beyond" |
| 2004–2006 | Justice League Unlimited | Doctor Fate (voice) | 3 episodes |
| 2004–2005 | Charmed | Zankou | 8 episodes |
| 2005 | American Dad! | Kazim (voice) | Episode: "Stan of Arabia: Part 2" |
| 2005–2006 | Sleeper Cell | Faris Al-Farik | 18 episodes |
| 2008 | Burn Notice | Timo | Episode: "Scatter Point" |
| 2008 | Eleventh Hour | Calvert Rigdon | Episode: "Containment" |
| 2009 | Medium | Dr. Thomas Statler | Episode: "Pain Killer" |
| 2009–2011 | Batman: The Brave and the Bold | Equinox (voice) | 4 episodes |
| 2010 | Three Rivers | Dr. Luc Bovell | Episode: "Case Histories" |
| 2010 | Law & Order: Los Angeles | Nick Manto | Episode: "Hollywood" |
| 2010–2014 | Covert Affairs | Eyal Lavine | 11 episodes |
| 2011 | V | Eli Cohn / Eli Cohen | 3 episodes |
| 2011–2021 | Young Justice | Ra's al Ghul (voice) | 7 episodes |
| 2012 | Jane by Design | Beau Bronn | Episode: "The Birkin & The Getaway" |
| 2012–2013 | Kaijudo | The Choten, Choten's Minions (voice) | 33 episodes |
| 2013 | NCIS | Mossad Assistant Director Ilan Bodnar | 3 episodes |
| 2013 | Ultimate Spider-Man | N'Kantu, the Living Mummy (voice) | 2 episodes |
| 2014–2015 | Hulk and the Agents of S.M.A.S.H. | N'Kantu, the Living Mummy (voice) | 2 episodes |
| 2015 | Stitchers | Leslie Turner | 7 episodes |
| 2015–2019 | The Blacklist | Mossad Agent Levi Shur | 4 episodes |
| 2016–2017 | Once Upon a Time | Jafar | 3 episodes |
| 2017 | 24: Legacy | Asim Naseri | 5 episodes |
| 2017 | How to Get Away With Murder | Attorney General Chase | Episode: "Nobody Roots for Goliath" |
| 2018 | When Heroes Fly | Moshiko Boaron | 5 episodes |
| 2018 | The First | Eitan Hafri | 8 Episodes |
| 2019 | Blood & Treasure | Karim Farouk / Rasheed Hegazi | 8 episodes |
| 2019 | Younger | Rafa | 1 episode |
| 2021 | FBI: Most Wanted | Colin Kent | 1 episode (crossover event) |
| 2021 | FBI | Colin Kent | 1 episode (crossover event) |
| 2021 | FBI: International | Colin Kent | 1 episode (crossover event) |
| 2020–2024 | Star Trek: Discovery | Admiral Charles Vance | Recurring role, 21 episodes |
| 2025 | House of David | Abner | Main cast |
| 2026 | Star Trek: Starfleet Academy | Commander-In-Chief Charles Vance | Recurring role, 5 episodes |
| 2026 | Your Friends & Neighbors | DeMille | Recurring role, 3 episodes |

=== Video games ===
| Year | Title | Role | Notes | Source |
|---|---|---|---|---|
| 2004 | Champions of Norrath: Realms of EverQuest | | | |
| 2017–present | Destiny 2 | Osiris | Curse of Osiris, Season of Dawn, Beyond Light, Season of the Hunt, Season of the Chosen, Season of the Splicer, Season of the Lost, Season of the Seraph, Lightfall, Season of the Wish, The Final Shape, and Episode: Echoes. | |
