= Soul Survivors (film) =

2001 film by Stephen Carpenter

- Promotional poster
- Directed by: Stephen Carpenter
- Written by: Stephen Carpenter
- Produced by: Stokely Chaffin; Neal H. Moritz
- Starring: Casey Affleck; Wes Bentley; Eliza Dushku; Angela Featherstone; Melissa Sagemiller; Luke Wilson
- Cinematography: Fred Murphy
- Edited by: Janice Hampton; Todd C. Ramsay
- Music by: Daniel Licht
- Production company: Gold Circle Films
- Distributed by: Artisan Entertainment
- Release date: September 7, 2001
- Running time: 84 minutes
- Country: United States
- Language: English
- Budget: $17 million
- Box office: $4.2 million

Soul Survivors is a 2001 psychological thriller film directed by Stephen Carpenter and starring Melissa Sagemiller as college student Cassie, whose boyfriend Sean (Casey Affleck) dies in a car accident that results from her driving after a night of partying. The accident leaves Cassie wracked with guilt and emotionally vulnerable to the point that she begins hallucinating strange visions and waking-dreams, even as Cassie's friends Annabel (Eliza Dushku) and Matt (Wes Bentley), as well as a local priest, Father Jude (Luke Wilson), attempt to assist her in coping with the loss.

== Plot ==
Cassie and Sean, along with ex-boyfriend Matt and good friend Annabel, go to a nightclub situated in an old church with religious beliefs for Cassie. There, Cassie sees Deathmask, a man wearing a clear, plastic mask, and Hideous Dancer, an imposing man with a scarred face. Deathmask tries to grab her on the dance floor, but she pushes him away and steps outside the club with Sean.

In the parking lot, Matt eavesdrops on their conversation. Sean confesses his love for Cassie, who claims she feels the same way. When Sean returns to the club, Matt convinces Cassie to give him a last 'goodbye' kiss. Sean sees this and reacts badly, giving Cassie the silent treatment as they drive off. Cassie, who is behind the wheel, continually looks away from the road until the car crashes. Cassie's next memory is of being rushed to the hospital; Matt and Annabel are unharmed, but Sean has been killed on impact.

During the following school term, Cassie has several visions (in bed) of Sean. She also has visions of Deathmask and Hideous Dancer in the company of Matt and Annabel. She believes the two men are chasing her on several occasions, although Annabel and Matt assure her that the incidents are all in her mind. After one chase, Cassie faints and is rescued by Father Jude, a young priest who is sympathetic to her fears and offers to listen if she ever needs someone to talk to.

A few nights later, after being chased again, Cassie knocks at the church door, and Father Jude gives her sanctuary. He gives her an amulet depicting Saint Jude and allows her to sleep in his small room in the church. Upon awakening that morning, Cassie sees that the calendar in the room reads 1981. She enters the office of attending priest Father McManus and asks to speak to Father Jude but is told that Father Jude died in 1981.

After being made to participate in a swimming competition, Cassie is chased by Deathmask. Defending herself with the tube of a fluorescent lamp, she ends up stabbing him in the stomach, but when Cassie returns with Matt, they find no body in the pool. Even though she believes that Matt and Annabel are conspiring against her with Deathmask and Hideous Dancer, Cassie requests that Matt take her home to her mother. Instead, he drives Cassie to the club, saying he wishes to pick up Annabel. Cassie follows him but gets lost, eventually finding Annabel with a new lover, Raven. When Raven tells Cassie to "leave or die" Cassie exits the club and returns to the parking lot. There, Matt drunkenly insists on another "goodbye forever" kiss, but Cassie smashes a bottle on his head, knocking him unconscious, then pushes him from the car and drives away. She arrives at the site of the accident, witnessing Annabel dying from it.

After Cassie is run over by a car, Father Jude approaches her, offering assistance; after taking it, she awakens in the hospital. On a gurney next to her is Raven, who speaks a few words of comfort before dying. Father Jude arrives and explains everything she has experienced has been a sort of coma dream – in the original accident, Cassie and Sean survived while Matt and Annabel were killed. The occupants of the other car – Raven, Deathmask, and Hideous Dancer – were also fatally injured. Cassie has been in a half-dead state wherein those killed in the accident have attempted to keep her with them; Father Jude – an angel from heaven – and her visions of Sean have kept Cassie alive. He asks if she would be willing to die to save Sean's life; she agrees, and he then asks her if she would be willing to live for him. Cassie admits she does not want to die. She awakens in a hospital room with her parents and Sean by her side; they embrace. She is later seen getting married.

There is an alternate ending in which Cassie is taken out of the hospital in a wheelchair by to nurses which are revealed to be Deathmask and Hideous Dancer and start to strangle her, she wakes up in bed with Sean beside her. She gasps and grabs her neck and chest. Sean asks, "That dream again?" and she nods.

== Cast ==
- Melissa Sagemiller as Cassie
- Casey Affleck as Sean
- Eliza Dushku as Annabel
- Wes Bentley as Matt
- Angela Featherstone as Raven
- Luke Wilson as Father Jude
- Allen Hamilton as Dr. Haverston
- Carl Paoli as Deathmask
- Ken Moreno as Hideous Dancer
- Barbara E. Robertson as Margaret
- Richard Pickren as Ben
- Rick Snyder as Father MacManus
- Candace Kroslak as Cool Blonde
- Ryan Kitley as Young Cop
- Danny Goldberg as Campus Cop
- T. J. Jagodowski as ER Doctor
- Christine Dunford as ER Nurse
- Lusia Strus as Stern Nurse
- Scott Benjaminson as Second Campus Cop

== Production ==
Artisan nabbed Stephen Carpenter’s spec script, at the time known as Soul Survivor for a mid-six-figure after a small bidding war with Paramount and Fox. Filming took place in Chicago and surrounding suburbs. Some scenes were also filmed in Gary, Indiana. The filming started in May 1999 and concluded in September 1999.

== Reception ==
On the review aggregator website Rotten Tomatoes, 4% of 47 critics' reviews are positive, with an average rating of 2.9/10. The website's consensus reads: "Soul Survivors' stock characters and utter lack of suspense gives viewers little reason to attempt deciphering the confusing plot." On Metacritic, the film has a score of 20 out of 100 based on reviews from 11 critics, indicating "generally unfavorable reviews".

The New York Times panned the film, saying, "Yes, there is an explanation for everything, but it is a long time coming and not worth the wait." Empire gave the film two stars and said "We’ve been here before, and we’ll be here again." JoBlo.com rated the film 4 out of 10 and said " It just didn’t feel like a whole movie to me. It’s more of a collage of tensionless, repetitive scenes (a chase, an apparition, a chase, an apparition...and so on) patched together with crazy lighting flashing about and loud music booming in the background."

The film opened wide on 601 screens in the United States and Canada and grossed $1,140,698 for the weekend, the lowest for a wide release during 2001. It grossed $3.1 million in the United States and Canada and $4.3 million worldwide.
