= Sometimes They Come Back... Again =

1996 film by Adam Grossman

- VHS Cover
- Directed by: Adam Grossman
- Screenplay by: Guy Riedel; Adam Grossman
- Story by: Guy Riedel
- Based on: Characters by Stephen King
- Produced by: Michael Meltzer
- Starring: Michael Gross; Alexis Arquette; Hilary Swank; Jennifer Elise Cox; W. Morgan Sheppard; Jennifer Aspen
- Cinematography: Christopher Baffa
- Edited by: Stephen Myers
- Music by: Peter Manning Robinson
- Production company: Michael Meltzer Productions
- Distributed by: Trimark Pictures
- Release date: September 3, 1996
- Running time: 98 minutes
- Country: United States
- Language: English

Sometimes They Come Back... Again is a 1996 film directed by Adam Grossman and starring Michael Gross, Alexis Arquette, and Hilary Swank. It is the straight-to-video sequel to the 1991 horror film Sometimes They Come Back.

== Plot ==
Psychologist Jon Porter learns that his mother has just mysteriously fallen to her death. Jon and his teenage daughter Michelle return to Jon's hometown of Glenrock for his mother's funeral. Once there, painful memories return. Thirty years earlier, when Jon was a child, he witnessed the brutal murder of his older sister Lisa, who was stabbed to death in a cave by Lisa's boyfriend Tony Reno, and his two friends Vinnie and Sean, who were attempting a demonic ritual which Jon stopped by accidentally knocking an electrical wire into a puddle of bloody water they were standing in, killing all three of them.

Michelle becomes friends with mentally handicapped gardener Steve, as well as two girls, boy-crazy Maria, and Maria's psychic best friend, Jules, who used to clean her grandmother's house. The night after the funeral, they invite Michelle to go to the diner with them, saying they would like to get to know her before she goes home for her 18th birthday. At the diner, the girls are greeted by a boy who looks a lot like Tony Reno, even with the same name. While Maria develops a crush on him, he seems to be attracted to Michelle. He gives Michelle an old pocket watch as an early birthday present, then leaves.

Meanwhile, Jon is pestered by Father Archer Roberts, a priest he came to when Lisa was murdered. He tells Jon his mother's death was not an accident.

It is revealed that Tony is the same thug that killed his sister and also killed his mother in order to bring himself back from the dead. Tony kills Steve with his lawnmower and uses his body parts to perform a ritual in order to bring Vinnie back. At the diner, Vinnie pretends to scare Tony away, making Maria fall in love with him. While they're making out in the forest, Vinnie turns into a Demon and kills Maria in order to use her body parts to bring Sean back. Jules, whose psychic abilities upset Tony, while searching for Maria is taken to a dam by Tony, Vinnie and Sean, who were disguised as the Sheriff and her deputies. Tony kills Jules by slashing her with her own tarot cards. Father Roberts is later killed by Tony while trying to do a ritual to banish Tony and his friends back to Hell, and Michelle is kidnapped in order to be used in Tony's ritual.

In the end, Jon reenacts the events of the murder of Lisa, but saves Michelle and is able to use Father Roberts' ritual to banish Tony and his friends back to Hell. Sometime later, Jon is having a session with one of his patients and suddenly has a hallucination of Tony but quickly returns to normal.

After the credits, Tony re-appears in Jon's office to announce that he's back.

== Cast ==
- Michael Gross as Jon Porter
  - Michael Malota as young Jon Porter
- Alexis Arquette as Tony Reno
- Hilary Swank as Michelle Porter
- Bojesse Christopher as Vinnie Ritacco
- Glen Beaudin as Sean Patrick
- Jennifer Elise Cox as Jules Martin
- Jennifer Aspen as Maria Moore
- W. Morgan Sheppard as Father Archer Roberts
- Gabriel Dell Jr. as Steve Pagel
- Patrick Renna as Alan
- Leslie Danon as Lisa Porter
- Molly Hagen as Officer Violet Searcey

== Sequel ==
The video was followed by another straight-to-video sequel in 1998 titled, Sometimes They Come Back... for More.
