= Carl Paoli =

American actor

- Born: Carl L. Paoli
- Occupation: actor / stuntman / director

Carl Paoli is an actor and stuntman. He has worked in front of and behind the camera for over 20 years in many capacities. Born and raised in Chicago, he started shooting on 8mm at age 15 and moved to 16mm after high school. He switched to DV as soon as it became available and then did the same with HD. Paoli has directed the shorts Wicker Park (1999), Cotton Mouth (2000), Nenu (2002), the Officially Selected Dances with Films Festival short film, Rain Today (2003) and most recently, Falling (2005).

== Filmography ==
- Captivity (2007) - Victim #1
- Freedom Writers (2007) - Cop #3
- Soul Survivors (2001) - Deathmask
- Firehouse (1997) - Screaming Man
- Mario and the Mob (1992)

== Director ==
- Falling (2005)
- Rain Today (2004)
- Nenu (2002)
- Cotton Mouth (2000)
- Wicker Park (1999)

== Stunts ==
- The Beast (2008)
- Eagle Eye (2008)
- The Horsemen (2008)
- The Dark Knight (2008)
- Witless Protection (2008)
- The Eye (2008)
- Enchanted (2007)
- Live Free or Die Hard (2007)
- The Hitcher (2007)
- Stranger Than Fiction (2006)
- The Lake House (2006)
- Batman Begins (2005)
- The Amityville Horror (2005)
- Ocean's Twelve (2004)
- Ladder 49 (2004)
- Something's Gotta Give (2003)
- Anger Management (2003)
- Minority Report (2002)
- Hardball (2001)
- Soul Survivors (2001)
- Jurassic Park III (2001)
- Sugar & Spice (2001)
- Finding Forrester (2000)
- The Watcher (2000)
- Frequency (2000)
- Stir of Echoes (1999)
- Mercury Rising (1998)
- Bean (1997)
- Face/Off (1997)
- My Best Friend's Wedding (1997)
- The Relic (1997)
- Normal Life (1996)
- The Funeral (1996)
- Chain Reaction (1996)
- Primal Fear (1996)
- While You Were Sleeping (1995)
- Tank Girl (1995)
- Natural Born Killers (1994)
- The Bee (1994)
- Judgment Night (1993)
- The Kill Reflex (1989)
- Child's Play (1988)

== TV ==
- Made an appearance as a cop on Standoff in 2006.
- Did an unknown amount of stunt work for CSI: NY in 2005.
- Did stunt work for Prison Break in 2005.
- Did an unknown amount of stunt work for House M.D. in 2004.
- Made an appearance on CSI: Crime Scene Investigation as Jimmy Mauer in 2002.
- Did stunt work for Six Feet Under in 2001.
- Did stunt work in two episodes of Oz in 1996.
- Did stunt work for The Untouchables in 1993.
