= High Fidelity (TV series) =

2020 American romantic comedy TV series

- Genre: Romantic comedy
- Based on: High Fidelity by Nick Hornby
- Developed by: Veronica West; Sarah Kucserka
- Starring: Zoë Kravitz; Jake Lacy; Da'Vine Joy Randolph; David H. Holmes
- Narrated by: Zoë Kravitz
- Music by: Nathan Larson
- Country of origin: United States
- Original language: English
- No. of seasons: 1
- No. of episodes: 10

Production
- Executive producers: Jesse Peretz (pilot); Jeffrey Reiner; Zoë Kravitz; Nick Hornby; Veronica West; Sarah Kucserka; Josh Appelbaum; André Nemec; Jeff Pinkner; Scott Rosenberg
- Producers: Adrienne Erickson; Raymond Quinlan
- Cinematography: Carmen Cabana
- Editors: Kate Hickey; Catherine Haight; Matthew James Barbato; Jack Cunningham
- Running time: 26–34 minutes
- Production companies: West & Kucserka; Midnight Radio; ABC Signature

Original release
- Network: Hulu
- Release: February 14, 2020

High Fidelity is an American romantic comedy television series developed by Veronica West and Sarah Kucserka for Hulu. Based on the 1995 novel of the same name by Nick Hornby and its 2000 film adaptation, it stars Zoë Kravitz (whose mother Lisa Bonet appears in the original film) as Robyn "Rob" Brooks, a young record store owner who revisits her past relationships through music and popular culture.

High Fidelity premiered on Hulu on February 14, 2020, to positive reviews from critics. The series was canceled in August 2020 after one season.

== Premise ==
High Fidelity follows "the ultimate music fan, a record store owner who's obsessed with pop culture and Top Five lists" in the neighborhood of Crown Heights, Brooklyn.

== Cast and characters ==
=== Main ===
- Zoë Kravitz as Robyn "Rob" Brooks, the owner of Championship Vinyl who struggles with a lifetime of failed relationships
- Jake Lacy as Clyde
- Da'Vine Joy Randolph as Cherise, an employee at Championship Vinyl and one of Rob's best friends
- David H. Holmes as Simon, an employee at Championship Vinyl and Rob's other best friend who is also Rob's heartbreak story #3

=== Recurring ===
- Kingsley Ben-Adir as Russell "Mac" McCormack, Rob's latest ex-boyfriend who broke her heart and heartbreak story #5
- Rainbow Sun Francks as Cameron Brooks, Rob's brother
- Nadine Malouf as Nikki Brooks, Cameron's pregnant wife and Rob's sister-in-law
- Antonio Ortiz as Carlos, a bodega cashier
- Edmund Donovan as Blake, a barista who flirts with Simon

=== Guest ===
- Clark Furlong as Kevin Bannister, Rob's heartbreak story #1 when she was in middle school
- Ivanna Sakhno as Kat Monroe, Rob's heartbreak story #2
- Justin Silver as Justin Kitt, Rob's heartbreak story #4
- Kevin Iso as Lewis, a friend of Rob, Simon, and Cherise
- Thomas Doherty as Liam Shawcross, a young Scottish musician
- Debbie Harry as herself
- Jeffrey Nordling as Tim Parker, a music enthusiast whose wife is secretly selling his vinyl collection
- Parker Posey as Noreen Parker, an Upper West artist who wants to sell her husband Tim's vinyl collection
- Jack Antonoff as himself
- Sydney Mae Diaz and Kyoko Takenaka as Shane and Peachy, two aspiring musicians who borrow the store's records
- Brian Silliman as the Hammer, an old friend of Rob and Cameron
- Christian Coulson as Benjamin Young, a lawyer and Simon's on-again, off-again boyfriend
- Dana Drori as Lily, Mac's fiancée
- Tara Summers as Tanya, Rob's first roommate, with whom she goes out on her 30th birthday

== Episodes ==
No.	Title	Directed by	Written by	Original release date
1	"Top Five Heartbreaks"	Jesse Peretz and Jeffrey Reiner	Veronica West & Sarah Kucserka	February 14, 2020
Robyn "Rob" Brooks is the owner of a record store called Championship Vinyl in Brooklyn. Breaking the fourth wall, she explains her history of failed relationships, five of which she calls her All-Time Top 5 Most Memorable Heartbreaks. One of her ex-boyfriends is Simon, a music enthusiast who is still a close friend of hers and now works at her store. They work at the store with Cherise, an aspiring musician and another close friend of Rob's. Together, the trio often makes Top 5 lists of their favorite things. To the audience, Rob reveals that her number one heartbreak was Russell "Mac" McCormack, who dumped her and moved to London. A year after her breakup with Mac, Rob goes on a first date with a man named Clyde to avoid getting set up by her brother. On her way to her date, she surprisingly bumps into Mac, who has moved back to New York. At her date, she is at first disinterested, but ultimately warms to Clyde. They spend the night at her house. The next day, she is dismayed to wake up and find Clyde gone. When he returns to her house later that night with an explanation, she acts coldly. To the audience, she admits she still has feelings for Mac.
2	"Track 2"	Jeffrey Reiner	Veronica West & Sarah Kucserka	February 14, 2020
Rob begins crafting a playlist for Mac with no intention of sending it to him. To the audience, she explains the elements of a good playlist. She reminisces about her relationship with Mac. It is revealed that shortly before they broke up, she had found an engagement ring intended for her in his things. Panicking, she left their apartment without explanation, returning hours later to let him know she was ready to be engaged. In the present day, Simon and Cherise, interrupts Rob's reminiscing to take her to a bar to see an up-and-coming punk rock singer named Liam Shawcross. Impressed by Liam's performance, Simon and Cherise tell him about Championship, asking him to stop by. "Nothing Compares 2 U" plays at the bar and Rob realizes it's the perfect song to end her playlist. She sends it to Mac, who doesn't respond. The next morning, having brunch with her brother Cam and his wife Nikki, Rob discovers that Mac is now dating a woman named Lily. She leaves infuriated.
3	"What Fucking Lily Girl?"	Jeffrey Reiner	Josh Koenigsberg	February 14, 2020
Rob is upset to learn that Mac and Lily have been dating for a year and that he's about to propose to her. She starts to obsess over Lily, stalking her Instagram and going to a frosé bar after learning that it's Lily's favorite drink. Later, Rob, Simon, and Cherise hang out with Liam the punk rock singer at a bar. Rob and Liam end up at Liam's apartment, where Rob discovers that Liam's much younger than her. She leaves abruptly. Questioning why her relationships never work, Rob decides to call Kevin Bannister, who dumped her in middle school and is one of her All-Time Top 5 Most Memorable Heartbreaks. She learns through his mom that he married the girl he dated after Rob in middle school. This revelation makes Rob believe that the breakup with Kevin Bannister was not her fault and was instead in the hands of fate. Relieved, she decides to reach out to the other four people in her Top 5 heartbreaks and understand the reason of each breakup.
4	"Good Luck and Goodbye"	Andrew DeYoung	Eli Wilson Pelton	February 14, 2020
Rob starts her search to track down her Top 5 Heartbreaks to find out why she's always "rejected." Though initially planning on speaking with them chronologically, she runs into Simon at a pretentious coffee shop. Simon becomes annoyed when Rob tells him he's on her list of heartbreaks, but also insists that since they've maintained their friendship, in a way, they've never broken up. At the store, Rob and Simon notice Cherise putting in more work than usual and that she's put up a flyer in search of a band. Rob reaches out to Kat Monroe through Instagram, where Kat's found a moderate amount of fame as an influencer but is left on read. Rob decides to move on to Justin Kitt, her fourth ex, who still performs stand up comedy as he did when they were dating. Rob becomes moderately disinterested in their conversation, but she does feel a lot better when reminded that she was the one who ended things with Justin not the other way around. The next day, Kat follows up with Rob. They meet at a sponsored event for Kat and her fellow influencers, which Rob leaves dismissed and irritated by Kat. That night, Simon and Cherise heavily advise Rob not to talk to her final ex: Mac. Instead, Rob decides to show up to Mac's apartment unannounced. They share a drink and at first things seem well, until Rob brings up Lily. She leaves, upset that she could not bring herself to ask Mac why he left her and smokes alone in her apartment in frustration.
5	"Uptown"	Jeffrey Reiner	E.T. Feigenbaum & Zoë Kravitz	February 14, 2020
Noureen (Parker Posey) invites Rob uptown to buy her ex husbands record collection. Rob enlists Clyde for a ride. The collection is extensive and rare, but as a jab to her ex husband, Noureen (an eclectic artist) wants to sell it for only $20. Rob refuses, until she tracks down the ex husband and decides for herself he is unworthy of the collection. She returns to Noureen but cannot complete the transaction - Clyde sneakily swipes Rob's favorite album, a David Bowie with a typo. Their goodbye is strained and confusing to them both.
6	"Weird...But Warm"	Natasha Lyonne	Celeste Hughey	February 14, 2020
Rob hooks up with Tim Parker, despite her reservations about his age and fame.
7	"Me Time"	Jeffrey Reiner	Franklin Hardy	February 14, 2020
8	"Ballad of the Lonesome Loser"	Jeffrey Reiner	Solomon Georgio	February 14, 2020
9	"Fun Rob"	Chioke Nassor	Veronica West, Sarah Kucserka, and Leigh Ann Biety	February 14, 2020
10	"The Other Side of the Rock"	Jeffrey Reiner	Veronica West	February 14, 2020

== Production ==
=== Development ===
On April 5, 2018, Disney announced it was developing a television series adaptation of their 2000 Touchstone film High Fidelity to be written by Veronica West and Sarah Kucserka with the intention of distributing it through their then-unnamed upcoming streaming service, now known as Disney+. Production companies involved with the series were slated to consist of Midnight Radio and ABC Signature Studios. On September 24, 2018, it was announced that Disney had given the production a series order for a first season consisting of ten episodes. Executive producers were expected to include West, Kucserka, Josh Appelbaum, Andre Nemec, Jeff Pinkner, Scott Rosenberg, and Zoë Kravitz. On April 9, 2019, it was announced that the series has been moved from Disney+ to Hulu. In July 2019, during an interview, Natasha Lyonne revealed that she was directing an episode of High Fidelity. On August 5, 2020, Hulu canceled the series after one season.

=== Casting ===
Alongside the series order announcement, it was confirmed that Zoë Kravitz, whose mother Lisa Bonet appeared in the 2000 film adaptation, would star in the series. On April 22, 2019, it was announced that Jake Lacy had been cast as a series regular. On May 17, 2019, it was reported that Da'Vine Joy Randolph and David Holmes had joined the main cast. In the same month, Kingsley Ben-Adir was cast in a guest starring role.

=== Filming ===
The principal photography started around July 2019 in Brooklyn.

== Release ==
=== Broadcast ===
High Fidelity premiered on February 14, 2020. The first three episodes were also aired on March 16, 2020, on Freeform. Internationally, the series premiered on February 21, 2020, in Canada on Starz and on May 1, 2020, in Australia on ABC iview and ABC Comedy. It was also released in select territories like Australia, the UK and Canada on Disney+ under the Star content hub and on Star+ in Latin America.

=== Marketing ===
The first set of images were released in late October 2019 with the announcement of series premiere date. The teaser trailer for the series was released on December 20, 2019

== Reception ==
=== Critical response ===
On the review aggregator website Rotten Tomatoes, the series holds an 86% approval rating with 70 reviews, with an average rating of 7.79/10. The website's critical consensus states, "Though it skips the occasional beat, High Fidelity's fresh take on a familiar track is as witty as it is emotionally charged, giving the charming and curmudgeonly Zoë Kravitz plenty of room to shine." On Metacritic, it has a weighted average score of 70 out of 100, based on 28 critics, indicating "generally favorable reviews".

=== Accolades ===
Year	Award	Category	Nominee(s)	Result	Ref
2020	Hollywood Critics Association Midseason Awards	Best New Streaming Series (Comedy)	High Fidelity	Nominated	
2021	Guild of Music Supervisors Awards	Best Music Supervision for Television Comedy or Musical	Manish Raval, Alison Rosenfeld Moses, and Tom Wolfe	Won	
2021	Satellite Awards	Best Actress in a Series, Comedy or Musical	Zoë Kravitz	Nominated	
