= Firehouse (1997 film) =

- Genre: Drama
- Written by: Tom Fontana
- Directed by: Alan Smithee (John McNaughton)
- Starring: Richard Dean Anderson; Lillo Brancato Jr. Morris Chestnut; Edie Falco; Burt Young
- Music by: David Darlington; Steven Rosen
- Country of origin: United States
- Original language: English

Production
- Executive producers: Richard Dean Anderson; Jim Finnerty; Tom Fontana; Michael Greenburg
- Producer: Debbie Sarjeant
- Production location: New York City
- Cinematography: Frank Prinzi; Fred Schuler
- Editors: Gregg Featherman; Cindy Mollo
- Running time: 90 min.
- Production companies: Fatima Productions; Gekko Film Corp. Rysher Entertainment

Original release
- Release: December 1997

Firehouse is a 1997 dramatic television film about a firehouse crew who are dealing with fact that the firehouse is being consolidated with an EMS unit, and with a sniper who keeps shooting at them at fire locations.

== Plot ==
Chief Shea keeps dreaming about an accident that put one of his firefighters, Eddie McCarthy, in the burn ward. Lt. Michael Brooks is struggling with his divorce and Andre's girlfriend leaves him because she fears losing him every time he leaves to fight a fire. The firehouse is consolidated with the EMS unit and must remove their barbecue to make room for the ambulance as well as allow EMS rescue worker Kate Wilkinson to sleep in their firehouse. Chief Frank Shea and many of the other firefighters are not pleased about the situation and are unsociable.

They respond to a building fire where Lt. Brooks is shot by a sniper who has previously attacked them on several occasions. Frustrated by the lack of progress with the investigation, Luvullo gets into a fistfight with one of the police officers called to investigate. Kate accompanies Lt. Brooks to the hospital in her ambulance, where a woman visits him. Once discharged, Brooks beings drinking again at the bar where his fellow firefighter Sy holds a second job. Another patron recommends wearing body armor to him.

Kate is visited by her husband Nick, who finds her in tears after being cursed at by one of the firefighters. He suggests quitting and having children but she insists that she is happy with her job. Luvullo takes Andre to a dance club to find a new girlfriend and they spot a blonde supermodel there. When she stops dancing with a man named Ronald and attempts to walk away, Ronald grabs her arm and they begin to argue as the paparazzi photograph the incident. O'Connell confronts Ronald and punches him, which is also photographed. Nick sees Andre on the street and threatens to come to the firehouse and beat up the firefighters with his friends when he is off duty. Chief Shea visits Eddie, who is visibly depressed. Eddie's wife Bridget tells Chief Shea that Eddie told her he wants to die. The firefighters are called to cut open a payphone to help a woman whose fingers are stuck in the coin return and leave behind Kate, who washes the Dalmatian. The photograph of Luvullo punching Ronald is published in the newspaper but when Chief Shea wants to talk about it Luvullo and Andre are called to deal with a stopped elevator. Lt. Brooks comes to the firehouse but Chief Shea will not let him return while he is still on medical leave. Reporter Patty Lyons wants to write a story about Brooks returning to work early and attempts to convince Chief Shea to let him return. The other truck is called to deal with a water leak, where they trace the cause to a dead man in a bathtub. Brooks visits his ex-wife and gives her the bullet because it was inside him.

They are called to a fire in a residential high-rise and must clear out the tenants. One resident becomes so hot that he attempts to jump out the window so Luvullo rappels down to the window from a higher floor to rescue the screaming man, who is upset by the discomfort of the rescue and ungratefully slaps Luvullo. Lt. Brooks is asked to pose for a photo op with the Commissioner but during it he hears a sound like a gunshot and flees in fear, finding five-year-old Danny in a nearby alley. Danny admits he started the fire playing at home alone while his parents were drinking at a local bar. After returning, Kate impatiently enters the showers before the men are finished, prompting them to leave. Danny's parents return to the bar and leave Danny with an aunt but he runs away to the firehouse. Chief Shea tries to convince Brooks not to get personally involved. The supermodel invites Luvullo to a party during a work shift. Luvullo says he will go but Andre convinces him to stay at work. Sy tells Brooks that child welfare is coming for Danny and suggests that he should have tried to have another child after his ex-wife had a miscarriage. Brooks buys a gun from Diebold and attempts to hunt the sniper but is shot through the heart. The cops lift a fingerprint from the scene and bring Sy with them to take in the suspect. The film ends with a funeral procession through the streets of the city with Michael's coffin on top of a firetruck with a police escort.

== Cast ==
- Richard Dean Anderson as Lt. Michael Brooks
- Lillo Brancato Jr. as Gaetano Luvullo
- Morris Chestnut as Andre
- Edie Falco as Kate Wilkinson
- Burt Young as Chief Frank Shea
- Dean Winters as Nick Wilkinson
- Gia Carides as Charlotte Brooks
- Ed Hodson as Fireman
- Michael Imperioli as Lt. O'Connell
- Skipp Sudduth as Sy
- Howard Safir as Fire Commissioner
- Eugene Ashe as Doo Wop Singer
- Firdous Bamji as E.R. Doctor
- Joe Brosi as Firefighter
- Tandy Cronyn as Female Victim
- David C. Dangerfield as Firefighter
- Sara Dawson as Supermodel
- Timothy Devlin as Police Sergeant
- Jeffrey Force as Willie Schillinger
- Denise George as Tamara
- Ray Grawin as Firefighter
- Murphy Guyer as Det. Leo Patillo
- Allyson Hamilton as Betty
- Juan Hernandez as Uniform Cop
- Jacqueline Kreiss as Rosalie
- Billy Malone as Paramedic
- Sam Melisi
- Charlotte Moore as Catlin Connors
- Carl Paoli as Screaming Man
- Phil Parolisi as Diebold
- Elizabeth Reilly as Alice Shillinger
- Pete Romeo as Firefighter
- Philip Scozzarella as Firefighter
- Brian Tarantina as Hooded Man
- Christopher Tracy as Firefighter
- Vincent Tumeo as Preppy Man
- Robert E. Weil as Store Owner
- Richard Ziman as Ken Schillinger

== Production ==
Music was provided by Dave Darlington & Steve Rosen as well as The Funky Poets for 23 West Productions. McNaughton chose to be credited as Alan Smithee.

== See also ==
- List of American films of 1997
- List of firefighting films
