= Sleeper Cell (TV series) =

- Title screen from the second series, Sleeper Cell: American Terror
- Genre: Thriller; Action
- Created by: Ethan Reiff; Cyrus Voris
- Starring: Michael Ealy; Oded Fehr; Henri Lubatti; Melissa Sagemiller
- Country of origin: United States
- No. of seasons: 2
- No. of episodes: 18

Production
- Running time: 60 minutes

Original release
- Network: Showtime
- Release: December 4, 2005 – December 17, 2006

Sleeper Cell is an American television drama series on the Showtime network that began airing on December 4, 2005. The tagline for the first season was "Friends. Neighbors. Husbands. Terrorists." and the tagline for the second season was "Cities. Suburbs. Airports. Targets." The series was nominated for an Emmy award for Outstanding Miniseries. The eight-episode second season of the series, titled Sleeper Cell: American Terror, premiered on December 10, 2006. Both seasons of Sleeper Cell were originally aired in an unusual fashion, by filming the entire season ahead of time and then airing the episodes on consecutive nights, such that each brand new season was aired for the first time over a period of less than two weeks. In Australia, both seasons originally aired on the Showtime Australia channel in 2006/2007. Re-runs as of 2008 have screened on the showcase channel (part of the Showtime Australia group of channels).

As extra material on the first season DVDs reveal, the show was originally named The Cell.

== Synopsis ==
Darwyn Al-Sayeed, a 30-year-old American undercover FBI agent who is a Muslim and embracing Islam as his religion, is assigned to infiltrate a terrorist sleeper cell that is planning an attack in Los Angeles. The cell is run by an Arab extremist named Faris al-Farik who disguises himself as a Jew. The members of the cell come from a variety of racial backgrounds and conflicting personalities. The series also portrays the hypocrisy and dichotomy of the cell members who claim to be Muslims but engage in behavior that is sinful in Islam (e.g. sex outside marriage) yet they profess a desire to be martyred for Islam. However, if they believe their lives are in danger if they do not conform to the vices of the host society, such behaviour is allowed under Taqiyya.

Darwyn is supervised by FBI senior agent Ray Fuller, also a close friend who worries for Darwyn's safety.

In the second season, Darwyn infiltrates a new cell that has formed to avenge the defeat of the original cell. When his second handler, Patrice Serxner, is killed in Sudan, Darwyn must try to work with yet another handler, Special Agent Russell. Meanwhile, his girlfriend Gayle is drawn deeper into the intrigue when she's caught between Russell, Darwyn and a member of the cell.

The writers once again offered a non-stereotypical mix of cell members, including a white European woman, a Latino-American man and, in a first for American television, a gay Muslim man.

== Cast ==
=== Season 1 ===
Actor	Role
Michael Ealy	Darwyn al-Sayeed (Alias: Darwyn al-Hakim)
Oded Fehr	Faris "Farik" al-Farik / Saad bin Safwan
Henri Lubatti	Ilija Korjenić
Alex Nesic	Christian Aumont
Blake Shields	Thomas "Tommy" Allen Emerson
Melissa Sagemiller	Gayle Bishop

==== Recurring ====
- James LeGros—Special Agent Ray Fuller
- Albert Hall—The Librarian
- Michael Desante—FBI Special Agent Alim Saleh
- Joshua Feinman—FBI Tech
- Sonya Walger—Special Agent Patrice Serxner
- Megan Ward—Mrs. Fuller
- John Fletcher—Deputy Attorney General of the US
- Ally Walker—Lynn Ellen Emerson
- Raj Mann—Radical Muslim Man
- Luis Chavez—Khashul
- Saïd Taghmaoui—Hamid
- Amro Salama-Abbas

=== Season 2 ===
Actor	Role
Michael Ealy	Darwyn al-Sayeed (Alias: Darwyn al-Hakim)
Oded Fehr	Faris "Farik" al-Farik
Henri Lubatti	Ilija Korjenić
Omid Abtahi	Salim
Kevin Alejandro	Benito 'Benny' Velasquez
Thekla Reuten	Mina
Melissa Sagemiller	Gayle Bishop

==== Recurring ====
- Jay R. Ferguson—Special Agent Russell
- Michael Rady - Jason
- Susan Pari - Samia
- Sarah Shahi - Farah
- Angela Gots - Carli
- Yvette Nicole Brown - Fatima

== Crew ==
=== Writers ===
- Ethan Reiff
- Cyrus Voris
- Angel Dean Lopez
- Alexander Woo
- Kamran Pasha
- Katherine Lingenfelter
- Andrew Barrett
- Nina Fiore (writers' assistant)

=== Directors ===
- Ziad Doueiri
- Guy Ferland
- Nick Gomez
- Leon Ichaso
- Leslie Libman
- Vondie Curtis-Hall
- Charles S. Dutton
- Clark Johnson (Pilot Episode)

=== Sound department ===
- Paul Haslinger (Composer)
- Joe Earle (Sound Re-Recording Mixer)
- Elmo Ponsdomenech (Sound Re-Recording Mixer)
- Mark Kamps (Supervising Sound Editor)
- Kevin Roache (Sound Recordist)
- Matt Fausak (Music Editor)

== Episodes ==
=== Season 1: (2005) ===
Season one aired from December 4, 2005, to December 18, 2005. The original airdates (U.S.) are listed here for each episode.

No.	Title	Directed by	Written by	Original release date	Prod. code
1	"Al-Fatiha"	Clark Johnson	Cyrus Voris & Ethan Reiff	December 4, 2005	101
A federal agent, Darwyn Al-Sayeed, goes undercover in Los Angeles to try and infiltrate a group of Islamic terrorists. Darwyn is introduced to Faris al-Farik, an Islamic extremist who is the leader of a sleeper cell. Farik becomes suspicious and drives Darwyn, Bobby and the other Cell members to the middle of the desert. He then starts to question the group and proclaims there is a "traitor" among them – placing Darwyn’s mission and life in danger.
2	"Target"	Guy Ferland	Cyrus Voris & Ethan Reiff	December 5, 2005	102
Farik recruits another Cell member, bio-chemical student Eddy Pangetsu, to test the anthrax that he and Ilija have received. Darwyn learns that the Cell is planning an anthrax attack inside a mall and tries to inform the FBI of where and when, but it turns out the anthrax was fake and just a rehearsal.
3	"Money"	Leon Ichaso	Cyrus Voris & Ethan Reiff	December 6, 2005	103
Farik discovers that the money supply coming in from Mexico to finance Youmud Din has ceased. So, Farik, Darwyn and Christian cross the border to Tijuana, Mexico, and try to find a way to straighten out their financial troubles.
4	"Scholar"	Nick Gomez	Kamran Pasha	December 7, 2005	104
Farik decides to send biochemical student Eddy Pangetsu on a flight to Vancouver. There he must drive a shipment of real anthrax across the Canada–US border to Los Angeles. At the same time, Abdal Malik, a moderate religious scholar and deprogrammer from Yemen arrives on a visit to the US.
5	"Soldier"	Guy Ferland	Janet Tamaro	December 11, 2005	105
The Cell members end up posing as Iraqi insurgents-in-training to infiltrate and take over a warehouse to make it the new base of operations for Youmid Din.
6	"Family"	Leslie Libman	Michael C. Martin	December 12, 2005	106
Darwyn tries to get close to a chemical plant worker in the hopes of trying to acquire some of the company's product for the Cell.
7	"Immigrant"	Ziad Doueiri	Alexander Woo	December 13, 2005	107
Farik attends a meeting with cell leaders in Las Vegas as they finalize their plans for a date for their possible attack. Meanwhile, an Afghani boy comes to the warehouse in the hopes of becoming a jihadist himself.
8	"Intramural"	Nick Gomez	Alexander Woo	December 14, 2005	108
The Cell works out a deal with white supremacists so they can acquire a large amount of explosives. The LAPD then sets up a surveillance on Darwyn after Gayle Bishop contacts them, which endangers his cover and gets the FBI's attention.
9	"Hijack/Youmud Din (Part 1)"	Rick Wallace	Kamran Pasha	December 18, 2005	109
The Cell hijacks a truck in order to acquire its contents - a deadly chemical to be used in their attack. The FBI holds off on stopping the Cell in the hopes of getting more information on the other two cells operating in the U.S. To be continued...
10	"Hijack/Youmud Din (Part 2)"	Rick Wallace	Cyrus Voris & Ethan Reiff	December 18, 2005	110
Judgement Day has arrived and Farik is not yet out of surprises. A surprise diversion proves effective in allowing the Cell to escape their surveillance. A quick thinking Darwyn leaves a clue that he hopes will lead the FBI to the target location in time.

=== Season 2: (2006) ===
Season two aired from December 10, 2006, to December 17, 2006. There were several cast changes in season two. Thekla Reuten, Omid Abtahi, and Kevin Alejandro joined the main cast as Mina, Salim and Benny, respectively. The original airdates (U.S.) are listed here for each episode.

No.	Title	Directed by	Written by	Original release date	Prod. code
11	"Al-Baqara"	Clark Johnson	Cyrus Voris & Ethan Reiff	December 10, 2006	201
Several months after successfully foiling a terrorist attack, FBI agent Darwyn Al-Sayeed is assigned to infiltrate another sleeper cell. Meanwhile, terrorist leader Faris Al-Farik endures CIA interrogation. Ilija, who managed to escape the authorities, has found refuge with a young woman who believes he is the victim of a government conspiracy and makes plans to escape the country.
12	"Salesman"	Charles S. Dutton	Alexander Woo	December 11, 2006	202
Having found himself thrust into the position as leader of the new Los Angeles Cell, Darwyn must protect his cover and work with the terrorists to unmask their secret attack plan. Meanwhile, Farik’s interrogators try a surprising new method to get the terrorist leader to cooperate and give up crucial information.
13	"Torture"	Vondie Curtis-Hall	Kamran Pasha	December 12, 2006	203
Darwyn is ordered by a terrorist group to get a weapon, but the FBI does not want to cooperate. Ilija prepares to run away to Europe. Farik is sent to Saudi Arabia where torture is allowed.
14	"Faith"	Guy Ferland	Angel Dean Lopez	December 13, 2006	204
Darwyn risks blowing his cover to save an Islamic televangelist. Salim struggles with a painful secret. Farik escapes from prison in Saudi Arabia and finds a place to hide with Al-Qaeda.
15	"Homecoming"	Charles S. Dutton	Katherine Lingenfelter	December 14, 2006	205
The expected shipment of nuclear material into the Port of Los Angeles has the FBI ready to take down the cell. Gayle turns to Russell to deal with an ugly custody dispute. Darwyn faces his father's disapproval. Mina is blackmailed by her lecherous boss. Farik forces his daughter to make a painful choice.
16	"School"	Leslie Libman	Andrew Barrett	December 15, 2006	206
Farik goes to visit a school in Yemen. Ilija tries to start a new life back in Bosnia. Darwyn adjusts to a demotion in leadership. Salim has another encounter with Jason. Mina invites Gayle to an Islamic women's group, which Russell forces her to attend. A midnight exhumation is conducted and the cell recovers smuggled nuclear fuel rods.
17	"Fitna"	Nick Gomez	Kamran Pasha & Alexander Woo	December 16, 2006	207
Mina kidnaps Gayle and forces her to drive to Las Vegas. En route, Gayle fights back and Mina kills her. The FBI raids cell headquarters but Salim escapes with the fuel rods. Salim improvises a dirty bomb and with an unwitting Jason in tow tries to set it off at the Hollywood Bowl, but is killed. In Las Vegas, Mina carries out a suicide bombing at a veterans' gathering.
18	"Reunion"	Charles S. Dutton	Ethan Reiff & Cyrus Voris	December 17, 2006	208
Darwyn uses Samia to try to get close to Farik in Yemen. Farik realizes Darwyn is FBI and takes him captive. Darwyn orchestrates a missile attack on Farik's camp and Samia is killed. Darwyn and Farik battle. Both are wounded. Farik escapes and the season ends with Darwyn begging for help in a village street.

== Home media ==
=== Region 1 DVD ===
DVD name	Release date	No. of episodes	Additional information
Sleeper Cell	March 14, 2006	10	The entire first season of Sleeper Cell was released as a widescreen three-disc Region 1 DVD box set in the U.S. on March 14, 2006. It was distributed by Showtime Entertainment. In addition to all the episodes that had aired, it included several DVD extras such as episode commentaries by executive producers Ethan Reiff and Cyrus Voris, behind-the-scenes footage and making-of features as well as deleted scenes with optional commentary.
Sleeper Cell: American Terror - The Complete Second Season	March 20, 2007	8	The entire second season of Sleeper Cell: American Terror was released as a three-disc Region 1 DVD box set in the U.S. on March 20, 2007. The box for the DVD mistakenly lists the Season 1 cast on the back.

=== Region 2 DVD ===
DVD name	Release date	No. of episodes	Additional information
Sleeper Cell	September 18, 2006	10	The entire first season of Sleeper Cell was released as a widescreen four-disc Region 2 DVD digipak in Europe on September 18, 2006. It was distributed by Tla Releasing. In addition to all the episodes that had aired, it included the same DVD extras as the Region 1 release, such as episode commentaries by executive producers Ethan Reiff and Cyrus Voris, behind-the-scenes footage and making-of features as well as deleted scenes with optional commentary.

=== Region 4 DVD ===
DVD name	Release date	No. of episodes	Additional information
Sleeper Cell	August 17, 2006	10	The entire first season of Sleeper Cell was released as a widescreen four-disc Region 4 DVD box set in Australia on August 17, 2006. It was distributed by Road Show Video. In addition to all the episodes that had aired, it included DVD extras such as episode commentaries by executive producers Ethan Reiff and Cyrus Voris, behind-the-scenes footage and making-of features as well as deleted scenes with optional commentary. In addition to the bonus material included on the Region 1 release, the DVD set featured audio interviews with cast and crew members.
