= Jennifer Aspen =

American actress

- Born: October 9, 1970 (age 55); Richmond, Virginia, U.S.
- Occupation: Actress
- Years active: 1995–present
- Spouse: David O'Donnell (m. 2006)
- Children: 1
- Website: jenniferaspen.com

Jennifer Aspen (born October 9, 1970) is an American actress, best known for her roles as Daphne Jablonsky in the Fox teen drama series Party of Five (1998–2000), as Trina Hamilton in ABC family sitcom Rodney (2004–2006), as Kendra Giardi in the first season of the Fox musical comedy series Glee and as Sharon Peacham on ABC comedy-drama GCB (2012).

== Career ==
Aspen made her debut in 1995, and later began playing guest-starring roles in number of television shows, like Hope and Gloria, Beverly Hills, 90210 and Married... with Children. In 1996 she made her film debut with a co-starring role in the family comedy A Very Brady Sequel and horror film Sometimes They Come Back... Again. She also guest-starred in Will & Grace, Friends, Grey's Anatomy, Shark, Boston Legal, The Closer, Criminal Minds, Supernatural, CSI: Crime Scene Investigation and Private Practice.

Aspen had series regular role in the Fox teen drama series Party of Five from 1998 to 2000. In 2001, she starred in the short-lived sitcom Bob Patterson. From 2004 to 2006, she starred in the ABC sitcom Rodney opposite Rodney Carrington. The series was canceled after two seasons. In 2009, she appeared in a recurring role of Fox comedy series Glee, as Kendra Giardi.

In 2011, Aspen was cast as one of leads in ABC comedy series GCB. she starred in show as Sharon Peacham, a former beauty queen who was the envy of all the guys and girls in high school on the, with Leslie Bibb, Kristin Chenoweth, Annie Potts, Miriam Shor and Marisol Nichols. She also appeared in Kristin Chenoweth's music video for I Want Somebody (Bitch About). The series debuted on ABC in mid-season, on March 4, 2012, and was cancelled after single season. She later starred as lead in the independent comedy Nowhere Girl, and appeared in 2013 Lifetime movie, The Wrong Woman.

In 2018, Aspen was cast opposite Amy Adams in the HBO eight-episode miniseries Sharp Objects. Also that year, she was cast as a series regular opposite Annie Ilonzeh in the ABC drama pilot Staties.

== Personal life ==
Aspen was born in Richmond, Virginia, and resides in Los Angeles. She graduated from Santa Cruz Highschool class of 1988. She attended the UCLA School of Theater, Film and Television, where she received a BA in Theater. She then studied acting at the Beverly Hills Playhouse. Aspen married her longtime boyfriend of nine years, David O'Donnell, on September 3, 2006. She is a practicing Scientologist. Her adopted baby girl, Charlotte Sofia O'Donnell, was born June 10, 2012.

== Filmography ==
=== Film ===
Year	Title	Role	Notes
1996	Sometimes They Come Back... Again	Maria Moore	
1996	A Very Brady Sequel	Kathy Lawrence	
1996	The Secret She Carried	Toni	Television film
1997	The Others	Vicky Myers	
1997	Changing Habits	Art Store Customer	
1998	Screwed: A Hollywood Bedtime Story	Susie Felton	
2000	Some Common Things That Happen to Corpses	Jennifer Oberon	
2001	See Jane Run	Jennifer	
2001	Vanilla Sky	Nina	
2004	L.A. Twister	Mindy	
2004	The Ranch	Shayna	Television film
2005	Guy in Row Five	Sarah	
2007	The Frolic	Leslie Munck	
2007	Mr. Woodcock	Cindy	
2008	Struck	Jennifer	
2010	Melon	Jennifer	
2010	Unanswered Prayers	Jeanette	Television film
2012	Girl vs. Monster	Julie Lewis	Television film
2013	Nowhere Girl	Michelle	
2013	The Wrong Woman	Alice	Television film
2014	At the Devil's Door	Lori	
2015	His Secret Life		Television film
2016	Holiday Breakup	Mandy	
2018	Staties	Scott	Television movie; Completed
2019	A Christmas Love Story	Julie	Television film
2021	You Had Me at Aloha	Millie	Television film
2022	A Cozy Christmas Inn	Claire	Television film
2023	Haul Out the Holly: Lit Up	Jane Johnson	Television film

=== Television ===
Year	Title	Role	Notes
1995	Hope and Gloria	Alexis	Episode: "A Fine ROM-ance"
1995	Beverly Hills, 90210	Runaway Girl	Episode: "Squash It"
1995	Married... with Children	Jamie	Episode: "Guess Who's Coming to Breakfast, Lunch and Dinner"
1995	Step by Step	Pepper	Episode: "Lil Sister Dontcha"
1995	Too Something		Episode: "Leg, Lies and Videotape"
1996	In the House	Mrs. Jones	Episode: "To Die For"
1996	Brotherly Love	Melanie Marcos	Episode: "Other People"
1996	Living Single	Irene	Episode: "School's Out Forever"
1996	Chicago Hope	Tracey White	Episode: "A Day in the Life"
1995–1996	Weird Science	Sharon	2 episodes
1997–1998	Claude's Crib	Julie	Series regular, 10 episodes
1997	NYPD Blue	Candice	Episode: "Taillight's Last Gleaming"
1997	Alright Already	Debbie	Episode: "Again with the Sponge Cake"
1998	The Pretender	Anna Roemer	Episode: "Indy Show"
1998	House Rules	Terry	Episode: "Twisted Sister"
1998–2000	Party of Five	Daphne Jablonsky	Series regular, 35 episodes
2000	FreakyLinks	Vikki	Episode: "Subject: Three Thirteen"
2001	Bob Patterson	Janet Patterson	Series regular, 10 episodes
2002	Will & Grace	Sarah	Episode: "Dyeing Is Easy, Comedy Is Hard"
2002	The Court	Emily	2 episodes
2002	The King of Queens	Samantha	Episode: "Flash Photography"
2002	CSI: Crime Scene Investigation	Mrs. Ramsey	Episode: "Fight Night"
2003	Friends	Michelle	Episode: "The One Where Monica Sings"
2003	The Agency	Livia	Episode: "Coventry"
2003	Karen Sisco	Angie Stoller	Episode: "Dear Derwood..."
2003	The Lyon's Den	Tara Barrington	2 episodes
2003	Line of Fire	Jolene Fleming	Episode: "Mockingbird"
2004	Come to Papa	Karen	4 episodes
2004–2006	Rodney	Trina Hamilton	Series regular, 44 episodes
2006	Welcome to the Jungle Gym	Annabelle	TV Pilot
2006	Grey's Anatomy	Elena	Episode: "Don't Stand So Close to Me"
2007	Shark	April George	Episode: "Starlet Fever"
2007	Boston Legal	Maureen Fleming	Episode: "The Good Lawyer"
2007	The Closer	Valerie Henry	2 episodes
2008	Family Man	Meg Parker	TV Pilot
2008	Criminal Minds	Laurie Ann Morris	Episode: "A Higher Power"
2008	Eli Stone	Dr. Leila Maxford	Episode: "Patience"
2009	Glee	Kendra Giardi	4 episodes
2010	Supernatural	Marcy Ward	Episode: "Weekend at Bobby's"
2010	CSI: Crime Scene Investigation	Stacy Cano	Episode: "Wild Life"
2011	Bleep My Dad Says	Mary	Episode: "Goodson Goes Deep"
2011	Private Practice	Lara	Episode: "Two Steps Back"
2012	Harry's Law	Tina Stanhope	Episode: "Breaking Points"
2012	GCB	Sharon Peacham	Series regular, 10 episodes
2013	Untitled Tad Quill Project	Jennifer	TV Pilot
2013	Franklin & Bash	Rayanne Gardner	Episode: "By the Numbers"
2013	Two and a Half Men	Stephanie	Episode: "Clank, Clank, Drunken Skank"
2014	Damaged Goods	Alexis	TV Pilot
2015	Scream Queens	Mandy Greenwell	Episode: "Haunted House"
2016	The Night Shift	Joan Watkins	2 episodes
2017	Nicky, Ricky, Dicky & Dawn	Aunt Jackie	Episode: QUADGOALS
2018	Sharp Objects	Jeannie Keene	4 episodes
2018	9-1-1	Lorraine Collins	2 episodes
2018	The Good Doctor	Iris Bautista	Episode: "Two Ply (or Not Ply)
