= Sorority Boys =

2002 American comedy film directed by Wallace Wolodarsky

- Theatrical release poster
- Directed by: Wallace Wolodarsky
- Written by: Joe Jarvis; Greg Coolidge
- Produced by: Larry Brezner; Walter Hamada; Michael Fottrell
- Starring: Barry Watson; Harland Williams; Michael Rosenbaum; Melissa Sagemiller; Heather Matarazzo
- Cinematography: Michael D. O'Shea
- Edited by: Richard Halsey
- Music by: Mark Mothersbaugh
- Production company: Touchstone Pictures
- Distributed by: Buena Vista Pictures Distribution
- Release date: March 22, 2002
- Running time: 93 minutes
- Country: United States
- Language: English
- Budget: $12 million
- Box office: $12.5 million

Sorority Boys is a 2002 American comedy film directed by Wallace Wolodarsky, about a group of college boys who dress up as girls in order to prove their innocence for a crime they did not commit. The film starred Barry Watson, Michael Rosenbaum and Harland Williams.

== Plot ==
Dave, Adam, and Robert (known as "Doofer"), three members of the Kappa Omicron Kappa fraternity who are in charge of protecting the Fraternity treasury, are accused of stealing all the money and are run out of the house. Doofer suggests that they find the real thief by reviewing tapes from Adam's room, which Adam has rigged with a video camera in order to surreptitiously and illegally record his sexual conquests. In order to enter the house, the three dress up as "Adina," "Roberta," and "Daisy" to attend a ladies night party at the frat. The other brothers mistake the three boys for tall, ugly girls from Delta Omicron Gamma (DOG) in which they play "DOG Catcher" and throw them out of the house. The women of the DOG sorority, a sorority focused on fighting misogyny, rescue them and invite them to stay at their sorority house.

Adam learns that Jimmy, his personal KOK pledge and the MC (Master of Ceremonies), has moved into his old room. He decides to dress as Adina and seduce Jimmy so he can get the tape. He plans to give Jimmy a roofie pill to make him fall asleep. However, Jimmy, thinking Adam is a woman, slips him a roofie as well and both pass out. Adam wakes up the next day to find that he has been added to the Wall of Shame, like every other Sorority girl on campus. Dave as "Daisy" becomes acquainted with Leah, and even attended class with her, back as Dave.

The three boys learn that the KOKs are bringing Adam's tapes onto the annual KOK-Tail Cruise to serve as entertainment for the alumni. They help the DOG sisters win an all-girl football game against the Tri-Pi's, knowing that tickets to the cruise are the prize. Regardless, KOK chose to bring the Tri-Pi's on the Cruise instead. "Daisy", "Adina", and "Roberta", along with the rest of DOG, hijacked a speed boat to infiltrate the Cruise, incapacitating the Tri-Pi's and marooning them onto a floating raft. Leah dances with Dave/Daisy and confesses to wanting a relationship. "Daisy," knowing the ruse will end soon when the group finds the tape, tells Leah "she" is moving back to Minnesota.

Daisy changes back into Dave for a job interview with an alumnus. After the interview, the three boys change back into their feminine garb and share a group hug in celebration. Leah walks in while Daisy and Adina are embracing and mistakenly thinks that they are in a relationship and the "Minnesota" excuse was fake. She storms out with Daisy following her.

The alumnus later grabs Leah on the rear and she slaps him across the face. He decides to play "DOG Catcher" with his fellow alumnus and calls for Leah to be thrown overboard. Daisy reveals her true identity as Dave to stop the men, including his father, while Roberta is exposed as Doofer when he is caught with the tape, and Adina is exposed as Adam. The KOK High Council convenes to determine their fate, with Dave lamenting the way they have historically treated the DOGs and states he no longer wants to be a member of KOK. Dave accuses fraternity president Spence of stealing the money, and Doofer produces the tape to prove it. On the video it shows Spence stealing the money as revenge against Dave, Adam, and Doofer, The KOKs and the alumnus dethrone Spence and toss him overboard.

Later, at the KOK house, Adam is named president. Dave meets with Leah and starts their relationship over, truthfully this time, and Doofer begins a relationship with one of the DOG girls. The rest of KOK make amends with DOG. The Tri-Pi's are still lost at sea.

== Cast ==
- Barry Watson as Dave / Daisy
- Michael Rosenbaum as Adam / Adina
- Harland Williams as Doofer / Roberta
- Melissa Sagemiller as Leah
- Tony Denman as Jimmy
- Brad Beyer as Spence Rivington
- Kathryn Stockwood as Patty
- Heather Matarazzo as Katie
- Yvonne Sciò as Frederique
- Omar Benson Miller as "Big" Johnson
- Mike Beaver as Big Fat Frat
- Peter Scolari as Louis
- Bree Turner as Tiffany
- James Daughton as Dave's Dad
- Mark Metcalf as John Kloss
- Stephen Furst as The Alum
- John Vernon as Old Man
- Brian Posehn as Haggard Alum

== Reception ==
The film was panned by critics. On Rotten Tomatoes, it has an approval rating of 12% based on 65 reviews, with an average score of 3.22/10. The website's consensus reads: "A sloppy fratboy movie, Sorority Boys offers up a parade of gross-out gags and sex jokes, while insulting and ogling women." Metacritic, which uses a weighted average, assigned the film a score of 25 out of 100, based on 20 critics, indicating "generally unfavorable" reviews.

The film barely made back its $12 million budget, grossing a worldwide total of $12,517,488.

Lisa Schwarzbaum of Entertainment Weekly gave the film a score of a "B", saying that "There are moments of real funniness in this smarter-than-anticipated goof-fest".

Ed Gonzalez of Slant Magazine gave the film 1.5 stars out of 5, explaining his reasoning by the fact that "Sorority Boys only confirms the threat posed to the film industry when homo-wary frat boys are allowed to play director".

The New York Times's A. O. Scott criticized the film's director, saying that "[he] has made a film that even a rabid lowbrow like Homer Simpson (or, when the mood strikes, this critic) would find beneath his dignity".

== See also ==
- Cross-dressing in film and television
