= Claude's Crib =

- Genre: Comedy
- Created by: Claude Brooks; Linda M. Yearwood
- Starring: Claude Brooks; Tembi Locke; Jennifer Aspen; Matt Champagne; Anthony C. Hall; James Wong; Larry Hankin
- Country of origin: United States
- Original language: English
- No. of seasons: 1
- No. of episodes: 13 (4 unaired)

Production
- Executive producers: Bill Boulware; Claude Brooks
- Producers: Jay Abramowitz; David Menteer
- Running time: 22 minutes
- Production company: Paramount Television

Original release
- Network: USA Network
- Release: January 5 – March 2, 1997

Claude's Crib is an American comedy television series created by Claude Brooks and Linda M. Yearwood. The series stars Claude Brooks, Tembi Locke, Jennifer Aspen, Matt Champagne, Anthony C. Hall, James Wong and Larry Hankin. The series aired on USA Network from January 5, 1997, to March 2, 1997.

== Premise ==
Claude DuPree was living the high life as a DJ and a sex fiend until one day he learns that his grandmother had died. He inherits her house she left behind and becomes the new landlord. He is now responsible for keeping the house well-maintained and keeping tabs on his new, multi-racial tenants paying the rent, among other things.

== Cast ==
- Claude Brooks as Claude DuPree
- Tembi Locke as Kaylene Johnson
- Jennifer Aspen as Julie West
- Matt Champagne as Bailey Wilkerson
- Anthony C. Hall as "Shorty" Lattimore
- James Wong as Desmond "Des" Fong
- Larry Hankin as Al Potts

== Episodes ==
No.	Title	Directed by	Written by	Original release date
1	"Pilot"	Rob Schiller	Brian Gewirtz	January 5, 1997
2	"Room Without a Clue"	Unknown	Brian Gewirtz	January 12, 1997
3	"Trading Places"	Unknown	Brian Gewirtz	January 19, 1997
4	"Don't Bet on It"	Unknown	Brian Gewirtz	January 26, 1997
5	"It Didn't Happen One Night"	Unknown	Brian Gewirtz	February 2, 1997
6	"Cupid Is as Cupid Does"	Unknown	Jay Abramowitz & Brian Gewirtz	February 9, 1997
7	"Absence of Alice"	Unknown	Brian Gewirtz	February 16, 1997
8	"Clothes Encounter"	Unknown	Brian Gewirtz	February 23, 1997
9	"It's a Rap"	Unknown	Jay Abramowitz & Brian Gewirtz	March 2, 1997
10	"The Shorty End of the Stick"	N/A	N/A	Unaired
11	"Eastside, Westside Story"	N/A	N/A	Unaired
12	"Be That as It May"	N/A	N/A	Unaired
13	"Local Hero"	N/A	N/A	Unaired

== Slogan ==
- Claude always had big plans. Being a landlord was NOT one of them.
