= Kamran Pasha =

Television producer, television writer

Kamran Pasha (Urdu: کامران پاشا) is an American screenwriter, director and novelist of Pakistani Sindhi origin. He was a writer and producer on the NBC series Kings, after working as a producer on NBC's Bionic Woman. Previously, he was a co-producer and writer for Sleeper Cell, Showtime Network's terrorism drama. Sleeper Cell was nominated for the Golden Globe for Best Miniseries in 2005 and for an Emmy for Best Miniseries in 2006. Pasha has also written for The CW series Nikita, Reign and Roswell, New Mexico as well as the Disney XD animated show Tron: Uprising.

In 2011, Pasha was hired to rewrite a movie screenplay entitled "The Immaculate" for Sidney Kimmel Entertainment and producer Charles Segars. The film follows an agnostic government agent assigned to protect a 17-year-old boy who some people believe is the Messiah.

Pasha wrote his first video game for the hip hop artist 50 Cent in 2008. The game, 50 Cent: Blood on the Sand, is the sequel to the bestselling 50 Cent: Bulletproof and is distributed by Vivendi Games.

== Early career ==
Pasha was born in Karachi, Pakistan, and migrated to the United States at the age of three. He was raised in Brooklyn in the predominantly Hasidic Jewish neighborhood of Borough Park. He attended Stuyvesant High School in New York, graduating in 1989. He went on to Dartmouth College, where he majored in comparative religion and was an editor of the college newspaper, The Dartmouth.

After graduating, Pasha worked as a journalist for the Wall Street publisher Institutional Investor and the Knight Ridder financial newswire. During his tenure as a reporter, he interviewed international leaders such as the Israeli prime minister Shimon Peres, the Pakistani prime minister Benazir Bhutto, and the Peruvian president, Alberto Fujimori.

He left journalism in 1996 and attended Cornell Law School. He subsequently enrolled in the MBA program at the Tuck School of Business at Dartmouth, and graduated with a joint law/business degree in 2000.

== Move into film industry ==
Pasha briefly worked as an attorney at the New York law firm of Paul, Weiss, Rifkind, Wharton & Garrison before moving to Los Angeles to pursue a career in film making. He attended the MFA Producers Program at the UCLA School of Theater, Film and Television and graduated in 2003.

His first television writing job was as a staff writer on UPN's remake of the classic series The Twilight Zone.

In 2003, Pasha set up his first feature film project, a historical epic on the love story of the Taj Mahal, at Warner Brothers Pictures. He subsequently wrote a screen adaptation of the Japanese anime Kite in collaboration with the director Rob Cohen and the producer Anant Singh. He has also written screen adaptations of the Japanese horror film Ghost Actress by the director Hideo Nakata and adapted Deepak Chopra's novel, Soulmate.

Pasha spent two years as a writer and co-producer for Sleeper Cell. In 2007, he signed on as a producer of NBC's Bionic Woman.

Pasha wrote and directed the short film Miriam, which won the Gaia Award at the Moondance International Film Festival in August 2008. The award is given to those who "elucidate and improve the spiritual quality of all life on the planet, and contribute[...] to the betterment of the world spirit".

== Personal life ==
In 2008, Pasha accompanied his mother on the hajj, the traditional Islamic pilgrimage to Mecca. Pasha blogs regularly for the Huffington Post.

== Books ==
Pasha sold his first two novels to Simon & Schuster in 2007. The books are entitled Mother of the Believers, a historical epic that follows the birth of Islam from the eyes of the Islamic prophet Muhammad's wife Aisha, and Shadow of the Swords, a love story set amidst the showdown of Richard the Lionheart and Saladin during the Third Crusade.
