= Alex Nesic =

American actor (born 1976)

Alexander D. Nesic (born April 17, 1976) is a Serbian-French-American film and television actor, best known for his work in the miniseries Sleeper Cell.

== Early life and education ==
Born in Santa Barbara, California, and raised in Antibes, France and Hawaii, Nesic is of Serbian and French descent, and holds dual United States/French citizenship and speaks four languages fluently. He earned his B.A. in European History and Spanish Literature from Santa Clara University.

== Career ==
He has been featured in the feature films High Crimes, which starred Ashley Judd and Jim Caviezel, and the comedy What Boys Like. He played Christian Aumont on the TV series Sleeper Cell.

Nesic has also appeared in guest roles on CSI: Miami, JAG, As If, Angel, Felicity and Unhappily Ever After.

== Personal life ==
Nesic became engaged with fellow Sleeper Cell co-star Melissa Sagemiller after proposing to her in South of France in July 2006. The couple share two children.

== Partial filmography ==
- Unhappily Ever After (1 episode, 1998) (TV)
- Felicity (1 episode, 2000) (TV)
- The Groomsmen (2001)
- Angel (1 episode, 2001) (TV)
- As If (1 episode, 2002) (TV)
- High Crimes (2002)
- Crossing Jordan (1 episode, 2002) (TV)
- Journey Into Night (2002)
- JAG (1 episode, 2003) (TV)
- Malibu Eyes (2004) (V)
- CSI: Miami (1 episode, 2005) (TV)
- Sleeper Cell (10 episodes, 2005) (TV)
- NCIS (1 episode, 2006) (TV)
- Drifter (2007/I)
- Say It in Russian (2007)
- Eleventh Hour (1 episode, 2008) (TV)
- Dirty Sexy Money (2 episodes, 2007–2009) (TV)
- From Mexico with Love (2009)
- In Fidelity (2009)
- Undercovers (1 episode, 2010) (TV)
