= Veronica West =

American television producer, television writer

- Other name: Veronica Becker
- Occupations: Television producer, television writer
- Years active: 1999–present

Veronica West (née Becker) is an American television producer and writer.

Her credits include Mercy, Brothers & Sisters, GCB, Hart of Dixie and State of Affairs. In 2007, she won a Writers Guild of America, West Award for her work on the series Ugly Betty, sharing the award with the writing staff. She also developed and produced the TV-show High Fidelity starring Zoë Kravitz in 2020. She is the creator and showrunner of the AppleTV+ series Surface.

She is a graduate of Northwestern University.

== Filmography ==
=== Television ===
The numbers in writing credits refer to the number of episodes.

Key
†	Denotes television series that have not yet aired.

Title	Year	Credited as				Network	Notes
Title	Year	Creator	Producer	Writer	Executive producer	Network	Notes
Ugly Betty	2006–08	No	No	Yes (4)	No	ABC	Story editor (season 2)
Mode After Hours	2008	No	No	Yes (2)	No	ABC	Web series
Private	2009	No	No	Yes	No		Web series
Mercy	2009–10	No	No	Yes (3)	No	NBC	Executive story editor (6 episodes)
Brothers & Sisters	2010–11	No	No	Yes (4)	No	ABC	Co-producer (season 5)
GCB	2012	No	Yes	Yes (1)	No	ABC	Producer (9 episodes)
Hart of Dixie	2012–14	No	Yes	Yes (6)	No	The CW	Producer (season 2); Supervising producer (season 3: 10 episodes)
State of Affairs	2014–15	No	No	Yes (2)	No	NBC	Co-executive producer (12 episodes)
Chicago Fire	2015–17	No	No	Yes (6)	No	NBC	Co-executive producer (season 4, season 5: 13 episodes)
Bull	2017–18	No	No	Yes (6)	No	CBS	Co-executive producer (season 2: 19 episodes)
High Fidelity	2020	Developer	No	Yes (4)	Yes	Hulu	Showrunner
Dexter: New Blood	2021	No	No	Yes (2)	No	Showtime	Miniseries
Surface	2022	Yes	No	Yes (1)	Yes	Apple TV+	
