= Mr. Woodcock =

- Theatrical release poster
- Directed by: Craig Gillespie
- Written by: Michael Carnes; Josh Gilbert
- Produced by: Bob Cooper; David Dobkin
- Starring: Billy Bob Thornton; Seann William Scott; Susan Sarandon; Ethan Suplee; Melissa Sagemiller; Amy Poehler
- Cinematography: Tami Reiker
- Edited by: Alan Baumgarten
- Music by: Theodore Shapiro
- Distributed by: New Line Cinema
- Release date: September 14, 2007
- Running time: 87 minutes
- Country: United States
- Language: English
- Budget: $22 million
- Box office: $33.6 million

Mr. Woodcock is a 2007 American comedy film directed by Craig Gillespie (in his directorial debut), and starring Seann William Scott, Billy Bob Thornton, Susan Sarandon, Amy Poehler, and Ethan Suplee. The film was released by New Line Cinema on September 14, 2007 to mostly negative reviews and grossed $33.6 million against a $22 million budget.

== Plot ==
John Farley is a successful self-help author of the bestseller Letting Go: How to Get Past Your Past, who returns to his hometown in Nebraska to receive an award. John arrives home and learns that his widowed mother Beverly is dating his former P.E. teacher Jasper Woodcock. John disapproves of the relationship because he remembers Woodcock as an abusive bully.

Woodcock and Beverly become engaged and the majority of the film centers on John's attempts to convince his mother to break off the relationship, with the help of his best friend, Nedderman. John becomes increasingly obsessed with beating Woodcock at various competitions and with proving that Woodcock is not a suitable mate for Beverly. John's antics are so childish and extreme that his new love interest Tracy, a former classmate, refuses to see him again.

John is set to receive his award at the same ceremony where Woodcock will be presented with an award for being "Educator of the Year." Woodcock receives his award first and is praised by numerous members of the community for being a great teacher and influence on children. John is unconvinced and devotes his entire acceptance speech to explaining why Woodcock is the "biggest asshole on the planet." Woodcock and various crowd members refute John's points, and Woodcock then challenges John to a fight. Beverly witnesses the confrontation and dumps Woodcock.

The next day, John has a heart-to-heart conversation with his mother, who tells him that he always interfered with her attempts to date again and always put his own happiness ahead of hers. John realizes she is correct, and after cutting short a live interview on The Tyra Banks Show, John attempts to apologize to Woodcock. The two have a final exorcising fight, which leads to Woodcock suffering a concussion. John and Beverly visit Woodcock in the hospital and all three seemingly make peace. John declares that the key to life is not "getting past your past" but instead learning to embrace your past. He opines that Woodcock's vicious treatment in gym class helped him become the man he is today.

Woodcock and Beverly get married, John reunites with Tracy, and John goes on to write a second book entitled Backbone: The Definite Guide to Self Confidence.

== Cast ==
- Billy Bob Thornton as Jasper Woodcock
- Seann William Scott as John Farley
  - Kyley Baldridge as Young John Farley
- Susan Sarandon as Beverly Farley
- Ethan Suplee as Nedderman
  - Alec George as Young Nedderman
- Amy Poehler as Maggie Hoffman
- Melissa Sagemiller as Tracy Detweiller
- Bill Macy as Mr. Woodcock's father
- Tyra Banks as Herself
- Melissa Leo as Sally Jansen
- Jennifer Aspen as Cindy
- Allisyn Ashley Arm as Scout Girl
- M. C. Gainey as Hal the Barber

== Reception ==
On Rotten Tomatoes it has an approval rating of 14% based on 112 reviews. The site's consensus states, "Underutilizing a talented cast, Mr. Woodcock lacks the comic energy and timing to make the most of its intriguing premise." On Metacritic, the film has an average score of 41%, based on 25 reviews, indicating "mixed or average reviews". Audiences polled by CinemaScore gave the film an average grade of "B−" on an A+ to F scale.

Although the film was panned by most critics, Roger Ebert of the Chicago Sun-Times gave the film 3 out of 4 stars, praising Thornton for his performance.

Justin Chang of Variety called it "a wan comic effort barely elevated a few notches by Billy Bob Thornton's passive-aggressive villainy." Stephen Farber of The Hollywood Reporter wrote: "As Mr. Woodcock demonstrates, a great premise can generate a lot of goodwill and almost overcome an uneven script. So too can expert performances."

In a 2009 interview on The Opie & Anthony Show, Scott said that he and Thornton spent time on set discussing how terrible the movie was. Scott said "there's nothing worse than going to a movie set knowing that [the film] could end my career."

Gillespie also despised the end result. He left the project after negative test screenings, and many scenes were re-written and re-shot. David Dobkin replaced Gillespie in the director's role. Upon initially receiving the script, Gillespie had assumed that audiences would respond well to the dark humor he had been using in his commercials, but, according to him, "it was obvious the audience wanted a broader comedy, not the one I'd made. I appreciated the predicament New Line was in, so I stepped aside." Dobkin, however, went uncredited, leading Gillespie to take the blame.

== Home media ==
The Blu-ray Disc and DVD were released on January 15, 2008. The HD DVD version of the film was scheduled to be released shortly after the Blu-ray version, but Warner Bros./New Line's decision to exclusively support Blu-ray led to the cancellation of all New Line HD DVD titles (along with all Warner Bros. HD DVD titles after May 2008).
