= Melissa Sagemiller =

American actress

- Born: Washington, D.C., U.S.
- Occupation: Actress
- Years active: 2001–2014

Melissa Sagemiller is an American former actress, active from 2001 to 2014. She is known for her performances in films Get Over It (2001), Soul Survivors (2001), Sorority Boys (2002), The Clearing (2004), The Guardian (2006) and Mr. Woodcock (2007). Sagemiller also starred in television dramas Sleeper Cell (2005–06), and Raising the Bar (2008–09), and from 2010 to 2011 had the recurring role as A.D.A. Gillian Hardwicke in the Law & Order: Special Victims Unit.

== Early life ==
Sagemiller was born in Washington, D.C., to Donna Sagemiller, a political activist mother who worked as a comptroller during Jimmy Carter's presidency.

== Career ==
Sagemiller studied at the Stella Adler Conservatory, New York University's Stonestreet Studio and at Michael Howard Studios. She was mentioned in Movieline magazine in August 2001. In November 2001, Sagemiller appeared in Gear magazine. In her early career, she starred on number of teen films, like Get Over It and Sorority Boys, and was lead actress in the 2002 thriller Soul Survivors.

On television, Sagemiller portrayed the character Michelle Ernhardt in the TNT series Raising the Bar from 2008 to 2009. After that series was cancelled, Sagemiller joined Law & Order: Special Victims Unit in a recurring role as ADA Gillian Hardwicke. She replaced Paula Patton when Patton departed the series after just one episode. Sagemiller was featured in ten episodes of the 12th season of the series. She was replaced in the 13th season by Stephanie March and Diane Neal. In 2013, she was cast as a lead on Chicago Fire spinoff Chicago P.D., but left during pre-production.

Sagemiller is one of numerous actresses who have accused Harvey Weinstein of sexual assault and harassment.

== Personal life ==
Sagemiller became engaged in July 2006 to her Sleeper Cell co-star Alex Nesic after he proposed to her in the South of France. The couple have two children.

== Filmography ==
=== Film ===
Year	Title	Role	Notes
2001	Get Over It	Allison McAllister	
2001	Soul Survivors	Cassie	
2002	Sorority Boys	Leah	
2003	Love Object	Lisa Bellmer	Nominated — Chainsaw Award for Best Supporting Actress
2004	The Clearing	Jill Hayes	
2005	Standing Still	Samantha	
2005	Life on the Ledge	Claire	
2006	The Guardian	Emily Thomas	
2007	Mr. Woodcock	Tracy Detweiller	
2010	In Fidelity	Nicole / Pamela	Short film
2013	All I Want for Christmas	Elizabeth	Television film
2014	Santa Con	Carol Guthrie	

=== Television ===
Year	Title	Role	Notes
2000	Law & Order: Special Victims Unit	Becky Sorenson	Episode: "Russian Love Poem"
2005	Without a Trace	Carmen Kuskowski	Episode: "When Darkness Falls "
2005–2006	Sleeper Cell	Gayle Bishop	Series regular, 17 episodes
2009	Eleventh Hour	Sofia Lyons	Episode: "Medea"
2008–2009	Raising the Bar	Michelle Ernhardt	Series regular, 25 episodes
2010	The Rockford Files	Beth Davenport	TV pilot (un-aired)
2010–2011	Law & Order: Special Victims Unit	A.D.A. Gillian Hardwicke	Recurring role, 10 episodes
2013	Chicago Fire	Detective Julia Willhite	Episode: "Let Her Go"
2014	Chicago P.D.	Detective Julia Willhite	Episode: "Stepping Stone"
2014	Person of Interest	Sandra Nicholson	Episode: "Last Call"
