= Hot Sub =

- Miss Guided episode
- Episode no.: Season 1 Episode 2
- Directed by: Todd Holland
- Written by: Kevin Etten
- Production code: 1AMZ06
- Original air date: March 20, 2008

Episode chronology
← Previous "Homecoming"	Next → "The List"

“Hot Sub” is the second episode of the ABC situation comedy television series Miss Guided. It was written by Kevin Etten and directed by Todd Holland It aired March 20, 2008.

== Cast ==
=== Guest starring ===
- Ashton Kutcher - Beaux
- Jamie Lynn Spears - Mandy
- Scotch Ellis Loring - Mr. Shoemaker

=== Co-Starring ===
- Angel Laketa Moore - Staffer
- Robin Kreiger - Secretary
- Mikey Reid - Roger
- Travis Caldwell - Michael
- Maia Madison - the Female Janitor

== Episode Summary ==
A substitute teacher is drafted in to teach the Advanced Spanish class causing trouble for both Tim and Becky.

== Cultural references ==
- Beaux plays Becky Glory of Love by Peter Cetera to try to win her affections.
- Bruce tells Tim to "..make like Robin Williams and improvise" when he and Principal Huffy make a surprise evaluation of his Spanish lessons.
- Beaux also quotes from Good Will Hunting to convince Mandy not to attend College.
