= Travis Caldwell =

American actor

- Born: January 16, 1989 (age 37); Phoenix, Arizona
- Years active: 2006–present

Travis Caldwell (born January 16, 1989, in Phoenix, Arizona) is an American actor. He starred as Charlie Monohan on ABC's The Gates and has appeared on NBC's Parenthood and TeenNick's Gigantic.

== Career ==
Caldwell began his career appearing in an episode of Zoey 101 in 2006. That same year, he appeared in the short film Family Karma, along with Bruno Oliver, which was followed by two short films: The Tap in 2008 and The Juggler in 2009.

Between 2007 and 2008, Caldwell appeared as a guest star on TV series such as Women's Murder Club, Miss Guided, and the CBS series, Without a Trace.

In 2010, he appeared in the TeenNick series Gigantic and NBC's Parenthood, in addition to completing the film Hanna's Gold, with Luke Perry. In the same year, he was cast as Charlie Monohan, on the ABC supernatural series, The Gates, along with Frank Grillo, Rhona Mitra, Marisol Nichols, Luke Mably, Skyler Samuels, Colton Haynes and James Preston.

In 2011, Caldwell appeared in Wizards of Waverly Place and The Lying Game. He had a prominent role as Vinnie in the 2014 feature film Hello, My Name Is Frank, and another prominent role as Johnny in the 2015 film Stolen from Suburbia.

== Filmography ==
| Year | Title | Role | Notes |
|---|---|---|---|
| 2006 | Zoey 101 | Lance McCallister | TV series Episode: "Broadcast Views" |
| 2007 | Women's Murder Club | Pledge | TV series Episode: "To Drag & to Hold" |
| 2007 | Family Karma | Nathaniel | Short |
| 2008 | Miss Guided | Michael | TV series Episode: "Hot Sub" |
| 2008 | The Tap | Matt | Cortometraje |
| 2008 | Without a Trace | Rob | TV series Episode: "Better Angels" |
| 2009 | The Juggler | drunk freshman | Short |
| 2010 | Parenthood | Colin | TV series Episode: "Man Versus Possum" |
| 2010 | Hanna's Gold | Kevin Nelson | |
| 2010 | Gigantic | Eric | TV series Episode: "The Town of No" |
| 2010 | The Gates | Charlie Monohan | TV series Series Regular Role; 13 episodes |
| 2011 | Wizards of Waverly Place | Donny | TV series Episode: "Ghost Roommate" |
| 2011 | The Lying Game | Kelvin | TV series Episode: "Sex, Lies and Hard Knocks High" |
| 2012 | CSI: Miami | Andrew Kingman | TV series Episode: "At Risk" |
| 2013 | Playing Father | Nate Allen | TV movie |
| 2013 | The Neighbors | Zak | TV series 2 episodes: All That Jazzy Jeff; You've Lost That Larry Feeling |
| 2014 | Criminal Minds | Benton Farland | TV series Episode: "Amelia Porter" |
| 2014 | Hello, My Name Is Frank | Vinnie | Feature Film |
| 2015 | Stolen from Suburbia | Johnny | TV film |
| 2017 | Girl Followed | Nate | TV film |
| 2018 | NCIS: Los Ángeles | Dave | TV series Episode: "Reentry" |
| 2018 | No Good Deed | Eric | TV movie Post-production |
| 2019 | Wu Assassins | Gideon | TV series Recurring Role |
