= Meriam bint Abdullah Al Khalifa =

Bahraini royal of the House of Khalifa (born 1980)

- Born: 1980 (age 45–46); Manama, Bahrain
- Spouse: Jason Johnson (m. 1999; div. 2004)
- House: Khalifa
- Father: Abdullah bin Ibrahim Al-Khalifa
- Religion: Sunni Islam

Sheikha Meriam bint Abdullah Al Khalifa (Arabic: مريم بنت عبد الله آل خليفة; born 1980) is a member of the Bahraini royal House of Al-Khalifa. She is best known for fleeing her family and native Bahrain to the United States to elope with US Marine Lance Corporal Jason Johnson, who was, at the time, stationed in Bahrain as part of a counter-terrorism unit providing security for expatriate Americans. After she was smuggled into the United States with help from Lance Corporal Johnson and being threatened with deportation by United States Customs, she was permitted to stay and apply for asylum, claiming that she feared honor violence by her family in retaliation for fleeing her country and entertaining a romantic relationship with a non-Muslim. Her story was featured heavily in the American press, including The Oprah Winfrey Show, and was turned into a television movie.

== Background ==
Al Khalifa is one of five daughters of Shaikh Abdullah bin Ibrahim Al Khalifa a distant cousin of Bahrain's current king Hamad bin Isa Al Khalifa. Meriam is properly titled as "Shaikha", not "emira" or "princess".

In January 1999, she met Lance Corporal Jason Johnson, a United States Marine and a Mormon, at an "Americanized" shopping mall in Bahrain. They exchanged whispered phone calls and clandestine meetings until being spotted by a member of the Bahrain Royal Guard, who informed her mother of the illicit relationship. After being forced to end the relationship and forbidden to see Johnson, they continued their relationship by secretly exchanging letters through a jewelry store employee at the mall for eleven months, until Johnson's tour of duty was scheduled to end.

She and Johnson flew to the United States in November 1999 with Al Khalifa disguised as a female U.S. Marine and using fake military transfer documents, forged by Lance Corporal Johnson himself, and were married in a Las Vegas chapel on November 16, 1999, after which she settled into life as a military housewife, living in base housing at Camp Pendleton.

=== Application for asylum ===
For his role in helping Al Khalifa flee Bahrain, Johnson was court-martialed for "forging military papers," but because of all the media attention the case was getting, Johnson's punishment only consisted of him being stripped of his "Lance Corporal" rank, being demoted to "Private," the lowest rank in the United States Marine Corps. He was honorably discharged two months later.

Facing deportation from the United States, Al Khalifa applied for political asylum, citing that she faced harm, which, she claimed, could have included death, for her relationship and subsequent marriage to a non-Muslim, one who was not only a foreigner, but also an American, as well as for fleeing her native country illegally, without permission from her father or her government. In an interview with CBS News, Johnson and Al Khalifa said that if she returned to Bahrain, she would be "lashed, executed, stoned, killed, shot". Johnson also told the press that there was constant tension with her family, and the FBI told him that they had intercepted a Syrian national who claimed he had been paid $500,000 to assassinate her. Based on these fears, Al Khalifa was granted asylum in May 2001.

=== Media depictions ===
In 2001, a made-for-TV movie based on her relationship with Jason Johnson, their flight from Bahrain to the U.S., and their elopement, The Princess and the Marine, aired on NBC. It starred Mark-Paul Gosselaar as Johnson and Marisol Nichols as Meriam. The movie reportedly "caused one of the biggest bidding wars for packaged rights in the history of television movies," estimated at more than $500,000.

=== Return to visit Bahrain ===
In May 2001, the U.S. Immigration and Naturalization Service granted Al Khalifa Permanent Residency status, popularly known as a Green Card. She also resumed communication with her family in Bahrain.

Despite her earlier claims that she feared violence or death in her home country – an assertion that she had repeated in subsequent interviews – Al Khalifa returned to Bahrain in late 2001 to visit her family. She stated that she and her family were concerned about "violence aimed at people of Middle Eastern descent" after the September 11, 2001 terrorist attacks. She returned to Las Vegas at the end of year.

=== Divorce ===
The couple filed for divorce on November 17, 2004 (one day after their fifth wedding anniversary) in Las Vegas, Nevada, citing "incompatibility in marriage." According to Johnson, Al Khalifa had plunged heavily into the Las Vegas nightlife, subsequently leading to an estrangement. The couple had been considering divorce since 2001.

In 2005, Johnson appeared on an episode of Divorce Court, sans Meriam, to plead his case. The episode, numbered 1224, aired on January 31, 2005.
