= The Gates (TV series) =

- Genre: Crime drama; Mystery; Supernatural; Fantasy
- Created by: Richard Hatem; Grant Scharbo
- Starring: Rhona Mitra; Frank Grillo; Marisol Nichols; Luke Mably; Travis Caldwell; Skyler Samuels; Chandra West; Colton Haynes; Janina Gavankar; Justin Miles
- Composer: Robert Duncan
- Country of origin: United States
- Original language: English
- No. of seasons: 1
- No. of episodes: 13

Production
- Executive producers: Richard Hatem; Grant Scharbo; Gina Matthews
- Producers: Steve Miner; Dennis Stuart Murphy; Scott Nimerfro
- Cinematography: Arthur Albert; Philip Holahan
- Editors: Bill Johnson; Peter B. Ellis; Michael Stern
- Running time: 45 minutes
- Production companies: Little Engine Productions; Summerland Entertainment; Fox Television Studios

Original release
- Network: ABC
- Release: June 20 – September 19, 2010

The Gates is an American supernatural crime drama television series that aired on the ABC network from June 20, 2010, to September 19, 2010. The show was cancelled after its first season due to low ratings.

== Plot ==
Nick Monahan and his family move from Chicago to a serene, upscale community called The Gates, where he has a job as the new chief of police. They soon realise that the community is supernatural, consisting of mysterious neighbors who are not what they appear to be.

== Cast and characters ==
- Rhona Mitra as Claire Radcliff, a vampire
- Frank Grillo as Nick Monohan, the Gates’ new chief of police
- Marisol Nichols as Sarah Monohan, Nick's wife
- Luke Mably as Dylan Radcliff, a vampire and Claire's husband
- Travis Caldwell as Charlie Monohan, Nick & Sarah's son
- Skyler Samuels as Andie Bates, a succubus and both Charlie and Brett's love interest
- Chandra West as Devon Buckley, a witch.
- Colton Haynes as Brett Crezki, Andie's ex-boyfriend and a werewolf
- Janina Gavankar as Leigh Turner, a deputy officer alongside Marcus Jordan and Nick Monahan. Her species is unknown, presumed the "living dead" as her heart was ripped out by an ex-boyfriend.
- Justin Miles as Marcus Jordan, a deputy officer alongside Leigh Turner and Nick Monahan
- McKaley Miller as Dana Monohan, Nick & Sarah's daughter
- Victoria Platt as Dr. Peg Mueller, Devon's nemesis, as well as a witch
- James Preston as Lukas Ford, a werewolf and leader of his own small pack of teenage werewolves

== Development and production ==
In January 2009, The Gates was among numerous pilot scripts being considered by ABC for the 2009–2010 season. It was not until October 2009 that ABC first announced development of the series, which is an international co-production for Fox Television Studios through their international paradigm. A green-light for the 13 episode order was contingent on international financing for the project, which makes the series more economically feasible as a summer replacement.

Casting began in January 2010. In early February, casting announcements included Frank Grillo in a lead role, as well as Luke Mably, Janina Gavankar, and Chandra West having joined the cast. Late March 2010 castings included Marisol Nichols and Rhona Mitra in leading roles. Victoria Platt, Skyler Samuels and newcomer Justin Miles were also cast in the project. Paul Blackthorne will appear in a recurring role.

Filming began in Shreveport, Louisiana on March 29, 2010, and was expected to continue until August 2010. Original reports by Variety suggested that the series might be filmed overseas, with another outlet mentioning South America. The show has featured music by a variety of artists, including indie folk songwriter Quinn Marston.

=== Cancellation ===
Soon after the first season finished airing there were rumors that the show would not be returning for a second season. These rumors were further fueled by cast member Grillo's tweets suggesting that his contract was not going to be renewed. In October 2010 several of the show's stars confirmed that the show had indeed been canceled and that there would not be a second season.

== Episodes ==
No.	Title	Directed by	Written by	Original release date	Prod. code	U.S. viewers (millions)
1	"Pilot"	Terry McDonough	Richard Hatem & Grant Scharbo	June 20, 2010	5044–10–101	4.64
The lives of the Monohan family become unexpectedly complicated after moving into their new home in an exclusive community called "The Gates." In his new job as Chief of Police, Nick Monohan becomes involved in a missing person's case on his first day as he learns his neighbors are hiding their involvement in the case as well as a family secret. Just when his family is finally settling in, Nick receives bad news.
2	"What Lies Beneath"	David Barrett	Grant Scharbo	June 27, 2010	5044–10–102	3.19
Nick, disturbed by his discoveries about The Gates, investigates the death of his predecessor. Meanwhile, Claire deals with the backlash from her latest misdeed. Brett wants to keep dating Andie, but Andie must sort out her feelings for Charlie.
3	"Breach"	Terry McDonough	Richard Hatem	July 11, 2010	5044–10–103	3.25
A string of small crimes hits the Gates, starting with a robbery at the McAllister's house. Elsewhere, someone from Claire's past arrives and isn't buying her as a housewife. Lukas continues to pressure Brett to let loose with the rest of the pack.
4	"The Monster Within"	Paul A. Edwards	Gabrielle Stanton	July 18, 2010	5044–10–104	2.97
Brett and the pack receive some unwanted attention when a hunter goes missing. Nick and Dylan try to put their issues aside at the Father Daughter Dance. Andie and Charlie's relationship starts to blossom, but a surprise flip flops everything.
5	"Repercussions"	David Solomon	Scott Nimerfro	July 25, 2010	5044–10–105	2.89
Just as Nick comes to a dramatic realization that vampires exist, he's forced into a close association with one. But Nick and Dylan's secret is in jeopardy when Marcus looks into Teresa's disappearance. Trouble's in the air when Devon attends a party accompanied by her ex-husband and his new wife. Meanwhile, Charlie is determined to pursue Andie unmindful of the dangers that he may face.
6	"Jurisdiction"	David Grossman	Jared Romero	August 1, 2010	5044–10–106	2.83
Nick asks Dylan for help in finding the vampire who murdered a neighbor inside The Gates. Claire can't seem to end her "arrangement" with Christian. Meanwhile, extreme danger is in store for those around Andie when she tries to control her symptoms without her meds.
7	"Digging the Dirt"	Fred Gerber	Robert Hewitt Wolfe	August 8, 2010	5044–10–107	2.62
Nick and Dylan must find a secret about Frank Buckley to level the blackmail playing field. Social politics may ruin Sarah's pool party. Brett and Charlie continue to vie for Andie's affections. Devon has ulterior motives for trying internet dating.
8	"Dog Eat Dog"	David Barrett	Gabrielle Stanton	August 15, 2010	5044–10–108	2.59
Nick must act as referee between Vampires and Werewolves after Lukas' father is attacked and left for dead. In the middle of it all, Andie and Brett turn to each other. After being refused by Peg, Mia turns to Devon to learn witchcraft. Christian threatens to reveal his true relationship with Claire.
9	"Identity Crisis"	Steve Miner	Scott Nimerfro	August 22, 2010	5044–10–109	2.82
An FBI agent visits The Gates, searching for a criminal who may have taken refuge there. Andie grows weaker by the day, and Charlie has an unexpected crush. Claire and Dylan struggle to repair their bond.
10	"Little Girl Lost"	Steve Shill	Robert Hewitt Wolfe	September 5, 2010	5044–10–110	2.68
Dylan and Claire are asking Nick for help when Emily is kidnapped. Brett faces the realities of a relationship with Andie.
11	"Surfacing"	Holly Dale	Grant Scharbo	September 12, 2010	5044–10–111	2.09
Nick's past is haunting him, because of Devon's summoning. Claire is visited by Emily's Aunt Nancy and a social worker. Dana tries to bring Charlie and Andie back together.
12	"Bad Moon Rising"	Arthur Albert	Richard Hatem & Jared Romero	September 19, 2010	5044–10–112	2.78
A controversial decision threatens to tear the neighborhood apart. Sarah makes a discovery about Devon. Brett reacts to the news that Charlie and Andie are back together.
13	"Moving Day"	Fred Gerber	Grant Scharbo & Gabrielle Stanton	September 19, 2010	5044–10–113	2.84
Devastated by recent events, the Monohans decide to leave The Gates. The Radcliffes pursue Devon; Brett desperately searches for Andie.

== U.S. Nielsen ratings ==
Season	Originally Aired					
Season	Timeslot	Season premiere	Season finale	TV season	Rank	Viewers (in millions)
1	Sunday 10:00 pm	June 20, 2010	September 19, 2010	2010	—N/a	2.92

== See also ==
- List of vampire television series
- Werewolf fiction
