= Hello, My Name Is Frank =

- Film poster
- Directed by: Dale Peterson
- Written by: Dale Peterson; Margaret Kerrison; Christine Bartsch
- Story by: Dale Peterson
- Produced by: Wendy K. Peterson; Chris Pluchar
- Starring: Garrett M. Brown
- Cinematography: Tanner Wolfe
- Edited by: Ken Greenbaum
- Production company: Magic Ring Productions
- Distributed by: Vision Films
- Release date: 2014
- Running time: 105 minutes
- Country: United States
- Language: English

Hello, My Name Is Frank is a 2014 American comedy drama film written and directed by Dale Peterson and starring Garrett M. Brown and Rachel DiPillo. It follows the titular Frank, who is diagnosed with Tourette syndrome, along with Laura, the daughter of his live-in caretaker who recently died, and her friends Kim and Alisa as they go on a road trip to visit the grave of a friend, Stephanie, who they had promised, before she died, that they'd visit on her 18th birthday.

== Cast ==
- Garrett M. Brown as Frank Brown
- Rachel DiPillo as Laura
- Mary Kate Wiles as Kim
- Hayley Kiyoko as Alisa
- Travis Caldwell as Vinnie
- Kitty Swink as Louise
- Ray Xifo as Ray
- James DuMont as Dad in Park
- Nate Hartley as John
- Wayne Duvall as Preacher
- Brent Briscoe as Puggis
- Tess Harper as Aunt Flossie

== Accolades ==
At the Manhattan Film Festival, the film won the Best Dramatic Feature Award and Brown garnered the Best Actor Award.
