= Earl Billings =

American actor

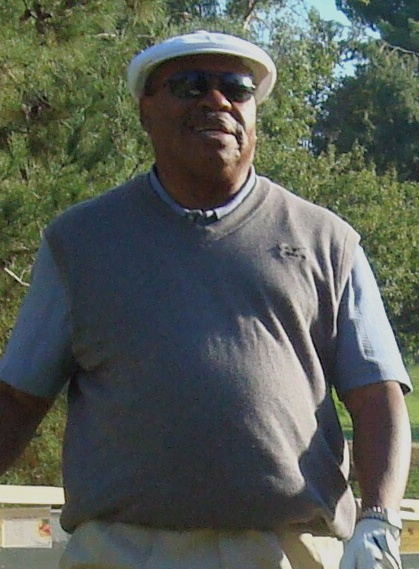
- Billings in September 2007
- Born: Earl William Billings; July 4, 1945 (age 80); Cleveland, Ohio, U.S.
- Occupation: Actor
- Years active: 1976–present
- Spouse: Denise Billings

Earl William Billings (born July 4, 1945) is an American actor, best known as Rob in the television series What's Happening!!.

== Life and career ==
Billings was born in Cleveland, Ohio, the son of Willie Mae Billings.

He has gained recognition for his participation in ads for Aflac. He has appeared in many television shows and films, such as Antwone Fisher (2002), American Splendor (2003), and Something New (2006). He starred in the short-lived ABC show Miss Guided, co-starring Judy Greer and Brooke Burns.

== Selected filmography ==
- Gosnell: The Trial of America's Biggest Serial Killer as Dr. Kermit Gosnell (2018)
- The Soul Man as Older Man (1 episode, 2015)
- Raising Hope as Photographer (1 episode, 2010)
- Parenthood as Pawn Shop Owner (1 episode, 2010)
- Cold Case as Eddie Clark '10 (1 episode, 2010)
- True Blood as Buster (1 episode, 2008)
- Miss Guided as Principal Phil Huffy (7 episodes, 2008)
- Senior Skip Day (2008) (V) as Lamar's Father
- Something New (2006) as Edmond McQueen
- How I Met Your Mother as Officer McNeil (1 episode, 2005 - "Sweet Taste of Liberty")
- Thank You for Smoking (2005) as Senator Dupree
- Rodney as Tom (1 episode, 2005)
- Fat Albert (2004) (voice) as Mr. Mudfoot
- Christmas at Water's Edge (2004) (TV) as Earl
- Without a Trace as Darrell Peters (1 episode, 2004)
- The King of Queens as Dennis (1 episode, 2004)
- Mr. 3000 (2004) as Lenny Koron
- ER (1 episode, 2003)
- American Splendor (2003) as Mr. Boats
- Antwone Fisher (2002) as Uncle James Elkins
- For Your Love as Milton (1 episode, 2002)
- The Guardian as Detective (1 episode, 2002)
- The Parkers as George West (3 episodes, 2000–2002)
- The Proud Family as Photographer/Papa Mack (2 episodes, 2001; 2004)
- Ally McBeal as Ray's Client (1 episodes, 2001)
- Titus as Earl the Bartender (1 episode, 2001)
- Moesha as Clayton (2 episodes, 1997; 1999)
- Becker as Mr. Kimsey (1 episode, 1999)
- The Hughleys as J.O. (1 episode, 1998)
- Smart Guy as Delroy Tibbs (1 episode, 1998)
- The Wayans Bros. as Rick (1 episode, 1998)
- The Steve Harvey Show as Reginald Steele (1 episode, 1998)
- The Practice as Judge Thomas Lawrence (1 episode, 1997)
- Mad About You as Security Guard (1 episode, 1997)
- Good News as Deacon Brooks (1 episode, 1997)
- Living in Peril (1997) as Detective
- Larger Than Life (1996) as Cop
- Crimson Tide (1995) as Chief Petty Officer Rick Marichek
- Touched by an Angel as Henry W. "Cueball" Seek (1 episode, 1995)
- South Central (TV) as Mayo Bonner (8 episodes, 1994)
- Walker, Texas Ranger as Lieutenant Levar Dixon (1 episode, 1994)
- Jimmy Hollywood (1994) as Police Captain
- The Sinbad Show as Car Salesman (1 episode, 1993)
- In the Shadows, Someone's Watching (1993) (TV movie) as Allston
- Where I Live as Zachary (1 episode, 1993)
- One False Move (1992) as John McFeely
- Home Improvement as Mike (2 episodes, 1992; 1995)
- Roc as Car Salesman (1 episode, 1992)
- Family Matters as Man (1 episode, 1991)
- In the Heat of the Night as Capt. Ralph Porter (1 episode, 1991)
- Married... with Children as Demerson (1 episode, 1991)
- Star Trek: The Next Generation as Adm. Thomas Henry (1 episode, 1991)
- Doctor Doctor as Carl Wilkes (1 episode, 1990)
- Frank's Place as Doctor (1 episode, 1987)
- Hill Street Blues as Wilson/Harv/Mr. Stephens (3 episodes, 1982; 1986)
- Bustin' Loose (1981) as Man in Parole Office
- The Jeffersons as Wendell Thomas (1 episode, 1981)
- What's Happening!! as Rob (8 episodes, 1977–1979)
- Good Times as Mr. Taylor/Mr. Parker (2 episodes, 1976–1977)
