= Kitty Swink =

American actress (born 1954)

- Born: Kathryn Swink; October 22, 1954 (age 71); Portland, Oregon, U.S.
- Occupation: Actress
- Years active: 1986–present
- Spouse: Armin Shimerman (m. 1981)

Kathryn Swink (born October 22, 1954) is an American film, stage, and television actress.

== Early life ==
Swink was born in Portland, Oregon in 1954, where her father, Don Swink, worked as an attorney.

== Career ==
Swink made her film debut in a minor role in the 1987 comedy Like Father Like Son, followed by a supporting part in Paul Schrader's biopic Patty Hearst (1988). She has worked primarily in television, including guest appearances on Star Trek: Deep Space Nine (1999), Judging Amy (2005), and Without a Trace (2006).

In addition to film and television, Swink has appeared in theater, including productions of Ladyhouse Blues in 2013 for the Andak Stage Company in Los Angeles, California.

== Personal life ==
Swink married actor Armin Shimerman in May 1981.

Swink survived breast cancer and in 2004, was diagnosed with late-stage pancreatic cancer after experiencing chronic back pain, unexplained weight loss, and jaundice. Seventeen days after her diagnosis, she underwent surgery to remove lymph nodes, half of her stomach, pancreas, gallbladder, and part of her intestines. She was given a 4% chance of surviving the next five years. Swink is involved in pancreatic cancer organizations to raise awareness and funds for patients with the disease.

== Filmography ==
=== Film ===
Year	Title	Role	Notes
1987	Like Father Like Son	Trigger's Mom	
1987	In the Mood	Betty	
1988	Patty Hearst	Gabi	
1988	Dance 'til Dawn	Caterer	Television film
1999	Pirates of Silicon Valley	Woman	Television film
2001	Breathing Hard	Literary Agent	
2001	Just Ask My Children	Lisa Short	Television film
2004	Wave Babes	Kitty	
2004	The Works	Madeline	
2007	Boxboarders!	Ginger James	
2011	The Selling	Betty	
2013	I Am I	Magda	
2014	Hello, My Name Is Frank	Louise	
2016	Diani & Devine Meet the Apocalypse	Myrna	
2016	Penumbra	Carol	

=== Television ===
Year	Title	Role	Notes
1986	Walt Disney's Wonderful World of Color	Minister's Wife	1 episode
1987	Comedy Factory	Verna	1 episode
1987	It's Garry Shandling's Show	Young Doctor #2	1 episode
1987	1st & Ten: The Championship	Stephanie Price	1 episode
1988	Something Is Out There	Paula	1 episode
1989	Designing Women	Sharon	1 episode
1990	Lifestories	June Weinberg	1 episode
1990	Over My Dead Body	Prosecutor	2 episodes
1994	The Young and the Restless	Travel Agent	1 episode
1995	Babylon 5	Senator	1 episode
1996	Dream On	Paramedic	1 episode
1996	Relativity	Edie Parker	1 episode
1997	Total Security	Mary	1 episode
1997	Beyond Belief: Fact or Fiction		1 episode
1998	Party of Five	Rita	1 episode
1999	Providence	Nurse	1 episode
1993, 1999	Star Trek: Deep Space Nine	Luaran / Minister Rozahn	2 episodes
1999	Chicago Hope	Diane Scholnick	1 episode
2001	Bull	Bebe	1 episode
2001	It's Like, You Know...	Woman	1 episode
2001	JAG	Janet Sauter	1 episode
2002	Becker	Helen Willakie	1 episode
2004	NYPD Blue	Doctor	1 episode
2004	Joan of Arcadia	Annette Langston	1 episode
1999–2005	Judging Amy	Principal Fisher / Ms. Halbrook	2 episodes
2006	Without a Trace	Ms. Evans	1 episode
2006	Monk	Dr. Bradley	1 episode
2006	South of Nowhere	Rhonda	2 episodes
2007	Crossing Jordan	Dr. Dupree	1 episode
2009	Leverage	Kerry Durham	1 episode
2009	Hawthorne	Dr. Cohen	1 episode
2010	Outlaw	Lawyer	1 episode
2011	Law & Order: LA	Judge Vera Benaski	1 episode
2011–2013	Fumbling Thru the Pieces	Stella Rose	7 episodes
2014	Nikki & Nora: The N&N Files	Dottie Reid	2 episodes
2016	The Fosters	Ellen	1 episode
2016	Red Bird	Mary	2 episodes
