= The Princess and the Marine =

2001 television film

- Written by: Ronni Kern
- Directed by: Mike Robe
- Starring: Marisol Nichols; Mark-Paul Gosselaar
- Country of origin: United States
- Original language: English

Production
- Producer: Preston Fischer
- Running time: 82 minutes
- Production companies: Aloe Entertainment; Columbia TriStar Television; Proud Mary Entertainment; Stephanie Germain Productions

Original release
- Network: NBC
- Release: February 18, 2001

The Princess and the Marine is a 2001 American made-for-television romantic drama film based on the true story of American Marine Jason Johnson and Bahraini Princess Meriam Al-Khalifa, with stars Mark-Paul Gosselaar and Marisol Nichols in the roles of Jason and Meriam.

== Plot ==
Meriam Al Khalifa is a Bahraini royal who is not content to be in an arranged marriage, even though her strict Muslim parents would never allow a union with a non-Muslim. Meriam is allowed to go to the local mall and watch and listen to American pop culture.

One day, Meriam desperately makes some random calls to strangers, including a Marine stationed at the U.S. embassy named Jason Johnson. After meeting, the two become friends and later fall in love, but Meriam doesn't tell anyone because of her parents. After being caught kissing at the Tree of Life, her mother forbids any more contact between the two. Meriam and Jason exchange letters with the help of a jeweler in the mall, and plan to run away to America with a fake passport for Meriam and pass her off as a fellow Marine.

Once in America, Meriam is taken in by the local authorities for being an illegal immigrant and is separated from Jason. Meriam is released after asking for asylum, saying she'd be disowned or even killed if she returned to Bahrain. Meriam and Jason marry in Las Vegas, and he is stripped of his insignia and rank to Private in the Marines.

The film concludes with Meriam and Jason stationed at a base, looking outside at an American flag, while a Marine holding a copy of the Quran salutes. It is then that Meriam tells Jason that this is what she believes in.

== Cast ==
- Mark-Paul Gosselaar as Jason Johnson
- Marisol Nichols as Meriam Al-Khalifa
- Luck Hari as Mrs. Al-Khalifa
- Alexis Lopes as Latifa
- Keith Robinson as Trucker
- Sheetal Sheth as Layla

== Award nominations ==
Marisol Nichols was nominated for ALMA Awards for Outstanding Actress for her role in this movie.

== See also ==
- Meriam Al Khalifa
- House of Khalifa
- Bahrain
- Tree of Life, Bahrain
