= Homecoming (Miss Guided) =

- Miss Guided episode
- Episode no.: Season 1 Episode 1
- Directed by: Todd Holland
- Written by: Caroline Williams
- Production code: 1AMZ79
- Original air date: March 18, 2008

Episode chronology
← Previous —	Next → "Hot Sub"

“Homecoming” is the pilot episode of the ABC television series Miss Guided. It was the series premiere of the show, and was written by Caroline Williams and directed by Todd Holland It aired March 18, 2008.

== Cast ==
=== Guest starring ===
- Tim Bagley as Peter
- Daryl Sabara as Russell
- Chad Broskey as Shane
- Chelsea Harris as Allison

=== Co-Starring ===
- Vanessa Marano as Kelly
- Juan Carlos Cantunatio as the Janitor
- Tom Choi as Ed the Wheelchair Man
- Jane Galloway Heitz as the Lunch Lady

== Episode summary ==
Bruce, the vice principal, is insulted that Becky, the guidance counselor, was made chair of the Homecoming dance. He tries to convince her to hire security, but she says she has chaperones, namely Tim, whom she loves. Shane, a student, comes to Becky for advice on asking a girl out for Homecoming, but she responds by breakdancing, and thinks he is talking about her. In the teacher's lounge, Tim, who was the Auto Shop teacher before he replaced the Spanish teacher, worries about being taken seriously as a teacher. While Becky is talking to Tim, Lisa introduces herself and embarrasses Becky. Lisa, an English teacher, was the most popular girl in Becky's graduating class and her rival. In Becky's office, the principal, who offered Becky her job because of her looks, asks her to be his date; Becky is saved by the arrival of a student.

The next morning, Tim drives into the staff parking lot. Becky follows him, offering to share lunch and discuss the dance. Though he agrees, Lisa drives into the lot, and Tim admires her car, which then breaks down. Bruce insists Becky use his security detail for the dance, and she relents. Tim bails on lunch to study for a parent teacher conference. Shane comes in and clarifies that he wants to ask out a senior, Allison, and adds that a friend asked Lisa out but found out Lisa was going with Tim. A flashback shows that in high school, Becky liked Lisa's boyfriend. Tim apologizes for missing lunch, and reveals that Lisa was the one who asked him out.

At the dance, Becky is dropped off by her mom, and she decides to spy on Lisa and Tim through the windows. Becky is offered a ride home by a girl with a similar outfit, but after seeing Lisa and Tim come out of the gym, hides behind a parked car. Lisa laughs at Becky's desperation, but Tim defends her.

== Cultural references ==
- Becky dances to the tune of Push It by Salt N Pepa.
- Becky and Ed the Wheelchair Man are the sole members of their Highschool Milli Vanilli club.

== Critical reception ==
The show received a 63 out of 100 on Metacritic, indicating "generally favorable reviews", with the most positive review from Entertainment Weekly saying "MG is wonderfully absurd and the supporting cast is satisfyingly straight-faced" [21 Mar 2008, p. 53] while the most negative review from Variety, which said "Beyond Greer's latter-day Mary Tyler Moore shtick, there's not a note or character that doesn't feel warmed over."

== Title reference ==
- The title of the episode references many series titles which have "Homecoming".
