= Laud Weiner =

- Directed by: Philip Euling
- Written by: Philip Euling
- Starring: David Hyde Pierce
- Release date: 2001

Laud Weiner is a short film written and directed by Philip Euling, starring David Hyde Pierce. The cast also includes Marisol Nichols, Jake Muxworthy, and James Oliver.

== Plot ==
The film follows Laud Weiner, an oblivious, self-satisfied, and spoiled Hollywood manager-producer, as he explains his 'hard' work to the camera while in reality taking credit for other people's ideas and making everyone's life difficult.

== Broadcast and DVD ==
The film was broadcast on the Independent Film Channel and is one of a number of short films featuring celebrities on the DVD short-film compilation "Celebrity Mix" put out by TLA Entertainment Group.

== Film Festivals ==
- Montreal World Film Festival 2002
- Edinburgh International Film Festival 2002
- Palm Springs International Festival of Short Films
- Philadelphia Film Festival 2002
- American Cinematheque 2002
- Canadian Film Centre's Worldwide Short Film Festival 2002
- Cinequest Film Festival 2003
- Hamptons International Film Festival 2002
- Newport Beach Film Festival 2002
- Rhode Island International Film Festival 2002
- Maui Film Festival 2003
- Cinema Society of San Diego 2003
- Port Townsend Film Festival, Washington 2002
- Silver Lake Film Festival 2002
- Sidewalk Moving Picture Festival 2002
- Great Lakes Independent Film Festival, Erie, PA 2002
- Wine Country Film Festival 2002
- Brooklyn International Film Festival 2002
- Los Angeles International Short Film Festival 2001

== Reaction ==
The film won Best Short Film at the Wine Country Film Festival in 2002.
