= Garrett M. Brown =

American actor (born 1948)

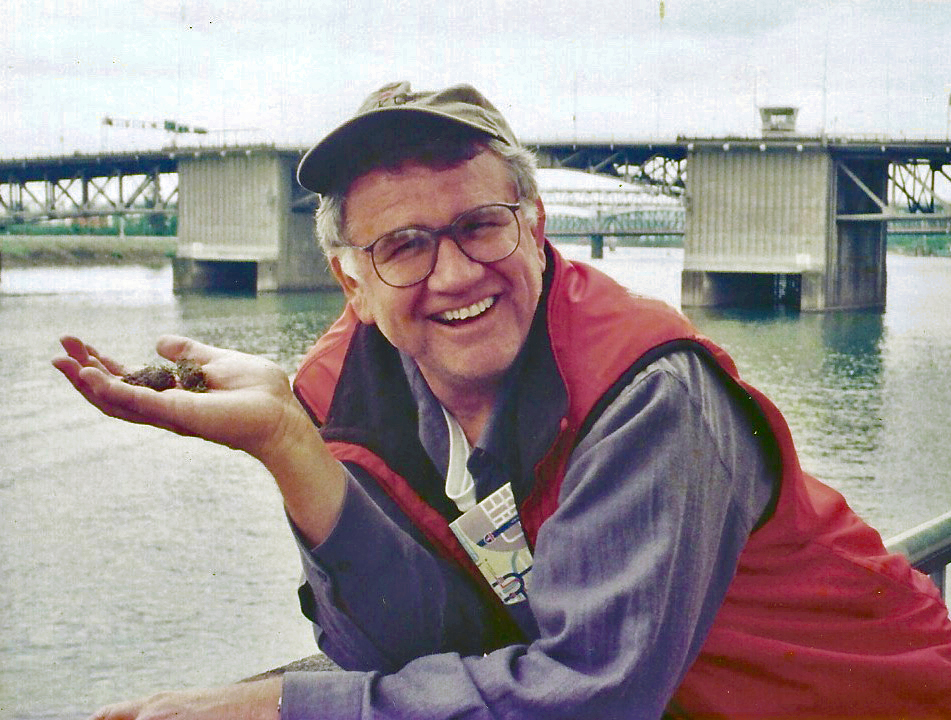
- Brown at Morrison Bridge in Portland, Oregon in 2018
- Born: November 7, 1948 (age 77); Michigan, U.S.
- Occupation: Actor
- Years active: 1979–present

Garrett M. Brown (born November 7, 1948) is an American character actor best known as John Whitsig in Sisters (1991–1996).

== Early life ==
Brown was born in Michigan but grew up in Connecticut. In 1972, he moved to New York City, where he worked as an orderly in a nursing home and as a waiter before starting acting classes.

== Career ==
He is known for portraying Bob Russell in Uncle Buck (1989) and James Lizewski in Kick-Ass (2010) and Kick-Ass 2 (2013). He also played the titular lead role in Hello, My Name Is Frank (2014), for which he won the Best Actor Award at the Manhattan Film Festival.

== Filmography ==
=== Film ===
Year	Title	Role	Notes
1983	Zelig	Actor Zelig	
1986	Lucas	Mr. Kaiser	
1989	Uncle Buck	Bob Russell	
1997	Turbulence	LAX Manager	
1997	Inventing the Abbotts	Webb Crosby	
1998	No More Baths	William McPhie	
1999	The Sky Is Falling	Mr. Williams	
2005	Fun with Dick and Jane	Ameribanx Bank Manager	
2006	Gridiron Gang	Coach Finley	
2006	Arc	Dr. Felder	
2007	Kiss the Bride	Gerald Golski	
2007	Tocatta & Fugue	Apothecary	
2009	The First Time	Uncle Paul	
2010	Kick-Ass	Mr. Lizewski	
2011	I Am Number Four	Mr. Simms	
2013	Behind the Candelabra	Joe Carracappa	
2013	Kick-Ass 2	Mr. Lizewski	
2014	Hello, My Name Is Frank	Frank Brown	
2015	Tag	Hal	
2021	Emily or Oscar	Awards show winner	

=== Television ===
Year	Title	Role	Notes
1979	The Dooley Brothers	George Dooley	Television film
1984	ABC Afterschool Special	John Henderson	Episode: "The Almost Royal Family"
1986	Apology	Gordon	Television film
1986–1987	What a Country!	Taylor Brown	26 episodes
1988	Jenny's Song	Bob Shields	Television film
1991–1996	Sisters	John Whitsig	100 episodes
1996	The Care and Handling of Roses	Roger Townsend	Television film
1996	NYPD Blue	Dick Manzak	Episode: "Caulksmanship"
1997	Grace Under Fire	Jerry Fleiss	2 episodes
1997	7th Heaven	Emory	Episode: "Do Something"
1997	Brooklyn South	Detective	Episode: "Dublin or Somethin"
1997, 2004	The Practice	Doug Forsythe / Walter Shepley	3 episodes
1999	Silk Stalkings	Senator Oron Pfeifer	Episode: "Strange Bedfellows"
1999	Can of Worms	Mike's Father	Television film
1999	Law & Order: SVU	Peter Ridley	Episode: "Hysteria"
2000	Chicago Hope	Harvey Sederberg	Episode: "Boys Will Be Girls"
2000	Pensacola: Wings of Gold	Hyram Scott	Episode: "At Poverty Level"
2000–2002	Roswell	Philip Evans	18 episodes
2001	Judging Amy	Mr. Johnson	Episode: "The Treachery of Compromise"
2001, 2013	CSI: Crime Scene Investigation	Dr. Martin Kinney / Mr. Rycoff	2 episodes
2002	Philly	Coach Harris	Episode: "Lies of Minelli"
2002	Strong Medicine	Karl	Episode: "Heartbeat"
2002	Boston Public	Father Bill Egan	2 episodes
2003	That '70s Show	Nina's Dad	Episode: "Bring It on Home"
2004	Cold Case	Roger	Episode: "The Boy in the Box"
2005	The Shield	Frank Walker	Episode: "Hurt"
2005	Supernova	Mr. Miller	Television film
2005	The O.C.	Dr. Kenneth Woodruff	2 episodes
2006	Courting Alex	Doug Melville	Episode: "Big Client"
2006	McBride: Requiem	Chief Watts	Television film
2007	Heartland	Hank Carlson	Episode: "The Places You'll Go"
2007–2009	Big Love	Bishop Devery	4 episodes
2009	Leverage	Dr. Frank	Episode: "The 12-Step Job"
2012	Criminal Minds	J.B. Allen	Episode: "Foundation"
2013–2015	Masters of Sex	Chancellor Fitzhugh	5 episodes
2015	Scandal	Vincent Ambruso	Episode: "Put a Ring on It"
2016	The People v. O. J. Simpson	Lou Brown	5 episodes
2019	NCIS	James Wallace	Episode: "Hail & Farewell"
2019	The InBetween	Abigail's Grandfather	Episode: "Pilot"
2021	Corona Town	Richard Camper	Episode: "Love ya, Bye"
2023–2024	Good Trouble	Murray	10 episodes
