= David Hyde Pierce =

American actor (born 1959)

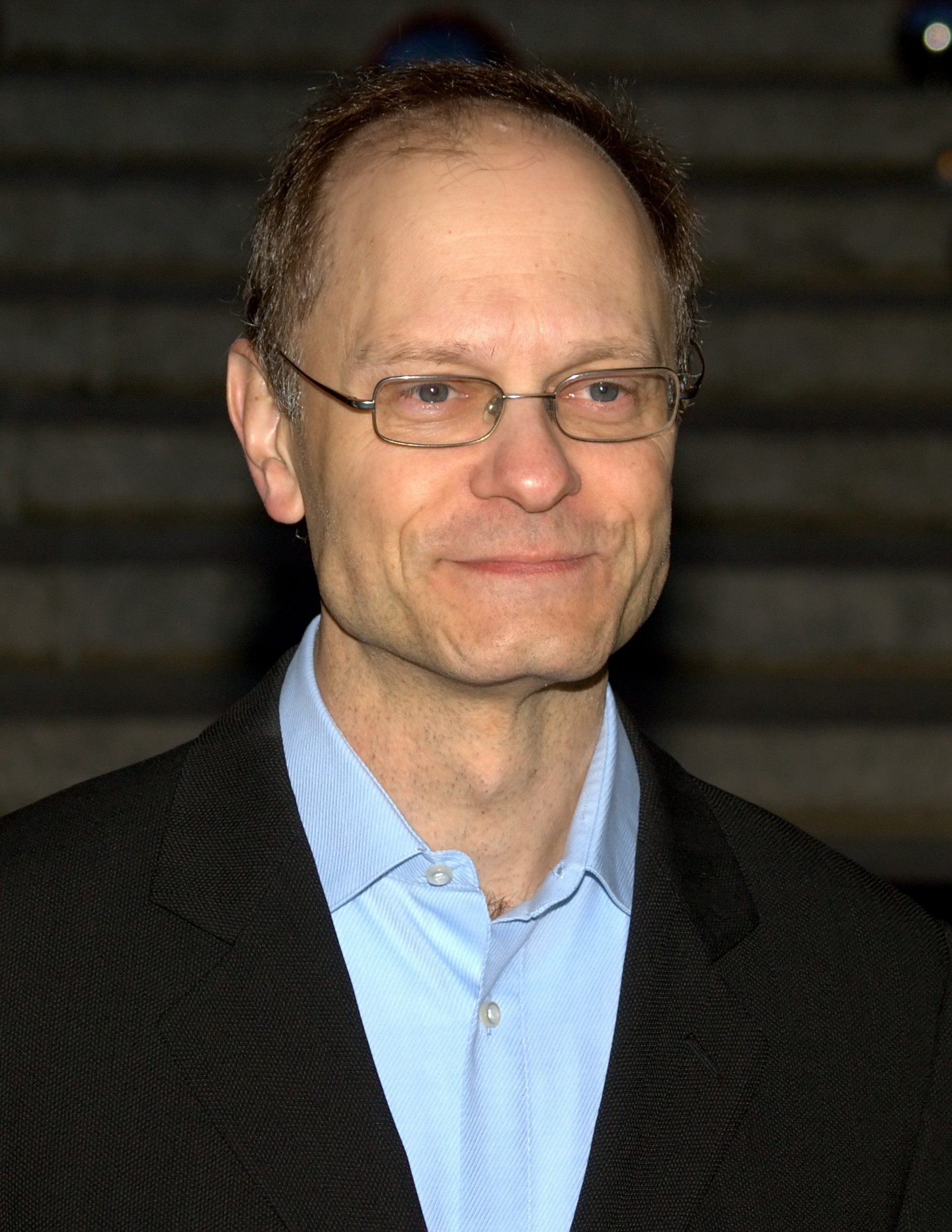
- Pierce in New York City in 2010
- Born: David Pierce; April 3, 1959 (age 67); Saratoga Springs, New York, U.S.
- Education: Yale University (BA)
- Occupation: Actor
- Years active: 1982–present
- Spouse: Brian Hargrove (m. 2008)

David Hyde Pierce (born David Pierce; April 3, 1959) is an American actor. Known for his portrayal of psychiatrist Niles Crane on the NBC sitcom Frasier from 1993 to 2004, he received four Primetime Emmy Awards for Outstanding Supporting Actor in a Comedy Series as well as two Screen Actors Guild Awards. Pierce has also received five Golden Globe Awards nominations for Best Supporting Actor for the role. He won the Tony Award for Best Actor in a Musical for his role of Lt. Frank Cioffi in the Broadway musical Curtains (2007).

Pierce acted in such films as Crossing Delancey (1988), The Fisher King (1991), Sleepless in Seattle (1993), Wolf (1994), Nixon (1995), Down with Love (2003), and The Perfect Host (2010). He voiced roles in Disney Pixar's A Bug's Life (1998), Osmosis Jones (2001), and Treasure Planet (2002). He portrayed Henry Newman in the comedy film Wet Hot American Summer and reprised his role in two series from Netflix in 2014 and in 2017. From 1992 to 1993, Pierce starred in the NBC sitcom The Powers That Be. He has since acted in the CBS legal drama The Good Wife (2014–2015), the ABC docu-drama When We Rise (2017), and the HBO Max series Julia (2022–23).

Besides his performance in Curtains, Pierce also had Broadway roles as Sir Robin in Monty Python's Spamalot (2005), Vanya in the comedic play Vanya and Sonia and Masha and Spike (2013) and Horace Vandergelder in the revival of Hello, Dolly! (2017). For the latter two, Pierce was nominated for a Tony Award. He made his Broadway directorial debut with the musical It Shoulda Been You (2015).

== Early life and education ==
David Hyde Pierce was born in Saratoga Springs, New York. His father, George Pierce, was an aspiring actor, and his mother, Laura Marie Pierce (née Hughes), was an insurance agent. He is the youngest of four children: he has two older sisters, Barbara and Nancy and one older brother, Thomas. He adopted the middle name Hyde in 1993 to avoid confusion with another actor named David Pierce. As a child, Pierce frequently played organ at the local Bethesda Episcopal Church. He attended Kabeyun, an all-boys' summer camp, where he acted in their camp productions of Gilbert & Sullivan and directed their production of H.M.S. Pinafore.

After graduating from Saratoga Springs High School in 1977, Pierce attended Yale University. He originally majored in music with an emphasis in piano performance, but later changed to a double major in English literature and theater studies. While attending Yale, Pierce performed in and directed student productions, appearing in the Yale Gilbert & Sullivan Society's production of H.M.S. Pinafore. Pierce also directed the Gilbert & Sullivan Society's operetta Princess Ida. Pierce graduated from Yale in 1981 with a Bachelor of Arts degree.

== Career ==
=== 1980–1992: Rise to prominence ===
After his college graduation, Pierce moved to New York City. During the 1980s and early 1990s, he was employed in various jobs (such as selling ties at Bloomingdale's and working as a security guard) while pursuing an acting career and studying at Michael Howard Studios. During this period, he played Laertes in an off-Broadway production of Hamlet, with Kevin Kline in the title role. Pierce made his Broadway debut in 1982 in Christopher Durang's Beyond Therapy. In 1988, Pierce played Yasha in Peter Brook's production of Chekhov's The Cherry Orchard at the Brooklyn Academy of Music in a cast that included Brian Dennehy, Linda Hunt, and Erland Josephson, Kate Mailer, and Jan Tříska.

Pierce's first big television break came in the early 1990s with Norman Lear's political comedy, The Powers That Be, in which Pierce played Theodore Van Horne, a Congressman. Despite positive reviews from critics, the show was canceled after a brief run. This did free Pierce up for his breakthrough role in Frasier, and the producers of that show did in part hire Pierce based on his performance in The Powers That Be.

=== 1993–2004: Breakthrough with Frasier ===
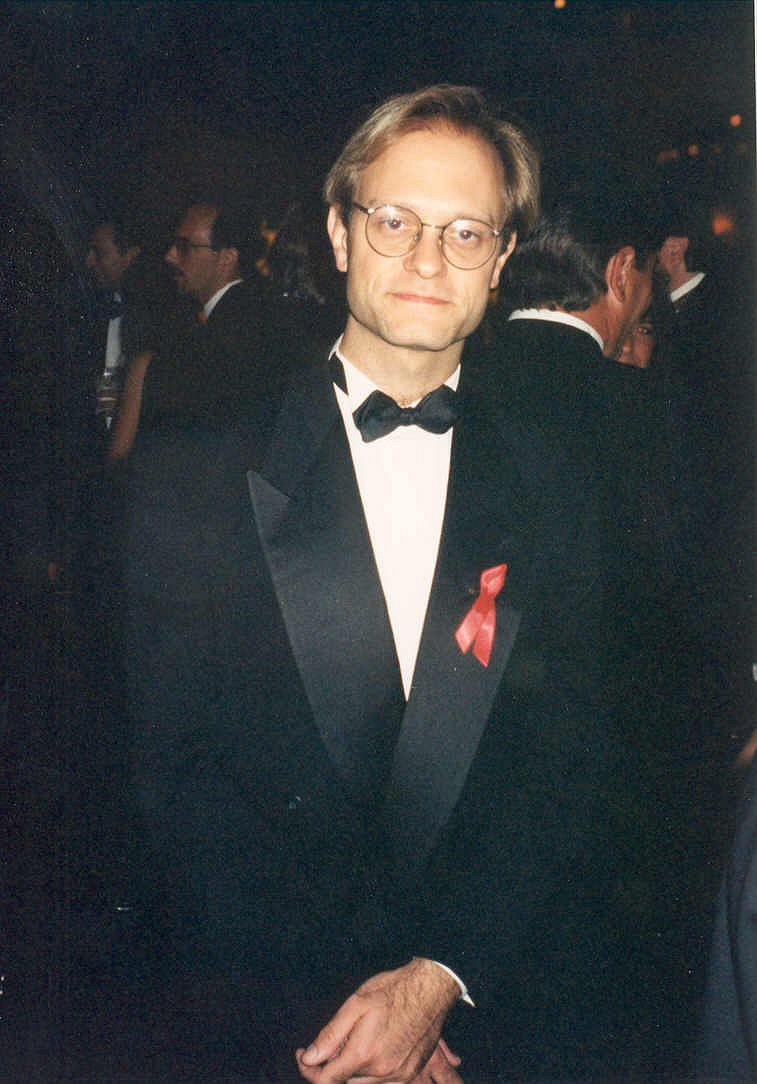
Pierce at the 1994 Emmy Awards

In part owing to his close facial resemblance to Kelsey Grammer, the producers of the Cheers spin-off Frasier created the role of Niles Crane (Frasier Crane's younger brother) for him. Prior to Frasier going into production, Pierce had petitioned the Screen Actors Guild to change his billing to David Pierce–the name he had used on the stage–concerned that the use of his middle name in the show's credits would typecast him, saddling him with the character's "snooty" image. For his work on Frasier, Pierce was nominated for a Best Supporting Actor Emmy a record eleven consecutive years, winning in 1995, 1998, 1999 and 2004. Pierce received praise for his skilled physical comedy and rapid fire comedy reactions. David Bianculli of New York Daily News declared, "Not since Jack Benny has TV seen such a great reactive comedian as Pierce, and whenever he and [Kelsey] Grammer share the same stage, Frasier is undiluted magic.

Pierce also appeared alongside Jodie Foster in Little Man Tate, with Anthony Hopkins in Oliver Stone's Nixon (1995), and with Ewan McGregor in Down With Love (2003). He provided the voice for Doctor Doppler in Disney's 42nd animated feature, Treasure Planet; Slim, a stick insect in Pixar's A Bug's Life; and Abe Sapien in Guillermo del Toro's Hellboy. In his role in Sleepless in Seattle (1993), Pierce played Dennis Reed, the brother of Meg Ryan's character Annie Reed, a professor at Johns Hopkins University. The film was released three months before the start of Frasier. In 2001, he starred in the cult 1981-set summer camp comedy Wet Hot American Summer, as the befuddled astrophysicist Prof. Henry Newman.

Pierce has played a number of roles as a voice actor. These include the narrator of the film The Mating Habits of the Earthbound Human in 1999, the walking stick insect "Slim" in A Bug's Life, Dr. Delbert Doppler in Disney's film Treasure Planet, and amphibian Abe Sapien in Hellboy. Pierce declined to be credited for his Hellboy role because he felt it was the performance of Doug Jones, and not his own voice, which ultimately brought the character of Abe Sapien to life. He was the voice for Drix, a cold pill, in the animated comedy Osmosis Jones.

In a deliberate in-joke, he voiced Cecil Terwilliger, the brother of Kelsey Grammer-voiced Sideshow Bob, in The Simpsons' eighth season episode "Brother from Another Series", in which the two characters parallel the Frasier–Niles relationship. At one point in the episode, Cecil mistakes Bart Simpson (voiced by Nancy Cartwright) for Maris Crane, the unseen wife of Niles on Frasier. He returned as Cecil in the Season 19 episode "Funeral for a Fiend" where Frasier co-star John Mahoney voices Dr. Robert Terwilliger Sr., the father of Cecil and Sideshow Bob.

Pierce provided the voice of Mr. Daedalus in the 1998 Disney show Hercules: The Animated Series. Pierce narrated an audio tour guide, Napa Uncorked, in 2002. In 2006, he co-starred in the animated pilot for The Amazing Screw-On Head as the Screw-On Head (Paul Giamatti)'s nemesis Emperor Zombie; however, the series was not picked up. His commercial voiceover work included ads for the Tassimo coffee system, Seattle's Metro Transit, and home furnishings retailer IKEA Canada.

=== 2005–2016: Return to Broadway ===
In 2005, Pierce joined Tim Curry and others in the stage production of Spamalot. In August and September 2006, he starred as Lieutenant Frank Cioffi in Curtains, a new Kander and Ebb musical staged at the Ahmanson Theatre in Los Angeles. In March 2007, Curtains opened on Broadway and on June 10, 2007, Pierce won the Tony Award for Best Actor in a Musical for his performance. In his acceptance speech, Pierce said the first words he spoke on a Broadway stage were, "I'm sorry, I'm going to have to ask you to leave."

On November 19, 2007, Pierce was awarded an honorary Doctor of Fine Arts degree from Niagara University in Lewiston, New York. In 1999, he was awarded an honorary degree from Skidmore College, located in his native Saratoga Springs. Pierce was nominated for a Grammy Award for Best Spoken Word Album for Children at the 52nd Annual Grammy Awards in 2010 for his narration of The Phantom Tollbooth.

In 2010, Pierce appeared in a revival of David Hirson's play La Bête directed by Matthew Warchus. The production debuted on London's West End before moving to New York. Also in 2010, Pierce had his first starring film role as Warwick Wilson in the dark comedy/psychological thriller The Perfect Host. From 2014 to 2015, Pierce appeared in The Good Wife as Frank Prady on CBS. He also starred as Assoc. Prof. Henry Neumann in Wet Hot American Summer: First Day of Camp (2015) on Netflix. Pierce directed the Broadway production of the musical It Shoulda Been You. In 2015, he directed the Manhattan Theater Club production of David Lindsay-Abaire's play Ripcord Off-Broadway at City Center. Pierce appeared in the Off-Broadway limited engagement of A Life by Adam Bock. The play premiered at the Peter Jay Sharp Theater on October 24, 2016, directed by Anne Kauffman, and closed on November 27.

=== 2017–present ===
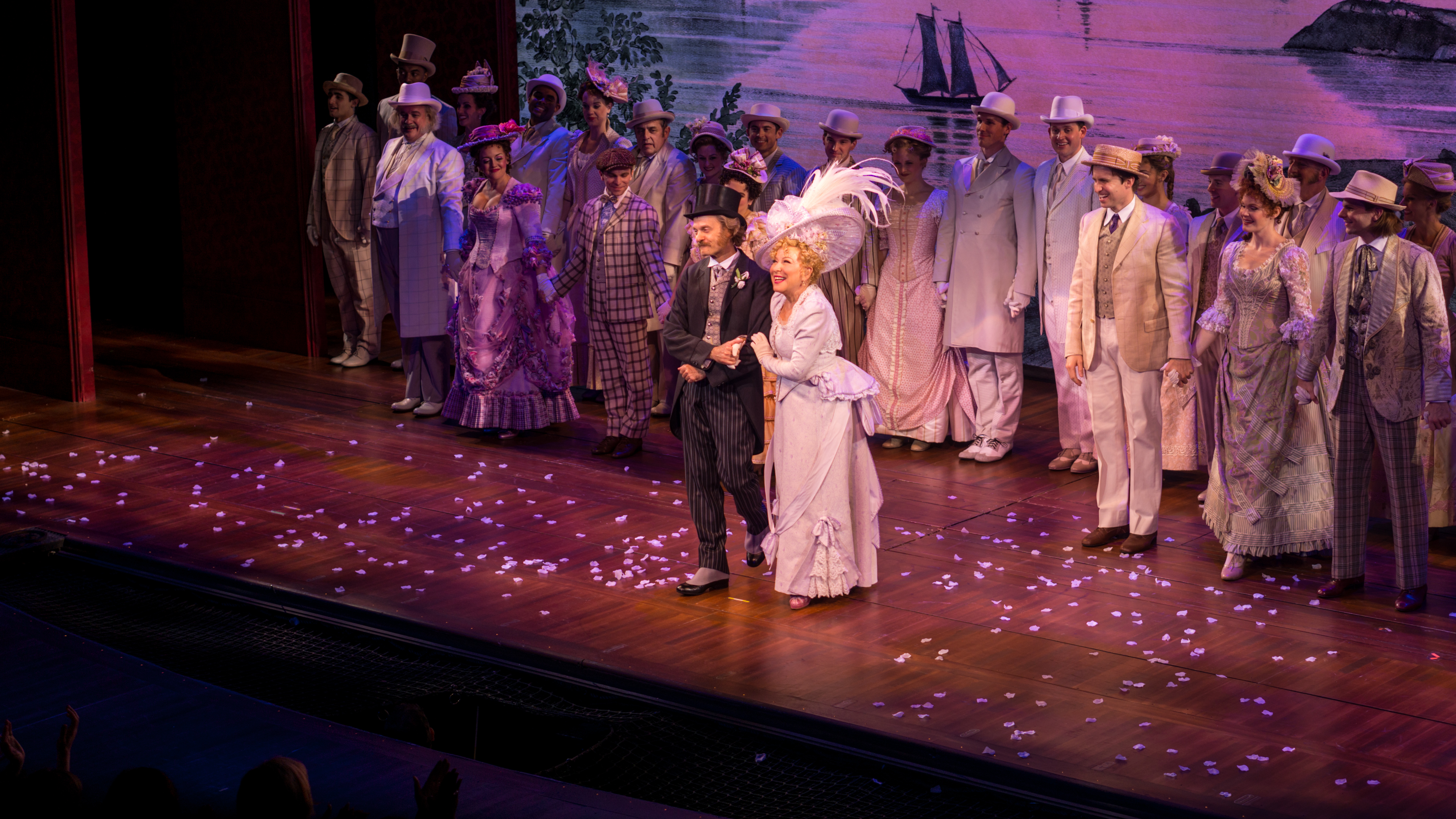
Pierce with Bette Midler at Hello, Dolly! on Broadway in 2017

In 2017, he returned to television in the limited docudrama series about LGBT rights, When We Rise, as Dr. Jones. He also appeared as himself with Julie Andrews in Julie's Greenroom on Netflix. Pierce co-starred with Bette Midler in the Broadway revival of Hello, Dolly!. The musical opened on April 20, 2017, at the Shubert Theatre. The show was a critical and box office hit. Pierce received a Tony Award nomination for Best Actor in a Musical for his performance at the 71st Tony Awards, as well as Drama League Award nominations for Hello, Dolly! and A Life.

In 2020, Pierce replaced Tom Hollander as Paul Cushing Child in the biographical series Julia which premiered on HBO Max in March 2022. The cast includes Sarah Lancashire, Bebe Neuwirth, and Isabella Rossellini. In October 2021 he starred as Walter Vale in the musical The Visitor at The Public Theater. The project is based on the 2007 film of the same name written by Tom McCarthy. In late 2022, it was revealed that Pierce had declined to return as Niles Crane in the 2023 revival of Frasier, saying he didn't think there was much left for Niles to do.

Pierce starred in the final musical from Stephen Sondheim entitled Here We Are (2023) which was performed at The Shed in New York City. Pierce acted alongside Bobby Cannavale, Amber Gray, Rachel Bay Jones, Denis O'Hare, and Steven Pasquale. The production involves a book by David Ives and was directed by Joe Mantello. It is based on the Luis Buñuel films The Discreet Charm of the Bourgeoisie (1972) and The Exterminating Angel (1962).

In 2024, it was announced that Pierce would star as the Major General and W. S. Gilbert in the Roundabout Theatre Company's revival of Gilbert and Sullivan's The Pirates of Penzance titled Pirates! The Penzance Musical starting in April 2025, opposite Ramin Karimloo as the Pirate King. The revival was a reimagining set in New Orleans, "sizzling with Caribbean rhythms and French Quarter flair."

Pierce will star in and co-produce a new show on NBC. Macro Pennette will pen the pilot. News of this new show was announced in September 2026.

== Personal life ==
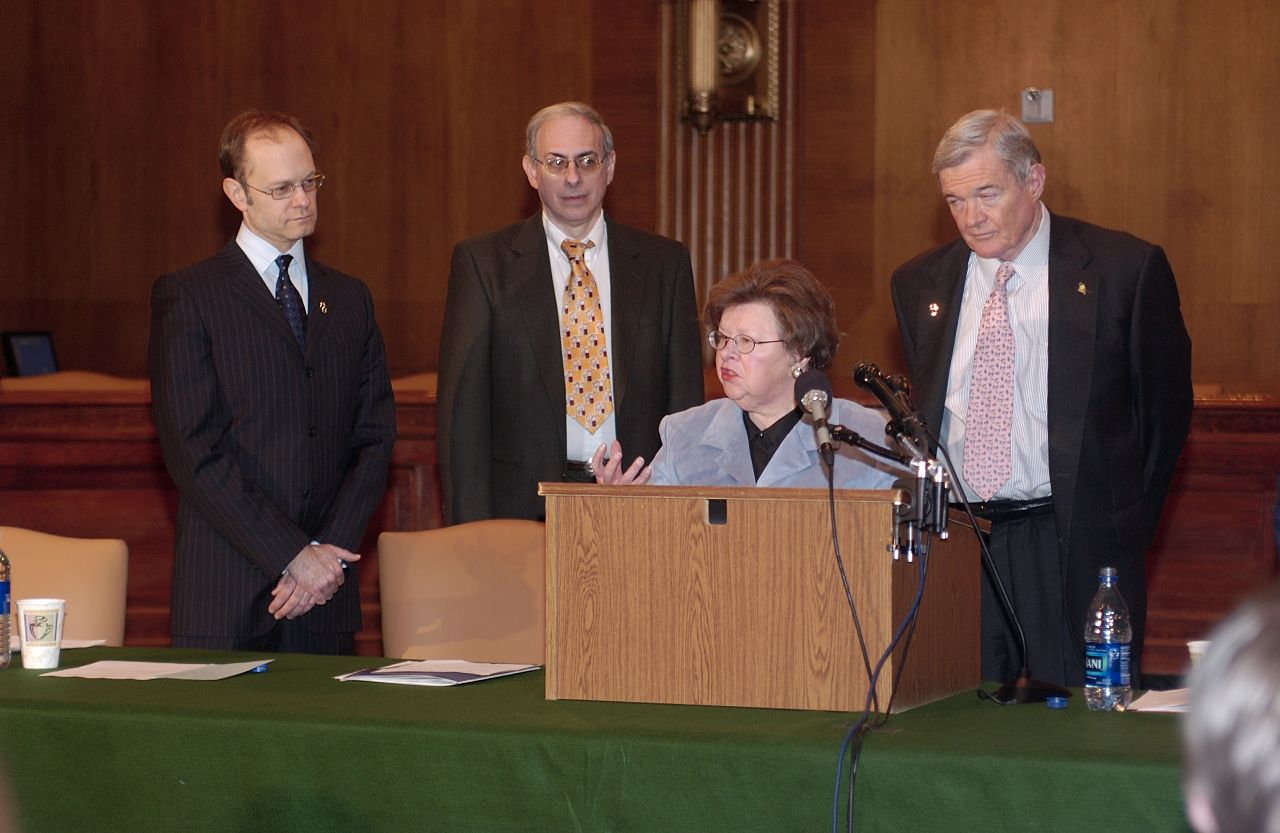
Maryland Senator Barbara Mikulski, Missouri Senator Kit Bond and Pierce at the Alzheimer's Press Conference to promote awareness

After years of media speculation about his sexuality, Pierce revealed in 2007 that he is gay and later confirmed through his publicist that he and television writer, director, and producer Brian Hargrove were a couple. When accepting his Tony Award for Curtains, Pierce thanked "my partner, Brian, because it's 24 years of listening to your damn notes—that's why I'm up here tonight." They married in California on October 24, 2008, just days before Proposition 8 was adopted as law banning same-sex marriages in the state. On May 28, 2009, while a guest on The View, he publicly announced his marriage to Hargrove and expressed his anger about the approval of Proposition 8.

Pierce has spent years working with the Alzheimer's Association on behalf of Americans with Alzheimer's disease. He has appeared in Washington, D.C., to testify in support of expanding funding for treatment, and he publicly campaigned for the National Alzheimer's Project Act. Pierce told MSNBC in 2011, "it is up to us, to all of us, to the American people and to their representatives about whether we face the challenges and make all the effort necessary or if we ignore it and just let this sort of tidal wave crash over us."

== Filmography ==
=== Film ===
Year	Title	Role	Notes
1988	The Appointments of Dennis Jennings	Businessman	Short film
1988	Bright Lights, Big City	Bartender at Fashion Show	
1988	Crossing Delancey	Mark	
1988	Rocket Gibraltar	Monsieur Henri	
1989	Vampire's Kiss	Theater Guy	
1990	Across Five Aprils	Union Soldier	
1991	Little Man Tate	Garth Emmerick	
1991	The Fisher King	Lou Rosen	
1993	Sleepless in Seattle	Dennis Reed	
1993	Addams Family Values	Delivery Room Doctor	
1994	Wolf	Roy MacAllister	
1995	Ripple	Peter	Short film
1995	Nixon	John Dean	
1998	A Bug's Life	Slim (voice)	
1999	The Mating Habits of the Earthbound Human	Narrator	
2000	Isn't She Great	Michael Hastings	
2000	Chain of Fools	Mr. Kerner	
2000	The Tangerine Bear	Bird (voice)	
2001	Wet Hot American Summer	Henry Newman	
2001	Happy Birthday	Barney	Short film
2001	Osmosis Jones	Special Agent "Drix" Drixobenzometaphedramine (voice)	
2001	Laud Weiner	Laud Weiner	Short film
2002	Full Frontal	Carl	
2002	Treasure Planet	Delbert Doppler (voice)	
2003	Down with Love	Peter MacMannus	
2004	Hellboy	Abe Sapien (voice)	Uncredited
2008	Forever Plaid: The Movie	Narrator	
2009	Stingray Sam	Narrator	
2010	The Perfect Host	Warwick Wilson	
2024	The Exorcism	Father Conor	
2026	Mouse	Mr. Murdaugh	
TBA	Vivien & the Florist	John Gielgud	Post-production

=== Television ===
Year	Title	Role	Notes
1987	Spenser: For Hire	O'Neill	Episode: "The Man Who Wasn't There"
1987	Crime Story	NSA Agent Carruthers	Episode: "Mig 21"
1988	Knightwatch	Gibson	Episode: "Friday Knight"
1992	Dream On	Jerry Dorfer	Episode: "The Guilty Party"
1992–1993	The Powers That Be	Theodore Van Horne	Main role (21 episodes)
1993–2004	Frasier	Dr. Niles Crane	Main role (264 episodes)
1995	Saturday Night Live	Himself (host)	Episode: "David Hyde Pierce/Live"
1995	The Adventures of Hyperman	Buttons (voice)	Episode: "Emma Is History/Appalling 13"
1995	Caroline in the City	Dr. Niles Crane	Episode: "Caroline and the Bad Back"
1996	The Outer Limits	Dr. Jack Henson	Episode: "The Sentence"
1996	Mighty Ducks	Baron von Lichtenstamp (voice)	3 episodes
1996	Caroline in the City	Jimmy Callahan	Episode: "Caroline and the Cat Dancer"
1997	Happily Every After: Fairly Tales for Every Child	Puss (voice)	Episode: "Puss in Boots"
1997, 2007, 2014	The Simpsons	Cecil Terwilliger, Himself (voice)	3 episodes
1999	Jackie's Back	Perry	Television film
2001	Titus	Jerry October	Episode: "Life Forward"
2001	On the Edge	Barney	Television film
2003	Gary the Rat	Addison (voice)	Episode: "Strange Bedfellows"
2006	The Amazing Screw-On Head	Emperor Zombie (voice)	Television film
2010	Sondheim! The Birthday Concert	Himself (host)	Television special
2012	Sesame Street	Commander Chiphead	Episode: "Get Lost, Mr. Chips"
2014–2015	The Good Wife	Frank Prady	8 episodes
2015	Wet Hot American Summer: First Day of Camp	Henry Newman	2 episodes
2017	Wet Hot American Summer: Ten Years Later	Henry Newman	Episode: "End Summer Night's Dream"
2017	When We Rise	Dr. Jones	3 episodes
2017	Julie's Greenroom	Himself	2 episodes
2022–2023	Julia	Paul Child / Charles Child	Main role (16 episodes)

=== Theatre ===
Year	Title	Role	Notes	Ref.
1982	Beyond Therapy	Andrew	Brooks Atkinson Theatre, Broadway	
1986	Hamlet	Laertes	Newman Theatre, The Public Theater	
1988	Much Ado About Nothing	Don John	Delacorte Theater, The Public Theater	
1990	The Heidi Chronicles	Peter Patrone	Plymouth Theatre, Broadway	
2001	Six Dance Lessons in Six Weeks	Michael Minetti	Geffen Playhouse, Los Angeles	
2004–2005	Spamalot	Sir Robin and others	Shubert Theatre, Chicago	
2005–2006	Spamalot	Sir Robin and others	Shubert Theatre, Broadway	
2005	A Wonderful Life	Clarence Odbody	Shubert Theatre; Concert	
2006	Curtains	Lieutenant Frank Cioffi	Ahmanson Theatre, Los Angeles	
2007–2008	Curtains	Lieutenant Frank Cioffi	Al Hirschfeld Theatre, Broadway	
2009	Accent on Youth	Steven Gaye	Samuel J. Friedman Theatre, Broadway	
2010	La Bête	Elomire	Comedy Theatre, West End	
2010–2011	La Bête	Elomire	Music Box Theatre, Broadway	
2013	Vanya and Sonia and Masha and Spike	Vanya	John Golden Theatre, Broadway	
2015	It Shoulda Been You	—N/a	Director	
2015	Ripcord	—N/a	Director	
2016	A Life	Nate Martin	Peter Jay Sharp Theatre, Off-Broadway	
2017–2018	Hello, Dolly!	Horace Vandergelder	Shubert Theatre, Broadway	
2021	The Visitor	Walter Vale	Newman Theatre, The Public Theater	
2022	The Pirates of Penzance	Major General Stanley	American Airlines Theatre; Stage reading	
2023	Gutenberg! The Musical!	The Producer (one night cameo)	James Earl Jones Theatre, Broadway	
2023–2024	Here We Are	Bishop	The Shed, Off-Broadway	
2025	Pirates! The Penzance Musical	Major General Stanley / W. S. Gilbert	Todd Haimes Theatre, Broadway	
2026	Oklahoma!	Andrew Carnes	Carnegie Hall	
2027	You're a Good Man, Charlie Brown	Charlie Brown	New York City Center Encores!	

=== Video games ===
Year	Title	Role	Notes
1998	A Bug's Life	Slim	

== Awards and nominations ==
Organizations	Year	Category	Nominated work	Result	Ref.
Tony Awards	2007	Best Actor in a Musical	Curtains	Won	
Tony Awards	2010	Isabelle Stevenson Award		Won	
Tony Awards	2013	Best Actor in a Play	Vanya and Sonia and Masha and Spike	Nominated	
Tony Awards	2017	Best Actor in a Musical	Hello, Dolly!	Nominated	
Primetime Emmy Award	1994	Supporting Actor in a Comedy Series	Frasier	Nominated	
Primetime Emmy Award	1995	Supporting Actor in a Comedy Series	Frasier	Won	
Primetime Emmy Award	1996	Supporting Actor in a Comedy Series	Frasier	Nominated	
Primetime Emmy Award	1997	Supporting Actor in a Comedy Series	Frasier	Nominated	
Primetime Emmy Award	1998	Supporting Actor in a Comedy Series	Frasier	Won	
Primetime Emmy Award	1999	Supporting Actor in a Comedy Series	Frasier	Won	
Primetime Emmy Award	2000	Supporting Actor in a Comedy Series	Frasier	Nominated	
Primetime Emmy Award	2001	Supporting Actor in a Comedy Series	Frasier	Nominated	
Primetime Emmy Award	2002	Supporting Actor in a Comedy Series	Frasier	Nominated	
Primetime Emmy Award	2003	Supporting Actor in a Comedy Series	Frasier	Nominated	
Primetime Emmy Award	2004	Supporting Actor in a Comedy Series	Frasier	Won	
Golden Globe Award	1994	Best Supporting Actor – Television Series	Frasier	Nominated	
Golden Globe Award	1995	Best Supporting Actor – Television Series	Frasier	Nominated	
Golden Globe Award	1996	Best Supporting Actor – Television Series	Frasier	Nominated	
Golden Globe Award	1997	Best Supporting Actor – Television Series	Frasier	Nominated	
Golden Globe Award	2000	Best Supporting Actor – Television Series	Frasier	Nominated	
Screen Actors Guild Award	1994	Outstanding Ensemble in a Comedy Series	Frasier	Nominated	
Screen Actors Guild Award	1994	Outstanding Male Actor in a Comedy Series	Frasier	Nominated	
Screen Actors Guild Award	1995	Outstanding Cast in a Motion Picture	Nixon	Nominated	
Screen Actors Guild Award	1995	Outstanding Ensemble in a Comedy Series	Frasier	Nominated	
Screen Actors Guild Award	1995	Outstanding Male Actor in a Comedy Series	Frasier	Won	
Screen Actors Guild Award	1996	Outstanding Ensemble in a Comedy Series	Frasier	Nominated	
Screen Actors Guild Award	1996	Outstanding Male Actor in a Comedy Series	Frasier	Nominated	
Screen Actors Guild Award	1997	Outstanding Ensemble in a Comedy Series	Frasier	Nominated	
Screen Actors Guild Award	1997	Outstanding Male Actor in a Comedy Series	Frasier	Nominated	
Screen Actors Guild Award	1998	Outstanding Ensemble in a Comedy Series	Frasier	Nominated	
Screen Actors Guild Award	1998	Outstanding Male Actor in a Comedy Series	Frasier	Nominated	
Screen Actors Guild Award	1999	Outstanding Ensemble in a Comedy Series	Frasier	Won	
Screen Actors Guild Award	1999	Outstanding Male Actor in a Comedy Series	Frasier	Nominated	
Screen Actors Guild Award	2000	Outstanding Ensemble in a Comedy Series	Frasier	Nominated	
Screen Actors Guild Award	2000	Outstanding Male Actor in a Comedy Series	Frasier	Nominated	
Screen Actors Guild Award	2001	Outstanding Ensemble in a Comedy Series	Frasier	Nominated	
Screen Actors Guild Award	2001	Outstanding Male Actor in a Comedy Series	Frasier	Nominated	
Screen Actors Guild Award	2002	Outstanding Ensemble in a Comedy Series	Frasier	Nominated	
Screen Actors Guild Award	2003	Outstanding Ensemble in a Comedy Series	Frasier	Nominated	
