= Miss Guided =

- Genre: Sitcom
- Created by: Caroline Williams
- Starring: Judy Greer; Brooke Burns; Earl Billings; Kristoffer Polaha; Chris Parnell
- Composer: Jeff Cardoni
- Country of origin: United States
- Original language: English
- No. of seasons: 1
- No. of episodes: 7

Production
- Executive producers: Todd Holland; Karey Burke; Jason Goldberg; Mark Hudis; Ashton Kutcher
- Camera setup: Single-camera
- Running time: 30 minutes
- Production companies: Katalyst Media; ABC Studios; 20th Century Fox Television

Original release
- Network: ABC
- Release: March 18 – April 3, 2008

Miss Guided is an American sitcom that ran from March 18, 2008, to April 3, 2008, as a mid-season replacement on ABC. The series follows the life of Becky Freeley, a guidance counselor at a high school that she attended when she was a teenager. The pilot was directed by Todd Holland. The series was not renewed for a second season as ABC canceled the series after one season.

== Cast and characters ==
- Judy Greer – Rebecca "Becky" Freeley, Guidance Counselor at Glen Ellen High School. She previously attended the school as a student, and was in the same graduating class as Lisa. She was unpopular in High School, her sole activity being one of only two members of the Milli Vanilli club. She does not have much of a social life, and still lives with her mom. She has a crush on Tim.
- Earl Billings – Phil Huffy, Principal of the school. He hired Becky mainly because she is a lot prettier than he remembers her in High School. He has an apathetic attitude toward his work.
- Brooke Burns – Lisa Germain, English teacher and cheerleading coach. Lisa is a new addition to the school but like Becky she also attended the school as a student, graduating in the same class as Becky and being crowned Homecoming Queen and was a cheerleader. She was married to a man called Jay, but they are currently separated. She is also the target of Vice Principal Bruce Terry's affections but she has no feelings whatsoever for him, while she is seen as Becky's rival for the affections of fellow teacher Tim O'Malley.
- Kristoffer Polaha – Tim O'Malley, Remedial Spanish teacher. Previously taught Auto-Shop at the school, before a vacancy led him to move to the Spanish department despite having only basic knowledge of the language. He is noted for having good hair and being the object of both Becky and Lisa's affections. Is two credits short of holding a College Diploma, but no one else at the school knows.
- Chris Parnell – Bruce Terry, Vice Principal of the school. Has been at the school for at least 11 years, teaching both Becky and Lisa in their school days. He likes to think of himself as an authoritative masculine figure, although it is hinted that he has tendencies that might lead people to believe that he is gay. He has already set his sights on going after both the Principal's job and Lisa, who wants nothing to do with him. The episode "Frenemies" showed that he greatly admires Vice President Dick Cheney.

The show has featured a number of guest stars, most notably Executive Producer Ashton Kutcher guest starred in the second episode as substitute teacher Beaux alongside Zoey 101 star Jamie Lynn Spears as a student, and Rumer Willis as a rebellious student.

== Episodes ==
No.	Title	Directed by	Written by	Original release date	Prod. code
1	"Homecoming"	Todd Holland	Caroline Williams	March 18, 2008	1AMZ79
Becky Freeley returns to her alma mater as a guidance counselor after having finally conquered the awkward, traumatic world of high school. Now that Becky might finally get the upper hand in life and love, she is shocked to discover that the newly hired English teacher is none other than her high school nemesis, Lisa Germain. The newly singled Lisa is a smart, stunning beauty and, suddenly, Becky is forced to relive her past and compete for the love of her life's affection, Spanish teacher Tim (Polaha).
2	"Hot Sub"	Todd Holland	Kevin Etten	March 20, 2008	1AMZ06
Becky is over the moon when a hot Spanish substitute teacher (guest starring Ashton Kutcher as Beaux), chooses her over Lisa, but has second thoughts when his presence threatens Tim's job. Meanwhile, one of Becky's troubled students (guest starring Jamie Lynn Spears as Mandy Ferner), gets exciting news from college, but considers throwing it all away based on the radical teachings of Beaux (Kutcher), who convinces the impressionable teens that everything you really need to learn in life you can't learn from college.
3	"The List"	Todd Holland	Matt Murray	March 20, 2008	1AMZ01
A student's gossip blog creates drama for the entire school. After Becky realizes that she is at the bottom of the "do-able" teachers list, she feigns disinterest, but secretly sets out to improve her ranking.
4	"Rebel Yell"	Michael Lehmann	Barbie Adler	March 27, 2008	1AMZ04
In an effort to fit in with the cool kids at school, Tim and Lisa, Becky makes an attempt to rebel for the first time in her life by vandalizing Bruce's office, but her efforts are thwarted when Bruce swears her to silence about her deeds for his own gain.
5	"Pool Party"	Michael Lehmann	Caroline Williams	March 27, 2008	1AMZ02
Becky finds herself in charge of planning a 40th anniversary party for the oldest and most hated teacher in school history. When Becky's pushed to her limit, her good intentions backfire and she unleashes 15 years of anger on Mrs. Pool resulting in Mrs. Pool's untimely death. Meanwhile Tim and Bruce realize that they have something in common; compromising relationships with Mrs. Pool.
6	"High School Musical"	Todd Holland	David Walpert	April 3, 2008	1AMZ03
A shortsighted Bruce assigns Becky, who is the least creative faculty member on campus, to direct the school's high school musical.
7	"Frenemies"	Jason Winer	Shawn Simmons	April 3, 2008	1AMZ05
Unaware that Becky has eyes for Tim, Lisa confides in Becky that her divorce is final and seeks her advice about dating. Meanwhile, Becky intervenes in an unconventional manner when Bruce gives a rebellious student six months' detention for pulling the fire alarm.

== Production ==
Caroline Williams penned the script for the show, originally called Miss/Guided, which was then developed by Katalyst Films, Ashton Kutcher's Studio at 20th Century Fox Television. The ABC network then ordered the pilot to be made in August 2006.

After the pilot was shot ABC ordered the show to series on May 13, 2007, ordering an additional six episodes two days before its formal upfront presentation for the fall television season. At the upfronts the show wasn't given any formal timeslot, instead being held by the network for a mid-season debut. The show completed all of its original 7 episode order prior to the 2007–2008 Writers Guild of America strike. Prior to its first airing the shows title was changed to Miss Guided, losing the '/' from its original title.

=== Casting ===
In October 2006, Judy Greer was cast in the lead role of Becky. This was soon followed by Brooke Burns as Lisa, Kristoffer Polaha as Tim, Earl Billings as Principal Huffy and Jonathan Sadowski as Gary, the school's male nurse.

Following the changes to the show runners, Chris Parnell was cast as a regular in the show as Bruce, originally planned to be a rival Guidance Counselor to Becky. The character was then changed to the Vice Principal of the school, while Jonathan Sadowski was let go from his role of Gary.

=== Crew ===
Gabrielle Allen (Scrubs) was hired as the original show runner with Todd Holland committed to direct the pilot. Kutcher, Jason Goldberg and Karey Burke would serve as the shows executive producers alongside Holland and Allen. Creator Caroline Williams would serve as Co-Executive Producer.

In June 2007, Gabrielle Allen left her production role and Rob Thomas was announced as the new Show Runner of the series but left the show after only a few weeks due to creative differences over the show's tone. He was replaced by Mark Hudis, who previously worked as the show runner on That '70s Show. Hudis is credited as Executive Producer from the second episode onward.

Crew members included:

- Kevin Etten
- Mark Hudis
- Victor Hsu
- Karey Burke
- Todd Holland
- Ashton Kutcher
- Caroline Williams
- Barbara Feldman
- Jason Goldberg
- David Walpert
- Joel Goldberg
- Gabrielle Allan

== Broadcasting ==
The show debuted Tuesday March 18, 2008 at 10:30PM EST following an extended Dancing With the Stars. The show subsequently moved to its regular time slot of Thursday 8PM EST on March 20, 2008, where back to back episodes air for the whole hour.

== Reception ==
=== Critical response ===
The show received a 63 out of 100 on Metacritic, indicating "generally favorable reviews", with the most positive review coming from Entertainment Weekly saying "MG is wonderfully absurd and the supporting cast is satisfyingly straight-faced" [21 Mar 2008, p. 53] while the most negative review from Variety said "Beyond Greer's latter-day Mary Tyler Moore shtick, there's not a note or character that doesn't feel warmed over."

=== U.S. Nielsen ratings ===
Weekly ratings
#	Episode	Air Date	Timeslot	Rating	Share	18–49 (Rating/Share)	Viewers (m)	Rank (Timeslot)	Rank (Night)	Rank (Overall)
1	"Homecoming"	March 18, 2008	10:35 P.M.	6.7	12	2.9/8	9.93	1	5	21
2	"Hot Sub"	March 20, 2008	8:00 P.M.	4.2	8	2.1/7	6.28	4	9	49
3	"The List"	March 20, 2008	8:30 P.M.	4.3	7	2.3/7	6.31	4	9	47
4	"Rebel Yell"	March 27, 2008	8:00 P.M.	4.0	7	2.0/6	5.90	4	7	59
5	"Pool Party"	March 27, 2008	8:30 P.M.	3.8	6	2.1/6	5.58	4	8	65
6	"High School Musical"	April 3, 2008	8:00 P.M.	3.2	5	1.5/5	4.60	4	N/A	70
7	"Frenemies"	April 3, 2008	8:30 P.M.	3.0	5	1.6/4	4.34	4	N/A	74
