= Marisol Nichols =

American actress (born 1973)

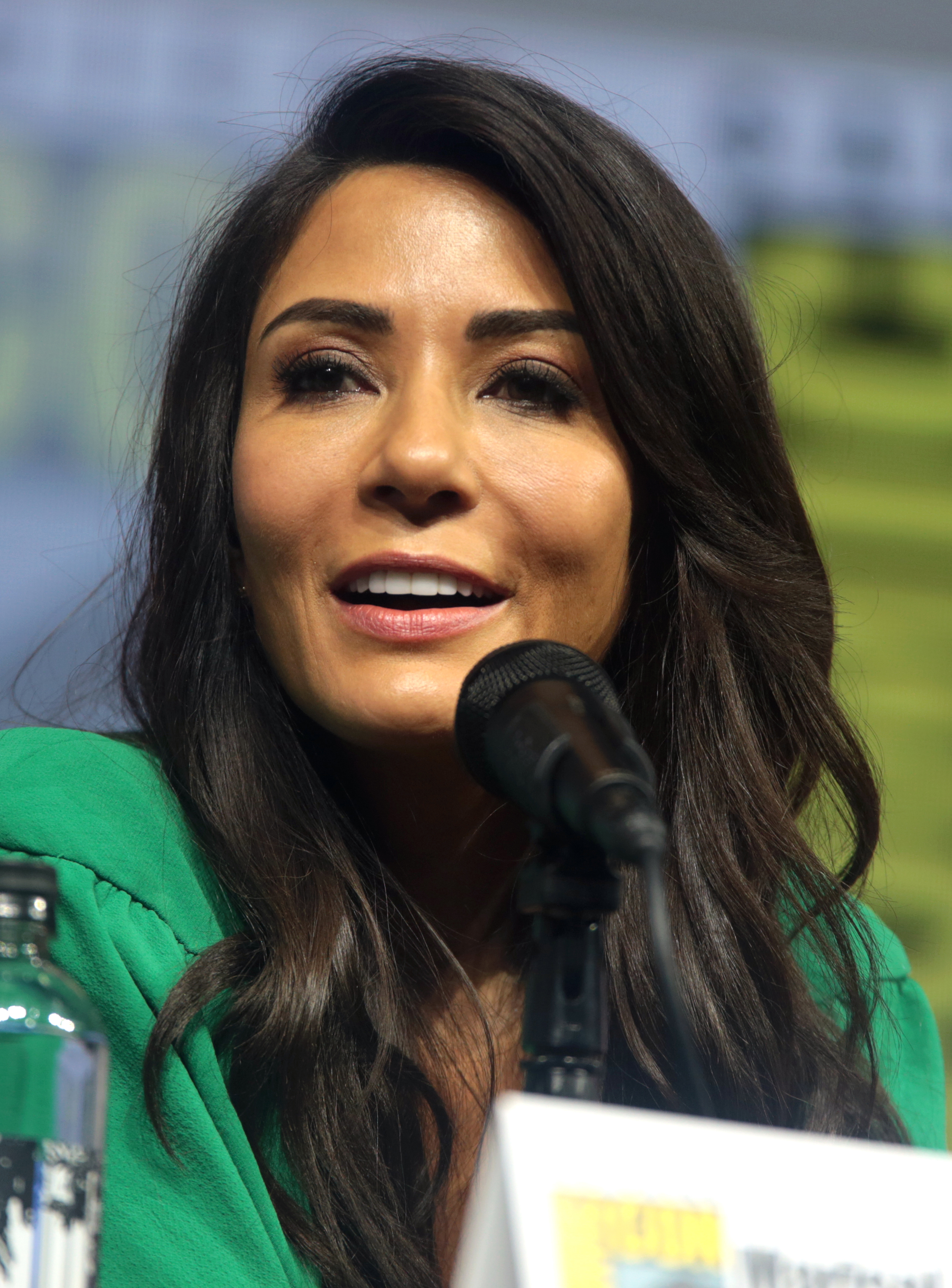
- Nichols in 2018
- Born: November 2, 1973 (age 53); Chicago, Illinois, U.S.
- Occupation: Actress
- Years active: 1996–present
- Spouses: Andrea Sorrentino (m. 1999, divorced) Taron Lexton (m. 2008)
- Children: 1
- Website: www.marisolnichols.com

Marisol Nichols (born November 2, 1973) is an American actress, known for her roles as Principal Ramirez on the Nickelodeon animated series The Loud House, Nadia Yassir on the Fox series 24, and Hermione Lodge on the CW drama series Riverdale.

== Early life ==
Nichols was born in the Rogers Park neighborhood of Chicago, Illinois, and grew up in Naperville, Illinois, with her mother, who is of Mexican descent, and her stepfather, Randy. Her biological father was of Russian-Jewish and Hungarian-Jewish descent. She is the oldest of three siblings, having two younger brothers.

== Career ==
In 1996, she appeared in episodes of Due South and Beverly Hills, 90210. In 1997, she made her movie debut as Audrey Griswold in the film Vegas Vacation with Chevy Chase and Beverly D'Angelo. She also had supporting roles in the films Scream 2, Friends 'Til the End, Can't Hardly Wait, Jane Austen's Mafia and The Sex Monster.

From 2000 to 2002, she starred in the Showtime drama series Resurrection Blvd.. In 2001, she played Bahraini Princess (Sheika) Meriam Al Khalifa in the made-for-TV movie The Princess and the Marine. In 2003, she made guest appearances on episodes of Friends, CSI: Crime Scene Investigation, Law & Order: Special Victims Unit, Nip/Tuck and Charmed. Marisol's Charmed episode, "Chris-Crossed", was the show's highest-rated non-season-premiere episode. In 2006, she appeared in six episodes of Cold Case and starred in the film Big Momma's House 2.

She starred in the short-lived TV series Blind Justice in 2005 and In Justice, in 2006. In 2007, she starred in 24 as Special Agent Nadia Yassir. In 2008, she starred in the film Felon with Stephen Dorff.

In 2010, Nichols portrayed Sarah Monahan in the short-lived supernatural crime drama The Gates, a summer series on ABC. She also had a cameo in Kristin Chenoweth's music video for "I Want Somebody (Bitch About)". Nichols also portrayed "The Desert Wolf" on MTV's show Teen Wolf.

Nichols has appeared in both NCIS and NCIS: Los Angeles (as different characters). She starred in NCIS: Los Angeles in 2010, as Tracy Keller, former partner and potential romantic interest for Special Agent G. Callen (Chris O'Donnell) in the sixth episode of Season 2. In NCIS, she appeared as ATF Special Agent Zoe Keats, the girlfriend of Tony DiNozzo (Michael Weatherly) for several episodes of season 12.

In 2012, Nichols starred in the ABC TV series GCB, with Leslie Bibb, Kristin Chenoweth, Annie Potts, Jennifer Aspen and Miriam Shor.

In 2016, Nichols began starring as Hermione Lodge, the mother of Veronica Lodge, in the teen drama series Riverdale, loosely based on the Archie comic book series. On February 23, 2020, Nichols rumored that she would be leaving Riverdale ahead of its fifth season, making season four her last on the show. However, in June 2020, Nichols revealed that after having a talk with showrunner Roberto Aguirre-Sacasa, she would be staying on for season five.

On the Nickelodeon animated television series The Loud House, Nichols recurs as the voice of Principal Ramirez.

In 2026, Marisol Nichols will star in the Lifetime film She Stole My Son's Heart portraying a detective who alongside her rookie partner goes to look for a missing woman and retrieve her before her heart gives out.

== Personal life ==
In November 1999, Nichols married Andrea Sorrentino, whom she met in Italy while filming the movie My Father's Shoes. They later divorced. In April 2008, she married director Taron Lexton. They have a daughter, born in September 2008. In November 2018, Nichols filed for divorce.

Nichols resides in Los Angeles, California.

In the 1990s, Nichols became a Scientologist, having been introduced to it by her chiropractor.

In 2026, Marisol Nichols signed up with Brave Artist Management.

=== Volunteer work and activism ===
In an interview with Marie Claire, Nichols said that she was raped when she was eleven, and that it "changed the entire trajectory of my life in a day." This inspired her to start a non-profit organization called Foundation for a Slavery Free World and has regularly spoken publicly about sex trafficking and ways to prevent children from becoming trafficked victims.

In 2012, as her career slowed down, Nichols began working with former FBI and CIA agents, Navy SEALs and Green Berets, as well as local law enforcement who have left government agencies and gone independent to help trap child sex predators. Her role involved acting as "bait", playing whatever role the situation called for, such as pretending to be a parent who was pimping out a child. In partnership with nonprofit organization Operation Underground Railroad, Nichols' work took her across the United States and other countries globally, including Haiti and Venezuela.

== Filmography ==
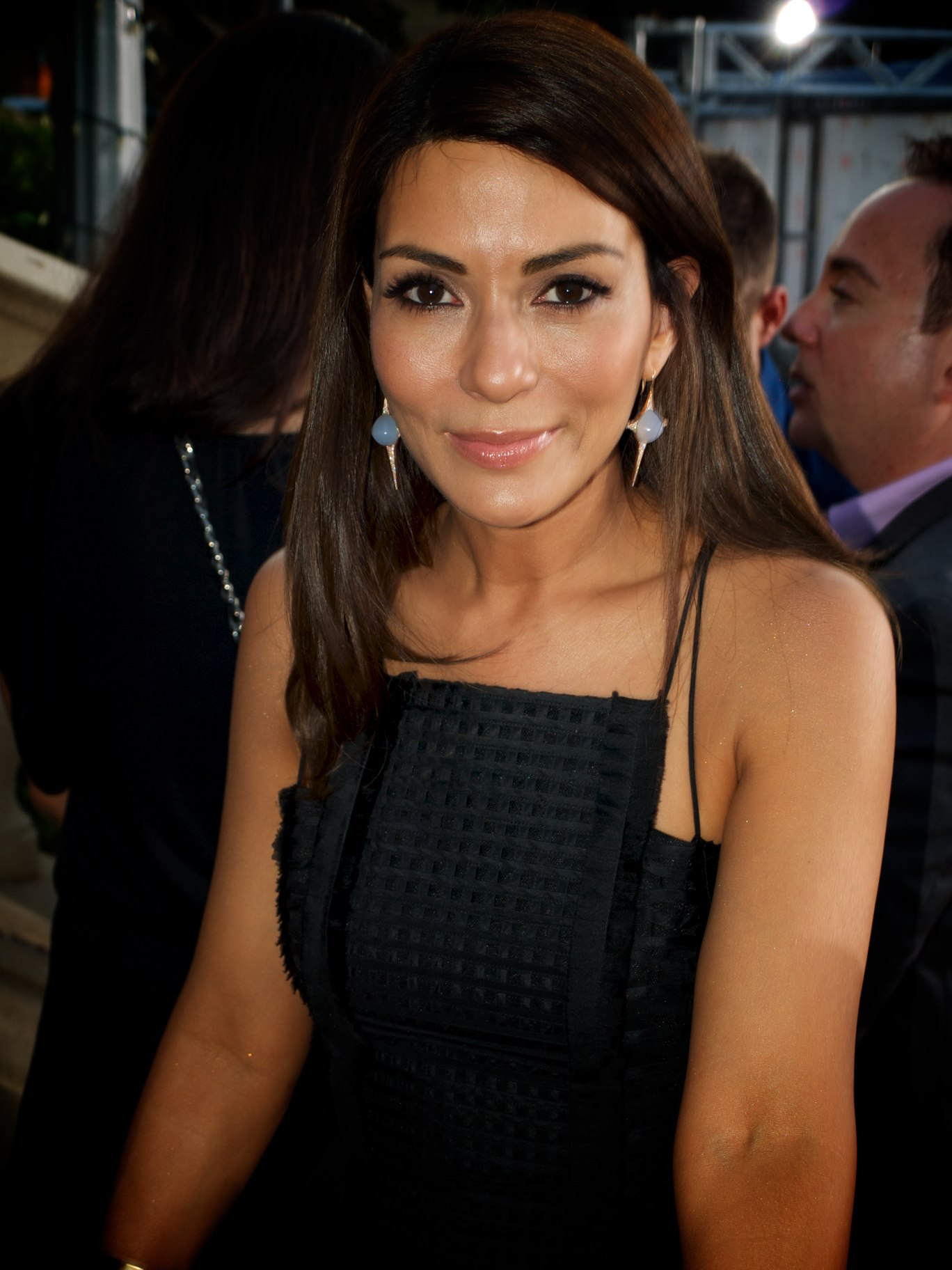
Nichols at the 2012 Alma Awards

=== Film ===
Year	Title	Role	Notes
1997	Vegas Vacation	Audrey Griswold	
1997	Scream 2	Dawnie	
1997	Friends 'Til the End	Alison	
1998	Can't Hardly Wait	Groupie	
1998	Jane Austen's Mafia	Carla	
1999	The Sex Monster	Lucia	
1999	Bowfinger	Young Actress at Audition	
2000	The Princess & the Barrio Boy	Sirena Garcia	
2001	The Princess and the Marine	Meriam Al Khalifa	Nominated—ALMA Award for Outstanding Actress
2001	Laud Weiner	Laud's Assistant	
2003	The Road Home	Stephanie	
2004	Homeland Security	Agent Jane Fulbar	
2006	Big Momma's House 2	Liliana Morales	
2007	Delta Farce	Maria	
2008	Struck	Jamie	Short film
2008	Felon	Laura Porter	
2013	The Program (SSR-7)	Commander Montgomery	Short film
2016	Lost Girls	Romina	Short film
2018	Cucuy: The Boogeyman	Rebecca Martin	
2021	Spiral: From the Book of Saw	Capt. Angie Garza	
2022	The Valet	Isabel	

=== Television ===
Year	Title	Role	Notes
1996	My Guys	Angela	TV Pilot
1996	Due South	Melissa	Episode: "Some Like It Red"
1996	Beverly Hills, 90210	Wendy Stevens	Episode: "Ray of Hope"
1997	ER	Angie	Episode: "The Long Way Around"
1997	Diagnosis: Murder	Sally Tremont	Episode: "Malibu Fire"
1998	Cybill	Book Store Clerk	Episode: "Fine Is Not a Feeling"
1999	Odd Man Out	Lauren	Episode: "The First Girlfriend's Club"
1999	Boy Meets World	Kelly	2 episodes
2000	Malcolm & Eddie	Kelly	Episode: "Swooped"
2000–2002	Resurrection Blvd.	Victoria Santiago	Main role
2002	Alias	Rebecca Martinez	Episode: "Dead Drop"
2002	The Twilight Zone	Joanne Yarrow	Episode: "Hunted"
2003	The Division	Rochelle	Episode: "Murder.com"
2003	Friends	Olivia	Episode: "The One with Rachel's Dream"
2003	CSI: Crime Scene Investigation	Jane	Episode: "All for Our Country"
2003	Law & Order: Special Victims Unit	Bettina Amador	Episode: "Mother"
2003	Nip/Tuck	Antonia Ramos	Episode: "Antonia Ramos"
2003	Charmed	(Future) Bianca	Episode: "Chris-Crossed"
2004	Cold Case	Elisa	Recurring role
2005	Blind Justice	Karen Bettancourt	Main role
2006	In Justice	Sonya Quintano	Main role
2007	24	Nadia Yassir	Main role
2009	Life	Whitney 'Plum' Paxman	Episode: "Initiative 38"
2009	The Storm	Devon Williams	2 episodes
2010	The Gates	Sarah Monohan	Main role
2010	NCIS: Los Angeles	Tracy Keller	Episode: "Standoff"
2012	GCB	Heather Cruz	Main role
2012	Private Practice	Lily Reilly	Episode: "The World According to Jake"
2014–2015	NCIS	Zoe Keates	3 episodes
2015–2016	Teen Wolf	The Desert Wolf	Recurring role
2015–2016	Criminal Minds	Natalie Colfax	2 episodes
2017–2023	Riverdale	Hermione Lodge	Main role (seasons 1–5), special guest star (season 5–7); 67 episodes
2020–present	The Loud House	Principal Ramirez (voice)	Recurring role
2020	Holly & Ivy	Nina	Television film
2021	Christmas CEO	Christmas Winnacker	Television film
2022	We Wish You a Married Christmas	Becca	Television film
2026	She Stole My Son's Heart	Detective Vicky Sanchez	Upcoming television film

=== Music videos ===
Year	Artist	Song	Notes
2011	Kristin Chenoweth	"I Want Somebody (Bitch About)"	Directed by Roman White
