= Ion Dacian National Operetta and Musical Theatre =

Operetta theatre in Bucharest, Romania

- Teatrul Național de Operetă și Musical "Ion Dacian"
- Opereta București, Opereta, TNOMID
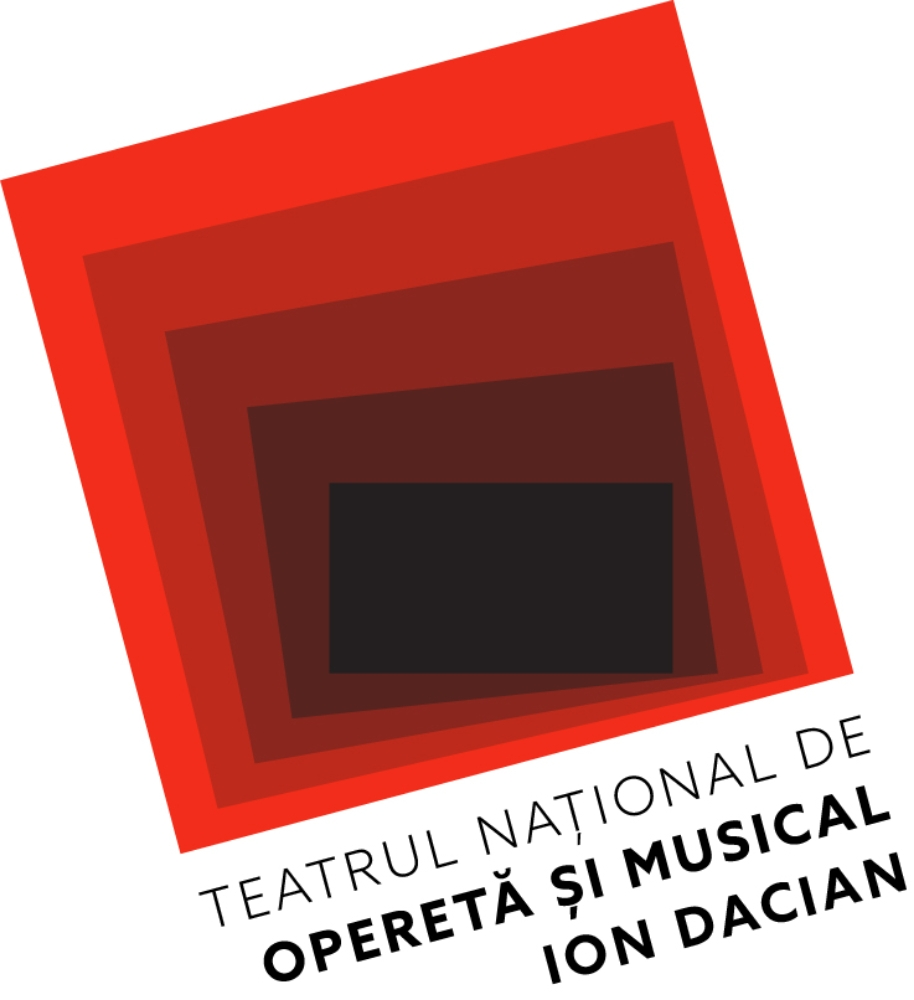
- Logo of the Ion Dacian National Theatre
- Interactive map of Ion Dacian National Operetta and Musical Theatre
- Full name: Teatrul Național de Operetă și Musical "Ion Dacian"
- Former names: Teatru Alhambra; Teatru al Armatei (devenu Teatrul Nottara); Teatru de Stat de Operetă; Teatrul de Operetă Ion Dacian; Teatrul Național de Operetă Ion Dacian
- Address: Bulevardul Octavian Goga 1 Bucharest; Romania
- Coordinates: 44.42412°N 26.11119°E
- Owner: Romanian State
- Operator: Romanian Ministry of Culture
- Capacity: 550
- Type: Theater
- Events: operettas; musicals; recitals; vocal performances; opera
- Field size: Large stage: 14 meters wide by 20 meters deep.
- Field shape: shoebox

Construction
- Built: 2015
- Opened: 24 January 2015
- Closed: Teatru Alhambra: 1931–1947; Teatru al Armatei (later Teatrul Nottara): 1947–1949; Teatru de Stat, in the "Regina Maria" Theatre, renamed State Operetta Theatre: 1950–1986
- Demolished: 1986
- Rebuilt: 2015
- Years active: Since 1931
- Cost: 13 millions euros
- Architect: Eliodor Popa

Website
- www.opereta.ro
- Management in 2025: Radu Petrovici, Manager (General Director); Alexandru Pătrașcu, Deputy General Director.

ap

The Ion Dacian National Operetta and Musical Theatre in Bucharest is a national cultural institution reestablished in November 2016 by the Romanian government. It is funded by the Ministry of Culture.

Located in the heart of the capital on the banks of the Dâmbovița, next to Octavian Goga Boulevard, the theatre inherits a long history and a heritage of performances created and staged over past centuries. Since 2015, it has been housed in a brand-new building specifically designed for musical performances. It is named after tenor Ion Dacian (1911–1981).

The theatre embraces a variety of musical genres for Romanian audiences, with a recent emphasis on musical comedies followed by operettas. Following common practice in the world of operetta, performances are always presented in the national language, Romanian, although some songs are occasionally performed in their original language.

== The origins of Romanian operetta: French influence and Viennese flavor ==
Romanian operetta, as performed in its early years and throughout the various periods it has undergone, derives its origins and influences from two principal traditions: French operetta and Viennese operetta. Numerous composers and librettists—initially foreign and later Romanian—studied in Paris, Berlin, Milan, Madrid, or Vienna, and subsequently introduced these musical and theatrical cultures first to Transylvania and later to Wallachia. French and Viennese influences soon became predominant, particularly through the works of Jacques Offenbach and Johann Strauss. French and Viennese operettas featured prominently in productions created abroad and were regularly performed in Romania; they also served as sources of inspiration for original Romanian compositions from 1850 onward.

== From the Oteteleșanu terrace to the State Operetta Theatre ==
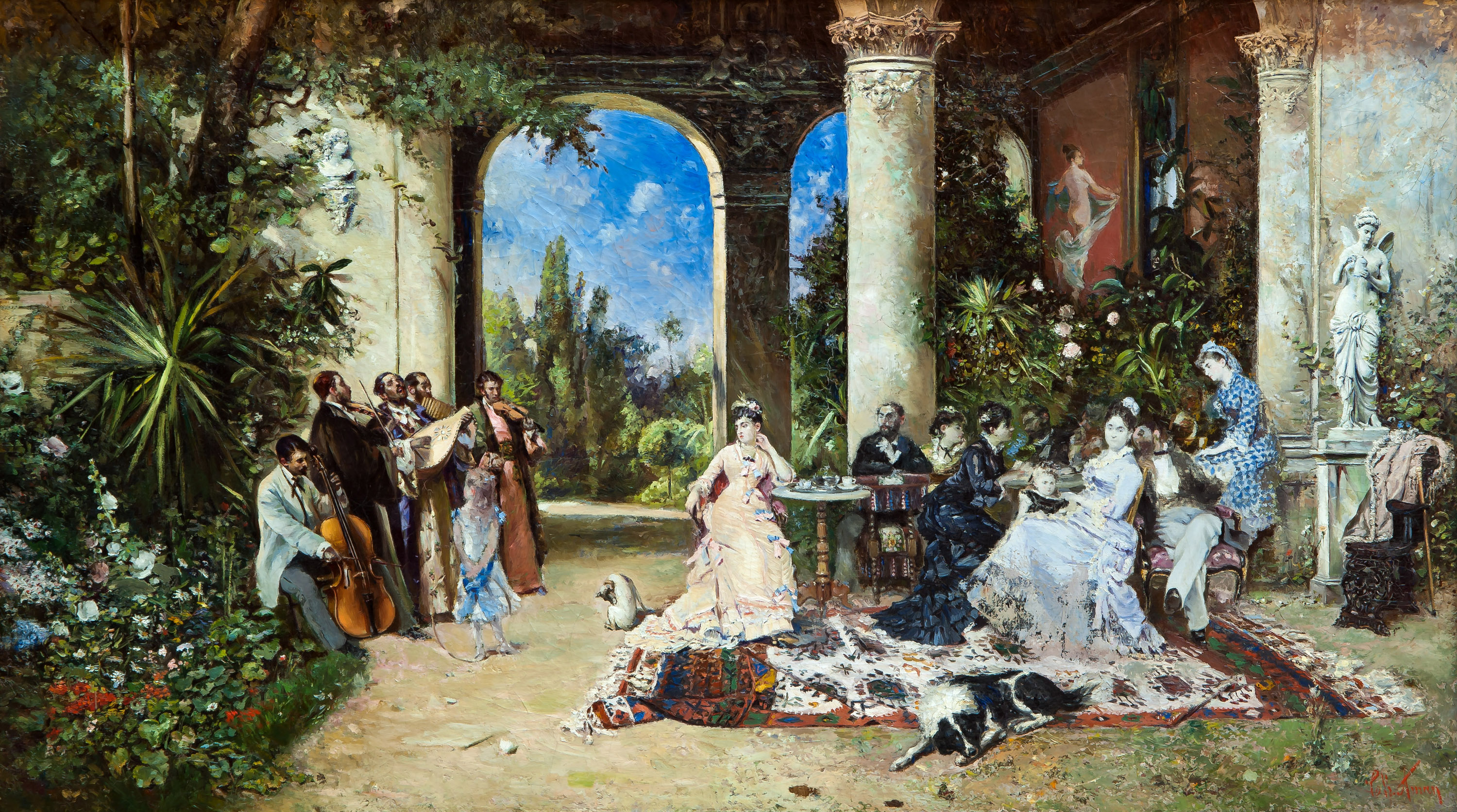
Theodor Aman – Celebration with Violinists (1884), oil on canvas, National Museum of Art of Romania, Bucharest

At the beginning of the 20th century, the former guinguette-café known as Terasa Oteteleșanu, located on Calea Victoriei in Bucharest an emblematic venue of interwar social and cultural life, played a key role as an informal space for the dissemination of music and light theatre. Operetta and vaudeville companies, such as the one led by the tenor Constantin Grigoriu, presented the genre's repertoire there to an increasingly receptive Bucharest audience, thereby contributing to its growing familiarity with European operetta. The urban transformations carried out between 1930 and 1934 led to the disappearance of the Terasa Oteteleșanu: on the site of the garden and café, the Palatul Telefoanelor was erected, a modern Art Deco building reflecting the architectural and functional changes of Bucharest. Thus disappeared one of the most vibrant informal stages of Bucharest's musical and theatrical life yet its memory remains at the origin of the process of institutionalizing operetta in the capital.

In the postwar climate, against the backdrop of the reconfiguration of theatrical life in Romania, the State Operetta Theatre was founded in 1950 and opened its doors on 7 November with the premiere of Vânt de libertate (The Wind of Liberty ) by Isaak Dunayevsky. This institution took up the legacy of the operetta repertoire cultivated at the Terasa Oteteleșanu and in other informal venues, while providing a stable structure, a permanent repertoire, and professional practitioners of the genre, thus becoming the organized nucleus of operetta life in Bucharest. Thus, the evolution from a summer venue such as the Terasa Oteteleșanu to the professional stage of the State Operetta Theatre reflects the transformation of operetta performances, shifting from a private, convivial, and seasonal initiative to their institutionalization within a permanent theatrical framework recognized at the national level.

These developments marked the early foundations of a modern musical life in the Romanian lands, initially attracting the aristocracy and, subsequently, the emerging bourgeoisie. The principalities were no longer a terra incognita for Western Europeans, especially since artistic itineraries linking Saint Petersburg and Istanbul commonly passed through Transylvania and the Danubian lands. Concerts were given there by figures such as Franz Liszt, Bernhard Romberg, Joseph Joachim, Johannes Brahms, and Johann Strauss, among others. During the eighteenth and nineteenth centuries, there was a notable influx of theatrical and musical ensembles—opera, vaudeville, Singspiel, and operetta which, whether passing through or settling for shorter or longer periods in the capitals of the principalities (Bucharest and Iași) or in other cities of the region, encountered an already informed and receptive audience. This was further encouraged by the fact that many intellectuals had begun their studies in Western Europe (Paris, Vienna, Budapest, Leipzig, Rome, Milan, Prague), where some of them also received musical training to varying degrees.

=== From vaudeville to Viennese influence ===
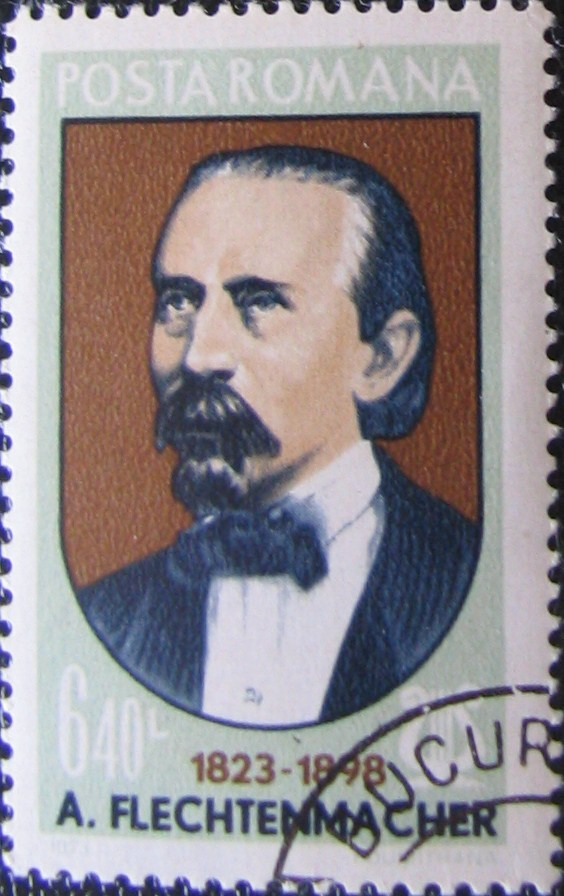
A. Flechtenmacher, Romanian postage stamp

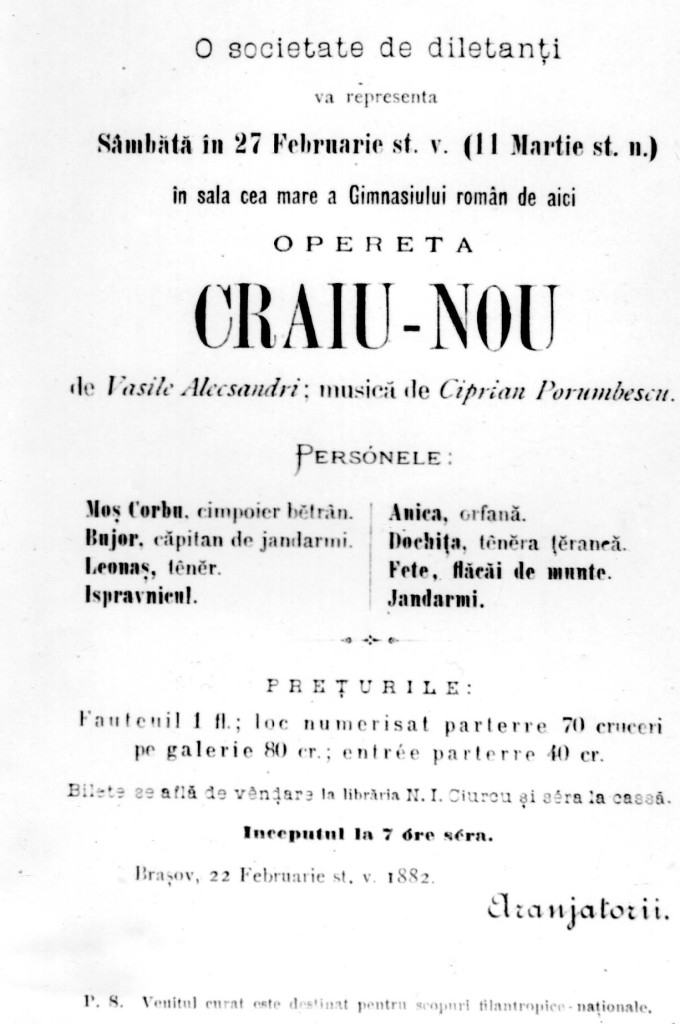
Premiere of Crai Nou in Brașov, 1882

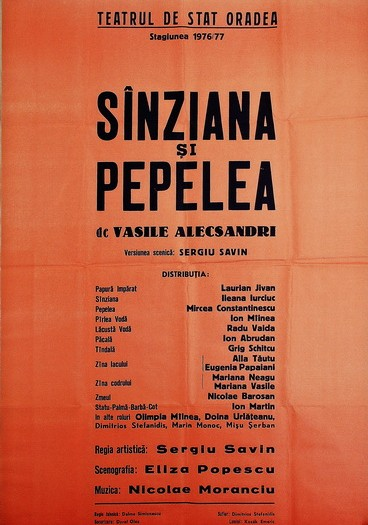
"Sânziana și Pepelea", Oradea, 1976

In nineteenth-century Romania, it was the Viennese style that achieved the greatest renown and success. The tradition of operetta proved both strong and continuous from its beginnings in the 1830s. At that time, artistic life was largely dominated by vaudeville. The classic and caricatural theme of vaudeville revolves around the wife, the deceived husband, and the "slamming doors": three essential characters—the husband, the wife, and the lover—who appear in rapid succession on stage, cross paths without seeing one another, and give rise to the famous line, "Heavens, my husband!". In 1848, Baba Hârca (Baba the Old Witch) became the first operetta created in Romania, premiered on 26 December 1848 at the National Theatre in Iași by the Moldavian composer of German Saxon origin Alexandru Flechtenmacher, who was seeking a distinctly Romanian musical style. The work is a vaudeville with an unusually developed musical dimension. Baba the Witch is a popular figure from traditional Romanian folktales, credited with freezing waters and living in isolation in a cave or at the top of a tall tree; fairy tales also attribute to her a benevolent aspect.

In 1882, another major success marked the birth of operetta in the country: Crai Nou (The New Moon), by the young composer Ciprian Porumbescu, with a libretto by Vasile Alecsandri. The premiere took place in Brașov on an improvised stage, the Romanian Gymnasium's festival hall, on 27 February 1882. The work, which highlights Romanian culture and traditions in contrast to Viennese culture, displays a distinctly patriotic character at a time when Transylvania was under Austro-Hungarian rule. It is particularly renowned for its famous Viennese-style chorus and for Porumbescu's success in integrating the Romanian folk spirit—such as the Hora, Doina, peasant dances, and traditional songs—into lyrical art while combining it with Western influences.

Three composers Eduard Caudella with Harță Răzeșul (1872), George Stephănescu with Sânziana și Pepelea (1880), on a libretto by Vasile Alecsandri and Scaiul bărbaților (1885), and Constantin Dimitrescu with Sergentul Cartuș (1895) and Nini (1897), were the first creators of Romanian operettas. They played a pivotal role in cultivating and establishing the Romanian public's keen interest in this art form, a genre that has remained popular to the present day.

The first lyrical companies frequently staged the "classical" works of French composers such as Offenbach and Lecocq. They established their foundations through performers like the tenor Constantin Grigoriu, who, with his troupe, presented nearly the entire operetta repertoire performed on European stages, notably on the renowned Oteteleșanu Terrace in Bucharest. This venue thus helped introduce audiences to artists such as Florica Cristoforeanu, Mara d'Asti, Florica Florescu, Ion Băjenaru, George Niculescu-Basu, Velimir Maximilian, and Nae Leonard—as well as theater practitioners such as Constantin Tănase and Nicolae Vlădoianu, directors of the "Cărăbuș" and "Alhambra" theater companies.

Oteteleșanu Terrace, Bucharest, circa 1900

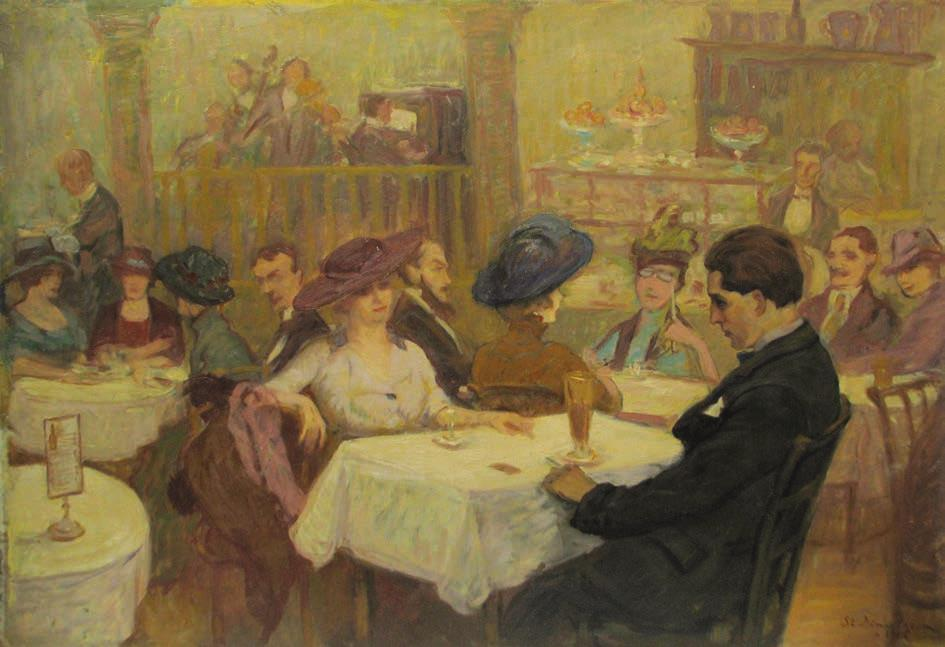
La Oteteleşanu, Ştefan Dimitrescu, 1915

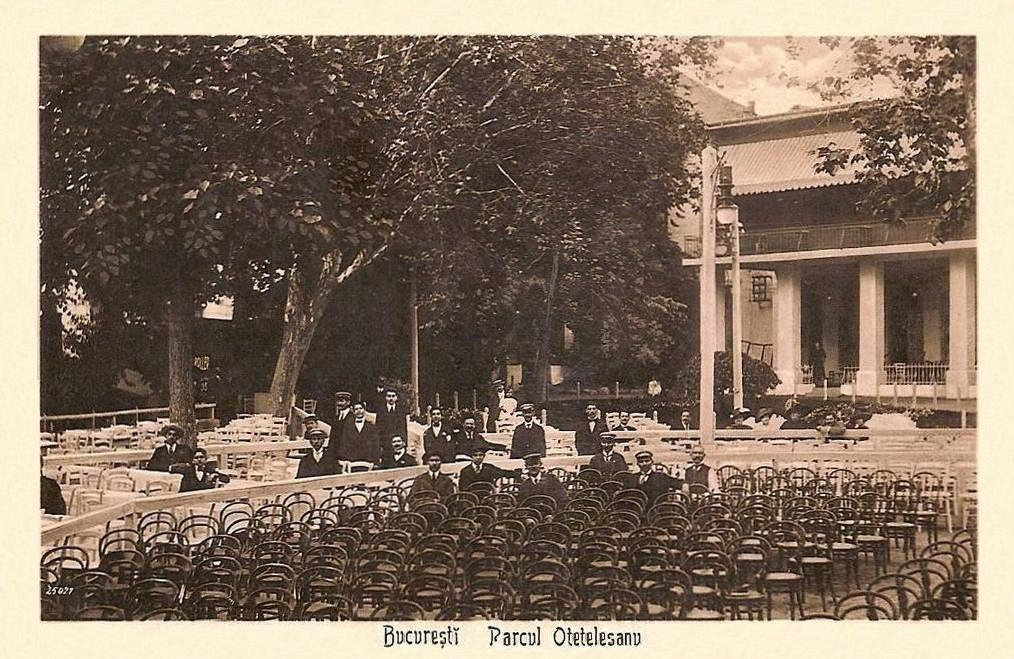
Postcard of the terrace, 1906

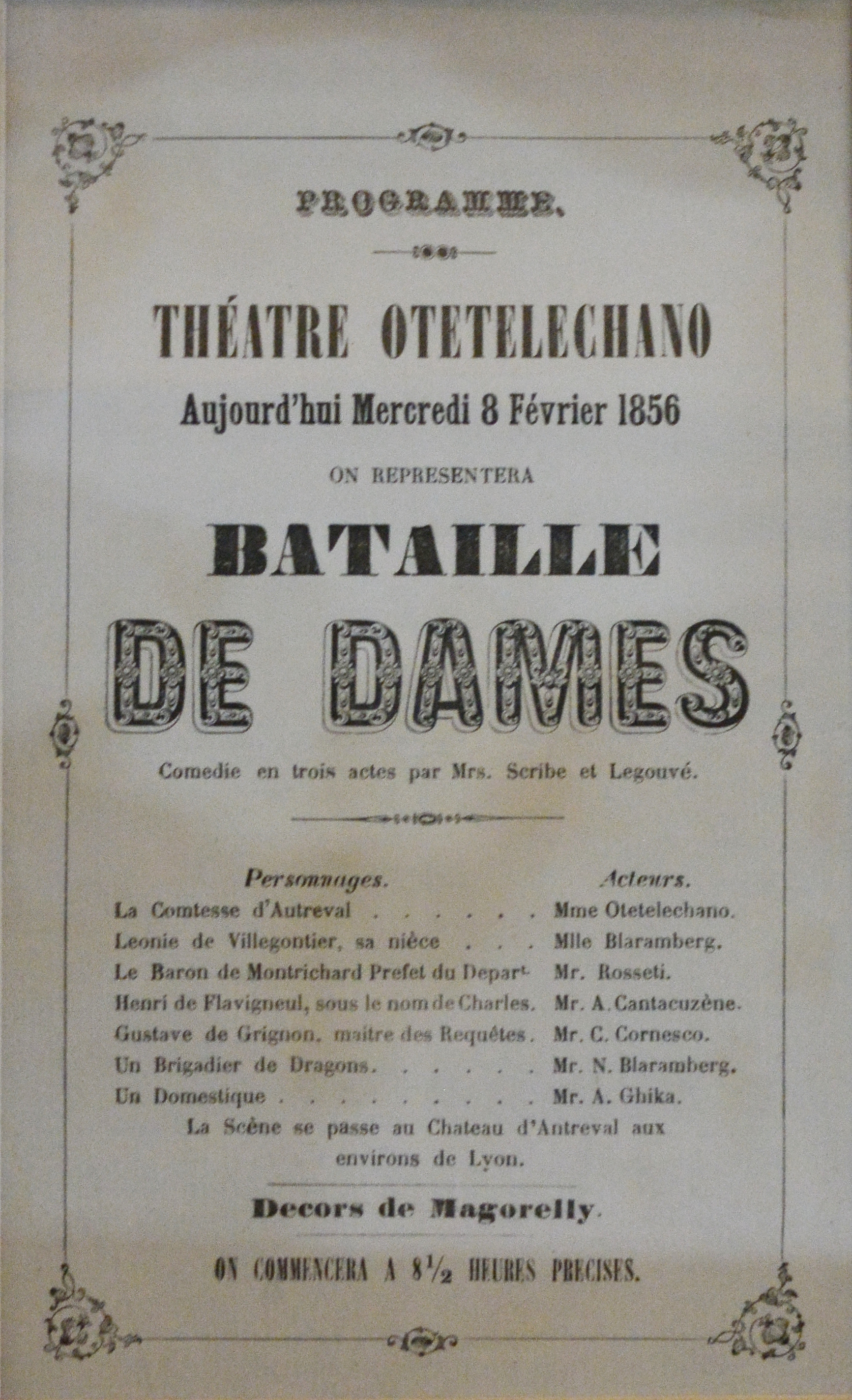
Program of February 8, 1856

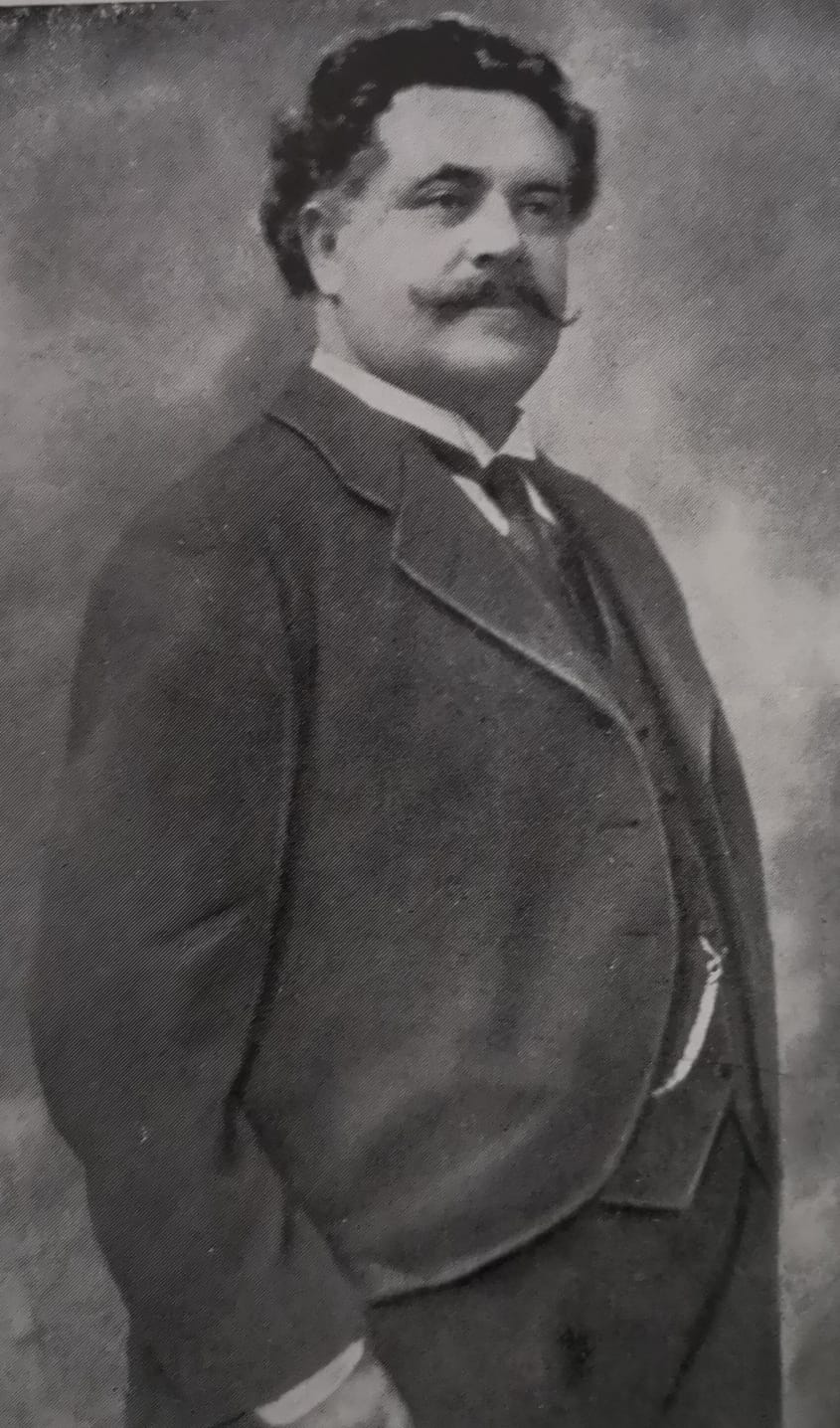
Constantin Grigoriu
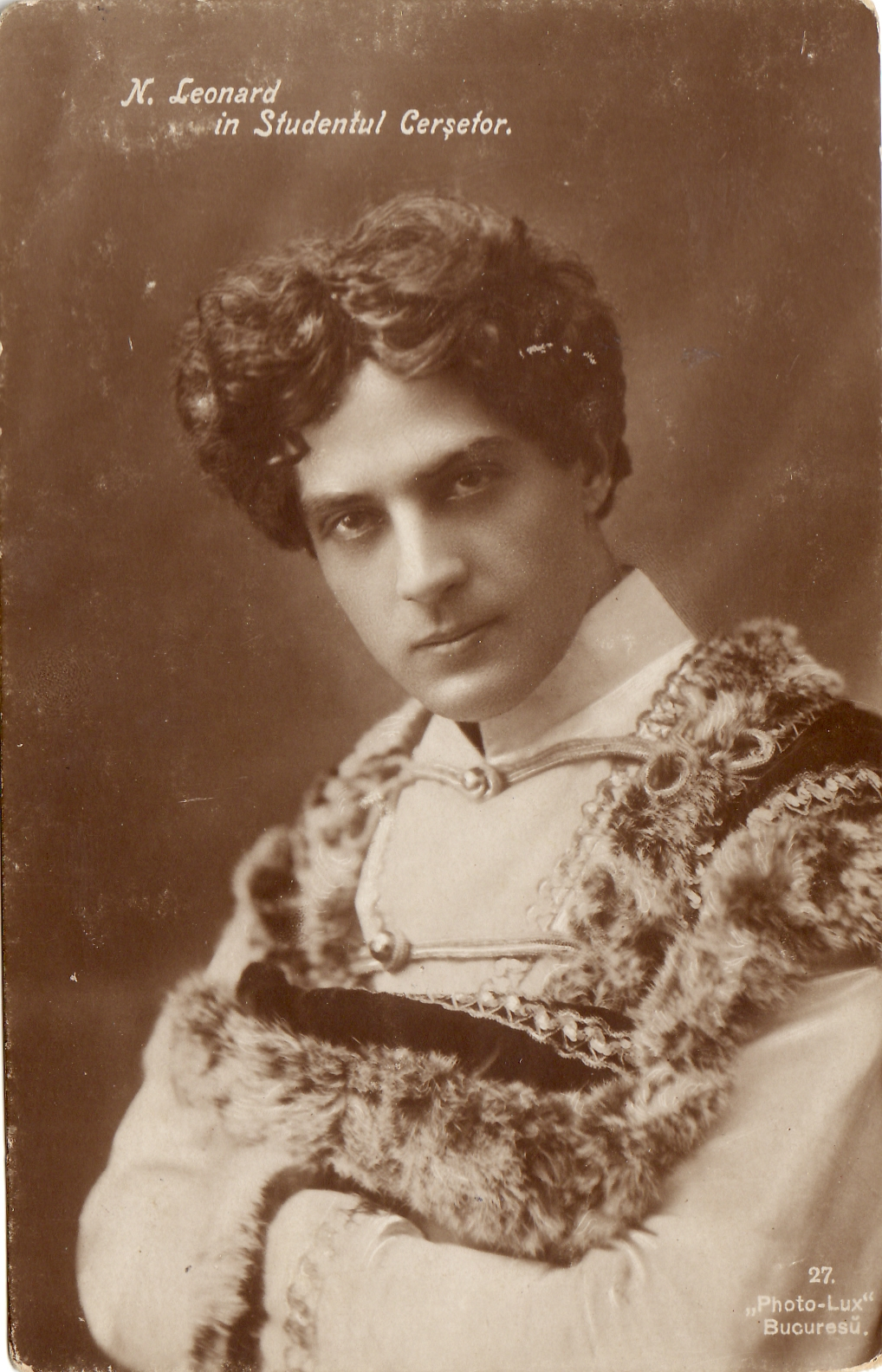
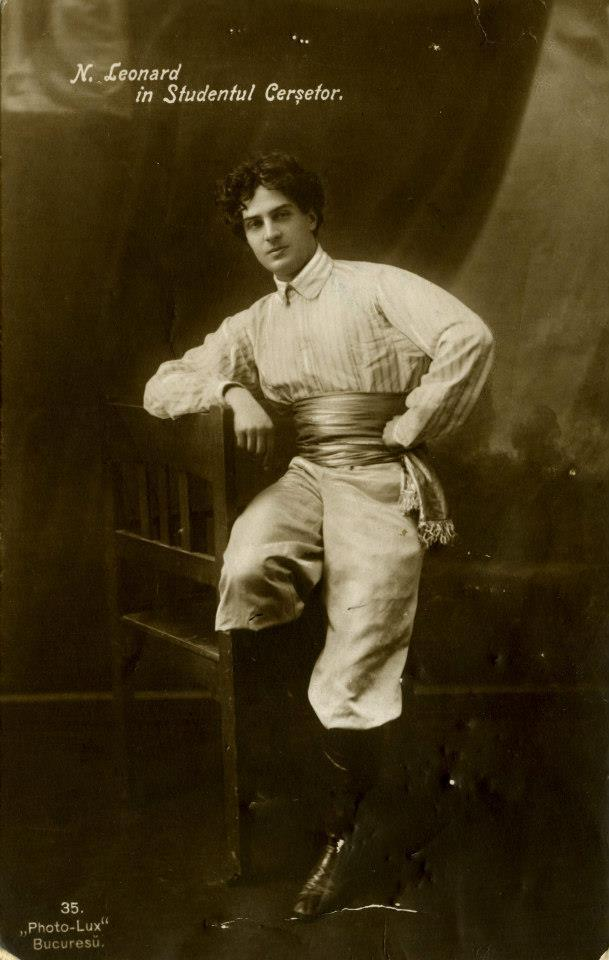
Nae Leonard in Studentul cerşetor (The Beggar Student)

One particularly gifted artist stood out among the performers of his time: Nae Leonard. A singer, actor, and dancer who would become known as the "Prince of Operetta," he enjoyed an impressive career. Noticed for his exceptional vocal abilities, he was invited to perform with the country's leading operetta company, Constantin Grigoriu's Romanian Lyric Company, taking on principal roles in Jacques Offenbach's La Périchole, Franz Lehár's The Count of Luxembourg, and Edmond Audran's La Mascotte. However, it was his performance as Danielo in Franz Lehár's celebrated operetta The Merry Widow in 1906 that secured his widespread fame. He became a public idol, celebrated in a manner reminiscent of Rudolph Valentino. That same year, he was engaged as principal tenor by the Vienna People's Opera to perform Don José in Carmen, a role that was met with great acclaim by both the press and audiences. After 1918, operetta no longer generated the same enthusiasm in Romania, and Leonard, facing financial difficulties, accepted engagements abroad. Between 1924 and 1926, he performed in Lyon, Paris, and Marseille, where he was warmly received by French audiences, giving 120 performances of Kálmán's Die Bajadere. Suffering from tuberculosis, he returned to Romania and died in his hometown of Câmpulung in 1928.

=== The epic of the Cărăbuș and Alhambra companies ===
The tenor's death coincided with the near disappearance of operetta in Romania, which was gradually replaced by musicals and revues. The Cărăbuș Company, founded in 1919 by Constantin Tănase and the Alhambra Company, established in 1931 by Nicolae Vlădoianu and housed in the hall on Strada Sărindar, became specialists in the genre, reviving operetta in the 1930s. Notably, they staged Ralph Benatzky's The White Horse Inn in 1935 at the Cărăbuș Theatre, followed by a nationwide tour lasting nearly two months. Other operettas followed, competing with productions presented by the Alhambra Revue Theatre , which had been installed in the Strada Sărindar hall in the autumn of 1931.

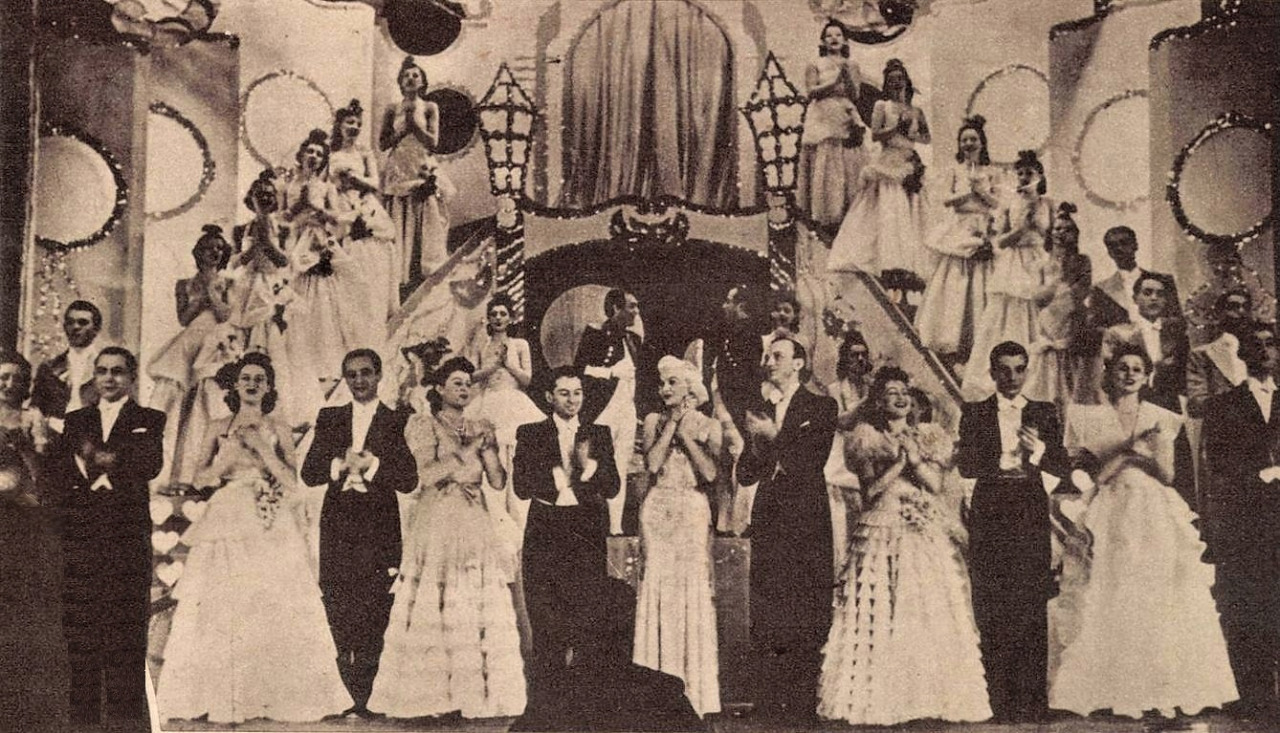
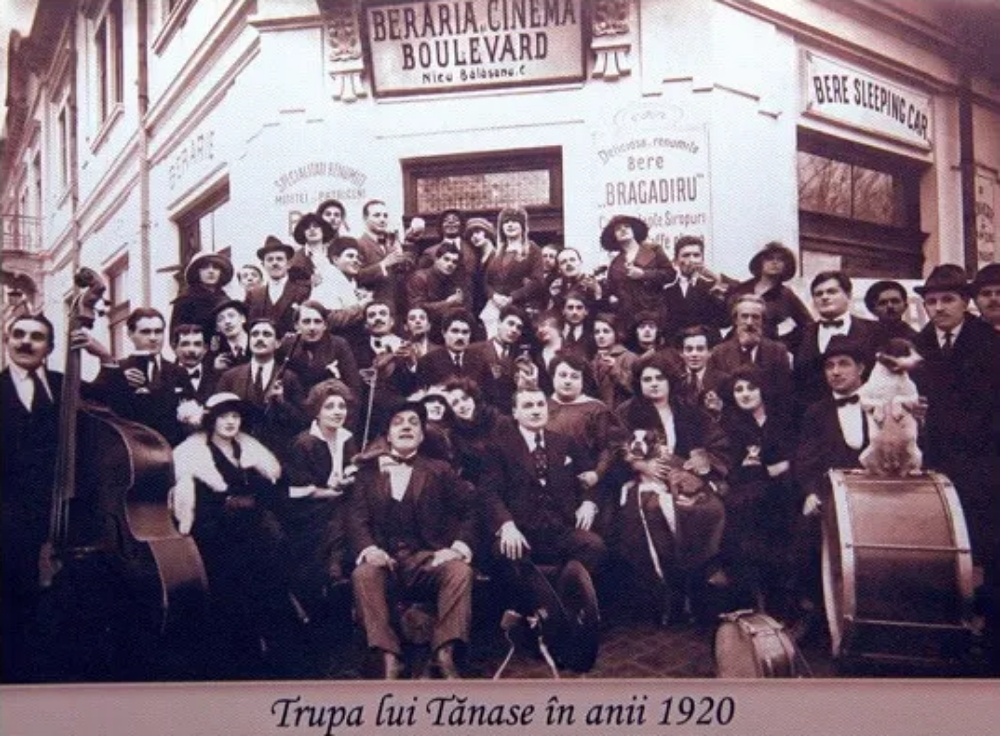
Revue at the Alhambra (top), and The Cărăbuș Troupe (bottom)
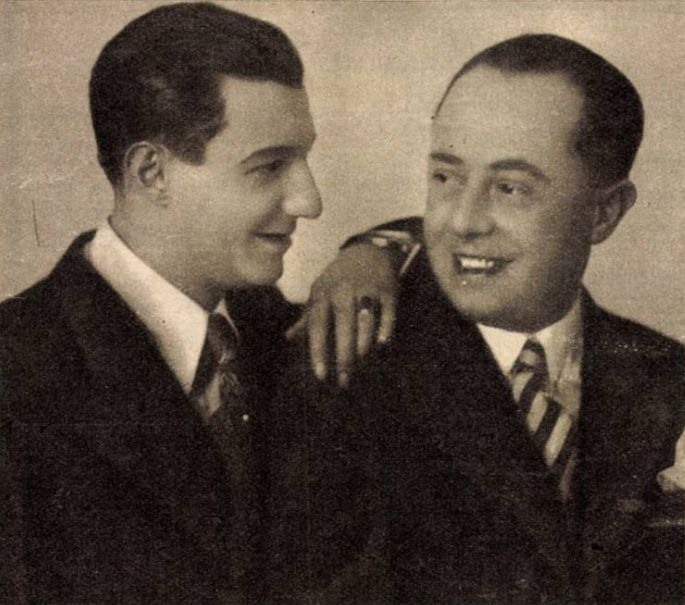
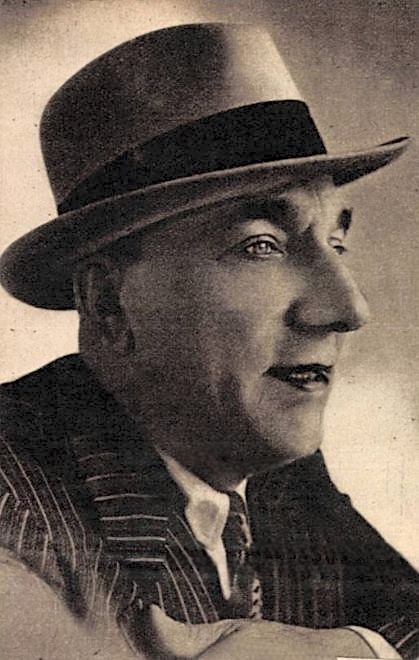
Nicolae Vlădoianu (top right) and Constantin Tănase (bottom)

Nicolae Vlădoianu was in search of a new Nae Leonard when he discovered a rising star: the young tenor Ion Dacian at the Cluj Opera. Dacian joined the company in 1939 and would go on to become a leading figure in contemporary Romanian operetta. In 1941, he performed in Der Vogelhändler (The Bird Seller) by Carl Zeller, Frühlingsstimmen (Voices of Spring), and Wiener Blut (also known as Un vals vienez) by Johann Strauss II. From 1941 to 1944, operetta tours at the Alhambra, featuring Ion Dacian as the leading tenor, traveled extensively across the country.

In one of his articles, the writer and dramatic critic Mircea Ștefănescu lavishes praise on the tenor:

Domnul Dacian este, pentru operetă, ceea ce aruncă marea la o mie de ani. Dacă nu era domnia sa, opereta trebuia să mai aștepte reînvierea la noi, așa cum sa-a așteptat-o atâta vreme. Nuntă fără mire nu se poate

[For operetta, Mr Dacian is the elusive artist who appears only once in a millennium. Had it not been for him, operetta would have had to wait even longer for its revival here, just as it had waited for so long. There can be no wedding without a groom.]

More than sixteen operetta premieres were staged at the Alhambra between 1940 and 1946, a true resurrection of the genre in Romania. Most of them went on tour throughout the country, with Ion Dacian, who became co-director in 1942, performing the leading role. The productions were meticulously crafted, and the stagings were considered remarkable by connoisseurs and critics alike. Some scenes displayed an outpouring of luxury and beauty, as in Eine Nacht in Venedig (A Night in Venice), and the performances stood out for their quality and execution.

The page of the history of the Alhambra troupe is definitively turned with its final production in the autumn of 1946: Die Zirkusprinzessin (The Circus Princess) by the Hungarian composer Emmerich Kálmán. Despite its favorable reception in Romania, the work proved to be a commercial disaster due to the cost of its tour in the Orient in 1947. Desperate and ruined, the troupe's director, Nicolae Vlădoianu, took his own life that same year, unable to cope with the bankruptcy of his company, which had already been weakened since the end of the war. Constantin Tănase had himself died in 1945, at the height of his fame, surrounded by immense popularity. The causes of his death remain uncertain to this day. According to one unconfirmed hypothesis, he may have been assassinated by the Russians, who were displeased with some of his songs, highly critical of the Soviet occupation, which he had refused to censor or alter.

=== The iron curtain falls on the operetta stage: 1946–1954 ===
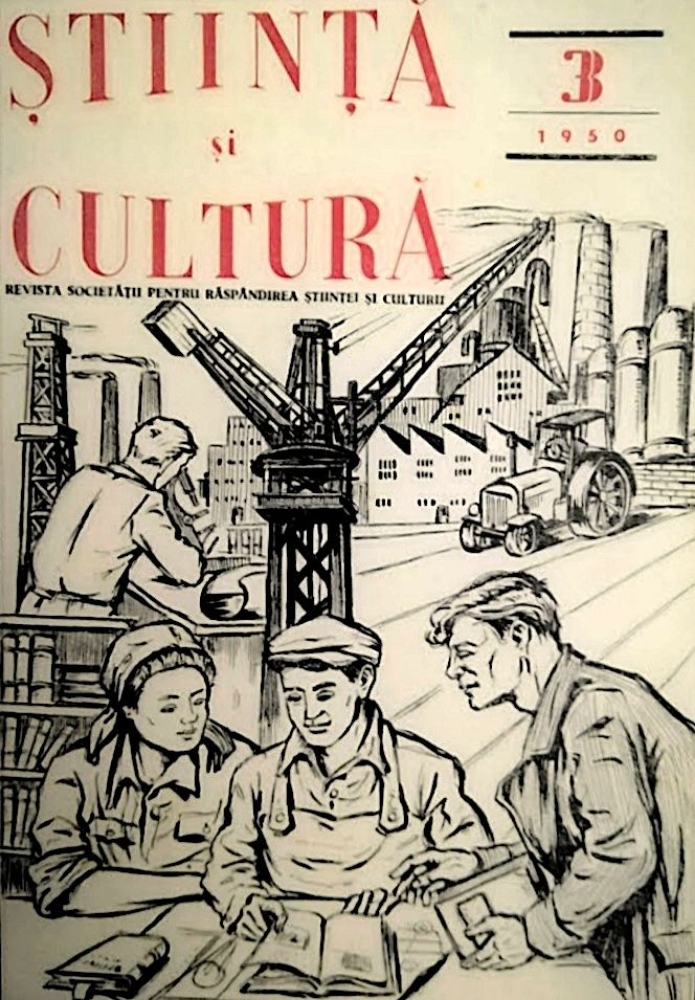
Romanian communist propaganda journal Science and Culture, 1950

The first period of communism in Romania is marked by a close relationship with the Soviet Union, which occupied the country and consequently imposed very strict censorship and supervision. In the immediate aftermath of the war, the performing arts in the Soviet Union were subjected to a tightening of control, which was replicated in all satellite states. Art was expected above all to reflect the struggle for socialist ideals. The consequences for culture were direct, as it was subjected to the most immediate ideological pressures. "Drawing the masses toward culture" became the leitmotiv of the socialist authorities. More "accessible" adaptations resulted in insipid outcomes that attracted no audience. Folklore was likewise put through the mill of communist dogma, fragmented or distorted along the model of Soviet popular orchestras and song-and-dance ensembles. Aesthetic principles were sacrificed to political imperatives. The near-obligation to draw inspiration from popular and workers' songs had a strong influence on performances.

Theatre, opera, and musical productions such as operetta or musical comedy were disfigured or manipulated by Soviet-communist propaganda. Artists already in place in 1945–1946 were not removed, but were required to assume the role of zealous laudators. Socialist realism, or the doctrine of a single creative method, required an internationalist and strongly pro-Soviet outlook. Art was required to serve ideology, and operetta and musical comedy were no exception. "Cosmopolitanism" and "unhealthy bourgeois influences" were relentlessly persecuted, and productions were recalibrated accordingly.

Simfoniile, operele, operetele, baletul, oratoriile, sonatinele, cvartetele, marşurile, corurile etc. abundă în teme sociale şi socialiste. Noile creaţii "sunt luate în 30 majoritate din viaţă, se referă la om, la lupta lui, la victorie"

[Symphonies, operas, operettas, ballets, oratorios, sonatas, quartets, marches, choruses, etc. abound in social and socialist themes. The new creations "are mostly taken from life, referring to man, his struggle, and victory.".]

Decree establishing the State Operetta Theatre of Bucharest, 1950

On the other hand, access to theatres and the opera was very limited. Trade unions and workers' organizations controlled 90% of the seats. Only 10% of seats were open to the general public, forcing regular patrons to endure long queues at the single state-run box office. As a result, a thriving black market developed. A CIA report dated 1954 provides a very clear picture of this situation.

The theatrical and musical production of socialist Romania in the 1950s thus represents a parenthesis whose artistic interest was secondary and at times very weak, or even nonexistent. It became a mere political instrument of mediocre craftsmanship, whose primary objective was to shape the New Man, to which the arts were of course expected to contribute. Artistic activity in the field of musical performance amounted to little more than a distortion—sometimes bordering on the ridiculous—of the meaning and beauty of operetta, under the pretext of clearly inserting the obsession with class struggle into every work.

In 1950, after an intermediate period from 1947 to 1950 at the Theatre of the Armed Forces, the creation of a musical section on Strada Uranus provided operetta composers and performers with a new home at the "Regina Maria" Theatre, renamed the State Operetta Theatre on 7 November 1950. The building, a remarkable example of 1920s architecture, located on Piața Națiunilor Unite, was demolished by Ceaușescu in 1986. The theatre opened with the Romanian adaptation of the work by Soviet composer Isaak Dunayevsky, Vânt de Libertate (Wind of Freedom), a title laden with irony for Romanians living through the harshest period of the communist dictatorship. Romanian operetta nevertheless also found its place through successful works such as Ana Lugojana (1950) by the composer Filaret Barbu, or Culegătorii de stele (1954) by Florin Comișel, which featured fishermen, workers, engineers, and office employees from a hydroelectric power plant—a work that has since fallen into oblivion. Finally, for certain productions with particularly strong political resonance, a "public" was actively mobilized and encouraged by the communist authorities to queue, allowing the regime to boast of their popular success.

=== A structured stage, a stable ensemble, and a predominantly classical repertoire (1954–1970) ===
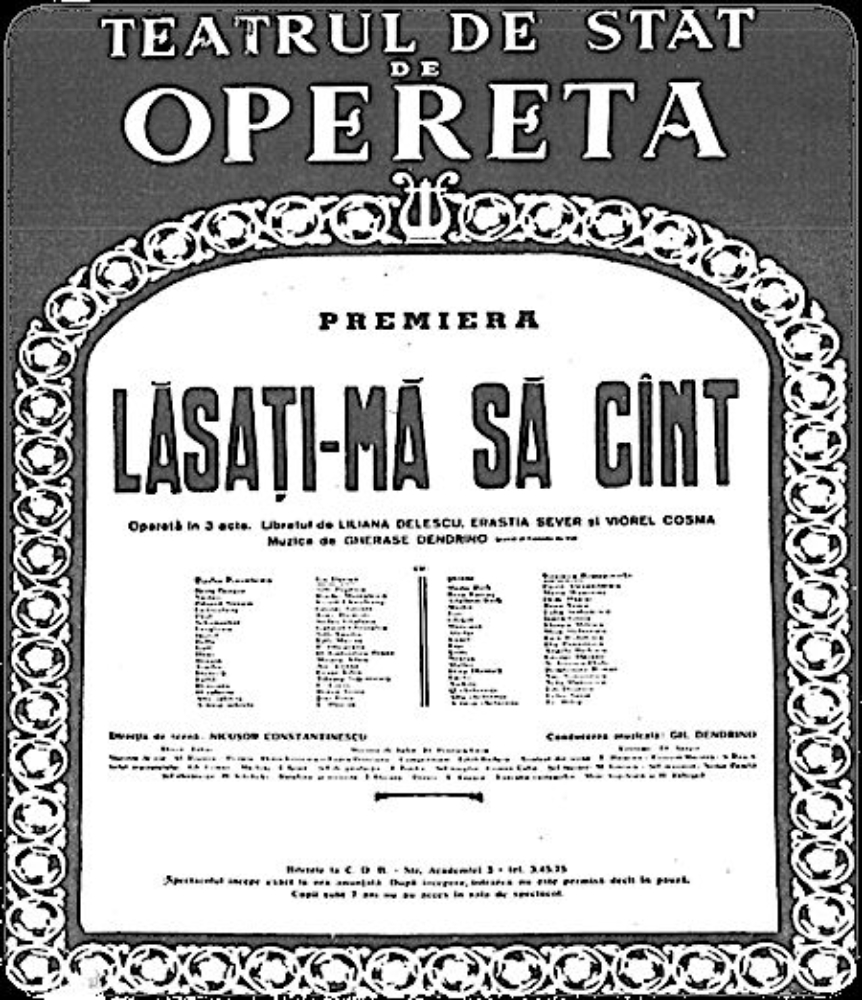
Lăsați-mă să cânt, period poster, 1954

30 October 1954 marks is an important date in Romanian creative life with the premiere of the work Lăsați-mă să cânt (Let Me Sing) by Gherase Dendrino, to a libretto by Erastia Sever, Liliana Delescu, and Viorel Cosma, in which the leading role was performed by Ion Dacian. This anniversary work, written in 1953 to commemorate the 100th anniversary of the birth of Ciprian Porumbescu, is a celebration of his operetta Crai Nou, composed 72 years earlier in 1882. In a context of decline for operetta in Romania, the production presented on the stage of the State Operetta Theatre was a success undoubtedly owed in large part to its cast. The work was also performed abroad, in other countries of the Eastern Bloc, and its libretto was translated into German, Czech, Russian, and Hungarian.

Reference works—primarily classical Viennese or Hungarian operettas—contributed to the artistic quality of the theatre's productions. The institution's repertoire was shaped under the leadership of one of the most distinguished tenors in the history of operetta, Ion Dacian, whose name has appeared in the theatre's title since 1992. It thus included: Țara surâsului (Das Land des Lächelns) by Franz Lehár (1965); Secretul lui Marco Polo (The Secret of Marco Polo) by Francis Lopez (1966); Sânge vienez (Wiener Blut) by Johann Strauss II (1967); Contesa Marița (Gräfin Mariza) by Emmerich Kálmán (1967).

It is difficult to assess the quality of performances based on Romanian reviews, as critics were not always free to express their true opinions. However, reviews from Western countries praised the productions staged by Romanian performers. The company undertook several tours, not only in the USSR (1957) and other satellite countries—Hungary, Bulgaria, and Poland (1965)—but also in Italy at the Trieste Operetta Festival, where Prințesa circului (Die Zirkusprinzessin) was performed, and later in West Berlin and Munich in 1968 with Contesa Marița (Gräfin Mariza), where all texts were translated into German. The Romanian Operetta Theatre's success continued in Austria, West Germany, Belgium, Luxembourg, and the Netherlands in 1969, and again in the FRG in 1970. Ion Dacian, who had directed the theatre since 1963, staged the productions. He was removed from his position in 1971 without explanation. That same year, he paid tribute to the composer Gherase Dendrino with a commemorative work, Medalion.

The last production mounted by Ion Dacian as director and stage manager was a musical in 1969: My Fair Lady by composer Frederick Loewe. Although the project represented a challenge for Dacian and his troupe, the outcome proved successful. Ion Dacian was appreciated by critics both as a director and as an actor, since he also performed in the production. In the leading role of Eliza Doolittle, the soprano Cleopatra Melidoneanu' s performance contributed to her subsequent national and international recognition within the company. The work remained in continuous performance at the theatre for 34 years.

=== A balance between classical works and Romanian pieces: 1971–1989 ===
The successors of Ion Dacian continued to maintain a balance between works from the classical Austrian and Hungarian repertoires (Strauss, Lehár, Kálmán, Benatzky, etc.) and Romanian creations such as Spune inimioară, spune! (Say, My Heart, Say!, 1972) by Elly Roman, Mătușa mea, Faustina (My Aunt Faustina) (1973) by Liviu Cavassi and Doru Butoiescu, and Raspantia (1975) and Leonard (1976) by Florin Comișel. The domestic programming reflected the contributions of authors who played a significant role in Romanian operetta: Gherase Dendrino (1901–1973), Filaret Barbu (1903–1984), Nicolae Kirculescu (1903–1985), Elly Roman (1905–1996), Alfred Mendelsohn (1910–1966), Viorel Doboș (1917–1985), Henry Mălineanu (1920–2000), Florin Comișel (1922–1977), and George Grigoriu (1927–1999). This approach allowed the theatre to combine an international tradition with Romanian cultural identity, sustaining public interest in the operetta genre.

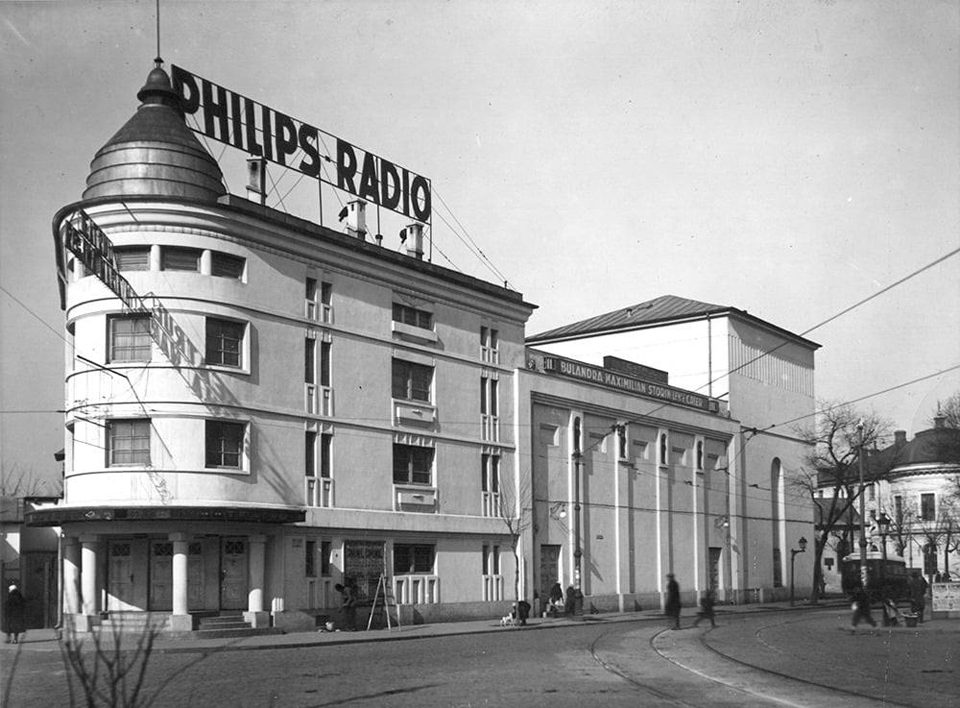
Regina Maria Theatre, 1930

In 1977, to celebrate the centenary of Romania's independence, a special work was staged: Eternel Iubiri (Eternal Love), composed by George Grigoriu with a libretto by Constantin Florea. The premiere took place on 7 May 1977 at the State Operetta Theatre of Bucharest. The work, centered on the struggle against the Turks, aligned with the nationalist propaganda of the Communist Party, emphasizing patriotism and heroes of Romanian history. This national-communist cultural policy, which became highly visible under Ceaușescu, had already been initiated in the 1960s by Gheorghe Gheorghiu-Dej.

American musicals also appeared on the programme, including Oklahoma! by Richard Rodgers in 1974 and West Side Story in 1978, whose title was translated into Romanian as Poveste din cartierul de vest, by Leonard Bernstein. These productions attracted a new audience.

From 1976 to 1981, under the direction of choreographer Mihaela Atanasiu, a new style was introduced, particularly through modern ballet. A new generation of creators and directors took over, updating the classics that had long been performed at the Bucharest Operetta Theatre. The Bucharest stage became a laboratory for creative experimentation. In 1978, 1979, and 1982, extensive tours were organized in Italy, Sardinia, and Sicily, where performances in front of tens of thousands of spectators (outdoor stages) were very well received.

From 1982 onward, the situation deteriorated, reflecting broader conditions across the country, with increasingly difficult financial and material circumstances. The company split into two: one group continued with the traditional repertoire, while a smaller ensemble focused on trendy entertainment productions. In 1986, the theatre was demolished as part of Ceaușescu's vast and destructive architectural program, and the company was relocated to the small hall of the National Theatre Bucharest (TNB).

== Restored freedom and the reconstruction of a new theatre. ==
=== In search of identity: 1990–2006 ===
The institution went through a period of experimentation and reassessment, seeking to adapt to new conditions. Under the direction of Sorana Coroamă-Stanca (1990–1992), attempts were made to modernize the repertoire, notably by staging a political cabaret (Plaisir d'amour) and organizing concerts such as the Stabat Mater by Rossini or a "Mozart Concert." In 1992, during the mandate of Nicolae Ciubuc, the theatre was renamed the Ion Dacian Operetta Theatre in honor of the great tenor and former director.

Between 1994 and 1999, the institution was directed by the tenor Dorin Teodorescu, who gave it new momentum, with the support of Daniel Eufrosin (artistic director), Cleopatra Melidoneanu, and Amza Săceanu. Between 1990 and 1997, owing to uncertain funding, the theatre sought to maintain financial balance by resorting to collage techniques and event-based productions. It was only from 1997 onward that Offenbach returned to the programme with Frumoasa Elena (La Belle Hélène). During this period, Micuța Dorothy (Little Dorothy), composed by Marius Țeicu, La Calul bălan (The White Horse Inn) by Ralph Benatzky, Paganini by Franz Lehár, and Lăsați-mă să cânt (Let Me Sing) were staged by two leading sopranos and stage directors, Migry Avram Nicolau and Constanța Câmpeanu. After fifty seasons since the creation of the State Theatre in 1950, the institution offered a repertoire of 18 titles spanning a wide range of genres: operetta, comic opera, musical comedy, modern operetta, and operetta for children. To mark this anniversary, Die Blume von Hawaii (The Flower of Hawaii) by Paul Abraham was performed on 30 September 2000.

On 19 January 2001, the theatre was officially granted the status of a National Theatre. The season was marked by the premiere of Die keusche Susanne (Chaste Susanne) by Jean Gilbert, also staged by Constanța Câmpeanu and Migry Avram Nicolau. On 17 June of the same year, another American musical was highlighted: Hello, Dolly! (musical) (1964) by Jerry Herman. At the end of November, a one-week tour was organized in Germany, featuring three productions performed entirely in German: Der Zigeunerbaron (The Gypsy Baron) by Strauss, La Belle Hélène (1864) by Offenbach, and a potpourri dedicated to the life of composer Robert Stolz, Medalion Robert Stolz.

The 2002–2003 season opened with a major national premiere, Fântâna Blanduziei (The Fountain of Blanduzia), created by one of the most renowned contemporary composers, Cornel Trăilescu, to a libretto by the poet and playwright Aurel Storin, based on the original work (1883) by the great Romanian poet Vasile Alecsandri. Productions for children were also performed for more than five years, every Wednesday and Thursday. In 2003, a new collaboration began with the national cultural and educational television channel, TVRM Educațional, aimed at promoting the theatre's activities. Lăsați-mă să cânt returned to the repertoire during the 2003–2004 season. Productions multiplied until 2005 despite the destruction of the performance hall by fire.

=== A new direction and success confirmed by the public: 2006–2012 ===
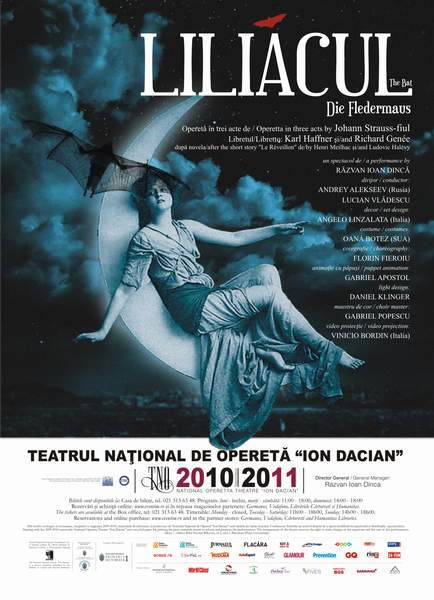
Liliacul, 2010–2011

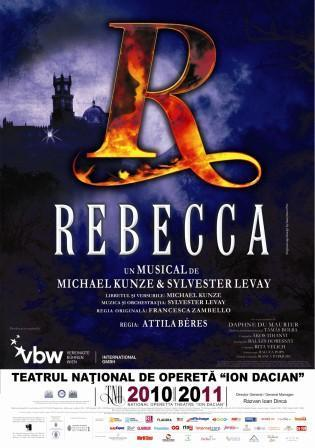
Rebecca, 2010–2011

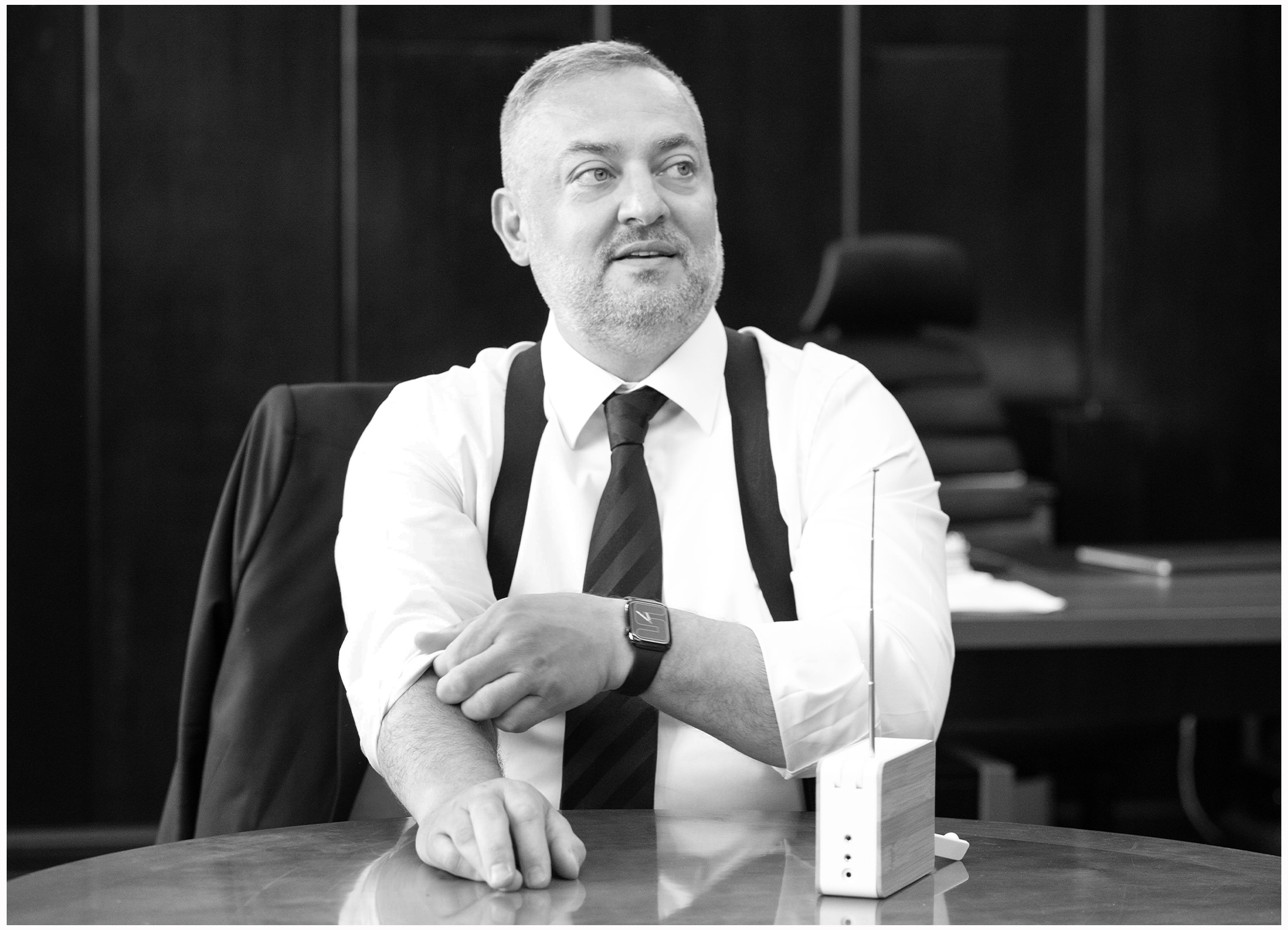
Răzvan-Ioan Dincă, 2022

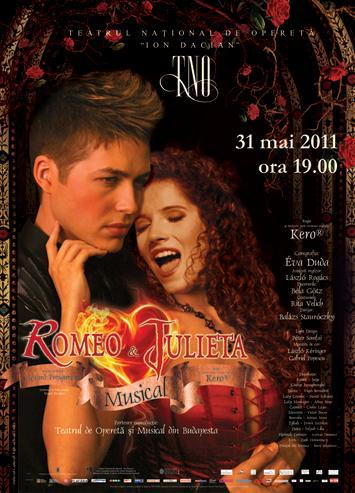
Romeo și Julieta, 2010–2011

From 2006 to 2012, a new leadership transformed the theatre's operations, renewed its repertoire, and gave the institution an international profile. This leadership was embodied by Răzvan-Ioan Dincă, General Director from 2006 to 2012, and subsequently General Director of the National Opera from December 2012 to 2015 (to which the National Operetta Theatre was attached from 2013 to 2016). In addition to his roles as a stage director, Dincă served as head of the SCENART programme, a project implemented from 2009 to 2013 and funded by the European Union, in collaboration with the Italian institution Accademia Teatro alla Scala in Milan. The programme aimed to support skills development and professions in the performing arts in Romania. The country was indeed facing the disappearance of training centres for stage professions following the fall of communism, as well as the absence of a legal or technical framework for theatrical and performance-related occupations. He succeeded in bringing this project to fruition, providing improved organisation and a genuine training centre for all theatres in Romania.

While committed to the development of musical theatre alongside operettas, he also initiated the Bucharest Festival of Musical Performances in 2008: Festivalului Internațional al Artelor Spectacolului Muzical "Viața e frumoasă!" (International Festival of the Musical Performing Arts "Life Is Beautiful!"). The first edition proved to be a success, and its productions were considered to be of high quality. The festival took place annually from 2008 to 2016.

During his tenure, while the theatre had access to the Studio hall of the TNB between 2008 and 2012, major productions were presented to the public: Liliacul (Die Fledermaus), awarded in 2010, Die Csárdásfürstin or Silvia in Romanian (The Riviera Girl and The Gipsy Princess), three musicals: Rebecca (musical) by Sylvester Levay with a libretto by Michael Kunze, Roméo et Juliette, de la haine à l'amour by Gérard Presgurvic, The Phantom of the Opera by Andrew Lloyd Webber with a libretto by Charles Hart, as well as the operetta The Merry Widow by Franz Lehár. An artistic collaboration between Romania and Hungary was also established through productions co-produced with the Budapest Operetta Theatre.

During the period 2006–2011, artistic activity was vibrant and audiences were substantial, as evidenced by the activity and management reports submitted to the Ministry of Culture in 2012. The theatre managed to cover 15% of its budget, a figure that has not been reached since.

Posters of the International Festival of the Musical Performing Arts Viața e frumoasă!

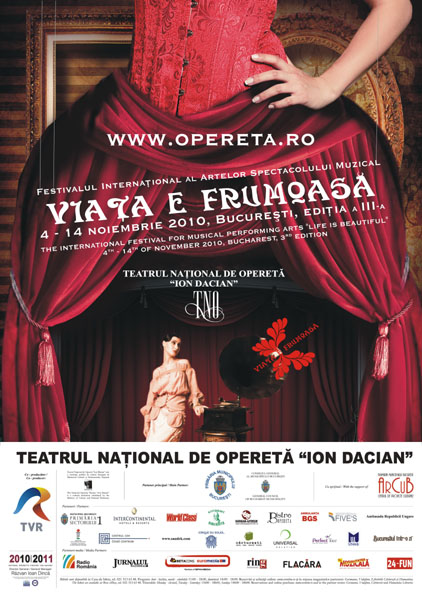

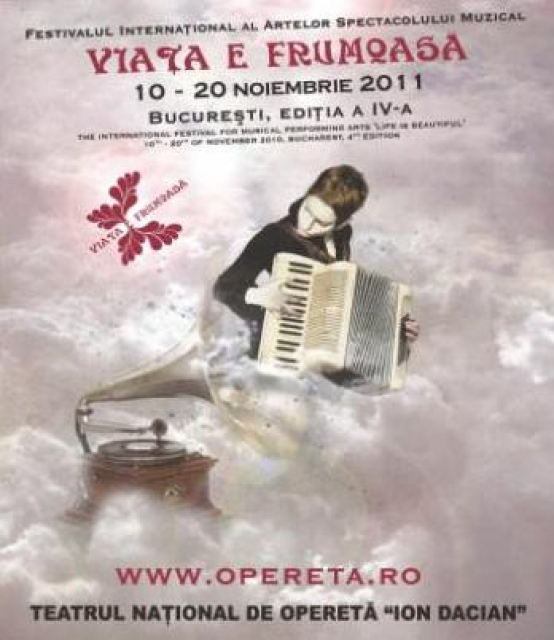

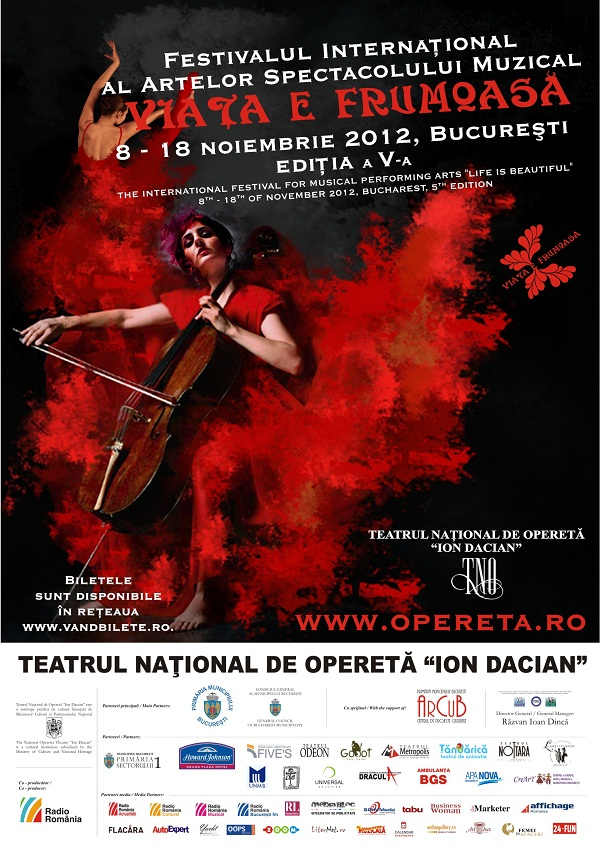

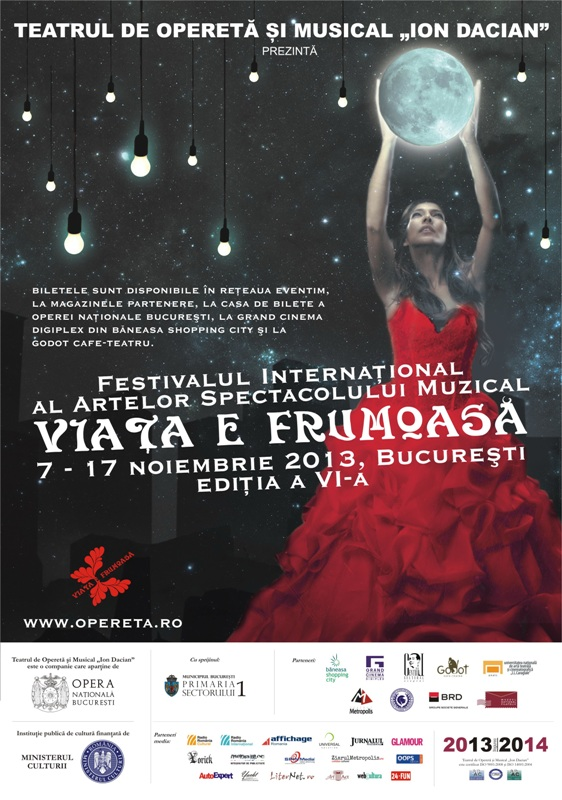

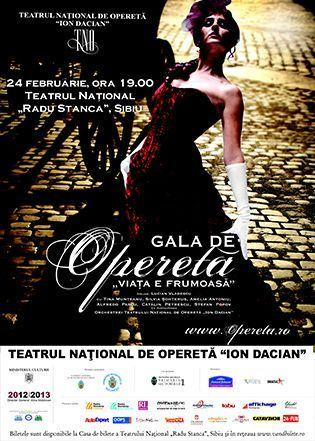

=== A turbulent chapter with the Opera and the construction of the new "Ion Dacian" Theatre: 2012–2015 ===
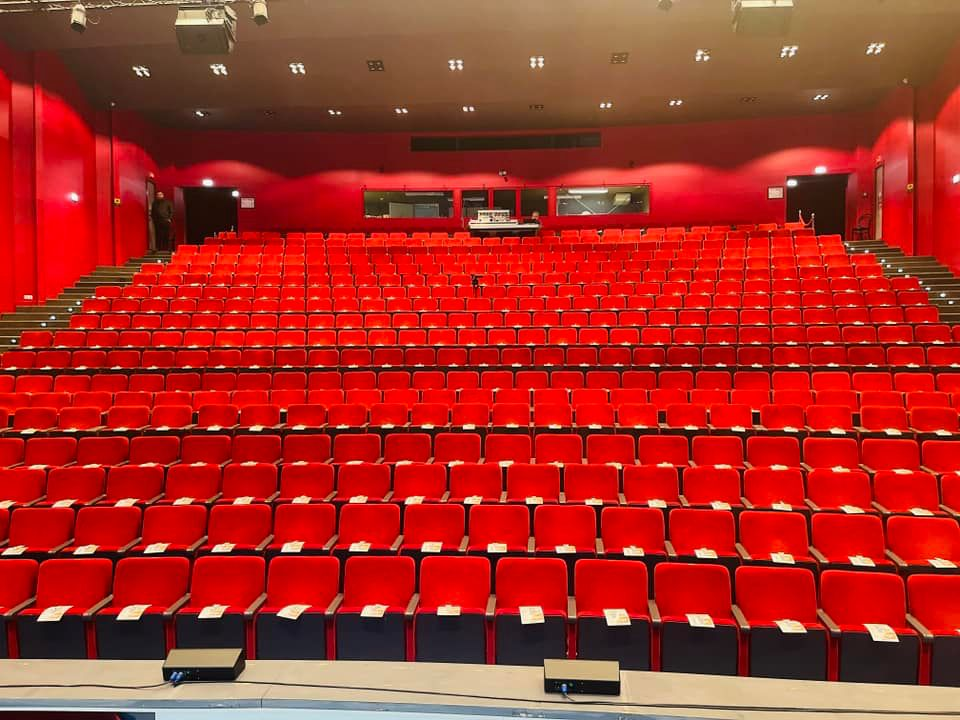
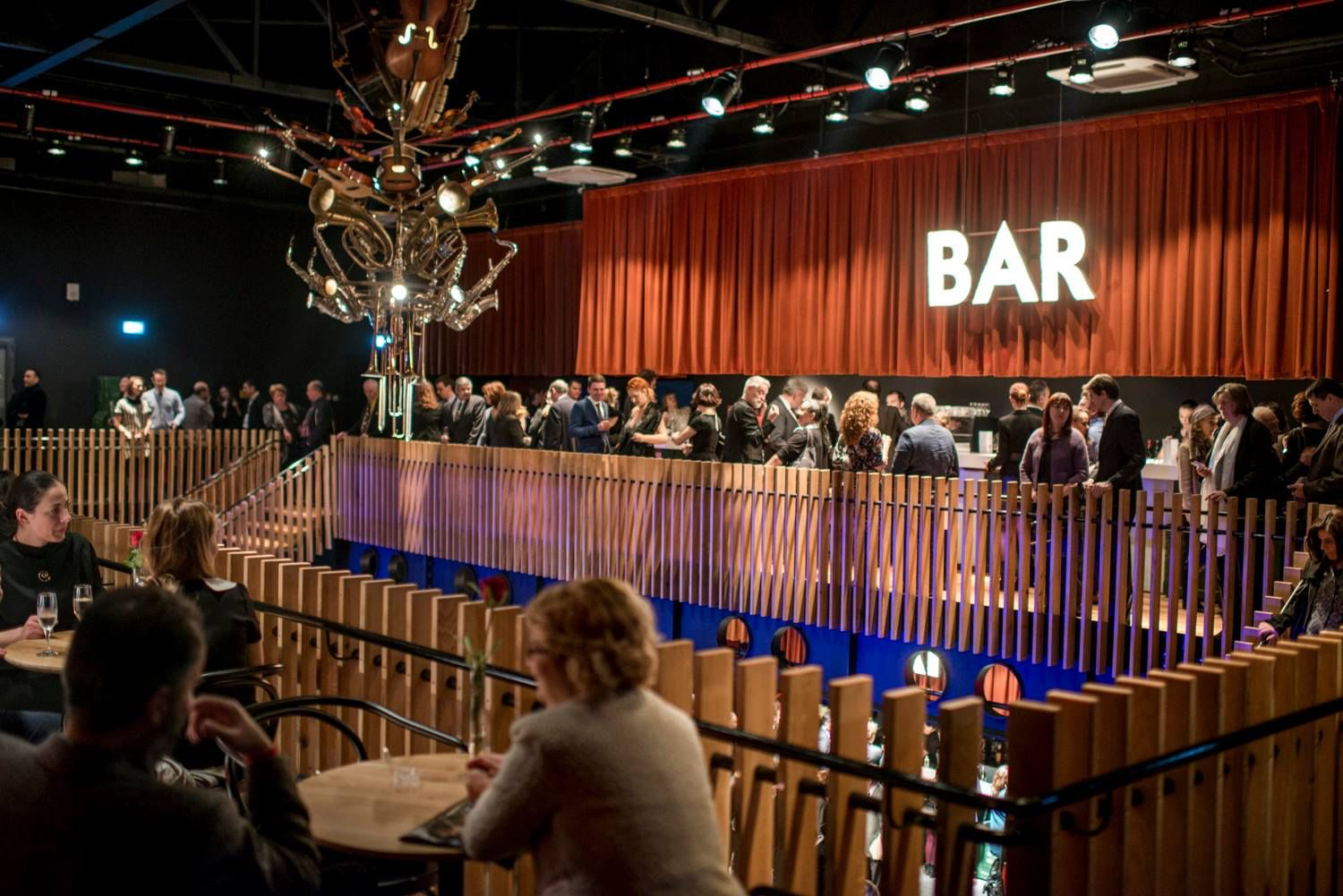
Ion Dacian Operetta Theatre – interiors

On January 3, 2005, a fire partially destroyed the auditorium housing the National Operetta Theatre, along with its annexes, at the National Theatre Bucharest (TNB). The press then exposed the fragility, unpreparedness, and inadequacy of fire protection systems in all cultural venues across the capital. The troupe, led by Amza Săceanu (since 1998), who had hoped to reuse the venue quickly, found itself without a theatre, costumes, or sets. A long period of temporary venues and national tours then began, which would not end until 2016. In 2008, after waiting three years for the Omnia hall of the Ministry of Interior to be prepared, as had been announced in September 2005, the troupe was finally accommodated in the TNB's Studio hall, which had been rebuilt after the fire that struck it at the end of 2005. But it had to leave in 2012 due to a major renovation program at the TNB. The National Operetta Theatre therefore embarked on a national tour in 2012–2013, while awaiting a permanent venue dedicated to operetta and musical performances, the construction of which had been announced in 2012. Between 2013 and 2015, the Palatul Național al Copiilor (National Children's Palace) in Bucharest hosted the Operetta Theatre.

At the same time, several internal conflicts and disputes contributed to weakening the theatre. As early as 2007, the artists and their union complained about the new Studio hall and its acoustics, the new management, and also their salaries. In September 2013, the government unilaterally decided to merge the Bucharest National Opera with the National Operetta Theatre. The decision was very poorly received by the artists, and legal action was even taken to request a suspension of this decision.

After delays in the renovation of the Omnia hall, initially planned to host the Operetta Theatre, and faced with an unstable situation—or even the impossibility of performing at certain times—it was decided to construct a new building for the theatre. The decision was announced on September 18, 2012, by director Răzvan-Ioan Dincă and the minister of culture at a press conference. The new home for the Operetta was scheduled for autumn 2013 with a budget of 11 million euros. It was planned to have a steel frame structure and cover approximately 3,400 m^{2} over three levels. Several technical challenges had to be addressed, in particular the height and depth of the auditorium, which required perfect acoustics, the tall glazed main façade, and cantilevered structural elements.

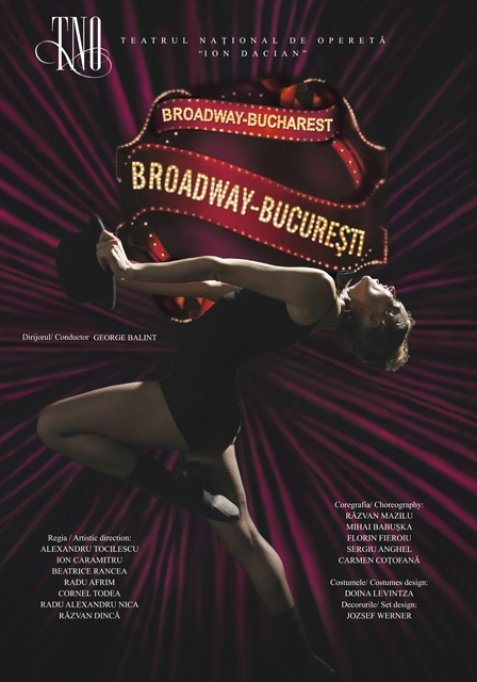
Broadway București, 2014

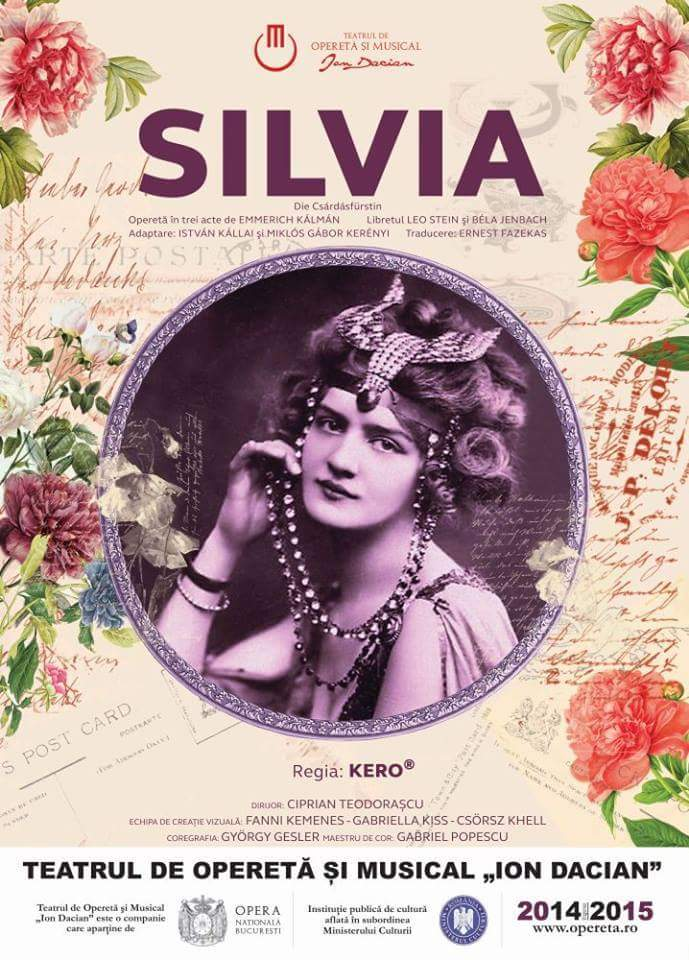
Silvia, 2015

This is the first modern venue in Romania dedicated to musical performances since 1989, with a seating capacity of 550, offering excellent sightlines for every spectator and equipped with stage machinery suitable for musicals. It features a large stage measuring 14 meters wide by 20 meters deep, a choir and ballet rehearsal room, an orchestra rehearsal space, an orchestra pit, and a spacious foyer accommodating 100 to 150 people. The building also includes individual rehearsal booths for musicians, a costume storage area, a shoemaking workshop, a sewing workshop, a sheet music repository, as well as several public service areas and ancillary spaces. According to architect Cristian Mihu, the building possesses architectural qualities but is not located where it should be for an artistic center of this significance. Its distance from Bucharest's old city center, in a district entirely demolished in the 1980s and punctuated by buildings with pronounced volumes that clash with one another, is regrettable. Furthermore, this type of public building should have been subject to an architectural competition, which would have allowed for useful debates and addressed several unresolved urban planning issues.

The new Teatrul Național de Operetă și Musical Ion Dacian was inaugurated on 24 January 2015 with the premiere of Fantoma de la Opera (The Phantom of the Opera). The anniversary event on 8 November 2015, celebrating the theatre's 65th year was among the last performances before an administrative closure in November 2015. Due to several factors—including lack of formal reception and operational approval, electrical safety issues, and a land dispute on the site of the building,the theatre remained closed for several years. and reopens in April 2018. An issue of insufficient acoustics, noted during the first performance in 2015, has not been resolved to date, so singers are required to wear lavalier microphones to amplify their voices.

The artistic direction initiated by Răzvan-Ioan Dincă was continued by Alina Moldovan from 2013 to 2015. The repertoire presented in the 2012–2013 and 2013–2014 seasons was particularly extensive:

- Musicals: Rebecca by Sylvester Levay, Romanian creations such as Broadway-Bucureşti (a reference Romanian premiere), Supermarket, and Paris, mon amour, a foyer production that met with great success and was performed throughout Romania for several years, not forgetting Romeo și Julieta by Gérard Presgurvic, first performed in 2009 (premiered in Paris in 2001).

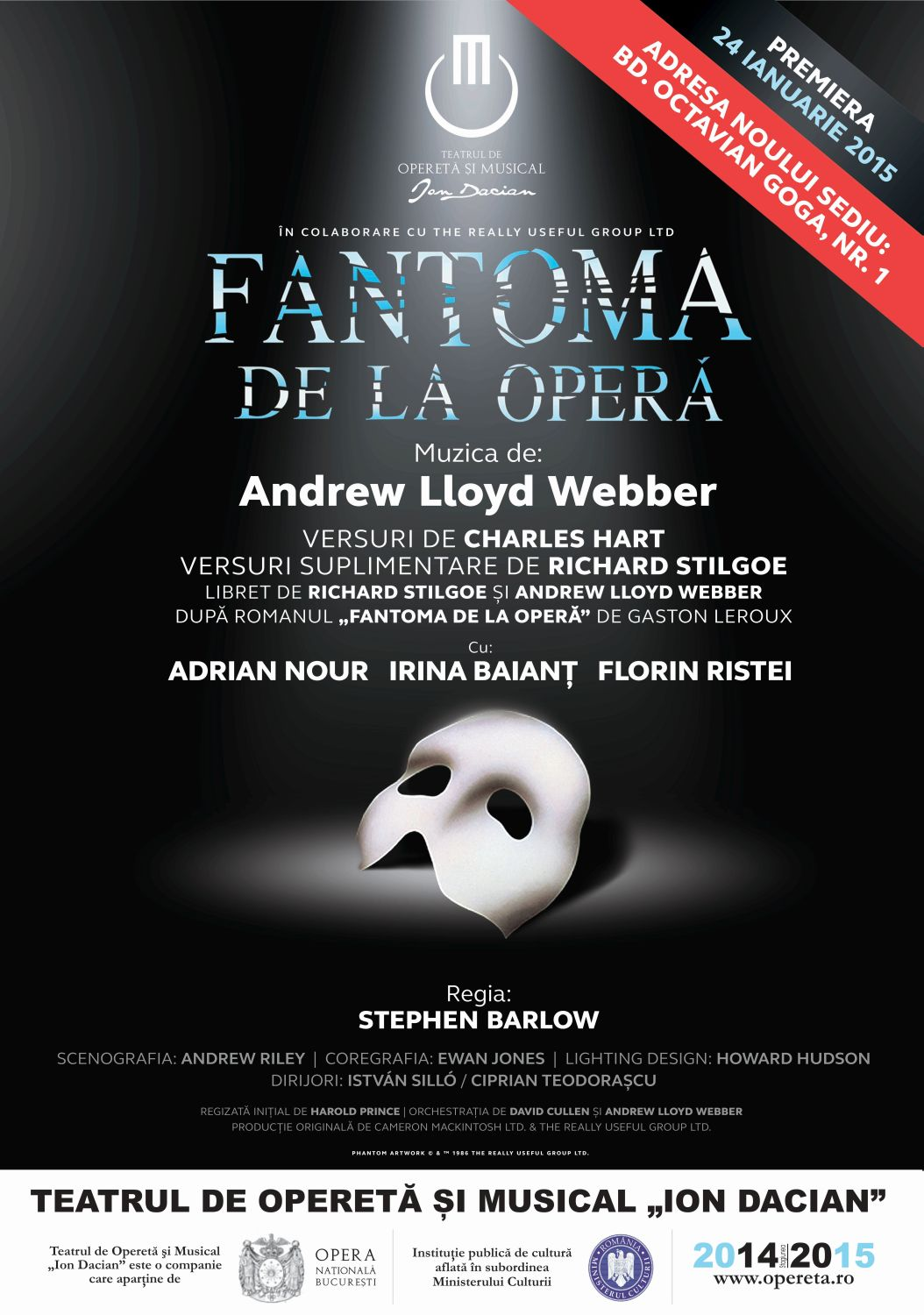
Fantoma de la Opera, 2015

- Operettas: Liliacul (Die Fledermaus), Silvia (Die Csárdásfürstin), Voievodul țiganilor (Der Zigeunerbaron), Contesa Maritza (Gräfin Mariza), and Văduva veselă (The Merry Widow).
- Dance theatre: María de Buenos Aires an operita tango by Astor Piazzolla (Premiere in 2011), Royal Fashion and Urban Kiss, works created by the theatre.
- Concerts and events: Festivalul Internațional al Artelor Spectacolului Muzical – Viața e frumoasă! 5th edition (2012) and 6th edition (2013); 2012/2013 national tour opening in Constanța on 22 September with Contesa Maritza (Gräfin Mariza) and continuing throughout the country, including Timișoara, Brașov, Sibiu, Târgu Mureș, and Craiova; Festivalul Zilele Monteorului in July 2012 and 2013, in Sărata Monteoru (Buzău County); Zilele Culturii Româno-Maghiare – Aiud, 6–8 July 2012; Gala Internațională de Operetă și Musical in Kyiv on 31 March 2012; Concert de Primăvară (Spring Concert: arias and duets from the international repertoire); Invitație la Vals; Concert de romanțe in 2014.
- Magic shows and children's performances: Kids Magic Show, HAZARD, Cocoșelul Neascultător (The Disobedient Rooster), Frumoasa din pădurea adormită (Sleeping Beauty), and Micuța Dorothy (Little Dorothy), composed by Marius Țeicu, an interactive performance for children from special education units and disadvantaged backgrounds in December 2013.

The main productions presented during the 2014–2015 season continued the programming direction established in the previous two seasons: for operettas – Contesa Maritza (Gräfin Mariza), Liliacul (Die Fledermaus), Silvia (The Riviera Girl and The Gipsy Princess), Văduva veselă (The Merry Widow), Voievodul țiganilor (Der Zigeunerbaron); for musicals – Dolce Vita, Fantoma de la Operă (The Phantom of the Opera), Paris, Mon Amour, Rebecca, Romeo și Julieta (Roméo et Juliette, from Hatred to Love) by Gérard Presgurvic; for dance theatre – Anais, María de Buenos Aires; as well as galas, recitals, medleys, and a few operettas for children: Cocoșelul Neascultător (The Disobedient Rooster) and Frumoasa din pădurea adormită (Sleeping Beauty).

Scenes from the inaugural performance at the new Bucharest Operetta Theatre, 24 January 2015

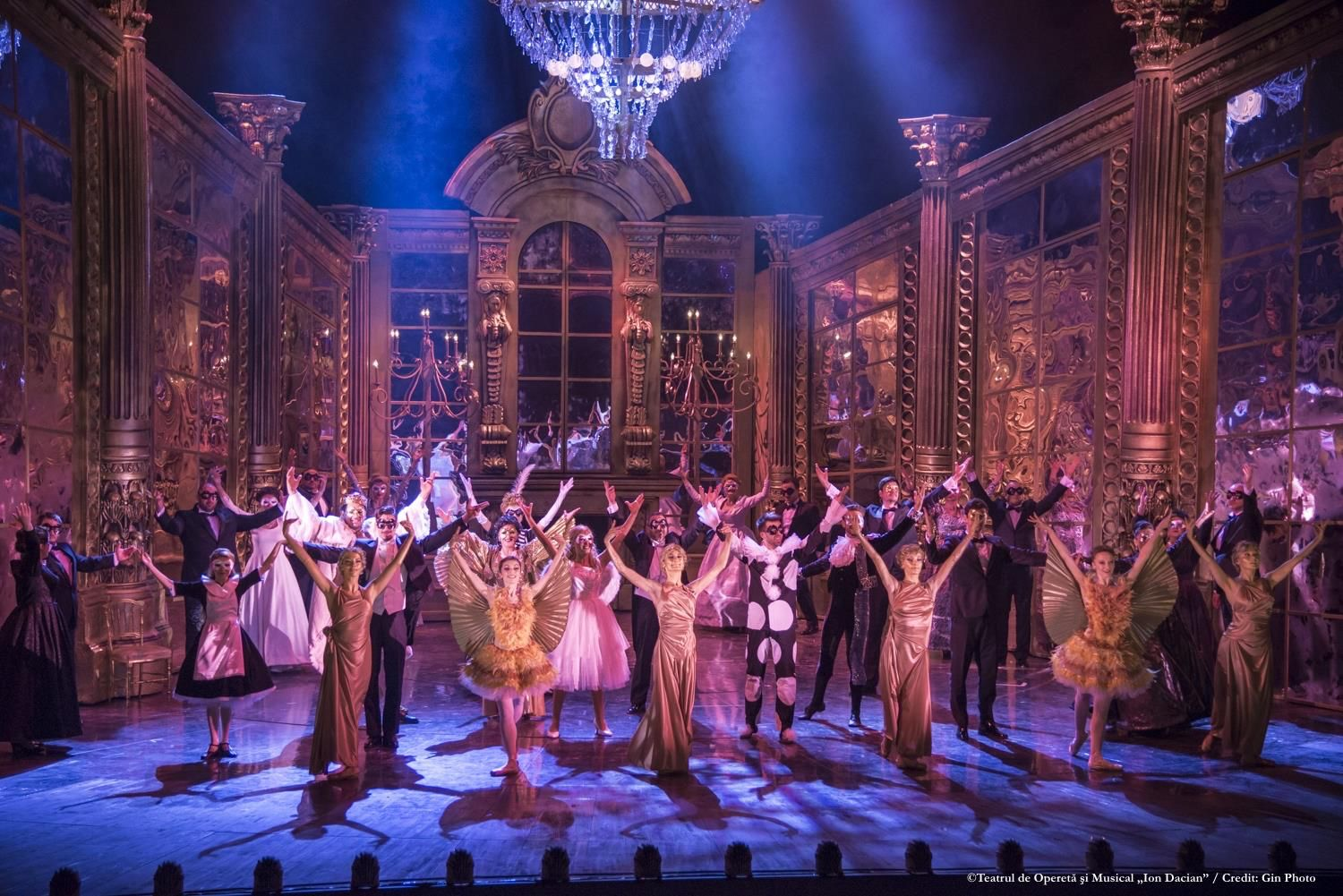

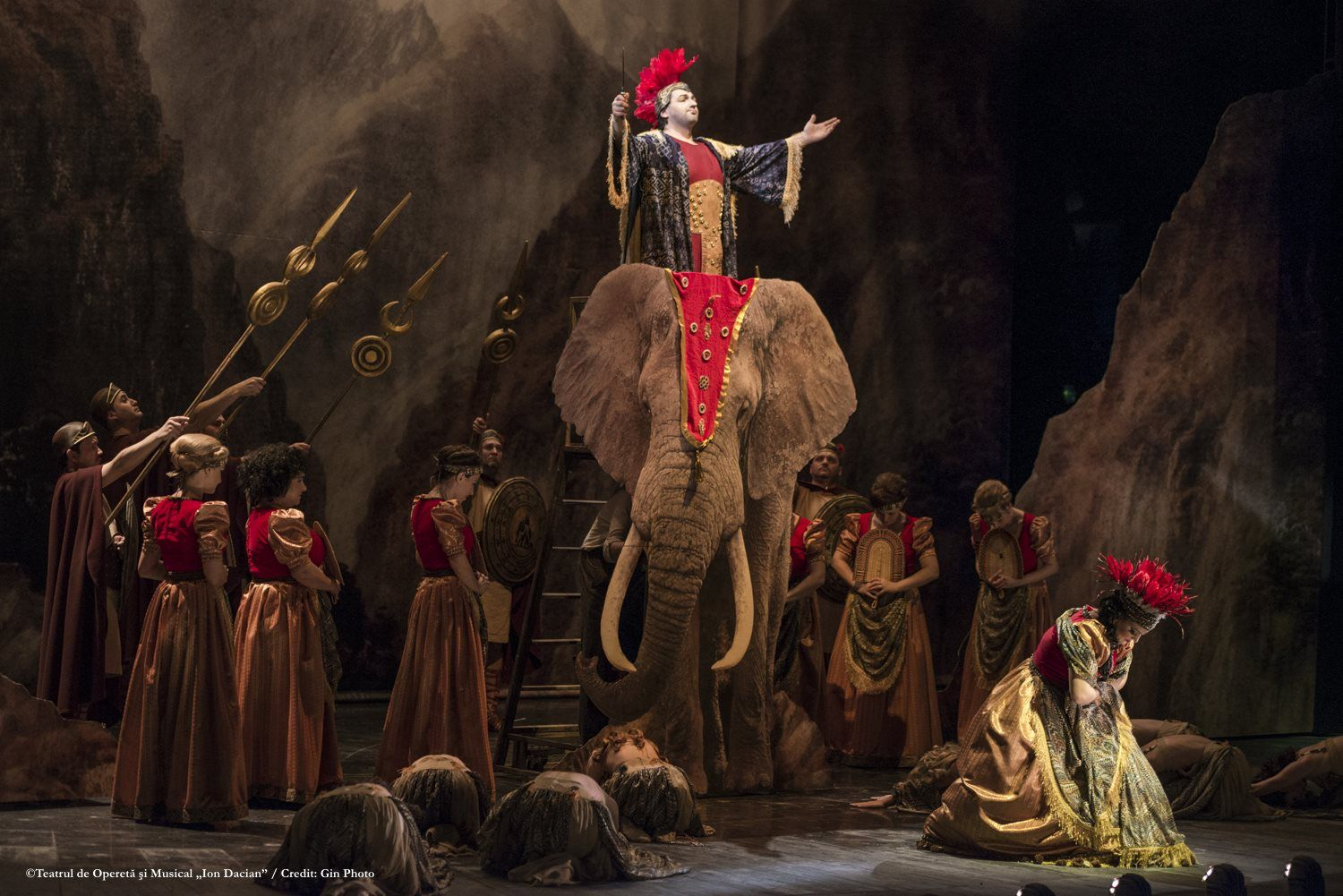

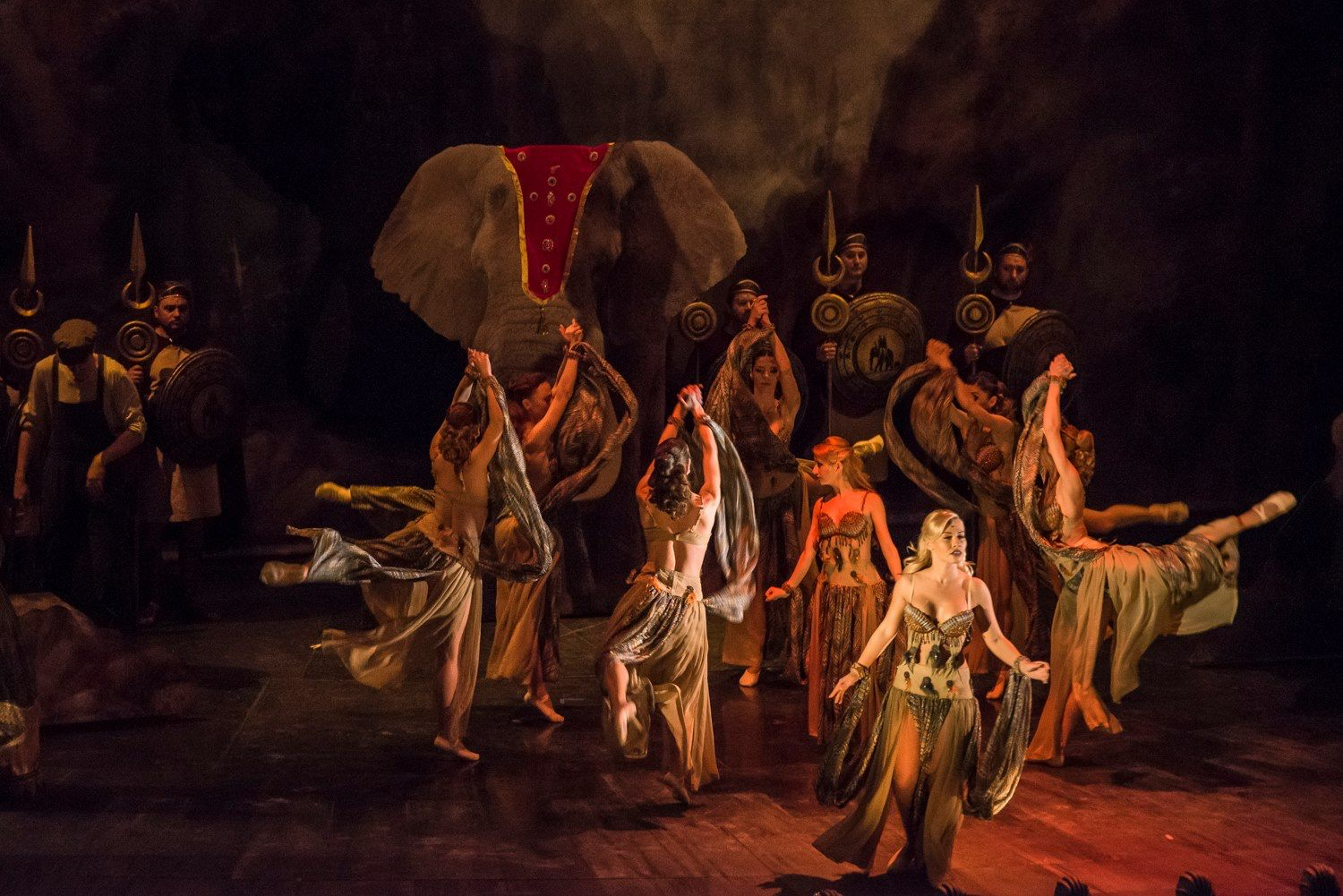

=== A chaotic institution in slow motion: 2015–2022 ===
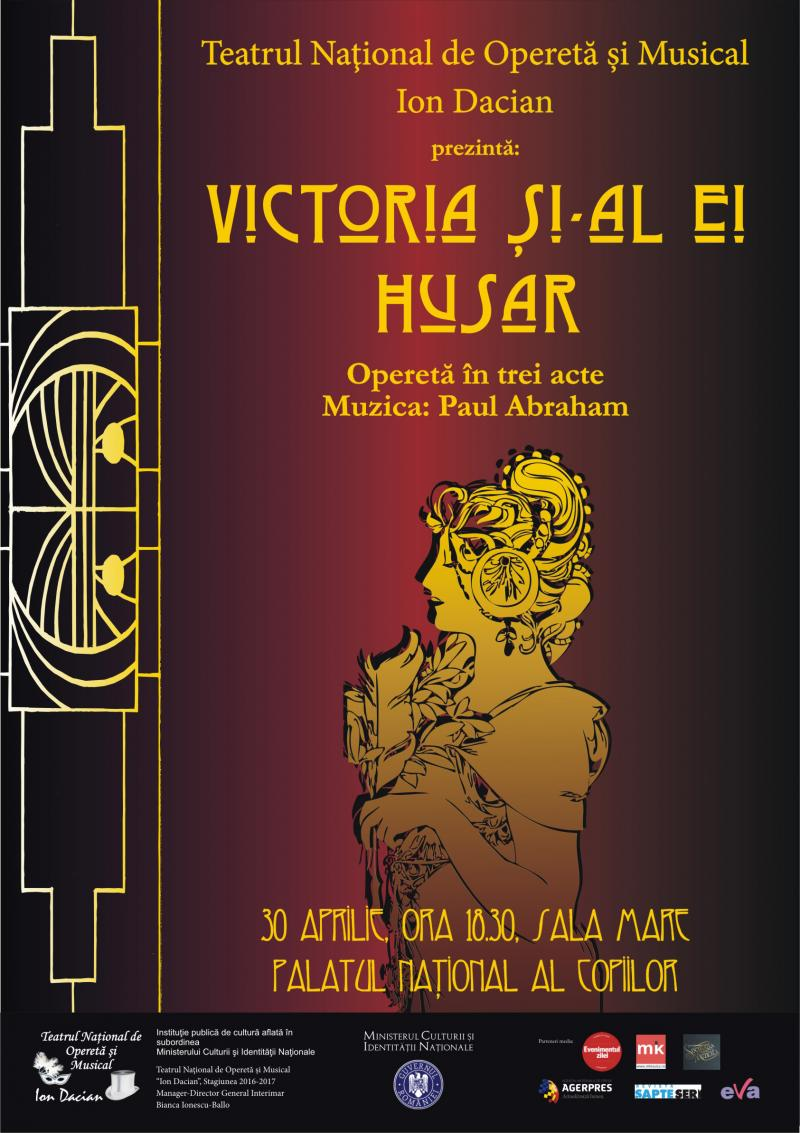
Victoria și al ei husar, 2017

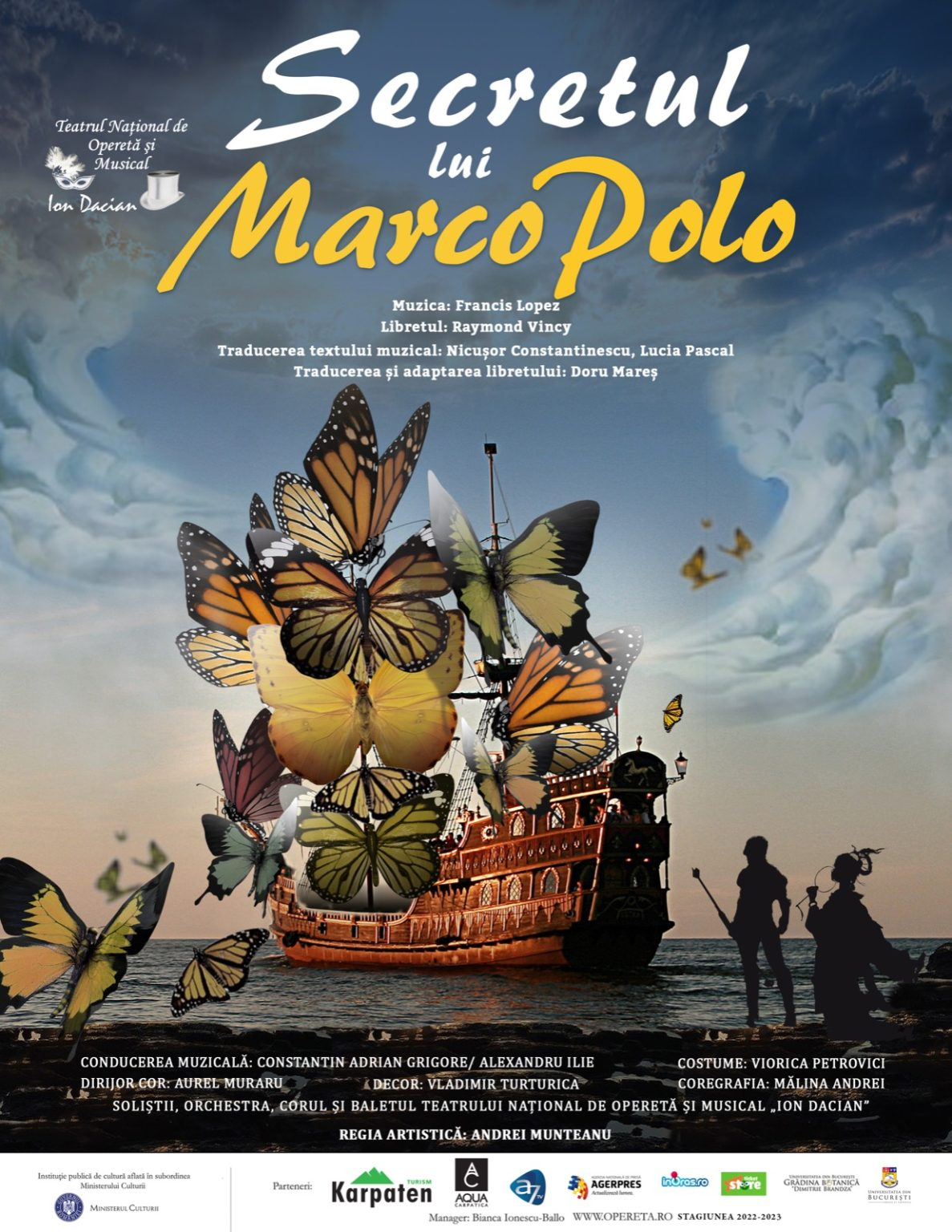
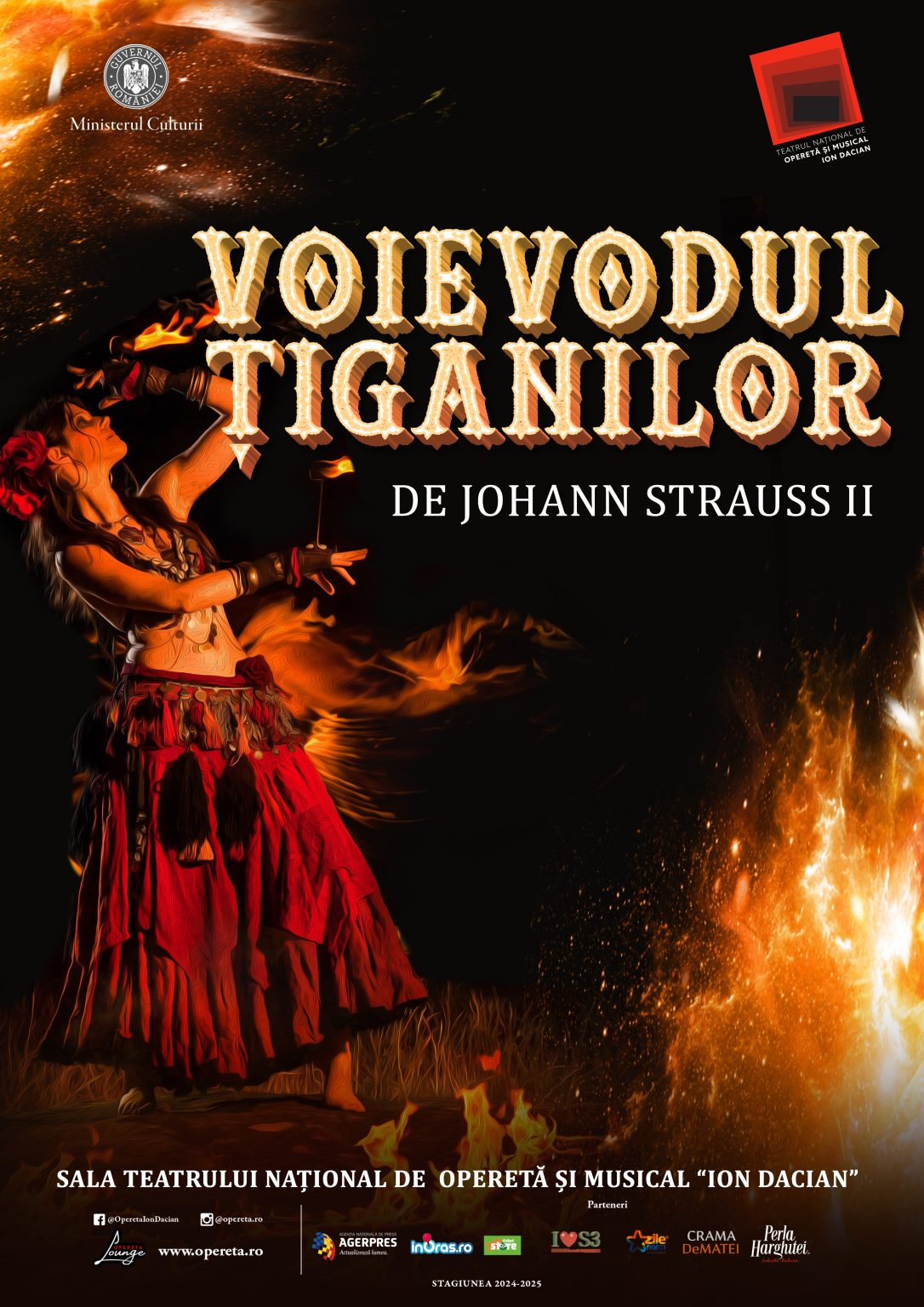
Productions of the 2022–2023 season

The suspension by the Ministry of Culture in 2015 of Alina Moldovan's mandate, due to an incomplete asset declaration, brought the new direction launched in 2006 to a halt. Cleared of wrongdoing and returning to the head of the theatre three years later, Alina Moldovan, noting the dismantling of everything that had been put in place over 13 years, resigned one week after her reinstatement, in 2018. The highly popular festival Viața e frumoasă! disappeared in 2017, apparently to be replaced by another event, the Ion Dacian Festival.

The Festivalului Internațional al Artelor Spectacolului Muzical "Viața e frumoasă!" was discontinued by decision of the interim director Bianca Ionescu-Ballo, and replaced by the "Ion Dacian" Festival, an event that received no real coverage in the press and suggests a minor undertaking, and lacks the scope and prominence of Viața e frumoasă!.

Moreover, the merger between the Bucharest National Opera and the National Operetta Theatre proved to be a forced and unsuccessful union, yielding no tangible results. A new government subsequently reverted to the previous arrangement, and the Bucharest Operetta Theatre regained its independence in November 2016.

The continual "waltz" of directors also contributed to the profound disorder that shook the theatre. Between 2015 and 2023, seven successive management teams took office against a backdrop of internal protests, judicial affairs, unexplained abrupt resignations, ministerial incompetence, and also as a consequence of the incessant scandals and internal power struggles at the Bucharest National Opera, the parent institution of the National Operetta Theatre from 2013 to 2016.

Finally, once the separation long demanded by the artists was implemented, a complete lack of results became evident, both in the use of public funds and in artistic performances, continuing to tarnish the institution's image, which was poorly managed by its supervisory ministry and its own administration. Between 2017 and 2018, the theatre was temporarily housed at the Palatul Național al Copiilor. The results for 2017 and 2018 were disastrous, as shown by the performance indicators published in the management project objectives booklet for 2018 (won by Bianca Ionescu-Ballo) The 2016–2018 period resembled more a leave period, punctuated by rare days of activity for the artists, given the very small number of performances staged: none in 2016, 27 in 2017, and 36 in 2018. This means that less than one performance per week was staged, even in the best year, 2018. This abnormal situation is explained by the combination of yet another relocation, the chaos at the Bucharest National Opera in 2016, and the change in status of TNOMID, which regained its legal independence in November 2016, but only effectively during 2017.

For the 2015–2016 season, the stage presented Fantoma de la Operă (The Phantom of the Opera), Romeo și Julieta (Romeo and Juliet: From Hatred to Love) by Gérard Presgurvic, Silvia (The Riviera Girl and The Gipsy Princess) by Emmerich Kálmán, Dolce Vita, and Anais.

The 2016–2017 season was truncated for 2016, characterized by a resounding void, then in 2017 featured Victoria și al ei husar (Viktoria und ihr Husar) by Paul Abraham, Liliacul (Die Fledermaus), the musical London – A New Story (by Bianca Ionescu-Ballo), and Bonjour, bonne nuit Paris! originally titled Paris, Mon Amour, an original foyer production conceived and created by Răzvan-Ioan Dincă in 2010, but heavily modified by Bianca Ionescu-Ballo, becoming a heterogeneous collage.

Between 2018 and 2023, in addition to the numerous medleys offered, the classic operetta productions Țara surâsului (Das Land des Lächelns), Voievodul țiganilor (Der Zigeunerbaron), Victoria și-al ei husar (Viktoria und ihr Husar), Liliacul (Die Fledermaus), Candide (operetta), and Secretul lui Marco Polo (The Secret of Marco Polo) were staged almost every year. On the musical theatre side, audiences could see My Fair Lady, Kiss Me, Kate, Jack, între dragoste și nebunie, a theatre creation, and Rebecca, along with several short ballets and children's operettas: Frumoasa din pădurea adormită (Sleeping Beauty), Cenușăreasa (Cinderella), Alice în Țara Minunilor (Alice in Wonderland), and Ileana cea vitează (Ileana the Brave), a Romanian creation.

== Leadership of the National Operetta Theatre since 1990 ==
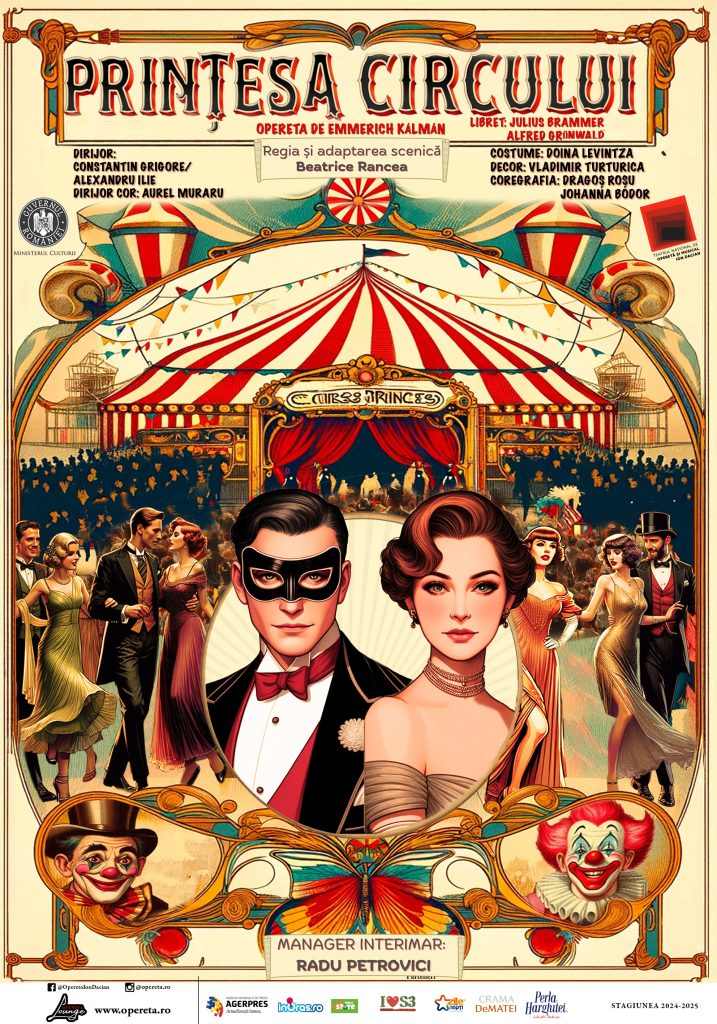
Prințesa circului, 2024

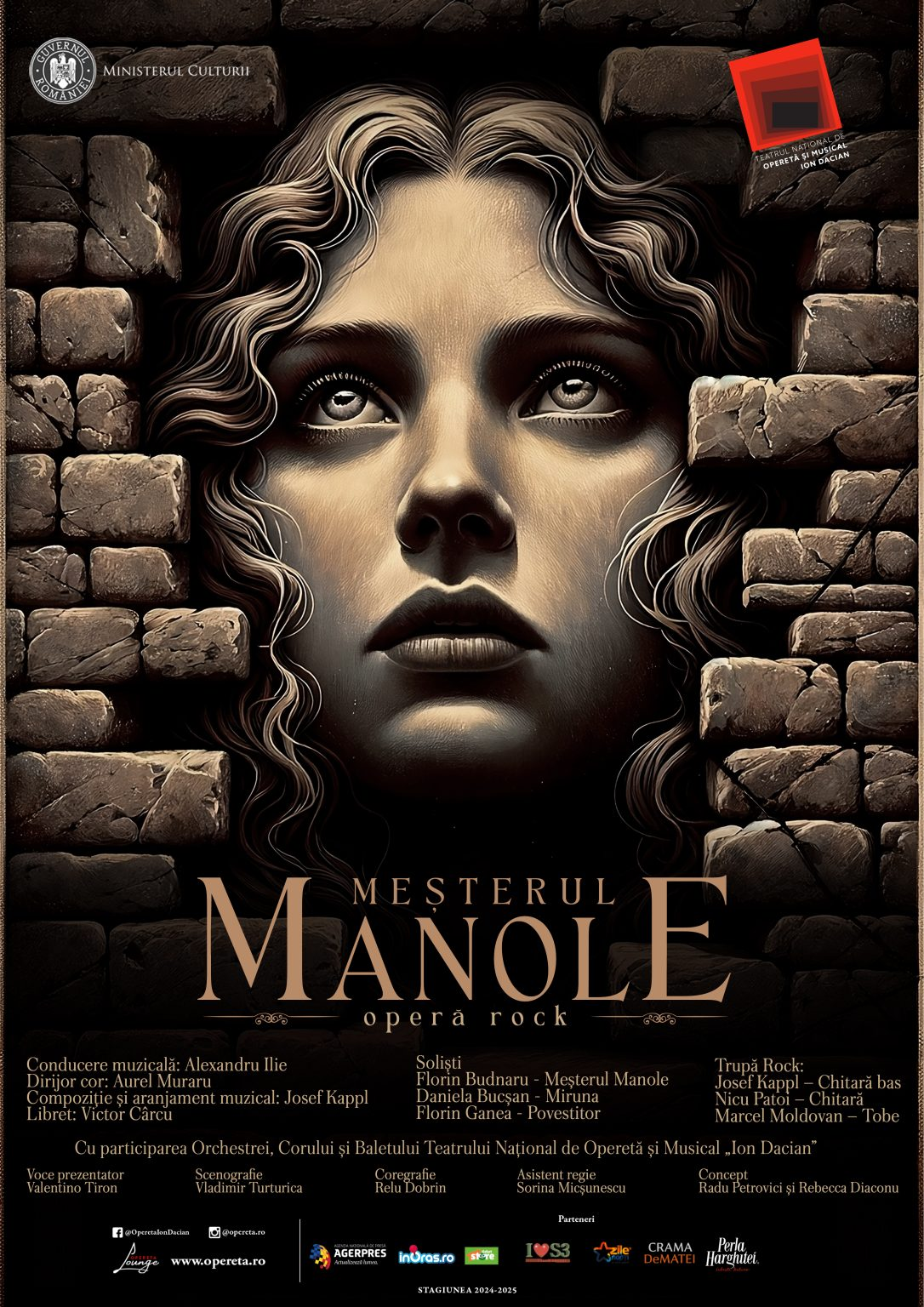
Meșterul Manole, 2024

Périod	Director
1990–1992	Sorana Coroamă-Stanca
1992–1994	Nicolae Ciubuc
1994–1999	Dorin Teodorescu
2001–2006	Amza Săceanu
2006–2012	Răzvan-Ioan Dincă
2013–2015	Alina Moldovan
In September 2013, the Operetta Theatre came under the authority of the Bucharest National Opera. -
2015–2016	George Călin
2016 (less than a week in early April)	Tiberiu Soare
2016 (8–19 April)	Vladimir Vlad Conta
2016 (May)	Beatrice Rancea
2016–2018	Bianca Ionescu-Ballo (interim)
In November 2016, the Operetta Theatre regained its independence.
2018 (one week)	Alina Moldovan
2018–2023 (November)	Bianca Ionescu-Ballo (five-year term)
2023 (November) – 2024 (December)	Radu Petrovici (interim)
2025–2029	Radu Petrovici (five-year term)

== Status of the Ion Dacian Theatre at the end of 2024 ==
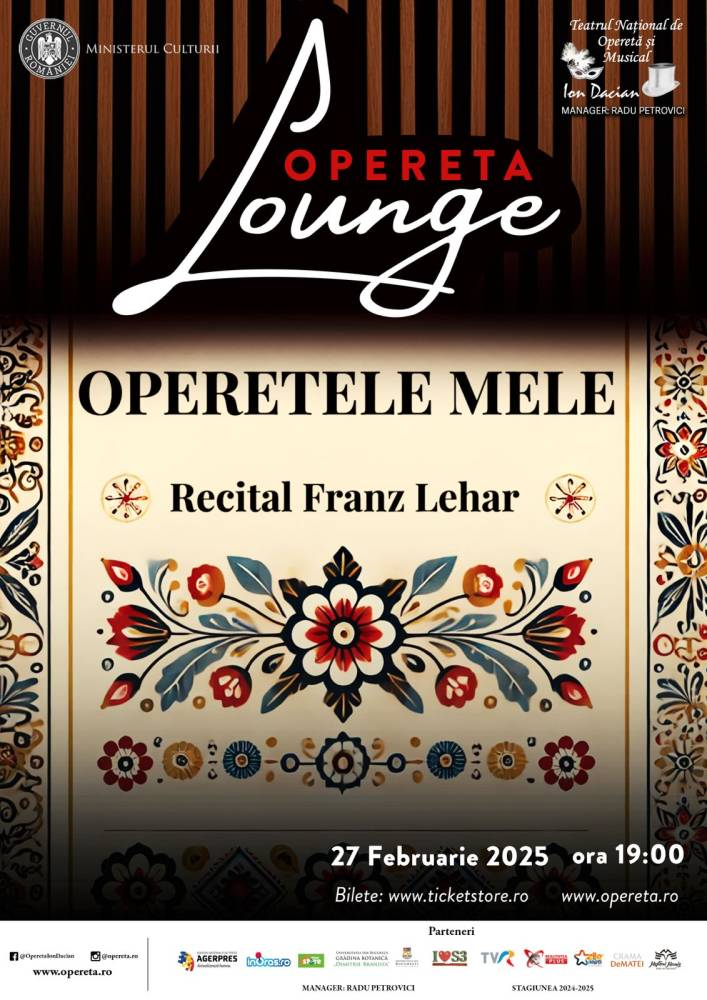
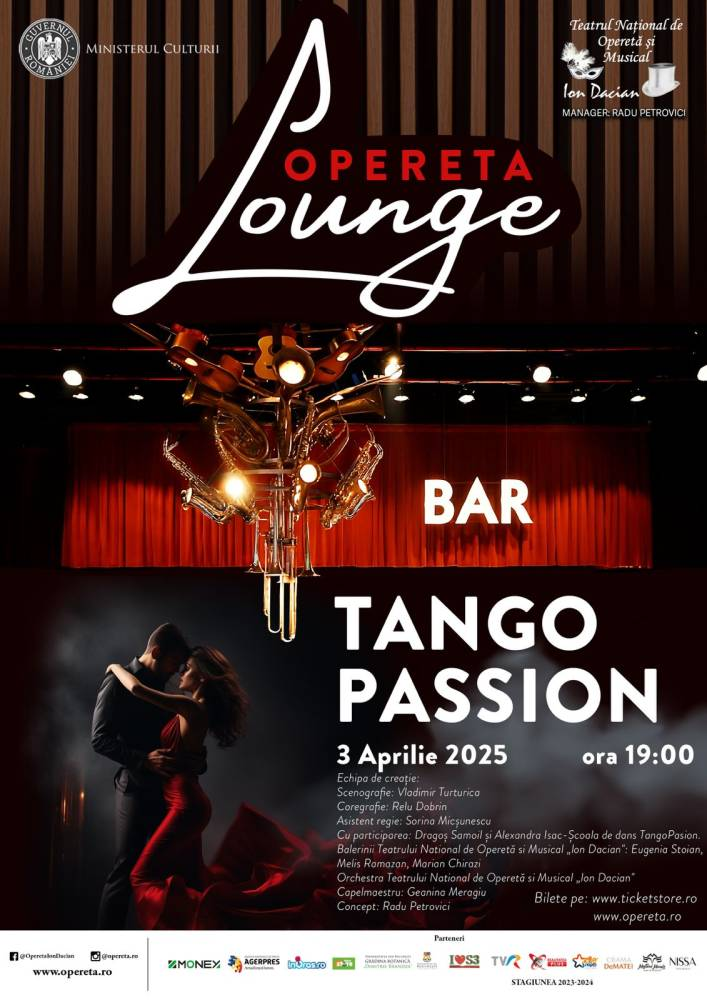
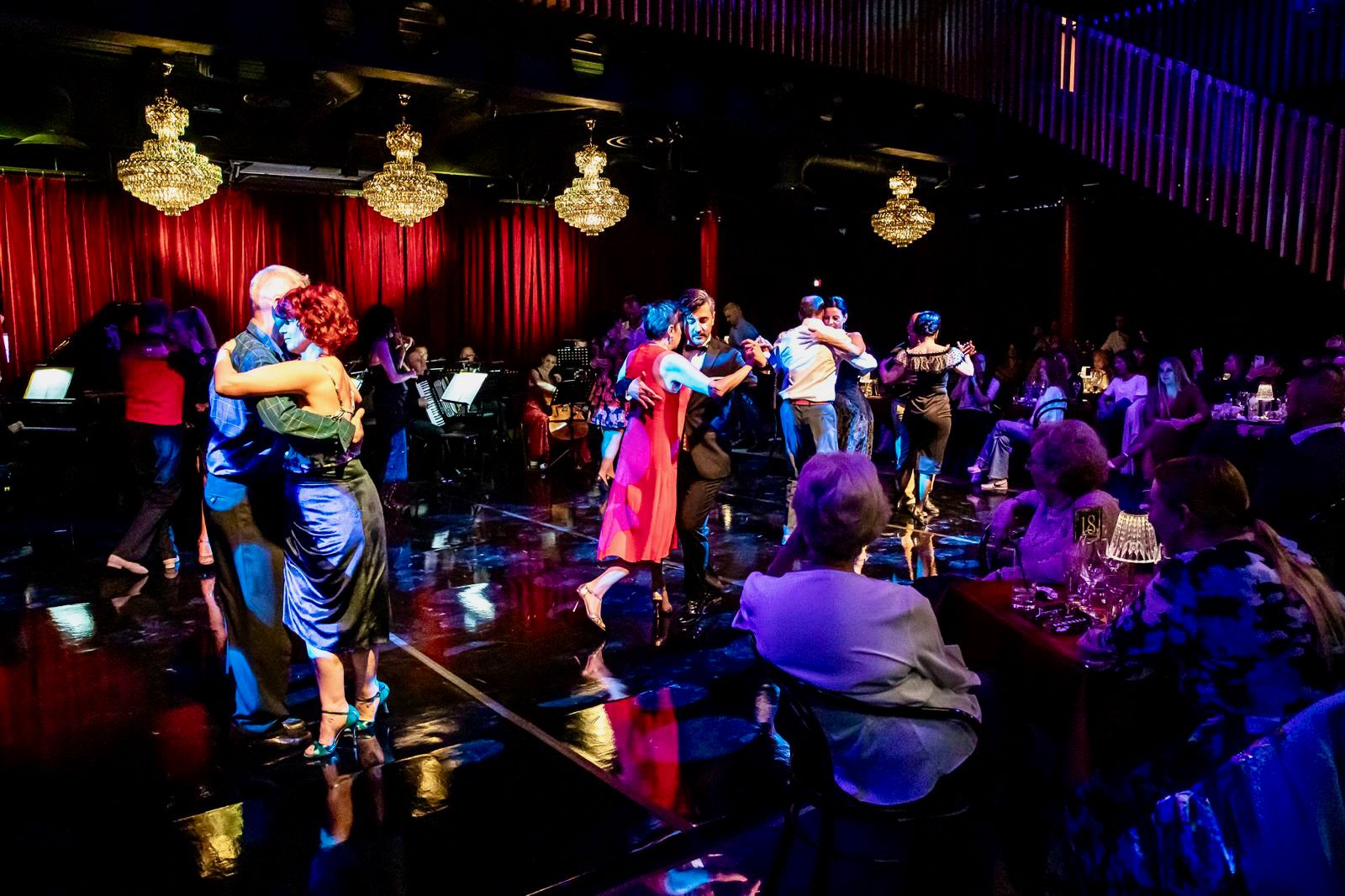
Opereta Lounge of the Ion Dacian Theatre

The information in this chapter is sourced from the activity reports published on the website of the Romanian Ministry of Culture, the target booklets for the 2018 and 2014 management project competitions, as well as the management project for the 2024 competition for the institution's directorship.

The 2023–2024 season, under the direction of the new interim director Radu Petrovici, is distinguished by a narrowing of major productions: Meșterul Manole, based on a rock opera project by the band Phoenix, and Prințesa circului (Die Zirkusprinzessin) by Emmerich Kálmán.

=== The audience and its reception ===
The theatrical season generally runs from October to June of the following year.

The institution conducted audience surveys in order to monitor changes in the current audience profile during the 2021–2023 period. These surveys were complemented by statistics provided by the Facebook page. Despite incomplete results whose consistency could be improved, the theatre's audience has evolved, and clear trends have been identified:

- The 20–26 age group shows steady growth, increasing from 13.33% in 2021 to 23.50% in 2023, offsetting the decline in the senior audience (over 60), which fell from 18.88% in 2021 to 9.13% in 2023;
- One of the main reasons cited for declining attendance is the perceived lack of quality of performances, with the proportion of such feedback steadily increasing from 24.44% in 2021 to 33.33% in 2023;
- Audience preferences at the TNOMID are strongly oriented toward musical theatre, with an average of 31.52% over the 2021–2023 period, followed by operetta at 24.19%;
- Opera is an increasingly appreciated musical genre among audiences, with an average of 14.17%, rising from 14.18% in 2021 to 18.03% in 2023.

In 2025, the largest audience category falls within the age segment up to 35 (43.71%), with the revitalization of the institution attracting a significant share of new audiences, accounting for 30.13% of first-time spectators. On the other hand, the average rating awarded by the audience is 9.65/10.

=== Image and communication ===
Considered outdated and lacking originality, the visual identity was replaced in March 2025. The new logo represents a minimalist metaphor of the theatre building's volume.

As regards communication, the main public presence remains the social network Facebook. The website, undergoing reconfiguration since February 2025, reflects a shift in vision, highlighting information useful to audiences, namely the list of upcoming performances, accompanied by links to online ticketing agencies.

=== Artists and quality of performances ===
The quality of productions left much to be desired during the chaotic years (2016–2019), and the so-called "potpourris" (combinations of excerpts from several works), used to fill the gaps of an insufficient programme, persisted until the 2022–2023 season. Thus, during the 2021–2023 period, many premieres failed to meet with success. Productions included Candide, Leonard Bernstein's famous operetta; My Fair Lady, staged by the late Ion Caramitru; Der Zigeunerbaron and The Secret of Marco Polo, titles from the great operetta repertoire; a musical comedy premiere in 2022, Jack, între dragoste și nebunie (Jack, Between Love and Madness) by Diego Mecchi; and several ballet and contemporary dance premieres (Le Vitrail d'une vie, Alice in Wonderland, etc.), as well as revivals of older productions (for example Rebecca, Butterflies), without attracting audiences. The proliferation of numerous "collage"-type performances or potpourris, assembling fragments from various operettas or musicals, served to offset the failure of certain newly produced premieres at the lowest possible cost. The Candide production was thus withdrawn very quickly after its second performance, cut short by the pandemic, and the other premieres did not exceed, on average, 1.5 performances over three years.

The appointment of a new interim director in 2024, Radu Petrovici, was marked by a musical production based on an original Romanian composition, Meșterul Manole, which proved to be a major success and played to sold-out audiences, followed by a national tour. The programmes offered for the second half of 2024 drew on the existing stock of productions, presenting the most accomplished works.

=== Fragile finances, currently undergoing recovery ===
The period preceding the institution's definitive move into its new theatre (April 2018) was heavily affected by instability, both in terms of independence, organization, and the ability to have access to a performance venue.

As a result, the performance during the first two years (2017, 2018) in the new building was very poor, and the cost per audience member was unreasonably high: 4,300 lei (approximately 924 euros), twice the cost per ticket at the Metropolitan Opera in New York. Ticket sales peaked at 4,600 tickets sold for the entire 2017 season, which featured only 12 productions and 27 performances. The manager's priority during his first official mandate (2018–2023) was to save the institution. By 2023, more than 30,000 paying spectators attended 77 performances. The cost per audience member dropped to around 1,000 lei (approximately 202 euros), a level closer to normal. Nevertheless, the theatre's financial situation remains precarious.

The recently re-established institution (in 2016) failed to retain the performance rights for the musical The Phantom of the Opera, despite the very successful 2015 run. The title was therefore removed from the repertoire, without having been financially amortized, and at the height of its success.

In 2025, the financial recovery was remarkable, with the theatre's own revenues reaching a historic high of 4 million lei, an increase of 78% compared to 2023, in the context of the lowest level of public funding recorded between 2017 and 2025.

== The 2025–2029 Plan ==
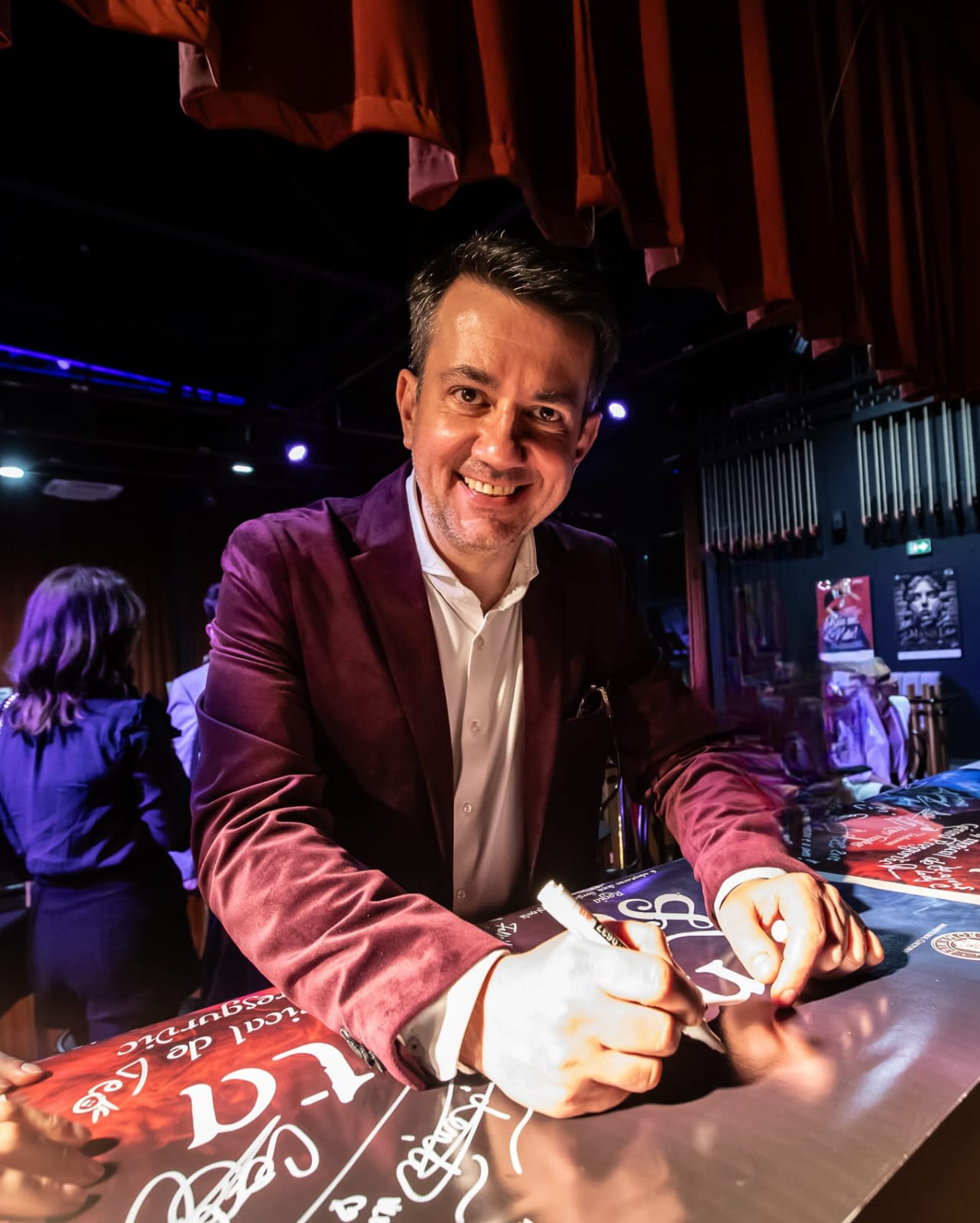
Radu Petrovici, General Director in 2025

The information in this chapter is sourced from the 2024–2029 management plan.

According to Radu Petrovici, the new director of the institution since 2025:

Operetta is not opera's poor cousin, and musical theatre is not a vulgarization of operetta; rather, they are the younger, more joyful sisters of theatre, opera, and classical music. They are the soul of a celebration set to refined and complex music. Operetta and musical theatre, alongside opera and classical music, are important for Romania because they attest to and certify its European identity culturally.

=== Strategy and artistic policy 2025–2029 ===
According to the management plan of the "Ion Dacian" National Theatre of Operetta and Musical Comedy for the 2024–2029 period, TNOMID benefits from a loyal audience, devoted to musical performances. Surveys conducted in recent years emphasize the need for interventions in the theatre's programming on several levels: reducing gala-type events, collages, or concerts; focusing on improving the quality of existing and upcoming productions; and exploring other musical genres, such as opera-comique (singspiel) and musical theatre.

A new type of performance-event was launched in 2024: the Operetta Lounge, or "Operetta Salon," which consists of using the theatre foyer as an open stage for the audience, eliminating the natural separation between stage and spectators and encouraging interaction between the two. Programs circulate among the audience and movement is fluid. The lounge hosts live concerts, classical music recitals, art exhibitions, and evenings of dance, reading, or poetry.

As stated by the theatre management, TNOMID seeks both to enhance the profitability of productions through multiple performances of the same title and to highlight contemporary musical theatre. Greater artistic quality is also pursued, supported by the persistence of titles on the repertoire, which enables additional rehearsal opportunities.

The 2024–2025 season's programming includes an equal number of musicals: Romeo și Julieta (Romeo and Juliet, from Hatred to Love), which was well received by critics and whose success allowed the number of performances to be extended to 20 between March and June 2025, My Fair Lady, Meșterul Manole, Jack, între dragoste și nebunie (Jack, Between Love and Madness) by Diego Mecchi, and Rebecca; and operettas: Voievodul Țiganilor (Der Zigeunerbaron), Liliacul (Die Fledermaus), Prințesa Circului (Die Zirkusprinzessin), Victoria și-al ei husar (Viktoria und ihr Husar), and Țara surâsului (Das Land des Lächelns).

In addition to these two genres, the season includes Operetta Lounges: Operetele mele – Recital Emmerich Kálmán, potpourris such as Musical Evolution and Bonjour, bonne nuit, Paris, a ballet (Fluturi), a Christmas show (Joyful Christmas), and a lyrical tragedy: Vocea Umană (La Voix humaine) by Francis Poulenc with text by Jean Cocteau

Lyrical Drama and Musicals – 2024–2025 season

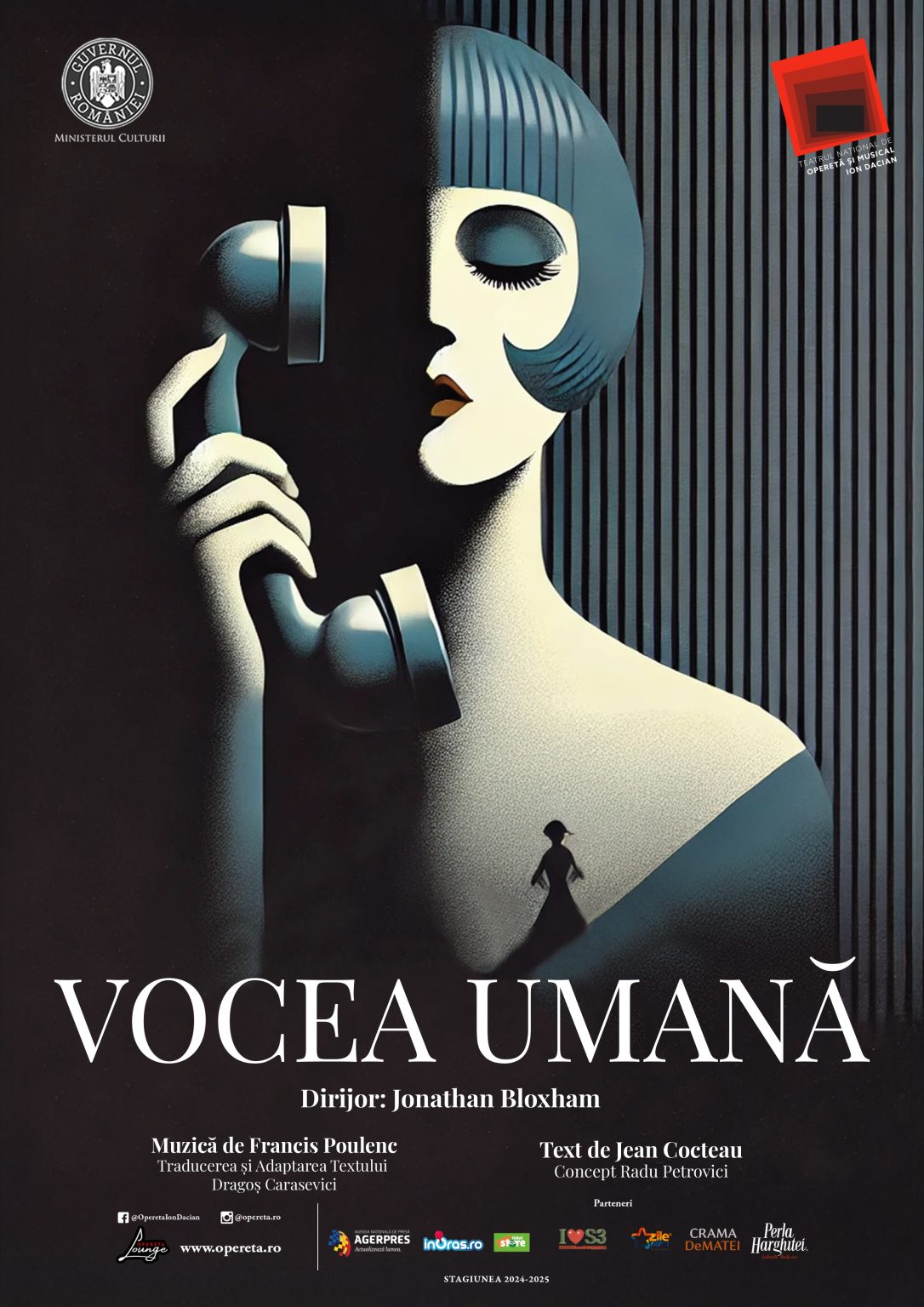
Vocea Umană, 2025

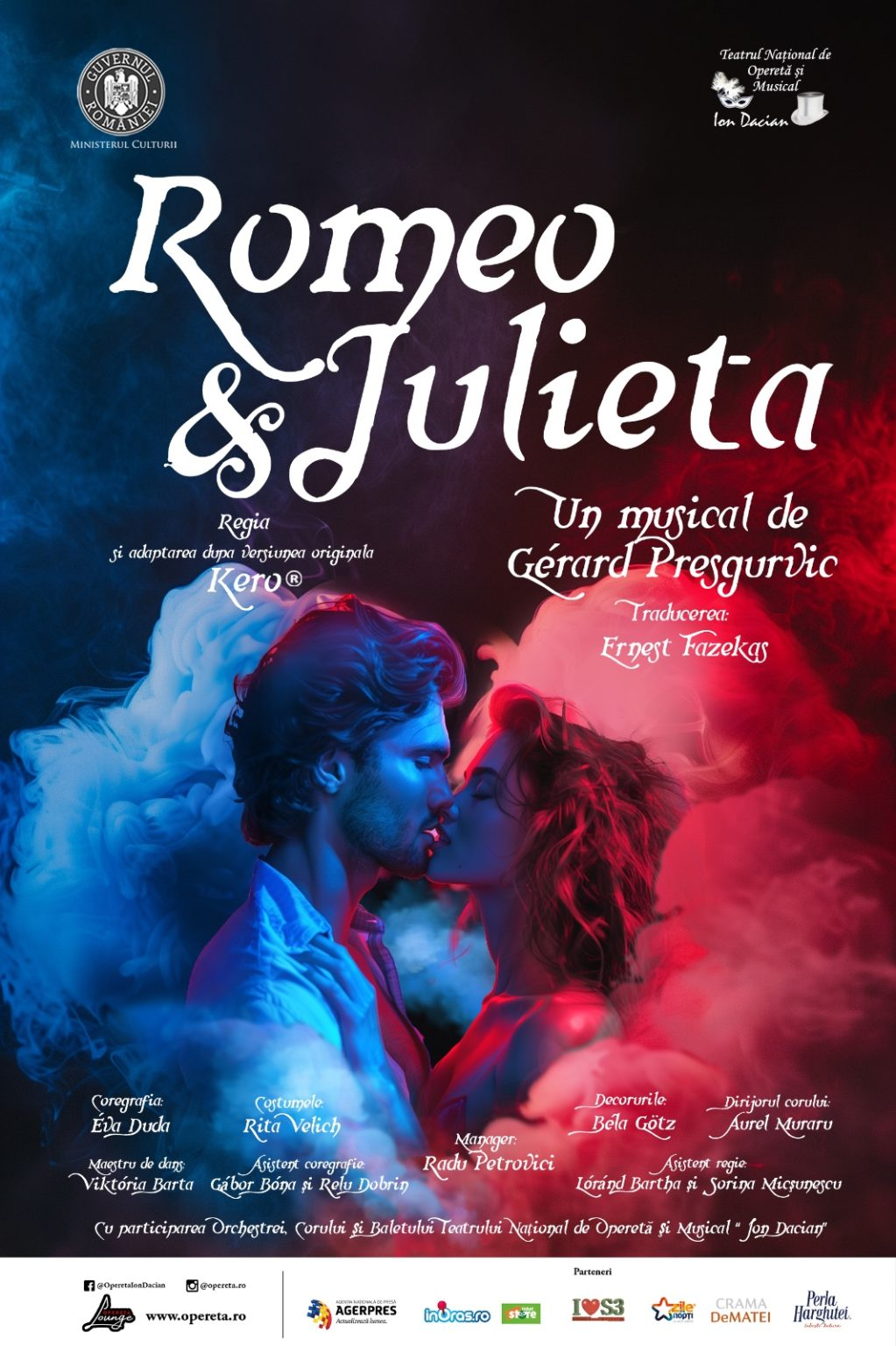
Romeo și Julieta, 2025

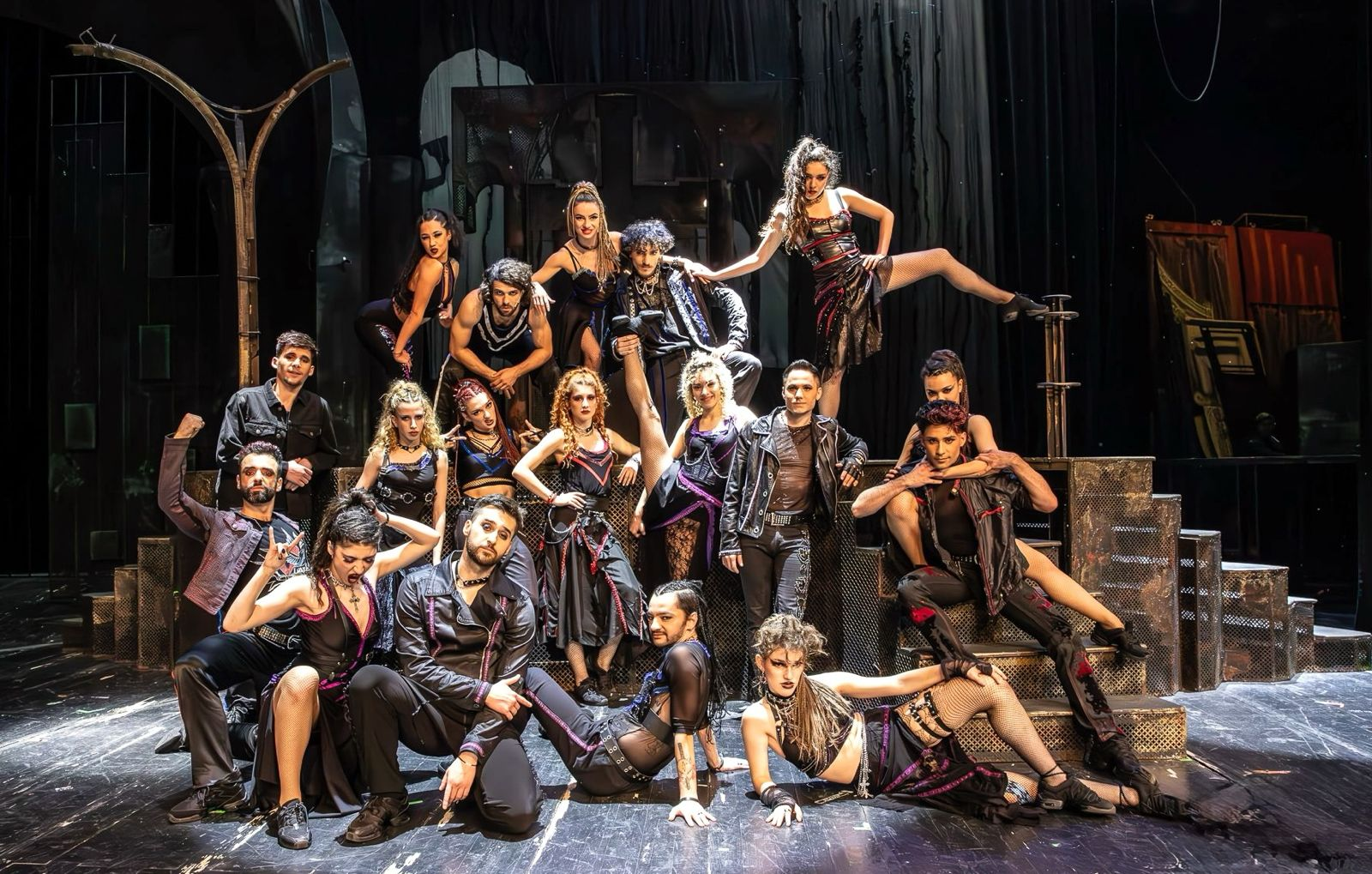
Romeo și Julieta, the cast, 2025

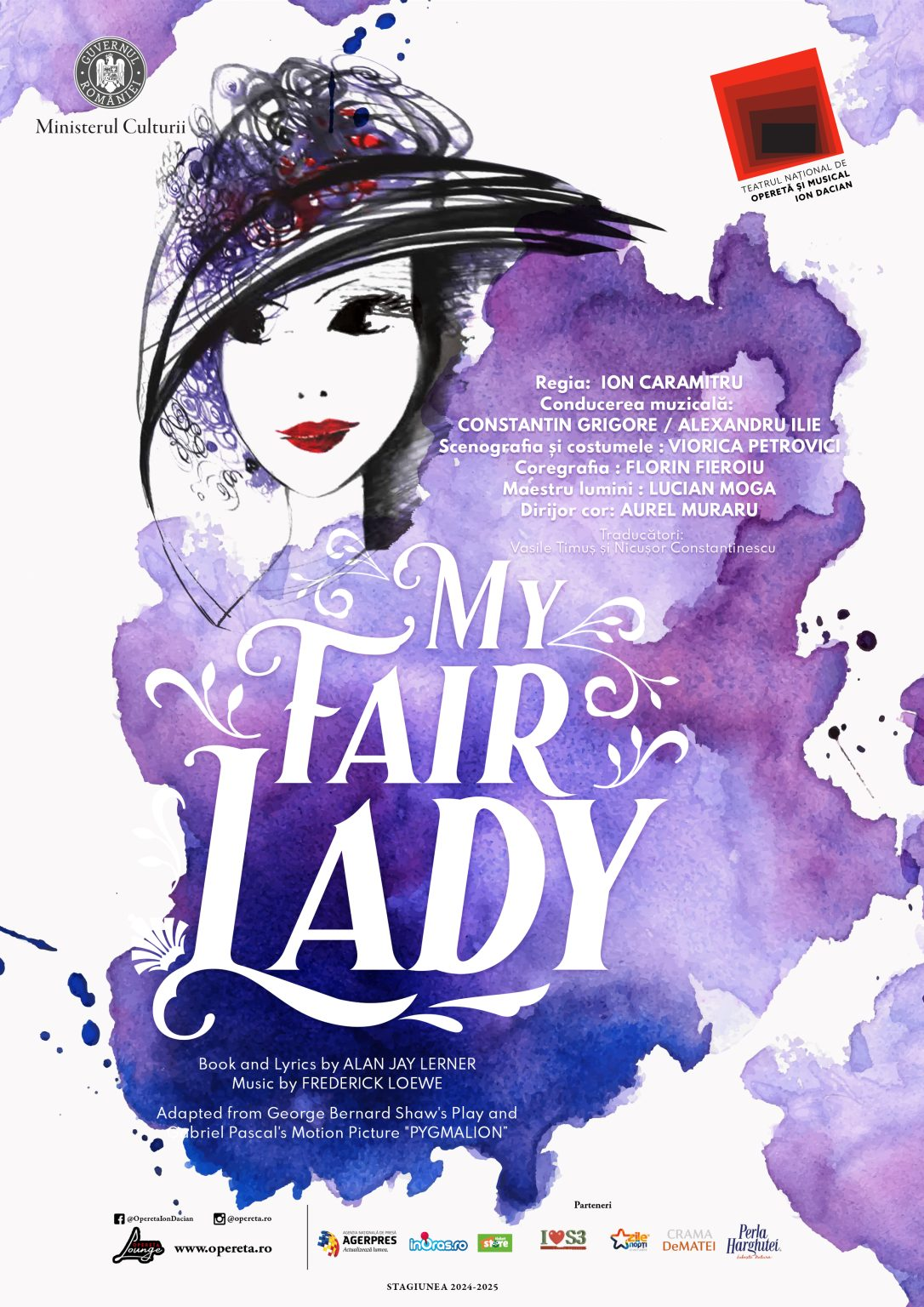
My Fair Lady, 2025.

The Bucharest Operetta Theatre is the only theatre in Europe specializing in operetta, as others have either closed or shifted their focus. In comparison with the dismal state of the French lyrical theatre scene described by Christiane Stutzmann in 2017, Romania still carries the torch for a stage dedicated to operetta, as well as to musical theatre. The TNOMID primarily produces foreign adaptations while occasionally offering original Romanian creations.

According to various activity reports produced by the theatre since 2008, the operetta audience is clearly senior (over sixty years old, accounting for 80%), whereas the musical theatre audience is significantly younger (aged 20–45, also around 80%). The theatre therefore increases the number of musicals in order to develop a younger audience, which will allow it both to raise revenue per performance (as musical tickets are more expensive than operetta tickets) and to build loyalty among a new audience.

Thus, a new rock opera, inspired by a major success of 1970s Romanian rock music by the legendary band Phoenix (Romanian band)—Cantafabule— was announced by the theatre's director on 9 May 2025 for the 2025–2026 season. The production will be an entirely Romanian creation, developed in collaboration with the band's former singer, composer, and musician: Josef Kappl.

== Bibliography ==
=== Books and journals ===
- Lavinia Betea (2006). "L'homme nouveau" [The new man] (PDF). Synergie Roumanie, revue du GERFLINT (in French). Entre Risque et Liberté – La Roumanie et l'Europe, Coordonné par Dorin Constantin Domuţa (1). Paris: GERFLINT: 123–129. ISSN 2261-3463.
- Gabriel Catalan (2009). "Teatrul şi muzica din România în primii ani de comunism (I)" [Theatre and Music in Romania in the Early Years of Communism (I)] (PDF). Revista arhivelor (in Romanian). 1 (75). Bucarest: Arhivele Naţionale ale României: 187–203. ISSN 2261-3463.
- Gabriel Catalan (2010). "Teatrul şi muzica din România în primii ani de comunism (II)" [Theatre and Music in Romania in the Early Years of Communism (II)] (PDF). Revista arhivelor (in Romanian). 1 (76). Bucarest: Arhivele Naţionale ale României: 209–236. ISSN 2261-3463.
- Firca, Gheorghe (2006). "La Roumanie. Culture musicale au fil de l'histoire" [Romania: Musical culture through history]. Études Balkaniques (in French). 1 (13). Paris: Association Pierre Belon: 214–229. ISBN 9782910860066.
- François de Liencourt (April–June 1961). "Le théâtre, le pouvoir et le spectateur soviétiques" [Theatre, Power, and Soviet Spectators]. Cahiers du monde russe et soviétique (in French). 2 (2). Paris: Éditions de l'EHESS (École des hautes études en sciences sociales): 166–211. ISSN 1777-5388.
- Răzvan-Ioan Dincă (2010). preface. Opereta de 60 de ani [Operetta of 60 years]. By Ion Moldovan; Eugenia Mirescu (in Romanian). Bucarest: Teatrul National de Opereta Ion Dacian.
- Irina Gridan (January–March 2011). "Du communisme national au national-communisme – Réactions à la soviétisation dans la Roumanie des années 1960" [From Nationalized Communism to National Communism: Reactions to Sovietization in 1960s Romania]. Vingtième Siècle (in French) (109). Paris: Presses de Sciences Po Revue d'histoire: 113–127. ISBN 9782724632064. ISSN 0294-1759.
- Vladimir Tismăneanu (2010). preface. Literatura şi artele în România comunistă 1948–1953 [Literature and the Arts in Communist Romania, 1948–1953]. By Cristian Vasile (in Romanian). Bucarest: editura humanitas. ISBN 978-973-50-2773-5.
- Daniela Gheorghe (2013–2015). "Din istoria scenelor bucureștene: Sala din Sărindar (I)" [From the History of Bucharest Stages: The Sărindar Hall (I)] (PDF). SCIA.TMC (Studii şi cercetări de istoria artei. Teatru, Muzică, Cinematografie) (in Romanian) (Tomurile 7-8-9, (51-52-53)). Bucharest: G. Oprescu Institute of Art History – Editura Academiei Române: 29–40. ISSN 2067-5119.
- Christiane Dupuy-Stutzmann (2016–2017). "L'opérette est-elle amenée à disparaître ?" [Is operetta destined to disappear?] (PDF). Mémoires de l'Académie de Stanislas (in French). XXXI. Nancy: Académie de Stanislas: 443–456. ISBN 9782724632064.
- Oana Ilie (2018). "The story of a story: the Grigoriu Theatre Company". Studia UBB Dramatica. Romanian Theatre – New Perspectives Celebrating the Centenary of Modern Romania (1918–2018)- 63 (1). Cluj: Université Babeș-Bolyai: 121–144. ISSN 2065-9539.
- Oana Ilie (2018). "Trupa de la "Grigoriu"" [The "Grigoriu" Troupe] (PDF). Muzeul Naţional (in Romanian) (XXX). Bucarest: Muzeului Naţional de Istorie a României: 69–89. ISSN 1015-0323.
- Tatiana Oltean (20 June 2019). "Lăsați-mă să cânt! [Let me sing!] – a Romanian operetta by Gherase Dendrino: links between the ethical, aesthetic and political content". Artes. Journal of Musicology. 19 (19–20). Iaşi: Universitatea Națională de Arte "George Enescu".
- Rosina Caterina Filimon (June 2019). "Ciprian Porumbescu și valorificarea folclorului în creația muzical-dramatică" [Ciprian Porumbescu and the use of folklore in musical-dramatic creation]. Conferința "Patrimoniul muzical din Republica Moldova (Folclor şi creaţie componistică)" (in Romanian). Chişinău, Moldova: 18–19.
- Valentina Sandu-Dediu (3 September 2020). "The New Romanian Operetta" of the 1950s. An Instrument in the Building of Socialism Ciprian Porumbescu and the Use of Folklore in Musical-Dramatic Creation". Popular Music Theatre Under Socialism Operettas and Musicals in the Eastern European States 1945 to 1990. Münster: Waxmann Publishing Co: 205–215. ISSN 1869-8417.
- Daniela Gheorghe (2020). "Din istoria scenelor bucureștene: Sala din Sărindar (II)" [From the history of Bucharest stages: the Sărindar Hall (II)] (PDF). SCIA.TMC (Studii şi cercetări de istoria artei. Teatru, Muzică, Cinematografie) (in Romanian) (Tomul 14 (58)). Bucarest: G. Oprescu Institute of Art History – Editura Academiei Române: 3–26. ISSN 2067-5119.
- Postolache, Inga (9 December 2022). "Premisele apariției musicalului românesc: pagini de istorie" [Premises of the emergence of the Romanian musical: pages of history]. Cultura și Arta: Cercetare, valorificare, promovare 2022 – Conferința "Cultura și arta: Cercetare, valorificare, promovare" (in Romanian). Chişinău, Moldova: 89–96.
- Postolache, Inga (2023). "Genres of Non-academic Musical Theater in Romania: Pages of History" (PDF). Învăţământ, Cercetare, Creaţie. 9 (1). Chişinău, Moldova: Facultatea de Arte – Universitatea Ovidiu: 347–356. ISSN 2601-3002.

=== Filmography and radio broadcasts ===
- Dance Motion Program (director) (23 April 2022). Adina Sima – "Orhideea". Special guest: Adina Sima, sings an aria from the musical Rebecca, "Manifesto for Peace," in the intensive Dance Motion preparation program, edition 6. National Theatre of Operetta and Musical "Ion Dacian" – 3:51 minutes (Video recording) (in Romanian). Teatrul Național de Operetă și Musical "Ion Dacian".
- Daniela Ivanov (director) (22 December 2022). Nicolae Leonard și Hariclea Darclée [Nicolae Leonard and Hariclea Darclée]. Azi ne întâlnim cu două voci mari. Aflăm povestea vieții "prințului operetei" – Nicolae Leonard și povestea premierei mondiale, la Roma, a operei Tosca, de Puccini, care a fost salvată de la dezastru de Hariclea Darclée / Today we meet two great voices. We learn the life story of the "prince of operetta" – Nicolae Leonard – and the story of the world premiere in Rome of Puccini's opera Tosca, which was saved from disaster by Hariclea Darclée – 29 minutes (Radio broadcasting) (in Romanian). Radio România Cultural.
- Flavius Calin (director) (22 January 2023). Cum a murit marele Constantin Tănase [How the great Constantin Tănase died]. 9 minutes 47 seconds (Video recording) (in Romanian). Stellarium.
- Beatrice Rancea (director) (13 December 2024). Printesa Circului [The Circus Princess]. Performance staged at the National Operetta Theatre of Bucharest – 59 seconds (Video recording) (in French). Teatrul Național de Operetă și Musical "Ion Dacian".
- Opereta Lounge – Excerpts from the 2023–2024 season:
  - Operetă Lounge – Sorin Zlat Jazz Series. 1:55 minute (Video recording) (in Romanian). TNOMID. 31 May 2024.
  - Opereta Lounge – Tango Passion. 2:50 minutes (Video recording) (in Romanian). TNOMID. 13 June 2024.
  - Opereta Lounge – Interbelic Serenade. 2:01 minutes (Video recording) (in Romanian). TNOMID. 6 July 2024.
  - Opereta Lounge – Sueño latino. 1:48 minute (Video recording) (in Romanian). TNOMID. 7 July 2024.
  - Tango Passion – Teaser. 37 secondes (Video recording) (in Romanian). TNOMID. 22 July 2024.
  - Opereta Lounge – Dragă Ana- One woman musical show. 2:33 minutes (Video recording) (in Romanian). TNOMID. 22 May 2024.
- Radu Petrovici (director) (8 February 2025). Vocea Umană [Human voice]. Performance staged at the National Operetta Theatre of Bucharest – 1:23 minute (Video recording) (in Romanian). TNOMID.

=== Activity reports, management contest objectives booklets, and management project submissions for contests ===
- Page containing activity reports for all institutions under the Romanian Ministry of Culture – Ministerul Culturii (Ministry of Culture) (2006–2025). "Transparență – Managementul instituțiilor subordonate – Rapoarte de activitate" [Transparency – Management of subordinate institutions – Activity reports]. cultura.ro (in Romanian).
  - Răzvan-Ioan Dincă (2011). Raportul final al managementului (2006–2011) Teatrului National "Ion Dacian" [Final Management Report (2006–2011) of the "Ion Dacian" National Theatre] (in Romanian). Bucarest: Ministerul Culturii (Ministry of Culture).
  - Bianca Ionescu-Ballo (2023). Teatrul Național de Operetă și Musical 'Ion Dacian' – raport de activitate pentru perioada 07.11.2018 – 07.11.2023 ['Ion Dacian' National Operetta and Musical Theatre – Activity Report for the Period 7 November 2018 – 7 November 2023] (PDF) (in Romanian). Bucarest: Ministerul Culturii (Ministry of Culture).
- Page for the management competitions organized for the Ion Dacian National Theater of Operetta and Musical – Ministerul Culturii (Ministry of Culture) (2016–2025). "Transparență – Managementul instituțiilor subordonate – Anunțuri management" [Transparency – Management of subordinate institutions – Management announcements]. cultura.ro (in Romanian).
  - 2018 competition for the 2019–2023 term: Ministerul culturii și identității naționale (2018). O.M.C.I.N. nr. 2605-03.08.2018 – caiet de obiective TNOMID [Ministry of Culture and National Identities no. 2605–03.08.2018 – TNOMID Objectives Booklet] (PDF) (in Romanian). Bucarest: Ministerul culturii și identității naționale (Ministry of Culture).
  - 2024 competition for the 2025–2029 term: Ministerul culturii (2024). OMC nr. 3109_02.08.2024 caiet de obiective TNOMID [Ministry of Culture no. 3109_02.08.2024 – TNOMID Objectives Booklet] (PDF) (in Romanian). Bucarest: Ministerul culturii (Ministry of Culture).
- Management plan for the Ion Dacian National Opera and Music Theater – 2024–2029 period: Radu Petrovici (2024). Project de management pentru Teatrul Național de Operetă și Musical 'Ion Dacian' – perioada 2024–2029 [Management Project for the 'Ion Dacian' National Operetta and Musical Theatre – 2024–2029 period] (PDF) (in Romanian). Bucarest: Ministerul culturii (Ministry of Culture).

=== Operetta arias and revues recordings ===
- performer: Constantin Tănase (1920–1945). "Antologie de cuplete din perioada interbelică" [Anthology of Couplets from the Interwar Period]. 58 minutes (via YouTube) (Discographic recordings) (in Romanian). Bucarest.
- performer: Svetlana Varguzova (1999). "The Wind of Liberty: Pepita's Song "Chertovu dyuzhinu detishek". Aria from the operetta 'Vent de Liberté' by Isaac Dunaïevski, 1999 recording, album 'Operetta, Operetta, Operetta' 1999, Moscow Operetta Theatre Orchestra – 3:10 minutes (via YouTube) (Discographic recordings) (in Russian). Moscou: JSC Firma Melodiya.
- performer: Kurt Großkurth; performer: Herta Talmar; performer: Herbert Ernst Groh (1954). "Oscar Straus: Ein Walzertraum (Highlights)". The operetta 'Ein Walzertraum', composed in 1907. Highlight musical moments from a complete recording produced by NWDR (Nordwestdeutscher Rundfunk) in 1954. The Cologne Radio Orchestra was conducted by Franz Marszalek – 37:53 minutes (via YouTube) (Radio recording) (in German). Cologne: Nordwestdeutscher Rundfunk.
- performer: Ion Dacian (c. 1960). "Când sărmanul tatăl meu" [When my poor father]. Aria taken from the operetta 'Vânzătorul de păsări' ('Der Vogelhändler') by Carl Zeller. Album 'Arii și Duete din operete', Teatru National de Opereta Ion Dacian, Electrecord, EDC 746 – 5:11 minutes (via YouTube) (Discographic recordings). collecton "Memoria Operetei" (in Romanian). Bucarest: Electrecord.
- performer: Ion Dacian (1966). "Ion Dacian si Corul Operetei Bucuresti-Mugurel de cantec romanesc (din opereta Lasati-ma sa cant)" [Ion Dacian and the Bucharest Operetta Chorus – Mugurel de cântec românesc (from the operetta Lăsați-mă să cânt)]. 'Lăsați-mă să cânt' (selections), Gherase Dendrino, Electrecord, ECD 1131, Romania, 1966 (via YouTube) (Discographic recordings) (in Romanian). Bucarest: Electrecord.
- performer: Ion Dacian (1968). "Lucia Roic şi Mircea Nemens – Vânt de libertate, Duetul Stela-Mario, 'Stela, numai tu luminezi drumul'" [Lucia Roic and Mircea Nemens – Wind of Freedom, Stela-Mario Duet, 'Stela, only you light the way']. Aria from the operetta 'Vânt de libertate', choir and orchestra of the National Operetta Theatre, Electrecord – ECE 0528 – 3:51 minutes (via YouTube) (Discographic recordings) (in Romanian). Bucarest: Electrecord.
- performer: Ion Dacian; interprète Cleopatra Melidoneanu (1970). "Loewe My Fair Lady highlights – in Romanian – Bucharest, 1970". Selected excerpts from the musical 'My Fair Lady' by Frederick Loewe. Conductor Liviu Cavassi, Choir and Orchestra of the National Operetta Theatre – 27 minutes (via YouTube) (TV broadcast) (in Romanian). Bucarest: TVR.
- performer: Ion Dacian (1971). "Sărmane lăutar pribeag" [Poor wandering minstrel]. Excerpt from 'Medalion Gherase Dendrino' – 1:46 minute (via YouTube) (TV broadcast) (in Romanian). Bucarest: TVR.
- performer: Nicolae Țăranu (1972). "Nicolae Țăranu – Filaret Barbu Ana Lugojana – Viața vreau s-o văd – Romanian Operetta". Ana Lugojana by Filaret Barbu, Lucia Roic, and Nicolae Țăranu, 'Viața vreau s-o văd cândva mai frumoasă' – 2:31 minutes (via YouTube) (TV broadcast) (in Romanian). Bucarest: TVR.
- Nicolae Țăranu (1972). "Lucia Roic, Nicolae Țăranu – Filaret Barbu Ana Lugojana – Drag mi-e satul – Romanian Operetta" [Lucia Roic, Nicolae Țăranu – Filaret Barbu Ana Lugojana – I love my village – Romanian Operetta]. Ana Lugojana by Filaret Barbu, Lucia Roic, and Nicolae Țăranu, 'Drag mi-e satul de pe coastă', choir and orchestra of the National Operetta Theatre, Bucharest, 1972, Bucharest – 5:11 minutes (via YouTube) (TV broadcast) (in Romanian). Bucarest: TVR.
- Cleopatra Melidoneanu soprano (1973). "Cleopatra Melidoneanu – Cavassi-Butoiescu Mătușa mea, Faustina". Recording of the operetta 'Mătușa mea, Faustina', Cleopatra Melidoneanu soprano – Liviu Cavassi (conductor), Choir and Orchestra of the National Operetta Theatre – 4:17 minutes (via YouTube.com) (Radio broadcasting) (in Romanian). Bucarest: romaniaevocis.
- Corul Conservatorului Ciprian Porumbescu (Choeur du conservatoire Ciprian Porumbescu) (1995). "Ciprian Porumbescu – Crai nou, Cor – Aria Dochitei – Hora" [Ciprian Porumbescu – Crai nou, Chœur – Aria de Dochieta" – Hora]. Aria from the operetta 'Crai nou', Orchestra of the Romanian Radio Studio and Choir of the Ciprian Porumbescu Conservatory, conducted by Carol Litvin, EDC 162, Romania, 2007, 1995 (1st ed.) – 4:56 minutes (via YouTube) (Discographic recordings – Ref Electrecord – EDC 162]) (in Romanian). Bucarest: Electrecord.
