= List of The Muny repertory =

The Muny, or the Municipal Opera Association of St. Louis, Missouri, in the United States, is a not-for-profit municipally owned outdoor theatre, the largest in the United States. The Theater was built and opened in 1917 with 6 performances of Verdi's Aida. It operates solely in the summer, and its first official season ran from June to August 1919. In the beginning, it presented the latest operas of the time, calling on local performers and national celebrities alike to perform for a short run of a one- to, on occasion, three-week run. More recently, however, the Muny has shifted to presenting musicals, some old, some new, and some of the Muny's creation.

Here follows a list of the many shows that the Muny has presented in its summer seasons, with known dates included. To date, the 1919 season is the only one to hold all new productions (being the first season). By contrast, the 1946 and 1993 seasons have been the only summers where no new shows were added to the repertory.

== Legend ==
The superscript notes below denote first productions (premieres), world premieres, in-season concerts, etc. at the Muny.

Muny Premiere: ^{MP}
World Premiere at the Muny: ^{WP}
Concert Presentation: ^{C}
Ballet/Dance Event: ^{B}
Ice Show: ^{I}
Original Revue: ^{R}

== 1910s ==
=== 1919 (Season 1) ===
- Robin Hood ^{MP} ^{19a}
- The Bohemian Girl ^{MP}
- El Capitan ^{MP}
- The Mikado ^{MP}
- The Wizard of the Nile ^{MP}
- Chimes of Normandy ^{MP}

^19a Featuring mayor Henry Kiel as King Richard

== 1920s ==
=== 1920 (Season 2) ===
- The Firefly ^{MP}
- Robin Hood
- Waltz Dream ^{MP}
- The Mikado
- Mascot ^{MP}
- The Gondoliers ^{MP}
- Babes in Toyland ^{MP}
- Katinka ^{MP}

=== 1921 (Season 3) ===
- June 7–12: The Chocolate Soldier ^{MP}
- June 14–19: Fra Diavolo ^{MP}
- June 21–26: The Fortune Teller ^{MP}
- June 28 – July 3: San Toy ^{MP}
- July 5–10: The Beggar Student ^{MP}
- July 12–17: The Pirates of Penzance ^{MP}
- July 19–24: The Chimes of Normandy
- July 26–31: Sari ^{MP}

=== 1922 (Season 4) ===
- June 6–11: The Highwayman ^{MP}
- June 13–18: Sweethearts ^{MP}
- June 20–25: Sari ^{22a} Eva Fallon, Arthur Geary
- June 27 – July 2: The Yeomen of the Guard ^{MP} Frank Moulan
- July 4–9: The Geisha ^{MP}
- July 11–16: The Spring Maid ^{22b} ^{MP}
- July 18–23: The Queen's Lace Handkerchief ^{MP}
- July 25–30: Miss Springtime ^{22c} ^{MP} Frank Moulan

^22aKalman's Der Zigeunerprimas.
^22bReinhardt's Die Sprudelfee.
^22cKalman's Zsuzsi kisasszony.

=== 1923 (Season 5) ===
- Naughty Marietta ^{MP}
- Wang ^{MP}
- The Fencing Master ^{MP}
- Prince of Pilsen ^{MP}
- Die Fledermaus ^{MP}
- Sweethearts
- The Gypsy Baron ^{MP}
- The Merry Widow ^{MP}
- Gypsy Love ^{MP}
- The Spring Maid

=== 1924 (Season 6) ===
- Princess Chic ^{MP}
- The Firefly
- Florodora ^{MP}
- A Chinese Honeymoon ^{MP}
- The Bohemian Girl
- Prince of Pilsen
- The Fortune Teller
- Lilac Domino ^{MP}
- Naughty Marietta
- The Beggar Princess ^{MP}

=== 1925 (Season 7) ===
- A Night in Venice ^{MP}
- Mlle. Modiste ^{MP}
- Ruddigore ^{MP}
- Her Regiment ^{MP}
- Rob Roy ^{MP}
- Dolly Varden ^{MP}
- Lady in Ermine ^{MP}
- Cavalleria Rusticana ^{MP}
- H.M.S. Pinafore ^{MP}
- The Count of Luxembourg ^{MP}
- Martha ^{MP}
- Naughty Marietta
- The Merry Widow

=== 1926 (Season 8) ===
- Eileen ^{MP}
- The Red Mill ^{MP}
- The Chocolate Soldier
- Spring Maid
- The Pink Lady ^{MP}
- Il Trovatore ^{MP}
- Sweethearts
- Iolanthe ^{MP}
- The Count of Luxembourg
- Woodland ^{MP}
- Fra Diavolo
- Babes in Toyland

=== 1927 (Season 9) ===
- Robin Hood
- The Princess Pat ^{MP}
- Sari
- Song of the Flame ^{MP}
- The Red Mill
- Rose-Marie ^{MP}
- The Mikado
- The Dollar Princess ^{MP}
- Katinka
- The Serenade ^{MP}
- Gypsy Love
- The Tales of Hoffmann ^{MP}

=== 1928 (Season 10) ===
- Princess Flavia ^{MP}
- The Merry Widow
- The Vagabond King ^{MP}
- No, No, Nanette ^{MP}
- Rose-Marie
- The Student Prince ^{MP}
- Lady in Ermine
- Song of the Flame
- The Love Song ^{MP}
- Mary ^{MP}
- Aida ^{28a}

^28a This was the first production of the Verdi opera in a complete season. It had been previously performed in 1917 in the newly built amphitheater for the 13th Annual Convention of the St. Louis Advertising Club.

=== 1929 (Season 11) ===
- Love Call ^{MP}
- The Student Prince
- Wildflower ^{MP}
- Castles in the Air ^{MP}
- The Chocolate Soldier
- The Bohemian Girl
- Rose-Marie
- Prince of Pilsen
- The Enchantress ^{MP}
- The Vagabond King
- Babes in Toyland
- Golden Dawn ^{MP}

== 1930s ==
=== 1930 (Season 12) ===
- Nina Rosa ^{MP}
- The Circus Princess ^{MP}
- The Desert Song ^{MP}
- The New Moon ^{MP}
- Blossom Time ^{MP}
- Alone at Last ^{MP}
- The Red Robe ^{MP}
- Maytime ^{MP}
- Madame Pompadour ^{MP}
- The Student Prince
- Show Boat ^{MP} ^{30a}

^30a Production starring W. C. Fields as Captain Andy.

=== 1931 (Season 13) ===
- Three Little Girls ^{MP}
- The Street Singer ^{MP} ^{31a}
- Music in May ^{MP}
- Nina Rosa
- Rose-Marie
- Countess Maritza ^{MP}
- The Three Musketeers ^{MP}
- A Wonderful Night ^{MP}
- Irene ^{MP}
- Circus Princess
- Rio Rita ^{MP}

^31a Film actor Cary Grant, appearing under his real name Archibald Leach, was a repertory performer during the 1931 season before starting his screen career. In addition to The Street Singer, Grant appeared in Music in May, Nina Rosa, The Three Musketeers, A Wonderful Night, Irene and Rio Rita.

=== 1932 (Season 14) ===
- The New Moon
- The Riviera Girl ^{MP}
- The Last Waltz ^{MP}
- Blossom Time
- The Desert Song
- The Rose of Stamboul ^{MP}
- The Honeymooners ^{MP}
- The Blue Paradise ^{MP}
- Sari
- The Land of Smiles ^{MP}
- Love Call
- Cyrano de Bergerac ^{WP}

=== 1933 (Season 15) ===
- Bitter Sweet ^{MP}
- Florodora
- White Lilacs ^{MP}
- Rip Van Winkle ^{MP}
- The Student Prince
- The Nightingale ^{MP}
- Naughty Marietta
- My Maryland ^{MP}
- Beau Brummell ^{MP}
- The Cat and the Fiddle ^{MP}
- The Desert Song

=== 1934 (Season 16) ===
- Sweet Adeline ^{MP}
- Cyrano de Bergerac
- The Last Waltz
- East Wind ^{MP}
- Mlle. Modiste
- Music in the Air ^{MP}
- The Rose of Algeria ^{MP}
- Sally ^{MP}
- The New Moon
- Show Boat

=== 1935 (Season 17) ===
- Teresina ^{MP}
- Rio Rita
- Madame Sherry ^{MP}
- The Chocolate Soldier
- Good News ^{MP}
- Vagabond King
- Sunny ^{MP}
- Beloved Rogue ^{MP}
- The Cat and the Fiddle
- The Desert Song
- Roberta ^{MP}
- Whoopee! ^{MP}

=== 1936 (Season 18) ===
- Kid Boots ^{MP}
- The Three Musketeers
- No, No, Nanette
- Sons o' Guns ^{MP}
- The Bohemian Girl
- Oh, Boy! ^{MP}
- The Merry Widow
- The New Moon
- A Connecticut Yankee ^{MP}
- Bitter Sweet
- The Red Mill
- Glamorous Night ^{MP}

=== 1937 (Season 19) ===
- The Great Waltz ^{MP}
- The Fortune Teller
- Music in the Air
- Louis the XIV ^{MP}
- The Mikado
- Salute to Spring ^{MP}
- Prince of Pilsen
- The Bartered Bride ^{MP}
- The Pink Lady
- Robin Hood
- Babes in Toyland
- Wild Violets ^{MP}

=== 1938 (Season 20) ===
- Gentlemen Unafraid ^{MP} ^{38a}
- Of Thee I Sing ^{MP}
- The White Horse Inn ^{MP}
- Roberta
- Virginia ^{MP}
- The Lost Waltz ^{MP}
- Chimes of Normandy
- Rosalie ^{MP}
- Knights of Song ^{MP}
- The Gingerbread Man ^{MP}
- Show Boat

^38a Production starring Red Skelton.

=== 1939 (Season 21) ===
- Rose-Marie
- Queen High ^{MP}
- The Lost Waltz
- Katinka
- Waltz Dream
- On Your Toes ^{MP}
- The Firefly
- The Bartered Bride
- Mary
- Babette ^{MP}
- Song of the Flame

== 1940s ==
=== 1940 (Season 22) ===
- The American Way ^{MP}
- Naughty Marietta
- Apple Blossoms ^{MP}
- Rio Rita
- The Chocolate Soldier
- Good News
- Knickerbocker Holiday ^{MP}
- Anything Goes ^{MP}
- East Wind
- Rosalie
- Babes in Arms ^{MP}
- The Great Waltz

=== 1941 (Season 23) ===
- New Orleans ^{MP}
- Sweethearts
- Too Many Girls ^{MP}
- The Firefly
- The Three Musketeers
- Irene
- Nina Rosa
- The Merry Widow
- Bitter Sweet
- The Desert Song
- The Red Mill
- Balalaika ^{MP}

=== 1942 (Season 24) ===
- Glamorous Night ^{MP}
- Sally
- Song of the Flame
- Hit the Deck ^{MP}
- No, No, Nanette
- The New Moon
- Girl Crazy ^{MP}
- Wildflower
- Roberta
- The Wizard of Oz ^{MP}
- Show Boat

=== 1943 (Season 25) ===
- Balalaika
- Sunny
- Rose-Marie
- Sons o' Guns
- The Chocolate Soldier
- The Great Waltz
- Rosalie
- The Desert Song
- Babes in Toyland
- The Merry Widow
- Chu Chin Chow ^{MP}

=== 1944 (Season 26) ===
- June 1–11: Open Road ^{MP}
- June 12–18: Good News
- June 19–25: The Vagabond King
- June 26 – July 2: Eileen
- July 3–9: Hit the Deck
- July 10–16: Naughty Marietta
- July 17–23: Music in the Air
- July 24–30: Maytime
- July 31 – August 6: Irene
- August 7–13: The Bohemian Girl
- August 14–20: The Red Mill
- August 21–27: Rio Rita

=== 1945 (Season 27) ===
- June 7–17: Jubilee ^{MP}
- June 18–24: O'Brien Girl ^{MP}
- June 25 – July 1: The Fortune Teller
- July 2–8: The New Moon
- July 9–15: The Cat and the Fiddle
- July 16–22: Madam Pompadour
- July 23–29: The Firefly
- July 30 – August 5: The Pink Lady
- August 6–12: The Three Musketeers
- August 13–19: Bitter Sweet
- August 20–26: Sari
- August 27 – September 2: Roberta

=== 1946 (Season 28) ===
- June 6–16: The Desert Song
- June 17–23: Mary
- June 24–30: Gipsy Love
- July 1–7: Rosalie
- July 8–14: The Merry Widow
- July 15–21: The Lost Waltz
- July 22–28: East Wind
- July 29 – August 4: Prince of Pilsen
- August 5–11: Robin Hood
- August 12–18: The Wizard of Oz ^{WP} ^{46a}
- August 19 – September 1: The Great Waltz

^46a New production for the Muny, using songs from the 1939 MGM film; adapted by Frank Gabrielson.

=== 1947 (Season 29) ===
- June 5–15: The Dancing Years ^{MP} ^{47a}
- June 16–22: Nina Rosa
- June 23–29: No, No, Nanette
- June 30 – July 6: Rose-Marie
- July 7–13: Apple Blossoms
- July 14–20: Die Fledermaus
- July 21–27: Sally
- July 28 – August 3: Chimes of Normandy
- August 4–10: Naughty Marietta
- August 11–17: Babes in Toyland
- August 18–31: Show Boat

^47a Production featuring Marge Champion.

=== 1948 (Season 30) ===
- June 3–13: Auld Lange Syne ^{MP}
- June 14–20: Venus in Silk ^{MP}
- June 21–27: Rio Rita
- June 28 – July 4: Hit the Deck
- July 5–11: The Three Musketeers
- July 12–18: The White Eagle ^{MP}
- July 19–25: Jubilee
- July 26 – August 1: A Connecticut Yankee
- August 2–8: Sunny
- August 9–15: Sari
- August 16–29: Up in Central Park ^{MP}

=== 1949 (Season 31) ===
- June 9–19: The New Moon
- June 20–26: Bloomer Girl ^{MP}
- June 27 – July 3: The Fortune Teller
- July 4–10: The Firefly
- July 11–17: The Chocolate Soldier
- July 18–24: Bitter Sweet
- July 25–31: Irene
- August 1–7: The Vagabond King
- August 8–14: Roberta
- August 15–21: The Red Mill
- August 22 – September 5: Song of Norway ^{MP}

== 1950s ==
=== 1950 (Season 32) ===
- June 8–18: Brigadoon ^{MP}
- June 19–25: Rosalie
- June 26 – July 2: East Wind
- July 3–9: Of Thee I Sing
- July 10–16: Robin Hood
- July 17–23: Lady in the Dark ^{MP}
- July 24–30: The Desert Song
- July 31 – August 6: The Pink Lady
- August 7–13: Whoopee!
- August 14–20: Rodgers and Hammerstein Music Festival ^{C}
- August 21 – September 3: Carousel ^{MP}

=== 1951 (Season 33) ===
- June 7–17: Nina Rosa
- June 18–24: High Button Shoes ^{MP}
- June 25 – July 1: Music in the Air ^{MP}
- July 2–8: Miss Liberty ^{MP}
- July 9–15: Die Fledermaus
- July 16–22: Girl Crazy
- July 23–29: Rodgers and Hammerstein Music Festival ^{C}
- July 30 – August 5: The Bohemian Girl
- August 6–12: The Merry Widow
- August 13–19: The Wizard of Oz
- August 20 – September 2: The Great Waltz

=== 1952 (Season 34) ===
- June 5–15: Show Boat
- June 16–22: Sally
- June 23–29: The Cat and the Fiddle
- June 30 – July 6: Rose-Marie
- July 7–13: The Student Prince
- July 14–20: The Bartered Bride
- July 21–27: Countess Maritza
- July 28 – August 3: Mlle. Modiste
- August 4–10: Naughty Marietta
- August 11–17: Babes in Toyland
- August 18–31: Annie Get Your Gun ^{MP}

=== 1953 (Season 35) ===
- June 4–14: Up in Central Park
- June 15–21: Bloomer Girl
- Cyrano de Bergerac
- June 29 – July 5: Rio Rita
- July 6–12: Blossom Time
- July 13–19: Rip Van Winkle
- July 20–26: No, No, Nanette
- July 27 – August 2: Carmen ^{MP}
- August 3–9: One Touch of Venus ^{MP}
- August 10–16: Bitter Sweet
- August 17–30: Kiss Me, Kate ^{MP}

=== 1954 (Season 36) ===
- June 3–13: Call Me Madam ^{MP}
- June 14–20: The New Moon
- June 21–27: Song of Norway
- June 28 – July 4: Roberta
- July 5–11: The Mikado
- July 12–18: Gentlemen Prefer Blondes ^{MP}
- July 19–25: The Three Musketeers
- July 26 – August 1: Panama Hattie ^{MP}
- August 2–8: Where's Charley? ^{MP}
- August 9–15: The Red Mill
- August 16–29: Oklahoma! ^{MP}

=== 1955 (Season 37) ===
- June 2–12: The Merry Widow
- June 13–19: Brigadoon
- June 20–26: Wonderful Town ^{MP}
- June 27 – July 3: The Vagabond King
- July 4–10: Guys and Dolls ^{MP}
- July 11–17: The Desert Song
- July 18–24: Rodgers and Hammerstein in Concert ^{C}
- July 25–31: Carousel
- August 1–7: Allegro ^{MP}
- August 8–14: The King and I ^{MP}
- August 15–28: South Pacific ^{MP}

=== 1956 (Season 38) ===
- June 7–17: Annie Get Your Gun
- June 18–24: Paint Your Wagon ^{MP}
- June 25 – July 1: The Student Prince
- July 2–8: Hit the Deck
- July 9–15: The Great Waltz
- July 16–22: The Chocolate Soldier
- July 23–29: Wish You Were Here ^{MP}
- July 30 – August 5: Kiss Me, Kate
- August 6–12: An Evening of Great Music ^{WP}
- August 13–19: Peter Pan ^{MP}
- August 20 – September 2: Kismet ^{MP}

=== 1957 (Season 39) ===
- June 6–16: South Pacific
- June 17–23: Plain and Fancy ^{MP.}
- June 24–30: Damn Yankees ^{MP}
- July 1–7: The New Moon
- July 8–14: Guys and Dolls
- July 15–21: Irene
- July 22–28: Naughty Marietta
- July 29 – August 4: Can-Can ^{MP}
- August 5–11: An Evening of Great Music
- August 12–18: The Wizard of Oz ^{57a}
- August 19 – September 1: The Pajama Game ^{MP}

^57a Production featuring Margaret Hamilton as the Wicked Witch.

=== 1958 (Season 40) ===
- June 5–15: Show Boat – Andy Devine, Marion Marlowe
- June 16–22: Roberta – Bob Hope
- June 23–29: Silk Stockings ^{MP} – Dolores Gray, Norwood Smith
- June 30 – July 6: Rose-Marie – Elaine Malbin, Paul Gilbert
- July 7–13: Lady in the Dark – Dolores Gray, Hans Conried
- July 14–20: On the Town ^{MP} – Mary McCarty, Paul Gilbert
- July 21–27: Rosalinda ^{MP} – Jean Fenn, Hans Conried
- July 28 – August 3: Happy Hunting ^{MP} – Allan Jones, Penny Singleton, Virginia Gibson
- August 4–10: Finian's Rainbow ^{MP} – Will Mahoney, Virginia Gibson
- August 11–17: Hansel and Gretel/Nutcracker Ballet (Act II) ^{MP}
- August 18–31: Oklahoma! – Dorothy Collins, Helen Gallagher

=== 1959 (Season 41) ===
- June 11–21: The King and I – Patricia Morison, Tony Dexter
- June 22–28: Song of Norway – Claramae Turner, Stephen Douglass, Hans Conried, Lee Venora
- June 29 – July 5: Oh, Captain! ^{MP} – Denise Darcel, Martyn Green, Doretta Morrow, Wilbur Evans
- July 6–12: Rio Rita – Stephen Douglass, Larry Storch
- July 13–19: Gentlemen Prefer Blondes – Maureen Cannon, Russell Nype
- July 20–26: Fanny ^{MP} – Wilbur Evans, Robert Penn
- July 27 – August 2: Li'l Abner ^{MP} – Stephen Douglass, Virginia Gibson
- August 3–9: Carmen – Jean Madeira, Robert Rounseville
- August 10–16: Call Me Madam – Penny Singleton, Russell Nype
- August 17–23: Babes in Toyland – Rowan and Martin
- August 24 – September 6: Bells Are Ringing ^{MP} – Julius La Rosa, Jacqueline James

== 1960s ==
=== 1960 (Season 42) ===
- June 9–19: Meet Me in St. Louis ^{MP} – Peggy King, Virginia Gibson, Mary Wickes, Howard St. John
- June 20–26: Kismet – Gene Barry
- June 27 – July 3: Anything Goes – Andy Devine, Bill Hayes, Julie Wilson
- July 4–10: The Desert Song – Stephen Douglass, Elaine Malbin
- July 11–17: The Student Prince – Richard Banke, Jacquelyn McKeever
- July 18–24: Tom Sawyer ^{MP} – Timmy Everett, Danny Meehan
- July 25–31: Rosalie – Dorothy Collins, Bobby Van, Arthur Treacher
- August 1–7: Madame Butterfly – Irene Jordan, Robert Rounseville, Walter Cassel
- August 8–14: Knights of Song – Martyn Green ^{60a}, Earl Wrightson, Lois Hunt
- August 15–21: The Red Mill – Rowan & Martin
- August 22 – September 4: Redhead ^{MP} – Helen Gallagher, Peter Palmer

^60a This was Martyn Green's first public appearance since his accident in 1959 which resulted in the amputation of one of his legs.

=== 1961 (Season 43) ===
- June 12–25: Calamity Jane ^{MP} – Edith Adams, George Gaynes, Allyn Ann McLerie
- June 26 – July 2: Take Me Along ^{MP} – Jack Carson, Betty White, Wilbur Evans
- July 3–9: The Great Waltz – Shepperd Strudwick, Monte Amundsen
- July 10–16: Kiss Me, Kate – Patricia Morison, Earl Wrightson, Peggy King
- July 17–23: Destry Rides Again ^{MP} – Anne Jefreys, Tom Poston
- July 24–30: Robin Hood – Frank Porretta, Monte Amudnsen
- July 31 – August 6: Wish You Were Here – Sheree North, Marty Allen, Steve Rossi
- August 7–13: Can-Can – Dolores Gray, Norwood Smith, Jack Gilford
- August 14–20: Cinderella ^{MP} – Tommy Rall
- August 21 – September 3: Flower Drum Song ^{MP} – Yau Shan-Tung, Tim Herbert, Juanita Hall, Devra Korwin

=== 1962 (Season 44) ===
- June 11–24: Around the World in 80 Days ^{MP} ^{62a} – Cyril Ritchard, Pierre Olaf
- June 25 – July 1: Molly Darling ^{MP}
- July 2–8: The Pajama Game – Dolores Gray, Stephen Douglass, Helen Gallagher
- July 9–15: Mexican Holidays ^{MP}
- July 16–22: Bye Bye Birdie ^{MP} – Gretchen Wyler, Dick Patterson
- July 23–29: Annie Get Your Gun – Dolores Gray, Art Lund
- July 30 – August 5: Blossom Time
- August 6–12: Oklahoma! – Peter Palmer, Louise O'Brien
- August 13–19: The Wizard of Oz
- August 20 – September 2: The Music Man ^{MP} – Norwood Smith, Jacquelyn McKeever, Iggie Wolfington

^62a This was not the 1946 Cole Porter musical as previously identified here, but a musical version of Jules Verne's story with music by Sammy Fain.

=== 1963 (Season 45) ===
- June 10–23: Carnival! ^{MP} – Susan Watson, Stephen Douglass, Edward Villella, James Mitchell, Jo Anne Worley
- June 24–30: I Dream of Jeanie ^{MP}
- July 1–7: Li'l Abner – Bruce Yarnell, Virginia Gibson
- July 8–14: Brigadoon – Robert Horton
- July 15–21: The Unsinkable Molly Brown ^{MP} – Dolores Gray, Bruce Yarnell
- July 22–28: Babes in Toyland – Rowan & Martin
- July 29 – August 4: The King and I – Betty White, Charles Korvin
- August 5–11: Gypsy ^{MP} – Evelyn Brooks, Alfred Sandor, Susan Watson ^{63a}
- August 12–18: South Pacific – Giorgio Tozzi, Elizabeth Allen, Cliff Norton
- August 19 – September 1: West Side Story ^{MP} – Lee Venora, David Holliday

^63aBrooks and Watson were late substitutes for the originally cast Jacqueline James and Arlene Fontana.

=== 1964 (Season 46) ===
- June 8–21: My Fair Lady ^{MP} – Tom Helmore, Lola Fisher
- June 22–28: Show Boat – Andy Devine, Wynne Miller, Mary Wickes, William Lewis
- June 29 – July 5: Mr. President ^{MP} – Forrest Tucker, Evelyn Brooks
- July 6–12: Carousel – Bruce Yarnell, Marcia King, Wynne Miller, Robert Rounseville, Claramae Turner
- July 13–19: Tom Sawyer – Danny Lockin, Bobby Mariano, Anita Colombo
- July 20–26: Milk and Honey ^{MP} – Molly Picon, Patricia Morison, Walter Cassel, Tommy Rall
- July 27 – August 2: Damn Yankees – Eddie Bracken, Helen Gallagher
- August 3–9: The Boys from Syracuse ^{MP} – Mary McCarty
- August 10–16: Porgy and Bess ^{MP} – Cab Calloway
- August 17 – September 6: The Sound of Music ^{MP} – Wynne Miller, Shev Rodgers, Claramae Turner^{64a}

^64aThis was one of only two shows to be booked for three weeks at the Muny; Camelot, the next season, being the other. Wynne Miller was a late substitute for the originally cast Barbara Cook.

=== 1965 (Season 47) ===
- June 7–20: Meet Me in St. Louis – Anita Gillette, Mary Wickes
- June 21–27: Guys and Dolls – Macdonald Carey, Patrice Wymore, Joey Faye, Wynne Miller
- June 28 – July 4: Here's Love ^{MP} – Marion Marlowe, Jack Haskell, Jack Harrold
- July 5–11: 110 in the Shade ^{MP} – Gretchen Wyler, Bruce Yarnell, Art Lund
- July 12–18: Little Me ^{MP} – Donald O'Connor, Virginia Martin, Nancy Andrews
- July 19–25: Cinderella – William Lewis, Judith McCauley
- July 26 – August 1: The Student Prince – William Lewis, Patricia Welting
- August 2–8: High Button Shoes – Paul Gilbert, Marge Champion, Russell Arms
- August 9–15: Flower Drum Song – Jack Soo
- August 16 – September 5: Camelot ^{MP} – Pernell Roberts, Margot Moser, Bruce Yarnell

=== 1966 (Season 48) ===
- June 6–19: The Music Man – Eddie Albert, Margot Moser, Mary Wickes, The Buffalo Bills
- June 20–26: Good News – Peter Palmer, Nancy Dussault, Karen Morrow
- June 27 – July 3: Kiss Me, Kate – Patrice Munsel, Bob Wright
- July 4–10: The Desert Song – William Walker, Claire Alexander, William Lewis
- July 11–17: Can-Can – Jane Morgan
- July 18–24: Bye Bye Birdie – Gretchen Wyler, Dick Patterson
- July 25–31: Oklahoma! – Robert Horton
- August 1–7: Bells Are Ringing – Allen Ludden, Betty White
- August 8–14: Hansel and Gretel / Act II of The Nutcracker Ballet – Claramae Turner, Margaret Roggero, Monte Amundsen; Patricia Klekovic, Kenneth Johnson
- August 15–28: How to Succeed in Business Without Really Trying ^{MP} – Billy DeWolfe, Len Gochman

=== 1967 (Season 49) ===
- June 5–18: West Side Story – Anna Maria Alberghetti
- June 19–25: Wish You Were Here – James Darren and Sergio Franchi, Sdergio
- June 26 – July 2: Do I Hear a Waltz? ^{MP} – Dorothy Collins, Enzo Stuarti, Monique Van Vooren
- July 3–9: It's a Bird... It's a Plane... It's Superman ^{MP} – Bob Holiday, Charles Nelson Reilly, Karen Morrow, Richard France
- July 10–16: The New Moon – Bruce Yarnell, Margot Moser, William Lewis
- July 17–23: The Unsinkable Molly Brown – Kaye Stevens, Bruce Yarnell
- July 24–30: Funny Girl ^{MP} – Marilyn Michaels, Danny Carroll, Molly Picon, Norwood Smith

Special Added Attraction: The Royal Ballet, featuring Rudolf Nureyev and Margot Fonteyn

- August 1–2: Swan Lake
- August 3–4: Giselle
- August 5–6: Romeo and Juliet

Regular Season continues:

- August 7–13: On a Clear Day You Can See Forever ^{MP} – Linda Lavin^{67a}
- August 14–20: Gypsy – Jane Morgan, Jessica Walter
- August 21 – September 3: The King and I – Ann Blyth, Pernell Roberts

^67aVan Johnson was originally set to star as Dr. Mark Bruckner but dropped out.

=== 1968 (Season 50) ===
- June 3–16: My Fair Lady – Douglas Fairbanks, Jr., Margot Moser, Eddie Albert
- June 17–23: The Pajama Game – John Raitt, Jaye P. Morgan
- June 24–30: Annie Get Your Gun – Kaye Stevens, Bruce Yarnell
- July 1–7: The Merry Widow – Jean Pierre Aumont^{68a}
- July 8–14: Brigadoon – Ann Blyth, Bill Hayes, Bert Parks
- July 15–21: Carousel – John Davidson^{68b}
- July 22–28: Call Me Madam – Ethel Merman, Richard Eastham, Russell Nype

Special Attractions to Celebrate the Muny's 50th Season:

- July 29 – August 3: Hello, Dolly! ^{MP}^{68c} – Pearl Bailey, Cab Calloway
- August 4: Herb Alpert and the Tijuana Bass ^{C}

The Regular Season continues:

- August 5–11: Show Boat – Arthur Godfrey
- August 12–18: The Wizard of Oz – Tom Poston, Lana Cantrell
- August 19 – September 1: The Sound of Music – Florence Henderson, Bob Wright

^68aConstance Towers was cast as the Merry Widow but dropped out shortly before rehearsals.
^68bFeaturing 19-year-old Vicki Lawrence as Carrie Pipperidge.
^68cThe Broadway production closed for a week to transfer to The Muny for this special engagement.

=== 1969 (Season 51) ===
- June 2–15: State Fair ^{WP} – Ozzie and Harriet Nelson
- June 16–22: Kismet – Robert Horton, Gretchen Wyler, Henry Calvin
- June 23–29: Camelot – Sally Ann Howes, John Cullum
- June 30 – July 6: The Most Happy Fella ^{MP}
- July 7–20: Mame ^{MP} – Jane Morgan
- July 21–27: The Royal Ballet ^{B}
- July 28 – August 3: Damn Yankees ^{69a} – Ray Walston, Cyd Charisse
- August 4–10: Guys and Dolls – Barbara McNair, Jane Kean, Bill Elliott, Soupy Sales, Lou Thesz
- August 11–17: South Pacific – Earl Wrightson, Lesley Gore, Ray Walston
- August 18–31: Snow White and the Seven Dwarfs ^{MP}

^69aReorchestrated as a "rock" musical for a "contemporary" sound.

== 1970s ==
=== 1970 (Season 52) ===
Pre-Season Concerts

- The Red Skelton Show ^{C}
- An Evening with Burt Bacharach ^{C}
- The Engelbert Humperdinck Show ^{C}

The Regular Season

- July 6–12: Promises, Promises ^{MP} ^{70a} – Jerry Orbach
- July 13–19: Oliver! ^{MP} – Sid Caesar
- July 20–26: Man of La Mancha ^{MP} – Ed Ames
- July 27 – August 2: Oklahoma! – Jerry Lanning, Susan Watson, Bert Parks
- August 3–9: How to Succeed in Business Without Really Trying – Robert Morse
- August 10–16: George M! ^{MP} – Joel Grey
- August 17–30: Fiddler on the Roof ^{MP} – Robert Merrill
- September 1–6: The Moiseyev Dance Company ^{B}

^70aThe Broadway production closed for a week to transfer to The Muny for this special engagement.

=== 1971 (Season 53) ===
Special Preseason Engagement

- June 14–20:. The Stuttgart Ballet ^{B}

Regular Season

- June 28 – July 4: Hello, Dolly! – Pearl Bailey
- July 5–11: Applause ^{MP}^{71a} – Lauren Bacall

A week of concerts, July 12–18:

- The Glen Campbell Show ^{C}
- The Diahann Carroll Show ^{C}
- The Jim Nabors Show ^{C}
- The Jimmy Durante Show ^{C}
- The Robert Goulet Show ^{C}

Regular Season continues

- July 19–25: Sweet Charity ^{MP} – Juliet Prowse
- July 26 – August 1: The Music Man – Peter Marshall, Jack Bailey, Mary Wickes, Jackie Coogan, Cass Daley
- August 2–8: Two by Two ^{MP} – Milton Berle
- August 9–15: The Unsinkable Molly Brown – Barbara Eden, Jerry Lanning
- August 16–22: Cabaret ^{MP} – Joel Grey
- August 23–29: The King and I – Roberta Peters, James Shigeta
- August 30 – September 5: This Is Show Business ^{MP} – Betty Grable, Dorothy Lamour, Don Ameche, Dennis Day, Rudy Vallee, Chita Rivera

^71aThe Broadway production closed for a week for this engagement.

=== 1972 (Season 54) ===
- July 3–9: Follies ^{MP} ^{72a} – Alexis Smith, Gene Nelson, Dorothy Collins, John McMartin, Yvonne De Carlo

A week of concerts pauses the regular season

- July 10: The Carpenters; Skiles and Henderson^{C}
- July 11: The Big Show of 1936 ^{MP} – Ben Blue, Jackie Coogan, Cass Daley, The Ink Spots
- July 12: Dinah Shore, Peter Nero ^{C}
- July 13: Pearl Bailey ^{C}
- July 14–15: Sonny & Cher ^{C}
- July 16: Jim Nabors ^{C}

Regular season continues

- July 18–23: Ukrainian Dance Company ^{B}
- July 24–30: 1776 ^{MP} – William Daniels, Howard Da Silva, Jerry Lanning
- July 31 – August 6: The Liza Minnelli Show ^{C}
- August 7–13: Snow White and the Seven Dwarfs
- August 14–20: Anything Goes – Ann Miller, Pat Paulsen
- August 21–27: The Student Prince – Frank Porretta, Hans Conried, Mary Wickes
- August 28 – September 3: The Sound of Music – Jane Powell, Joseph Campanella

^72a This was the Broadway production which had closed the week before; the week at the Muny was followed by engagements in Los Angeles and San Francisco.

=== 1973 (Season 55) ===
Pre-Season Special

- June 29 – July 1: The Carroll O'Connor Show ^{C}

The Regular Season

- July 2–8: No, No, Nanette – Don Ameche, Evelyn Keyes
- July 9–15: South Pacific – Jerome Hines and Mary Travers
- July 16–22: Fiddler on the Roof – Herschel Bernardi
- July 23–29: Seesaw ^{MP}^{73a} – Michele Lee, John Gavin
- July 30 – August 5: Lorelei ^{MP}^{73b} – Carol Channing
- August 6–12: Irene^{73a} – Debbie Reynolds
- August 13–19: Bolshoi Ballet ^{B}
- August 20–26: Two Gentlemen of Verona ^{MP}
- August 28 – September 9: Gigi ^{MP}^{73b} – Alfred Drake, Agnes Moorehead, Daniel Massey, Maria Karnilova

^73aThe Broadway production closed for a week to transfer to the Muny for this special engagement.
^73bPre-Broadway tour.

=== 1974 (Season 56) ===
- July 1–7: Take Me Along – Gene Kelly
- July 8–14: Over Here! ^{MP} ^{74a} – The Andrews Sisters
- July 15–21: I Do! I Do! ^{MP} – Carol Burnett, Rock Hudson
- July 22–28: Man of La Mancha – Herschel Bernardi
- July 29 – August 4: Gypsy ^{73b} – Angela Lansbury
- August 5–11: Good News ^{73b} – Alice Faye, John Payne, Stubby Kaye
- August 12–18: Bitter Sweet – Roberta Peters
- August 19–25: Mack and Mabel ^{MP} ^{73b} – Robert Preston, Bernadette Peters
- August 26 – September 1: The Moiseyev Dance Company ^{B}

^74aThe Broadway production closed for a week to transfer to The Muny for this special engagement.
^73b Pre-Broadway tour.

=== 1975 (Season 57) ===
- June 30 – July 6: The Bolshoi Ballet ^{B}
  - June 30 and July 6: Swan Lake
  - July 1: Don Quixote, Act I, with Act II consisting of divertissements
  - July 2 and July 5: Giselle
  - July 3 and 4: Spartacus
- July 7–13: The Odd Couple ^{MP} ^{75a} – Tony Randall, Jack Klugman
- July 14–20: Carousel – Ed Ames
- July 21–27: Funny Girl – Carol Lawrence, Harve Presnell, Sylvia Syms
- July 28 – August 3: Camelot – David Birney, Tricia O'Neil, John Carradine
- August 4–10: Girl Crazy – Dolores Gray, Ann Reinking
- August 11–17: The Wizard of Oz – The Hudson Brothers, Margaret Hamilton, Karen Wyman
- August 18–24: Kiss Me, Kate – Ann Blyth, Richard Fredricks
- August 25–31: The Mitzi Gaynor Show ^{C}

^75aThis was the only time in its history the Muny presented a nonmusical play.

=== 1976 (Season 58) ===
Muny Salutes '76, a series of preseason concerts for the Bicentennial of the United States

- June 26: Leonard Bernstein New York Philharmonic ^{C}
- June 27: Andre Kostelanetz New York Philharmonic ^{C}
- June 28–30: Al Hirt's Impressions of New Orleans ^{C}
- July 1–2: Grand Ole Muny Opera ^{C}
- July 3–4: Burt Bacharach and Anthony Newley ^{C}

The Regular Season

- July 5–11: Fiddler on the Roof – Zero Mostel
- July 12–18: Mame – Angela Lansbury, Anne Francine, Jane Connell
- July 19–25: On the Town – The Hudson Brothers
- July 26 – August 1: Show Boat – Shirley Jones, Gale Gordon, Ron Husmann, Kelly Garrett
- August 2–8: The King and I – Yul Brynner, Constance Towers
- August 9–15: Oliver! – Vincent Price
- August 16–22: The Baker's Wife ^{MP} ^{76a} – Topol, Patti LuPone, Kurt Peterson, Keene Curtis
- August 23–29: Russian Festival of Music and Dance ^{C B}
- August 30 – September 5: 1776 – Peter Graves, Howard Da Silva

^76a Pre-Broadway tryout; the show closed before it ever got to Broadway.

=== 1977 (Season 59) ===
- June 27 – July 3: Meet Me in St. Louis – Alan Young, Mary Wickes, Julia Meade, Karen Wyman
- July 4–10: Hello, Dolly! – Carol Channing
- July 11–17: Finian's Rainbow – Paul Williams, Nancy Dussault
- July 18–24: Guys and Dolls – Leslie Uggams, Richard Roundtree
- July 25–31: Wonderful Town – Lauren Bacall
- August 1–7: The Sound of Music – Shirley Jones
- August 8–14: Kismet – Len Cariou, Virginia Martin, George Rose
- August 15–21: Porgy and Bess – Houston Grand Opera
- August 22–28: Sweet Charity – Carol Lawrence
- August 29 – September 4: Chicago ^{MP} ^{77a} – Jerry Orbach

^77aThe Broadway production was scheduled to close for one week to transfer to the Muny for this special engagement. As it turned out, the Broadway show closed – after 936 performances – on August 27, the Saturday before the Muny engagement.

=== 1978 (Season 60) ===
- June 19–25: Seven Brides for Seven Brothers ^{MP} – Jane Powell, Howard Keel
- June 26 – July 9: Annie ^{MP}^{78a}
- July 10–16: Man of La Mancha – Ed Ames
- July 17–23: Oklahoma! – John McCook, Mary Wickes, Stubby Kaye
- July 24–30: The Music Man – Tony Randall
- July 31 – August 6: Madame Butterfly
- August 7–13: Damn Yankees – Vincent Price, Michele Lee
- August 14–20: Dutch National Ballet ^{B} – Rudolf Nureyev
- August 21–27: Peter Pan

^78aNational touring company.

=== 1979 (Season 61) ===
- June 25 – July 1: My Fair Lady – David Birney, Anita Gillette, Milo O'Shea
- July 2–8: A Funny Thing Happened on the Way to the Forum ^{MP} – Arte Johnson, Hans Conried, Avery Schreiber, John Carradine, Benny Baker
- July 9–15: Shenandoah ^{MP} – Ed Ames
- July 16–22: Brigadoon – John McCook, Victoria Mallory
- July 23–29: The Desert Song – Ann Blyth, Richard Fredricks, Alan Sues
- July 30 – August 5: Carousel – Robert Goulet
- August 6–12: Tom Sawyer – Don Grady,^{79a} William Lonsdale Hurst
- August 13–19: Sugar ^{MP} – Robert Morse, Ken Berry, Donald O'Connor
- August 20–26: Ballroom ^{MP} – Janis Paige, Forrest Tucker
- August 27 – September 2: Bells Are Ringing – Florence Henderson, Dean Jones

^79aDon Grady, age 35, played the "12 or 13 years old" Huckleberry Finn.

== 1980s ==
=== 1980 (Season 62) ===
Preseason Special Attraction

- Richard Rodgers in Concert ^{C} – Walter Cronkite and Marsha Mason as narrators

Regular Season:

- June 23–29: South Pacific – Florence Henderson, Giorgio Tozzi
- June 30 – July 6: The Debbie Reynolds Show ^{C}
- July 7–13: Carnival! – Robert Conrad, Marti Rolph, Swen Swenson
- July 14–20: Bye Bye Birdie – Chita Rivera, Russ Tamblyn, Audrey Christie
- July 21–27: Little Me – Donald O'Connor, Eve Arden
- July 28 – August 3: Li'l Abner – Joe Namath
- August 4–10: Cinderella
- August 11–17: Al Jolson Tonight! ^{MP}^{80a} – Larry Kert
- August 18–24: The Merry Widow – Roberta Peters, Ron Husmann
- August 25 – September 7: Sugar Babies ^{MP} – Carol Channing, Robert Morse

^80aPresented as a pre-Broadway tryout tour, but it never made it to Broadway.

=== 1981 (Season 63) ===
- June 15–21: Kiss Me, Kate – Robert Goulet, Leigh Beery
- June 22–28: Flower Drum Song – Pat Suzuki,^{81a} Khigh Dhiegh
- June 29 – July 5: George M! – Ken Berry
- July 6–12: Camelot – Richard Harris
- July 13–19: Annie Get Your Gun – Florence Henderson, Ron Husmann
- July 20–26: Show Boat – Van Johnson
- July 27 – August 2: A Grand Night for Singing ^{MP} ^{81b}
- August 3–9: Hans Christian Andersen ^{MP} – Larry Kert
- August 10–16: How to Succeed in Business Without Really Trying – Fred Grandy, Don Ameche
- August 17–23: The Mitzi Gaynor Show ^{C}
- August 24–30: A Chorus Line ^{MP}

^81aPat Suzuki, 23 years earlier the original Broadway Linda Low, was cast here as Madam Liang.
^81bA concert of opera and operetta scenes and arias, including the entire second act of Die Fledermaus.

=== 1982 (Season 64) ===
- June 21–27: Fiddler on the Roof – Paul Lipson
- June 28 – July 4: The Unsinkable Molly Brown – Ann Reinking
- July 5–11: The Sound of Music – Victoria Mallory, George Peppard
- July 12–18: Gigi – Larry Kert, Robert Wright, Gloria DeHaven, Anne Francine
- July 19–25: Anything Goes – Chita Rivera, Larry Kert, Iggie Wolfington
- July 26 – August 1: West Side Story – Barry Williams, Christine Andreas
- August 2–8: Grease ^{MP}
- August 9–15: They're Playing Our Song ^{MP} – Lucie Arnaz, Laurence Luckinbill
- August 16–22: Where's Charley? – Robert Morse, Edie Adams
- August 23–29: The Wiz ^{MP}
- August 30 – September 5:^{82a} A Chorus Line

^82aA touring production of Hello, Dolly! was originally scheduled to close the season, but was cancelled by James Nederlander. The touring A Chorus Line was substituted, thus being presented for two summers in a row.

=== 1983 (Season 65) ===
- June 20–26: The King and I – Lynn Redgrave, Michael Kermoyan
- June 27 – July 3: Promises, Promises – John James
- July 4–10: Can-Can – Judy Kaye, John Reardon
- July 11–17: Annie – Martha Raye
- July 18–24: Pal Joey ^{MP} – Joel Grey, Alexis Smith
- July 25–31: High Button Shoes – Gavin MacLeod
- August 1–7: Man of La Mancha – John Raitt
- August 8–14: Mikhail Baryshnikov: An Evening of Classical Ballet ^{B}
- August 15–21: Camelot – Richard Harris
- August 22–28: The Pirates of Penzance – William Katt, Maria Muldaur, George Rose
- August 29 – September 4: I Do! I Do! – Lucie Arnaz, Laurence Luckinbill

=== 1984 (Season 66)^{84b} ===
- July 9–15: The Music Man – Jim Dale, Pam Dawber
- July 16–22: Dream Street ^{MP}
- July 23–29: Funny Girl – Juliet Prowse, Larry Kert
- July 30 – August 5: Oklahoma! – John Davidson
- August 6–12: Sugar Babies – Mickey Rooney, Ann Miller
- August 13–19: Sleeping Beauty^{84a}

^84aThis was not the Tchaikovsky ballet, but a new stage musical version of the classic fairy tale. The score was a kind of mishmash of various things, including some Tchaikovsky, for instance, his Waltz of the Flowers from The Nutcracker.
^84bThis was the shortest Muny season since the opening seasons over sixty years earlier, with no dates in June and ending in mid-August. The original intention was to close August with the touring production of My One and Only, to play the Fox Theater instead of The Muny, but the engagement was cancelled.

=== 1985 (Season 67) ===
- June 17–23: A Chorus Line – Donna McKechnie, Nicholas Dante
- June 24–30: My Fair Lady – Michael Allinson, Victoria Mallory
- no show the week that includes July 4
- July 8–14: Fantasy on Ice ^{I} – Dorothy Hamill
- July 15–21: Dancin' ^{MP}
- July 22–28: Jesus Christ Superstar ^{MP} – Anthony Geary, Carl Anderson
- August 5–11: Evita ^{MP} – Florence Lacey
- August 12–18: 42nd Street ^{MP} – Elizabeth Allen

=== 1986 (Season 68) ===
- June 16–22: 42nd Street^{86a} – Elizabeth Allen
- June 23–29: Singin' in the Rain ^{MP}^{86b} – Donn Simeone, Brad Moranz, Cynthia Ferrer
- no show the week that includes July 4
- July 7–13: Swan Lake ^{B} – La Scala Ballet Company^{86c}
- July 14–20: Show Boat – Eddie Bracken, Susan Powell, Ron Raines
- July 21–27: La Cage aux Folles ^{MP} – Peter Marshall, Keene Curtis
- July 28 – August 3: Pippin ^{MP} – Ben Vereen
- August 4–10: Gentlemen Prefer Blondes – Morgan Fairchild, Debbie Shapiro
- August 11–17: Shenandoah – John Cullum
- August 18–24: "The Diary of Adam and Eve" from The Apple Tree ^{MP} and Joseph and the Amazing Technicolor Dreamcoat ^{MP} – Rex Smith (as Adam and Joseph) and Donna McKechnie (as Eve and the Narrator)

^86aSince 42nd Street closed the previous season and opened this one, it's the only time in Muny history that season ticket holders sat through the same show in consecutive bookings.
^86bThe MGM movie classic starred Gene Kelly, Donald O'Connor and Debbie Reynolds, all of whom appeared at the Muny in the 1970s.
^86cIn Franco Zeffirelli's production.

=== 1987 (Season 69) ===
- June 15–21: The Sound of Music – Debby Boone, David Cryer
- June 22–28: My One and Only ^{MP} ^{87a} – Tommy Tune, Stephanie Zimbalist
- July 6–12: Cats ^{MP} ^{87b}
- July 13–19: Fiddler on the Roof – Theodore Bikel, Thelma Lee, Ruth Jaroslow
- July 20–26: Peter Pan – Cathy Rigby, John Schuck
- August 3–9: Around the World in 80 Days – Tony Randall, Robert Clary
- August 10–16: Big River ^{MP}

^87aMy One and Only was based on the Gershwin musical Funny Face, which originally starred Fred Astaire on Broadway in 1927 and in a musical movie of the same name in 1957. This Muny presentation opened the day Fred Astaire died ... and it was rained out; a bad day all around.
^87bFor the second show in a row, the opening night, which was a sellout, was rained out.

=== 1988 (Season 70) ===
- June 20–26: The Music Man – John Davidson
- July 11–17: Porgy and Bess
- July 18–24: The Mystery of Edwin Drood ^{MP} – Jean Stapleton, Clive Revill
- July 25–31: Oliver! – Orson Bean
- August 1–7: Man of La Mancha – Hal Linden
- August 8–14: Grease – Jack Wagner
- August 15–21: Carousel – Rex Smith, Stephanie Zimbalist, Patrice Munsel

=== 1989 (Season 71) ===
- June 5–11: A Chorus Line – Donna McKechnie
- June 19–25: Gypsy – Tyne Daly
- July 17–23: The King and I – Stacy Keach, Mary Beth Peil
- July 24–30: Evita – Saundra Santiago
- July 31 – August 6: Godspell ^{MP} – Adrian Zmed, Stephen Lehew
- August 14–20: The Unsinkable Molly Brown – Debbie Reynolds, Harve Presnell
- August 21–27: Annie – Jo Anne Worley

== 1990s ==
=== 1990 (Season 72) ===
- West Side Story (June 25 – July 1). (featuring Betsy True as Maria, Peter Gantenbein as Tony, Jackie Lowe as Anita, Michael Gruber as Riff / Understudy for Tony, Robert Montano as Bernardo, Julio Monge as Chino, Elek Hartman as Doc, John Bentley as Officer Krupke / Understudy for Lt. Schrank, Allen Walker Lane as Gladhand / Understudy for Doc / Understudy for Officer Krupke, Daniel P. Hannafin as Lt. Schrank, Jose-Luis Lopez, Jr. as A-Rab / Understudy for Baby John, Steve Scionti as Action, Steve McClain as Big Deal / Understudy for Gladhand, Jeffrey Lee Broadhurst as Snowboy / Understudy for Riff / Understudy for Big Deal & Joe Langworth as Baby John)
- Jesus Christ Superstar (July 2–8). (featuring Stephen Lehew as Jesus of Nazareth, Milton Craig Nealy as Judas Iscariot, Bertilla Baker as Mary Magdalene, Alex Santoriello as Pontius Pilate / Understudy for Judas Iscariot, Robert Frisch as Caiaphas, Danny Zolli as Annas / Understudy for Jesus of Nazareth, Kent Dalian as Peter, Bobby Lee Daye as Simon Zealotes & Patrick Lane as King Herod)
- Bye Bye Birdie (July 9–15). (featuring Tommy Tune as Albert Peterson, Ann Reinking as Rose Alvarez, Kevin Blair as Conrad Birdie, Marcia Lewis as Mae Peterson, Susan Egan as Kim MacAfee, Alan Sues as Mr. Harry MacAfee, Belle Calaway as Mrs. Doris MacAfee, Katherine Heasley as Ursula Merkle, Andrew Volpe as Randolph MacAfee, Brent Sudduth as Hugo Peabody, Christina Hammersmith as Gloria Rasputin, Gerald Quinn as The Mayor, Pat Vern Harris as The Mayor's Wife, Jane Pisarkiewicz as Mrs. Merkle & John Contini as Charles F. Maude)
- Rodgers and Hammerstein's Cinderella on Ice (July 23–29). (featuring Rachelle Ottley as Cinderella, Robin Cousins as Prince Christopher, Nancy Dussault as The Fairy Godmother, Gretchen Wyler as The Stepmother, Adolph Green as King Maximilian, Phyllis Newman as Queen Constantina, Barbara Sharma as Joy, Lois Foraker as Portia, Cliff Bemis as The Herald, Neal Frederiksen as The Steward & Michael Jokerst as Chef)
- Brigadoon (July 30 – August 5). (featuring Joel Higgins as Tommy Albright, Victoria Mallory as Fiona MacLaren, John James as Jeff Douglas, KT Sullivan as Meg Brockie, Edward Ellison as Harry Beaton, Tom O'Brien as Charlie Dalrymple, Joneal Joplin as Mr. Lundie, Louise Hickey as Jean MacLaren, Laurie Gamache as Maggie Anderson, John E. Peters as Andrew MacLaren, Shaver Tillitt as Angus MacGuffie, Gerald Quinn as Archie Beaton, Beth Baur as Jane Ashton / Understudy for Meg Brockie, John Contini as Stuart Dalrymple / Understudy for Jeff Douglas, Rich Pisarkiewicz as Frank & Robert Earl Gleason as Sandy Dean)
- No, No, Nanette (August 6–12). (featuring Carol Lawrence as Lucille Early, Van Johnson as Jimmy Smith, Barbara Sharma as Pauline, Marge Champion as Sue Smith, Susan Egan as Nanette, Jim Walton as Tom Trainor, Lara Teeter as Billy Early, Ann Morrison as Winnie Winslow, Gigi Rice as Flora Latham & Tudi Roche as Betty Brown)
- Little Shop of Horrors ^{MP} (August 13–19). (featuring Adrian Zmed as Seymour Krelborn, Marsha Waterbury as Audrey, Eddie Bracken as Mr. Mushnik, Ken Land as Orin Scrivello DDS / Bernstein / Mrs. Luce / Snip / Others, Michael Mandell as Audrey II (Voice), Jozie Hill as Ronnette, Tena Wilson as Crystal, Moné Walton as Chiffon & Kurt Carley as Audrey II (Puppeteer))

=== 1991 (Season 73) ===
- It's Delightful, It's Delovely, It's Cole Porter ^{R} (June 10-16). (featuring Kaye Ballard, Rebecca Baxter, James Brennan, Pascale Faye-Williams, Stephen Lehew, Karen Morrow, Phyllis Newman, Steve Ross, Patrick Taverna)
- Kiss Me, Kate ^{91a} (June 17–23). (featuring Joel Higgins as Fred Graham / Petruchio, Victoria Mallory as Lilli Vanessi / Katherine, Dorothy Stanley as Lois Lane / Bianca, Donn Simione as Bill Calhoun / Lucentio, John Remme as First Man, Barry Dennen as Second Man, Joneal Joplin as Harry Trevor / Baptista, Brad Holiday as Harrison Howell, Grady Smith as Paul, Jeanne Trevor as Hattie, Michael Lee Wright as Gremio, Robert Winn Austin as Hortensio, John Contini as Ralph, Roland Harris as Cab Driver & Robert Earl Gleason as Haberdasher)
- Hans Christian Andersen (July 8–14). (featuring Michael Feinstein as Hans Christian Andersen, Cynthia Ferrer as Madame Doro, Lenny Wolpe as Peter, George Deloy as Niels, John Remme as Otto, Joneal Joplin as Editor Holm, Edward Ellison as Premier Danseur, Brad Holiday as The Schoolmaster, Gerald Quinn as Dr. Foss & Grady Smith as The Burgomaster)
- 42nd Street (July 15–21). (featuring Gary Holcombe as Julian Marsh, Gretchen Wyler as Dorothy Brock, Jeanna Marie Schweppe as Peggy Sawyer, Lee Roy Reams as Billy Lawlor, Toni Lamond as Maggie Jones, William Alan Coats as Andy Lee, Debra Ann Draper as Anytime Annie, Brandt Edwards as Pat Denning, Don Crabtree as Abner Dillon, John Contini as Mac, Candy Cook as Phyllis, Tara Anderson as Lorraine & Neal Frederiksen as Oscar)
- I Do! I Do! (July 22–28). (featuring John Davidson as Michael & Judy Kaye as Agnes)
- Mame (July 29 – August 4). (featuring Mariette Hartley as Mame Dennis, Gretchen Wyler as Vera Charles, Georgia Engel as Agnes Gooch, Duffy Huebschmann as Young Patrick Dennis / Peter Dennis, John Scherer as Older Patrick Dennis, Ronald Young as Beauregard Jackson Pickett Burnside, Alan Muraoka as Ito, Alan Carey as Dwight Babcock, Hollis Huston as M. Lindsay Woolsey, Kari Ely as Mme. Branislowski / Mrs. Upson, Jane Pisarkiewicz as Mother Burnside, Marjie Carr-Oxley as Sally Cato, Beth Baur as Gloria Upson, Michael Jokerst as Leading Man / Ralph Devine, James Anthony as Mr. Upson & Tamara Tungate as Art Model / Pegeen Ryan)
- My Fair Lady (August 12–18). (featuring John Neville as Henry Higgins, Christine Andreas as Eliza Doolittle, Clive Revill as Alfred P. Doolittle, James Valentine as Colonel Pickering, Patricia Drylie as Mrs. Higgins, Kevin Dearinger as Freddy Eynsford-Hill, Sylvia Gassell as Mrs. Pearce, David Holliday as Zolton Karparthy / Understudy for Henry Higgins, Celia Tackaberry as Mrs. Eynsford Hill / Mrs. Hopkins / Understudy for Mrs. Higgins, Charles Goff as Lord Boxington / Harry / Understudy for Alfred P. Doolittle & Andrew Boyer as Jamie / Understudy for Colonel Pickering / Understudy for Zolton Karparthy)

^91a One of 22 productions, during her lifetime, featuring longtime St. Louis jazz singer Jeanne Trevor.

=== 1992 (Season 74) ===
- South Pacific (June 22–28). (featuring Leslie Denniston as Ensign Nellie Forbush, Howard Keel as Emile de Becque, Camille Saviola as Bloody Mary, Nat Chandler as Lt. Joseph Cable, Todd Susman as Luther Billis, Barb Chan as Liat, Grady Smith as Capt. George Brackett, Joneal Joplin as Cdr. William Harbison, Whit Reichert as Stewpot, Jeb Brown as Professor, Natalie DeLucia as Ngana & Robert Jason Friedman as Jerome)
- Pump Boys and Dinettes ^{MP} ((July 6–12). (featuring Gary Bristol as Eddie, Jonathan Edwards as Jim, John Foley as Jackson, Dawn Hopper as Prudie Cupp, Cass Morgan as Rhetta Cupp & Shawn Stengel as L.M.)
- Show Boat (July 13–19). (featuring Victoria Mallory as Magnolia Hawks, Joel Higgins as Gaylord Ravenal, Eileen Barnett as Julie La Verne, Gavin MacLeod as Cap'n Andy Hawks, June Squibb as Parthy Ann Hawks, Michel Bell as Joe, Yvette Freeman as Queenie, Michele Burdette-Elmore as Ellie May Shipley, Keith Savage as Frank Schultz, Robert Earl Gleason as Steve Baker, Melissa Davis as Kim, Shaver Tillitt as Pete / Charley, Harper MacKay as Windy / Jake, Al Checco as Vallon / Standby for Cap'n Andy Hawks, Monica Dickhens as Mother Superior / Lottie & Debby Lennon as Dolly)
- The Wizard of Oz (July 20–26). (featuring Emily Loesser as Dorothy Gale, Gordon Connell as Professor Marvel / The Wizard of Oz, Dirk Lumbard as Hunk / The Scarecrow, James Young as Hickory / The Tin Man, Evan Bell as Zeke / The Cowardly Lion, Phyllis Diller as Miss Gulch / The Wicked Witch of the West, Carol Dilley as Aunt Em / Glinda & Joneal Joplin as Uncle Henry / Guardian of the Gates)
- Hello, Dolly! (July 27 – August 2). (featuring Madeline Kahn as Dolly Gallagher Levi, John Schuck as Horace Vandergelder, James Darrah as Cornelius Hackl, Colleen Fitzpatrick as Irene Molloy, Frank Parr as Barnaby Tucker, Lori Ann Mahl as Minnie Fay, Margery Lowe as Ermengarde, Thomas Miller as Ambrose Kemper, Marsha Carlton as Ernestina, Michael Carlson as Rudolph, Kim Bowers-Rheay as Mrs. Rose & Bill Bateman as The Judge)
- George M! (August 3–9). (featuring Joel Grey as George M. Cohan, Barry Preston as Jerry Cohan, Jeanna Marie Schweppe as Ethel Levey, Gretchen Wyler as Nellie Cohan, Mary Munger as Agnes Nolan / Madam Grimaldi, Cathy Wydner as Josie Cohan, Susan Powell as Fay Templeton, James Haskins as Sam Harris / Behman & Michael Stanek as Walt / Man on Curtain)
- The Music of Andrew Lloyd Webber ^{MP} (August 10–16). (featuring Rita Baretta, Eric Bennyhoff, Jennifer Blackhurst, Brigid Brady, Tom Donoghue, Lindsay Dyett, D. Michael Heath, Walker Keeling, Kris Phillips, C.E. Smith, Julie Waldman-Stiel & Elizabeth Ward)

=== 1993 (Season 75) ===
- The Sound of Music (June 21–27). (featuring Christine Andreas as Maria, Ken Kercheval as Captain Georg von Trapp, Marni Nixon as The Mother Abbess, Barry Dennen as Max Detweiler, Victoria Clark as Baroness Elsa Schrader, Leanna Polk as Liesl von Trapp, Richard Roland as Rolf Gruber, Cory Davis as Friedrich von Trapp, Kara Driscoll as Louisa von Trapp, Jacob Laws as Kurt von Trapp, Caroline Holmes as Brigitta von Trapp, Marta Cahill as Marta von Trapp, Jessica Kohut as Gretl von Trapp, John Contini as Franz, Kari Ely as Frau Schmidt, Harry C. Gibbs as Admiral von Scheriber, Tom Murray as Herr Zeller, Debby Lennon as Sister Sophia, Jennifer Warren-Bielawski as Sister Berthe & Monica Dickhens as Sister Margaretta)
- Annie Get Your Gun (July 5–11). (featuring Cathy Rigby as Annie Oakley, Brent Barrett as Frank Butler, Erick Devine as Colonel Buffalo Bill Cody, Paul V. Ames as Charlie Davenport, Mauricio Bustamante as Chief Sitting Bull, KT Sullivan as Dolly Tate, Mike O'Carroll as Foster Wilson / Pawnee Bill, Ryan Mason as Little Jake & Theresa McCoy as Nellie Oakley)
- Grease (July 12–18). (featuring Rex Smith as Danny Zuko, Caryn Richman as Sandy Dumbrowski, Courtenay Collins as Betty Rizzo, Peter Reardon as Kenickie, Yvette Lawrence as Frenchy, Cathy Trien as Marty, Rhoda Griffis as Jan, David Pevsner as Sonny Latierri, Mickey Nugent as Doody, Mark Santoro as Roger, Muriel Moore as Miss Lynch, Hal Davis as Vince Fontaine, Barry Tarallo as Johnny Casino / Teen Angel & Catherine Larson as Patty Simcox)
- Peter Pan (July 19–25). (featuring Emily Loesser as Peter Pan, Ron Holgate as Mr. Darling / Captain Hook, Pauline Frommer as Wendy Darling / Jane, Mary Ruprecht as Mrs. Darling / Wendy (Grown-Up), Barry Dennen as Mr. Smee, Brian Elliot as John Darling, Daniel J. Livengood as Michael Darling, Laurie Gamache as Tiger Lily, Melissa O'Neill as Liza, Dan Porzel as Nana / The Crocodile, Matthew Ottenlips as Tootles, David True as Slightly, Miguel Marling as Curley, Sean M. Kirkland as Nibs, John Huber as 1st Twin & Michael Huber as 2nd Twin)
- Fiddler on the Roof (July 26 – August 1). (featuring Theodore Bikel as Tevye, Marilyn Sokol as Golde, Ruth Jaroslow as Yente, S. Marc Jordan as Lazar Wolf, Karen Needle as Tzeitel, Susan Hoffman as Hodel, Jennifer Naimo as Chava, Ira Denmark as Motel, Robert Michael Baker as Perchik, Brian Henry as Fyedka, Anna Marie Reby as Shprintze, Jesseca Shaw as Bielke, Rich Pisarkiewicz as Mordcha, Neal Frederiksen as Rabbi, Joe Arnold as Mendel, Tom Murray as Avram, Michael Holmes as Nachum, Jane Pisarkiewicz as Grandma Tzeitel, Kari Ely as Fruma-Sarah, John Contini as Constable & Dean Christopher as The Fiddler)
- Oliver! (August 2–8). (featuring Davy Jones as Fagin, Roman Sienkiewicz & David Watson as Oliver Twist, Donna Murphy as Nancy, William Parry as Bill Sikes, Rick Faugno as The Artful Dodger, Farnham Scott as Mr. Bumble, Gary Holcombe as Mr. Brownlow, Mary Stout as Widow Corney, Keith Perry as Mr. Sowerberry / Dr. Grimwig, Diane Daniels Ciesla as Mrs. Sowerberry / Old Sally & Joanne McHugh as Bet)
- Oklahoma! (August 9–15). (featuring Nat Chandler as Curly, Emily Loesser as Laurey, June Squibb as Aunt Eller, Jeff McCarthy as Jud Fry, Sally Mayes as Ado Annie Carnes, Lara Teeter as Will Parker, Joe Sicari as Ali Hakim, Joneal Joplin as Andrew "Papa" Carnes, Michele Burdette-Elmore as Gertie Cummings, Rich Pisarkiewicz as Ike Skidmore, Randall Graham as Dream Curly & Susannah Israel as Dream Laurey)

=== 1994 (Season 76) ===
- The King and I (June 20–26). (featuring Leslie Denniston as Anna Leonowens, Robert Westenberg as The King of Siam, Susan Hoffman as Tuptim, Jason Ma as Lun Tha, Reveka Mavrovitis as Lady Thiang, George Kmeck as The Kralahome, Graham Kostic as Louis Leonowens, Miguel Marling as Prince Chulalongkorn & James Anthony as Captain Orton / Sir Edward Ramsay)
- Ain't Misbehavin' ^{MP} (July 4–10). (featuring Ken Page, Donnell Aarone, Yvette Freeman, Julia Lema & Cynthia Thomas)
- Cats (July 11–17). (featuring Mary Gutzi as Grizabella, John Treacy Egan as Old Deuteronomy, Bobby Amirante as Munkustrap, Richard Poole as Bustopher Jones / Asparagus / Growltiger, Ron DeVito as Rum Tum Tugger, Christopher Gattelli as Mr. Mistoffelees, Alice C. DeChant as Jennyanydots, Mickey Nugent as Skimbleshanks, Helen Frank as Bombalurina, N. Elaine Wiggins as Demeter, Gavan Pamer as Mungojerrie, Maria Jo Ralabate as Rumpleteazer, Taylor Wicker as Plato / Macavity, Kirstie Tice as Victoria, Laura Quinn as Cassandra, Lanene Charters as Sillabub, Patty Goble as Jellylorum / Griddlebone, Tim Hunter as Tumblebrutus & William Patrick Dunne as Alonzo / Rumpus Cat)
- Annie (July 18–24). (featuring Natalie DeLucia as Annie, Gary Holcombe as Oliver "Daddy" Warbucks, Rue McClanahan as Miss Hannigan, Jacquelyn Piro Donovan as Grace Farrell, Jeb Brown as Rooster Hannigan, Jennifer Smith as Lily St. Regis, Marjorie Failoni as Molly, Jacqueline Fitzgerald as Pepper, Karen Piane as Kate, Stephanie Hickman as Duffy, Denise Piane as July, Allison Mezger as Tessie, Tracey Moore as Star to Be & Joneal Joplin as FDR)
- Seven Brides for Seven Brothers (July 25–31). (featuring Stephen Lehew as Adam Pontipee, Victoria Mallory as Milly, Jim T. Ruttman as Benjamin Pontipee, Malcolm Perry as Caleb Pontipee, Michael Lee Wright as Daniel Pontipee, Stephen Casey as Ephraim Pontipee, Sean Greenan as Frank Pontipee, Ian Knauer as Gideon Pontipee, Neal Frederiksen as Mr. Bixby & Monica Dickhens as Mrs. Bixby)
- Meet Me in St. Louis (August 1–7). (featuring Kathleen Rowe McAllen as Esther Smith, Jessica Kohut as Tootie Smith, James Clow as John Truitt, Joneal Joplin as Mr. Alonzo Smith, Jeannie Carson as Mrs. Anna Smith, Biff McGuire as Grandpa Prophater, Jenny O'Hara as Katie, Marguerite Shannon as Rose Smith, Jeb Brown as Lon Smith, Caroline Holmes as Agnes Smith & Gia Grazia Valenti as Lucille Ballard)
- The Music Man (August 8–14). (featuring Joel Higgins as Harold Hill, Elizabeth Walsh as Marian Paroo, June Squibb as Mrs. Paroo, Lee Wilkof as Marcellus Washburn, James Anthony as Mayor Shinn, Patti Allison as Eulalie MacKecknie Shinn, Daniel Estrin as Winthrop Paroo, Brad Aspel as Tommy Djilas, Leanna Polk as Zanetta Shinn, Johanna Elkana as Amarylis, Joneal Joplin as Charlie Cowell, Rick Knight as Ewart Dunlop, Rob Henry as Oliver Hix, Jim Henry as Olin Britt, Kipp Buckner as Jacey Squires, Tracey Moore as Ethel Toffelmier, Lynn Humphrey as Alma Hix & Heather Schmidt as Gracie Shinn)

=== 1995 (Season 77) ===
- The Music of Andrew Lloyd Webber (June 19-25). (featuring Sarah Brightman, Seán Martin Hingston, Kris Phillips, Francis Ruivivar, Kelli Severson, Amy Splitt, Alice Vienneau, Stuart Marland & Susan Spencer)
- An Evening of Operetta with the St. Louis Symphony ^{C} ^{95a} (June 26 - July 2). (featuring Lee Merrill as Hanna Glawari, Nat Chandler as Count Danilo Danilowitsch, Erie Mills as Valencienne, William Burden as Camille de Rossillon & Paul Blake as The Narrator)
- Man of La Mancha (July 3-9) (featuring John Cullum as Miguel de Cervantes / Don Quixote, Ann Crumb as Aldonza / Dulcinea, Darryl Ferrera as Sancho Panza, Tony Gilbertson as Dr. Carrasco, David Holliday as The Innkeeper, David Wasson as The Padre, Rebecca Spencer as Antonia, Marceline Decker as The Housekeeper, Ted Forlow as The Barber, Robert Ousley as Captain of the Inquisition, Chev Rodgers as The Governor, Jean-Paul Richard as Anselmo, Antony DeVecchi as Pedro, Linda Cameron as Maria & Elise Hernàndez as Fermina)
- Cinderella (July 10–16). (featuring Dana Lynn Caruso as Cinderella, Jon Marshall Sharp as Prince Christopher, Georgia Engel as The Fairy Godmother, Phyllis Diller as The Stepmother, George D. Wallace as King Maximilian, Jane A. Johnston as Queen Constantina, Jan Neuberger as Joy, Susann Fletcher as Portia, Rich Pisarkiewicz as The Herald & Tara Lee as Dream Cinderella)
- Singin' in the Rain (July 17–23). (featuring Lara Teeter as Don Lockwood, Randy Rogel as Cosmo Brown, Christina Saffran Ashford as Kathy Seldon, Nancy Ringham as Lina Lamont, Ray Reinhardt as R. F. Simpson, Alan Sues as Roscoe Dexter, Adam Pickles as Young Don Lockwood, Drew Sobey as Young Cosmo Brown, Gia Grazia Valenti as Zelda Zanders, Kari Ely as Dora Bailey / Phoebe Dinsmore, John Contini as Rod Phillips, Kyle Pickles as Sound Engineer, John Meurer as "Beautiful Girl" Tenor & Elizabeth Parkinson as Olga Mara / Featured Dancer)
- Godspell (July 24–30). (featuring Don Goodspeed as Jesus, Frank Kosik as Judas Iscariot / John the Baptist, Adinah Alexander, Stephanie J. Block, Nick Corley, Erin Dilly, Randy Donaldson, Renée Elise Goldsberry, Manu Narayan & Julie Prosser)
- Camelot (July 31 – August 6). (featuring John Rubinstein as King Arthur, Leslie Denniston as Guinevere, Nat Chandler as Lancelot, Jeb Brown as Mordred, Ken Page as King Pellinore, Joneal Joplin as Merlyn, Rich Pisarkiewicz as Dinadan, Lindsey McKee as Nimue & Daniel Estrin as Tom of Warwick)
- West Side Story (August 7–13). (featuring Christine Toy as Maria, Lewis Cleale as Tony, Susann Fletcher as Anita, Michael Gruber as Riff, Luis Perez as Bernardo, Rommel Gopez as Chino, Joneal Joplin as Doc, Rich Pisarkiewicz as Officer Krupke, Alan Knoll as Gladhand, Tom Murray as Lt. Schrank, Jeremy Czarniak as A-Rab, George M. Livengood as Action, Karl duHoffmann as Big Deal, Billy Sprague, Jr. as Snowboy & Roderick Keller as Baby John)

^95a Production featuring a concert staging of The Merry Widow.

=== 1996 (Season 78) ===
- My Fair Lady (June 17–23). (featuring Howard Keel as Henry Higgins, Leslie Denniston as Eliza Doolittle, Lee Roy Reams as Alfred P. Doolittle, Raye Birk as Colonel Pickering, Diana Douglas as Mrs. Higgins, Michael Greenwood as Freddy Eynsford-Hill, June Squibb as Mrs. Pearce, Robert Earl Gleason as Zolton Karparthy, Lindsey McKee as Mrs. Eynsford Hill / Mrs. Hopkins, Rich Pisarkiewicz as Lord Boxington / Jamie & Tom Murray as Harry)
- Jesus Christ Superstar (June 24–30). (featuring Eric Kunze as Jesus of Nazareth, Christopher Sieber as Judas Iscariot, Christina Saffran as Mary Magdalene, Darrin Baker as Pontius Pilate, Kelly Houston as Caiaphas, Michael Kaer Miller as Annas, Christopher Lewis as Peter, Rohn Seykell as Simon Zealotes & Gerry McIntyre as King Herod)
- The Desert Song in Concert ^{C} (July 1-7). (featuring Nat Chandler as Pierre Birabeau / Red Shadow, Maureen Brennan as Margot, Alan Sues as Bennie, Paul Blake as The Narrator, Rich Pisarkiewicz as Sid El Kar, Brian Downen as Captain Paul Fontaine, Kari Ely as Azuri, Joneal Joplin as General Birabeau, Christina Saffran as Susan & Sam Mungo as Ali Ben Ali)
- Little Shop of Horrors (July 8–14). (featuring Jeb Brown as Seymour Krelborn, Anne Torsiglieri as Audrey, Todd Susman as Mr. Mushnik, Lara Teeter as Orin Scrivello DDS / Bernstein / Mrs. Luce / Snip / Others, Michael James Leslie as Audrey II (Voice), Kimberly R. Hebert as Ronnette, La Tonya Holmes as Crystal, Dioni Michelle Collins as Chiffon & Ed Fusco as Audrey II (Puppeteer))
- Sleeping Beauty ^{WP} ^{96a} (July 15-21). (featuring Georgia Engel as Madame Sophie, Emily Loesser as Sunny, Lewis Cleale as Maxwell, Lee Roy Reams as King Oscar, Ken Page as The Voice of Wendell, Marcia Lewis as Francine, Don Stephenson as Tommy, Joneal Joplin as King Leo & Rich Pisarkiewicz as Barry)
- Guys and Dolls (July 22–28). (featuring Joel Higgins as Sky Masterson, Victoria Mallory as Sarah Brown, Bruce Adler as Nathan Detroit, Nancy Ringham as Miss Adelaide, Kevin Ligon as Nicely-Nicely Johnson, Christopher Sieber as Benny Southstreet, Peggy King as Arvide Brown, Tom Murray as Big Jule, Ron Himes as General Cartwright, John Contini as Harry the Horse & Wayne Salomon as Lt. Brannigan)
- Evita (July 29 – August 4). (featuring Valerie Perri as Eva Perón, John Herrera as Che, David Wasson as Juan Perón, Buddy Crutchfield as Agustín Magaldi & Elisa Sagardia as Perón's Mistress)
- 42nd Street (August 5–11). (featuring Ron Holgate as Julian Marsh, Karen Morrow as Dorothy Brock, Paige Price as Peggy Sawyer, James Darrah as Billy Lawlor, Lenora Nemetz as Maggie Jones, Don Percassi as Andy Lee, Dana Moore as Anytime Annie, Michael Kaer Miller as Pat Denning, Wayne Salomon as Abner Dillon, John Contini as Mac, Michele Tibbitts as Phyllis, Annie Yarbrough as Lorraine & J. Scott Matthews as Oscar)

^96a Adaptation of the fairy tale by executive producer Paul Blake, utilizing songs by Sammy Cahn.

=== 1997 (Season 79) ===
- Joseph and the Amazing Technicolor Dreamcoat (June 16–22). (featuring Eric Kunze as Joseph, Mary Gordon Murray as The Narrator, Jeb Brown as The Pharaoh & James Anthony as Jacob / Potiphar)
- Funny Girl (June 23–29). (featuring Janet Metz as Fanny Brice, Patrick Quinn as Nick Arnstein, Kaye Ballard as Mrs. Brice, Lee Roy Reams as Eddie Ryan, Joneal Joplin as Florenz Ziegfeld Jr., June Squibb as Mrs. Strakosh, Jeanne Trevor as Emma, Tom Murray as Tom Keeney & Zoe Vonder Haar as Mrs. Meeker)
- Three Coins in the Fountain ^{WP} ^{97a} (July 7-13). (featuring Joel Higgins as John Frederick Shadwell, Leslie Denniston as Frances Bertin, Maureen Brennan as Anita Hutchins, Lara Teeter as Phil, Michele Pawk as Ginny, James Clow as Giorgio Bianchi, Ray Fournie as Rudolfo, Wayne Salomon as Wayne Arnold & Robert Earl Gleason, Michael Kaer Miller and Rich Pisarkiewicz as The Street Vendors)
- The Wizard of Oz (July 14–20). (featuring Natalie DeLucia as Dorothy Gale, Bob Keeshan as Professor Marvel / The Wizard of Oz, Lara Teeter as Hunk / The Scarecrow, John Sloman as Hickory / The Tin Man, Ken Page as Zeke / The Cowardly Lion, Marilyn Sokol as Miss Gulch / The Wicked Witch of the West, Lisby Larson as Glinda, Zoe Vonder Haar as Aunt Em & Joneal Joplin as Uncle Henry / Guardian of the Gates)
- A Chorus Line ^{97b} (June 21–27). (featuring Michael Danek as Zach, Laurie Gamache as Cassie, Mark Krupinski as Larry, Evan Marks as Mike, Michele Pawk as Sheila, Deborah Leamy as Bebe, Angela Christian as Maggie, Tom Titone as Al, Kim Shriver as Kristine, Cindy Marchionda as Diana, Jill Powell as Val, Eric Paeper as Paul, Sachi Shimizu as Connie, Casey Colgan as Bobby, Perry Laylon Ojeda as Don, Britt Freund as Mark, Jennifer Paige Chambers as Judy, K. Lumumba Short as Richie & Kevin LaMura as Greg)
- South Pacific (July 28 – August 3). (featuring Nancy Ringham as Ensign Nellie Forbush, Walter Charles as Emile de Becque, Armelia McQueen as Bloody Mary, Lewis Cleale as Lt. Joseph Cable, Bruce Adler as Luther Billis, Stephanie A. Reeve as Liat, Wayne Salomon as Capt. George Brackett, James Anthony as Cdr. William Harbison, Tom Murray as Stewpot, Geoffrey Soffer as Professor, Julia Bullock as Ngana & James Larsen as Jerome)
- Hello, Dolly! (August 4–10). (featuring Gretchen Wyler as Dolly Gallagher Levi, Joneal Joplin as Horace Vandergelder, Lewis Cleale as Cornelius Hackl, Victoria Mallory as Irene Molloy, Britt Freund as Barnaby Tucker, Lori Ann Mahl as Minnie Fay, Gia Grazia Valenti as Ermengarde, Perry Laylon Ojeda as Ambrose Kemper, Monica Dickhens as Ernestina, Rich Pisarkiewicz as Rudolph, Kari Ely as Mrs. Rose & Wayne Salomon as The Judge)

^97a World Premiere adaptation of the 1954 film.
^97b Production featuring original direction and choreography recreated by Mitzi Hamilton.

=== 1998 (Season 80) ===
- Oklahoma! (June 15–21). (featuring James Clow as Curly, Andréa Burns as Laurey, June Squibb as Aunt Eller, Mark Lotito as Jud Fry, Nancy Ringham as Ado Annie Carnes, John Bolton as Will Parker, Bruce Adler as Ali Hakim, Joneal Joplin as Andrew "Papa" Carnes, Courtney Leigh Stanford as Gertie Cummings, Travis Turpin as Ike Skidmore, Randall Graham as Dream Curly & Callye Andra Robinson as Dream Laurey)
- Bye Bye Birdie (June 22–28). (featuring Lee Roy Reams as Albert Peterson, Mary Gordon Murray as Rose Alvarez, Jeb Brown as Conrad Birdie, Marilyn Cooper as Mae Peterson, Amy Eidelman as Kim MacAfee, James Anthony as Mr. Harry MacAfee, Marsha Waterbury as Mrs. Doris MacAfee, Casey Erin Daniel as Ursula Merkle, Daniel Estrin as Randolph MacAfee, Noah Weisberg as Hugo Peabody, Lisa Howard as Gloria Rasputin, Tom Murray as The Mayor, Zoe Vonder Haar as The Mayor's Wife, Monica Dickhens as Mrs. Merkle & Rich Pisarkiewicz as Charles F. Maude)
- The Radio City Rockettes Muny Spectacular ^{R} ^{98a} (July 6–12). (featuring Maureen Brennan, Alisa Gyse, Eric Kunze, Ken Page, Lee Roy Reams, Franklin Gamero, Iliana Lopez, Kristine Mezines & Bob Moore)
- Peter Pan (July 13–19). (featuring Cathy Rigby as Peter Pan, Paul Schoeffler as Mr. Darling / Captain Hook, Elisa Sagardia as Wendy Darling, Barbara McCulloh as Mrs. Darling / Wendy (Grown-Up), Michael Nostrand as Mr. Smee, Chase Kniffen as John Darling, Drake English as Michael Darling, Dana Solimando as Liza / Tiger Lily, Buck Mason as Nana / The Crocodile, Aileen Quinn as Tootles / Jane, Scott Bridges as Slightly, Alon Williams as Curley, Janet Higgins as 1st Twin & Doreen Chila as 2nd Twin)
- Fiddler on the Roof (July 20–26). (featuring Theodore Bikel as Tevye, Rebecca Hoodwin as Golde, Lola Powers as Yente, Gary Holcombe as Lazar Wolf, Eileen Tepper as Tzeitel, Jennifer Prescott as Hodel, Dana Lynn Caruso as Chava, Michael Iannucci as Motel, Daniel Cooney as Perchik, Robert T. Miller as Fyedka, Cassie Chesnutt as Shprintze, Karen Piane as Bielke, David Masters as Mordcha / Nachum, Neal Frederiksen as Rabbi, Donnie Keshawarz as Mendel, John Contini as Avram, Jody Anderson as Grandma Tzeitel, Heidi Gutknecht as Fruma-Sarah, Robert Frisch as Constable & Bat Abbit as The Fiddler)
- Crazy for You ^{MP} (July 27 – August 2). (featuring Jim Walton as Bobby Child, Paige Price as Polly Baker, Bruce Adler as Bela Zangler, Lisa Howard as Irene Roth, Gary Holcombe as Lank Hawkins, John Freimann as Everett Baker, June Squibb as Mother (Lottie Child), James Anthony as Eugene Fodor, Kari Ely as Patricia Fodor, Jeanna Marie Schweppe as Tess, Gary Glasgow as Custus / Perkins, Rich Pisarkiewicz as Pete / Wyatt, George Smallwood as Harry / Roof Specialty, Travis Turpin as Moose & Britt Freund as Sam)
- Damn Yankees (August 3–9). (featuring Joel Higgins as Mr. Applegate, Christina Saffran Ashford as Lola, Marcus Chait as Joe Hardy, Joan Marshall as Meg Boyd, Susann Fletcher as Gloria Thorpe, Peter Palmer as Joe Boyd, Ken Page as Van Buren, Joneal Joplin as Welch, Lola Powers as Sister, Tom Murray as Postmaster, Noah Weisberg as Rocky, Casey Nicholaw as Smokey, Jason Robinson as Sohovik & Zoe Vonder Haar as Doris)

^98a Special 80th Season Revue featuring the Radio City Rockettes.

=== 1999 (Season 81) ===
- Grease (June 21–27). (featuring Christopher Sieber as Danny Zuko, Lauren Kennedy as Sandy Dumbrowski, Liz Larsen as Betty Rizzo, Sallie Viviano as Kenickie, Liza Lapira as Frenchy, Casey Erin Daniel as Marty, Lisa Howard as Jan, Damien Brett as Sonny Latierri, Jeff Edgerton as Doody, Noah Weisberg as Roger, Marilyn Sokol as Miss Lynch, James Anthony as Vince Fontaine, Ken Page as Teen Angel & Amanda May as Patty Simcox)
- The King and I (July 5–11). (featuring Leslie Denniston as Anna Leonowens, Richard Muenz as The King of Siam, Stephanie Park as Tuptim, Nat Chandler as Lun Tha, Reveka Mavrovitis as Lady Thiang, Joneal Joplin as The Kralahome, Samuel Weller as Louis Leonowens, Miguel Marling as Prince Chulalongkorn & James Anthony as Captain Orton / Sir Edward Ramsay)
- Annie (July 12–18). (featuring Natalie DeLucia as Annie, Gary Holcombe as Oliver "Daddy" Warbucks, Elmarie Wendel as Miss Hannigan, Kim Lindsay as Grace Farrell, Casey Nicholaw as Rooster Hannigan, Jeanna Marie Schweppe as Lily St. Regis, Natalie Ann Bram as Molly, Lauren-Ashleigh Owen as Pepper, Erin Dowling as Kate, Ashley Colón as Duffy, Sarah Cline as July, Kaitlyn Davidson as Tessie, Nikki Renee Daniels as Star to Be & Gary Glasgow as FDR)
- The Muny Goes British ^{R} ^{99a} (July 19–25). (featuring Nat Chandler, Stacey Logan, Karen Mason, Judy McLane, Sarah Pfisterer, Steve Ross, Lara Teeter & Ozzie Smith)
- 1776 (July 26 – August 1). (featuring Robert Westenberg as John Adams, Jay Garner as Benjamin Franklin, Jeb Brown as Thomas Jefferson, Mark Jacoby as John Dickinson, Gary Beach as Richard Henry Lee, Charles Pistone as Edward Rutledge, Victoria Mallory as Abigail Adams, Andréa Burns as Martha Jefferson, Wayne Salomon as Stephen Hopkins, Joneal Joplin as John Hancock, Ray Fournie as Roger Sherman, John Freimann as Andrew McNair, Tom O'Brien as Robert Livingston, Tom Murray as Samuel Chase, Darryl Ferrera as James Wilson, Mark Baker as George Read, Gary Lee Reed as Caesar Rodney, Doug Carfrae as Charles Thomson, Christopher Lewis as Lewis Morris, Robert Bartley as John Witherspoon, John Contini as Thomas McKean, Joe Reynolds as Lyman Hall, Robert Earl Gleason as Josiah Bartlett, Neal Frederiksen as Joseph Hewes, Zachary Halley as Leather Apron & Randy Harrison as Courier)
- Anything Goes (August 2–8). (featuring Karen Morrow as Reno Sweeney, Lara Teeter as Billy Crocker, Bruce Adler as Moonface Martin, Stephen Temperley as Lord Evelyn Oakleigh, Jessica Walling as Hope Harcourt, Susann Fletcher as Bonnie, Sara Dillon as Mrs. Evangeline Harcourt, Joneal Joplin as Elisha J. Whitney, Tom Murray as Captain, John Contini as Ship’s Purser, Wayne Salomon as Steward)
- Meet Me in St. Louis (August 9–15). (featuring Emily Loesser as Esther Smith, Natalie Ann Bram as Tootie Smith, Eric Kunze as John Truitt, Walter Charles as Mr. Alonzo Smith, Jo Sullivan Loesser as Mrs. Anna Smith, John Freimann as Grandpa Prophater, Georgia Engel as Katie, Kim Lindsay as Rose Smith, Don Stephenson as Lon Smith, Erin Dowling as Agnes Smith & Amanda May as Lucille Ballard)

^99a Revue written by executive producer Paul Blake compiling the many works of British songwriters such as Andrew Lloyd Webber and Lionel Bart.

== 2000s ==
=== 2000 (Season 82) ===
- West Side Story (June 19–25). (featuring Sarah Uriarte Berry as Maria, Eric Kunze as Tony, Laurie Gamache as Anita, Noah Racey as Riff, David Marques as Bernardo, Raphael Alvarez as Chino, Joneal Joplin as Doc, James Anthony as Officer Krupke, Gary Glasgow as Gladhand, John Contini as Lt. Schrank, Charlie Brady as A-Rab, David Patrick Ford as Action, Aaron Douglas Smith as Big Deal, Jeffrey J. Bateman as Snowboy & Roderick Keller as Baby John)
- An Evening of Richard Rodgers ^{R} ^{2000a} (July 3–9). (featuring Sarah Uriarte Berry, Walter Charles, James Clow, Leslie Denniston, Karen Morrow, Arte Phillips, Lee Roy Reams, Victoria Regan, Craig Rubano & Avery Sommers)
- The Sound of Music (July 10–16). (featuring Emily Loesser as Maria, Robert Westenberg as Captain Georg von Trapp, Jeanne Lehman as The Mother Abbess, Evan Pappas as Max Detweiler, Rachel deBenedet as Baroness Elsa Schrader, Kara Driscoll as Liesl von Trapp, David Ayers as Rolf Gruber, Jake Kohut as Friedrich von Trapp, Kaelan Sullivan as Louisa von Trapp, Patrick Probst as Kurt von Trapp, Erin Dowling as Brigitta von Trapp, Ellen Ransom as Marta von Trapp, Natalie Ann Bram as Gretl von Trapp, John Contini as Franz, Laura Ackermann as Frau Schmidt, Joneal Joplin as Admiral von Scheriber, Tom Murray as Herr Zeller, Karin Berutti as Sister Sophia, Monica Dickhens as Sister Berthe & Lynn Humphrey as Sister Margaretta)
- White Christmas ^{WP} ^{2000b} (July 17–23). (featuring Lara Teeter as Bob Wallace, Lee Roy Reams as Phil Davis, Karen Mason as Betty Haynes, Lauren Kennedy as Judy Haynes, Howard Keel as General Henry Waverly, Karen Morrow as Martha, Rich Pisarkiewicz as Ralph Sheldrake & Natalie A. Hall as Susan)
- A Funny Thing Happened on the Way to the Forum (July 24–30). (featuring Michael McGrath as Prologus / Pseudolus, Bruce Adler as Hysterium, Gary Holcombe as Senex, Robert Westenberg as Lycus, Michael Halling as Hero, Angela Brinton as Philia, Gina Ferrall as Domina, Nat Chandler as Miles Gloriosus, John Freimann as Erronius & Bill Brassea, Damien Brett and Jason Robinson as The Proteans)
- Seven Brides for Seven Brothers (July 31 – August 6). (featuring James Clow as Adam Pontipee, Judy McLane as Milly, Jim T. Ruttman as Benjamin Pontipee, Erich James Polley as Caleb Pontipee, John B. Williford as Daniel Pontipee, Russell Nickerson as Ephraim Pontipee, Eduardo Flores as Frank Pontipee, Britt Freund as Gideon Pontipee, Neal Frederiksen as Mr. Bixby & Monica Dickhens as Mrs. Bixby)
- Singin' in the Rain (August 7–13). (featuring Lara Teeter as Don Lockwood, Randy Rogel as Cosmo Brown, Christina Saffran Ashford as Kathy Seldon, Nancy Ringham as Lina Lamont, Gary Holcombe as R. F. Simpson, Evan Pappas as Roscoe Dexter, Jake Kohut as Young Don Lockwood, Patrick Probst as Young Cosmo Brown, Sharon Ann Farrell as Zelda Zanders, Laura Ackermann as Dora Bailey, Jane Pisarkiewicz as Phoebe Dinsmore, John Contini as Rod Phillips, Gary Glasgow as Diction Coach, Tyler Maynard as Sound Engineer, Tom O'Brien as "Beautiful Girl" Tenor, Laurie Gamache as Female Tango Dancer / The Woman & Kevin Worley as Male Tango Dancer)

^2000a Revue written by executive producer Paul Blake compiling the many works of composer Richard Rodgers.
^2000b World Premiere of the stage adaptation of Irving Berlin's classic film, directed and produced by Paul Blake.

=== 2001 (Season 83) ===
- Brigadoon (June 18–24). (featuring James Clow as Tommy Albright, Judy McLane as Fiona MacLaren, Anthony Cummings as Jeff Douglas, Victoria Clark as Meg Brockie, Eric Bourman as Harry Beaton, John Clonts as Charlie Dalrymple, Joneal Joplin as Mr. Lundie, Louise Hickey-Cadiff as Jean MacLaren, Amy Sullivan as Maggie Anderson, James Anthony as Andrew MacLaren, Gary Glasgow as Angus MacGuffie, Rich Pisarkiewicz as Archie Beaton, Kari Ely as Jane Ashton, John Contini as Stuart Dalrymple, Ken Ross as Frank & Michael Kaer Miller as Sandy Dean)
- Miss Saigon ^{MP} (June 25 – July 1). (featuring Joan Almedilla as Kim, Kevin Gray as The Engineer, Eric Kunze as Chris, Raymond Patterson as John, Edmund A. Nalzaro as Thuy, Anastasia Barzee as Ellen, Sean Bittick & Jaede Carney as Tam & Sala Iwamatsu as Gigi)
- Roman Holiday ^{WP} ^{2001a} (July 9–15). (featuring Jeff McCarthy as Joe Bradley, Catherine Brunell as Princess Ann, Jim Walton as Irving Radovitch, Priscilla Lopez as Francesca Cervelli, Karen Morrow as The Countess, John Freimann as Mr. Hennessy, Stellie Siteman as Social Secretary, James Anthony as The Prime Minister)
- The Wizard of Oz (July 16–22). (featuring Kate Manning as Dorothy Gale, Ozzie Smith as Professor Marvel / The Wizard of Oz, Kevin Ramsey as Hunk / The Scarecrow, Ian Knauer as Hickory / The Tin Man, Bruce Adler as Zeke / The Cowardly Lion, Toni DiBuono as Miss Gulch / The Wicked Witch of the West, Victoria Mallory as Glinda, Laura Ackermann as Aunt Em & Joneal Joplin as Uncle Henry / Guardian of the Gates)
- An Evening of Gershwin ^{R} ^{2001b} (July 23–29). (featuring James Clow, Harvey Evans, Mike Greensill, Pamela Isaacs, Telly Leung, Karen Morrow, Paige Price, Jim Walton & Wesla Whitfield)
- My Fair Lady (July 30 – August 5). (featuring Robert Westenberg as Henry Higgins, Kim Crosby as Eliza Doolittle, Bruce Adler as Alfred P. Doolittle, Ken Page as Colonel Pickering, Rosemary Murphy as Mrs. Higgins, Peter Flynn as Freddy Eynsford-Hill, Laura Ackermann as Mrs. Pearce, John Contini as Zolton Karparthy, Jane Pisarkiewicz as Mrs. Eynsford Hill / Mrs. Hopkins, Rich Pisarkiewicz as Lord Boxington / Jamie & Erik Nelson as Harry)
- Evita (August 6–12). (featuring Judy McLane as Eva Perón, Daniel Cooney as Che, Raymond Jamarillo McLeod as Juan Perón, Scott Hayward as Agustín Magaldi & Kate Manning as Perón's Mistress)

^2001a World Premiere of the stage adaptation of the film, directed and produced by Paul Blake.
^2001b Revue written by executive producer Paul Blake compiling the many works of songwriters George and Ira Gershwin.

=== 2002 (Season 84) ===
- A Chorus Line ^{2002a} (June 17–23). (featuring Blane Savage as Zach, Jane Lanier as Cassie, Alec Timmerman as Larry, Matt Loehr as Mike, Susann Fletcher as Sheila, Jamie Karen as Bebe, Claci Miller as Maggie, Andrew Asnes as Al, Valerie Jane Smith as Kristine, Cindy Marchionda as Diana, Kendra Kassebaum as Val, Jon Peterson as Paul, Kim Smarsh as Connie, John Salvatore as Bobby, Jim T. Ruttman as Don, Ryan Patrick Binder as Mark, Tara Radcliffe as Judy, Benjamin Sterling Cannon as Richie & Russell Garrett as Greg)
- Hooray for Hollywood ^{R} ^{2002b} (June 24–30). (featuring Nat Chandler, Mike Greensill, Pamela Isaacs, Telly Leung, Karen Morrow, Kevin Ramsey, Lee Roy Reams, Amiee Turner & Wesla Whitfield)
- How to Succeed in Business Without Really Trying (July 8–14). (featuring Michael McGrath as J. Pierrepont Finch, Claci Miller as Rosemary Pillkington, Bruce Adler as J.B. Biggley, Karen Morrow as Smitty, Stacey Logan as Hedy La Rue, Scott Schafer as Bud Frump, Joneal Joplin as Bert Bratt, Zoe Vonder Haar as Miss Jones, Gary Holcombe as Mr. Twimble, John Freimann as Wally Womper, James Anthony as Milt Gatch & Sharon Ann Farrell as Miss Krumholtz)
- Peter Pan ^{R} ^{2002c} (July 15–21). (featuring Valerie Wright as Peter Pan, Lee Roy Reams as Mr. Darling / Captain Hook, Rachel Hardin as Wendy Darling / Jane, Laura Ackermann as Mrs. Darling / Wendy (Grown-Up), Rich Pisarkiewicz as Mr. Smee, Eddie Szewczyk as John Darling, Christian Probst as Michael Darling, Jennifer Cody as Tiger Lily, Gretchen Bieber as Liza, Drew Sobey as Nana, Jonathon Saia as The Crocodile, Elliot Burton as Tootles, Joey Dudding as Slightly, Ben Hosler as Curley, Brandon Bieber as Nibs, Patrick Probst as 1st Twin & Stefan Rich as 2nd Twin)
- The Fantasticks ^{MP} (July 22–28). (featuring Burke Moses as El Gallo, Christine Long as Luisa, Barrett Foa as Matt, Bruce Adler as Hucklebee, Ken Page as Bellomy, Gary Holcombe as Henry, John Freimann as Mortimer & Telly Leung as The Mute)
- Camelot (July 29 – August 4). (featuring Mark Jacoby as King Arthur, Kim Crosby as Guinevere, Nat Chandler as Lancelot, Matthew Greer as Mordred, John Sloman as King Pellinore, Joneal Joplin as Merlyn, Ray Fournie as Dinadan, Karin Berutti as Nimue & Stefan Rich as Tom of Warwick)
- Joseph and the Amazing Technicolor Dreamcoat (August 5–11). (featuring Eric Kunze as Joseph, Judy McLane as The Narrator, Anthony Cummings as The Pharaoh & James Anthony as Jacob / Potiphar)
^2002a Production with original direction and choreography recreated by Mitzi Hamilton.

^2002b Revue written by executive producer Paul Blake compiling songs from numerous films.

^2002c Production directed by Thommie Walsh and choreographed by Liza Gennaro.

=== 2003 (Season 85) ===
- Fiddler on the Roof (June 16–22). (featuring Bruce Adler as Tevye, Susan Cella as Golde, Mimi Bensinger as Yente, John Preece as Lazar Wolf, Juliana Stefanov as Tzeitel, Andréa Burns as Hodel, Sara Schmidt as Chava, Daniel Reichard as Motel, Marsh Hanson as Perchik, Brad Drummer as Fyedka, Ellen Ransom as Shprintze, Olivia Threlkeld as Bielke, Rich Pisarkiewicz as Mordcha, Joneal Joplin as Rabbi, Michael Lowe as Mendel, Damien Brett as Avram, Neal Frederiksen as Nachum, Jane Pisarkiewicz as Grandma Tzeitel / Shandel, Jesse Bernath as Fruma-Sarah, John Contini as Constable & Connor Gallagher as The Fiddler)
- Side by Side by Sondheim ^{MP} (June 23–29). (featuring Ashley Brown, Lewis Cleale, Leslie Denniston, Joel Higgins, Michael McGrath, Karen Morrow, Brynn O'Malley, Matthew Scott, Barbara Walsh & Betsy Wolfe)
- Show Boat (July 7–13). (featuring Andréa Burns as Magnolia Hawks, Lewis Cleale as Gaylord Ravenal, Debbie de Coudreaux as Julie La Verne, Gary Holcombe as Cap'n Andy Hawks, Karen Morrow as Parthy Ann Hawks, Michel Bell as Joe, Jo Ann Hawkins White as Queenie, Tari Kelly as Ellie May Shipley, Eddie Korbich as Frank Schultz, James Anthony as Steve Baker, Berklea Going as Kim, Laura Schutter as Young Kim, Tom Murray as Pete / Jim, John Freimann as Windy, Joneal Joplin as Vallon / Radio Announcer, Gary Glasgow as Jake / Jeb / Drunk, Kari Ely as Dottie / Mother Superior / First Lady in Ticket Line & Laura Ackermann as Lottie)
- Cinderella (July 14–20). (featuring Kate Manning as Cinderella, Danny Gurwin as Prince Christopher, Barbara Marineau as The Fairy Godmother, Ruth Williamson as The Stepmother, Joneal Joplin as King Maximilian, Joan Marshall as Queen Constantina, Lisa Howard as Joy, Toni DiBuono as Portia, Robert Earl Gleason as The Herald, Matthew Scott as The Steward, Colin Donnell as Footman, Blake Ginther as Chef / Footman, Mary Carmen Catoya as Dream Cinderella & Carlos Guerra as Dream Prince Christopher)
- Godspell (July 21–27). (featuring David Burnham as Jesus, Clifton Oliver as Judas Iscariot / John the Baptist, Robert Bartley, Hunter Bell, Terri Dixon, Tobi Foster, Montego Glover, Gina Milo, Tommar Wilson & Kirsten Wyatt)
- Crazy for You (July 28 – August 3). (featuring Noah Racey as Bobby Child, Paige Price as Polly Baker, Bruce Adler as Bela Zangler, Nancy Kathryn Anderson as Irene Roth, Anthony Cummings as Lank Hawkins, John Freimann as Everett Baker, Sally Eaton as Mother (Lottie Child), James Anthony as Eugene Fodor, Kari Ely as Patricia Fodor, Sharon Ann Farrell as Tess, Damien Brett as Perkins / Pete / Wyatt, Connor Gallagher as Custus / Roof Specialty, Jerry Gallagher as Moose & Aaron J. Albano as Sam)
- South Pacific (August 4–10). (featuring Lauren Kennedy as Ensign Nellie Forbush, Charles Pistone as Emile de Becque, Wesla Whitfield as Bloody Mary, Danny Gurwin as Lt. Joseph Cable, Michael McGrath as Luther Billis, Aileen Payumo as Liat, Joneal Joplin as Capt. George Brackett, Gary Holcombe as Cdr. William Harbison, John Contini as Lt. Buzz Adams, Rich Pisarkiewicz as Stewpot, David Foley, Jr. as Professor, Alexis Boldin as Ngana & Kasey Parks as Jerome)

=== 2004 (Season 86) ===
- Meet Me in St. Louis (June 21–30). (featuring Kate Manning as Esther Smith, Berklea Going as Tootie Smith, David Burtka as John Truitt, Walter Charles as Mr. Alonzo Smith, Leslie Denniston as Mrs. Anna Smith, John Freimann as Grandpa Prophater, Georgia Engel as Katie, Ashley Brown as Rose Smith, Daniel Reichard as Lon Smith, Ellen Ransom as Agnes Smith & Betsy Wolfe as Lucille Ballard)
- Cats (July 5–11). (featuring Judy McLane as Grizabella, Ken Page as Old Deuteronomy, Jim Newman as Munkustrap, Michael Brian Dunn as Bustopher Jones / Asparagus / Growltiger, David Hibbard as Rum Tum Tugger, Patrick Mullaney as Mr. Mistoffelees, Sally Ann Swarm as Jennyanydots, Matthew Kirk as Skimbleshanks, Julie Tolivar as Bombalurina, Gayle Holsman as Demeter, Brian Collier as Mungojerrie, Mahri Relin as Rumpleteazer, Kyle McDaniel as Plato / Macavity / Rumpus Cat, Shylo Smith as Victoria, Tina Moya as Cassandra, Lauren Masiello as Sillabub, Jean Arbeiter as Jellylorum, Connor Gallagher as Tumblebrutus & Adam Walters as Alonzo)
- Annie (July 12–18). (featuring Natalie Ann Bram as Annie, Walter Charles as Oliver "Daddy" Warbucks, Ruth Williamson as Miss Hannigan, Donna English as Grace Farrell, Ian Knauer as Rooster Hannigan, Susann Fletcher as Lily St. Regis, Molly Ryan as Molly, Keely St. Peters as Pepper, Jacqueline Probst as Kate, Julia Sinks as Duffy, Anita Shastri as July, Paige Moskop as Tessie, Keldon LaVar Price as Star to Be & Anthony Cummings as FDR)
- Breakfast at Tiffany's ^{WP} (the world premiere of the stage adaptation of the film, directed and produced by Paul Blake) (July 19–25). (featuring Lauren Kennedy as Holly Golightly, Alan Campbell as Chip, Ken Page as Joe Howard, Bruce Adler as O.J. Berman, Emily Skinner as Mag Wildwood, Joneal Joplin as Doc Golightly, Anthony Cummings as Rusty Trawler, Julio Agustin as José, Ashley Brown as Phoebe & Colin Donnell as Police Detective)
- The Music Man (July 26 – August 1). (featuring Dirk Lumbard as Harold Hill, Kim Crosby as Marian Paroo, Annie McGreevey as Mrs. Paroo, Evan Pappas as Marcellus Washburn, James Anthony as Mayor Shinn, Ruth Williamson as Eulalie MacKecknie Shinn, Jimmy McEvoy as Winthrop Paroo, Brian Letendre as Tommy Djilas, Jacqui Polk as Zanetta Shinn, Alexandra Petrullo as Amarylis, Anthony Cummings as Charlie Cowell, Rick Knight as Ewart Dunlop, Neal Frederiksen as Oliver Hix, Jim Henry as Olin Britt, Kipp Buckner as Jacey Squires, Kate Manning as Ethel Toffelmier, Laura Ackermann as Alma Hix & Libby Schueddig as Gracie Shinn)
- Guys and Dolls (August 2–8). (featuring Jeff McCarthy as Sky Masterson, Catherine Brunell as Sarah Brown, Bruce Adler as Nathan Detroit, Stacey Logan as Miss Adelaide, Wayne Pretlow as Nicely-Nicely Johnson, John Sloman as Benny Southstreet, Joneal Joplin as Arvide Abernathy, Jerry Gallagher as Big Jule, Stellie Siteman as General Matilda Cartwright, John Contini as Harry the Horse & Wayne Salomon as Lt. Brannigan)
- 42nd Street (August 9–15). (featuring Mark Jacoby as Julian Marsh, Beth Leavel as Dorothy Brock, Cara Cooper as Peggy Sawyer, Leo Ash Evans as Billy Lawlor, Susann Fletcher as Maggie Jones, Joel Blum as Andy Lee, Amy Dolan as Anytime Annie, James Anthony as Pat Denning, John Freimann as Abner Dillon, John Contini as Mac, Gia Grazia Valenti as Phyllis, Tobi Foster as Lorraine & Gary Glasgow as Oscar)

=== 2005 (Season 87) ===
- Beauty and the Beast ^{MP} (June 20–29). (featuring Sarah Litzsinger as Belle, James Clow as The Beast, Nat Chandler as Gaston, Lee Roy Reams as Lumière, Bruce Adler as Cogsworth, Karen Morrow as Mrs. Potts, Ken Page as The Narrator / Maurice, David Hibbard as Lefou, Sharon Ann Farrell as Babette, Katie Pees as Madame de la Grande Bouche & Christian Probst as Chip)
- Annie Get Your Gun (July 4–10). (featuring Liz Larsen as Annie Oakley, Brian d'Arcy James as Frank Butler, Joneal Joplin as Colonel Buffalo Bill Cody, Anthony Cummings as Charlie Davenport, Bruce Adler as Chief Sitting Bull, Pamela Prescott as Dolly Tate, John Freimann as Foster Wilson, James Anthony as Pawnee Bill, Jimmy McEvoy as Little Jake & Molly Ryan as Nellie Oakley)
- Jesus Christ Superstar (July 11–17). (featuring Eric Kunze as Jesus of Nazareth, Michael K. Lee as Judas Iscariot, Andréa Burns as Mary Magdalene, Deven May as Pontius Pilate, Lawson Skala as Caiaphas, Michael Brian Dunn as Annas, Aaron Kaburick as Peter, Daniel Callaway as Simon Zealotes & Ken Page as King Herod)
- Singin' in the Rain (July 18–24). (featuring Jeffry Denman as Don Lockwood, Michael Arnold as Cosmo Brown, Meredith Patterson as Kathy Seldon, Stephanie Youell as Lina Lamont, John Freimann as R. F. Simpson, Frank Vlastnik as Roscoe Dexter, Matt Willis as Young Don Lockwood, Nick Oliveri as Young Cosmo Brown, Caitlin Carter as Zelda Zanders / The Woman / Featured Tango Couple, Kerry Conte as Dora Bailey, Jane Pisarkiewicz as Phoebe Dinsmore, Rich Pisarkiewicz as Rod Phillips, Gary Glasgow as Diction Coach / Policeman, Stacie A. Fusco as Stripper, Robert Earl Gleason as Sound Engineer, Preston Truman Boyd as "Beautiful Girl" Tenor & Stephanie Gibson as Young Woman at Party)
- Mame (July 25–31). (featuring Dee Hoty as Mame Dennis, Beth Leavel as Vera Charles, Georgia Engel as Agnes Gooch, Christian Probst as Young Patrick Dennis, Colin Donnell as Older Patrick Dennis, Jeff McCarthy as Beauregard Jackson Pickett Burnside, Francis Jue as Ito, Joneal Joplin as Dwight Babcock, Anthony Cummings as M. Lindsay Woolsey, Annie McGreevey as Mme. Branislowski / Mother Burnside / Mrs. Upson, Christina Hammersmith as Sally Cato, Cortney Wolfson as Gloria Upson, James Anthony as Leading Man / Mr. Upson, Meggie Cansler as Art Model / Pegeen Ryan & P.J. Palmer as Peter Dennis)
- West Side Story (August 1–7). (featuring Andréa Burns as Maria, Matthew Scott as Tony, Natascia Diaz as Anita, Noah Racey as Riff, Julio Agustin as Bernardo, Raphael Alvarez as Chino, Joneal Joplin as Doc, Tom Murray as Officer Krupke, J. Scott Matthews as Gladhand, Wayne Salomon as Lt. Schrank, David Baum as A-Rab, Kevin Worley as Action, Kurt Kelly as Big Deal, Drew Humphrey as Snowboy & Dominic Roberts as Baby John)
- The Sound of Music (August 8–14). (featuring Kate Baldwin as Maria, Robert Westenberg as Captain Georg von Trapp, Jeanne Lehman as The Mother Abbess, Danny Burstein as Max Detweiler, Leslie Denniston as Baroness Elsa Schrader, Tina Maddigan as Liesl von Trapp, Brian Letendre as Rolf Gruber, Patrick Probst as Friedrich von Trapp, Natalie Ann Bram as Louisa von Trapp, Alex Prakken as Kurt von Trapp, Ariane Rinehart as Brigitta von Trapp, Olivia Threlkeld as Marta von Trapp, Berklea Going as Gretl von Trapp, John Contini as Franz, Laura Ackermann as Frau Schmidt, James Anthony as Admiral von Scheriber, Gary Glasgow as Herr Zeller, Karin Berutti as Sister Sophia, Patricia St. James as Sister Berthe & Lynn Humphrey as Sister Margaretta)

=== 2006 (Season 88) ===
- The King and I (June 19–25). (featuring Leslie Denniston as Anna Leonowens, Francis Jue as The King of Siam, Andréa Burns as Tuptim, Paolo Montalban as Lun Tha, Reveka Mavrovitis as Lady Thiang, Orville Mendoza as The Kralahome, P.J. Palmer as Louis Leonowens, Kasey Parks as Prince Chulalongkorn & James Anthony as Captain Orton / Sir Edward Ramsay)
- Aida ^{MP} (June 26 – July 2). (featuring Lisa Simone as Aida, Will Chase as Radames, Lisa Brescia as Amneris, Jeb Brown as Zoser, Michael James Scott as Mereb, Ken Page as Amonasro & Joneal Joplin as The Pharaoh)
- The Wizard of Oz (July 6–16). (featuring Kate Manning as Dorothy Gale, Ken Page as Professor Marvel / The Wizard of Oz, Dirk Lumbard as Hunk / The Scarecrow, Aaron Kaburick as Hickory / The Tin Man, Bruce Adler as Zeke / The Cowardly Lion, Jan Neuberger as Miss Gulch / The Wicked Witch of the West, Pamela Isaacs as Glinda, Zoe Vonder Haar as Aunt Em & Joneal Joplin as Uncle Henry / Guardian of the Gates)
- Gypsy (July 17–23). (featuring Karen Mason as Rose, Meredith Patterson as Louise, John Sloman as Herbie, Shannon M. O'Bryan as Dainty June, Kevin Worley as Tulsa, Susann Fletcher as Tessie Tura, Patti Mariano as Mazeppa, Blair Ross as Miss Cratchitt / Electra, John Contini as Pop / Cigar, Gary Glasgow as Mr. Goldstone / Weber, Robert Earl Gleason as Uncle Jocko / Bourgeron-Cochon & John Freimann as Phil / Kringelein)
- White Christmas (July 24–30). (featuring Stephen Bogardus as Bob Wallace, Dirk Lumbard as Phil Davis, Sarah Uriarte Berry as Betty Haynes, Shannon M. O'Bryan as Judy Haynes, Joneal Joplin as General Henry Waverly, Wesla Whitfield as Martha, Frank Vlastnik as Ralph Sheldrake & Berklea Going as Susan)
- Oliver! (July 31 – August 6). (featuring Bruce Adler as Fagin, Christian Probst as Oliver Twist, Jenny Powers as Nancy, Ben Crawford as Bill Sikes, Dominic Roberts as The Artful Dodger, Ken Page as Mr. Bumble, Robert Westenberg as Mr. Brownlow, Patti Mariano as Widow Corney, Gary Glasgow as Mr. Sowerberry, Kari Ely as Mrs. Sowerberry & Meggie Cansler as Bet)
- Seven Brides for Seven Brothers (August 7–13). (featuring James Clow as Adam Pontipee, Kate Baldwin as Milly, Jim T. Ruttman as Benjamin Pontipee, Drew Humphrey as Caleb Pontipee, Kevin Worley as Daniel Pontipee, Cary Tedder as Ephraim Pontipee, Colt Prattes as Frank Pontipee, Joseph Medeiros as Gideon Pontipee, Neal Frederiksen as Mr. Bixby & Zoe Vonder Haar as Mrs. Bixby)

=== 2007 (Season 89) ===
- Oklahoma! (June 18–24). (featuring James Clow as Curly, Catherine Brunell as Laurey, Georgia Engel as Aunt Eller, Anthony Cummings as Jud Fry, Leah Hocking as Ado Annie Carnes, Dirk Lumbard as Will Parker, Bruce Adler as Ali Hakim, Joneal Joplin as Andrew "Papa" Carnes, Stephanie Gibson as Gertie Cummings, Rich Pisarkiewicz as Ike Skidmore, Victor J. Wisehart as Dream Curly & Elena Zahlmann as Dream Laurey)
- Grease (June 25 – July 3). (featuring Kevin Kern as Danny Zuko, Shannon M. O'Bryan as Sandy Dumbrowski, Donna Vivino as Betty Rizzo, Dan Amboyer as Kenickie, Kristine Reese as Frenchy, Kristy Cates as Marty, Jaclyn Huberman as Jan, Kasey Marino as Sonny Latierri, Jason Wooten as Doody, Aaron Kaburick as Roger, Barbara Minkus as Miss Lynch, James Anthony as Vince Fontaine, Justin Keyes as Teen Angel & Meggie Cansler as Patty Simcox)
- Hello, Dolly! (July 9–15). (featuring Randy Graff as Dolly Gallagher Levi, Lewis J. Stadlen as Horace Vandergelder, James Clow as Cornelius Hackl, Kate Baldwin as Irene Molloy, Telly Leung as Barnaby Tucker, Jennifer Cody as Minnie Fay, Dana Domenick as Ermengarde, Kendal Sparks as Ambrose Kemper, Ruth Pferdehirt as Ernestina, Rich Pisarkiewicz as Rudolph, Jane Pisarkiewicz as Mrs. Rose & Gary Glasgow as The Judge)
- Peter Pan (July 16–22). (first production featuring a male actor, Francis Jue as Peter Pan with Robert Westenberg as Mr. Darling / Captain Hook, Heidi Dean as Wendy Darling, Kari Ely as Mrs. Darling, James Anthony as Mr. Smee, Christian Probst as John Darling, Spencer Milford as Michael Darling, Shannon M. O'Bryan as Tiger Lily, Jessica Waxman as Liza, Berklea Going as Jane, Jesse Bernath as Nana, Ryan Huber as The Crocodile, Eddie Rowles as Tootles, Ben Hosler as Slightly, PJ Palmer as Curley, Jordan Bollwerk as Nibs, Jimmy McEvoy as 1st Twin & Drew Redington as 2nd Twin)
- The Pajama Game (July 23–29). (featuring Kate Baldwin as Babe Williams, Will Chase as Sid Sorokin, Bruce Adler as Hines, Leslie Denniston as Gladys, Patti Mariano as Mabel, Joe Farrell as Prez, Jennifer Cody as Mae, Jack Friemann as Mr. Hasler, John Contini as Pop, Sara Sheperd as Brenda & Gary Glasgow as The Salesman)
- Joseph and the Amazing Technicolor Dreamcoat (July 30 – August 5). (featuring Eric Kunze as Joseph, Liz Callaway as The Narrator, David Hibbard as The Pharaoh & James Anthony as Jacob / Potiphar)
- Les Misérables ^{MP} (first production at the Muny; world premiere of outdoor production) (August 6–15). (featuring Ivan Rutherford as Jean Valjean, Jeff McCarthy as Javert, Lisa Simone as Fantine, Ken Page as Thénardier, Lisa Howard as Madame Thénardier, Kevin Kern as Marius, Diana Kaarina as Éponine, Leah Horowitz as Cosette, Manu Narayan as Enjolras, Jimmy McEvoy as Gavroche & Olivia Jane Prosser as Young Cosette)

=== 2008 (Season 90) ===
- The Producers ^{MP} (June 16–22). (featuring Lewis J. Stadlen as Max Bialystock; Don Stephenson as Leo Bloom, Angie Schworer as Ulla, Lee Roy Reams as Roger De Bris, Anthony Cummings as Franz Liebkind & Larry Raben as Carmen Ghia)
- High School Musical (June 23 – July 2). (featuring Colin Donnell as Troy Bolton, Andrea Goss as Gabriella Montez, Gretchen Bieber as Sharpay Evans, Brandon Bieber as Ryan Evans, Christopher Spaulding as Chad Danforth, Tallia Brinson as Taylor McKessie, Megan McGinnis as Kelsi Nielson, Justin Keyes as Zeke Baylor, Angeline Holmes as Martha Cox, Ann Harada as Miss Darbus & Stephen Bogardus as Coach Bolton)
- My Fair Lady (July 7–13). (featuring Robert Westenberg as Henry Higgins, Catherine Brunell as Eliza Doolittle, Anthony Cummings as Alfred P. Doolittle, Joneal Joplin as Colonel Pickering, Zoe Vonder Haar as Mrs. Higgins, Daniel Reichard as Freddy Eynsford-Hill, Laura Ackermann as Mrs. Pearce, James Anthony as Zoltan Karpathy / Harry, Michele Burdette-Elmore as Mrs. Eynsford Hill / Mrs. Hopkins & Rich Pisarkiewicz as Jamie)
- 90 Years of Muny Magic ^{R} (A Musical Revue Celebrating of All the Great music of The Last 90 Seasons) (July 14–20). (featuring Christian Probst as The Narrator, Michel Bell, James Clow, Kim Crosby, Erin Davie, Leslie Denniston, Francis Jue, Peter Lockyer, Dirk Lumbard, Ken Page, Meredith Patterson, Lee Roy Reams, Graham Rowat & Betsy Wolfe)
- Miss Saigon (July 21–27). (featuring Ma-Anne Dionisio as Kim, Francis Jue as The Engineer, Eric Kunze as Chris, Josh Tower as John, Michael K. Lee as Thuy, Kathy Voytko as Ellen, Sam Poon as Tam & Joanne Javien as Gigi)
- My One and Only (July 28 – August 3). (featuring Dirk Lumbard as Captain Billy Buck Chandler, Meredith Patterson as Edythe Herbert, Eugene Fleming as Mr. Magix, Ken Page as Rt. Rev. J.D. Montgomery, Jeff McCarthy as Prince Nicolai, Julyana Soelistyo as Mickey, Peggy Quinn as The Reporter, Joneal Joplin as Chorus Line (Penn Station) & Robert Earl Gleason as Achmed)
- Fiddler on the Roof (August 4–10). (featuring Lewis J. Stadlen as Tevye, Leslie Denniston as Golde, Barbara Minkus as Yente, James Anthony as Lazar Wolf, Jennifer Lorae as Tzeitel, Kate Manning as Hodel, Jacqui Polk as Chava, Robb Sapp as Motel, Colin Donnell as Perchik, Mike McGowan as Fyedka, Berklea Going as Shprintze, Tara Willey as Bielke, Rich Pisarkiewicz as Mordcha, John Freimann as Rabbi, Etai BenShlomo as Mendel, Tracy Baker as Avram, Neal Frederiksen as Nachum, Zoe Vonder Haar as Grandma Tzeitel / Shandel, Lora Lee Gayer and Alex Puette as Fruma-Sarah, John Contini as Constable, Jane Pisarkiewicz as Bluma (solo gossip singer), Laura Ackermann as Mirala (solo gossip singer) & Ian Joseph as The Fiddler)

=== 2009 (Season 91) ===
- 42nd Street (June 15–21). (featuring Robert Cuccioli as Julian Marsh, Dee Hoty as Dorothy Brock, Shannon M. O'Bryan as Peggy Sawyer, Todd Lattimore as Billy Lawlor, Patti Mariano as Maggie Jones, Bill Buell as Bert Berry, Matt Loehr as Andy Lee, Nikki Snelson as Anytime Annie, James Anthony as Pat Denning, John Freimann as Abner Dillon, John Contini as Mac, Melissa Zaremba as Phyllis, Kelly Sheehan as Lorraine & Bryan Langlitz as Oscar)
- Annie (June 22–30). (featuring Abigail Isom as Annie, John Schuck as Oliver "Daddy" Warbucks, Beth Leavel as Miss Hannigan, Christianne Tisdale as Grace Farrell, Jim Newman as Rooster Hannigan, Stacey Logan as Lily St. Regis, Kelsey Knee as Molly, Stephanie Patton as Pepper, Abigail Friedmann as Kate, Sarah Koo as Duffy, Julia Schweizer as July, Gabby Glore as Tessie, Gabrielle McClinton as Star to Be & Joneal Joplin as FDR)
- Meet Me in St. Louis (July 6–12). (featuring Brynn O'Malley as Esther Smith, Elizabeth Teeter as Tootie Smith, Max von Essen as John Truitt, Stephen Bogardus as Mr. Alonzo Smith, Leslie Denniston as Mrs. Anna Smith, Lewis J. Stadlen as Grandpa Prophater, Zoe Vonder Haar as Katie, Catherine Walker as Rose Smith, Robb Sapp as Lon Smith, Berklea Going as Agnes Smith & Lora Lee Gayer as Lucille Ballard)
- Godspell (July 13–19). (featuring Eric Kunze as Jesus, Demond Green as Judas Iscariot / John the Baptist, Uzo Aduba, Adam Kantor, Chelsea Krombach, Tracy McDowell, Orville Mendoza, Ruth Pferdihirt, Rashida Scott & Chris Spaulding)
- The Music Man (July 20–26). (featuring James Clow as Harold Hill, Kate Baldwin as Marian Paroo, Georgia Engel as Mrs. Paroo, Jeb Brown as Marcellus Washburn, James Anthony as Mayor Shinn, Donna English as Eulalie MacKecknie Shinn, Parker Donovan as Winthrop Paroo, Drew Humphrey as Tommy Djilas, Nicole Hren as Zanetta Shinn, Olivia Prosser as Amarylis, Anthony Cummings as Charlie Cowell, Rich Knight as Ewart Dunlop, Eric Dalbey as Oliver Hix, Chris Hallam as Olin Britt, Tim Waurick as Jacey Squires, Lora Lee Gayer as Ethel Toffelmier, Laura Ackermann as Alma Hix & Alyssa Wolf as Gracie Shinn)
- Camelot (July 27 – August 2). (featuring Jeff McCarthy as King Arthur, Jenny Powers as Guinevere, Lewis Cleale as Lancelot, Allen E. Read as Mordred, Fred Applegate as King Pellinore, Joneal Joplin as Merlyn, Raymond Fournie as Dinadan, Justin Scott Brown as Dap & Christian Probst as Tom of Warwick)
- Hairspray ^{MP} (August 3–9). (featuring Joline Mujica as Tracy Turnblad, Paul Vogt as Edna Turnblad, Lara Teeter as Wilbur Turnblad, Meggie Cansler as Penny Pingleton, Constantine Rousouli as Link Larkin, Christian White as Seaweed J. Stubbs, Charlotte Crossley as Motormouth Maybelle, Ashley Spencer as Amber Von Tussle, Susann Fletcher as Velma Von Tussle, Kasey Marino as Corny Collins, Delaney Haynes as Little Inez, Jenn Perry as Prudy Pingleton / Gym Teacher / Matron & James Anthony as Harriman F. Spritzer / Principal / Mr. Pinky)

== 2010s ==
=== 2010 (Season 92) ===
- Beauty and the Beast (June 21–30). (featuring Sarah Darling as Belle, James Clow as The Beast, Nicholas Rodriguez as Gaston, Lara Teeter as Lumière, Jeb Brown as Cogsworth, Leslie Denniston as Mrs. Potts, Ken Page as Maurice, Robb Sapp as Lefou, Meg Gillentine as Babette, Gaelen Gilliland as Madame de la Grand Bouche & Abigail Friedman as Chip)
- Titanic ^{MP} (July 5–11). (featuring Tom Hewitt as Thomas Andrews, Joneal Joplin as Captain E.J. Smith, Ben Crawford as Frederick Barrett, Telly Leung as Harold Bride, Henry Stram as Henry Etches, Christian Probst as Bellboy, William Youmans as J. Bruce Ismay, Drae Page as Jack Thayer, Derek Carley as Charles Clarke, Meggie Cansler as Caroline Neville, Rich Pisarkiewicz as Edgar Beane, Michele Ragusa as Alice Beane, Jessica Grové as Kate McGowen, Justin Scott Brown as Jim Farrell, Ron Raines as Isidor Straus / 3rd Class Passenger, Claudia Catania as Ida Straus / 3rd Class Passenger, Raymond Fournie as J.J. Astor / 3rd Class Passenger / Stevedore, Robert Earl Gleason as Benjamin Guggenheim / 3rd Class Passenger, Neal Frederiksen as John B. Thayer / 3rd Class Passenger, John Meurer as George Widener / Frank Carlson / 3rd Class Passenger, Michele Burdette-Elmore as Charlotte Cardoza / 3rd Class Passenger, Gary Glasgow as 3rd Officer Herbert J. Pitman / The Major / 3rd Class Passenger & Nick Cosgrove as Frederick Fleet)
- Damn Yankees (July 12–18). (featuring Lewis J. Stadlen as Mr. Applegate, Angie Schworer as Lola, Eric Kunze as Joe Hardy, Linda Mugleston as Meg Boyd, Leslie Kritzer as Gloria Thorpe, Walter Charles as Joe Boyd, Lee Roy Reams as Van Buren, James Anthony as Welch, Zoe Vonder Haar as Sister, John Freimann as Stadium Announcer, Alex Sanchez as Rocky, Francis Jue as Smokey, Aaron Kaburick as Sohovik & Lee Anne Mathews as Doris)
- Cats (July 19–25). (featuring Stephanie J. Block as Grizabella, Ken Page as Old Deuteronomy, Lara Teeter as Munkustrap, Michael Brian Dunn as Bustopher Jones / Asparagus / Growltiger, Kevin Loreque as Rum Tum Tugger, Joseph Medeiros as Mr. Mistoffelees, Christine Negherbon as Jennyanydots, Drew Humphrey as Skimbleshanks, Julie Tolivar as Bombalurina, Lisa Karlin as Demeter, Ryan Breslin as Mungojerrie, Lauren Masiello as Rumpleteazer, AJ Hughes as Plato / Macavity / Rumpus Cat, Sarah Marchetti as Victoria, Kiira Schmidt as Cassandra, Laura Irion as Sillabub, Heather Mieko as Jellylorum, Alex DeLeo as Tumblebrutus & Joey Dudding as Pounceable / Alonzo)
- The Sound of Music (July 26 – August 1). (featuring Ashley Brown as Maria, Tom Hewitt as Captain Georg von Trapp, Linda Mugleston as The Mother Abbess, Lewis J. Stadlen as Max Detweiler, Leslie Denniston as Baroness Elsa Schrader, Jessica Grové as Liesl von Trapp, Justin Scott Brown as Rolf Gruber, Christian Probst as Freidrich von Trapp, Berklea Going as Louisa von Trapp, Matthew Howard as Kurt von Trapp, Julia Schweizer as Brigitta von Trapp, Elizabeth Teeter as Marta von Trapp, Maria Knasel as Gretl von Trapp, John Contini as Franz, Laura Ackermann as Frau Schmidt, James Anthony as Admiral von Scheriber, Rich Pisarkiewicz as Herr Zeller, Madeline Trumble as Sister Sophia, Jane Pisarkewicz as Sister Berthe & Lynn Humphrey as Sister Margaretta)
- Footloose ^{MP} (August 2–8). (featuring Curtis Holbrook as Ren McCormack, Meggie Cansler as Ariel Moore, Jeff McCarthy as Rev. Shaw Moore, Dee Hoty as Vi Moore, Kevin Massey as Willard Hewitt, Cathryn Basile as Rusty, Ben Crawford as Chuck Cranston, Jennifer Prescott as Ethel McCormack, Lee Ann Mathews as Lulu Warnicker, Anthony Cummings as Wes Warnicker, Karin Berutti as Eleanore Dunbar, Robert Earl Gleason as Coach Dunbar & Gary Glasgow as Principal Clark)
- Show Boat (August 9–15). (featuring Leah Horowitz as Magnolia Hawks, Danny Gurwin as Gaylord Ravenal, Terry Burrell as Julie La Verne, Gary Beach as Cap'n Andy Hawks, Georgia Engel as Parthy Ann Hawks, Michel Bell as Joe, Jo Ann Hawkins White as Queenie, Beverly Ward as Ellie May Shipley, Kirby Ward as Frank Schultz, James Anthony as Steve Baker, Kelsey Knee as Kim, Shannon M. O'Bryan as Young Kim, Rich Pisarkiewicz as Pete / Charlie, Nick Cosgrove as Windy, Anthony Cummings as Vallon, John Riddle as Jeb / Drunk / Radio Announcer, Michele Burdette-Elmore as Mother Superior, Michael Horsely as Jake, Samantha Massell as Lottie & Gia Grazie Valenti as Dottie)

=== 2011 (Season 93) ===
- Legally Blonde ^{MP} (June 20–26). (featuring Lauren Zakrin as Elle Woods, D. B. Bonds as Emmett Forrest, Lisa Howard as Paulette, Ken Land as Professor Callahan, Matthew Hydzik as Warner Huntington III, Sara Sheperd as Vivienne Kensington, Nikki Snelson as Brooke Wyndham, Taylor Louderman as Margot, Tiffany Engen as Serena, K. B. Hart as Pilar, Michelle Rombola as Kate / Chutney, Lili Froehlich as District Attorney, Madeline Trumble as Enid, Stephanie Cain as Stenographer, Brené Jackson as Store Manager / Judge, Julie Probst as Mom, Colt Prattes as Grandmaster Chad /Dewey / Kyle, Robert Earl Gleason as Dad / Winthrop / Reporter, Charles Osborne as Pforzheimer, Sam Lips as Lowell/Carlos, Matthew Steffens as Padamadan/Nikos & John Riddle as Aaron)
- Kiss Me, Kate (June 27 – July 3). (featuring Tom Hewitt as Fred Graham / Petruchio, Lisa Vroman as Lilli Vanessi / Katherine, Andrea Chamberlain as Lois Lane / Bianca, Curtis Holbrook as Bill Calhoun / Lucentio, John Schuck as First Man, Lee Roy Reams as Second Man, Joneal Joplin as Harry Trevor / Baptista, James Anthony as Harrison Howell, Max Kumangai as Paul, Zoe Vonder Haar as Hattie, Eric Santagata as Gremio, Andy Jones as Hortensio, Kenny Metzger as Ralph, Rich Pisarkiewicz as John, Patrick Ross as Cab Driver & Patrick Ross as Haberdasher)
- The Little Mermaid ^{MP}^{2011a} (July 6–14) (nine nights). (featuring Patti Murin as Ariel, Paul Vogt as Ursula, John Riddle as Prince Eric, Francis Jue as Sebastian, Ken Page as King Triton, Lara Teeter as Scuttle, Elizabeth Teeter as Flounder, Gary Glasgow as Grimsby, Lee Roy Reams as Chef Louis, Matt Braver as Flotsam, Max Kumangai as Jetsam, Madeline Trumble as Carlotta & Sam Lips as Pilot)
- Singin' in the Rain (July 18–24). (featuring Tony Yazbeck as Don Lockwood, Curtis Holbrook as Cosmo Brown, Shannon M. O'Bryan as Kathy Seldon, Michele Ragusa as Lina Lamont, James Anthony as R. F. Simpson, John Freimann as Roscoe Dexter, Matthew Howard as Young Don Lockwood, Rexford C. Calkins as Young Cosmo Brown, Chelsea Wilson as Stripper, Amy Blackman as Dora Bailey, Kelly Sheehan as Zelda Zanders, Rich Pisarkiewicz as Rod Phillips, Julian Decker as Policeman, Laura Ackermann as Phoebe Dinsmore, John Contini as Diction Coach, Cara Salerno as Olga Mara, Graydon Long as Sound Engineer, Patrick Ross as "Beautiful Girl" Tenor & Kelly O'Neill as Woman at Post Premiere Party)
- Little Shop of Horrors (July 25–31). (featuring Rob McClure as Seymour Krelborn, Alli Mauzey as Audrey, Raye Birk as Mr. Mushnik, Clarke Thorell as Orin Scrivello DDS / Bernstein / Mrs. Luce / Snip / Others, Ken Page as Audrey II (Voice), Jen Brissman as Ronnette, Alysha Deslorieux as Crystal, Brené Jackson as Chiffon & Michael Latini as Audrey II (Puppeteer))
- Seven Brides for Seven Brothers (August 1–7). (featuring James Clow as Adam Pontipee, Jenny Powers as Milly, Colt Prattes as Benjamin Pontipee, Cameron Hobbs as Celeb Pontipee, Eric Santagata as Daniel Pontipee, Drew Humphrey as Ephraim Pontipee, Sam Lips as Frank Pontipee, Andy Jones as Gideon Pontipee, Neal Frederiksen as Mr. Bixby, Michelle Rombola as Mrs. Bixby, Gary Glasgow as The Preacher & John Contini as Mr. Perkins)
- Bye Bye Birdie (August 8–14). (featuring Lara Teeter as Albert Peterson, Andréa Burns as Rose Alvarez, Parker Pogue as Conrad Birdie, Susan Cella as Mae Peterson, Kelly O'Neill as Kim MacAfee, Lewis J. Stadlen as Mr. Harry MacAfee, Leslie Denniston as Mrs. Doris MacAfee, Samantha Massell as Ursula Merkle, Michael Harp as Randolph MacAfee, Julian Decker as Hugo Peabody, Kelly Sheehan as Gloria Rasputin, Alysha Deslorieux as Alice, James Anthony as The Mayor, Candice M. Coleman as The Mayor's Wife, Jane Pisarkiewicz as Mrs. Merkle & Rich Pisarkiewicz as Charles F. Maude)

^2011aInstead of the usual Monday-Sunday run, The Little Mermaid ran from Wednesday through Thursday of the following week.

=== 2012 (Season 94) ===
- Thoroughly Modern Millie^{MP} (June 18–24). (featuring Tari Kelly as Millie Dillmount, Andrew Samonsky as Jimmy Smith, Beth Leavel as Mrs. Meers, Leslie Uggams as Muzzie Van Hossmere, Stephen R. Buntrock as Mr. Trevor Graydon, Megan McGinnis as Miss Dorothy Brown, Francis Jue as Ching Ho, Darren Lee as Bun Foo & Tory Ross as Miss Flannery)
- Chicago^{MP}^{2012a} (June 25 – July 1). (featuring Patti Murin as Roxie Hart, Natascia Diaz as Velma Kelly, Justin Guarini as Billy Flynn, Dean Christopher as Amos Hart, Jackie Hoffman as Matron "Mama" Morton & Patti Cohenour as Mary Sunshine)
- Aladdin^{MP}^{2012b} (July 5–13) (nine nights). (featuring Robin de Jesús as Aladdin, Samantha Massell as Princess Jasmine, John Tartaglia as The Genie, Thom Sesma as Jafar, Curtis Holbrook as Iago, Ken Page as the Sultan, Eddie Korbich as Babkak, Jason Graae as Omar & Francis Jue as Kassim)
- Dreamgirls^{MP} (July 16–22). (featuring Jennifer Holliday as Effie Melody White, Demetria McKinney as Deena Jones, Christopher Jackson as Curtis Taylor Jr., Milton Craig Nealy as James "Thunder" Early, Jenelle Lynn Randall as Lorrell Robinson, Tommar Wilson as C. C. White, Ken Page as Marty Madison & Karla Mosely as Michelle Morris)
- Joseph and the Amazing Technicolor Dreamcoat (July 23–29). (featuring Justin Guarini as Joseph, Mamie Parris as The Narrator, Austin Miller as The Pharaoh & Gary Glasgow as Jacob / Potiphar)
- Pirates! (or, Gilbert & Sullivan Plunder'd)^{MP}^{2012c} (July 30 – August 5). (featuring Hunter Foster as The Pirate King, Ed Dixon as Major-General Stanley, Jay Armstrong Johnson is Frederic, Analisa Leaming is Mabel, Kathy Fitzgerald as Ruth, Alan Mingo Jr. as The Sergeant, Jon Rua as Samuel, Emily Trumble as Isabel, Katie Johannigman as Edith, Tory Ross as Kate, Cassie Levine as Jane, Alexandra Ferrara as Pippa & Audrey McHale as Cornelia)
- The King and I (August 6–12). (featuring Laura Michelle Kelly as Anna Leonowens, Kevin Gray as The King of Siam, Stephanie Park as Tuptim, Joshua Dela Cruz as Lun Tha, Joan Almedilla as Lady Thiang, Alan Ariano as The Kralahome, Matt Johnson as Louis Leonowens, Nick Boivin as Prince Chulalongkorn & Michael James Reed as Captain Orton / Sir Edward Ramsay)

^2012aWhen Chicago was presented in 1977, it was the Broadway production which had just closed in New York. This production was billed as the "Muny production premiere."
^2012bInstead of the normal Monday-Sunday run, Aladdin ran from Thursday through Friday of the following week. This was only the third production of the stage version of Aladdin anywhere in the world.
^2012cA version of Gilbert and Sullivan's The Pirates of Penzance.

=== 2013 (Season 95) ===
- Monty Python's Spamalot^{MP} (June 17–23). (featuring John O'Hurley as King Arthur, Michele Ragusa as The Lady of the Lake, Chris Hoch as Sir Lancelot / The French Taunter / Knight of Ni / Tim the Enchanter, John Scherer as Sir Robin / Guard 1 / Brother Maynard, David Hibbard as Patsy / Guard 2, Ben Davis as Sir Dennis Galahad / The Black Knight / Prince Herbert’s Father, Tally Sessions as Dennis’ Mother / Sir Bedevere / Mayor / Concorde, Kevin Cahoon as Historian / Not Dead Fred / French Guard / Minstrel / Prince Herbert & Bob Costas as The Voice of God)
- Shrek the Musical^{MP} (June 24–30). (featuring Stephen Wallem as Shrek, Michael James Scott as Donkey, Julia Murney as Princess Fiona, Rob McClure as Lord Farquaad, Anthony Christian Daniel as Pinocchio, Natalie Venetia Belcon as Dragon, Maria Knasel as Young Fiona & Allison Broadhurst as Teen Fiona)
- Nunsense Muny Style!^{MP} (July 1–7). (featuring Dee Hoty as Reverend Mother Mary Regina, Phyllis Smith as Sister Julia, Child of God, Tari Kelly as Sister Mary Amnesia, Beth Leavel as Sister Robert Anne, Sarah Meahl as Sister Mary Leo, Terri White as Sister Mary Hubert, Ken Page as Sister Mary Wilhelm, Lara Teeter as Father Virgil, Rachel Abrams as Sister Mary Luke & Michele Burdette Elmore as Sister Mary Brendan)
- South Pacific (July 8–14). (featuring Laura Michelle Kelly as Ensign Nellie Forbush, Ben Davis as Emile de Becque, Loretta Ables Sayre as Bloody Mary, Josh Young as Lt. Joseph Cable, Tally Sessions as Luther Billis, Sumie Maeda as Liat, James Anthony as Capt. George Brackett, Michael James Reed as Cdr. William Harbison, Greg Roderick as Lt. Buzz Adams, Ryan Andes as Stewpot, Scott Anthony Joy as Professor, Caitlin Chau as Ngana & Spencer Jones as Jerome)
- Les Misérables (July 15–21). (featuring Hugh Panaro as Jean Valjean, Norm Lewis as Javert, Charlotte Maltby as Fantine, Michael McCormick as Monsieur Thénardier, Tiffany Green as Madame Thénardier, Alex Prakken as Marius, Lindsey Mader as Éponine, Katie Travis as Cosette, Bobby Conte Thornton as Enjolras, Jimmy Coogan as Gavroche & Lilly Kanterman as Young Cosette)
- Mary Poppins^{MP}^{2013a} (July 25 – August 2) (nine nights). (featuring Jenny Powers as Mary Poppins, Rob McClure as Bert, Stephen R. Buntrock as George Banks, Erin Dilly as Winifred Banks, Elizabeth Teeter as Jane Banks, Aidan Gemme as Michael Banks, James Anthony as Admiral Boom / Bank Chairman, Zoe Vonder Haar as Mrs. Brill, Anthony Christian Daniel as Robertson Ay, Laura Ackermann as The Bird Woman & Rebecca Finnegan as Katie Nana / Queen Victoria / Miss Smythe / Mrs. Corry / Miss Andrew)
- West Side Story (August 5–11). (featuring Ali Ewoldt as Maria, Kyle Dean Massey as Tony, Natalie Cortez as Anita, Curtis Holbrook as Riff, Manuel Herrera as Bernardo, Jon Rua as Chino, Ken Page as Doc, Rich Pisarkiewicz as Officer Krupke, Gary Glasgow as Gladhand, Michael James Reed as Lt. Schrank, Sam Rogers as A-Rab, Drew Foster as Action, Travis Waldschmidt as Big Deal, Kyle Coffman as Snowboy & Brandon Hudson as Baby John)

^2013aInstead of the usual Monday-Sunday run, Mary Poppins ran from Thursday to Friday of the following week.

=== 2014 (Season 96) ===
- Billy Elliot the Musical^{MP} (June 16–22). (featuring Tade Biesinger as Billy Elliot, Emily Skinner as Mrs. Wilkinson, Daniel Oreskes as Dad, Patti Perkins as Grandma, Ben Nordstrom as Tony, Michael Harp as Michael, Maria Knasel as Debbie, Paul Aguirre as Mr. Braithwaite, Steve Isom as George, Molly Garner as Mum & Maximilien A. Baud as Older Billy)
- Tarzan^{MP} (June 25 – July 2)^{2014a}. (featuring Nicholas Rodriguez as Tarzan, Kate Rockwell as Jane Porter, Quentin Earl Darrington as Kerchak, Katie Thompson as Kala, Gregory Haney as Terk, Ken Page as Professor Porter, Michael James Reed as Clayton, Spencer Jones as Young Tarzan & Nathaniel Mahone as Young Terk.
- Porgy and Bess (July 7–13). (featuring Nathaniel Stampley as Porgy, Alicia Hall Moran as Bess, Kingsley Leggs as Sportin' Life, Alvin Crawford as Crown, Denisha Ballew as Serena, David Hughey as Jake, Sumayya Ali as Clara & Danielle Lee Greaves as Mariah)
- The Addams Family^{MP} (July 14–20). (featuring Rob McClure as Gomez Addams, Jenny Powers as Morticia Addams, Steve Rosen as Uncle Fester, Sara Kapner as Wednesday Addams, John Scherer as Mal Beineke, Hollis Resnik as Alice Beineke, Dan DeLuca as Lucas Beineke, Jennifer Cody as Grandma Addams, Michael Harp as Pugsley Addams & William Ryall as Lurch)
- Seussical^{MP} (July 22–28)^{2014b}. (featuring John Tartaglia as The Cat in the Hat, Stephen Wallem as Horton the Elephant, Reuben Thomas as Jojo, Kirsten Wyatt as Gertrude McFuzz, Julia Murney as Mayzie LaBird, Liz Mikel as Sour Kangaroo, James Anthony as General Genghis Kahn Schmitz, Gary Glasgow as The Mayor of Whoville, April Strelinger as Mrs. Mayor & Raymond J. Lee, Blakely Slaybaugh and Omari Tau as The Wickersham Brothers)
- Grease (July 31 – August 8)^{2014c}. (featuring Brandon Espinoza as Danny Zuko, Taylor Louderman as Sandy Dumbrowski, Arianda Fernandez as Betty Rizzo, Drew Foster as Kenickie, Madison Johnson as Frenchy, Natalie Kaye Clater as Marty, Amelia Jo Parish as Jan, L'ogan J'ones as Sonny Latierri, Tyler Bradley Indyck as Doody, Larry Owens as Roger, Phyllis Smith as Miss Lynch, Matthew Saldivar as Vince Fontaine, Teressa Kindle as Teen Angel & Rhiannon Hansen as Patty Simcox)
- Hello, Dolly! (August 11–17). (featuring Beth Leavel as Dolly Gallagher Levi, John O'Hurley as Horace Vandergelder, Rob McClure as Cornelius Hackl, Mamie Parris as Irene Molloy, Jay Armstrong Johnson as Barnaby Tucker, Eloise Kropp as Minnie Fay, Berklea Going as Ermengarde, Daniel Berryman as Ambrose Kemper, April Strelinger as Ernestina & Rich Pisarkiewicz as Rudolph / The Judge)

^2014aEight nights, Wednesday through Wednesday.
^2014bTuesday through Monday.
^2014cNine nights, Thursday through Friday.

=== 2015 (Season 97) ===
- My Fair Lady (June 15–21). (featuring Anthony Andrews as Henry Higgins, Alexandra Silber as Eliza Doolittle, Michael McCormick as Alfred P. Doolittle, Paxton Whitehead as Colonel Pickering, Zoe Vonder Haar as Mrs. Higgins, Matthew Scott as Freddy Eynsford-Hill, Peggy Billo as Mrs. Pearce, Anna Blair as Mrs. Eynsford Hill, Steve Isom as Jamie, Rich Pisarkiewicz as Harry, Lori Barrett-Pagano as Mrs. Hopkins)
- Hairspray (June 23–30). (featuring Ryann Redmond as Tracy Turnblad, Bryan Batt as Edna Turnblad, Lara Teeter as Wilbur Turnblad, Charlotte Maltby as Penny Pingleton, John Battagliese as Link Larkin, Gerald Caesar as Seaweed J. Stubbs, Liz Mikel as Motormouth Maybelle, Taylor Louderman as Amber Von Tussle, Heather Ayers as Velma Von Tussle, Christopher Hanke as Corny Collins, Kennedy Holmes as Little Inez, Jenn Harris as Prudy Pingleton / Gym Teacher / Matron & Bob Amaral as Harriman F. Spritzer / Principal / Mr. Pinky)
- Holiday Inn^{MP} (July 6–12). (featuring Colin Donnell as Jim Hardy, Noah Racey as Ted Hanover, Patti Murin as Linda Mason, Holly Ann Butler as Lila Dixon, Nancy Opel as Louise Badger, Danny Rutigliano as Danny Reed & Phoenix Lawson as Charlie Winslow)
- Buddy: The Buddy Holly Story^{MP} (July 13–19). (featuring Andy Christopher as Buddy Holly, Nicholas Rodriguez as Ritchie Valens, John Scherer as Hipockets Duncan, Jo Lynn Burks as Vi Petty, Joe Cosmo Cogen as Jerry Allison, Christopher Ryan Grant as The Big Bopper, Ben Nordstrom as Clearlake MC, Michael James Reed as Norman Petty, Sharone Sayegh as María Elena & Sam Weber as Joe B. Mauldin)
- Into the Woods^{MP} (July 21–27). (featuring Heather Headley as The Witch, Erin Dilly as The Baker's Wife, Rob McClure as The Baker, Ken Page as The Narrator, Andrew Samonsky as The Wolf / Cinderella's Prince, Elena Shaddow as Cinderella, Sara Kapner as Little Red Riding Hood, Jason Gotay as Jack, Zoe Vonder Haar as Jack’s Mother, Michael McCormick as Cinderella's Father / The Mysterious Man, Samantha Massell as Rapunzel, Ryan Silverman as Rapunzel's Prince, Ellen Harvey as Cinderella’s Stepmother, Anna Blair as Cinderella's Mother / Grandma, Gary Glasgow as The Steward, April Strelinger as Lucinda, Jennifer Diamond as Florinda & Maggie Lakis as Milky White)
- Beauty and the Beast (July 29 – August 7). (featuring Kate Rockwell as Belle, Nicholas Rodriguez as The Beast, Nathaniel Hackmann as Gaston, Rob McClure as Lumière, Steve Rosen as Cogsworth, Marva Hicks as Mrs. Potts, Lenny Wolpe as Maurice, Michael Hartung as Lefou, Deidre Goodwin as Babette, Heather Jane Rolff as Madame de la Grand Bouche & Spencer Jones as Chip)
- Oklahoma! (August 10–16). (featuring Ben Davis as Curly, Christine Cornish Smith as Laurey, Beth Leavel as Aunt Eller, Alexander Gemignani as Jud Fry, Jenni Barber as Ado Annie Carnes, Clyde Alves as Will Parker, Nehal Joshi as Ali Hakim, Shaver Tillitt as Andrew "Papa" Carnes, Audrey Kennedy as Gertie Cummings & Drew Battles as Ike Skidmore)

=== 2016 (Season 98) ===
- The Wizard of Oz (June 13–22). (featuring Danielle Bowen as Dorothy Gale, P. J. Benjamin as Professor Marvel / The Wizard of Oz, Kevin Cahoon as Hunk / The Scarecrow, Nicholas Rodriguez as Hickory / The Tin Man, Stephen Wallem as Zeke / The Cowardly Lion, Peggy Roeder as Miss Gulch / The Wicked Witch of the West, Leah Berry as Glinda & Lynn Humphrey as Aunt Em)
- 42nd Street (June 24–30). (featuring Shuler Hensley as Julian Marsh, Emily Skinner as Dorothy Brock, Jonalyn Saxer as Peggy Sawyer, Jay Armstrong Johnson as Billy Lawlor, Ann Harada as Maggie Jones, Jason Kravits as Bert Berry, Bryan Thomas Hunt as Andy Lee, Megan Sikora as Anytime Annie, Joey Sorge as Pat Denning, Fred Zimmerman as Abner Dillon, Patrick Blindauer as Mac, Darien Crago as Phyllis, Amy Van Norstrand as Lorraine & Rich Pisarkiewicz as Oscar)
- The Music Man (July 5–11). (featuring Hunter Foster as Harold Hill, Elena Shaddow as Marian Paroo, Liz McCartney as Mrs. Paroo, Todd Buonopane as Marcellus Washburn, Mark Linn-Baker as Mayor Shinn, Nancy Anderson as Eulalie MacKecknie Shinn, Owen Hanford as Winthrop Paroo, Colby Dezelick as Tommy Djilas, Halli Toland as Zanetta Shinn, Greta Clark as Amarylis, Michael James Reed as Charlie Cowell, Adam Halpin as Ewart Dunlop, Ben Nordstrom as Oliver Hix, Joseph Torello as Olin Britt, J.D. Daw as Jacey Squires, Elizabeth Ann Berg as Ethel Toffelmier & April Strelinger as Alma Hix)
- Young Frankenstein^{MP} (July 13–19). (featuring Robert Petkoff as Dr. Frederick Frankenstein, Stephanie Gibson as Inga, Steve Rosen as Igor, Vicki Lewis as Frau Blucher, Jennifer Cody as Elizabeth, Timothy Hughes as The Monster & John Scherer as Inspector Kemp / Hermit)
- Mamma Mia!^{MP} (July 21–28). (featuring Julia Murney as Donna Sheridan, Brittany Zeinstra as Sophie Sheridan, Ann Harada as Rosie, Jenny Powers as Tanya, Justin Guarini as Sam Carmichael, Ben Nordstrom as Harry Bright, Mike McGowan as Bill Austin & Jason Gotay as Sky)
- Fiddler on the Roof (July 30 – August 5). (featuring Michael McCormick as Tevye, Anne L. Nathan as Golde, Nancy Opel as Yente / Fruma-Sarah, Peter Van Wagner as Lazar Wolf, Haley Bond as Tzeitel, Briana Carlson-Goodman as Hodel, Carly Blake Sebouhian as Chava, Alan Schmuckler as Motel, Marrick Smith as Perchik, Colby Dezelick as Fyedka, Emma Resek as Shprintze, Elise Edwards as Bielke, Jeremy Vogel as Mordcha, Jeremy Lawrence as Rabbi, Adam J. Levy as Mendel, Gary Glasgow as Avram, Randall Dodge as Nachum, Zoe Vonder Haar as Grandma Tzeitel, Michael James Reed as Constable & Andrew Ross Crowe as The Fiddler)
- Aida (August 8–14). (featuring Michelle Williams as Aida, Zak Resnick as Radames, Taylor Louderman as Amneris, Patrick Cassidy as Zoser, Wonza Johnson as Mereb, Ken Page as Amonasro & Lara Teeter as The Pharaoh)

=== 2017 (Season 99) ===
- Jesus Christ Superstar (June 12–18). (featuring Bryce Ryness as Jesus of Nazareth, Constantine Maroulis as Judas Iscariot, Ciara Renée as Mary Magdalene, Ben Davis as Pontius Pilate, Nicholas Ward as Caiaphas, Mykal Kilgore as Annas, Andrew Chappelle as Peter, Douglas Lyons as Simon Zealotes & Christopher Sieber as King Herod)
- The Little Mermaid (June 20–29). (featuring Emma Degerstedt as Ariel, Emily Skinner as Ursula, Jason Gotay as Prince Eric, James T. Lane as Sebastian, Jerry Dixon as King Triton, Jeffrey Schecter as Scuttle, Spencer Jones as Flounder, Richard B. Watson as Grimsby, Frank Vlastnik as Chef Louis / Pilot, Kevin Zak as Flotsam & Will Porter as Jetsam)
- A Funny Thing Happened on the Way to the Forum (July 5–11). (featuring Jeffrey Schecter as Prologus / Pseudolus, John Tartaglia as Hysterium, Mark Linn-Baker as Senex, Jason Kravits as Lycus, Marrick Smith as Hero, Ali Ewoldt as Philia, E. Faye Butler as Domina, Nathaniel Hackmann as Miles Gloriosus, Whit Reichert as Erronius & Marcus Choi, Justin Keyes and Tommy Scrivens as The Proteans)
- All Shook Up ^{MP} (July 13–19). (featuring Tim Rogan as Chad, Caroline Bowman as Natalie Haller / Ed, Barrett Riggins as Dennis, Lara Teeter as Jim Haller, Liz Mikel as Sylvia, Felicia Finley as Miss Sandra, Hollis Resnik as Mayor Matilda Hyde, Ciara Alyse Harris as Lorraine, Jerry Vogel as Sheriff Earl & Paul Schwensen as Dean Hyde)
- The Unsinkable Molly Brown (July 21–27). (featuring Beth Malone as Molly Tobin, Marc Kudisch as Johnny J. Brown, Whitney Bashor as Julia, Paolo Montalban as Arthur, Justin Guarini as Vincenzo & David Abeles as Erich)
- A Chorus Line (July 29 – August 4). (featuring Ivan Hernandez as Zach, Bianca Marroquín as Cassie, John T. Wolfe as Larry, Sean Harrison Jones as Mike, Holly Ann Butler as Sheila, Caley Crawford as Bebe, Bronwyn Tarboton as Maggie, Rick Faugno as Al, Madison Johnson as Kristine, Hannah Florence as Diana, Mackenzie Bell as Val, Ian Paget as Paul, Jolina Javier as Connie, Evan Kinnane as Bobby, Justin Prescott as Don, Drew Redington as Mark, Kiira Schmidt as Judy, Sharrod Williams as Richie & Victor Wisehart as Greg)
- Newsies ^{MP} (August 7–13). (featuring Jay Armstrong Johnson as Jack Kelly, Davis Gaines as Joseph Pulitzer, Tessa Grady as Katherine Plumber, Ta'Rea Campbell as Medda Larkin, Daniel Quadrino as Crutchie, Spencer Davis Milford as Davey Jacobs & Gabriel Cytron as Les Jacobs)

=== 2018 (Season 100) ===
- May 18, 2018. "An Evening With the Stars"

This one-night-only production had a cast of 100, with special performances by Chita Rivera and Tommy Tune, along with Broadway and Muny stars Patrick Cassidy, Ken Page, Jenny Powers, Lara Teeter and Graham Rowat. Co-Hosted by Heather Headley and Matthew Morrison, "An Evening with the Stars" was created for this birthday, celebrating the history of musical theatre at The Muny over the previous century.

The Regular Season

- Jerome Robbins' Broadway ^{MP} (June 11–17). (featuring Rob McClure as The Setter from Overture / Emcee from On the Town / Pa from High Button Shoes / Tevye from Fiddler on the Roof / Floy from High Button Shoes, Jenny Powers as Hildy from On the Town / Monotony Singer from Miss Liberty, Garen Scribner as Gaby from On the Town / Tony from West Side Story / Monotony Clarinet, Tanairi Vazquez as Anita from West Side Story, Sarah Marie Jenkins as Peter Pan from Peter Pan / Grandma Tzeitel from Fiddler on the Roof, Maggie Lakis as Ma from High Button Shoes / Golde from Fiddler on the Roof, Drew Redington as Chip from On the Town, Davis Wayne as Riff from West Side Story, Sarah Bowden as Claire from On the Town / Tuptim from The King and I / Fruma-Sarah from Fiddler on the Roof / Mama Crook from High Button Shoes, Leeds Hill as Ozzie from On the Town, Erica Wong as Eliza from The King and I, Elizabeth Teeter as Wendy Darling from Peter Pan, Sean Rozanski as Bernardo from West Side Story/ Monotony Soloist Trombone, Peter Chursin as King Simon from The King and I, Alexa De Barr as Maria from West Side Story / Monotony Soloist, Cole Joyce as John Darling from Peter Pan, Gabriel Cytron as Michael Darling from Peter Pan, Jess Fry as Angel / George from The King and I, Kyle Coffman as A-Rab from West Side Story / The Fiddler from Fiddler on the Roof, Evan Kinnane as Motel from Fiddler on the Roof, Hillary Porter as Rosalia from West Side Story / Tzeitel from Fiddler on the Roof, Bethany Tesarck as Ivy Smith from On the Town, Victor Wisehart as Lazar Wolf from Fiddler on the Roof & Jennifer Ferry as Somewhere Soloist from West Side Story)
- The Wiz (June 19–25). (featuring Danyel Fulton as Dorothy Gale, Nathan Lee Graham as The Wiz, Jared Grimes as The Scarecrow, James T. Lane as The Tinman, Darius de Haas as The Lion, Demetria McKinney as Aunt Em / Glinda, E. Faye Butler as Addaperle / Evillene, Sir Brock Warren as Gatekeeper / Monkey Leader & Nathaniel J. Washington as Head Winkie)
- Singin' in the Rain (June 27 – July 3). (featuring Corbin Bleu as Don Lockwood, Jeffrey Schecter as Cosmo Brown, Berklea Going as Kathy Seldon, Megan Sikora as Lina Lamont, Jeff McCarthy as R. F. Simpson, George Merrick as Roscoe Dexter, Ryan Washington as Young Don Lockwood, Ben Iken as Young Cosmo Brown, Lizz Picini as Stripper / Girl in the Green Dress, Debby Lennon as Dora Bailey / Phoebe Dinsmore, Halle Morse as Zelda Zanders, Patrick Blindauer as Rod Phillips, Cayel Tregeagle as Policeman, Gary Glasgow as Diction Coach, Emma Gassett as Olga Mara, Evan Kinnane as Sound Engineer, Ward Billeisen as "Beautiful Girl" Tenor & Kaitlin Nelson as Woman at Post Premiere Party)
- Jersey Boys ^{MP} (July 9–16). (featuring Mark Ballas as Frankie Valli, Nicolas Dromard as Tommy DeVito, Bobby Conte Thornton as Bob Gaudio, Keith Hines as Nick Massi, Neal Benari as Gyp DeCarlo, Nicholas Rodriguez as Bob Crewe, Michelle Aravena as Mary Delgado, Tommy Martinez as Joe Pesci, Ben Nordstrom as Nick DeVito / Norm Waxman, Candi Boyd as Frankie’s Mother / Miss Frankie Nolan / Lorraine & Carissa Massaro as Angel / Francine)
- Annie (July 18–25). (featuring Peyton Ella as Annie, Christopher Sieber as Oliver “Daddy’” Warbucks, Jennifer Simard as Miss Hannigan, Britney Coleman as Grace Farrell, Jon Rua as Rooster Hannigan, Holly Ann Butler as Lily St. Regis, Ana McAlister as Molly, Samantha Iken as Pepper, Ella Grace Roberts as Kate, Trenay LaBelle as Duffy, Amanda Willingham as July, Madeline Domian as Tessie, Abigail Isom as Star to Be & John Scherer as FDR)
- Gypsy (July 27 – August 2). (featuring Beth Leavel as Rose, Julia Knitel as Louise, Adam Heller as Herbie, Hayley Podschun as Dainty June, Drew Redington as Tulsa, Jennifer Cody as Miss Cratchitt / Tessie Tura, Ellen Harvey as Mazeppa, Ann Harada as Electra, Kip Niven as Pop / Cigar / Detroit Announcer, Michael James Reed as Weber / Bougeron-Cochon / Detroit Announcer / Mr. Goldstone / Philadelphia Announcer & Lara Teeter as Uncle Jocko / Phil Minsky’s Announcer)
- Meet Me in St. Louis (August 4–12). (featuring Emily Walton as Esther Smith, Elena Adams as Tootie Smith, Dan DeLuca as John Truitt, Stephen R. Buntrock as Mr. Alonzo Smith, Erin Dilly as Mrs. Anna Smith, Ken Page as Grandpa Prophater, Kathy Fitzgerald as Katie, Liana Hunt as Rose Smith, Jonathan Burke as Lon Smith, Elle Wesley as Agnes Smith & Madison Johnson as Lucille Ballard)

=== 2019 (Season 101) ===
- Guys and Dolls (June 10–16). (featuring Ben Davis as Sky Masterson, Brittany Bradford as Sarah Brown, Jordan Gelber as Nathan Detroit, Kendra Kassebaum as Miss Adelaide, Orville Mendoza as Nicely-Nicely Johnson, Jared Gertner as Benny Southstreet, Ken Page as Arvide Abernathy, Brendan Averett as Big Jule, Zoe Vonder Haar as General Matilda Cartwright, Kevin Cahoon as Harry the Horse & Rich Pisarkiewicz as Lt. Brannigan)
- Kinky Boots ^{MP} (June 19–25). (featuring Graham Scott Fleming as Charlie Price, J. Harrison Ghee as Lola, Taylor Louderman as Lauren, Caroline Bowman as Nicola, Paul Whitty as Don, John Scherer as George, Holly Davis as Pat, Jenn Perry as Trish, Ross Lekites as Harry, Patrick Oliver Jones as Mr. Price, Omega Jones as Simon Sr., Anthony Sagaria as Richard Bailey, Victor Landon as Young Charlie & Khaydn M. Adams as Young Lola)
- 1776 (June 27 – July 3). (featuring Robert Petkoff as John Adams, Adam Heller as Benjamin Franklin, Keith Hines as Thomas Jefferson, Ben Davis as John Dickinson, Ryan Andes as Richard Henry Lee, Bobby Conte Thornton as Edward Rutledge, Jenny Powers as Abigail Adams, Ali Ewoldt as Martha Jefferson, Joneal Joplin as Stephen Hopkins, Michael James Reed as John Hancock, Greg Roderick as Roger Sherman, Harry Bouvy as Andrew McNair, J.D. Daw as Robert Livingston, Patrick Blindauer as Samuel Chase, George Abud as James Wilson, Michael Thomas Holmes as George Read, Philip Hoffman as Caesar Rodney, Gary Glasgow as Charles Thomson, Larry Mabrey as Lewis Morris, Jerry Vogel as John Witherspoon, Brian Keane as Thomas McKean, Reed Armstrong as Lyman Hall, Ben Nordstrom as Josiah Bartlett, Dean Christopher as Joseph Hewes, Benjamin Love as Leather Apron & Alex Prakken as Courier)
- Rodgers and Hammerstein's Cinderella (July 8–16). (featuring Mikaela Bennett as Ella, Jason Gotay as Prince Topher, Ashley Brown as Marie, Alison Fraser as Madame, Stephanie Gibson as Gabrielle, Jennifer Cody as Charlotte, John Scherer as Sebastian, Chad Burris as Jean-Michel & Victor Ryan Robertson as Lord Pinkleton)
- Footloose (July 18–24). (featuring Mason Reeves as Ren McCormack, McKenzie Kurtz as Ariel Moore, Jeremy Kushnier as Rev. Shaw Moore, Heather Ayers as Vi Moore, Eli Mayer as Willard Hewitt, Khailah Johnson as Rusty, Andrew Alstat as Chuck Cranston, Darlesia Cearcy as Ethel McCormack, NaTasha Yvette Williams as Lulu Warnicker, Aaron Kaburick as Wes Warnicker, Rebecca Young as Eleanore Dunbar, Patrick Blindauer as Coach Dunbar, Jerry Vogel as Principal Clark, Maggie Kuntz as Urleen & Katja Rivera Yanko as Wendy Jo)
- Paint Your Wagon (July 27 – August 2). (featuring Matt Bogart as Ben Rumson, Mamie Parris as Cayla Woodling, Omar Lopez-Cepero as Armando, Mark Evans as William, Maya Keleher as Jennifer Rumson, Allan K. Washington as Wesley, Andrew Kober as Jake, Austin Ku as Ming-Li, Raymond J. Lee as Guang-Li, Rodney Hicks as H. Ford & Michael James Reed as Craig Woodling)
- Matilda the Musical ^{MP} (August 5–11). (featuring Mattea Conforti as Matilda Wormwood, Beth Malone as Miss Agatha Trunchbull, Laura Michelle Kelly as Miss Jennifer Honey, Josh Grisetti as Mr. Wormwood, Ann Harada as Mrs. Wormwood, Darlesia Cearcy as Mrs. Phelps, Trevor Michael Schmidt as Michael Wormwood, Sean Ewing as Rodolpho, Colby Dezelick as The Escapologist, Gabi Stapula as The Acrobat, Ryan Fitzgerald as Sergei, Ella Grace Roberts as Lavender, Owen Hanford as Bruce, Ana McAlister as Amanda, Trenay LaBelle as Hortensia, Victor Landon as Nigel, Elliott Campbell as Eric, Ava Castro as Alice & Spencer Donovan Jones as Tommy)

== 2020s ==
2020 (Season 102) Cancelled due to COVID-19.

It was scheduled to feature Chicago • (June 15–21); Mary Poppins • (June 24 – July 2); Sweeney Todd: The Demon Barber of Fleet Street • (July 6–12); Smokey Joe's Cafe • (July 14–20); The Sound of Music • (July 23–29); On Your Feet! • (August 1–7); Seven Brides for Seven Brothers • (August 10–16)

=== 2021 (Season 103) ===
- Smokey Joe's Cafe ^{MP} (July 26 – August 1). (featuring Charl Brown, Michael Campayno, Mykal Kilgore, Tiffany Mann, Hayley Podschun, Dee Roscioli, Christopher Sams, Nasia Thomas & Jason Veasey)
- The Sound of Music (August 3–8). (featuring Kate Rockwell as Maria, Michael Hayden as Captain Georg von Trapp, Bryonha Marie Parham as The Mother Abbess, John Scherer as Max Detweiler, Jenny Powers as Baroness Elsa Schrader, Elizabeth Teeter as Liesl von Trapp, Andrew Alstat as Rolf Gruber, Victor de Paula Rocha as Freidrich von Trapp, Amelie Lock as Louisa von Trapp, Parker Dzuba as Kurt von Trapp, Jillian Depke as Brigitta von Trapp, Abby Hogan as Marta von Trapp, Kate Scarlett Kappel as Gretl von Trapp, David Hess as Franz, April Strelinger as Frau Schmidt, Jerry Vogel as Admiral von Scheriber, Michael James Reed as Herr Zeller, Beth Kirkpatrick as Sister Sophia, Andrea Jones-Sojola as Sister Berthe & Leah Berry as Sister Margaretta)
- Seven Brides for Seven Brothers (August 12–18). (featuring Edward Watts as Adam Pontipee, Kendra Kassebaum as Milly, Harris Milgrim as Benjamin Pontipee, Waldemar Quinones-Villanueva as Celeb Pontipee, Ryan Steele as Daniel Pontipee, Garett Hawe as Ephraim Pontipee, Kyle Coffman as Frank Pontipee, Brandon L. Whitmore as Gideon Pontipee, Rebecca Young as Mrs. Bixby & Rich Pisarkiewicz as The Preacher)
- On Your Feet! ^{MP} (August 21–27). (featuring Arianna Rosario as Gloria Estefan, Omar Lopez-Cepero as Emilio Estefan, Natascia Diaz as Gloria Fajardo, Alma Cuervo as Consuelo García, Lee Zarrett as Phil, Isabella Iannelli as Little Gloria & Jordan Vergara as Nayib / Young Emilio / Jeremy)
- Chicago (August 30 – September 2. (featuring Sarah Bowden as Roxie Hart, J. Harrison Ghee as Velma Kelly, James T. Lane as Billy Flynn, Adam Heller as Amos Hart, Emily Skinner as Matron "Mama" Morton & Ali Ewoldt as Mary Sunshine)

=== 2022 (Season 104) ===
- Chicago (June 13–19). (featuring Sarah Bowden as Roxie Hart, J. Harrison Ghee as Velma Kelly, James T. Lane as Billy Flynn, Adam Heller as Amos Hart, Emily Skinner as Matron "Mama" Morton & Ali Ewoldt as Mary Sunshine)
- Camelot (June 22–28). (featuring Robert Petkoff as King Arthur, Shereen Pimentel as Guinevere, Brandon Chu as Lancelot, Barrett Riggins as Mordred, Evan Ruggiero as Sir Dinadan, Daryl Tofa as Sir Lionel, Sarah Quinn Taylor as Sir Sagramore & Riley Carter Adams as Tom of Warwick)
- Mary Poppins (July 5–13). (featuring Jeanna de Waal as Mary Poppins, Corbin Bleu as Bert, Nehal Joshi as George Banks, Erin Davie as Winifred Banks, Laila Fantroy as Jane Banks, Gabe Cytron as Michael Banks, Whit Reichert as Admiral Boom / Bank Chairman, Zoe Vonder Haar as Mrs. Brill, Barrett Riggins as Robertson Ay, Alesia Cearcy as The Bird Woman, Debby Lennon as Queen Victoria / Miss Andrew & Jade Jones as Katie Nana / Miss Smythe / Mrs. Corry)
- Sweeney Todd: The Demon Barber of Fleet Street ^{MP} (July 16–22). (featuring Ben Davis as Sweeney Todd, Carmen Cusack as Mrs. Lovett, Robert Cuccioli as Judge Turpin, Lincoln Clauss as Tobias Ragg, Jake Boyd as Anthony Hope, Riley Noland as Johanna, Julie Hanson as The Beggar Woman, Stephen Wallem as Beadle Bamford, Harnando Umana as Adolfo Pirelli & Price Waldman as Jonas Fogg)
- Legally Blonde (July 25–31). (featuring Kyla Stone as Elle Woods, Fergie L. Philippe as Emmett Forrest, Patti Murin as Paulette, Sean Allan Krill as Professor Callahan, Dan Tracy as Warner Huntington III, Olivia Kaufmann as Vivienne Kensington, Hayley Podschun as Brooke Wyndham, Kelsey Anne Brown as Margot, Gabi Campo as Serena, Khailah Johnson as Pilar & Kerri George as Enid)
- The Color Purple ^{MP} (August 3–9). (featuring Anastacia McCleskey as Celie, Tracee Beazer as Shug Avery, Nicole Michelle Haskins as Sofia, Gilbert Domally as Harpo, Evan Tyrone Martin as Mister & Nasia Thomas as Nettie)
- Joseph and the Amazing Technicolor Dreamcoat (August 12–18). (featuring Jason Gotay as Joseph, Jessica Vosk as The Narrator, Mykal Kilgore as The Pharaoh & Eric Jordan Young as Jacob / Potiphar)

=== 2023 (Season 105) ===
- Beautiful: The Carole King Musical ^{MP} (June 12–18). (featuring Sara Sheperd as Carole King, Jackie Burns as Cynthia Weil, Jarrod Spector as Barry Mann, Steven Good as Gerry Goffin, Noah Weisberg as Don Kirshner & Sharon Hunter as Genie Klein)
- Beauty and the Beast (June 22–30). (featuring Ashley Blanchet as Belle, Ben Crawford as The Beast, Claybourne Elder as Gaston, Kelvin Moon Loh as Lumière, Eric Jordan Young as Cogsworth, Ann Harada as Mrs. Potts, Harrison White as Maurice, Tommy Bracco as Lefou, Holly Ann Butler as Babette, Debby Lennon as Madame de la Grand Bouche & Michael Hobin as Chip)
- Chess ^{MP} (July 5–11). (featuring Jessica Vosk as Florence Vassy, John Riddle as Anatoly Sergievsky, Jarrod Spector as Frederick Trumper, Rodney Hicks as Walter de Courcey, Tally Sessions as Alexander Molokov, Phillip Johnson Richarson as The Arbiter & Taylor Louderman as Svetlana Sergievsky)
- West Side Story (July 15–21). (featuring Kanisha Feliciano as Maria, Christian Douglas as Tony, Jerusha Cavazos as Anita, Kyle Coffman as Riff, Yurel Echezarreta as Bernardo, Cedric Leiba Jr. as Chino, Ken Page as Doc, James A. Butz as Office Krupke, Drew Battles as Gladhand & Micheal James Reed as Lt. Schrank, Daniel Assetta as A-Rab, Ethan David Zeph as Action, Tanner Ray Wilson as Big Deal, RJ Higton as Snowboy & Ethan Van Slyke as Baby John)
- Little Shop of Horrors (July 25–31). (featuring Robin de Jesús as Seymour Krelborn, Patti Murin as Audrey, Michael McGrath as Mr. Mushnik, Ryan Vasquez as Orin Scrivello DDS / Bernstein / Mrs. Luce / Snip / Others, Nicholas Ward as Audrey II (Voice), Taylor Marie Daniel as Chiffon, Stephanie Gomérez as Ronnette & Kennedy Holmes as Crystal)
- Rent ^{MP} (August 4–10). (featuring Lincoln Clauss as Mark Cohen, Vincent Kempski as Roger Davis, Ashley De La Rosa as Mimi Marquez, Evan Tyrone Martin as Tom Collins, Adrian Villegas as Angel Schunard, Lindsay Pearce as Maureen Johnson, Anastacia McCleskey as Joanne Jefferson & Tré Frazier as Benjamin Coffin III)
- Sister Act^{MP} (August 14–20). (featuring Bryonha Marie Parham as Deloris Van Cartier, Mamie Parris as The Mother Superior, James T. Lane as Eddie Souther, Alan H. Green as Curtis Jackson, Thom Sesma as Monsignor O' Hara, Meredith Aleigha Wells as Sister Mary Robert, Madeleine Doherty as Sister Mary Lazarus, Katy Geraghty as Sister Mary Patrick, Brandon Espinoza as Pablo, F. Michael Haynie as Joey & Darron Hayes as TJ)

=== 2024 (Season 106) ===
- Les Misérables (June 17–23). (featuring John Riddle as Jean Valjean, Jordan Donica as Javert, Teal Wicks as Fantine, Red Concepción as Monsieur Thénardier, Jade Jones as Madame Thénardier, Peter Neureuther as Marius, Emily Bautista as Éponine, Gracie Annabelle Parker as Cosette, James D. Gish as Enjolras & Ken Page as The Bishop of Digne)
- Dreamgirls (June 27 – July 3). (featuring Tiffany Mann as Effie Melody White, Aisha Jackson as Deena Jones, Charl Brown as Curtis Taylor Jr., Nick Rashad Burroughs as James "Thunder" Early, Courtnee Carter as Lorrell Robinson, Aramie Payton as C. C. White, Ron Himes as Marty Madison, Natalie Kaye Clater as Michelle Morris & Robby Clater as Wayne)
- The Little Mermaid (July 8–16). (featuring Savy Jackson as Ariel, Nicole Parker as Ursula, Michael Maliakel as Prince Eric, Fergie L. Philippe as Sebastian, Ben Davis as King Triton, Jennifer Cody as Scuttle, Rich Pisarkiewicz as Grimsby, Christopher Sieber as Chef Louis, Kennedy Kanagawa as Flotsam & Adam Fane as Jetsam)
- Fiddler on the Roof (July 19–25). (featuring Adam Heller as Tevye, Jill Abramovitz as Golde, Cheryl Stern as Yente, Jeremy Radin as Lazar Wolf, Samantha Massell as Tzeitel, Hannah Corneau as Hodel, Emerson Glick as Chava, Max Chernin as Motel, Clay Singer as Perchik & Andrew Alstat as Fyedka, Ellie Schwartz as Shprintze, Zoe Klevorn as Bielke, Price Waldman as Mordcha, Bob Ameral as Rabbi, Ben Rosenbach as Mendel, David Perlman as Avram, Jerry Vogel as Nachum, James A. Butz as Constable & Max Chucker as The Fiddler)
- Waitress ^{MP}(July 30 – August 5). (featuring Jessica Vosk as Jenna Hunterson, Devin DeSantis as Dr. Jim Pomatter, Nicole Michelle Haskins as Becky, Lissa deGuzman as Dawn Pinkett, Cleavant Derricks as Joe, Troy Iwata as Ogie Anhorn, Ben Crawford as Earl Hunterson & Jonah D. Winston as Cal)
- In the Heights ^{MP} (August 9–15). (featuring Benji Santiago as Usnavi, Ariana Burks as Nina Rosario, Alex Joseph Grayson as Benny, Alysia Velez as Vanessa, Nancy Ticotin as Abuela Claudia, Miguel Gil as Sonny, Martín Solá as Kevin Rosario, Karmine Alers as Camila Rosario, Darilyn Castillo as Daniela & Marlene Fernandez as Carla)
- Anything Goes (August 19–25). (featuring Jeanna de Waal as Reno Sweeney, Jay Armstrong Johnson as Billy Crocker, Kevin Chamberlin as Moonface Martin, George Abud as Lord Evelyn Oakleigh, Kimberly Immanuel as Hope Harcourt, Adrianna Hicks as Erma, Ann Harada as Mrs. Evangeline Harcourt, Lara Teeter as Elisha J. Whitney, Eric Jordan Young as Captain, Danny Gardner as Ship’s Purser, Spencer Jones as Spit & Joe Capstick as Dippy)

=== 2025 (Season 107) ===
- Bring It On: The Musical ^{MP}(June 16-22). (featuring Jonalyn Saxer as Campbell, Kennedy Holmes as Danielle, Bryce Williams as Randall, Taylor Sage Evans as Eva, Katy Geraghty as Bridget, Ayla Ciccone-Burton as Nautica, Aj Paramo as La Cienega, Katie Riedel as Skylar, Regine Sophia as Kylar, Sean Harrison Jones as Steven, Kevin Trinio as Twig & Brandon O’Neal Bomer as Cameron)
- Come From Away ^{MP}(June 26-July 2). (featuring Heidi Blickenstaff as Beverley Bass, John Bolton as Nick, Ashley Brown as Diane, Andréa Burns as Bonnie, Trey DeLuna as Kevin J., Alan H. Green as Bob, Adam Heller as Claude, Abigail Isom as Janice, Jacob Keith Watson as Oz, Tamika Lawrence as Hannah, Jason Tam as Kevin T., and Zoe Vonder Haar as Beulah)
- Frozen ^{MP}(July 6-14). (featuring Patti Murin as Anna, Hannah Corneau as Elsa, Jelani Remy as Kristoff, Bobby Conte as Hans, Kennedy Kanagawa as Olaf, Andrew A. Cano as Sven, Jared Gertner as Weselton, Isla Turner as Young Anna & Maliah Strawbridge as Young Elsa)
- Evita (July 18-24). (featuring Katerina McCrimmon as Eva Perón, Omar Lopez-Cepero as Che, Paulo Szot as Juan Perón & Daniel Torres as Agustín Magaldi)
- Dear Evan Hansen ^{MP}(July 28-August 3). (featuring Michael Fabisch as Evan Hansen, Jackie Burns as Heidi Hansen, Maggie Lakis as Cynthia Murphy, Rob McClure as Larry Murphy, Afra Sophia Tully as Zoe Murphy, Joshua Bess as Connor Murphy, Bryan Munar as Jared Kleinman, Savy Jackson as Alana Beck)
- La Cage aux Folles (August 8-14). (featuring Norm Lewis as Georges, Michael James Scott as Albin, Troy Iwata as Jacob, Mason Reeves as Jean-Michel, Cameron Anika Hill as Anne, Terence Archie as M. Edouard Dindon, Allison Blackwell as Mme. Marie Dindon, Michael Hartung as Francis & Meghan Murphy as Jacqueline)
- Jersey Boys (August 18-24). (featuring Pablo David Laucerica as Frankie Valli, Ryan Vasquez as Tommy DeVito, Andrew Poston as Bob Gaudio, Cory Jeacoma as Nick Massi, John Leone as Gyp DeCarlo & Shea Coffman as Bob Crewe)

=== 2026 (Season 108) ===
- Hairspray (June 15-21). (featuring Katy Geraghty as Tracy Turnblad, Richard Kind as Edna Turnblad, John Bolton as Wilbur Turnblad, Ashlyn Maddox as Penny Pingleton, Ben Jackson Walker as Link Larkin, Nicholas A. Wilkinson as Seaweed J. Stubbs, Charity Angél Dawson as Motormouth Maybelle, Madison Thompson as Amber Von Tussle, Sara Gettelfinger as Velma Von Tussle, Paul Schwensen as Corny Collins, Joy Elizabeth Rhodes as Little Inez, Hannah Solow as Prudy Pingleton / Gym Teacher / Matron & Kevin Zak as Harriman F. Spritzer / Principal / Mr. Pinky)
- Shrek the Musical (June 25-July 1). (featuring Nik Walker as Shrek, Marcus M. Martin as Donkey, Kara Lindsay as Princess Fiona, Troy Iwata as Lord Farquaad, Tyler Joseph Ellis as Pinocchio, Salome Smith as Dragon, Aymee Garcia as Gingy, Lake Schultz as Young Fiona & Amelie Lock as Teen Fiona)
- South Pacific (July 6-12). (featuring Taylor Louderman as Ensign Nellie Forbush, Paulo Szot as Emile de Becque, Joan Almedilla as Bloody Mary, Michael Canu as Lt. Joseph Cable, Bobby Conte as Luther Billis, Michaela Marfori as Liat, Michael James Reed as Capt. George Brackett, Jeff Cummings as Cdr. William Harbison, Robert Crenshaw as Stewpot, John El-Jor as Professor, Grace Moore as Ngana & Josiah Paik as Jerome)
- Newsies (July 16-22). (featuring Jack Roden as Jack Kelly, Michael Park as Joseph Pulitzer, Kayla Pecchioni as Katherine Plumber, Anastacia McCleskey as Medda Larkin, Nolan Almeida as Crutchie, Bryce Williams as Davey Jacobs & Jaron Bentley as Les Jacobs)
- Ain't Too Proud ^{MP}(July 27-August 2). (featuring James T. Lane as Otis Williams, Nick Rashad Burroughs as David Ruffin, Elijah Ahmad Lewis as Eddie Kendricks, Jawan Jackson as Melvin Franklin & Daniel Yearwood as Paul Williams)
- Meet Me in St. Louis (August 6-13). (featuring Katerina McCrimmon as Esther Smith, Lilah Levinson as Tootie Smith, Andrew Poston as John Truitt, Colin Donnell as Mr. Alonzo Smith, Patti Murin as Mrs. Anna Smith, Stan Brown as Grandpa Prophater, Beth Leavel as Katie, Kyla Stone as Rose Smith, Ilan Eskenazi as Lon Smith, Joylin Bass as Agnes Smith & Lissa deGuzman as Lucille Ballard)
- Something Rotten! ^{MP}(August 17-23). (featuring Matt Doyle as Nick Bottom, Jacob Dickey as William Shakespeare, Bryonha Marie as Bea, Will Burton as Nigel Bottom, Jennifer Cody as Nostradamus, Elizabeth Teeter as Portia, Lara Teeter as Brother Jeremiah, Adam Heller as Shylock, Gary Glasgow as Lord Clapham / Master of the Justice and DeMarius R. Copes as The Minstrel)

== Sources ==
- The Muny 1993 75th Season Souvenir Program
- Muny archival records
- www.muny.org
