= 42nd Street (musical) =

American musical

- Original Broadway Cast Recording cover
- Music: Harry Warren
- Lyrics: Al Dubin; Johnny Mercer
- Book: Michael Stewart; Mark Bramble
- Basis: 42nd Street by Bradford Ropes; 42nd Street by Rian James, James Seymour, and Whitney Bolton
- Premiere: August 25, 1980; Winter Garden Theatre, New York City
- Productions: 1980 Broadway; 1984 West End; 2001 Broadway revival; 2007 UK tour; 2007 Asia Tour; 2012 UK tour; 2015 US tour; 2017 West End revival; 2023 UK tour
- Awards: Tony Award for Best Musical; Olivier Award for Best Musical; Tony Award for Best Revival of a Musical

42nd Street is a 1980 stage musical with a book by Michael Stewart and Mark Bramble, lyrics by Al Dubin and Johnny Mercer and music by Harry Warren. The 1980 Broadway production won the Tony Awards for Best Musical and Best Choreography and it became a long-running hit. The show was also produced in London in 1984 (winning the Olivier Award for Best Musical) and its 2001 Broadway revival won the Tony Award for Best Revival.

Based on the 1932 novel by Bradford Ropes and the subsequent 1933 Hollywood film adaptation, this backstage musical follows the rehearsal process of a Broadway show staged during the height of the Great Depression.

The show is a jukebox musical of sorts, in that, in addition to songs from the 1933 film 42nd Street, it includes songs that Dubin and Warren wrote for many other films at around the same time, including Gold Diggers of 1933, Roman Scandals, Dames, Gold Diggers of 1935, Go into Your Dance, Gold Diggers of 1937 and The Singing Marine. It also includes "There's a Sunny Side to Every Situation", written by Warren and Johnny Mercer for Hard to Get. A 2017 revival added the song "Boulevard of Broken Dreams", written by Warren and Dubin for Moulin Rouge.

== Background ==
Producer David Merrick "took a huge gamble with his $3 million production based on the 1933 Warner Brothers film musical", as "only one other show had made the transfer from original movie musical to the stage — Gigi, a flop in 1974." He felt audiences once again were ready to embrace the nostalgia craze started by the successful revivals of No, No, Nanette, Irene, and his own Very Good Eddie several years earlier, and augmented the familiar songs from the film's soundtrack with a liberal dose of popular tunes from the Dubin-Warren catalog. According to theater historian John Kenrick, "When the curtain slowly rose to reveal forty pairs of tap-dancing feet, the star-studded opening night audience at the Winter Garden cheered...Champion followed this number with a series of tap-infused extravaganzas larger and more polished than anything Broadway really had in the 1930s."

== Productions ==
=== Original Broadway production (1980–1989) ===
In June 1980, the musical premiered in out-of-town tryouts at the John F. Kennedy Center for the Performing Arts, which is located in Washington, D.C. The musical opened on Broadway on August 25, 1980, at the Winter Garden Theatre, and then moved to the Majestic and finally to the St. James, closing on January 8, 1989, after 3,486 performances and 6 previews. The production was directed and choreographed by Gower Champion. It was produced by David Merrick and featured orchestrations by Philip J. Lang. The original cast included Jerry Orbach as Julian Marsh, Tammy Grimes as Dorothy Brock, Wanda Richert as Peggy Sawyer, and Lee Roy Reams as Billy Lawlor. Notable replacements included Barry Nelson and Don Chastain and Jamie Ross who played Julian for the last three years of its Broadway run, Elizabeth Allen, Dolores Gray and Millicent Martin as Dorothy, and Lisa Brown, Mary Cadorette and Karen Ziemba as Peggy. (Karen Prunzik, who originated the role of Anytime Annie, briefly played the role of Peggy when Wanda Richert became ill and her understudy abruptly quit the show.) The show's designers, Robin Wagner (sets), Theoni V. Aldredge (costumes), and Tharon Musser (lights) were the same team who had designed the original Broadway production of A Chorus Line. The original Broadway production is the 17th longest running show in Broadway history, as of July 6, 2025.

However, the opening night triumph was overshadowed by tragedy. Following a lengthy standing ovation, Merrick went onstage and stated, "This is a very tragic moment... I'm sorry to have to report that today, Gower Champion died." According to The Washington Post, the first part of his announcement was met with a few laughs from the audience, who thought this was another example of Merrick's publicity stunts. But as soon as he said that Champion had died, there were "gasps and screams." He then embraced a crying Richert, who was making her Broadway debut at the time. The producer had told only Bramble of Champion's death and they managed to withhold the news from the cast (including Richert, who was the director's girlfriend), the crew, and the public prior to the curtain call. 42nd Street proved to be not only Champion's last show but Merrick's final success. Merrick lived until April 25, 2000, but, as described by Anthony Bianco, 42nd Street "was his last big hit, his swan song".

This Tony Award–nominated wardrobe, designed by Theoni V. Aldredge, is on rotating display at the Wick Theatre and Costume Museum in Boca Raton, Florida.

=== West End (1984–1989) ===
The West End production opened at the Theatre Royal Drury Lane on August 8, 1984, starring James Laurenson as Julian Marsh, Georgia Brown as Dorothy Brock, Clare Leach as Peggy Sawyer, Michael Howe as Billy Lawler and Margaret Courtenay as Maggie Jones. Frankie Vaughn later took over as Julian Marsh, with Shani Wallis as Dorothy Brock and Maxine Audley as Maggie Jones. The career of teenaged Catherine Zeta-Jones, a chorus member in the 1984 West End production, was launched when a vacation and an illness felled both the actress portraying Peggy Sawyer and her understudy when one of the producers happened to be in the audience. Zeta-Jones filled-in and was impressive enough to be cast permanently in the role shortly afterward. The Production closed on January 7, 1989 after nearly 5 years, one day before the original Broadway production closed.

=== International productions ===
A San Francisco production opened at the Golden Gate Theatre on February 19, 1985, and ran through July 20, concurrently with the original Broadway production.

The Sydney production of 42nd Street opened on June 2, 1989, at Her Majesty's Theatre, Sydney. It closed July 28, 1990. The show starred Barry Quin as Julian Marsh, Nancye Hayes as Dorothy Brock, Leonie Page as Peggy Sawyer, Todd McKenney as Billy Lawler and Toni Lamond as Maggie Jones, with Dein Perry as Andy Lee.

After the closure of the resident Theatre Royal Drury Lane production, the show would see a return engagement at the Dominion Theatre for a limited run between February 27 to April 20, 1991. Most notably the production featured Richard Armitage who was a part of the chorus.

A new production was staged for the Chichester Festival at the Chichester Festival Theatre in summer 2011. It was directed by Paul Kerryson with new choreography by Andrew Wright and starred Kathryn Evans as Dorothy and Tim Flavin as Julian. This production transferred to Curve in Leicester for the Christmas 2011 season (breaking all previous box office records for the theatre). Tim Flavin reprised his role, Ria Jones played Dorothy and Daisy Maywood portrayed Peggy.

=== UK tours ===
The limited-run production at the Dominion Theatre toured the UK starring Bonnie Langford as Peggy. Three more UK Touring productions were produced by UK Productions in 1997, 1999 and 2000. Gemma Craven starred as Dorothy in the 1997 tour, Ruth Madoc starred as Dorothy in the 1999 and 2000 productions and James Smillie starred as Julian Marsh in all three productions. The 2001 production, by UK Productions, toured the UK in 2007. The cast included Paul Nicholas as Julian for the first part of the tour, later replaced by Dave Willetts, Julia J. Nagle as Dorothy, Jessica Punch as Peggy, Graham Hoadly as Bert Barry, Shirley Jameson as Maggie Jones and Ashley Nottingham as Billy. UK Productions mounted a second UK tour of the show in 2012 with Dave Willetts reprising the role of Julian, Marti Webb playing Dorothy, Graham Hoadly as Bert Barry, Carol Ball as Maggie Jones and Mark Bramble directing. A 2023 production run began in May 2023, which starred Ruthie Henshall as Dorothy Brock, Adam Garcia as Julian Marsh, Josefina Gabrielle as Maggie Jones and Les Dennis as Bert Barry, which later concluded in January 2024 when the tour transferred to Toronto.

=== Broadway revival (2001–2005) ===
Bramble revised the book for and directed the Broadway revival, with choreography by Randy Skinner (dance assistant for the original production). It opened, after 31 previews starting April 4, on May 2, 2001, at the Lyric Theatre (formerly the Ford Center for the Performing Arts), where it ran for 1,524 performances and closed January 2, 2005. The cast included Michael Cumpsty as Julian Marsh, Christine Ebersole as Dorothy Brock, Kate Levering as Peggy Sawyer, and David Elder as Billy Lawlor. Meredith Patterson, who made her Broadway musical debut in the chorus and was the understudy for the role of Peggy Sawyer, took over the role in August 2001. Todd Lattimore, who had been a swing and understudy, took the role of Billy. Other notable replacements included Patrick Cassidy and Tom Wopat as Julian and Shirley Jones and Beth Leavel as Dorothy.

=== Stuttgart revival ===
Mark Bramble's Broadway Revival was reproduced in Stuttgart at the Stage Apollo Theater by Stage Entertainment. Performances began November 21, 2003, before closing December 31, 2004. The cast included Kevin Tarte as Julian Marsh, Isabel Dörfler as Dorothy Brock, Karin Seyfried as Peggy Sawyer, Jens Janke as Billy Lawlor, and Daniel Coninx as Abner Dillon.

=== Asia tour ===
An Asia tour of the Broadway revival played major venues throughout China and South Korea, with an English–speaking company directed by Mark Bramble. The cast included Paul Gregory Nelson as Julian, Natalie Buster as Dorothy, Kristen Martin as Peggy, and Charles MacEachern as Billy.

=== US tours ===
A slightly updated version of the 2001 revival, revised and directed by Mark Bramble and choreographed by Randy Skinner, began a United States tour in September 2015, opening in Salt Lake City, Utah on 22 September 2015. Matthew J. Taylor played Julian Marsh, Caitlin Ehlinger played Peggy Sawyer, and Blake Standik played Billy Lawlor. This production with a new cast, would tour the US again, from 2016 to 2017.

=== West End revival ===
A slightly revised version of the 2001 Broadway revival began a West End revival with previews on March 20, 2017, at the Theatre Royal Drury Lane, where the show had its original London production, with an official opening night on April 4. Mark Bramble once again directed and Randy Skinner choreographed. The cast included Sheena Easton in her West End debut as Dorothy Brock, Clare Halse as Peggy Sawyer, Stuart Neal as Billy Lawlor and Tom Lister as Julian Marsh. Bruce Montague who previously starred in the UK Tour reprised his role. Graeme Henderson who previously played the role of Billy Lawlor in the original West End production and Andy in a UK Tour also reprised his role as Andy. The opening night was attended by the Duchess of Cambridge in her role as Royal Patron of the East Anglia Children's Hospices (EACH). On March 19, 2018, Lulu took over from Easton as Dorothy Brock for a 16-week tenure, and Ashley Day took over from Neal as Billy Lawlor, with Lister and Halse remaining in the show. Steph Parry - who in March 2018 joined 42nd Street as understudy for the roles of Dorothy Brock and Maggie Jones - took over from Lulu as Dorothy Brock on July 9, 2018. Bonnie Langford who played the role of Peggy in a previous UK Tour took over as Dorothy Brock on September 3, 2018, until the show closed on January 5, 2019.

The production was recorded in November 2018 and aired live across cinemas in the UK. It eventually aired on PBS's Great Performances' third annual "Broadway's Best" lineup in November 2019.

=== Ogunquit Playhouse ===
Ogunquit Playhouse's production began previews on June 19, 2019, with the official opening on June 21, 2019. Randy Skinner directed and choreographed as it was the first major production since Bramble's passing in February 2019. The cast included Rachel York in a return to the Ogunquit Playhouse stage as Dorothy Brock, Sally Struthers as Maggie Jones, Jessica Wockenfuss as Peggy Sawyer, Steve Blanchard as Julian Marsh and Con O'Shea Creal as Billy Lawlor. The production was assistant-choreographed by Sara Brians who made her Broadway debut with the 2001 revival, and utilized sets designed by Douglas W. Schmidt for previous tours of 42nd Street. Costumes were sourced from a previous production in Stuttgart and various US Tours. Jeffrey Campos served as musical director.

== Plot ==
Act I

Auditions for 1933's newest show, Pretty Lady, are nearly over when Peggy Sawyer, fresh off the bus from Allentown, Pennsylvania, arrives in New York City with valise in hand. Billy Lawlor, already cast as one of the juvenile leads, notices her and hopes to charm her into accepting a date with him ("Young and Healthy"). He informs her she has missed the audition but he can help her bypass that process, but choreographer Andy Lee has no time for Billy's latest conquest and tells her, "Amscray, toots." Embarrassed and flustered, she rushes off, only to run into director Julian Marsh. One-time star Dorothy Brock, indignant at being asked to audition for a role, is reassured by co-writer and producer Bert Barry that he merely wants to make sure the songs are in her key ("Shadow Waltz"). Despite feeling she is a prima donna past her prime, Marsh agrees to cast her in order to get financial backing from her wealthy beau, Abner Dillon. Outside the theatre, co-writer and producer Maggie Jones and chorus girls Ann "Anytime Annie" Reilly, Phyllis Dale, and Lorraine Flemming take pity on Peggy and invite her to join them for lunch and some advice. They encourage her to show them a dance routine that is witnessed by Julian, who decides there might be room for one more chorus girl after all ("Go Into Your Dance").

Dorothy and Billy rehearse a kissing scene, but Abner refuses to put money into a show where he has to watch Dorothy kiss someone else. The kiss is removed from Pretty Lady ("You're Getting to be a Habit With Me"). Peggy faints and is taken to Dorothy's dressing room. Pat Denning (Dorothy's secret long-term boyfriend and former vaudeville partner) is there and tries to help her. Dorothy finds them there together and, assuming they are having an affair, blows up at them. Julian overhears the argument and, fearing that Abner will pull funding for the show, decides to end the affair between them. A phone call to an unsavory acquaintance brings Pat a visit from a couple of thugs who convince him to break it off with her. The show's cast then departs to Arch Street Theatre in Philadelphia, for the out-of-town tryout ("Getting Out of Town").

The scenery and costumes will not arrive on time, but the cast begins their dress rehearsal regardless ("Dames/Keep Young and Beautiful/Dames (Reprise)"). Peggy asks Julian if he will be attending a planned party, and he accepts because he is attracted to her. At the party, a drunk Dorothy, who misses Pat, tells Abner she was only with him because of his money and breaks up with him. Abner wants to close the show, but he is convinced to keep it running. Dorothy finds Pat, but he is once again driven off by Julian at the hands of the gangsters. Peggy tries to warn Pat, and Dorothy catches them together, becoming greatly upset ("I Only Have Eyes For You" and "Boulevard of Broken Dreams").

"Pretty Lady" finally opens ("We're in the Money"), but someone bumps into Peggy, which causes her to knock over Dorothy. When Dorothy cannot get up, an angered Julian immediately fires Peggy, and tells the audience that the show is canceled.

Act II

Dorothy's ankle is broken, and the show may close, but the chorus kids will not give up ("Sunny Side to Every Situation"). The chorus kids, certain Peggy could fill the lead role, find Julian and tell him that she's a fresh young face who can sing and dance circles around Dorothy. He decides it is worth a shot and rushes off to the train station to catch her before she departs. At Philadelphia's Broad Street Station, Julian apologizes to Peggy and asks her to stay and star in the show, but she responds that she has had enough of show business and wants to go home to Allentown. Dumbfounded, he tries to coax her with the words "Come on along and listen to the lullaby of Broadway..." After the cast joins him in the serenade, she decides to accept his offer ("Lullaby of Broadway"). Forced to learn the part in two days, Peggy is about to mentally collapse when Dorothy, who has been watching the rehearsals, unexpectedly visits her and realizes that beneath her nervous exterior, Peggy is good, "maybe even better than I would have been". She even offers a little friendly advice on how to perform the last song, "About a Quarter to Nine."

It is time for the curtain to rise again ("Shuffle Off to Buffalo"). The opening night curtain is about to rise when Julian, now completely in love with Peggy, stops by for a last minute lip-lock and pep talk in which he utters the now iconic line, "You're going out there a youngster, but you've got to come back a star!" The show is a huge success sure to catapult her into stardom ("42nd Street"). In addition, although she is invited to and expected to attend the official opening night party, she decides to go to the chorus one instead. Julian is left alone onstage with only a single ghost light casting his huge shadow on the back wall. He quietly begins to sing, "Come and meet those dancing feet on the avenue I'm taking you to...42nd Street" ("42nd Street (Reprise)").

== Characters ==
Source: Tams-Witmark Synopsis

- Peggy Sawyer – Nervous but enthusiastic new chorus girl from Allentown, Pennsylvania.
- Billy Lawlor – Leading tenor in Pretty Lady.
- Dorothy Brock – Past her prime Prima Donna, renowned for inability to dance.
- Julian Marsh – Famous, but notorious, director.
- Maggie Jones – Co-writer and producer of Pretty Lady.
- Bert Barry – Co-writer and producer of Pretty Lady.
- Andy Lee – Choreographer of Pretty Lady.
- Pat Denning – Dorothy's former vaudeville partner and romantic interest.
- Abner Dillon – Producer of Pretty Lady and Dorothy's "Sugar Daddy".
- Mac – Stage Manager of Pretty Lady.
- Ann “Anytime Annie” Reilly, Lorraine Flemming, Phyllis Dale, and Gladys – Experienced chorus girls who help Peggy.
- Oscar – Onstage rehearsal pianist for the show Pretty Lady.

== Notable casts ==
| Character | Broadway (1980) | U.S. Tour (1984) | West End (1984) | Broadway (2001) | U.S. Tour (2002) | Japan & U.S. Tour (2004) | Asian Tour (2007) | Chichester (2011) | Leicester (2012) | U.S. Tour (2015) | Théâtre du Châtelet (2017) | West End (2017) | Ogunquit Playhouse (2019) | U.K. Tour (2023) |
|---|---|---|---|---|---|---|---|---|---|---|---|---|---|---|
| Peggy Sawyer | Wanda Richert | Nana Visitor | Clare Leach | Kate Levering | Catherine Wreford | Mara Davi | Kristen Martin | Lauren Hall | Daisy Maywood | Caitlin Ehlinger | Monique Young | Clare Halse | Jessica Wockenfuss | Nicole-Lily Baisden |
| Billy Lawlor | Lee Roy Reams | Lee Roy Reams | Michael Howe | David Elder | Robert Spring | Kyle Dean Massey | Charles MacEachern | Oliver Brenin | Francis Haugen | Blake Stadnik | Dan Burton | Stuart Neal | Con O’Shea-Creal | Sam Lips |
| Dorothy Brock | Tammy Grimes | Millicent Martin | Georgia Brown | Christine Ebersole | Blair Ross | Natalie Buster | Natalie Buster | Kathryn Evans | Ria Jones | Kaitlin Lawrence | Ria Jones | Sheena Easton | Rachel York | Ruthie Henshall |
| Julian Marsh | Jerry Orbach | Jon Cypher | James Laurenson | Michael Cumpsty | Patrick Ryan Sullivan | Ron Smith | Paul Gregory Nelson | Tim Flavin | Tim Flavin | Matthew J. Taylor | Alexander Hanson | Tom Lister | Steve Blanchard | Adam Garcia |
| Maggie Jones | Carole Cook | Carole Cook | Margaret Courtenay | Mary Testa | Patti Mariano | Maureen Illmensee | Karen McDonald | Louise Plowright | Geraldine Fitzgerald | Britte Steel | Jennie Dale | Jasna Ivir | Sally Struthers | Josefina Gabrielle |
| Bert Barry | Joseph Bova | Matthew Tobin | Hugh Futcher | Jonathan Freeman | Frank Root | Evan Alboum | Ira Denmark | Christopher Howell | Ross Finnie | Steven Bidwell | Carl Sanderson | Christopher Howell | Kilty Reidy | Les Dennis |
| Andy Lee | Danny Carroll | James Dybas | Maurice Lane | Michael Arnold | Dexter Jones | Jeffery Williams | Chris Clay | Alan Burkitt | Alan Burkitt | Lamont Brown | Stephane Anelli | Graeme Henderson | Jake Weinstein | Alyn Hawke |
| Pat Denning | James Congdon | Gary Holcombe | Bob Sessions | Richard Muenz | Daren Kelly | David Grant | Rockford Sansom | Steven Houghton | Stuart Ramsey | DJ Canaday | Matthew McKenna | Norman Bowman | Ryan K. Bailer | Michael Praed |
| Abner Dillon | Don Crabtree | Iggie Wolfington | Ralph Lawton | Michael McCarty | Paul Ainsley | Bill Hensley | Lew Lloyd | Steve Fortune | Steve Fortune | Mark Fishback | Teddy Kempner | Bruce Montague | Cliff Bemis | Anthony Ofoegbu |
| Mac | Stan Page | Lonnie Burr | Brent Verdon | Allen Fitzpatrick | Michael Fitzpatrick | Rusty Vance | Richard Riaz Yoder | David Lucas | | Carlos Morales | Scott Emerson | Mark McKerracher | Patrick Heffernan | Kevin Brewis |
| Ann “Anytime Annie” Reilly | Karen Pruczik | Rose Scudder | Carol Ball | Mylinda Hill | Alana Salvatore | Kimberly Ann Hoey | Veronica DiPerna | Lisa Donmall Reeve | Lisa Donmall Reeve | Natalia Lepore Hagan | Emma Kate Nelson | Emma Caffrey | Megan McLaughlin | Sarah Marie Maxwell |
| Lorraine Flemming | Ginny King | Marla Singer | Felicity Lee | Megan Sikora | Kristen Gaetz | Michelle Whitty | Lani Corson | Pippa Raine | Ebony Molina | Vanessa Mitchell | Charlie Allen | Ella Martine | Melissa Schott | Briana Craig |
| Phyllis Dale | Jeri Kansas | Nancy Bickel | Catherine Terry | Catherine Wreford | Angela Kahle | Randi Kaye | Julie Rees | Kate Nelson | Lisa Ritchie | Mallory Nolting | Chantel Bellew | Clare Rickard | Lily Lewis | Aimee Hodnett |
| Oscar | Robert Colston | Bob Gorman | Art Day | Billy Stritch | Tom Judson | Rob Ouellette | Rob Ouellette | Peter McCarthy | | Rob Ouellette | Barnaby Thompson | Paul Knight | | Grant Walsh |

=== Notable replacements ===
==== Broadway (1980–1989) ====
- Peggy Sawyer: Mary Cadorette, Lisa Brown, Karen Ziemba
- Billy Lawlor: Jim Walton
- Dorothy Brock: Elizabeth Allen, Millicent Martin, Dolores Gray, Louise Troy, Anne Rogers
- Julian Marsh: Don Chastain, Jamie Ross, Barry Nelson
- Maggie Jones: Peggy Cass, Denise Lor, Bobo Lewis
- Ann “Anytime Annie” Reilly: Beth Leavel

==== U.S. Tour (1984–1988) ====
- Billy Lawlor: Jim Walton
- Dorothy Brock: Elizabeth Allen, Dolores Gray
- Julian Marsh: Ron Holgate, Barry Nelson
- Maggie Jones: Bibi Osterwald, Denise Lor
- Ann “Anytime Annie” Reilly: Beth Leavel

==== West End (1984–1989) ====
- Peggy Sawyer: Catherine Zeta-Jones
- Dorothy Brock: Jill Gascoine, Shani Wallis
- Julian Marsh: Kenneth Nelson, Frankie Vaughan

==== Broadway (2001–2005) ====
- Peggy Sawyer: Meredith Patterson
- Dorothy Brock: Beth Leavel, Shirley Jones, Blair Ross
- Julian Marsh: Tom Wopat, Patrick Cassidy
- Ann “Anytime Annie” Reilly: Lena Hall

==== West End (2017–2019) ====
- Dorothy Brock: Lulu, Bonnie Langford
- Pat Denning: Matthew Goodgame

== Recordings ==
=== Audio recordings ===
42nd Street discography, audio recordings
| Year | Production | Recording location | Label |
|---|---|---|---|
| 1980 | Original Broadway Cast | RCA Studios, New York City | RCA Red Seal; Cat: RCD1-3891 |
| 1989 | Australian Cast | | RCA Red Seal; Cat: VRCD-0812 |
| 1989 | Argentinian Cast | | |
| 1990 | First studio cast, highlights | | Tring; Cat: GRF-357 |

== Musical numbers ==
Act I

- "Overture" – Orchestra
- "Audition" – Dancers
- "Young and Healthy" – Billy and Peggy†
- "Shadow Waltz" – Maggie, Dorothy, and Girls
- "Shadow Waltz (Reprise)" – Dorothy*
- "Go into Your Dance" – Maggie, Peggy, Annie, Phyllis, Lorraine, Gladys, and Andy
- "You're Getting to Be a Habit with Me" – Dorothy
- "Getting Out of Town" – Maggie, Bert, Pat, and Chorus
- "Dames" – Billy and Chorus
- "Keep Young and Beautiful/Dames Reprise" – Bert, Maggie and Ensemble**
- "I Know Now" – Dorothy, Chorus and Billy*
- "I Only Have Eyes for You" – Dorothy and Billy**
- "Boulevard of Broken Dreams" – Dorothy**
- "We're in the Money" – Annie, Phyllis, Lorraine, Gladys, Peggy, Billy, and Chorus†
- "Act One Finale" – Dorothy and Orchestra*

Act II

- "Entr'acte" – Orchestra*
- "Sunny Side to Every Situation" – Annie and Chorus
- "Lullaby of Broadway" – Julian and Company
- "Getting Out of Town (Reprise)" – Company**
- "About a Quarter to Nine" – Dorothy and Peggy
- "With Plenty of Money and You" – Men Ensemble**
- "Shuffle Off to Buffalo" – Maggie, Bert, Annie, and Girls
- "42nd Street" – Peggy with Dancing Company
- "42nd Street (Reprise)" – Julian
- "Finale Ultimo" – Full Company and Orchestra

*Not included on the original cast recording

**Not included in the original production

† On the original cast recording, "Young and Healthy" follows "Shadow Waltz" while "We're in the Money" follows "Getting Out Of Town"

== Awards and nominations ==
=== Original Broadway production ===
| Year | Award Ceremony | Category | Nominee | Result | Ref. |
|---|---|---|---|---|---|
| 1981 | Drama Desk Award | Outstanding Musical | | Nominated | |
| 1981 | Drama Desk Award | Outstanding Featured Actor in a Musical | Lee Roy Reams | Nominated | |
| 1981 | Drama Desk Award | Outstanding Choreography | Gower Champion | Won | |
| 1981 | Drama Desk Award | Outstanding Costume Design | Theoni V. Aldredge | Won | |
| 1981 | Theatre World Award | | Wanda Richert | Won | |
| 1981 | Tony Award | Best Musical | | Won | |
| 1981 | Tony Award | Best Book of a Musical | Michael Stewart and Mark Bramble | Nominated | |
| 1981 | Tony Award | Best Performance by a Featured Actor in a Musical | Lee Roy Reams | Nominated | |
| 1981 | Tony Award | Best Performance by a Featured Actress in a Musical | Wanda Richert | Nominated | |
| 1981 | Tony Award | Best Direction of a Musical | Gower Champion (posthumous) | Nominated | |
| 1981 | Tony Award | Best Choreography | Gower Champion (posthumous) | Won | |
| 1981 | Tony Award | Best Costume Design | Theoni V. Aldredge | Nominated | |
| 1981 | Tony Award | Best Lighting Design | Tharon Musser | Nominated | |

=== Original London production ===
| Year | Award Ceremony | Category | Nominee | Result | Ref. |
|---|---|---|---|---|---|
| 1984 | Evening Standard Award | Best Musical | | Won | |
| 1984 | Laurence Olivier Award | Best New Musical | | Won | |
| 1984 | Laurence Olivier Award | Actress of the Year in a Musical | Clare Leach | Nominated | |

=== 2001 Broadway revival ===
| Year | Award Ceremony | Category | Nominee | Result | Ref. |
|---|---|---|---|---|---|
| 2001 | Drama Desk Award | Outstanding Revival of a Musical | | Won | |
| 2001 | Drama Desk Award | Outstanding Actress in a Musical | Christine Ebersole | Nominated | |
| 2001 | Drama Desk Award | Outstanding Choreography | Randy Skinner | Nominated | |
| 2001 | Drama Desk Award | Outstanding Set Design | Douglas W. Schmidt | Nominated | |
| 2001 | Drama Desk Award | Outstanding Costume Design | Roger Kirk | Nominated | |
| 2001 | Tony Award | Best Revival of a Musical | | Won | |
| 2001 | Tony Award | Best Performance by a Leading Actress in a Musical | Christine Ebersole | Won | |
| 2001 | Tony Award | Best Performance by a Featured Actress in a Musical | Kate Levering | Nominated | |
| 2001 | Tony Award | Best Performance by a Featured Actress in a Musical | Mary Testa | Nominated | |
| 2001 | Tony Award | Best Direction of a Musical | Mark Bramble | Nominated | |
| 2001 | Tony Award | Best Choreography | Randy Skinner | Nominated | |
| 2001 | Tony Award | Best Scenic Design | Douglas W. Schmidt | Nominated | |
| 2001 | Tony Award | Best Costume Design | Roger Kirk | Nominated | |
| 2001 | Tony Award | Best Lighting Design | Paul Gallo | Nominated | |

=== 2017 West End revival ===
| Year | Award Ceremony | Category | Nominee | Result | Ref. |
|---|---|---|---|---|---|
| 2018 | Laurence Olivier Award | Best Musical Revival | | Nominated | |
| 2018 | Laurence Olivier Award | Best Theatre Choreographer | Randy Skinner | Nominated | |
| 2018 | Laurence Olivier Award | Best Costume Design | Roger Kirk | Nominated | |
