= Noël Coward Society =

The Noël Coward Society is an international society founded with the agreement of Coward's literary agent and estate to celebrate the life and work of Sir Noël Coward.

The Noël Coward Society was founded in 1999 to study, promote, and enjoy the many aspects of Coward's achievements. It owns an extensive archive of recordings and written works and is attempting to become the official online archive of all things "Coward".

The society is managed by Noël Coward Ltd., a charitable company. It is currently administered from Norwich, Norfolk, UK, and has a membership of just over 700 people worldwide. The day-to-day running of the society is managed by an organising committee. The society has representatives in France, Australia, and the USA. Each year, it celebrates the birth of Noël Coward at the Noël Coward Theatre and the Theatre Royal, Drury Lane on the nearest Friday to his birthdate. The celebration consists of the AGM of the society at the Noël Coward Theatre followed by a celebrity from the theatre world laying flowers on the statue of Sir Noël Coward in the foyer of the Theatre Royal. The Annual Lunch follows in the Grand Saloon at the theatre, followed by a cabaret.

In 2002, Ken Starrett was appointed the North American director of the Noël Coward Society and in 2003, Starrett organized an annual birthday celebration that took place in December in the United States. The event included the flower-laying ceremony at the Gershwin Theatre in Manhattan and a special lunch. Among the celebrities who have placed flowers in front of Coward's statue are Tammy Grimes, Keir Dullea, Tony Walton, Kitty Carlisle Hart, Hayley Mills, Marian Seldes, Jim Dale, Victor Garber, Christine Ebersole, Dick Cavett, Stephen Fry, Joan Copeland, Jamie Ross, Penny Fuller, and Dana Ivey. Also, a similar ceremony is held at Firefly Estate (Coward's home) in Jamaica. On December 31, 2016, Ken Starrett officially stepped down after serving as North American director for 14 years. In March 2017, for his services and contributions to the Noël Coward Society as well as being instrumental in introducing Noël Coward's music and songs to many cabaret performers, Ken Starrett was awarded the Board of Directors Award at the 31st annual MAC Awards. In 2018, Ken Starrett's position as US director of the Noël Coward Society was taken over by Jeffrey Hardy.
