= Jamie Ross =

Scottish-American actor

Jamie Ross (born 4 May 1939 in Markinch) is a Scottish-American actor, best known for his work on Broadway.

== Career ==
Ross made his Broadway debut in 1971 as Major Caldwell in Leon Uris's short lived musical Ari. His first major success with American audiences was when he appeared Off-Broadway in the original 1972 production of Noël Coward's Oh, Coward! at the New Theatre with Roderick Cook and Barbara Cason. A tremendous success with both audiences and critics, the show ran for 294 performances. He returned to Broadway in 1981 to portray Larry Donovan and later Sam Craig in John Kander and Fred Ebb's Woman of the Year. As Sam he got to play the romantic interest of the character Tess which was portrayed in turns by Lauren Bacall, Raquel Welch, and Debbie Reynolds during his lengthy stay with the show.

In 1984 he replaced Gene Barry as Georges in the original production of Jerry Herman's La Cage aux Folles. He returned to Broadway again the following year to portray Julian Marsh in Harry Warren's 42nd Street, which had previously been portrayed by Jerry Orbach earlier in the show's run. In 1990 he replaced Jonathan Hadary as Herby in the revival of Gypsy, portraying the role opposite Linda Lavin's Rose. In 1995 he portrayed Josephus Gage in the revival of Jule Styne's Gentlemen Prefer Blondes after which he spent the next several years portraying Maurice in Tim Rice's musical version of Beauty and the Beast.

In December 2014, Ross, along with nonagenarian actress Joan Copeland was invited by the Noël Coward Society to lay flowers on the statue of Sir Noël Coward at The Gershwin Theatre in Manhattan to celebrate the 115th birthday of "The Master".

== Filmography ==
- 'Little Moon of Alban' (1958) (British Soldier)
- 'How the West Was Won' (1962) (Bruce Harvey, uncredited)
- 'Little Moon of Alban' (1964) (British Soldier)
- 'NBC Experiment in Television' (1967) (We Interrupt This Season)
- 'Emergency!' (1973) (Jason Channing) (An English Visitor)
- 'The American Woman: Portraits of Courage' (1976) (Minister)
- 'The Next Man' (1976) (British Attaché)
- 'The Other Side of Victory' (1976)
- 'The Halloween That Almost Wasn't' (1979) (Father)
- '42nd Street' (1986) (Julian Marsh)
