= Gentlemen Prefer Blondes (musical) =

1949 musical

- 1949 Broadway Playbill
- Music: Jule Styne
- Lyrics: Leo Robin
- Book: Joseph Fields; Anita Loos
- Basis: Gentlemen Prefer Blondes by Anita Loos
- Productions: 1949 Broadway; 1962 West End; 1995 Broadway revival

Gentlemen Prefer Blondes is a musical with a book by Joseph Fields and Anita Loos, lyrics by Leo Robin, and music by Jule Styne, based on the best-selling 1925 novel of the same name by Loos. The story involves an American woman's voyage to Paris to perform in a nightclub.

The musical opened on Broadway in 1949 (running for 740 performances and introducing Carol Channing), a London production was mounted in 1962, and there was a Broadway revival in 1995. It was made into a 1953 film of the same name, starring Jane Russell and Marilyn Monroe. The popular songs "Bye Bye Baby" and "Diamonds Are a Girl's Best Friend" were introduced in this musical. An adaptation called Lorelei (also starring Carol Channing) was performed on Broadway in 1974.

== Synopsis ==
Act I

In the 1920s, Lorelei Lee, a blonde from Little Rock, Arkansas, and her friend Dorothy Shaw board the ocean liner Ile de France, to embark for France ("It's High Time"). Lorelei and her boyfriend, Gus Esmond, are parting for a while ("Bye, Bye Baby"); Gus is going to Little Rock, and Dorothy is Lorelei's chaperone. On the ship, Lorelei has many admirers, including the rich Philadelphian Henry Spofford III, and an Englishman, Sir Francis (Piggy) Beekman. Lorelei is worried that Gus will find out about an old secret of hers and break off their engagement ("I'm Just A Little Girl From Little Rock"), and she is afraid to open a wire that she receives from him.

Meanwhile, Dorothy flirts with a group of olympic sportsmen ("I Love What I'm Doing (When I'm Doing It For Love)"). Lorelei disapproves of this as the Olympians are poor; she is sure that Gus has broken up with her and tells Dorothy that they need to find some rich men. Lorelei chooses the zipper king, Josephus Gage. For Dorothy she chooses Henry Spofford. Lady Beekman is trying to sell her tiara to an American. Lorelei wishes to buy it, but does not have the money, so she decides to persuade Sir Francis to lend her the money ("It's Delightful Down In Chile").

On arrival in Paris, Dorothy and Henry are becoming attracted to each other ("Sunshine"). Two French detectives, Robert and Louie Lemanteur, are looking for Lorelei, trying to recover Lady Beekman's tiara. They don't speak much English, but they fall for the charms of the girls and offer to take them out. Josephus Gage arrives with Lorelei, wearing the first French dress to use a zipper. It is suggested that everyone have cocktails, to Mrs Spofford's delight, but Josephus does not drink, instead eating raw carrots ("I'm a Tingle I'm Aglow"). Henry, left alone with Dorothy, proposes marriage ("You Say You Care"), but she says that she is not good enough for him.

Gus arrives suddenly and discovers that Lorelei is dating Josephus. His father has always disapproved of Lorelei. Gus retaliates by dating Gloria Stark, a dancer, promising to make her a star.

Act II

Everyone is at a Paris club. Lady Beekman and the two detectives are still trying to recover her tiara. Sir Francis is there with two ladies. Lorelei and Dorothy are there with Josephus and Henry. Gus arrives and nearly comes to blows with Josephus. The floor show includes performances by Gloria ("Mamie Is Mimi") and Coquette. After Lorelei walks around the streets of Paris reflecting singing ("Diamonds are a Girl's Best Friend"). Gus tells Lorelei that he loves her so much that he would leave his father's business for her sake. She admits that she shot a man in Little Rock, but it was in self-defense (the man was attempting to rape her), so she was acquitted; they make up.

The Americans miss the United States ("Homesick Blues") and go home. Lorelei delays marrying Gus until his father accepts her. Mrs. Spofford gives Dorothy some advice ("Keeping Cool with Coolidge"). Gus's father, Mr. Esmond, arrives and finds that Lorelei is wearing a dress covered in his buttons and that she knows everything about his business ("Button Up with Esmond"). He is impressed and approves of the marriage.

== Songs ==
Act I

- "Overture" – Orchestra
- "It's High Time" – Dorothy Shaw and Ensemble
- "Bye, Bye Baby" – Gus Esmond and Lorelei Lee
- "I'm Just A Little Girl From Little Rock" – Lorelei Lee
- Encore: "I'm Just A Little Girl From Little Rock" – Lorelei Lee
- Dance Encore: "I'm Just A Little Girl From Little Rock" – Orchestra
- "I Love What I'm Doing" – Dorothy Shaw
- Dance: "I Love What I'm Doing" – Orchestra
- "Just a Kiss Apart" – Henry Spofford
- "Scherzo" (Gloria's Dance) – Orchestra
- "It's Delightful Down in Chile" – Sir Francis Beekman, Lorelei Lee, Show Girls and Male Ensemble
- "Sunshine" – Henry Spofford and Dorothy Shaw
- "Park Scene" – Chorus and Dancers
- "Pas De Deux" – Orchestra
- "Sunshine (Reprise)" – Ensemble
- "I'm A'Tingle, I'm A'Glow" – Josephus Gage
- "You Say You Care" – Dorothy Shaw and Henry Spofford
- "Finale Act I" ("I'm Just A Little Girl From Little Rock") – Lorelei Lee and Ensemble

Act II

- "Entr'acte" – Orchestra
- "Mamie is Mimi" – Gloria Stark, Coles and Atkins
- "Coquette" – The Tenor and Show Girls
- "Diamonds Are a Girl's Best Friend" – Lorelei Lee
- First Encore: "Diamonds Are a Girl's Best Friend" – Lorelei Lee
- Second Encore: "Diamonds Are a Girl's Best Friend" – Lorelei Lee
- "Gentlemen Prefer Blondes" – Lorelei Lee and Gus Esmond
- "Homesick Blues" – Lorelei Lee, Dorothy Shaw, Gus Esmond, Henry Spofford, Mrs. Ella Spofford and Josephus Gage
- "Keeping Cool with Coolidge" – Dorothy Shaw, Bill and Ensemble
- "Button Up With Esmond" – Lorelei Lee, Show Girls and Ensemble
- "Finale Act II" ("Gentlemen Prefer Blondes" and "Bye, Bye Baby") – Lorelei Lee, Gus Esmond and Ensemble

== Casts (1940s-1970s) ==
| Character | Original Broadway Production | US West Coast National Tour | First US National Tour | Second US National Tour | Film Version | Pittsburgh Civic Light Opera Production | The Muny Production | The Muny Production | Casa Mañana Production | Music Fair Circuit Production | Original West End Production | Summer Stock Tour | Melody Top Theatre Production | Kenley Players Production | Music Fair Circuit Production |
| Character | 1949-1951 | 1950 | 1951-1952 | 1952 | 1953 | | 1954 | 1959 | 1960 | | 1962-1963 | 1964 | | 1966 | |
|---|---|---|---|---|---|---|---|---|---|---|---|---|---|---|---|
| Lorelei Lee | Carol Channing | Gertrude Niesen | Carol Channing | Iva Withers | Marilyn Monroe | Kyle MacDonnell | Sandra Deel | Maureen Cannon | Emmaline Henry | Jane Morgan | Dora Bryan | Jayne Mansfield | Betty Hutton | Carroll Baker | Jayne Mansfield |
| Dorothy Shaw | Yvonne Adair | Nancy Andrews | Yvonne Adair | Pat Wilkes | Jane Russell | Holly Harris | Billie Worth | Betty O’Neil | Joan Fagan | Mildred Slavin | Anne Hart | Kelly Brytt | Lynn Brinker | Marcia Rodd | Patti Karr |
| Gus Edmund, Jr. | John McCauley | John Boles | John McCauley | Harry Stockwell | Tommy Noonan | Harry Stockwell | Donald Burr | James Stevenson | Warren Brown | Wally Koster | Donald Stewart | Robert Gallagher | Wally Griffin | Bob Carroll | Alan North |
| Henry Spofford | Eric Brotherson | Edward Dew | Eric Brotherson | Eric Brotherson | Elliott Reid (as Ernie Malone) | Richard Smart | Eric Brotherson | Russell Nype | Charles Barlow | Laurence Stith | David Morton | Laurence Stith | Paul Dixon | Steve Elmore | Stanley Grover |
| Mrs. Ella Spofford | Alice Pearce | Irene Ryan | Mary Finney | Marion Weeks | —N/a | Marion Weeks | Mary Finney | Camila Ashland | Lucy Greeno | Ethel Woodruff | Bessie Love | Hildegarde Halliday | Eleanore Knapp | Hildegarde Halliday | Camila Ashland |
| Sir Francis Beekman | Rex Evans | Arthur Gould-Porter | Robert Chisholm | Hal Thompson | Charles Coburn | Fred Harper | Robert Eckles | Jonathan Morris | Jack Harrold | Erik Rhodes | Guy Middleton | John Cecil Holm | Val Bettin | Brooks Morton | Merwin Goldsmith |
| Lady Phyllis Beekman | Reta Shaw | Kate Drain Lawson | Reta Shaw | Reta Shaw | Norma Varden | Florence Dunlap | Philippa Bevans | Marguerite Shaw | Marguerite Shaw | Madeline Clive | Totti Truman Taylor | Margaretta Warwick | Fran Ryan | Lucille Benson | Millie Hughes |
| Gloria Stark | Anita Alvarez | Evelyn Taylor | Anita Alvarez | Evelyn Taylor | —N/a | Anita Alvarez | Evelyn Taylor | Maybin Hewes | Mary Jane Ferguson | Rae McLean | Valerie Walsh | April Nevins | Pat Cope | Pegi Wyland | Isabelle Farrell |
| Josephus Gage | George S. Irving | Rufus Smith | Morley Meredith | Rufus Smith | —N/a | Victor Clarke | Norbert Winkler | Michael Kermoyan | Arthur Newman | Christopher Koval | Michael Malnick | Mickey Hargitay | Charles L. Gibson | David Hartman | Robert Brooks |
| Robert Lemanteur | Mort Marshall | Bob Jellison | Jerry Jarrett | Arte Johnson | —N/a | Le Roi Operti | Stanley Simmonds | Joseph Cusanelli | John Smith | Zale Kessler | John Heawood | Leo Bloom | Zale Kessler | ? | Sam Stoneburner |
| Louis Lemanteur | Howard Morris | Norman Budd | Don Raebern | Jim Eiler | —N/a | Floyd Lisle | Joey Fitter | Art Wallace | Stan Malvin | Don Potter | Michael Ashlin | Charles Abbate | Howard Girven | ? | Don Prieur |
| Mr. Esmond, Sr. | Irving Mitchell | Thayer Roberts | Irving Mitchell | Irving Mitchell | Taylor Holmes | Leonard Ceeley | Oliver Cliff | Edmund Lyndeck | John Sullivan | ? | ? | Tom Noel | ? | ? | Sam Stoneburner |
| Coles and Atkins | Charles Coles and Cholly Atkins | Dean Campbell and Willard Giles | Charles Coles and Cholly Atkins | Charles Coles and Cholly Atkins | —N/a | ? | Charles Coles and Cholly Atkins | ? | ? | ? | ? | ? | ? | ? | —N/a |

=== Notable Replacements ===
==== Original Broadway Production (1949–1951) ====
- Lorelei Lee: Bibi Osterwald (u/s)
- Dorothy Shaw: Shirl Conway, Bibi Osterwald
- Henry Spofford: George S. Irving (u/s)
- Mrs. Ella Spofford: Paula Trueman
- Lady Phyllis Beekman: Lucilla Udovich (u/s)
- Gloria Stark: Polly Ward (u/s)
- Robert Lemanteur: Howard Morris (u/s)
- Mr. Esmond, Sr.: George S. Irving (u/s)

==== First US National Tour (1951–1952) ====
- Lorelei Lee: Iva Withers
- Dorothy Shaw: Shirl Conway
- Gus Edmund, Jr.: Harry Stockwell
- Robert Lemanteur: Arte Johnson

== Casts (1980s-2020s) ==
| Character | US Regional Tour | US National Tour | Goodspeed Musicals Production | Broadway Revival | North Shore Music Theatre Production | Kenley Players Production | Westbury Music Fair Production | West End Revival | Reprise Theatre Company Production | 5th Avenue Theatre Concert | Westchester Broadway Theatre Production | Dallas Regional Concert (CANCELED) | Gateway Playhouse Production | Encores! Production | West End Concert Production |
| Character | 1986 | 1993 | 1994 | 1995 | | | 1998 | | 2002 | 2005 | | 2007 | | 2012 | 2027 |
|---|---|---|---|---|---|---|---|---|---|---|---|---|---|---|---|
| Lorelei Lee | Morgan Fairchild | Stella Parton | KT Sullivan | KT Sullivan | Robyn Griggs | Loni Anderson | Barbara Eden | Sara Crowe | Alice Ripley | Faith Prince | Brandi Wooten | Faith Prince | Elizabeth Stanley | Megan Hilty | Megan Hilty |
| Dorothy Shaw | Debbie Gravitte | Catherine Hart | Karen Prunczik | Karen Prunczik | Stephanie Pope | Angela Bond | Rita McKenzie | Debby Bishop | Valarie Pettiford | Lucy Lawless | Pamela Jordan | M. Denise Lee | Erin Crouch | Rachel York | Rachel Tucker |
| Gus Edmund, Jr. | John O'Hurley | Dennis R. St. Pierre | Allen Fitzpatrick | Allen Fitzpatrick | Marcus Neville | Ronald L. Brown | Robert Jensen | Clive Rowe | Tom Beyer | Stephen Godwin | Richard Roland | —N/a | Paul Clausen | Clarke Thorell | TBA |
| Henry Spofford | John Hillner | ? | George Dvorsky | George Dvorsky | ? | Kelly Woodruff | Steven Edward Moore | Harry Burton | Hugh Panaro | Louis Hobson | Joe Mahowald | —N/a | Duke Lafoon | Aaron Lazar | TBA |
| Mrs. Ella Spofford | Mary Harmon | Treasure Ford | Susan Rush | Susan Rush | ? | Diane Findlay | Mary Ellen Ashley | ? | —N/a | Lori Larsen | Judith Moore | —N/a | Ann Hurst | Deborah Rush | TBA |
| Sir Francis Beekman | Charles Rule | Phil Ford | David Ponting | David Ponting | David Coffee | Leonard Drum | Richard Kinter | ? | Ian Abercrombie | Julian Patrick | Bob Freschi | —N/a | Michael Hayward-Jones | Simon Jones | TBA |
| Lady Phyllis Beekman | Marian Haraldson | ? | Carol Swarbrick | Carol Swarbrick | Marilyn Cooper | Marji Dodrill | Maureen Sadusk | Delia Lindsay | Ruth Williamson | Suzy Hunt | Bill Bateman | —N/a | Susan Scudder | Sandra Shipley | TBA |
| Gloria Stark | Deborah Phelan | ? | —N/a | —N/a | —N/a | —N/a | —N/a | ? | Kimberly Lyon | Jane Lanier | Kimberly Dawn Neumann | —N/a | Lindsey Clayton | Megan Sikora | TBA |
| Josephus Gage | P. J. Benjamin | ? | Jamie Ross | Jamie Ross | ? | Scott Stoney | Kenneth Kantor | Martin Turner | Greg Zerkle | Timothy McCuen Piggee | Steve Asciolla | —N/a | Kurt Robbins | Stephen R. Buntrock | TBA |
| Robert Lemanteur | Robert Fitch | Larry Arthur | Craig Waletzko | Craig Waletzko | ? | ? | ? | ? | Rod Keller | ? | ? | —N/a | David Rossetti | Brennan Brown | TBA |
| Louis Lemanteur | Peter Shawn | Michael McLernon | John Hoshko | John Hoshko | ? | ? | ? | ? | Jeffrey Schecter | ? | ? | —N/a | Eric S. Robertson | Steven Boyer | TBA |
| Mr. Esmond, Sr. | Tony Bevinetto | ? | Dick Decareau | Dick Decareau | Randolph Walker | Dale Young | ? | ? | Ian Abercrombie | —N/a | Bill Bateman | —N/a | Barry Johnson | Brennan Brown | TBA |
| Coles and Atkins | —N/a | —N/a | —N/a | —N/a | —N/a | —N/a | —N/a | —N/a | Lance Roberts and Abe Sylvia | —N/a | —N/a | —N/a | Graham Kurtz and Leajato Robinson | Phillip Attmore and Jared Grimes | TBA |

=== Notable Replacements ===
==== Reprise Theatre Company Production (2002) ====
- Dorothy Shaw: Lena Hall (u/s)

== Productions ==
=== Original Broadway ===
The musical opened on Broadway at the Ziegfeld Theatre on December 8, 1949, and closed September 15, 1951, after 740 performances. It was produced by Herman Levin and Oliver Smith, directed by John C. Wilson, and choreographed by Agnes de Mille, with vocal direction by Hugh Martin. Financial backers included Harold M. Esty Jr.

Several blonde actresses, including Betty Hutton, Jayne Mansfield (Carousel Theater, 1964), Mamie Van Doren, Carroll Baker (Dallas, August 1966), Barbara Eden (Florida, January 1999) and Morgan Fairchild have starred in regional and summer stock productions of Gentlemen Prefer Blondes over the years. Carroll Baker also performed two numbers from the show on The Ed Sullivan Show on 16 October 1966.

=== West End ===
The musical ran in the West End at the Princes Theatre, opening on August 20, 1962, for 223 performances, and featured Dora Bryan as Lorelei Lee, Anne Hart as Dorothy, and Bessie Love as Mrs. Ella Spofford.

=== Broadway 1974 ===
A revised version titled Lorelei opened on Broadway at the Palace Theatre on January 27, 1974, and ran for 320 performances. This production also starred Carol Channing, who received a Tony Award nomination for Best Actress in a Musical.

=== Broadway 1995 ===
The Goodspeed Opera House, East Haddam, Connecticut, revival ran in November 1994, and featured KT Sullivan as Lorelei Lee, Karen Prunzik as Dorothy Shaw, Jamie Ross as Josephus Gage, and Allen Fitzpatrick as Gus Esmond. The production transferred to Broadway at the Lyceum Theatre on April 10, 1995 and closed on April 30, 1995, after 16 previews and 24 performances.

=== Other productions ===
A concert staging of the musical was mounted as part of the "Discovering Lost Musicals" series directed and produced by Ian Marshall-Fisher at Barbican Cinema 1 in London in 1997, which featured Louise Gold as Lorelei Lee, Kim Criswell as Dorothy Shaw, and Dilys Laye as Mrs Ella Spofford.

The Open Air Theatre, Inner Circle, Regent's Park, London, production ran from July 23, 1998, through September 1, 1998, and featured Sara Crowe as Lorelei Lee and Debby Bishop as Dorothy.

42nd Street Moon theatre company, San Francisco, California, presented the musical in April 2004.

A staged concert production was presented in the Encores! series of Great American Musicals in Concert at the New York City Center May 9–13, 2012 with Megan Hilty as Lorelei Lee and Rachel York as Dorothy, directed by John Rando and choreographed by Randy Skinner.

In October 2019, the Union Theatre in London staged a production of the musical, directed and produced by Sasha Regan.

== Film version ==
A 1953 film adaptation, released by 20th Century Fox studios, was directed by Howard Hawks and starred Jane Russell and Marilyn Monroe.

== See also ==
- Legacy Robe, which traces its beginnings to the original Broadway production of Gentleman Prefer Blondes
