= Spy Groove =

Television series

- Created by: Michael Gans; Richard Register; Kevin Thomsen
- Directed by: Elliot M. Bour; Saul Andrew Blinkoff
- Voices of: Michael Gans; Richard Register
- Theme music composer: Peter Min
- Country of origin: United States
- Original language: English
- No. of seasons: 1
- No. of episodes: 13

Production
- Executive producer: Abby Turkuhle
- Producer: Vicki Smith
- Running time: 30 minutes
- Production company: MTV Animation

Original release
- Network: MTV
- Release: June 26, 2000 – May 30, 2001

Spy Groove (also known as SG) is an American adult animated series created by Michael Gans, Richard Register and Kevin Thomsen for MTV. Originally airing for thirteen episodes, it premiered on June 26, 2000 and ended on May 30, 2001. It aired on Teletoon Detour in Canada.

Spy Groove was created by Michael Gans, Richard Register and Kevin Thomsen, who also wrote and performed the voices for the show. The general plot is about two suave yet cocky secret agents, Agent #1 and Agent #2, and their sassy boss, Helena Troy, who assigned them their missions. Like the tone of MTV's animated programs, Spy Groove is consistently tongue-in-cheek and often employs fast-paced banter between the protagonists. It also features a number of pop songs in some episodes at the time of its broadcast.

== Background and artistic style ==
Co-creators Michael Gans and Richard Register were comedy duo performers before becoming writers and utilized their fast-paced rapport in the show based on their acts. The end credits sequence shows the protagonists (voiced by Gans and Register) chat and bicker together on topics irrelevant to the events of each episode, which was the only use of improvisation from the voice actors.

The "Spy Groove" aesthetic is based on artist Glen Hanson's style, who was the art director and designed the characters and settings. It is basic and shiny, with brilliant colours and dark lines. Because of Hanson's caricature work, many characters are modeled after celebrities including Agent #1 and Agent #2, who were modelled after Matt Damon and Ben Affleck, respectively.

As a homage to classic cartoons, the show practices limited animation, with most of the animation being limited to lip-synching, facial expressions, some movements and action scenes, as characters are often still in most scenes of each episode.

== Voice cast and characters ==
=== Main characters ===
- Michael Gans as Agent #1
- Richard Register as Agent #2
- Fuschia! as Helena Troy
- Jessica Shaw as Mac
- Dean Elliott as the Narrator

=== Villains ===
- Erin Quinn Purcell as Sierra Nevada
- Garet Scott as the Contessa
- Koko Austin as Champagne Du Jour

=== Minor/one-off characters ===
- Kevin Thomsen as Dr. Ken, Hector Blanco, General, Captain and Priest
- Maryann Towne as various voices
- Maggie Gans as Bunny von Schnickle and Sonya
- Alison Fraser as Mimi LeVerne and Kathy Lee Gifford
- Julie Halston as Dandelion Splendorface
- Yoshi Amao as Benni and Jaianto Enjin
- Maria Helan Lopez as Margarita Blanco
- Robyn Weiss as Jo Melekelikimaka
- Blair Ross as Windy La Tette
- Ilyana Kadushin as Tasha
- Kei Arita as Kyoko
- Penny Cococafe as Lovely
- Emily Newman as Ashley Perelips
- Lilli Lavine as Melissa Rivers
- Carolyn McDermott as Vegas dealer
- Penny Papachristofilogiannoloulos as Traci Momandpopadopolis
- Shane Guenego as Sailor
- Nadya Ginsburg as various voices
- Maggie Frederic as various voices

== Episodes ==
1. Move Over Miami (Villain: Mr. Fish and Rock Debris)
2. Ski Cats (Villain: The Contessa)
3. Virtual Vegas (Villains: Johnny Nevada and Sierra Nevada)
4. Queen of DeNile (Villain: Champagne Du Jour)
5. Greek Freaks (Villains: Xerxes twins)
6. Spanish on the Fly (Villain: Julio Blanco)
7. Malibooboo (Villain: Connie Lola Andrea LeTete)
8. Cyberberian Sexpress (Villains: Napoleon Pushkin and Sierra Nevada)
9. Sneaky Tiki Taboo (Villain: Nick Nack/The Big Bahoner and Rock Debris)
10. Tokyo Takedown (Villain: Grandmama San's grandson)
11. Brazilian Brew-Ha-Ha (Villain: Leo Macho Grande)
12. Snap, Crackle, Popillon (Villain: Marquis De Guy)
13. Manhattan Glam Chowder (Villain: Mr. Fish and Rock Debris)

== Gadgets ==
The Agents were equipped with high-tech toys disguised as more mundane items. However, keeping with the tone of the series the gadgets often contained various features, functions, and stylish trademarks that often ranged from convenient to the ridiculously useless (at least until the story-line made the item useful). Some examples include:

- A pane of windshield glass that collapses down into a book of matches.
- A corkscrew bottle-opener/thermo-coil/hummingbird feeder.
- Digital, MP3 downloading divining rod (from The Sharper Image)
- Cocktail drink coaster/two-way communicator with digital holographic projection capability.
- Inflatable life-size Ricky Martin decoy.
- "Dry-Spy" optional car modification. Converts a lime green convertible into a lime green submarine.

== Villains ==
The majority of the Spy Groove villains are of the sort found in most secret agent fare. However very few were interested in global domination, but instead obsessed with some little slice of modern culture. For example, a plan to get all top 10 of the most eligible Hollywood bachelors (as defined by Blather magazine) married so that poor #11 would finally get noticed. Or to get every coffee drinker in the world addicted to the villains' own special blend.

Some of the Spy Groove villains include:

- Mr. Fish: a former hypnotist who did guest spots on the old Sonny and Cher show, now obsessed with becoming the absolute creator of the fad of the week. He once tried to destroy Miami by causing a tidal wave, then donating some nearby swampland he had bought to the dispossessed citizens to make New Miami, and then using their gratitude towards him to let him hypnotize them with Bavarian Slap-dancing to a salsa beat. Once hypnotized the people of the international fad capital would adopt whatever fad he told them to, and thus... so would the world.
- Rock Debris: a taciturn and irritable mercenary for hire for several of the Spy Groove villains. He specialized in blowing things up and looking cranky. He's memorable because he was probably the most often seen rogue in the gallery.
- Sierra Nevada: daughter of a wealthy casino tycoon, and herself a robotics genius. She and Agent Number One are star-crossed lovers a la Batman and Catwoman as they both possess intellects that the other can respect. Her robots are often life-like and are mistaken for the people they resemble.
- The Marquis de Guy: the other Prince of Perve (wrestler Goldust being the first one), this Champagne Magnate has an affection for S and M and a few other letters best not considered. He schemed with Mimi Laverve to unleash genetically engineered butterflies to destroy the grape crops of the world's sparkling white wine giants so that whenever anyone toasts the new year, they must toast with him (or at least with his champagne).
