= Wanda Richert =

American singer (born 1958)

- Born: April 18, 1958 (age 68); Chicago, Illinois, US
- Occupations: Actress, singer, dancer, choreographer, director
- Years active: 1975–2007

Wanda Richert (born April 18, 1958) is an American former musical theatre actress, singer, dancer, choreographer, and director.

== Early life and career ==
=== Early life ===
Born in Chicago, Illinois, Wanda Richert was the daughter of George Richert, a chief petty officer in the Coast Guard, and his wife, Lola, an executive secretary. Richert began studying tap and ballet at the age of five. By the time she was in high school, she was already dancing at a Chicago dinner theater, and soon after, began working full-time on the regional theatre circuit.

=== Career ===
Richert got her big break in 1976 when she joined the national company of A Chorus Line. For two and a half years she understudied and played several roles in the production including the role of Cassie.

On August 25, 1980, Wanda Richert made her Broadway debut as Peggy Sawyer in the original Broadway production of 42nd Street. However, the opening night triumph was overshadowed by tragedy. After a lengthy curtain call and a standing ovation, producer David Merrick came onstage and announced that Gower Champion, the director and choreographer of 42nd Street, had died earlier that day.

Richert was nominated for a Tony for Best Featured Actress in a Musical for her performance in 42nd Street. She won the Theatre World Award in 1981 in recognition of her outstanding New York City stage debut performance.

In 1983, Richert replaced Anita Morris in the Broadway production of Nine. In 1985 Michael Bennett asked her to come back into A Chorus Line on Broadway and she played the role of Cassie intermittently for the next five years.

== Broadway credits ==
- 1980: 42nd Street (Peggy Sawyer)
- 1983: Nine (Carla)
- 1985: A Chorus Line (Cassie)

== Film and television credits ==
- 1981: 35th Tony Awards (Self/Nominee/Performer)
- 1982: The Doctors (Julie)
- 1985: 39th Tony Awards (Self/Presenter)
- 1986: Hardcastle and McCormick
- 1990: Law and Order (Aimee)
