= Iva Withers =

American actress and singer

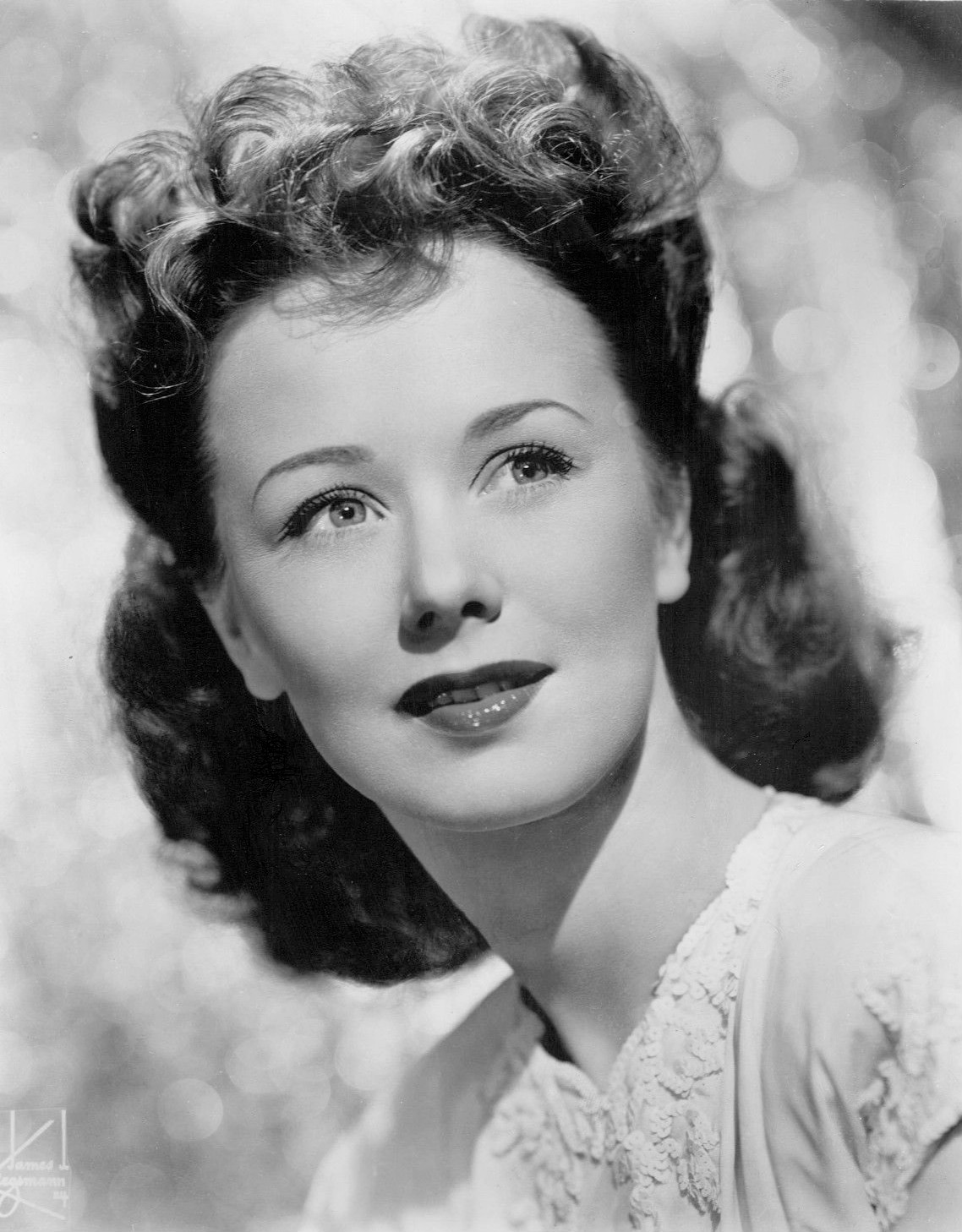
Withers in 1947.

Pearl Iva Edith Withers (July 7, 1917 – October 7, 2014) was a Canadian-born American actress and singer, best remembered as a replacement player who had long runs in some of Rodgers and Hammerstein's biggest musical theatre hits. From 1945 to 1970, she worked almost continuously on Broadway or in national tours, generally as a replacement.

Withers was first hired about 1943 to understudy the leading ladies in the Broadway casts of Oklahoma! and Carousel. She soon replaced the original star of Carousel, playing Julie Jordan more than 600 times on Broadway and becoming the first Julie in London in 1950. She was next a replacement for Adelaide in Guys and Dolls. She was a replacement or standby in more than a half dozen other Broadway shows throughout the 1950s and 1960s, and she also toured North America in the leading roles in Carousel, South Pacific and Gentlemen Prefer Blondes. Her last Broadway role was in Forty Carats (1968–1970), after which she left show business.

== Early life and career ==
Withers was born in Rivers, Manitoba, Canada, the daughter of Roy and Edith Withers, an insurance salesman and a seamstress, respectively, who had emigrated from Ireland around 1913. As a child in Winnipeg, Manitoba, she appeared in local vaudeville productions and continued to sing in church during her teenage years. She moved to New York in 1940 to study singing "so she could improve her voice when she performed in church". She spent seven months in 1942 in wartime England searching for her brother and boyfriend, both of whom had been killed. She took voice lessons from Estelle Liebling.

Withers returned to New York to audition for roles on Broadway, shortening her name to Iva Withers. About 1943, she was hired by Rodgers and Hammerstein in the ensemble of Oklahoma!. She later understudied the leading soprano roles in Oklahoma! and Carousel. She recalled, "There was even a Saturday that summer [of 1945] where I played Julie in Carousel at the matinee and Laurey in Oklahoma! in the evening and had to hurry from the Majestic Theatre to the St. James Theatre in between." This feat made Withers the first actress ever to play the lead in two different Broadway hits in one day. She played Laurey during the month of September 1945.

== Broadway leads and later years ==
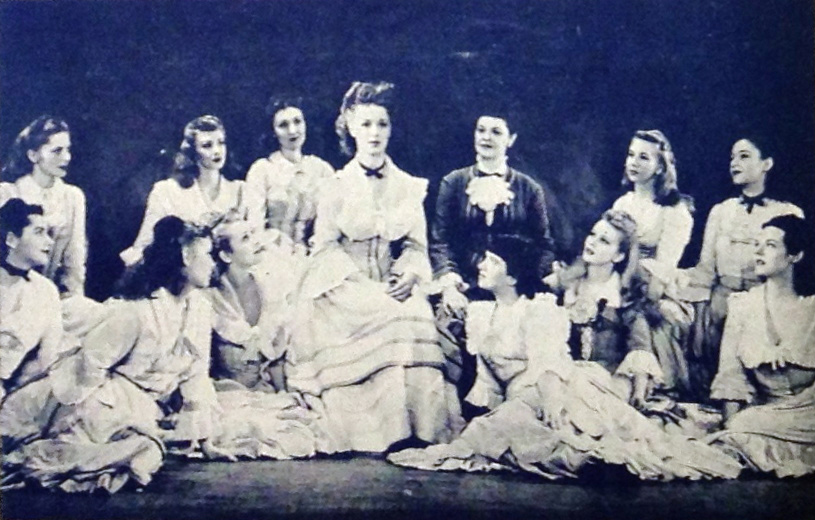
Withers as Julie in Carousel in 1947

Withers replaced Jan Clayton on January 1, 1946, eventually playing Julie Jordan more than 600 times on Broadway, and was the first Julie in the original London production of Carousel in 1950. The English critic Philip Hope-Wallace wrote that she achieved real pathos in the role. She next was a replacement for Adelaide in Guys and Dolls in the original Broadway production. She also played in American national tours as Julie in Carousel, Nellie in South Pacific and Lorelei Lee in Gentlemen Prefer Blondes. Other Broadway roles included Janette in Make a Wish (1951, as standby), May in Redhead (1959, as replacement), Molly in The Unsinkable Molly Brown (1960 as standby), Cyrenne in the stage version of Rattle of a Simple Man (1963, as understudy), Elvira in High Spirits (1964, as standby) and Suzanne and Felice in The Happy Time (1968, as standby).

Her last Broadway role (1968–70) as "Mrs. Adams" in Forty Carats, the only role that she ever created, and also as standby to Julie Harris, and later Zsa Zsa Gabor, in the leading role of Ann Stanley. In August 1970, she went on for a matinee show when Gabor was too upset to perform after having been robbed of $600,000 in jewels at gunpoint that morning. Gabor returned for the evening performance. She left show business after Forty Carats, fed up with fighting the show's producers over the "extra $75″ she was supposed to be paid when actually filling in at a performance.

== Death ==
Iva Withers died in Englewood, New Jersey at age 97 on October 7, 2014, at the Lillian Booth Actors Home.

== Family ==
In 1943 Withers married Robert Strom. While on tour in Carousel in 1946, she met Kazimir Kokich, a former Ballet Russe de Monte Carlo ballet dancer turned Broadway actor-dancer. He was also married at the time. In 1949, both annulled their marriages and married. His first wife was ballerina Alexandra Danilova, who remained friendly with the family after he remarried.

Kokich was an American World War II veteran who increasingly struggled with alcoholism; by the late 1960s, this prevented him from working, and he eventually returned to his native Croatia. After leaving the stage, Withers supported herself and their two children by doing clerical work for physicians, retiring at age 77. Their daughter, Kim Alexandra Kokich, is a reporter with NPR. Their son is Jerry Kokich, a ballet coach and former dancer with the Joffrey Ballet.
