= Blair Ross =

American actress (born 1960)

- Born: April 29, 1960 (age 66); United States
- Education: Vassar College
- Occupation: Actress

Blair Ross (born April 29, 1960) is an American actress.

== Biography ==
Ross grew up in New Jersey. She attended Vassar College where she majored in art history. After college, Ross lived in Nashville for two years before moving to New York City.

== Career ==
She has toured as part of a production of Rodgers and Hammerstein's Cinderella.

She has also guest starred in the television series Law & Order: Special Victims Unit, Crafts & Burn, and Entrepreneur along with voice work in the animated television series Spy Groove and in the 2006 video game Bully from Rockstar Games as the art and photography teacher Ms. Philips.

Ross' performance of Dorothy Brock in 42nd Street was called "a zesty performance" by the Star Tribune. The Boston Herald wrote that Ross played Brock as a "peroxided diva with a throaty belt and a haughty comic style." The Los Angeles Times reported that Ross loved playing the part of Dorothy Brock and said that Ross was "looking every bit the sultry vamp" in the show.

In the performance of 2009's Being Audrey, Variety noticed her in the ensemble cast and wrote that she "does a nifty impersonation of Kay Thompson in Funny Face." The New York Times wrote that Ross was "noxiously nasty" in her role as Auntie in Side Show. The Los Angeles Times wrote that Ross "oozes pure avarice as the stepmother, known only as 'Madame,'" in Cinderella. The Washington Post writes that as 'Madame,' she does "the gargoyle thing very well."

In theatre she has performed in New York City at the Ford Center for the Performing Arts, the Marquis Theatre, and the St James's Theatre in musicals such as 42nd Street, Jekyll & Hyde, and Side Show.

== Filmography ==
=== Theatre ===
Year	Title	Role	Notes
1989	Wonderful Town	Ensemble	
1995	Cowgirls	Waitress	
1997	Paper Moon	Aunt Billie Roy	
1999	Exactly Like You	Ensemble	
2001	42nd Street	Dorothy Brock	Replacing Christine Ebersole
2005	But I'm a Cheerleader (play)	Mary	
2009	Being Audrey	Ensemble	
2013	Jekyll & Hyde	Lady Beaconsfield, Ensemble	
2014	Side Show	Bearded Lady, Auntie, Ensemble	
2015	Cinderella	Madame	
2017	My Fair Lady (Broadway production)	Ensemble, Understudy Dame Diana Rigg	

=== Film ===
Year	Title	Role	Notes
2015	Stranger in the House	Susan Gummersby	
2019	Toss It	Adele	

=== Television ===
Year	Title	Role	Notes
2000	Spy Groove	Windy La Tette	Voice
2010-2024	Law & Order: Special Victims Unit	Principal Carol Huston, Joanna Markham	2 episodes
2012	Craft & Burn	Ben's Mom	1 episode
2015	Entrepreneur	Maureen	
2026	Best Medicine	Agnes Cloofe	episode 10

=== Video games ===
Year	Title	Role	Notes
2006	Bully	Ms. Philips	Voice
