= Shuffle Off to Buffalo =

1933 film by Rudolf Ising

- Title card
- Directed by: Rudolf Ising; Isadore Freleng
- Produced by: Hugh Harman; Rudolf Ising; Leon Schlesinger
- Music by: Frank Marsales
- Animation by: Isadore Freleng; Paul Smith
- Color process: Black-and-white
- Production companies: Harman-Ising Productions; Leon Schlesinger Productions
- Distributed by: Warner Bros. Pictures; The Vitaphone Corporation
- Release date: July 8, 1933
- Running time: 7 min
- Country: United States
- Language: English

Shuffle Off to Buffalo is a 1933 American animated comedy short film directed by Rudolf Ising and Isadore Freleng. It is the 25th film in the Merrie Melodies series, featuring the titular song by Al Dubin and Harry Warren from the film 42nd Street, and the first to be directed by Freleng, who would become a prominent director on the series. The short was released on July 8, 1933.

== Plot ==
Storks transport babies from a factory to their to-be parents. Their owner, an old man, helps manage the services, giving a pair of Inuit twins stored in a refrigerator to a pair of parents who requested twins. He fulfills a request for a baby boy written in Yiddish despite not understanding a word. He then sings the titular song with the Jewish baby, who enters the nursery and sings with the other babies.

In the factory, elves help clean the freshly processed babies with towels and talcum baby powder. They are then strapped into their diapers made with paper towels. A crying baby, labeled as defective by an elf, is quickly drowned for good measure. The babies are then fed high-quality milk before being transported to the nursery. An elf is annoyed by crying babies, who then demand "cantor"; the elf then reveals himself to be literally Eddie Cantor in a costume, who sing the titular song with them. An Asian stereotype girl then continues to sing the titular song, while Cantor and more elves perform on a stage and the babies frolic.

== Home media ==
Shuffle Off to Buffalo is available on disc 3 of the Looney Tunes Golden Collection: Volume 6 DVD set.
