= Wilella Waldorf =

American editor

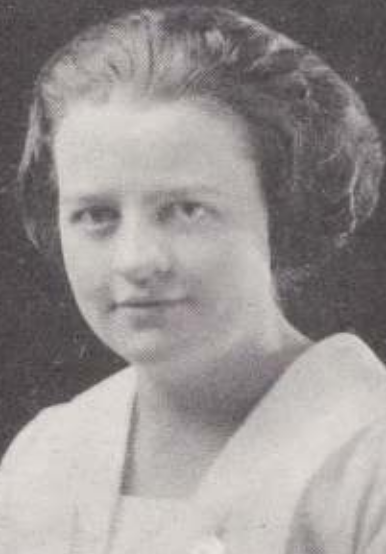
- Wilella Waldorf, from the 1922 Mount Holyoke College yearbook
- Born: November 22, 1899; South Bend, Indiana
- Died: March 12, 1946 (aged 46); New York City
- Occupations: Drama critic, newspaper editor

Wilella Louise Waldorf (November 22, 1899 – March 12, 1946) was an American drama critic and newspaper editor.

== Early life ==
Wilella Louise Waldorf was born and raised in South Bend, Indiana, the daughter of John Maurice Waldorf and Carrie Throckmorton Waldorf. She graduated from high school in 1918, and from Mount Holyoke College in 1922.

== Career ==
As a young woman, Waldorf worked as an investigator for a law firm, a clerk for Western Union, and editor of a historical encyclopedia. She joined the staff of the New York Post in 1925; she was film critic from 1926, drama editor from 1928 to 1946, and drama critic from 1941 to 1946, replacing John Mason Brown. She was one of the first women to hold an editorial position at the Post, and the only woman drama critic at a New York daily newspaper. She was elected to the New York Drama Critics Circle in 1941, and served as the group's treasurer in her last years. Her last review, of a revival of Show Boat, was published in January 1946. Vernon Rice succeeded her at the Post.

Waldorf's negative reviews were characterized by blunt judgment, pronouncing The Time, the Place and the Girl (1942) "an embarrassing bore", and Hairpin Harmony (1943) as "doggedly amateurish". She is sometimes credited with the phrase "We can always call them Bulgarians," in reference to stage characters written or played as gay or lesbian. She quoted film producer Samuel Goldwyn as using the line.

== Personal life ==
She died in 1946, aged 46 years, at her home in New York City, after several months of illness.
