= Jeffry Denman =

American actor

Jeffry Denman is an American actor, director, choreographer and author.

== Early life ==
Denman was born and raised in Buffalo, New York, and graduated from the University at Buffalo as a Musical Theatre Dance major.

== Career ==
He made his Broadway debut in the 1995 revival of How to Succeed in Business Without Really Trying, played Munkustrap in the closing company of Cats and understudied Matthew Broderick in the original cast of The Producers. He was the assistant choreographer and understudy for the role of Noël Coward in the Off-Broadway musical revue If Love Were All in 1999.

At New York City Center Encores! concert series he played Jenkins in Of Thee I Sing (2006) and Pat Mason, Jr. in Face the Music (2007).

In 2004 he originated the role of Phil Davis opposite Brian d'Arcy James, Anastasia Barzee and Meredith Patterson in the World Premiere production of Irving Berlin's White Christmas at the Curran Theatre in San Francisco. In 2008 he starred in the original Broadway production opposite Stephen Bogardus and Meredith Patterson.

He co-starred in Ken Ludwig's musical The Gershwins' An American in Paris at the Alley Theatre, Houston, Texas, in 2008. The Houston Chronicle wrote of him: a "song-and-dance man in the classic tradition, Denman is a natural scene-stealer."

In 2009, he played the Baker in the Wells Fargo Pavilion production of Into the Woods.

In 2010 he choreographed and played the role of Artie in the Off-Broadway premiere of Yank!: a World War II Love Story by Joseph and David Zellnik and was nominated for a 2010 Drama Desk Award for Best Featured Actor in a musical as well as a 2010 Lucille Lortel Award for Best Choreography.

He appeared as Lee Tannen in the world premiere production of I Loved Lucy, a play based on the best selling memoir by Lee Tannen, produced by the Laguna Playhouse in October 2010.

In 2012, he played the Narrator in the Baltimore Center Stage and Westport Country Playhouse production of Into the Woods.

He played the role of Michael in John Kander and Greg Pierce's musical, Kid Victory in both the Signature Theatre world premiere in 2015 as well as the subsequent Off-Broadway Vineyard Theatre production in 2017. He received a 2016 Helen Hayes Award nomination for Outstanding Supporting Actor in a Musical-HAYES Production, and his second Drama Desk Award nomination for his performance.

In 2016 he founded Denman Theatre & Dance Co.

In 2019, Denman played Bruce in a regional production of Fun Home at Baltimore Center Stage.

He is the author of A Year With The Producers:One Actor's Exhausting (But Worth It) Journey from Cats to Mel Brooks' Mega-Hit (Routledge, 2002).

== Personal life ==
Jeffry and Erin Crouch were married in August 2008. Divorced 2017. Jeffry and Sophie Quist were married in September 2022 in Estes Park, Colorado.

== Recordings ==
- Kid Victory (Off Broadway Cast Recording)
- Passion (musical) (CSC Off Broadway recording)
- Face the Music (Encores! Cast Recording)
- Irving Berlin's White Christmas (Studio Cast Recording)
- Stage Door Canteen: Broadway Responds to World War II (92nd Street Y Concert Cast Recording)
- The Producers (Original Broadway Cast)
- How to Succeed in Business Without Really Trying (1995 Revival Cast Recording)
