= Eddie Korbich =

American actor

- Born: November 6, 1960 (age 65); Washington, D.C., U.S.
- Occupations: Actor; singer; dancer
- Years active: 1985–present
- Partner: Andy Leech (1992-present)

Eddie Korbich (born November 6, 1960) is an American actor, singer, and dancer. He was born in Washington, D.C., but grew up in Shamokin, Pennsylvania.

== Career ==
=== 1980s ===
He graduated from the Boston Conservatory with a B.F.A. in acting in 1983. In 1985, he appeared in A Little Night Music at the Equity Library Theatre in New York, New York. In 1987 he was in both the Off-Broadway production of Flora the Red Menace (Vineyard Theatre) and Off-Off-Broadway The No-Frills Revue (Musical Theatre Works)

His first listed show on Broadway was in Singin' in the Rain at the Gershwin Theatre, then in the Sweeney Todd: The Demon Barber of Fleet Street revival in 1989 at the Circle in the Square Theatre, he starred as Tobias Ragg, with Bob Gunton as Sweeney and Beth Fowler as Mrs. Lovett. He starred in Godspell at Lamb's Theatre in 1988.

=== 1990s ===
In the role he is probably most well known for, he starred as assassin Giuseppe Zangara in the 1990 Off-Broadway production of Assassins at the Playwrights Horizons. He also was in the original production of Casino Paradise at the Plays and Players Theatre and the Alley Theatre premiere of Jekyll & Hyde playing Bisset the apothecary.

The Fields of Ambrosia was his next endeavor in the original production at the George Street Playhouse in 1993.

He then starred in the original Off-Broadway Eating Raoul at the Union Square Theatre and played Paul Bland. He starred in the 1994 revival of Carousel at the Vivian Beaumont Theater. He starred as Enoch Snow.

He starred in Redhead at the Goodspeed Opera House in East Haddam, Connecticut as George Poppett.

=== 2000s ===
He was in the original cast of Taking a Chance on Love at the York Theatre in 2000, which he won an Obie Award. He was also in Seussical in 2000 as Ensemble/Grandpa Who. This was after his 12-minute number The Lorax in which he played The Onceler was cut after the Boston tryout.

Then in 2001, he was in the concert version of Bloomer Girl as Ebenezer Mimms/Ensemble put on by Encores!

He was next seen at North Shore Music Theatre in their 2002 production of Dracula: A Chamber Musical, where he starred as R.M. Renfield.

He was then cast in the original production Wicked as a swing and then an understudy for Doctor Dillamond and The Wonderful Wizard of Oz in 2003.

In 2005 he starred in the original play After the Night and the Music at the Manhattan Theatre Club as Keith. Then he was in The Irish Curse at the New York Fringe Festival. Korbich ended 2005 in Los Angeles Premiere production of The Drowsy Chaperone as George.

2006 saw Korbich return Off-Broadway to be in the limited run of The Most Happy Fella at Lincoln Center's State Theatre as the Doctor. Afterwards he went back to the role of George in The Drowsy Chaperone as it opened on broadway, earning him a Drama Desk Award nomination for best-featured actor.

He then appeared in the Face the Music revival in 2007 at the New York City Center.

In 2008 he was the original Scuttle in the musical The Little Mermaid.

=== 2010s ===
In the fall of 2010, Korbich performed at the La Jolla Playhouse in San Diego, California in the world premiere of Limelight: The Story of Charlie Chaplin, a musical detailing the life of Charlie Chaplin. In February 2011 he was Gus/Growltiger and Bustopher Jones in Cats at Musical Theatre West in Long Beach, California.

In 2012, Korbich appeared in the original Broadway cast of A Christmas Story, appearing as Santa Claus and the Doctor.

In 2013, Korbich was in the Emilia Clarke-led Broadway production of Breakfast at Tiffany's. Later that year, Korbich was in the original cast of A Gentleman's Guide to Love and Murder.

== Personal life ==
Eddie Korbich met Andy Leech in 1992 and have been partners since, having even been on stage together in shows like I Do! I Do! at 54 Below in 2016.

== Filmography ==
Film/TV
Year	Film/TV	Role	Notes
1991-1999	Doug	Al and Moo Sleech	Voice; Regular characters, 1991–1994, 1996–1999
1992	Law & Order	O'Malley	Episode "The Fertile Field"
1992	Flodders in Amerika!	Hot Dog Salesman	
1992	Jennifer Eight	Myopic Janitor	
1994	Quiz Show	Lighting Director	
1995	New York Undercover	Antoine	Episode "You Get No Respect"
1996	The Hunchback of Notre Dame	Frollo's Soldiers	Voice
1998-2000	PB&J Otter	Flick Duck, Edouard Snooty, Ootsie & Bootsie Snooty	Voice; Regular characters
1999	Doug's 1st Movie	Al Sleech / Moo Sleech / RoboCrusher	Voice
1999	Tarzan	Peter	Voice
2000	Mary and Rhoda	Photographer	
2000	Wonderland	Ronald Pulitz	Episode "Pilot"
2002	Benjamin Franklin	Jared Ruggles	
2003	Law & Order: Special Victims Unit	Nick Petracho	Episode "Control"
2009	Nurse Jackie	Tap Instructor	Episodes "Pill-O-Matix" and "Ring Finger"
2016	Love on the Run	Karl	
2016	Blue Bloods	Nicholas Salamone	Episode: "The Greater Good"

== Stage ==
Theater
Year	Show	Role	Production/Cast	Notes
1985	A Little Night Music	Performer	Off-Broadway; Revival	Specific role unknown.
1987	The No-Frills Revue	Performer	Off-Off-Broadway; Original	Specific role unknown.
1987	Flora the Red Menace	Performer	Off-Broadway; Revival	Specific role unknown.
1989	Godspell	Performer	Off-Broadway; Revival	Specific role unknown.
1989	Sweeney Todd	Tobias Ragg	Off-Broadway; Revival	
1989	Sweeney Todd	Tobias Ragg	Broadway Transfer	
1990	Casino Paradise	Performer	Regional (US); Premiere	Specific role unknown.
1990	Assassins	Guiseppe Zangara	Off-Broadway; Original	
1990	Jekyll & Hyde	Bisset the Apothecary	Regional (US); Premiere	
1992	Eating Raoul	Paul Bland	Off-Broadway; Original	
1993	The Fields of Ambrosia	The Mortician	Regional (US); Premiere	
1993	42nd Street	Bert Barry	National Tour	
1994	Carousel	Enoch Snow	Broadway; Revival	
1996	Show Boat	Frank	National Tour	
1998	Redhead	George Poppett	Regional (US); Revival	Performed at Goodspeed Musicals
2000	Taking a Chance on Love	Performer	Off-Broadway; Original	Specific role unknown.
2000	Seussical	Grandpa Who	Broadway; Original	
2001	Bloomer Girl	Ebenezer Mimms	Off-Broadway; Encores	
2002	Dracula: A Chamber Musical	R.M. Renfield	Regional (US); Original	
2003	Wicked	Swing u/s Doctor Dillamond / u/s The Wonderful Wizard of Oz	Broadway; Original	Covered at least 11 roles, including Dr. Dillamond and the Wizard, though the rest are unknown.
2005	After the Night and the Music	Keith	Broadway; Original	
2005	The Irish Curse	Joseph Flaherty	NY Fringe; Premiere	
2005	The Drowsy Chaperone	George	Regional (US); Premiere	Performed in Los Angeles
2006	The Most Happy Fella	Doctor	Off-Broadway; Revival	
2006	The Drowsy Chaperone	George	Broadway; Original	
2007	Face the Music	Joe Malarky	Off-Broadway; Encores	
2008	The Little Mermaid	Scuttle	Broadway; Original	
2010	Chaplin*	Karno	Regional (US); Original	Performed at the La Jolla Playhouse *Originally titled Limelight: Story of Charlie Chaplin
2011	Cats	Gus / Growltiger / Bustopher Jones	Regional (US); Revival	
2012	A Christmas Story: The Musical	Doctor / Santa Claus, u/s The Old Man	Broadway; Original	
2013	Breakfast at Tiffany's	Dr. Goldman	Broadway; Original	
2013	A Gentleman's Guide to Love and Murder	Magistrate / Mr. Gorby	Broadway; Original	
2016	God Bless You, Mr. Rosewater	Performer	Off-Broadway; Encores	Specific role unknown.
2017	The New Yorkers	Performer	Off-Broadway; Encores	Specific role unknown.
2018	My Parsifal Conductor	Wagner	Off-Broadway; Premiere	
2022	The Music Man	Jacey Squires / Conductor	Broadway; Revival	
2024	Drag: The Musical	Drunk Jerry	Off-Broadway; Original	

== Discography ==
Recordings
Year	Production
1987	Flora the Red Menace
1990	Girl Crazy
1990	Casino Paradise
1991	Assassins
1992	Eating Raoul
1993	The Fields of Ambrosia
1993	The Gift of the Magi
2000	Taking a Chance on Love
2006	The Drowsy Chaperone
2008	The Little Mermaid
2013	A Gentleman's Guide to Love and Murder
2022	The Music Man
