= Paul Blake (theatre) =

American theatre producer, writer, and director

Paul Blake (born 1941) is an American theatre producer, writer and director. He served as lead producer of Beautiful: The Carole King Musical alongside co-producers Sony/ATV and Mike Bosner, which premiered on Broadway in 2014 garnering seven Tony Award Nominations including Best Musical and winning in 2 categories (Best Lead Actress in a Musical and Best Sound Design of a Musical). At the time of its final performance (October 27, 2019) it was the 27th longest-running show in the history of Broadway.

Blake also co-wrote and co-produced the musical Irving Berlin’s White Christmas which was produced on Broadway. Blake also served as lead producer for the 2017 Broadway revival of Andrew Lloyd Weber's Sunset Boulevard starring Glenn Close at the Palace Theatre.

For 22 years he was the executive producer of the St. Louis MUNY, the largest and oldest outdoor theatre in America.

== Early life ==
Blake grew up in the Bronx, NY and graduated from the High School of Music & Art in 1958 and the City College of New York in 1962. At City College, he was voted President of his class and delivered a commencement address to his graduating classmates at Lewishon Stadium.

== Early career ==
Blake began his professional career as an actor, making his debut in 1963 in the Off-Broadway revue, Tour De Four.

After a series of disappointing Off-Broadway outings as a performer, he began directing, soon landing at San Francisco's American Conservatory Theater (ACT), then under the leadership of its founder Bill Ball. Blake spent five years, from 1972 to 1977, at ACT, serving as head of its acting program while simultaneously directing shows both on its main stage and in its black-box theatre, including the first professional production by Tony Award-winning playwright Mark Medoff, and a production of Noël Coward's Tonight at 8.30.

In 1978, Blake moved to Los Angeles, where he produced and directed a string of successful star-driven stage productions, including Shaun Cassidy and Julia Duffy in Barefoot in the Park, Connie Stevens in Vanities, John Travolta and Charles Durning in Mass Appeal, Donna McKechnie in Annie Get Your Gun, Shirley Jones in The King and I and for five years his production of Words and Music starring songwriter Sammy Cahn toured the U.S. and England.

In 1984, Blake was asked to be the executive producer and artistic director of the Lobero Theatre in Santa Barbara, California, where he ran the Santa Barbara Theatre Festival. Among the stars Blake worked with during his five-year tenure in Santa Barbara were Valerie Bertinelle, Cheryl Ladd, Julie Harris, and Peggy Lee. His production of She Loves Me, starring Joel Higgins, Pam Dawber and Theodore Bikel, opened to rave reviews in 1987 and moved to the Ahmanson Theatre in Los Angeles, where it earned another round of raves

For ACT in San Francisco he wrote an adaptation of Mae West's Diamond ‘Lil, which won 7 awards including Best Play Production from the San Francisco Theatre Critics.

== The MUNY ==
In 1990, Blake was invited to take over the famous but struggling St. Louis MUNY as its executive producer. Blake turned around the landmark theatre, which was then in its eighth decade of operations. For the next 22 years under Blake’s leadership, the theatre enjoyed what the St. Louis Post-Dispatch called the MUNY’s "2nd Golden Age". Among the productions that played the MUNY during Blake’s tenure were Bye, Bye Birdie starring Tommy Tune and Ann Reinking, George M! starring Joel Grey, The Wizard of Oz and Cinderella with Phyllis Diller, South Pacific and My Fair Lady starring Howard Keel, No No Nanette! starring Van Johnson and Marge Champion, Annie starring Rue McClanahan, and an original revue that starred the Radio City Rockettes.

During his 22 seasons at the MUNY, Blake wrote the books for a version of Sleeping Beauty with songs by Jerome Kern, White Christmas with songs by Irving Berlin and Roman Holiday with songs by Cole Porter.

== Beautiful: The Carole King Musical ==
In 2010, the President of EMI Music Publishing, Roger Faxon, asked Blake to create a show out of the Carole King song catalogue. Blake assembled a creative team that included book writer Douglas McGrath, director Marc Bruni, and choreographer Josh Prince to create what would become Beautiful: The Carole King Musical. Beautiful premiered at the Curran Theatre in San Francisco in October 2013, and moved to Broadway where it opened at the Stephen Sondheim Theatre in January 2014. It was a massive success on Broadway, garnering seven Tony Award nominations including Best Musical and winning in two categories (Best Lead Actress in a Musical (Jessie Mueller) and Best Sound Design of a Musical (Brian Ronan). At the time of its final performance (October 27, 2019) it was the 27th longest-running show in the history of Broadway. Beautiful's success on Broadway has spurred a range of additional productions, including in London's West End, two U.S. Tours, a U.K. Tour and an Australian Tour. A film version is also in the works.

== Sunset Boulevard ==
Blake followed up Beautiful with the first Broadway revival of Andrew Lloyd Webber’s Sunset Boulevard, directed by Lonny Price, with Glenn Close reprising her Tony Award-winning performance as Norma Desmond. Sunset Boulevard opened at the Palace Theatre on February 9, 2017.
