= Face the Music (musical) =

- 1932 Playbill cover
- Music: Irving Berlin
- Lyrics: Irving Berlin
- Book: Moss Hart
- Productions: 1932 Broadway; 1933 Broadway

Face the Music is a musical, the first collaboration between Moss Hart (book) and Irving Berlin (music and lyrics). Face the Music opened on Broadway in 1932, and has had several subsequent regional and New York stagings. The popular song "Let's Have Another Cup of Coffee" was introduced in the musical by J. Harold Murray.

== History ==
The musical was written as a political satire, specifically spoofing political and police corruption that the Seabury Commission was investigating. It also satirized show business, showing the far-fetched economies, such as seeing 4 films with a room and bath for 10¢. The musical did not ignore the Depression but rather found humor in it. There were many titles considered, among them Nickels and Dimes, but Berlin came up with the final title.

== Synopsis ==
Producer Hal Reisman desperately seeks backers for his Broadway show. Because of the Great Depression, once-rich investors are "Lunching at the Automat". Kit Baker, a former musical-comedy star and her boyfriend Pat Mason are now out of work and poor ("Let's Have Another Cup of Coffee"). In his search, Reisman meets crooked policemen who need to get rid of their illegal money before they are found out. The corrupt police chief Martin van Buren Meshbesher and his eccentric wife Myrtle become investors in the show, expecting it to be a failure. In the show-within-the-show, Rodney St. Clair sings "My Beautiful Rhinestone Girl". However, when risqué material is added the show is raided and the government tries to close it. The flop becomes a hit because of the publicity.

== Musical numbers ==
=== Original Broadway (1932) ===
==== Act I ====
- Lunching at the Automat – Ensemble
- Let's Have Another Cup of Coffee – Pat Mason, Jr. and Kit Baker
- Torch Song – Streetwalker
- You Must Be Born with It – Pickles and Joe
- On a Roof in Manhattan – Pat Mason, Jr. and Kit Baker
- My Beautiful Rhinestone Girl – Rodney St. Clair
- Soft Lights and Sweet Music – Pat Mason, Jr. and Kit Baker

==== Act II ====
- Act II Opening – Ensemble
- I Say It's Spinach (And the Hell with It) – Pat Mason, Jr. and Kit Baker
- A Toast to Prohibition (Drinking Song) – Rodney St. Clair and Boys
- Dear Old Crinoline Days – Kit Baker
- I Don't Want to Be Married – Pickles and Joe
- Manhattan Madness – Pat Mason, Jr.
- Investigation – Company

=== Restored Score, Encores! (2007) ===
==== Act I ====
- "Lunching at the Automat" – Ensemble
- "Let's Have Another Cup of Coffee" – Pat Mason, Jr. and Kit Baker
- "Two Cheers Instead of Three" – Uncle Sam and Ensemble*
- "The Police of New York" – Martin Van Buren Meshbesher, Officer O'Rourke, and Policemen*
- "Reisman's Doing a Show" – Company^
- "Torch Song" – Streetwalker
- "You Must Be Born With It" – Pickles and Joe
- "On a Roof in Manhattan" – Pat Mason, Jr. and Kit Baker
- "Crinoline Days" – Kit Baker
- "My Beautiful Rhinestone Girl" – Rodney St. Clair
- "Soft Lights and Sweet Music" – Pat Mason, Jr. and Kit Baker
- "If You Believe" – Myrtle Meshbesher and Ensemble*

==== Act II ====
- "Well, Of All The Rotten Shows" – Ensemble
- "I Say It's Spinach (And The Hell With It)" – Pat Mason, Jr. and Kit Baker
- "How Can I Change My Luck?" – Hal Reisman*
- "A Toast to Prohibition (Drinking Song)" – Martin Van Buren Meshbesher, Rodney St. Clair, Myrtle Mesbesher, and Ensemble
- "The Nudist Colony (Crinoline Days [Reprise]) – Kit Baker^
- "I Don't Wanna Be Married (I Just Wanna Be Friends" – Pickles and Joe
- "Manhattan Madness" – Pat Mason, Jr.
- "Investigation" – Company

*Added during touring versions of the show, following the original Broadway production

^Performed in the original production but not listed in the Playbill

== Cast ==
	Original Broadway Cast (1932)	Broadway Revival (1933)	Encores! Production (2007)
Hal Reisman	Andrew Tombes	Robert Emmett Keane	Walter Bobbie
Pat Mason, Jr.	J. Harold Murray	John Barker	Jeffry Denman
Kit Baker	Katherine Carrington	Nancy McCord	Meredith Patterson
Martin Van Buren Meshbesher	Hugh O'Connell	Charles Lawrence	Lee Wilkof
Mrs. Myrtle Meshbesher	Mary Boland		Judy Kaye
Joe Malarkey	Jack Good		Eddie Korbich
Pickles Crouse	Margaret Lee		Mylinda Hull
Officer O'Rourke	Edward Gargan	George Anderson	Timothy Shew
Rodney St. Clair	Joseph Macauley	John W. Ehrle	Chris Hoch
Streetwalker	Jean Sargent		Felicia Finley

== Productions ==
Face the Music opened in Philadelphia on February 3, 1932, for 2 weeks in its pre-Broadway tryout.

The musical premiered on Broadway at the New Amsterdam Theatre on February 17, 1932, and closed on July 9, 1932, after 165 performances. Staging was by Hassard Short, direction by George S. Kaufman and choreography by Albertina Rasch. It had a return engagement from January 31, 1933, to February 25, 1933, for 31 performances at the 44th Street Theatre (demolished in 1945). The cast featured Mary Boland (Mrs. Meshbesher), J. Harold Murray (Pat Mason, Jr.), Margot Adams (Miss Eisenheimer), Charles Lawrence (Martin van Buren Meshbesher), Robert Emmett Keane (Hal Reisman), Katherine Carrington (Kit Baker), Thomas Arace (Detective), and The Albertina Rasch Dancers.

The 42nd St. Moon (San Francisco) production ran from March 26 - April 13, 1997.

The Musicals Tonight! (New York City) production ran in June 2002.

Encores! (New York City) presented a staged concert from March 29 to April 1, 2007. Directed by John Rando with choreography by Randy Skinner, the cast featured Judy Kaye (Mrs. Myrtle Meshbesher), Lee Wilkof (Martin van Buren Meshbesher), Walter Bobbie (Hal Reisman), Eddie Korbich as (Joe Malarky), Jeffry Denman (Pat Mason), and Meredith Patterson (Kit Baker).

'Face the Music' was scheduled for a UK Professional Stage Premiere at the Rose and Crown Theatre from 9 June to 3 July 2015. Directed by Brendan Matthew, choreography by Sally Brooks and musical direction by Aaron Clingham.

== Response ==
Brooks Atkinson, reviewing the original 1932 production for The New York Times, called the musical a "bountiful merry-go-round" of songs and "gibes", writing that it is "bold satire", but has familiar musical comedy numbers, such as the "stunning mirror dance... expressionistic Times Square ballet...and "Dear Old Crinoline Days which is guffawing burlesque."

An unnamed reviewer, quoted in the Brown biography Moss Hart, wrote "It's a worthy successor to Of Thee I Sing [but] it doesn't entirely measure up to it. It resorts to slapstick instead of satire. It becomes merely burlesque. All of which doesn't mean that Face the Music isn't a howl. It most emphatically is."

The reviewer for "theatermania.com", in reviewing the "Musicals Tonight!" 2002 production, noted that "1932 audiences didn’t go to musicals for ingenious satire; they wanted sumptuous productions, brilliant choreography, delightful performers, and great songs." The score "boasts two classics ("Soft Lights and Sweet Music" and "Let’s Have Another Cup of Coffee") and much more that's lilting, clever, or otherwise intriguing. One real discovery is "Torch Song," a wicked send-up of Helen Morgan weepers..."Investigation," a 12-minute opera-comique finale that reprises and restates old themes, introduces new ones, wraps up the plot, and brings in a Threepenny Opera-style deus ex machina to usher in the happy ending.

According to the Curtain Up reviewer, commenting on the 2007 Encores! concert, this musical had an "influence on backstage musicals like The Producers, The Drowsy Chaperone and Curtains."
