= Walter Bobbie =

American theatre director and choreographer

- Born: November 18, 1945 (age 80); Scranton, Pennsylvania
- Occupations: Stage, film, television actor, dancer
- Awards: Tony Award for Best Direction of a Musical, 1997 Chicago; Drama Desk Award for Outstanding Director of a Play, 1997 Chicago

Walter Bobbie Jr. (born November 18, 1945) is an American theatre director, choreographer, and occasional actor and dancer. Bobbie has directed both musicals and plays on Broadway and Off-Broadway, and was the Artistic Director of the New York City Center Encores! concert series. He directed the long-running Broadway revival of the musical Chicago. His most well-known acting roles were Nicely-Nicely Johnson in the 1992 Broadway revival of Guys and Dolls and Roger in the original Broadway cast of Grease.

== Early life ==
Bobbie was born in Scranton, Pennsylvania. Raised in Lincoln Park, New Jersey, he graduated from Boonton High School in 1963. and attended the University of Scranton and did graduate work at The Catholic University of America. His family was Polish Roman Catholic, and his father was a coal miner. He spoke fluent Polish.

Bobbie explains what inspired him to work in theater: "My first Broadway show was How to Succeed in Business Without Really Trying, maybe in 1964. I came in to New York from college in Pennsylvania for the World's Fair...I remember sitting there — I practically had to be held down in my seat — and I had never seen anything like it. That day it was clear to me that I wanted to come back to New York, and theater was what I wanted to do. It was transforming."

== Career ==
=== Performer ===
As a performer, Bobbie played Roger in the original Broadway production of Grease in 1972. He was featured in the 1976 Broadway revival of Going Up and played Lord Oakleigh in the 1987 revival of Anything Goes. He also starred on Broadway as Nicely-Nicely Johnson in the 1992 revival of Guys and Dolls, for which he received a Drama Desk Award nomination for Outstanding Featured Actor in a Musical. He also was in the Off-Broadway productions of Company as Harry in 1980 and Assassins in 1989. Bobbie was in the 1995 concert production of Anyone Can Whistle at Carnegie Hall portraying Comptroller Schub. He most recently appeared on Broadway in 2018 in Saint Joan as Peter Cauchon/Bishop of Beauvais.

=== Director ===
Bobbie directed the Rodgers and Hammerstein revue A Grand Night for Singing at Rainbow & Stars in 1992 and at the Roundabout Theatre in 1993 for which he received a Tony Award nomination for Best Book of a Musical, the only Broadway revue in history to be nominated for Best Book of a Musical since revues are generally not eligible for awards that require a narrative framework. The nomination for Best Book of a Musical was in recognition of the sequence of the songs since the show has no script and no spoken words. The show was also nominated for the Drama Desk Award for Outstanding Revue. The New York Times called the Rainbow & Stars production a "radiant new revue" and a "musical masterstroke" and reported of Bobbie's direction that he "has given its Broadway elaboration an impressive fluidity that whisks the performers through various groupings with a minimum of stiffness and posturing. In Mr. Bobbie's hands, the songs flow together in a sequence that treats them as lighthearted extensions of one another."

In 1996, he directed a revival of Chicago for Encores! The production transferred to Broadway later that year, and Bobbie won the Tony Award for Best Direction of a Musical. The staging has gone on to become the longest-running American musical in Broadway history.

Bobbie next directed the Broadway productions of the stage musical Footloose in 1998, and co-wrote the book. He co-wrote and directed The Road to Hollywood, a new musical performed at the Goodspeed Opera House in 2002.

Bobbie directed the 2004 Roundabout Theater production of Twentieth Century with Alec Baldwin and Anne Heche, as well as the 2005 Sweet Charity revival with Christina Applegate, and then High Fidelity in 2006. Bobbie also directed the one-night-only 2005 concert of South Pacific, a benefit for Carnegie Hall, starring Reba McEntire and Brian Stokes Mitchell.

The musical White Christmas which he directed had limited engagements on Broadway in November 2008 through January 2009 and again in November 2009 through January 2010. Bobbie received a 2009 Drama Desk Award nomination for Outstanding Director of a Musical.

Bobbie directed the New York premiere of The Savannah Disputations by Evan Smith at the Off-Broadway Playwrights Horizons in 2009, with Marylouise Burke, Dana Ivey, Kellie Overby and Reed Birney. In regional theatre, he directed the new Terrence McNally play Golden Age at the Kennedy Center in 2010.

=== Artistic director ===
Bobbie was artistic director of the New York City Center Encores! concert series in 1995 and 1996, and also directed the staged concerts of Fiorello! (1994), Tenderloin (2000), and Golden Boy (2002). For Du Barry Was a Lady (1996) he co-adapted the book. He directed the 2008 production of No, No, Nanette. He appeared in Face the Music in 2007 with The New York Times reviewer writing: "A last, affectionate word for Mr. Bobbie, whose career took off in another direction when his staging of Chicago for the Encores! series became a Broadway smash. As the harried Hal Reisman...he breathes fresh comic life into even some of the hoariest routines."

== Filmography ==
Walter Bobbie film and television credits
Year	Title	Role	Notes
1981, 2004	One Life to Live	Reporter / William Davis Dawes	2 episodes
1986	Hill Street Blues	Councilman Wade	2 episodes
1986	The Equalizer	Cox	Episode: "Unpunished Crimes"
1987	L.A. Law	Joel Zweibel	Episode: "Becker on the Rox"
1987	The Equalizer	Virgil	Episode: "Shadow Play"
1988	Shakedown	Dean Howland	Film
1990–1991	Loving	Wally Anderson	5 episodes
1991	ABC Afterschool Specials	Sheriff	Episode: "It's Only Rock & Roll"
1991	Law & Order	Peter Cummins	Episode: "His Hour Upon the Stage"
1992	Law & Order	Fred Drake	Episode: "Wedded Bliss"
1994	NYPD Blue	Manfredi	Episode: "Up on the Roof"
1995	Guiding Light	Mal Davies	Episode #1.11861
1995	New York News		Episode: "New York News"
1996	Edie & Pen	Speeding Cabbie	Film
1996	The First Wives Club	Man in Bed	Film
1996	Thinner	Kirk Penschley	Film
1999	Law & Order	Michael Garrison	Episode: "Merger"
2000	Between the Lions		Episode: "Sausage Nose"
2003	Marci X	Walt Seldon	Film
2004	Palindromes	Bo Sunshine	Film
2013	The Good Wife	Seth DeLuca	Episode: "Runnin' with the Devil"
2021	Dopesick	Mortimer Sackler	5 episodes
