= Lee Wilkof =

American actor, director, writer

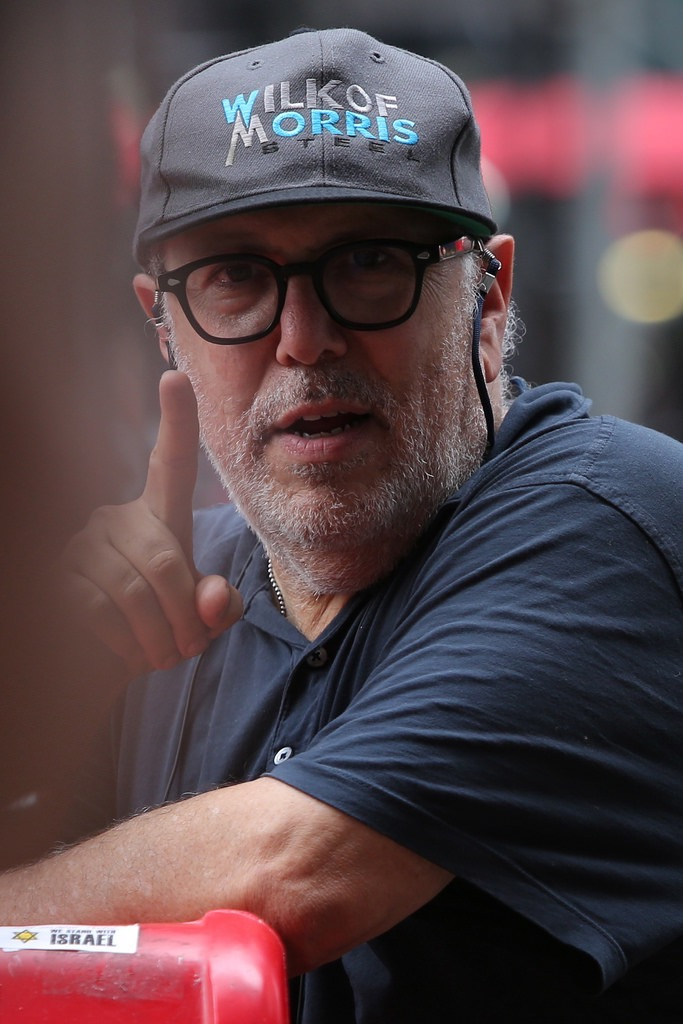
- Lee Wilkof
- Born: June 25, 1951 (age 74); Canton, Ohio, U.S.
- Occupation: Actor/Director/Writer
- Years active: 1978-present
- Spouse(s): Connie Grappo (1984-present; 1 child)

Lee Wilkof (born June 25, 1951) is an American character actor who has been appearing on stage, film and television for 6 decades.

== Early life ==
Wilkof is from Canton, Ohio. He is the middle child of Anne Louise and Darwin Wilkof. He has two brothers, Todd and Robert. Wilkof is Jewish. He graduated from the University of Cincinnati in 1972 and studied acting with Austin Pendleton in New York City.

== Career ==
After graduating college, Wilkof co-wrote and performed in a comedy revue, The Present Tense, in 1977 at the Park Royal Theatre in New York City. Shortly after its closing, Wilkof moved to Los Angeles and landed small film and television roles. His big break came in 1982 with the leading role as Seymour in the original Off-Broadway production of Little Shop of Horrors.

Wilkof directed the film No Pay, Nudity with a cast that stars Nathan Lane, Gabriel Byrne, and Frances Conroy. In 2023 he made his Metropolitan Opera debut in Terence Blanchard's Champion, as The Announcer. He starred in the short film Dig Deeper alongside Victor Williams written and directed by Girault Seger, which premiered at the Newport Beach Film Festival, followed by screenings at the Soho International Film Festival, Tennessee Indie Independent Film Festival, and the New York Indie Shorts Awards. He wrote, directed, and appears in the short film Teenage Waistband which was shot in October 2024. Wilkof plays the banjo and sings in the musical quartet Twenty Mule Team Weiner Train. He is the winner of the New Yorker Cartoon Caption Contest # 217.

== Personal life ==
Wilkof lives in Gardiner, New York with his wife, painter Connie Grappo. They have a daughter.

== Theater ==
=== Broadway ===
- Sweet Charity Revival, as Herman, 1986
- The Front Page Revival, as Schwartz, 1986–1987
- She Loves Me Revival, as Ladislav Sipos, 1993–1994
- Kiss Me, Kate Revival, as First Man (singing Brush Up Your Shakespeare), 1999-2001
- The Boys from Syracuse Revival, as Dromio of Syracuse, 2002
- Democracy, as Gunther Nollau, 2004–2005
- The Odd Couple Revival, as Vinnie, 2005–2006
- Breakfast at Tiffany's, as OJ Berman, 2013
- Holiday Inn, as Danny, 2016
- Waitress, as Joe, 2018

=== Off-Broadway, Regional and Tour ===
- The Present Tense, 1977
- Little Shop of Horrors, as Seymour, 1982
- Angry Housewives, as Lewd, 1986
- Assassins, as Samuel Byck, 1990
- Do Re Mi, (Encores! Concert), as Fatso O'Rear, 1999
- Little Shop of Horrors, Broadway Florida tryout, as Mr. Mushnik, 2003
- Ballad of Little Pinks at the New York Musical Theatre Festival, 2003
- Face The Music, Encores! Concert, as Martin Van Meshbesher, 2007
- Wicked First National Tour, as The Wizard (2007–2008)
- Wicked San Francisco production, as The Wizard (2009–2010)
- The Iceman Cometh The Goodman Theatre, as Hugo Kalmar 2012
- Guys and Dolls Carnegie Hall, as Harry the Horse (2014)
- The Iceman Cometh Brooklyn Academy of Music, as Hugo Kalmar 2015
- Little Shop of Horrors, Kennedy Center, as Mr. Mushnik, 2018

== Select filmography ==
- Serial (1980)
- Wholly Moses! (1980)
- The Entity (1981)
- Perry Mason: The Case of the Shooting Star (1986)
- Kill Me Again (1989)
- Chattahoochee (1989)
- This Boy's Life (1993) - Principal Shippy
- The Associate (1996)
- Private Parts (1997)
- The Grey Zone (2001)
- School of Rock (2003)
- Imaginary Heroes (2004)
- Mojave Phone Booth (2006)
- Before the Devil Knows You're Dead (2007)
- Love Comes Lately (2007)
- Leaves of Grass (2009) - Professor Levy
- YellowBrickRoad (2010)
- Anesthesia (2015) - Ray

== Selected television ==
- Disco Beaver from Outer Space (1978)
- W.E.B. as Harvey Pearlstein (1978)
- Delta House as Einswine (1979)
- Hart to Hart as Stanley Friesen (1979-1982)
- Matlock Episode: "The Reporter" as Dr. Randolph (1987)
- Max Headroom as Edwards (1987–88)
- 100 Centre Street as Alexander Weiss (2001)
- Ally McBeal as District Attorney Nixon (1998–2002)
- Law & Order franchise as various characters (1991–2019)

== Awards and nominations ==
- Obie Award for The Present Tense

Drama Desk Award nomination for The Present Tense

- Drama Desk nomination for Assassins
- Tony nomination for Kiss Me, Kate
- Drama Desk nomination for Kiss Me, Kate

Grammy Award for Best Opera Recording for "Champion"
