= Eating Raoul (musical) =

Eating Raoul is a musical with music by Jed Feuer, lyrics by Boyd Graham, and a book by Paul Bartel and Richard Blackburn. It is based on the 1982 movie of the same name.

The story focuses on Mary and Paul Bland, a couple of "squares", in the late 1960s, who want to raise money to open a restaurant. They decide to kill swingers for profit by hitting them on the head with a frying pan. They become involved with a partner, Raoul, their swarthy, sexy janitor, who helps them to dispose of the bodies. However, they soon feel trapped by Raoul and dispatch him too; he becomes the main course.

The musical opened Off-Broadway at the Union Square Theatre on May 13, 1992, starring Courtenay Collins, Eddie Korbich and Adrian Zmed. It was directed by Toni Kotite and choreographed by Lynne Taylor-Corbett. Since then it has received numerous regional productions.

== Roles and original cast ==
- Paul Bland – Eddie Korbich
- Mary Bland – Courtenay Collins
- Raoul Mendoza – Adrian Zmed
- Dr. Doberman; Ginger – M. W. Reid
- Inez; Cop – Lovette George
- Donna the Dominatrix; Yolanda – Cindy Benson
- Mr. Leech; Howard; Bobby – David Masenheimer
- Mr. Kray; James; Junior – Jonathan Brody
- Gladys – Susan Wood

== Musical numbers ==
- Meet the Blands
- A Small Restaurant
- La La Land
- Swing, Swing, Swing
- Happy Birthday Harry
- You Gotta Take Pains
- A Thought Occurs
- Victim Update
- Sexperts
- Basketball
- Empty Bed
- Tool For You
- Think About Tomorrow
- Eating Raoul
- Momma Said
- Lovers In Love
- Mary
- Hot Monkey Love
- One Last Bop
- Finale
