= The Traveling Executioner =

1970 film

- Theatrical release poster
- Directed by: Jack Smight
- Written by: Garrie Bateson
- Produced by: Jack Smight
- Starring: Stacy Keach; Bud Cort; Stefan Gierasch; Marianna Hill
- Cinematography: Philip H. Lathrop
- Edited by: Neil Travis
- Music by: Jerry Goldsmith
- Production company: Metro-Goldwyn-Mayer
- Distributed by: Metro-Goldwyn-Mayer
- Release date: October 1, 1970
- Running time: 95 minutes
- Country: United States
- Language: English

The Traveling Executioner is a 1970 American comedy-drama Western film directed by Jack Smight and starring Stacy Keach, Bud Cort, Stefan Gierasch and Marianna Hill.

The musical The Fields of Ambrosia is based on the film.

== Plot ==
Jonas Candide, a former carnival showman, travels around the South in 1918 with his own portable electric chair, going from prison to prison with his young assistant, Jimmy, charging one hundred dollars per execution. Two of Jonas' potential victims are siblings Willy and Gundred Herzallerliebst. While Jonas successfully executes Willy, he falls for Gundred, hoping to fake her execution. He does, but then things turn dark for him.

== Cast ==
- Stacy Keach as Jonas Candide
- Marianna Hill as Gundred Herzallerliebst
- Bud Cort as Jimmy
- Graham Jarvis as Doc Prittle
- James Sloyan as Piquant
- M. Emmet Walsh as Warden Brodski
- John Bottoms as Lawyer
- Ford Rainey as Stanley Mae
- James Greene as Gravey Combs
- Sam Reese as Priest
- Stefan Gierasch as Willy Herzallerliebst
- Logan Ramsey as La Follette
- Charles Tyner as Virgil
- William Mims as Lynn
- Val Avery as Jake
- Walt Barnes as Sheriff
- Charlie Briggs as Zak
- Paul Gauntt as Jeremy
- Claire Brennen as Woman Passerby (uncredited)
- Martine Fraser as 2nd Child (uncredited)
- Tony Fraser as 1st Child (uncredited)
- Katherine MacGregor as Alice Thorn (uncredited)
- Pat Patterson as Roscoe (uncredited)
- Lorna Thayer as Madam (uncredited)

=== Notes ===
Dyan Cannon was originally announced for the female lead.

== Filming Locations ==
The movie was filmed mainly in Montgomery, Alabama, at the old Kilby Prison location at the NE corner of Federal Drive & Coliseum Boulevard behind the railroad tracks. Part of Federal Drive was renamed Congressman Dickinson Drive for U.S. Representative William L. Dickinson of Alabama in 1988 starting at that intersection eastward, so the old prison fronted what is now the renamed portion. The prison was shut down in 1970 right before filming began. The Kilby Correctional Facility on Wares Ferry Road in east Montgomery is a newer & different type of lower-security prison facility that took on the name after the old prison shut down and used mainly to process new inmates and as a medical center for inmates.

== Reception ==
Variety wrote, "A macabre, tastefully seamy comedy-drama about bayou prison life, circa 1918."

== See also ==
- List of American films of 1970
- New Hollywood
