= Yank! =

Yank! A WWII Love Story
- Poster for the 2010 York Theater Company production
- Music: Joseph Zellnik
- Lyrics: David Zellnik
- Book: David Zellnik
- Productions: 2005 New York Musical Theatre Festival 2007 Brooklyn; 2008 San Diego; 2010 Off-Broadway; 2017 Manchester; 2017 Rio de Janeiro 2017 London

Yank! A WWII Love Story is a 2005 musical with book and lyrics by David Zellnik and music by his brother Joseph. Yank! "tells the story of Stu, a scared Midwestern kid who gets drafted for World War II in 1943, and becomes a photographer for Yank Magazine, the journal 'for and by the servicemen.' Yank! has a score that pays homage to the 1940s and explores what it means to be a man, and what it is to fall in love and struggle." Yank! takes its title from the World War II publication Yank, the Army Weekly.

== Production history ==
According to the Brooklyn Paper, "...“Yank” was a real publication. According to the program notes, 'the magazine grew to become the most widely read and popular magazine in the history of the U.S. Army.' So the show's title carries both a concrete and symbolic meaning here."

The show received a workshop production as part of the Philadelphia Gay and Lesbian Theater Festival in 2004 featuring Matthew Hultgren, Peter John Rios, Kate Brennan, and Corbin Abernathy and music directed by Jeff McDonnell as well as the New York Musical Theatre Festival in 2005. The 2005 workshop featured Doug Kreeger, Jeffry Denman, Julie Foldesi, Tally Sessions and Ivan Hernandez. Both were directed by Igor Goldin and choreographed by Chase Brock.

A full production of Yank! was mounted at Brooklyn's Gallery Players from October 20 to November 4, 2007. The production starred Bobby Steggert, Nancy Anderson, Tyson Kaup, James Stover, Daniel Shevlin, Chris Carfizzi, and Maxime de Toledo. Jeffry Denman appeared again and also choreographed. Igor Goldin again directed. This production received the New York Innovative Theatre Award for Best Musical.

In 2008, the first regional production of Yank! was produced by the Diversionary Theatre in San Diego. The cast consisted of Amy Biedel, Zachary Bryant, Jacob Caltrider, Rocky DeHaro, Eric Dowdy, Tom Doyle, Juston Harlin, Tony Houck, Trevor Peringer, Sven Salumaa, John Whitley and Tom Zohar. That production won L.A. Stage Scene Awards for Best Musical (intimate theatre) and Outstanding Direction of a Musical (Igor Goldin).

== 2010 Off-Broadway ==
Yank! began preview performances at the Off-Broadway York Theatre on February 16, 2010, and opened on February 24. Originally slated to run through March 21, strong tickets sales led producers to extend the show through April 4. Steggert, Hernandez, Denman and Anderson all returned for this production and were joined in the cast by Andrew Durand, Zak Edwards, Todd Faulkner, Denis Lambert, Joseph Medeiros, David Perlman, Christopher Ruth and Tally Sessions. It was directed by Igor Goldin and choreographed by Jeffry Denman.

The York Theatre production attracted attention for its relevance during a time of national debate over the repeal effort aimed at the United States military's gay-exclusionary don't ask, don't tell (DADT) policy. The production held three Post-Performance Talkbacks: "Don't Ask, Don't Tell: The Past, Present and Future of the Historic Policy" (Moderated by Blake Hayes, Founder of Equality Army, with panelists Anthony Hayes (Human Rights Campaign) and Denny Meyer (American Veterans for Equal Rights)); "Pop Music of World War II: The Songs That Changed a Generation"; and "Gay and Lesbian Characters in Musicals: "They are what they are...".

== Broadway plans ==
The producers—Maren Berthelsen, Pamela Koslow, and Stuart Wilk, with Keith Degi, Matt Schicker, Hugh Hayes, Jim Kierstead, Joe Black, Sondra Healy and Shidan Majidi—announced plans to move Yank! to Broadway under the direction of David Cromer. Cromer would replace Igor Goldin, who had been with the production since the beginning.

The production was originally scheduled for Fall 2010 but changed to Fall 2011 or Spring 2012 to allow more time for further development of the script and score. In winter 2011, the Roundabout Theatre Company produced a workshop of a revised Yank!

As of October 2022, there has been no Broadway production.

== European premiere ==
Yank! premiered in Europe in Manchester at the Hope Mill Theatre from March 9 – April 8, 2017. Produced by Hope Mill Theatre and Ben Millerman for Mr Millerman Presents. It was directed by James Baker, choreographed by Chris Cumings and musically directed by James Cleves. The production featured Scott Hunter (Stu), Barnaby Hughes (Mitch), Chris Kiely (Artie), Spencer Cartwright (Sarge/Scarlett), Benjamin Cupit (Professor), Tom Pepper (Cohen/Speedy), Lee Dillon Stuart (Tennessee), Tom Lloyd (Rotelli), Kris Marc-Joseph (Czechowski), Mark Patterson (Lieutenant/NCO), Luke Bayer (India) and Sarah-Louise Young (Louise).

The show transferred to the Charing Cross Theatre in London's West End on 3 July 2017 and ran to 19 August 2017. Scott Hunter reprises his role as Stu alongside Andy Coxon (Mitch), Scott Davies (India), Waylon Jacobs (Sarge/Scarlet), Bradley Judge (Rotelli), Benjamin Cupit (Professor), Lee Dillon-Stuart (Tennessee), Chris Kiely (Artie), Kris Marc-Joseph (Czechowski), Mark Paterson (Lieutenant/NCO) Tom Pepper (Cohen/Speedy) and Sarah-Louise Young (Louise).

== Latin American premiere ==
Yank! received its Latin American premiere at Rio de Janeiro, Brazil, in June 2017. Produced by Leandro Terra's Silhueta Produções and George Luis, Yank! - O Musical was direteced by Menelick de Carvalho. Jules Vandystadt was the music director and orchestrator of this production. Choreographies by Clara da Costa.

The cast was led by Hugo Bonemer and Betto Marque alongside Leandro Terra, Fernanda Gabriela, Conrado Helt, Leandro Melo, Chris Penna, Dennis Pinheiro, Bruno Ganem, Robson Lima and Alain Catein.

This production got rave reviews and crowded audiences. Yank! - O Musical won 4 Brazilian National Theatre Academy Awards (including Best Musical and Best Cast) and 2 Broadway World Brazil Awards (including Best Translation).

== Critical reception ==
The New York Times gave an overall favorable review of Yank!, citing its blend of humor with drama and the quality of the songwriting. The Times noted the "accidental topicality" of the musical as it related to the DADT repeal effort. However, the paper found weaknesses in the production, notably the failure to explore some themes, specifically fidelity within gay couples and personal loyalty versus military honor. While labeling the first act "delightful", the Times found the second act to be "muddled". The creators, it says, adhere too closely to the formulas of heterosexual romantic musicals of the war era, saying that it "derails a show that had been moving along nicely". Overall, says the Times, the show suffers from being too ambitious.

== Awards and nominations ==
The York Theatre production garnered nominations for several awards for the 2009–2010 season. These included nominations for two Lucille Lortel Awards, for Outstanding Musical and Jeffry Denman for Outstanding Choreographer; two Outer Critics Circle Awards, for Outstanding New Off-Broadway Musical and Outstanding New Score (Broadway or Off-Broadway); and seven Drama Desk Awards nominations, for Outstanding Musical, Bobby Steggert for Outstanding Actor in a Musical, Jeffry Denman for Outstanding Featured Actor in a Musical, Igor Goldin for Outstanding Director of a Musical, Joseph Zellnik for Outstanding Music, David Zellnik for Outstanding Lyrics, and David Zellnik for Outstanding Book of a Musical.

The Rio de Janeiro Production won 4 Brazilian National Theatre Academy Awards (ATEB/Cenym) including Best Musical, Best Cast, Best Poster and Best Adapted Song (Um Casal de Rapazes Normais - A Couple of Regular Guys). This production also won 2 Broadway World Brazil Awards: Best Orchestrations and Best Translation.

The Off-West End production was nominated for Best Off-West End production at the 2018 WhatsOnStage Awards.
