= Danny Rutigliano =

American actor

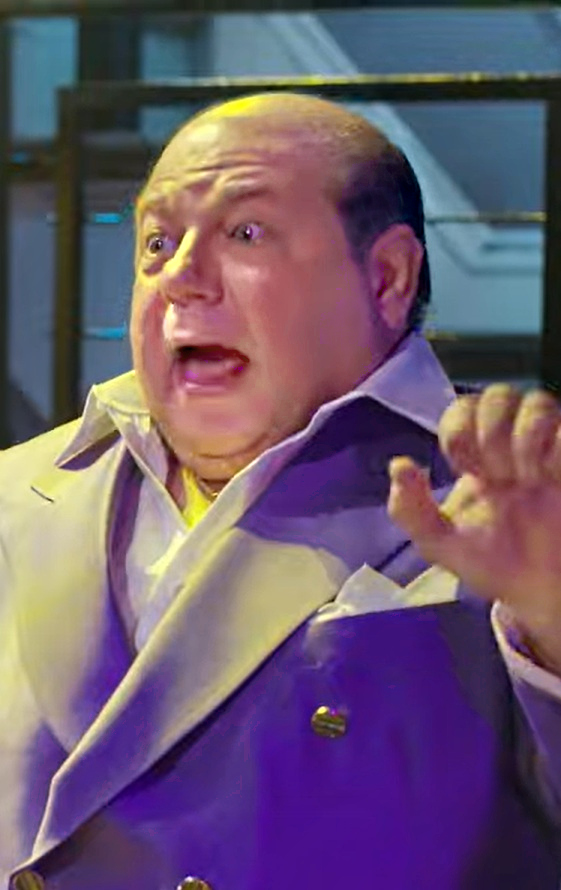
- Rutigliano in Beetlejuice 2019
- Occupation: Actor
- Years active: 1992–present
- Spouse: Jacqueline Monroe

Danny Rutigliano is an American actor.

== Career ==
He appeared on Broadway in The Best Little Whorehouse Goes Public in 1994. He has appeared in The Lion King on Broadway, portraying the character Timon; he left the show in April 2010. A member of the original cast as the understudy, he also originated the role of Timon in the L.A. Production of The Lion King, for which he received the Ovation Award for Best Featured Actor. He appeared in the Broadway revival of Born Yesterday in 2011.

He starred in Cirque du Soleil's "Banana Shpeel" in New York City in 2010.

He played the title role of Fiorello LaGuardia in the musical Fiorello! in the Encores! staged concert at New York City Center in January and February 2013. Also for Encores! he has appeared in Kismet in 2006 as "Wazir", The New Moon as "Besac" in 2003, and One Touch of Venus in 1998.

In May 2013 he performed in The Fabulous Lipitones at the Goodspeed Opera House in East Haddam, Connecticut. He appeared in How to Succeed and Godspell.

On television, Rutigliano has appeared in Without a Trace, Law & Order, Law & Order: Criminal Intent, Law & Order: Special Victims Unit, My Big Fat Greek Life, Three Sisters, and The Brothers Garcia. Rutigliano also appeared in one of the "Do It eBay" commercials. In film, he acted in Goodfellas and The Producers.

He appeared in the musical Holiday Inn on Broadway as "Danny", which ran from October 6, 2016, to January 2017. He appeared in the musical's regional productions at the Goodspeed Opera House in 2014 and at The Muny in 2015. In 2019 he originated the role of Maxie Dean in Beetlejuice, staying with the cast through their return in 2022 to close out the Broadway run.

== Personal life ==
Rutigliano is married to Jacqueline Monroe. They live in New York City.
