= Have Faith =

- Genre: Sitcom
- Created by: Nat Mauldin; Jeremy Lew; Alicia Urich
- Written by: Nat Mauldin; Tony Sheehan
- Directed by: Noam Pitlik
- Starring: (See article)
- Composer: Gordon Lustig
- Country of origin: United States
- Original language: English
- No. of seasons: 1
- No. of episodes: 7

Production
- Executive producer: John Ritter
- Producers: Alicia Ulrich; Jeremy Lew
- Production locations: Studio 22, 20th Century Fox Studios, Los Angeles
- Camera setup: Multi-camera
- Running time: 30 minutes
- Production companies: Pronoun Trouble Inc. Adam Productions; 20th Century Fox Television

Original release
- Network: ABC
- Release: April 18 – June 13, 1989

Have Faith is an American sitcom that aired on ABC for seven episodes in 1989.

== Plot ==
The story of a Catholic parish in a less-than-desirable Chicago neighborhood.

== Cast and characters ==
- Ron Carey as Father Vincent Paglia
- Stephen Furst as Father Gabriel "Gabe" Podmaninski
- Frank Hamilton as Father Edgar Tuttle
- Joel Higgins as Monsignor Joseph "Mac" MacKenzie
- Francesca P. Roberts as Sally Coleman
- Todd Susman as Arthur Glass

== Episodes ==
No.	Title	Directed by	Written by	Original release date	Prod. code	U.S. viewers (millions)	Rating/share (households)
1	"The Teacher"	Noam Pitlik	Nat Mauldin	April 18, 1989	5R01	30.1	20.2/31
Father Tuttle returns to teaching, but a scandal erupts when he hits a student. Meanwhile, parishioner Mrs. Lund is convinced that Satan is haunting her dreams. Sally basically hires herself for the job of being Monsignor Mac's secretary.
2	"Holy Smoke"	Noam Pitlik	Nat Mauldin	April 25, 1989	5R02	24.5	17.1/27
Monsignor Mac is repeatedly asked to say last rites for a man who always seem to pull through. Gabe can't decide what to do when the handyman's new assistant confesses to being a pyromaniac who's in the headlines for an arson.
3	"The Window"	Noam Pitlik	Nat Mauldin	May 2, 1989	5R06	25.7	17.7/27
Monsignor Mac's seminary buddy Rick comes for a visit and decides he wants another shot at being a priest. Meanwhile, a woman tries to convince Gabe that she has a bathroom window that glows with a heavenly light. Father Tuttle buys useless novelties from a salesman.
4	"Bingo"	Noam Pitlik	Tony Sheehan	May 16, 1989	5R03	21.4	15.5/24
Monsignor Mac worries about his personal safety when the parishioners become enraged over his cancellation of the weekly bingo game.
5	"Letters from Home"	Noam Pitlik	Nat Mauldin	May 30, 1989	5R05	22.5	15.3/26
Father Paglia refuses to meet with his dad, who is visiting him. Monsignor Mac inquires why and finds out that Paglia's father is a mobster.
6	"The Confession"	Noam Pitlik	Nat Mauldin	June 6, 1989	5R79	20.5	14.3/23
One of the priests at the parish agonizes over whether to tell the authorities that a workman confessed to him about being a serial arsonist.
7	"The Competition"	Noam Pitlik	Nat Mauldin	June 13, 1989	5R04	21.1	14.3/23
