= The Fields of Ambrosia =

- Music: Martin Silvestri
- Lyrics: Joel Higgins
- Book: Joel Higgins
- Setting: American South, 1918
- Basis: The Traveling Executioner
- Premiere: 1993: George Street Playhouse

The Fields of Ambrosia is a musical written by Joel Higgins and Martin Silvestri. It was performed in the George Street Playhouse in New Brunswick, New Jersey in 1993 and it was directed by Gregory Hurst, choreographed by Lynne Taylor-Corbett, staged by Hurst, and set design by Deborah Jasien. The cast included Christine Andreas as Gretchen Herzallerliebst, Higgins as Jonas Candide, Peter Samuel as Warden Brodsky, and Eddie Korbich as the mortician.

The 1996 production premiered at the Aldwych Theatre in London and was directed by Hurst again, with Mark Warman as musical director and a cast that included Andreas as Gretchen Herzallerliebst, Higgins as Jonas Candide, Michael Fenton Stevens as Doc, Mark Heenehan as Malcolm Piquant, Marc Joseph as Jimmy Crawford, and Roger Leach as Warden Brodsky. The show closed after only 23 performances.

The musical is based on the 1970 film The Traveling Executioner, The New York Times said The Fields of Ambrosia is a black comedy and contains violence, sex, romance, and sentiment. It takes place in a deep rural town in the American South in 1918.

== Synopsis ==
ACT 1

A steamy summer morning in the rural deep South of 1918. A gang of prisoners works along the dusty roadway leading to Fairweather State Prison (Ball and Chain). Jonas Candide, an ex-carnival barker and con-man who is now employed as the state's official "travelling executioner" arrives at the prison with his electric chair (Hubbub). He has come to attend to his next "clients" Willie and Gretchen Herzallerliebst, brother and sister German immigrants who have been convicted of murder.

Upon arrival, Jonas learns from the warden that the woman has been granted a short stay while her lawyer tries to convince the Governor to commute her sentence. Proceeding with Willie's execution, Jonas demonstrates his unique approach to the job (The Fields of Ambrosia). But something goes wrong (How Could This Happen?). Happy to put the day's events behind him, Jonas treats Jimmy, the gawky, young town mortician who idolizes him, to a night of debauchery at the local whorehouse (Nuthin').

The next evening, to satisfy his curiosity, Jonas visits Gretchen Herzallediebst in her cell. He is smitten by her beauty and wit (Who Are You?). In return for her "favors", Jonas is persuaded to buy her some more time by hiding his chair and convincing the warden that it was stolen (Reasonable Man). Gretchen's lawyer, not satisfied with that, discovers the hiding place and disables the chair with a fireaxe.

Jonas must take the chair to the local fix-it shop for repair, where the sight of it creates quite a stir among the locals (Step Right Up). Unable to stay away, he visits Gretchen again and is seduced even further (Too Bad).

Jonas comes up with a plan to save Gretchen. When the chair is ready, he will proceed with her execution, but give her only enough voltage to knock her out. Meanwhile, he will have struck a deal with the dissolute prison doctor to pronounce her dead and persuaded Jimmy to carry her out like a cadaver with no one the wiser. Doc is reluctant, saying that it's too risky and won't work. Jonas demonstrates his theory on a prison rat (The Rat is Dead). The Doc finally agrees to play his part... for a five hundred dollar bribe! Jonas vows to somehow raise the money and free Gretchen (Step Right Up - reprise).

ACT 2

Gretchen takes her mandatory hour of exercise on the prison yard inside a huge, wire cage which protects her from the male prisoners (Hungry). Jonas arrives, and bribes the guard for a moment alone with Gretchen to let her know of his plan to save her (Continental Sunday).

Jonas springs into action to raise the money to pay Doc, He smuggles the town whores into the prison late at night and, posting Jimmy as a lookout, turns Doc's infirmary into an impromptu bordello. Doc stumbles in and seeing Jonas' resourcefulness, raises his asking price to a thousand! Jonas, wondering what the hell happened to his lookout, finds Jimmy completely distraught after being assaulted by some of the inmates (Alone). Moved by Jimmy's plight, Jonas makes him his new assistant.

Jonas gets into a high-stakes poker game (The Card Game) and wins the thousand, only to be jumped, beaten and robbed by the losers. Bruised, bloody and completely broke, Jonas returns to the prison to find Deputy Warden Piquant ready to string Gretchen up while the Warden is away at the county seat. By assuring him that the chair will be ready the next morning, Jonas gets him to relent (The Gallows).

With time running out, Gretchen urges Jonas to try the local bank for the money (Do It for Me). By whipping the bank's patrons into a patriotic fervor over war bonds, he convinces the manager to give him a loan (All in this Together). However, when the manager discovers that Jonas is an ex-con, he reneges. Jonas, in a panic, makes a play for the money. With the bank alarm ringing in his ears, he beats a hasty retreat back to the prison (the getaway) to spring Gretchen, but the escape attempt goes terribly wrong (The Breakout).

Several months later, the prison yard is packed with guards and witnesses as Jonas Candide is placed in the refurbished electric chair by Jimmy, the new executioner. Jimmy gets so excited as Jonas regales him with descriptions of the hereafter (The Fields of Ambrosia - reprise) that he revs the generator way too high. When Jimmy pulls the switch everything goes up in flame and smoke. As the smoke begins to clear, we glimpse an image of Gretchen and Jonas alone on stage, waltzing.

== Song list ==
1996 Original Cast Recording

- Ball and Chain
- Hubbub
- The Fields of Ambrosia
- How Could This Happen?
- Nuthin'
- Who are You?
- Reasonable Man
- Step Right Up
- Too Bad
- Scene: That Rat is Dead/Step Right Up (reprise)
- Hungry
- Continental Sunday
- Alone
- The Card Game
- Scene: The Gallows
- Do It For Me
- All in this Together
- Scene: The Getaway
- Scene: The Breakout
- The Fields of Ambrosia (reprise)

== Reviews ==
Mike Gibb of Show Music said, "The score, courtesy of Martin Silvestri and Joel Higgins, is a joy, from the melodic and powerful titletrack through quality production numbers like 'Nuthin'' and 'Step Right Up' and that is without mentioning two of the most glorious duets you are likely to encounter in the form of 'Too Bad' and 'Continental Sunday'"

Paul Taylor of The Independent described "a reprehensibly enjoyable new musical", saying "Often very funny in its own right, the show has a number of moments where it seems to be tone deaf to its own ridiculousness."
