= First Affair =

- Genre: Romance / Drama
- Written by: Judith Parker
- Directed by: Gus Trikonis
- Starring: Melissa Sue Anderson; Loretta Swit; Joel Higgins
- Music by: Lee Holdridge
- Country of origin: United States
- Original language: English language

Production
- Producers: Andrew Gottlieb; Judith Parker
- Cinematography: Arthur J. Ornitz
- Editor: Richard Bracken
- Running time: 100 minutes

Original release
- Network: CBS
- Release: October 25, 1983

First Affair is a 1983 American made-for-television romantic drama film directed by Gus Trikonis, starring Melissa Sue Anderson, Loretta Swit, and Joel Higgins.

== Plot ==
18-year-old Toby King (Melissa Sue Anderson) arrives as a freshman at Harvard University on a full scholarship. A small-town girl from Nebraska, she is overwhelmed by her co-students. Her roommates are Cathy (Kim Delaney), a Boston native who dreams of becoming a Broadway actress, Karen (Amanda Bearse), a gifted student with an excellent record, and the shy Debbie (Robin Morse). Karen convinces Toby to join the university newspaper for extra credits; here she meets Robert (Charley Lang), who soon develops a crush on Toby. Toby is jealous of her co-students, who live a careless life and are not as affected by the pressure for good marks; Toby constantly worries about losing her scholarship and has difficulty integrating with the other students.

Despite the pressure, Toby accepts a part-time job offer from her literature professor Jane Simon (Loretta Swit) to babysit her children, Jenny (Amanda Helfen) and Collin (Jay Ine). While babysitting, Toby meets and immediately falls for Jane's 40-year-old husband Greg Simon (Joel Higgins), a successful architect who recently has grown tired of his wife after having been married with her for over 16 years. Greg develops a crush on Toby and starts taking her out. Before long, a love affair develops. Toby starts to fall in love with Greg and becomes torn between doing the right thing and following her heart. Ultimately, Jane catches them in the act and kicks Greg out of the house. He decides to try and save his marriage, leaving behind Toby heartbroken. As time passes, she gradually gets over Greg and is forgiven by Jane for her actions.

== Cast ==
- Melissa Sue Anderson as Toby King
- Loretta Swit as Jane Simon
- Joel Higgins as Greg Simon
- Kim Delaney as Cathy
- Amanda Bearse as Karen
- Robin Morse as Debbie
- Charley Lang as Robert
- Robert Curtis Brown as Donald
- Diane Shalet as Claire King
- Amanda Helfen as Jenny Simon
- Jay Ine as Collin Simon

== Video/DVD ==
First Affair was released on VHS by CBS Fox Home Video in 1987.
