= Let's Have Another Cup of Coffee =

Song by Irving Berlin

"Let's Have Another Cup of Coffee" is a song by Irving Berlin appearing in the musical comedy Face the Music, which opened in 1932. On opening night it was sung by J. Harold Murray and Katherine Carrington. The song, set in a self-service restaurant modeled on the Horn & Hardart Automat, is sung in the play by a group of once-wealthy citizens who were awaiting better times, as mirrored in the song's opening lyrics:

Just around the corner,
there's a rainbow in the sky,
So let's have another cup of coffee,
and let's have another piece of pie.

The hit version was released in 1932 on the RCA Victor label (Victor 22936) by Fred Waring and his Pennsylvanians with vocals by Chick Bullock with the Three Waring Girls.

== Covers ==
- Glenn Miller and His Orchestra with refrain by Marion Hutton, Ernie Caceres and The Modernaires recorded their version in New York City on January 5, 1942. It was released by Bluebird Records as catalog number B 11450A (in USA) and by EMI on the His Master's Voice label as catalog number BD 5784.
- Sammy Kaye recorded a version (Victor 27780) in 1942 with the Three Kaydets vocalizing.
- Burl Ives included the song in his album Burl Ives Sings Irving Berlin (1960).
- Tage Danielsson made a Swedish adaption, "Kaffe och bullar gör mig glad", which he performed in the cabaret Lådan (1966-1967), which also was filmed (1968).
