= Ava Della Pietra =

American singer and songwriter (born 2005)

- Born: May 31, 2005 (age 21); New York
- Genres: Pop
- Occupations: singer, songwriter, multi-instrumentalist
- Instruments: guitar, vocals
- Website: www.avadellapietra.com

Ava Della Pietra (born May 31, 2005) is an American singer-songwriter and multi-instrumentalist.

== Early life and education ==
Della Pietra was born in New York to an Italian-American family. She began performing at age four and writing songs at age five. She is a multi-instrumentalist who plays violin, guitar, piano and bass guitar. Della Pietra is enrolled in the Harvard University/Berklee College of Music dual program, class of 2027.

== Career ==
At age 7, Della Pietra performed on the national tours of Les Misérables and White Christmas before joining the original Broadway cast of School of Rock. She has been featured on Good Morning America, Sesame Street (PBS), the Tony Awards and Last Week Tonight with John Oliver.

In 2019, Della Pietra launched her solo music career with "Christmas Tonight," which she wrote with producing partner Will Hicks. The song was named one of Tiger Beat's "Best Holiday Songs of 2019" and 360 Magazine called it "a beautiful and uplifting new song about the magic of the holiday season".

Della Pietra's 2020 single "Optimist" earned praise from American Songwriter Magazine, who called it "bold," "refreshing," and "radio-ready". and Newsday, who cited Della Pietra a "rising star".

In 2020 Della Pietra sang the Star-Spangled Banner for the New York Open at Nassau Veterans Memorial Coliseum

Ava released the single Home in 2021. Parade called the track "a pop ray of hope".

i've been thinking was the first single off of Della Pietra's 2022 debut EP truth or truth, a collaboration with Nashville based producer Steven Martinez. She performed power of you, another single from the album on WSMV's Today in Nashville.

In 2023 Della Pietra released several singles including happy for you, it started with u and ego. ego earned her the top prize at the Songwriters Guild of America SGA Awards Pop Song contest and a Los Angeles Film Award for Best Song. The video, directed by Adam Lukowski, won Best Video of 2023 awards from the Sweden Film Awards, New York International Film Awards, Berlin Indie Film Festival, London Independent Film Awards, Los Angeles International Film Festival's Indie Short Fest and the Rome International Movie Awards. A follow up single, talk it out was released shortly after.

Della Pietra's 2025 singles Marionette, Moon Over Capri, 2 Can Play and Single for Life point towards her growth and reinvention. In The Hollywood Digest, Garth Thomas wrote, "Marionette is a powerful testament to her artistic growth and ability to blend theatricality with contemporary pop sensibilities. Music News said, "On Marionette, Ava steps into a new creative dimension - one that is darker, eerier, and unafraid to explore the haunting corners of control and manipulation." And Stage Magazine pointed out that Della Pietra is, "a pop star who refuses to play it safe". It won Best Music Video and Best Song at multiple festivals including Cannes World Film Festival.

Moon Over Capri is dedicated to Della Pietra's grandfather. It won Best Music Video and Best Song at multiple film festivals including Cannes World Film Festival and the International Independent Film Awards.

Upon releasing 2 Can Play Indie Boulevard wrote, "Her newest single is an embodiment of everything Ava has steadily become known for, yet this time she delivers something surprisingly more incisive, more commercially honed." It has won multiple awards including Best Pop Music Video at the Hollywood Best Indie Film Festival.

Single for Life was co-produced with Alex Koste. Lock, a UK based music magazine advocating for female musicians wrote that the song showcases Della Pietra's willingness to be, "cheeky, stylish, and self-aware".

== Discography ==
=== Singles ===
Year	Song	Chart
2019	Christmas Tonight	
2020	Optimist	
2021	Home	
2022	power of you	#21 AC Billboard Radio Chart
2022	depend on me	
2022	long way home	
2022	my boyfriend	
2022	i've been thinking	
2023	it started with u	
2023	happy for u	#31 AC Hot Chart
2023	worst of times	
2023	ego	
2023	talk it out	
2024	sick	
2024	rearview mirror	
2024	Reindeer Rebellion	
2025	Marionette	
2025	Moon Over Capri	
2025	Single For Life	
2025	2 Can Play	
2026	3am	

== EP's ==
Year	Title	Chart
2022	truth or truth	

== Awards and honors ==
Year	Award	Category	Work	Result	Ref
2016	The Fred & Adele Astaire Awards	Outstanding Ensemble in a Broadway Show	"School of Rock"	Nominated	
2019	Scholastic Art & Writing Award	Gold Key for Excellence in Writing			
2019	Mid-Atlantic Song Contest	Best Song	"Christmas Tonight"		
2020	Scholastic Art & Writing Award	Gold Key for Excellence in Writing			
2020	West Coast Songwriter Competition	Best Song	"Optimist"		
2021	New York State School Music Association Songwriters Showcase	Best Song	"Optimist"		
2021	The New York Young Performers Prize	Second Prize, Advanced Level			
2022	Songwriter Universe	Best Song	"Depend On Me"		
2023	Cannes World Film Festival	Best Song	"Talk it Out"	Won	
2023	New York International Film Awards - NYIFA (December 2023)	Best Song	"Talk it Out"	Won	
2023	Sweden Film Awards	Best Music Video	"Talk it Out"	Won	
2023	Oniros Film Awards (December 2023)	Best Music Video	"Talk it Out"	Won	
2023	Rome International Movie Awards (December 2023)	Best Music Video	"Talk it Out"	Won	
2023	London Independent Film Awards	Best Music Video	"Talk it Out"	Won	
2023	IndieX Film Festival (December 2023)	Best Original Song & Best Music Video	"Talk it Out"	Won	
2023	South Film and Arts Academy Festival	Best Art Direction in a Short Film	"Talk it Out"	Honorable Mention	
2023	Indie Short Fest	Best Original Song	"Talk it Out"	Won	
2023	Global Film Festival Awards	Best Music Video	"Ego"	Won	
2023	Robinson Film Awards (International Film Festival)	Best Music Video	"Ego"	Won	
2023	New York International Film Awards - NYIFA (October 2023)	Best Music Video	"Ego"	Won	
2023	Sweden Film Awards	Best Music Video	"Ego"	Won	
2023	Stafford Film Festival	Best Music Video	"Ego"	Won	
2023	Rome International Movie Awards (October 2023)	Best Music Video	"Ego"	Won	
2023	International Independent Film Awards	Diamond Best Music Video & Original Song	"Ego"	Won	
2023	IndieX Film Festival (October 2023)	Best Music Video	"Ego"	Won	
2023	South Film and Arts Academy Festival	Best Music Video & Editing	"Ego"	Honorable Mention in a Short Film	
2023	Indie Short Fest	Outstanding Achievement Award (Music Video)	"Ego"	Won	
2023	London Art Film Awards	Best Lyrics Song	"Ego"	Won	
2023	CKF International Film Festival	Best Music Video of the Month	"Ego"	Won	
2023	Festigious Los Angeles - Monthly Film Competition	Best Song	"Ego"	Won	
2023	Los Angeles Film Awards	Best Song	"Ego"	Won	
2023	The I AM Film Festival (London UK)	Best Music Video	"Ego"	Won	
2023	Top Shorts	Best Music Video & Best Song	"Ego"	Won	
2023	Luleå International Film Festival	Best Music Video	"Ego"	Won	
2023	Music Video Awards	Best Song	"Ego"	Won	
2023	Latitude Film Awards	Bronze	"Ego"	Won	
2023	Carpe Diem	Best Music Video	"Ego"	Won	
2023	ICE CineFest	Best Music Video	"Ego"	Won	
2023	F3: Queen City Film Festival, Film Curation, & Film Awards	Best Music Video	"Ego"	Won	
2023	Feel The Reel International Film Festival	Best Music Video	"Ego"	Won	
2023	Indie House	Best Music Video	"Ego"	Won	
2023	International Music Video Underground	Best Music Video	"Ego"	Won	
2023	Avalonia Festival - Short Films, etc.	Best Music Video / Musical 180	"Ego"	Won	
2023	Unsigned Only	Best Song	"Happy For You"		
2023	Songwriter Universe	Best Song	"Worst Of Times"		
2023	Songwriter's Guild of America	Best Song	"Ego"	Won	
2023	Los Angeles Film Awards	Best Song	"Ego"	Won	
2023	Music Video Awards	Best Song	"Ego"		
2023	International Independent Film Awards	Best Song	"Ego"		
2024	Latitude Film Awards	Bronze	"Talk it Out"	Won	
2024	Global Film Festival Awards	Best Music Video	"Talk it Out"	Won	
2024	Carpe Diem	Best Music Video	"Talk it Out"	Won	
2024	Oakland Film Festival	Best Music Video	"Talk it Out"	Won	
2024	Berlin Indie Film Festival	Best Music Video	"Talk it Out"	Won	
2024	Top Shorts	Best Music Video	"Talk it Out"	Won	
2024	Paris Lady MovieMakers Festival	Best Music Video	"Talk it Out"	Won	
2024	Los Angeles Film Festival STORYTELLA	Best Music Video	"Ego"	Won	
2024	Solaris Film Festival	Best Music Video	"Ego"	Won	
2024	VIFF Vienna Independent Film Festival	Best Song	"Ego"	Won	
2024	New York True Venture Film Festival - NYTVFF	Best Music Video	"Ego"	Won	
2024	Indie Filmmaker Awards	Best Music Video (U.S.)(under 4 minutes)	"Ego"	Won	
2024	Short. Sweet. Film Fest.	Outstanding Music Video	"Ego"	Won	
2024	Aphrodite Film Awards	Best Piece of Music (Only Music)	"Ego"	Won	
2024	World Music & Independent Film Festival	Best Pop Music Video & Best Director in Music Video	"Ego"	Won	
2024	UK Songwriting Contest	Best Christmas Song	"Reindeer Rebellion"	Won	
2024	MegaFlix Movie Awards	Best Music Video	“Talk It Out”	Won	
2025	Best Hollywood Day Shorts Film Festival	Best Music Video	"2 Can Play"	Won	
2025	Cannes World Film Festival	Best Song	"2 Can Play"	Won	
2025	Depth of Field International Film Festival	Outstanding Excellence	"2 Can Play"	Won	
2025	Hollywood Best Indie Film Festival	Best Pop Music Video	"2 Can Play"	Won	
2025	International Independent Film Awards	Platinum: Best Music Video & Song	"2 Can Play"	Won	
2025	LA Film & Documentary Award	Best Pop Music Video	"2 Can Play"	Won	
2025	Los Angeles Movie & Music Video Awards	Best Music Video	"2 Can Play"	Won	
2025	Oniros Film Awards (August 2025)	Best Song	"2 Can Play"	Won	
2025	Rome International Movie Awards (August 2025)	Best Music Video	"2 Can Play"	Won	
2025	Best Hollywood Day Shorts Film Festival	Best Pop Music Video	"Marionette"	Won	
2025	Cannes World Film Festival	Best Music Video	"Marionette"	Won	
2025	Chicago Indie Film Awards	Best Music Video	"Marionette"	Won	
2025	Dallas Shorts	Best Music Video	"Marionette"	Won	
2025	Depth of Field International Film Festival	Outstanding Excellence	"Marionette"	Won	
2025	Feel The Reel International Film Festival	Best Music Video	"Marionette"	Won	
2025	Frames of Newyork	Best Music Video	"Marionette"	Won	
2025	Hollywood Best Indie Film Festival	Best Music Video	"Marionette"	Won	
2025	Indie Short Fest	Best Original Song	"Marionette"	Won	
2025	IndieX Film Festival (September 2025)	Best Music Video	"Marionette"	Won	
2025	International Independent Film Awards	Platinum: Best Music Video & Song	"Marionette"	Won	
2025	LA Film & Documentary Award	Best Music Video	"Marionette"	Won	
2025	London Independent Film Awards	Best Music Video	"Marionette"	Won	
2025	London Vision Film Festival	Best Music Video	"Marionette"	Won	
2025	Los Angeles Film Awards	Best Music Video	"Marionette"	Won	
2025	Luleå International Film Festival	Best Music Video	"Marionette"	Won	
2025	New York International Film Awards - NYIFA (August 2025)	Best Song	"Marionette"	Won	
2025	Oniros Film Awards (August 2025)	Best Music Video	"Marionette"	Won	
2025	Palermo International Film Festival	Best Music Video	"Marionette"	Won	
2025	Rome International Movie Awards (August 2025)	Best Experimental	"Marionette"	Won	
2025	South Film and Arts Academy Festival	Best Art Direction in a Short Film	"Marionette"	Won	
2025	Sweden Film Awards	Best Music Video	"Marionette"	Won	
2025	Top Shorts	Best Music Video	"Marionette"	Won	
2025	Toronto Indie Shorts	Best Music Video	"Marionette"	Won	
2025	Cannes Independent Shorts	Best Music Video	"Moon Over Capri"	Won	
2025	Depth of Field International Film Festival	Excellence	"Moon Over Capri"	Won	
2025	Hollywood Best Indie Film Festival	Best Original Song	"Moon Over Capri"	Won	
2025	Hong Kong Indie Film Festival	Best Music Video	"Moon Over Capri"	Won	
2025	International Independent Film Awards	Platinum: Best Music Video & Song	"Moon Over Capri"	Won	
2025	Los Angeles Movie & Music Video Awards	Best Original Song	"Moon Over Capri"	Won	
2025	Rome International Movie Awards (August 2025)	Best Music Video	"Moon Over Capri"	Won	
2025	South Film and Arts Academy Festival	Best Music Video	"Moon Over Capri"	Won	
2025	VIFF Vienna Independent Film Festival	Best Song	"Moon Over Capri"	Won	
2025	International Music Video Awards	Best Pop Video, Best North America Music Video, Best Makeup	"Marionette"	Won	
2025	Amsterdam Movie Fest	Best Music Video	"Single For Life"	Won	
2025	Best Hollywood Day Shorts Film Festival	Best American Music Video	"Single For Life"	Won	
2025	California Music Video & Film Awards	Best Movement (Choreography in a Music Video)	"Single For Life"	Won	
2025	Cannes Independent Shorts	Best Music Video	"Single For Life"	Won	
2025	Cannes World Film Festival	Best Original Song	"Single For Life"	Won	
2025	CKF International Film Festival	Best Music Video	"Single For Life"	Won	
2025	Feel The Reel International Film Festival	Best Music Video	"Single For Life"	Won	
2025	Festigious Los Angeles - Monthly Film Competition	Best Music Video	"Single For Life"	Won	
2025	Frames of Newyork	Best Music Video (Season 3)	"Single For Life"	Won	
2025	Hollywood Best Indie Film Festival	Best American Music Video	"Single For Life"	Won	
2025	Indie Short Fest	Best Music Video	"Single For Life"	Won	
2025	International Independent Film Awards	Platinum: Best Music Video & Best Song	"Single For Life"	Won	
2025	LA Film & Documentary Award	Best Pop Music Video	"Single For Life"	Won	
2025	London Independent Film Awards	Best Music Video	"Single For Life"	Won	
2025	London Vision Film Festival	Best Music Video	"Single For Life"	Won	
2025	Los Angeles Film Awards	Best Music Video	"Single For Life"	Won	
2025	Los Angeles Movie & Music Video Awards	Best American Music Video	"Single For Life"	Won	
2025	Luleå International Film Festival	Best Music Video	"Single For Life"	Won	
2025	New York International Film Awards - NYIFA	Best Music Video	"Single For Life"	Won	
2025	Oniros Film Awards	Best Original Song	"Single For Life"	Won	
2025	Palermo International Film Festival	Best Music Video	"Single For Life"	Won	
2025	Rome International Movie Awards	Best Music Video and Best Original Score	"Single For Life"	Won	
2025	South Film and Arts Academy Festival	Best Music Video	"Single For Life"	Won	
2025	Sweden Film Awards	Best Music Video	"Single For Life"	Won	
2025	Top Shorts	Best Music Video	"Single For Life"	Won	
2025	Toronto Indie Shorts	Best Music Video	"Single For Life"	Won	
2025	Vegas Independent Film Awards	Best Music Video	"Single For Life"	Won	
2025	California Music Video & Film Awards	Best Pop Music Video	"2 Can Play"	Won	
2025	Global Film Festival Awards	Best Music Video	"2 Can Play"	Won	
2025	MegaFlix Movie Awards	Best Music Video	"2 Can Play"	Won	
2025	Santa Ana Independent Film Awards	Best Music Video	"2 Can Play"	Won	
2025	Washington Film Awards	Best Music Video	"2 Can Play"	Won	
2025	Amsterdam Movie Fest	Best Music Video	"Marionette"	Won	
2025	Berlin Indie Film Festival	Best Music Video	"Marionette"	Won	
2025	Dallas Shorts	Best Music Video	"Marionette"	Won	
2025	Festigious Los Angeles - Monthly Film Competition	Best Music Video	"Marionette"	Won	
2025	Hollywood Stage Script Film Competition	Best Music Video	"Marionette"	Won	
2025	New Orleans International Film Awards	Best Music Video	"Marionette"	Won	
2025	New York Film & Cinematography Awards	Best Music Video	"Marionette"	Won	
2025	The I AM Film Festival (London UK)	Best Music Video	"Marionette"	Won	
2025	Brussels World Film Festival	Best Music Video	"Moon Over Capri"	Won	
2025	Indianapolis Independent Film Festival	Best Music Video	"Moon Over Capri"	Won	
2025	Hollywood International Golden Age Festival	Best Music Video	“2 Can Play”	Won	
2026	New York Independent Cinema Awards	Best Music Video	"Single For Life"	Won	
2026	ORION IFF International Film Festival	Best Music Clip	"Marionette"	Won	
