= White Christmas (musical) =

Musical by Irving Berlin, David Ives and Paul Blake

- Music: Irving Berlin
- Lyrics: Irving Berlin
- Book: David Ives; Paul Blake
- Basis: White Christmas by Norman Krasna; Norman Panama; Melvin Frank
- Premiere: July 17, 2000: The Muny, St. Louis
- Productions: 2000 The Muny; 2004 US National Tour; 2007 UK Tour; 2008 Broadway; 2009 US National Tour; 2009 Broadway; 2014 West End revival 2016–2018 US National Tour; 2019 West End revival

White Christmas is a musical based on the Paramount Pictures 1954 film of the same name. The book is by David Ives and Paul Blake, with music and lyrics by Irving Berlin. The original St. Louis production starred Lara Teeter, Karen Mason, Lauren Kennedy, and Lee Roy Reams, and the 2004 San Francisco production starred Brian D'Arcy James, Anastasia Barzee, Meredith Patterson, and Jeffry Denman.

== Productions ==
=== Regional ===
The musical, titled Irving Berlin's White Christmas, premiered in St. Louis in 2000 at The Muny, after which it opened in San Francisco in 2004. It has since played in various venues in the US and Canada, such as Boston, Buffalo, Los Angeles, Toronto, Winnipeg, Vancouver, Detroit, Denver, St. Paul, and Louisville.

=== UK tour (2006–2011) ===
The musical toured over the Christmas seasons of 2006–07 (to Plymouth and Southampton) and 2007–08 (to Edinburgh and Cardiff). The cast for the tour included Craig McLachlan as Bob, Tim Flavin as Phil, Rachel as Betty, Emma Kate Nelson as Judy, Ken Kercheval as The General and Lorna Luft as Martha. The same production reappeared at the Theatre Royal, Plymouth, in November 2009, before transferring to The Lowry, Manchester for Christmas and into early 2010. Aled Jones, Suzanne Shaw, Adam Cooper, Louise Plowright, Rachel Stanley and Roy Dotrice starred. The same production played from November 2010 until January 2011 at the Sunderland Empire Theatre, starring Tom Chambers, Cooper, Stanley, Louise Bowden, Ken Kercheval and Kerry Washington. All of the UK tours featured the original choreography of Randy Skinner.

=== Broadway 2008–09 and U.S. tour ===
White Christmas played a limited engagement on Broadway at the Marquis Theatre, which started in previews on November 14, 2008 running through January 4, 2009, for 53 performances and 12 previews. The production was directed by Walter Bobbie and choreographed by Skinner. The cast featured Stephen Bogardus, Kerry O'Malley, Jeffry Denman, Meredith Patterson, Susan Mansur and Charles Dean, all of whom had performed in regional productions.

The musical returned to the Marquis Theatre from November 13, 2009 (previews) through January 3, 2010. Bobbie and Skinner again directed and choreographed. The cast featured James Clow as Bob, Mara Davi as Judy, Melissa Errico as Betty, Tony Yazbeck as Phil, David Ogden Stiers as General Waverly, and Ruth Williamson as Martha. Lighting design was by Ken Billington. This production also had a U.S. national tour, starting in Omaha, Nebraska, on November 1, 2009, and ending in Kansas City, Missouri, on January 5, 2010.

=== 2009 Australia ===
The musical was staged anew by MLOC Productions Inc at the Phoenix Theatre in Elwood, Victoria. The production was directed by Judy Sullivan, with choreography was by Merilyn Young. The cast featured Peter Phillips as Bob, John Davidson as Phil, Rowena Brown as Betty, and Kate Knight as Judy. It started its run on 6 November 2009, running through 14 November, and had a second run from 18 to 20 December.

=== 2014 and 2019 West End ===
The musical played the Dominion Theatre in 2014 in a limited engagement and starred Aled Jones, Tom Chambers, Rachel Stanley, Louise Bowden, and Wendi Peters. Randy Skinner's original Broadway choreography was re-created for the West End production.

After a tryout in 2018–2019 at Curve Theatre, Leicester, UK, a 2019 West End revival opened at the Dominion Theatre in London on 15 November 2019 and closed on 4 January 2020. It was directed by Nikolai Foster with new choreography by Stephen Mear. The cast included Danny Mac as Bob, Dan Burton as Phil, Clare Halse as Judy, Danielle Hope as Betty and Brenda Edwards as Martha.

=== 2007–2019 U.S. tours ===
From 2007 to 2019 (except 2008), brief tours were conducted each November and December (and sometimes running into the first week of the following January.

The 2012 White Christmas tour, directed by Norb Joerder and choreographed by Skinner, opened on November 11, 2012 and closed on January 6, 2013 after a month-long run at the Kennedy Center in Washington, D.C. The cast included James Clow, Stefanie Morse, David Elder, Mara Davi, Ruth Williamson, Joseph Costa, Cliff Bemis, Shannon Harrington, Tony Lawson, Andie Mechanic and Kilty Reidy. Another tour the following year, also directed by Joerder and choreographed by Skinner, opened on November 2, 2013 and closed on December 29, 2013. The cast featured Clow, Trista Moldovan, David Elder, Patterson, Williamson, Costa, Bemis, Cory Bretsch, Harrington, Lawson, and Grace Matwijec. Another U.S tour over the Christmas season of 2014–2015, started in previews on November 11, 2014 running through January 4, 2015. The production was directed and choreographed by Skinner. The cast featured Jeremy Benton, Clow, Kaitlyn Davidson, Moldovan, Bemis, Danny Gardner, Pamela Myers, Ryan Reilly, Conrad John Schuck, Elizabeth Crawford and Ava Della Pietra.

The 2016–2019 tours were directed and choreographed by Skinner, with Sean Montgomery as Bob, Benton as Phil, Kerry Conte as Betty, Kelly Sheehan as Judy, and Karen Ziemba as Martha. The tour closed in Boston at the Wang Center on December 29, 2019.

=== 2023–2024 Sheffield, England ===
The musical was played at the Sheffield Crucible from December 2023 until January 2024. The cast included Grace Mouat as Betty, George Blagden as Bob, Sandra Marvin as Martha, Stuart Neal as Phil, and Craig Armstrong as Ezekiel. The production was directed by Paul Foster.

== Critical response and awards ==
Critics of the Broadway production were unimpressed, including Charles Isherwood of The New York Times, who wrote that the show was as "fresh and appealing as a roll of Necco wafers found in a mothballed Christmas stocking." Nevertheless, the show received two 2009 Tony Award nominations for Best Choreography (Randy Skinner) and Best Orchestrations (Larry Blank). It also received 2009 Drama Desk Award nominations for Walter Bobbie, Outstanding Director of a Musical, Outstanding Choreography, Outstanding Orchestrations, Outstanding Set Design of a Musical (Anna Louizos), Outstanding Costume Design (Carrie Robbins), and Outstanding Sound Design (Acme Sound Partners).

== Musical numbers ==
Act I

- "Overture" - Orchestra
- "Happy Holiday (1944)" – Bob Wallace and Phil Davis
- "White Christmas (Music Box)" – Bob, Phil, Ralph Sheldrake and Ensemble
- "Happy Holiday / Let Yourself Go" – Bob, Phil and Ensemble
- "Love and the Weather" – Bob and Betty Haynes
- "Sisters" – Betty and Judy Haynes
- "The Best Things Happen While You're Dancing" – Phil and Quintet
- "Snow" – Phil, Judy, Bob, Betty, Mr. and Mrs. Snoring Man and Ensemble
- "What Can You Do With a General?" – Martha Watson, Bob and Phil
- "Let Me Sing and I'm Happy" – Martha
- "Count Your Blessings (Instead of Sheep)" – Bob and Betty
- "Blue Skies" – Bob and Ensemble

Act II

- "Entr'acte" – Orchestra
- "I Love a Piano" - Phil, Judy and Ensemble
- "Falling Out of Love Can Be Fun" – Martha, Betty and Judy
- "Sisters" (reprise) – Bob and Phil
- "Love, You Didn't Do Right By Me / How Deep Is the Ocean?" – Betty and Bob
- "The Old Man (Prelude)" – Bob and Male Ensemble
- "Let Me Sing and I'm Happy" (reprise) – Susan Waverly
- "How Deep Is the Ocean?" (reprise) – Betty and Bob
- "The Old Man" – Bob, Phil, Ralph and Male Ensemble
- "White Christmas" – Bob and Company
- "I've Got My Love to Keep Me Warm" – Full Company (Post - Curtain Call)

== Casts ==
Role	The Muny	Broadway		US Tour
Role	2000	2008	2009	
Bob Wallace	Lara Teeter	Stephen Bogardus	James Clow	Stephen Bogardus
Phil Davis	Lee Roy Reams	Jeffry Denman	Tony Yazbeck	David Elder
Betty Hanes	Karen Mason	Kerry O'Malley	Melissa Errico	Kerry O'Malley
Judy Hanes	Lauren Kennedy	Meredith Patterson	Mara Davi	Megan Sikora
General Henry Waverly	Howard Keel	Charles Dean	David Ogden Stiers	Barry Flatman
Martha Watson	Karen Morrow	Susan Mansur	Ruth Williamson	Lorna Luft
Susan Waverly	Melody Hollis			
Ezekiel Foster/Mr. Snoring Man	Cliff Bemis			
Mike Nulty/Announcer	Sheffield Chastain			
Ralph Sheldrake	Peter Reardon			
