= Randy Skinner =

American dancer, director and choreographer

- Born: Columbus, Ohio, United States
- Education: Ohio State University, BS in Education
- Occupations: Director, choreographer, dancer, educator
- Years active: 1973 - present

Randy Skinner is an American dancer, director and choreographer, primarily for the stage. He has been nominated four times for Tony Awards, three times for Drama Desk Awards, and four times for Outer Critics Circle Awards for choreography.

== Early life and education ==
Skinner was born in Columbus, Ohio. He attended Upper Arlington High School where he was valedictorian, and graduated from Ohio State University, with a major in speech and communication and a minor in psychology.

== Career ==
Skinner began his professional career with the well known Kenley Players, dancing in numerous productions such as The Pajama Game, No No Nanette, Anything Goes, Mack and Mabel, Funny Girl, Grease, and Walking Happy, all produced by John Kenley. He moved to New York in 1976 seeking dancing jobs. In 1979 he danced in Radio City Music Hall's A New York Summer which was the premiere production of the newly re-opened and landmarked theatre. Gower Champion asked him to be a dance assistant on 42nd Street in 1980. In 1985, Ginger Rogers cast him as Val opposite Karen Ziemba and asked him to choreograph a production of Babes in Arms that she directed in upstate New York and in Connecticut. Other performances include playing Pa Dolan in the City Center Encores! On Your Toes, Bobby in the National Tour of A Chorus Line, and dancing in the premiere production of the American Dance Machine at Ford's Theatre.

His Broadway work as a choreographer includes Dames at Sea (also directing). Skinner said that he played the role of "Dick" and choreographed Dames At Sea in an Ohio State University production in 1973, as an undergraduate. Skinner noted that "My influence has always been from the movies." He added "I'm very protective of my dancers. If I'm choreographing a trick or a lift, I always consider, "Can this be done eight times a week joyfully and safely without the dancer fretting about it?"

Other work includes Irving Berlin's White Christmas and State Fair. He choreographed the Broadway revival of 42nd Street in 2001 and also choreographed and staged the London, Germany, Australia and two U.S. national companies and the Amsterdam production of the musical. He has choreographed many productions for the City Center Encores! series, including Do Re Mi (1999), Of Thee I Sing (May 2006), Face The Music (March 2007), No, No Nanette (May 2008), Gentlemen Prefer Blondes (May 2012) and Lady Be Good (February 2015). His Off-Broadway and regional theatre choreography work includes productions of Irving Berlin's White Christmas around the U.S. and the UK, Garry Marshall's Happy Days (2006 in Los Angeles), Lone Star Love (2004 Off-Broadway; 2007 Seattle), Babes in Arms (2002 at the Goodspeed Opera House), Abby's Song (1999 Off-Broadway, also directing) and Lucky in the Rain (1997 at Goodspeed). He has received the Los Angeles Drama Critics Circle Award, Drama-Logue Award, and Connecticut Critics Circle Award among others. He has received the Hoofer Award from the American Tap Dance Foundation (2009), the Flo-Bert Award (2010), and the Juba! Award from the Chicago Human Rhythm Project (2011). Skinner's tap dancing has been heard on numerous recordings including Lucky In The Rain, Sondheim At The Movies, 110 In The Shade, and Strike Up The Band. On September 11, 2017 Skinner directed the inaugural production of the Chita Rivera Awards for Dance and Choreography held at the Hirschfeld Theatre.

== Teaching career ==
In addition to his theatrical career, Skinner is also a guest teacher at various colleges and universities and at both Steps on Broadway and Broadway Dance Center in NYC. The Randy Skinner Collection was established at Ohio State University's Jerome Lawrence and Robert E. Lee Theatre Research Institute, with his notes, scripts, playbills, posters, and personal papers.

== Additional work ==
(As choreographer, except as otherwise noted)

- Gotta Dance with American Dance Machine - 2026 Off-Broadway Stage 42 (Co-Director and Additional Choreography)
- 42nd Street - 2022 Goodspeed Musicals (also Director)
- Cheek To Cheek: Irving Berlin In Hollywood - 2021 Off-Broadway York Theatre (also Conceiver/Director)
- 42nd Street - 2017 West End[12]
- Irving Berlin's White Christmas - 2014 West End
- Show Boat - 2014 Live from Lincoln Center with the NY Philharmonic Orchestra
- Lend Me A Tenor (musical) - 2011 West End
- After the Night and the Music - 2005 Broadway (also dance music arranger)
- Tony Awards Opening Production Number - 2001
- George M! - 2000 Goodspeed Musicals
- Ain't Broadway Grand - 1993 Broadway
- Pal Joey - 1991 Long Beach Civic Light Opera
- Hello Dolly - 1991 Long Beach Civic Light Opera
- Strike Up The Band - 1988 California Music Theatre

== Awards and nominations ==
- 2026 Chita Rivera Douglas and Ethel Watt Critics' Choice Award (awarded) - Gotta Dance
- 2026 Off Broadway Alliance Award for Best Unique Theatrical Experience (nominated) - Gotta Dance
- 2023 Connecticut Critics Circle Award for Outstanding Choreography (won) - 42nd Street
- 2023 Connecticut Critics Circle Award for Outstanding Director of a Musical - 42nd Street (nominated)
- 2022 Lucille Lortel Award for Outstanding Choreographer (nominated)- Cheek To Cheek: Irving Berlin in Hollywood
- 2018 Olivier Award for Best Theatre Choreographer (nominated) - 42nd Street
- 2018 WhatsOnStage Award for Best Choreography (won) - 42nd Street
- 2016 Tony Award for Best Choreography (nominated) - Dames At Sea
- 2016 Drama Desk Award for Outstanding Choreography (nominated) - Dames At Sea
- 2016 Outer Critics Circle Award for Outstanding Choreography (nominated) - Dames At Sea
- 2016 Astaire Award for Best Choreographer (nominated) - Dames At Sea
- 2009 Tony Award for Best Choreography (nominated) - Irving Berlin's White Christmas
- 2009 Drama Desk Award for Outstanding Choreography (nominated) - Irving Berlin's White Christmas
- 2004 Lucille Lortel Award for Outstanding Choreographer (nominated) - Lone Star Love
- 2003 Connecticut Critics Circle Award for Outstanding Choreography (nominated) - Babes In Arms
- 2001 Tony Award for Best Choreography (nominated) - 42nd Street
- 2001 Drama Desk Award for Outstanding Choreography (nominated) - 42nd Street
- 2001 Outer Critics Circle Award for Outstanding Choreography (nominated) - 42nd Street
- 2001 Astaire Award for Best Choreographer (nominated) - 42nd Street
- 1998 Connecticut Critics Circle Award for Outstanding Choreography (won) - Lucky in the Rain
- 1996 Outer Critics Circle Award for Outstanding Choreography (nominated) - State Fair
- 1993 Tony Award for Best Choreography (nominated) - Ain't Broadway Grand
- 1993 Outer Critics Circle Award for Outstanding Choreography (nominated) - Ain't Broadway Grand
