= After the Night and the Music =

Play written by Elaine May

After the Night and the Music is a one-act play in three parts, written by Elaine May. It opened in 2005. May derived the name of the play from the Howard Dietz song "You and the Night and the Music".

== Plot ==
=== Curtain Raiser ===
Curtain Raiser is set in the bar of a dance hall where a grim woman and an overweight former dance instructor connect. The grim woman attempts to deflect any advances by the man, telling him that when dancing she can only lead. In response, he teaches her how to improve her technique as she leads.

=== Giving Up Smoking ===
Giving Up Smoking introduces Joanne, a lonely, middle-aged woman waiting to hear from Mel, her date for that evening. We are also introduced to Joanne's best friend Sherman, a lonely, middle-aged gay man waiting to hear from potential new boyfriend Gavin and Sherman's cancer-ridden but brightly optimistic mother Kathleen. One further introduction includes the guitar-strumming Mel, whose policy is to dump a woman before she becomes emotionally demanding.

The four characters discuss hopes and dreams, reminiscing about happier days in monologues that each character delivers from a separate area of the stage.

=== Swing Time ===
In Swing Time, Mitzi and her husband Darryl are preparing for the imminent arrival of old friends Gail and Ron. The nature of the evening is revealed when highly-strung Mitzi bemoans the fact her bra and panties do not match. The two couples are slowly easing themselves into the intended purpose of the evening when the phone rings and Mitzi refers to "the private line". Her friends' indignation at not being given the number, and Mitzi's increasingly complicated reasons why they were not given said number, disrupt the evening's plans in May's typically comic fashion.

== Production ==
After 39 previews, the Manhattan Theatre Club production, directed by Daniel Sullivan and choreographed by Randy Skinner, opened on June 1, 2005, at the Biltmore Theatre. Being hampered by mostly lukewarm reviews, with the Hollywood Reporter saying that the play "too often smacks of warmed-over humor". The play ran for 38 performances. The cast included Jeannie Berlin, Jere Burns, Brian Kerwin, J. Smith-Cameron, Joanna Glushak, Eddie Korbich, and Deirdre Madigan.
