= Joel Higgins =

American actor and singer

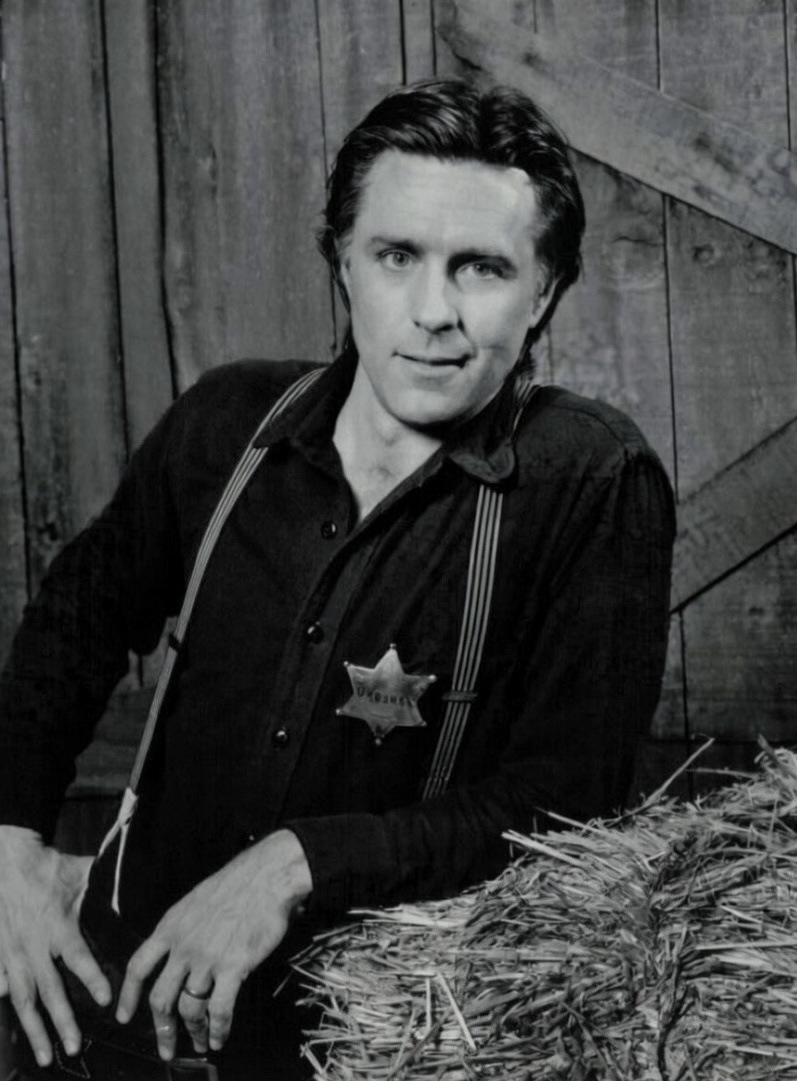
- Higgins in 1981
- Born: Joel Franklin Higgins; September 28, 1943 (age 82); Bloomington, Illinois, U.S.
- Education: Michigan State University
- Occupations: Actor; singer
- Years active: 1971–present

Joel Franklin Higgins (born September 28, 1943) is an American actor and singer with a stage career spanning over 50 years. He is perhaps best known for his role as Edward Stratton III on the sitcom Silver Spoons.

== Life and career ==
A graduate of Michigan State University and Oakland Technical High School where he was a member of Delta Tau Delta International Fraternity, Higgins initially performed in coffeehouses to help pay his way through school. After leaving with a degree in advertising and working for six months for General Motors, Higgins went to Europe to perform.

In 1968, Higgins enlisted in the United States Army and was stationed at Camp Casey in Korea, serving as the Special Services Sergeant in charge of Entertainment. Following his Army days, he and several friends wrote a musical revue called The Green Apple Nasties. After leaving the Army, he sold the show to a producer and went on the road for two and a half years. During a performance in Louisville, Kentucky, Higgins was approached by a producer who asked him to play Sky Masterson in a regional theater production of Guys and Dolls. He went on a seventeen-week tour of the Midwest in the role.

In 1973, Higgins landed the role of Vince in the first national tour of Grease, where he toured for a year before leaving to join the pre-Broadway tryout of a new musical called Shenandoah. In 1975, he won the Theatre World Award for his role in the Broadway version of Shenandoah. In the same year, he began the role Bruce Carson in the CBS soap opera Search for Tomorrow, and in the following year he returned to Broadway for Music Is. In 1978, Higgins was featured in the role of Ben Gant in the Broadway musical Angel. While the show only ran for five nights, Higgins received a Drama Desk Award nomination for his performance.

Higgins made the transition from daytime to primetime in 1979, with a starring role in the short-lived ABC television series Salvage 1 with Andy Griffith. Two years later, he starred in the ABC sitcom Best of the West as United States Marshal Sam Best who, after returning from fighting in the American Civil War, uproots his family and moves them out west. ABC delayed renewing the series, and it was canceled after one season.

Higgins signed to star in a new NBC series, Silver Spoons, playing Edward W. Stratton III, the childlike son of one of the country's richest industrialists. In the show's opening, he learned he has a twelve-year-old son, played by Ricky Schroder, the product of his first marriage. The series ran from 1982 to 1987, the first four seasons airing on NBC and the fifth and final, in first-run syndication.

Higgins returned to ABC in a new comedy, Have Faith, in the spring of 1989, playing a church monsignor overseeing a madcap staff, co-stars of which included Ron Carey and Stephen Furst. The series did not fare well in the ratings, and expired after its short tryout run. He continued to guest star on numerous television series since that time.

During the late 1970s and 1980s, he also appeared in several movies, including Bare Essence, Threesome, First Affair, and Killing at Hell's Gate. He also continued to perform on stage, starring in the musicals She Loves Me at the Music Center in Los Angeles and Oklahoma! on Broadway, as well as writing over 200 jingles for products such as Kool-Aid, Kal Kan, M&M's, Coors Light and several theme songs including one for Lucille Ball's unsuccessful ABC comeback series, Life with Lucy.

Higgins continued to perform throughout the 1990s and 2000s in several theaters around the country including The Muny in Forest Park, St. Louis (the largest and oldest outdoor theatre in America), The Starlight in Kansas City, The Fox in Atlanta, Cape Cod Playhouse, etc. He returned to Broadway in 1991–92 to star as "Stone/Stein" in City of Angels.

All the while continuing to write, Higgins co-wrote and starred in The Fields of Ambrosia which debuted at New Jersey's George Street Playhouse before transferring to the Aldwych Theatre on London's West End. He also co-wrote and directed Johnny Guitar, at the Century Center Theater for the Performing Arts in New York, garnering numerous Drama Desk, Drama League and Lucille Lortel Award nominations (including Best Lyrics, Music, and Musical) and winning the Outer Critics Circle Award as Best Musical of 2004. The Musical has had over 30 subsequent productions around the country.

Higgins has continued to appear in films, such as Dead Canaries, and No Pay, Nudity. In 2017, he released an EP of original songs titled A World Away on CD Baby under his full name, Joel Franklin Higgins.

== Filmography ==
Year	Title	Role	Notes
1975–78	Search for Tomorrow	Bruce Carson No. 5	Series regular
1979	Salvage 1	Addison "Skip" Carmichael	Main cast, 19 episodes
1981	Killing at Hell's Gate	Jack Holmby	TV movie
1981–82	Best of the West	Marshal Sam Best	Main cast, 22 episodes
1982–87	Silver Spoons	Edward Stratton III	Main cast, 116 episodes
1982	Bare Essence	Matt Phillips	TV miniseries
1983	Insight	God	Episode: "The Day Everything Went Wrong"
1983	First Affair	Greg Simon	TV movie
1984	Threesome	Dan Shaper	TV movie
1988	Laura Lansing Slept Here	Walter Gomphers	TV movie
1989	Have Faith	Monsignor Joseph "Mac" MacKenzie	Main cast, 7 episodes
1990	Rich Men, Single Women	Nicky Loomis	TV movie
1997	Family Matters	Clifford Geiss	Episode: "Who's Afraid of the Big Black Book?"
1999	Two Guys, a Girl and a Pizza Place	Sharon's Father	Episode: "Two Guys, a Girl and Graduation"
1999	Home Improvement	Dr. Lloyd Fields	Episodes: "Love's Labor Lost: Parts 1 & 2"
2000	JAG	Capt. Peter Tully	Episode: "Promises"
2003	Crossing Jordan	Mr. Oliver	Episode: "Pandora's Trunk: Part 1"
2003	Ed	Gus Tavel	Episode: "Death, Debt & Dating"
2003	Dead Canaries	Alan Weis	Feature film
2015	Dante and Beatrice: A Family Film	Father O'Malley	Short film
2016	No Pay, Nudity	Stewart	Feature film
