= Encores! =

Tony-honored theater series

Encores! is a Tony-honored theater series dedicated to reviving American musicals, usually with their original orchestrations. Presented by New York City Center since 1994, Encores! has revived shows by Irving Berlin, Rodgers & Hart, George and Ira Gershwin, Cole Porter, Leonard Bernstein, and Stephen Sondheim, among many others. Encores! was the brainchild of Judith Daykin, who launched the series shortly after becoming Executive Director of City Center in 1992. Besides initiating Encores!, Daykin is credited for turning City Center from a rental hall into a presenting organization. The series has spawned nineteen cast recordings and numerous Broadway transfers, including Kander and Ebb's Chicago, which is now the second longest-running musical in Broadway history. Videotapes of many Encores! productions are collected at the Billy Rose Theater Collection of the New York Public Library for the Performing Arts. The series was led by artistic director Jack Viertel from 2001 to 2020; in October 2019, City Center announced that Lear deBessonet will take over as artistic director beginning with the 2021 Encores! season. After deBessonet left, Jenny Gersten was named the artistic director in 2025.

From 2000 to 2001, City Center presented a short-lived sister series, Voices!, devoted to staged readings of infrequently-produced American plays and produced by Alec Baldwin. From 2007 to 2009, the spin-off series Encores! Summer Stars featured fully-staged productions of classic Broadway musicals, beginning with a production of Gypsy starring Patti LuPone, Boyd Gaines, and Laura Benanti. Gypsy received unprecedented attention for an Encores! show and eventually transferred to Broadway; LuPone, Gaines, and Benanti all won Tony Awards for their performances.

In 2013, City Center launched Encores! Off-Center!, a sister series devoted to groundbreaking Off-Broadway musicals. Led by founding artistic director Jeanine Tesori for its first four seasons, Encores! Off-Center was subsequently led by Michael Friedman (2017), Tesori and Anne Kauffman (2018), and Kauffman (2019–2020).

== Encores! Productions ==
	Title	Music	Lyrics	Book	Original Production	Encores! run	Stars
1	Fiorello!	Jerry Bock	Sheldon Harnick	Jerome Weidman and George Abbott	1959	February 9–12, 1994	Adam Arkin, Philip Bosco, Liz Callaway, Gregg Edelman, Donna McKechnie, Faith Prince, Jerry Zaks
2	Allegro	Richard Rodgers	Oscar Hammerstein II		1947	March 2–5, 1994	Stephen Bogardus, Christine Ebersole, Celeste Holm, Karen Ziemba
3	Lady in the Dark	Kurt Weill	Ira Gershwin	Moss Hart	1941	May 4–7, 1994	Patrick Cassidy, Christine Ebersole, Tony Goldwyn, Edward Hibbert, Carole Shelley
4	Call Me Madam	Irving Berlin		Howard Lindsay and Russell Crouse	1950	February 16–18, 1995^{CD}	Peter Bartlett, Walter Charles, Jane Connell, Tyne Daly, Christopher Durang, Melissa Errico, Ken Page
5	Out of This World	Cole Porter		Dwight Taylor and Reginald Lawrence	1950	March 30 – April 1, 1995^{CD}	LaChanze, Gregg Edelman, Andrea Martin, Marin Mazzie, Ken Page, Ernie Sabella, Peter Scolari
6	Pal Joey	Richard Rodgers	Lorenz Hart	John O'Hara	1940	May 4–6, 1995^{CD}	Peter Gallagher, Vicki Lewis, Patti LuPone, Bebe Neuwirth
7	DuBarry Was a Lady	Cole Porter		Herbert Fields and Buddy DeSylva	1939	February 15–17, 1996	Liz Larsen, Dick Latessa, Michael McGrath, Robert Morse, Burke Moses, Faith Prince, Donald Trump
8	One Touch of Venus	Kurt Weill	Ogden Nash	S. J. Perelman and Ogden Nash	1943	March 28–30, 1996	Kevin Chamberlin, Marilyn Cooper, Melissa Errico, David Alan Grier, Jane Krakowski, Danny Rutigliano
9	Chicago	John Kander	Fred Ebb	Bob Fosse and Fred Ebb	1975	May 2–4, 1996^{BWAY}	Michael Berresse, Joel Grey, Marcia Lewis, James Naughton, Bebe Neuwirth, Ann Reinking
10	Sweet Adeline	Jerome Kern	Oscar Hammerstein II		1929	February 13–16, 1997	Gary Beach, Stephen Bogardus, Patti Cohenour, Dorothy Loudon, Hugh Panaro, Tony Randall
11	Promises, Promises	Burt Bacharach	Hal David	Neil Simon	1968	March 20–23, 1997	Christine Baranski, Dick Latessa, Eugene Levy, Jenifer Lewis, Terrence Mann, Mike O'Malley, Martin Short, Samuel E. Wright
12	The Boys from Syracuse	Richard Rodgers	Lorenz Hart	George Abbott	1938	May 1–4, 1997^{CD}	Sarah Uriarte Berry, Danny Burstein, Mario Cantone, Davis Gaines, Malcolm Gets, Debbie Gravitte, Rebecca Luker, Michael McGrath, Marian Seldes
13	Strike up the Band	George Gershwin	Ira Gershwin	Morrie Ryskind	1927	February 12–15, 1998	Philip Bosco, Kristin Chenoweth, Jason Danieley, Judy Kuhn, Lynn Redgrave
14	Li'l Abner	Gene De Paul	Johnny Mercer	Norman Panama and Melvin Frank	1959	March 26–30, 1998	Danny Burstein, Lea DeLaria, Katie Finneran, Jonathan Freeman, Cady Huffman, Dana Ivey, Dick Latessa, Burke Moses, Julie Newmar, Alice Ripley, David Ogden Stiers
15	St. Louis Woman	Harold Arlen	Johnny Mercer	Arna Bontemps and Countee Cullen	1946	April 30 – May 3, 1998^{CD}	Charles S. Dutton, Stanley Wayne Mathis, Wendell Pierce, Vanessa Williams
16	Babes in Arms	Richard Rodgers	Lorenz Hart	Richard Rodgers and Lorenz Hart	1937	February 11–14, 1999^{CD}	Kevin Cahoon, David Campbell, Don Correia, Erin Dilly, Christopher Fitzgerald, Priscilla Lopez, Donna McKechnie, Thommie Walsh
17	Ziegfeld Follies of 1936	Vernon Duke	Ira Gershwin	Ira Gershwin and David Freedman	1936	March 25–29, 1999^{CD}	Kevin Chamberlin, Christine Ebersole, Ruthie Henshall, Peter Scolari, Mary Testa, Karen Ziemba
18	Do Re Mi	Jule Styne	Betty Comden and Adolph Green	Garson Kanin	1960	May 6–9, 1999^{CD}	Marilyn Cooper, Tovah Feldshuh, Randy Graff, Heather Headley, Nathan Lane, Brian Stokes Mitchell, Brad Oscar
19	On a Clear Day You Can See Forever	Burton Lane	Alan Jay Lerner		1965	February 10–13, 2000	Brooks Ashmanskas, Brent Barrett, Roger Bart, Kristin Chenoweth, Peter Friedman, Nancy Opel, Louis Zorich
20	Tenderloin	Jerry Bock	Sheldon Harnick	George Abbott and Jerome Weidman	1960	March 23–27, 2000^{CD}	Sarah Uriarte Berry, Debbie Gravitte, David Ogden Stiers, Patrick Wilson
21	Wonderful Town	Leonard Bernstein	Betty Comden and Adolph Green	Joseph Fields and Jerome Chodorov	1953	May 3–7, 2000^{BWAY}	David Aaron Baker, Laura Benanti, Stephen DeRosa, Gregory Jbara, Donna Murphy
22	A Connecticut Yankee	Richard Rodgers	Lorenz Hart	Herbert Fields	1927	February 8–11, 2001	Christine Ebersole, Henry Gibson, Ron Leibman, Jessica Walter
23	Bloomer Girl	Harold Arlen	E.Y. Harburg	Sig Herzig and Fred Saidy	1944	March 22–25, 2001	Philip Bosco, Kathleen Chalfant, Donna Lynne Champlin, Anita Gillette, Kate Jennings Grant, Michael Park, Jubilant Sykes
24	Hair	Galt MacDermot	Gerome Ragni and James Rado		1967	May 3–7, 2001	Kevin Cahoon, Luther Creek, Gavin Creel, Jesse Tyler Ferguson, Brandi Chavonne Massey, Idina Menzel, Miriam Shor
25	Carnival!	Bob Merrill		Michael Stewart	1961	February 7–10, 2002	Debbie Gravitte, Anne Hathaway, David Margulies, Brian Stokes Mitchell, Douglas Sills
26	Golden Boy	Charles Strouse	Lee Adams	Clifford Odets and William Gibson	1964	March 21–24, 2002	Anastasia Barzee, Norm Lewis, Alfonso Ribeiro
27	The Pajama Game	Richard Adler and Jerry Ross		George Abbott and Richard Bissell	1954	May 2–6, 2002	Mark Linn-Baker, Brent Barrett, Deidre Goodwin, Daniel Jenkins, Ken Page, Karen Ziemba
28	House of Flowers	Harold Arlen	Harold Arlen and Truman Capote	Truman Capote	1954	February 13–16, 2003	Roscoe Lee Browne, Brandon Victor Dixon, Stacy Francis, Maurice Hines, Nikki M. James, Armelia McQueen, Tonya Pinkins
29	The New Moon	Sigmund Romberg	Oscar Hammerstein II	Oscar Hammerstein II, Frank Mandel, and Laurence Schwab	1928	March 27–30, 2003^{CD}	F. Murray Abraham, Rod Gilfry, Simon Jones, Brandon Jovanovich, Burke Moses, Christiane Noll, Danny Rutigliano, Lauren Ward
30	No Strings	Richard Rodgers		Samuel A. Taylor	1962	May 8–11, 2003	Len Cariou, Penny Fuller, Marc Kudisch, James Naughton, Emily Skinner
31	Can-Can	Cole Porter		Abe Burrows	1953	February 12–15, 2004	Charlotte d'Amboise, Patti LuPone, Michael Nouri, Reg Rogers, Eli Wallach
32	Pardon My English	George Gershwin	Ira Gershwin	Herbert Fields and Morrie Ryskind	1933	March 25–28, 2004	Rob Bartlett, Brian d'Arcy James, Emily Skinner, Don Stephenson, Jennifer Laura Thompson
33	Bye Bye Birdie	Charles Strouse	Lee Adams	Michael Stewart	1960	May 6–9, 2004	Walter Bobbie, Victoria Clark, Jessica Grové, Daniel Jenkins, Keith Nobbs, Doris Roberts, Karen Ziemba
34	A Tree Grows in Brooklyn	Arthur Schwartz	Dorothy Fields	George Abbott and Betty Smith	1951	February 10–13, 2005	Jason Danieley, Emily Skinner
35	Purlie	Gary Geld	Peter Udell	Ossie Davis, Philip Rose, and Peter Udell	1970	March 31 – April 3, 2005	John Cullum, Doug E. Doug, Anika Noni Rose, Blair Underwood, Lillias White
36	The Apple Tree	Jerry Bock	Sheldon Harnick	Jerry Bock, Sheldon Harnick, and Jerome Coopersmith	1966	May 12–16, 2005^{BWAY}	Michael Cerveris, Kristin Chenoweth, Malcolm Gets, James Earl Jones (voice only), Tony Yazbeck
37	Kismet	Robert Wright and George Forrest, adapting themes by Alexander Borodin	Robert Wright and George Forrest	Charles Lederer and Luther Davis	1953	February 9–12, 2006	Tom Aldredge, Danny Gurwin, Marcy Harriell, Randall Duk Kim, Marin Mazzie, Brian Stokes Mitchell, Danny Rutigliano
38	70, Girls, 70	John Kander	Fred Ebb	Fred Ebb, Norman L. Martin, and Joe Masteroff	1971	March 30 – April 2, 2006	Carleton Carpenter, Ronn Carroll, Mary Jo Catlett, Carole Cook, Bob Dishy, Olympia Dukakis, Anita Gillette, George S. Irving, Charlotte Rae
39	Of Thee I Sing	George Gershwin	Ira Gershwin	George S. Kaufman and Morrie Ryskind	1931	May 11–15, 2006	Wayne Duvall, Jonathan Freeman, Victor Garber, Jefferson Mays, Jenny Powers, Lewis J. Stadlen, Jennifer Laura Thompson
40	Follies	Stephen Sondheim		James Goldman	1971	February 8–11, 2007	Christine Baranski, Philip Bosco, Victoria Clark, Yvonne Constant, Colin Donnell, Victor Garber, Mimi Hines, Michael McGrath, Donna Murphy, Jenny Powers, Jo Anne Worley
41	Face the Music	Irving Berlin		Moss Hart	1932	March 29 – April 1, 2007^{CD}	Walter Bobbie, Judy Kaye, Meredith Patterson, Lee Wilkof
42	Stairway to Paradise	Various				May 10–14, 2007	Kristin Chenoweth, Christopher Fitzgerald, Jennifer Gambatese, Michael Gruber, Ruthie Henshall, Capathia Jenkins
43	Applause	Charles Strouse	Lee Adams	Betty Comden and Adolph Green	1970	February 7–10, 2008	Kate Burton, Mario Cantone, Erin Davie, Christine Ebersole, Tom Hewitt, Michael Park, Chip Zien
44	Juno	Marc Blitzstein		Joseph Stein	1959	March 27–30, 2008	Michael Arden, Victoria Clark, Tyler Hanes, Celia Keenan-Bolger, Rosaleen Linehan
45	No, No, Nanette	Vincent Youmans	Irving Caesar and Otto Harbach	Otto Harbach and Frank Mandel, adapted by Burt Shevelove	1925 (revised 1971)	May 8–12, 2008	Michael Berresse, Mara Davi, Sandy Duncan, Charles Kimbrough, Beth Leavel, Rosie O'Donnell
46	On the Town	Leonard Bernstein	Betty Comden and Adolph Green		1945	November 19–23, 2008	Christian Borle, Jessica Lee Goldyn, Leslie Kritzer, Andrea Martin, Jennifer Laura Thompson, Tony Yazbeck
47	Music in the Air	Jerome Kern	Oscar Hammerstein II		1932	February 5–8, 2009	Sierra Boggess, Walter Charles, Kristin Chenoweth, Dick Latessa, Marni Nixon, Douglas Sills
48	Finian's Rainbow	Burton Lane	E.Y. Harburg	E.Y. Harburg and Fred Saidy	1947	March 26–29, 2009^{BWAY}	Kate Baldwin, Jeremy Bobb, Philip Bosco, Christopher Fitzgerald, Cheyenne Jackson, Jim Norton, Ruben Santiago-Hudson
49	Girl Crazy	George Gershwin	Ira Gershwin	Guy Bolton and John McGowan	1930	November 19–22, 2009	Chris Diamantopoulos, Ana Gasteyer, Wayne Knight, Becki Newton
50	Fanny	Harold Rome		S. N. Behrman and Joshua Logan	1954	February 4–7, 2010	George Hearn, Priscilla Lopez, Elena Shaddow, James Snyder
51	Anyone Can Whistle	Stephen Sondheim		Arthur Laurents	1964	April 8–11, 2010	Raúl Esparza, Sutton Foster, Edward Hibbert, Donna Murphy
52	Bells Are Ringing	Jule Styne	Betty Comden and Adolph Green		1956	November 18–21, 2010	Bobby Cannavale, Will Chase, Judy Kaye, Kelli O'Hara, Brad Oscar, Danny Rutigliano
53	Lost in the Stars	Kurt Weill	Maxwell Anderson		1949	February 3–6, 2011	Daniel Breaker, Chuck Cooper, Patina Miller
54	Where's Charley?	Frank Loesser		George Abbott	1948	March 17–20, 2011	Sebastian Arcelus, Rebecca Luker, Rob McClure, Howard McGillin, Jill Paice, Lauren Worsham
55	Merrily We Roll Along	Stephen Sondheim		George Furth	1981	February 8–19, 2012^{CD}	Colin Donnell, Celia Keenan-Bolger, Lin-Manuel Miranda, Betsy Wolfe
56	Pipe Dream	Richard Rodgers	Oscar Hammerstein II		1955	March 28 – April 1, 2012^{CD}	Will Chase, Laura Osnes, Leslie Uggams, Stephen Wallem, Tom Wopat
57	Gentlemen Prefer Blondes	Jule Styne	Leo Robin	Joseph Fields and Anita Loos	1949	May 9–13, 2012^{CD}	Megan Hilty, Rachel York, Aaron Lazar, Clarke Thorell, Stephen R. Buntrock
58	Fiorello!	Jerry Bock	Sheldon Harnick	Jerome Weidman and George Abbott	1959	January 30 – February 3, 2013	Kate Baldwin, Jeremy Bobb, Erin Dilly, Jennifer Gambatese, Shuler Hensley, Danny Rutigliano, Emily Skinner
59	It's a Bird... It's a Plane... It's Superman	Charles Strouse	Lee Adams	Robert Benton and David Newman	1966	March 20–24, 2013	Alli Mauzey, David Pittu, Jenny Powers, Will Swenson, Edward Watts
60	On Your Toes	Richard Rodgers	Lorenz Hart	Richard Rodgers, Lorenz Hart, and George Abbott	1936	May 8–12, 2013	Christine Baranski, Walter Bobbie, Joaquín De Luz, Irina Dvorovenko, Randy Skinner, Karen Ziemba
61	Little Me	Cy Coleman	Carolyn Leigh	Neil Simon	1962	February 5–9, 2014	Christian Borle, David Garrison, Judy Kaye, Lewis J. Stadlen, Lee Wilkof, Rachel York
62	The Most Happy Fella	Frank Loesser			1956	April 2–6, 2014	Laura Benanti, Heidi Blickenstaff, Shuler Hensley, Cheyenne Jackson, Jay Armstrong Johnson, Jessica Molaskey
63	Irma La Douce	Marguerite Monnot	Alexandre Breffort; English version by Julian More, David Heneker, and Monty Norman		1956 (translated 1958)	May 7–11, 2014	Malcolm Gets, Rob McClure
64	Lady, Be Good!	George Gershwin	Ira Gershwin	Guy Bolton and Fred Thompson	1924	February 4–8, 2015^{CD}	Colin Donnell, Patti Murin, Erin Mackey, Douglas Sills, Jennifer Laura Thompson, Tommy Tune
65	Paint Your Wagon	Frederick Loewe	Alan Jay Lerner		1951	March 18–22, 2015^{CD}	Keith Carradine, Justin Guarini, Alexandra Socha
66	Zorba!	John Kander	Fred Ebb	Joseph Stein	1968	May 6–10, 2015	Adam Chanler-Berat, Santino Fontana, Marin Mazzie, John Turturro, Zoë Wanamaker
67	Cabin in the Sky	Vernon Duke	John Latouche	Lynn Root	1940	February 10–14, 2016	Chuck Cooper. Marva Hicks, LaChanze, Norm Lewis, Michael Potts
68	1776	Sherman Edwards		Peter Stone	1969	March 30 – April 3, 2016	John Behlmann, André De Shields, Santino Fontana, Alexander Gemignani, John Larroquette, Christiane Noll, Bryce Pinkham, Jubilant Sykes
69	Do I Hear a Waltz?	Richard Rodgers	Stephen Sondheim	Arthur Laurents	1965	May 11–15, 2016	Claybourne Elder, Melissa Errico, Nancy Opel, Karen Ziemba
70	Big River	Roger Miller		William Hauptman	1985	February 8–12, 2017	Annie Golden, Kyle Scatliffe, Christopher Sieber, Lauren Worsham
71	The New Yorkers	Cole Porter		Herbert Fields	1930	March 22–26, 2017	Kevin Chamberlin, Scarlett Strallen
72	The Golden Apple	Jerome Moross	John Latouche		1954	May 10–14, 2017	Ashley Brown, Lindsay Mendez
73	Hey, Look Me Over!	Various				February 7–11, 2018	Vanessa Williams, Carolee Carmello, Judy Kuhn, Marc Kudisch, Reed Birney, Bebe Neuwirth, Nancy Opel, Douglas Sills, Alexandra Socha
74	Grand Hotel	Robert Wright, George Forrest, and Maury Yeston		Luther Davis	1989	March 21–25, 2018	Brandon Uranowitz, Heléne Yorke, James Snyder, Irina Dvorovenko, John Dossett
75	Me and My Girl	Noel Gay	Douglas Furber and L. Arthur Rose	Douglas Furber and L. Arthur Rose, revised by Stephen Fry and Mike Ockrent	1937 (revised 1984)	May 9–13, 2018	Christian Borle, Laura Michelle Kelly, Harriet Harris, Edward Hibbert
76	Call Me Madam	Irving Berlin		Howard Lindsay and Russell Crouse	1950	February 6–10, 2019	Carmen Cusack, Darrell Hammond, Carol Kane, Lauren Worsham
77	I Married an Angel	Richard Rodgers	Lorenz Hart	Richard Rodgers and Lorenz Hart	1938	March 20–24, 2019	Mark Evans, Ann Harada, Nikki M. James, Sara Mearns
78	High Button Shoes	Jule Styne	Sammy Cahn	George Abbott and Stephen Longstreet	1947	May 8–12, 2019	Kevin Chamberlin, Michael Urie, Betsy Wolfe
79	Mack and Mabel	Jerry Herman		Michael Stewart	1974	February 19–23, 2020	Lilli Cooper, Douglas Sills, Alexandra Socha
80	The Tap Dance Kid	Henry Krieger	Robert Lorick	Charles Blackwell	1983	February 2–6, 2022	Alexander Bello, Joshua Henry, Shahadi Wright Joseph, Trevor Jackson
81	The Life	Cy Coleman	Ira Gasman	David Newman, Cy Coleman, and Ira Gasman	1997	March 16–20, 2022	Alexandra Grey, Antwayn Hopper, Ledisi
82	Into the Woods	Stephen Sondheim		James Lapine	1987	May 4–15, 2022^{BWAY}	Sara Bareilles, Denée Benton, Gavin Creel, Jordan Donica, Annie Golden, Ann Harada, Neil Patrick Harris, Heather Headley, David Patrick Kelly, Julia Lester, Shereen Pimentel
83	Dear World	Jerry Herman		Jerome Lawrence and Robert E. Lee	1969	March 15–19, 2023	Donna Murphy, Brooks Ashmanskas, Andréa Burns, Christopher Fitzgerald, Ann Harada, Kody Jauron, Phillip Johnson Richardson, Samantha Williams
84	Oliver!	Lionel Bart			1960	May 3–14, 2023	Raúl Esparza, Lilli Cooper, Tam Mutu, Brad Oscar, Benjamin Pajak, Mary Testa, Julian Lerner, Michael Siberry
85	The Light in the Piazza	Adam Guettel		Craig Lucas	2005	June 21–25, 2023	Ruthie Ann Miles, Anna Zavelson, James D. Gish, Ivan Hernandez, Andréa Burns, Shereen Ahmed, Rodd Cyrus
86	Once Upon a Mattress	Mary Rodgers	Marshall Barer	Jay Thompson, Dean Fuller, and Marshall Barer	1959	January 21–28, 2024^{BWAY}	Sutton Foster, Michael Urie, Nikki Renée Daniels, Cheyenne Jackson, Harriet Harris, J. Harrison Ghee, David Patrick Kelly, Francis Jue
87	Jelly's Last Jam	Jelly Roll Morton and Luther Henderson	Susan Birkenhead	George C. Wolfe	1992	February 21–25, 2024	Nicholas Christopher, John Clay III, Joaquina Kalukango, Tiffany Mann, Billy Porter, Leslie Uggams, Okieriete Onaodowan, Alaman Diadhiou
88	Titanic	Maury Yeston		Peter Stone	1997	June 12–16, 2024	Bonnie Milligan, Chuck Cooper, Eddie Cooper, Drew Gehling, Ramin Karimloo, Emilie Kouatchou, Judy Kuhn, Brandon Uranowitz, Samantha Williams, Chip Zien
89	Urinetown	Mark Hollmann	Mark Hollmann and Greg Kotis	Greg Kotis	2001	February 5–16, 2025	Jordan Fisher, Rainn Wilson, Stephanie Styles, Keala Settle
90	Love Life	Kurt Weill	Alan Jay Lerner		1948	March 26—30, 2025	Kate Baldwin, Brian Stokes Mitchell
91	Wonderful Town	Leonard Bernstein	Betty Comden and Adolph Green	Joseph Fields and Jerome Chodorov	1953	April 30–May 11, 2025	Anika Noni Rose, Aisha Jackson
92	High Spirits	Hugh Martin and Timothy Gray			1964	February 4–15, 2026	Katrina Lenk, Andrea Martin, Steven Pasquale, Phillipa Soo
93	The Wild Party	Michael John LaChiusa		Michael John LaChiusa and George C. Wolfe	2000	March 18–29, 2026	Jelani Alladin, Jordan Donica, Tonya Pinkins, Jasmine Amy Rogers, Adrienne Warren
94	La Cage aux Folles	Jerry Herman		Harvey Fierstein	1983	June 17–28, 2026	Billy Porter, Wayne Brady
95	You're a Good Man, Charlie Brown	Clark Gesner			1967	February 3-14, 2027	David Hyde Pierce, Ayo Edebiri, Danielle Brooks, Jin Ha, Rachel Dratch, Jeff Hiller
96	Let 'Em Eat Cake	George Gershwin	Ira Gershwin	George S. Kaufman and Morrie Ryskind	1933	March 17-28, 2027	TBA
97	Kiss of the Spider Woman	John Kander	Fred Ebb	Terrence McNally	1992	April 28-May 9, 2027	TBA

Two productions scheduled for spring 2020 were canceled due to the COVID-19 pandemic: the 1948 musical Love Life (eventually rescheduled to 2025) and a revised version of the 2002 Jeanine Tesori and Dick Scanlan musical Thoroughly Modern Millie led by Ashley Park.

== Voices! ==
	Title	Playwright	Year	Voices! Run	Stars
1	Arsenic and Old Lace	Joseph Kesselring	1941	November 11, 2000	Alec Baldwin, Celeste Holm, Joanne Woodward
2	Little Murders	Jules Feiffer	1967	January 30, 2001	Blythe Danner, Jules Feiffer, Christopher Fitzgerald, Joel Grey
3	The Devil and Daniel Webster	Stephen Vincent Benét	1939	March 13, 2001	Eric Bogosian, James Naughton

== Encores! Summer Stars ==
	Title	Music	Lyrics	Book	Year	Encores! Summer Stars Run	Stars
1	Gypsy	Jule Styne	Stephen Sondheim	Arthur Laurents	1959	July 9–29, 2007^{BWAY}	Laura Benanti, Alison Fraser, Boyd Gaines, Leigh Ann Larkin, Patti LuPone, Nancy Opel, Tony Yazbeck
2	Damn Yankees	Richard Adler and Jerry Ross		George Abbott and Douglass Wallop	1955	July 5–27, 2008	Randy Graff, Sean Hayes, Cheyenne Jackson, Jane Krakowski, Megan Lawrence, Michael Mulheren
3	The Wiz	Charlie Smalls		William F. Brown	1975	June 12 – July 5, 2009	Tichina Arnold, Ashanti, Joshua Henry, James Monroe Iglehart, Orlando Jones, LaChanze, Dawnn Lewis

== Encores! Off-Center ==
	Title	Music	Lyrics	Book	Year	Encores! Off-Center Run	Stars
1	The Cradle Will Rock	Marc Blitzstein			1937	July 10–13, 2013	Danny Burstein, Raúl Esparza, Judy Kuhn, David Margulies, Da'Vine Joy Randolph, Anika Noni Rose
2	Violet	Jeanine Tesori	Brian Crawley		1997	July 17, 2013^{BWAY}	Sutton Foster, Joshua Henry, Christopher Sieber
3	I'm Getting My Act Together...	Nancy Ford	Gretchen Cryer		1978	July 24–27, 2013	Renée Elise Goldsberry
4	Tick, Tick... Boom!	Jonathan Larson		Jonathan Larson, adapted by David Auburn	2001	June 25–28, 2014	Lin-Manuel Miranda, Leslie Odom Jr., Karen Olivo
5	Randy Newman's Faust	Randy Newman			1995	July 1, 2014	Michael Cerveris, Randy Newman, Laura Osnes, Vonda Shepard, Tony Vincent
6	Pump Boys and Dinettes	John Foley, Mark Hardwick, Debra Monk, Cass Morgan, John Schimmel and Jim Wann			1981	July 16–19, 2014	Hunter Foster, Mamie Parris, Randy Redd, Katie Thompson, Jordan Dean
7	A New Brain	William Finn		William Finn and James Lapine	1997	June 24–27, 2015^{CD}	Dan Fogler, Ana Gasteyer, Jonathan Groff, Aaron Lazar
8	Little Shop of Horrors	Alan Menken	Howard Ashman		1982	July 1–2, 2015	Ellen Greene, Jake Gyllenhaal, Marva Hicks, Taran Killam
9	The Wild Party	Andrew Lippa			2000	July 15–18, 2015	Brandon Victor Dixon, Sutton Foster, Joaquina Kalukango, Steven Pasquale, Miriam Shor
10	Runaways	Elizabeth Swados			1978	July 6–9, 2016	Sophia Anne Caruso, Mj Rodriguez
11	Off-Center Jamboree	Various				July 16, 2016	Sutton Foster, Jonathan Groff
12	God Bless You, Mr. Rosewater	Alan Menken	Howard Ashman and Dennis Green	Howard Ashman	1979	July 27–30, 2016^{CD}	Skylar Astin, Santino Fontana, James Earl Jones
13	Assassins	Stephen Sondheim		John Weidman	1990	July 12–15, 2017	Steven Boyer, Alex Brightman, Victoria Clark, Shuler Hensley, Steven Pasquale
14	The Bubbly Black Girl Sheds Her Chameleon Skin	Kirsten Childs			2000	July 26–27, 2017	Nikki M. James
15	Really Rosie	Carole King	Maurice Sendak		1980	August 2–5, 2017	Taylor Caldwell
16	Songs for a New World	Jason Robert Brown			1995	June 27–30, 2018^{CD}	Shoshana Bean, Colin Donnell, Mykal Kilgore, Solea Pfeiffer
17	Gone Missing	Michael Friedman		Steve Cosson	2003	July 11–12, 2018	Taylor Mac
18	Don't Bother Me, I Can't Cope	Micki Grant			1971	July 25–28, 2018	
19	Working	Various	Various	Stephen Schwartz and Nina Faso	1978	June 26–29, 2019	Helen Hunt, Christopher Jackson, Javier Muñoz, Tracie Thoms
20	Promenade	Al Carmines	María Irene Fornés		1965	July 10–11, 2019	
21	Road Show	Stephen Sondheim		John Weidman	2008	July 24–27, 2019	Raúl Esparza, Brandon Uranowitz

== Special Events ==
	Title	Music	Lyrics	Book	Year	Run	Stars
1	Cotton Club Parade	Various				November 18–22, 2011^{BWAY}	
2	A Bed and A Chair	Stephen Sondheim				November 13–17, 2013	Jeremy Jordan, Norm Lewis, Bernadette Peters
3	The Band Wagon	Arthur Schwartz	Howard Dietz	Douglas Carter Beane	1931	November 6–16, 2014	Michael Berresse, Michael McKean, Brian Stokes Mitchell, Laura Osnes, Tony Sheldon, Tracey Ullman
4	Annie Get Your Gun	Irving Berlin		Dorothy Fields and Herbert Fields	1946	October 27–28, 2015	Megan Hilty, Andy Karl, Judy Kaye, Brad Oscar, Ron Raines
5	Sunday in the Park with George	Stephen Sondheim		James Lapine	1984	October 24–26, 2016^{BWAY}	Annaleigh Ashford, Carmen Cusack, Jake Gyllenhaal, Phylicia Rashad
6	Brigadoon	Frederick Loewe	Alan Jay Lerner		1947	November 15–19, 2017^{CD}	Stephanie J. Block, Robert Fairchild, Aasif Mandvi, Kelli O'Hara, Patrick Wilson
7	A Chorus Line	Marvin Hamlisch	Edward Kleban	James Kirkwood Jr. and Nicholas Dante	1975	November 14–18, 2018	Jay Armstrong Johnson, Robyn Hurder, Tony Yazbeck
8	Evita	Andrew Lloyd Webber	Tim Rice		1978	November 13–24, 2019	Enrique Acevedo, Jason Gotay, Solea Pfeiffer
9	Parade	Jason Robert Brown		Alfred Uhry	1998	November 1–6, 2022 ^{BWAY}	Ben Platt, Micaela Diamond, Gaten Matarazzo
10	Pal Joey	Richard Rodgers	Lorenz Hart	Richard LaGravenese and Daniel "Koa" Beaty		November 1–5, 2023	Brooks Ashmanskas, Jennifer Holliday, Aisha Jackson, Elizabeth Stanley, Ephraim Sykes
11	Ragtime	Stephen Flaherty	Lynn Ahrens	Terrence McNally	1996	October 30–November 10, 2024^{BWAY}	Joshua Henry, Caissie Levy, Brandon Uranowitz
12	Bat Boy	Laurence O'Keefe		Keythe Farley and Brian Flemming	2001	October 29–November 9, 2025^{CD}	Kerry Butler, Andrew Durand, Mary Faber, Alex Newell, Christopher Sieber, Taylor Trensch, Marissa Jaret Winokur
13	In the Heights	Lin-Manuel Miranda		Quiara Alegría Hudes	2008	October 28-November 15, 2026	TBA

Notes

^BWAYTransferred to Broadway.
^CDReceived a cast recording.
