= Meredith Patterson =

American actress

- Born: Meredith Ann Patterson; November 24, 1975 (age 49); Concord, California, U.S.
- Occupation: Actress
- Years active: 2000–present
- Spouse: Dustin Brayley (m. 2012)
- Children: 2

Meredith Ann Patterson (born November 24, 1975) is an American musical theatre and television actress. She is best known for her Broadway performances such as Peggy Sawyer in 2001 Revival of "42nd Street", The Boy Friend, and White Christmas, as well as her television and film work.

== Early life ==
She is the youngest of four children. She graduated from College Park High School in 1993. She toured the country at 17 as a teacher for The Universal Dance Association. At the age of 18, Patterson relocated to New York City to pursue a career as a dancer on Broadway.

== Filmography ==
Film roles
| Year | Title | Role | Notes |
|---|---|---|---|
| 2000 | Company Man | Marilyn Monroe | |
| 2004 | The Princess Diaries 2: Royal Engagement | Lady Elissa | |
| 2005 | Broken Flowers | Flight Attendant | |
| 2007 | Before the Devil Knows You're Dead | Andy's Secretary | |
| 2009 | My Father's Will | Kat Curtis | |
| 2017 | What If Wendy | Dr. Mara Stevens | Short film |

Television roles
| Year | Title | Role | Notes |
|---|---|---|---|
| 2001 | Late Show with David Letterman | Performer | Episode: "Episode dated 20 September 2001" |
| 2003 | Last Laugh | Olga | Television film |
| 2006–08 | Boston Legal | Missy Tiggs / Missy Frank | 4 episodes |
| 2007 | The Guiding Light | Melinda | 3 episodes |
| 2009 | All My Children | Francesca | 25 episodes |
| 2010 | Law & Order: Special Victims Unit | Joyce Dixon | Episode: "Branded" |
| 2011 | Person of Interest | Angela Markham | Episode: "Judgement" |
| 2012 | The Good Wife | Jennifer | Episode: "Waiting for the Knock" |
| 2012 | Made in Jersey | Sarah Jenkins | Episode: "Ancient History" |
