= Company (2011 film) =

- Directed by: Lonny Price
- Written by: George Furth; Stephen Sondheim
- Based on: Company by Stephen Sondheim; George Furth
- Produced by: Bonnie Comley; Matt Cowart; Stewart Lane; Malin Yhr; Lonny Price
- Starring: Neil Patrick Harris; Martha Plimpton; Stephen Colbert; Jill Paice; Craig Bierko; Jennifer Laura Thompson; Jon Cryer; Katie Finneran; Aaron Lazar; Patti LuPone; Jim Walton; Christina Hendricks; Anika Noni Rose; Chryssie Whitehead
- Edited by: Gary Bradley
- Music by: Stephen Sondheim
- Production companies: Screenvision; Ellen M. Krass Productions; NCM Fathom; New York Philharmonic
- Distributed by: Screenvision
- Release date: June 15, 2011
- Country: United States
- Language: English

Company is a 2011 filmed version of the 1970 musical of the same name by Stephen Sondheim and George Furth. The production is directed by Lonny Price and accompanied by the New York Philharmonic, conducted by Paul Gemignani. It was filmed live at Avery Fisher Hall in Lincoln Center. The show stars an ensemble cast led by Neil Patrick Harris. It also stars Martha Plimpton, Stephen Colbert, Jill Paice, Craig Bierko, Jennifer Laura Thompson, Jon Cryer, Katie Finneran, Aaron Lazar, Patti LuPone, Jim Walton, Christina Hendricks, Anika Noni Rose, and Chryssie Whitehead. It had a limited theatrical release that began on June 15, 2011.

== Plot ==
=== Act I ===
Robert is a well-liked single man living in New York City, whose friends are all married or engaged couples. When Robert fails to blow out any candles on his 35th birthday cake, the couples promise him that his birthday wish will still come true, though he has wished for nothing, since his friends are all that he needs ("Company"). What follows is a series of disconnected vignettes in no apparent order, each featuring Robert during a visit with one of the couples or alone with a girlfriend.

Robert visits foodie Sarah and her husband, the alcoholic Harry. Sarah and Harry taunt each other on their vices, escalating toward karate-like fighting and thrashing that may or may not be playful. The caustic Joanne comments that it is "The Little Things You Do Together" that make a marriage work. Harry explains that a person is always "Sorry-Grateful" about getting married, and that marriage changes both everything and nothing about the way they live.

Robert is next with Peter and Susan, who surprise Robert with the news of their upcoming divorce. At the home of the uptight Jenny and chic David, Robert has brought along some marijuana that they share. The couple turns to grilling Robert on why he has not yet gotten married. Robert claims he is not against the notion, but three women he is currently sleeping with appear and chastise Robert for his reluctance to being committed ("You Could Drive a Person Crazy").

All of Robert's male friends envy his commitment-free status, and each has found someone they find perfect for Robert ("Have I Got a Girl for You"), but Robert is waiting for someone who merges the best features of all his married female friends ("Someone Is Waiting"). Robert meets his three girlfriends in a small park on three occasions, as Marta sings of the city ("Another Hundred People"). Robert first gets to know April, a slow-witted airline flight attendant. Robert then spends time with Kathy, who reveals that she is leaving for Cape Cod with a new fiancé. Finally, Robert meets with Marta, who leaves Robert stunned with her irrelevant chatter about New York.

The scene turns to the day of Amy and Paul's wedding. Robert, the best man, and Paul watch as Amy complains and self-destructs over every petty thing she can possibly think of and finally calls off the wedding ("Getting Married Today"). Robert tries to comfort Amy, but winds up offering an impromptu proposal to her himself ("What Did I Just Do?"). His words jolt Amy back into reality, and she runs out after Paul, at last ready to marry him.

The setting returns to the Robert's birthday party, where Robert wishes for someone to "Marry Me a Little".

=== Act II ===
The birthday party scene is reset, and Robert goes to blow out his candles. This time, he gets them about half out, and the rest have to help him. The couples share their views on Robert with each other as Robert reflects on being the third wheel ("Side By Side By Side" & "What Would We Do Without You?").

Robert brings April to his apartment for a nightcap, after a date. Meanwhile, the married women worry about Robert's single status ("Poor Baby"). When the inevitable sex happens, we hear Robert's and April's thoughts ("Tick-Tock"). The next morning, April rises early, to report for duty aboard a flight to "Barcelona". Robert wavers between asking her to stay and telling her to leave. April takes Bobby by surprise when she declares that she will stay.

Robert takes Marta to visit Peter and Susan, now divorced but still living together. Susan takes Marta inside to make lunch, and Peter asks Robert if he has ever had a homosexual experience. They both admit they have, and Peter hints at the possibility that he and Robert could have such an encounter. Robert uncomfortably laughs the conversation off as a joke, just as the women return.

Joanne and Larry take Robert out to a nightclub. Joanne blames Robert for always watching life rather than living it. She raises her glass in a mocking toast to "The Ladies Who Lunch". When Larry leaves to pay the check, Joanne bluntly invites Robert to begin an affair with her, assuring him that she will "take care of him". Bobby asks, "But who will I take care of?" Bobby confronts his own gnawing loneliness, realizing that he does need someone in his life after all ("Being Alive").

The opening party resets a final time; Robert's friends have waited two hours, with still no sign of him. At last, they all prepare to leave, expressing a new hopefulness about their absent friend's chances for loving fulfillment, and wishing him a happy birthday, wherever he may be. After they exit, Robert emerges from hiding and contentedly sits on his couch.

== Cast ==
- Neil Patrick Harris as Robert
- Martha Plimpton as Sarah
- Stephen Colbert as Harry
- Jill Paice as Susan/Choirgirl
- Craig Bierko as Peter
- Jennifer Laura Thompson as Jenny
- Jon Cryer as David
- Katie Finneran as Amy
- Aaron Lazar as Paul
- Patti LuPone as Joanne
- Jim Walton as Larry
- Christina Hendricks as April
- Anika Noni Rose as Marta
- Chryssie Whitehead as Kathy

=== Ensemble ===
- Alexa Green
- Fred Inkley
- Rob Lorey
- Jessica Vosk
- Callie Carter
- Ariana DeBose
- Sean Ewig
- Ashley Blair Fitzgerald
- Lorin Latarro
- Lee Wiltkins

== Musical numbers ==
Act I

- "Company" — Robert and Company
- "The Little Things You Do Together" — Joanne and Couples
- "Sorry-Grateful" — Harry, David and Larry
- "You Could Drive a Person Crazy" — Kathy, April and Marta
- "Have I Got a Girl for You" — Larry, Peter, Paul, David, Harry
- "Someone Is Waiting" — Robert
- "Another Hundred People" — Marta
- "Getting Married Today" — Amy, Paul, Choirgirl, and Company
- "Marry Me a Little" — Robert

Act II

- "Side by Side by Side"/"What Would We Do without You?" — Robert and Couples
- "Poor Baby" — Sarah, Jenny, Susan, Amy, Joanne
- "Have I Got a Girl for You" (Reprise) — Larry, Peter, Paul, David, Harry
- "Tick-Tock" — Kathy (Instrumental)
- "Barcelona" — Robert and April
- "The Ladies Who Lunch" — Joanne
- "Being Alive" — Robert and Couples
- "Finale Ultimo (Company)" — Robert and Company

== Release ==
The film had a limited theatrical release beginning on June 15, 2011. The film was screened in thirty-seven theaters and grossed a total of $102,591.
