= Best Worst Thing That Ever Could Have Happened =

- Official release poster
- Directed by: Lonny Price
- Produced by: Bruce David Klein
- Cinematography: Matthew Howe; Elaine Epstein
- Edited by: Rikki Portner
- Distributed by: Abramorama
- Release dates: October 9, 2016 (New York Film Festival); November 18, 2016 (United States)
- Running time: 96 minutes
- Country: United States
- Language: English

Best Worst Thing That Ever Could Have Happened is a 2016 American documentary film directed by Lonny Price and produced by Bruce David Klein with Price, Kitt Lavoie and Ted Schillinger. Scott Rudin and Eli Bush serve as executive producers. The film tells the story of the making of the original Broadway production of Merrily We Roll Along. The film is a production of Atlas Media Corp. in association with Allright Productions.

In September 2016, the film was acquired by Abramorama for theatrical distribution.

The film premiered at the New York Film Festival in October 2016 and was released theatrically on November 18, 2016.

== About the film ==
Merrily We Roll Along is a 1981 musical based on the 1934 play of the same name by George S. Kaufman and Moss Hart. The book of the musical was written by George Furth with lyrics and music by Stephen Sondheim. Hal Prince directed the original production, which opened on Broadway in 1981 and closed after 16 performances. Best Worst Thing That Ever Could Have Happened features interviews with the creators and original cast of the now-classic show as well as rare and never before seen footage from the rehearsal process.

== Film includes appearances by ==
- Jason Alexander
- Donna Marie Asbury
- James Bonkovsky
- David Cady
- Liz Callaway
- Terry Finn
- Paul Gemignani
- Adam Guettel
- Steven Jacob
- Ann Morrison
- Mandy Patinkin
- Tonya Pinkins
- Abigail Pogrebin
- Lonny Price
- Daisy Prince
- Hal Prince
- Forest D. Ray
- Frank Rich
- Clark Sayre
- David Shine
- Stephen Sondheim
- Jim Walton
- James Weissenbach
- Maryrose Wood

== Critical reception ==
Critical reception of the film was overwhelmingly positive. The film's score on Rotten Tomatoes is 95% with 21 reviews. David Rooney of The Hollywood Reporter called the film a “lovingly assembled documentary” and stated that “Mickey and Judy would have loved it, bittersweet ending and all.” Michael Schulman of The New Yorker called it a “moving documentary” and wrote: “It’s hard now to imagine the audience members who stormed out, exasperated, during the original run, but seeing the cast members reflect on the ordeal shows how devastating it was to realize they were on a sinking ship—and that those 'gods' Sondheim and Prince were mortal after all.” Odie Anderson of the Village Voice said the film "is sure to satisfy theater wonks, Sondheim fans, curious moviegoers and lovers of Broadway." Jude Dry of IndieWire gave the film an A rating, saying, "’Best Worst Thing’ is more than a story about a Broadway show; its most poignant moments examine the thrill of dreams coming true, and the inevitable comedown afterwards."
