= Sondheim! The Birthday Concert =

- Genre: Concert
- Directed by: Lonny Price
- Presented by: David Hyde Pierce
- Theme music composer: Stephen Sondheim
- Opening theme: "Organ Prelude" from Sweeney Todd: The Demon Barber Of Fleet Street
- Ending theme: "Happy Birthday To You" by Patty and Mildred Hill
- Composer: Stephen Sondheim
- Country of origin: United States
- Original language: English

Production
- Executive producers: Bonnie Comley; Stewart F. Lane; Cathy Fitzpatrick; David Horn
- Producers: Christopher Massimine; Mort Swinsky; Lonny Price
- Production locations: Avery Fisher Hall, New York City
- Editors: Gary Bradley; Laura Young
- Camera setup: Multi-camera
- Running time: 116 mins
- Production company: Ellen M. Krass Productions

Original release
- Network: PBS
- Release: November 16, 2010

Related
- Take Me to the World: A Sondheim 90th Celebration

Sondheim! The Birthday Concert was a concert celebrating the 80th birthday of Broadway composer Stephen Sondheim. The concert was directed by Lonny Price and hosted by David Hyde Pierce. The event was performed at Avery Fisher Hall within Lincoln Center in New York City on March 15 and 16 in 2010. The New York Philharmonic accompanied performers including Michael Cerveris, Alexander Gemignani, Joanna Gleason, Patti LuPone, Audra McDonald, Donna Murphy, Mandy Patinkin, Bernadette Peters, Elaine Stritch, Marin Mazzie, and the 2009 Broadway revival cast of West Side Story.

It was broadcast as an episode of Great Performances on PBS on November 16 of the same year. A DVD of the concert was also released.

== Performances ==
In order of appearance

Performer(s)	Song	Show	Significance
New York Philharmonic	"Organ Prelude"	Sweeney Todd: The Demon Barber of Fleet Street	—N/a
New York Philharmonic	"Birthday Overture"	—N/a	—N/a
Karen Olivo and company of 2009 revival of West Side Story	"America"	West Side Story	Olivo played Anita in the 2009 revival of West Side Story
Alexander Gemignani	"Something's Coming"	West Side Story	Played John Hinckley in the 2004 revival of Assassins; Beadle Bamford in the 2005 revival of Sweeney Todd; Boatman/Dennis in the 2008 revival of Sunday in the Park with George; Addison Mizner in original off-Broadway production of Road Show
Marin Mazzie and Jason Danieley	"We're Gonna Be All Right"	Do I Hear a Waltz?	Mazzie: Played Clara in the original production of Passion; was a replacement for Rapunzel in the original production of Into the Woods
Victoria Clark	"Don't Laugh"	Hot Spot	Played Sally Durant Plummer in two productions of Follies; the Beggar Woman in Sweeney Todd in Concert.
Nathan Gunn	"Johanna"	Sweeney Todd: The Demon Barber of Fleet Street	Sweeney Todd in a production of Sweeney Todd: The Demon Barber of Fleet Street
Matt Cavenaugh, Jenn Colella, Laura Osnes and Bobby Steggert	"You're Gonna Love Tomorrow/Love Will See Us Through"	Follies	Cavenaugh: Henrik in the 2000 production of A Little Night Music; Osnes: Beth in the HBO television documentary Six by Sondheim in 2013
Nathan Gunn and Audra McDonald	"Too Many Mornings"	Follies	McDonald: Clara in the Live from Lincoln Center production of Passion; Beggar Woman in the Live from the Lincoln Center production of Sweeney Todd: The Demon Barber of Fleet Street
John McMartin	"The Road You Didn't Take"	Follies	Benjamin Stone in the original production of Follies; The Mysterious Man/Narrator in the 2002 revival of Into the Woods; Doctor Tambourri in a benefit concert of Passion
Chip Zien and Joanna Gleason	"It Takes Two"	Into the Woods	Zien: The Baker in the original cast of Into the Woods; Gleason: The Baker's Wife in the original cast of Into the Woods
Jim Walton	"Growing Up"	Merrily We Roll Along	Franklin Shepard in the original cast of Merrily We Roll Along; Anthony in the 1989 Broadway revival of Sweeney Todd
Mandy Patinkin	"Finishing the Hat"	Sunday in the Park with George	Patinkin: Georges Seurat in the original cast of Sunday in the Park With George; Buddy Plummer in a concert production of Follies; Peters: Dot in the original cast of Sunday in the Park With George; the Witch in the original Broadway cast of Into the Woods; Rose Thompson Hovick in the 2003 revival of Gypsy; Desiree Armfeldt in the first Broadway revival of A Little Night Music; Sally Durant Plummer in the 2011 revival of Follies
Mandy Patinkin and Bernadette Peters	"Move On"	Sunday in the Park with George	Patinkin: Georges Seurat in the original cast of Sunday in the Park With George; Buddy Plummer in a concert production of Follies; Peters: Dot in the original cast of Sunday in the Park With George; the Witch in the original Broadway cast of Into the Woods; Rose Thompson Hovick in the 2003 revival of Gypsy; Desiree Armfeldt in the first Broadway revival of A Little Night Music; Sally Durant Plummer in the 2011 revival of Follies
George Hearn and Michael Cerveris	"Pretty Women"	Sweeney Todd: The Demon Barber of Fleet Street	Hearn: Sweeney Todd in several productions of Sweeney Todd: The Demon Barber of Fleet Street; Cerveris: Sweeney Todd in the 2005 Broadway Revival of Sweeney Todd; John Wilkes Booth in the Original Broadway Production of Assassins; Giorgio in the Live from Lincoln Center production of Passion; Wilson Mizner in the 2008 Off-Broadway production of Road Show; LuPone: Mrs. Lovett in the 2005 revival of Sweeney Todd: The Demon Barber of Fleet Street; Joanne in several productions of Company; Fosca in the Lincoln Center concert of Passion; Rose Thompson Hovick in the 2008 revival of Gypsy
George Hearn, Michael Cerveris, and Patti LuPone	"A Little Priest"	Sweeney Todd: The Demon Barber of Fleet Street	
New York Philharmonic, Blaine Hoven, María Riccetto	"Goodbye For Now"	Reds	—N/a
Laura Benanti	"So Many People"	Saturday Night	Cinderella in the 2002 revival of Into the Woods; Gypsy Rose Lee in the 2008 revival of Gypsy
David Hyde Pierce	"Beautiful Girls"	Follies	—N/a
Patti LuPone	"The Ladies Who Lunch"	Company	See above
Marin Mazzie	"Losing My Mind"	Follies	See above
Audra McDonald	"The Glamorous Life"	A Little Night Music	See above
Donna Murphy	"Could I Leave You?"	Follies	Fosca in the original production of Passion
Bernadette Peters	"Not a Day Goes By"	Merrily We Roll Along	See above
Elaine Stritch	"I'm Still Here"	Follies	Joanne in the original production of Company; Played Hattie Walker in a concert production of Follies
Company	"Sunday"	Sunday in the Park with George	—N/a
Company	"Happy Birthday"	—N/a	—N/a
