= Merrily We Roll Along (play) =

1934 play by George S. Kaufman and Moss Hart

Publicity flyer

Merrily We Roll Along is a play by George S. Kaufman and Moss Hart. It concerns a man who has lost the idealistic values of his youth. Its innovative structure presents the story in reverse order, with the character regressing from a mournful adult to a young man whose future is filled with promise.

The 1934 Broadway production received mostly good notices but was a financial failure and has not been revived on Broadway. The play later received a musical adaptation in 1981.

== Plot ==
The play has three acts of three scenes each. Every scene is set earlier than the previous one.

=== Act One ===
In Scene I, it is 1934, and Richard Niles is a pretentious 40-year-old playwright who writes successful but forgettable frothy comedies. Niles is hosting a party for his wealthy friends at his Long Island home on the opening night of his newest play. His life is empty, petty and loveless. Among the guests at the party are Althea Royce, his materialistic wife; Sam Frankl, a prolific composer; and Julia Glenn, Niles's final remaining true friend and a struggling alcoholic. The party guests play poker and talk until Cyrus Winthrop, an art dealer who invented a material called "cellopaper" a long time before, mentions a painter named Jonathan Crale. Crale used to be a close friend of Niles, but they have since parted ways. After the arrival of newspapers gushing praise for Niles's newest play, Julia returns heavily drunk and collapses onto the drink table. After returning to her feet, she leaves the party and Niles for good. After one of the guests, Ivy Carrol, cuts her hand picking up glass, another guest, David, retrieves iodine to treat the wound. After Ivy and David leave, Althea confronts Niles about his possible affair with Ivy and how he only cares about making a hit. The argument is reaching a climax when Ivy returns, and in the heat of the moment Althea throws the iodine in Ivy's face and proclaims that everything is over between her and Niles. The curtain comes down.

In Scene II, it is 1927 in the Restaurant Le Coq D'Or. Several guests are chatting about the plays of Althea Royce, who is at the height of her peak as an actress. She has only recently married Niles. Julia and Crale arrive, trying to rekindle their friendship with Niles. Niles has cut off all contact with Crale, and Crale is now going to Niles's favorite lunch spot to see if he can talk to him. Julia and Crale reminisce about their past for a bit, but then Niles appears. Niles and Crale's reunion quickly devolves into blows. Julia pleads with the two to stop fighting as an excited crowd gathers. The curtain comes down on the crowd's cheers drowning out Julia.

In Scene III, it is 1926 in Richard Niles's apartment. Niles's brother George comes to visit, and confronts him about rumors of an affair with Royce, who is married to Harry Nixon. He denies it, and the conversation is interrupted with news that his latest play's movie rights were bought for $75,000. George leaves and Crale enters. Crale reminds Niles of the time when he was just starting out and wrote plays for art, not money, and tells him to remove Althea's bad influence from his life and focus on the woman who truly loves him: Julia, who has taken up drinking to cope with witnessing Niles's destruction. Crale leaves, and Niles is about to start following his advice when Althea enters. She has divorced Harry to be with Niles. Niles receives word that Harry has killed himself in response. Althea embraces Niles, and after a moment he embraces her too. The act one curtain comes down.

=== Act Two ===
In Scene I, it is 1925 in Crale's studio. Julia arrives, practically giddy with excitement. Niles is to return soon from an eight-month cruise and she is excited to see him again. While Crale and Julia are trying to figure out which port he will arrive at, Niles comes into the house accompanied by Albert Ogden, the boat's captain. Julia asks Niles whether he's finished the play he's been working on, and Ogden replies yes; Niles has finished a yacht-set comedy play called "All On Deck" that Ogden is sure will be a hit. This isn't the play Niles had been writing his friends about; he had been working on a more serious play about coal miners. When Julia asks Niles why he abandoned that play, he replies, "[People] don't want plays like that now." Niles leaves, and Julia breaks down. Julia laments that the last time they saw the "real" Niles was the day he got on the boat, and regrets telling him to take the cruise. Crale slumps into an easy chair and plays a chord on his accordion, and the curtain comes down.

In Scene II, it is 1924 in the courthouse. The divorce proceedings for Richard Niles and Helen Murney have attracted large crowds. Helen filed for divorce after catching Niles cheating with Althea on a leopard skin rug after returning to a party, and the tabloids have been covering the scandal and trial nonstop. The trial has been very stressful for Niles, and his friends, along with Ogden, try to convince him to take a cruise to escape the stress. Niles seems unconvinced and wants to stay with his friends, but abruptly two tabloid photographers jump in with the leopard skin rug and stage a photo op. Niles breaks down crying and agrees to go on the cruise, and the curtain comes down.

In Scene III, it is 1923 in Althea's apartment. Althea is having a party to celebrate the success of Niles's newest play. At the party is Harry Nixon, Althea's husband. He is a fading actor who is clearly being supplanted in Althea’s affections by the rising star, Richard Niles. While the party guests fawn over Richard, Harry sits dejectedly, drinking heavily and realizing his marriage is over. Richard, still possessing a modicum of his former humility, is uncomfortable with the blatant adoration, but Althea continues to pull him into her orbit. Julia and Jonathan Crale attend, still Richard's closest confidants, though they watch with growing concern as he begins to choose the "glittering" world of Althea over his artistic integrity. The scene ends with Harry Nixon wandering out into the night, ignored by the revelers, foreshadowing his eventual suicide.

=== Act Three ===
In Scene I, it is 1922 in the modest apartment of Richard Niles and his wife, Helen Murney. Richard is a struggling, high-minded intellectual who has just finished a serious, philosophical play titled The Man Who Met Himself. He is full of fire and integrity, supported by Helen, who believes in his genius. Althea Royce, already a famous Broadway star, visits the apartment because she has heard of the play. She tells Richard the play is brilliant but "unproducible" in its current state; she insists that if he rewrites it to be a lighter, more commercial vehicle for her, she can make him the most famous writer in New York. Despite Helen’s protests and Richard's own artistic qualms, the lure of success is too great. He agrees to make the changes, marking the exact moment his "soul-selling" begins.

In Scene II, it is 1916 in a small, humble boarding house room. A very young Richard is seen with Helen Murney. They are deeply in love and planning their future. Richard is working on his very first manuscripts, fueled by a pure, unadulterated passion for the theatre. Jonathan Crale and Julia Glenn are there too; they are a tight-knit trio of ambitious, "pure" artists. They make a pact to always stay true to one another and to their art, swearing that they will never let money or fame change them. They toast to a future that, as the audience knows from Act One, will never come to pass.

In Scene III, it is 1916 at a college graduation ceremony. The stage is set for a commencement speech. A youthful, glowing Richard Niles stands at the podium as the class valedictorian. He delivers a stirring, impassioned speech to his fellow graduates about the importance of idealism. He warns them against the corrupting influence of the world and quotes Polonius from Hamlet: "This above all: to thine own self be true." He speaks with absolute sincerity, unaware that the next eighteen years of his life will be a systematic betrayal of every word he is currently speaking.

The curtain falls on the image of the innocent young man at the height of his integrity, creating a devastating irony against the bitter, empty shell of a man seen at the play's beginning.

== Background and production history ==
On a journey from Hollywood to New York in 1931, Hart was inspired to write a play about an American family's difficulty over 30 years coping with the challenges of life in the 20th century, beginning with their innocence and optimism at the century's start to the dashed hopes caused by the stock market crash of 1929. But before he could realize his vision, Noël Coward's British version of a similar story, Cavalcade, premiered, and he shelved the idea. A few years later, Hart turned to Kaufman, his collaborator on the 1930 hit Once in a Lifetime. The idea had now evolved to tell a story backward about an idealistic but ambitious playwright and his difficulties.

The Broadway production, directed by Kaufman, opened on September 29, 1934, at the Music Box Theatre, where it ran for 155 performances. The 55-member cast included Kenneth MacKenna as Richard Niles, Walter Abel as Jonathan Crale, Jessie Royce Landis as Althea Royce, and Mary Philips as Julia Glenn.

The play has not been revived on Broadway, and its tour following the Broadway production was short.

== Critical response ==
Critic Brooks Atkinson of The New York Times wrote: "After this declaration of ethics, it will be impossible to dismiss Mr. Kaufman and Mr. Hart as clever jesters with an instinct for the stage." Time wrote, "Superbly staged...; superbly acted by the biggest cast seen in a legitimate Broadway production this season, Merrily We Roll Along is an amusing and affecting study...."

Despite good notices, the play was not a financial success, as the demands of the large-scale production made it expensive. In retrospect, the Times has noted that the play suffers from a "Depression sensibility. The notion that you can't get ahead without selling out is one that held particular appeal.... There was something both morally and politically suspect about worldly fortune at a time when, as Franklin D. Roosevelt said in his 1937 inaugural address, one-third of the nation was 'ill housed, ill clad, ill nourished.'"

== Adaptations ==
In 1981, the play was loosely adapted as a musical of the same name with a book by George Furth and lyrics and music by Stephen Sondheim. While the original Broadway production was a notorious failure, the musical has since been successfully staged with numerous changes. Sondheim contributed new songs to several of the show's incarnations.
