= Ann Morrison =

American actress (born 1956)

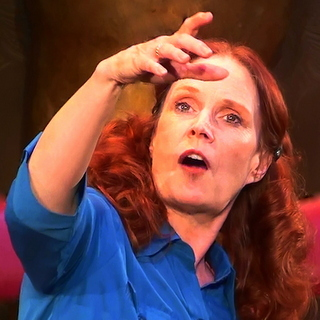
- Born: April 9, 1956
- Awards: Theatre World Award (1982)

Ann Morrison (born April 9, 1956) is an American actress, best known for her Broadway debut as Mary Flynn in the Stephen Sondheim/George Furth musical, Merrily We Roll Along directed by Harold Prince for which she won the 1982 Theatre World Award. Off-Broadway she played Lizzie in the highly acclaimed Polly Pen/Peggy Harmon musical Goblin Market which garnered her a 1986 Drama Desk Award Nomination as Best Actress in a Musical and a Best Plays Theatrical Yearbook Citation as Best Actress in a Musical.

== Early life ==
Her family co-created a summer theater company called The Banner Players performing on the shores of Lake Geneva, Wisconsin when Morrison was a teenager. This experience taught her true cooperation as she would star in Gigi one week and work on the back stage crew the next. Her high school plays and musicals gave her an outlet during the school year and her parents would continually have her join their programs and performances at George Williams College where they both were teachers. With graduation she won a scholarship to a new musical theater training program at Boston Conservatory of Music.

== Career ==
Morrison left Boston Conservatory, attended the HB Studios in New York, spent time in San Francisco before arriving back in Chicago. At 19, she joined The Benny Kim Show, a 7-member family band created by Korean Big Band leader Benny Kim. As Emcee and singer/trombone player she wore a black afro wig and a '70s white jump suit with glitter and fringe. They played nightclubs and Holiday Inns in and around Chicago for the next year. This ended when while on stage it was announced that she would marry the second eldest son and left the show.

Morrison was admitted to an apprentice program that Burt Reynolds was sponsoring at his Jupiter, Florida dinner theater. Besides singing in the lobby before performances the 10 member group would work back stage on the crew. This gave Morrison the chance to watch and get to know the TV and film stars (Tyne Daly, Sally Field, and Kate Jackson) some of whom were making a stage debut. She was given an opportunity when it was decided she would play the Girl in The Fantasticks.

At the end of the year-long program each apprentice earned their Actors' Equity Association card by signing a contract for The Sound Of Music (Morrison played Sister Margaretta), the last show of the season. Prior to that they each appeared on Dinah! when Dinah Shore brought her daytime TV talk show to the stage of the Burt Reynolds Theater for one week. Morrison sang "I Can Cook Too" wearing a 1940s style costume with hat and gloves. After wowing Dinah and the live audience, Burt Reynolds declared that Morrison was the one to watch and that we would probably see her on Broadway in a year or so.

Having Earned her AEA card, Morrison moved to New York where within a month was cast in a new Waldman/Uhry musical Dream Time. Regional productions of Grease, Babes In Arms and Godspell followed. Then she was cast in a role that would change her life. After seeing her play silent film actress Mabel Normand in a new musical Keystone at the GEVA Theatre in Rochester, NY, famed choreographer Ron Field told her she should play Mary Flynn in the new Sondheim/Furth musical Merrily We Roll Along. All of the roles had been cast but Harold Prince was still looking for Mary. She was flown to New York for a first audition for the casting director, then returned to GEVA to finish her run. Back in New York, on her 25th birthday she was asked to sing for Harold Prince and Stephen Sondheim. She recalls in interviews that Prince walked down to the stage and offered her the role of Mary. They would begin rehearsals 6 months later.

Much has been written about what happened when Merrily We Roll Along opened on Broadway. During 6 weeks of previews (52 performances) James Weisenbach was replaced by Jim Walton and Larry Fuller took over as choreographer when Ron Field was replaced. Morrison claims that there were changes in every performance until 3 days before opening. The morning after the show closed, the cast went into the studios at RCA Records to make the Original Broadway Cast recording. The next spring, Morrison received a Theatre World Award for her performance as Mary Flynn.

Together with former Merrily castmate Jason Alexander, she replaced the original cast of Forbidden Broadway at Palsson's in New York. She impersonated Mary Martin, Julie Andrews, Carol Channing and appeared on TV on The Merv Griffin Show as Patti LuPone in Evita. While playing in Forbidden Broadway she taped a TV version of Keystone for broadcast on New Jersey Network, reprising her role as Mabel Normand.

American producer Louis Busch Hager wanted to cast an American actress in the title role of a new musical version of Peg O' My Heart set for the West End in London. He cast Morrison after her London audition and back in New York she began a series of backers auditions while working with composer David Heneker (Half A Sixpence). Heneker completed the song Manhattan Hometown while he and Morrison were staying at Hager's Cooperstown, NY home. Peg as the musical was now titled, began rehearsals in London for an April 1984 opening. She was welcomed by her British cast of West End stars Sian Phillips, Edward Duke, and Patricia Michael, in a small production (9 characters, no chorus) giving them a modest run through the summer. They made a cast recording before Morrison returned to New York.

In the years that followed, Morrison created the role of Lizzie in the highly acclaimed Polly Pen/Peggy Harmon musical Goblin Market first Off-Off Broadway at the Vineyard Theatre, then moving to Circle In The Square Downtown Off Broadway. This earned her a Drama Desk Award for Outstanding Actress in a Musical nomination. With Teri Klausner she made an Original Cast recording with JAY Records. In her new home of Los Angeles she played Faye Apple in the West Coast Premiere of Anyone Can Whistle and won a Dramalogue Award for Blame It On The Movies II. In regional theaters across the country she has starred in Peter Pan, Guys and Dolls, Little Shop Of Horrors, Cabaret, On a Clear Day You Can See Forever, Oliver!, Good News, musical versions of A Midsummer Night's Dream, Twelfth Night and Love's Labour's Lost, Can-Can, Sunset Boulevard, Shadowlands and On The Verge. She has done countless cabaret performances and concerts, most notably the S.T.A.G.E. benefits for APLA, the Merrily We Roll Along Reunion Concert in 2002 and the Stephen Sondheim birthday celebration, Children And Art, at the New Amsterdam Theater.

In 2006 Harold Prince secured her for the workshop and several backers auditions for the new musical LoveMusik, to play Lotte Lenya opposite Michael Cerveris as Kurt Weill. When the show opened on Broadway, the role went to Donna Murphy and a small role was added for Morrison who understudied and performed as Lotte Lenya on May 13, 2007.

Morrison is currently touring the U.S. in the title role of the 2025-26 National Tour of Kimberly Akimbo.

== Recordings ==
Merrily We Roll Along, Peg, Goblin Market, A Stephen Sondheim Collection, Songs Of New York, Richard Rodgers' last musical I Remember Mama, Good News!, Lady Be Good, The Busby Berkeley Album. You Can't Put Ketchup On The Moon, Sing Before Breakfast, The Road To Ruin, LoveMusik.
