= Lonny Price =

American dramatist (born 1959)

- Born: March 9, 1959 (age 67); New York City, New York, U.S.
- Education: Juilliard School
- Occupations: Actor; director; writer
- Years active: 1979–present

Lonny Price (born March 9, 1959) is an American actor, director and writer, primarily in theatre. He is best known for his New York directing work, including Sunset Boulevard, Sweeney Todd, Company, and Sondheim! The Birthday Concert. As an actor, he is perhaps best known for his creation of the role of Charley Kringas in the Broadway musical Merrily We Roll Along, Neil Kellerman in Dirty Dancing, and Ronnie Crawford in The Muppets Take Manhattan.

== Biography ==
=== Early life ===
Price was born in New York City, the son of Edie L. (Greene), a merchandise manager, and Murray A. Price, a car leasing company owner. Price grew up in Fresh Meadows, New York and Metuchen, New Jersey. He attended the Fiorello H. LaGuardia High School of Performing Arts, and the Juilliard School, which he only attended for a year in order to begin pursuing acting professionally.

== Acting career ==
His early career was spent performing in Off-Broadway productions, including Class Enemy in 1979, for which he won a Theater World Award for outstanding stage debut.

His first major Broadway credit was the ill-fated Stephen Sondheim/Hal Prince/George Furth musical Merrily We Roll Along (1981), which underwent constant changes during an unusually long preview period and closed after only sixteen performances. His next show, the Athol Fugard play "Master Harold"...and the Boys—in which he portrayed a South African student opposite Danny Glover and Zakes Mokae as the family servants—ran for eight months.

Possibly his most significant Off-Broadway stage credit as an actor is the William Finn – James Lapine musical Falsettoland as Mendel in 1990.

Price's film and television credits include major supporting roles in The Muppets Take Manhattan and Dirty Dancing, and guest appearances on The Golden Girls and Law & Order, among others.

In 1989, he appeared as Jimmy Durante in the musical biography Durante.

== Directing career ==
Price made his directorial debut with the Off-Broadway revival of The Education of H*Y*M*A*N K*A*P*L*A*N in 1989 for the American Jewish Theater, followed by The Rothschilds and Juno, both of which received Outer Critics Circle nominations for Best Revival.

Price served as Associate Artistic Director for the American Jewish Theatre from the late 1980s through the mid-1990s. He was artistic director at Musical Theatre Works, a non-profit theatre dedicated solely to the development of new musicals until 2002, when he became resident director.

He was a staff director for the ABC soap opera One Life to Live, for which he was part of a team that received a Daytime Emmy Award nomination for Outstanding Drama Series Directing in 1995.

He has directed numerous musical productions, both concert and non-concert, with the New York Philharmonic, which include Stephen Sondheim's Sweeney Todd with Patti LuPone and George Hearn in 2000, for which he won an Emmy Award, Leonard Bernstein's Candide (2004), with Kristin Chenoweth, Sir Thomas Allen, and Patti LuPone, Passion with Patti LuPone and Audra McDonald, which won an Emmy Award, and Camelot with Gabriel Byrne, Marin Mazzie, Christopher Lloyd, and Nathan Gunn, among other productions.

In 2000, Price co-wrote (with Linda Kline), directed, and starred in A Class Act, based on the life and career of composer-lyricist Edward Kleban, whose sole Broadway credit was A Chorus Line. The score consisted of songs Kleban had written for other shows that remained unproduced. After a two-month run at the Manhattan Theatre Club, it transferred to the Ambassador Theatre, where it fared less successfully and closed after three months. It earned Price his sole Tony Award nomination to date, for Best Book of a Musical. The show was also nominated for four other Tony Awards, including Best Musical.

In 2007, he directed a Broadway revival of 110 in the Shade at the Roundabout Theatre Company, starring Audra McDonald. The play was nominated for the 2007 Tony Award, Best Revival of a Musical (among others).

In March 2010, he conceived and directed Sondheim! The Birthday Concert at the New York Philharmonic, celebrating the composer-lyricist's 80th Birthday. The PBS television broadcast was nominated for several Emmy Awards, and Price won for "Outstanding Directing For A Variety, Music Or Comedy Special".

In April 2011, he directed an acclaimed concert production of Sondheim's Company with Neil Patrick Harris, Stephen Colbert, Martha Plimpton, Christina Hendricks, and Patti LuPone, backed by the New York Philharmonic.

In 2013, he again directed Sweeney Todd at the New York Philharmonic, this time starring Emma Thompson and Bryn Terfel. The PBS telecast for Live from Lincoln Center won the Emmy Award for "Outstanding Variety, Music, Or Comedy Special".

He has directed numerous productions at the Chicago Ravinia Festival, including Sweeney Todd, Gypsy, Sunday in the Park With George, Anyone Can Whistle, Passion, and Annie Get Your Gun. Frequent collaborators for his productions include performers Patti LuPone, Audra McDonald, Michael Cerveris, and George Hearn, and musical director and conductor Paul Gemignani.

He directed the 2014 Broadway production of Lady Day at Emerson's Bar and Grill starring McDonald, who won her historic sixth Tony Award for her performance as Billie Holiday. He would subsequently stage the production in 2017 on the West End in London, again starring McDonald, as well as the HBO special. In 2016, he directed the acclaimed London revival of Sunset Boulevard starring Glenn Close, which transferred to Broadway and played a limited run in 2017.

In 2016, Price directed the documentary Best Worst Thing That Ever Could Have Happened, which chronicles the ill-fated journey of Stephen Sondheim and Harold Prince's original 1981 Broadway musical Merrily We Roll Along. It played the New York Film Festival, and was named one of the New York Times Top Ten Films of 2016.

His episodic television directing work includes five episodes of Desperate Housewives and three episodes of 2 Broke Girls.

In 2019, Price directed the Roundabout Theatre Company premiere of the musical Scotland, PA. Price is a guest instructor at HB Studio.

== Personal life ==
Price is openly gay.

== Credits ==
=== Broadway ===
| Year | Title | Role | Notes |
|---|---|---|---|
| 1981 | The Survivor | Rudy | |
| 1981 | Merrily We Roll Along | Charley Kringas | |
| 1982 | "Master Harold"...and the Boys | Hally | |
| 1986 | Rags | Ben | |
| 1987 | Broadway | Roy Lane | |
| 1987 | Burn This | Larry (replacement) | |
| 1994 | Sally Marr…and her escorts | Director, Writer | |
| 2001 | A Class Act | Ed Kleban, Director, Book | Tony Award for Best Musical (nominee) |
| 2003 | Urban Cowboy | Director | |
| 2003 | "Master Harold"...and the Boys | Director | |
| 2007 | 110 in the Shade | Director | Tony Award for Best Revival of a Musical (nominee), Drama Desk Award for Best Revival of a Musical (nominee) |
| 2014 | Lady Day at Emerson's Bar and Grill | Director | also West End |
| 2017 | Sunset Boulevard | Director | also West End |
| 2022 | Walking with Ghosts | Director | also West End |

=== Off-Broadway ===
| Year | Title | Role | Theater/Company | Notes |
|---|---|---|---|---|
| 1979 | Class Enemy | Rakes | Perry St. Theater | |
| 1983 | Up from Paradise | Abel | Jewish Repertory Theater | |
| 1985 | Rommel’s Garden | Private Ackenbaum | Harold Clurman Theater | |
| 1986 | Room Service | Faker Englund | Roundabout Theatre Company | |
| 1987 | Come Blow Your Horn | Buddy Baker | Jewish Repertory Theatre | |
| 1989 | The Education of H*Y*M*A*N K*A*P*L*A*N | Director | Jewish Repertory Theatre | |
| 1990 | Falsettoland | Mendel | Lucille Lortel Theatre | |
| 1990 | The Rothschilds | Director | American Jewish Theatre | Outer Critics Circle Award for Outstanding Revival (nominee) |
| 1991 | Grown Ups | Director | American Jewish Theatre | |
| 1991 | The Matchmaker | Director | Roundabout Theatre Company | |
| 1992 | Juno | Director | Vineyard Theatre | Outer Critics Circle Award for Outstanding Revival (nominee) |
| 1995 | Pal Joey | Director | New York City Center | |
| 1996 | The Springhill Singing Disaster | Director | 47th Street Theatre | |
| 1997 | Visiting Mr. Green | Director | Union Square Theatre | |
| 1999 | Finian's Rainbow | Director | New York City Center | |
| 2000 | Sweeney Todd | Director | David Geffen Hall | |
| 2000 | A Class Act | Ed Kleban, Director, Book | New York City Center | |
| 2004 | Can-Can | Director | New York City Center | |
| 2004 | Candide | Director | David Geffen Hall | |
| 2006 | Kismet | Director | New York City Center | |
| 2006 | Stopping Traffic | Director | Vineyard Theatre | |
| 2011 | Company | Director | David Geffen Hall | |
| 2019 | Scotland, PA | Director | Roundabout Theatre Company | |

=== Film ===
| Year | Title | Role | Notes |
|---|---|---|---|
| 1980 | Headin’ for Broadway | Steven Levy | |
| 1981 | The Chosen | Davey | |
| 1984 | The Muppets Take Manhattan | Ronnie Crawford | |
| 1987 | Dirty Dancing | Neil Kellerman | |
| 1988 | Hot to Trot | Frank | |
| 1992 | Flodder in Amerika! | Geoffrey | |
| 2016 | Best Worst Thing That Ever Could Have Happened | Director, Writer | |

=== Television ===
| Year | Title | Role | Notes |
|---|---|---|---|
| 1979 | ABC Afterschool Specials | Danny Dawson | |
| 1980 | Love Cycle: A Soap Operetta | Tom | |
| 1985 | Hail to the Chief | Steve | 1 episode |
| 1987 | Not Quite Human | Mr. Sturges | |
| 1988 | The Golden Girls | Hastings | 1 episode |
| 1988 | Dear John | Andrew Garberg | 1 episode |
| 1989 | Jacob Have I Loved | Mr. Rice | TV movie |
| 1990 | Doctor Doctor | Peter Balcovske | 1 episode |
| 1990 | Loving | Howie Miller | 1 episode |
| 1991–1992 | Law & Order | Frank Hoover / Dr. Lieber | 2 episodes |
| 1994–1996 | One Life to Live | Director | 3 episodes |
| 1996 | O'Henry’s Christmas | Jack | TV movie |
| 2001 | PBS Great Performances: Sweeney Todd: The Demon Barber of Fleet Street in Concert | Director | |
| 2005 | PBS Great Performances: Leonard Bernstein's Candide, a Comic Operetta in Two Acts | Director | |
| 2005 | Live from Lincoln Center: Passion | Director | Emmy Award for Outstanding Special Class Program |
| 2007 | PBS Great Performances: Company: A Musical Comedy | Director | |
| 2008 | Live from Lincoln Center: Camelot | Director | |
| 2010 | PBS Great Performances: Sondheim! The Birthday Concert | Director | |
| 2010–2011 | Desperate Housewives | Director | 5 episodes |
| 2011 | PBS Great Performances: Company | Director | |
| 2012 | Live from Lincoln Center: One Singular Sensation! Celebrating Marvin Hamlisch | Director | |
| 2012–2016 | 2 Broke Girls | Director | 3 episodes |
| 2013 | Live from Lincoln Center: Ring Them Bells! A Kander & Ebb Celebration | Director | |
| 2014 | Live from Lincoln Center: Sweeney Todd: The Demon Barber of Fleet Street - In Concert with the New York Philharmonic | Director | |
| 2014 | Live from Lincoln Center: New York Philharmonic New Year’s Eve Gershwin Celebration | Director | |
| 2015 | The Jack and Triumph Show | Director | 2 episodes |
| 2015 | Gypsy: Live from the Savoy Theatre | Director | |
| 2015 | Live from Lincoln Center: Sinatra: Voice for a Century | Director | |
| 2016 | Lady Day at Emerson's Bar and Grill | Director | HBO |
| 2016 | Live from Lincoln Center: New York Philharmonic New Year's Eve: An Enchanted Evening | Director | |
| 2017 | Dirty Dancing | Neil Kellerman | TV movie |
| 2018 | Live from Lincoln Center: New York Philharmonic New Year's Eve with Renée Fleming | Director | |
| 2018 | PBS Great Performances: Harold Prince: The Director’s Life | Director | |
| 2019 | Live from Lincoln Center: New York Philharmonic New Year's Eve 2019: Celebrating Sondheim | Director | |
| 2021 | Show of Titles | Director | |
| 2021 | The Bite | Director | 1 episode |

== Awards and nominations ==
| Award / Organization | Year | Category | Nominated work | Result | Ref(s) |
|---|---|---|---|---|---|
| Theatre World Award | 1980 | Outstanding Stage Debut | Class Enemy | Won | |
| Daytime Emmy Awards | 1995 | Outstanding Drama Series Directing Team | One Life to Live | Nominated | |
| Tony Awards | 2001 | Best Book of a Musical | A Class Act | Nominated | |
| Primetime Emmy Awards | 2002 | Outstanding Classical Music-Dance Program | PBS Great Performances: Sweeney Todd: The Demon Barber of Fleet Street | Won | |
| Primetime Emmy Awards | 2008 | Outstanding Directing for a Variety, Music or Comedy Program | PBS Great Performances: Company | Nominated | |
| Primetime Emmy Awards | 2011 | Outstanding Directing for a Variety, Music or Comedy Special | PBS Great Performances: Sondheim! The Birthday Concert | Won | |
