= Katie Finneran =

American actress (born 1971)

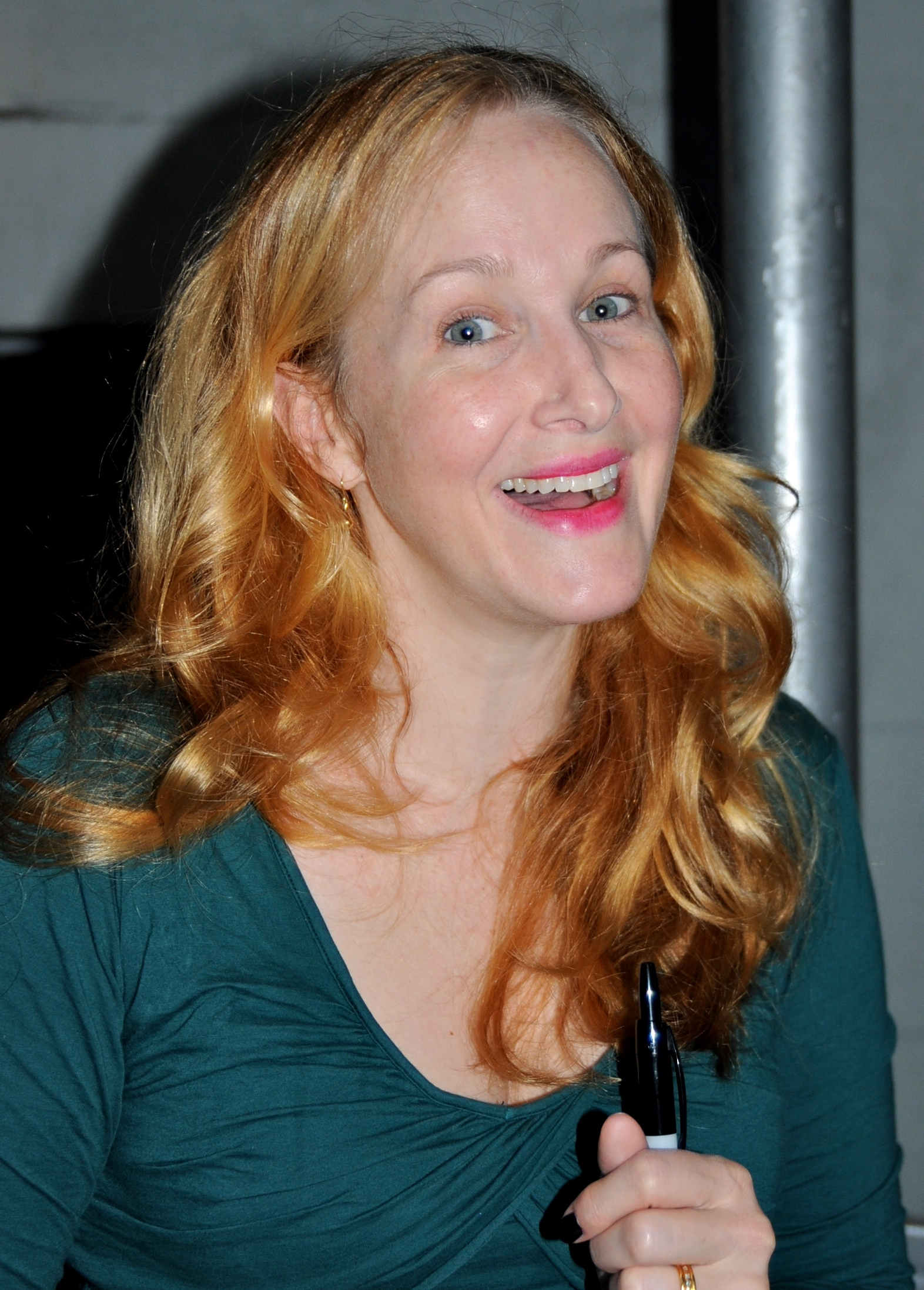
- Finneran in Annie The Musical, October 2012
- Born: January 22, 1971 (age 55); Chicago, Illinois, U.S.
- Education: Carnegie Mellon University
- Occupation: Actress
- Years active: 1990–present
- Spouse: Darren Goldstein (m. 2010)
- Children: 2
- Website: www.katiefinneran.com

Katie Finneran (born January 22, 1971) is an American actress best known for her Tony Award–winning performances in the Broadway play Noises Off in 2002, and the musical Promises, Promises in 2010.

== Early life ==
Finneran was born in Chicago, Illinois, of Irish Catholic extraction. She was raised in Miami, Florida, where she attended the New World School of the Arts High School. She attended Carnegie Mellon University in Pittsburgh for one year before moving to New York City at age 19 to study acting with Uta Hagen at HB Studio.

== Career ==
=== Film ===
Finneran's biggest film role was as Judy Rose in the remake of George A. Romero's Night of the Living Dead. Her film credits include You've Got Mail, Chicken Little, Liberty Heights, Bewitched, Miss Congeniality 2: Armed and Fabulous, and Death to Smoochy.

=== Television ===
She co-starred in television series Wonderfalls. She was also featured as a part of the cast on the Fox show The Inside, in the short-lived CBS sitcom Bram & Alice, and in many guest roles in shows like Frasier, Sex and the City and Oz. In 2007 Finneran was featured in the new series Drive. She played the sister of the main character, Alex Tully (Nathan Fillion).

In an interview for the DVD of the full series of Wonderfalls, Finneran said that when asked if she felt nervous about playing lesbian immigration attorney Sharon Tyler on Wonderfalls she replied, "I'd rather have people think that I'm a lesbian than a lawyer."

In 2012, she co-starred in the Fox sitcom I Hate My Teenage Daughter. From 2013 to 2014, she played Leigh Henry on the NBC sitcom, The Michael J. Fox Show. She has also appeared in the Netflix series Bloodline.

In April 2019, CBS announced that Finneran would be starring in a recurring role as Naomi in the CBS All Access series Why Women Kill.

In 2022, Finneran starred in The Gilded Age on HBO.

=== Theatre ===
Finneran played a "lovely but dim fashion model" in the original Broadway production of Neil Simon's Proposals in 1997–98, Sally Bowles in the 1998 Broadway revival of Cabaret (from November 21, 2000 to January 18, 2001), and call girl Cora in the 1999 Broadway revival of The Iceman Cometh, opposite Kevin Spacey. She also has appeared in My Favorite Year with Tim Curry, John Guare's Bosoms and Neglect, and Smell of the Kill, with Kristen Johnston.

She won the Tony Award and the Drama Desk Award for Best Featured Actress in a Play in 2002 for her role as Brooke Ashton in the Broadway revival of Noises Off.

Finneran appeared Off-Broadway at the Laura Pels Theater in the Greg Kotis play Pig Farm, in the original opening cast as Tina. The play opened in June 2006 and ran through September 23, 2006.

Finneran appeared in the original cast of Love, Loss, and What I Wore, which opened Off-Broadway at the Westside Theater on September 19, 2009 for a four-week engagement ending on October 18, 2009. The play "....is performed by a rotating cast of five. For the first four weeks of the run Ms. [Rosie] O'Donnell is joined by the actresses Tyne Daly, Katie Finneran and Natasha Lyonne, and Samantha Bee..." Finneran returned to the show (after her initial four-week engagement) on November 18, 2009, to fill in for Kristin Chenoweth, and continued on in the play in the next four-week rotation as well (from December 14, 2009, to January 3, 2010). She appeared in the first Broadway revival of the musical Promises, Promises as Marge MacDougall, opposite Kristin Chenoweth and Sean Hayes. The show opened March 27, 2010 and Finneran left the show on October 10, 2010 because of her pregnancy. She won the 2010 Tony Award for Best Featured Actress in a Musical for this role.

In 2011 she played the role of Amy in Company, a filmed version of the 1970 musical of the same name by Stephen Sondheim and George Furth. The production was directed by Lonny Price and accompanied by the New York Philharmonic, conducted by Paul Gemignani. It was filmed live at Avery Fisher Hall in Lincoln Center. The show was led by Neil Patrick Harris.

Finneran played the role of Miss Hannigan in the 2012 Broadway revival of the musical Annie. She left the role in May 2013 to pursue a TV pilot.

Finneran returned to Broadway in 2015 to star in Terrence McNally's It's Only a Play as Julia Budder.

== Personal life ==
Finneran and actor Darren Goldstein married on August 22, 2010; the couple has two children.

== Filmography ==
=== Film ===
Year	Title	Role	Notes
1990	Night of the Living Dead	Judy Rose Larson	
1998	You've Got Mail	Maureen	
1999	Liberty Heights	Mrs. Johnson	
2002	Death to Smoochy	Woman in Crowd	Uncredited
2005	Miss Congeniality 2: Armed and Fabulous	Head Bar Patron	Uncredited
2005	Bewitched	Sheila Wyatt	
2006	Broken Bridges	Patsi	
2007	Firehouse Dog	Felicity Hammer	
2007	Walk the Talk	Linda	
2007	Staten Island	Mrs. Dickenson	
2009	Baby on Board	Sylvia Chambers	
2011	Company	Amy	Filmed production
2013	Movie 43	Angie	Segment: "The Catch"
2020	Freaky	Coral Kessler	

=== Television ===
Year	Title	Role	Notes
1990	Super Force	Allison	Episode: "Prisoners of Love"
1998	Sex and the City	Ellen	Episode: "Models and Mortals"
1999	All My Children	Nurse	1 episode
1999	Frasier	Poppy Delafield	2 episodes
2001	Oz	Patricia Galson	Episode: "Famous Last Words"
2002	Bram & Alice	Kate	8 episodes
2004	Wonderfalls	Sharon Tyler	13 episodes
2005–2006	The Inside	Special Agent Melody Sim	13 episodes
2007	Drive	Becca Freeman	Episode: "Let the Games Begin"
2009	Royal Pains	Julie Kingsley	Episode: "The Honeymoon's Over"
2010	Mercy	Roxanne Flegenheimer	Episode: "Wake Up, Bill"
2010	Damages	Actress	Episode: "All That Crap About Your Family"
2011–2013	I Hate My Teenage Daughter	Nikki Miller	13 episodes
2013–2014	The Michael J. Fox Show	Leigh Henry	22 episodes
2015	Elementary	Barbara Conway	Episode: "Seed Money"
2015–2017	Bloodline	Belle Rayburn	27 episodes
2017–2020	Brockmire	Lucy Brockmire	9 episodes
2018	The Looming Tower	Sheri	4 episodes
2018	Murphy Brown	Christy Shepherd	Episode: "The Girl Who Cried About Wolf"
2019	The Good Fight	Valerie Peyser	Episode: "The One Where Diane Joins the Resistance"
2019	Blindspot	Sheryl Meeks	Episode: "Coder to Killer"
2019	Why Women Kill	Naomi Harte	8 episodes
2022	B Positive	Natalie	Episode: "S'mores, Elvis and a Cubano"
2022	The Blacklist	Mary Sutton	Episode: "Eva Mason (No. 181)"
2023	Up Here	Joan	8 episodes
2023	Secret Invasion	Rosa Dalton	5 episodes
2022 - present	The Gilded Age	Anne Morris	6 episodes (Season 1), 2 episodes (Season 4)

== Stage ==
Year	Title	Role	Venue	Notes	Ref.
1991	On Borrowed Time	understudy Marcia Giles, Mrs. Tritt	Circle in the Square Theater, Broadway		
1992	Two Shakespearean Actors	performer	Cort Theater, Broadway		
1992	My Favorite Year	performer	Vivian Beaumont Theater, Broadway		
1993	In The Summer House	understudy Vivian Constable	Vivian Beaumont Theater, Broadway		
1994	Edith Stein	performer	Jewish Repertory Theater, Off-Broadway		
1994	Present Laughter	Daphne Stillington	Hartford Stage, Connecticut		
1995	The Heiress	Maria	Cort Theater, Broadway		
1996	A Fair Country	Carly Fletcher	Mitzi Newhouse Theater, Off-Broadway		
1997	Proposals	Sammii	Broadhurst Theater, Broadway		
1998	Li'l Abner	Appassionata von Climax	New York City Center		
1998	You Never Can Tell	Gloria	Laura Pels Theater, Off-Broadway		
1998	Bosoms and Neglect	Deirdre	Signature Theatre Company, Off-Broadway		
1999	The Iceman Cometh	Cora	Brooks Atkinson Theatre, Broadway		
2000	Arms and the Man	Raina Petkoff	Gramercy Theater, Off-Broadway		
2000	Hedda Gabler	Mrs. Elvsted	Williamstown Theatre Festival, Massachusetts		
2000	Cabaret	Sally Bowles (replacement)	Studio 54, Broadway		
2001	The Smell of the Kill	Molly	Berkshire Theater Festival, Massachusetts		
2001	Noises Off	Brooke Ashton	Brooks Atkinson Theatre, Broadway		
2006	Pig Farm	Tina	Laura Pels Theater, Off-Broadway		
2007	Mauritius	Mary	Biltmore Theatre, Broadway		
2008	Beyond Therapy	Prudence	Williamstown Theatre Festival, Massachusetts		
2009	Children	Barbara	Williamstown Theatre Festival, Massachusetts		
2009	The Torch-Bearers	Florence McCrickett	Williamstown Theatre Festival, Massachusetts		
2009	Love, Loss, and What I Wore	performer	Westside Theatre, Off-Broadway		
2010	Promises, Promises	Marge	Broadway Theatre, Broadway		
2012	Annie	Miss Hannigan	Palace Theatre, Broadway		
2015	It's Only A Play	Julia Budder	Jacobs Theatre, Broadway		
2018	Edward Albee's At Home at the Zoo	Ann in Homelife	Signature Theatre Company, Off-Broadway		
2023	The Thanksgiving Play	Logan	Helen Hayes Theater, Broadway		

== Awards and nominations ==
Awards and nominations
Year	Award	Category	Recipient	Result	Ref.
2002	Drama Desk Awards	Outstanding Featured Actress in a Play	Noises Off	Won	
2002	Outer Critics Circle Awards	Outstanding Featured Actress in a Play	Noises Off	Won	
2002	Tony Awards	Best Featured Actress in a Play	Noises Off	Won	
2010	Drama Desk Awards	Outstanding Featured Actress in a Musical	Promises, Promises	Won	
2010	Outer Critics Circle Award	Outstanding Featured Actress in a Musical	Promises, Promises	Won	
2010	Tony Awards	Best Featured Actress in a Musical	Promises, Promises	Won	
