= Glyn Kerslake =

British actor (born 1967)

Glyn Kerslake is a British actor who was born in 1967 in Devon. He trained as an actor at Arts Educational Schools, London. He has had an extensive career spanning more than 30 years playing leading roles in the West End and regional theatres nationwide, and has been a soloist in many orchestral concerts and radio broadcasts.

Glyn is well known for appearing in two West End shows at once. He spent a year in Les Misérables playing the role of Enjolras and at the same time was performing the role of Arnaud du Thil at certain performances of Martin Guerre just down the road at the Prince Edward Theatre. Glyn was also understudying the role of Jean Valjean whilst playing Enjolras. When he was required to step on and play Jean Valjean in February 1997, he became the only actor ever to have played three principal roles in one week - in two separate West End musicals - on three consecutive nights. He still holds this record.

== Career ==
After leaving Arts Educational School, Glyn appeared in Evita at Manchester Opera House and then in Evita's first ever national tour. Glyn made his West End debut in the company of Les Misérables at the Palace Theatre in 1988. He then joined Miss Saigon, the original cast, at Theatre Royal, Drury Lane in 1989. He later became Alternate Chris. Following this he played the leading role of Joe Gillis in Sunset Boulevard at the Adelphi Theatre. His other West End credits include Bob Cratchit in Scrooge (London Palladium), Arnaud Du Tihl in Martin Guerre (Prince Edward Theatre), Joe Josephson in Merrily We Roll Along (Harold Pinter Theatre) and in 1998 Glyn played the iconic role of The Phantom of the Opera in The Phantom of the Opera at Her Majesty's Theatre.

Other London credits include: Joe Josephson in Merrily We Roll Along (Menier Chocolate Factory), Papa in Road Show (Menier Chocolate Factory), John Wilkes Booth in Assassins (Union Theatre), Closer Than Ever (Landor Theatre), Kern Goes to Hollywood (The Kings Head), Sentimental Journey (Wilton's Music Hall), The Metropolitan Mikardo (Royal Festival Hall).

Tours and repertory credits include: The Three Phantoms (UK national tour), Alternate Ché in Evita (1st UK National tour), The Wolf / Cinderella's Prince in Into the Woods (Manchester Library Theatre & Derby Playhouse), John in The Hired Man (Salisbury Playhouse), Dr Manislav in Two Cities (Salisbury Playhouse), Long John Silver in Treasure Island (Derby Playhouse), The Prince in Snow White (Manchester Opera House), Neil Armstrong in Moon Landing (Derby Playhouse), Captain Georg von Trapp in The Sound of Music (Aberystwyth Arts Centre), Vinnie in The Odd Couple (The Mill at Sonning), Dick in Birthday Suite (The Mill at Sonning), And the World Goes 'Round (European premiere, Leeds Playhouse), Side by Side by Sondheim (Olympia Theatre, Dublin).

== Concert and radio work ==
In 1989 Glyn appeared in Celebrating Sondheim at the Royal Festival Hall which was released on BBC Music.

Other Radio and Concert Credits include: Friday Night is Music Night (regular guest, BBC Radio 2), Songs From The Shows (BBC Radio 2), David Jacobs (BBC Radio 2), Ned Sherrin's Loose Ends (BBC Radio 4), Radio Rhapsody (BBC Radio 3), Mick Batt's Master Class (Classic FM), Celebrating Sondheim (BBC Radio 2), Celebration of Cole Porter (RTE Dublin), The Wonderful World of Sondheim with John Wilson (Bridgewater Hall with The Hallé Orchestra), Miss Saigon in Concert (Hong Kong Symphony Orchestra, Hong Kong National Concert Hall).

== Recordings ==
Glyn has appeared on many cast recordings and albums including A Night at the Musicals with the Royal Philharmonic Orchestra, the original cast album of Miss Saigon, the Les Misérables 10th Anniversary Concert, the cast recording of Scrooge with Tommy Steele in the title role and selected tracks on Best of Broadway Glyn has also recorded an album called Don't Judge an album by its Cover. He accompanied Linzi Hateley on her album For The First Time and wrote songs for her album Sooner or Later.

== Salisbury Playhouse ==
Glyn has had a long association with Salisbury Playhouse as a musical director and arranger and composer. He has collaborated as a composer with artistic director Gareth Machin on two original musical productions: The Night Before Christmas and Little Robin Redbreast.

His musical directing credits for Salisbury Playhosue include: With A Song In My Heart, Let's Misbehave, London Calling, Come Fly With Me, Cinderella, The Night Before Christmas, A Little of What You Fancy.
