= Wonderfalls =

2004 comedy-drama television series

- Promotional photo. Left to right: Neil Grayston, William Sadler, Diana Scarwid, Tracie Thoms, Tyron Leitso, Katie Finneran, Caroline Dhavernas, Lee Pace
- Genre: Comedy drama Fantasy
- Created by: Todd Holland; Bryan Fuller
- Starring: Caroline Dhavernas; Katie Finneran; Tyron Leitso; Lee Pace; William Sadler; Diana Scarwid; Tracie Thoms
- Opening theme: "I Wonder Why the Wonderfalls" by Andy Partridge
- Country of origin: United States
- Original language: English
- No. of seasons: 1
- No. of episodes: 13

Production
- Executive producers: Bryan Fuller; Todd Holland; Tim Minear
- Production locations: Ontario, Canada
- Running time: 42 minutes
- Production companies: Living Dead Guy Productions; Walking Bud Productions; Regency Television; 20th Century Fox Television

Original release
- Network: Fox
- Release: March 12 – April 1, 2004

Wonderfalls is an American fantasy comedy drama television series created by Todd Holland and Bryan Fuller. The series premiered on Fox on March 12, 2004, and only four episodes were aired before Fox canceled the show in April 2004 due to low ratings. The remaining nine episodes were later aired on Canadian network VisionTV beginning in November 2004 when it acquired all 13 episodes. The entire series was released on DVD in 2005.

The show centers on Jaye Tyler (Caroline Dhavernas), a recent Brown University graduate with a philosophy degree, who holds a dead-end job as a sales clerk at a Niagara Falls gift shop. Jaye is the reluctant participant in conversations with various animal figurines – a wax lion, brass monkey, stuffed bear, and mounted fish, among others – which direct her via oblique instructions to help people in need.

TV Guide included the series in their 2013 list of 60 shows that were "Cancelled Too Soon".

== Cast and characters ==
=== Main characters ===
- Caroline Dhavernas as Jaye Tyler – A 24-year-old graduate of Brown University who, at the start of the series, is discontentedly working as a salesclerk at Wonderfalls Gift Emporium and living in a trailer. She avoids her loving – and overbearing – family, whose successes she seems determined not to emulate, spending most of her time at The Barrel, a local bar at which her best friend, Mahandra, is a cocktail waitress. Despite her being extremely caustic and a deliberate underachiever, Jaye's life takes an odd turn when various muses, in the form of animal objects, begin talking to her and delivering cryptic instructions. At first uncooperative, Jaye eventually breaks down after they inflict on her various forms of passive coercion, such as keeping her awake all night by singing and harassing her with their messages when she is around others, forcing her to accede in order to avoid appearing crazy. Jaye's attempts to ignore or go against the messages often result in unexpected misfortunes, such as when Jaye's father is hit by a car. Jaye's guilt over the event leads to her following the muses' instructions throughout the rest of the episode, only to discover that her father's injury was, in fact, a blessing, as it led his doctors to discover a potentially life-threatening blood clot. As the series progresses, Jaye becomes more willing to follow the muses' instructions, although she fights them when they make her do things she does not like, such as driving Eric back into the arms of his wife. Through the course of the series, Jaye undergoes a subtle yet discernible personality shift as the good deeds she unwillingly performs begin to affect the way she perceives the world around her.
- Katie Finneran as Sharon Tyler – The eldest of the Tyler siblings, Sharon is an immigration lawyer and the most ambitious member of the family. Sharon constantly finds herself having to help Jaye – particularly when she has legal trouble – even though there is a strong degree of animosity between the sisters at the start of the series. To Jaye, Sharon is everything she does not want to be: goal- and career-oriented, constantly seeking their parents' approval, extremely high-strung, and apparently with little enjoyment of her life. Meanwhile, Jaye's constant pranks and somewhat callous disregard for her sister have made Sharon highly resentful. In the first episode, when Jaye discovers Sharon's "big secret" (that she is a lesbian), they admit that despite their animosity, they do love each other. Jaye not only keeps Sharon's secret from everyone else, but she also helps her out on occasion when someone (particularly their parents) comes close to discovering the truth. In turn, despite great shows of reluctance, Sharon always helps Jaye when she needs it and even comforts Jaye when she is in despair over Eric.
- Tyron Leitso as Eric Gotts – Jaye's love interest – is introduced in "Wax Lion" under unusual circumstances: Six days prior to the events of the pilot, Eric arrived in Niagara Falls for his honeymoon with his new wife, Heidi. Upon returning to their hotel suite one day, he discovered Heidi "servicing" a hotel bellman. Anguished, he retreated to The Barrel and sat and drank for three straight days, after which the owner offered him a bartending job. Extremely sweet, thoughtful, and kind, Eric is the antithesis of Jaye's often-abrasive personality, although he seems intrigued by her brashness and convinced that she is not as uncaring as she claims to be. Although his interest in Jaye is reciprocated, his light flirtation is often rebuffed because of Jaye's fears that she is going crazy, his status as a married man, and Jaye's deeply rooted fear that she will hurt him. Toward the end of the series, Eric's wife Heidi arrives in Niagara in an attempt to win back her husband. Despite having fallen in love with Jaye, her refusal to admit her feelings (caused by the warnings of the muses rather than her own inclination) leads him to remarry Heidi and decide to leave Niagara. In the final episode, Jaye is held hostage by a bank robber at Wonderfalls; because of deep feelings for Jaye, Eric is able to interpret her coolness toward him as an indication that something is wrong and alerts the police. Eric's explanation of why his suspicions were aroused in an interview on the local news finally convinces Heidi that there is no hope for her marriage to Eric. At the end of the final episode, he returns from New Jersey to Niagara, having divorced Heidi. His explanation helps Jaye to understand that the muses' warnings regarding Eric were in order to allow him to come to terms with his relationship with Heidi and end things with her properly.
- Lee Pace as Aaron Tyler – Jaye's brother. Aaron is a PhD student of comparative religions and the only one of the Tyler siblings still living at home. Aaron is the most easygoing of his siblings, exhibiting a laconic attitude toward his family and toward Mahandra's tension over their burgeoning relationship (although her refusal to acknowledge it does not seem to deflect his interest in her or in legitimizing their relationship). Although they constantly bicker, it is clear that Aaron and Jaye are close (Jaye even asks Sharon at one point if she is angry that Jaye and Aaron like each other better than they like her). Aaron is the only one during the series who learns of the full extent of Jaye's communications with the muses, a result of his worry over her strange behavior. Although he first believes that she is crazy, and despite being a self-proclaimed atheist, when things that the muses tell her start coming true, Aaron begins indulging his sister's claims, even to the extent of helping her try to rid herself of all the animals that have talked to her. Eventually, Aaron reluctantly suffers a sort of existential crisis when, during a session with Dr. Ron, a cow creamer that had communicated with Jaye mysteriously seems to prove that they really have been talking to his sister. When Jaye asks him to gather all of the animals, he attempts to talk to them himself, exhibiting a desire to be proven wrong about his belief that there is no higher power.
- William Sadler as Darrin Tyler – A highly respected physician, and Jaye, Sharon, and Aaron's father. Darrin is a loving father to his children, meddling particularly in Jaye's life, as he worries that she is not doing anything to reach her potential. He bails both Jaye and Yvette out of jail in the episode "Crime Dog". When Jaye apologizes for making him compromise his political beliefs, he tells her that family comes first and even expresses gratitude toward Jaye for hitting him with her car (because it was discovered that he had a potentially fatal blood clot in his leg). Like his wife, Darrin shows constant support to Jaye, even though he is clearly worried that she is not sharing with them what is going on with her.
- Diana Scarwid as Karen Tyler – The Tyler siblings' mother. Beautiful and very popular as a successful writer of bestselling travel book guides, Karen is friends with more of Jaye's high school classmates than Jaye herself was. Karen's deep love and concern for her children often manifests as criticism and a lack of respect for their personal space – in the "Crime Dog" episode, Jaye challenges Aaron with the information that Karen goes through his things when he is not home. It is clear that Karen is devoted to her family and particularly worried about her youngest daughter. Jaye even jokes that Karen had a tracking device installed in her at birth, thus never allowing Jaye to escape her family. Karen often questions whether Jaye's "problems" are a result of her and Darrin's parenting and clearly wants Jaye to open up to her. Often, Karen and Darrin's attempts to show their support result in annoying Jaye; despite that, Jaye recognizes that her mother not only loves her but is capable of great insight and compassion – particularly toward the people she loves.
- Tracie Thoms as Mahandra McGinty – Jaye's best friend since childhood. Mahandra is a cocktail waitress at The Barrel and a co-worker of Eric's. Like Jaye, she has a sarcastic, dry sense of humor and a vengeful streak – particularly when first encountering a despised former high school classmate in the episode "Pink Flamingos" or in "Barrel Bear" perceiving Jaye's attempts to help the rival of a woman Mahandra has aligned herself with, as a mockery of Mahandra's hometown pride. Mahandra often functions as her friend's voice of reason, even to the extent of warning Jaye away from Eric, fearing that her friend will only break his heart. Despite her often blunt manner, she and Jaye have always considered her to be "the nice one" in their friendship. Later in the series, Mahandra begins a secret relationship with Jaye's brother, Aaron, which she desperately tries to conceal from Jaye and the rest of the Tyler family. The relationship is "outed" in the episode "Caged Bird" when Jaye is taken hostage at the store. Fearing for her friend's safety, Mahandra hurries to Wonderfalls but stops short of approaching Jaye during the aftermath. When Aaron sees her, she breaks down, and Jaye and the other Tylers see them kissing.

=== Recurring characters ===
- Jewel Staite as Heidi Socket-Gotts – Eric's estranged wife. Heidi makes her first full appearance in the series in the episode "Safety Canary" when she arrives in Niagara in an attempt to win Eric back. Although she presents to Eric a repentant and loving front, she deliberately manipulates him to suit her purposes – faking amnesia and slipping him male-enhancement drugs in an attempt to get him to sleep with her. She hates Jaye, perceiving her as a threat to her relationship with Eric. Although Eric seems to recognize Heidi's manipulations, Jaye's inability to confess how she feels for him eventually drives him back to his wife. When Heidi sees Eric on a news report explaining how he knew to alert the police to the hostage situation in "Caged Bird", she begins to realize that although Eric might forgive her, he is truly in love with Jaye. On her way to tell Eric that she is giving up him and their marriage, Heidi collides with the van in which Jaye is being held hostage. This action causes the bank robber who has taken Jaye to be hit by an ambulance, saving Jaye's life. Although in the aftermath of the hostage events, it appears that Eric and Heidi have reconciled and returned to New Jersey to begin their life together, Eric reveals later that he only went to help her get settled and to close the book on their marriage by getting a divorce.
- Neil Grayston as Alec "Mouthbreather" – Jaye's co-worker. A large part of Jaye's animosity toward Alec is that although he is still in high school, he is now her boss and does not hesitate to order her around. She also resents that he was promoted over her. Despite his attempts to be assertive over Jaye, she generally ignores him.
- Chelan Simmons as Gretchen Speck-Horowitz – one of Jaye's former classmates. Gretchen later makes an appearance on Fuller's TV series Hannibal in a 2013 episode.

== Production ==
The series was an American production, filmed in Niagara Falls, Ontario and Toronto, Ontario (standing in for Niagara Falls, New York and environs), with several Canadian actors cast in lead roles (including the show's star). It was created by Bryan Fuller and Todd Holland and executive produced in partnership with Tim Minear. Originally scheduled to debut in the fall of 2003, its premiere was delayed until early 2004. When it finally debuted in March 2004 on the FOX network, Wonderfalls received positive reviews from critics, but had trouble attracting viewers. The pilot episode, "Wax Lion", received a higher Nielsen rating when it was repeated the Thursday after its premiere, and the show was moved from a Friday-night time slot to Thursday. There was little notice or promotion of the time change, and FOX subsequently canceled the show after airing the fourth episode. A fifth episode was advertised but never aired.

Despite its cancellation, Wonderfalls developed a loyal fan base. A campaign spearheaded by fans, with an accompanying website, was launched, and several members of the cast and crew visited the site and encouraged the grassroots support.

Immediately after the show's cancellation, its producers attempted to interest other networks, including The WB, in picking up the series and some episodes were shown in theatres in Los Angeles during the summer of 2004 in order to raise support for the series.

=== Planned episodes ===
Although the show's creators had intended for the 13 episodes of Wonderfalls to tell a standalone story, they discussed plans for second and third seasons in an interview and episode commentaries featured on the 2005 DVD release of the series. Among the projected storylines mentioned on the DVD:

- In the second season, Jaye's therapist would document their sessions, eventually publishing a book on her, which would lead to her being institutionalized with "Joan of Arc Syndrome" in the third season. Once institutionalized, she would begin to affect the lives of the other residents there.
- An accidental-pregnancy plotline was also planned for Jaye's sister Sharon. Having slept with her girlfriend Beth, who had just slept with her ex-husband, in the first season, Sharon would later find out that she was pregnant from him. This "miracle pregnancy" would solve one problem between Beth and her ex-husband: they could not have children.
- A new wax lion, one who was intact, would be introduced, who would advise Jaye against listening to what the original wax lion said.
- In the second season, Aaron would begin to regard his sister as a spiritual leader.
- The young boy (Spencer Breslin) who received a mail order bride from Russia in the episode "Lovesick Ass" would return in the opening of Season 3 in the same institution as Jaye, suffering from pyromania after Jaye broke his heart.

== Episodes ==
Fox aired the first four episodes out of sequence, although the episodes were produced in a different order than was intended for broadcast. The order below is how they are presented on the DVD release. The air dates for episodes 5–13 are when they first aired on television on VisionTV.

DVD order	Title	Directed by	Written by	Original release date	Prod. code	U.S. viewers (millions)
1	"Wax Lion"	Todd Holland	Story by : Todd Holland & Bryan Fuller; Teleplay by : Bryan Fuller	March 12, 2004	1AHM79	4.31
Jaye, an Ivy-league educated, underachieving retail employee, begins hearing voices from toy animals, who tell her to do things.
2	"Pink Flamingos"	Todd Holland	Gretchen J. Berg & Aaron Harberts	April 1, 2004	1AHM01	2.93
The voices tell Jaye to help a disliked high school classmate organize their high school reunion.
3	"Karma Chameleon"	Marita Grabiak	Tim Minear	March 19, 2004	1AHM10	3.68
Jaye helps a young woman who is down on her luck until she begins assuming Jaye's identity.
4	"Wound-Up Penguin"	Todd Holland	Liz W. Garcia	March 26, 2004	1AHM12	3.25
When Jaye encounters a nun (Carrie Preston) who has lost her faith, she shares her experiences with the talking animals with the nun who tries to perform an exorcism on her.
5	"Crime Dog"	Allan Kroeker	Krista Vernoff	November 1, 2004	1AHM02	N/A
When their illegal housekeeper is deported, a cow creamer's urging sends Jaye and Aaron to Canada to bring her back.
6	"Muffin Buffalo"	Craig Zisk	Gretchen J. Berg & Aaron Harberts	November 22, 2004	1AHM05	N/A
Jaye hates that her actions when listening to the voices are causing people to see her as a hero. Without any prodding from the animals, Jaye befriends a shut-in from the trailer park after she inadvertently hurts his feelings.
7	"Barrel Bear"	Jamie Babbit	Tim Minear & Bryan Fuller	November 8, 2004	1AHM03	N/A
Jaye helps a woman (Rue McClanahan) that people believe is the first woman to go over Niagara Falls in a barrel regain some of her celebrity, until another woman (Louise Fletcher) shows up saying that she actually went over the Falls in that barrel.
8	"Lovesick Ass"	Todd Holland	Dan E. Fesman & Harry Victor	November 15, 2004	1AHM04	N/A
Worried that she is not sane enough to enter a relationship, Jaye deflects Eric's advances while they work together to help a Russian mail-order bride whose prospective husband turns out to be a 13-year-old boy. The boy soon turns his romantic attention towards Jaye.
9	"Safety Canary"	Peter Lauer	Liz W. Garcia & Alexander Woo	November 29, 2004	1AHM06	N/A
Jaye is determined to turn her and Eric's first date into their last when she begins to realize that she is a maneater like both Mahandra and Aaron say. Kellie Waymire guest starred in this episode; she died shortly after filming, and the closing credits begin with the dedication "In memory of Kellie Waymire."
10	"Lying Pig"	Peter O'Fallon	Krista Vernoff & Abby Gewanter	December 6, 2004	1AHM07	N/A
While Eric's wife Heidi tries to win him back, Jaye tries to listen to the voice and stay out of the situation, even though it is difficult for her.
11	"Cocktail Bunny"	Todd Holland	Bryan Fuller	December 13, 2004	1AHM08	N/A
Upset that the voices told her to let Eric go back to Heidi, Jaye is looking for a reason to suspect Heidi of wrongdoing. She misreads the signs that the voices give her, which leads to her alienating Eric but saving the life of her psychologist.
12	"Totem Mole"	Jeremy Podeswa	Harry Victor & Dan E. Fesman	December 20, 2004	1AHM09	N/A
While visiting an Indian reservation, Jaye encounters the spirit of a holy woman, who she thinks can help silence the animal voices forever.
13	"Caged Bird"	Michael Lehmann	Krista Vernoff	December 27, 2004	1AHM11	N/A
A bank robber takes Jaye, Sharon, and some of the gift shop employees hostage just as Jaye and Eric are supposed to meet to say a final goodbye. Circumstances of the crime provide life-saving treatment for the security guard. As the episode and series ends Eric has moved back to Niagara Falls and Jaye and Eric kiss.

There is an alternate version of the first episode "Wax Lion". It features Kerry Washington playing Mahandra and Adam Scott playing Aaron. On the DVD commentary, the creators state that both actors had to be replaced because they could not commit to future episodes. The alternate version omits Thomas telling Jaye at the end that he is going to marry the nurse. The scene was added because the network wanted the Thomas subplot resolved, even though the creators disliked the scene. It also omits a scene where Jaye throws a quarter into the fountain before any muses start talking to her. The network supposedly wanted an impetus for why the muses started talking.

== Reception ==
On Rotten Tomatoes, the series has an approval rating of 76% with an average score of 8.3 out of 10 based on 17 reviews. The website's critical consensus reads, "Although the premise couldn't sustain the show beyond a single season, Wonderfalls' deadpan protagonist and witty dialogue offer a distinctive take on twentysomething angst."

== Broadcast and syndication ==
Select unaired episodes were screened in July 2004 at San Diego Comic-Con and at the Knitting Factory in Los Angeles. All 13 episodes of Wonderfalls were aired to completion for the first time on Canada's VisionTV beginning in October 2004.

Wonderfalls was aired by the digital cable network Logo TV beginning in July 2005. Also in July 2005, the British network Sky1 aired the series to completion, though not in the original intended episode order.

The Museum of Television and Radio held a two-day screening of the entire series on January 29 and 30, 2005.

== Home media release ==
20th Century Fox released the complete series DVD set on February 1, 2005. The DVD set includes all 13 episodes; six commentary tracks by creators Todd Holland and Bryan Fuller, and actors Caroline Dhavernas and Katie Finneran on "Wax Lion", "Crime Dog", "Lovesick Ass", "Safety Canary", "Cocktail Bunny" (with Scotch Ellis Loring) and "Caged Bird"; a behind-the-scenes documentary, an examination of the show's visual effects, and one of two music videos produced for the theme song, "I Wonder Why the Wonderfalls" by Andy Partridge.
