= Company (Broadway song) =

Song from the Broadway musical, Company

"Company" is the title song from the Broadway musical, Company. It was written by Stephen Sondheim. The song is the show's introductory song. It is sung by the main character, Robert, and the full company in the first act, and reprised in a curtain call finale.

== Motifs ==
One of Sondheim's lesser-performed songs, "Company" relies heavily on rhythm and tempo with a simple melody, driven by a rock beat. The motif used throughout the entire score of Company debuts here, inspired by a telephone's “busy” signal. [The busy signal is used in recordings of the song]). The “Bobby, Bobby bubi, Robby, Robert darling” motif is a pulse of staccato and repetitive sound voiced by the show's couples—first calling to Robert (the main character) by his legal name, and then by various nicknames and pet names—segueing into conversational exclamations and endearments. Then the entire chorus of “married friends” mutually invite Bobby to “come on over for dinner! We’ll be so glad to see you! Bobby come on over for dinner ... just be the three of us, only the three of us!”

== Lyrics ==
The song's main body is introduced in Robert's solo. The lyrics he sings describe everyday and comforting things associated with friends or “company:”

Robert's solo segues into the couples reiterating their endearments at length, making appointments with “Robert, Bobby, Robbie darling” for concerts, blind double dates, the opera, exclaiming in chorus the questions and, simultaneously, voicing the many loving concerns typical among friends. And all of this escalates into a drawn-out, breathless “We Looovvveee You,” climaxing as the main character and his “company” echo their mutual sentiments. The couples and their unmarried friend all agree that the labors and gestures affiliated with company are glorious.

== Themes ==
“Company” is a multi-level choral number, a positive testament to the good things in life. With the exception of hating the opera, no pessimistic or negative sentiment infiltrates the song. The lyrics include “With love filling the days. With love seventy ways.” Typical for a Sondheim opening number since A Funny Thing Happened on the Way to the Forum, “Company” sets the tone for a modern musical comedy with a mature theme that is a commentary of his era's adult problems. The entire score follows this song's sentiments. "Company" dissects the cacophony of a room full of chatterers and organizes it into song form.
