= Merrily We Roll Along (musical) =

1981 musical by Stephen Sondheim and George Furth

- Windowcard for the original Broadway production
- Music: Stephen Sondheim
- Lyrics: Stephen Sondheim
- Book: George Furth
- Basis: Merrily We Roll Along by: George S. Kaufman; Moss Hart
- Premiere: November 16, 1981: Alvin Theatre, New York City, New York
- Productions: 1981 Broadway; 1985 San Diego; 1994 Off-Broadway; 2000 Off-West End; 2012 Off-West End revival; 2013 West End; 2019 Off-Broadway revival; 2022 Off-Broadway revival; 2023 Broadway revival
- Awards: Drama Desk Award for Outstanding Lyrics; Laurence Olivier Award for Best New Musical; Laurence Olivier Award for Best Musical Revival; Tony Award for Best Revival of a Musical

Merrily We Roll Along is a musical with music and lyrics by Stephen Sondheim and a book by George Furth. It is based on the 1934 play of the same name by George S. Kaufman and Moss Hart.

The show tells the story of how three friends' lives and friendship devolve over the course of 20 years; it focuses particularly on Franklin Shepard, a talented composer of musicals who, over those 20 years, abandons his friends and songwriting career to become a producer of Hollywood movies. Like the play on which it is based, the show's story moves in reverse chronology, beginning in 1976 at the friends' lowest moment and ending in 1957, at their youthful best.

Merrily premiered on Broadway on November 16, 1981, in a production directed by frequent Sondheim collaborator Hal Prince, with a cast almost exclusively of teenagers and young adults. However, the show was not the success the previous Sondheim–Prince collaborations had been: after a chaotic series of preview performances, it opened to widely negative reviews, and closed after 16 performances and 44 previews.

In subsequent years, the show has been extensively rewritten and enjoyed several notable productions, including an Off-Broadway revival in 1994 and a West End premiere in 2000 that won the Laurence Olivier Award for Best New Musical. The 2022 Off-Broadway production staged at New York Theatre Workshop transferred to Broadway in fall 2023, starring Jonathan Groff, Daniel Radcliffe, and Lindsay Mendez and directed by Maria Friedman. It won four Tony Awards, including Best Revival of a Musical. A film adaptation starring Paul Mescal, Beanie Feldstein, and Ben Platt is currently in production and is being filmed over the course of 20 years, having begun in 2019.

== Synopsis ==
This is a synopsis of the current, revised version of the show since the 1994 York Theatre production, not the original one performed on Broadway in 1981. The plot revolves around Frank Shepard, a famous songwriter and eventual film producer ("Overture/Merrily We Roll Along"). Moving backwards across 20 years, the show details Frank's rise from a penniless dreamy-eyed composer to a wealthy film-producing sell-out, and what he lost to get there.

=== Act I ===
In 1976, the charismatic Frank Shepard hosts an opening-night party of Hollywood insiders, along with his mistress and star of his new film, Meg, who all lavishly praise him ("That Frank"). Frank initially seems jovial but tenses when a partygoer mentions Charley Kringas, Frank's former best friend and musical collaborator. His oldest remaining friend, theatre critic Mary Flynn, attends the party too but is disgusted by the other guests' shallowness and Frank's abandonment of music: his true talent. Becoming more and more jaded, Mary finally gives a drunken toast, castigating Frank and his guests, before storming out. Frank's wife Gussie arrives, angry that Meg landed the film role over her, and reveals she knows he is cheating on her with Meg. He admits that he has pursued financial success at the expense of his values and loved ones. Gussie viciously splashes iodine in Meg's face and declares her and Frank's marriage over.

The years roll back to 1973 ("First Transition"), when Frank and Charley are about to be interviewed in a New York television studio. Mary greets the bitter Charley backstage, who says Frank rarely makes time to collaborate anymore. Mary tries to soothe him by explaining she set up this interview to force Frank to publicly commit to the show the two men have been planning for years. She is nostalgic ("Old Friends – Like It Was"), and Charley is shocked that, even after 16 years, Mary clearly remains in love with Frank. Frank belatedly arrives with his new wife Gussie, who is trying to avoid lending money to her ex-husband: washed-up Broadway producer Joe. Frank is nervous to tell Charley that he has signed a three-picture deal, but the interviewer lets the news slip right before they go live on air, during which Charley launches into a sardonic rant on Frank's shift from music towards money, before urging the audience to keep Frank committed to his piano ("Franklin Shepard, Inc."). Once the interview ends, a disgusted Frank declares Charley has betrayed him, and ends their friendship despite Charley’s apology and Mary's protests.

In 1968, Mary and Charley surprise Frank in his new apartment on Central Park West ("Second Transition") with Frank's young son, Frankie, whom he has not seen since his contentious divorce from his first wife. Frank wants to option a film version of his and Charley's stage show Musical Husbands to pay for the divorce, but, when Charley passionately objects, Mary calms her friends' tensions ("Old Friends"). Frank's producer Joe and Joe's wife Gussie arrive with champagne which Mary, a teetotaler at this time, refuses. Everyone is aware that Frank and Gussie are having an affair except Mary who, appalled to now realize this, gulps down the champagne. After everyone leaves, Frank plays an old song on his piano and attempts to make sense of his choices. On the verge of composing a new piece, he is interrupted when Gussie returns, announcing that she intends to leave Joe and commit to Frank ("Growing Up").

In 1967 ("Third Transition"), Frank and his first wife Beth are fighting over custody of their son Frankie in a courthouse. Reporters flock around, eager to catch gossip since Gussie has been subpoenaed. Frank confronts Beth, who still loves him but cannot live with him knowing he was unfaithful to her with Gussie ("Not a Day Goes By"). Beth drags their son away, heading to Texas to live with her father. Frank collapses in despair but is consoled by Mary, Charley, and his other remaining friends who try to convince him that this is the "best thing that ever could have happened" ("Now You Know").

=== Act II ===
In 1964, Gussie is performing a song on the opening night of Musical Husbands: Frank and Charley's first Broadway show ("Gussie's Opening Number"). The curtain comes down on the show and, as the audience applauds, Charley and Frank, backstage with Joe, Mary, and Beth, are ecstatic to learn the show is a hit ("It's a Hit!"). Charley's wife is in labor, and before he and Beth rush to the hospital, Mary begs Beth to stay behind so that Frank will not be left alone with Gussie. Beth says she trusts her husband and departs.

In 1962 ("Fourth Transition"), Frank, Beth, Charley, and Mary have been invited to a party at Gussie and Joe's elegant Sutton Place apartment, where they stand starstruck by the influential crowd ("The Blob"). Deliberately spilling wine on Beth's dress, Gussie pulls Frank away from the partygoers, confiding her unhappiness to him, and convinces him to write the commercial show Joe is producing, Musical Husbands, rather than the political satire he and Charley are trying to get produced ("Growing Up" (Reprise)). Returning to her guests, she invites the songwriters to perform their latest song, "Good Thing Going". The guests love it and Gussie implores them to do an encore, but the guests quickly lose interest and resume their noisy cocktail chatter ("The Blob" (Reprise)). Charley storms out as Mary looks on worriedly.

In 1960 ("Fifth Transition"). Charley, Frank, and Beth are performing at a small nightclub in Greenwich Village, with Mary lending a hand. Trying to appear bright and sophisticated, they perform a song celebrating America's new First Family ("Bobby and Jackie and Jack"). Joe is in the tiny audience and is quite impressed, as is his new fiancée and former secretary Gussie. After the show, Frank explains to them that he and Beth are marrying. It becomes clear that the wedding is due to her pregnancy, but Frank professes his happiness anyway. With Mary, Charley, and Beth's disapproving parents looking on, the happy couple exchanges vows as a lovelorn Mary tries to swallow her feelings for Frank ("Not a Day Goes By" (Reprise)).

In 1958 to 1959 ("Sixth Transition"), Frank, Charley, and Mary are busy in New York, working their way up the career ladder, taking any job they can and working feverishly on their songs, plays, and novels. Frank and Charley audition for Joe, but he wants more "hummable" tunes, and instructs them to leave their name with his secretary, Gussie. So they decide to do their own show and, in an ensuing montage, audition and hire Beth, forming a cabaret show together ("Opening Doors").

In 1957 ("Seventh Transition"), early one morning, college-attending Frank and Charley are on the roof of an apartment building on New York City's 110th Street, waiting to spot the first-ever Earth-orbiting satellite, Sputnik. Frank tells Charley how much he likes Charley's plays and proposes that they turn one, a political satire, into a musical. Mary, their neighbor, arrives to view the satellite, and meets the boys for the first time. She has heard Frank's piano from her apartment, and tells him how much she admires his music. He speaks of how much composing means to him. Suddenly, Sputnik appears in the sky, and now, for the young friends, anything is possible ("Our Time").

=== Differences from the original Broadway version ===
The original 1981 version had much the same plot as the revised version, with a few notable differences. The original version begins and ends with an actor playing an older Frank giving a cynical speech to a group of high school graduates, who play the characters in the rest of the show. At the end, he joins with his younger self in a symbol of hope. "That Frank" replaced a song called "Rich and Happy", which had a more childish view of Hollywood parties. Both instances of "Growing Up" were also not present, and the "Old Friends" scene ended with Mary drinking. "Not a Day Goes By" was originally sung by Frank; "Now You Know" and "It's a Hit" had different lyrics, and the ensemble was composed of a different set of characters. In the scene with "It's a Hit", Beth is the one who is pregnant instead of Charley's wife. There was also an additional scene, between "Rich and Happy" and "Franklin Shepard, Inc.", in which Mary attempts to bring Charley and Frank together at a restaurant to reconcile. This scene, and the song "Like it Was", were folded into the following scene in the revised version. Aside from these changes, the two versions are mostly the same.

== Musical numbers ==
=== Current songlist ===
Act I

- Overture – Orchestra
- "Merrily We Roll Along" – Company
- "That Frank" – Franklin Shepard, Mary Flynn and Guests
- "First Transition" – Company
- "Old Friends" (Part I) – Mary and Charley Kringas
- "Like It Was" – Mary
- "Franklin Shepard, Inc." – Charley
- "Second Transition" – Company
- "Old Friends" (Part II) – Mary, Franklin and Charley
- "Growing Up" (Part I) – Franklin
- "Growing Up" (Part II) - Gussie
- "Third Transition" – Company
- "Not a Day Goes By" – Beth
- "Now You Know" – Mary and Company

Act II

- Entr'acte – Orchestra
- "Act Two Opening" – Gussie
- "It's a Hit" – Franklin, Charley, Mary, Joe and Beth
- "Fourth Transition" – Company
- "The Blob" – Gussie and Company
- "Growing Up" (Part II) – Gussie
- "Good Thing Going" – Charley
- "The Blob" (Part II) – Company
- "Fifth Transition" – Company
- "Bobby and Jackie and Jack" – Charley, Beth, Franklin and Pianist
- "Not a Day Goes By" (Reprise) – Beth, Franklin and Mary
- "Sixth Transition" – Company
- "Opening Doors" – Franklin, Charley, Mary, Joe and Beth
- "Seventh Transition" – Franklin Shepard Jr., Beth and Mrs. Spencer
- "Our Time" – Franklin, Charley, Mary and Company
- Exit Music – Orchestra

=== Original Broadway songlist (1981) ===
Act I

- "The Hills of Tomorrow" – Company
- "Merrily We Roll Along" – Company
- "Rich and Happy" – Franklin Shepard and Guests
- "Merrily We Roll Along" – Company
- "Old Friends" – Mary, Charley
- "Like It Was" – Mary
- "Franklin Shepard, Inc." – Charley Kringas
- "Merrily We Roll Along," (Reprise) – Company
- "Old Friends" (Reprise) – Franklin, Charley and Mary
- "Merrily We Roll Along" (Reprise) – Company
- "Not a Day Goes By" – Franklin
- "Now You Know" – Mary and Company

Act II

- "It's a Hit!" – Franklin, Mary, Charley and Joe
- "Merrily We Roll Along" (Reprise) – Company
- "Good Thing Going" – Charley and Franklin
- "Merrily We Roll Along" (Reprise) – Company
- "Bobby and Jackie and Jack" – Charley, Beth, Franklin and Ted
- "Not a Day Goes By" (Reprise) – Franklin and Mary
- "Opening Doors" – Franklin, Charley, Mary, Joe and Beth
- "Our Time" – Franklin, Charley, Mary and Company
- "The Hills of Tomorrow" (Reprise) – Company

== Background and original production ==
The idea for Merrily originated from a suggestion by Hal Prince's wife, Judy, that he do a show about teenagers; he decided that a musical version of the 1934 George S. Kaufman/Moss Hart play Merrily We Roll Along would be a good fit, and when he called Sondheim about the idea, Sondheim "said yes on the phone".

The original play tells the story of "Richard Niles, who is revealed on the opening night of his latest play [in 1934] to be a pretentious playwright of successful but forgettable light comedies", and over the course of the play, gradually moves backward in time until reaching "his college graduation [in 1916], quoting with all the fervor of idealistic youth the words of Polonius: 'This above all, to thine own self be true'." The play concerned, overall, "three friends, their artistic ambitions, the price of fame, and the changes in American society from World War I to the Depression".

For the musical adaptation, the story was revised to take place between 1955 and 1980, and the characters were changed: "Richard Niles", a playwright, was now Franklin Shepard, a composer; "Jonathan Crale", a painter, was now Charley Kringas, a lyricist and playwright; and "Julia Glenn", a novelist, was now Mary Flynn, a journalist and eventually a critic.

George Furth was brought on to write the musical's book, making Merrily a reunion for Sondheim, Furth, and Prince, who had all worked together on the landmark 1970 musical Company. Merrily premiered at the Alvin Theatre on Broadway, where Company had premiered.

As part of the original idea of doing a show about teenagers, and in order to, as theater historian Ken Mandelbaum put it, "enhance the ironies of the story", Prince cast the show entirely with teenagers and young adults, who played their characters in both youth and middle age. Prince and Sondheim had conceived of the show as "a vehicle for young performers", and Prince was also charmed by, as he said at the time, "the beginnings of [the cast's] artistry, the roughness of their craft, their inexperience. I was charmed as hell by that[.]"

The show's production design was also informed by this notion: the set consisted of a group of movable bleachers lined with lockers and a screen on which projections were shown "to set the mood and period". Prince's original idea for the staging had been to "have no scenery", but rather "racks of clothes and these kids would come in looking like little kids, and they would pretend to be their parents as they see them", but this was discarded due to Prince's perception of what Broadway audiences, paying Broadway prices, would accept from a show (as he later put it, "[G]uess what? I lacked the courage.")

Sondheim's score was a mix of the traditional and the unconventional. In basic form and sound, the songs were written in the style of traditional Broadway show music of the 1950s (where Merrily's story "began") and earlier, a clear departure from the musical complexity of his previous work. But the score was also written to embody the show's backward structure in its use and repetition of certain sections of music. For example, "Not a Day Goes By" is first heard in its "reprise", sung bitterly by Frank after his divorce from Beth, before being heard in its "original" form late in the second act, sung by Frank (as he gets married) and Mary (longingly watching Frank get married). Additionally, "Good Thing Going" is gradually deconstructed throughout the musical before reaching its final—but "initial"—form near the end of the show, as "Who Wants to Live in New York?". This technique was at times used, Sondheim said, to show how "the songs that had been important in the lives of the characters when they were younger would have different resonances as they aged"; he also used some of these musical repetitions to represent "undercurrents of memory" in the characters in their later years. Because of the strictures Sondheim applied to his writing, Merrily's score he felt was one of the most difficult of his career to write.

For budgetary reasons, Merrily did not get an out-of-town tryout production, and instead the production put on over 40 tryout performances—which were actually previews—on Broadway before the opening. The tryouts, beginning on October 8, 1981, had a poor reception, with audiences walking out. By October 21, The New York Times reported that original leading man James Weissenbach had been replaced by Jim Walton, who was initially cast as Jerome (who appeared in the role beginning October 19) and the Broadway opening had been postponed. Rehearsal choreographer Ron Field was replaced with Larry Fuller. The opening was delayed a second time, from November 9 to 16, 1981. Looking back on that "painful month", Sondheim recalled, "that month of fervent hysterical activity was the most fun I've ever had on a single show." By opening night, the production team "thought we'd fixed the show," but in retrospect, they had only "bettered it, not fixed it," and the critical response was "merciless".

During the preview process, songs were being rewritten or even cut entirely. The songs "Darling!", Sung by Gussie and Mary before "Old Friends", and "Thank You for Coming", Sung by Charlie, Beth, and Frank after "Bobby and Jackie and Jack" were both cut within the first 4 previews. Also cut was the song "Honey" Sung by Beth and Frank before "Not a Day Goes By (Reprise)" was cut within the 3rd week of previews.

The Broadway production, directed by Prince and choreographed by Fuller, opened on November 16, 1981, at the Alvin Theatre. It received mostly negative reviews. While the score was widely praised, critics and audiences alike felt that the book was problematic and the themes left a sour taste in their mouths. Hampered by several critical reviews published before its official opening, as well as more negative ones published afterward, it ran for 16 performances and 44 previews.

In his New York Times review, Frank Rich wrote, "As we all should probably have learned by now, to be a Stephen Sondheim fan is to have one's heart broken at regular intervals." Clive Barnes wrote, "Whatever you may have heard about it—go and see it for yourselves. It is far too good a musical to be judged by those twin kangaroo courts of word of mouth and critical consensus."

The cast included Jim Walton (Franklin Shepard), Lonny Price (Charley Kringas), Ann Morrison (Mary), Terry Finn (Gussie), Jason Alexander (Joe), Sally Klein (Beth), Geoffrey Horne (Franklin Shepard age 43), David Loud (Ted), Daisy Prince (Meg), Liz Callaway (Nightclub Waitress), Tonya Pinkins (Gwen), Abby Pogrebin (Evelyn), and Giancarlo Esposito (valedictorian). Judith Dolan designed costumes for the production.

The audience had trouble following the story. Consequently, the actors all ended up wearing sweatshirts with their characters' names. According to Meryle Secrest, "Prince ... dressed everyone in identical sweatshirts and pants. Then he had to add names emblazoned across the sweatshirts because the audience had difficulty telling the actors apart". Sondheim later remembered: "I rather liked it; the paying audience did not." The failure of Merrily meant the "glory days" of the Sondheim-Prince collaboration were over, and the two did not work together again until Bounce (2003).

== Subsequent production history ==
Throughout the years, with Furth's and Sondheim's permission, the musical has been staged with numerous changes. Sondheim has contributed new songs to several of the show's incarnations, most notably "Growing Up", added to the La Jolla 1985 production.

=== Off-Broadway ===
A "streamlined" off-Broadway revival, directed by Susan H. Schulman, opened on May 26, 1994, at the York Theatre in St. Peter's Church, and ran for 54 performances. The cast included Malcolm Gets as Frank, Adam Heller as Charley, and Amy Ryder as Mary. A cast recording was released by Varèse Sarabande.

Another off-Broadway revival, directed by Noah Brody with choreography by Lorin Latarro, began on January 12, 2019, opening February 19 and originally set to run to April 7, 2019 (extended to April 14, 2019), by Roundabout Theatre's resident company, Fiasco Theater, at the Laura Pels Theater. The reduced cast included Manu Narayan, Brittany Bradford, Jessie Austrian, Ben Steinfeld, Paul L. Coffey, and Emily Young.

=== San Diego and Washington D.C. ===
A production directed by James Lapine opened on June 16, 1985, at San Diego's La Jolla Playhouse, where it ran for 24 performances. The cast included John Rubinstein as Frank, Chip Zien as Charley, Marin Mazzie as Beth, and Heather MacRae as Mary.

An Arena Stage production, directed by Douglas C. Wager and choreographed by Marcia Milgrom Dodge, opened on January 30, 1990, at Washington, D.C.'s Kreeger Theater, where it ran slightly more than two months. The cast included Victor Garber, David Garrison, Becky Ann Baker and, as in San Diego, Marin Mazzie as Beth. In his review of the production, Frank Rich wrote, "Many of the major flaws of the 1981 Merrily, starting with its notorious gymnasium setting, have long since been jettisoned or rectified in intervening versions produced in La Jolla, Calif., and in Seattle." He called the score "exceptional".

=== United Kingdom ===
The UK premiere of Merrily We Roll Along was at the Guildhall School of Music and Drama on May 11, 1983. The first professional production in the UK was by the Library Theatre Company in Manchester in 1984, directed by Howard Lloyd Lewis and choreographed by Paul Kerryson.

Paul Kerryson directed a production of the show at the Haymarket Theatre, Leicester with orchestrations by Jonathan Tunick and music direction by Julian Kelly. The production opened on April 14, 1992, with a cast that included Michael Cantwell as Frank, Maria Friedman as Mary and Evan Pappas as Charlie. A cast recording of the production was released in 1994 which included extended cuts and dialogue. The show finally received its West End premiere at London's Donmar Warehouse on December 11, 2000, in a production directed by Michael Grandage, running for 71 performances following eight previews. The cast was led by Julian Ovenden as Frank, Samantha Spiro as Mary and Daniel Evans as Charley. Spiro and Evans received Olivier Awards for their performances, and the production received the Olivier for Best Musical.

Karen Hebden's production for Derby Playhouse in May 2007 featured Glyn Kerslake as Frank, Glenn Carter as Charley, Eliza Lumley as Mary, and Cheryl McAvoy as Beth.

Maria Friedman directed a revival of the musical at London's Menier Chocolate Factory, which opened on November 28, 2012, and transferred to the Harold Pinter Theatre in the West End on May 1, 2013. The production starred Mark Umbers as Frank, Jenna Russell as Mary and Damian Humbley as Charley. The revival won the Peter Hepple Award for Best Musical in the 2012 Critics' Circle Theatre Awards. It was filmed and broadcast to select cinemas in 2013.

=== Reunion concert ===
The original Broadway cast reunited to stage a concert version of the show for one night on September 30, 2002, with both Sondheim and Prince in attendance.

=== Encores! ===
An Encores! staged concert at New York City Center ran from February 8 to 19, 2012. This production was directed by James Lapine and starred Colin Donnell as Frank, Celia Keenan-Bolger as Mary, Lin-Manuel Miranda as Charley, Elizabeth Stanley as Gussie, and Betsy Wolfe as Beth. This version incorporated parts of revisions done for the 1985 La Jolla Playhouse production and 1990 and 1994 productions. Many members of the original production were invited to attend on February 14 and joined the Encores! cast and Sondheim on stage following the performance to sing "Old Friends".

=== 2022 Off-Broadway revival ===
An off-Broadway revival, directed by Maria Friedman and based on her prior staging at the Menier Chocolate Factory, ran at New York Theatre Workshop from November 21, 2022, to January 22, 2023, starring Jonathan Groff as Frank, Daniel Radcliffe as Charley, Lindsay Mendez as Mary, Krystal Joy Brown as Gussie, Katie Rose Clarke as Beth, and Reg Rogers as Joe.

=== 2023 Broadway revival ===
Theatrical release poster for the filmed version of the 2023 Broadway revival.

The Off-Broadway production transferred to Broadway for a limited engagement at the Hudson Theatre, with all six principal actors reprising their roles. Previews began September 19, opening on October 10, 2023, marking the musical's first Broadway revival since the original 1981 production. During its first week of previews, the show broke the house record at the Hudson Theatre and played to sold-out audiences, grossing over $1.3 million. The New York Times described the revival as "the first convincing revival" of the "cult flop," crediting the success to "Maria Friedman's unsparing direction and a thrillingly fierce central performance by Jonathan Groff.... With his immense charisma turned in on itself, he seems to sweat emotion: ambition, disappointment and, most frighteningly, a terrible frozen disgust." The production was extended until July 7, 2024, with the original cast. RadicalMedia, the same company that filmed the original cast of Hamilton for Disney+ and Come from Away for Apple TV+, announced it would be filming this production. Sony Pictures Classics acquired distribution rights to the filmed production, which was theatrically released on December 5, 2025, with a 145-minute runtime.

=== Other major productions ===
The first Australian professional production was presented by the Sydney Theatre Company at the Footbridge Theatre in May–July 1996. It featured Tom Burlinson, Tony Sheldon, Peta Toppano, Greg Stone and Gina Riley, and was directed by Wayne Harrison.

In 2002, the show ran for approximately 120 performances at the Shaw Festival in a production directed by Jackie Maxwell and featuring Tyley Ross as Frank, Jay Turvey as Charley and Jenny L. Wright as Mary.

As part of the Sondheim Celebration at the Kennedy Center, a limited engagement of 14 performances opened on July 12, 2002, at the Eisenhower Theater. The cast featured Michael Hayden (Frank), Miriam Shor (Mary), Raúl Esparza (Charley), Anastasia Barzee (Beth), and Emily Skinner (Gussie).

In September 2002, a concert production of Merrily We Roll Along was a part of the 2002-2003 Reprise! season. The production starred Hugh Panaro as Franklin, Kevin Chamberlin as Charley, Lea DeLaria as Mary, Teri Hatcher as Gussie, and Jean Louisa Kelly as Beth.

A Derby Playhouse production ran from April 19 to May 19, 2007, starring Glyn Kerslake, Glenn Carter and Eliza Lumley in the lead roles. A Signature Theatre (Arlington, Virginia) production, directed by Eric D. Schaeffer, opened on September 4, 2007, and ran through October 14, 2007. The production received four Helen Hayes Award nominations, with a win for Erik Liberman as Charley. John Doyle directed a production running at the Watermill Theatre, Newbury, Berkshire, from January 16, 2008, through March 8, 2008. It featured Sam Kenyon (Frank), Rebecca Jackson (Gussie), Elizabeth Marsh (Mary) and Thomas Padden (Charley).

Available Light Theatre (AVLT) presented the revised version at the Vern Riffe Center in Columbus, Ohio, from August 19, 2010, through September 4, 2010. It was directed by John Dranschak and featured Ian Short as Frank, Nick Lingnofski as Charley, and Heather Carvel as Mary. The musical director was Pam Welsh-Huggins. The Cincinnati Playhouse in the Park presented a revival directed by John Doyle, using the actor-musician concept, opening on March 3, 2012. The cast included Malcolm Gets (Frank), Daniel Jenkins (Charley), and Becky Ann Baker (Mary). This production used the 1994 York Theatre revisions.

Clwyd Theatr Cymru at Mold in North Wales performed the musical May 12 – June 2, 2012, directed by Nikolai Foster. PAN Productions staged Merrily We Roll Along in 2014 at the Kuala Lumpur Performing Arts Centre for the first time in South East Asia. Directed by Nell Ng with music direction by Nish Tham. This production featured Peter Ong (Frank), Aaron Teoh (Charley), Chang Fang Chyi (Mary), Nikki Palikat (Gussie), Stephanie Van Driesen (Beth), and Dennis Yeap (Joe).

Astoria Performing Arts Center produced an off-off-Broadway production in 2015 starring Jack Mosbacher as Frank, Ally Bonino as Mary, and Nicholas Park as Charley. The production won Outstanding Production of a Musical at the 2015 New York Innovative Theatre Awards.

The Wallis Annenberg Center for The Performing Arts in Beverly Hills staged a production from November 23 to December 18, 2016. Directed by Michael Arden, the production starred Aaron Lazar as Frank, Wayne Brady as Charley, and Donna Vivino as Mary.

The Huntington Theatre Company produced Maria Friedman's version in Boston, running from September 8 to October 15, 2017. Umbers and Humbley reprised their roles from the London production, with Eden Espinosa joining as Mary.

The Hayes Theatre in Sydney staged a production directed by Dean Bryant which was intended to start its run on April 16, 2020, but was delayed by the COVID pandemic. The production finally premiered on October 21, 2021, with an expected run to November 27. The production was well-reviewed, and extended its run to December 9.

The German Premier Production opened at the Theater Regensburg in Regensburg. It premiered on May 24, 2025, with a closing date of March 13, 2026.

== Notable casts ==
Character	Broadway	San Diego	Washington DC	Off-West End	Kennedy Center	NYCC Encores!	West End	Los Angeles	Broadway Revival
Character	1981	1985	1990	2000	2002	2012	2013	2016	2023
Franklin Shepard	Jim Walton	John Rubinstein	Victor Garber	Julian Ovenden	Michael Hayden	Colin Donnell	Mark Umbers	Aaron Lazar	Jonathan Groff
Charley Kringas	Lonny Price	Chip Zien	David Garrison	Daniel Evans	Raúl Esparza	Lin-Manuel Miranda	Damian Humbley	Wayne Brady	Daniel Radcliffe
Mary Flynn	Ann Morrison	Heather MacRae	Becky Ann Baker	Samantha Spiro	Miriam Shor	Celia Keenan-Bolger	Jenna Russell	Donna Vivino	Lindsay Mendez
Gussie Carnegie	Terry Finn	Mary Gordon Murray	Mary Gordon Murray	Anna Francolini	Emily Skinner	Elizabeth Stanley	Josefina Gabrielle	Saycon Sengbloh	Krystal Joy Brown
Beth Spencer	Sally Klein	Marin Mazzie	Marin Mazzie	Mary Stockley	Anastasia Barzee	Betsy Wolfe	Clare Foster	Whitney Bashor	Katie Rose Clarke
Joe Josephson	Jason Alexander	Merwin Goldsmith	Richard Bauer	James Millard	Adam Heller	Adam Grupper	Glyn Kerslake	Amir Talai	Reg Rogers

== Cast recordings ==
The original Broadway cast recorded the show the day after their final performance. The recording was released by RCA as an LP album in April 1982, then compact disc in 1986. A 2007 remastered CD release from Sony/BMG Broadway Masterworks includes a bonus track of Sondheim performing "It's a Hit". In his review of the album, Alan Stern of The Boston Phoenix felt that "Merrily We Roll Along is not in the same league with Sweeney Todd. Although ingeniously structured, Merrily is less ambitious and less accomplished. Fans of Sondheimian mordancy and wordplay will be disappointed: lyrically, the songs are less showy than anything he’s written since 1964's Anyone Can Whistle".

A cast recording of the 2012 Encores! revival was released by PS Classics as a two-CD set, featuring Colin Donnell, Celia Keenan Bolger, Lin-Manuel Miranda, Betsy Wolfe, and Elizabeth Stanley.

Various artists have recorded the show's songs, including Carly Simon, Rosemary Clooney, Frank Sinatra, Petula Clark, Mandy Patinkin, Bernadette Peters, Betty Buckley, Cleo Laine, Liza Minnelli, Barbara Cook, Patti LuPone, Barry Manilow, Audra McDonald, Michael Crawford, and Lena Horne. "Not a Day Goes By", "Good Thing Going", "Old Friends", and "Our Time" frequently appear on the cabaret circuit.

The 2023 Broadway revival production released a digital cast recording on November 15, after announcing it just a few hours before at the end of the performance on November 14. The physical CD was released on January 12, 2024.

== Documentary ==
Original cast member Lonny Price directed the documentary Best Worst Thing That Ever Could Have Happened, describing the "thrilling, wrenching experience" of the original production. The film opened November 18, 2016, in New York City, followed by a question-and-answer session with Price, moderated by Bernadette Peters.

== Film adaptation ==
Richard Linklater announced in 2019 that he would film an adaptation of the musical over the course of twenty years, allowing the cast to age with their characters (a style Linklater used in Boyhood). Actors Ben Platt, Paul Mescal, and Beanie Feldstein portray Charley, Frank, and Mary.

== In popular culture ==
The 2017 film Lady Bird includes a school production of Merrily We Roll Along in its story; one of the students in the production was played by Feldstein.

== Awards and nominations ==
=== Original Broadway production ===
Year	Award	Category	Nominee	Result
1982	Tony Awards	Best Original Score	Stephen Sondheim	Nominated
1982	Drama Desk Awards	Outstanding Music	Stephen Sondheim	Nominated
1982	Drama Desk Awards	Outstanding Lyrics	Stephen Sondheim	Won
1982	Theatre World Award		Ann Morrison	Won

=== 1994 Off-Broadway production ===
Year	Award	Category	Nominee	Result
1995	Drama Desk Awards	Outstanding Musical		Nominated
1995	Drama Desk Awards	Outstanding Actor in a Musical	Malcolm Gets	Nominated

=== Original London production ===
Year	Award	Category	Nominee	Result
2001	Laurence Olivier Awards	Best New Musical		Won
2001	Laurence Olivier Awards	Best Actor in a Musical	Daniel Evans	Won
2001	Laurence Olivier Awards	Best Actress in a Musical	Samantha Spiro	Won
2001	Laurence Olivier Awards	Best Theatre Choreographer	Peter Darling	Nominated

=== 2012 London production ===
Year	Award	Category	Nominee	Result
2012	Critics' Circle Theatre Award	Best Musical		Won

=== 2013 West End production ===
Year	Award	Category	Nominee	Result
2013	Evening Standard Theatre Awards	Best Musical		Won
2014	Laurence Olivier Awards	Best Musical Revival		Won
2014	Laurence Olivier Awards	Best Actress in a Musical	Jenna Russell	Nominated
2014	Laurence Olivier Awards	Best Supporting Role in a Musical	Josefina Gabrielle	Nominated
2014	Laurence Olivier Awards	Best Director	Maria Friedman	Nominated
2014	Laurence Olivier Awards	Best Sound Design	Gareth Owen	Won (tie)
2014	Laurence Olivier Awards	Best Costume Design	Soutra Gilmour	Nominated
2014	Laurence Olivier Awards	Outstanding Achievement in Music	The Orchestra	Nominated

=== 2022 Off-Broadway revival ===
Year	Award	Category	Nominee	Result
2023	Drama Desk Awards	Outstanding Revival of a Musical		Nominated
2023	Drama Desk Awards	Outstanding Lead Performance in a Musical	Jonathan Groff	Nominated
2023	Drama Desk Awards	Outstanding Lead Performance in a Musical	Lindsay Mendez	Nominated
2023	Drama Desk Awards	Outstanding Featured Performance in a Musical	Daniel Radcliffe	Nominated
2023	Drama Desk Awards	Outstanding Director of a Musical	Maria Friedman	Nominated
2023	Lucille Lortel Awards	Outstanding Revival		Nominated
2023	Lucille Lortel Awards	Outstanding Lead Performer in a Musical	Lindsay Mendez	Nominated
2023	Lucille Lortel Awards	Outstanding Featured Performer in a Musical	Krystal Joy Brown	Nominated
2023	Lucille Lortel Awards	Outstanding Featured Performer in a Musical	Reg Rogers	Nominated
2023	Outer Critics Circle Awards	Outstanding Revival of a Musical		Nominated
2023	Outer Critics Circle Awards	Outstanding Lead Performer in an Off-Broadway Musical	Jonathan Groff	Won
2023	Outer Critics Circle Awards	Outstanding Featured Performer in an Off-Broadway Musical	Lindsay Mendez	Won
2023	Outer Critics Circle Awards	Outstanding Featured Performer in an Off-Broadway Musical	Daniel Radcliffe	Nominated
2023	Outer Critics Circle Awards	Outstanding Director of a Musical	Maria Friedman	Nominated
2023	Outer Critics Circle Awards	Outstanding Orchestrations	Jonathan Tunick	Nominated
2023	Off-Broadway Alliance Awards	Outstanding Revival of a Musical		Won

=== 2023 Broadway revival ===
Year	Award	Category	Nominee	Result
2024	Drama League Awards	Outstanding Revival of a Musical		Won
2024	Drama League Awards	Outstanding Direction of a Musical	Maria Friedman	Won
2024	Drama League Awards	Distinguished Performance	Jonathan Groff	Nominated
2024	Drama League Awards	Distinguished Performance	Lindsay Mendez	Nominated
2024	Drama League Awards	Distinguished Performance	Daniel Radcliffe	Nominated
2024	Tony Awards	Best Revival of a Musical		Won
2024	Tony Awards	Best Actor in a Musical	Jonathan Groff	Won
2024	Tony Awards	Best Featured Actor in a Musical	Daniel Radcliffe	Won
2024	Tony Awards	Best Featured Actress in a Musical	Lindsay Mendez	Nominated
2024	Tony Awards	Best Direction of a Musical	Maria Friedman	Nominated
2024	Tony Awards	Best Sound Design of a Musical	Kai Harada	Nominated
2024	Tony Awards	Best Orchestrations	Jonathan Tunick	Won
2024	New York Drama Critics' Circle Awards	Special Citation		Honored
2024	Dorian Award	Outstanding Broadway Musical Revival		Won
2024	Dorian Award	Outstanding Lead Performance in a Broadway Musical	Jonathan Groff	Won
2024	Dorian Award	Outstanding Featured Performance in a Broadway Musical	Lindsay Mendez	Nominated
2024	Dorian Award	Outstanding Featured Performance in a Broadway Musical	Daniel Radcliffe	Won
2024	Dorian Award	Outstanding Broadway Ensemble	Company	Nominated
2024	Dorian Award	Broadway Showstopper Award	"Franklin Shepard Inc."	Won
2025	Grammy Awards	Grammy Award for Best Musical Theater Album		Nominated
