= George Furth =

American librettist, playwright, and actor (1932–2008)

- Furth in The Debbie Reynolds Show, 1969
- Born: George Schweinfurth; December 14, 1932; Chicago, Illinois, U.S.
- Died: August 11, 2008 (aged 75); Santa Monica, California, U.S.
- Education: Northwestern University; Columbia University
- Occupations: Librettist; playwright; actor
- Years active: 1961–1998
- Notable work: Company; Merrily We Roll Along

George Furth (born George Schweinfurth; December 14, 1932 – August 11, 2008) was an American librettist, playwright, and actor.

== Life and career ==
Furth was born in Chicago, Illinois, the son of George and Evelyn (née Tuerk) Schweinfurth. He was of German and Irish ancestry, and was raised as a Christian Scientist. He received a Bachelor of Science in speech at Northwestern University in 1954 and received his master's degree from Columbia University.

A life member of the Actors Studio, Furth made his Broadway debut as an actor in the 1961 play A Cook for Mr. General, followed by the musical Hot Spot two years later. He was also known for his collaborations with Stephen Sondheim: the highly successful Company, the ill-fated Merrily We Roll Along, and the equally ill-fated drama Getting Away with Murder. Furth wrote the plays Twigs, The Supporting Cast, and Precious Sons as well as the book for the Kander and Ebb musical The Act.

One of Furth's latter writing projects was a foray into an area where he had not previously explored. He wrote the lyrics for a musical revue, with music by Doug Katsaros. Furth and Katsaros shaped the work with San Francisco director Mike Ward into The End-a new musical revue. The piece was performed at San Francisco's New Conservatory Theatre Center during the summer of 2004 and was billed as a "Pre-U.S. Tour Workshop Production". The piece was reworked twice, with the title changing to Last Call and Happy Hour, respectively.

== Television ==
He began working in television in 1962 under contract to Revue, Universal's TV division, and was frequently cast as an ineffectual milquetoast or a nervous functionary. While at Revue, Furth was signed by producer Edward Montagne for a featured role in an episode of McHale's Navy called "The Dart-Gun Wedding". This landed him a regular featured role in Montagne's McHale's Navy spinoff Broadside, as Lt. Beasley, the commander's ambitious adjutant. After that series ran its course, Universal renewed Furth's contract and reassigned him to a new series, Tammy. He was a fixture in situation comedies of the 1960s -- "being tagged as a young Paul Lynde" -- in such popular shows as I Dream of Jeannie, That Girl, Green Acres, The Monkees, Batman; The Odd Couple; Love, American Style; and F Troop. His other continuing sitcom role was in the short-lived 1976 series The Dumplings.

He also played character roles in Laredo (in which he played eight parts, as a quick-change artist), Bonanza, Adam-12, and Little House on the Prairie.

He adapted his play Twigs as a 1975 television production, starring Carol Burnett.

In the 1980 TV movie The Scarlett O'Hara War, concerning the casting for Gone with the Wind, he portrayed director George Cukor.

== Motion pictures ==
Universal signed George Furth for motion pictures in 1966. Furth appeared in many feature films, most memorably in The Boston Strangler, Butch Cassidy and the Sundance Kid (as a devoted railroad employee traveling in the car that contains the safe that Butch and his gang rob twice), Myra Breckinridge, Blazing Saddles (as one of the agitated townspeople), Shampoo (as a bank officer dealing with Warren Beatty's character's loan request), Oh, God! (as a newspaper editor who refuses to publicize John Denver's character's claims that God has communicated with him), The Cannonball Run (as Arthur J. Foyt, confused with auto-racing star A. J. Foyt), The Man with Two Brains, and Bulworth.

Furth continued working into the late 1990s, and was seen in Mary Hartman, Mary Hartman; Murphy Brown, L.A. Law, Dr. Quinn, Medicine Woman; and Murder, She Wrote, among other shows. In 1990 he worked as a voice actor in several episodes of the animated television series The Adventures of Don Coyote and Sancho Panda for Hanna-Barbera Productions.

== Personal life and death ==
Furth was gay, although he was once romantically involved with actress Inger Stevens, according to a 1962 item by gossip columnist Louella Parsons. Three years later Stevens still regarded him as her favorite actor. The Hollywood Reporter also linked Furth with actress Lana Wood, and two months later the same columnist announced that Furth was Sally Kellerman's "steady beau". Furth was guarded about sharing details of his private life: "I just don't do interviews. That's why I have so many friends."

He and Stephen Sondheim both repeatedly refused to update Company to give it a gay slant.

Furth died at a hospital in Santa Monica, California, on August 11, 2008, at age 75.

== Awards ==
Furth won both the Tony and Drama Desk Award for Outstanding Book of a Musical for Company and was nominated for a Drama Desk Award for Outstanding New Play for Precious Sons.

== Filmography ==
- The Best Man (1964) as Tom
- The New Interns (1964) as Dr. Phil Osterman
- A Very Special Favor (1965) as Pete
- A Rage to Live (1965) as Paul Rutherford
- The Cool Ones (1967) as Howie
- Tammy and the Millionaire (1967) as Dwayne Whitt
- Games (1967) as Terry, Party Guest
- Nobody's Perfect (1968) as Hamner
- How to Save a Marriage and Ruin Your Life (1968) as Roger
- P.J. (1968) as Sonny Silene
- What's So Bad About Feeling Good? (1968) as Murgatroyd
- The Boston Strangler (1968) as Lyonel Brumley
- Butch Cassidy and the Sundance Kid (1969) as Woodcock
- Myra Breckinridge (1970) as Charlie Flager Jr.
- The Third Girl from the Left (1973) as Zimmy
- Sleeper (1973) as Guest at Luna's Party (uncredited)
- Blazing Saddles (1974) as Van Johnson
- Shampoo (1975) as Mr. Pettis
- Norman... Is That You? (1976) as Mr. Sukara
- Prime Time a.k.a. American Raspberry (1977) as President
- Airport '77 (1977) as Gerald Lucas
- Oh God! (1977) as Briggs
- Hooper (1978) as Bidwell
- The Cannonball Run (1981) as Arthur J. Foyt
- Megaforce (1982) as Professor Eggstrum
- Young Doctors in Love (1982) as The Patients - Disgusting Looking Patient
- Doctor Detroit (1983) as Arthur Skridlow
- The Man with Two Brains (1983) as Timon
- Murder, She Wrote (1986) as Farley Pressman
- Foofur (1986) as Additional voices
- The Adventures of Don Coyote and Sancho Panda (1990) as Additional voices
- The Munsters Today (1990) as Dr. Carver (in "Just Another Face")
- Dr. Quinn, Medicine Woman (1993) as Jedidiah Bancroft
- Goodbye Lover (1998) as Mr. Merritt
- Bulworth (1998) as Older Man

== Television ==
Year	Title	Role	Notes
1963	The Alfred Hitchcock Hour	Charlie	Season 2 Episode 6: "Nothing Ever Happens in Linvale"
1964	The Alfred Hitchcock Hour	Jack Terola	Season 2 Episode 21: "Beast in View"
1964	McHale's Navy	Roger Whitfield III	Season 2 Episode 35, "The Dart Gun Wedding"
1966	The Monkees	Ronnie Farnsworth	Season 1 Episode 13, "One Man Shy"
1967	The Monkees	Henry	Season 2 Episode 11, "A Coffin Too Frequent"
1969	I Dream Of Jeannie	Charlie Farnum, reporter	Season 4 Episode 26, "Blackmail Order Bride"
1971	All in the Family	Whitney Fitzroy IV, lawyer	Season 1 Episode 3, "Oh, My Aching Back"
