= Jim Walton (actor) =

American actor

- Born: Tachikawa, Japan
- Education: University of Cincinnati – College-Conservatory of Music
- Occupation: Actor

Jim Walton is an American actor, most notable for his leading performance in the original production of Stephen Sondheim's Merrily We Roll Along as Franklin Shephard.

== Early life ==
Walton was born in Tachikawa, Japan, and grew up in Marion, Indiana.

== Career ==
He graduated with a musical theatre degree from the College-Conservatory of Music at the University of Cincinnati and moved to New York City in 1979, the year in which he was in Big Bad Burlesque and "Scrambled Feet". In November 1980, he made his Broadway debut in Perfectly Frank, a revue of Frank Loesser's songs.

In December 1980, at auditions for Merrily, director Harold Prince asked him how old he was. At that time, he was 25, and he decided to tell the truth about his age. He was sure he would be cut because they were looking for people closer to 18. He was relieved when they announced to the room that this was the cast of Merrily, but would have to wait nine months because Sondheim had not finished the score at this time. Jim Weissenbach was originally cast as Franklin Shepard, but was let go during previews and Walton was chosen as his replacement. Merrily only lasted for 16 performances.

In the fall of 1982, he went on tour with 42nd Street, in which he later appeared on Broadway.

He was next in the 1987 musical revue Stardust, a musical of Mitchell Parish's songs. He next starred as Anthony Hope in the 1989 revival of Sweeney Todd: The Demon Barber of Fleet Street, with Bob Gunton as the title character. In 1990, he was in the musical revue Closer Than Ever.

He was in the 1991 original Off-Broadway cast of And the World Goes 'Round.

He starred in the 1998 American premiere of The Fix at the Signature Theatre as Reed Chandler. He was also in the 2000 revival of The Music Man.

In 2003, he starred as Eliot Rosewater in a concert production of Howard Ashman's and Alan Menken's musical Kurt Vonnegut's God Bless You, Mr. Rosewater alongside Carolee Carmello and David Pittu.

He was in the 2004 Off-Broadway musical Chef's Theater: A Musical Feast. At North Shore Music Theatre in 2008, he played Frank in Show Boat.

He returned to Broadway in 2009 as Harry the Horse and an understudy for Nicely-Nicely Johnson in Guys and Dolls and as Charles F. Maude in Bye Bye Birdie, as well as the 2011 production of Company.

He was also in the 2011 limited engagement of the new musical by Maury Yeston, Death Takes a Holiday.

He has been in three PBS performances. He performed in the 1985 Philharmonic concert of Sondheim's Follies as Young Buddy, with Mandy Patinkin portraying the older Buddy. The two-day concert was recorded and released on CD. He was also in Crazy for You and The All Night Strut.

He played the role of Manfred in the 2017 Broadway revival of Sunset Boulevard, with Glenn Close starring as Norma Desmond.

He joined the Broadway company of Come from Away on November 13, 2018, in the role of Nick/Doug and others, and stayed with the production until it closed in 2022, including performing in the 2021 film alongside his niece, Emily Walton.

== Works ==
Walton and his brother Bob wrote My Brother's Keeper, Double Trouble, and Midlife! The Crisis Musical, the latter of which premiered at the Chanhassen Dinner Theaters and is licensed through R&H Theatricals.

== Personal life ==
He is brother to actor Bob Walton and brother-in-law to actress Laurie Walton. He is the father of Tyler (Walton) Zeller.
