= Ladyship (musical) =

2019 stage musical by Laura and Linda Good

Ladyship the Musical
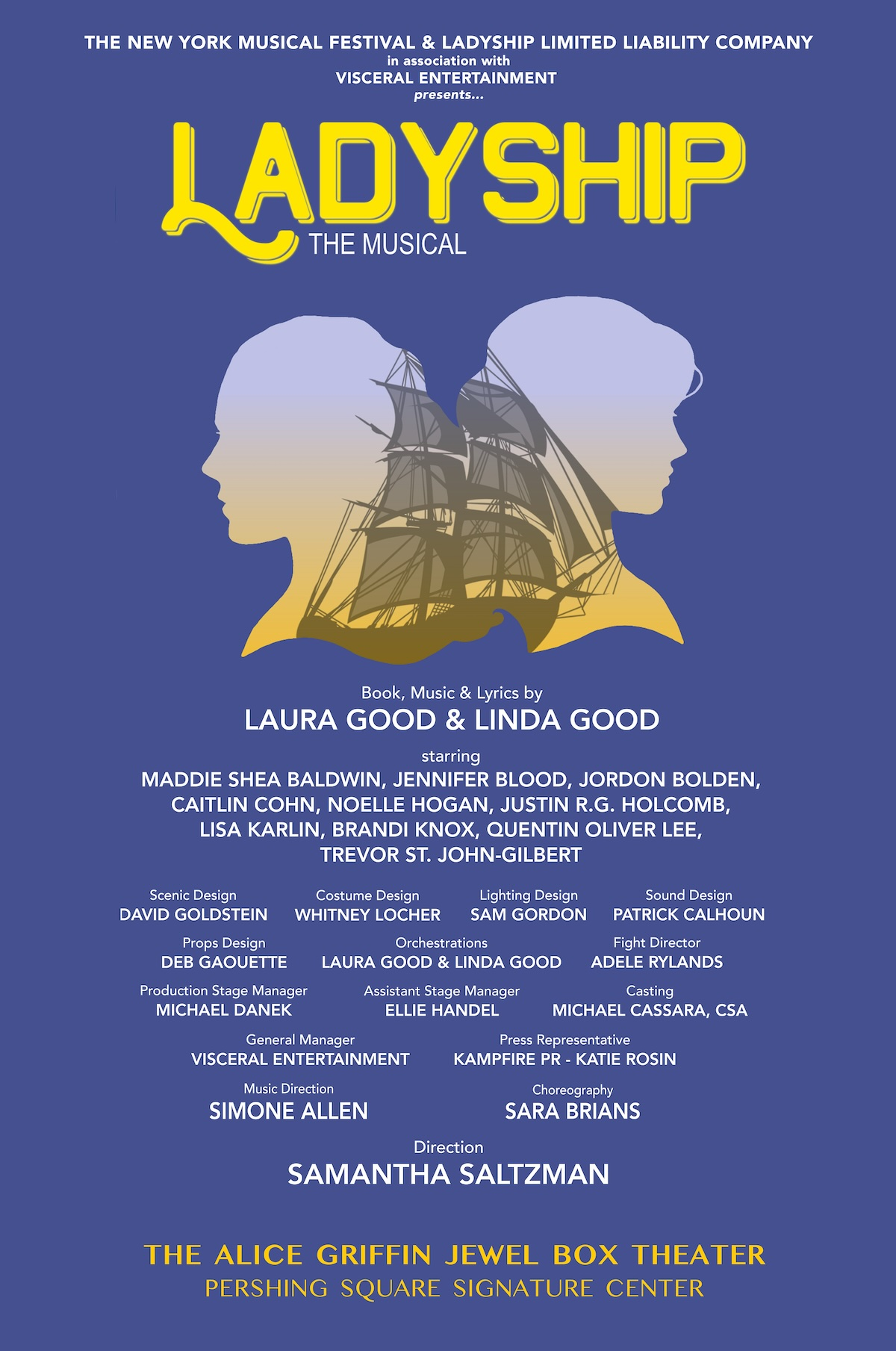
- Poster of the original New York production
- Music: Laura Good and Linda Good
- Lyrics: Laura Good and Linda Good
- Book: Laura Good and Linda Good
- Premiere: July 10, 2019: Alice Griffin Jewel Box Theatre, New York City

Ladyship is a stage musical with music, lyrics and book by Laura Good and Linda Good of the alt-pop band, The Twigs, based upon the conviction and transportation of women convicts from England to Australia in 1789.

It premiered off-broadway at The Alice Griffin Jewel Box Theater on July 10, 2019, as part of The New York Musical Festival, as a main stage production, and was directed by Samantha Saltzman.

== Historical basis ==
Ladyship is based upon true events during the time when approximately 25,000 convict women were sent from England to Australia from 1788 to 1868 under the British government's Transportation Act. The boat journey from England to Australia was treacherous and often took between ten months to year or longer. On board, women convicts were often subjected to poor conditions, violence, meager food, sickness, disease, and some gave birth during the journey. However, if they survived the boat journey and completed their sentences of seven years or more, women could potentially keep any money they earned, own land, and start their own businesses, which they were not legally allowed to do in Britain at the time.

== Synopsis ==
=== Act I ===
In 1789 London, England, Irish teenage sisters Alice and Mary Reed have been accused of committing a petty crime and are standing trial for stealing a handkerchief. Facing a corrupt justice system, they find they have no say in who determines their fate (“Who Decides”). The sisters are thrown into an over-crowded jail full of poor, starving young women, and are unfairly sentenced to seven years transportation to Australia (“Seven Years”). They meet Abigail Gainsborough, a card sharper, and Mrs. Pickering, a mother in debt, and soon learn they are all victims of a government plan that tries to rid the streets of the poor by doling out punishments that severely outweigh the crimes (“The Bloody Code”). Alice and Mary see a girl hiding in the corner, Kitty MacDougal, an orphan falsely accused of theft, and they survive the night by hanging to a glimmer of hope (“A Way Out”).

After the female convicts are loaded onto a ship bound for Australia, they are herded into a dark jail cell on the Orlop Deck – the foul bottom of the ship. Captain Josiah Adams, aided by his privileged nephew Lt. Brandon Adams and Deck Officer Zeke Cropper, has to make sure the women arrive alive, so they can be workers and wives to the male convicts already there. A mixed-race seaman, Marcus "Finn" Findley, catches the eye of Mary. Abigail spars with Lady Jane Sharp, a disgraced high-society woman, who joins the others in wondering how they will endure the arduous ten-month journey. Kitty imagines a better future (“So Many Stars”). Harassed by the ship's seamen, the women become increasingly emaciated (“Pour Another Rum”). Good-hearted Finn tries to help the women and begins to fall in love with Mary (“Ready to Begin”).

As weeks pass and hope fades, Abigail suggests there is a way to get protection, warmth and better food by becoming “temporary wives” to the seamen, an old seafaring custom (“Only the Strong Survive”). After Sunday service on deck, the Captain orders the women to dance for exercise ("The Emerald Wye”). As night falls, some of the women consider Abigail's suggestion, while Mary waits for Finn. A drunken Lieutenant attacks Mary, and Alice and Finn contemplate revenge (“Never Burns Away”). The women comfort Mary as time passes ("Sparrow, Sparrow"). As the ship reaches its first port, Rio, Abigail suggests the women make money using every skill they have, even if it's prostitution. Lady Jane and Kitty hope to use their sewing skills instead, while Alice ponders what to do (“Everything Has a Price”). As Finn prepares to run away with Mary, she tells him she is pregnant.

=== Act II ===
After a month docked in Rio ("Até Logo"), Lady Jane confronts the Captain about what the future will be for the women convicts and their unborn children (“I Need An Anchor”). Alice overhears the hard truth that Mary's baby will be taken away upon arrival to the new colony and informs Mary (“No Matter Where We’re Bound”). Undaunted, Alice encourages the women to fight back against their oppressors (“I’m Done”). As a storm approaches, an angry Lieutenant throws Mary down on the deck. The ship rocks, lightning flashes, and Finn and the Lieutenant fall overboard. Alice must choose who she helps.

Alice comforts a shaken Mary (“I’ll Be Your Anchor”), but the fall causes her to go into labor. The women encircle Mary, encouraging her to summon her inner strength (“Dig Deep”). Mary almost dies in childbirth, but survives with support of the women on board. Alice vows to do whatever it takes to protect those she loves (“I’ll Find a Way”). As the ship approaches Sydney Cove, the women join and steel themselves for what lies ahead (“Finale”).

== Cast and characters ==
Character	Off-Broadway
Character	2019
Alice Reed	Maddie Shea Baldwin
Mary Reed	Caitlin Cohn
Abigail Gainsborough	Lisa Karlin
Lady Jane Sharp	Jennifer Blood
Mrs. Pickering	Brandi Knox
Kitty MacDougal	Noelle Hogan
Captain Josiah Adams	Quentin Oliver Lee
Marcus "Finn" Findley	Jordan Bolden
Lieutenant Brandon Adams	Trevor St. John-Gilbert
Zeke Cropper	Justin R.G. Holcomb

== Songs ==
=== Off-Broadway (2019) ===
Act I

- “The System”
- “The Bloody Code”
- “A Way Out”
- “Seven Years”
- “So Many Stars”
- “Seven Years (Reprise)”
- “Pour Another Rum for the Sailor”
- “All We Have Left”
- “Only The Strong Survive”
- “Hymn”
- “The Emerald Wye”
- “The Bonnie Sea”
- “Ready To Begin”
- “Everything Has a Price”

Act II

- “I Need an Anchor”
- “No Matter Where We’re Bound”
- “I’m Done”
- “Women Are Wicked"
- “I’ll Be Your Anchor (Reprise)”
- “Dig Deep”
- “I’ll Find a Way”
- “Finale: I’ll Find a Way (Reprise)”

== Production history ==
The debut production of Ladyship was directed by Samantha Saltzman and featured Maddie Shea Baldwin (Bright Star) as Alice Reed, Caitlin Cohn (Lolita, My Love) as Mary Reed, Jennifer Blood (Matilda the Musical) as Lady Jane Sharp, Jordon Bolden (TV: Daredevil, Law & Order: SVU) as Marcus "Finn" Findley, Noelle Hogan (Fun Home, US Tour) as Kitty MacDougal, Justin R.G. Holcomb (Honor Bound) as Zeke Cropper, Lisa Karlin (Ragtime, Revival) as Abigail Gainsborough, Brandi Knox (Hairspray, Regional) as Mrs. Pickering, Quentin Oliver Lee (The Phantom of the Opera, US Tour) as Captain Josiah Adams, and Trevor St. John-Gilbert (Les Misérables, Regional) as Lieutenant Brandon Adams. The production featured scenic design by David Goldstein, costume design by Whitney Locher, and lighting design by Sam Gordon. Patrick Calhoun as sound designer, Deb Gaouette was props designer, Adele Rylands was the fight director, Sara Brians was choreographer, and Michael Danek was the production stage manager. Michael Cassara Casting was the casting director, Visceral Entertainment was the production manager, Connor Delves did social media and Kampfire PR was publicist. Simone Allen was music director.

Ladyship, A Young Performers Concert Medley, Songs from the new musical by Laura and Linda Good, was performed by Main Stage Young Performers Company at the Arkley Center for the Performing Arts in 2021. Songs performed included, “Seven Years”, “So Many Stars”, and “I’ll Find a Way”.

Ladyship (High School Edition) premiered January 13, 2023 at Clear Brook High School by the Clear Brook Players, in Friendswood, TX. It was directed by Asa Smith and Michelle Smith, with a cast of over 45 high-school actors and theater crew. Music direction was by Stephanie Cramer, and choreography was by Hayden West. For the performance run, The CB Players partnered with Hands of Justice, a survivor-led anti-trafficking nonprofit organization that helps survivors of sex-trafficking reclaim their lives.

Ladyship in Concert, featuring selected songs and scenes from the musical, was performed as part of Main Stage Humboldt Theater's New Works series, at The Arkley Center for Performing Arts, Eureka, CA, August 3-4, 2024.

== Awards and nominations ==
- Ladyship was a finalist for the 2020 Richard Rogers Award for Musical Theatre.
- Ladyship was nominated for several awards for its New York Musical Festival (NYMF) run in 2019, including Outstanding Lead Performer (Maddie Shea Baldwin), Outstanding Supporting Performer (Jennifer Blood), and Outstanding Overall Design (scenic design by David Goldstein, costume design by Whitney Locher, lighting design by Sam Gordon, sound Design by Patrick Calhoun and Props design by Deb Gaouette).

== Ladyship the Musical (Original Concept Recording) (2024) ==
Laura Good and Linda Good produced a concept album version of the musical, entitled Ladyship the Musical (Original Concept Recording), featuring many of the actors who were in the original version of the stage show in New York. It was released on Whirligig Records on July 12, 2024.

=== Album credits ===
- Produced by Laura Good and Linda Good
- Music and Lyrics by Laura Good and Linda Good
- Arrangements for Instruments and Vocals by Laura Good and Linda Good
- Orchestrations by Laura Good and Linda Good
- Engineered by Jakob Reinhardt, Marc Doten, Laura Good, Linda Good
- Mixed by Jakob Reinhardt
- Mastered by Jett Galindo at The Bakery
- Maddie Shea Baldwin – Vocals (Alice Reed)
- Savannah Frazier – Vocals (Mary Reed)
- Lisa Karlin – Vocals (Abigail Gainsborough)
- Annie Sherman – Vocals (Lady Jane Sharp)
- Brandi Knox – Vocals (Mrs. Pickering)
- Alena Touve – Vocals (Kitty MacDougal)
- Quentin Oliver Lee – Vocals (Captain Adams)
- Trevor St. John-Gilbert – Vocals (Lieutenant Adams)
- Jordan Rogers – Vocals (Marcus “Finn” Findley)
- Lourdes McDonald – Vocals
- Linda Good: Piano, Keyboards, Accordion, Electric Guitar, Bass, Vocals, Percussion
- Laura Good: Acoustic and Electric Guitar, Keyboards, Vocals, Cello, Percussion, Bodhran
- Marc Doten: Bass
- Joe Berardi: Drums
- Paul Cartwright: Violin, Viola
- Ro Rowan: Cello
- Jakob Reinhardt: Electric Guitar
- Renee Albert: Accordion, Vocals

=== Track listing ===
Act I

- 1. Who Decides (2:16)
- 2. Seven Years (2:21)
- 3. The Bloody Code (2:10)
- 4. A Way Out (3:01)
- 5. So Many Stars (2:58)
- 6. Pour Another Rum (1:05)
- 7. Ready to Begin (3:13)
- 8. Only the Strong Survive (3:15)
- 9. Blessed Mary Full of Grace (:41)
- 10. The Emerald Wye (1:51)
- 11. The Bonnie Sea (:35)
- 12. Never Burns Away (Recitative) (1:05)
- 13. Never Burns Away (2:36)
- 14. Sparrow, Sparrow (2:08)
- 15. Everything Has a Price (3:49)

Act II

- 16. Até Logo (1:41)
- 17. I Need an Anchor (3:10)
- 18. No Matter Where We’re Bound (2:34)
- 19. I'm Done (2:41)
- 20. I'll Be Your Anchor (1:53)
- 21. Dig Deep (1:10)
- 22. I'll Find a Way (3:31)
- 23. Finale (3:50)

[23 Songs, 54 Minutes]
