= The Twigs =

American musical duo

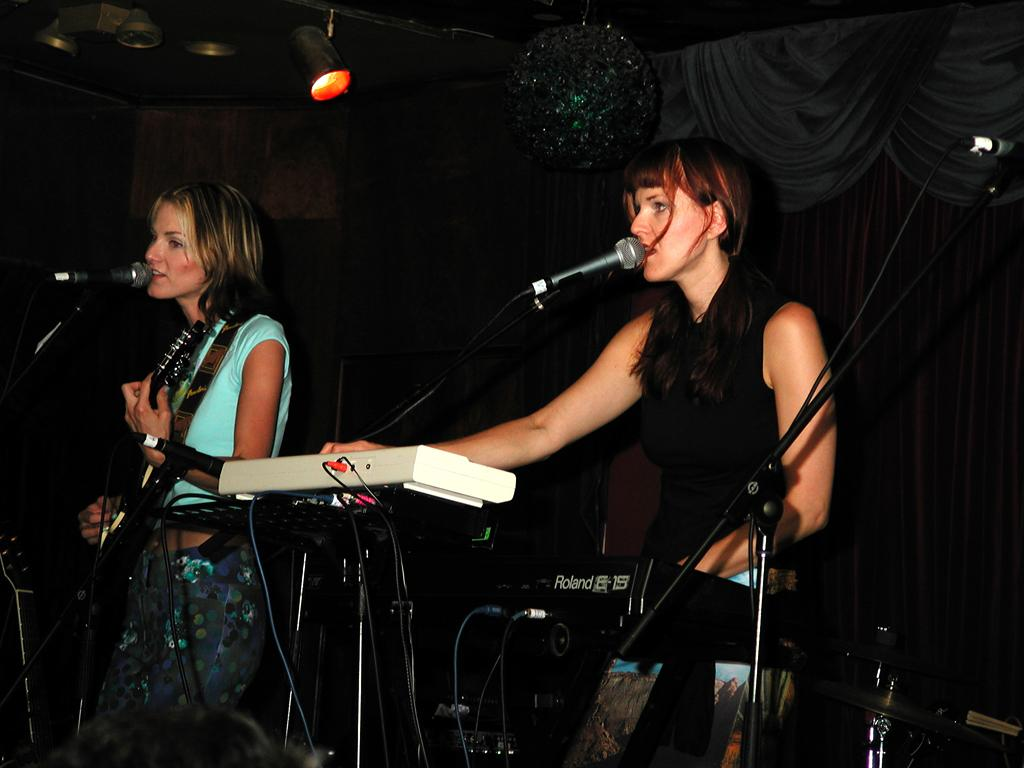
- Laura Good (left) and Linda Good live at The Mint, Los Angeles

Background information
- Genre: Alternative pop
- Instruments: Keyboards, piano, voice, guitar, bass
- Years active: 1994–present
- Label: Whirl-i-gig Records
- Website: twigs.com ladyship.twigs.com

The Twigs are the American twin sisters and musician/singer/songwriters Laura Good and Linda Good. Raised in Chicago, by way of Ohio and Mexico City, the twins are self-taught musicians who learned piano, guitar and songwriting by studying Beatles songs. Using their childhood nickname "Twigs" as their band name, the duo has released four albums. Their songs have appeared in film and television shows including "Love, Love, Love (Remix)" in Cruel Intentions 3 (Sony Pictures) and "Oh Mary" in Men in Trees (ABC). After being a well-known part of the alternative pop scene in Chicago, they moved to California in 2000, which launched their careers as songwriters and producers, and where the LA Weekly described them as, "...Silky voiced sirens with universal appeal." Linda toured separately as a keyboardist/backup singer with such notable acts as Jane's Addiction, The Mars Volta, Lisa Marie Presley, and Bitter:Sweet, while still co-writing with Laura on Twigs projects. They released a CD of rock/pop songs especially for children, Jump Right In in 2013. In 2017, Laura Good was featured in a short film with musicians Daniel Carlson and Bark Benton produced by the Bouffant Collective. Their most recent project was writing the original musical, Ladyship, which debuted at the New York Musical Theater Festival (NYMF) in New York City in 2019. The Twigs are currently based out of Los Angeles and Virginia.

== The Twigs Musical "LADYSHIP" ==
Linda Good and Laura Good wrote the music, book and lyrics for a new original historical musical entitled Ladyship. Ladyship was inspired by true events during the time when approximately 25,000 convict women were sent from England to Australia from 1788 and 1868 under the British government's Transportation Act — a supposedly more humane alternative to the death penalty. The musical follows the characters of two Irish teenage sisters, Alice and Mary, along with some of their fellow convicts, and how they narrowly survive the perilous journey. Ladyship was an Official Grand Jury Selection of the New York Musical Festival (NYMF) 2019, and made its debut in New York City at the Alice Griffin Jewel Box Theater on July 10, 2019.

The debut production of Ladyship was directed by Samantha Saltzman and featured Maddie Shea Baldwin (Bright Star) as Alice Reed, Caitlin Cohn (Lolita, My Love) as Mary Reed, Jennifer Blood (Matilda the Musical) as Lady Jane Sharp, Jordon Bolden (TV: Daredevil, Law & Order: SVU) as Marcus "Finn" Findley, Noelle Hogan (Fun Home, US Tour) as Kitty MacDougal, Justin R.G. Holcomb (Honor Bound) as Zeke Cropper, Lisa Karlin (Ragtime, Revival) as Abigail Gainsborough, Brandi Knox (Hairspray, Regional) as Mrs. Pickering, Quentin Oliver Lee (The Phantom of the Opera, US Tour) as Captain Josiah Adams, and Trevor St. John-Gilbert (Les Miserables, Regional) as Lieutenant Brandon Adams. The production featured scenic design by David Goldstein, costume design by Whitney Locher, and lighting design by Sam Gordon. Patrick Calhoun as sound designer, Deb Gaouette was props designer, Adele Rylands was the fight director, Sara Brians was choreographer, and Michael Danek was the production stage manager. Michael Cassara Casting was the casting director, Visceral Entertainment was the production manager, Connor Delves did social media and Kampfire PR was publicist. Simone Allen was music director.

Ladyship (High School Edition) premiered January 13, 2023 at Clear Brook High School by the Clear Brook Players, in Friendswood, TX. It was directed by Asa Smith and Michelle Smith, with a cast and crew of over 45 high-school actors and theater crew. Music direction was by Stephanie Cramer, and choreography was by Hayden West. For the performance run, The CB Players partnered with Hands of Justice, a survivor-led anti-trafficking nonprofit organization that helps survivors of sex-trafficking reclaim their lives.

Linda Good and Laura Good of The Twigs produced a concept album version of the musical, entitled Ladyship the Musical (Original Concept Recording), featuring many of the actors who were in the original version of the stage show in New York (release date July 2024).

== Discography ==
- Bring Me the Head of Eternity (1996) Whirl-i-gig Records
- The Universe Tonight (2001) Whirl-i-gig Records Produced by Grammy-nominated Producer Johnny K.
- You Say Ah (2005) Whirl-i-gig Records
- Jump Right In (2013) Whirl-i-gig Records
- Flying Kites on Christmas (Released December 7, 2018) Christmas single. Whirl-i-Gig Records.
- Ladyship the Musical (Original Concept Recording) (Released July 12, 2024) Whirl-i-gig Records. Written and Produced by Laura Good and Linda Good of The Twigs.
- Geminae (Released October 8, 2024) Whirligig Records

== Media ==
- Hoekstra, Dave (April 4, 1996). "Twigs' bold debut sets them apart". Chicago Sun-Times.
- Loncaric, Terry (February 27, 1997). "These Twigs don't bend". The Star – Orland Park.
- "Slender Grooves". (Oct. 14 – 27, 2002). Music Connection, p. 26.
- Interview with Linda Good by Ted Allen (July 2002). "Gotta Be Good". Chicago Magazine p. 20.
- Blaser, Linda (September 27, 2013). "Sisters branch out..." LakeForester/Sun-times.
- Broadway World News (May 13, 2019). "LADYSHIP, A NEW MUSICAL On The Founding Mothers Of Australia Announced At NYMF"Broadway World
- Calhoon, Zack (June 8, 2019). "People You Should Know – Linda Good"Visible Soul
- Calhoon, Zack (June 8, 2019). "People You Should Know – Laura Good"Visible Soul
- Sathe, Jane Dunlap (June 15, 2019). "'LadyShip' alt-pop musical follows the harrowing journey of 'mothers of Australia'" The Daily Progress
- Skethway, Nathan (June 27, 2019). "Look Inside the 2019 New York Musical Festival's Preview" Playbill
- Hodge, Sandy (October 6, 2019). "Local Writer Sails on to Broadway with New Musical" The Crozet Gazette
- Canvas Rebel (February 12, 2024) Interview with Linda Good of The Twigs Meet Linda Good
