= A Strange Loop =

2019 stage musical by Michael R. Jackson

- 2022 Broadway poster
- Music: Michael R. Jackson
- Lyrics: Michael R. Jackson
- Book: Michael R. Jackson
- Premiere: May 3, 2019: Playwrights Horizons, New York City
- Productions: 2019 Off-Broadway; 2021 Washington, DC; 2022 Broadway; 2023 Barbican Centre, London; 2024 Boston; 2024 Los Angeles; 2025 Toronto
- Awards: Obie Award for Playwrighting; Pulitzer Prize for Drama; Drama Desk Award for Outstanding Musical; Tony Award for Best Musical; Tony Award for Best Book of a Musical

A Strange Loop is a musical with book, music, and lyrics by Michael R. Jackson, which won the 2020 Pulitzer Prize for Drama. First produced off-Broadway in 2019, then staged in Washington, D.C. in 2021, A Strange Loop premiered on Broadway at the Lyceum Theatre in April 2022. The show won Best Musical and Best Book of a Musical at the 75th Tony Awards.

== Plot summary ==
While working as a Broadway theatre usher at The Lion King, aspiring musical theater writer Usher contemplates the show he is writing, wanting it to represent what it is like to "travel the world in a fat, black, queer body" ("Intermission Song"). He plans to change himself, but his thoughts are too disruptive ("Today"). His mother, who constantly reminds him how hard she and his father worked to raise him, calls with a request that he write a Tyler Perry-style gospel play ("We Wanna Know").

Usher wishes he could act more like his "inner white girl" but is held back by expectations put on Black boys ("Inner White Girl"). His Thoughts criticize the show, claiming the main character should have more sex appeal and telling him to add certain elements. Usher's father leaves a voicemail saying he found Scott Rudin's number and urges him to leverage their common sexuality to make a connection ("Didn't Want Nothin'").

At a medical checkup, Usher's doctor inquires about his sex life and prescribes Truvada. Usher starts using dating apps but is rejected, causing him to rage against the gay community ("Exile In Gayville"). A stranger flirts with Usher before revealing he is a figment of Usher's imagination and dismissing the war between the "second-wave feminist" and "the dick-sucking Black gay man" within him ("Second Wave").

Usher's agent tells him Tyler Perry is seeking a ghostwriter for a gospel play, but Usher has a low opinion of Perry's work. Appearing as famous Black figures, his Thoughts accuse him of being a race traitor and persuade him to take the job ("Tyler Perry Writes Real Life"). Usher writes the play, acting out all the characters as caricatures ("Writing a Gospel Play").

At work, Usher tells a patron he cannot continue the show without confronting his parents with his artistic self. The patron advises him to live without fear ("A Sympathetic Ear"). Usher speaks with his parents over the phone, his father asking if he has contracted HIV and his mother asking about the status of the gospel play. After hooking up with "Inwood Daddy", a white man who fetishizes him and calls him racial slurs, Usher questions his "Boundaries".

On his birthday, Usher's mother leaves a voicemail reminding him that homosexuality is a sin ("Periodically") while his father calls to inform him their church does not approve of his music ("Didn't Want Nothin' [Reprise]"). During Usher's arguing with his parents, his mother, horrified by her portrayal in the play, accuses him of hating and disappointing her. Usher recalls how his friend Darnell, thinking he deserved to die, refused HIV medication and concludes living with AIDS is worse than dying from it ("Precious Little Dream/AIDS Is God's Punishment"). His mother tells Usher he is loved but thinks he is struggling because of his homosexuality.

The Thought who is portraying Usher's mother breaks the fourth wall, asking Usher if he wants the show to end with hateful caricatures of his parents. Usher claims that he is depicting life as it was when he was 17, to which the Thoughts remind him he is now 26. Usher then reflects on his childhood, realizing his perceptions must change before he can change ("Memory Song"). With his back to the audience, Usher wonders what will happen when the show ends. He turns around, concluding that he does not need to change because change is an illusion, and he, like everyone else, is in "A Strange Loop".

== Cast and characters ==
Character	MTF Workshop	Off-Broadway	Washington, D.C.	Broadway	London	West Coast Premiere	Regional Premiere (Boston)
Character	2015	2019	2021	2022	2023	2024	2024
Usher	Larry Owens	Larry Owens	Jaquel Spivey	Jaquel Spivey	Kyle Ramar Freeman	Malachi McCaskill	Kai Clifton
Thought 1	L Morgan Lee	L Morgan Lee	L Morgan Lee	L Morgan Lee	Sharlene Hector	Tarra Connor Jones	Grant Evan
Thought 2	James Jackson, Jr.	James Jackson, Jr.	James Jackson, Jr.	James Jackson, Jr.	Nathan Armarkwei-Laryea	J. Cameron Barnett	Darvon S. Monroe
Thought 3	Elijah Caldwell	John-Michael Lyles	John-Michael Lyles	John-Michael Lyles	Yeukayi Ushe	Avionce Hoyles	Jonathan Melo
Thought 4	John-Andrew Morrison	John-Andrew Morrison	John-Andrew Morrison	John-Andrew Morrison	Tendai Humphrey Sitima	John-Andrew Morrison	Aaron Michael Ray
Thought 5	Jason Veasey	Jason Veasey	Jason Veasey	Jason Veasey	Danny Bailey	Jordan Barbour	De'Lon Grant
Thought 6	Jamaal Clark Turpin	Antwayn Hopper	Antwayn Hopper	Antwayn Hopper	Eddie Elliot	Carlis Shane Clark	Zion Middleton

== Musical numbers ==
- "Intermission Song" – Usher, Thoughts
- "Today" – Usher, Thoughts
- "We Wanna Know" – Thoughts
- "Inner White Girl" – Usher, Thoughts
- "Didn't Want Nothin'" – Thought 5, Thoughts
- "Exile in Gayville" – Usher, Thoughts
- "Second Wave" – Usher
- "Tyler Perry Writes Real Life" – Usher, Thought 3, Thoughts
- "Writing a Gospel Play" – Usher, Thoughts
- "A Sympathetic Ear" – Thought 1
- "Inwood Daddy" – Usher, Thought 6, Thoughts
- "Boundaries" – Usher
- "Periodically" – Thought 4, Usher
- "Didn't Want Nothin' Reprise" – Thought 5
- "Precious Little Dream / AIDS Is God's Punishment" – Usher, Thoughts
- "Memory Song" – Usher, Thoughts 2-6
- "A Strange Loop" – Usher, Thoughts

== Productions ==
=== Off-Broadway (2019) ===
A Strange Loop began previews at off-Broadway venue Playwrights Horizons on May 24, 2019. It opened on June 17, 2019, with closing scheduled for July 7, 2019, before extending to July 28, 2019. The show featured Larry Owens as Usher. The creative team credits included Michael R. Jackson as writer of book, music, and lyrics, Stephen Brackett as director, Raja Feather Kelly as choreographer, Charlie Rosen as orchestrator, and Rona Siddiqui as music director.

=== Washington, D.C. (2021) ===
The Washington, DC production at Woolly Mammoth Theatre Company was originally scheduled for September 2020, but postponed to December 2021 due to the COVID-19 pandemic. The six-week limited run began previews November 22, 2021, and opened December 3, 2021. The show extended another week, changing its closing date from January 2 to 9, 2022.

=== Broadway (2022–2023) ===
The Broadway production of A Strange Loop was announced December 20, 2021. Many notable people from the entertainment industry served as the show's producers. They included lead producer Barbara Whitman, as well as Benj Pasek, Justin Paul, Jennifer Hudson, RuPaul Charles, Marc Platt, Megan Ellison of Annapurna Pictures, Don Cheadle, Frank Marshall, James L. Nederlander, Alan Cumming, Ilana Glazer, Mindy Kaling and Billy Porter. Previews were scheduled to begin on April 6, but were postponed to April 14 due to COVID-19 breakouts among the cast. The show officially opened April 26, 2022. In October 2022, it was announced that the show would play its final performance on Broadway on January 15, 2023.

=== London (2023) ===
The London production opened at the Barbican Centre on June 17, 2023, for a limited run until September 9. It was produced by Howard Panter for Trafalgar Theatre Productions, the National Theatre, Barbara Whitman and Wessex Grove. Brackett, Kelly, Rosen, Siddiqui, and the rest of the Broadway creative team returned for the London production. Kyle Ramar Freeman, who understudied Usher on Broadway, starred in the production alongside an all-British cast of Thoughts. Freeman played his final performance on August 12 due to prior commitments. Kyle Birch stepped into the role of Usher on August 14 and continued through the show's final performance.

=== Other productions ===
A Strange Loop played as a co-production between American Conservatory Theater (A.C.T.) in San Francisco and the Center Theatre Group in Los Angeles, presented at A.C.T. from April 18 to May 12, 2024, and the Center Theatre Group's Ahmanson Theatre from June 5 to June 30, 2024. The production was helmed by the same creative team as the Broadway and London mountings and featured a largely new cast as Usher and the Thoughts, with John-Andrew Morrison reprising his role as Thought 4.

A Strange Loop played as a co-production between Firehouse Theater and the Richmond Triangle Players in Richmond, Virginia from June 27th to August 29th, 2025. The production featured a completely different cast and crew from other professional productions, directed by Katrinah Carol Lewis, and starred Marcus Antonio as Usher. The production as critically acclaimed.

== Reception ==
Upon opening off-Broadway on June 17, 2019. A Strange Loop received critical acclaim. In particular, it was praised for its emotional honesty and meta themes within both the writing and the musical compositions. It was also praised for the performances that the cast gave, calling them “physically exhaustive.” However, it was deemed as unlikely to become a Broadway show due to it potentially getting "too easily lost in a Broadway House."

A Strange Loop opened on Broadway on April 26, 2022, and also received critical acclaim. In particular, it was praised for its themes and tone which were successfully retained from the off-Broadway version and then cleaned up for the larger, more consumer based crowd which would be found on Broadway. There was a light critiquing about how working within the large institution of Broadway instead of merely peering in has made some of the commentary become shallow.

== Cast recordings ==
The original off-Broadway cast recording was released on September 27, 2019, on Yellow Sound Label. The album peaked at number 6 on the Billboard Cast Albums chart. A Broadway cast album was recorded on April 10, 2022, and released on June 10, 2022, through Sh-K-Boom Records, Yellow Sound Label, Barbara Whitman Productions, and Ghostlight Records. It debuted at number two on the Cast Albums chart.

== Box office ==
On June 14, 2022, Deadline reported that the musical filled 98% of its available seats during the week ending June 12. The musical grossed $676,316 for seven performances. The musical also broke the Lyceum Theatre box office house record for a standard 8-performance week, taking $860,496 for the week ending June 26, a $15,183 bump over the previous week. As of September 2022, A Strange Loop grossed around $14.2 million from 136,777 attendance and 157 performances.

== Awards and nominations ==
On May 4, 2020, the Pulitzer Prize for Drama was awarded to Jackson for the musical, with the committee citing the show as "a metafictional musical that tracks the creative process of an artist transforming issues of identity, race, and sexuality that once pushed him to the margins of the cultural mainstream into a meditation on universal human fears and insecurities." The show is the tenth musical to win the award, as well as the first musical written by a Black person to win and first musical to win without a Broadway run. The show premiered on Broadway in April 2022 and won the Tony Award for Best Musical. As one of its producers, Jennifer Hudson became the second Black woman to receive all four of the major American entertainment awards (EGOT).

The cast recording received a nomination for the Grammy Award for Best Musical Theater Album for the 2023 Grammy Awards.

=== Original Off-Broadway production ===
Year	Award	Category	Nominee	Result
2020	Pulitzer Prize	Pulitzer Prize for Drama	Michael R. Jackson	Won
2020	Lucille Lortel Awards	Outstanding Musical	A Strange Loop	Nominated
2020	Lucille Lortel Awards	Outstanding Director	Stephen Brackett	Nominated
2020	Lucille Lortel Awards	Outstanding Choreographer	Raja Feather Kelly	Nominated
2020	Lucille Lortel Awards	Outstanding Lead Actor in a Musical	Larry Owens	Won
2020	Lucille Lortel Awards	Outstanding Featured Actor in a Musical	John-Andrew Morrison	Won
2020	Lucille Lortel Awards	Outstanding Featured Actress in a Musical	L Morgan Lee	Nominated
2020	Lucille Lortel Awards	Outstanding Costume Design	Montana Levi Blanco	Nominated
2020	Drama Desk Awards	Outstanding Musical	A Strange Loop	Won
2020	Drama Desk Awards	Outstanding Actor in a Musical	Larry Owens	Won
2020	Drama Desk Awards	Outstanding Director of a Musical	Stephen Brackett	Won
2020	Drama Desk Awards	Outstanding Music	Michael R. Jackson	Nominated
2020	Drama Desk Awards	Outstanding Lyrics	Michael R. Jackson	Won
2020	Drama Desk Awards	Outstanding Book of a Musical	Michael R. Jackson	Won
2020	New York Drama Critics' Circle Award	Best Musical	Michael R. Jackson	Won
2020	Drama League Award	Outstanding Production of a Musical	A Strange Loop	Nominated
2020	Drama League Award	Distinguished Performance	Larry Owens	Nominated
2020	Off-Broadway Alliance Awards	Best New Musical	A Strange Loop	Won
2020	Outer Critics Circle Award	Outstanding New Off-Broadway Musical	A Strange Loop	Honored
2020	Outer Critics Circle Award	Outstanding Book of a Musical	Michael R. Jackson	Honored
2020	Outer Critics Circle Award	Outstanding New Score	Michael R. Jackson	Honored
2020	Outer Critics Circle Award	Outstanding Director of a Musical	Stephen Brackett	Honored
2020	Outer Critics Circle Award	Outstanding Choreography	Raja Feather Kelly	Honored
2020	Outer Critics Circle Award	Outstanding Actor in a Musical	Larry Owens	Honored
2020	Obie Award	Playwrighting	Michael R. Jackson	Won
2020	Obie Award	Special Citation	Creative team and ensemble – Antwayn Hopper, James Jackson, Jr., L Morgan Lee, John-Michael Lyles, John-Andrew Morrison, Larry Owens, Jason Veasey, Elijah Caldwell, Stephen Brackett, Raja Feather Kelly, Arnulfo Maldonado, Montana Levi Blanco, Jen Schriever, Alex Hawthorn, Cookie Jordan, Charlie Rosen, Rona Siddiqui, Michael R. Jackson	Won

=== Original Broadway production ===
Year	Award	Category	Nominee	Result
2022	Tony Awards	Best Musical	Barbara Whitman, Benj Pasek, Justin Paul, Zach Stafford, Hunter Arnold, Marcia Goldberg, Alex Levy, James Achilles, Osh Ashruf, A Choir Full Productions, Don Cheadle, Bridgid Coulter Cheadle, Paul Oakley Stovall, Jimmy Wilson, Annapurna Theatre, Robyn Coles, Steven Spielberg, Creative Partners Productions, Robyn Gottesdiener, Kayla Greenspan, Grove Entertainment, Eric Kuhn, Joe Lewis, Tre' Scott, Frank Marshall, Maximum Effort Productions Inc., Joey Monda, Richard Mumby, Phenomenal Media & Meena Harris, Marc Platt, Debra Martin Chase, Laurie Tisch, Cody Renard Richard, Yonge Street Theatricals, Dodge Hall Productions/JJ Malley, Cody Renard Richard, John Gore Organization, James L. Nederlander, The Shubert Organization, RuPaul Charles, Alan Cumming, Ilana Glazer, Jennifer Hudson, Mindy Kaling, Billy Porter, Page 73 Productions, Woolly Mammoth Theatre Company and Playwrights Horizons	Won
2022	Tony Awards	Best Book of a Musical	Michael R. Jackson	Won
2022	Tony Awards	Best Original Score	Michael R. Jackson	Nominated
2022	Tony Awards	Best Actor in a Musical	Jaquel Spivey	Nominated
2022	Tony Awards	Best Featured Actor in a Musical	John-Andrew Morrison	Nominated
2022	Tony Awards	Best Featured Actress in a Musical	L Morgan Lee	Nominated
2022	Tony Awards	Best Direction of a Musical	Stephen Brackett	Nominated
2022	Tony Awards	Best Scenic Design of a Musical	Arnulfo Maldonado	Nominated
2022	Tony Awards	Best Lighting Design of a Musical	Jen Schriever	Nominated
2022	Tony Awards	Best Sound Design of a Musical	Drew Levy	Nominated
2022	Tony Awards	Best Orchestrations	Charlie Rosen	Nominated
2022	Drama Desk Awards	Outstanding Actor in a Musical	Jaquel Spivey	Won
2022	Drama League Award	Outstanding Production of a Musical		Won
2022	Drama League Award	Distinguished Performance Award	Jaquel Spivey	Nominated
2022	Drama League Award	Distinguished Performance Award	L Morgan Lee	Nominated
2022	Outer Critics Circle Awards	Outstanding Actor in a Musical	Jaquel Spivey	Won
2022	Theatre World Award		Jaquel Spivey	Honoree

=== Original London production ===
Year	Award	Category	Nominee	Result
2024	Laurence Olivier Awards	Best New Musical		Nominated
