= Gigantic (musical) =

- Off-Broadway promotional art
- Music: Matthew roi Berger
- Lyrics: Randy Blair
- Book: Randy Blair and Timothy Michael Drucker
- Productions: 2009 New York Musical Theatre Festival 2011 Playhouse Square Page to Stage Program 2012 American Theatre of Actors 2015 Off-Broadway

Gigantic is a rock musical comedy written by Randy Blair, Timothy Michael Drucker, and Matthew roi Berger. It was originally performed as Fat Camp at the 2009 New York Musical Theatre Festival, directed by Alex Timbers, and produced by Carl Levin and Michael Minarik. The production was awarded the 2009 Best of Fest Award, in addition to other honors.

In 2015, the musical opened Off-Broadway as Gigantic, produced by the Vineyard Theatre at the Acorn Theatre on Theatre Row. The production, which opened on December 3, 2015, starred Max Wilcox, Ryann Redmond, Jared Loftin, Larry Owens, Bonnie Milligan, Leslie Kritzer, and Burke Moses.

== Synopsis ==
Fat Camp is the story of a rock ‘n’ roll rebel and the place where he proves he's more than meets the eye: Camp Overton, a weight loss retreat for hefty teenagers. Secrets, sex, S'mores, and self-image collide in this new musical comedy exploring the trials and triumphs of being 'the fat kid.'

== New York Musical Theatre Festival Production: Cast & Creative ==
The cast for the original NYMF production included Randy Blair (Robert Grisetti), Clarke Thorell (Mike), Sarah Saltzberg (Sandy), Carly Jibson (Daphne), Kristine Zbornik (Pearl), Ryah Nixon (Taylor), Cale Krise (Anshel), Larry Owens (Darnell), Kate Weber (Britta), Josh Segarra (Brent), and Tracy Weiler (Ashley). The ensemble was composed of Molly Hager, Melissa Bergland, Ally Bonino, Marc-Sully Saint-Fleur, Michael Mendez, Nancy Renee Braun, and Matthew David Allen.

Alex Timbers directed the production, with Connor Gallagher as choreographer and Jason DeBord as music director and arranger. Set by Wilson Chin, Costumes by Emily Rebholz, and Lighting by Jason Lyons. Casting by Michael Cassara, CSA. Associate Choreographers: Enrique Brown and Nancy Renee Braun, Assistant Musical Director: Anthony DiDonna, Props: Eric Reynolds, Production Stage Manager: Jeffrey Rodriguez.

== New York Musical Theatre Festival Production: Awards ==
New York Musical Theatre Festival 2009 Awards for Excellence

- 2009 Best of Fest Award
- Outstanding Choreography (Connor Gallagher)
- Outstanding Director/Honorable Mention (Alex Timbers)
- Outstanding Individual Performance (Cale Krise)

== American Theatre of Actors Production: Cast & Creative ==
The cast for the 2012 ATA production includes Daniel Everidge (Robert Grisetti), Marcus Neville (Mike), Janet Dickkinson (Sandy), Carly Jibson (Daphne), Molly Hager (Taylor), Cale Krise (Anshel), Larry Owens (Darnell), Kate Weber (Britta), Jared Zirilli (Brent), Kati Rediger (Ashley), Nancy Renee Braun (Aspen), and Michael Buchanan (Titus). The ensemble is composed of Michael Mendez, Charles Barksdale, Jennifer Foster, and Bridie Carroll.

Casey Hushion directed the production, with Kelly Devine as choreographer and Jason DeBord as music director and arranger. Set by Beowulf Boritt, Costumes by David Woolard, and Lighting by Jason Lyons. Casting by Michael Cassara, CSA. Associate Director and Assistant Choreographer: Dontee Kiehn, Assistant Music Director: Jodie Moore, Props: Buist Bickley, Production Stage Manager: Rachel A. Wolff.

== Song list ==
1. Welcome to Tomorrow
2. Can't Take Away My Summer
3. Taylor & Daphne
4. Brent von Bingenberger
5. Anshel's Song
6. Hungry for It
7. Candymen
8. First Kiss
9. Picture Take Me
10. Top of the World
11. All On You
12. Thinner
13. Take Back Your Summer
14. Cannonball
15. Hanging On
16. One Shot
17. Feels A Little Bit Like Love
