= Jaquel Spivey =

American actor

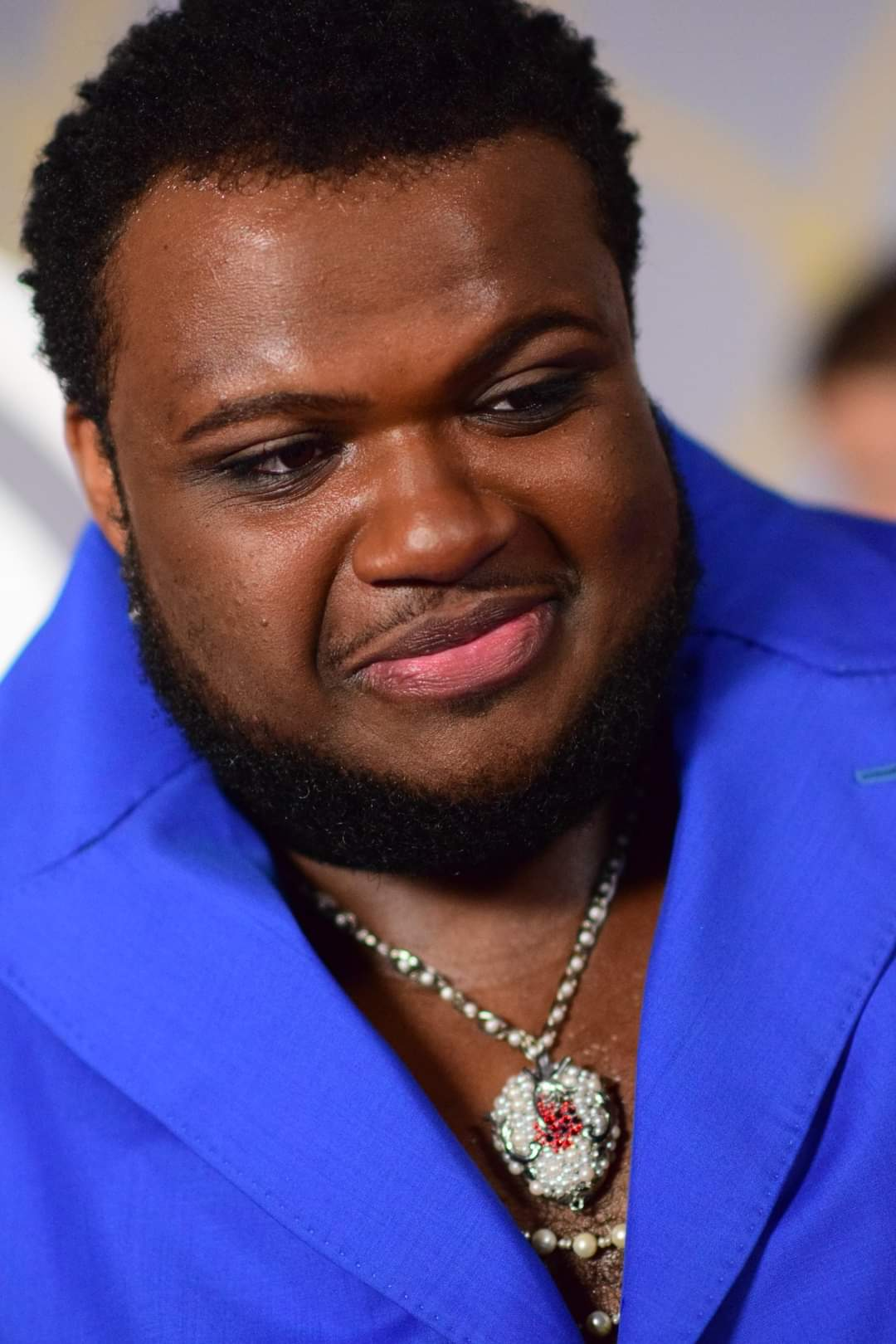
- Spivey at the 75th Tony Awards in 2022
- Born: November 13, 1998 (age 27); Raleigh, North Carolina
- Education: Point Park University
- Occupation: Actor

Jaquel Spivey (born November 13, 1998) is an American actor. He won a Drama Desk Award for Outstanding Actor in a Musical and received a Tony Award nomination for Best Actor in a Musical for his starring role as Usher in the Broadway theatre production of A Strange Loop in 2022. He also earned a Grammy Award nomination for the cast recording of the show.

== Personal life and career ==
Spivey grew up in Raleigh, North Carolina, raised by a single mother, before moving to New Jersey to live with his aunt. Spivey stated that he grew up "in a household of black women" whom he credited for instilling confidence in him and his identity as "very feminine, queer, and outspoken."

He graduated from Montclair High School in Montclair, New Jersey. He attended Point Park University in Pittsburgh, Pennsylvania, and received a degree in musical theatre in May 2021. At Point Park, he portrayed Louis in a production of Sunday in the Park with George.

After Larry Owens left A Strange Loop following its off-Broadway run, Spivey was cast as Usher in July 2021 when the show transferred to Woolly Mammoth Theatre Company in Washington, D.C., for a seven-week tryout. The show then moved to New York City at the Lyceum Theatre, with Spivey making his Broadway debut with the opening of the production in April 2022. A Strange Loop earned 11 Tony Award nominations in 2022, including one for Best Actor in a Musical for Spivey's performance. Spivey, as the principal vocalist, and the rest of the cast received a Grammy Award nomination for Best Musical Theater Album. Spivey won the Drama Desk Award for Outstanding Actor in a Musical, He was also nominated for a Distinguished Performance Award for the Drama League Awards, and won the Outer Critics Circle Awards Outstanding Actor in a Musical and was honored with a Theatre World Award. A Strange Loop closed on Broadway in January 2023.

In December 2022, Spivey was cast as Damian Hubbard in Mean Girls, a film adaptation of the Broadway show of the same name, which itself is based on the 2004 film Mean Girls.

== Filmography ==
=== Film ===
Year	Title	Role	Notes
2024	Mean Girls	Damian Hubbard	
2025	Queens of the Dead	Sam	

=== Television ===
Year	Title	Role	Notes
2026	The Beauty	Jeremy (Pre Beauty)	Episode: "Beautiful Pilot"

=== Theatre ===
Year	Title	Role	Notes
2022–2023	A Strange Loop	Usher	Lyceum Theatre, Broadway

== Awards and nominations ==
Year	Award	Category	Work	Result	Ref.
2022	Tony Awards	Best Performance by a Leading Actor in a Musical	A Strange Loop	Nominated	
2022	Drama Desk Award	Outstanding Actor in a Musical	A Strange Loop	Won	
2022	Drama League Award	Distinguished Performance Award	A Strange Loop	Nominated	
2022	Outer Critics Circle Awards	Outstanding Actor in a Musical	A Strange Loop	Won	
2022	Theatre World Award		A Strange Loop	Honoree	
2023	Grammy Awards	Grammy Award for Best Musical Theater Album	A Strange Loop	Nominated	
