= Utopia Now! =

Studio album by Rosie Tucker
- Released: March 22, 2024
- Studios: Pietown Sound; Sucker Studio
- Genre: Indie rock
- Length: 37:16
- Language: English
- Label: Sentimental Records
- Producers: Rosie Tucker; Wolfy

Rosie Tucker chronology
Never Not Never Not Never Not (Casio) (2024)	Utopia Now! (2024)

I was going for humor to hang on my anger and bitterness, and I think a lot of this record was about trying to recognize that bitterness can be internally caustic if you hold onto it and try to figure out how to excise that. "Lightbulb," for me, synthesizes a lot of what I was thinking about during this record. It deals with technology, as I literally had a pack of lightbulbs that were color changing and the app on my phone wanted the permission to be able to read my text messages and that freaked me out, and I related the paranoia of this to how a whole generation of people are caught in this space where we've grown up in a situation where we cannot separate what we love to do from a very mechanized relationship with metrics – play versus economics.

— Rosie Tucker on lyrical themes in Utopia Now!

Utopia Now! is a 2024 studio album by American singer-songwriter Rosie Tucker. It has received positive reviews from critics.

== Reception ==
Writing at BrooklynVegan, Amanda Hatfield praised the anti-capitalist lyrics on the album and stated that "it's a satisfying followup to Sucker Supreme (2021) without straying too far from what made that album so appealing". Avery Gregurich of PopMatters rated Utopia Now! an 8 out of 10, calling it "an alchemistic mix of post-pandemic mall punk and dream pop" where "Tucker turns ironic ennui and allegory into truly enchanting pop songs". In Rolling Stone, Rob Sheffield characterized this release as "definitely a portrait of North America in our moment, set in a culture where non-sponsored fun is just a rumor, where your phone is spying on you, where every small-time artist has to turn into a full-time huckster just to keep making their art" and compared the music to Juliana Hatfield, Minutemen, and that dog. In June 2024, writers at Stereogum did a roundup of the best albums of the year so far and ranked Utopia Now! at 32, with James Rettig stating "Tucker's songs are sarcastic and wry and unbelievably catchy". Nate Sloan of Vulture called this release "something of a fresh start" and "a distinctly different artistic approach" for Tucker.

=== Year-end lists ===
Publication	List	Rank	Ref.
NPR	The 50 Best Albums of 2024	—N/a	

== Track listing ==
All songs written by Rosie Tucker, except "Eternal Life", written by Shira Small. All tracks produced by Wolfy, except "Maylene", produced by Tucker.

No.	Title	Length
1.	"Lightbulb"	2:46
2.	"All My Exes Live in Vortexes"	2:30
3.	"Gil Scott Albatross"	2:37
4.	"Paperclip Maximizer"	3:24
5.	"Maylene"	3:15
6.	"Big Fish/No Fun"	3:23
7.	"Suffer! Like You Mean It"	3:04
8.	"Unending Bliss"	2:54
9.	"White Savior Myth"	0:54
10.	"Obscura"	4:51
11.	"Me Minus One Atom"	2:23
12.	"Utopia Now!"	1:47
13.	"Eternal Life"	3:28
Total length:		37:18

== Personnel ==
- Rosie Tucker – guitar, keyboards, synthesizer, vocals (all tracks); bass guitar (4, 5, 8, 10, 13), programming, production (5)
- Keith Armstrong – recording, audio engineering, mixing (all tracks)
- Sam Becht – drums (tracks 2–4, 6–9)
- First Ever Boys – backing vocals (track 2)
  - Ollie Bruer
  - Genna Projansky
  - Jimmy Villaflor
- Jett Galindo – audio mastering (all tracks)
- Genna Projansky – bass guitar (tracks 2, 3, 6, 7, 9); backing vocals (2)
- Sarchasm – backing vocals on (track 2)
  - Alex Botkin
  - Mateo Campos-Seligman
  - Stevie Campos-Seligman
- Marta Tiesenga – saxophone (track 13)
- Madi Vogt – drums (tracks 1, 5, 10, 11, 13)
- Wolfy – guitar, keyboards, synthesizer, programming, recording, engineering, production (all tracks except 5)

Credits adapted from Bandcamp.

== See also ==
- 2024 in American music
- 2024 in rock music
- List of 2024 albums
