= Linda Good =

American musician

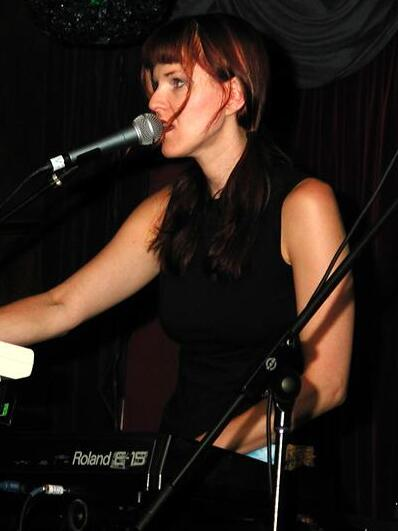
- Good in 2001

Background information
- Born: Linda Elaine Good; March 1, 1965 (age 61); Ohio, U.S.
- Genres: Alternative pop, poptronica, musical theater
- Instruments: Keyboards, piano, vocals, guitar
- Years active: 1994–present
- Label: Whirl-i-gig Records
- Member of: The Twigs
- Website: lindagood.com twigs.com ladyship.twigs.com

Linda Good is an American musician, composer, writer, songwriter and producer. She is the co-founder, with her twin sister Laura, of the alternative pop band The Twigs. Good has also toured as a keyboardist with Jane's Addiction (2001),The Mars Volta (2002), the Lisa Marie Presley Band (2002–2006) and Bitter:Sweet (2007–2008). She co-wrote the musical Ladyship, which was an Official Grand Jury Selection of the New York Musical Festival (NYMF) and debuted in New York City at the Alice Griffin Jewel Box Theater in July 2019. Ladyship was also a finalist for the 2020 Richard Rodgers Award for Musical Theater. She and her twin sister Laura were born in Ohio, lived in Mexico City as toddlers, and grew up in Chicago. She is a graduate of the Chicago Academy for Performing Arts High School in Chicago, the University of Illinois, and studied abroad at University College-Cardiff, Wales. She has been based out of Los Angeles since 2000.

== Co-writer of the musical "Ladyship" ==
Linda Good and Laura Good wrote the music, book and lyrics for a new original historical musical entitled Ladyship. Ladyship was inspired by true events during the time when approximately 25,000 convict women were sent from England to Australia from 1788 and 1868 under the British government's Transportation Act – a supposedly more humane alternative to the death penalty. The musical follows the characters of two Irish teenage sisters, Alice and Mary, along with some of their fellow convicts, and how they narrowly survive the perilous journey. Ladyship was an Official Grand Jury Selection of the New York Musical Festival (NYMF) 2019, and made its debut in New York City at the Alice Griffin Jewel Box Theater on July 10, 2019.

The debut production of Ladyship featured Maddie Shea Baldwin (Bright Star) as Alice Reed, Caitlin Cohn (Lolita, My Love) as Mary Reed, Jennifer Blood (Matilda the Musical) as Lady Jane Sharp, Jordon Bolden (TV: Daredevil, Law & Order: SVU) as Marcus "Finn" Findley, Noelle Hogan (Fun Home, US Tour) as Kitty MacDougal, Justin R.G. Holcomb (Honor Bound) as Zeke Cropper, Lisa Karlin (Ragtime, Revival) as Abigail Gainsborough, Brandi Knox (Hairspray, Regional) as Mrs. Pickering, Quentin Oliver Lee (The Phantom of the Opera, US Tour) as Captain Josiah Adams, and Trevor St. John-Gilbert (Les Misérables, Regional) as Lieutenant Brandon Adams. The production featured scenic design by David Goldstein, costume design by Whitney Locher, and lighting design by Sam Gordon. Patrick Calhoun as sound designer, Deb Gaouette was props designer, Adele Rylands was the fight director, Sara Brians was choreographer, and Michael Danek was the production stage manager. Michael Cassara Casting was the casting director, Visceral Entertainment was the production manager, Connor Delves did social media and Kampfire PR was publicist. Simone Allen was music director.

Ladyship: High School Edition premiered January 13, 2023 at Clear Brook High School by the Clear Brook Players, in Friendswood, TX. It was directed by Asa Smith and Michelle Smith, with a cast and crew of over 45 high-school actors and theater crew. Music direction was by Stephanie Cramer, and choreography was by Hayden West. For the performance run, The CB Players partnered with Hands of Justice, a survivor-led anti-trafficking nonprofit organization that helps survivors of sex-trafficking reclaim their lives.

Linda Good and Laura Good of The Twigs produced a concept album studio recording of Ladyship entitled Ladyship the Musical (Original Concept Recording), released July 2024.

== The Twigs ==
She has written and co-produced over four albums with The Twigs.

- Bring Me the Head of Eternity (1996) Whirl-i-Gig Records
- The Universe Tonight (2001) Whirl-i-Gig Records
- You Say Ah (2005) Whirl-i-Gig Records
- Jump Right In (2013) Whirl-i-gig Records
- Flying Kites on Christmas (Released December 7, 2018) Christmas single. Whirl-i-Gig Records.
- Ladyship the Musical (Original Concept Recording) (Released July 12, 2024) Whirl-i-gig Records. Written and Produced by Laura Good and Linda Good of The Twigs.
- "Geminae" (EP) (Released October 8, 2024) Whirl-i-gig Records. Co-produced by Linda Good, Laura Good and Bryan Rheude.

== Solo artist ==
In June 2009 Good released her first solo album, Love is a Curious Thing on Whirligig Records. She played many of the instruments on the album (piano, keyboards, guitar, bass, and percussion) and produced and recorded most of the album in her home studio. The single "Love Is..." was featured on the TV Show (the new) 90210 (TV Series). The album also features a duet with Chris Trapper of The Push Stars on the song "Bullseye."

In June 2008, the advance EP A Dog Is a Dog featuring "Love Is..." reached top 5 requested albums on Los Angeles radio station KCRW.

== Music producer and songwriter ==
Good frequently collaborates with other artists and formed the folk-tronica duo The Plush Interiors with James Combs. They did a video of "Lately I Wonder" directed by Michael Klima, which won several awards. Their music has been heard on many TV shows including HBO's Entourage, Gossip Girl, Curl Girls, and in the award-winning documentary American Teen. Good also collaborated with singer-songwriter Cindy Alexander on co-writing the song "Lightning" from the album, While the Angels Sigh on Blue Elan Records.

As a music producer, Good has produced other artists including the punk-folk debut "Girls Cry Wine" of LA-based songwriter Cailyx. She produced the debut album All Night Through for the Americana duo, The Shaker Sisters (Robyn Monks and Jen Zias), as well as co-wrote several songs on the record. The title track "All Night Through" was heard on Season 2's opening episode of HBO's hit show True Blood.

Good was featured on the compilation album "Sony/ATV Classic Covers Project, Vol.1" where she sang and produced a trip-hop version of Willie Nelson's "Blue Eyes Crying in the Rain".

She has also performed with Stew of The Negro Problem, Willie Wisely, and lent her vocal tracks on "Drifting", a duet with Chris Trapper on The Push Stars' record, Paint the Town (33rd St. Records).

On VH1 Divas Duets: An Honors Concert For The VH1 Save The Music Foundation aired live from the MGM Grand Las Vegas on May 22, 2003, Good sang backup vocals and played B3 Organ as part of the band for Pat Benatar, who appeared as a special guest at the sixth annual VH1 Divas concert, VH1 Divas Duets, performing "Heartbreaker" with Neil Giraldo and headliner Lisa Marie Presley.

== Media ==
- Hoekstra, Dave (April 4, 1996). "Twigs' bold debut sets them apart". Chicago Sun-Times.
- Loncaric, Terry (February 27, 1997). "These Twigs don't bend". The Star – Orland Park.
- "Slender Grooves". (Oct 14–27, 2002). Music Connection, p. 26.
- Interview with Linda Good by Ted Allen (July 2002). "Gotta Be Good". Chicago Magazine p. 20.
- Blaser, Linda (September 27, 2013). "Sisters branch out..." LakeForester/Sun-times.
- Broadway World News (May 13, 2019). "LADYSHIP, A NEW MUSICAL On The Founding Mothers Of Australia Announced at NYMF"Broadway World
- Calhoon, Zack (June 8, 2019). "People You Should Know – Linda Good"Visible Soul
- Sathe, Jane Dunlap (June 15, 2019). "'LadyShip' alt-pop musical follows the harrowing journey of 'mothers of Australia'"The Daily Progress
- Skethway, Nathan (June 27, 2019). "Look Inside the 2019 New York Musical Festival's Preview" Playbill
- Soltes, John (July 8, 2019). "Hollywood SoapBox – Interview with Laura Good and Linda Good"
- CANVAS REBEL Interview (February 12, 2024) "Meet Linda Good"
