= Perez Hilton Saves the Universe (or at least the greater Los Angeles area): the Musical! =

2008 stage musical

Perez Hilton Saves the Universe (or at least the greater Los Angeles area): the Musical! is an original musical with book by Randy Blair and Timothy Michael Drucker, lyrics by Randy Blair, and music by Zachary Redler. The show, according to press materials, "follows a normal day in the life of celebrity gossip blogger, Perez Hilton. Well, were it not for the evil plans of Islamic terrorists. And Kathy Griffin. Throughout the course of the evening, Perez must deal with the demons of love, ego, and celebrity, all whilst saving LA from imminent nuclear disaster. With a pop-infused score and dozens of celebrity impersonations, "Perez Hilton... the Musical!" reveals the inner workings of a society obsessed with itself. Oh, and it's kinda funny."

"Perez..." premiered to much advanced buzz at the 2008 New York International Fringe Festival in New York City, with direction and choreography by Connor Gallagher. The sold-out musical was then moved to the Barrow Street Theatre and extended as part of the Fringe Encores series, which features the most popular of the Fringe's yearly offerings.

The production was awarded Outstanding Musical of the 2008 Fringe season.

== Original cast ==
- Randy Blair (Perez Hilton)
- Lindsay Nicole Chambers (Amy Winehouse/Joan Rivers/Mary-Kate Olsen/etc.)
- Timothy Michael Drucker (Keb)
- Sevan Greene (Habib)
- Laura Jordan (Kathy Griffin)
- Andrew Keenan-Bolger (Zac Efron/Tom Cruise/Sarah Jessica Parker/etc.)
- Ana Nogueira (Paris Hilton/Britney Spears/Ashley Olsen/etc.)
- Dana Steingold (Alyssa)
- Jason Veasey (R. Kelly/Queen Latifah/Jaleel White/etc.)

Replacements:

- Sara Chase (Amy Winehouse/Joan Rivers/Mary-Kate Olsen/etc.)

== Musical numbers ==
- 1. Pornoverture - Perez, Zac Efron, Band
- 2. What Perez Says - Perez and Company
- 3. It's Kathy! - Kathy Griffin and Company
- 4. The Assistant - Alyssa
- 5. Blow Them All Away - Habib and Kebab
- 6. Paris' Phone Call - Paris Hilton and Alyssa
- 7. Lonely at the Middle - Perez, Kebab, and Company
- 8. Amy's Phone Call - Amy Winehouse and Alyssa
- 9. Taking Control - Company
- 10. Do You Hear the Celebrities? - Paris Hilton, Amy Winehouse, R. Kelly, Zac Efron
- 11. Perez's Lament (Shoot Him) - Perez
- 12. The Assistant (Reprise) - Alyssa
- 13. Mistress of Disguise - Kathy Griffin and Crew
- 14. Santa Britney - Rumer Willis, Suri Cruise, Lourdes Leon, Zahara Jolie-Pitt
- 15. Celebrity - Paris Hilton, Amy Winehouse, R. Kelly, Zac Efron
- 16. Deus ex Machina (Eat It, Lick It, Snort It, Fuck It) - Britney Spears
- 17. Finale (Bitch!) - Company

== Awards ==
- Outstanding Musical - New York International Fringe Festival Overall Excellence Awards 2008
- Best Musical- Talkin Broadway Summer Theater Festival Citation 2008
