= Playwrights Horizons Theater School =

School at the New York University

Coordinates: 40°43′45.96″N 73°59′31.77″W

Playwrights Horizons Theater School is one of ten studios that make up the Tisch School of the Arts Undergraduate Department of Drama at New York University. It serves as the educational wing of prominent off-broadway theater company Playwrights Horizons.

== History ==
The theater school was founded in 1983 when New York University approached then Playwrights Horizons artistic director Andre Bishop in an effort to expand its educational offering to include the training of directors, stage managers, and playwrights.

The program has since expanded its training programs to include acting, musical performance, dramaturgy, design and producing, making it one of the few undergraduate interdisciplinary theater training programs in the country, and amongst a smaller list of undergraduate theater programs that offer directing training.

== Programs ==
The school provides interdisciplinary theater training to students in the Undergraduate Drama Program of New York University's Tisch School of the Arts. Lectures in professional theater as well as practical seminars with visiting artists are available. Students would graduate from the four-year program with a Bachelor of Fine Arts degree.

== Leadership ==
The theater school's current Director is Nicole Wee, who was appointed in September 2022 after having served as the Interim Director since May 2022. Wee succeeded Tomi Tsunoda. She oversees all of the school's academic and artistic activities.

== Alumni ==
Notable alumni of Playwrights Horizons Theatre School include:

- Elizabeth Alderfer
- De'Adre Aziza
- Elna Baker
- Aziza Barnes
- Mia Barron
- Ashley Bell
- Stephen Brackett
- Janicza Bravo
- Sam Catlin
- Rachel Chavkin
- Anna Drezen
- Azie Mira Dungey
- Raúl Esparza
- Andrew Farmer
- Christian Finnegan
- Adam Gwon
- Leslye Headland
- Jessica Hecht
- Perez Hilton
- Tina Huang
- Diarra Kilpatrick
- Stephanie Kurtzuba
- Sean Maher
- Camila Mendes
- Bennett Miller
- Sam Pinkleton
- Keith Powell
- Mara Wilson

== See also ==
- Playwrights Horizons
