= Antwayn Hopper =

American actor

- Education: Carnegie Mellon University (BFA)
- Occupation: Actor

Antwayn Hopper is a stage and film actor best known for originating the role of Thought #6 in A Strange Loop and for his role in the television series Will Trent.

== Early life ==
Hopper's family moved to Topeka, Kansas, in 1991 when his father was stationed at Fort Riley. He attended Bishop Elementary School. Starting in middle school and throughout high school, he became active in the performing arts, including involvement with the Helen Hocker Theater at the Topeka Civic Theatre and extracurricular theater groups. He trained at the Accent Academy of Performing Arts.

Hopper graduated from high school in 2003 and studied at the School of Drama at Carnegie Mellon University. Upon graduating in 2007 he moved to New York City to pursue a career in acting.

== Career ==
Hopper made his Broadway debut as a swing in the 2009 revival of Hair. In 2012, he appeared as Kilroy in Camino Real at the Goodman Theatre. He was in the 2022 Original Broadway Cast of A Strange Loop, playing Thought #6. He had been involved in the show's development for six years before the show's Broadway run. In 2024, he was cast as Macavity in the off-Broadway run of Cats: The Jellicle Ball.

Hopper made an appearance in the film A Thousand and One. In 2025, he played Rafael Wexford in the ABC show Will Trent. On November 12, Hopper was in the ensemble of the industry reading of David James Parr's SLAP&TICKLE.

== Personal life ==
Hopper is gay.
