= Stephen Brackett =

American theatre director

- Education: New York University (BFA)
- Occupation: Director

Stephen Brackett is an American stage director best known for directing the Broadway musicals A Strange Loop, Be More Chill, and The Lightning Thief. For his work on A Strange Loop, Brackett received a nomination for the Tony Award for Best Direction of a Musical at the 75th Tony Awards.

== Early life and education ==
Brackett has a BFA from New York University, where he attended Playwrights Horizons Theater School.

== Career ==
Brackett was assistant director to Annie Dorsen on the Public Theatre and Broadway productions of Passing Strange.

Off-Broadway, Brackett has directed To My Girls (at Second Stage Theatre), The Mad Ones (59E59 Theaters), City Of (Playwrights Horizons), and Buyer & Cellar (Barrow Street).

His Off-Broadway productions of A Strange Loop (originally produced at Playwrights Horizons, Be More Chill (at the Pershing Square Signature Center), and The Lightning Thief (at the Lucille Lortel Theater), all subsequently transferred to Broadway. A Strange Loop won the Drama Desk Award, Drama League Award, Outer Critics Circle Award, and Tony Award for Best Musical. For his efforts, Brackett was Tony-nominated for Best Direction of a Musical, and received the Best Director Drama Desk and Outer Critics Circle awards.

== Awards and nominations ==
Year	Award	Category	Work	Result
2020	Lucille Lortel Award	Outstanding Director	A Strange Loop	Nominated
2020	Drama Desk Award	Outstanding Director of a Musical	A Strange Loop	Won
2020	Outer Critics Circle Award	Outstanding Director of a Musical	A Strange Loop	Won
2020	Obie Award	Special Citation	A Strange Loop	Won
2022
2022	Tony Award	Best Direction of a Musical	A Strange Loop	Nominated
