= Larry Owens (actor) =

American comedian, writer, and singer

- Owens in 2026
- Born: Baltimore, Maryland, U.S.
- Occupations: Actor; writer; singer; comedian
- Years active: 2015–present
- Known for: A Strange Loop

Larry Owens is an American comedian, actor, writer, and singer. He received a Lucille Lortel Award and a Drama Desk Award for his leading performance in the off-Broadway musical A Strange Loop. He has acted on television shows including Search Party, High Maintenance, Modern Love and Abbott Elementary.

== Early life and education ==
Owens was born and raised in East Baltimore, Maryland. He named Hairspray as a musical he saw growing up that helped him see musical theater as a career path. He loved the work of Stephen Sondheim and nurtured his interest at the performing arts camp Stagedoor Manor.

Owens graduated from Episcopal High School in Alexandria, Virginia in 2008. He trained in acting and improvisational theater at Steppenwolf, where Tarell Alvin McCraney, Amy Morton and K. Todd Freeman were some of his instructors.

== Career ==
Owens moved to New York in 2015 to pursue a professional career in the performance arts. He was a volunteer at the Musical Theatre Factory and there connected with playwright Michael R. Jackson, who wrote A Strange Loop.

=== Theatre ===
Owens performed in the musical theater productions Spamilton and Gigantic. He also performed for Catherine Cohen's Cabernet Cabaret and hosted his own monthly show Decolonize Your Mind with Karen Chee.

In 2019, he received critical acclaim for his performance in Michael R. Jackson's A Strange Loop, performed off-Broadway at Playwrights Horizons and directed by Stephen Brackett. Vinson Cunningham write in The New Yorker: "Owens... performs Jackson’s songs with power, humor, and pathos, filling in the textual gaps in Usher’s characterization with an entire life’s worth of mannerism and style." For his performance he won a Lucille Lortel Award and a Drama Desk Award for Outstanding Actor in a Musical, among other accolades.

In July 2021, he starred in the original solo show Sondheimia, performed at Feinstein's/54 Below.

=== Television ===
Owens was a staff writer for the truTV game show Paid Off. He acted on season four of High Maintenance as well as the television shows Search Party, Abbott Elementary, Dash & Lily, Life & Beth, and Modern Love. He is a voice actor in the Amazon animated series Fairfax.

== Personal life ==
Owens is queer.

== Filmography ==
=== Stage ===
Year	Title	Role	Location	Notes	Ref
2012	Fat Camp	Darnell	American Theatre of Actors	Off-Broadway	
2014	Grease	Roger	The Muny		
2014	Dreamgirls	Tiny Joe Dixon / TV Stage Manager / The Five Tuxedos / Film Executive / Security Guard / Ensemble	Gerding Theater at the Armory		
2015	Gigantic	Darnell	Vineyard Theatre	Off-Broadway	
2016–2017	Spamilton	Sondheim / Little Orphan Annie	Triad Theatre	Off-Broadway	
2017–2018	Spamilton	Sondheim / Little Orphan Annie	Puerto Rican Traveling Theater	Off-Broadway	
2019	A Strange Loop	Usher	Playwrights Horizons	Off-Broadway	
2021	Sondheimia	Protagonist	Feinstein's/54 Below	Solo show; also writer.	

=== Television ===
Year	Title	Role	Notes	Ref.
2020	Betty	Devereaux	1 episode	
2020	High Maintenance	Arnold	1 episode	
2020	The Great Work Begins: Scenes from Angels in America	Belize	Television movie	
2020	Helpsters	Billy Bug	1 episode	
2020	Dash & Lily	Artsy Guide	1 episode	
2021	Modern Love	Toby Dooley	Episode: "How Do You Remember Me?"	
2021–2022	Fairfax	Jules (voice)	Recurring role	
2021–2022	Search Party	Idiot / Ritchie	Recurring role	
2022	Life & Beth	Clark	Recurring role	
2022	Ziwe	Pastor	Episode: "Critical Race Theory"	
2022–2025	Abbott Elementary	Zach	7 episodes	
2022	Harley Quinn	Music Meister (voice)	Episode: "It's a Swamp Thing"	

=== Film ===
Year	Title	Role	Notes	Ref.
2018	To Dust	Stanley		
2018	A Chest of Drawers	Barnaby Cromwell	Short film	
2019	Last Ferry	Shane		
2021	Puppet Me	Host	Short film	
2023	Problemista	Craigslist		
2023	Dumb Money	Chris		
2023	Urkel Saves Santa: the Movie	Santa (voice)		
TBA	Silent Retreat	Eric	Post-production	

== Awards and nominations ==
=== For A Strange Loop ===
==== 2019 ====
- Nominee, Antonyo Award for Best Actor in a Musical Off-Broadway

==== 2020 ====
- Nominee, Drama League, Distinguished Performance Award
- Winner, Outer Critics Circle Award for Outstanding Actor in a Musical
- Winner, Lucille Lortel Award for Outstanding Lead Actor in a Musical
- Winner, Drama Desk Award for Outstanding Actor in a Musical
- Winner, Obie Award, Special Citation to the Creative Team and Ensemble
