= Rosie Tucker =

American musician

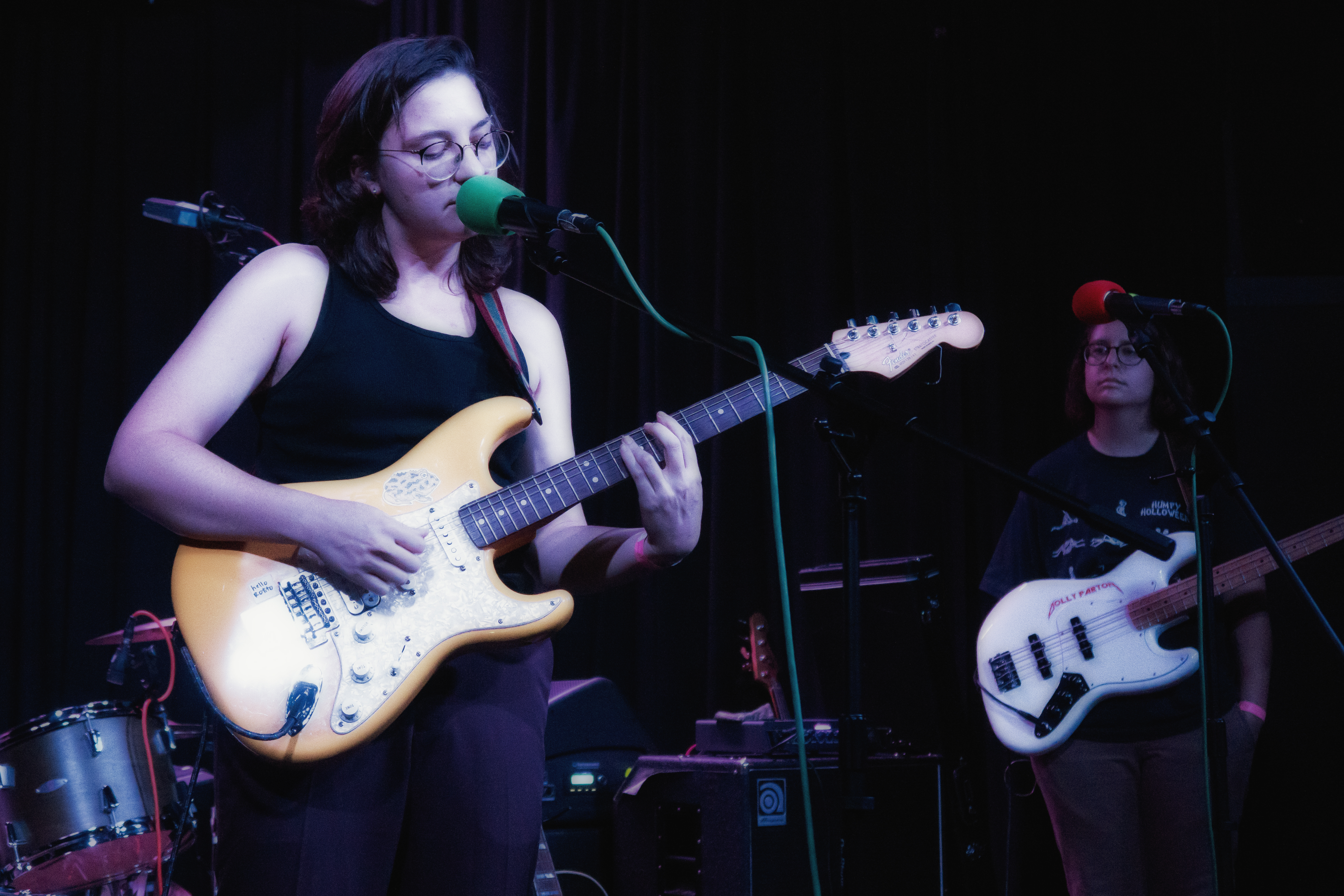
- Tucker and Wolfy (right) in 2021

Background information
- Born: 1994 (age 31–32)
- Origin: Los Angeles, California
- Years active: 2015–present
- Label: Epitaph Records

Rosie Tucker is an American singer-songwriter from Los Angeles, California. Pitchfork has acclaimed Tucker's "surging pop hooks and sharp lyricism".

== History ==
Tucker is a native of the San Fernando Valley. Tucker's mother grew up on a farm in Illinois, later becoming a computer programmer, and their father was a United States Marine who served in the Iraq War; the two met in a laundromat. Tucker started singing as a toddler, studied music at the University of Southern California, and in college grew disillusioned with organized religion.

Tucker self-released their first full-length album in 2015 titled Lowlight. In 2019, Tucker announced their second full-length album, Never Not Never Not Never Not, which was released on New Professor Music. In 2021, Tucker announced they had signed to Epitaph Records. They also announced their third full-length album titled Sucker Supreme. The album was released on April 30, 2021. The album was listed on Pitchfork's list of "29 Great Records You May Have Missed: Spring 2021". Tucker released a fourth album of songs no longer than one minute and 16 seconds, Tiny Songs Volume 1, in September 2023. Their fifth studio album, Utopia Now!, was released on March 22, 2024.

== Personal life ==
Tucker identifies as queer and uses they/them pronouns.

== Discography ==
=== Studio albums ===
- Lowlight (2015; independent)
- Never Not Never Not Never Not (2019; New Professor Music)
- Sucker Supreme (2021; Epitaph)
- Tiny Songs Volume 1 (2023)
- Utopia Now! (2024)

=== Remix albums ===
- Sucker Supreme to Study and Relax To (Wolfy ft. Rosie Tucker) (2021; Epitaph)
- Never Not Never Not Never Not (Casio) (Wolfy ft. Rosie Tucker) (2024; Sentimental)

=== Singles ===
Year	Title	Album	Label
2018	"Fault Lines"	Never Not Never Not Never Not	New Professor
2018	"Spinster Cycle"	Never Not Never Not Never Not	New Professor
2019	"Gay Bar"	Never Not Never Not Never Not	New Professor
2019	"Habit"	Never Not Never Not Never Not	New Professor
2019	"Lauren"	Never Not Never Not Never Not	New Professor
2019	"Ambrosia"	Sucker Supreme	Epitaph
2020	"Brand New Beast"	Sucker Supreme	Epitaph
2020	"Arrow" (Jeffrey Lewis cover)	Sucker Supreme	Epitaph
2021	"Six Foot Under" (Bob Fryfogle cover)	non-album single	Epitaph
2023	"Unending Bliss"	Utopia Now!	Sentimental
2024	"All My Exes Live In Vortexes"	Utopia Now!	Sentimental
2024	"Paperclip Maximizer"	Utopia Now!	Sentimental
2024	"Big Fish/No Fun"	Utopia Now!	Sentimental
2024	"All I Want Is Utopia Now!"	non-album single	Sentimental

=== Music videos ===
Year	Title	Director
2019	"Habit"	Julia Lebow
2020	"Arrow" (lyric video)	Rosie Tucker
2021	"Habanero"	Katharine White
2021	"Barbara Ann" (lyric video)	Rosie Tucker; Jason Link and Eli Rae
2021	"Ambrosia"	Daae Kim (animation)
2023	"Unending Bliss"	Vanesa De La Mora (animation)
2024	"All My Exes Live in Vortexes"	Monica Moore-Suriyage
