= L Morgan Lee =

American musical theater actress

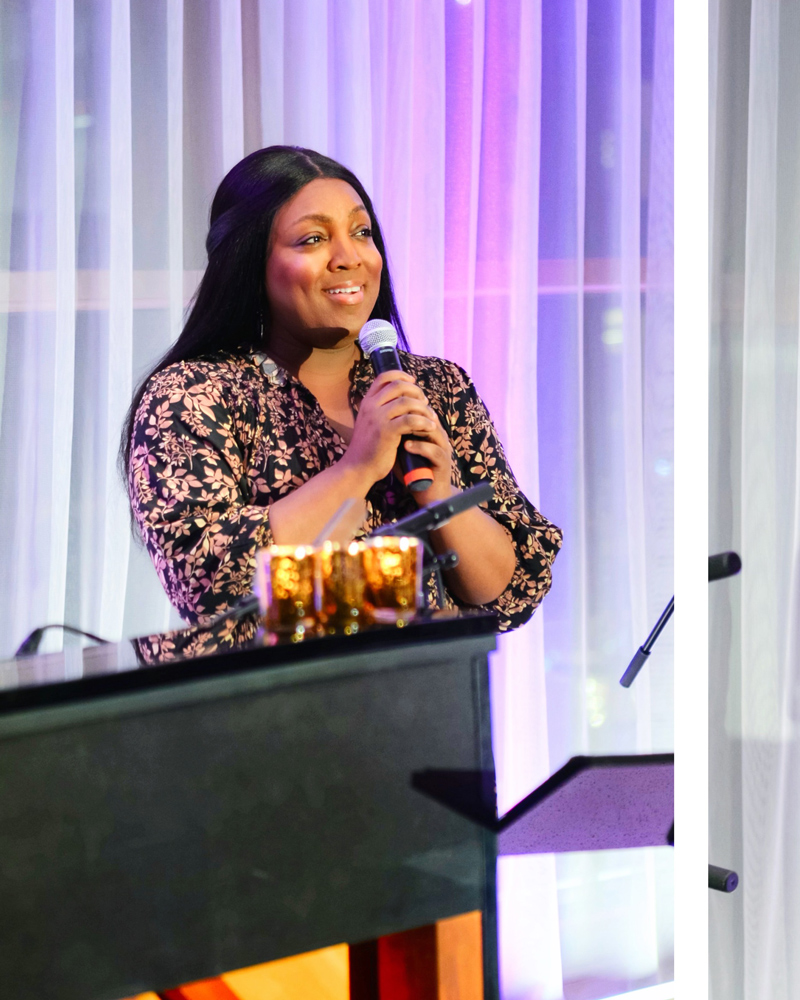
- Lee at a Paper event in November 2022
- Education: University of the Arts
- Occupations: Actress, singer
- Website: lmorganlee.com

L Morgan Lee is an American theatre actress and singer. She was nominated for the 2022 Tony Award for Best Performance by a Featured Actress in a Musical for her performance in A Strange Loop on Broadway, and was credited as the first openly transgender actor to be nominated for a Tony Award.

== Early life ==
Lee grew up in suburban Maryland. She began performing in her early childhood by singing in her nursery school's talent show. She studied musical theater at the University of the Arts in Philadelphia.

== Career ==
Lee joined A Strange Loop in 2015 after Michael R. Jackson reached out to her on Facebook and asked her to do a reading. She continued with the show during its off-Broadway premiere at Playwrights Horizons, playing the role of Thought 1, where she won an Obie Award and was nominated for a Lucille Lortel Award for Outstanding Featured Actress in a Musical. In 2021, Lee portrayed Lili Elbe in a workshop for a musical adaptation of The Danish Girl in England.

Lee transferred with A Strange Loop to Broadway in 2022. She was nominated for the Tony Award for Best Performance by a Featured Actress in a Musical at the 75th Tony Awards, becoming the first openly transgender performer to be nominated for a Tony.

In 2025, it was announced Lee would direct a one-night benefit concert of The Drowsy Chaperone at Carnegie Hall with a cast composed entirely of trans and non-binary performers.

== Discography ==
=== Cast & concept recordings ===
- A Strange Loop – Original Cast Recording (2019), Grammy Award nominated album
- Soft Butter – Concept Recording (2019)

=== Collaborative projects ===
- The Broadway Rainbow Lullaby Album - "The Dream" (2021)
- Her Sound: Volume 3 - "Nazareth" (2022)
- Album (Joe Iconis) - "Play the Princess" (2022)

== Stage ==
Key
†	Denotes upcoming roles

Year	Title	Role	Venue	Ref
2019	A Strange Loop	Thought 1	Off-Broadway, Playwrights Horizons	
2021	A Strange Loop	Thought 1	Regional, Woolly Mammoth Theatre Company	
2021	The Danish Girl	Lili Elbe	Workshop, New Theatre Peterborough	
2022	A Strange Loop	Thought 1	Broadway, Lyceum Theatre	
2024	A Complicated Woman	Nina Mae	Regional, Goodspeed Musicals	
2024	Fiorello!	Mitzi Travers	Concert, Classic Stage Company	
2025	All Shook Up	Sylvia	Regional, Goodspeed Musicals	
2025	The Drowsy Chaperone	Director	Benefit Concert, Carnegie Hall	
2026	Sweeney Todd	Director	University Production, Pace University	

== Awards and nominations ==
Year	Award	Category	Show	Result	Ref
2020	Lucille Lortel Awards	Outstanding Featured Actress in a Musical	A Strange Loop	Nominated	
2020	Obie Award	Special Citation	A Strange Loop	Won	
2022	Tony Award	Best Performance by a Featured Actress in a Musical	A Strange Loop	Nominated	
2022	Drama League Award	Distinguished Performance	A Strange Loop	Nominated	
2024	HRC Visibility Award			Won	
