= The Guest Book =

2017 American anthology comedy TV series

- Genre: Comedy
- Created by: Greg Garcia
- Starring: Charlie Robinson; Carly Jibson; Lou Wilson; Kellie Martin; Eddie Steeples; Kimiko Glenn; Jimmy Tatro; Dan Beirne
- Theme music composer: honeyhoney
- Composer: John E. Low
- Country of origin: United States
- Original language: English
- No. of seasons: 2
- No. of episodes: 20

Production
- Executive producers: Greg Garcia; Alix Jaffe
- Production locations: Los Angeles, California
- Running time: 21 minutes
- Production companies: Amigos de Garcia Productions; Studio T CBS Television Studios; Turner Entertainment Networks

Original release
- Network: TBS
- Release: August 3, 2017 – December 18, 2018

The Guest Book is an American anthology comedy television series created by Greg Garcia. Season 1 stars Charlie Robinson, Carly Jibson, Lou Wilson, and Kellie Martin, while season 2 stars Jibson, Eddie Steeples, Kimiko Glenn, Jimmy Tatro, and Dan Beirne.

The series centers on the lives of the employees of, and visitors to, vacation rental properties: season 1 focuses on the renters of Froggy Cottage in the small mountain town of Mount Trace, while season 2 follows the renters of Barefeet Retreat in the oceanside town of Mabel Beach. The regular cast plays residents in the town(s), while each episode is focused on a different guest star who plays an out-of-town vacationer. Garcia, who based the show on his habit of writing fake guest-book entries while on vacation, wrote all the episodes, and makes brief season-two appearances as street beggar Homeless Jack.

The series premiered on TBS on August 3, 2017. On September 13, 2017, TBS renewed it for a second season, which premiered on October 23, 2018. Garcia tweeted on September 12, 2019 that TBS had cancelled the series.

== Cast and characters ==
=== Main ===
- Charlie Robinson as Wilfred (season 1; guest season 2), the caretaker of Froggy Cottage, the mountain rental.
- Carly Jibson as Vivian “Tickles” Williams, the owner of Chubby's, the local strip club near Froggy Cottage. In season 2, she is a waitress at Emmy Lou's Grill, the restaurant near Barefeet Retreat, the beach rental.
- Lou Wilson as Frank (season 1; guest season 2), Vivian's stepson.
- Kellie Martin as Officer Kimberly Leahy (season 1; guest season 2)
- Eddie Steeples as Eddie (season 2; recurring season 1), Wilfred and Emma's nephew.
- Kimiko Glenn as Nikki (season 2), Tommy’s fiancée, a waitress at Emmy Lou's Grill.
- Jimmy Tatro as Bodhi (season 2), Eddie's friend, target of Vivian's lustful desires.
- Dan Beirne as Tommy (season 2), manager at Emmy Lou's Grill and caretaker of his mother's beach rental, Barefeet Retreat.

=== Recurring ===
- Aloma Wright as Emma (season 1; guest season 2), Wilfred's wife.
- Garret Dillahunt as Dr. Andrew Brown.
- Laura Bell Bundy as Jessica, Andrew's ex-wife.
- Trace Garcia as Bryce, Andrew and Jessica's son.
- Margo Martindale as Alice, Kimberly's mother.
- Arjay Smith as Arlo (season 1), a fan of the show, seen only in cold open summarizing the previous week's episode to coworker Woody to entice him to watch the series.
- John Milhiser as Woody (season 1), Arlo's coworker, who never gets around to watching the series.
- Tipper Newton as Sinnomin (season 1; guest season 2), Vivian's employee.
- Melanie Mosley as Kombucha, Vivian's employee.
- Jack Donner as Walter, an elderly Chubby's patron.
- honeyhoney as Chubby's house band, a mailwoman (Suzanne Santo) and an exterminator (Benjamin Jaffe). In season 2, they relocate to Mabel Beach, take jobs as a food-cart lady and a lifeguard, and play at Emmy Lou's Grill.

== Episodes ==
Season	Episodes	Originally released	
Season	Episodes	First released	Last released
1	10	August 3, 2017	September 28, 2017
2	10	October 23, 2018	December 18, 2018

The intended fifth episode of the series was originally intended to air on August 24, 2017, but was held back as it "contained elements that were deemed too sensitive" at that point in time. At the end of August 2017, Garcia noted on Twitter that the held episode would not be made available "for awhile", and that he hopes that it will be released at a later date. In mid-September, Garcia again posted on Twitter and confirmed that the episode would air the next Thursday as the eighth episode of the season, albeit in an edited form to fit its new place in the show's continuity.

When the episode aired, the sensitive elements were revealed to be in relation to the Unite the Right rally which took place two weeks before the episode was originally due to air. The episode depicted an Alzheimer's patient regaining his spousal abuse tendencies and racist personality - going as far as sewing and wearing a KKK outfit with the intention of attending a rally, while also revealing he once murdered an African American while burning down a local black church.

=== Season 1 (2017) ===
No. overall	No. in season	Title	Directed by	Written by	Original release date	U.S. viewers (millions)
1	1	"Story One"	Michael Fresco	Greg Garcia	August 3, 2017	1.33
Tim and Sandy travel to the cottage wanting to spice up their relationship. After feeling pressure from Sandy, who is upset at the lack of creature comforts available to her, Tim visits a local strip club owned by Vivian and is unaware that her stepson Frank is filming the encounter. Frank shows Tim the tape and demands money in exchange for keeping his secret. Tim knocks Frank out and locks him in his car. The next day Tim throws Franks car keys onto the side of the road as he and Sandy depart. Guest stars: Danny Pudi and Lauren Lapkus
2	2	"Story Two"	Michael Fresco	Greg Garcia	August 3, 2017	0.97
Jill and her husband decide to drug their son Ethan's atheist fiancee Lynn at the cottage to perform a baptism. The next day Lynn awakens to discover that her leg has become infected and learns she might lose it. After a short hospital stay she makes a full recovery and accepts the possibility of God. Jill abandons her faith as she believes her prayers went unanswered. Guest stars: Stockard Channing, Henry Zebrowski and Mary Lynn Rajskub
3	3	"Story Three"	Eyal Gordin	Greg Garcia	August 10, 2017	1.21
Phyllis escapes her uncomfortable stay at the cottage with her husband and his boss and the boss' new too-young wife by deciding to help a woman leave her polygamous relationship. She allows the woman to stay in her husband's boss's truck, but the next morning discovers it has been stolen. After they depart, the woman calls the cottage to tell Phyllis that she had borrowed the truck to return to her husband, but has accidentally driven it into a lake. Guest stars: Michaela Watkins, David Zayas, Desmin Borges, Stephnie Weir and Mikaela Hoover
4	4	"Story Four"	Samir Rehem	Greg Garcia	August 17, 2017	1.08
Christy visits the cottage with her boyfriend Paul and his 8-year old daughter. After becoming apprehensive about her relationship, Christy eats a pot brownie and spends her "high" inside a crawlspace writing in the guest book. Paul reports Christy missing and discovers that she used to be a pornographic actress. Ashamed of her past, Christy reconciles with Paul and becomes a mother figure to his daughter. Guest stars: Jaime Pressly, John Ortiz and John Hennigan
5	5	"Story Five"	Samir Rahem	Greg Garcia	August 24, 2017	1.10
Federal Agent Trina brings witness Blake to Froggy Cottage to hide him from his ex-girlfriends's drug-cartel connections. Blake attempts to escape only to discover that he and Trina share a love of poetry and they decide to run away together. Blake later ditches Trina, but she tracks him down at a Mexican cantina. Guest stars: Kimberly Hebert Gregory and Tommy Dewey
6	6	"Story Six"	Michael Engler	Greg Garcia	August 31, 2017	1.16
Nerdy, obsessive-compulsive, middle-aged Adam has a crush on his younger co-worker Gillian, and creates a fake party invite to entice her to the cottage. It backfires when she brings another co-worker, Theo, with her and Adam must then invite the townspeople to his party. Despite having a good time at the party, Adam has an allergic reaction to peanuts and also overhears Gillian and Theo confessing their feelings for each other. As the party ends, a stranger who received the fake party invite by accident arrives, but Adam finds her obsessive-compulsiveness weird and shuts the door in her face. Guest stars: Michael Rapaport and Kate Micucci
7	7	"Story Seven"	Eyal Gordin	Greg Garcia	September 7, 2017	0.98
Tommy wants his girlfriend Marla to do two things: 1) finally accept his marriage proposal and 2) get off crystal meth. He takes Marla to the mountains for a vacation, hoping it'll give her a chance to break her meth habit. They break into the currently-vacant Froggy Cottage, where Tommy flushes Marla's meth down the toilet. While they are fighting, a bear breaks into the cottage. After surviving the bear's invasion, Marla agrees she doesn't need the crystal meth and asks Tommy to marry her. Guest stars: Andrew J. West and Shannon Woodward
8	8	"Story Eight"	Michael Engler	Greg Garcia	September 14, 2017	1.14
Medical researcher Laurie brings Alzheimer's patient Edgar to study the effects of an alternative therapy involving recreating a patient's past life. Edgar responds well by reliving several memories that reveal him as a white-supremacist supporter of KKK. He mistakes Laurie for his wife and treats her misogynistically, and he is nasty to the black male nurse who accompanies them to the cottage. Laurie and the nurse discover that Edgar caused an unsolved arson from the 1950s that killed the same handyman, based on the fact that Edgar is planning to set the same church on fire that night. Guest stars: Jenna Fischer, Orson Bean and Affion Crockett
9	9	"Story Nine"	Greg Garcia	Greg Garcia	September 21, 2017	0.98
Amish boy Jacob goes on a tour for his Rumspringa. After watching 8 Mile he becomes infatuated with Brittany Murphy. He arrives at the mountain town and rents Froggy Cottage to meet with God. Not finding Him there, he spins his revolver to find answers and concludes that he should commit suicide to find God. As the revolver wasn't loaded, he attempts various modes of suicide before breaking his leg and being taken to the hospital. While recovering, Jacob watches The Brady Bunch, falls in love with Marcia Brady, and heads to California where he meets Maureen McCormick. Guest stars: Sebastian Schier, Aylam Orian, and Maureen McCormick
10	10	"Story Ten"	Greg Garcia	Greg Garcia	September 28, 2017	1.16
Strip-club owner Vivian was shot with an arrow in her breast while trying to kill Froggy Cottage caretaker Wilfred as revenge for destroying the tape she used to blackmail him. Wilfred ties Vivian to a chair while Dr. Andrew returns with supplies from the hospital. When Andrew tries to talk to Vivian, she bites him and Wilfred sedates her. When she wakes up she tries to draw attention to Froggy Cottage while Andrew is at the strip club talking to Frank and Wilfred is with his wife. A suspicious Officer Kimberly investigates and discovers Wilfred trying to hide Vivian in the closet, and is upset she must arrest Andrew. However, Andrew's son chances upon Tim's story from Story One in the guest book and Kimberly contacts Tim to ask him to testify against Vivian for blackmailing him. Note: numerous guests who stayed at Froggy Cabin throughout the season are seen in flashbacks

=== Season 2 (2018) ===
No. overall	No. in season	Title	Directed by	Written by	Original release date	U.S. viewers (millions)
11	1	"Finding Reality"	Greg Garcia	Greg Garcia	October 23, 2018	0.98
A couple rents a beach house to work on their marriage, but the husband's obsession with virtual reality gets in the way and ultimately betrays him. Guest Stars: Nat Faxon and Kether Donohue
12	2	"Under Cover"	Greg Garcia	Greg Garcia	October 23, 2018	0.69
A couple who rents the beach house to help an addict reach her rock bottom helps someone else in the process. Guest Stars: Will Arnett and Martha Plimpton
13	3	"Counting Problems"	Rebecca Asher	Greg Garcia	October 30, 2018	0.87
A compulsive counter comes to the beach house to admit a secret to his family, but when they cancel, he finds a makeshift family to admit his secret to, only for his real family to arrive. Guest star: Michael Rapaport, reprising his role from season 1, episode 6
14	4	"Killer Party"	Greg Garcia	Greg Garcia	November 6, 2018	0.95
A man returns to the beach house to reminisce about a party he held there the year before, where an unexpected party crasher ended up leaving a lasting impression. Guest stars: Michael Cassidy, Paul Dooley, and Darrell Britt-Gibson
15	5	"Two Steps Forward, One Step Back"	Samir Rehem	Greg Garcia	November 13, 2018	0.86
A man rents the beach house for his family and it costs more than he expects. Guest stars: Steve Zissis and Allison Tolman
16	6	"Invisible Son"	Greg Garcia	Greg Garcia	November 20, 2018	1.02
A loner's family invites him to the beach house for a weekend and asks a stripper to pretend to be his girlfriend. He neglects to tell her that they are reality TV stars--and they are not really his family. Guest stars: Pete Davidson, Lisa Rinna, Tipper Newton, Izzy Diaz, Matthew Willig, and Lexi Ainsworth
17	7	"Tonight You Become a Man"	Samir Rehem	Greg Garcia	November 27, 2018	1.00
When parents leave their son alone for the first time in the beach house while they attend a concert, he has his own adventures and learns what it means to be a grownup. Guest stars: Antonio Raul Corbo, Nadine Velazquez, and Steve Talley
18	8	"Let Me Put You on a Brief Hold"	Rebecca Asher	Greg Garcia	December 4, 2018	0.85
The beach house is rented to a man whose phone is not working. He calls technical support and remains on hold as the representative deals with life-or-death issues only to learn a lesson. Guest stars: Jon Bass, Adhir Kalyan, Meera Rohit Kumbhani, and Paull Walia
19	9	"Everybody Loves Clark"	Greg Garcia	Greg Garcia	December 11, 2018	0.91
The beach-house owner surprises his fiancee with a wedding; old friends visit looking for Eddie; Vivian and Bodhi have a lot more in common than they realized. Note: Officer Kimberly, Wilfred, Emma, and Frank, joined by Dr. Andrew (on a video call), main characters from Season 1, visit Vivian and Eddie
20	10	"Someplace Other Than Here"	Greg Garcia	Greg Garcia	December 18, 2018	0.93
A man works up the courage to pull the nuclear option on his marriage only for fate to get in the way and sets him on a new path. Guest Stars: Oliver Hudson, Kerri Kenney-Silver, Matt Walsh, and Michael K. Williams

== Reception ==
=== Critical response ===
On the review aggregator website Rotten Tomatoes, the series has an approval rating of 64% based on 11 reviews, with an average rating of 6.33 out of 10. The site's critical consensus reads, "An outstanding cast and sporadically sharp humor make The Guest Book worth checking out, even if its anthology formula leads to a bumpy journey from episode to episode." Metacritic, which uses a weighted average, assigned a score of 55 out of 100 based on 9 reviews.

=== Ratings ===
Viewership and ratings per season of The Guest Book
Season	Timeslot (ET)	Episodes	First aired		Last aired		Avg. viewers (millions)	18–49 rank	Avg. 18–49 rating
Season	Timeslot (ET)	Episodes	Date	Viewers (millions)	Date	Viewers (millions)	Avg. viewers (millions)	18–49 rank	Avg. 18–49 rating
1	Thursday 10:30 pm	10	August 3, 2017	1.33	September 28, 2017	1.16	1.11	TBD	0.39
2	Tuesday 10:30 pm	10	October 23, 2018	0.98	December 18, 2018	0.93	0.91	TBD	0.30
