= Randy Blair =

American writer and actor

Randy Blair is an American actor and writer, best known for originating the role of Hipolito/Elton John in the Broadway musical Amelie.

== Writing career ==
His work as a bookwriter and lyricist includes Gigantic (Vineyard Theatre), Perez Hilton Saves the Universe (or at least the greater Los Angeles area): the Musical! (Barrow Street Theatre), Spidermusical (Mint Theatre), Haute Mess (Ars Nova), #RUFF (serials at (The Flea Theatre)), and Leslie Kritzer's Beautiful Disaster at Joe's Pub. He has also served as a creative consultant writer on Funny Or Die's Billy on the Street.

His play Mrs. Lowenstein was adapted into a five-part limited series podcast starring Ann Dowd.

== Acting career ==
As an actor, Blair originated the role of Hipolito/Elton John in the world premiere of Amelie at Berkeley Repertory Theatre, and continued with the production to the Ahmanson Theatre in Los Angeles and the Walter Kerr Theatre on Broadway. Other off-Broadway world premieres include the OBIE-winning Adding Machine, directed by David Cromer; The Black Crook at Abrons Arts Center; The Yellow Wood, directed by BD Wong; and the original developmental productions of Chaplin. Regional theatre affiliations include Berkeley Rep, The Repertory Theatre of St. Louis, Woolly Mammoth Theatre Company, Alabama Shakespeare Festival, and Weston Playhouse.

Blair's television work includes Naked Brothers Band, Viralcom, Law & Order, Strangers with Candy. He also performed in the film Afterwards.
