= Spamilton =

Musical parody play

- An American Parody
- Broadway promotional poster
- Music: Various
- Lyrics: Gerard Alessandrini
- Book: Gerard Alessandrini
- Basis: Hamilton by Lin-Manuel Miranda
- Premiere: July 19, 2016: Triad Theatre, New York City
- Productions: 2016 Off-Broadway; 2017 Chicago; 2017 Culver City; 2018 Off-West End

Spamilton: An American Parody is a musical parody of the Broadway show Hamilton. Written by Gerard Alessandrini, creator of the parody revue Forbidden Broadway, Spamilton also parodies several other musicals, including Gypsy, Chicago, The King and I, Assassins, Camelot, The Book of Mormon and Sweeney Todd, and personalities, like Patti LuPone, Audra McDonald, Stephen Sondheim, Stephen Schwartz, Barbra Streisand, Bernadette Peters, Carol Channing and Liza Minnelli.

The show, directed by Alessandrini, had its first preview on July 19, 2016, and opened on September 8, 2016, at New York's Triad Theatre. Originally scheduled to run 18 performances, it was extended at the Triad until May 28, 2017. It moved on June 2, 2017, to the 47th Street Theatre, near the Richard Rodgers Theatre where Hamilton is presented. The production ran into 2018.

A Chicago production of Spamilton opened at the Royal George Theatre on March 12, 2017. A production ran at the Kirk Douglas Theatre in Culver City from November 5, 2017, to January 7, 2018, shortly before a national tour. US tours continued into 2024.

A production played in London at the Menier Chocolate Factory running from July 24 (previews from July 12) to September 15, 2018.

== Synopsis ==
The musical opens with a parody of the opening number of Hamilton. Leslie Odom Jr., Daveed Diggs, Okieriete Onaodowan and Renée Elise Goldsberry sing about their main star, a man named 'Lin-Manuel as Hamilton', and his quest to save Broadway with his brand new musical, unaware it will one day be parodied. ("Lin-Manuel as Hamilton")

The show cuts to New York City, 2014. Lin-Manuel meets Leslie Odom Jr., and asks if he is Aaron Burr, saying "Now that I've cast you...". Leslie gives Lin-Manuel advice on making his musical in a send up of the Hamilton song, Aaron Burr, Sir ("Aaron Burr, Sir, Nervous-Er") to which Lin-Manuel gets upset and claims he isn't going to let Broadway rot, discussing his plans on how his new musical will breathe life into the dead and cash-grabbing modern Broadway business. He meets Daveed Diggs and Okieriete Onaodowan, and he recruits them for his show, and Leslie tells them they're "rocking the boat!", though they keep getting sidetracked due to things like doing pot and being scared of the song "Memory" from Cats ("His Shot")

A transition occurs to the modern Broadway scene. We meet Renée Elise Goldsberry, Phillipa Soo and Jasmine Cephas Jones, (though Phillipa and Jasmine are just puppets being controlled by Renée), lamenting over the runied state of entertainment, saying all shows are yucky as they mash up right now, including such productions like An American Psycho in Paris, The Lion King & I, and Avenue Crucible. ("Look Around (The Schuyler Puppets)")

Lin-Manuel as Hamilton, now bearing the iconic Hamilton coat, states he has a dream and claims his quest is to get his show mainstream, a historical epic similar to Camalot. He works on names for his show, going from 'Camalot', 'Spamalot', 'Spamilton', and after an accidental lightbulb given to him by Okieriete, 'Hamilton', calling it the 'impossible show!' (Lin-Manuel's Quest)

He is interruped by a woman begging for tickets to Hamilton, so we can assume that a time-skip has occurred and Hamilton is currently being previewed. Lin-Manuel gives her tickets, but she rejects them, saying they aren't ever-lasting. Lin-Manuel asks if he knows her, and she reveals she is Bernadette Peters, to which Lin-Manuel exclaims 'Bernadette Peters!' ("Ticket-Beggar Woman"). Leslie tells Lin-Manuel not to worry, she's just a washed up actor, claiming Broadway is full of them. This transitions to a winter prom, where Lin-Manuel, Leslie, Daveed and Okieriete try their luck with the ladies ("Straight Guy's Winter Prom"), but this is interrupted by a message from King George, who berates musical theatre for once being too gay, but now with Hamilton straightness has returned to theatre ("Straight Is Back").

The show parodies the numerous time transitions in Hamilton, repeating 1789 until it turns to nonsense. Leslie wonders how the audience keeps up with the thick plot of Hamilton, finding out Daveed Diggs has been double cast as Lafeyette and Jefferson, and Daveed has the same questions as him, and he tries to help the audience catch up ("What Did You Miss?").

Lin-Manuel composes some fan-mail to his idol, Stephen Sondheim, asking for help on how to make his show better. This causes Sondheim to take the form of Ben Franklin to talk to Lin-Manuel, telling him his musical is messy and claiming he is a one-hit wonder. Franklin warns him to keep his raps and lyrics simple, or else the audience will get confused and won't listen. Renée agrees, and recounts the time she sang a song by Sondheim, remembering how hard it was ("Ben Franklin, Stephen Sondheim & Lin Manuel")

Hard cut to Daveed Diggs in some 80s styled attire, and Daveed recounts his life to the beat of intro music to The Fresh Prince of Bel-Air, and shifts to singing about trying to rap as Lafeyette and Jefferson ("Daveed Diggs - The Fresh Prince of Big Hair"), to which Renée decides to rap battle him, but Lin-Manuel hijacks the song and sings about himself and, again, his show ("Rap Battle").

Suddenly, the ticket-beggar returns in flashier attire, again begging for Hamilton tickets. Lin-Manuel gives her tickets, but she declines them, saying they are for something rotten, to which Lin-Manuel retorts they are for School of Rock ("Ticket-Beggar Woman #2") The woman is revealed to be Liza Minnelli, who seems to be against the song-writing style of Lin-Manuel ("Liza's Down With Rap")

Once again, a ticket-beggar appears, who turns out to be a woman named Audra McDonald, a has-been. Lin-Manuel condemns Audra and hops off, leaving Audra and Brian Stokes Mitchell to plot a new musical about Roosevelt (Whichever one is not stated), to compete with Hamilton. ("Ticket-Beggar Woman #3")

Lin-Manuel returns to home, and jokingly laments over his fame and fortune, seeing his home town turned to a Lin-Manuel Miranda worshipping compound, selling souvenirs and gifts uptown, going as far as calling him a god and news reports grovelling for interviews. ("In The Hype"). Leslie asks why and how Lin-Manuel does what he does, and Lin-Manuel claims he just tries to write like it's going out of style.

Much to Lin-Manuel's shock, J-Lo appears, and inflates Lin-Manuels ego, eventually asking to team up and work together. Lin-Manuel declines, and Beyoncé and Gloria Estefan appears and offers him the same option ("Lin-Manuel & J-Lo, Beyoncé & Gloria Estefan")

The show turns to a Book of Mormon parody, as multiple former Broadway shows beg for attention pitifully, unable to compete with Lin-Manuel as Hamilton's smash hit, before admitting defeat ("Book of No More Mormons"). Some shows don't though. The specific ones being Assassins, The Phantom of The Opera, Aladdin, Cats, and Wicked, all itching to get back to Broadway ("Broadway Assassins")

Leslie Odom Jr. tells Lin-Manuel to stop rapping so much, pushing Lin-Manuel over the edge. Leslie challenges him to a duel, and Lin-Manuel agrees. Leslie tries to debate that Broadway is already dead and his dreams are moot, to which Lin-Manuel debates with a bullet, shooting Leslie. Leslie shoots as well, and both get wounded ("Cool Duel"). Renée gets sad over this, leading to a number where she tries to make the audience cry, telling them how all these characters die, but also tries to list all her good deeds. In a last-ditch effort, she tells them she opened an orphanage ("Who Lives, Who Dies, Who Cries")

One of Renée's orphans, who bears a striking resemblance to Little Orphan Annie, tells the audience that Hamilton is killing it on Broadway, to which Lin-Manuel agrees. In New York City, Lin-Manuel and his cast get rich off the success ("Lin-Manuel's New York City")

The show cuts to the Tony award for Best Musical of The Century, with Hamilton being nominated. Barbra Streisand, who is presenting the award, stops before announcing the winner, and asks Lin-Manuel if she can make the movie adaptation of Hamilton, should it happen, wanting full creative control. The rest of the cast comes back and agrees they want a film version, suggesting Johnny Depp as Hamilton, Russell Crowe as Aaron Burr, Shia LaBeouf as Jefferson and have Steven Spielberg directing, even though they all agree the movie will not match up to the musical. ("The Film When It Happens")

The show ends in a bar with the cast of Hamilton, celebrating the success of Hamilton, commercially and critically, all being happy that Broadway has been salvaged. The show ends with Lin-Manuel telling the audience to write their own musical ("Finale: Raise a Glass to Broadway")

== Musical numbers ==
- "Lin-Manuel as Hamilton"
- "Aaron Burr, Sir, Nervous-er"
- "His Shot"
- "Look Around (The Schuyler Puppets)"
- "Lin-Manuel's Quest"
- "Ticket Beggar Woman"
- "Straight Guy's Winter's Prom"
- "Straight is Back"
- "What Did You Miss?"
- "Ben Franklin, Sondheim & Lin-Manuel"
- "Daveed Diggs - The Fresh Prince of Big Hair"
- "Rap Battle"
- "Ticket Beggar Woman #2"
- "Liza's 'Down With Rap'"
- "Ticket Beggar Woman #3"
- "One Big Song" (Written for Los Angeles production)
- "In the Hype"
- "Lin-Manuel & J-Lo, Beyoncé & Gloria Estefan"
- "Book of No More Mormons"
- "Broadway Assassins"
- "Cool Duel"
- "Who Lives, Who Dies, Who Cries"
- "Lin-Manuel's New York City"
- "The Film When It Happens"
- "Finale: Raise a Glass to Broadway"
- "Encore: Our Shot"

=== Recordings ===
The original off-Broadway cast recording for Spamilton was released March 3, 2017 by DRG Records.

== Original casts ==
Character	Original Off-Broadway Cast	Original Chicago Cast	Original L.A. Cast	Original London Cast	Original Pittsburgh Cast
Lin-Manuel Miranda / Alexander Hamilton	Dan Rosales	Yando Lopez	William Cooper Howell	Liam Tamne	T.J. Newton
Leslie Odom Jr. / Aaron Burr	Chris Anthony Giles	Eric Andrew Lewis	Wilkie Ferguson III	Eddie Elliott	Tru Verret-Fleming
Renée Elise Goldsberry / Angelica Schuyler / Phillipa Soo / Eliza Schuyler Hamilton / Jasmine Cephas Jones / Peggy Schuyler / Audra McDonald / Jennifer Lopez / Beyoncé / Gloria Estefan	Nora Schell	Michelle Lauto	Zakiya Young	Julie Yammanee	Erin Riley Ramirez
Bernadette Peters / Barbra Streisand / Carol Channing / Liza Minnelli / Patti LuPone	Christine Pedi	Christine Pedi	Susanne Blakeslee	Sophie-Louise Dann	
King George	Glenn Bassett	Adam LaSalle		Damian Humbley	Nick Stamatakis
Daveed Diggs / Marquis de Lafayette / Thomas Jefferson	Nicholas Edwards	Donterrio Johnson	John Devereaux	Jason Denton	LaTrea Rembert
Ben Franklin / Sondheim / George Washington	Juwan Crawley	David Robbins	Dedrick A. Bonner	Marc Akinfolarin	Justin Lonesome
Offstage Covers	Cameron Amandus & Claudia Yanez	Chuckie Benson & Ariel Richardson	Becca Brown* & Elijah Reyes	James Hameed & Esme Laudat	Austin Rivers & Jess Val Ortiz
Onstage Pianist/Musical Director	Fred Barton	Adam LaSalle	James Lent	Simon Beck	Nick Stamatakis
Casting Director	Michael Cassara, CSA	Michael Cassara, CSA	Andrew Lynford		Michael Cassara, CSA

The show has the most racially diverse cast of any of Alessandrini's productions.

== Critical response ==
Spamilton received positive reviews from critics. In his review of the Off-Broadway production, Ben Brantley in The New York Times called it a "smart, silly and often convulsively funny thesis, performed by a motor-mouthed cast that is fluent in many tongues". Frank Scheck, in his review of the Off-Broadway production for The Hollywood Reporter, wrote the musical "is so infectiously fun that it could easily run as long as its inspiration."

Marilyn Stasio in reviewing the Off-Broadway production in Variety, wrote, "Like the original show, the pants are tight, the boots are shiny, the bosoms are uplifting and the vests show just enough chest to look manly. Switch-hitting as director/choreographer, Alessandrini assigns his performers signature moves that make each character look authentic, if ever-so-slightly goofy. Getting those physical details right lays the groundwork for the witty character impersonations to come."

Hamilton creator Lin-Manuel Miranda and director Thomas Kail both attended a performance. Miranda praised the parody, saying, "I laughed my brains out."

== Awards ==
Year	Award	Category	Nominee	Result
2017	Drama League Awards	Distinguished Performance	Nora Schell	Nominated
2017	Off-Broadway Alliance Awards	Best Unique Theatrical Experience		Won
2017	Drama Desk Award	Outstanding Lyrics	Gerard Alessandrini	Nominated
2017	Drama Desk Award	Outstanding Featured Actress in a Musical	Nora Schell	Nominated
2017	Outer Critics Circle Awards	Outstanding New Off-Broadway Musical		Nominated
2017	Theater Fans' Choice Awards	Best Off-Broadway Musical		Nominated
