= Carly Jibson =

American actress, singer and writer (born 1984)

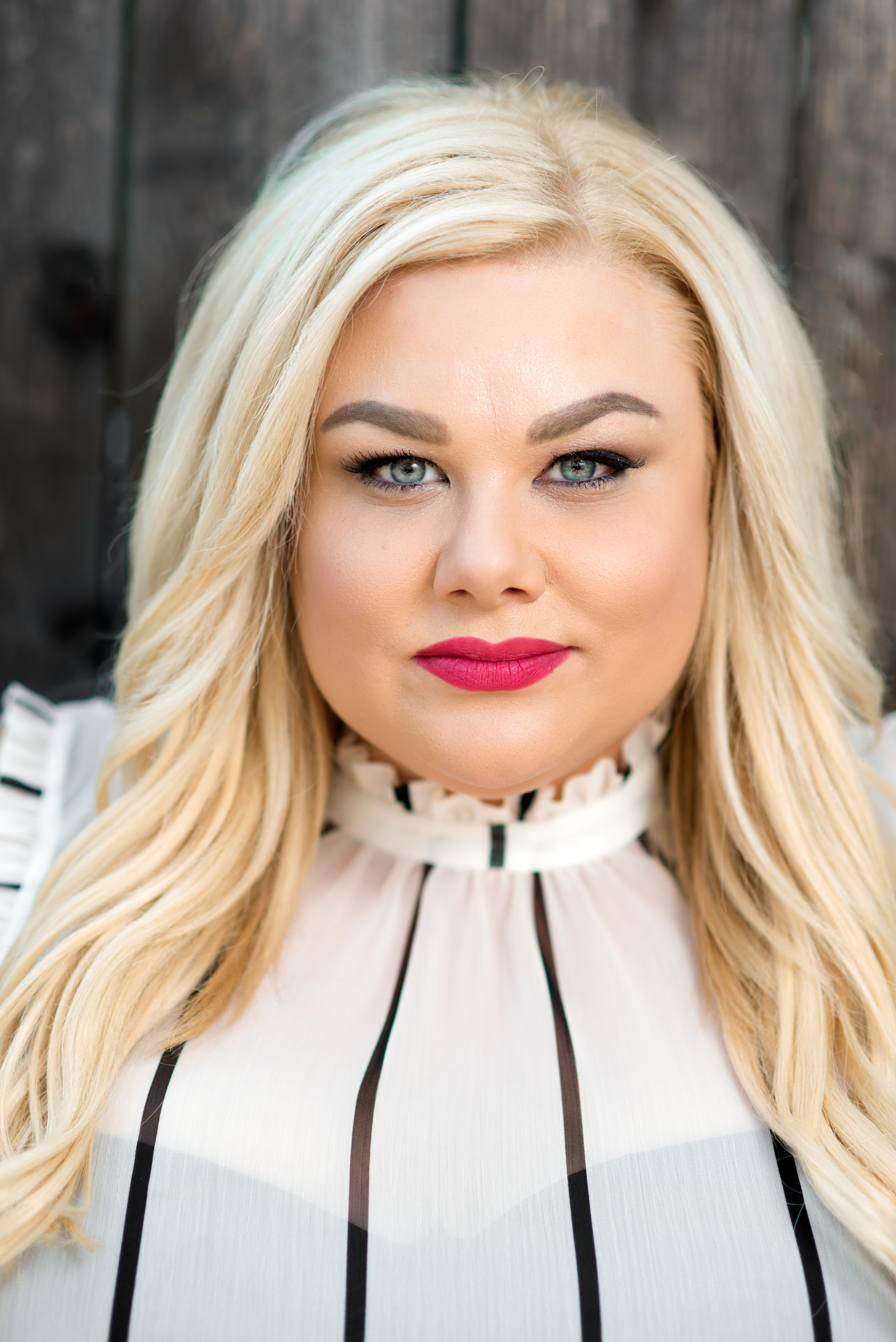
- Jibson in 2017
- Born: 1984 (age 41–42); United States
- Occupations: Actress, singer, writer
- Years active: 2003–present

Carly Jibson (born 1984) is an American actress, singer and writer. She is best known for her role in the Broadway musical Hairspray as Tracy Turnblad. She also starred in the TV series The Guest Book and One Mississippi.

== Life and career ==
Jibson was raised in Michigan. She dropped out of Mona Shores High School in 2002, after which she moved to New York City. She originated the role of Tracy Turnblad in the first national touring production of Hairspray. In 2003–06, she took on the same role in the Broadway production of Hairspray. In 2006, she appeared as Baby Manicotti in Andrew Lippa's Asphalt Beach. In 2008, she originated the role of Pepper Walker in the musical Cry-Baby on Broadway. She released her debut recording, Best of me, in 2011.

In 2017, Jibson was cast as Desiree in the Amazon Video original comedy series One Mississippi and on the TBS comedy seriesThe Guest Book as Vivian. In 2023, she was cast as Cindy in Netflix's Holiday in the Vineyards.

== Filmography ==
=== Theatre ===
Year	Show	Role	Notes
2003-2005	Hairspray	Tracy Turnblad	
2006-2007	Asphalt Beach	Baby Manicotti	
2008	Cry-Baby	Pepper Walker	
2009	Fat Camp (musical)	Daphne Daluca	
2010	Johnny Baseball	Patty	
2011-2012	Fat Camp (Off Broadway)	Daphne Daluca	
2014	Scream (musical)	Narrator	

=== Television ===
Year	Title	Role	Notes
2014	Los Feliz, 90027	Diamond Delano	1 Episode
2017	One Mississippi	Desiree	5 Episodes
2017-2018	The Guest Book	Vivian	19 Episodes
2019	Atypical	Josie	1 Episode
2020	The Funny Dance Show	Herself	1 Episode

== Discography ==
- Dreaming Wide Awake (2007)
- Best of Me (2011)
- Cry Baby (2015)
