= Richmond Triangle Players =

Theatre company in Richmond, Virginia

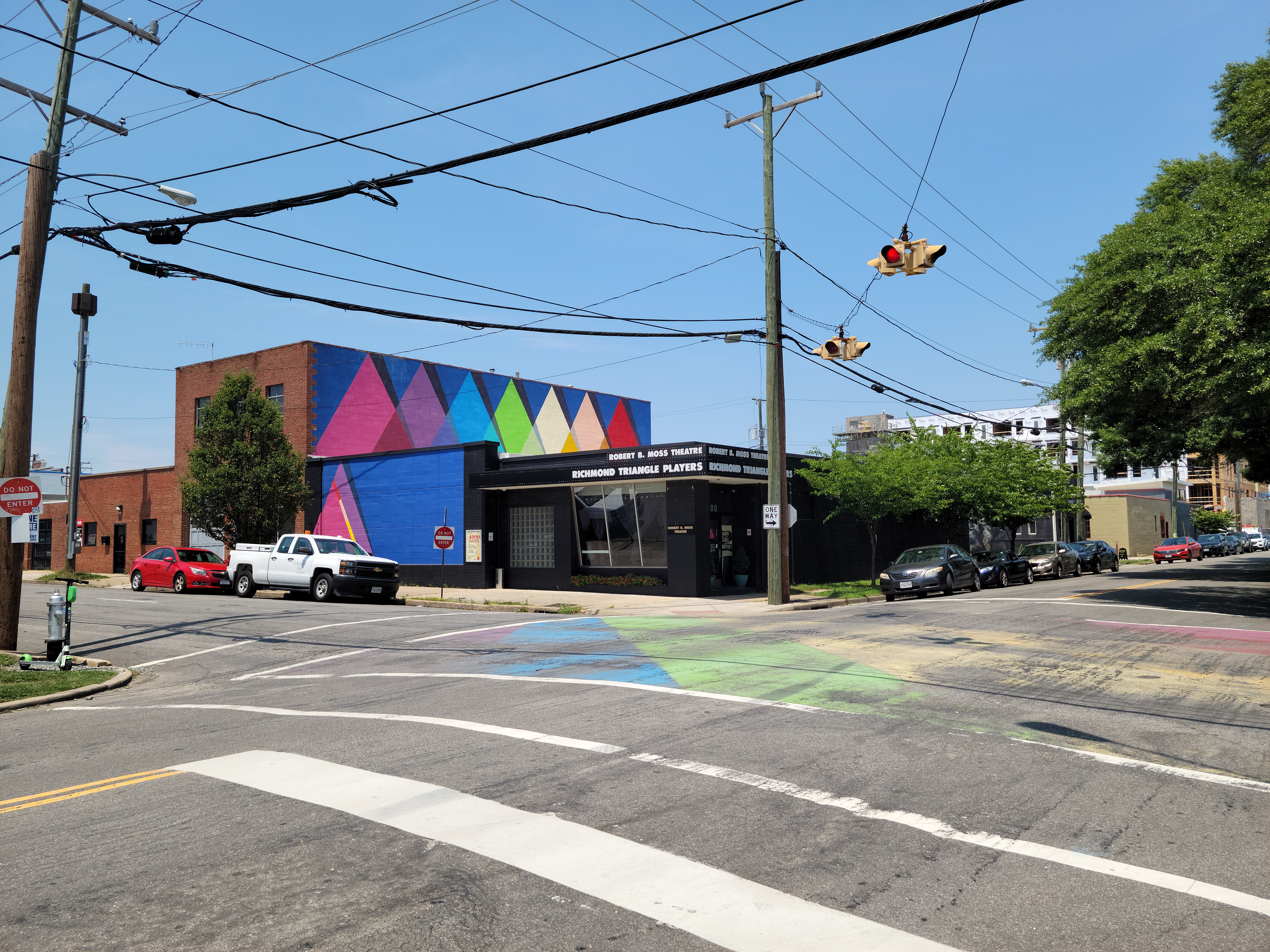
- RTP's Robert B. Moss Theatre in the Scott's Addition neighborhood of Richmond, 2021
- Formation: 1993
- Type: Theatre group
- Location: Richmond, Virginia, U.S.
- Coordinates: 37°33′55″N 77°28′19″W
- Artistic director: Lucian Restivo
- Website: rtriangle.org

Richmond Triangle Players (RTP) is a nonprofit, professional theatre company located in Richmond, Virginia that produces programming rooted in queer experiences and supports the development of queer artistry.

It is the only professional theatre company in Central Virginia and the longest continually operating theatre in the Mid-Atlantic region which serves the LGBTQ+ community.

== History ==
The company originated from a benefit performance in 1992, where they performed a trio of one-act-plays by Harvey Fierstein. In the following year the Richmond Triangle Players launched its first season with four plays. For the first fifteen years the company was located at the Fieldens Cabaret Theatre and in 2010 the organization opened the Robert B. Moss Theatre, a 90-seat theater located in the Scott’s Addition neighborhood of Richmond, Virginia.

In 2014 Richmond Triangle Players partnered with artists from the local TheatreLAB to create Spectrum, a theatre arts education program for LGBTQ+ youth and allies in grades 8-12.

Notable productions have included The Laramie Project and A Chorus Line.

== So.Queer Playwrighting Festival ==
In 2020 the Richmond Triangle Players launched the So.Queer Playwriting Festival, a biennial festival of LGBTQ+ works by a selected playwright. The company collaborates with the playwright through a series of salon readings, staged readings, and minimalized productions, as well as consultations with local artists, mentorship from theatre professionals, and the provision of other creative supports. The idea for the festival came from former Richmond Triangle Players Artistic Director John Knapp and his husband Tom Gillham.

== Awards and recognition ==
Richmond Triangle Players has received praise from local press and has been nominated for several awards. It was nominated for the inaugural People’s Choice Award from the Richmond Theatre Critics Circle and has both praise and awards for its 2018 production of The Laramie Project.

In 2016 Playbill.com named Richmond Triangle Players as "one of the 15 most important theaters of its kind in the nation". Richmond Triangle Players has also been named one of the year’s “OUTstanding Virginians” at the 2018 statewide Equality Virginia dinner and was named a 2019 “Richmond History Maker” by the Valentine Museum and Capital Region Collaborative.

=== Awards ===
- Best Local Theater Company, 1st Place, Best of Richmond, Style Weekly 2017
- Best Local Theater Company, 2nd Place, Best of Richmond, Style Weekly 2020
