= Leslie Kritzer =

American actress and singer (born 1977)

Leslie Rodriguez Kritzer
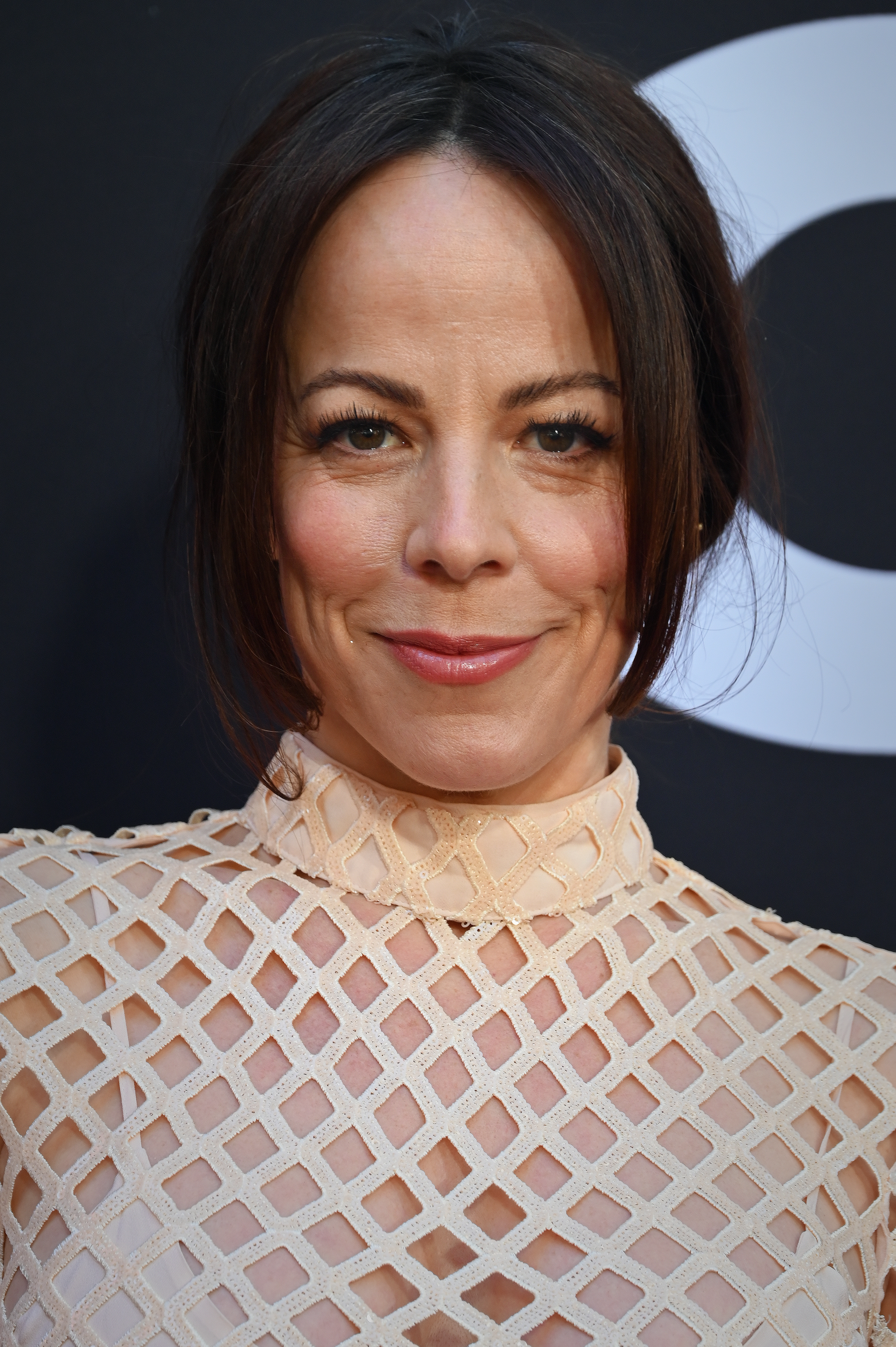
- Kritzer in 2025
- Born: May 24, 1977 (age 49); New York City, New York, U.S.
- Education: University of Cincinnati (BFA)
- Occupations: Actress, singer
- Years active: 1999–present
- Spouse: Vadim Feichtner (m. 2013; div. 2026)

Leslie Rodriguez Kritzer (born May 24, 1977) is an American musical theatre actress and singer. She was nominated for a Tony Award for Best Featured Actress in a Musical for her performance in the Broadway revival of Spamalot. Since 2024, she has voiced Rosie in the adult animated musical series Hazbin Hotel.

== Life and career ==
Leslie Rodriguez Kritzer was born in Manhattan and raised in Livingston, New Jersey. Her father is Jewish, and her mother is of Puerto Rican ancestry. Kritzer was raised Catholic. She attended Livingston High School, graduating in 1995. A 1999 graduate of the University of Cincinnati – College-Conservatory of Music, she has appeared on Broadway in Hairspray as Shelly and in Legally Blonde as Serena. Off-Broadway she appeared in The Great American Trailer Park Musical, Bat Boy, and Godspell, and her regional credits include Vanities (Kathy), Babes in Arms (Baby Rose), and both Grease (Rizzo) and Funny Girl (Fanny) at Paper Mill Playhouse.

Kritzer starred in Leslie Kritzer is Patti LuPone at Les Mouches, a recreation of Patti LuPone's famed nightclub act. The show premiered at Joe's Pub and was conceived and directed by Ben Rimalower. She received a 2006 Drama Desk nomination for Outstanding Featured Actress in a Musical for The Great American Trailer Park Musical, followed by a 2007 Special Achievement MAC Award for her show Leslie Kritzer Is Patti LuPone at Les Mouches, and a 2007 Clarence Derwent Award for her performance as Serena in Legally Blonde.

Kritzer starred in A Catered Affair, portraying Janey Hurley, the character played by Debbie Reynolds in the 1956 feature film of the same name. A Catered Affair ran on Broadway from March 2008 through July 27, 2008. She starred in the Encores! staged concert presentation of On the Town in November 2008 as Hildy, the amorous and aggressive taxi driver.

In the 2009 New York Musical Theatre Festival, she performed in Judas and Me as the angel Gabriel. In March 2009 Kritzer played Monica in the Off-Broadway musical Rooms: A Rock Romance. In December 2009, she performed in the musical Pop! at the Yale Repertory Theatre. The musical is based on the life of Andy Warhol. Kritzer portrayed Valerie, a character based on Valerie Solanas.

In March 2010, she, along with Tom Wopat, Vanessa L. Williams, and Barbara Cook, starred in a new musical revue, Sondheim on Sondheim. The Roundabout Theatre Company limited engagement production opened on Broadway at Studio 54 on March 19, 2010, in previews and closed June 13, 2010. It was directed by James Lapine who conceived this revue of music by Stephen Sondheim.

In the 2015–16 season, Kritzer starred in two Off-Broadway productions. She starred in the Vineyard Theatre's production of Gigantic, which opened on December 3, 2015. Kritzer then starred as Salome in the 2016 Roundabout Theatre Company production of The Robber Bridegroom, which opened March 13, 2016. For her performance, she was nominated twice for the 2016 Lortel Award for Outstanding Featured Actress in a Musical. She won the award for her performance in The Robber Bridegroom. Kritzer joined the principal cast of Something Rotten! on July 18, 2016, replacing Heidi Blickenstaff as Bea.

She appeared in the new musical The Honeymooners as Alice Kramden. The musical is based on the television show The Honeymooners and premiered at the Paper Mill Playhouse in Milburn, New Jersey, on September 28, 2017. The musical starred Michael McGrath as Ralph Kramden, Michael Mastro as Ed Norton, and Laura Bell Bundy as Trixie Norton and was directed by John Rando. Kritzer had previously appeared in a workshop of the musical in 2014.

Kritzer starred in the musical version of Beetlejuice as Delia Schlimmer and Miss Argentina, which premiered at the National Theatre in Washington, D.C., in October 2018 before transferring to the Winter Garden Theatre on Broadway, beginning previews in March and opening in April. The production closed on March 10, 2020, due to the COVID-19 pandemic. In September 2021 it was announced that Beetlejuice would reopen on Broadway, at the Marquis Theatre, in April 2022. Kritzer returned as Delia.

In 2023, Kritzer played the Lady of the Lake in Spamalot, first at the Kennedy Center in Washington, DC and later that year on Broadway. She was nominated for a Tony for her performance.

Since February 2024, she has voiced Rosie in the adult animated musical series Hazbin Hotel.

Kritzer was cast in Millers in Marriage in 2024.

Kritzer is now publicly announced to originate the role of Millicent Clyde on Broadway in Paddington: The Musical at the Al Hirschfeld Theatre in New York.

== Personal life ==
Kritzer married musical director Vadim Feichtner at New York City Center on February 22, 2013 and divorced in 2026.

== Filmography ==
=== Film and television ===
Year	Title	Role	Notes
2006	3 lbs	Donna	Episode: "Of Two Minds"
2009	The Other Woman	Paramedic #2	
2010	Law & Order: Special Victims Unit	Donna	Episode: "P.C."
2016	Vinyl	Moira Yankovich	2 episodes
2016	Younger	Talia	Episode: "Ladies Who Lust"
2016	Kevin Can Wait	Beth	Episode: "The Power of Positive Drinking"
2017	Difficult People	Lance's Wife	Episode: "Bernie and Blythe"
2021–2022	Bridge and Tunnel	Lana Shore	5 episodes
2021–2022	New Amsterdam	Nurse Giselle	3 episodes
2022	The First Lady	Martha Graham	2 episodes
2023	The Marvelous Mrs. Maisel	Carol Burnett	Episode: "Four Minutes"
2024	Millers in Marriage	Leslie	
2024–2025	Hazbin Hotel	Rosie (voice)	3 episodes

=== Theatre ===
Year	Title	Role	Notes
1999	Dearest Enemy	Performer	Off-Broadway concert – Musicals Tonight!
2000	Godspell	Performer	Off-Broadway – York Theatre
2001	Bat Boy	Swing, Meredith (understudy)	Off-Broadway – Union Square Theatre
2001	Funny Girl	Fanny Brice	Regional – Paper Mill Playhouse
2002	Babes in Arms	Baby Rose	Regional – Goodspeed Opera House
2003	Grease	Rizzo	Regional – Paper Mill Playhouse
2004	Hairspray	Shelly	Broadway – Neil Simon Theatre
2005	The Great American Trailer Park Musical	Pickles	Off-Broadway – Dodger Stages
2006	Vanities	Kathy	Regional – TheatreWorks
2007	Legally Blonde	Serena, Paulette (Emergency Cover)	Broadway – Palace Theatre
2008	A Catered Affair	Janey	Broadway – Walter Kerr Theatre
2008	On the Town	Hildy	Off-Broadway – Encores!
2009	Rooms: A Rock Romance	Monica	Off-Broadway – New World Stages
2009	Cabaret	Sally Bowles	Regional – Sarofim Hall
2009	Pop!	Valerie	Regional – Yale Repertory Theatre
2010	Sondheim on Sondheim	Performer	Broadway – Studio 54
2010	Damn Yankees	Gloria Thorpe	Regional – The Muny
2011	NEWSical the Musical	Performer	Off-Broadway – Theatre Row
2011	Guys and Dolls	Miss Adelaide	Regional – Barrington Stage Company
2012	Closer Than Ever	Performer	Off-Broadway – York Theatre
2012–13	Elf	Jovie	Broadway – Al Hirschfeld Theatre
2013	The Memory Show	Daughter	Off-Broadway – Duke on 42nd Street
2014	Piece of My Heart: The Bert Berns Story	Jessie	Off-Broadway – Pershing Square Signature Center
2015	Gigantic	Sandy	Off-Broadway – Vineyard Theatre
2016	The Robber Bridegroom	Salome	Off-Broadway – Roundabout Theatre Company
2016	Something Rotten!	Bea	Broadway – St. James Theatre
2017	The Honeymooners	Alice	Regional – Paper Mill Playhouse
2018	Beetlejuice	Delia/Miss Argentina	Pre-Broadway Tryout – National Theatre
2019–20	Beetlejuice	Delia/Miss Argentina	Broadway – Winter Garden Theatre
2022–23	Beetlejuice	Delia	Broadway – Marquis Theatre
2023	Spamalot	Lady of the Lake / Guinevere	Regional – Kennedy Center
2023–24	Spamalot	Lady of the Lake / Guinevere	Broadway – St. James Theatre
2024	The Ultimate Improv Show	Herself	Kennedy Center (August 3, 2024)
2026	The Fantasticks	Mildred Huckabee	Broadway – Helen Hayes Theater
2027	Paddington: The Musical	Millicent Clyde	Broadway – Al Hirschfeld Theatre

== Awards and nominations ==
Award	Year	Category	Work	Result	Notes
Tony Awards	2024	Best Featured Actress in a Musical	Spamalot	Nominated	
Drama Desk Awards	2006	Outstanding Featured Actress in a Musical	The Great American Trailer Park Musical	Nominated	
Drama Desk Awards	2008	Outstanding Featured Actress in a Musical	A Catered Affair	Nominated	
Drama Desk Awards	2024	Outstanding Featured Performance in a Musical	Spamalot	Nominated	
Outer Critics Circle Awards	2009	Outstanding Actress in a Musical	A Rock Romance	Nominated	
Outer Critics Circle Awards	2019	Outstanding Featured Actress in a Musical	Beetlejuice	Nominated	
Outer Critics Circle Awards	2024	Outstanding Featured Performer in a Broadway Musical	Spamalot	Nominated	
Drama League Awards	2019	Distinguished Performance	Beetlejuice	Nominated	
Drama League Awards	2024	Distinguished Performance	Spamalot	Nominated	
Astaire Awards	2016	Outstanding Female Dancer in an Off-Broadway Show	The Robber Bridegroom	Nominated	
Astaire Awards	2019	Outstanding Female Dancer in a Broadway Show	Beetlejuice	Nominated	
Imagen Awards	2026	Best Voice-Over Actor	Hazbin Hotel	Nominated	

== See also ==
- List of Puerto Ricans
- History of the Jews in Puerto Rico
