= Quentin Oliver Lee =

American actor (1988–2022)

- Born: January 28, 1988; San Bernardino, California, U.S.
- Died: December 1, 2022 (aged 34)
- Education: Northern Arizona University
- Occupations: Actor; operatic baritone
- Spouse: Angie Lee Graham (m. 2015)
- Children: 1
- Awards: Grammy Award
- Website: www.quentinoliverlee.com

Quentin Oliver Lee (January 28, 1988 – December 1, 2022) was an American stage actor and operatic baritone. He was widely known for his portrayal of the title role in Andrew Lloyd Webber's The Phantom of the Opera. He was part of the team that won the 2021 Grammy Award for Best Opera Recording in The Prince of Broadway and Gershwin's Porgy and Bess.

== Early life and education ==
Lee was born in San Bernardino, California, and relocated to Arizona for university, later moving to New York City after he graduated from Northern Arizona University (NAU) in 2012 where he received a bachelor's degree in vocal performance. While at NAU, Lee taught at the Flagstaff School of Music and was a member of the Cardinal Key Honor Society. He was also a member of Phi Mu Alpha Sinfonia and a soloist and choir member for the Shrine of the Ages choir and performed with them in South Africa, New York's Carnegie Hall, and at many ACDA conferences.

== Career ==
Early roles for the NAU Opera include the title role in Puccini's Gianni Schicchi, Sid in Britten's Albert Herring, and Belcore in Donizetti's L'elisir d'amore.

After moving to New York, he performed in subway stations to make ends meet, often as part of The Opera Collective for Music Under New York. It was there that a casting agent for Gershwin's Porgy and Bess spotted him singing and encouraged him to audition. After a successful audition, he landed the role and went on to perform on Broadway. He performed as Ben in Menotti's The Telephone at the New York Lyric Opera's Summer Festival in 2014.

In 2017, Lee was featured in the Broadway production of Prince of Broadway and appeared in the short film Race, which was directed by Daniel Barnhill. Other roles include Festival of The Lion King in Hong Kong, and Encores!

In 2018, he portrayed the title character in The Phantom of the Opera's national tour in 2018. Regarding transitioning from performing in subways to Broadway, Lee said in an interview: "To go from (singing in the subway) to ... (five years later) standing ovations in the most iconic role in probably Broadway history is humbling… Anytime I think about it, I'm sort of taken aback."

In opera, Lee portrayed Antonio in Mozart's Le nozze di Figaro, Pandolfe in Massenet's Cendrillon, Giuseppe in The Gondoliers, Raimondo in Donizetti's Lucia di Lammermoor, Schaunard in Puccini's La bohème, and Escamillo in Bizet's Carmen for the New York Lyric Opera Theater. He also appeared in I Am Harvey Milk at Avery Fisher Hall.

In 2019, The New York Times called him "excellent" as Kilian, a big-shot townsman in Heartbeat Opera's production of Weber's Der Freischütz at the Baruch Performing Arts Center in Manhattan.

In 2020, during the COVID-19 pandemic, he portrayed Macbeth in Heartbeat Opera's Lady M, an online production based on Verdi's Macbeth alongside Felicia Moore in the title role. Playbill noted that he was known for his "richly resonant baritone voice."

As a concert soloist, Lee performed in Handel's Messiah, Sedona Opera Saloons, the Martin Luther King Jr. Day celebration in Jacksonville Beach, Florida, and at the Romanian Embassy in New York. Additional credited stage works are Caroline, or Change (in 2021) and The Golden Apple.

His final performance was Off-Broadway, in Heather Christian's Oratorio For Living Things in March 2022.

== Personal life ==
Lee was born and raised in San Bernardino, California. He met his future wife, Angie Lee Graham, when they were both living in New York City. They met at the Harlem young single adult ward of The Church of Jesus Christ of Latter-day Saints, which Lee had joined in 2010. They married in August 2015. They had a daughter. The family lived in Utah at the time of his death, where he pursued a second career in UX design.

=== Death ===
Lee died of colon cancer on December 1, 2022. He had been diagnosed with the disease six months before his death. His wife said in a statement: "He was an incredible man, husband, father, son, brother, friend, singer, actor, and disciple of Christ with great faith in his Father in Heaven. To say 'he will be dearly missed' doesn't reflect the scope of the people and communities he has created and touched."

The Phantom of the Opera production team released a statement on his passing, saying: "The Phantom family is saddened to hear of the passing of Quentin Oliver Lee. Quentin brilliantly lead [sic] our North American tour in 2018. Our hearts are with Quentin's family and friends."

== Awards and honors ==
Lee had made it to the final list of Metropolitan Opera National Council Auditions and had received the National Association of Teachers of Singers Artist Award.
