= Jett Galindo =

Filipino mastering engineer (born 1984)

- Born: December 7th 1984; Philippines
- Education: Berklee College of Music
- Occupation: Mastering Engineer
- Organization: Jett Galindo Mastering
- Website: http://jettgalindo.com

Jett Galindo is a Grammy and Latin Grammy award-winning Filipino mastering engineer based in Los Angeles. She has worked on albums for artists including Barbra Streisand, Gaby Moreno, Weezer, Selena Gomez, Neil Young, and Pink Floyd.

== Early life and education ==
Galindo was born in the Philippines and raised by a family of musicians. She holds a degree in psychology from Ateneo de Manila University, and moved to the US because there were no audio degrees in the Philippines at the time. She earned a bachelor's degree in music production and engineering from the Berklee College of Music.

== Career ==
In the Philippines, Galindo applied for a mentorship at Jesuit Communications Foundation recording studios, but was nearly denied the job when the man hired to train her discovered her gender.

Galindo interned at Avatar Studios (now known as the Power Station) in New York in 2012 where she was recording engineer for producer Jerry Barnes. She engineered for artists including Roberta Flack and Nile Rodgers.

In 2013, Galindo relocated to California to work for Doug Sax at the Mastering Lab in Ojai, California as his assistant and mastering engineer, and also learning about vinyl record cutting. At the Mastering Lab, Galindo worked on titles by Pink Floyd, Barbra Streisand, Diana Krall, and Paul McCartney.

Galindo worked alongside mastering engineer Eric Boulanger until Sax died in 2015. Boulanger and Galindo moved to Los Angeles where Boulanger founded the Bakery, a mastering facility based on the Sony Pictures lot. The Bakery is known for vinyl cutting, and has worked on albums by The Carpenters, Green Day, and the soundtrack to La La Land.

In late 2024, Galindo left The Bakery to start her own mastering studio in Los Angeles.
