= Michael Cassara =

American casting director, educator and genealogist

Michael Andrew Cassara (born April 14, 1981 in Cleveland Heights, Ohio) is an American casting director, educator, and genealogist. His casting work spans musicals, plays, and films and he has been nominated for two Artios Awards by the Casting Society of America.

== Career ==
Cassara serves as the resident casting director for the New York Musical Theatre Festival, where he has cast more than 70 new musicals since the festival's inception in 2004. Recent New York credits include Forbidden Broadway, Fat Camp, The Jack Cole Project (dir. Chet Walker), and a number of independent films including Clear Blue Tuesday, Grantham and Rose, and Contest. His work has frequently been seen at regional theatres including Gulfshore Playhouse, the Olney Theatre Center, the Goodspeed Opera House, Kitchen Theatre, Great Lakes Theater Festival, Idaho Shakespeare Festival, and The Old Globe. As an educator specializing in entertainment industry topics and audition technique, he has taught master classes and workshops at Baldwin Wallace University, Clarion University of Pennsylvania, Elon University, Indiana University, Kent State University, New York University, Northwestern University, Ohio Northern University, Ohio University, Otterbein University, Pace University, SUNY New Paltz, The University of New Hampshire, The University of the Arts, and also throughout Europe.

In 2013, he cast the world premiere of Robert Wuhl's play Hit-Lit.

He is particularly known for his collaborations with contemporary musical theatre writers, including Gerard Alessandrini, Neil Berg, Randy Blair, Douglas J. Cohen, Joe DiPietro, Tim Drucker, Kait Kerrigan, Timothy Huang, Bree Lowdermilk, Ryan Scott Oliver, Richard Maltby, Jr., and David Shire and artists including Hinton Battle, Sheryl Kaller, Richard Kind, Dan Knechtges, Baayork Lee, John McDaniel, Joe Morton, Billy Porter, Lonny Price, Randy Skinner, Alex Timbers, and BD Wong. He is a member of the Casting Society of America.

== Education ==
Cassara is a graduate of Hawken School and Otterbein College where he received his BFA in musical theatre.

== Genealogist ==
A lifelong genealogist, Cassara specializes in Italian and Sicilian research and has spoken numerous times at the RootsTech conference in Salt Lake City, Utah. He is a member of the Association of Professional Genealogists and holds a Certificate in Genealogical Research from Boston University.
