= The Secret Life of Bees =

The Secret Life of Bees may refer to:

- The Secret Life of Bees (novel), a 2001 novel by Sue Monk Kidd
- The Secret Life of Bees (film), a 2008 film based on the novel
- The Secret Life of Bees (musical), a 2019 musical based on the novel
