= The Secret Life of Bees (musical) =

Musical based on the 2001 novel of the same name

- Music: Duncan Sheik
- Lyrics: Susan Birkenhead
- Book: Lynn Nottage
- Basis: The Secret Life of Bees (2001); By: Sue Monk Kidd
- Productions: 2019 Off-Broadway; 2023 London

The Secret Life of Bees is a stage musical with a book by Lynn Nottage, music by Duncan Sheik and lyrics by Susan Birkenhead. The musical premiered Off-Broadway in 2019 to critical acclaim, winning the Outer Critics Circle Award for Outstanding New Off-Broadway Musical, along with Best New Musical nominations from the Drama Desk Awards, Lucille Lortel Awards, and the Drama League Awards.

The musical is set in the 1960s in South Carolina, and tells the story of Lily Owens and Rosaleen, two young women who become friends in the face of adversity, and embark on an adventure of self discovery thanks to the Boatwright sisters, three women they meet who work as beekeepers on a honey farm. The story had previously been adapted as a film of the same name, released in 2008, directed and written by Gina Prince-Bythewood.

== Production history ==
=== Vassar (2017) ===
The show was first performed at Vassar College in July 2017 as part of the Powerhouse Theatre Program summer season, in partnership with New York Stage and Film.

=== Off-Broadway (2019) ===
The musical premiered on the Linda Gross Stage at the Atlantic Theatre Company on May 12, 2019. The musical garnered critical acclaim and extended its run from July 7 til July 21, 2019. The show was directed by Sam Gold. Orchestrations were done by John Clancy, with musical direction by Jason Hart. Choreography was done by Chris Walker, with costumes by Dede Ayite.

=== London (2023) ===
A London production opened at the Almeida Theatre, running from April 9, 2023 until May 27, 2023. The show was directed by Whitney White and choreographed by Shelley Maxwell. Musical direction was done by Nigel Lilley with costuming by Qween Jean.

== Original cast and characters ==
Character	Off-Broadway (2019)	London (2023)
Rosaleen	Saycon Sengbloh	Abiona Omonua
Lily Owens	Elizabeth Teeter	Eleanor Worthington-Cox
August Boatwright	LaChanze	Rachel John
May Boatwright	Anastacia McCleskey	Danielle Fiamanya
June Boatwright	Eisa Davis	Ava Brennan
Zachary Taylor	Brett Gray	Noah Thomas
Neil	Nathaniel Stampley	Tarinn Callender

== Musical numbers ==
Act I

- "River of Melting Sun" - Company
- "The Girl Who Killed Her Mother" - Lily
- "Sign My Name" - Lily, Rosaleen
- "Better Than This" - Lily, Rosaleen
- "Tek A Hol A My Soul" - Company
- "Tek A Hol A My Soul (reprise)" - June, May, Neil
- "The Secret Life of Bees" - August, Company
- "Fifty-Five Fairlane" - Lily, Zachary
- "All About You" - Rosaleen
- "Our Lady of Chains" - Company

Act II

- "River of Melting Sun (reprise)" - August, June, May, Rosaleen
- "Who Knew?" - Rosaleen
- "What Do You Love?" - Lily, Zachary
- "Trouble on the House" - August, June
- "What Do You Love? (reprise)" - Lily, Zachary
- "Hold This House Together" - August, June, May, Neil
- "Frogs and Fireflies" - Lily, May
- "All You Need to Know" - August, Company
- "What's Never Been" - Lily, Zach, Company
- "Marry Me" - Neil
- "The Secret Life of Bees (reprise)" - Company
