= Judas Iscariot =

Disciple and betrayer of Jesus

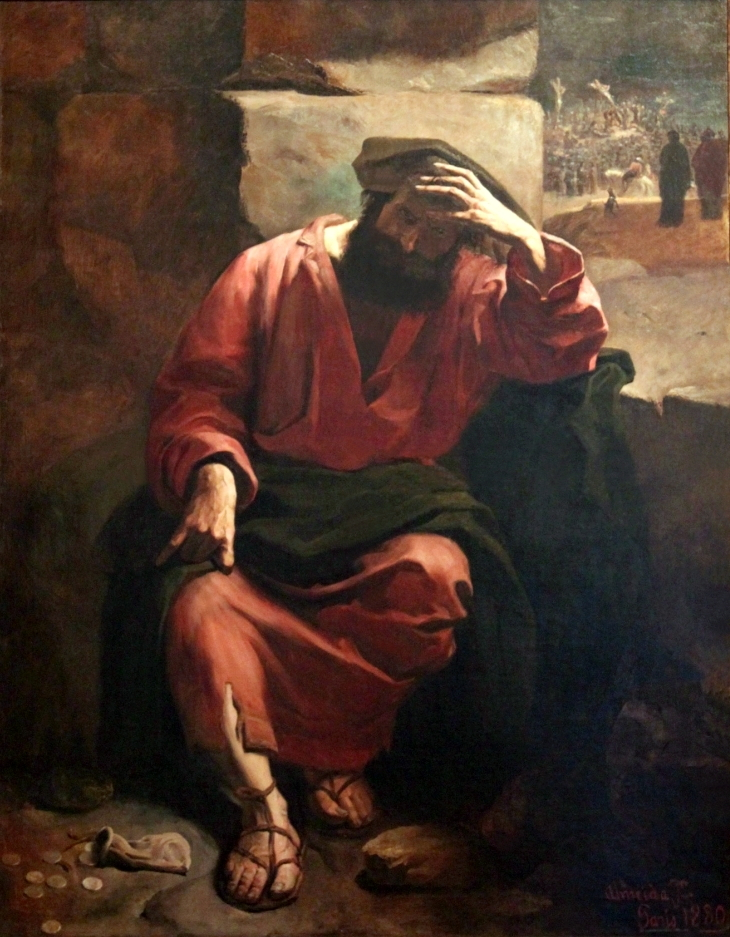
- Judas's Remorse (1880) by Almeida Júnior

Personal life
- Born: AD 3 Kerioth, Judaea, Roman Empire
- Died: AD 30 to 33 Jerusalem, Judea, Roman Empire
- Cause of death: Suicide by hanging
- Parent: Simon Iscariot (father)
- Known for: Betraying Jesus

Judas Iscariot (Biblical Greek: Ἰούδας Ἰσκαριώτης, romanized: Ioúdas Iskariṓtēs; c. 3 AD – c. 30 to 33 AD) was, according to Christianity's four canonical gospels, one of the original Twelve Apostles of Jesus Christ. Judas betrayed Jesus to the Sanhedrin in the Garden of Gethsemane in exchange for thirty pieces of silver, by kissing him on the cheek and addressing him as "Rabbi" to reveal his identity to the crowd who had come to arrest him. In modern times, his name is often used synonymously with betrayal, treason, or hatred.

Jesus is described predicting Judas' betrayal at the Last Supper in all four canonical gospels. The Gospel of Mark 14:11 and the Gospel of Matthew 26:15 state that Judas committed the betrayal in exchange for payment, with Matthew specifying the 30 pieces of silver. The Gospel of Luke 22:3 and the Gospel of John 13:2 and 13:27 suggest that he was possessed by Satan. According to Matthew 27:1–10, after learning that Jesus was to be crucified, Judas attempted to return the money he had been paid for his betrayal to the chief priests and hanged himself. The priests used the money to buy a field to bury strangers in, which was called the "Field of Blood" because it had been bought with blood money. Acts of the Apostles 1:18 quotes Peter as saying that Judas used the money to buy the field himself, and he "[fell] headlong ... burst asunder in the midst, and all his bowels gushed out." His place among the 12 Apostles was later filled by Matthias.

The Gnostic Gospel of Judas portrays Judas's actions as done in obedience to instructions given to him by Jesus, and that Judas understood the Old Testament God (the Demiurge) as distinguishable from the true, unknowable God of the New Testament, the Monad or the One. Jesus transcends the demiurge's domain, revealing deeper truths to Judas. This opens both Jesus and Judas to disclose a broader understanding of the Pleroma, which has inspired artists, writers, and thinkers. Irenaeus denounced the Gospel as heresy in 180 AD.

Because of his notorious role in the gospel narratives, Judas remains a controversial figure in Christian history. His betrayal is seen as setting in motion the events that led to Jesus's crucifixion and resurrection, which, according to traditional Christian theology brought salvation to humanity. Since the Middle Ages, Judas has sometimes been portrayed as a personification of the Jewish people and the Pharisees, and his betrayal has been used to justify Christian antisemitism.

== Historicity ==
Although Judas Iscariot's historical existence is generally widely accepted among secular historians, this relative consensus has not gone entirely unchallenged. The earliest possible allusion to Judas comes from the First Epistle to the Corinthians 11:23–24, in which Paul the Apostle does not mention Judas by name but uses the passive voice of the Greek word paradídōmi (παραδίδωμι), which most Bible translations render as "was betrayed": "... the Lord Jesus on the night when he was betrayed took a loaf of bread ..." Nonetheless, some biblical scholars argue that the word paradídōmi should be translated as "was handed over". This translation could still refer to Judas, but it could also instead refer to God metaphorically "handing Jesus over" to the Romans.

In his book Antisemitism and Modernity (2006), the Jewish scholar Hyam Maccoby suggests that, in the New Testament, the name "Judas" was constructed as an attack on the Judaeans or on the Judaean religious establishment held responsible for executing Jesus. In his book The Sins of Scripture (2009), John Shelby Spong concurs with this argument, insisting, "The whole story of Judas has the feeling of being contrived ... The earliest Christian writings do not mention betrayal by a member of the twelve disciples. Judas is first placed into the Christian story by the Gospel of Mark (3:19), which was written in the early 70s AD."

Most scholars reject these arguments for non-historicity. These scholars note that there is nothing in the gospels to associate Judas with Judeans except his name, which was an extremely common one for Jewish men during the first century. Scholars also note that numerous other figures named "Judas" are mentioned throughout the New Testament and that none are portrayed negatively. Positive figures named Judas mentioned in the New Testament include the prophet Judas Barsabbas (Acts 15:22–33), Jesus's brother Jude (Mark 6:3; Matt 13:55; Jude 1), and the apostle Judas the son of James (Luke 6:14–16; Acts 1:13; John 14:22).

== Life ==
=== Name and background ===
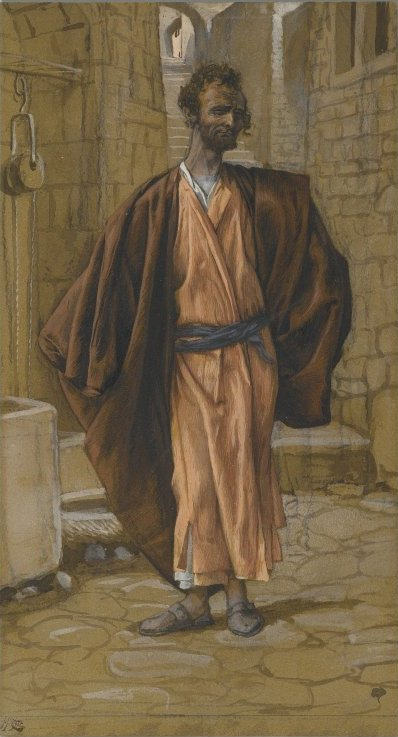
Judas Iscariot (between 1886 and 1894) by James Tissot

The name "Judas" (Ὶούδας) is a Greek rendering of the Hebrew name Judah (יהודה, Y^{e}hûdâh, Hebrew for "praise" or "praised"), which was an extremely common name for Jewish men during the first century AD, due to the renowned hero Judas Maccabeus. Consequently, numerous other figures with this name are mentioned throughout the New Testament. In the Gospel of Mark 3:13–19, which was written in the mid-60s or early 70s AD, Judas Iscariot is the only apostle named "Judas". Matthew 10:2–4 shares this portrayal. The Gospel of Luke 6:12–19, however, replaces the apostle whom Mark and Matthew call "Thaddeus" with "Judas son of James". Peter Stanford suggests that this renaming may represent an effort by the author of the Gospel of Luke to create a "good Judas" in contrast to the betrayer Judas Iscariot.

Judas's epithet "Iscariot" (Ὶσκάριωθ or Ὶσκαριώτης), which distinguishes him from the other people named "Judas" in the gospels, is usually thought to be a Greek rendering of the Hebrew phrase איש־קריות, (Îš-Qrîyôt), meaning "the man from Kerioth". This interpretation is supported by the statement in the Gospel of John 6:71 that Judas was "the son of Simon Iscariot". Nonetheless, this interpretation of the name is not fully accepted by all scholars. One of the most popular alternative explanations holds that "Iscariot" (ܣܟܪܝܘܛܐ, 'Skaryota' in Syriac Aramaic, per the Peshitta text) may be a corruption of the Latin word sicarius, meaning "dagger man", which referred to a member of the Sicarii (סיקריים in Aramaic), a group of Jewish rebels who were known for assassinating people in crowds using long knives hidden under their cloaks. This interpretation is problematic, however, because there is nothing in the gospels to associate Judas with the Sicarii, and there is no evidence that the Sicarii existed during the 30s AD, when Judas was alive.

A possibility advanced by Ernst Wilhelm Hengstenberg is that "Iscariot" means "the liar" or "the false one", from the Hebrew איש-שקרים. C. C. Torrey suggests instead the Aramaic form שְׁקַרְיָא or אִשְׁקַרְיָא, with the same meaning. Stanford rejects this, arguing that the gospel writers follow Judas's name with the statement that he betrayed Jesus, so it would be redundant for them to call him "the false one" before immediately stating that he was a traitor. Some have proposed that the word derives from an Aramaic word meaning "red color", from the root סקר. Another hypothesis holds that the word derives from one of the Aramaic roots סכר or סגר. This would mean "to deliver", based on the Septuagint rendering of Isaiah 19:4 (a theory advanced by J. Alfred Morin). The epithet could also be associated with the manner of Judas's death, hanging. This would mean Iscariot derives from a kind of Greek-Aramaic hybrid: אִסְכַּרְיוּתָא, Iskarioutha, meaning "chokiness" or "constriction". This might indicate that the epithet was applied posthumously by the remaining disciples, but Joan E. Taylor has argued that it was a descriptive name given to Judas by Jesus, since other disciples such as Simon Peter/Cephas (Kephas "rock") were also given such names.

=== Role as an apostle ===
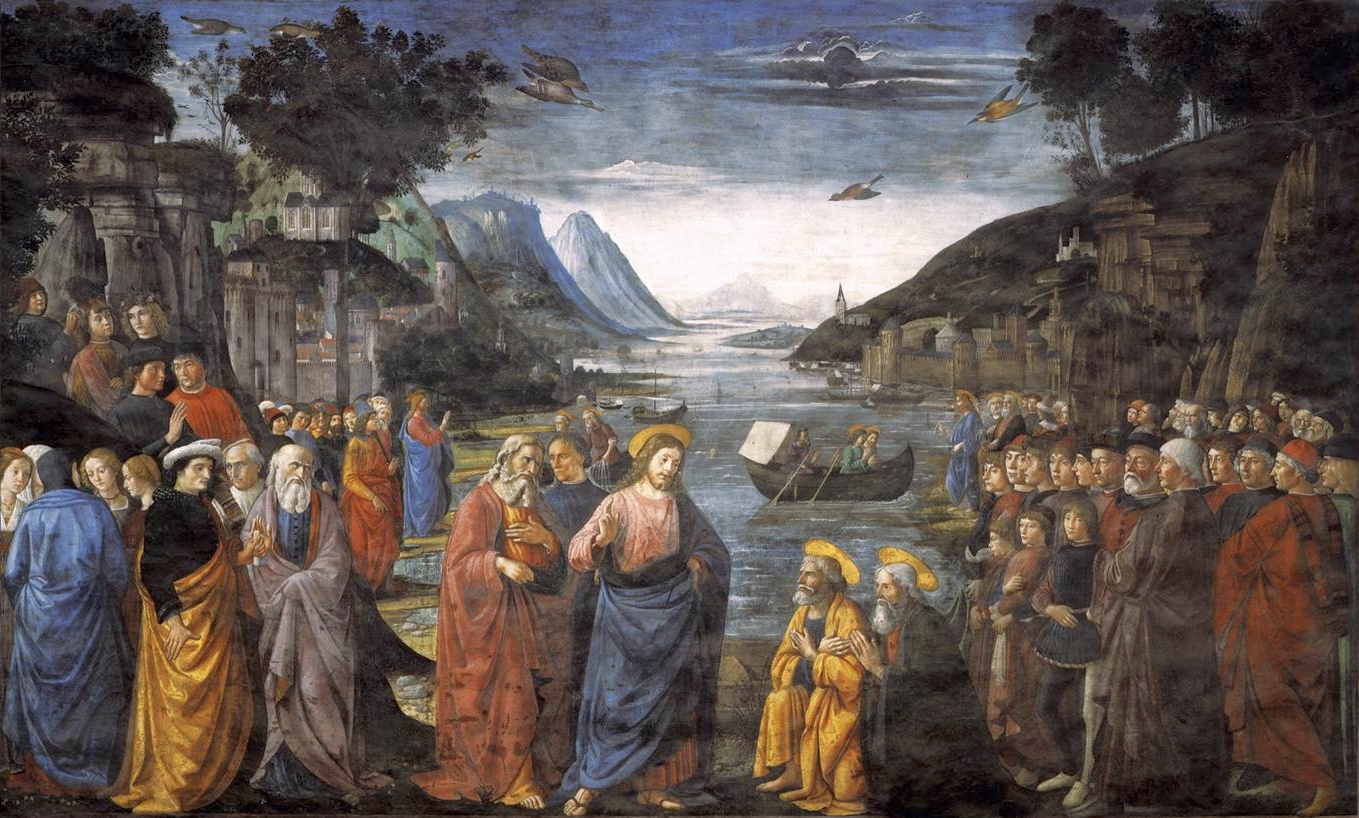
Calling of the Apostles (1481) by Domenico Ghirlandaio

Although the canonical gospels frequently disagree on the names of some minor apostles, all four list Judas Iscariot as one of them. The Synoptic Gospels state that Jesus sent out "the twelve" (including Judas) with power over unclean spirits and with a ministry of preaching and healing: Judas clearly played an active part in this apostolic ministry alongside the other eleven. However, in the Gospel of John, Judas's outlook was differentiated – many of Jesus's disciples abandoned him because of the difficulty of accepting his teachings, and Jesus asked the twelve if they would also leave him. Simon Peter spoke for the twelve: "Lord, to whom shall we go? You have the words of eternal life," but Jesus observed then that although he himself had chosen the twelve, one of them (unnamed by Jesus, but identified by the narrator) was "a devil" who would betray him.

One of the best-attested and most reliable statements made by Jesus in the gospels comes from the Gospel of Matthew 19:28, in which Jesus tells his apostles: "in the new world, when the Son of Man shall sit on his glorious throne, you will also sit on twelve thrones, judging the Twelve Tribes of Israel." New Testament scholar Bart D. Ehrman concludes, "This is not a tradition that was likely to have been made up by a Christian later, after Jesus's death – since one of these twelve had abandoned his cause and betrayed him. No one thought that Judas Iscariot would be seated on a glorious throne in the Kingdom of God. That saying, therefore, appears to go back to Jesus, and indicates, then, that he had twelve close disciples, whom he predicted would reign in the coming Kingdom."

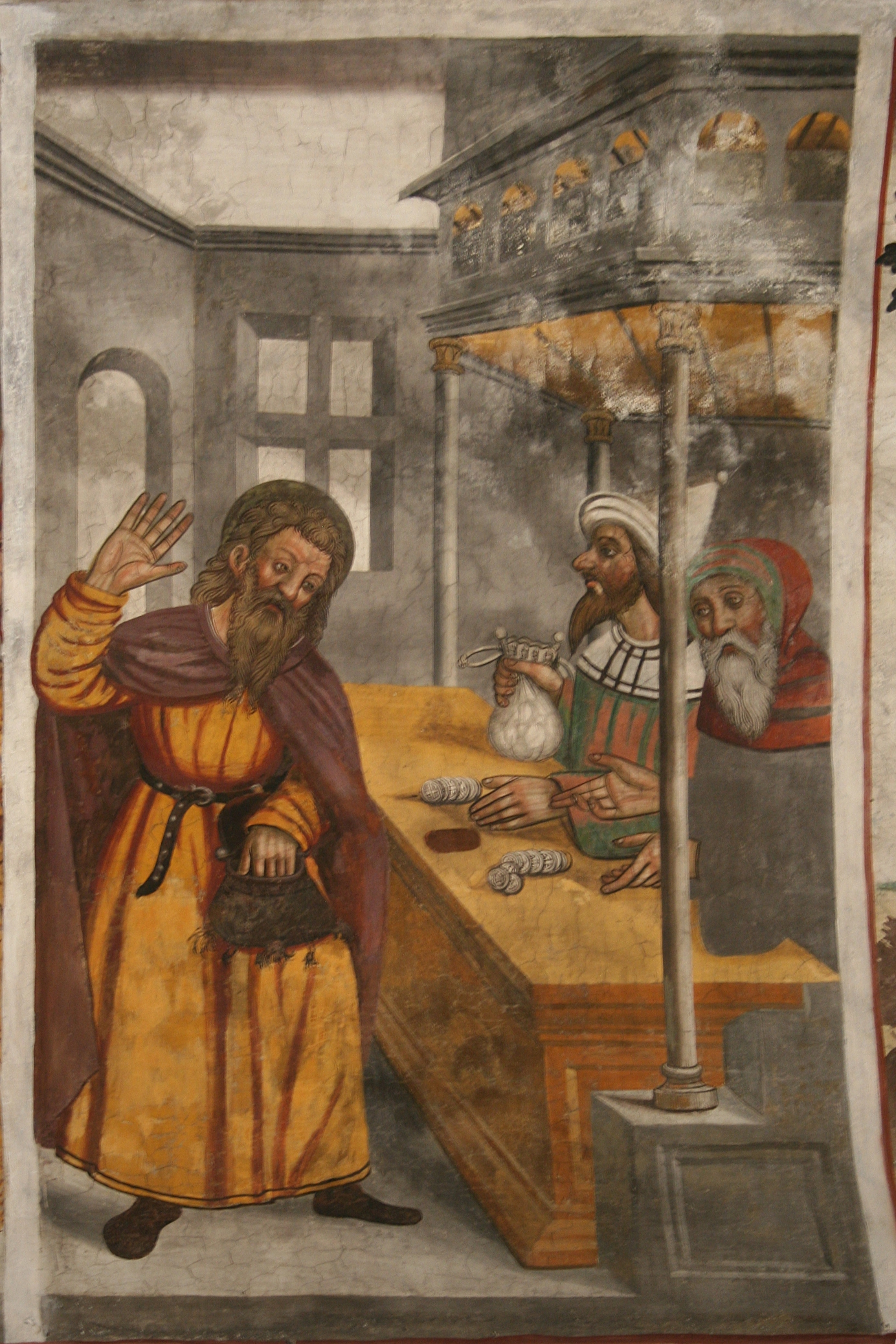
A 16th-century fresco depicting Judas being paid

Matthew directly states that Judas betrayed Jesus for a bribe of "thirty pieces of silver" by identifying him with a kiss ("the kiss of Judas") to arresting soldiers of the High Priest Caiaphas, who then turned Jesus over to Pontius Pilate's soldiers. Mark's Gospel states that the chief priests were looking for a way to arrest Jesus. They decided not to do so during the feast [of the Passover], since they were afraid that people would riot; instead, they chose the night before the feast to arrest him. According to Luke's account, Satan entered Judas at this time.

According to the account in the Gospel of John, Judas carried the disciples' money bag or box (γλωσσόκομον, glōssokomon), but the Gospel of John makes no mention of the thirty pieces of silver as a fee for betrayal. The evangelist comments in John 12:5–6 that Judas spoke fine words about giving money to the poor, but the reality was "not that he cared for the poor, but [that] he was a thief, and had the money box; and he used to take what was put in it." However, in John 13:27–30, when Judas left the gathering of Jesus and his disciples with betrayal in mind, some [of the disciples] thought that Judas might have been leaving to buy supplies or on a charitable errand.

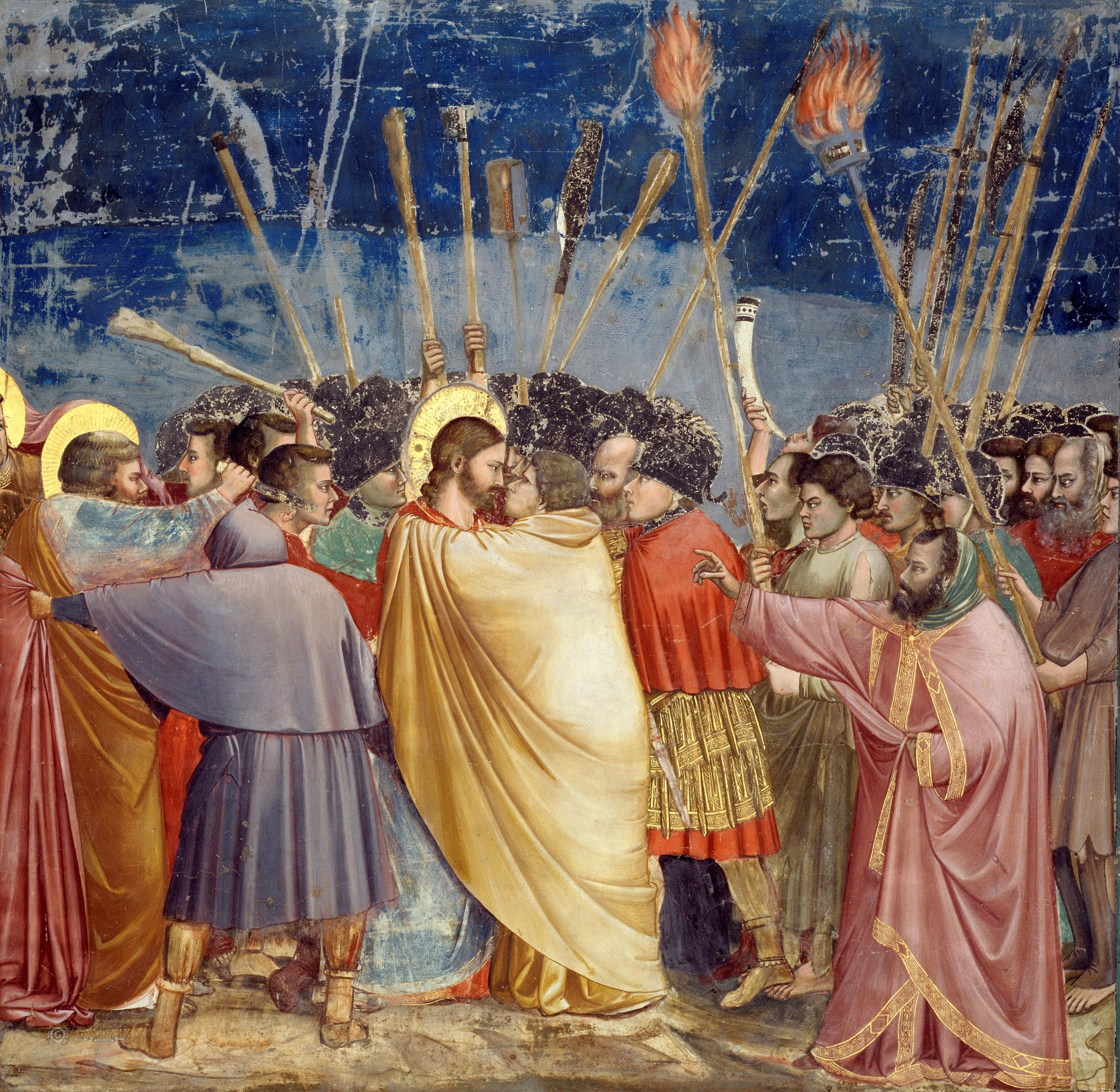
The Kiss of Judas by Giotto di Bondone (between 1304 and 1306) depicts Judas's identifying kiss in the Garden of Gethsemane

Ehrman argues that Judas's betrayal "is about as historically certain as anything else in the tradition", pointing out that the betrayal is independently attested in the Gospel of Mark, in the Gospel of John, and in the Book of Acts. Ehrman also contends that it is highly unlikely that early Christians would have made up the story of Judas's betrayal, since it reflects poorly on Jesus's judgment in choosing him as an apostle. Nonetheless, Ehrman argues that Judas told the authorities not Jesus's location, but Jesus's secret teaching that he was the Messiah. This, he holds, explains why the authorities did not try to arrest Jesus prior to Judas's betrayal. John P. Meier sums up the historical consensus, stating, "We only know two basic facts about [Judas]: (1) Jesus chose him as one of the Twelve, and (2) he handed over Jesus to the Jerusalem authorities, thus precipitating Jesus's execution."

=== Death ===
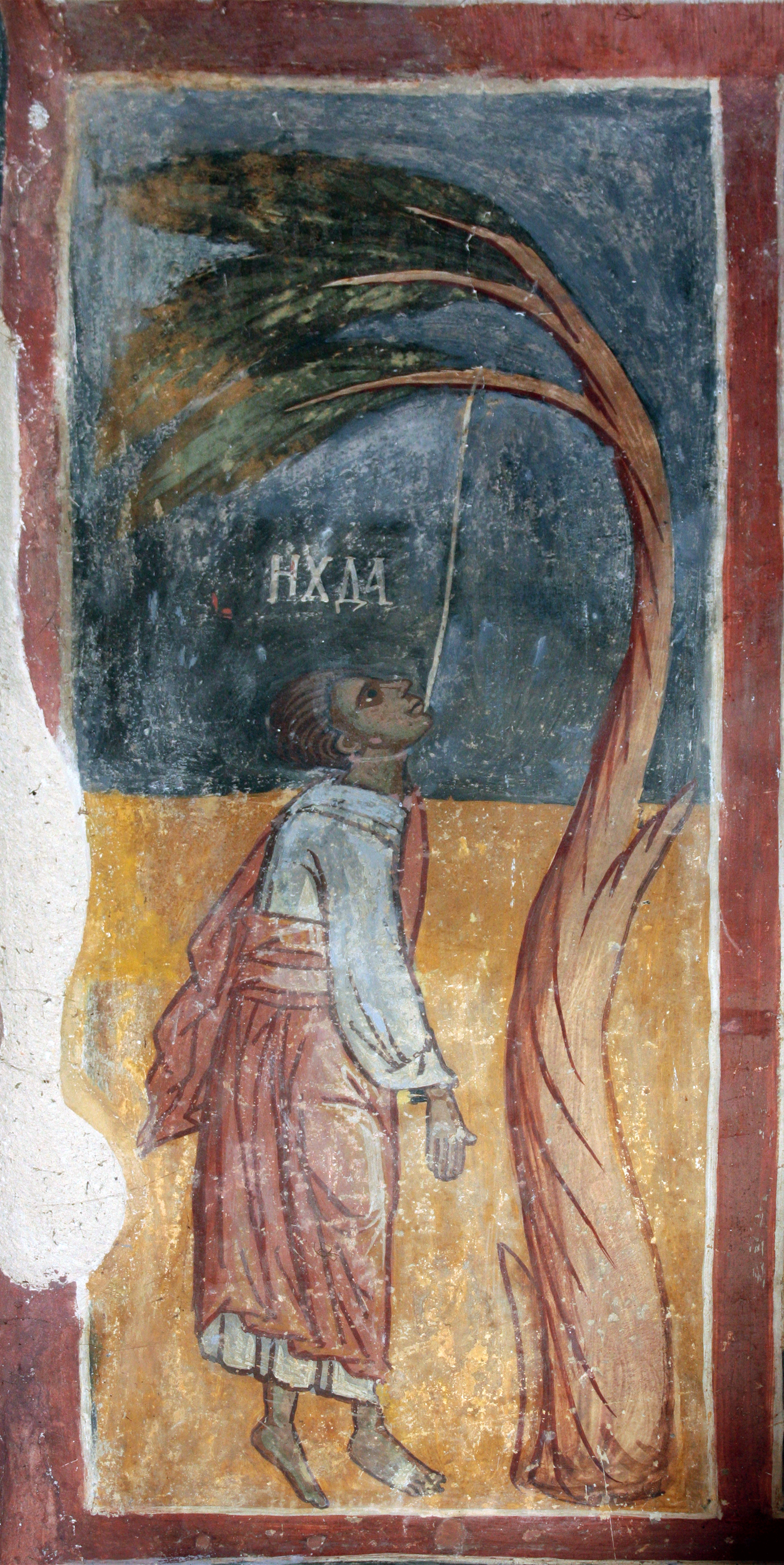
A sixteenth-century fresco from Tarzhishte Monastery, Strupets, Bulgaria, showing Judas hanging himself as described in Matthew 27:1–10

Many different accounts of Judas's death have survived from antiquity, both within and outside the New Testament. Matthew 27:1–10 states that after learning that Jesus was to be crucified, Judas was overcome by remorse and attempted to return the 30 pieces of silver to the priests, but they would not accept them because they were blood money, so he threw them on the ground and left. Afterwards, he committed suicide by hanging himself in accordance with Mosaic law (Deuteronomy 21:22–23). The priests then used the money to buy a potter's field, which became known as Akeldama (חקל דמא – Ḥakel dama, the Field of Blood) because it had been bought with blood money. Acts 1:18 states that Judas used the money to buy a field, and "[fell] headlong ... burst asunder in the midst, and all his bowels gushed out." In this account, Judas's death is apparently by accident, and he shows no signs of remorse.

The early Church Father Papias of Hierapolis records in his Expositions of the Sayings of the Lord (which was probably written around 100 AD) that Judas was afflicted by God's wrath; his body became so enormously bloated that he could not pass through a street with buildings on either side. His face became so swollen that a doctor could not even locate his eyes with an optical instrument. Judas's genitals became enormously swollen and oozed with pus and worms. Finally, he killed himself on his own land by pouring out his innards onto the ground, which stank so horribly that, even in Papias's own time a century later, people still could not pass the site without holding their noses. This story was well known among Christians in antiquity and was often told in competition with the two conflicting stories from the New Testament.

According to the apocryphal Gospel of Nicodemus, which was probably written in the fourth century AD, Judas was overcome with remorse and went home to tell his wife, who was roasting a chicken on a spit over a charcoal fire, that he was going to kill himself, because he knew Jesus would rise from the dead and, when he did, he would punish him. Judas's wife laughed and told him that Jesus could no more rise from the dead than he could resurrect the chicken she was cooking. Immediately, the chicken was restored to life and began to crow. Judas then ran away and hanged himself. In the apocryphal Gospel of Judas, Judas has a vision of the disciples stoning and persecuting him.

The discrepancy between the two different accounts of Judas's death in Matthew 27:1–10 and Acts 1:18 has proven to be a serious challenge to those who support the idea of Biblical inerrancy. This problem was one of the points leading C. S. Lewis, for example, to reject the view "that every statement in Scripture must be historical truth". Nonetheless, various attempts at harmonization have been suggested. Generally they have followed literal interpretations such as that of Augustine of Hippo, which suggest that these simply describe different aspects of the same event: that Judas hanged himself in the field, and the rope eventually snapped and the fall burst his body open, or that the accounts of Acts and Matthew refer to two different transactions. Some have taken the descriptions as figurative: that the "falling prostrate" was Judas in anguish, (Note: The Monthly Christian Spectator 1851–1859 p. 459 "while some writers regard the account of Judas's death as simply figurative ... seized with preternatural anguish for his crime and its consequences his bowels gushed out.") and the "bursting out of the bowels" is pouring out emotion. (Note: Clarence Jordan The Substance of Faith: and Other Cotton Patch Sermons p. 148 "Greeks thought of the bowels as being the seat of the emotions, the home of the soul. It's like saying that all of Judas's motions burst out, burst asunder.")

Modern scholars reject these approaches; ancient historical works can differ when reporting events, with variations between Tacitus, Suetonius, and Plutarch on Otho's death similar to those in the gospels. Arie W. Zwiep argues that neither story was meant to be read in light of the other and against harmonizations, though other scholars argue Luke-Acts used Matthew or vice versa. David A. Reed argues that the Matthew account is a midrashic exposition that allows the author to present the event as a fulfillment of prophetic passages from the Old Testament. They argue that the author adds imaginative details, such as the 30 pieces of silver and Judas hanging himself, to an earlier tradition about Judas's death.

Matthew's description of the death as fulfillment of a prophecy "spoken through Jeremiah the prophet" has caused difficulties, since it does not clearly correspond to any known version of the Book of Jeremiah but does appear to refer to a story from the Book of Zechariah which describes the return of a payment of thirty pieces of silver. Even writers such as Jerome and John Calvin conclude that this was obviously an error. (Note: Frederick Dale Bruner, Matthew: A Commentary (Eerdmans, 2004), p. 710; Jerome, Epistolae 57.7: "This passage is not found in Jeremiah but in Zechariah, in quite different words and a different order" "NPNF2-06. Jerome: The Principal Works of St. Jerome – Christian Classics Ethereal Library". Archived from the original on 8 October 2008.; John Calvin, Commentary on a Harmony of the Evangelists, Matthew, Mark and Luke, 3:177: "The passage itself plainly shows that the name of Jeremiah has been put down by mistake, instead of Zechariah, for in Jeremiah we find nothing of this sort, nor any thing that even approaches to it." "Commentary on Matthew, Mark, Luke – Volume 3 – Christian Classics Ethereal Library". Archived from the original on 25 November 2009..) Evangelical theologian James R. White has suggested the misattribution arises from a supposed Jewish practice of using the name of a major prophet to refer to the whole content of the scroll group, including books written by minor prophets placed in the same grouping.

Some scholars have suggested that the writer may also have had a passage from Jeremiah in mind, such as chapters 18:1–4 and 19:1–13 which refer to a potter's jar and a burial place, and chapter 32:6–15 which refers to a burial place and an earthenware jar. Raymond Brown suggests "the most plausible [explanation] is that Matthew 27:9–10 is presenting a mixed citation with words taken both from Zechariah and Jeremiah, and ... he refers to that combination by one name. Jeremiah 18–9 concerns a potter (18:2–; 19:1), a purchase (19:1), the Valley of Hinnom (where the Field of Blood is traditionally located, 19:2), 'innocent blood' (19:4), and the renaming of a place for burial (19:6, 11); and Jer 32:6–5 tells of the purchase of a field with silver."

Classicist Glenn W. Most suggests that Judas's death in Acts can be interpreted figuratively, writing that πρηνὴς γενόμενος should be translated as meaning his body went prone, rather than falling headlong, and that the spilling of the entrails invokes the imagery of dead snakes and their burst-open bellies. Hence Luke was stating that Judas took the body posture of a snake and died like one. However, the Catholic biblical scholar John L. McKenzie states "This passage probably echoes the fate of the wicked in ..." the Deuterocanonical book Wisdom of Solomon 4:19: "... [the Lord] will dash them speechless to the ground, and shake them from the foundations; they will be left utterly dry and barren, and they will suffer anguish, and the memory of them will perish."

== Betrayal of Jesus ==
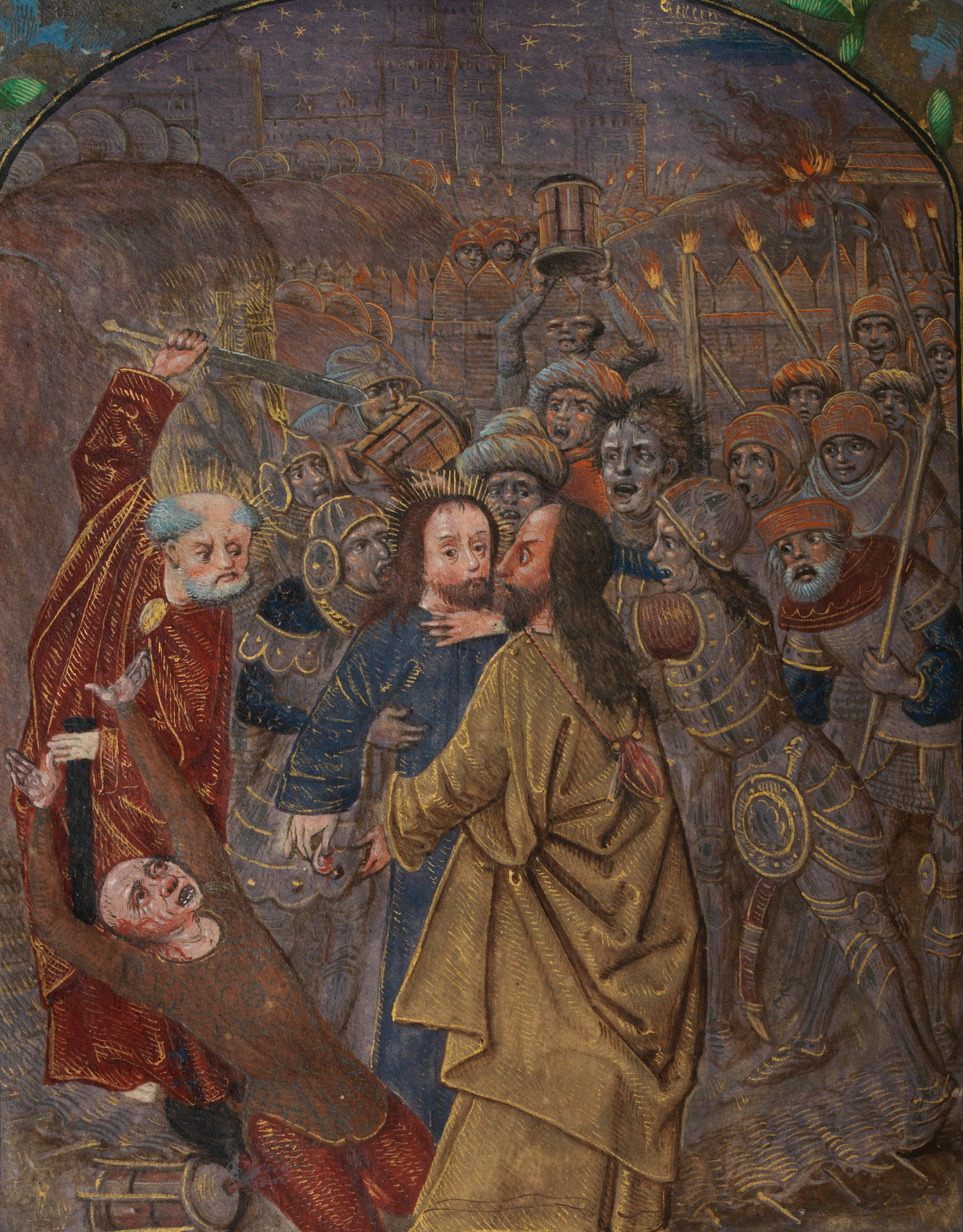
The Betrayal: Peter raises his sword as the soldiers seize Jesus. Illumination from a western manuscript, c. 1504.

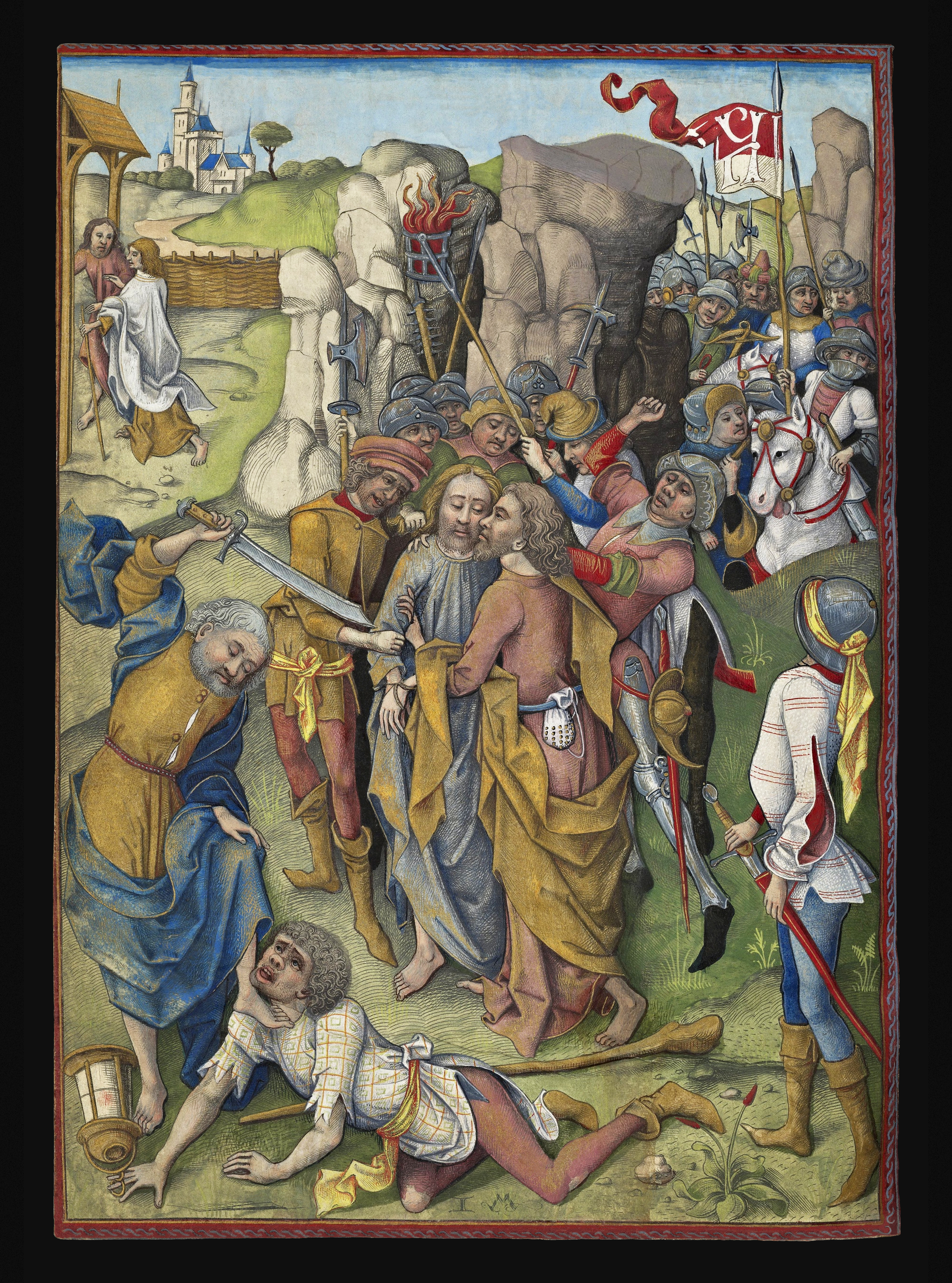
The Kiss of Judas Iscariot, a fifteenth-century engraving

There are several explanations as to why Judas betrayed Jesus. In the earliest account, in the Gospel of Mark, when he goes to the chief priests to betray Jesus, he is offered money as a reward, but it is not clear that money is his motivation. In the Gospel of Matthew account, on the other hand, he asks what they will pay him for handing Jesus over. In the Gospel of Luke and the Gospel of John, the devil enters into Judas, causing him to offer to betray Jesus. The Gospel of John account has Judas complaining that money has been spent on expensive perfumes to anoint Jesus, which could have been spent on the poor, but adds that he was the keeper of the apostles' purse and used to steal from it. According to some, Judas thought he could get the money for betraying Jesus without Jesus being killed, as he would escape, as he had done many times before.

One suggestion is that Judas expected Jesus to overthrow Roman rule in Judea. In this view, Judas is a disillusioned disciple betraying Jesus not so much because he loved money, but because he loved his country and thought Jesus had failed it. Another is that Jesus was causing unrest likely to increase tensions with the Roman authorities, and they thought he should be restrained until after the Passover, when everyone had gone back home, and the commotion had died down.

The gospels suggest that Jesus foresaw and allowed Judas's betrayal. One explanation is that Jesus allowed the betrayal because it would fulfill God's plan. Another is that regardless of the betrayal, Jesus was ultimately destined for crucifixion.

In April 2006, a Coptic papyrus manuscript titled the Gospel of Judas from 200 AD was translated, suggesting that Jesus told Judas to betray him, although some scholars question the translation. However, there is a consensus amongst scholars that this text contains no historical information.

Judas is the subject of philosophical writings. Origen of Alexandria, in his Commentary on John's Gospel, reflects on Judas's interactions with the other apostles and Jesus's confidence in him prior to his betrayal. Other philosophical reflections on Judas include The Problem of Natural Evil by Bertrand Russell and "Three Versions of Judas", a short story by Jorge Luis Borges. They point to ideological contradictions in the discrepancy between Judas's actions and his eternal punishment. Bruce Reichenbach argues that if Jesus foresees Judas's betrayal, then the betrayal is not an act of free will and therefore should not be punishable. Conversely, it is argued that just because the betrayal was foretold, it does not prevent Judas from exercising his own free will in this matter. Other scholars argue that Judas acted in obedience to God's will. The gospels suggest that Judas is apparently bound up with the fulfillment of God's purposes (Note: Attributed to these verses:) yet "woe is upon him", and he would "have been better unborn" (Matthew 26:23–25). The difficulty inherent in the saying is its paradox: if Judas had not been born, the Son of Man would apparently no longer do "as it is written of him." The consequence of this apologetic approach is that Judas's actions come to be seen as necessary and unavoidable, yet leading to condemnation. Another explanation is that Judas's birth and betrayal did not necessitate the only way the Son of Man could have suffered and been crucified. The earliest churches believed "as it is written of him" to be prophetic, fulfilling Scriptures such as the suffering servant in Isaiah 52–53 and the righteous one in Psalm 22, which do not require betrayal (at least by Judas) as the means to suffering. Regardless of any necessity, Judas is held responsible for his act (Mark 14:21; Luke 22:22; Matt 26:24).

In his 1965 book The Passover Plot, British New Testament scholar Hugh J. Schonfield suggests that the crucifixion of Christ was a conscious re-enactment of Biblical prophecy and that Judas acted with the full knowledge and consent of Jesus in "betraying" him to the authorities. The book has been variously described as "factually groundless", based on "little data" and "wild suppositions", "disturbing", and "tawdry".

== Judas's eternal destination ==
Christian theology has debated the nature of Judas's eternal destination. Some have argued that Judas was damned due to the despair which caused him to subsequently commit suicide. An example of this view is from Cornelius à Lapide, "Judas then added to his former sin the further sin of despair. It was not a more heinous sin, but one more fatal to himself, as thrusting him down to the very depths of hell. He might, on his repentance, have asked (and surely have obtained) pardon of God. But, like Cain, he despaired of forgiveness." Theophylact presents a different view, stating that Judas "hanged himself thinking to precede Jesus into hades and there to plead for his own salvation." According to the book of Matthew 27:5, Judas did commit suicide by hanging himself. However, according to the book of Acts 1:18, it says that Judas died by falling off a cliff with his intestines spilling out. These two accounts are usually considered complementary of one another, suggesting Judas hanged himself and, after either bodily decomposition or a breaking of the noose, fell and burst open.

=== Protestant theologians ===
The Catholic theologian Erasmus believed that Judas was free to change his intention, but Martin Luther argued in rebuttal that Judas' will was immutable. John Calvin in Institutes of the Christian Religion 1, 18:4, quoted by David Lyle Jeffrey, states that Judas was predestined to damnation but writes on the question of Judas' guilt: "surely in Judas' betrayal, it will be no more right, because God himself willed that his son be delivered up and delivered him up to death, to ascribe the guilt of the crime to God than to transfer the credit for redemption to Judas." Karl Daub, in his book Judas Ischariot, writes that Judas should be considered "an incarnation of the devil" for whom "mercy and blessedness are alike impossible."

The Geneva Bible includes several additional notes on Judas Iscariot in its commentaries. In the Gospel of Matthew, after the Sanhedrin condemns Jesus Christ to death, are added the comments concerning Judas: "... late repentance brings desperation" (cf. Mat. 27:3), and "Although he abhor his sins, yet is he not displeased there with, but despairs in God's mercies, and seeks his own destruction" (cf. Mat. 27:4). Furthermore, within Acts of the Apostles is the comment, "Perpetual infamy is the reward of all such as by unlawfully gotten goods buy anything" when Judas purchased the "Field of Blood" with the 30 pieces of silver (cf Acts 1:18).

=== Catholic doctrine ===
The Catholic Church took no specific view concerning the damnation of Judas during Vatican II; speaking in generalities, that Council stated, "[We] must be constantly vigilant so that ... we may not be ordered to go into the eternal fire (cf. Mk. 25, 41) like wicked and slothful servants (cf. Mk. 25, 26), into the exterior darkness where 'there will be the weeping and the gnashing of teeth' (Mt. 22, 13 and 25, 30)." The Vatican proclaims individuals' Eternal Salvation only through the Canon of Saints. There is no 'Canon of the Damned.'

Thus, there is a school of thought within the Catholic Church that it is unknown whether Judas Iscariot is in Hell; for example, David Endres, writing in The Catholic Telegraph, cites Catechism of the Catholic Church §597 for the inability to make any determination whether Judas is in Hell. However, while that section of the catechism does instruct Catholics that the personal sin of Judas is unknown but to God, that statement is within the context that the Jewish people have no collective responsibility for Jesus's death: "... the Jews should not be spoken of as rejected or accursed as if this followed from holy Scripture." This seems to be defining a different doctrinal point (i.e., the relationship of Catholics with Jewish people), rather than making any sort of decision concerning Judas's particular judgment.

Ludwig Ott's reference book Fundamentals of Catholic Dogma identifies Judas Iscariot as an example of a person receiving punishment as a particular judgment.

The Catechism of the Council of Trent, which mentions Judas Iscariot several times, wrote that he possessed "motive unworthy" when he entered the priesthood and was thus sentenced to "eternal perdition". Furthermore, Judas is given as an example of a sinner that will "despair of mercy" because he looked "... on God as an avenger of crime and not, also, as a God of clemency and mercy." The Catechism of the Council of Trent continued the tradition of the early Church fathers, such as Pope Leo I ("... had [Judas] not thus denied His omnipotence, he would have obtained His mercy ..."), and Pope Gregory I ("The godless betrayer, shutting his mind to all these things, turned upon himself, not with a mind to repent, but in a madness of self-destruction ... even in the act of dying sinned unto the increase of his own eternal punishment.")

Also, the Decree of Justification, promulgated during Session VI of the Council of Trent, states in Canon 6, "If anyone shall say that it is not in the power of man to make his ways evil, but that God produces evil as well as the good works, not only by permission, but also properly and of Himself, so that the betrayal of Judas is not less His own proper work than the vocation of Paul; let him be anathema." Here, the Council makes clear that Judas exercised his own free will to betray Jesus Christ, rather than being predestined by God.

Liturgical institutions are part of the expressions of Sacred Tradition of the Catholic Church. Within the 1962 Roman Missal for the Tridentine Latin Mass, the Collect for Holy Thursday states: "O God, from whom Judas received the punishment of his guilt, and the thief the reward of his confession ... our Lord Jesus Christ gave to each a different recompense according to his merits ..." In his commentary on the Liturgical Year, Abbot Gueranger, O.S.B. states that the Collect reminds Catholics that both Judas and the good thief are guilty, "... and yet, the one is condemned, the other pardoned." Thus, the Tridentine Latin Mass, as currently celebrated, continues to foster the tradition within the Catholic Church that Judas was punished.

=== Other ===
In the Divine Comedy of Dante Alighieri, Judas is punished for all eternity in the ninth circle of Hell: in it, he is devoured by Lucifer, alongside Marcus Junius Brutus and Gaius Cassius Longinus (leaders of the group of senators that assassinated Julius Caesar). The innermost region of the ninth circle is reserved for traitors of masters and benefactors and is named Judecca, after Judas.

In his 1969 book Theologie der Drei Tage (English translation: Mysterium Paschale), Hans Urs von Balthasar emphasizes that Jesus was not betrayed but surrendered and delivered up by himself, since the meaning of the Greek word used by the New Testament, paradidonai (παραδιδόναι, Latin: tradere), is unequivocally "handing over of self". In the "Preface to the Second Edition", Balthasar takes a cue from Revelation 13:8 (Vulgate: agni qui occisus est ab origine mundi, NIV: "the Lamb who was slain from the creation of the world") to extrapolate the idea that God as "immanent Trinity" can endure and conquer godlessness, abandonment, and death in an "eternal super-kenosis". A Catholic priest, Richard Neuhaus, an admitted student of Balthasar, argues that it is unknown if Judas is in Hell, and it is also possible that Hell could be empty. However, French monsignor Léon Cristiani considers that Balthasar and Neuhaus are merely recycling the error of Origenism, which includes denying the eternity of Hell "... by a general rehabilitation of the damned, including, apparently, Satan." This error, while not considered a formal heresy, was condemned at a synod in 548 AD, which was subsequently confirmed by Pope Vigilius.

== Role in apocrypha ==
Judas has long interested esoteric groups, including many Gnostic sects. Irenaeus records the beliefs of one Gnostic sect, the Cainites, who held that Judas was an instrument of Sophia, or Divine Wisdom, thus earning the Demiurge 's hatred. His betrayal of Jesus was therefore seen as a victory over the material world. The Cainites later split into two groups, differing in their views on Jesus's ultimate significance in their cosmology.

=== Syriac Infancy Gospel ===
The Syriac Infancy Gospel borrows from some of the different versions of the Infancy Gospel of Thomas. However, it adds many of its own tales, probably from local legends, including one of Judas. This pseudepigraphic work tells how Judas, as a boy, was possessed by Satan, who caused him to bite himself or anyone else present. In one of these attacks, Judas bit the young Jesus in the side; and, by touching Him, Satan was exorcised. It further states that the side which Judas supposedly bit was the same side that was pierced by the Holy Lance at the Crucifixion.

=== Gospel of Judas ===
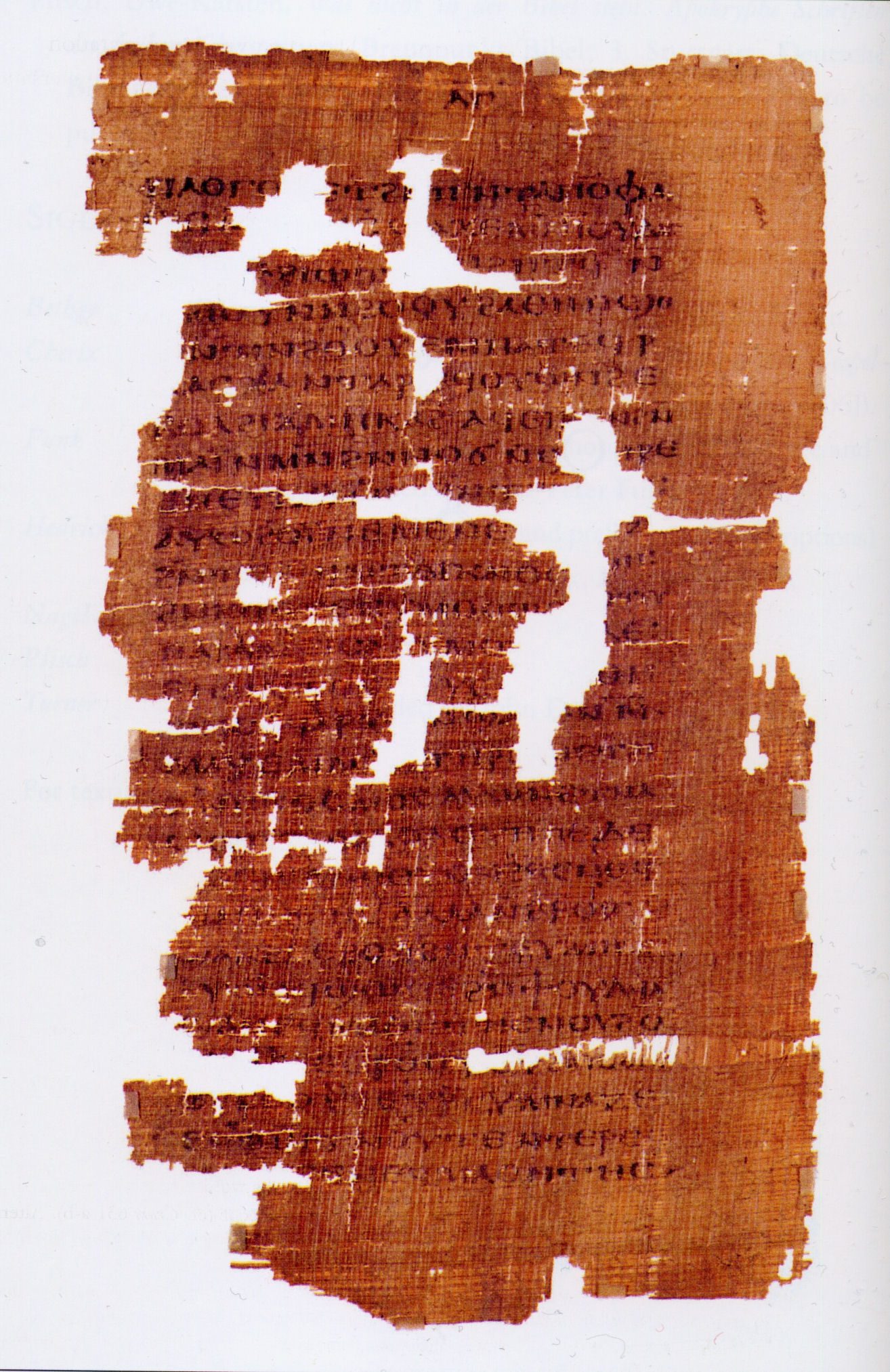
First page of the Gospel of Judas (Page 33 of Codex Tchacos)

During the 1970s, a Coptic papyrus codex (book) was discovered near Beni Masah, Egypt. It appeared to be a third- or fourth-century copy of a second-century original, relating a series of conversations in which Jesus and Judas interact and discuss the nature of the universe from a Gnostic viewpoint. The discovery was given dramatic international exposure in April 2006 when the US National Geographic magazine published a feature article entitled "The Gospel of Judas" with images of the fragile codex and analytical commentary by relevant experts and interested observers (but not a comprehensive translation). The article's introduction stated: "An ancient text lost for 1,700 years says Christ's betrayer was his truest disciple." The article points to some evidence that the original document was extant in the second century: "Around A.D. 180, Irenaeus, Bishop of Lyon, in what was then Roman Gaul, wrote a massive treatise called Against Heresies [in which he attacked] a 'fictitious history,' which 'they style the Gospel of Judas.'"

Before the magazine's edition circulated, other news media covered the story, abridging and selectively reporting it.

In December 2007, April DeConick asserted that the National Geographic's translation is badly flawed: "For example, in one instance the National Geographic transcription refers to Judas as a 'daimon,' which the society's experts have translated as 'spirit.' However, the universally accepted word for 'spirit' is 'pneuma' – in Gnostic literature "daimon" is always taken to mean 'demon.'" The National Geographic Society responded that "Virtually all issues April D. DeConick raises about translation choices are addressed in footnotes in both the popular and critical editions." In a later review of the issues and relevant publications, critic Joan Acocella questioned whether ulterior intentions had not begun to supersede historical analysis, e.g., whether publication of The Gospel of Judas could be an attempt to roll back ancient anti-semitic imputations. She concluded that the ongoing clash between scriptural fundamentalism and attempts at revision was childish because the sources were unreliable. Therefore, she argued, "People interpret, and cheat. The answer is not to fix the Bible but to fix ourselves." Other scholars have questioned the initial translation and interpretation of the Gospel of Judas by the National Geographic team of experts.

=== Gospel of Barnabas ===
According to the Gospel of Barnabas, a late medieval pseudepigraphical gospel, it was Judas, not Jesus, who was crucified on the cross. This work states that when Judas led the Roman soldiers to arrest Jesus in an effort to betray him, angels appeared to take Jesus out a window and up to the heavens. As Judas entered the room, his appearance was transformed to that of Jesus, and the Romans arrested him and brought him to be crucified. The narrative states that this transformation not only fooled the Romans but also the Pharisees, the High Priest, the followers of Christ, and his mother Mary. The Gospel of Barnabas then mentions that three days after burial, Judas's body was stolen from his grave, with rumors spreading of Jesus being risen from the dead. In Islamic lore, when Jesus was informed in the third heaven about what happened, he prayed to God to be sent back to earth; he later descended, gathered his mother, disciples, and followers, and told them the truth. He then ascended back to the heavens, with the narrative continuing Islamic legend mirroring Christian doctrine of returning at the end of times as a just king.

The Gospel of Barnabas was not written by Barnabas (fl. first century CE). Many of its teachings are synchronous with those in the Quran and oppose the Bible, especially the New Testament. The earliest known mention of the Gospel of Barnabas appears in a 1634 manuscript by a Morisco found in Madrid, and the earliest published reference appears in the 1715 book Menagiana by the French poet Bernard de la Monnoye.

An unrelated "Gospel according to Barnabas" was first mentioned in the sixth-century Gelasian Decree, and was condemned as apocryphal. Another mention of a gospel using his name is in the seventh-century List of the Sixty Books, or the Catalogue of the Sixty Canonical Books. Historians are uncertain whether these refer to this Gospel of Barnabas, since no quotes have been preserved for confirmation. Jomier believes a forger could have taken the title after the publishing of the Gelasian Decree by printing press.

The Gospel of Barnabas is criticized by Muslim scholars, who reject it partially or completely. According to American scholar Amina Inloes, the many differences between the gospel and the Quran dilute its importance. In the January 1977 issue of the Islamic World League journal, Syrian writer Yahya al-Hashimi called it a polemic by a Jew to generate hostility between Christians and Muslims. Al-Hashimi said that there was no need to use apocryphal gospels to prove that Muhammad was a prophet, because he believed Muhammad had been foretold by Jesus as the Paraclete in the Gospel of John. Egyptian literary critic Abbas Mahmoud al-Aqqad cited several reasons to reject the gospel, including the use of Andalusi Arabic phrases and teachings which conflict with the Quran.

== Representations ==
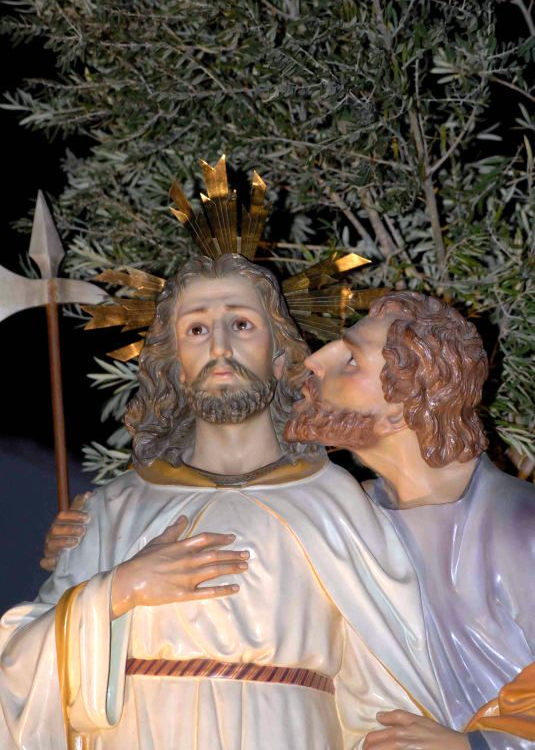
A red-haired Judas betrays Jesus with a kiss in a Spanish paso figure.

Although the sanctification of the instruments of the Passion of Jesus (the so-called Arma Christi), which slowly accrued over the course of the Middle Ages in Christian symbolism and art, also included the head and lips of Judas, The term Judas has entered many languages as a synonym for betrayer, and Judas has become the archetype of the traitor in Western art and literature. Judas plays a role in virtually all literature telling the Passion story and appears in numerous modern novels and movies.

In the Eastern Orthodox hymns of Holy Wednesday (the Wednesday before Pascha), Judas is contrasted with the woman who anointed Jesus with expensive perfume and washed his feet with her tears. The hymns of Holy Wednesday contrast these two figures, encouraging believers to avoid the fallen disciple and instead imitate Mary's example of repentance. Wednesday is also observed as a day of fasting from meat, dairy products, and olive oil throughout the year in memory of Judas's betrayal. The prayers of preparation for receiving the Eucharist also make mention of Judas's betrayal: "I will not reveal your mysteries to your enemies, neither like Judas will I betray you with a kiss, but like the thief on the cross I will confess you."

Judas Iscariot is often shown with red hair in Spanish culture and by William Shakespeare. The practice is comparable to the Renaissance portrayal of Jews with red hair, which was then regarded as a negative trait and which may have been used to correlate Judas Iscariot with contemporary Jews.

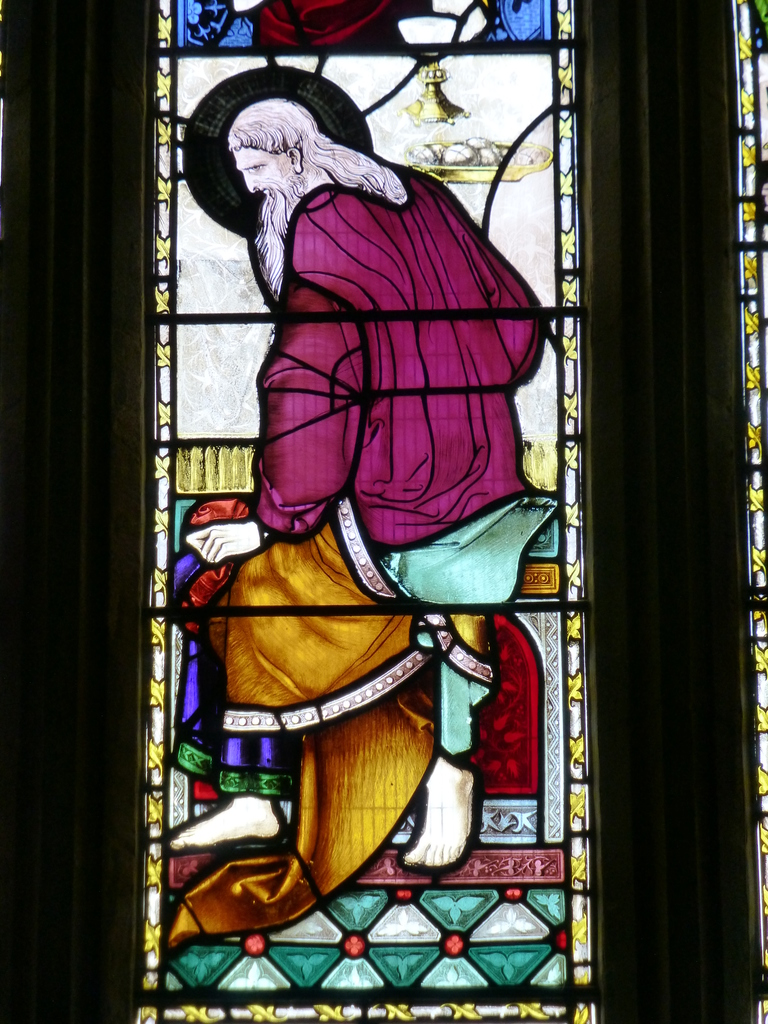
In the Church of St. John the Baptist, Yeovil, one stained glass window depicts Judas with a black halo.

In paintings depicting the Last Supper, Judas is occasionally depicted with a dark-colored halo (contrasting with the lighter halos of the other apostles) to signify his former status as an apostle. More commonly, however, he is the only one at the table without one. Some church stained-glass windows show him with a dark halo such as in one of the windows of the Church of St John the Baptist, Yeovil.

== Art and literature ==
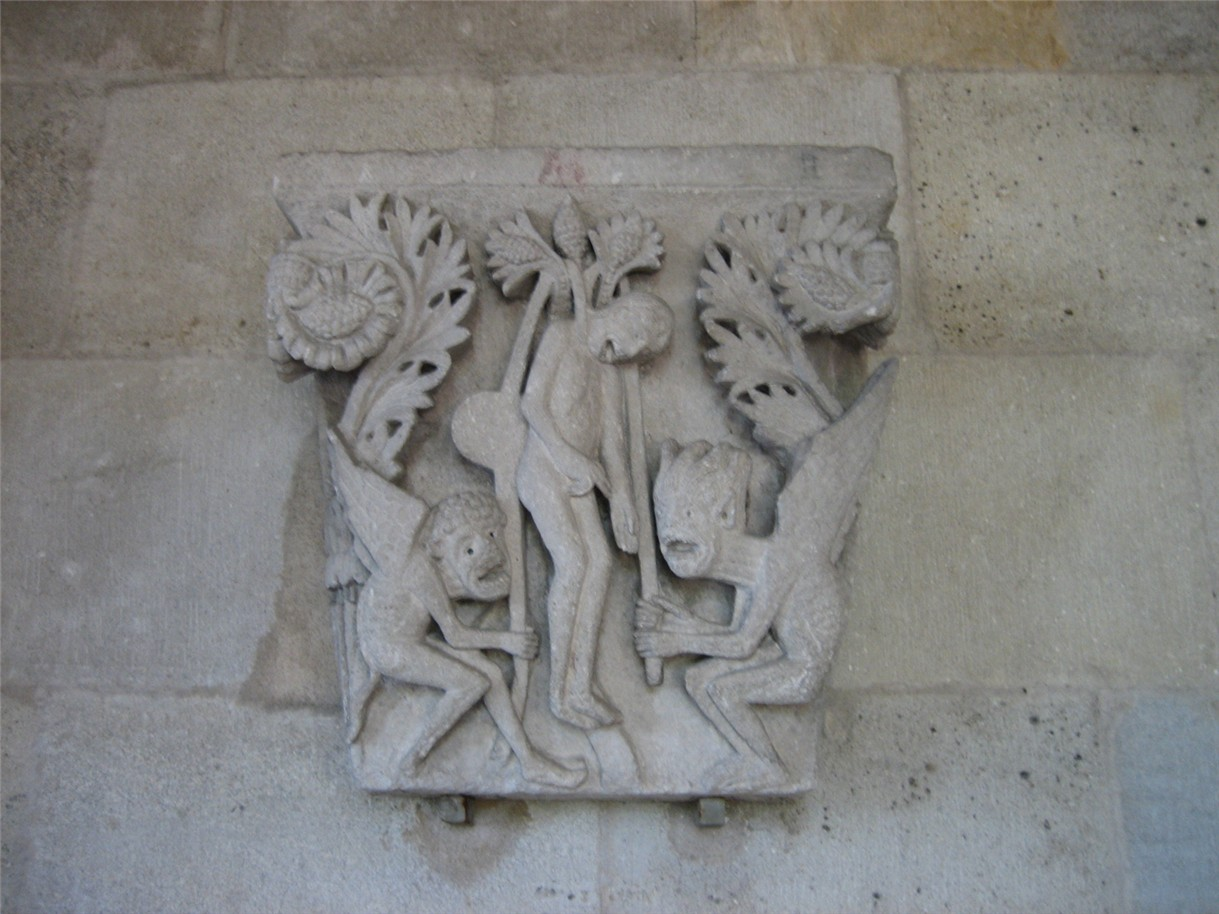
Cathédrale Saint-Lazare, Autun. Judas hangs himself

- Judas is the subject of one of the oldest surviving English ballads, which dates from the thirteenth century. In the ballad Judas, the blame for the betrayal of Christ is placed on Judas's sister.
- One of the most famous depictions of Judas Iscariot and his kiss of betrayal of Jesus is The Taking of Christ by Italian Baroque artist Caravaggio, painted in 1602.
- Edward Elgar's oratorio, The Apostles, depicts Judas as wanting to force Jesus to declare his divinity and establish the kingdom on earth.
- In Trial of Christ in Seven Stages (1909) by John Brayshaw Kaye, the author did not accept the idea that Judas intended to betray Christ, and the poem is a defence of Judas, in which he adds his own vision to the biblical account of the story of the trial before the Sanhedrin and Caiaphas.
- Walter Ferris and Basil Rathbone co-authored the play Judas which was staged on Broadway in 1929 at the Longacre Theatre.
- In Mikhail Bulgakov's novel The Master and Margarita, Judas is paid by the high priest to testify against Jesus, who had been inciting trouble among the people of Jerusalem. After authorizing the crucifixion, Pilate suffers an agony of regret and turns his anger on Judas, ordering him assassinated.
- "Tres versiones de Judas" (English title: "Three Versions of Judas") is a short story by Argentine writer and poet Jorge Luis Borges; it was included in Borges's anthology Ficciones, published in 1944, and revolves around the main character's doubts about the canonical story of Judas who instead creates three alternative versions.
- The rock opera Jesus Christ Superstar, initially released as a 1970 concept album by Tim Rice and Andrew Lloyd Webber, is loosely based on the Gospel Accounts of the Passion with much of the plot centred on Judas, who is dissatisfied with how Jesus steers his disciples.
- In The Last Days of Judas Iscariot (2005), a critically acclaimed play by Stephen Adly Guirgis, Judas is given a trial in Purgatory.
- The Book of Longings by Sue Monk Kidd features Judas as the adopted brother of the fictional protagonist, Ana. Judas is reimagined as a Zealot extremist who only betrays Jesus in the belief that he will resist the authorities and trigger a Judean revolution against Rome.
- The upcoming animated short film Judas Iscariot, directed by Charles Kugler, depicts Judas as an anthropomorphic rabbit, and follows his perspective of the story of Christ, leading up to his betrayal and the crucifixion. The project is slated for a release in 2026.

== See also ==
- Ahitophel
- Burning of Judas
- Judas's Ear mushroom (Auricularia auricula-judae)
- Judas goat
- Judas tree
- List of unsolved deaths
- Valerius Gratus – Roman governor of Judea who appointed Joseph ben Caiaphas to become Jewish High Priest.

== Citations ==
=== General and cited references ===
- Ehrman, Bart D. (1999). Jesus: Apocalyptic Prophet of the New Millennium. Oxford, England: Oxford University Press. ISBN 978-0195124743.
- Ehrman, Bart D. (2016). Jesus Before the Gospels: How the Earliest Christians Remembered, Changed, and Invented their Stories of the Savior. New York City: HarperOne. ISBN 978-0-06-228520-1.
- Gubar, Susan (2009). Judas: A Biography. New York City and London, England: W. W. Norton & Company. ISBN 978-0-393-06483-4.
- Kent, William Henry (1910). "Judas Iscariot" . In Herbermann, Charles (ed.). Catholic Encyclopedia. Vol. 8. New York: Robert Appleton Company.
- Oropeza, B. J. (2012). In the Footsteps of Judas and Other Defectors: Apostasy in the New Testament Communities, Vol. 1: Gospels, Acts, and Johannine Letters. Eugene: Cascade. ISBN 9781610972895.
- Stanford, Peter (2015). Judas: The Most Hated Name in History. Berkeley, California: Counterpoint. ISBN 978-1-61902-750-3.
- Zwiep, Arie W. (2004). Judas and the Choice of Matthias: A Study on Context and Concern of Acts 1:15–26. Wissenschaftliche Untersuchungen zum Neuen Testament 2. Reihe. Vol. 187. Tübingen, Germany: Mohr Siebeck. ISBN 978-3-16-148452-0.
