= Elizabeth Teeter =

American actress

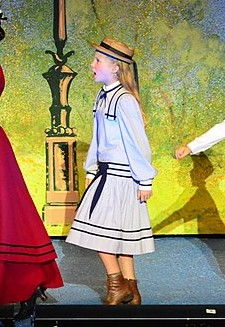
- Teeter in 2013
- Born: 2001 or 2002 (age 24–25)
- Occupation: Actress
- Years active: 2009–present
- Family: Lara Teeter (father)

Elizabeth Teeter (born 2001 or 2002) is an American actress. The daughter of Lara Teeter, she began her career as a child, appearing in several productions at The Muny. She made her Broadway debut in 2012 in Mary Poppins and later played young Elizabeth II in The Audience and Betty Parris in the 2016 revival of The Crucible. Additionally, Teeter starred in the Off-Broadway musical The Secret Life of Bees. From 2022 to 2023, Teeter gained wider recognition for portraying Lydia Deetz in Beetlejuice on Broadway.

== Life and career ==
Elizabeth Teeter was born in 2001 or 2002. Her father, Lara Teeter, is an actor and theatre teacher, while her mother is a dancer and dance teacher. Elizabeth has a twin brother and two younger sisters. As a child, she moved from Chicago to Winchester, Virginia, and later St. Louis. The family lived in Webster Groves, Missouri, where the children attended Bristol Elementary School.

Teeter studied ballet and was coached by her father in acting, singing, and tap dance. Teeter stated that as a child, she and her sisters created many imagination games, and performing "just felt like an extension of my games, but with real people to respond to". She begged her father to take her to see stage performances and later asked to audition, saying that "[s]omething about hearing the downbeat of the orchestra just made me want to cry—and I knew I wanted to be a part of it somehow". She began acting at The Muny at the age of seven, beginning with a 2009 production of Meet Me in St. Louis. In 2011, she performed alongside her father in The Little Mermaid. Additionally, she acted in plays at the Opera Theatre of Saint Louis, the Repertory Theatre of St. Louis, and the New Jewish Theatre. In mid-2012, Teeter was cast in Mary Poppins on Broadway. Her family moved to an apartment in New York from July 2012 to May 2013, during which the children were homeschooled. From August 2012 to March 2013, Teeter alternated with Carly Paige Baron and Maya Jade Frank in the role of Jane Banks. In 2015 and 2016, Teeter played young Elizabeth II in The Audience, sharing the role with Sadie Sink, and Betty Parris in The Crucible, directed by Ivo van Hove, respectively. In a review of the former, Variety said she portrayed the character "very nicely".

Teeter next starred as Lily Owens in the Off-Broadway musical The Secret Life of Bees (2019), based on the film of the same name. She left her penultimate year of high school as a result and completed her schoolwork at the beginning and end of the day. During the show's previews, Teeter took her final examinations: "I would take my final at 10 a.m. and then go in and have a preview rehearsal of the show, and it would be like, 'Oh, we're doing a new opening number today.'" Teeter's performance received positive reviews; the Financial Times described her as the show's "main saving grace", praising her "touchingly nervous yet not without pluck" portrayal of Lily and chemistry with co-star Brett Gray. After graduating high school, Teeter intended to move to New York to attend auditions and classes during a gap semester. In March 2020, Teeter was cast as Lydia Deetz in Beetlejuice. She attended rehearsals for three days before Broadway theatres closed due to the COVID-19 pandemic. The team contacted her two years later and invited her to reaudition. After booking the role again, Teeter worked with the rest of the cast to do table work, discuss characters, work on the screenplay, and contribute new ideas. The production reopened in April 2022 and closed in January 2023. In 2025, Teeter portrayed Heather McNamara in the Off-Broadway revival of Heathers: The Musical at New World Stages. Director Andy Fickman stated that she gave the character "a heartbreaking vulnerability ... that will surprise and move audiences". The production received positive reviews; Mashable praised Teeter's portrayal of McNamara's vulnerability, though Time Out New York said she "doesn't land all her punch lines".

== Credits ==
Elizabeth Teeter's theatre credits
Year	Title	Role	Venue	Notes	Ref.
2009	Meet Me in St. Louis	Tootie Smith	The Muny	Regional	
2010	The Sound of Music	Marta	The Muny	Regional	
2011	Macbeth	Macduff's daughter	The St. Louis Repertory Theater	Regional	
2011	The Little Mermaid	Flounder	The Muny	Regional	
2012–2013	Mary Poppins	Jane Banks	New Amsterdam Theatre	Broadway	
2013	Mary Poppins	Jane Banks	The Muny	Regional	
2015	The Audience	Young Elizabeth	Gerald Schoenfeld Theatre	Broadway	
2016	The Crucible	Betty Parris	Walter Kerr Theatre	Broadway	
2018	Jerome Robbins' Broadway	Wendy	The Muny	Regional	
2019	The Secret Life of Bees	Lily Owens	Linda Gross Theater	Off-Broadway	
2020	The Last O.G.	Symone	—N/a	Episode: "Started from the Bottom"	
2021	The Sound of Music	Liesl von Trapp	The Muny	Regional	
2022–2023	Beetlejuice	Lydia Deetz	Marquis Theatre	Broadway	
2023	The Sound of Music	Liesl von Trapp	The Music Hall	Regional	
2024	13	Kendra	Lawrence Woodmere Academy	Concert	
2025–2026	Heathers: The Musical	Heather McNamara	New World Stages	Off-Broadway	
2026	Something Rotten!	Portia	The Muny	Regional	
2026	The Hairy Ape	Mildred	Irish Repertory Theatre	Off-Broadway	
