= The Book of Longings =

2020 Christian novel by Sue Monk Kidd

- Author: Sue Monk Kidd
- Language: English
- Genre: Christian; Historical fiction
- Publisher: Viking Press
- Publication date: 21 April 2020
- Publication place: United States
- Pages: 448

The Book of Longings is a 2020 Christian novel by American author Sue Monk Kidd, written as a feminist reimagining of the New Testament, published by Viking. It follows a fictionalized Galilean scribe named Ana who becomes the wife of Jesus during the lost years, commenting on the silencing of women across history and literature. It received positive reviews for its respect towards the Biblical material and the characterization of its protagonists. The novel has been translated into 17 languages and a six-part miniseries adaptation was announced in 2023.

== Plot ==
Ana is the daughter of the chief scribe of Herod Antipas and the adoptive sister of Judas, a Zealot agitator. Ana learns to read and write at a young age, collecting and transcribing a personal library on Biblical women. She becomes close friends with her educated paternal aunt Yaltha after she is exiled from Alexandria by Ana's uncle, Haran. Ana is betrothed to a repulsive widower named Nathaniel, but meets Jesus in the market when she is taken for Nathaniel to inspect. Her parents attempt to burn her collection of scrolls, but Ana smuggles them out to bury in a nearby cave, where she chances upon Jesus mourning for Joseph. Ana adds the story of her best friend Tabitha to her collection after Tabitha's father cuts her tongue out for publicly accusing a rapist.

Judas attacks Nathaniel but is captured by Antipas and disowned by their father. Ana befriends Antipas' neglected wife Phasaelis at the celebratory feast. Antipas is struck by Ana's beauty and has her sit for a mosaic, which she uses to negotiate Judas' release. Nathaniel dies, releasing Ana from the betrothal but rendering her unmarriable as a widow. Her father offers her to Antipas as a concubine but she runs off and is accused of adultery by an angry crowd outside the palace. Jesus saves her from being stoned, declaring himself her betrothed in Nathaniel's place. Ana's father meekly accepts Jesus' petition, allowing Ana and Yaltha passage to Nazareth.

Ana befriends Mary, herself suspected of adultery, but Ana is unaccustomed to peasant life and can no longer afford her papyrus and inks. Traveling to the Temple for Passover they discover an injured Tabitha and carry her to Lazarus, Martha, and Mary of Bethany with the help of the Good Samaritan.

Jesus meets Andrew, Simon, and John while fishing abroad. Ana falls pregnant but miscarries, rediscovering her writing as an outlet for her grief. Yaltha also reveals she left a baby daughter named Chaya in Alexandria and hopes to return to find her. Judas befriends Jesus as a fellow revolutionary, though they disagree on the use of force against Rome. He also brings news of Antipas marrying Herodias to try and claim the title of King of the Jews, and Ana writes to Phasaelis to warn she may be assassinated to make way. Jesus and Ana follow tales of John the Immerser to the Jordan, where God reveals himself to Jesus as his father and Jesus joins the other Disciples. Ana receives word that both her parents are dead and Phisaelis has escaped, but that Herodias has discovered her letter, forcing her to leave for Alexandria with Yaltha when Haran sends a treasurer to handle the estate.

Haran offers Ana lodgings in return for work as a scribe, but he forbids them from leaving his palace or seeking out Chaya. Ana nonetheless uses her access to his study to discover he sold her to the priests of Isis under the name of Diodora. She also receives word of the beheading of John the Immerser, which leaves Jesus to begin his ministry openly. They sneak out to the Temple of Isis while Haran is away and introduce themselves to Diodora, who initially rejects them. She returns to their palace the next day, only to be discovered by Haran. He locks up Yaltha and Ana, but they escape and find refuge at the Therapeutae, the Gnostic commune where Yaltha first learned to read and write.

Ana is praised for her work after she composes and performs The Thunder: Perfect Mind for a feast. They reconcile with Diodora, though Haran continues to post guards to catch Ana and Yaltha without violating the Therapeutae's sovereignty. She receives a letter from Judas, who is disillusioned with Jesus' pacifism and warns he will go to any lengths to incite a revolution next Passover. Ana sneaks past Haran's soldiers by hiding in a coffin but is badly delayed in the journey to Galilee, arriving at Bethany Passover night. She finds Judas mad with guilt in Gethsemane the next morning, explaining he had expected Jesus to resist arrest and force the disciples to take up arms. Ana finds Jesus during the passion, but is powerless to stop the crucifixion. She joins the other women in mourning and embalming him after John confirms Judas' suicide.

Tabitha, now capable of speaking and singing with the remnants of her tongue, travels with Ana back to the Therapeutae, where Ana experiences a vision of Jesus proclaiming his immortality. She hears of the nascent cult of Christ spreading across the Roman Empire, but is disappointed to find the stories describe Jesus as unmarried. As an old woman she inherits leadership of the Therapeutae and buries copies of her writings in a hill to ensure she will not be silenced by men after her death.

== Writing ==
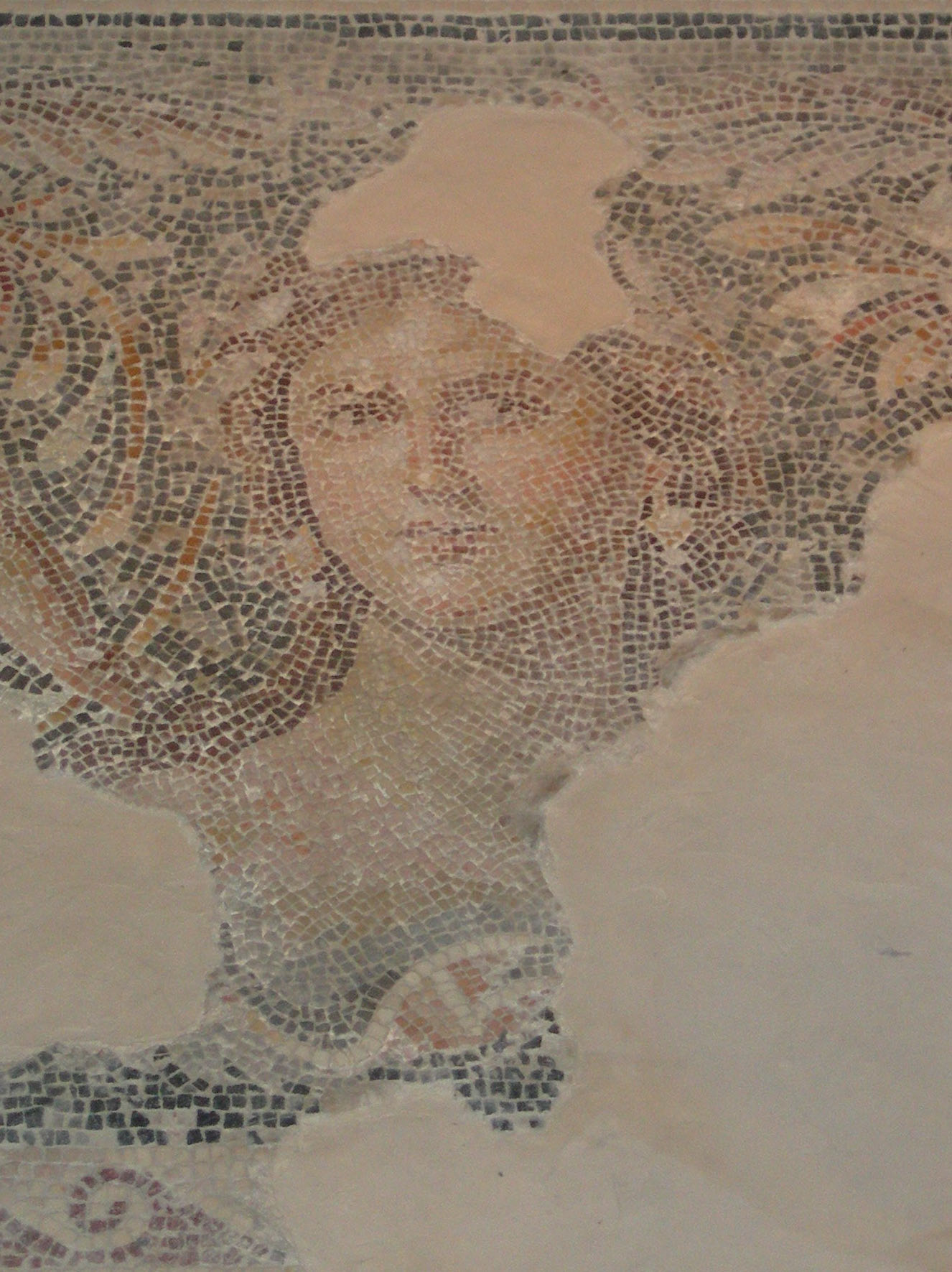
A mosaic known as the "Mona Lisa of the Galilee", which Kidd used as the basis of Ana's appearance.

Kidd was inspired to consider the idea of a wife of Jesus by a Biblical hoax featured on National Geographic, explaining that "my imagination was ignited. I thought, if Jesus' wife ever existed, she would be the most silenced woman in Western history". The first 14 months of the writing process were taken up by extensive research on the period and setting, including Kidd's own travel notes on Egypt, Israel, and Jordan.

Kidd formulated and wrote much of the novel in North Carolina in place of her home state of Georgia. The book was published by Viking Press on April 21, 2020. It has been translated into 17 languages as of 2023.

== Themes and analysis ==
The sexuality and marital status of Jesus is a matter of some contention and speculation. He is traditionally taken to have lived a celibate life free from sins such as lust, though the Gospels and New Testament do not directly deny the possibility of his taking a wife or lover. The concept had been previously explored in fiction, and some have argued that a marriage would have been implied by omission due to the problematic legal status of unmarried men at the time. Kidd's fictionalization of Jesus is initially betrothed to a Nazarene named Judith, but calls off the marriage in the belief he is destined for celibacy as a preacher. He is later forced to separate from Ana due to John the Immerser following traditional Jewish provisions against female priesthood.

Jungian motifs and feminist theology are prevalent throughout Kidd's work, who previously explored feminine divinity through the Black Madonna worshiped in The Secret Life of Bees. Ana is pushed to rebel against the patriarchal structure of existing Jewish religion by both Jesus and her Therapeutaean aunt, eventually coming to worship Sophia, or Wisdom, as a feminine person or aspect of the Judeo-Christian God. The Gnostic women declare her to be the "Daughter of Sophia", mirroring Jesus's own divinity as the Son of God, while her use of a coffin to sneak out of the precinct is argued to foreshadow the resurrection directly.

== Reception ==
April Austin of the Christian Science Monitor praised the book with its human characterization of both Ana and Jesus, but noted Jesus' miracles are almost entirely avoided to maintain focus on the historical Jesus, writing "Kidd's research into first-century Jewish life, along with her vivid descriptions of the villages and terrain, make Ana's story come alive." D.G. Martin wrote "Whether Kidd's readers are true believers or skeptical inquirers, The Book of Longings will be an enriching and challenging read." Diane Scharper of the National Catholic Reporter praised the novel for its factual accuracy and anti-misogynist message. Ron Charles of the Washington Post described Ana as "so woke", but criticized her as a flat and underdeveloped character.

== Adaptation ==
The German Sony House Pictures has confirmed work on an English-language TV miniseries adaptation with founder Andreas Gutzeit as showrunner, alongside a multinational team of writers including Swantje Oppermann, in the wake of Gutzeit's successful tenure on Sisi. Gutzeit argued for the plausibility of Jesus having a wife, crediting Kidd's narrative as a result of "double historical deduction", and advertised casting as "authentic" to the time period in place of "those old sandal flics with white American stars". Sites across Morocco, Tunisia, Jordan and Southern Spain are being considered for location shooting. Gutzeit summarized the project as "a story where two people realize what is wrong, what is right, how love can save people and that's the heart of it. And they've experienced exactly that".
