= Lara Teeter =

American dancer, actor, singer, theater director and professor

- Born: February 3, 1955 (age 71); Guthrie, Oklahoma, United States
- Occupations: Dancer, actor, singer, theater director, college professor
- Years active: 1980–present
- Spouse: Kristen Teeter (m. 1998)
- Children: 4, including Elizabeth

Lara Teeter (born February 3, 1955) is an American dancer, actor, singer, theater director and college professor.

== Biography ==
Born in Guthrie, Oklahoma, Teeter earned his Bachelor of Arts degree from Oklahoma City University.

He made his Broadway debut in the short-lived 1980 musical Happy New Year, followed by another short-lived musical, the stage adaptation of Seven Brides for Seven Brothers, which ran on Broadway in 1982 for five performances.

For his third stage effort, the 1983 revival of On Your Toes he won critical recognition and a Tony Award nomination for Best Featured Actor in a Musical, as "The Hoofer" and "Junior", originally played by Ray Bolger in 1936. He also won the 1983 Outer Critics Circle Award for Outstanding Debut Performance. The show ran for 505 performances.

Additional Broadway credits include The Best Little Whorehouse in Texas and The Pirates of Penzance (chorus). Off-Broadway and national touring credits include the Scarecrow in The Wizard of Oz (in 1998), The Robber Bridegroom, She Loves Me as Kodaly in 1987 at the Ahmanson Theatre, My Fair Lady as Henry Higgins at the North Shore Music Theatre (Beverly, Massachusetts) in 1999, Little Shop of Horrors, Follies in 2005 as "Buddy" and Oklahoma! (national tour).

He appeared with the New York City Opera in Naughty Marietta in 1979 as "Private Silas Slick" and The Most Happy Fella at Lincoln Center in 1991 as "Herman".

He performed in many productions at St. Louis Municipal Opera Theatre, commonly called The Muny, in St. Louis, Missouri, including "Scuttle" in The Little Mermaid, with his daughter Elizabeth playing "Flounder" in 2011. Teeter commented "At Webster, I teach it. At the Muny, I do it..." He performed the role of Don in Singin' in the Rain at the Muny in 1995.

He made his Carnegie Hall debut in 2000 portraying Henry Higgins in a tribute to the work of Lerner and Loewe and his Lyric Opera of Chicago debut in 2001 performing the role of Steve Sankey in Street Scene.

His regional directing credits include My Fair Lady (Opera Pacific) in 1989, The Pirates of Penzance, at both the San Bernardino Civic Light Opera and the Light Opera Works of Chicago (in 2002), Jacques Brel is Alive and Well and Living in Paris (Hollywood Cinegrill) and The Best Little Whorehouse in Texas (Fullerton Civic Light Opera) in 1994.

Teeter was the artistic director of Light Opera Works (Evanston, Illinois), starting in August 1999, and directed many shows there, starting with the Gilbert & Sullivan operetta The Gondoliers in May 2000 and including Ragtime (Light Opera Works of Chicago) in 2003 and Candide (Light Opera Works of Chicago) in 2004.

=== Teaching ===
Teeter's academic credits include positions at California State University, Fullerton, where he helped start the pilot program for a BFA in Musical Theatre and was an associate professor with the theatre and dance department. He held positions at Northwestern University and Shenandoah University. Since 2007 he has been a faculty member at The Conservatory of Theatre Arts at Webster University in St. Louis, Missouri, where he now serves as an associate professor of theatre and head of musical theatre.

== Select recordings ==
Teeter's recordings include On Your Toes (Broadway Revival Cast, 1983), Lady, Be Good! (Studio Cast, Roxbury Recordings, 1992), The Musicality of Rodgers & Hart (Compilation, 1997) and The Wizard of Oz (Original New York Cast, 1998 Grammy nomination).

- On Your Toes (1983)
- Lady Be Good (1992)
- The Wizard of Oz (Grammy Award nominated) (1998)

== Personal ==
Teeter and his wife, Kristen, a dancer and teacher of jazz and contemporary dance classes, married at a Sonoma Valley winery in 1998. Cast members from the tour of The Wizard of Oz attended. They celebrated their 15th wedding anniversary in 2013. They have four children.
