= Alex Carter (Canadian actor) =

Canadian television and film actor

- Born: Toronto, Ontario, Canada
- Occupation: Actor
- Years active: 1988–present

Alex Carter is a Canadian television and film actor.

== Early and personal life ==
Carter was born in Toronto, Ontario and grew up in Scarborough, Ontario. He lives in California.

== Career ==
Carter's television roles have included roles on roles in Family Passions, Black Harbour, Traders, Made in Canada, Taking the Falls, The Pretender, These Arms of Mine, Flashpoint, Wildfire, Castle, Life, Without a Trace, Nip/Tuck, The Mermaid Chair, The Practice, Shark, Due South, CSI: NY, Leverage, JAG, Veritas: The Quest and Jericho, as well as recurring roles in CSI: Crime Scene Investigation as LVPD Homicide Detective Lou Vartann (32 episodes), Revenge as Michael Davis, Point Pleasant (9 episodes), and Burn Notice as Agent Jason Bly (6 episodes). He had a role in a few of the final scenes of the series finale of 24. His film roles have included Out of Time and The Island.

== Filmography ==
=== Film ===
Alex Carter film credits
Year	Title	Role	Notes
1997	Time to Say Goodbye?	Craig Klooster	
2000	Bring Him Home	Farrell	
2001	It Is What It Is	Mitch Valentine	
2003	Out of Time	Paul Cabot	
2005	The Island	Censor	
2012	40 Days and Nights	John	
2017	Don't Sleep	Vince Marino	

=== Television ===
Alex Carter television credits
Year	Title	Role	Notes
1988	Betrayal of Silence	Michael	TV movie
1989	Friday the 13th: The Series	Police Officer	Episode: "The Playhouse"
1989, 1990	War of the Worlds	Clark / Alien #2 / Record Company Guy #2	Episodes: "Choirs of Angels" (1989), "Video Messiah" (1990)
1990, 1991	My Secret Identity	Methey	Episodes: "Missing" (1990), "Three Men and a Skull" (1991)
1990, 1992	Top Cops	Greg Smith / Bruno Pezzulich	Episodes: "Vincent Esposito / Greg Smith" (1990), "Freddie Williams / Jim Gorry / Bruno Pezzulich" (1992)
1991	Street Legal	Dean James	Episode: "Too Many Cooks"
1991	Katts and Dog (Rin Tin Tin: K-9 Cop)	Unknown	Episode: "Big Man on Campus"
1992	Secret Service	Agent / Romano	Episodes: "The Stalker / Bomb Protective Mission", "The Banker and the Belle / Car Wars"
1993	Counterstrike	Ron Waters	Episode: "Clear Cut"
1993	Taking the Heat	Muff	TV movie
1993	Family Passions	Mickey Langer #2	
1994	Spenser: Pale Kings and Princes	Lundquist	TV movie
1994	E.N.G.	Gary Belson	Episode: "The Play's the Thing"
1994	To Save the Children	FBI 1	TV movie
1994–1995	Side Effects	Richard Malichevski	Recurring role (4 episodes)
1994, 1996	Kung Fu: The Legend Continues	Parks	Episodes: "Only the Strong Survive" (1994), "Requiem" (1996)
1994–1998	Due South	Agent Ford	Recurring role (5 episodes)
1995	The Man in the Attic	Gary	TV movie
1995	Net Worth	Gus Mortson	TV movie
1996	Moonshine Highway	Bill Rickman	TV movie
1996	Her Desperate Choice	Marcus Perry, Jody's ex-boyfriend	TV movie
1996	Talk to Me	Mark Holston	TV movie
1996	Trilogy of Terror II	Breslow	TV movie
1996	The Morrison Murders: Based on a True Story	Deputy George Pettygrew	TV movie
1996	What Kind of Mother Are You?	Rob Hyler	TV movie
1996	Taking the Falls	Domenic DiFranco	Episode: "The Marrying Man"
1996–1997	Traders	Tommy "Ryke" Rykespoor	Recurring role (8 episodes)
1996–1998	Black Harbour	Paul Isler	Series regular (30 episodes)
1997	F/X: The Series	Bobby	Episode: "Requiem for a Cop"
1998	The Fixer	Howard Larkin	TV movie
1998	Recipe for Revenge	Jack Branningan	TV movie
1998–2002	Made in Canada	Michael Rushton / Damacles	Recurring role (6 episodes)
1999	Martial Law	Vincent McKnight	Episode: "Wild Life"
1999	Viper	Phil Dykstra / Dennis Pratt	Episode: "People Like Us"
1999	The Sentinel	Alan Archer	Episode: "Dead End on Blank Street"
1999	The Pretender	Craig Winston	Episode: "Ties That Bind"
1999	Early Edition	Victor Crowley	Episode: "Camera Shy"
1999–2001	These Arms of Mine	David Bishop	Recurring role (5 episodes)
1999, 2003	JAG	Commander Mark Joyner / Commander Thomas Risnicki	Episodes: "War Stories" (1999), "Close Quarters" (2003)
2000	Felicity	Stephen's father	Episode: "Party Lines"
2000	Task Force	Brian Hogan	TV movie
2001	Dark Angel	Sidney Croal – Synthedyne CEO	Episode: "Shorties in Love"
2001	V.I.P.	Lagos	Episode: "Aqua Valva"
2001	Hitched	Detective Cary Grant	TV movie
2001	Earth: Final Conflict	Keeler	Episode: "Unearthed"
2001	The Day Reagan Was Shot	Dr. Allard	TV movie
2001	Blue Murder	Special Agent Wayne "Flip" Henderson	Episode: "Remembrance Day"
2002	Guilt by Association	Russell	TV movie
2003	Nip/Tuck	Cliff Mangegna	Episode: "Cliff Mantegna"
2003	The Practice	John Doe / Russell Fosterling	Episode: "Blessed Are They"
2003–2004	Veritas: The Quest	Dr. Solomon Zond	Series regular (13 episodes)
2003–2013	CSI: Crime Scene Investigation	Detective Vartann	Recurring role (41 episodes)
2005	Night Stalker	Detective Granof	Episode: "The Five People You Meet in Hell"
2005	Bones	Dr. Andrew Rigby	Episode: "The Man in the Bear"
2005–2006	Point Pleasant	Sheriff Logan Parker	Recurring role (9 episodes)
2006	E-Ring	General Ian Maguire	Episode: "The General"
2006	The Mermaid Chair	Brother "Whit" Thomas	TV movie
2006	Jericho	Fire Chief	Episode: "Pilot"
2007	Without a Trace	Allen Crane	Episode: "Deep Water"
2007	Wildfire	Tim	Recurring role (4 episodes)
2007	The Dead Zone	Captain Steve Wilcox	Episode: "Re-Entry"
2007	Shark	Alan Boyd	Episodes: "In the Crosshairs", "Every Breath You Take"
2007–2008	Lincoln Heights	Lieutenant Lindo	Recurring role (10 episodes)
2007–2012	Burn Notice	Jason Bly	Recurring role (6 episodes)
2008	Life	Alex Lauer	Episode: "Badge Bunny"
2008	The Tower	District Attorney	TV movie
2009	Leverage	Sterling's Henchman	Episodes: "The First David Job", "The Second David Job"
2009	Terminator: The Sarah Connor Chronicles	Ko Samules	Episode: "Ourselves Alone"
2009	Castle	Michael Goldman	Episode: "Ghosts"
2009	Ghost Whisperer	Dale Harmon	Episode: "Birthday Presence"
2009	Flashpoint	Robert cooper	Episode: "The Good Citizen"
2010	24	Nantz	Episode: "Day 8: 3:00 p.m.-4:00 p.m."
2011	Haven	Mr. Campbell	Episode: "Who, What, Where, Wendigo?"
2011	Look Again	Stafford Keach	TV movie
2011	The Whole Truth	Donal Byrne	Episode: "Perfect Witness"
2011–2012	Revenge	Michael Davis	Episodes: "Betrayal", "Legacy"
2012	Rizzoli & Isles	Ron Montgomery	Episode: "Welcome to the Dollhouse"
2012	CSI: NY	Nathan Lewis	Episode: "Misconceptions"
2012	Beauty and the Beast	Zachary Holt	Episode: "Basic Instinct"
2013	House of Versace	Paul Beck	TV movie
2013	Missing at 17	Kurt	TV movie
2013	Nikita	Matthew Graham	Episodes: "Wanted", "Dead or Alive"
2014	The Secret Sex Life of a Single Mom	The Duke	TV movie
2014	Perception	Dr. Carter Humphries	Episode: "Eternity"
2014	Stalker	Kenneth Brown	Episode: "Love Is a Battlefield"
2014	NCIS: Los Angeles	Frank Kouris	Episode: "Leipei"
2014	Major Crimes	Ronald Glover	Episode: "Down the Drain"
2015	Chasing Life	Chef Quincy	Episode: "Cancer Friends with Benefits"
2015	Backstrom	Jim Klassen	Episode: "Enemy of My Enemies"
2015	Battle Creek	NSA Agent	Episode: "The Hand-Off"
2015	Jesse Stone: Lost in Paradise	Detective Dan Leary	TV movie
2016	Saving Hope	Davey Law	Episode: "You Can't Always Get What You Want"
2016	Recovery Road	Dr. Marcus Granger	Recurring role (3 episodes)
2016	Blue Bloods	Special Agent Alexander Clune	Episode: "Down the Rabbit Hole"
2016	The Last Ship	General Bradley	Episode: "Resistance"
2017	Ransom	Yannis Kalvos	Episode: "The Return"
2017	NCIS	Knox Ellicott	Episode: "Pandora's Box, Part I"
2017	Ghost Wars	Burke	Episode: "The Curse of Copperhead Road"
2017	Jean-Claude Van Johnson	Colonel	Episodes: "If You're Lucky", "The World Needs Its Hero"
2018	The X-Files	Chief Strong	Episode: "Familiar"
2018	The Detail	Superintendent Andrew Currie	Episode: "When One Door Closes"
2018	S.W.A.T.	Hawkins	Episode: "Hunted"
2018–2019	Burden of Truth	David Hanley	Recurring role (11 episodes)
2019	Bull	James Weeks	Episode: "Prior Bad Acts"
2020	9-1-1: Lone Star	Captain	Episode: "Pilot"
2020	Stumptown	Freddie	Episode: "At All Costs: The Conrad Costas Chronicles"
2021	Magnum P.I.	Henry Sellers	Episode: "Bloodline"
2023	Quantum Leap	Captain Bill Drake	Episode: "S.O.S."
