= Taking the Falls =

Canadian television series

- Genre: Comedy drama
- Directed by: Michael Kennedy
- Starring: Cynthia Dale; Sandra Nelson; Alex Carter
- Country of origin: Canada
- Original language: English
- No. of seasons: 1
- No. of episodes: 13

Production
- Production company: Alliance Communications

Original release
- Network: CTV
- Release: September 1, 1995 – February 1, 1996

Taking the Falls was a Canadian dramedy series, which aired on CTV in the 1995-96 television season.

The show starred Cynthia Dale as Terry Lane, a former police officer turned private investigator in Niagara Falls who solved crimes with the help of her lawyer friend Katherine MacVicar (Sandra Nelson). The cast also included Alex Carter and Michael Copeman as police associates of Lane's.

Dale's sister Jennifer Dale also appeared in one episode of the show as Gloria, a flaky psychic. The show was not renewed for a second season.
