= Susan Birkenhead =

American lyricist

- Origin: United States
- Occupation: Lyricist
- Years active: 1978–present

Susan Birkenhead is an American lyricist.

Birkenhead made her Broadway debut as one of a team of songwriters contributing to Working (1978), for which she received her first Tony Award nomination. Her second was earned for Jelly's Last Jam (1992), which won her the Drama Desk Award for Outstanding Lyrics and a Grammy Award nomination. Additional Broadway credits include Triumph of Love (Drama Desk nomination) and additional lyrics for the Cole Porter tunes in the 1998 revival of High Society.

Birkenhead's Off-Broadway and regional theatre credits include What About Luv?, a musical adaptation of the Murray Schisgal play Luv, for which she won the Outer Critics Circle Award; Pieces of Eight with Jule Styne and Michael Stewart; Fanny Hackabout Jones with Erica Jong and Lucy Simon; The Night They Raided Minsky's with Charles Strouse and Evan Hunter, the new musical Minsky's based on the same; and, in collaboration with Henry Krieger, two potentially Broadway-bound projects based on hit films, The Flamingo Kid and Moonstruck (with a book by screenwriter John Patrick Shanley).

Birkenhead is one of several lyricists who contributed to Hats!, a musical inspired by the Red Hat Society, which is enjoying an open-ended run at Harrah's New Orleans, after premiering at the New Denver Civic Theatre. The musical had a limited engagement at the Royal George Theatre in Chicago starting in April 2007.

Radio Girl, a musical based on Kate Douglas Wiggin's Rebecca of Sunnybrook Farm, premiered at the Goodspeed Musicals' Norma Terrace Theatre with music by Henry Krieger, lyrics by Birkenhead, and a book by Daniel Goldfarb. The show ran in 2010 from July 29 to August 22.

She also wrote the lyrics for the musical version of Sue Monk Kidd's The Secret Life of Bees, with music by Duncan Sheik and a book by Lynn Nottage. It premiered at the Off-Broadway Atlantic Theater Company on May 12, 2019, which was followed by a London production in 2023.

== Awards and nominations ==
Year	Award	Category	Work	Result
1978	Tony Award	Best Original Score	Working	Nominated
1992	Tony Award	Best Original Score	Jelly's Last Jam	Nominated
1992	Drama Desk Award	Outstanding Lyrics	Jelly's Last Jam	Nominated
1998	Drama Desk Award	Outstanding Lyrics	Triumph of Love	Nominated
2020	Outer Critics Circle Award	Outstanding Book of a Musical	The Secret Life of Bees	Honored
2025	Outer Critics Circle Award	Outstanding Book of a Musical	Boop! The Musical	Nominated
