= Black Harbour =

- Starring: Rebecca Jenkins; Geraint Wyn Davies; Alex Carter; Joseph Ziegler
- Theme music composer: Eric Robertson
- Country of origin: Canada
- Original language: English
- No. of series: 3
- No. of episodes: 39

Production
- Running time: 45 min? (1 hr slot)

Original release
- Network: CBC
- Release: 4 December 1996 – 5 February 1999

Black Harbour is a Canadian television series, which ran on CBC Television from 1996 to 1999.

The show starred Rebecca Jenkins as Katherine Hubbard, a successful restaurant owner who returned to live in her Nova Scotia hometown to be with her mother who had suffered a heart attack. Her husband Geraint Wyn Davies, followed her with their two kids. Alex Carter also starred as Hubbard's high school sweetheart Paul Isler, whose own marriage was on the rocks and who was employed by Katherine's brother at the boatyard.

In the show's final season, Hubbard and Isler's marriages had both failed, and they officially rekindled their old relationship.

== Cast ==
- Rebecca Jenkins as Katherine Hubbard
- Alex Carter as Paul Isler
- Joseph Ziegler as Len Hubbard
- Geraint Wyn Davies as Nick Haskell

== Episodes ==
=== Season 1: 1996–97 ===
No. overall	No. in season	Title	Directed by	Written by	Original release date
1	1	"Home and Away"	Unknown	Unknown	December 4, 1996
2	2	"The Rocks and the Sea"	Unknown	Unknown	December 11, 1996
3	3	"Best-Laid Plans"	Unknown	Unknown	December 18, 1996
4	4	"A Rock and a Hard Place"	Unknown	Unknown	January 8, 1997
5	5	"Time and Tide"	Unknown	Unknown	January 15, 1997
6	6	"Ancient History"	Unknown	Unknown	January 22, 1997
7	7	"Into Darkness"	Unknown	Unknown	January 29, 1997
8	8	"Turnaround"	Unknown	Unknown	February 5, 1997
9	9	"Dead of Winter"	Unknown	Unknown	February 12, 1997
10	10	"Brush Fires"	Unknown	Unknown	February 19, 1997
11	11	"You Can't Get There From Here"	Unknown	Unknown	February 26, 1997
12	12	"Fire and Water"	Unknown	Unknown	March 5, 1997
13	13	"The Water is Wide"	Unknown	Unknown	March 12, 1997

=== Season 2: 1997–98 ===
No. overall	No. in season	Title	Directed by	Written by	Original release date
14	1	"Birth of a Notion"	Unknown	Unknown	October 22, 1997
15	2	"Dead Calm"	Unknown	Unknown	October 29, 1997
16	3	"The Wall"	Unknown	Unknown	November 5, 1997
17	4	"The Legacy"	Unknown	Unknown	November 12, 1997
18	5	"Another Country"	Unknown	Unknown	November 19, 1997
19	6	"A Family Affair"	Unknown	Unknown	November 26, 1997
20	7	"Love's Labours Lost"	Unknown	Unknown	December 3, 1997
21	8	"High Noon"	Unknown	Unknown	December 10, 1997
22	9	"A Separate Peace"	Unknown	Unknown	December 17, 1997
23	10	"Tooth & Nail"	Unknown	Unknown	January 7, 1998
24	11	"Man in the Middle"	Unknown	Unknown	January 14, 1998
25	12	"Devil and the Deep Blue Sea"	Unknown	Unknown	January 21, 1998
26	13	"The Sleep of Reason"	Unknown	Unknown	January 28, 1998

=== Season 3: 1998–99 ===
No. overall	No. in season	Title	Directed by	Written by	Original release date
27	1	"Descent"	Unknown	Unknown	October 9, 1998
28	2	"Mr. Sensitivity"	Unknown	Unknown	October 16, 1998
29	3	"And Nothing But the Truth"	Unknown	Unknown	October 23, 1998
30	4	"Eye of the Storm"	Unknown	Unknown	October 30, 1998
31	5	"Undertow"	Unknown	Unknown	November 6, 1998
32	6	"Bolt from the Blue"	Unknown	Unknown	November 13, 1998
33	7	"Field of Dreams"	Unknown	Unknown	November 20, 1998
34	8	"Aftershocks"	Unknown	Unknown	November 27, 1998
35	9	"Surfacing"	Unknown	Unknown	January 8, 1999
36	10	"Smoke"	Unknown	Unknown	January 15, 1999
37	11	"Wait for Spring"	Unknown	Unknown	January 22, 1999
38	12	"Home Sweet Home"	Unknown	Unknown	January 29, 1999
39	13	"Artichoke Pie"	Unknown	Unknown	February 5, 1999
