= Veritas: The Quest =

2003 American TV series

- Genre: Adventure
- Created by: Patrick Massett; John Zinman
- Starring: Alex Carter; Ryan Merriman; Cobie Smulders; Eric Balfour; Cynthia Martells; Arnold Vosloo
- Composer: John Nordstrom
- Country of origin: United States
- Original language: English
- No. of seasons: 1
- No. of episodes: 13

Production
- Executive producers: Patrick Massett; Neil Meron; Craig Zadan; John Zinman
- Producers: Iain Paterson; I.C. Rapoport
- Running time: 60 minutes
- Production companies: Massett/Zinman Productions; Storyline Entertainment; Touchstone Television

Original release
- Network: ABC
- Release: January 27 – March 10, 2003

Veritas: The Quest is an American television series that aired in 2003, following a rebellious but intelligent teenager, Nikko Zond, as he discovers that his father Solomon's profession is much more mystical and adventurous than he previously thought. Solomon and his team (dubbed "Veritas," Latin for "truth") search for the answers to some of the world's mysteries, a quest began because of the mysterious disappearance of Nikko's mother during an archaeological dig. Thus begins Nikko's fantastical journey into an Indiana Jones-style adventure with his father and his colleagues in trying to follow in his mother's footsteps to discover what strange secrets she was uncovering. The series was cancelled in the United States by ABC with only four episodes being aired. All thirteen produced episodes aired on Sci Fi Channel in the United Kingdom, on Rai 2 and Rai 4 in Italy, and Canal Sony (formerly known as Sony Entertainment Television).

This was the first program where Cobie Smulders had a series regular role, and notable guest stars included Liz Vassey, Carlo Rota, Roger Rees, and Eli Wallach.

== Plot ==
The main protagonist of the series is Nikko Zond, a young teen whose father goes on numerous archaeological expeditions to places ranging from Antarctica to harsh deserts. Nikko is at first reluctant to participate in many of the adventures, but throughout the series, it would appear that there is a hidden destiny for Nikko.

In the episode "Skulls", a mysterious figure, whom only Nikko can see, appears out of nowhere and guides him. The episode ends with a plot twist involving a crystal skull.

In the episode "Eternal", Nikko is poisoned, and the only cure involves drink water that heals and promises eternal life.

In the final episode, Nikko has hallucinations that lead him to find a fragment of an artifact called the "Ring of Truth". He eventually discovers that this connects with another fragment, which his father acquired earlier in the series.

== Cast and characters ==
- Alex Carter as Dr. Solomon Zond
- Ryan Merriman as Nikko Zond
- Cobie Smulders as Juliet Droil
- Eric Balfour as Calvin Banks
- Cynthia Martells as Maggie Hayes
- Arnold Vosloo as Vincent Siminou

== Episodes ==
No.	Title	Directed by	Written by	Original release date	U.S. viewers (millions)
1	"Reunion"	Bryan Spicer	Patrick Massett & John Zinman	January 27, 2003	9.12
2	"Antarctica"	Perry Lang	Patrick Massett & John Zinman	February 3, 2003	7.21
3	"Skulls"	Adam Nimoy	Patrick Massett & John Zinman	February 10, 2003	6.51
4	"Heist"	Rick Kolbe	Rick Kellard	March 10, 2003	5.54
5	"The Wheel Of Dharma"	R. W. Goodwin	Stephanie Bloch-Chambers & Julie Bean	Unaired	TBD
6	"Sangraal"	Perry Lang	Gabrielle Stanton & Harry Werksman, Jr.	Unaired	TBD
7	"Mummy Virus"	Vern Gillum	Rick Kellard & Thania St. John	Unaired	TBD
8	"Name Of God"	Michael Nankin	Brad Falchuk	Unaired	TBD
9	"Devil's Child"	Thomas J. Wright	Thania St. John	Unaired	TBD
10	"Avalon"	Dwight Little	I. C. Rapoport	Unaired	TBD
11	"The Lost Codex"	Tom Wright	Gabrielle Stanton & Harry Werksman, Jr.	Unaired	TBD
12	"Eternal"	Fred Gerber	Thania St. John & Chad Hodge	Unaired	TBD
13	"Helmholtz Resonance"	Larry Shaw	Patrick Massett & John Zinman	Unaired	TBD
