= The Mermaid Chair (film) =

2006 television film by Steven Schachter

- Theatrical poster
- Genre: Romantic drama
- Based on: The Mermaid Chair by Sue Monk Kidd
- Written by: Suzette Couture
- Directed by: Steven Schachter
- Starring: Kim Basinger; Alex Carter; Roberta Maxwell; Debra Mooney; Lorena Gale; Bruce Greenwood
- Music by: Rolf Lovland
- Country of origin: Canada
- Original language: English

Production
- Executive producer: Randy Robinson
- Producers: Michael Frislev; Chad Oakes
- Cinematography: Mike Southon
- Editor: Jean Beaudoin
- Running time: 90 minutes
- Production companies: Randwell Productions; Nomadic Pictures; Fox Television Studios

Original release
- Network: Lifetime
- Release: September 9, 2006

The Mermaid Chair is a 2006 Canadian television romantic drama film directed by Steven Schachter and written by Suzette Couture. It is based on the 2005 novel of the same name by Sue Monk Kidd, and stars Kim Basinger, Alex Carter, and Bruce Greenwood. It was filmed in Cowichan Bay, Telegraph Cove, and Brentwood Bay in British Columbia, Canada, and premiered on Lifetime on September 9, 2006.

== Synopsis ==
Set on a South Carolina barrier island, the movie tells the story of 42-year-old Jessie Sullivan, a married woman who falls in love with a Benedictine monk, and explores themes of mid-life marriage crisis and her self-awakening.

== Cast ==
- Kim Basinger as Jessie Sullivan
- Alex Carter as Brother 'Whit' Thomas
- Bruce Greenwood as Hugh Sullivan
- Roberta Maxwell as Nelle
- Debra Mooney as Kat
- Lorena Gale as Hepzibah
- Ellie Harvie as Benne
- Ken Pogue as Father Dominic
- Victoria Anderson as Dee
- Shaun Johnston as Joseph Dubois
- Alex Bruhanski as Shem
- Terence Kelly as Dom Anthony
- Joanne Wilson as Woman Patient
- Sy Pederson as Brother Timothy
- L. Harvey Gold as Tourist

== Reception ==
In her review for Variety Laura Fries called the film "slickly produced" and said it had "haunting cinematography by Mike Southon, an impressive supporting cast".
