= The Mermaid Chair =

2005 book by Sue Monk Kidd

- Author: Sue Monk Kidd
- Cover artist: Joy Kim
- Language: English
- Genre: Novel
- Publisher: Viking Press
- Publication date: April 5, 2005
- Publication place: United States
- Media type: Print (Hardcover, Paperback)
- ISBN: 978-0-670-03394-2 (first edition, hardback)
- OCLC: 57068819
- Dewey Decimal: 813/.54 22
- LC Class: PS3611.I44 M47 2005

The Mermaid Chair is a 2005 novel written by American novelist Sue Monk Kidd, which has also been adapted as a Lifetime movie.

== Synopsis ==
The Mermaid Chair is the tale of Jessie Sullivan, a middle-aged woman whose stifled dreams and desires take shape during an extended stay on Egret Island, where she is caring for her troubled mother, Nelle. Once she returns to her childhood home, Jessie is forced to confront not only her relationship with her estranged mother, but her other emotional ties as well. After decades of marriage to Hugh, her practical yet conventional husband, Jessie starts to question whether she is craving an independence she never had the chance to experience. After she meets Brother Thomas, a handsome monk who has yet to take his final vows, Jessie is forced to decide whether passion can coexist with comfort, or if the two are mutually exclusive. As her soul begins to reawaken, Jessie must also confront the circumstances of her father's death, a tragedy that continues to haunt Jessie and Nelle thirty years later.

== Reception ==
The Mermaid Chair reached the #1 spot on the New York Times bestseller list and remained on the hardcover and paperback list for nine months. Winner of the 2005 Quill Award for General Fiction, the novel has been translated into 23 languages.

== Film adaptation ==
A film adaptation starring Kim Basinger as the main character, Jessie, premiered on the Lifetime network September 9, 2006. It was directed by Steven Schachter and produced by Michael Frislev and Chad Oakes of Nomadic Pictures. The executive Producer was Randy Robinson and the associate producer was Jay Daniel Beechinor. The Mermaids images were created by Underwater Cinematographer Pauline R. Heaton.
