= The Secret Life of Bees (novel) =

2001 book by Sue Monk Kidd

- Front cover
- Author: Sue Monk Kidd
- Illustrator: Kim Ellington
- Genre: Historical Fiction
- Published: November 8, 2001
- Publication place: United States
- Pages: 336 pp.
- ISBN: 978-0747266839

The Secret Life of Bees is a novel by American author Sue Monk Kidd. Set in 1964, it is a coming-of-age story about loss, betrayal, and the interracial landscape of the civil-rights era of the American South. The book received critical acclaim and was a New York Times bestseller. It won the 2004 Book Sense Book of the Year Awards (Paperback), and was nominated for the Orange Broadband Prize for Fiction.

== Plot ==
In the fictitious town of Sylvan, South Carolina, in 1964, 14-year-old Lily Melissa Owens lives with her abusive father, T. Ray, and her African-American maid, Rosaleen. Much of Lily's life has been shaped around the blurred memory of the afternoon her mother was killed. Every night, bees fly into her bedroom. After Rosaleen is arrested for pouring her bottle of "snuff juice" on three white men, Lily breaks her out of the hospital, and they decide to leave town. The two begin hitch-hiking toward Tiburon, South Carolina, a place written on the back of an image of the Virgin Mary known as the "Black Madonna", which Deborah, Lily's mother, had owned. In Tiburon, they buy lunch at a general store, and Lily recognizes a picture of the same "Black Mary", but on the side of a jar of honey. Rosaleen and Lily receive directions to the origin of the honey, the Boatwright residence. They are introduced to the Boatwright sisters: August, May, and June, who are all black beekeepers. When Lily meets the sisters, she makes up a story about being an orphan. Believing Lily's story, they invite Lily and Rosaleen to stay with them.

With a new home and a new family for the time being, Lily learns more about the Black Madonna honey that the sisters make. She begins working as August's beekeeping apprentice to repay her for her kindness, while Rosaleen works around the house. Lily finds out that May had a twin sister, April, who died by suicide with their father's shotgun when they were younger. She watches June, who flirts with, but refuses to marry, her boyfriend Neil. Lily and Rosaleen also get to see the sisters' religious ceremonies. The sisters hold service at their house, which they call "the Daughters of Mary." They keep a statue of the "Black Mary", or "Our Lady of Chains", a figurehead from the bow of an ancient ship, and August tells the story of how an enslaved man by the name of Obadiah found this figure. The enslaved men and women thought that God had answered their prayers asking for rescue, and "to send them consolation" and "to send them freedom". It gave them hope, and the figure has been passed down for generations.

Lily eventually meets Zach, August's godson and the two soon develop feelings for each other. They share goals with each other while working the hives. Both Lily and Zach find their goals nearly impossible to meet, but still encourage each other to attempt them. Zach wants to be the "ass-busting lawyer", which means he would be the first black attorney in the area. Lily wants to be a short-story writer.

Lily attempts to tell August the truth, but is interrupted by Zach. They stop at a store to pick up a few things. Zach gets arrested after one of his friends, whom they had met at the store, throws a Coke bottle at a white man, and none of them will tell who did it. Zach and his friends are put in jail. The Boatwright house decides not to tell May in fear of an emotional episode. The secret does not stay hidden for long, and May becomes catatonic with depression and later goes missing. August, June, Lily, and Rosaleen go looking for her, and find her lying dead in the river with a rock on her chest, which appears to be a suicide.

A vigil is held that lasts four days. In that time, Zach is freed from jail with no charges. May's suicide letter is found, and in it, she says, "It's my time to die, and it's your time to live. Don't mess it up." August interprets this as urging June to marry Neil. June, after several rejections, agrees to give her hand in marriage to Neil. Zach vows to Lily that they will be together someday and that they will both achieve their goals.

Lily finally finds out the truth about her mother. August was her mother's nanny, and helped raise her. After her marriage to T. Ray began to sour, Deborah left and went to stay with the Boatwrights. She eventually decided to leave him permanently, and returned to their house to collect Lily. While Deborah was packing to leave, T. Ray returned home and began arguing with her. When the argument turned into a fight, Deborah dropped a gun on the floor in the struggle. Lily picked it up and the gun accidentally discharged, killing Deborah.

While Lily is coming to terms with this information, T. Ray shows up at the Boatwright residence to take her back home. Lily refuses, and T. Ray flies into an enraged rampage. He has a violent flashback that brings him around. August steps in and offers to let Lily stay with her. T. Ray gives in and agrees. Before T. Ray leaves the Boatwright house, Lily asks him about her mother's death. T. Ray confirms that Lily was the one to accidentally kill her mother.

== Symbolism ==
Several symbols and motifs are seen in The Secret Life of Bees. One major symbol is the bees and bee-related objects. Bees are a main symbol and motif in the novel. Bees are a symbol of two main things: Guidance and the power of a female community, which is seen in the theme. A major theme is that Lily is looking for a connection to her mother or some mother figure. In the story, she meets many strong women; she not only grows up with Rosaleen, who is a surrogate mother to Lily, but she also meets the Boatwright sisters and the Daughters of Mary, who enhance this symbol of power in a female community in relation to bees.

Bees can also symbolize organization or "living in a civilized community". This can be connected to the black community and specifically the Boatwright sisters in this novel. Bees are very organized, and every bee needs to do her job. In the novel, a quote says, “when a queen bee is taken from a hive, the other bees notice her absence”, and it is very similar with the Boatwright sisters. Once May's twin April died, May was never the same; she became emotionally sensitive. Once May took her own life, the Boatwright sisters, once again, had to learn how to move on and live with a loss and missing bees.

Honey represents wisdom and knowledge. In the plot, Lily is looking for the Black Mary that is on a honey jar, and after finding the source of this honey, the Boatwright sisters take Lily and Rosaleen in, and begin to share their wisdom and knowledge, about bees, life, Lily's dad T. Ray, and Lily’s mother Deborah.

== Reception ==
The reception of the book was generally positive. Although the novel does include the underlying theme of the civil-rights movement, USA Today felt the novel focused more on Lily's journey towards "self-acceptance, faith, and freedom". The novel was originally published in 2001, and has since sold more than six million copies and has been published in 35 countries. It also stayed on the New York Times best seller list for two and a half years. In 2004, it was named the "Book Sense Paperback of the Year". It was also one of Good Morning America's "Read-This" book club picks, and was nominated for the Orange Prize in England.

== Film adaptation ==
The book was adapted into a film in 2008, directed and written by Gina Prince-Bythewood and produced by Will Smith, with Jada Pinkett Smith as the executive producer. Queen Latifah played August Boatwright, Dakota Fanning played Lily, Alicia Keys played June Boatwright, Jennifer Hudson played Rosaleen, and Sophie Okonedo played May Boatwright.

== Stage musical adaptation ==
The book has been adapted as a stage musical. A workshop was produced by New York Stage and Film and Vassar in 2017. The world-premiere musical adaptation of The Secret Life of Bees was held at the off-Broadway Atlantic Theater Company on May 12, 2019 in previews, with the official opening on June 13. The musical's book is written by Lynn Nottage, with music by Duncan Sheik and lyrics by Susan Birkenhead. The musical is directed by Sam Gold and features Saycon Sengbloh as Rosaleen, Elizabeth Teeter as Lily, and LaChanze, Eisa Davis, and Anastacia McCleskey as the Boatwight beekeeping sisters.
