= The Secret Life of Bees (film) =

2008 American drama film directed by Gina Prince-Bythewood

- Theatrical release poster
- Directed by: Gina Prince-Bythewood
- Screenplay by: Gina Prince-Bythewood
- Based on: The Secret Life of Bees by Sue Monk Kidd
- Produced by: Lauren Shuler Donner; James Lassiter; Will Smith; Joe Pichirallo
- Starring: Queen Latifah; Dakota Fanning; Jennifer Hudson; Alicia Keys; Sophie Okonedo; Paul Bettany
- Cinematography: Rogier Stoffers
- Edited by: Terilyn A. Shropshire
- Music by: Mark Isham
- Production companies: Overbrook Entertainment; The Donners' Company
- Distributed by: Fox Searchlight Pictures
- Release dates: October 17, 2008 (United States); December 5, 2008 (United Kingdom)
- Running time: 110 minutes
- Country: United States
- Language: English
- Budget: $11 million
- Box office: $40 million

The Secret Life of Bees is a 2008 American Southern Gothic drama film adapted from the 2001 novel by Sue Monk Kidd. Starring Queen Latifah, Dakota Fanning, Jennifer Hudson, Alicia Keys, Sophie Okonedo, and Paul Bettany, the film was written and directed by Gina Prince-Bythewood, and produced by Lauren Shuler Donner and Will Smith, with Jada Pinkett Smith as the executive producer.

The Secret Life of Bees was released in the United States on October 17, 2008, and in the United Kingdom on December 5, 2008, to varied reviews. Critics praised it for being faithful to the source material and complimented the performances while some criticized the sentimental tone and the simplistic handling of complex issues. The film became a moderate success financially, grossing $40 million on a budget of $11 million.

== Plot ==
In 1964, Lily Owens lives on a South Carolina peach orchard with her abusive, widowed father T. Ray. Ten years earlier, then-four-year-old Lily had accidentally shot her mother, Deborah, as she was attempting to leave T. Ray.

As Lily's 14th birthday approaches, she celebrates the signing of the Civil Rights Act of 1964 with her father’s Black hired help, Rosaleen. On the night before her birthday, Lily sneaks into the orchard, where she has secretly buried a few mementos of her mother, including a paper reading "Black Madonna Honey, Tiburon, SC." She places the picture of her mother on her stomach to feel closer to her as she lays back to look at the stars.

Lily suddenly hears T. Ray calling for her and quickly hides her mother's belongings. She is caught hastily buttoning her shirt by T. Ray, who assumes she was there with a boy, and punishes her by having her kneel on a pile of grits for an hour.

On her birthday, Rosaleen takes Lily into town under the pretense of fitting Lily for a bra, but also to give Rosaleen the opportunity to register to vote. The pair encounters a group of racists who beat Rosaleen after she stands her ground against their intimidation, and she is arrested. T. Ray retrieves Lily and takes her back home, but she runs away and breaks Rosaleen out of the hospital, where she is being treated for her wounds while she awaits jail. They head for Tiburon, with Lily hoping to figure out more about her mother's past.

A two-day trip brings Lily and Rosaleen to Tiburon where they find their way to the home of August Boatwright and her sisters, May and June. August has used her skills as a beekeeper to build a successful business. Despite the incredulity of Lily's lies about Rosaleen and her circumstances, and June's suspicions, August takes them in, agreeing to provide room and board in exchange for labor.

Lily becomes an apprentice beekeeper, and later discovers May's "wailing wall", tucked full of notes about events that have distressed the brittle and sensitive May, as well as her twin sister April, who died in childhood. She also learns about August’s leadership of a small group of women who pray to the life-sized statue of a Black Madonna in the Boatwright’s living room for guidance.

In time, Lily grows close to Zach, the teenaged son of one member in the prayer group and August's assistant beekeeper. Lily and Zach attend a movie together, but when they ignore the segregation rules, sitting together in the "colored" section, Zach gets kidnapped by a group of townspeople. June and August hide the news from May to try to protect her, but Zach's mother reveals the news to her accidentally. May drowns herself out of grief, but predicts in her suicide note that Zach will be returned alive. Indeed, Zach is returned the next day.

With May's funeral comes some reconciliation and truth. June agrees to wed her long-time boyfriend, whom she had previously rejected repeatedly. Rosaleen is asked to be part of the household family, and August says they will call her "July". Lily, who already believes she killed her mother, now blames herself for Zach's kidnapping and May's death. She has a breakdown, convinced her mother did not want her, feeling unloved and unlovable, and resigns herself to leave before she causes any more harm. Before she is able to go, August challenges her outlook, and tells Lily about her mother, for whom August cared as a child in Virginia and later sheltered from the abuse of T. Ray.

Meanwhile, T. Ray has figured out where Lily is and comes to Tiburon to take her home. When she refuses to leave, August, June, and Rosaleen form a phalanx of support. Lily confronts T. Ray about her mother, and he admits he had lied before: Deborah really had come back for her. With angry reluctance, he leaves her to be raised by the Boatwrights.

== Cast ==
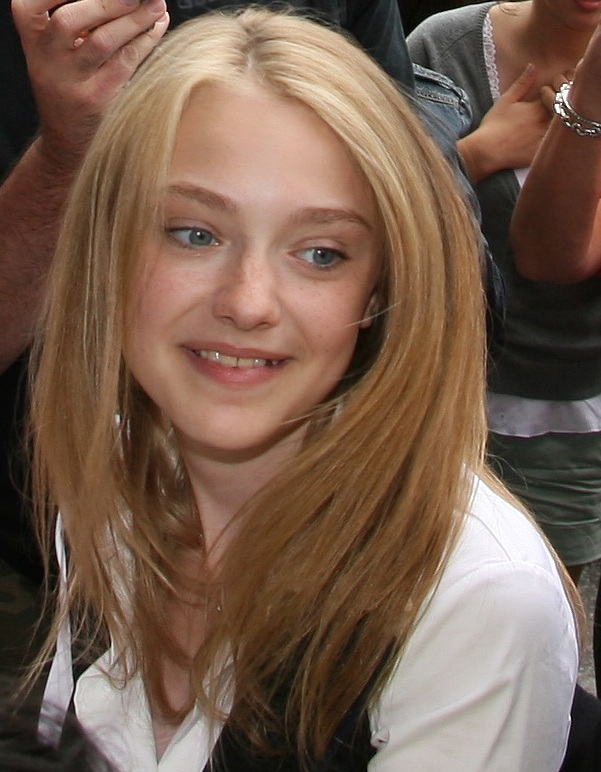
Fanning stars as Lily Owens in the film

- Dakota Fanning as Lily Owens
  - Emily Alyn Lind as young Lily Owens
- Queen Latifah as August Boatwright
- Jennifer Hudson as Rosaleen "July" Boatwright-Daise, Lily's black maid and later adopted into the Boatwright family
- Alicia Keys as June Boatwright, August's younger sister
- Sophie Okonedo as May Boatwright, August's youngest sister
- Paul Bettany as T. Ray Owens, Lily's abusive widowed father
- Hilarie Burton as Deborah Owens, Lily's deceased mother
- Tristan Wilds as Zach Taylor, August's assistant and Lily's love interest
- Nate Parker as Neil, June's boyfriend later fiancé
- Shondrella Avery as Greta Taylor, Zach's mother

== Production ==
Early in the film's development, David Gordon Green was set to direct the film, and Focus Features was set to distribute it. Production began on January 7, 2008, in Lumberton, and Watha, North Carolina, and ended a few months later. The film was screened in September 2008 at the 33rd Annual Toronto International Film Festival, and had an October 17, 2008, theatrical release.

== Soundtrack ==
Original music for The Secret Life of Bees was produced by Mark Isham.

The film features these songs:

1. "Baby, I Need Your Loving" by Lamont Dozier, Brian Holland, and Edward Holland, Jr.
2. "Come See About Me" by Lamont Dozier, Brian Holland, and Edward Holland, Jr.
3. "Prelude (From the Unaccompanied Cello Suite No. 1 In G Major)" by Johann Sebastian Bach
4. "Six Canonic Sonatas Op. 5" by Georg Philipp Telemann
5. "Sonata No. 3 in A Minor for Cello and Continuo: Allegro" by Antonio Vivaldi
6. "The Honey Song" by Sue Monk Kidd
7. "Beautiful" by India.Arie
8. "Breakaway" by Irma Thomas
9. "Come See About Me" by The Supremes
10. "Doncha Know (Sky Is Blue)" by Alicia Keys
11. "Heaven's My Home" by Sam & Ruby
12. "Hippy Hippy Shake" by The Swinging Blue Jeans
13. "I'm Alright" by Little Anthony and the Imperials
14. "It's All Right" by The Impressions
15. "Keep Marching" by Raphael Saadiq
16. "Mary" by Joe Purdy
17. "Song for Mia" by Lizz Wright

The soundtrack for the film was not released as a soundtrack album.

== Reception ==
=== Critical response ===
Rotten Tomatoes reported the film has an approval of 60% based on 139 reviews, with an average rating of 5.94/10. The site's critics' consensus reads: "The Secret Life of Bees has charm, but is largely too maudlin and sticky-sweet." Metacritic gives the film a weighted average score of 57 out of 100, based on 32 critics, indicating "mixed or average reviews". Audiences polled by CinemaScore gave the film an average grade of "A" on an A+ to F scale.

Writing in The New York Times, reviewer A. O. Scott thought the film to be "a familiar and tired fable". Roger Ebert found the film "enchanting" and gave it 3.5/4 stars.

=== Box office ===
The film was No. 3 at the North American box office for its opening weekend with $10.5 million. It later went on to gross $40 million worldwide.

=== Accolades ===
The movie won the awards for "Favorite Movie Drama" and "Favorite Independent Movie" at the 35th People's Choice Awards.

The film received seven NAACP Image Award nominations, which include Outstanding Motion Picture, Outstanding Actress in a Motion Picture (Queen Latifah, Dakota Fanning), Outstanding Actor in a Motion Picture (Nate Parker), and Outstanding Supporting Actress in a Motion Picture (Alicia Keys, Jennifer Hudson, and Sophie Okonedo). The movie won the Image Award for Outstanding Motion Picture.
