= Sue Monk Kidd =

American novelist and memoirist (born 1948)

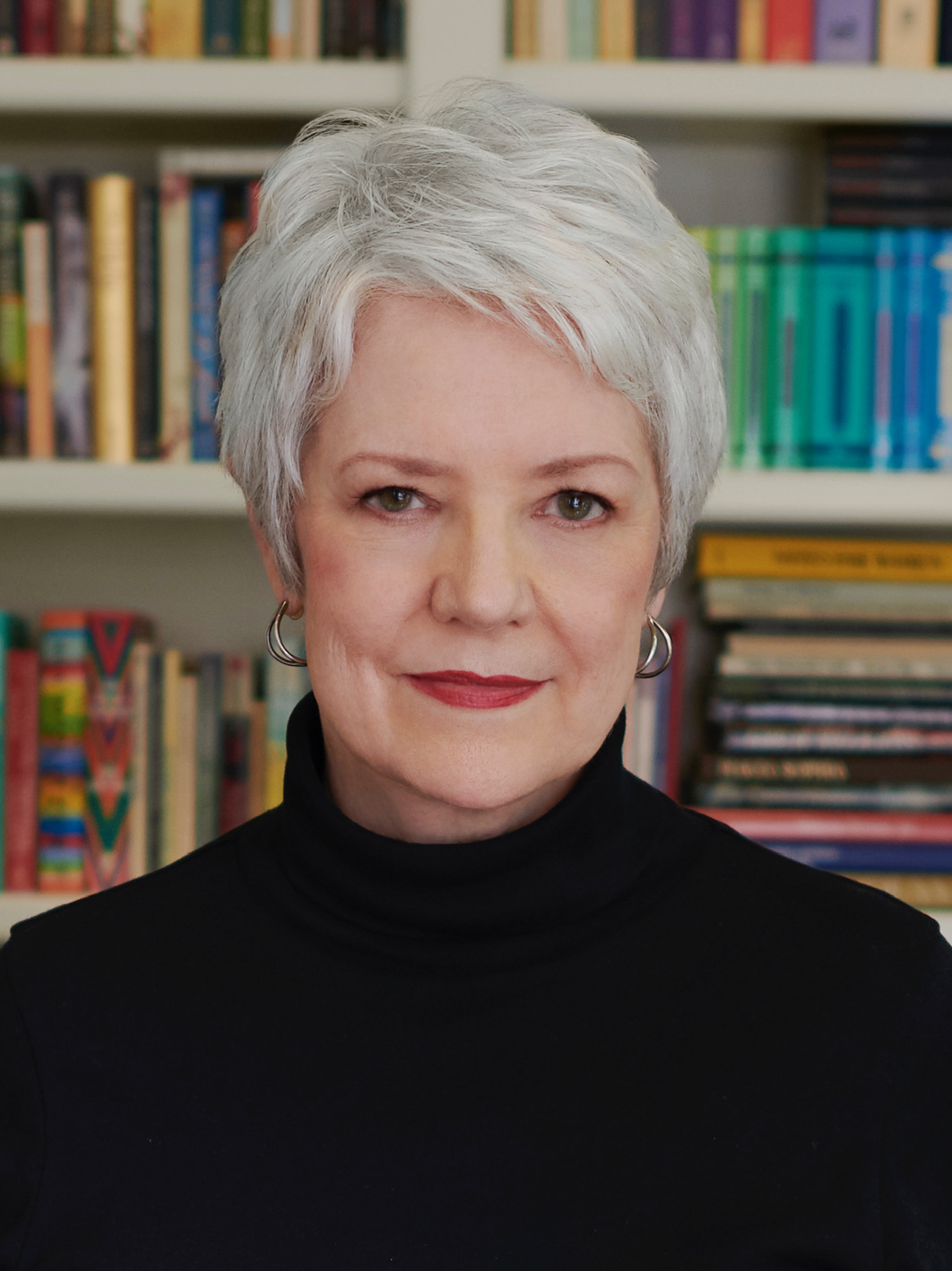
- Kidd in 2019
- Born: August 12, 1948 (age 78); Sylvester, Georgia, U.S.
- Education: Texas Christian University
- Occupations: Novelist, memoirist
- Writing career
- Period: 1988–present
- Genres: Fiction, Historical Fiction, Memoir
- Notable works: The Invention of Wings, The Secret Life of Bees, The Mermaid Chair, The Dance of the Dissident Daughter, Traveling with Pomegranates: A Mother-Daughter Story
- Website: suemonkkidd.com

Sue Monk Kidd (born August 12, 1948) is an American writer from Sylvester, Georgia. She is best known for her historical novels, which frequently deal with themes of race, feminism, and religion and include The Secret Life of Bees and The Book of Longings.

== Early life and education ==
Kidd was born and raised in Sylvester, Georgia. In 1970, she graduated from Texas Christian University with a bachelor of science degree in nursing. She worked as a nursing instructor at the Medical College of Georgia.

Kidd was influenced by the writings of Thomas Merton. She took creative writing courses at Emory University and Anderson University, and studied at Sewanee and the Middlebury Bread Loaf Writers' Conference.

== Career ==
She got her start in writing when a personal essay she wrote for a writing class was published in Guideposts and reprinted in Reader's Digest. She went on to become a contributing editor at Guideposts.

Her first three books were spiritual memoirs describing her experiences in contemplative Christianity, the last telling the story of her journey from traditional Christianity to feminist theology. God's Joyful Surprise: Finding Yourself Loved (Harper San Francisco, 1988) is focused on abandoning a hopeless quest for perfection and accepting one is loved as one is. When the Heart Waits: Spiritual Direction for Life's Sacred Questions (Harper San Francisco, 1990) tells of her painful midlife crisis. Finally, The Dance of the Dissident Daughter: A Woman's Journey from Christian Tradition to the Sacred Feminine (Harper San Francisco, 1996), discussed her encounter with women's spirituality.

Her first novel, The Secret Life of Bees (2002), is set during the American civil rights movement of 1964, telling the story of a white girl who runs away from home to live with a black woman who now works as an independent beekeeper and honey-maker with many of her sisters. It has been adapted as an award-winning play in New York City and debuted off-Broadway at the Atlantic Theater. The novel was also adapted as a movie of the same name by Fox Searchlight, starring Dakota Fanning, Queen Latifah, Jennifer Hudson, Alicia Keys, and Sophie Okonedo. The Secret Life of Bees movie won two People's Choice Awards at the 35th annual awards ceremony, taking home Best Movie Drama and Best Independent Movie.

Her second novel, The Mermaid Chair (2005), won the 2005 Quill Award for General Fiction. The story concerns a woman, who upon coming home to an island off the coast of South Carolina, becomes attracted to a Benedictine monk who is just a few months short of taking his final vows. The title refers to a chair in his monastery carved with mermaids dedicated to a female saint said to be a mermaid before her conversion and who is patroness of the island. It was adapted as a 2006 Lifetime movie of the same name starring Kim Basinger and Bruce Greenwood.

In 2006, Firstlight, a collection of Kidd's early writings, was published in hardcover by Guideposts Books; it was published in paperback by Penguin in 2007.

After traveling with her daughter, Ann Kidd Taylor, to sacred sites in Greece, Turkey, and France, Kidd and Taylor co-authored a memoir, Traveling with Pomegranates: A Mother-Daughter Story. Published by Viking in 2009, it appeared on numerous bestseller lists, including the New York Times list, and it has been published in several languages.

Her 2014 novel The Invention of Wings is set during the antebellum period and based on the life of Sarah Grimké, a 19th-century abolitionist and women's-rights pioneer. The novel debuted at number one on The New York Times Best Seller list and was later selected for Oprah's Book Club 2.0. In April, Kidd appeared in an interview with Oprah on OWN's Super Soul Sunday episode.

Kidd's novel The Book of Longings was published on April 21, 2020. It tells the fictional story of Ana, an educated woman who marries Jesus Christ. Her formerly privileged life changes greatly, and she is often left alone once Jesus begins his ministry. Kidd was inspired to consider the idea of a wife of Jesus by a Biblical hoax featured on National Geographic, explaining that "my imagination was ignited. I thought, if Jesus' wife ever existed, she would be the most silenced woman in Western history". The first 14 months of the writing process were taken up by extensive research on the period and setting, including Kidd's own travel notes on Egypt, Palestine, and Jordan. D. G. Martin calls it "an enriching and challenging read."

== Personal life ==
Kidd is married to Sanford "Sandy" Kidd. The couple have two children, Bob and Ann. She has lived in Charleston and Mt. Pleasant, South Carolina, and Florida. She resides in North Carolina. Ann frequently helps with Kidd's writing as a proofreader.

In September 2024, Kidd announced on her social media that she suffers from Parkinson's disease and had been first diagnosed with it in May 2019.

== Works ==
Fiction

- The Secret Life of Bees, 2001
- The Mermaid Chair, 2005
- The Invention of Wings, 2014
- The Book of Longings, 2020

Non-Fiction

- God's Joyful Surprise: Finding Yourself Loved, 1988
- When the Heart Waits: Spiritual Direction for Life's Sacred Questions, 1990
- The Dance of the Dissident Daughter: A Woman's Journey from Christian Tradition to the Sacred Feminine, 1996
- Firstlight: The Early Inspirational Writings of Sue Monk Kidd, 2006
- Traveling with Pomegranates: A Mother-Daughter Journey to the Sacred Places of Greece, Turkey and France (with Ann Kidd Taylor). Viking, 2009
- Writing, Creativity and Soul, 2025
