= Forbidden Broadway: 20th Anniversary Edition =

Forbidden Broadway: 20th Anniversary Edition is the sixth volume in the Forbidden Broadway Cast Albums. Although there isn't a show with the same title, the CD has twenty-five of Forbidden Broadway's best songs, including eight previously unreleased tracks. It was conceived, created and written (parody lyrics) by Gerard Alessandrini.

The CD bears the label "The Ultimate Unreleased Un-Original Cast Recording," pointing out that this does not exclusively feature the original cast. The liner notes give a retrospective of Forbidden Broadway's beginnings, as well as a gallery of photos of the original cast with the stars they mock so lovingly.

This CD returns the parodies of such shows as Ragtime, Annie, Into the Woods, Cats, Martin Guerre, and Les Misérables. Stars like Julie Andrews, Mandy Patinkin, and Patti Lupone also share the ridicule.

== Featured performers ==
(In order of first listing in liner notes):

- Gerard Alessandrini
- Fred Barton (piano for tracks 1, 17a, 19, and 25)
- Bill Carmichael
- Nora Mae Lyng
- Chlöe Webb
- Herndon Lackey
- Brad Oscar
- Craig Wells
- Christine Pedi
- John Freedson
- Brad Ellis (piano for tracks 2, 3, 9, 10, 15, 16, 17b, and 19- 24)
- Susanne Blakeslee
- Jason Graae
- Toni DiBuono
- Tom Plotkin
- Bryan Batt
- Lori Hammel
- Edward Staudenmayer
- Michael McGrath
- Karen Murphy
- Roxie Lucas
- Phillip George
- Dorothy Kiara
- Kevin Ligon
- Linda Strasser
- Carol Channing
- Gina Kreiezmar
- Stephen Potfora
- Kristine Zbornik
- Terri White
- Philip Fortenberry (piano for tracks 4, 8, 11, 13, and 14)
- Matthew Ward (piano for tracks 5- 7 and 18)
- August Eriksmoen (piano for track 21)

== Tracks ==
Listed here are the tracks on the CD, with the title of the number followed by the song which it parodies and the original composer.

- 01 Forbidden Broadway (original, Alessandrini) (volume 1)
- 02 The Music Man (volume 3)

Trouble in New York City ("Trouble", Wilson)

- 03 My Fair Lady (previously unreleased)

Import Gavotte ("Ascot Gavotte", Lerner-Lowe)

- 04 Annie (volume 2)

Tomorrow ("Tomorrow", Strouse-Charnin)

- 05 Cameron Mackintosh (volume 4)

My Souvenir Things ("My Favorite Things", Rodgers-Hammerstein)

- 06 Elaine Stritch (volume 4)

Stritch ("Zip!", Rodgers-Hart)

- 07 The Lion King (volume 5)

Circle of Mice ("Circle of Life", John-Rice)
Can You Feel the Pain Tonight? ("Can You Feel the Love Tonight?", John-Rice)

- 08 Patti Lupone (volume 2)

Patti Lupone ("Anything Goes", Porter)
I Get a Kick Out of Me ("I Get a Kick Out of You", Porter)

- 09 Martin Guerre (previously unreleased)

It's Martin Guerre ("I'm Martin Guerre", Boubil-Schönberg-Clark)

- 10 Julie Andrews (volume 3)

I Couldn't Hit that Note ("I Could've Danced All Night", Lerner-Lowe)

- 11 Into the Woods (volume 2)

Into the Words ("Into the Woods", Sondheim)

- 12 Chita Rivera / Rita Morena (volume 2)

Chita-Rita ("America", Bernstein-Sondheim)

- 13 Mandy Patinkin (volume 2)

Somewhat Overindulgent ("Over the Rainbow", Arlen-Harburg)

- 14 Les Misérables (volume 2)

Les Misera-Blah ("C'est Magnifique", Porter)
End of the Play ("End of the Day", Boubil-Schönberg)
I Dreamed a Show ("I Dreamed a Dream", Boubil-Schönberg)
Bring It Down ("Bring Him Home", Boubil-Schönberg)

- 15 Carol Channing (volume 3)

Imitation is the Sincerest Form of Flattery (original, Alessandrini)

- 16 Old Revivals (previously unreleased)

Old Revivals ("Oklahoma!", Rodgers-Hammerstein)

- 17 Merman and Martin

It's De-Merman ("It's De-Lovely", Porter) (volume 1)
Old Fashioned Ballad ("Old Fashioned Wedding", Berlin) (volume 3)

- 18 Ragtime (volume 5)

Gagtime ("Ragtime", Flaherty-Ahrens)
A Really Long Note ("The Wheels of a Dream", Flaherty-Ahrens)

- 19 Sarah Brightman (previously unreleased)

Time I Said, "Goodbye" ("Con te Partirò", Sartori-Quarantotto)

- 20 Aspects of Love (previously unreleased)

I Sleep with Everyone ("Love Changes Everything", Lloyd Webber-Rice-Hart)

- 21 Screamgirls (previously unreleased)

And I Am Telling You I'm Not Screaming ("And I Am Telling You I'm Not Going", Ayen-Krieger)

- 22 Liza Minnelli (previously unreleased)

Liza One-Note ("Johnny One-Note", Rodgers-Hart)

- 23 Back to Barbra (volume 3)

Back To Broadway ("On A Clear Day", Lerner-Loewe)

- 24 Cats (previously unreleased)

I Enjoy Being a Cat ("I Enjoy Being a Girl", Rodgers-Hammerstein)
Memory ("Memory", Lloyd Webber-Eliot)

- 25 Fiddler on the Roof (volume 1)

Ambition ("Tradition", Bock-Harnick)

== See also ==
- Forbidden Broadway
- Forbidden Broadway, Vol. 1
- Forbidden Broadway, Vol. 2
- Forbidden Broadway, Vol. 3
- Forbidden Hollywood
- Forbidden Broadway Strikes Back
- Forbidden Broadway Cleans Up Its Act
- Forbidden Broadway 2001: A Spoof Odyssey
- Forbidden Broadway: Special Victims Unit
- Forbidden Broadway: Rude Awakening
- Forbidden Broadway Goes to Rehab
