= Forbidden Broadway, Vol. 3 =

Forbidden Broadway, Volume 3 is the third album released to accompany Gerard Alessandrini's off-Broadway show Forbidden Broadway, which spoofs Broadway's latest musicals. Volume 3 was recorded at Sound On Sound, New York City, November 11 & 15, 1993; mixed at DSW Mastering Studios, NYC, and released in 1994.

The album follows the tradition of pointing fingers at Broadway's latest. But according to Alessandrini in the liner notes, the album almost didn't make the cut. After twelve years, he was ready to quit, but new shows came along and practically offered themselves to parodies. He also mentions that FB has expanded to spoof the less successful musicals (assuming, of course, that a lot of people have heard of them). All the "new" lyrics are (as always) by Gerard Alesandrini.

Volume 3 spoofs shows like Miss Saigon, Grand Hotel, Blood Brothers, and Kiss of the Spider Woman and stars like Ethel Merman, Michael Crawford, Carol Channing, Robert Goulet, and Dustin Hoffman. Additionally this album features the real Carol Channing as special guest vocal on track #01.

This album, like Volume 2, bears the label "Unoriginal Cast Recording", since it does not feature the original five performers (although Nora Mae Lyng of the original cast is featured on it).

== Cast ==
- Gerard Alessandrini
- Susanne Blakeslee
- Carol Channing
- Brad Ellis
- John Freedson
- Dorothy Atcheson
- Ashish Bhattacherjee
- Gina Kreiezmar
- Herndon Lackey
- Roxie Lucas
- Nora Mae Lyng
- Brad Oscar
- Marilyn Pasekoff
- Christine Pedi
- Stephen Potfora
- Barbara Walsh
- Craig Wells

== Tracks ==
The numbers on the album are as following, with the number's name, original song and original composer listed.

01 Carol Channing Sequence

Imitation Is The Sincerest Form Of Flattery (original, Alessandrini)

02 Forbidden Broadway Volume 3 (original, Alessandrini)

03 Trouble in New York City ("Ya Got Trouble", Willson)

04 Guys And Dolls Sequence

Guys And Dolls (Loesser)

I Know I've Seen This Show Before ("I've Never Been In Love Before", Loesser)

A Bushel On My Neck ("A Bushel And A Peck", Loesser)

Chew It ("Sue Me", Loesser)

05 Topol

If I Sing It Slower ("If I Were A Rich Man", Bock-Harnick)

06 Anna Karenina: The Musical

On The Ashkebad, Tbilisi And Kiev Express ("On The Atcheson, Topeka And The Santa Fe", Warren-Mercer)

07 Julie Andrews

I Couldn't Hit That Note ("I Could Have Danced All Night", Lerner-Loewe)

08 Grim Hotel

Grim Hotel ("Grand Hotel", Yeston)

I Can't Learn This Song So Quickly ("Love Can't Happen Quite So Quickly", Yeston)

Folies Bergère (Yeston)

09 Barbra: The Broadway Album

Someday ("Somewhere", Bernstein-Sondheim)

10 Dustin Hoffman

Dear Antonio ("Mrs. Robinson", Simon-Garfunkel)

The Sound Of Shakespeare ("The Sound of Silence", Simon-Garfunkel)

11 Return To Merman And Martin

Everything's Coming Up Merman ("Everything's Coming Up Roses", Styne-Sondheim)

Old Fashioned Ballad ("Old Fashioned Wedding", Berlin)

There's Nobody In Show Business ("There's No Business Like Show Business", Berlin)

12 Miss Saigon

Tonight Who Will Play Miss Saigon? ("Tonight I Will Be Miss Saigon", Boublil-Schönberg)

You Are Hallmark, I Postcard ("Sun and Moon", Boublil-Schönberg)

13 Michael Crawford Sequence

Put On Your Phony Voice ("Put On Your Sunday Clothes", Herman)

All I Ask Of You (original, Alessandrini-Ellis)

14 Robert Goulet Sequence

Camelounge ("Camelot", Lerner-Loewe)

15 Mess Of The Spider Woman

Come And See Me ("Prologue", Kander-Ebb)

Mess Of The Spider Woman ("Kiss Of The Spider Woman", Kander-Ebb)

Queer One ("Dear One", Kander-Ebb)

You're A Star ("Where You Are", Kander-Ebb)

16 Back To Barbra

Back To Broadway ("On A Clear Day", Lerner-Loewe)

17 Mug Brothers

Tell Me It's Not True (Russell)

Marilyn Monroe (Russell)

I Think I'm Acting ("I Think I Love You", Romeo)

Downshow ("Downtown", Hatch)

18 The Who's Tommy

Scenery, Fly Me, Amplify Me ("See Me, Heal Me, Touch Me, Feel Me", Townshend)

Listening To Us ("Listening To You", Townshend)

19 Finale

What Happened To Heart? ("You've Got To Have Heart", Adler-Ross)

== See also ==
- Forbidden Broadway
- Forbidden Broadway, Vol. 1
- Forbidden Broadway, Vol. 2
- Forbidden Hollywood
- Forbidden Broadway Strikes Back
- Forbidden Broadway Cleans Up Its Act
- Forbidden Broadway: 20th Anniversary Edition
- Forbidden Broadway 2001: A Spoof Odyssey
- Forbidden Broadway: Special Victims Unit
- Forbidden Broadway: Rude Awakening
- Forbidden Broadway Goes to Rehab
