= Drama Desk Award for Outstanding Revue =

American theatre award

- Awarded for: Outstanding Revue
- Location: New York City
- Country: United States
- Presented by: Drama Desk
- First award: 1991
- Currently held by: Amid Falling Walls (2024)
- Website: dramadesk.org (defunct)

The Drama Desk Award for Outstanding Revue is an annual award presented by Drama Desk in recognition of achievements in the theatre across collective Broadway, off-Broadway and off-off-Broadway productions in New York City.

The category, recognizing the mixed nature of revue productions (as compared to plays or musical productions), was first presented at the 1991 ceremony, as the Drama Desk Award for Outstanding Musical Revue/Entertainment, changing to the shorter name in 1992. It was last presented in 2017.

== Winners and nominees ==
=== 1990s ===
Year	Production
1991
1991	And the World Goes 'Round
1991	Forever Plaid
1991	Smoke on the Mountain
1991	Those Were the Days
1992, 1993	—N/a
1994
1994	Whoop-Dee-Doo!
1994	Amphigorey
1994	A Grand Night for Singing
1995, 1996	—N/a
1997
1997	When Pigs Fly
1997	Forbidden Broadway Strikes Back
1997	I Love You, You're Perfect, Now Change
1998	—N/a
1999
1999	Fosse
1999	Forbidden Broadway Cleans Up Its Act
1999	It Ain't Nothin' But the Blues
1999	Woody Guthrie's American Song

=== 2000s ===
Year	Production
2000	—N/a
2001
2001	Forbidden Broadway 2001: A Spoof Odyssey
2001	American Rhapsody
2001	newyorkers
2002–2004	—N/a
2005
2005	Forbidden Broadway: Special Victims Unit
2005	Absolutely Fascinating
2005	Newsical
2006, 2007	—N/a
2008
2008	Forbidden Broadway: Rude Awakening
2008	Fugitive Songs
2008	Make Me a Song
2009	—N/a

=== 2010s ===
Year	Production
2010
2010	Sondheim on Sondheim
2010	Fascinating Aïda Absolutely Miraculous!
2010	Million Dollar Quartet
2010	Newsical
2010	Simon Green: Traveling Light
2011
2011	RAIN – A Tribute to the Beatles
2011	Fyvush Finkel Live!
2011	Newsical the Musical: Full Spin Ahead
2012
2012	The Best is Yet to Come: The Music of Cy Coleman
2012	Newsical the Musical: End of the World Edition
2013
2013	Old Hats
2013	Forbidden Broadway: Alive and Kicking!
2013	Old Jews Telling Jokes
2014
2014	After Midnight
2014	I'm a Stranger Here Myself: Musik from the Weimar and Beyond
2014	Le Jazz Hot: How the French Saved Jazz
2014	Til Divorce Do Us Part
2014	What's It All About? Bacharach Reimagined
2015
2015	Just Jim Dale
2015	Forbidden Broadway Comes Out Swinging!
2015	Lennon: Through a Glass Onion
2015	Lonesome Traveler
2016	—N/a
2017
2017	Life is for Living: Conversations with Coward
2017	Hello Dillie!
2018-2023	—N/a
2024
2024	Amid Falling Walls
