= Drama Desk Award for Outstanding Featured Actress in a Musical =

American theatre award

Drama Desk Award for Outstanding Featured Actress
- Awarded for: Outstanding Featured Actress in a Musical
- Location: New York City
- Country: United States
- Presented by: Drama Desk
- First award: 1975
- Final award: 2022
- Website: dramadesk.org (defunct)

Drama Desk Award for Outstanding Featured Actress in a Musical was an annual award presented by Drama Desk in recognition of achievements in theatre across collective Broadway, off-Broadway and off-off-Broadway productions in New York City. The award was one of eight new acting awards first presented in 1975, when Drama Desk retired an earlier award that had made no distinction between work in plays and musicals, nor between actors and actresses, nor between lead performers and featured performers.

After the 2022 ceremony, all eight acting categories introduced in 1975 were retired. The award for Outstanding Featured Actress in a Musical, along with Outstanding Featured Actor in a Musical, were replaced in 2023 with the gender neutral category of Outstanding Featured Performance in a Musical.

== Winners and nominees ==
Key

and bold indicates the winner.

=== 1970s ===
Year	Actress	Musical	Character
1975
1975	**Donna Theodore**	**Shenandoah**	**Ann Anderson**
1975	Boni Enten	The Rocky Horror Show	Columbia
1975	Kelly Garrett	The Night That Made America Famous	Various Characters
1975	Mabel King	The Wiz	Evillene
1975	Bonnie Langford	Gypsy	Baby June
1975	Penelope Milford	Shenandoah	Jenny Anderson
1976
1976	**Vivian Reed**	**Bubbling Brown Sugar**	**Marsha / Young Irene**
1976	Travis Hudson	Very Good Eddie	Madame Matroppo
1976	Mary Lou Rosato	The Robber Bridegroom	Salome
1977
1977	**Dorothy Loudon**	**Annie**	**Miss Hannigan**
1977	Delores Ivory Davis	Porgy and Bess	Serena
1977	Ernestine Jackson	Guys and Dolls	Sarah Brown
1977	Barbara Lang	The Robber Bridegroom	Salome
1977	Rita Moreno	She Loves Me	Ilona Ritter
1978
1978	**Swoosie Kurtz**	**A History of the American Film**	**Bette**
1978	**Bobo Lewis**	**Working**	**Rose / Grace / Fran / Lucille**
1978	Pamela Blair	The Best Little Whorehouse in Texas	Amber
1978	Lenora Nemetz	Working	Babe / Terry / Delores
1979
1979	**Merle Louise**	**Sweeney Todd**	**Lucy Barker / The Beggar Woman**
1979	Patricia Drylie	Ballroom	Angie
1979	Lynnie Godfrey	Eubie!	Various Characters
1979	Grace Keagy	Carmelina	Rosa
1979	Lisa Mordente	Platinum	Crystal Mason

=== 1980s ===
Year	Actress	Musical	Character
1980
1980	**Debbie Allen**	**West Side Story**	**Anita**
1980	Peggy Hewett	A Day in Hollywood / A Night in the Ukraine	Mrs. Pavlenko
1980	Carolyn Mignini	Tintypes	Performer
1980	Janie Sell	God Bless You, Mr. Rosewater	Sylvia Rosewater
1980	Crissy Wilzak	The 1940's Radio Hour	Ginger Brooks
1980	Mary Catherine Wright	Tintypes	Performer
1981
1981	**Marilyn Cooper**	**Woman of the Year**	**Jan Donovan**
1981	Jennifer Holliday	Your Arms Too Short to Box with God	Performer
1981	Debbie Shapiro	Perfectly Frank	Performer
1982
1982	**Liliane Montevecchi**	**Nine**	**Liliane La Fleur**
1982	**Anita Morris**	**Nine**	**Carla Albanese**
1982	Laurie Beechman	Joseph and the Amazing Technicolor Dreamcoat	The Narrator
1982	Shelly Burch	Nine	Claudia
1982	Lonette McKee	The First	Rachel
1983
1983	**Karla Burns**	**Show Boat**	**Queenie**
1983	Rebecca Wright	Merlin	Philomena
1983	Michele-Denise Woods	The Cradle Will Rock	Ella Hammer
1984
1984	**Catherine Cox**	**Baby**	**Pam Sakarian**
1984	**Lila Kedrova**	**Zorba**	**Madame Hortense**
1984	Laura Dean	Doonesbury	Boopsie
1984	Bonnie Koloc	The Human Comedy	Kate
1984	Marni Nixon	Taking My Turn	Edna
1985
1985	**Leilani Jones**	**Grind**	**Satin**
1985	Sharon Murray	Grind	Romaine
1985	Marianne Tatum	The Three Musketeers	Milady de Winter
1985	Charlayne Woodard	Hang on to the Good Times	Performer
1986
1986	**Jana Schneider**	**The Mystery of Edwin Drood**	**Helena Landless / Janet Conover**
1986	Desiree Colman	Big Deal	Phoebe
1986	Faye Grant	Singin' in the Rain	Lina
1986	Kathryn McAteer	Mayor	Performer
1986	Bebe Neuwirth	Sweet Charity	Nickie
1987
1987	**Jane Summerhays**	**Me and My Girl**	**Jaqueline 'Jackie' Carstone**
1987	Michele Bautier	Stardust	Performer
1987	Sandra Chinn	Funny Feet	Various Characters
1987	Judy Kuhn	Rags	Bella Cohen
1987	Judy Kuhn	Les Misérables	Cosette
1987	Marcia Lewis	Rags	Rachel Halpern
1988
1988	**Joanna Gleason**	**Into the Woods**	**The Baker's Wife**
1988	Danielle Ferland	Into the Woods	Little Red Ridinghood
1988	Lyn Greene	Flora the Red Menace	Comrade Charlotte
1988	Judy Kaye	The Phantom of the Opera	Carlotta
1989
1989	—N/a	—N/a	—N/a

=== 1990s ===
Year	Actress	Musical	Character
1990
1990	**Randy Graff**	**City of Angels**	**Oolie / Donna**
1990	Danielle Du Clos	Aspects of Love	Jenny Dillingham
1990	Jane Krakowski	Grand Hotel	Freida Flamm / Flaemmchen
1990	Crista Moore	Gypsy	Louise
1991
1991	**Karen Ziemba**	**And the World Goes 'Round**	**Various Characters**
1991	Alison Fraser	The Secret Garden	Martha Sowerby
1991	Rebecca Luker	The Secret Garden	Lily
1991	Regina Resnik	A Little Night Music	Madame Armfeldt
1992
1992	**Tonya Pinkins**	**Jelly's Last Jam**	**Anita**
1992	Liz Larsen	The Most Happy Fella	Cleo
1992	Michele Pawk	Crazy for You	Irene Roth
1992	Barbara Walsh	Falsettos	Trina
1993
1993	**Andrea Martin**	**My Favorite Year**	**Alice Miller**
1993	Julie Andrews	Putting It Together	Amy
1993	Tovah Feldshuh	Hello Muddah, Hello Faddah!	Various Characters
1993	Karen Mason	Carnival!	Rosalie
1993	Rachel York	Putting It Together	The Younger Woman
1994
1994	**Audra McDonald**	**Carousel**	**Carrie Pipperidge**
1994	Judy Blazer	Hello Again	The Nurse
1994	Sally Mayes	She Loves Me	Ilona Ritter
1994	Donna Murphy	Hello Again	The Whore
1994	Alene Robertson	Annie Warbucks	Commissioner Harriet Doyle
1995	No award given.		
1996
1996	**Rachel York**	**Victor/Victoria**	**Norma Cassidy**
1996	Veanne Cox	Company	Amy
1996	Kathy Fitzgerald	Swinging on a Star	Various Characters
1996	Donna McKechnie	State Fair	Emily Arden
1996	Christine Pedi	Forbidden Hollywood	Various Characters
1997
1997	**Lillias White**	**The Life**	**Sonja**
1997	Marcia Lewis	Chicago	Matron "Mama" Morton
1997	Andrea Martin	Candide	Old Lady
1997	Debra Monk	Steel Pier	Shelby Stevens
1997	Jennifer Simard	I Love You, You're Perfect, Now Change	Woman #1
1997	Ruth Williamson	The Green Heart	Mrs. Tragger
1998
1998	**Tsidii Le Loka**	**The Lion King**	**Rafiki**
1998	Betty Buckley	Triumph of Love	Hesione
1998	Lea DeLaria	On the Town	Hildy Esterhazy
1998	Anna Kendrick	High Society	Dinah Lord
1998	Ednita Nazario	The Capeman	Esmeralda Agrón
1998	Michele Pawk	Cabaret	Fraulein Kost
1999
1999	**Kristin Chenoweth**	**You're a Good Man, Charlie Brown**	**Sally Brown**
1999	Gretha Boston	It Ain't Nothin' But the Blues	Various Characters
1999	Cheryl Freeman	The Civil War	Bessie Toler
1999	Penny Fuller	A New Brain	Mimi Schwinn
1999	Jane Lanier	Fosse	Various Characters
1999	Eloise Laws	It Ain't Nothin' But the Blues	Various Characters

=== 2000s ===
Year	Actress	Musical	Character
2000
2000	**Karen Ziemba**	**Contact**	**Wife**
2000	Nancy Anderson	Jolson and Co.	Mae West
2000	Sally Ann Howes	James Joyce's The Dead	Aunt Julia Morkan
2000	Eartha Kitt	The Wild Party	Dolores
2000	Alix Korey	The Wild Party	Madelaine True
2000	Idina Menzel	The Wild Party	Kate
2001
2001	**Cady Huffman**	**The Producers**	**Ulla Swanson**
2001	Polly Bergen	Follies	Carlotta Campion
2001	Kathleen Freeman	The Full Monty	Jeanette Burmeister
2001	Randy Graff	A Class Act	Sophie
2001	Spencer Kayden	Urinetown	Little Sally
2001	Janine LaManna	Seussical	Gertrude McFuzz
2002
2002	**Harriet Harris**	**Thoroughly Modern Millie**	**Mrs. Meers**
2002	Liz Callaway	The Spitfire Grill	Shelby
2002	Judy Kaye	Mamma Mia!	Rosie Mulligan
2002	Andrea Martin	Oklahoma!	Aunt Eller
2002	Karen Mason	Mamma Mia!	Tanya Chesham-Leigh
2002	Kerry O'Malley	Into the Woods	The Baker's Wife
2003
2003	**Jane Krakowski**	**Nine**	**Carla Albanese**
2003	Kerry Butler	Hairspray	Penny Pingleton
2003	Mary Stuart Masterson	Nine	Luisa Contini
2003	Sally Mayes	Urban Cowboy	Aunt Corene
2003	Chita Rivera	Nine	Lillane La Fleur
2003	Debra Walton	Cookin' at the Cookery	Young Alberta Hunter
2004
2004	**Isabel Keating**	**The Boy from Oz**	**Judy Garland**
2004	Lovette George	The Musical of Musicals (The Musical!)	Various Characters
2004	Alix Korey	Listen to My Heart	Various Characters
2004	Anika Noni Rose	Caroline, or Change	Emmie Thibodeaux
2004	Jennifer Simard	The Thing About Men	Woman
2004	Mary Testa	First Lady Suite	Lorena Hickock
2005
2005	**Jan Maxwell**	**Chitty Chitty Bang Bang**	**Baroness Bomburst**
2005	Joanna Gleason	Dirty Rotten Scoundrels	Muriel
2005	Kecia Lewis	Dessa Rose	Dorcas
2005	Maureen McGovern	Little Women	Marmee
2005	Jennifer Simard	Forbidden Broadway: Special Victims Unit	Various Characters
2005	Sarah Uriarte Berry	The Light in the Piazza	Franca Naccarelli
2006
2006	**Beth Leavel**	**The Drowsy Chaperone**	**Beatrice Stockwell**
2006	Carolee Carmello	Lestat	Gabrielle
2006	Leslie Kritzer	The Great American Trailer Park Musical	Pickles
2006	Amy Spanger	The Wedding Singer	Holly
2006	Mary Testa	See What I Wanna See	Aunt Monica
2006	Mary Louise Wilson	Grey Gardens	Edith Bouvier Beale
2007
2007	**Debra Monk**	**Curtains**	**Carmen Bernstein**
2007	Linda Balgord	The Pirate Queen	Queen Elizabeth I
2007	Celia Keenan-Bolger	Les Misérables	Éponine
2007	Orfeh	Legally Blonde	Paulette
2007	Barbara Walsh	Company	Joanne
2007	Karen Ziemba	Curtains	Georgia Hendricks
2008
2008	**Laura Benanti**	**Gypsy**	**Louise**
2008	Leslie Kritzer	A Catered Affair	Jane Hurley
2008	Andrea Martin	Young Frankenstein	Frau Blucher
2008	Mary Testa	Xanadu	Melpomene / Medusa
2008	Amy Warren	Adding Machine	Daisy Devore
2008	Mare Winningham	10 Million Miles	Various Characters
2009
2009	**Haydn Gwynne**	**Billy Elliot the Musical**	**Mrs. Wilkinson**
2009	Farah Alvin	The Marvelous Wonderettes	Missy
2009	Christina Bianco	Forbidden Broadway Goes to Rehab	Various Characters
2009	Karen Olivo	West Side Story	Anita
2009	Nancy Opel	The Toxic Avenger	Mayor
2009	Martha Plimpton	Pal Joey	Gladys Bumps

=== 2010s ===
Year	Actress	Musical	Character
2010
2010	**Katie Finneran**	**Promises, Promises**	**Marge MacDougall**
2010	Carolee Carmello	The Addams Family	Alice Beineke
2010	Carrie Cimma	Lizzie Borden	Bridget Sullivan
2010	Angela Lansbury	A Little Night Music	Madame Armfeldt
2010	Kenita R. Miller	Langston in Harlem	Zora Neale Hurston
2010	Terri White	Finian's Rainbow	Dottie
2011
2011	**Laura Benanti**	**Women on the Verge of a Nervous Breakdown**	**Candela**
2011	Kerry Butler	Catch Me If You Can	Brenda Strong
2011	Victoria Clark	Sister Act	Mother Superior
2011	Jill Eikenberry	The Kid	Judith Savage
2011	Nikki M. James	The Book of Mormon	Nabalungi Hatimbi
2011	Patti LuPone	Women on the Verge of a Nervous Breakdown	Lucia
2011	Laura Osnes	Anything Goes	Hope Harcourt
2012
2012	**Judy Kaye**	**Nice Work If You Can Get It**	**Estonia Dulworth**
2012	Marin Mazzie	Carrie	Margaret White
2012	Jessie Mueller	On a Clear Day You Can See Forever	Melinda Wells
2012	Elaine Paige	Follies	Carlotta Campion
2012	Sarah Sokolovic	The Shaggs: Philosophy of the World	Betty Wiggin
2012	Melissa van der Schyff	Bonnie & Clyde	Blanche Barrow
2013
2013	**Andrea Martin**	**Pippin**	**Berthe**
2013	Annaleigh Ashford	Kinky Boots	Lauren
2013	Melissa Errico	Passion	Clara
2013	Jessie Mueller	The Mystery of Edwin Drood	Helena Landless / Miss Janet Conover
2013	Christiane Noll	Chaplin: The Musical	Hannah Chaplin
2013	Keala Settle	Hands on a Hardbody	Norma Valverde
2013	Kate Wetherhead	The Other Josh Cohen	Various Characters
2014
2014	**Anika Larsen**	**Beautiful: The Carole King Musical**	**Cynthia Weil**
2014	**Lauren Worsham**	**A Gentleman's Guide to Love and Murder**	**Phoebe D'Ysquith**
2014	Stephanie J. Block	Little Miss Sunshine	Sheryl Hoover
2014	Adriane Lenox	After Midnight	Various Characters
2014	Sydney Lucas	Fun Home	Small Alison Bechdel
2014	Laura Osnes	The Threepenny Opera	Polly Peachum
2014	Jennifer Simard	Disaster!	Sister Mary Downy
2015
2015	**Renée Elise Goldsberry**	**Hamilton**	**Angelica Schuyler**
2015	Carolee Carmello	Finding Neverland	Emma Wightwick du Maurier
2015	Tyne Daly	It Shoulda Been You	Judy Steinberg
2015	Elizabeth A. Davis	Allegro	Jenny Brinker
2015	Luba Mason	Pretty Filthy	Georgina Congress
2015	Nancy Opel	Honeymoon in Vegas	Bea Singer
2015	Elizabeth Stanley	On the Town	Claire De Loone
2016
2016	**Jane Krakowski**	**She Loves Me**	**Ilona Ritter**
2016	Danielle Brooks	The Color Purple	Sofia Johnson
2016	Alison Fraser	First Daughter Suite	Betty Ford / Nancy Reagan
2016	Rachel Bay Jones	Dear Evan Hansen	Heidi Hansen
2016	Mary Testa	First Daughter Suite	Barbara Bush
2017
2017	**Jenn Colella**	**Come from Away**	**Annette, Beverly Bass, and others**
2017	Kate Baldwin	Hello, Dolly!	Irene Molloy
2017	Stephanie J. Block	Falsettos	Trina
2017	Mary Beth Peil	Anastasia	Dowager Empress Maria Feodorovna
2017	Nora Schell	Spamilton	Various Characters
2018
2018	**Lindsay Mendez**	**Carousel**	**Carrie Pipperidge**
2018	Kenita R. Miller	Once On This Island	Mama Euralie
2018	Ashley Park	Mean Girls	Gretchen Weiners
2018	Diana Rigg	My Fair Lady	Mrs. Higgins
2018	Kate Rockwell	Mean Girls	Karen Smith
2019
2019	**Ali Stroker**	**Rodgers & Hammerstein's Oklahoma!**	**Ado Annie Carnes**
2019	Stephanie Hsu	Be More Chill	Christine Canigula
2019	Leslie Kritzer	Beetlejuice	Delia Deetz / Miss Argentina
2019	Soara-Joye Ross	Carmen Jones	Frankie
2019	Sarah Stiles	Tootsie	Sandy Lester
2019	Mary Testa	Rodgers & Hammerstein's Oklahoma!	Aunt Eller

=== 2020s ===
Year	Actress	Musical	Character
2020
2020	**Lauren Patten**	**Jagged Little Pill**	**Jo**
2020	Yesenia Ayala	West Side Story	Anita
2020	Paula Leggett Chase	The Unsinkable Molly Brown	Ensemble
2020	LaChanze	The Secret Life of Bees	August
2020	Alyse Alan Louis	Soft Power	Zoe/Hillary
2021	No awards: New York theatres shuttered, March 2020 to September 2021, due to the COVID-19 pandemic in New York City		
2022
2022	**Patti LuPone**	**Company**	**Joanne**
2022	Judy Kuhn	Assassins	Sara Jane Moore
2022	Tamika Lawrence	Black No More	Buni
2022	Bonnie Milligan	Kimberly Akimbo	Debra
2022	Jennifer Simard	Company	Sarah

== Multiple Wins ==
2 wins

- Laura Benanti
- Jane Krakowski
- Andrea Martin
- Karen Ziemba

== Multiple Nominations ==
5 nominations

- Andrea Martin
- Mary Testa
- Jennifer Simard

3 nominations

- Jane Krakowski
- Karen Ziemba
- Judy Kaye
- Leslie Kritzer
- Carolee Carmello

2 nominations

- Joanna Gleason
- Karen Mason
- Patti LuPone
- Barbara Walsh
- Michele Pawk
- Rachel York
- Randy Graff
- Debra Monk
- Kerry Butler
- Laura Benanti
- Nancy Opel
- Laura Osnes
- Jessie Mueller

== See also ==
- Laurence Olivier Award for Best Performance in a Supporting Role in a Musical
- Laurence Olivier Award for Best Actress in a Supporting Role in a Musical
- Tony Award for Best Performance by a Featured Actress in a Musical
