= Forbidden Broadway Strikes Back =

Musical

Forbidden Broadway
- Off-Broadway Playbill
- Music: Various
- Lyrics: Gerard Alessandrini
- Book: Gerard Alessandrini
- Basis: Broadway musicals
- Productions: 1996 Off-Broadway
- Awards: Drama Desk Award for Outstanding Lyrics

Forbidden Broadway Strikes Back is a version of Forbidden Broadway created by Gerard Alessandrini. It previewed September 5, 1996 and opened at the Triad Theater October 16, 1996. The show won Alessandrini the 1997 Drama Desk Award for Outstanding Lyrics and was nominated for the 1997 Drama Desk Award for Outstanding Revue.

It later moved to the basement of Ellen's Stardust Diner and, as is the show's tradition, spoofed Broadway's latest. An album was later released to accompany it, being the fourth volume of the FB franchise. The album was recorded and mixed by Cynthia Daniels at Giant Sound, Dec. 11-14, 1996, and released in 1997 after Original cast member David Hibbard moved on to Once Upon A Mattress and was replaced by Tom Plotkin. It bears the label "Another Unoriginal Cast Recording", since FB Strikes Back is technically the same show as the original, and features none of the original cast members.

The show and album parody shows like Show Boat, Beauty and the Beast, The King and I, Cats, Sunset Boulevard, and Rent, stars like Ann Reinking, Cameron Mackintosh, and Julie Andrews, and attack topics such as the Disneyfication of Broadway, the money the producers of the British shows make from souvenirs, the success of Cats, and the hype over Rent.

== Opening night cast ==
- Bryan Batt
- Donna English
- Christine Pedi (performed in other FB shows)
- David Hibbard replaced by Tom Plotkin

== Tracks ==
The numbers on the album are listed below, with each number's title, the original song's title, and the original composer. The "new" parody lyrics are by Gerard Alessandrini.

1. Parody Tonight ("Comedy Tonight") Oh What A Beautiful Moron ("Oh What A Beautiful Mornin'") One Foot More ("With One Look")
2. Show Boat Medley P.C. Show Boat ("Cotton Blossom") Make Believe ("Make Believe", Ol' Show Show Boat ("Ol' Man River")
3. Cameron Mackintosh-My Souvenir Things (My Favorite Things)
4. Elaine Stritch ("Zip")
5. Big ("Fun")
6. Bernadette ("Wunderbar", Porter) Mandy Is So Miscast ("So In Love", Porter)
7. The King Is Her ("The King And I", Whistle A Sondheim Tune; Shall We Boink? ("Shall We Dance?", with a brief snippet of "La Bamba" since the revival's star Lou Diamond Phillips was in the movie of the same name)
8. Disney On Broadway-Be Depressed ("Be Our Guest", Menken-Ashman)
9. Patti-Class ("Master Class")
10. Grease - Infomercial With Fran And Barry Weisler And Sally Struthers ("You're The One That I Want", "Look At Me I'm Sandra Dee", "There Are Worse Things We Could Do")
11. Stop Cats! - A Chorus Cat Meow! I Hope I Get It ("God I Hope I Get It", Hamlisch) Cats ("One", Hamlisch)
12. Ethel Merman And Sunset Boulevard You Just Can't Sing ("You're Just in Love")
13. Ann Reinking In Chicago ("Roxie" )
14. Kiss Me Kate - Corrective Casting - Jerry And Liza ("So Miscast") Julie Andrews Returns To Broadway
15. Le Julie Hot ("Le Jazz Hot")
16. A Spoonful Of Julie ("Spoonful of Sugar")
17. The Tony Nominating Committee: Victor/Ignor-Ee-Ya ("Victor/Victoria")
18. Crazy Girl ("Crazy World") Rent Medley (Rent, Out Tonight, Today 4 U, Seasons of Love, La Vie Boheme)
19. Finale-Something Wonderful
20. Encore-Ta-Ta-Folks
21. Bonus Track-Exit Music-Julie The Star! ("Star!")

== See also ==
- Forbidden Broadway
- Forbidden Broadway, Vol. 1
- Forbidden Broadway, Vol. 2
- Forbidden Broadway, Vol. 3
- Forbidden Hollywood
- Forbidden Broadway Cleans Up Its Act
- Forbidden Broadway: 20th Anniversary Edition
- Forbidden Broadway 2001: A Spoof Odyssey
- Forbidden Broadway: Special Victims Unit
- Forbidden Broadway: Rude Awakening
- Forbidden Broadway Goes to Rehab
