= Forbidden Broadway, Vol. 2 =

Forbidden Broadway, Volume 2 is the second album released for Forbidden Broadway (FB), an off-Broadway musical that spoofs Broadway's latest musicals. The album was recorded and mixed in February 1991 in New York at Sear Sound.

In the liner notes, Gerard Alessandrini, the show's creator, gives an insight on the show. He explains first why Volume 2 is labeled as the "Unoriginal Cast Recording": firstly, there is already an FB original cast recording; secondly, Alessandri points out that very little about FB is original. He also explains the purpose of releasing a new album: the show had had six different editions, so after many requests by fans, a second volume seemed appropriate. The album includes their best from 1985, 1986 and 1990. All the lyrics and sketches for Forbidden Broadway Vol. 2 (and all other editions) are written by Gerard Alessandrini.

This time, FB attacks shows such as Les Misérables, La Cage aux Folles, Sweeney Todd, The Phantom of the Opera, and Into the Woods, and stars such as Stephen Sondheim, Madonna, Bob Fosse, George Hearn, Mary Martin, Chita Rivera and Rita Moreno. It even spoofs major theatre topics, such as the high prices of tickets, the confusion between Chita Rivera and Rita Moreno, the deterioration of Broadway, and the difficulty of Sondheim's lyrics.

== Cast ==
- Gerard Alessandrini
- Toni DiBuono
- Philip Fortenberry (piano)
- John Freedson
- Phillip George
- Dorothy Kiara
- Kevin Ligon
- Roxie Lucas
- Michael McGrath
- Karen Murphy
- William Selby
- Linda Strasser

== Track listing ==
The musical numbers on the album are listed below. The names of the numbers are listed first, followed by the title of the spoofed song and the song's original composer, the latter two being in parentheses.

01 "Opening" (original, Alessandrini)
"Who Do They Know?" (original, Alessandrini)

02 "Forbidden Broadway Volume 2" (original, Alessandrini)

03 "Fugue For Scalpers" ("Fugue For Tinhorns")

04 "Patti LuPone" ("Anything Goes", Porter)
"I Get A Kick Out Of Me" ("I Get a Kick Out of You", Porter)

05 "Into The Words" ("Into the Woods" and "Weekend In The Country", Sondheim)

06 "Annie II" ("Tomorrow", Annie)

07 "M. Butterfly" ("Poor Butterfly")

08 "Madonna's Brain" ("The Rain in Spain", Loewe)

09 "Never, Never Panned" ("Never Never Land", Styne)

10 "Somewhat Overindulgent" ("Over the Rainbow", Arlen)

11 "Chita-Rita" ("America", Bernstein)

12 "I Ham What I Ham" ("I Am What I Am", Herman)

13 "Hey, Bob Fosse" ("Hey, Big Spender", Coleman-Fields)

14 "Almost Like Vegas In New York" ("Almost Like Being in Love", Loewe)

15 "Teeny Todd" ("Ballad Of Sweeney Todd", Sondheim)

16 "Liza" (original, Alessandrini, based on "Johnny One Note" by Rodgers and Hart)

17 "Ladies Who Screech" ("Ladies Who Lunch", Sondheim)

18 "Phantom Of The Musical" (original, Alessandri, based on "The Phantom of the Opera" by Andrew Lloyd Webber, and "O mio babbino caro")
Lloyd Webber ("Goldfinger", Barry-Newley-Bricusse)

19 "Give My Regards to Broadway" (Cohan)
George M ("Yankee Doodle Dandy", Cohan)

20 "More Miserable Sequence"

Les Miserable ("C'est Magnifique", Porter)
End Of The Play ("End Of The Day", Boubil-Schönberg)
I Dreamed A Show ("I Dreamed a Dream", Boubil-Schönberg)
Bring It Down ("Bring Him Home", Boubil-Schönberg)
Empty Songs, Empty Lyrics ("Empty Chairs at Empty Tables", Boublil-Schönberg)
Recitative (original, Alessandri)
Do You Hear The People Sing? ("Do You Hear the People Sing?", Boubil-Schönberg)

21 "Finale" (original, Alessandrini)

== See also ==
- Forbidden Broadway
- Forbidden Broadway, Vol. 1
- Forbidden Broadway, Vol. 3
- Forbidden Hollywood
- Forbidden Broadway Strikes Back
- Forbidden Broadway Cleans Up Its Act
- Forbidden Broadway: 20th Anniversary Edition
- Forbidden Broadway 2001: A Spoof Odyssey
- Forbidden Broadway: Special Victims Unit
- Forbidden Broadway: Rude Awakening
- Forbidden Broadway Goes to Rehab
