= Forbidden Broadway 2001: A Spoof Odyssey =

Theatrical production

Forbidden Broadway 2001: A Spoof Odyssey is the 21st century's first incarnation of the Off-Broadway revue Forbidden Broadway. It was conceived, created, and written by Gerard Alessandrini and satirizes Broadway's latest shows and stars. Phillip George co-directed with Alessandrini, with Catherine Stornetta as the musical director and piano accompanist. George contributed some of the ideas and dialogue for the sketches.

The show opened in December 2000 in the Stardust Theater (at Ellen's Stardust Diner). An album, the seventh in the series, accompanies the show, having been recorded and mixed in December 2000 by Cynthia Daniels at Sound on Sound in New York.

The show continues the tradition of commenting on current Broadway issues. It spoofs new shows, including Beauty and the Beast, Aida, and The Full Monty, and the revivals of Joseph and the Amazing Technicolor Dreamcoat, The Music Man, Cabaret, and Kiss Me, Kate; older shows, such as Annie Get Your Gun, Miss Saigon, and Les Misérables; and personalities, such as Gwen Verdon, Édith Piaf, Heather Headley, Marin Mazzie, Ben Brantley. The reviewer for CurtainUp noted that the "best and most original sequence is the one built around Contact. Business concerns again underpinned it."

== Cast ==
Source: New York Times

- Felicia Finley
- Danny Gurwin
- Tony Nation
- Christine Pedi

== Tracks ==
Source: AllMusic

A list of the songs on the Original Cast recording, with the songs they parody and the original composers listed.

- 01 "Forbidden Broadway 2001" ("Another Op'nin, Another Show", Cole Porter)
- 02 "Futuristic Stewardess/ Usherette" ("Come Fly with Me", Cahn - Van Heusen)
- 03 "Judi Dench" ("Why Can't the English?", Alan Jay Lerner- Frederick Loewe)
- 04 "Trouble in New York City" ("Trouble", Willson)
- 05 "The Music Man Revival 2001" ("Till There Was You", Willson)
- 06 "Cole Porter" ("You're the Top" and "From this Moment On", Porter)
- 07 "Kiss Me, Kate Revival 2001" ("Wunderbar", Porter)
- 08 "I Hate Ben - Marin Mazzie" ("I Hate Men", Porter)
- 09 "Cheryl Ladd in 'Annie Get Your Gun' " ("There's No Business Like Show Business", Irving Berlin)
- 10 "Miss Saigon Farewell" ("Why God Why?", Boubil - Schönberg)
- 11 "Saturday Night Fiasco" ("Stayin' Alive", B., M., and R. Gibb)
- 12 "Gwen Verdon and the Bob Fosse Dancers" ("I'm a Brass Band", Coleman - Fields; and "Steam Heat", Adler - Ross)
- 13 "Liza Minnelli 2001" (original, Alessandrini)

Alan Cumming in Cabaret ("Wilkommen", Kander - Ebb)

- 14 "Let's Ruin Times Square Again" ("Time Warp", Richard O'Brien)
- 15 "Ethel Merman and Elton John" ("I've Got Rhythm", Gershwin - Gershwin; and "Old Fashioned Wedding", Berlin)
- 16 "Beauty's Been Decreased" ("Beauty and the Beast", Menken - Ashman)
- 17 "Being Lupone" ("Being Alive", Sondheim)
- 18 "Sondheim's Blues" ("Buddy's Blues", Sondheim)
- 19 "Streisand's Farewell Tour" ("Happy Days are Here Again", Jack Yellen-Milton Ager; and Mame, Herman)
- 20 "Les Miz 2001"

Edith Piaf ("Milord", Monnot - Moustaki)
Javert ("Stars", Boubil - Schönberg - Kretzmer)

- 21 "Aida"

Amneris Intro ("Every Story is a Love Story", John - Rice)
Heather Hedley/ It's Cheesy ("Easy as Life", John - Rice)

- 22 "Elaborate Sets" (Aida Cont.) ("Elaborate Lives", John - Rice)
- 23 "Angela Lansbury" ("I Don't Want to Know", Herman)
- 24 "The Full Monty" ("Let it Go", Yazbek)
- 25 "76 Hit Shows" ("76 Trombones", Willson)
- 26 "Bows - Ta- Ta Folks" ("Another Op'nin, Another Show", Porter)
- 27 "Joseph and the Amazing High "C" "- Bonus Track ("Any Dream Will Do", Webber - Rice)

== See also ==
- Forbidden Broadway
- Forbidden Broadway, Vol. 1
- Forbidden Broadway, Vol. 2
- Forbidden Broadway, Vol. 3
- Forbidden Hollywood
- Forbidden Broadway Strikes Back
- Forbidden Broadway Cleans Up Its Act
- Forbidden Broadway: 20th Anniversary Edition
- Forbidden Broadway: Special Victims Unit
- Forbidden Broadway: Rude Awakening
- Forbidden Broadway Goes to Rehab
