= Forbidden Broadway, Vol. 1 =

Forbidden Broadway, known also as Forbidden Broadway, Volume 1, is the first album released by Gerard Alessandrini, the creator of Forbidden Broadway. Because the album features the five cast members from the original show, the album bears the label "Original Cast Recording."

The album, recorded June 28, 1984 at Time Capsules Studios in New York, spoofs Broadway's latest hits, including Amadeus, Evita, The Pirates of Penzance, and Annie and spoofs stars such as Carol Channing, Angela Lansbury, Ethel Merman, and Jerry Herman.

== Cast ==
- Gerard Alessandrini
- Fred Barton (piano)
- Bill Carmichael
- Nora Mae Lyng
- Chloe Webb

== Tracks ==
The musical numbers on the album are listed here. The number's title is given, with the song it spoofs and the original composer listed in parentheses. All the "new" parody lyrics are by Gerard Alessandrini.

01 Forbidden Broadway (original, Alessandrini)

02 Amadeus ("Non più andrai", Mozart)

03 Don't Cry For Me ("Don't Cry For Me, Argentina", Webber-Rice)

04 Annie's Favorite Showtune ("Tomorrow", Straus-Charnin)

05 Pirates Of Penzance Sequence (Gilbert-Sullivan)

"I Am A Kevin Kline" ("I Am A Pirate King")
"Oh, there is not one maiden breast" ("Oh, is there not one maiden breast?")
"Poor Warbling Star" ("Poor wand'ring one")

06 Be A Catholic ("Be Italian", Yeston)

07 Triplets (Schwartz-Dietz)

08 Bankable Stars ("Beautiful Girls", Sondheim)

09 I'm Entertainment ("That's Entertainment", Schwartz-Dietz)

10 Angela Lansbury Sequence

Mame (Herman)
If The Show Had Run Past Labor Day ("If He Walked Into My Life", Herman)

11 Audition Sequence

Soliloquy from Carousel (excerpt, Rodgers-Hammerstein)
I'm Sick Of Playing Their Songs ("They're Playing Our Song", Hamlisch-Sager)

12 Merman and Martin Sequence

It's De-Merman ("It's De-Lovely", Porter)
I'm Larry Hagman's Mother ("My Heart Belongs To Daddy", Porter)
Mutual Aggravation Society ("Mutual Admiration Society", Dubey-Karr)

13 Carol Channing Sequence

Call On Carol ("Call On Dolly", Herman)
"Dolly Is A Girl's Best Friend" ("Diamonds Are A Girl's Best Friend", Styne-Robin)
Oh, No, Carol! ("Hello, Dolly!", Herman)

14 Ambition ("Tradition", Bock-Harnick)

"Climb Ev'ry Mountain" (excerpt, Rodgers-Hammerstein)

15 Forbidden Broadway (reprise, Alessandrini)

== See also ==
- Forbidden Broadway
- Forbidden Broadway, Vol. 2
- Forbidden Broadway, Vol. 3
- Forbidden Hollywood
- Forbidden Broadway Strikes Back
- Forbidden Broadway Cleans Up Its Act
- Forbidden Broadway: 20th Anniversary Edition
- Forbidden Broadway 2001: A Spoof Odyssey
- Forbidden Broadway: Special Victims Unit
- Forbidden Broadway: Rude Awakening
- Forbidden Broadway Goes to Rehab

== Sources ==
- liner notes of album Forbidden Broadway
