= Jennifer Simard =

American actress

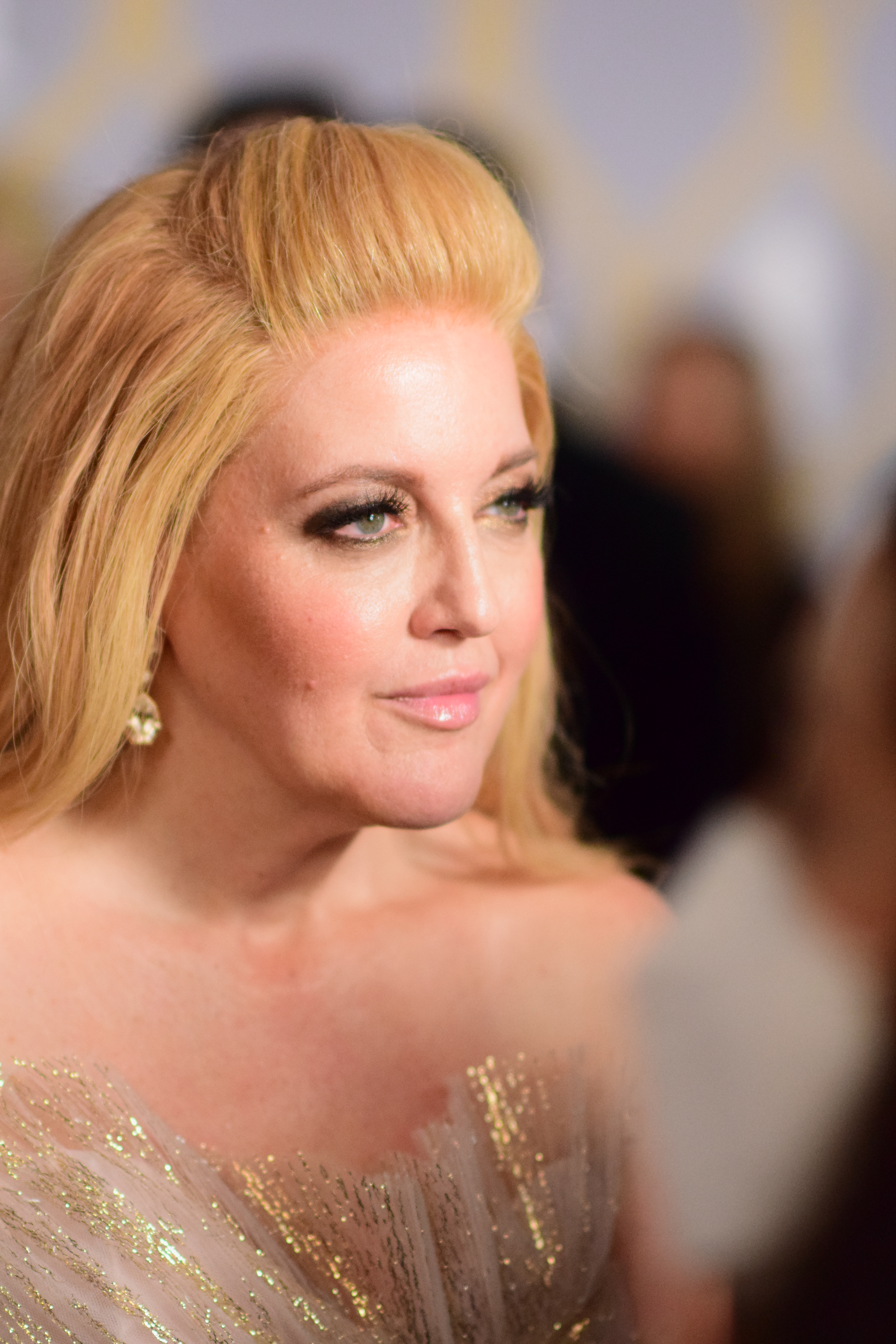
- Simard at the 2022 Tony Awards
- Born: August 8, 1970 (age 56); Manchester, New Hampshire, U.S.
- Education: Boston Conservatory (BFA)
- Occupations: Actress, singer
- Years active: 1992–present
- Height: 5 ft 2 in (157 cm)
- Spouse: Brad Robertson (m. 2004; div. 2024)
- Website: jennifersimard.com

Jennifer Jean Simard (born August 8, 1970) is an American actress and singer known primarily for her work in musical theatre. A three-time Tony Award nominee, she rose to prominence with roles in Broadway and Off-Broadway productions in the 2000s, such as I Love You, You're Perfect, Now Change, The Thing About Men and Forbidden Broadway: Special Victims Unit, nominated for a Drama Desk Award and Lucille Lortel Award for the latter.

In 2016, Simard starred as Sister Mary Downey in Disaster!, receiving rave reviews and her first nomination for Tony Award for Best Featured Actress in a Musical. Between 2020 and 2022, she starred as Sarah in the Broadway revival of Company for which she received her second Tony nomination. Other Broadway credits include the 2017 revival of Hello, Dolly!, Mean Girls, and Once Upon a One More Time. She received her third Tony nomination for her performance as lead role Helen Sharp in Death Becomes Her.

Simard's screen credits include Somewhere in Queens, Law & Order and Younger.

== Life and career ==
Simard is from Litchfield, New Hampshire. She studied at the Boston Conservatory of Music and Hunter College. After studying, Simard moved to New York, where she appeared in Forbidden Broadway '93.

She made her Broadway debut in The 25th Annual Putnam County Spelling Bee and later performed in the Broadway productions of Shrek The Musical and Sister Act.

Simard garnered Drama Desk Award nominations for Outstanding Featured Actress in a Musical for her roles in I Love You, You're Perfect, Now Change, The Thing About Men, and Forbidden Broadway: Special Victims Unit (2005).

She originated the role of Sister Mary Downey in the 2016 Broadway musical Disaster!; her performance earned her a Tony Award nomination, as well as a Drama League Award nomination, in 2016. She was also nominated for a Drama Desk Award for the role, which she performed off-Broadway in 2014.

She appeared on Broadway as Ernestina in the 2017 revival of Hello, Dolly!, starring Bette Midler and David Hyde Pierce. Simard played Miss Hannigan in the St. Louis Muny production of Annie from July 18–25, 2018. In August 2018, it was announced that Simard would join the Tony-nominated musical Mean Girls as Mrs. Heron, Ms. Norbury, and Mrs. George that September, replacing Kerry Butler. Her last performance was on December 8, 2019.

In October 2019, it was announced that Simard would join the gender-swapped revival of Company as Sarah at the Bernard B. Jacobs Theatre. She returned to the production after the pandemic, starring as Sarah over the course of 2020 to 2022. Between February 26 to March 6, 2022, she took over the role of Joanne due to the unavailability of Patti LuPone. At the 75th Tony Awards Simard received her second nomination for Best Performance by a Featured Actress in a Musical.

In 2023, she originated the role of Stepmother in the Britney Spears jukebox musical Once Upon a One More Time at the Marquis Theatre.

In 2024, Simard starred in the stage adaptation of Death Becomes Her as Helen Sharp, opposite co-lead Megan Hilty as Madeline Ashton. The production's out of town tryout ran at Chicago's Cadillac Palace Theatre from April 30 to June 2, 2024. Simard and Hilty led the production on Broadway, at the Lunt-Fontanne Theatre, which began previews on October 23, 2024, before opening on November 21, 2024. Simard received a Tony nomination for her portrayal of Helen.

=== Television and film ===
Simard's television roles include appearances in Younger, The Good Wife, Law & Order: Special Victims Unit, Law & Order, Girls5eva, and The King of Queens. She also appeared in the 2000 comedy film The Flintstones in Viva Rock Vegas.

== Personal life ==
On October 3, 2004, Simard married Brad Robertson, whom she met when he was the light board operator for the off-Broadway production of I Love You, You're Perfect, Now Change. The couple divorced in 2024.

== Theater ==
Year	Title	Role	Theatre	Director(s)	Ref.
1996	I Love You, You're Perfect, Now Change	Woman #1	Westside Theatre	Joel Bishoff	
2003	The Thing About Men	Woman	Promenade Theatre		
2004	Forbidden Broadway: Special Victims Unit	Various Characters	Douglas Fairbanks Theatre	Gerard Alessandrini and Phillip George	
2006	The 25th Annual Putnam County Spelling Bee	Rona Lisa Peretti	US National Tour	James Lapine	
2007	The 25th Annual Putnam County Spelling Bee	Rona Lisa Peretti (replacement)	Circle in the Square Theatre	James Lapine	
2008	Shrek the Musical	Queen Lillian/Wicked Witch/ Magic Mirror Assistant	Broadway Theatre	Jason Moore	
2011	Sister Act	Ensemble	Broadway Theatre	Jerry Zaks	
2013	Disaster!	Sister Mary Downy	St. Luke’s Theatre	Jack Plotnick	
2016	Disaster!	Sister Mary Downy	Nederlander Theatre	Jack Plotnick	
2017–18	Hello, Dolly!	Ernestina	Shubert Theatre	Jerry Zaks	
2018	Annie	Miss Hannigan	The Muny		
2018–19	Mean Girls	Mrs. Heron/Ms. Norbury/ Mrs. George (replacement)	August Wilson Theatre	Casey Nicholaw	
2020	Company	Sarah u/s Joanne	Bernard B. Jacobs Theatre	Marianne Elliott	
2021–22	Company	Sarah u/s Joanne	Bernard B. Jacobs Theatre	Marianne Elliott	
2022	Company	Joanne (temporary replacement)	Bernard B. Jacobs Theatre	Marianne Elliott	
2022	Company	Sarah u/s Joanne	Bernard B. Jacobs Theatre	Marianne Elliott	
2023	Once Upon a One More Time	Stepmother	Marquis Theatre	Keone Madrid and Mari Madrid	
2023	Hello, Dolly!	Dolly Gallagher-Levi	Renaissance Theatre	Michael Thomas	
2024	Death Becomes Her	Helen Sharp	Cadillac Palace Theatre	Christopher Gattelli	
2024–26	Death Becomes Her	Helen Sharp	Lunt-Fontanne Theatre	Christopher Gattelli	
2025	Pete 'n' Keely	Keely Stevens	Concert at Carnegie Hall	Mark Waldrop	
2026	Schmigadoon!	Mildred Layton (replacement)	Nederlander Theatre	Christopher Gattelli	

== Filmography ==
=== Film ===
Year	Title	Role	Ref.
2000	The Flintstones in Viva Rock Vegas	Bride-To-Be	
2001	Wish You Were Dead	Cake Girl	
2013	Shrek the Musical	Wicked Witch	
2014	Non-Stop	Maggie Evans (uncredited)	
2015	Sisters	Pet Activist at Party	
2022	Somewhere in Queens	Patsy	

=== Television ===
Year	Title	Role	Notes	Ref.
1999	The King of Queens	Paula	Episode: "Best Man"	
2006	Law & Order	Danielle Andreas	Episode: "Invaders"	
2008	Law & Order: Special Victims Unit	Debra Jackson	Episode: "Trade"	
2015	The Good Wife	Janie Mullaby	Episode: "Payback"	
2016	Younger	Sherry	Episode: "Last Days of Books"	
2021	Girls5eva	Daphne	Episode: "Catskills"	

== Awards and nominations ==
Year	Award ceremony	Category	Show	Result	Ref.
1997	Drama Desk Award	Outstanding Featured Actress in a Musical	I Love You, You're Perfect, Now Change	Nominated	
2004	Drama Desk Award	Outstanding Featured Actress in a Musical	The Thing About Men	Nominated	
2005	Drama Desk Award	Outstanding Featured Actress in a Musical	Forbidden Broadway: Special Victims Unit	Nominated	
2005	Lucille Lortel Award	Outstanding Featured Actress	Forbidden Broadway: Special Victims Unit	Nominated	
2014	Drama Desk Award	Outstanding Featured Actress in a Musical	Disaster!	Nominated	
2014	Drama League Award	Distinguished Performance Award	Disaster!	Nominated	
2016	Drama League Award	Distinguished Performance Award	Disaster!	Nominated	
2016	Tony Award	Best Performance by a Featured Actress in a Musical	Disaster!	Nominated	
2022	Tony Award	Best Performance by a Featured Actress in a Musical	Company	Nominated	
2022	Drama Desk Award	Outstanding Featured Actress in a Musical	Company	Nominated	
2025	Drama Desk Award	Drama Desk Award for Outstanding Lead Performance in a Musical	Death Becomes Her	Nominated	
2025	Drama League Award	Distinguished Performance Award	Death Becomes Her	Nominated	
2025	Outer Critics Circle Awards	Outstanding Lead Performer in a Broadway Musical	Death Becomes Her	Nominated	
2025	Grammy Award	Best Musical Theater Album	Death Becomes Her	Nominated	
2025	Tony Award	Best Performance by an Actress in a Leading Role in a Musical	Death Becomes Her	Nominated	
2025	Broadway.com Audience Choice Award	Favorite Leading Actress in a Musical	Death Becomes Her	Nominated	
2025	Broadway.com Audience Choice Award	Favorite Diva Performance	Death Becomes Her	Nominated	
2025	Broadway.com Audience Choice Award	Favorite Funny Performance	Death Becomes Her	Nominated	
2025	Broadway.com Audience Choice Award	Favorite Onstage Pair (with Megan Hilty)	Death Becomes Her	Won	
