= Drama Desk Award for Outstanding Lyrics =

Musical theatre award in New York, US

- Awarded for: Outstanding Lyrics
- Location: New York City
- Country: United States
- Presented by: Drama Desk
- First award: 1969
- Currently held by: Jim Barne and Kit Buchan, Two Strangers (Carry a Cake Across New York) (2026)
- Website: dramadesk.org (defunct)

The Drama Desk Award for Outstanding Lyrics is an annual award presented by Drama Desk in recognition of achievements in musical theatre across collective Broadway, off-Broadway and off-off-Broadway productions in New York City.

Stephen Sondheim holds the record for most wins and nominations for the award, with ten wins out of twelve nominations.

== Winners and nominees ==
Key

and bold indicates the winner.

=== 1960s ===
Year	Lyricist	Production	Ref.
1969
1969	**George Haimsohn & Robin Miller**	**Dames at Sea**	
1969	**Fred Ebb**	**Zorba**	

=== 1970s ===
Year	Lyricist	Production	Ref.
1970
1970	**Stephen Sondheim**	**Company**	
1970	**Bertolt Brecht**	**Mahagonny**	
1971
1971	**Stephen Sondheim**	**Follies**	
1972
1972	**John Guare**	**Two Gentlemen of Verona**	
1973
1973	**Stephen Sondheim**	**A Little Night Music**	
1974
1974	**Al Carmines**	**The Faggot**	
1975
1975	**Charlie Smalls**	**The Wiz**	
1975	Gene Curty, Nitra Scharfman & Chuck Strand	The Lieutenant	
1975	Jerry Herman	Mack and Mabel	
1975	Fred Silver	In Gay Company	
1976
1976	**Edward Kleban & Marvin Hamlisch**	**A Chorus Line**	
1976	Leonard Bernstein	1600 Pennsylvania Avenue	
1976	Bill Heyer & Hank Beebe	Tuscaloosa's Calling Me	
1976	Stephen Sondheim	Pacific Overtures	
1977
1977	**Martin Charnin**	**Annie**	
1977	Alfred Uhry	The Robber Bridegroom	
1978
1978	**Carol Hall**	**The Best Little Whorehouse in Texas**	
1978	Elizabeth Swados	Runaways	
1979
1979	**Stephen Sondheim**	**Sweeney Todd: The Demon Barber of Fleet Street**	
1979	Gretchen Cryer	I'm Getting My Act Together and Taking It on the Road	

=== 1980s ===
Year	Lyricist	Production	Ref.
1980
1980	**Tim Rice**	**Evita**	
1980	Steve Brown	Strider	
1981	—N/a		
1982
1982	**Stephen Sondheim**	**Merrily We Roll Along**	
1982	**Maury Yeston**	**Nine**	
1982	Tom Eyen	Dreamgirls	
1982	Jim Wann	Pump Boys and Dinettes	
1983
1983	**Howard Ashman**	**Little Shop of Horrors**	
1983	Michael Colby	Charlotte Sweet	
1983	T.S. Eliot	Cats	
1983	Des McAnuff	Death of Von Richthofen	
1984
1984	**Stephen Sondheim**	**Sunday in the Park with George**	
1984	Jerry Herman	La Cage aux Folles	
1984	Richard Maltby Jr.	Baby	
1984	Garry Trudeau	Doonesbury	
1985
1985	**Roger Miller**	**Big River**	
1985	Jerry Colker	3 Guys Naked from the Waist Down	
1985	Ellen Fitzhugh	Grind	
1986, 1987	—N/a		
1988
1988	**Stephen Sondheim**	**Into the Woods**	
1988	Barry Harman	Romance/Romance	
1989	—N/a		

=== 1990s ===
Year	Lyricist	Production	Ref.
1990
1990	**David Zippel**	**City of Angels**	
1990	Richard Maltby Jr.	Closer Than Ever	
1990	Chet Forrest, Bob Wright & Maury Yeston	Grand Hotel	
1991
1991	**William Finn**	**Falsettoland**	
1991	Marsha Norman	The Secret Garden	
1991	Stephen Sondheim	Assassins	
1992
1992	**Susan Birkenhead**	**Jelly's Last Jam**	
1992	Erik Frandsen, Michael Garin, Robert Hipkins & Paul Lockheart	Song of Singapore	
1993
1993	**Joel Paley**	**Ruthless!**	
1993	Douglas Bernstein & Denis Markell	A Backer's Audition	
1993	Arthur Perlman	Wings	
1993	David Zippel	The Goodbye Girl	
1994
1994	**Stephen Sondheim**	**Passion**	
1994	Howard Ashman & Tim Rice	Beauty and the Beast	
1994	Michael John LaChiusa	Hello Again	
1995	—N/a		
1996
1996	**Jonathan Larson**	**Rent**	
1996	Adam Guettel	Floyd Collins	
1996	Laurence Klavan	Bed and Sofa	
1996	Mark Campbell	Splendora	
1996	Richard Maltby Jr.	Big	
1997
1997	**Gerard Alessandrini**	**Forbidden Broadway Strikes Back**	
1997	Brian Crawley	Violet	
1997	Mark Waldrop	When Pigs Fly	
1998
1998	**Lynn Ahrens**	**Ragtime**	
1998	Stephen Trask	Hedwig and the Angry Inch	
1998	Susan Birkenhead	Triumph of Love	
1999
1999	**Gerard Alessandrini**	**Forbidden Broadway Cleans Up Its Act**	
1999	Jason Robert Brown	Parade	
1999	William Finn	A New Brain	

=== 2000s ===
Year	Lyricist	Production	Ref.
2000
2000	**Stephen Sondheim**	**Saturday Night**	
2000	Boyd Graham	The Big Bang	
2000	Jordan Allen-Dutton, Jason Catalano & GQ	The Bomb-itty of Errors	
2000	Andrew Lippa	The Wild Party	
2001
2001	**Mel Brooks**	**The Producers**	
2001	Kirsten Childs	The Bubbly Black Girl Sheds Her Chameleon Skin	
2001	Mark Hollmann & Greg Kotis	Urinetown	
2001	Ed Kleban	A Class Act	
2001	Laurence O'Keefe	Bat Boy: The Musical	
2001	David Yazbek	The Full Monty	
2002
2002	**Jason Robert Brown**	**The Last Five Years**	
2002	Craig Carnelia	Sweet Smell of Success	
2002	Jonathan Larson	Tick, Tick... BOOM!	
2002	Kevin Murphy	Reefer Madness	
2002	Dick Scanlan	Thoroughly Modern Millie	
2002	Ben Schatz	Dragapella Starring The Kinsey Sicks	
2003
2003	**Marc Shaiman & Scott Wittman**	**Hairspray**	
2003	Tim Acito & Alexander Dinelaris	Zanna, Don't!	
2003	Lynn Ahrens	A Man of No Importance	
2003	Craig Carnelia	Imaginary Friends	
2003	Robert Lopez & Jeff Marx	Avenue Q	
2003	Jeremy Sams & Didier van Cauwelaert	Amour	
2004
2004	**Stephen Schwartz**	**Wicked**	
2004	Joanne Bogart	The Musical of Musicals (The Musical!)	
2004	Boy George	Taboo	
2004	Sean Hartley	Cupid and Psyche	
2004	Joel Higgins	Johnny Guitar	
2005
2005	**Eric Idle**	**Spamalot**	
2005	Gary Adler & Michael Patrick Walker	Altar Boyz	
2005	Douglas J. Cohen	Children's Letters to God	
2005	Rick Crom	Newsical	
2005	William Finn	The 25th Annual Putnam County Spelling Bee	
2005	David Yazbek	Dirty Rotten Scoundrels	
2006
2006	**Lisa Lambert & Greg Morrison**	**The Drowsy Chaperone**	
2006	Chad Beguelin	The Wedding Singer	
2006	Mark Campbell	Songs from an Unmade Bed	
2006	Ryan Cunningham	I Love You Because	
2006	Michael Korie	Grey Gardens	
2006	Michael John LaChiusa	See What I Wanna See	
2007
2007	**Steven Sater**	**Spring Awakening**	
2007	Fred Ebb, Rupert Holmes & John Kander	Curtains	
2007	Lin-Manuel Miranda	In the Heights	
2007	Nell Benjamin & Laurence O'Keefe	Legally Blonde	
2007	Mark Eaton, Elaina Newport & William Strauss	Capitol Steps	
2007	Marc Shaiman & Scott Wittman	Martin Short: Fame Becomes Me	
2008
2008	**Stew**	**Passing Strange**	
2008	Lynn Ahrens	The Glorious Ones	
2008	Mel Brooks	Young Frankenstein	
2008	John Bucchino	A Catered Affair	
2008	Ben Katchor	The Slug Bearers of Kayrol Island	
2008	Jason Loewith & Joshua Schmidt	Adding Machine	
2009
2009	**Stephen Sondheim**	**Road Show**	
2009	Neil Bartram	The Story of My Life	
2009	Jason Robert Brown	13	
2009	Marcy Heisler	Dear Edwina	
2009	David Lindsay-Abaire	Shrek the Musical	
2009	Dolly Parton	9 to 5	

=== 2010s ===
Year	Lyricist	Production	Ref.
2010
2010	**Fred Ebb & John Kander**	**The Scottsboro Boys**	
2010	Rick Crom	Newsical	
2010	Kevin Del Aguila	Click, Clack, Moo: Cows That Type	
2010	Adèle Anderson & Dillie Keane	Fascinating Aïda	
2010	Andrew Lippa	The Addams Family	
2010	David Zellnik	Yank!	
2011
2011	**Trey Parker, Robert Lopez & Matt Stone**	**The Book of Mormon**	
2011	Rick Crom	Newsical The Musical – Full Spin Ahead	
2011	Jack Lechner	The Kid	
2011	Adam Mathias	See Rock City & Other Destinations	
2011	Glenn Slater	Sister Act	
2011	Marc Shaiman & Scott Wittman	Catch Me If You Can	
2012
2012	**Glen Hansard & Markéta Irglová**	**Once**	
2012	Don Black	Bonnie & Clyde	
2012	Jack Feldman	Newsies	
2012	Joy Gregory & Gunnar Madsen	The Shaggs: Philosophy of the World	
2012	Michael John LaChiusa	Queen of the Mist	
2012	Maury Yeston	Death Takes a Holiday	
2013
2013	**Tim Minchin**	**Matilda the Musical**	
2013	Amanda Green	Hands on a Hardbody	
2013	Green & Lin-Manuel Miranda	Bring It On: The Musical	
2013	Michael John LaChiusa	Giant	
2013	Dave Malloy	Natasha, Pierre and the Great Comet of 1812	
2013	Steve Rosen & David Rossmer	The Other Josh Cohen	
2014
2014	**Robert L. Freedman & Steven Lutvak**	**A Gentleman's Guide to Love and Murder**	
2014	Howard Ashman, Chad Beguelin & Tim Rice	Aladdin	
2014	Jason Robert Brown	The Bridges of Madison County	
2014	Michael Friedman	Love's Labour's Lost	
2014	Michael Korie	Far from Heaven	
2014	Lisa Kron	Fun Home	
2015
2015	**Lin-Manuel Miranda**	**Hamilton**	
2015	Jason Robert Brown	Honeymoon in Vegas	
2015	Fred Ebb	The Visit	
2015	Michael Friedman	The Fortress of Solitude	
2015	Karey & Wayne Kirkpatrick	Something Rotten!	
2015	Benjamin Scheuer	The Lion	
2016
2016	**Benj Pasek & Justin Paul**	**Dear Evan Hansen**	
2016	Sara Bareilles	Waitress	
2016	Glenn Slater	School of Rock	
2016	Michael John LaChiusa	First Daughter Suite	
2017
2017	**David Yazbek**	**The Band's Visit**	
2017	Gerard Alessandrini	Spamilton	
2017	GQ & JAQ	Othello: The Remix	
2017	Michael Korie	War Paint	
2017	David Hein & Irene Sankoff	Come from Away	
2018
2018	**Peter Kellogg**	**Desperate Measures**	
2018	Nell Benjamin	Mean Girls	
2018	Quiara Alegría Hudes & Erin McKeown	Miss You Like Hell	
2018	Helen Park & Max Vernon	KPOP	
2019
2019	**David Yazbek**	**Tootsie**	
2019	Chad Beguelin	The Prom	
2019	Andrew R. Butler	Rags Parkland Sings the Songs of the Future	
2019	Joe Iconis	Be More Chill	
2019	Peter Mills	The Hello Girls	

=== 2020s ===
Year	Lyricist	Production	Ref.
2020
2020	**Michael R. Jackson**	**A Strange Loop**	
2020	Susan Birkenhead	The Secret Life of Bees	
2020	Adam Gwon	Scotland, PA	
2020	Joanne Sydney Lessner & Joshua Rosenblum	Einstein's Dreams	
2020	Dave Malloy	Octet	
2020	Mark Saltzman	Romeo & Bernadette	
2021	No awards: New York theatres shuttered, March 2020 to September 2021, due to the COVID-19 pandemic in New York City		
2022
2022	**Toby Marlow and Lucy Moss**	**Six**	
2022	Amanda Green	Mr. Saturday Night	
2022	Taylor Mac	The Hang	
2022	David Lindsay-Abaire	Kimberly Akimbo	
2022	Lynn Nottage	Intimate Apparel	
2022	Shaina Taub	Suffs	
2023
2023	**Scott Wittman and Marc Shaiman**	**Some Like It Hot**	
2023	Brandy Clark and Shane McAnally	Shucked	
2023	Jonathan Hogue	Stranger Sings! The Parody Musical	
2023	Michael R. Jackson	White Girl in Danger	
2023	Adam Schlesinger and Sarah Silverman	The Bedwetter	
2024	**David Yazbek and Erik Della Penna**	**Dead Outlaw**	
2024	Rachel Bloom, Eli Bolin, and Jack Dolgen	Rachel Bloom: Death, Let Me Do My Show	
2024	Jason Robert Brown	The Connector	
2024	Michael R. Jackson	Teeth	
2024	Jamestown Revival (Jonathan Clay and Zach Chance) and Justin Levine	The Outsiders	
2025
2025	**Will Aronson and Hue Park**	**Maybe Happy Ending**	
2025	Gerard Alessandrini	Forbidden Broadway: Merrily We Stole a Song	
2025	David Cumming, Felix Hagan, Natasha Hodgson, and Zoë Roberts	Operation Mincemeat	
2025	Adam Gwon	All the World's a Stage	
2025	Marla Mindelle and Philip Drennen	The Big Gay Jamboree	
2025	Luis Quintero	Medea: Re-Versed	
2026
2026	**Jim Barne and Kit Buchan**	**Two Strangers (Carry a Cake Across New York)**	
2026	Dahlak Brathwaite	Try/Step/Trip	
2026	Ethan Lipton	The Seat of Our Pants	
2026	Douglas Lyons	Beau the Musical	
2026	Brian Quijada and Nygel D. Robinson	Mexodus	

== Multiple wins ==
10 wins

- Stephen Sondheim

3 wins

- David Yazbek

2 wins

- Gerard Alessandrini
- Fred Ebb
- Marc Shaiman
- Scott Wittman

== Multiple nominations ==
12 nominations

- Stephen Sondheim

6 nominations

- Jason Robert Brown

5 nominations

- Michael John LaChiusa
- David Yazbek

4 nominations

- Fred Ebb
- Marc Shaiman
- Scott Wittman

3 nominations

- Lynn Ahrens
- Gerard Alessandrini
- Howard Ashman
- Chad Beguelin
- Rick Crom
- William Finn
- Amanda Green
- Michael R. Jackson
- Michael Korie
- Richard Maltby, Jr.
- Lin-Manuel Miranda
- Tim Rice
- Maury Yeston

2 nominations

- Susan Birkenhead
- Mel Brooks
- Mark Campbell
- Craig Carnelia
- Michael Friedman
- Jerry Herman
- John Kander
- Jonathan Larson
- David Lindsay-Abaire
- Andrew Lippa
- Robert Lopez
- Dave Malloy
- Laurence O'Keefe
- Glenn Slater
- David Zippel

== See also ==
- Tony Award for Best Original Score
- Outer Critics Circle Award for Outstanding New Score
