= Forbidden Broadway: Rude Awakening =

Forbidden Broadway
- Cast album cover
- Music: Various
- Lyrics: Gerard Alessandrini
- Book: Gerard Alessandrini
- Basis: Broadway musicals
- Productions: 2007 Off-Broadway

Forbidden Broadway: Rude Awakening is the 2007 incarnation of Gerard Alessandrini's long-running hit Off-Broadway musical revue Forbidden Broadway, which parodies notable current Broadway and Off-Broadway musicals.

Rude Awakening opened on October 2, 2007, at New York's 47th Street Theatre and closed on March 24, 2008. The show was conceived, created and written by Alessandrini and was directed by Alessandrini and Phillip George.

The musicals parodied in Rude Awakening include Wicked, A Chorus Line, Les Misérables, The Little Mermaid, Grey Gardens, Chicago, Spring Awakening, Jersey Boys, Spamalot and Mary Poppins.

== Opening night cast ==
- Jared Bradshaw
- Janet Dickinson
- James Donegan
- Valerie Fagan
- Steve Saari, piano

== Replacements and understudies ==
- Michael West, replaced James Donegan
- Megan Lewis, replaced Janet Dickinson
- William Selby, dance captain/male understudy
- Gina Kreizemar, female understudy

== Album ==
The tracks featured on the cast recording are:

1. It's D'sgusting (It's D'Lovely)
2. Forbidden Broadway: Rude Awakening
3. Medley: Marry Poppins: Chim Chim Cher-ee/Supercalifragilisticexpialadocious
4. Curtains For Curtains (Show People)
5. Medley: Company: Company/Being Alive
6. Grey Gardens (The Revolutionary Costume For Today)
7. Medley: Jersey Goys: Sherry/Walk Like a Man/Big Girls Don't Cry
8. The Be-Littled Mermaid (Part Of Your World)
9. Medley: Spamalot: Camelot/The Song That Goes Like This
10. Medley: Even More Miserables: C'est Magnifique/Master Of the House/On My Own
11. Medley: A Chorus Line: God, I Hope I Get It/One
12. You Can't Stop the Camp (You Can't Stop the Beat)
13. Medley: Wicked & the Flying Monkeys: Defying Gravity/Don't Monkey With Broadway
14. Medley: Spring Awakening: Mack the Knife/Mama Who Bore Me/Totally F***ed
15. Finale (What I Did For Love)
16. Medley: Yoko Ono On Broadway: Oh, What a Beautiful Mornin'/Oklahoma!/Imagine
17. Medley: Sour Charity: Hey Big Spender/If They Could See Me Now/There's Gotta Be Something Better Than This/I'm a Brass Band
18. Chicago-Give 'Em the Old Star Replacement (Razzle Dazzle)
19. Medley: Light In the Piazza: Statues & Stories/Say It Somehow/Tonight
20. The Impossible Song (The Impossible Dream)
21. Medley: Doubt: Who's Afraid Of the Big Bad Wolf/Shout

== See also ==
- Forbidden Broadway
- Forbidden Broadway, Vol. 1
- Forbidden Broadway, Vol. 2
- Forbidden Broadway, Vol. 3
- Forbidden Hollywood
- Forbidden Broadway Strikes Back
- Forbidden Broadway Cleans Up Its Act
- Forbidden Broadway: 20th Anniversary Edition
- Forbidden Broadway 2001: A Spoof Odyssey
- Forbidden Broadway: Special Victims Unit
- Forbidden Broadway Goes to Rehab
