= Forbidden Broadway: Special Victims Unit =

Forbidden Broadway
- Special Victims Unit
- Off-Broadway poster
- Music: Various
- Lyrics: Gerard Alessandrini
- Book: Gerard Alessandrini
- Basis: Broadway musicals
- Productions: 2004 Off-Broadway

Forbidden Broadway: Special Victims Unit (Forbidden Broadway: SVU for short) is the ninth show in Gerard Alessandrini's collection of musical revues. It ran Off-Broadway from 2004 to 2007.

== Production ==
Forbidden Broadway: Special Victims Unit opened on December 16, 2004 at the Douglas Fairbanks Theatre, closed on May 29, 2005 and reopened at the 47th Street Theatre on June 24, 2005, finally closing on April 15, 2007.

The "Forbidden Broadway" series entered its twenty-fifth year running off-Broadway. The show was conceived, created and written by Alessandrini and is co-directed by Alessandrini and Phillip George. George also contributes some of the parody ideas and sketches.

The revue continues the series' tradition of spoofing contemporary Broadway shows and personalities, including the shows Thoroughly Modern Millie, Hairspray, Wicked, Avenue Q, Cabaret, Fiddler on the Roof, La Cage aux Folles, and Bombay Dreams, and personalities Christina Applegate, Robert Goulet, Cherry Jones, and Kathleen Turner.

== Cast ==
- Ron Bohmer
- Jason Mills
- Megan Lewis
- Jennifer Simard
- Jeanne Montano
- David Caldwell (piano)

This cast is featured on the show's accompanying album of the same title, the eighth volume in the series. The album also features a guest appearance by Christine Pedi.

== CD tracks ==
Source for song list:Amazon

The songs on the Original Cast album are listed below, with the song they parody and the original composer.

- 01 "The Crime Scene" - Thirty Years Old Tomorrow ("Tomorrow", Charnin- Strouse); On Broadway ("On Broadway")
- 02 "Forbidden Broadway: Special Victims Unit" (rewrite of Forbidden Broadway, Volume 2", Alessandrini)
- 03 "Bombay Wet Dreams" - The Lullaby of Bombay ("The Lullaby of Broadway", Warren- Dubin); Hooray for Bollywood ("Hooray for Hollywood")
- 04 "You Gotta Get a Puppet" ("You Gotta Get a Gimmick", Sondheim)
- 05 "It Sucks to be Us" ("It Sucks to be Me")
- 06 "Thoroughly Perky Millie" ("Thoroughly Modern Millie")
- 07 "Movin' Out" ("My Life", Joel)
- 08 "Night Mother" ("That's Amore"); ("Ma, He's Making Eyes at Me")
- 09 "Welcome to the Tonys ("Welcome to the Sixties")
- 10 "The Boy Who's Odd" ("I Go To Rio"); ("Everything Old is New Again")
- 11 "I Love Patti" ("I Love Paris")
- 12 "Das Mel Brooks Song" ("Haben Sie Gehört das Deutsche Band?", Brooks)
- 13 "Wickeder" - Glad that You're Popular ("Popular", Schwartz); Defying Chenoweth ("Defying Gravity", Schwartz)
- 14 "No Leading Lady Tonight" ("Luck be a Lady Tonight", Loesser)
- 15 "Forbidden Assassins" ("Unworthy of Your Love", Sondheim)
- 16 "Julie Andrews Hosts PBS- The American Musical: The Next Hundred Years" ("Do- Re- Mi", Rodgers- Hammerstein); ("Fun, Fun, Fun")
- 17 "I Am My Own Cast" ("Wilkommen", Kander- Ebb)
- 18 "Mamma Mia- "Dancing Queen"
- 19 "Fiddler with no Jew" - Direction ("Tradition", Bock- Harnick); Cashmaker ("Matchmaker", Bock- Harnick); ("Sabbath Prayer", Bock- Harnick)
- 20 "Harvey Fierstein as Tevye" ("If I Were a Rich Man", Bock- Harnick)
- 21 "Bernadette Peters in Gypsy" ("Rose's Turn", Styne- Sondheim)
- 22 "Ethel Merman & Friends" ("There's No Business Like Show Business", Berlin)
- 23 Encore: "La Cage Aw Full" - "La Cage Aw Full" ("La Cage Aux Folles", Herman); "The Golden Age" ("The Best of Times", Herman)

== See also ==
- Forbidden Broadway
- Forbidden Broadway, Vol. 1
- Forbidden Broadway, Vol. 2
- Forbidden Broadway, Vol. 3
- Forbidden Hollywood
- Forbidden Broadway Strikes Back
- Forbidden Broadway Cleans Up Its Act
- Forbidden Broadway: 20th Anniversary Edition
- Forbidden Broadway 2001: A Spoof Odyssey
- Forbidden Broadway: Rude Awakening
- Forbidden Broadway Goes to Rehab
