= Jason Graae =

American actor (born 1958)

- Born: May 15, 1958 (age 68); Chicago, Illinois
- Education: University of Cincinnati (BFA)
- Occupations: Stage, film, television actor
- Years active: 1980–present
- Awards: Bistro Awards (4); Ovation Awards (2); Joel Hirschhorn Award for Outstanding Achievement in Musical Theatre; Artistic Director's Achievement Award; New York Nightlife Awards (2)
- Website: http://www.jasongraae.com

Jason Graae (pronounced "grah" or "graw", but not "gray") (born 15 May 1958) is an American musical theater actor, best known for his musical theater performances but with a varied career spanning Broadway, opera, television and film. He has won four Bistro Awards, two Ovation Awards, two New York Nightlife Awards, the Theatre Bay Area Award for Best Actor in a Musical and the Los Angeles Drama Critics Circle Joel Hirschhorn Award for Outstanding Achievement in Musical Theatre.

== Early life ==
Though he was born in Chicago, Graae was educated in Tulsa, Oklahoma, at Edison Preparatory School where he played the oboe, acted in plays, and sang in the chorus. He appeared in a production of the musical George M! in the seventh grade. Graae was a member of the Tulsa Youth Symphony for four years in high school as the principal oboist. Following his passion for music, Graae went to Southern Methodist University in Dallas, hoping to become a concert oboist, but did not like his instructor's approach. He transferred to the Cincinnati Conservatory of Music only to have his previous instructor move there as well. Taking this as "a sign from the musical gods", he pursued a career in musical theatre instead. He graduated in 1980 with a Bachelor of Fine Arts in musical theatre from the now-merged University of Cincinnati – College-Conservatory of Music.

His mother was a dancer in Broadway musicals who moved to Europe after marrying his father; they fled from the Nazis in World War II and returned to the United States. His father was also musical, playing cello in a symphony outside Chicago in his spare time (while working as a scientist), and his sister is a classical pianist. Graae's first agent urged him to change his surname to "Grey" but he refused, wanting to honour his Danish father. He described Victor Borge, who came to America on the same boat as his father as both fled the 1940 invasion of Denmark, as his main inspiration. In 2007, his mother moved from Tulsa to Los Angeles to live with Graae and his partner. In an interview he said that "life has indeed upheaved as I know it.... We're thinking of starting a new sitcom called 'Two Gays, a Dog and an Old Lady.'" Graae came out to his mother in 1983, an experience recalled in his two-hander production The Prince and the Showboy with Faith Prince.

== Career ==
=== Early years ===
Graae made his off-Broadway debut in Godspell with Liz Callaway in 1980, forming a friendship which had them performing together in cabarets nearly 30 years later. He made his Broadway debut in Do Black Patent Leather Shoes Really Reflect Up?Jason created the role of Sparky in the musical Forever Plaid and was an original cast member alongside Stan Chandler, David Engel, and Guy Stroman, when it opened off-Broadway in 1989. It ran at Steve McGraw's for over four years with more than 1800 performances and, as his first hit show, helped him to become increasingly well known. The original four cast members shared a Bistro Award for Forever Plaid. Around the same time, he was nominated for the 1993 Drama Desk Award for Outstanding Actor in a Musical for Hello Muddah, Hello Fadduh. In 1997, Graae starred in the US premiere of Ragtime in the role of Houdini. Most recently, Jason traveled the U.S. for a year and 1/2 as the Wonderful Wizard of Oz in the National Tour of Wicked.

=== Overview ===
Graae's reputation has grown on Broadway with roles in the Rodgers and Hammerstein revue A Grand Night for Singing, Falsettos, Stardust, Snoopy!!!, and Do Black Patent Leather Shoes Really Reflect Up?. His voice work in advertising includes as the Lucky Charms leprechaun and representing Western Union Moneygrams, and he performed a singing voice in the film Home on the Range for Disney. He was the English voice for the protagonist Barry in the 2011 French animated film Sunshine Barry and the Disco Worms, co-starring Jane Lynch and David Bateson. His television roles include recurring appearances as Chad on the Showtime series Rude Awakening and as Dennis on HBO's Six Feet Under. He has guest starred in TV shows including Friends, Frasier, Sabrina the Teenage Witch, Caroline in the City, Living Single, and Providence, as well as in films including The Dukes of Hazzard: Hazzard in Hollywood! and Geppetto. Graae has released commercial audio recordings including You're Never Fully Dressed Without a Smile: Jason Graae Sings Charles Strouse, described as perfectly capturing "the mood and atmosphere of the cabaret experience – from the entertaining 'novelty' songs which he infuses with his own apt sense of humor, to the ballads interpreted beautifully." Graae was uncertain about the album's cover photo in which he appears "wearing nothing but a sly smile, a top hat (not on his head) and a cane" – and he "searched long and hard for the biggest hat [he] could find" – but ultimately agreed that it would be intriguing and is glad he did it.

=== The years 2000–2010 ===
In 2000, Graae was cast in Forbidden Broadway Y2K LA!, an updated version of the Forbidden Broadway franchise of revues which parody musical theatre. The franchise had earlier spawned a spinoff a similar parody of the world of Hollywood in which Graae had appeared. He earned a nomination for an Ovation Award for Forbidden Hollywood and won an Ovation Award for Forbidden Broadway Y2K LA! He is included on the Forbidden Broadway: 20th Anniversary Edition cast album, the sixth in the series. He received an Ovation Award nomination for Anything Goes in 2003 and around the same time was developing his one-man show, Coup de Graae!. He has performed this show in numerous cities including New York, San Francisco, and Hollywood. It was amongst Time Out New York's top 10 cabaret acts of 2006. Coup de Graae! includes songs and stories from Graae's life (featuring Rodgers and Hart, Jerry Herman, and the Bergmans), and references to his voice-over work; he is described as "the complete entertainer, giddy, irreverent, mischievous and moving, often at the same time." The Los Angeles Times described the show as "an eclectic banquet of standards, show tunes, pop songs, incisive wit, easygoing charm and a humorous dessert featuring his tale as the voice of 'Lucky the Leprechaun'." The show won a New York Nightlife Award for Graae. He has developed other eponymous shows, including Graae's Anatomy (2007) and 49 1/2 Shades of Graae (2014).

In 2004, Graae took on the one-man play Fully Committed, which required him to perform 30 different roles in 80 minutes. Praised for a hilarious performance in which he plays "low-key charm as well as pile-driving obnoxiousness with equal skill," he earned an Artistic Director's Achievement Award for his performance. In 2005, he won the third of his four Bistro Awards, this one for Best Major Engagement for Coup de Graae!

The Joel Hirschhorn Award is given annually by the Los Angeles Drama Critics Circle for "outstanding achievement in musical theatre"; Graae was honoured with this award in 2007. In 2008, he starred opposite Constance Towers in the Los Angeles revival of Arthur Allan Seidelman's production of Six Dance Lessons in Six Weeks; the play had premiered at the Geffen Playhouse in 2001 with Uta Hagen and David Hyde Pierce in the two roles. Hyde Pierce and Graae worked together as long-lost identical twin brothers in a 1999 production of The Boys from Syracuse.

=== The years 2011 to the present ===
In 2012, he worked with long-term friend Faith Prince on The Prince and the Showboy presented at the 54 Below nightclub. The show includes tributes to Jerry Herman, composer of the musicals La Cage aux Folles and Hello Dolly!; Graae described Herman as "a survivor of the highest degree [who] lives his life as an eternal optimist." The Herman material coalesces around Graae's recollections about coming out to his mother. Prince and Graae won the New York Nightlife Award for outstanding musical comedy performer in January 2013.

Graae performed in Little Me in its original form with 42nd Street Moon in San Francisco in 2013, under the direction of Eric Inman. He received critical acclaim, being described as "stepping into the roles previously inhabited by two of the most versatile entertainers in Broadway and Hollywood history" and as having "boundless energy and a staggering level of comedic talent" as well as a "quick wit (he's a master at ad libbing onstage) [which] came in handy when a fake moustache started to take on a life of its own" on opening night. While collaborating with 42nd Street Moon, he performed in Once In Love With Loesser, developed by the company's artistic director Greg MacKellan as one of his musical tributes dedicated to exploring and celebrating the work of some of Broadway's greatest songwriters. The performance was built around the three stages of Frank Loesser's career: as a Tin Pan Alley lyricist, his work in Hollywood, and finally as a Broadway songwriter. Graae performed Once In Love With Amy (from Where's Charley?) and The King's New Clothes (from the 1952 Danny Kaye film Hans Christian Andersen) and was described as having "scored strongly".

In 2015–16, Graae took on the iconic role of Ebeneezer Scrooge in the premiere of a new musical, Scrooge in Love! written by Duane Poole, (music by Larry Grossman and lyrics by Kellan Blair), at San Francisco's Eureka Theatre. In a twist on the Dickens classic, rather than being miserly, this Scrooge sees money as a cure-all and takes generosity overboard. His performance was praised as providing an "often puckish Scrooge who alternates between knowing how to sell a punch line and humanizing the old man's neuroses." For his performance as Scrooge, Jason won the 2016 Theatre Bay Area Award as Best Actor in a Musical and the San Francisco Bay Area Theatre Critics Circle nominated Graae for an Excellence in Theatre Award in the category of best principal actor in a musical .

Graae gave a series of well-received performances in a concert version of the musical The Pajama Game at the Musical Theatre Guild in Los Angeles in 2016. In October 2016, he performed in a concert version of Stephen Sondheim and George Furth's Merrily We Roll Along, winner of the Drama Desk Award and Olivier Award for Best Musical. In March 2017 he is scheduled to appear with Liz Callaway in Happily Ever Laughter billed as an evening of "love songs, high belting, and hilarity" at Annenberg Theater in the Palm Springs Art Museum in Palm Springs CA.

=== Opera ===
Graae made his operatic debut with the Metropolitan Opera in Twyla Tharp's Everlast in conjunction with the American Ballet Theatre. He has also sung with the Washington National Opera and the Boston Pops. His Los Angeles Opera debut was in 2001 in the role of Njegus in The Merry Widow. Performing with the Michigan Opera Theatre in the same role earned him a nomination for an Oscar Wilde Award in the category of Best Performance – Opera. He has played the roles of Offenbach in The Grand Duchess with the Los Angeles Opera, and Frosch in Die Fledermaus with the San Francisco Opera, Washington National Opera, Houston Grand Opera and the Manhattan School of Music.

== Personal life ==
Graae married his partner, fashion designer Glen Fretwell in 2014.

== Awards and nominations ==
Year	Nonminated Work	Award	Result	Notes
1989	Forever Plaid	Bistro Award	Won	Cast award
1993	Hello Muddah, Hello Fadduh	Drama Desk Award for Outstanding Actor in a Musical	Nominated	
1995	Forbidden Hollywood	Ovation Award	Nominated	
2000	Forbidden Broadway Y2K LA!	Ovation Award	Won	
2001	Best Musical Comedy performance	Bistro Award	Won	
2003	Anything Goes	Ovation Award	Nominated	
2004	Fully Committed	Artistic Director's Achievement Award	Won	
2006	Coup de Graae!	Bistro Award for Best Major Engagement	Won	
2006	Coup de Graae!	New York Nightlife Award	Won	
2007		L.A Drama Critics Circle Award for Outstanding Achievement in Musical Theatre	Won	
2008	Coup de Graae	Bistro Award	Won	
2012	The Prince and the Showboy	New York Nightlife Award for Outstanding Musical Comedy Duo	Won	with Faith Prince
2015	Scrooge in Love!	San Francisco Theatre Bay Area Award for Best Actor in a Musical	Won	
2016	The Merry Widow	Oscar Wilde Award	Nominated	
