= Forbidden Hollywood =

Forbidden Hollywood can refer to:

- Forbidden Hollywood (parody), a parody show that opened Off-Off-Broadway
- Forbidden Hollywood, a Warner Archive Collection DVD series which included inter alia the following pre-Code films:
  - Ex-Lady, 1933
  - Dark Hazard, 1934
  - The Mouthpiece, 1932
  - The Purchase Price, 1932
  - Three Kathryn Scola films: Baby Face, Female and Midnight Mary
  - Big Business Girl, 1931
  - The Divorcee, 1930
  - Blonde Crazy, 1931
  - A Free Soul, 1931
  - Waterloo Bridge, 1931
- Forbidden Hollywood, a successor band to Frankie Goes to Hollywood
