= Forbidden Broadway Goes to Rehab =

- Poster
- Music: Various
- Lyrics: Gerard Alessandrini
- Book: Gerard Alessandrini
- Basis: Broadway musicals
- Productions: 2008 Off Broadway

Forbidden Broadway Goes to Rehab is the 2008 incarnation of Gerard Alessandrini's long-running hit Off-Broadway musical revue Forbidden Broadway, which parodies notable current Broadway and Off-Broadway musicals. It was initially announced that this would be the final version of the show, until the franchise was revived with Forbidden Broadway: Alive & Kicking! in 2012 and Forbidden Broadway Comes Out Swinging! in 2014.

== Production ==
Forbidden Broadway Goes to Rehab opened on September 17, 2008 at New York's 47th Street Theatre and closed on March 1, 2009. The show was conceived, created and written by Alessandrini and was co-directed by Alessandrini and Phillip George.

The plays and musicals parodied in Forbidden Broadway Goes to Rehab include August: Osage County, Equus, Spring Awakening, In the Heights, A Tale of Two Cities, South Pacific, Mary Poppins, Gypsy, Sunday In The Park With George, Young Frankenstein, and Xanadu. The personalities portrayed include Bernadette Peters, Patti LuPone, Liza Minnelli and Kristin Chenoweth.

== Opening cast ==
- Christina Bianco
- Jared Bradshaw
- Gina Kreiezmar
- Michael West
- David Caldwell, music director and piano

== Replacements and understudies ==
- James Donegan replaced Jared Bradshaw
- Kristen Mengelkoch, female understudy
- William Selby, male understudy/dance captain

== Original cast album ==
The tracks featured on the cast recording

1. Forbidden Broadway Goes to Rehab
2. All That Chat
3. In the Heights Segment
4. Tale of Two Cities Segment
5. South Pacific Segment
6. Mary Poppins: 2nd Season
7. August: Osage County
8. Daniel Radcliffe in Equus
9. Patti Lupone [sic] In Gypsy
10. Young Frankenstein
11. Xanadude
12. Kristen [sic] Chenoweth: Glitter and Be Glib
13. Sondheim: Putting Up Revivals
14. Stephen Sondheim Finale
15. My Musical Comedy Smile
16. The Pajama Game
17. See Me on a Monday
18. (Dying Is Easy) Comedy Is Hard

== See also ==
- Forbidden Broadway
- Forbidden Broadway, Vol. 1
- Forbidden Broadway, Vol. 2
- Forbidden Broadway, Vol. 3
- Forbidden Hollywood
- Forbidden Broadway Strikes Back
- Forbidden Broadway Cleans Up Its Act
- Forbidden Broadway: 20th Anniversary Edition
- Forbidden Broadway 2001: A Spoof Odyssey
- Forbidden Broadway: Special Victims Unit
- Forbidden Broadway: Rude Awakening
