= Tom Plotkin =

American actor

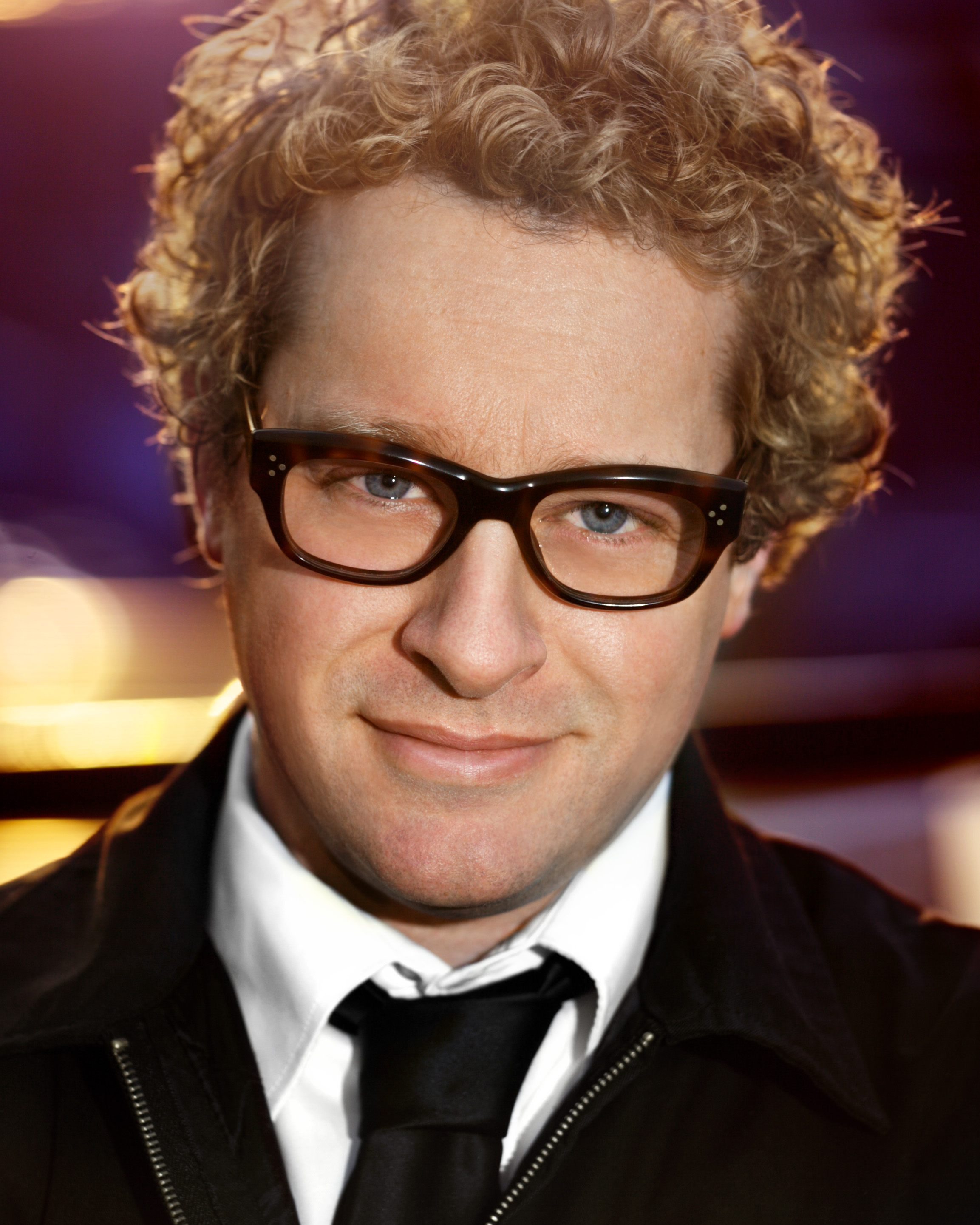
- Tom Plotkin in 2011
- Occupation: Actor

Tom Plotkin is an American actor. He is primarily a Broadway performer and is most famous for originating the role of Willard Hewitt in Footloose. He was also in the original Broadway companies of Seussical, High Fidelity, Triumph of Love, and in the City Center "Encores" production of Hair in the role of Berger. He was also in the International tour of Hair playing Berger in the languages of French, German, and English.

Off Broadway he was in Forbidden Broadway and can be heard on the "unoriginal" cast recording, Forbidden Broadway Strikes Back
