= Forbidden Broadway Cleans Up Its Act =

Forbidden Broadway Cleans Up Its Act is the fifth incarnation of Gerard Alessandrini's Forbidden Broadway, his popular off-Broadway musical revue spoofing "the best of Broadway". The parody lyrics were written by Gerard Alessandrini. This version was co-directed by Alessandrini and his long-time collaborator Phillip George. George had up till then only been credited with "Musical Staging" and as "Assistant Director". George also contributed many of the more successful ideas and dialogue sketches to the more recent Forbidden Broadway editions. The show played in the basement of Ellen's Stardust Diner (also known as the Stardust Theatre), and the album is the fifth volume in the series. It was recorded 17 and 18 December 1998 for release in March 1999.

The leading premise of the show and album is that, like Times Square, Forbidden Broadway should drop its raunchy demeanor and "clean up" its parodies. Naturally, the cast fails spectacularly, meanwhile spoofing new shows like Chicago, The Lion King, Ragtime, Titanic, Jekyll and Hyde, and Footloose. They also take stabs at personalities like Rudolph Giuliani, Ann Miller, Julie Taymor, Bebe Neuwirth, and Leonardo DiCaprio.

== Cast ==
Cast members featured on the album who also appeared in the show when it first opened:

- Bryan Batt
- Lori Hammel
- Edward Staudenmayer
- Kristine Zbornik

== Tracks ==
The musical numbers, with title, original song, and original composers listed, that are featured on the album:

1. "A Jolly Holiday With Rudy" ("Jolly Holiday")
2. "Forbidden Broadway Cleans Up Its Act!" ("Another Op'nin', Another Show"),
3. "Chicago - Glosse Fosse" ("Razzle Dazzle")
4. "Footloose - Too Cute" ("Footloose")
5. "The Beauty Queen of Leenane" ("How Are Things in Glocca Morra?")
6. "The Lion King Segment": The Circle Of Mice ("Circle of Life"), Julie Taymor And Her Puppets ("The Lonely Goatherd"), Can You Feel The Pain Tonight? ("Can You Feel the Love Tonight")
7. "Andrew Lloyd Webber Superstar" ("Jesus Christ Superstar" and "Memory")
8. "Titanic - The Musical": In Every Season ("In Every Age"), Ship Of Air ("There She Is"), The Reviews Are Broadcast ("The Night Is Alive"), Bottom ("Autumn"), There's A Movie Going On ("My Heart Will Go On")
9. "More Miserable - Ten Years More" ("One Day More")
10. "Bernadette Peters In Annie Get Your Gun" ("There's No Business Like Show Business")
11. "Swan Lake" (various themes from the ballet)
12. "Ann Miller - I'm Still Weird" ("I'm Still Here")
13. "Jekyll And Hyde": ("Murder-Murder", "No One Knows Who I Am", "This Is My Key Change")
14. "Ragtime Segment"
15. "Super-Frantic-Hyper-Active-Self-Indulgent-Mandy" (Mandy Patinkin in Mamoloshen - "Hava Nagila", "Dreidel" and "Supercalifragilisticexpialidocious")
16. "Cabaret Segment" ("Wilkommen" and "Cabaret")
17. "The Sound Of Music In Cabaret"
18. "Finale - Find Mary Martin" ("Climb Ev'ry Mountain")
19. "Forbidden Broadway Cleans Up Its Act! - Encore"
20. "Bonus Track - Epilogue" ("New Music")

== See also ==
- Forbidden Broadway
- Forbidden Broadway, Vol. 1
- Forbidden Broadway, Vol. 2
- Forbidden Broadway, Vol. 3
- Forbidden Hollywood
- Forbidden Broadway Strikes Back
- Forbidden Broadway: 20th Anniversary Edition
- Forbidden Broadway 2001: A Spoof Odyssey
- Forbidden Broadway: Special Victims Unit
- Forbidden Broadway: Rude Awakening
- Forbidden Broadway Goes to Rehab
