= Bryan Batt =

American actor (born 1963)

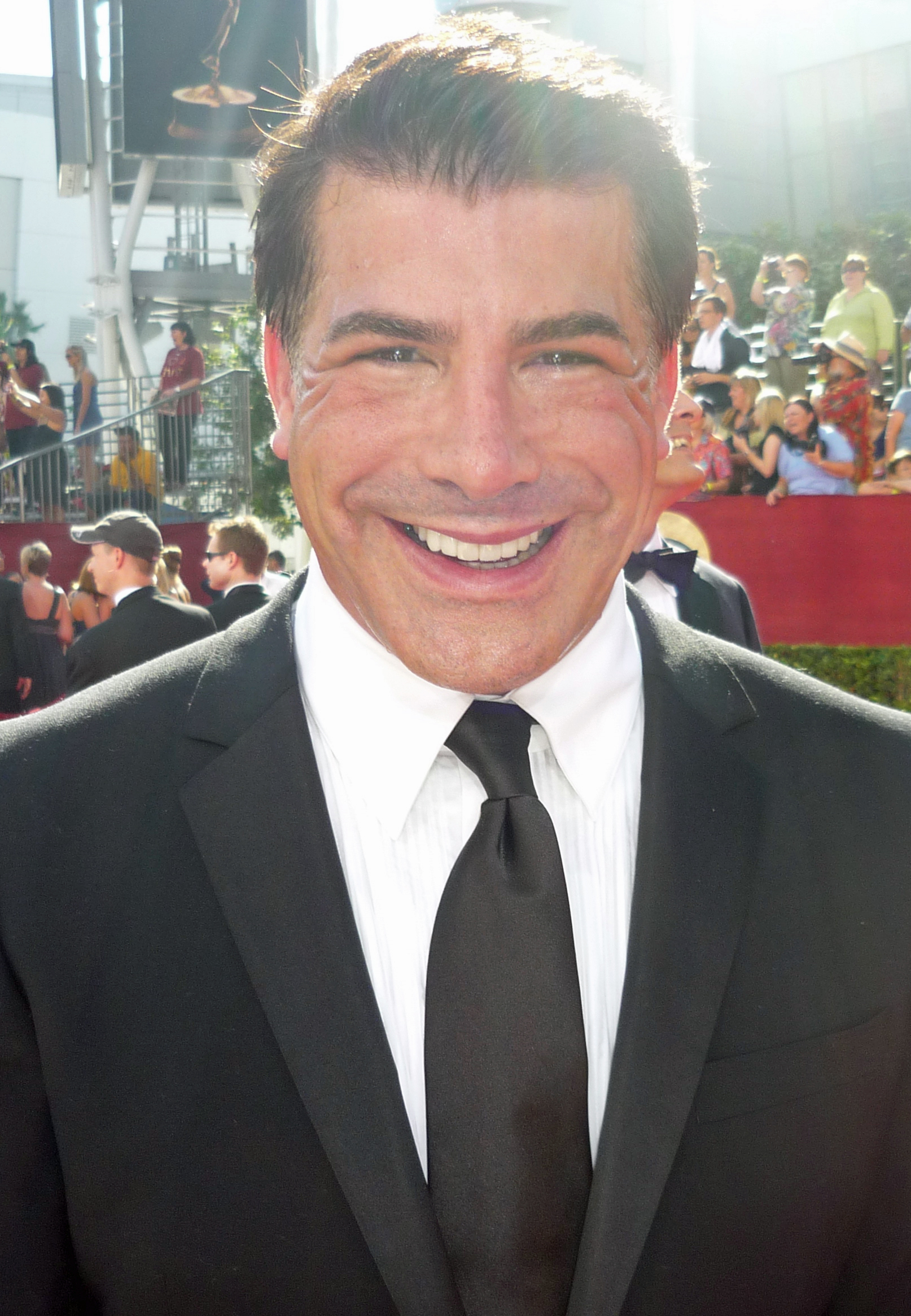
- Batt in September 2009
- Born: March 1, 1963 (age 63); New Orleans, Louisiana, U.S.
- Education: Tulane University
- Occupations: Actor, author
- Years active: 1988–present
- Spouse: Tom Cianfichi (m. 2014)
- Relatives: Jay Batt (brother)

Bryan Batt (born March 1, 1963) is an American actor best known for his role in the AMC series Mad Men as Salvatore Romano, the closeted art director for the Sterling Cooper agency. Primarily a theater actor, he has had a number of starring roles in movies and television as well. His performance in the musical adaptation of Saturday Night Fever earned him one of New York City's more unusual honors, a caricature at Sardi's.

== Early life ==
Batt was born in New Orleans, Louisiana, the son of Gayle (née Mackenroth), an amateur actress, dancer, and civic activist, and John Batt. His family founded and ran the Pontchartrain Beach amusement park. He attended and graduated from Isidore Newman School (a preparatory school in New Orleans) and Tulane University, where he was a member of Delta Kappa Epsilon fraternity.

== Personal life ==
In 2010, Batt published a memoir about his mother entitled She Ain't Heavy, She's My Mother. She died in December 2010. In 2011, he published a second book, Big, Easy, Style, which focuses on interior design and home furnishings. On September 28, 2014, Batt married his long-time partner Tom Cianfichi, an event planner. Batt and Cianfichi own a home decor and furnishings store, Hazelnut, on Magazine Street in New Orleans.

== Filmography ==
=== Film ===
Year	Title	Role	Notes
1995	Jeffrey	Darius	
1997	Kiss Me, Guido	Tino	
1999	Hit and Runway	Carlos	
2009	Funny People	George's Agent	
2011	Brawler	Fat Chucky	
2011	Nine Lives: A Musical Adaption Live	Billy Grace	
2013	B-Side	Andrews	
2013	Wiener Dog Nationals	Judge Brown	
2013	12 Years a Slave	Judge Turner	
2013	Parkland	Malcolm Kilduff	
2013	The Last of Robin Hood	Orry-Kelly	
2015	Zipper	Bob Fisher	
2015	Sam	Alexander Blondell	
2015	The Runner	Mark Lavin	
2016	The Book of Love	Dr. Melvin	
2016	A Boy Called Po	Randall Bane	
2016	Abattoir	Chester	
2016	LBJ	Jim Rowe	
2017	Mississippi Murder	Bernard	
2017	Wiener Dog Internationals	Judge Brown	
2018	Tales from the Hood 2	John Lloyd	Video
2018	Billionaire Boys Club	Ludo	
2019	I Hate Kids	Rev. McGooley	
2019	Darlin'	The Bishop	
2019	Easy Does It	Officer Owens	
2020	Don't Look Back	Rev. Farmer	Also known as Good Samaritan
2020	American Reject	Buddy Bisk	
2021	Night Teeth	Gio	
2022	Pinball: The Man Who Saved the Game	Harry Coulianos	
2023	I'll Be Watching	Dr. Tate	
2024	High Tide	Todd	
2026	Loves Company	Jimmy	
2026	A Statement		

=== Television ===
Year	Title	Role	Notes
1997	As the World Turns	Teddy	Episode: "1.10423"
2003, 2011	Law & Order: Criminal Intent	Hugo, Hutton Mays	Episodes: "Suite Sorrow", "Trophy Wine"
2007–2009	Mad Men	Salvatore Romano	Regular role (seasons 1–3)
2009	Ghost Whisperer	Maitre D'	Episode: "Do Over"
2010	Ugly Betty	Spencer Cannon	Episodes: "The Past Presents the Future", "Hello Goodbye"
2015–2016	Scream	Mayor Quinn Maddox	Recurring role (seasons 1–2)
2016	NCIS	Dalton Greenbrick	Episode: "Sister City: Part I"
2016	NCIS: New Orleans	Dalton Greenbrick	Episode: "Sister City: Part II"
2018	The Marvelous Mrs. Maisel	Dr. Stone	Episode: "Night at the Concord"
2019	The Simpsons	Philip Hefflin / Carl (voice)	Episode: "Mad About the Toy"
2019	Tales of the City	Chris Bauer	Episode: "The Price of Oil"
2019	EastSiders	Richard	Episodes: "Both Sides Now", "Always Upwards"
2020	The Blacklist	Antony Eagleton	Episode: "Victoria Fenberg"
2021	The Premise	Charles	Episode: "Butt Plug"

== Theater ==
Broadway

Year	Title	Role	Venue
1987	Starlight Express	Rocky I/Greaseball	Gershwin Theatre
1992	Cats	Munkustrap	Winter Garden Theatre
1993	Joseph and the Amazing Technicolor Dreamcoat	Reuben/Pharaoh	Minskoff Theatre
1994	Sunset Boulevard	u/s Joe Gillis/Ensemble	Minskoff Theatre
1994	Beauty and the Beast	Lumière	Lunt-Fontanne Theatre
1997	The Scarlet Pimpernel	standby Percy/Pimpernel	Minskoff Theatre
1999	Saturday Night Fever	Monty	Minskoff Theatre
2000	Seussical	Alternate Cat in the Hat	Richard Rodgers Theatre
2004	La Cage aux Folles	standby Albin	Marquis Theatre

Off-Broadway

Year	Title	Role	Venue
1986	Too Many Girls	Al	Equity Library Theatre
1990	Grease	Kenicke	Darien Dinner Theater
1990	The Golden Apple	Patroclus	York Theater
1991	Give My Regards to Broadway	Choir	Carnegie Hall
1993	Jeffrey	Darius/Man in bed	WPA Theatre and Minetta Lane Theatre
1996–98	Forbidden Broadway Strikes Back	Various	Triad Theater
1998–98	Forbidden Broadway Cleans Up Its Act	Performer	Stardust Theatre
1998	I Love New York	Performer	Rainbow and Stars
1998	Ascendancy	Performer	Rattlestick Theatre
1998	In the Beginning	Performer	Maine State Theatre
2022	To My Girls	Bernie	Tony Kiser Theater
2023	Pay the Writer	Bruston Fischer	Pershing Square Signature Center, Alice Griffin Jewel Box Theatre

Regional

- Evita – Che (Carousel Dinner Theater)
- Grease – Kenicke (Darien Dinner Theater)
- Trixie True, Teen Detective – Dick Dickerson (Boston Post Road Stage Co.)
- Romeo and Juliet – Paris (New Orleans Center Stage)
- The Lover – John (New Orleans Center Stage)
- Action – Jeep (New Orleans Center Stage)

== Awards and nominations ==
Year	Award	Category	Nominated work	Result
1999	Drama Desk Awards	Best Featured Actor in a Musical	Forbidden Broadway Cleans; Up Its Act	Nominated
2007	Screen Actors Guild Awards	Outstanding Ensemble in a Drama Series	Mad Men	Nominated
2008	Screen Actors Guild Awards	Outstanding Ensemble in a Drama Series	Mad Men	Won
2009	Screen Actors Guild Awards	Outstanding Ensemble in a Drama Series	Mad Men	Won

== Bibliography ==
- She Ain't Heavy, She's My Mother: A Memoir (Random House, 2010), ISBN 978-0-307-58885-2
- Big, Easy Style (Clarkson Potter Publishers, 2011), ISBN 978-0-307-59190-6
