= Trixie True, Teen Detective =

Trixie True, Teen Detective is an Off-Broadway musical with book, music and lyrics by American playwright and composer Kelly Hamilton. It was the first musical to employ the post-modern comedic style then being explored on television by such shows as Saturday Night Live and SCTV. Set in New York City in 1944, the musical centers on hack writer Joe Sneed, who is employed to write a series of books similar to the Nancy Drew mysteries. Under the watchful eye of his iron willed boss Miss Snood, Joe cranks out "The Secret of the Tapping Shoes," which comes to life on stage. The show within the show features teenage sleuth Trixie True and her chums, who sing and dance their way through soda shops, tap studios, a Big Broadcast, and a mystery involving German spies, World War II and a submerged submarine.

The musical opened on December 4, 1980, at The Lucille Lortel Theater, then known as The Theater De Lys, in New York City. Producers of the show were Doug Cole, Joe Novak, Joseph Butt and Spencer Tandy. It was directed by Bill Gile, musical staging and choreography by Arthur Faria, and designed by Michael J. Hotopp and Paul De Passe. Costumes were by David Toser and orchestrations by Eddie Sauter. The recording was produced by Neal Newman.

== Cast ==
The opening night cast for Trixie True, Teen Detective featured Marilyn Sokol in the role of Miss Snood, who also doubles in the role of leggy, smoldering Madame Olga, a sexy spy. Gene Lindsey played hack writer Joe Sneed, and Jay Loman portrayed his sidekick Al. Kathy Andrini was pretty, perky and permanently 18 Trixie True, and Keith Rice played opposite her as boyfriend and captain of the football team, Dick Dickerson. Trixie's chums Maxine and Laverne were played by Alison Bevan and Marianna Allen, and Keith Caldwell played their chum Bobby.

== Reception ==
Jay Sharbett of the Associated Press called it "a fine night of sly craziness," Stewart Klein of WNBC judged it to be "giddy fun," and Rex Reed in The New York Post declared it "clever, novel and nifty." In the New York Times, however, Frank Rich praised the inventive sets, especially the underwater submarine, but quipped that the show itself was "all wet," and Douglas Watt from the New York Daily News complained not only that the show had "no more depth than an animated cartoon," but also that "there were too many close-cropped young men in the audience," an apparent reference to the musical's enthusiastic gay following. Clive Barnes in the New York Post and Edith Oliver in The New Yorker both dismissed the show as "camp," but Page Six in the New York Post reported that "Trixie True, Teen Detective had audiences cheering, applauding and stomping their feet," Variety announced that "Trixie True delivers," Dance Magazine hailed it as "a snazzy new musical" and CNN dubbed it "a bright new hit that lights up the season."
