= Brad Ellis =

American jazz musician

Brad Ellis is an American composer, musical director, singer, orchestrator, and jazz pianist. Ellis is perhaps most visible as Brad the mostly quiet pianist for the high school kids on Glee, the Fox television show for which he is part of creator Ryan Murphy's musical production team.

== Biography ==
Ellis grew up in the Boston area, attending Lexington High School. One of his teachers introduced him to the music program at Boston's Berklee College of Music, where Ellis studied music composition starting in the late 1970s, earning his degree between gigs over the next fifteen years.

Ellis had a long association with the continuously evolving Off-Broadway satirical revue Forbidden Broadway where he met his wife, comedienne Eydie Alyson.

His Brad Ellis Little Big Band has released recordings, produced by Bruce Kimmel.

Ellis arranged, orchestrated and conducted members of the Los Angeles Philharmonic for their 2006 album Unexpected Dreams: Songs from the Stars, in helping support the Philharmonic's "Music Matters" fund for music education. The album featured performances by TV and film stars including Victor Garber, Lucy Lawless, and Scarlett Johansson.

In 2006 Ellis orchestrated and arranged the world premiere of Billy Joel's "Waltz Variations no.2 op.5", performed by Christoph Eschenbach and the Philadelphia Orchestra, for the 151st Anniversary Gala celebration of Philadelphia's Academy of Music.

He created, with Jason Alexander, Seven Broadway Shows in 7 Minutes. This witty medley was performed by Alexander with the Hollywood Bowl Orchestra, when the orchestra inducted its long-time conductor John Mauceri into the Hollywood Bowl Hall of Fame in 2007.

Ellis is the composer of the original music for the 2009 Off Broadway run of The Tin Pan Alley Rag, which told the story of a fictional meeting between musical greats Scott Joplin and Irving Berlin.

Ellis has composed or played piano for many TV shows and films, including Gilmore Girls (in the Season 5 episode "Jews and Chinese Food", the Season 7 episode "Unto the Breach", and original ragtime cues in the last episode of the last season), Close to Home, De-Lovely, Bunheads, and the DVD special features for Beauty and the Beast.

In 2009, Ellis joined the production team which created the new television series Glee. Ellis joined the team as a musical director and vocal coach, but received additional duties as an on-screen, virtually non-speaking character providing piano accompaniment to the glee club. From the pilot episode, Ellis' name appears in the technical credits rather than the character credits of his on-screen episodes. The enigmatic role has led to Ellis being featured in interviews with People magazine, CNN.com, National Public Radio and Entertainment Weekly.

In 2009, Ellis was part of the team that created the music and lyrics for the opening number for 81st Academy Awards telecast, performed by Oscar host Hugh Jackman. The four main creators won the 2009 Emmy Award for Original Music and Lyrics for their work, while Ellis was bestowed a certificate of honor by the Emmy award's Academy of Television Arts and Sciences, in June 2010, for his contributions of original music and lyrics to the number.

In 2011, Ellis worked with Robert Ulrich, casting director for Glee, on the first special episode of The Glee Project, coaching 80 potential candidates for the show. He was featured in the music segment of the special one-hour "Audition Process" episode that teased in the pilot of The Glee Project. To the surprise of many Glee fans, he spoke on the show.

In July, 2013, Ellis was pianist for Glee star Matthew Morrison's run at the 54 Below nightclub in Manhattan. The show opened the same night that Glee co-star Cory Monteith died, so the two opened each subsequent show with the song "What I Did for Love", from A Chorus Line, as a tribute to Monteith. Ellis continues to be the music director, orchestrator and arranger for Matthew Morrison as he tours, performing with major symphony orchestras, and in cabaret venues throughout the world. He also serves as music director/orchestrator for Jane Lynch, when she performs her symphonic concerts as those appearances with the Pittsburgh Symphony and Boston Pops.

Ellis worked as a music director for The Rocky Horror Picture Show: Let's Do the Time Warp Again (2016) on FOX TV directed by Kenny Ortega. In 2016, he was honored to be invited back by Amy Sherman Pallidino and Dan Sherman to reprise his role as Brad, the piano player, on Gilmore Girls: A Year in the Life in the segment "Fall" featuring Sutton Foster, Christian Borle and Carole King.

Ellis received a heart transplant in 1999, after suffering from heart failure due to a virus as a child. On June 22, 2011, he was honored by Donate Life Hollywood as their "Person of the Year" for his work promoting organ transplant awareness.
