= Craig Wells =

Australian rugby union player (born 1970)

- Full name: Craig Allan Wells
- Born: 16 July 1970 (age 56)

Rugby union career
- Position: Centre
Provincial / State sides
Years	Team	Apps	(Points)
1999	Southland	10	(5)
Super Rugby
Years	Team	Apps	(Points)
1999	Brumbies	2	(0)

Craig Allan Wells (born 16 July 1970) is an Australian former professional rugby union player.

== Rugby career ==
A centre, Wells was an Emerging Wallabies player and made the extended Wallabies squad for the 1991 Rugby World Cup, before the list got trimmed. He was recruited by the ACT Brumbies on the back of a strong 1998 Shute Shield season with Northern Suburbs, which he had helped to a rare grand final appearance. In 1999, Wells featured twice for the Brumbies during their Super 12 campaign and finished the year with a stint at New Zealand provincial team Southland. His professional career was limited by recurring injuries.

== Criminal conviction ==
Wells received a six-year prison sentence in 2017 for the aggravated rape of a 14-year-old girl.

== See also ==
- List of ACT Brumbies players
