= Forbidden Broadway =

Revue Gerard Alessandrini parodying musicals

- Logo
- Music: Various
- Lyrics: Gerard Alessandrini
- Book: Gerard Alessandrini
- Basis: Broadway musicals
- Productions: 1982 off-Broadway

Forbidden Broadway is an off-Broadway revue parodying musical theatre, particularly Broadway musicals. Conceived, written, and directed by Gerard Alessandrini, the show has been updated many times to parody new musicals and productions. The revue is typically performed by a cast of four with a piano. Versions of the show have been staged in more than 200 U.S. cities, as well as London, Tokyo and elsewhere around the world.

== Background ==
The original version of Forbidden Broadway opened on January 15, 1982, at Palsson's Supper Club in New York City and ran there for 2,332 performances. Alessandrini has updated and rewritten the revue more than two dozen times over the years to include parodies of newer shows. In the original iteration at Palsson's, Alessandrini performed alongside Nora Mae Lyng, for whom Alessandrini has said he created the show. Michael Chapman was briefly the director of Forbidden Broadway, but later in 1982, Jeff Martin became director. In 1983 Alessandrini left the cast and assumed the directing position, with Phillip George often co-directing or directing various editions through 2016. Since then, Alessandrini has written, created and directed all subsequent editions.

Through the decades, there have been thousands of performances of Forbidden Broadway in New York City, and the show has been seen in more than 200 U.S. cities as well as playing in London, Tokyo, Singapore and Sydney.

== Description ==
The show is a cabaret revue sharply spoofing show tunes, characters and plots of contemporary and current Broadway musicals. Forbidden Broadway and its many sequels have mocked popular shows like The Phantom of the Opera, Wicked, Les Misérables, The Lion King, Spamalot, Annie, Spider-Man: Turn Off the Dark, Rent, and Newsies. The revue also targets famous Broadway actors, writers, composers, directors, choreographers and producers, including Julie Andrews, Mel Brooks, Carol Channing, Kristin Chenoweth, Michael Crawford, Harvey Fierstein, Bob Fosse, Whoopi Goldberg, Robert Goulet, Jerry Herman, Dustin Hoffman, Elton John, Angela Lansbury, Andrew Lloyd Webber, Patti LuPone, Cameron Mackintosh, Mary Martin, Ethel Merman, Liza Minnelli, Rita Moreno, Mandy Patinkin, Bernadette Peters, Chita Rivera, Stephen Sondheim, Barbra Streisand, Julie Taymor, and Gwen Verdon.

Forbidden Broadway is performed as a four or five-person show, with two men, two women (and in at least one production, a teen), with piano accompaniment. Forbidden Broadway has released more than a dozen albums, as well as Forbidden Hollywood, spoofing cinematic topics. The New York and Los Angeles-based companies of both Forbidden incarnations have served as a workshop for rising talent to hone their skills. Alumni include Jason Alexander, Brad Oscar, Christine Pedi, Bryan Batt, Michael McGrath, Chloe Webb, Barbara Walsh, Ann Morrison, and many more.

In 2006, the show and Alessandrini were awarded Tony Honors for Excellence in Theatre. It has been nominated eight times for the Drama Desk Award for Outstanding Revue, winning four times (2001, 2005, 2008 and 2025). It also won Drama Desk Special Awards in 1985 and 2009. In 2009 a book of "Best of" lyrics and the show's history was published under the title Forbidden Broadway: Behind the Mylar Curtain.

A 2009 review of the London production, in Britain's The Independent, commented: "Actors have always poked fun at the foibles of commercial theatre. ... Usually, though, they keep their parodies to themselves. It takes a touch of genius to turn them into something saleable, but writer [Gerard] Alessandrini has that Midas touch." The original artwork advertising the show was designed by caricaturist Ken Fallin, who suggested the actors find the name "Nina" written on their bodies as an homage to Al Hirschfeld, who was known for working his daughter's name into his drawings.

A 2012/13 version of the show, Forbidden Broadway: Alive and Kicking!, played in New York and was revived in 2014. Another off-Broadway version, Forbidden Broadway Comes Out Swinging, played in 2014 at the Davenport Theatre. A London edition in 2014 began at the Menier Chocolate Factory and transferred to the Vaudeville Theatre, starring Christina Bianco, Anna-Jane Casey, Damian Humbley and Ben Lewis, with Phillip George directing. In 2019, Forbidden Broadway Salutes Carol Channing played a celebration show for the late Carol Channing in New York.

Forbidden Broadway: The Next Generation opened on October 16, 2019, at New York's The Triad Theatre and later moved to The York Theatre in January 2020. Again, the show was created, written and directed by Alessandrini. The plays and musicals parodied in this version included Dear Evan Hansen, Moulin Rouge!, Tootsie, The Ferryman, Hadestown, Fiddler on the Roof, Harry Potter and the Cursed Child, Oklahoma, Mary Poppins, The Prom, and Fosse/Verdon. The personalities portrayed included Lin-Manuel Miranda, Judy Garland, Billy Porter and Harold Prince.

In 2023, a new edition of the show titled Forbidden Sondheim: Merrily We Stole a Song premiered at Don't Tell Mama in New York City and later played at The Green Fig cabaret. It included many of the parodies of Stephen Sondheim musicals that had been featured in the show over its more than 40-year history. In 2024, a version titled Forbidden Broadway: Merrily We Stole a Song was announced to play on Broadway, which would have been the series' Broadway debut. Instead, it opened off-Broadway at Theater 555, on September 19, written and directed by Alessandrini, with musical staging by Gerry McIntyre and set design by Glenn Bassett. As of 2025 Forbidden Broadway: Merrily We Stole a Song is touring the United States.

== Editions of Forbidden Broadway ==
- Forbidden Broadway (1982)
- Forbidden Broadway 1984
- Forbidden Broadway 1985
- Forbidden Broadway 1986: Summer Shock!
- Forbidden Broadway 1988
- Forbidden Broadway 1990
- Forbidden Broadway 1991½
- Forbidden Broadway 1992: Tenth Anniversary
- Forbidden Broadway 1992 Featuring Forbidden Christmas
- Forbidden Broadway 1993: Take No Prisoners
- Forbidden Broadway 1994
- Forbidden Hollywood" 1995
- Forbidden Broadway Strikes Back (October 17, 1996 – September 20, 1998) (won Drama Desk Award for Outstanding Lyrics; nominated for the Drama Desk Award for Outstanding Revue)
- Forbidden Broadway Cleans Up Its Act (November 17, 1998 – August 30, 2000) (nominated for Drama Desk Award for Outstanding Revue)
- Forbidden Broadway 2001: A Spoof Odyssey (December 6, 2000 – 2001) (won Drama Desk Award for Outstanding Revue)
- Forbidden Broadway 20th Anniversary Celebration (May 10, 2001 – 2004)
- Forbidden Broadway Summer Shock II (July 5, 2004 – September 15, 2004)
- Forbidden Vegas (2005)
- Forbidden Broadway: Special Victims Unit (December 16, 2004 – April 15, 2007) (won Drama Desk Award for Outstanding Revue)
- Forbidden Broadway: The Roast of Utopia (June 13, 2007 – August 22, 2007)
- Forbidden Broadway: Rude Awakening (October 2, 2007 – March 24, 2008) (won Drama Desk Award for Outstanding Revue)
- Forbidden Broadway Goes to Rehab (September 17, 2008 – March 1, 2009)
- Forbidden Broadway: Alive and Kicking! (July 24, 2012 – April 28, 2013)
- Forbidden Broadway Comes Out Swinging (February 22, 2014 – July 20, 2014)
- Forbidden Broadway: West End (September 9, 2014 – November 22, 2014)
- Forbidden Broadway: The Next Generation (September 18, 2019 – November 29, 2019)
- Forbidden Broadway: Merrily We Stole a Song (September 19, 2024–present) (won Drama Desk Award for Outstanding Revue)

== Albums ==
- Forbidden Broadway, Vol. 1 – 1984
- Forbidden Broadway, Vol. 2 – 1991
- Forbidden Broadway, Vol. 3 – 1994
- Forbidden Hollywood – 1995
- Forbidden Broadway Strikes Back – 1996
- Forbidden Broadway Cleans Up Its Act – 1999
- Forbidden Broadway: 20th Anniversary Edition – 2000
- Forbidden Broadway 2001: A Spoof Odyssey – 2001
- Forbidden Broadway: Special Victims Unit – 2005
- Forbidden Broadway: Rude Awakening – 2008
- Forbidden Broadway Goes to Rehab – 2009
- Forbidden Broadway: Alive & Kicking! – 2012
- Forbidden Broadway Comes Out Swinging! – 2014
- Forbidden Broadway: The Next Generation! – 2020

== See also ==
- Spamilton (2016–2017)
- Forbidden Hollywood
- The Musical of Musicals (The Musical!)
