= Christine Pedi =

American television and theatre actress

Christine Pedi (born October 24, 1961) is an American singer and actress, as well as a cabaret performer and radio personality.

== Early life ==
Pedi was born in Yonkers, New York, lived in the Bronx and then moved to Eastchester, New York. She attended a parochial girls high school and did plays. She attended Fordham University, where she discovered radio hosting. After graduation she worked for the March of Dimes, while performing in community theatre.

== Career ==
=== Theatre ===
Pedi has appeared in three Broadway productions:

- Little Me; musical; 1998 revival in several roles, including Maid, Ms. Kepplewhite, and Secretary
- Talk Radio; play; 2007 original cast as "Rachel" and Callers' Voices
- Chicago; musical; beginning April 8, 2013 to June 23, 2013 as Matron "Mama" Morton

She appeared in the one-night concert of Funny Girl in September 2002, as a benefit for The Actors' Fund.

She appeared Off-Broadway in composer-lyricist Rick Crom's NEWSical the Musical opening on December 13, 2010 at The Kirk at Theatre Row. A new version, NEWSical the Musical: End of the World Edition opened on February 1, 2012 at Theatre Row.

==== Forbidden Broadway ====
Pedi appeared Off-Broadway in several Forbidden Broadway productions. She appeared in Forbidden Broadway 1994 opening on November 11, 1993 at Theater East. She performed in Forbidden Broadway Strikes Back which opened on October 17, 1996 at the Triad Theatre She appeared in Forbidden Broadway 2001: A Spoof Odyssey which opened in October 2000 at Ellen's Stardust Diner. She performed two songs on the recording of Forbidden Broadway: Special Victim's Unit which opened at the Douglas Fairbanks Theatre in December 2004.

She also appeared in Forbidden Hollywood, which ran the Triad Theatre from March 10, 1996 to September 1, 1996. Prior to the New York engagement, Pedi appeared in Forbidden Hollywood at the Coronet Theatre, West Hollywood, California from April through May 28, 1995.

Robin Pogrebin, writing in The New York Times, observed: "Watch her contort her mouth as she morphs into Patti LuPone or widen her eyes as she channels Carol Channing, and it is clear that what Ms. Pedi makes look easy is difficult and rare. Reviewing the latest edition of Forbidden Broadway in The New York Times, Ben Brantley called Ms. Pedi, who has played the most performances of any cast member, 'the sharpest caricaturist of the group.'" Pogrebin quotes Gerard Alessandrini: "Ms. Pedi was notable not just for her ability to caricature actresses but also to conjure them. 'She's more than a mimic', he said. 'She's zeroing in on what makes them tick.'"

She also appeared as Bernadette Peters, Barbra Streisand, Carol Channing, Liza Minnelli and Patti LuPone in Gerard Alessandrini's musical parody Spamilton in the original Off-Broadway production (2016) and the Chicago production (2017).

=== Television ===
She appeared in two episodes in Season 4 (2002) of the television series The Sopranos as Karen Baccalieri. Dana Polan (Professor of Cinema Studies at the Tisch School of the Arts, New York University) wrote that the death of Baccalieri "had narrative convulsions that would play through later seasons."

More recently, in 2017, she voiced Holly Blue Agate in the animated series Steven Universe episodes "Gem Heist" and "That Will Be All", and in 2019 she reprised her role as Holly Blue Agate in the Steven Universe Future episode "Rose Buds". Pedi also provided a voice in the recently found Cyberchase pilot, although it is currently unknown which character(s) she voiced.

=== Other work ===
As a cabaret performer she has traveled with her show Great Dames, reviving the show in 2007 at the Metropolitan Room. She performed the Great Dames cabaret act at the Jermyn Street Theatre, London, in June 2009. She won the 2008 Nightlife Award in Manhattan for Great Dames.

She is also a disc jockey and radio host for The Broadway Breakfast with Christine Pedi and Dueling Divas (with co-host Seth Rudetsky), radio shows on the On Broadway channel on Sirius/XM Satellite Radio. Her previous work at Sirius/XM Satellite Radio includes The Broadway Buzz (2008-2011), replaced by Erin McIntyre (2011-2013), and Julie James (2013-present).

=== Theatre awards nominations ===
She was nominated for a 1996 Drama Desk Award, Outstanding Featured Actress in a Musical and an Ovation Award for her work in Forbidden Hollywood.
