= Forbidden Hollywood (parody) =

Forbidden Hollywood is a parody show that opened Off-Off-Broadway and was taped live in Hollywood. It was created by Gerard Alessandrini, who also created the popular series of Off-Broadway parodies of Broadway theatre, Forbidden Broadway. But this production, instead of spoofing Broadway, lampooned popular films such as Forrest Gump, Sense and Sensibility, Pulp Fiction, Casablanca, The Wizard of Oz and Disney's Aladdin, and songs featured in them, although most of the score consists of songs from musicals used to comment on the films. It also spoofs movie stars like Tom Hanks, Keanu Reeves, Barbra Streisand, Ann-Margret and Whoopi Goldberg. A New York Times reviewer wrote that although the production had funny moments, "the tone that defines the show is a glib disaffection for Hollywood", lamenting that the show missed the opportunity to use more songs from films, and concluding: "It's fine if Mr. Alessandrini wants to see Hollywood as the enemy, but you have to know your enemy to take good aim at it."

Alessandrini released an album to accompany the show in 1995. The album was released by Varèse Sarabande Records, recorded live in Hollywood, and features the original cast members, many of whom also have appeared in Forbidden Broadway. Alessandrini wrote the "new" parody lyrics, and Phillip George (associate director and choreographer) wrote many of the sketches.

== Original cast ==
- Susanne Blakeslee*
- Brad Ellis*
- Jason Graae*
- Gerry McIntyre
- Christine Pedi*

Note: (*) indicates that this person performed in earlier Forbidden Broadway shows

== Tracks ==
The numbers on the album are listed below, noting the songs they spoof, and the original composers/lyricists.

- 1. Forrest Gump – Life Is Like a Box of Chocolates ("Life Is Just a Bowl of Cherries", Henderson-DeSylva-Brown)
- 2. Forbidden Hollywood (original, Alessandrini)
- 3. They Shouldn't Be in Pictures ("You Oughta Be in Pictures", Suesse-Heyman)
- 4. Aladdin – A Disney World ("A Whole New World", Menken-Rice)
- 5. Dorothy And Toto – Somewhere Under the Rainbow ("Somewhere Over the Rainbow", Arlen-Harburg)
- 6. Doris Day – Darling Doris Day ("Que Sera, Sera", Livingston-Evans)
- 7. DreamWorks Triplets ("Triplets", Schwartz-Dietz)
- 8. Marlene Dietrich – Falling Apart Again ("Falling in Love Again (Can't Help It)", Hollander-Lerner)
- 9. Hits And Bombs Sequence
  - Hits and Bombs ("Guys and Dolls", Loesser)
  - Blurry Hues ("Bali Ha'i", Rodgers-Hammerstein)
  - Marlon Brando: You'll Know ("I'll Know", Loesser)
  - Louis and Barbra: Shut Up, Barbra! ("Hello, Dolly!", Herman)
- 10. Waterworld – I'll Blow the Budget of Waterworld ("I'll Build a Staircase to Paradise", Gershwin-Gershwin-DeSylva)
- 11. Oscar Sequence
- 12. Tom Hanks – Gump, the Magic Movie ("Puff, the Magic Dragon", Yarrow-Lipton)
- 13. Rosie Perez – Mama Yo Quiero ("I Want My Momma", Jararaca-Paiva-Stillman)
- 14 Pulp Fiction – Make 'Em Bleed ("Make 'Em Laugh", Brown-Freed)
- 15. Summer Movies ("Summer Nights", Jacobs)
- 16. O-Todd-Ao ("Oklahoma", Rodgers-Hammerstein)
- 17. Sharon Stone ("Rawhide", Tiamkin-Washington)
- 18. Mary Poppins – Stupidcarelessfictionalnonsensicalverboseness ("Supercalifragilisticexpialidocious", Sherman-Sherman)
- 19. Audrey Hepburn – Dub Me ("Show Me", Lerner-Lowe)
- 20. Bette Midler – Who's Gay in Hollywood ("Hooray for Hollywood", Whiting-Mercer)
- 21. Ann-Margret – Bye Bye Thirty ("Bye Bye Birdie", Strouse-Adams)
- 22. Liza Minnelli – Mein Film Career ("Mein Herr", Kander-Ebb)
- 23 Gene Kelly – My Singin' Is a Pain ("Singin' in the Rain", Brown-Freed)
- 24 Barbra Streisand – Most Men ("My Man (Mon Homme)", Yrain-Pollick)
- 25 Finale
  - As Time Drags By ("As Time Goes By", Hupfeld)
  - Casablanca Sequence (Hupfeld)
- 26 Bows (original, Alessandrini)

== See also ==
- Forbidden Broadway
