= Gerard Alessandrini =

Writer-Director-Lyricist-Composer

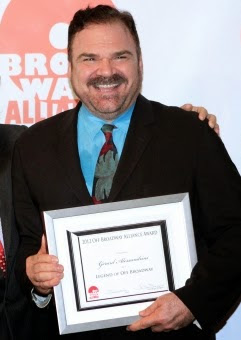
- Born: November 27, 1953 (age 72); Boston, Massachusetts, United States
- Education: Xaverian Brothers High School; Boston Conservatory of Music
- Occupations: writer, director, lyricist, composer
- Writing career
- Notable work: Forbidden Broadway (2001) Spamilton (2016)
- Notable awards: -Tony Honors for Excellence in Theatre -Obie Award -Drama Desk Award for Outstanding Lyrics -Drama Desk Special Award) -Outer Critics Circle Award -Lucille Lortel Awards -Drama League Award for Lifetime Achievement in Musical Theatre

Gerard Alessandrini (born November 27, 1953) is an American writer, director, lyricist and composer, best known for creating the off-Broadway musical revue Forbidden Broadway. He is the recipient of Tony Honors for Excellence in Theatre, four Drama Desk Awards (two for Outstanding Lyrics and two special awards for Lifetime Achievement), an Outer Critics Circle Award, and two Lucille Lortel Awards, as well as an Obie Award, and the Drama League Award for Lifetime Achievement in Musical Theatre.

== Life and career ==
Alessandrini was born in Boston, Massachusetts, grew up in suburban Needham, and graduated from Xaverian Brothers High School in 1972. After graduating from the Boston Conservatory of Music in 1977, he moved to New York City. As a young actor, he appeared in summer stock, regional theater, and dinner theater productions of Kismet, The Fantasticks, Oklahoma! and Carousel, among others. He also worked at the off-Broadway Light Opera of Manhattan.

In late 1981, Alessandrini conceived and wrote a musical parody revue featuring spoofs of songs from Broadway musicals, on which he had been working while employed as a waiter at Lincoln Center. After a few months of weekend performances starring Alessandrini and a few friends at Palsson's Supper Club, the show evolved into Forbidden Broadway, which opened on January 15, 1982 at Palsson's Supper Club, with a cast featuring Alessandrini, Nora Mae Lyng, Bill Carmichael, Chloe Webb, and Fred Barton. The revue caught the theatergoing public's attention after Rex Reed published a rave review and ultimately ran for 2,332 performances at Palsson's before moving on to other larger venues. It has subsequently been rewritten many times to include parodies of newer shows, and has had many different editions presented in New York City for more than 40 years. In 2006, the show and Alessandrini won Tony Honors for Excellence in Theatre. The most recent incarnation, Forbidden Broadway: Merrily We Stole a Song, played Off-Broadway in 2024.

As a performer, Alessandrini can be heard on five of the 13 Forbidden Broadway cast albums, as well as the soundtracks of Disney's animated films Aladdin and Pocahontas. He also co-wrote (with Pete Blue) and performed in the television parody Masterpiece Tonight, a satirical salute to the 20th anniversary of Masterpiece Theatre. In 1995, some of his sketches were featured in Carol Burnett’s CBS special, Men, Movies and Carol. He has also written comedy specials for Bob Hope and Angela Lansbury for NBC, as well as special material for Barbra Streisand's second duets album.

Alessandrini's directorial credits include a production of Maury Yeston's In The Beginning and a revue of Yeston's music and lyrics entitled Anything Can Happen In The Theater. He also "politically updated" and directed a tongue-in-cheek adaptation of the 1962 Irving Berlin musical Mr. President. In 2011, he co-created the musical comedy The Nutcracker and I, with music by Tchaikovsky, book by Peter Brash and lyrics by Alessandrini. The musical debuted at the George Street Playhouse in New Brunswick, New Jersey.

In 2016, Alessandrini wrote and directed Spamilton, which premiered at the Triad Theater in New York and subsequently played in London, Los Angeles and Chicago. The show parodies Hamilton and other Broadway musicals, and caricatures various Broadway stars.

In recent years, Alessandrini has continued to update both Forbidden Broadway and Spamilton. His original musicals include Madame X, written with Robert Hetzel, which was presented at part of the New York Musical Theatre Festival (NYMF) in 2011; and a musical version of Moon Over Parador, written with Paul Mazursky and Bill Conti.

== Personal life ==
Alessandrini currently lives with his husband, designer-artist-writer Glenn Bassett, in Connecticut.
