= Categories: On the Beauty of Physics =

Book by Hilary Thayer Hamann

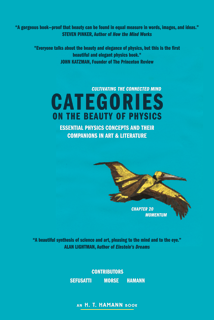
- Hardcover edition
- Author: Hilary Thayer Hamann
- Language: English
- Subject: Physics
- Genre: Non-fiction
- Publisher: Vernacular Press
- Publication date: January 2006
- Publication place: United States
- Media type: Print
- Pages: 280 pp.
- ISBN: 978-0974026633
- Preceded by: Anthropology of an American Girl

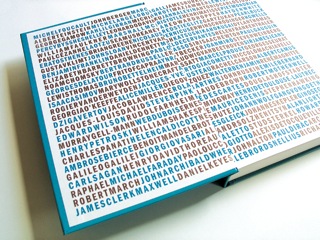
The book's endleaf

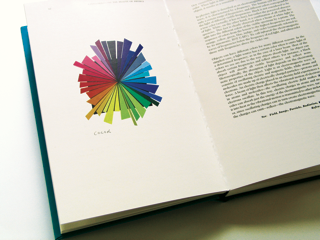
A selection from the book

Categories: On the Beauty of Physics is a non-fiction science and art book edited, co-written, and published by American author Hilary Thayer Hamann in 2006. The book was conceived as a multidisciplinary educational tool that uses art and literature to broaden the reader's understanding of challenging material. Alan Lightman, author of Einstein's Dreams, called Categories "A beautiful synthesis of science and art, pleasing to the mind and to the eye," and Dr. Helen Caldicott, founder and president of the Nuclear Policy Research Institute, said, "This wonderful book will provoke thought in lovers of science and art alike, and with knowledge comes the inspiration to preserve the beauty of life on Earth."

== Author ==
Hamann is co-writer, creative and editorial director of Categories—On the Beauty of Physics (2006), a multidisciplinary, interdisciplinary educational text that uses imagery to facilitate the reader's encounter with challenging material. She worked with physicist Emiliano Seffusati, Ph.D., who wrote the science text, and collage artist John Morse, who created the original artwork.

== Overview ==
Categories is a book about physics that uses literature and art to stimulate the wonder and interest of the reader. It is intended to promote scientific literacy, foster an appreciation of the humanities, and encourage readers to make informed and imaginative connections between the sciences and the arts.

Hamann intended the physics book to be the first in a series, with subsequent titles to focus on biology and chemistry, and for the three titles to form the cornerstone of a television series for adolescents and their parents.

== Criticism ==
Library Journal gave the book a starred review, calling Categories "a gorgeous book," "a comprehensive overview of physics," and "highly recommended."

The book received high praise from critics and scientists.

Cognitive scientist, Harvard professor, and author of The Language Instinct (1994), and How the Mind Works (1997) Steven Pinker called it "A gorgeous book—proof that beauty can be found in equal measure in words, images, and ideas." Henry Petroski, author of The Evolution of Useful Things (1992), praised it as "A remarkable example of what wondrous things can come of a fruitful collaboration among scientists, writers, and artists. This book is an outstanding testament to the inherent interdependence of all human thought and creativity." Science historian, author, and television producer James Burke, author of Connections (1978) called it "An extraordinary, beautiful, and stimulating book. The physics texts are jewels of descriptive clarity and, in the weave of science with the arts, there are moments of true revelation. In a world of growing interdependence, this book is a must-read." John Katzman, founder of The Princeton Review, said, "Everyone talks about the beauty and elegance of physics, but this is the first beautiful and elegant physics book." Raina Lampkins-Fielder, education chair of The Whitney Museum, stated, "By weaving together the worlds of science, literature, and art while also providing thoughtful suggestions for active learning, this book invites the reader on a creative and liberating journey of the mind. Categories—On the Beauty of Physics is a wonderful educational tool for both the child and the adult, both the novice and the expert."

== Recognition ==
Categories received a "Regional Design" award from Print Magazine, and ForeWord Magazine's "Education Book of the Year, 2006."

Categories, which sold out of its initial print run, has been used as a teaching tool in colleges and is available in hundreds of libraries. In September 2009, Louisiana State University included it on the list of top 25 non-fiction books written since 1950. Also on the list are Alexander Solzhenitsyn's The Gulag Archipelago, Edward W. Said's Orientalism, Rachel Carson's Silent Spring, and Maya Angelou's I Know Why the Caged Bird Sings.
