= The Scarlet Pimpernel (musical) =

Musical by Frank Wildhorn and Nan Knighton

- Original cast recording
- Music: Frank Wildhorn
- Lyrics: Nan Knighton
- Book: Nan Knighton
- Basis: The Scarlet Pimpernel by Baroness Orczy
- Productions: 1997 Broadway; 1998 Broadway; 1999 U.S. national tour 1999 Broadway; 2000 U.S. national tour

The Scarlet Pimpernel is a musical with music by Frank Wildhorn and lyrics & book by Nan Knighton, based on the 1905 novel of the same name by Baroness Orczy. The show is set in England and France during the Reign of Terror of the French Revolution. The story is a precursor to the spy fiction and the superhero genres, where a hero hides under a mild-mannered alias.

The musical ran on Broadway from October 1997 to May 1999 at the Minskoff Theatre, closed, toured, and reopened from September 1999 to January 2000 at the Neil Simon Theatre, in several versions. It also had a US National tour, and regional and international productions followed.

== Productions ==
The Scarlet Pimpernel started as a workshop with Carolee Carmello as Marguerite and directed by Nick Corley, following a concept album (and Top 40 Adult Contemporary Hit - "You Are My Home").

The musical debuted on Broadway at the Minskoff Theatre on October 7, 1997, in previews, and opened officially on November 9, 1997. Directed by Peter H. Hunt, it starred Douglas Sills (Sir Percy Blakeney), Christine Andreas (Marguerite St. Just), Terrence Mann (Citizen Chauvelin), Marine Jahan (Madame St. Cyr), Elizabeth Ward Land (Marie), Gilles Chiasson (Armand St. Just), Ed Dixon (Ozzy), Bill Bowers (Leggett), and David Cromwell (Robespierre/Prince of Wales/Fisherman). In June, shortly before the Tony Awards were announced, the show was slated to close. The production was nominated for Tony Awards for best musical, book and leading actor in a musical. With falling ticket sales, the show suspended performances on October 1, 1998. It reopened with Sills and three new leads, Rex Smith, Rachel York and James Bohanek, and a vastly rearranged production, on October 10, 1998. It closed at the Minskoff Theatre on May 30, 1999.

The musical had a mini-tour of a scaled-down version in mid-1999 with three new leads. The revised version (called the 3.0 version) opened on Broadway at the Neil Simon Theatre on September 7, 1999, closing on January 2, 2000, after a total of 772 performances and 39 previews, among the three versions of the show on Broadway. The Neil Simon cast starred Ron Bohmer, Marc Kudisch and Carolee Carmello. Like Wildhorn's two other big budget Broadway efforts (Jekyll & Hyde and The Civil War), the musical lost money.

A US national tour played from February 20, 2000, through April 1, 2001, directed and choreographed by Robert Longbottom with Sills re-creating his role, Amy Bodnar as Marguerite and William Paul Michals as Chauvelin. During the tour, Sills was replaced by Robert Patteri and finally Ron Bohmer.

Takarazuka Revue in Japan produced the musical from June to October 2008, performed by the group's Star Troupe. It starred Kei Aran as Percy, Asuka Tono as Marguerite, and Reon Yuzuki as Chauvelin. It was revived by the Revue from April to June 2010, this time by the Moon Troupe. Hiromu Kiriya and Yuki Aono starred as Percy and Marguerite, respectively, with Masaki Ryuu and Rio Asumi double-cast as Chauvelin. It was again staged by the Star Troupe from March to June 2017, starring Yuzuru Kurenai as Percy, Airi Kisaki as Marguerite and Makoto Rei as Chauvelin.

The musical has also received numerous regional US productions and has been produced in Germany, Finland, the Netherlands, United Kingdom, Ireland, Sweden, Canada, Mexico, Malta and Norway, among others. A one-night concert version in 2019 at Lincoln Center starred Tony Yazbeck as Percy, Laura Osnes as Marguerite, Norm Lewis as Chauvelin, Corey Cott as Armand, and Drew Gehling as Prince of Wales/Robespierre.

== Plot ==
=== Act 1 ===
The play opens at La Comédie Française, a theatre where Marguerite St. Just is performing in her final show ("Storybook"). As she announces to the crowd her marriage to wealthy English aristocrat Sir Percy Blakeney. Citizen Chauvelin, a fanatical agent of the French republican revolutionaries, closes the theatre before the performance is finished. Percy, Marguerite, and her brother, Armand, leave for England, and Chauvelin oversees the execution of the Marquis de St.-Cyr by guillotine in the miserable streets of Paris ("Madame Guillotine").

Percy and Marguerite wed in England ("Believe"). However, on the night of their wedding, Percy learns that his wife betrayed the Marquis de St.-Cyr, his friend, to the revolutionary government ("Wedding Dance"). Heartbroken, Percy is torn between his love for Marguerite and the knowledge of what she has done ("Prayer"). The Blakeneys' marriage grows cold.

Percy determines to make amends for his friend's death by saving other innocents from the guillotine. He takes on the identity of the Scarlet Pimpernel and convinces some of his friends (subsequently called "bounders") to join him in his daring rescue attempts; Armand, Marguerite's brother, insists on being included ("Into the Fire"). The band pretend to be inane fops, effectively throwing off any suspicions about the identity of the League of the Scarlet Pimpernel. Under Percy's strict orders, Marguerite is told nothing.

Over the next five weeks, the League rescues many potential victims of the guillotine in Paris ("The Rescue"). The furious Robespierre orders Chauvelin to discover the identity of the Scarlet Pimpernel with the help of a Belgian spy named Grappin (Percy in disguise). Frustrated, Chauvelin vows to succeed ("Falcon in the Dive").

Back in England, Marie, Marguerite's old costume designer and best friend, has come to the Blakeney estate and is painting Percy's portrait. The Blakeneys' maids gossip about the Scarlet Pimpernel with Percy, who continues his foppish act ("Scarlet Pimpernel Transition"). Marguerite cannot understand how Percy is so drastically different from the man whom she married ("When I Look At You").

Informed that she has a visitor in the garden, Marguerite goes outside. Percy looks out at her in awe, yet remains confused about how he should act around her ("When I Look At You (Reprise)"). Marguerite's visitor turns out to be Chauvelin, who attempts to convince her to join him in his mission to unmask the Pimpernel, as the French believe he is a member of the Blakeney's circle. Percy joins the conversation and perplexes Chauvelin with his ridiculous ways. When Percy leaves, Chauvelin tries to remind Marguerite of the fiery passion they once shared for the Revolution and each other ("Where's the Girl?"). Marguerite rejects Chauvelin's advances and sends him away.

Armand, just returned from a trip for the League, tells Marguerite that he is going on another trip, this time to France. She becomes upset because she believes that Armand is putting himself in danger—and because he is the only one whom Marguerite feels truly loves her. Marguerite begs Armand to stay, but after trying to comfort her, he leaves, taking Marie back to Paris with him to assist the League ("You Are My Home").

Percy tells his remaining men that the Prince of Wales, suspicious of their trips to France, wants to meet with them. To allay the Prince's suspicions, Percy shows the League how it is a man's duty to dress elegantly and flamboyantly, and they all display the latest fashion ("The Creation of Man"). At the palace, the League convinces the Prince that they have nothing to do with the Pimpernel's activities.

Chauvelin arrives to meet with the Prince but is brushed aside so that the League can help the Prince select his attire for the royal ball that night. Having received a note from Chauvelin, Marguerite meets him at the palace, and Chauvelin once again enlists her aid. Armand has been captured in France, and Chauvelin threatens to have him guillotined if Marguerite refuses to help find the Pimpernel ("Marguerite's Dilemma (Instrumental)"). Both Marguerite and Chauvelin wonder if they can trust each other; Percy finds them talking and wonders if he, too, can trust his wife ("The Riddle").

=== Act 2 ===
At the Prince's ball ("Entr'acte (Instrumental)"), Percy and the other guests discuss the Pimpernel, who they all know is there that evening ("The Scarlet Pimpernel"). Percy then recites a poem he has created in honor of the Pimpernel, and the guests join in ("They Seek Him Here").

Marguerite, desperate, convinces one of Percy's men to ask the Pimpernel to meet her on the footbridge at one o'clock ("The Gavotte"). She informs Chauvelin of the plan and goes to the footbridge. Percy comes but remains hidden in the shadows, keeping his identity concealed. Marguerite tells him of Chauvelin's plans and explains that she betrayed the Marquis de St.-Cyr under coercion. Torn, Marguerite begs the Pimpernel to escape before Chauvelin arrives, but the Pimpernel promises to save Armand and sends Marguerite away. Overjoyed, Percy now understands why he has loved Marguerite all along—and that she has always remained the same ("She Was There"). Chauvelin arrives, but Percy's antics fluster him into leaving without discovering the Pimpernel's identity. The League then sets out for France to save Armand.

Still unaware of the Pimpernel's identity, Marguerite does the same. Disguised as a tart, Marguerite attempts to uncover information about her brother, but she is quickly recognized and apprehended by Chauvelin ("Storybook (Reprise)"). While Chauvelin admires Marguerite's courageous efforts, he is angry that she was defying his threats, and he sends her to prison with Armand.

Unable to get access to Marguerite and Armand, Grappin poses a plot to Chauvelin to have Armand lead them to the secret harbor that the League uses, where they can capture the entire group. Grappin tries to convince Chauvelin to let him dispose of Marguerite, but Chauvelin orders him to stick to the plan. Alone, Chauvelin rages over his failure to win Marguerite back ("Where's the Girl? (Reprise)").

The League meets with Percy, Marie, and Tussaud (Marie's fiancé) in Paris to try to find a way to save Marguerite and Armand. Unable to get close to them, even disguised as Grappin, Percy starts to think the situation is almost hopeless. He vows to go it alone, not wanting the rest of the League to continue to risk themselves, but they reassuredly state they will stand by him ("Into the Fire (Reprise)").

In prison, Armand assures Marguerite that the Pimpernel will save them. Refusing to believe it, Marguerite mourns the loss of Percy and of her life ("I'll Forget You"). However, the two are "rescued" by "League members" and set off for the League's harbor at the coastal town of Michelon, having no idea that Chauvelin is on their trail. On the way, Marguerite learns her husband's secret identity.

At Michelon, Marguerite and Armand discover that a guillotine has been erected at the harbour. Chauvelin and his soldiers arrive, and when Marguerite desperately calls for Percy to run, Chauvelin finally begins to suspect who his adversary truly is.

Grappin turns up and informs Chauvelin that the Pimpernel—who Grappin confirms is Sir Percy Blakeney—is heading for Calais. Chauvelin sends some of his men off to intercept the Pimpernel but still keeps soldiers to assist him. When Percy "accidentally" lets his identity slip, he and Chauvelin duel. Marguerite steps in several times to help Percy, but Chauvelin still wins ("The Duel"). Percy is then immediately guillotined.

Confident in his triumph, Chauvelin sends most of his remaining soldiers away to carry the news to Robespierre, leaving only a small squad. However, to Chauvelin's utter bewilderment, Percy stands up from the guillotine unharmed. The head that fell is, in fact, a wax one that Marie (who, having married Tussaud, is revealed to be Marie Tussaud) created to fool Chauvelin. The whole duel and execution was but a ruse to lull Chauvelin into a sense of overconfidence and send the majority of his forces away. The remaining soldiers turn out to be the League in disguise.

Percy's men tie up Chauvelin and leave him with planted evidence incriminating him as the Scarlet Pimpernel. Percy, Marguerite, Armand, and the bounders then set off for England. Marguerite and Percy confide in each other the true love that they have always had for each other ("Believe (Reprise)").

== Songs ==
Act I

- Overture - Orchestra
- Storybook - Marguerite & Ensemble
- Madame Guillotine - Chauvelin, St. Cyr & Ensemble
- You Are My Home, Wedding Dance, Prayer - Percy, Marguerite & Ensemble
- Prayer - Percy
- Into the Fire - Percy, Armand, Ozzy, Dewhurst, Elton, Farleigh, Hal & Ben
- Falcon In the Dive - Chauvelin
- Scarlet Pimpernel Transition - Percy, Marie, Marguerite & Girls
- When I Look at You - Marguerite
- When I Look at You (Reprise) - Percy & Marguerite
- Where's The Girl? - Chauvelin
- You Are My Home (Garden Reprise) - Marguerite & Armand
- The Creation of Man - Percy, Ozzy, Dewhurst, Elton, Farleigh, Hal & Ben
- Marguerite's Dilemma - Orchestra
- The Riddle - Chauvelin, Marguerite, Percy & Ensemble

Act II

- Entr'acte - Orchestra
- Opening Act II - Percy, Marguerite & Ensemble
- The Scarlet Pimpernel
- They Seek Him Here - Percy, Marguerite, Chauvelin, Elton, Farleigh, Dewhurst, Ozzy, Prince of Wales & Ensemble
- Ouilles Gavotte
- She Was There - Percy
- Storybook (Bistro Reprise) - Marguerite & Ensemble
- Where's The Girl? (Reprise) - Chauvelin
- Into The Fire (Reprise) - Ozzy, Dewhurst, Farleigh, Elton, Hal & Ben
- I'll Forget You - Marguerite
- The Duel - Orchestra
- Finale/When I Look at You (Reprise) - Marguerite, Percy & Ensemble
- Bows/Into the Fire (Reprise) - Percy & Company
- Exit Music - Orchestra

== Cast lists ==
Character	Original Broadway Cast	1999 Broadway Cast	2000 US National Tour Cast
Percy	Douglas Sills	Ron Bohmer	Douglas Sills
Marguerite	Christine Andreas	Carolee Carmello	Amy Bodnar
Chauvelin	Terrence Mann	Marc Kudisch	William Michals
Armand St. Just	Gilles Chiasson	Kirk McDonald	Martin K. Thomas
Robespierre / Prince of Wales	David Cromwell	Billy Sharpe	David Cromwell
Marie	Elizabeth Ward Land	Elizabeth Ward Land	Elizabeth Ward Land

== Awards and nominations ==
=== Original Broadway production ===
Year	Award	Category	Nominee	Result
1998	Tony Award	Best Musical		Nominated
1998	Tony Award	Best Book of a Musical	Nan Knighton	Nominated
1998	Tony Award	Best Performance by a Leading Actor in a Musical	Douglas Sills	Nominated
1998	Drama Desk Award	Outstanding Actor in a Musical	Douglas Sills	Nominated
1998	Drama Desk Award	Outstanding Music	Frank Wildhorn	Nominated
1998	Theatre World Award		Douglas Sills	Won
1998	Outer Critics Circle Award	Best Broadway Musical		Nominated
1998	Outer Critics Circle Award	Outstanding Actor in a Musical	Douglas Sills	Nominated
1998	Outer Critics Circle Award	Outstanding Costume Design	Jane Greenwood	Nominated
1998	Outer Critics Circle Award	Outstanding Lighting Design	Natasha Katz	Nominated
1998	Outer Critics Circle Award	Outstanding Costume Design	Jane Greenwood	Nominated
