= Hilary Thayer Hamann =

American author (born 1962)

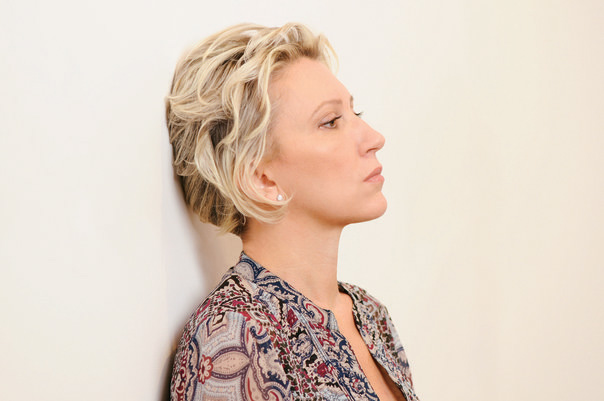
- Hamann in March 2010
- Born: November 7, 1962 (age 63); New York City
- Education: New York University
- Occupation: Writer
- Children: 3
- Writing career
- Notable work: Anthropology of an American Girl
- Website: www.hilarythayerhamann.com

Hilary Thayer Hamann (born November 7, 1962, in New York City) is an American author. Her first novel, Anthropology of an American Girl, is the story of a search for authenticity told in the first-person voice of teenaged protagonist Eveline Auerbach. The semi-autobiographical literary novel contains an examination of the social and cultural pressures that prevent individuals from living meaningfully. It was self-published in 2003, and then edited and re-released in 2010 by Spiegel & Grau, an imprint of Random House, both times to critical praise. The novel has been compared to J.D. Salinger's The Catcher in the Rye.

Hamann edited, co-wrote, and published a non-fiction science and art book, also to praise from critics, as well as from scientists and educators. Categories—On the Beauty of Physics (2006) was conceived as a multidisciplinary educational tool that uses art and literature to broaden the reader's understanding of challenging material. Alan Lightman, author of Einstein's Dreams, called Categories "A beautiful synthesis of science and art, pleasing to the mind and to the eye," and Dr. Helen Caldicott, founder and president of the Nuclear Policy Research Institute, said, "This wonderful book will provoke thought in lovers of science and art alike, and with knowledge comes the inspiration to preserve the beauty of life on Earth."

== Early years ==
Hamann was born in New York City. Following her parents' divorce, her time was divided between her mother's home in Manhattan and the home of her father and his extended family in the Bronx. When Hamann's mother moved to Long Island to take a job as a high school biology teacher at East Hampton High School, Hamann again split her time between family homes, spending summers in the Bronx and winters in the Hamptons.

As a young girl in the Hamptons, she became involved in community theater. From ages 9 to 19 she was involved in over 30 plays, including some produced at East Hampton's Guild Hall, in roles ranging from property mistress to female lead to writer and director. Hamann credits her experience in theater and the arts as a young person with having shaped her life.

Hamann attended New York University where she received a B.F.A. in Film & Television Production and Dramatic Writing from the Tisch School of the Arts, an M.A. in Cinema Studies from the Graduate School of Arts and Science, and a post-graduate certificate in Ethnographic Filmmaking from the Center for Media, Culture, and History. She was accepted into the graduate filmmaking program at Tisch, but declined to attend for personal reasons. She is a founding member of NYU's Tisch East Alumni Council.

== Career ==
Hamann was the assistant to former New York City Ballet principal dancer Jacques d'Amboise, who founded the National Dance Institute (NDI) and served as its artistic director, and to whom Hamann's second book on arts and education is dedicated. While at NDI, Hamann oversaw script and project development and she produced a short film titled We Real Cool, which was directed by Academy Award-winner Emile Ardolino and based on the Gwendolyn Brooks poem of the same name. Hamann began to write while working freelance jobs in New York's publishing, independent film, and television industries. She co-wrote, co-produced, and acted in an experimental 16mm film about a female artist and a vampire, In Full Cry (1988).

Hamann co-owned a product, print, and graphic design and production company based in Soho, New York City. It was this experience that inspired Hamann to start Vernacular Press, an independent publishing company with a focus on content development and book packaging. The small press was launched with the publication of Anthropology of an American Girl. Vernacular Press closed in 2007.

== Anthropology of an American Girl ==
Hamann wrote Anthropology of an American Girl, a semi-autobiographical coming-of-age story about Eveline Auerbach, a young woman growing up in Reagan-era America. Hamann was inspired to write the novel after taking graduate anthropology courses at NYU. The novel was first published by Vernacular Press in 2003. Hamann did not send the manuscript to agents or publishers until Vernacular closed in June 2007. Anthropology was purchased for publication two months later by Spiegel & Grau, and was re-released in May 2010. The paperback version was released in June 2011.

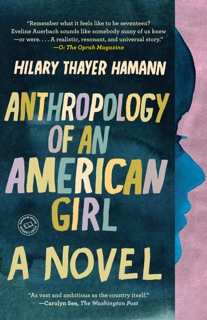
Spiegel & Grau paperback version, June 2011

The book was re-published in a version edited by Cindy Spiegel of Spiegel & Grau at Random House. It was published in Australia by Allen & Unwin, in Italy by Fandango Libri, and in the UK by Constable & Robinson.

Library Journal called the novel "Henry James meets the 21st Century," "intelligent and insightful." Also according to Library Journal, "Eveline, or Evie, is not a stereotypical 'American Girl'; nor is the book a standard coming-of-age story."

The Providence Journal cited the novel for its "gorgeous detail and nuanced thought" and "poetically rendered, astute perceptions." It stated that "Anthropology of an American Girl is an extraordinary debut, updating the 19th-century social-psychological novel of romance and manners. Like Jane Austen, George Eliot or Edith Wharton, H.T. Hamann critiques her era and culture through the tale of a precocious young woman buffeted by the accidents, values and consequences of her age."

Anthropology was praised by publications with diverse demographics. Ms. Magazine cited it for its "gorgeous language and brilliant observation," and Romantic Times Book Club Magazine called it a "magnificently intense love story," awarding the novel its highest possible rating.

The novel won a "Notable Fiction Award" from Writers' Notes (2004); ForeWord Magazine named it a Book of the Year "Fiction Finalist" (2003).

The novel received a starred review from Publishers Weekly, which called the book "exquisitely rendered," and added, "If publishers could figure out a way to turn crack into a book, it’d read a lot like this." Kirkus Reviews also gave the novel a starred review, calling it a "closely observed, Holden Caulfieldish story of teendom" that is "intelligent and without a false note—a memorable work." The review added that "Eveline is a marvelously complex and tragic figure of disconnection, startlingly real and exposed at all times."

O Magazine said that the novel is "a realistic, resonant, and universal story," adding that "Evie has a deadpan delivery Holden Caulfield might envy." The magazine also stated that "Hamann's depiction of time and place is stunningly accurate."

The Washington Post praised it as "a very respectable and serious descendant of the work of D.H. Lawrence," adding that Hamann had created "a carefully devised, coherent world, filled with opinions that need to be spoken—and heard." It also called the novel "A stern rebuke to chick lit everywhere," adding that the story "reminds us that all human lives are potentially sacred; that no lives should be judged and dismissed out of hand; that young women, though seen for eons as primarily just attractive objects, actually possess soul and will and sentience."

According to The Chicago Tribune, "Hamann has a hugely engaging voice and one that is rich with social and psychological insights."

The Dallas Morning News said, "This impressive debut is epic but not overwrought, and brilliant without the slightest hint of smugness. A rare kind of novel—at once sprawling and intimate—whose excellence matches its grand ambition."

The Chicago Sun-Times said that Anthropology "Showcases all the nuance and character insight of the masters. But it also has a thrilling contemporary edge that seems to just about perfectly capture the ethos, angst, and danger of a time close to our own," calling Hamann "one of the most engaging, evolving voices in contemporary fiction." Adding that, "The author is pitch perfect in rendering the times. It’s a time that’s post-postwar and pre-Internet, and it’s never seemed so intriguing."

East Hampton Independent called the novel "An ethnographic exploration of youth culture," "haunting, wise, and hip," with "its ear-perfect dialogue and erotic charge."

Respected book seller e-zine, Shelf Awareness, said that Anthropology is a "magnificent book," "incredibly intense and passionate," "romantic in the grand sense," "a rich, affecting experience," and "completely entrancing."

== Categories—On the Beauty of Physics ==
Hamann is co-writer, creative and editorial director of Categories—On the Beauty of Physics (2006), a multidisciplinary, interdisciplinary educational text that uses imagery to facilitate the reader's encounter with challenging material. She worked with physicist Emiliano Seffusati, PhD, who wrote the science text, and collage artist John Morse, who created the original artwork. Categories is a book about physics that uses literature and art to stimulate the wonder and interest of the reader. It is intended to promote scientific literacy, foster an appreciation of the humanities, and encourage readers to make informed and imaginative connections between the sciences and the arts.

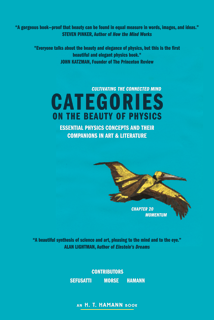
Categories—On the Beauty of Physics (Vernacular Press, 2005)

Hamann intended the physics book to be the first in a series, with subsequent titles to focus on biology and chemistry, and for the three titles to form the cornerstone of a television series for adolescents and their parents.

Library Journal gave the book a starred review, calling Categories "a gorgeous book," "a comprehensive overview of physics," and "highly recommended."

Cognitive scientist, Harvard professor, and author of The Language Instinct (1994) and How the Mind Works (1997), Steven Pinker called it "A gorgeous book—proof that beauty can be found in equal measure in words, images, and ideas." Henry Petroski, author of The Evolution of Useful Things (1992), praised it as "A remarkable example of what wondrous things can come of a fruitful collaboration among scientists, writers, and artists. This book is an outstanding testament to the inherent interdependence of all human thought and creativity." Science historian, author, and television producer James Burke, author of Connections (1978), called it, "An extraordinary, beautiful, and stimulating book. The physics texts are jewels of descriptive clarity and, in the weave of science with the arts, there are moments of true revelation. In a world of growing interdependence, this book is a must-read." John Katzman, founder of The Princeton Review, said, "Everyone talks about the beauty and elegance of physics, but this is the first beautiful and elegant physics book." Raina Lampkins-Fielder, education chair of The Whitney Museum, stated, "By weaving together the worlds of science, literature, and art while also providing thoughtful suggestions for active learning, this book invites the reader on a creative and liberating journey of the mind. Categories—On the Beauty of Physics is a wonderful educational tool for both the child and the adult, both the novice and the expert."

Categories received a "Regional Design" award from Print Magazine, and Foreword Magazine's "Education Book of the Year, 2006."

Categories has been used as a teaching tool in colleges. In September 2009, Louisiana State University included it on the list of top 25 non-fiction books written since 1950. Also on the list are Alexander Solzhenitsyn's The Gulag Archipelago, Edward W. Said's Orientalism, Rachel Carson's Silent Spring, and Maya Angelou's I Know Why the Caged Bird Sings.
