= Gilles Chiasson =

American actor

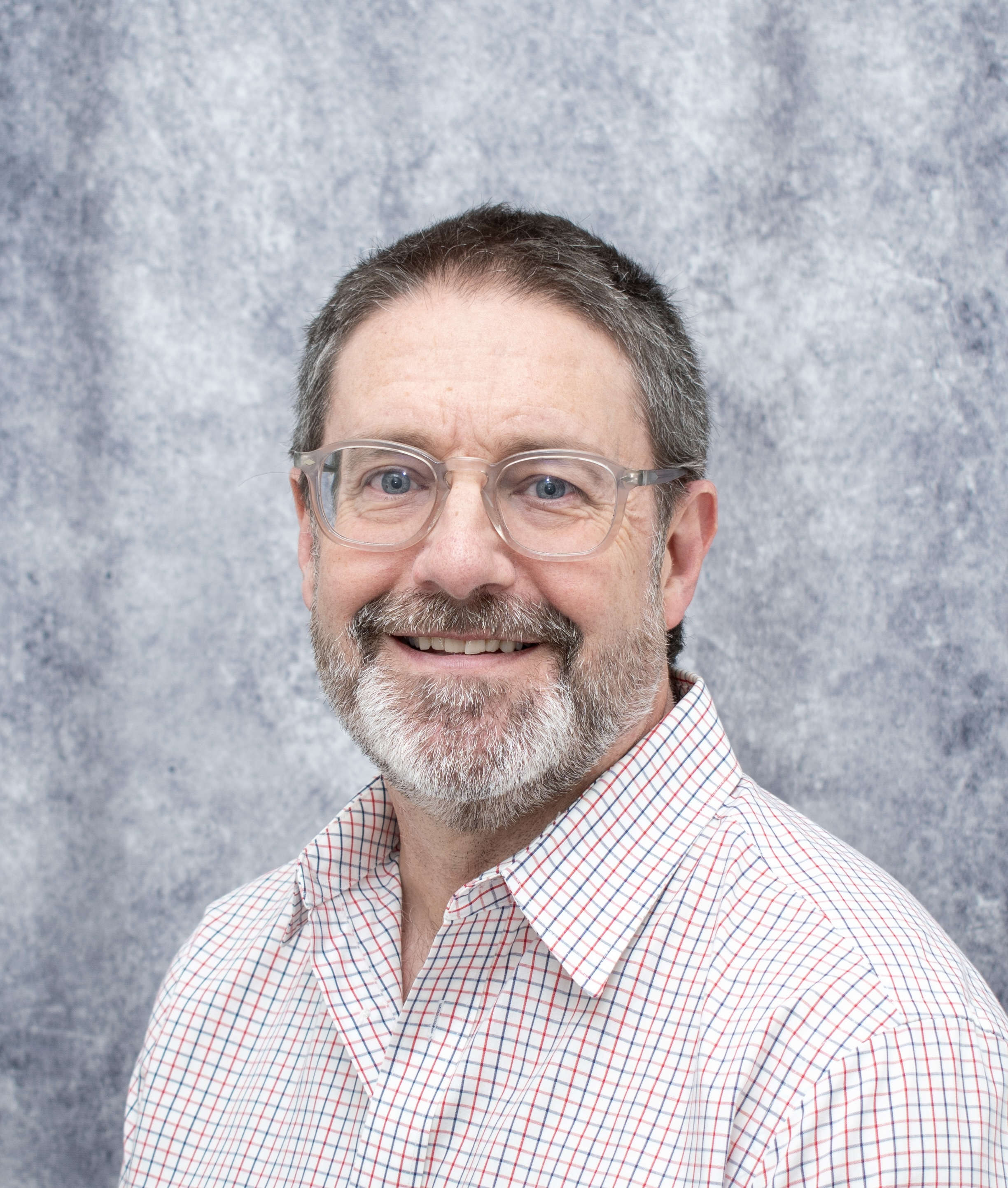
Gilles Chiasson Gilles Chiasson
- Born: November 1, 1966 (age 60); Muskegon, Michigan, U.S.
- Education: University of Michigan
- Occupations: Actor, composer, director, producer, writer
- Years active: 1994–present

Gilles Chiasson (born November 1, 1966) is an American producer, director, composer, writer, actor, and arts administrator. While he first came to prominence as an actor, particularly in the original cast of the Tony Award and Pulitzer Prize winning RENT, Chiasson went on to work in film and television development, then education, and now theater administration and operations. He currently lives in Los Angeles, California, with his wife Sherri Parker Lee and their two sons and works as Director of the Haugh Performing Arts Center (HPAC) on the campus of Citrus College.

== Early life ==
Chiasson was born in Muskegon, Michigan to Dr. Tony Chiasson, an anesthesiologist, and Claire Chiasson, the founder and former headmistress of Michigan Dunes Montessori. Both are French Canadian. He is the youngest of five children. He attended Mona Shores Public Schools. He received a Bachelor of Fine Arts (with High Distinction) from the School of Music, Theatre, and Dance at the University of Michigan.

== Career ==
=== Theatre ===
Soon after earning his BFA, Chiasson landed the role of the young idealist Marius in the National Tour of Les Misérables (musical). He followed this by portraying Jinx in the National Tour of Forever Plaid. However, Chiasson may be best known as an original cast member of Jonathan Larson's RENT.

Chiasson took part in the original RENT workshop in 1994 at the New York Theatre Workshop. (The only other Broadway cast members to do so were Anthony Rapp and Daphne Rubin-Vega.) He played multiple roles, including Squeegie Man and Steve, in the original Off-Broadway production, also at the New York Theatre Workshop, the following year. The show's creator, Jonathan Larson, died suddenly the night before the Off-Broadway premiere, but the production carried on and became a hit. Chiasson received an Obie Award as a member of the Off-Broadway cast. He reprised his multiple roles when RENT moved to Broadway in the spring of 1996. During his nearly two years in RENT on Broadway, Chiasson also played the lead roles of Mark and Roger.

Chiasson originated the roles of Armand St. Just in THE SCARLET PIMPERNEL and Corporal William McEwen in The Civil War (musical) on Broadway. Both shows were nominated for the Tony Award for Best Musical, and Chiasson received an Outer Critics Circle Nomination for Best Supporting Actor in a Musical for The Civil War (musical).

Chiasson theatre credits include many, many Off-Broadway and regional theatre productions, including the world premieres of the Mike Reid musical, A House Divided at Tennessee Repertory Theatre, Joanne Lessener and Joshua Rosenbaum's Fermat's Last Tango at the York Theatre, and Elizabeth Swados’ GROUNDHOG at Manhattan Theatre Club.

Chiasson's last appearance on Broadway was in the original cast of Baz Luhrmann's production of La bohème. He reprised his role when the show was remounted in the Ahmanson Theatre in Los Angeles, a move which led to his second act in production and development. Chiasson received Ovation Awards recognition for Ensemble Performance as a member of the LA Cast.

Chiasson has worked as a freelance director, New York, Los Angeles, and Chicago. His productions include Way of the Wiseguy (Chicago Center for the Performing Arts), I'm Sorry (The Lounge Theatre, LA; New York International Fringe Festival, Into the Woods and Heading Home (Performing Arts Education Centers).

Chiasson went on to serve as Producing Director of LA's Reprise Theatre Company, alongside artistic director, Jason Alexander, during their 2010-11 and 2011-12 Seasons. The company received 17 Ovation Awards nominations for Chiasson's inaugural season as Producing Director, the most of any theatre company in Southern California, ultimately winning the Ovation for Best Production of a Musical for their revival of Cole Porter's Kiss Me, Kate (musical) as well as a Los Angeles Drama Critics Circle Award for their production of Cabaret (musical) during their 2011–12 season. During his tenure at Reprise, Chiasson presented acclaimed artists such as Barry Manilow, Barbara Cook, Patti LuPone, Betty Buckley, Ray Romano, Martin Short, Seth Rudetsky and Sutton Foster in concert in venues throughout Los Angeles including the Saban Theatre in Beverly Hills and UCLA's Royce Hall.

From there, Chiasson went on to head up the LVUSD Beacon for the Arts Fund and serve as Director of Theater Operations of The Performing Arts Education Centers (the PAECs) located in Calabasas and Agoura Hills, CA. These two state-of-the-art theater complexes consist of two buildings in two locations, each having a 650+ seat Mainstage, a 100-seat Black Box, professionally equipped scene and costume shop, and all requisite support spaces.

Chiasson now serves as Director of the Haugh Performing Arts Center (HPAC) on the campus of Citrus College, a 1,440-seat proscenium venue which hosts over 140 performances annually, often exceeding 100,000 patrons in attendance.

As part of RENT's 30th Anniversary, Chiasson will appear along with the other original cast members at The Festival at the Hutton Brickyards in Kingston, New York on August 15, 2026. Then on Monday, October 26, 2026, he will appear in the cast of RENT, the 30th Anniversary Concert at Broadway's Richard Rodgers Theatre, helmed by original RENT Director, Michael Greif, and musical director, Tim Weil, and benefiting Broadway Cares/Equity Fights AIDS.

=== Film and television ===
From 2005 - 2010 Chiasson was the Director of Development for Moresco Productions. In that time he worked closely with Bobby Moresco, winner of the 2005 Academy Award for Best Original Screenplay for Crash (2004 film). Projects have included the television series The Black Donnellys for NBC and the adaptation of CRASH for Starz (TV channel). Chiasson has been integral to the evolution of several scripts, currently in development for both feature and television production. He is a Co-Producer of The Kings of Appletown starring the Sprouse twins famous for their work on Disney Channel’s The Suite Life of Zack & Cody.

=== Music ===
Chiasson wrote the music, lyrics and book of CHRYSALIS, an original musical that has been seen in workshops at the Alley Theatre in Houston, the New York Theatre Workshop and the Manhattan Theatre Club and premiered at the Adirondack Theatre Festival. His other musicals include FISHWRAP, co-conceived with Bill Castellino (Adirondack Theater Festival), MAPS and the movie musical MOVE AHEAD, with David Hilder (RAW Impressions NYC), and NOW BOARDING (Performing Arts Education Centers).

Chiasson appears on the Original Broadway Cast Albums of Rent (albums), THE SCARLET PIMPERNEL, and Baz Luhrmann's production of La bohème.

Chiasson conceived and co-produced his debut solo CD Slow Down. He has been a guest soloist with the Dallas Symphony Orchestra (DSO), the Philharmonia of the Nations, the Ann Arbor Symphony Orchestra (A2SO), and the West Michigan Symphony Orchestra, which allowed him to perform in his hometown theatre where he first took to the stage, The Frauenthal Center for the Performing Arts.

Chiasson co-wrote “Hands Holding Hands” with Nashville songwriter, Chris Roberts, famed for One Flew South, which premiered in BRAVE NEW WORLD, American Theatre Responds to 9/11, at The Town Hall (New York City) and received radio play across the U.S.A. Their song, “Sweet Mystery”, appears on LML Music In Good Company.

=== Education ===
Chiasson served as Theatre Director, Theatre Department Chair and Educator at Valley International Preparatory High School in Northridge, Los Angeles, California, from 2020 to 2024 where he taught three levels of acting, stage tech, and dramatic writing, in addition to running the theatre department which entailed producing and directing three productions each year. During his tenure at VIP High School, Chiasson produced and directed Ayn Rand's Night of January 16th, The Fantasticks, Phillip Dawkins' The Burn, 2023's Enough! Plays to End Gun Violence, and The Theory of Relativity (musical).

Chiasson left the classroom at the end of 2024 to work as Facility Use Manager for the Santa Monica-Malibu Unified School District where he oversaw 13 different sites in the cities of Santa Monica and Malibu, which include 4 proscenium theaters including the historic Barnum Hall in the heart of the City of Santa Monica on the campus of Santa Monica High School.

== Entertainment business ==
Chiasson is a former Moderator of Bobby Moresco's Actors Gym in Los Angeles, a weekly workshop for working professional writers and actors. Chiasson is a founder and ex officio board member of the Adirondack Theatre Festival, a non-profit theatre in Glens Falls, New York, established in 1995.

== Television appearances ==
As an original cast member of the Broadway production of Rent (musical): 50th Tony Awards in 1996, 51st Tony Awards in 1997, 62nd Tony Awards in 2008, The Rosie O'Donnell Show, The Tonight Show with Jay Leno, Late Show with David Letterman, 1996 Democratic National Convention, Good Morning America, 20/20, Rent: Filmed Live on Broadway in 2008, RENT: Live on Fox in 2019.

As an original cast member of The Scarlet Pimpernel (musical): 52nd Tony Awards in 1998, The Rosie O'Donnell Show, The 1998 NBA All-Star Game Half-Time Show.

As an original cast member of The Civil War (musical): 53rd Tony Awards and the Drama Desk Awards in 1999.

As an original cast member of Baz Luhrmann’s La Bohème: 57th Tony Awards in 2003.

In 2021, Chiasson appeared with his wife and two sons on the National Geographic (American TV channel) game show, Brain Games (2011 TV series), Brain Games on the Road, hosted by Chuck Nice.

== Discography ==
RENT - The Original Broadway Cast Recording, THE SCARLET PIMPERNEL - The Original Broadway Cast Recording, LA BOHÈME - The Original Broadway Cast Recording, FERMAT’S LAST TANGO - Original Cast Recording, SLOW DOWN – Slow Down Productions (CD Baby).
