= Jonathan Rabb =

American novelist

- Born: April 28, 1964 (age 62); Boston, Massachusetts, U.S.
- Education: Yale University; Columbia University (MA, MPhil)
- Occupations: Novelist; soloist; essayist; actor; writer
- Relatives: Theodore K. Rabb (father)

Jonathan Rabb (born April 28, 1964) is an American novelist, soloist, essayist, actor and writer.

== Early life and education ==
Born in Boston, Rabb grew up in Princeton, New Jersey, where his father, Theodore K. Rabb, taught history at the university. He studied political science at Yale University from 1982 to 1986 and earned an MA and MPhil in political theory from Columbia University.

While at Yale, Rabb sang with the Whiffenpoofs and performed in numerous productions, eventually finding himself in New York, where he continued to act and sing both Off-Broadway (Fermat's Last Tango). and at Carnegie Hall with the New York City Pops.

After leaving Columbia, Rabb began to write fiction. His first novel, The Overseer, was published in 1998. This was followed in 2001 by the historical thriller, The Book of Q. Rabb released the first novel of the Berlin trilogy, Rosa, in 2005, followed in 2009 by Shadow and Light and The Second Son in 2011.

Rabb has also published a string of short stories, essays, reviews and op-eds in Strand Magazine, The Oxford American, Opera News, The Huffington Post and in the series ‘I Wish I’d Been There.’ (Doubleday).

Rabb has taught at Columbia University, NYU, the 92nd Street Y and, in 2010, he joined the writing department faculty at the Savannah College of Art and Design.

== Literary work ==
Jonathan Rabb's debut thriller The Overseer was published in 1998 by Crown Publishers, a novel based on the discovery of a hidden medieval manuscript by an evil secret cabal.

The Book of Q was released in 2001, published by Crown Publishers. This book concerns the mysterious death and disappearance of Vatican priests and a secret Manichaean conspiracy.

The Berlin Trilogy is a set of historical mysteries: Rosa (2005), a detective story set in 1918 in war-ravaged Berlin, which introduces the characters of Detective Inspector Nikolai Hoffner and his assistant Hans Fichte of the Kriminalpolizei. Shadow and Light (2009) takes place in 1927, when an executive at the newly-famous Ufa film studios is found dead. The Second Son (2011) is set later, before the 1936 Olympics, and continues the story Chief Inspector Nikolai Hoffner's life as his family's fortunes come up against the Nazi regime.

== Awards and honours ==
Rosa was named in January Magazine’s Best Books of 2005.

Rabb's book Shadow and Light was named in 5 Best Berlin noirs, Wall Street Journal, 2012.
