= David M. Lutken =

American dramatist

David M. Lutken (born 1957) is an American musician, actor, playwright, and director best known for work related to Woody Guthrie.

== Life ==
Lutken was born and raised in Dallas, Texas, where he attended St. Mark's School of Texas. He graduated from Duke University in 1979 with a degree in Classical Studies. He studied in London at the Royal School of Church Music, the Royal College of Music, and the Webber Douglas Academy of Dramatic Art. In addition to developing various folk music/American history lessons for school children and young adults, he has created a touring show, Woody Sez: The Life and Music of Woody Guthrie. Woody Sez premiered at the Edinburgh Festival in 2007.

== Career ==
Lutken and his company have toured Woody Sez through the United States, Europe, the Middle East, and China. Lutken has won the Helen Hayes Award and the Jeff Award for Best Actor for portrayals of Woody Guthrie.

== Credits ==
Lutken's Broadway credits include Inherit the Wind, Ring of Fire, The Civil War and The Will Rogers Follies.
