= Fermat's Last Tango =

2000 off-Broadway musical

- CD cover of the official production
- Music: Joshua Rosenblum
- Lyrics: Joshua Rosenblum; Joanne Sydney Lessner
- Book: Joanne Sydney Lessner
- Setting: Princeton, 1990s
- Premiere: December 6, 2000: New York City
- Productions: York Theatre 2000; Teatro da Trindade 2004

Fermat's Last Tango is a 2000 off-Broadway musical about the proof of Fermat's Last Theorem, written by husband and wife Joshua Rosenblum (music, lyrics) and Joanne Sydney Lessner (book, lyrics). The musical presents a fictionalized version of the real life story of Andrew Wiles, and has been praised for the accuracy of the mathematical content. The original production at the York Theatre received mixed reviews, but the musical was well received by mathematical audiences. A video of the original production has been distributed by the Clay Mathematics Institute and shown at several mathematical conferences and similar occasions. The musical has also been translated into Portuguese.

== Synopsis ==
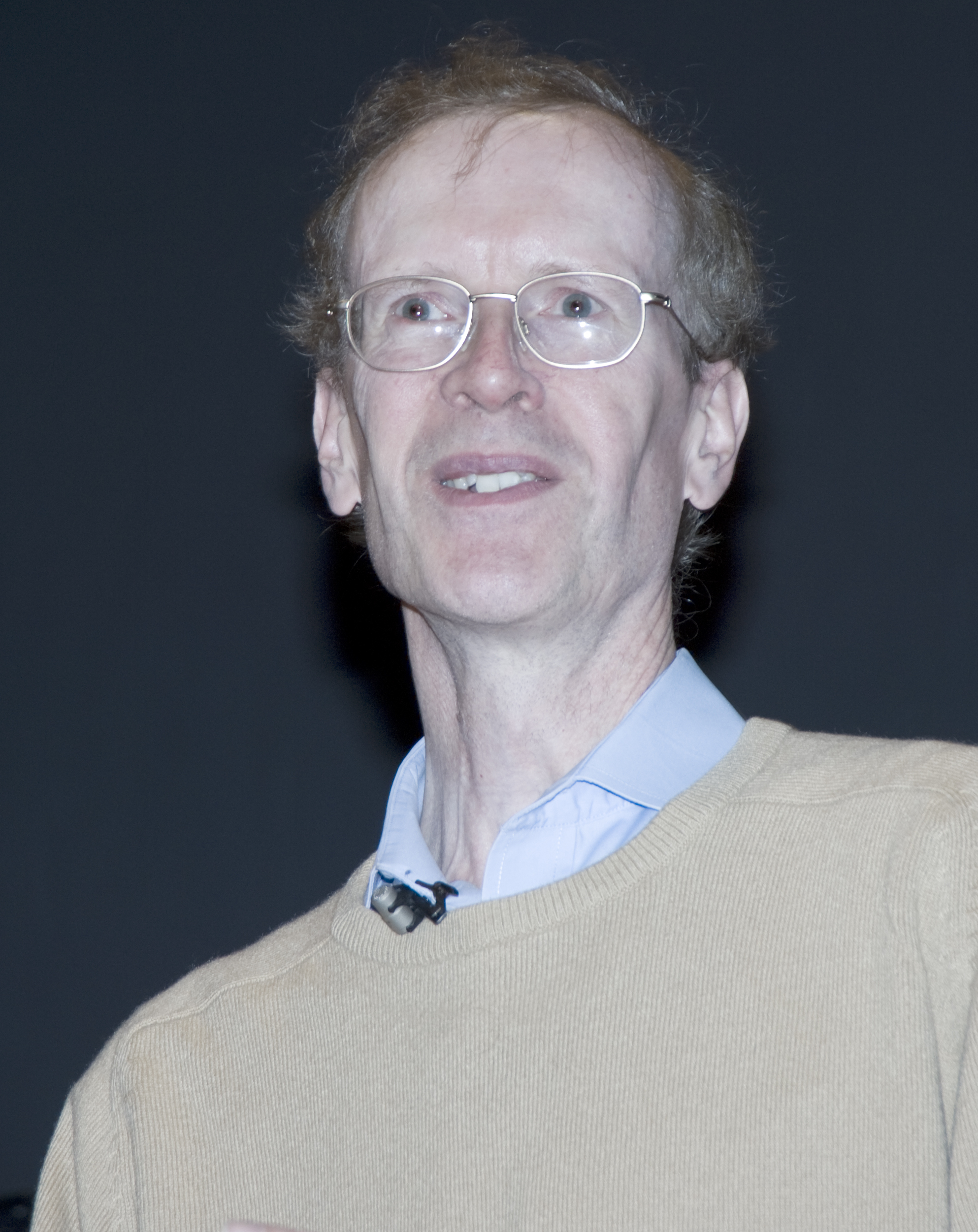
Andrew Wiles in 2005

The plot is based on the story of the proof of Fermat's Last Theorem by Andrew Wiles, whose name is changed to "Daniel Keane" in the musical. After seven years of isolation in his attic, Keane believes he has found a proof of the theorem. The musical starts with a press conference, where Keane explains his proof to reporters and promises to return to normal life with his wife Anna and his family. After promising to Anna that he is now "done with Fermat", Keane is surprised in his study by none other than Fermat himself. Keane asks Fermat for the secret of his proof but is refused. Instead, Fermat introduces him to the "Aftermath", a "heavenly purgatory" where he meets the famous mathematicians Euclid, Pythagoras, Newton, and Gauss. They inform him that his proof contains a "big fat hole". In a second press conference, Keane is questioned by reporters about a flaw in the proof. Anna wishes for a corrected proof for her birthday. Fermat mocks Keane, and the other mathematicians inform him that "mathematics is a young man's game". Keane returns to his attic to try to fix his proof, while his "math widow" wife is frustrated. Fermat continues to taunt Keane, but he is invisible and inaudible to Anna, and the three dance a "bizarre tango à trois" while Anna is confused by Keane talking to Fermat. The other mathematicians from the Aftermath, after noticing that they can't keep up with the mathematics of the past century, decide to grant admission to Keane even if he is unable to prove the theorem. As Keane finally gives up and declares his attempts a failure, Anna suggests that "within your failure lie the seeds of your success", repeating a line earlier spoken by the mathematicians. This quickly leads to Keane realising how to close the gap in the argument, and the musical ends with another press conference, and Fermat congratulates Keane for his proof.

== Concept and writing ==
Rosenblum and Lessner started working on Fermat's Last Tango in December 1996, after Rosenblum had read a review of Amir Aczel's book Fermat's Last Theorem. Originally planned as an opera, it turned into a musical during the writing process, but operatic elements remained. The original working title had been Proof, but was later changed because of the successful 2000 play Proof. While written in a whimsical tone and using nerdy jokes, the lyrics contain sophisticated mathematical content and mention the Shimura-Taniyama conjecture. In the words of mathematician Arthur Jaffe, "the characters think about mathematics just the way a real mathematician would". Keane's mistake in his proof is an incorrect assumption about Galois representations, just as in the original proof attempt by Andrew Wiles. The number theorist Fernando Q. Gouvêa is credited as mathematics consultant for the musical; writer Lessner was not in contact with Wiles while the musical was created.

Almost the entire text is performed in song, with the exception of the prologue. The music contains elements of operetta, blues, pop, and tango. According to reviewer Simon Saltzman, the use of popular musical styles helps to make the show accessible despite its esoteric subject matter.

== Original production ==
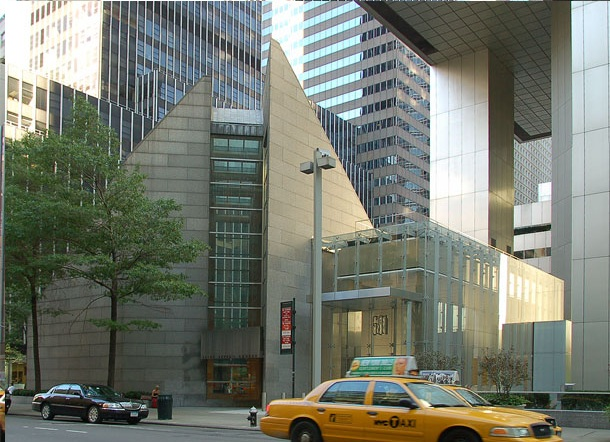
St Peter's Lutheran Church, Manhattan

The original production by the York Theatre ran from November 21 to December 31, 2000 at the Theater at St. Peter's Lutheran Church, directed by Mel Marvin, with sets designed by James Morgan.

Cast:

- Chris Thompson as Daniel Keane (baritone)
- Jonathan Rabb as Pierre de Fermat (tenor)
- Edwardyne Cowan as Anna Keane (mezzo-soprano)
- Christianne Tisdale as Euclid and reporter 1 (soprano)
- Carrie Wilshusen as Sir Isaac Newton and reporter 2 (mezzo-soprano)
- Gilles Chiasson as Carl Friedrich Gauss and reporter 3
- Mitchell Kantor as Pythagoras and reporter 4 (bass)

== Musical numbers ==
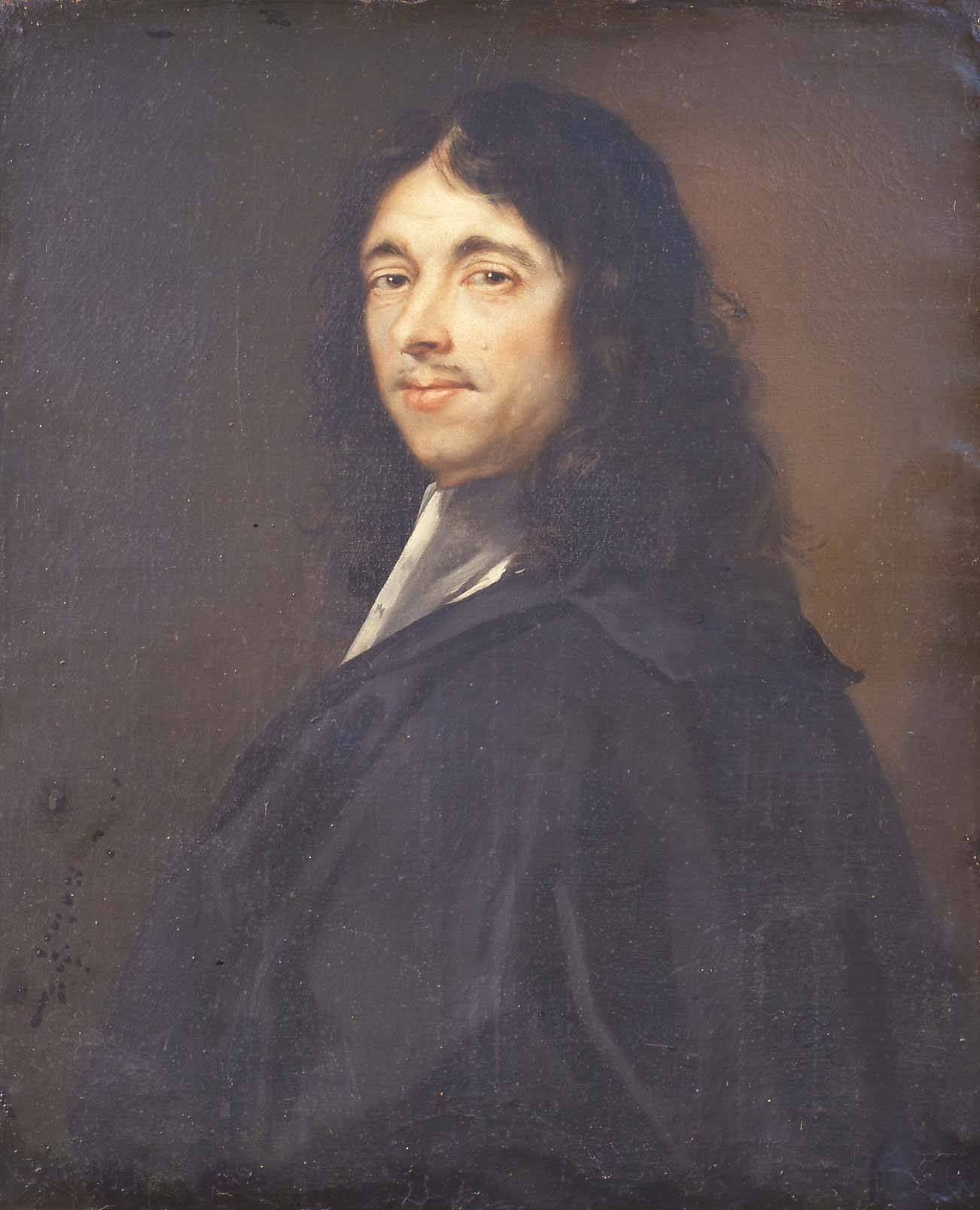
Pierre de Fermat, 17th century painting by Rolland Lefebvre

The numbers are listed as in the CD production's liner notes.

- Prologue – Reporter 4, Fermat
- Press Conference I – Reporters, Keane
- You're a Hero Now – Anna, Keane
- The Beauty of Numbers – Keane
- Tell Me Your Secret – Keane, Fermat
- The Aftermath – Mathematicians, Fermat, Keane
- I Dreamed – Keane, Anna
- Press Conference II – Reporters, Keane, Anna
- My Name – Fermat
- All I Want for My Birthday – Anna
- Game Show, Part I – Fermat, Keane
- Young Man's Game – Fermat, Mathematicians
- Game Show, Part II – Fermat, Keane, Mathematicians
- Math Widow – Anna
- I'll Always Be There (Fermat's Last Tango) – Fermat, Keane, Anna
- Relay Race – Mathematicians
- I'm Stumbling – Keane
- Oh, It's You – Keane, Pythagoras
- The Beauty of Numbers (reprise) – Anna, Keane
- Press Conference III – Reporters, Keane, Fermat

== Other performances ==
The musical was translated into Portuguese by César Viana as O Último Tango de Fermat and was played in Portuguese university towns in 2003 and at the Teatro da Trindade in 2004. Students at Madison East High School performed an abridged version in 2005 and 2006, including at a statewide meeting of the Mathematical Association of America. In March 2023, the musical was performed at the University of Oxford in one of the Mathematical Institute's lecture halls.

== Reception ==
Reviews for Fermat's Last Tango during its theatrical run were mixed. Wilburn Hampton's review in The New York Times, while noticing the catchy tunes and lyrics, found fault with Daniel Keane not "becom[ing] a real character". Elyse Sommer's review in CurtainUp was more positive, finding praise for both writing and the performances of Rabb and Thompson. Writing in the "Periodica" section of TotalTheater, reviewer Simon Saltzman praised Rabb and called the titular tango the highlight of the show.

The mathematical reception has been more generally positive, with audiences reactions to screenings of the film version ranging from "mildly amused to enthusiastic." Mathematician Robert Osserman, while acknowledging the musical as unique to the point of making comparisons difficult, found it fun and moving and praised the actors and the music. He especially pointed out the mathematical accuracy, but mildly complained about stereotyping of mathematicians and the differences between the true story of Andrew Wiles and the fictional story of Daniel Keane: Unlike Keane, Wiles did not withdraw to his attic for seven years and did not solve the complete Shimura-Taniyama conjecture. Richard Taylor's role in the proof is also omitted in the fictionalized version. Michele Emmer's review in the Mathematical Intelligencer was positive, stating "the gamble of trying to produce an entertaining and mathematically correct musical turned out a success." In their book Math Goes to the Movies, mathematicians Burkard Polster and Marty Ross were enthusiastic about Fermat's Last Tango, calling it "terrific fun" and a "must-see". In her book Science on Stage From Doctor Faustus to Copenhagen, literary scholar Kirsten Shepherd-Barr noted the musical's "successful integration of a surprising amount of 'real' mathematics with a charming and witty score."

In his book Dr. Riemann's Zeros: The Search for the $1 Million Solution to the Greatest Problem in Mathematics, journalist Karl Sabbagh wrote about seeing a performance of Fermat's Last Tango after meeting Andrew Wiles at Princeton. He described the Daniel Keane in the musical as "an accurate portrayal of Wiles" and stated "The writers of this musical had managed to capture the essence of the mathematical enterprise and to see that the human drama of Wiles's struggle with Fermat's Last Theorem embodied as much passion, frustration and triumph as is found in the plot of any conventional film or play." Andrew Wiles himself saw the musical in December 2000, with his family. In an interview, he later stated that he "really liked the portrayal of the personal part of the story - the whole idea of the threesome at the tango was beautifully done" and that he felt "it had been very intelligently written".

== Recordings ==
On the initiative of Clay Mathematics Institute president Arthur Jaffe, a high quality live performance video was made, directed by David Stern. It was first shown to an audience of four hundred people in July 2001 in Berkeley, and later sold at cost by the Clay Mathematics Institute in both VHS and DVD editions. A pamphlet about the mathematics and the mathematicians as well as the actors in the musical was included. The film was shown at various mathematical conferences.

A recording made on December 18, 2000, was distributed as a CD version by Original Cast Records. It was positively reviewed by Matthew Murray, who especially praised Edwardyne Cowan's performance as Anna Keane.
