= Arthur Porges =

American writer

Arthur Porges (/ˈpɔːrdʒɪs/; 20 August 1915 – 12 May 2006) was an American writer of numerous short stories, most notably during the 1950s and 1960s, though he continued to write and publish stories until his death.

== Life ==
Porges was born in Chicago, Illinois, on August 20, 1915. After completing his B.A. and master's degrees in mathematics, he was drafted into the army for World War II and served as an instructor in California.

After the war, he taught mathematics at college before retiring to write.

== Family background ==
Porges's father, Israel Podgursky, was born in 1885 in the Russian Empire near the eastern border of Poland. He had American associations through his two brothers—Mortimer, a lawyer in Chicago, and Dave, who worked for the Chicago Board of Education—and two sisters, Lilian and Rose, neither of whom married. Mortimer had two daughters, Lois and June. On migrating to the U.S. he changed his name to James Porges, with the new surname adopted from that of a relative, Leo Porges, who had a business in Chicago. Of this, Arthur wrote later, "I've never known if he ... picked the name out of the air, ... or had some ties to the Jewish Porges network." James Porges worked at the Bell Telephone Company in Chicago, and had four sons: Leonard, Irwin, Arthur, and Walter. Porges observed, "None had children, although all but me married rather late in life."

Porges's mother was Clara Kurzin, who died when he was nine years old. Porges's brother Irwin Porges (1909–1998) was a biographer of the American author Edgar Rice Burroughs (The Man Who Created Tarzan). Irwin also studied piano and music arranging at a music conservatory, became a professional pianist with dance orchestras, and composed popular songs.

== Career ==
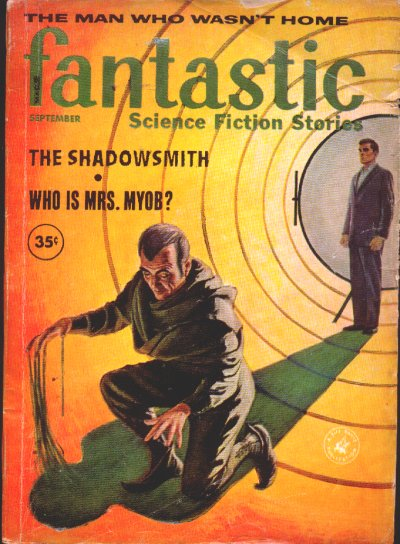
Porges's "The Shadowsmith" was the cover story for the September 1960 issue of Fantastic

As an author, Arthur Porges was most prolific during the mid-twentieth century, publishing most frequently in mystery magazines. He wrote many essays and non-fiction articles. Many of Porges's fictional heroes do not survive in their stories. This element adds tension—for example, in his first published story, "The Rats" (1950), mutated rats eventually overcome a lone survivor in a post-holocaust world. The publication of this story in The Magazine of Fantasy and Science Fiction began the working relationship between Porges and the editor Anthony Boucher.

A noted author himself, Boucher helped Porges get his work published, and during the 1950s influenced his writing style a great deal. Among Porges's short stories of this period was "The Ruum" (1953). Perhaps his best-known story, "The Ruum" deals with a human who is chased by an indestructible alien machine designed to capture specimens and keep them in suspended animation. Stories of the 1960s include "The Arrogant Vampire" (1961), "One Bad Habit" (1961), and "The Fanatic" (1964). His brother Irwin collaborated with him on one story, "A Touch of Sun" (1959). Porges also wrote at times under pseudonyms such as Peter Arthur, Pat Rogers, Maxwell Trent, Abel Jacobi, and Derek Page. He wrote in several genres, with his science fiction/fantasy and mystery stories being most celebrated. His output of short stories numbers in the hundreds.

A collection of his short stories, The Mirror and Other Strange Reflections (ISBN 1-55310-044-1), was published in 2002 by Ash-Tree Press.

== Influences ==
Porges read the works of such authors as Sir Arthur Conan Doyle, Saki, O. Henry, Thomas Henry Huxley, Samuel Johnson, G. K. Chesterton, Rudyard Kipling, Jack London, H. G. Wells, Isaac Asimov, Robert Louis Stevenson, Charles Dickens and Edgar Wallace.

== Adaptations ==
The seventh episode, produced in 1982, of the Soviet science fiction TV series This Fantastic World was based on Porges' story "Priceless Possession" and Oleg Lukyanov's story "Uncertainty Principle".

== Bibliography ==
=== Selected short stories ===
- "The Rats", Man's World (February 1951)
- "The Fly", Fantasy & Science Fiction (September 1952)
- "Mop-Up", Fantasy & Science Fiction (July 1953)
- "The Ruum", Fantasy & Science Fiction (October 1953)
- "The Liberator", Fantasy & Science Fiction (December 1953)
- "The Devil and Simon Flagg" Fantasy & Science Fiction (August 1954)
- "Dead Drunk" (1959)
- "Circle in the Dust" (1960)
- "A Specimen for the Queen" (1960)
- "The Shadowsmith", Fantastic (September 1960)
- "Solomon's Demon" (1961)
- "The Rescuer" (1962)
- "The Missing Bow" (1963)
- "The Fanatic" (1964)
- "Priceless Possession" (1966)
- "Blood Will Tell" (1966)
- "The Mirror" (1966)
- "Swan Song", Adam's Best Fiction, ed. Thomas H. Schulz (1966)

=== Collections ===
- Three Parodies and a Pastiche (1988)
- The Mirror and Other Strange Reflections (2002)
- The Calabash of Coral Island and Other Early Stories (2008)
- The Miracle of the Bread and Other Stories (2008)
- Spring, 1836: Selected Poems (2008)

== See also ==
- Fermat's Last Theorem in fiction
