= The Last Theorem =

2008 novel by Arthur C. Clarke and Frederik Pohl

- First UK edition cover
- Authors: Arthur C. Clarke; Frederik Pohl
- Cover artist: Tim Brown
- Language: English
- Genre: Science fiction
- Publisher: HarperVoyager (UK); Del Rey (US)
- Publication date: July 2008 (UK); August 2008 (US)
- Media type: Print (hardback)
- Pages: 311 (hardcover)
- ISBN: 978-0-00-728998-1

The Last Theorem is a 2008 science fiction novel by Arthur C. Clarke and Frederik Pohl. It was first published in the United Kingdom by HarperVoyager in July 2008, and in the United States by Del Rey Books in August 2008. The book is about a young Sri Lankan mathematician who finds a short proof of Fermat's Last Theorem, while an alien invasion of Earth is in progress.

The novel began as Clarke's, but when ill health and a psychological (or possibly neurological) form of writer's block prevented him from making progress, he handed over his notes and the incomplete manuscript to Pohl, who, in close consultation with Clarke, completed the novel. Clarke reviewed the final manuscript in early March 2008, just days before he died.

In general The Last Theorem was not well received by critics. Entertainment Weekly in their review of the novel said that "uneven pacing and tone mar an intriguing cautionary tale". The Los Angeles Times wondered how stable the manuscript was when it was published, adding that it does nothing to "burnish the legacy of either of its authors". The San Francisco Chronicle, however, described the novel as a "fitting valedictory for Clarke, ... and a reminder of Pohl's great relevance to a genre he has championed for more than 70 years".

== Background ==
Science fiction Grand Masters Arthur C. Clarke and Frederik Pohl collaborated for the first time on The Last Theorem. The novel initially was Clarke's, and he began working on it in early 2004. But in 2006, at the age of 88, ill health brought on by complications from post-polio syndrome, and writer's block, impeded his progress, and he asked Pohl for help. Pohl explained: "Arthur said to me that he woke up one morning and didn't know how to write any of the books he had contracted. The stories had just gone out of his head." Clarke gave Pohl a 40–50 page manuscript plus roughly 50 pages of notes, and over the next two years, Pohl wrote the book. Pohl said that "Everything in the novel is something he either suggested or wrote or I discussed with him." Some of Clarke's notes were so obscure that even Clarke himself could not understand them. Pohl, only two years younger than Clarke, had health problems of his own: he could no longer type and wrote the book out in longhand, leaving it up to his wife to translate his "indecipherable scribbles". Clarke reviewed and approved the final manuscript of The Last Theorem in early March 2008, just days before he died. Pohl died five years later in September 2013.

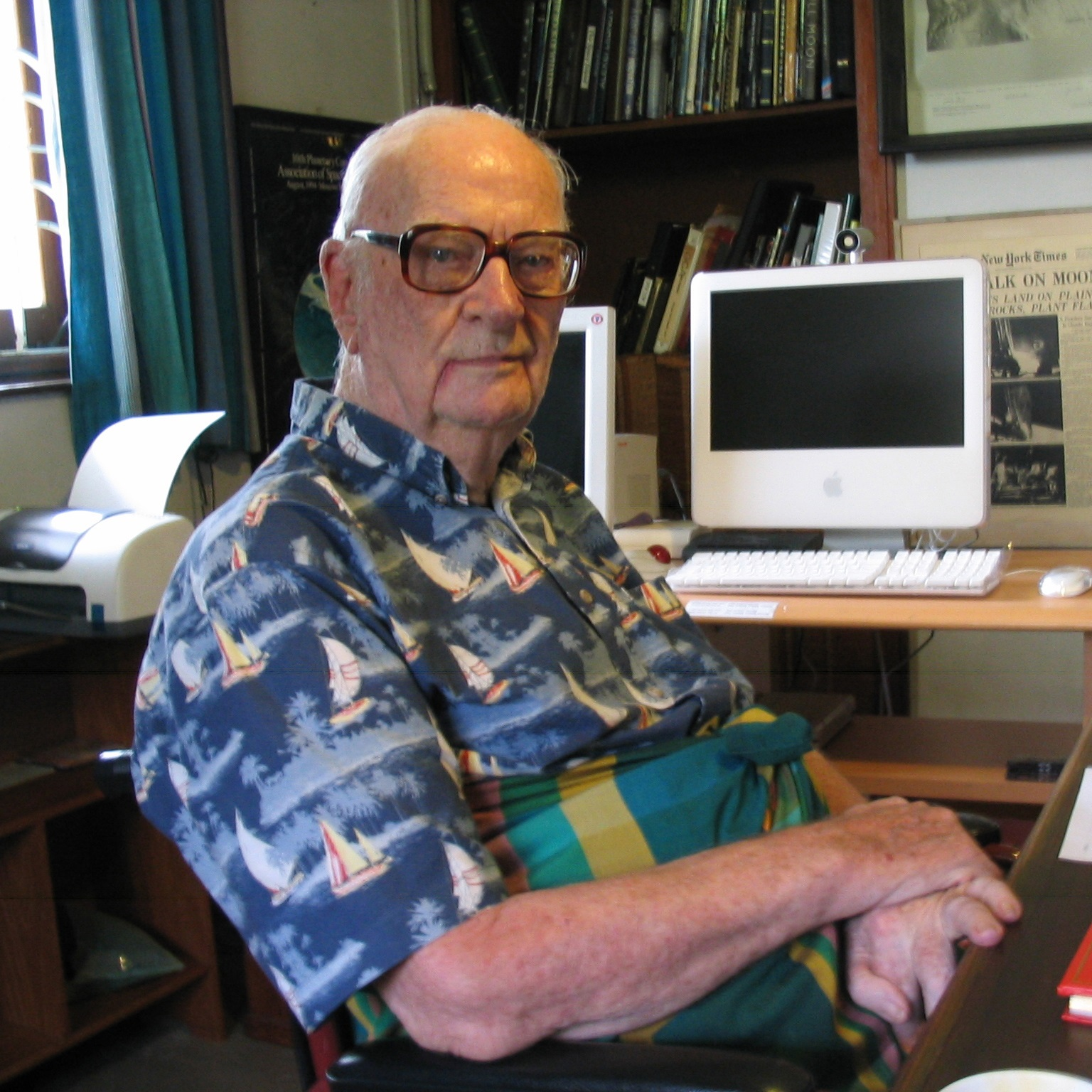
Arthur C. Clarke at his home in Colombo, Sri Lanka, March 2005

Some of the concepts that appear in The Last Theorem originally appeared in Clarke's earlier works. The space elevator that is built in Sri Lanka originally featured in The Fountains of Paradise (1979) where it was also built in Sri Lanka (then Ceylon). Because the elevator will work only on or near the equator, Clarke "moved" Ceylon south to the equator in The Fountains of Paradise, and the equator north to Sri Lanka in The Last Theorem. The solar powered space yacht race was first featured in a short story of Clarke's, "The Wind from the Sun" (1964), and the concept of a "mysterious Elder Race" deciding our fate, in this case the Grand Galactics, has appeared in several of Clarke's previous novels, including Childhood's End (1953) and the Space Odyssey Series (1968–1997). Some of Pohl's earlier themes also appear here, including his human-machine hybrid which featured in Man Plus (1976).

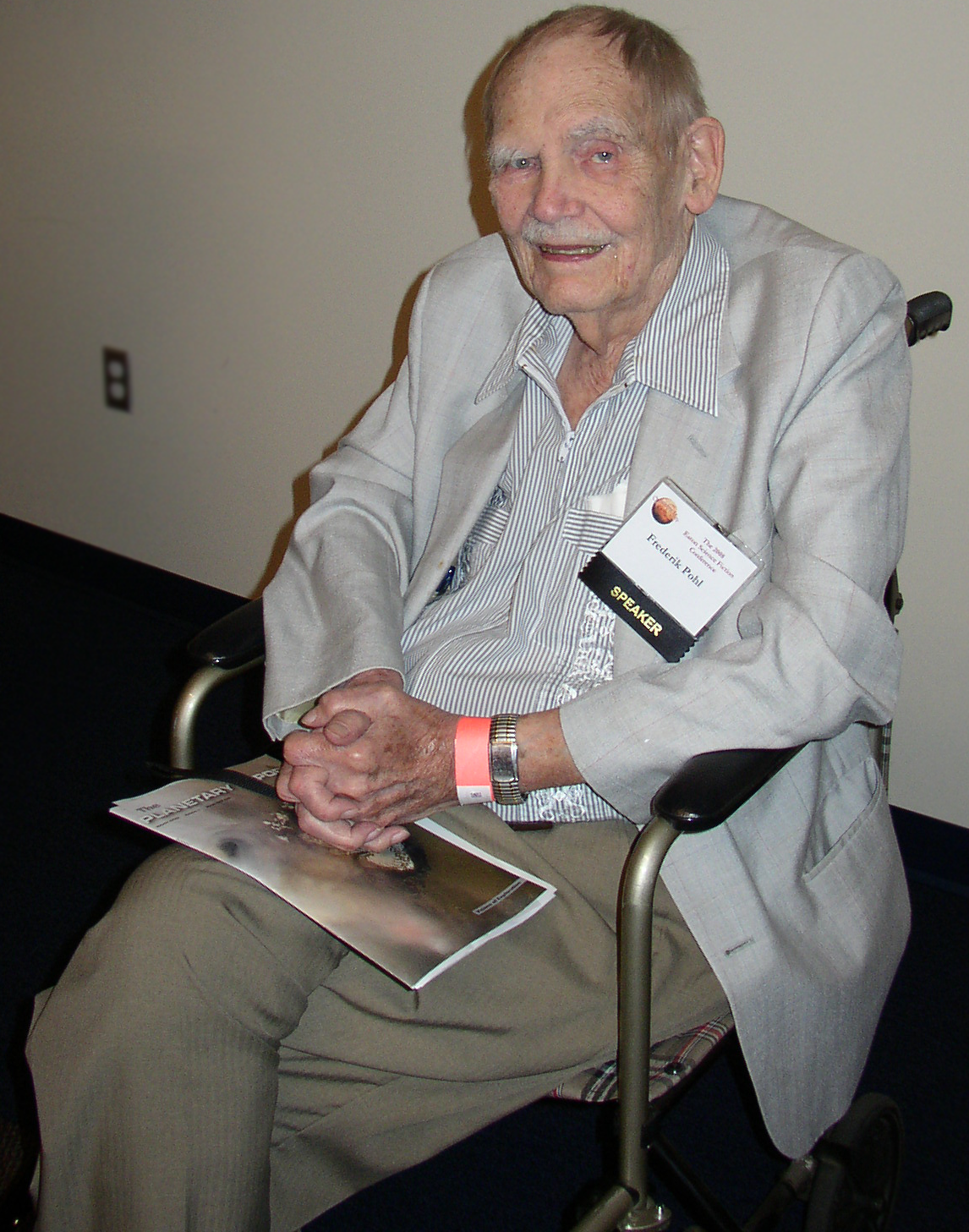
Frederik Pohl at the J. Lloyd Eaton Science Fiction Conference, May 2008

Clarke wrote over 30 science fiction novels and over 100 works of short fiction, winning both the Hugo and Nebula Awards several times. He moved to Sri Lanka (then Ceylon) in 1956 and remained there for the rest of his life. One of his greatest wishes was for peace in Sri Lanka. The Last Theorem is set in his adopted country, and Pohl said that tensions between the Sinhalese Sri Lankan government and the Tamil liberation army (the Tamil Tigers) were "major inspirations for the novel".

Pohl's writing career spans 70 years, and includes over 50 science fiction novels and numerous short stories. He also won both the Hugo and Nebula Awards several times. One of Pohl's fascinations has been mathematics, in particular number theory. He would often spend his spare time "playing" with prime numbers, and even tried to write a formula for generating primes. But he did invent several mathematical parlour tricks, some of which are featured in The Last Theorem.

== Plot summary ==
The Last Theorem is set in Sri Lanka in the early- to mid-21st century and follows the life of a mathematician, Ranjit Subramanian. While studying at Colombo University, he becomes obsessed with Fermat's Last Theorem, a conjecture made by Pierre de Fermat in 1637, for which he claimed to have conceived a proof that he never wrote down. The proof eluded mathematicians across the world for over 350 years, until in 1995 British mathematician Andrew Wiles published a 100-page proof of the theorem. But not everyone was "satisfied" with Wiles's proof because it used twentieth century mathematical techniques not available in Fermat's time.

In the novel's back-story, extraterrestrial sapients, the "Grand Galactics", are alarmed when they detect the photon shock waves from nuclear bomb detonations on Earth. The Grand Galactics monitor and control the destinies of a number of high-performance sapient races and order one of these races, the "Nine Limbeds", to send "cease and desist" messages to Earth. When these messages have no effect, the Grand Galactics order another race, the "One Point Fives", to launch an armada to Earth to exterminate the undesirable species.

Back on Earth, regional conflicts escalate and the United Nations struggles to contain them. In Sri Lanka, Ranjit unwittingly boards a cruise ship that is hijacked by pirates. When unknown security forces free the ship, Ranjit is arrested on suspicion of terrorism. For six months he is interrogated and tortured, but he cannot supply the information his captors want so he is locked up and "forgotten" for a further 18 months. During this period of incarceration, Ranjit dwells on Fermat's Last Theorem and, after several months, solves it with a three-page proof. Later Ranjit is rescued by a friend from university, Gamini Bandara, who will not reveal whom he is working for or where Ranjit was held captive.

Ranjit submits his proof for publication and achieves worldwide fame. He marries Myra de Soyza, an artificial intelligence specialist, and embarks on a speaking tour of the world. In the United States, he is briefly recruited by the CIA to work on cryptography. Gamini later reveals that he is working for Pax per Fidem (Peace through Transparency), an undercover United Nations organization established to bring about world peace. To achieve this end, Pax per Fidem has developed "Silent Thunder", a non-lethal EMP nuclear superweapon that renders all electrical equipment in its path inoperable. Silent Thunder is deployed in North Korea and later in South America, and regional conflicts subside. Gamini invites Ranjit to join Pax per Fidem, but the authoritarian nature of the organisation and its "new world order" worry Ranjit and Myra, and Ranjit turns down the offer. He does, however, accept a position on the advisory board of an international consortium building a space elevator in Sri Lanka, chosen because of its location on the equator. (Note: Sri Lanka is not on the equator, but to enable the construction of the space elevator there, Arthur C. Clarke "moved" the equator several hundred kilometers north. See the "Background" section above.)

As the One Point Five fleet enters the Solar System, the Nine Limbeds orbit and observe Earth in cigar-shaped craft, sparking numerous UFO sightings. A Grand Galactic member, who happens to be passing by, stops to observe the effects of Silent Thunder and returns to the Grand Galactic collective, who immediately suspend the One Point Fives's destruct orders pending further investigation.

The space elevator is completed and, for the first time, people and materials can be lifted into Earth orbit without the need of rockets. Natasha, Ranjit and Myra's daughter, competes in the first solar-powered space yacht race from Earth- to Moon-orbit. But soon after the start of the race, Natasha's yacht malfunctions and she is abducted by the Nine Limbeds, who use a projection of her to interrogate prominent people on Earth, including Ranjit and Gamini, about Silent Thunder. Satisfied that Earth has "reformed", they return Natasha and broadcast a message to Earth in which they announce that the Grand Galactics have decided not to sterilize Earth, and that the One Point Fives, with their Machine Stored navigators, cannot return home and will land and occupy unused areas of Earth.

The One Point Fives land in the desolate Qattara Depression in the Libyan Desert, which they find quite habitable compared to their ruined homeworld. The Americans send B-52 bombers to attack the One Point Fives' base, but the aliens electronically disable the aircraft, causing them to crash short of their target. When the US President demands reparations, the One Point Fives provide gold distilled from seawater by way of compensation. With the Grand Galactics absent, the aliens make decisions for themselves: the One Point Fives provide Earth with new forms of power and the Machine Stored reveal mind uploading technology. When Myra dies in a scuba diving accident, her mind is uploaded into cyberspace, with Ranjit joining her later.

After 13,000 years, the Grand Galactics finally return to Earth and are astounded to see how fast the planet has developed. They had always interfered with the evolution of sentient species they had discovered, believing they could not be trusted to evolve on their own. Impressed with Earth's progress, the Grand Galactic relieve themselves of the burden of watching over intelligent life and hand the task over to Earth.

== Characters ==
=== Sri Lankans ===
These characters come from three of Sri Lanka's ethnic groups: the Sinhalese, the Tamils and the Portuguese Burghers.

- Ranjit Subramanian (Tamil) – a mathematical prodigy and son of a Hindu priest; he achieves worldwide fame after proving Fermat's Last Theorem without recourse to methods not available to Fermat in his day
- Myra Subramanian (née de Soyza) (Burgher) – an artificial intelligence and prosthetic specialist and wife of Ranjit
- Natasha de Soyza Subramanian – solar wind yacht race contestant and daughter of Ranjit and Myra
- Gamini Bandara (Sinhalese) – a United Nations undercover operative and freshman friend of Ranjit's at Colombo University

=== Aliens ===
- Grand Galactics – sentient entities with the ability to subdivide themself into fragments, each capable of appearing "instantaneously" anywhere in the galaxy; monitor other life and follow the principle of "Protect the harmless. Quarantine the dangerous. Destroy the malevolent – after storing a backup in a secure location".
- Grand Galactic client (subordinate) races:
  - One Point Fives – a diminutive cat-sized race who all but destroyed their world 20 light-years from Earth and now wear shields and prostheses to protect themselves from their toxic environment, increasing their body size 1.5 times; they are the Grand Galactics's "hit men" used to destroy recalcitrant planets
  - Nine Limbeds – a nine-limbed race with good language skills; used by the Grand Galactics to communicate with other races
  - Machine Stored – a "demonic" looking race whose neglect of their planet left it uninhabitable, forcing them to upload themselves into the memory of machines; used by the Grand Galactics as ship navigators and to "backup" other races

== Reception and analysis ==
In spite of the publicity The Last Theorem received, that it was Clarke's "last novel", and that it was written by two science fiction Grand Masters, it was generally not well received by critics.

Entertainment Weekly in their review said that "uneven pacing and tone mar an intriguing cautionary tale. This collaboration, completed before Clarke's death last March, would've made a better solo project for either author." The Washington Post said that "The Last Theorem reads like a dog-eared album of favorite themes from yesteryear", referring to Clarke and Pohl topics from the authors' earlier works. Thomas M. Wagner at SF Reviews wrote that "The Last Theorem is a book I really resent not liking, because there's so much about it that deserves to be liked." He said that the first two-thirds is "so good ... it almost, but doesn't quite, make up for the nonsense that overtakes the whole affair at the climax". Wagner felt that the meeting of "two disparate storytelling sensibilities" was "far less harmonious and compatible" than Clarke and Pohl may have imagined. Wagner summed up by saying that "The Last Theorem is not simply an uneven novel. It's a deeply disjointed one, a book that introduces a host of wonderful ideas and sympathetic, believable characters, only to decide it doesn't trust them to carry off the story in the end, ultimately falling back – disastrously – on dated and dubious formula."

Sheila Merritt at SciFi Dimensions said that while it should have been "a fine tribute and a fitting farewell to this master of science fiction", it turned out to be an "easy book to put down". She said that the plot "meanders in fits and starts" and that the book is too long for the story it tells. Ed Park of the Los Angeles Times enjoyed the first third of the book, but said that for the rest, its "winning and winking self-consciousness evaporates". He wondered how stable the manuscript was when it was published, and added that it does nothing to "burnish the legacy of either of its authors".

A common criticism amongst many reviewers was that, in spite of the book's title, no connection is made between Fermat's Last Theorem and the alien invasion. Alex Kasman at Mathematical Fiction complained about errors in some of the authors' descriptions of the mathematical problems, and in particular their unfair treatment of Wiles's proof of Fermat's Last Theorem. Some reviewers felt that the characters had not been developed sufficiently. Michael Sims of The Washington Post said that "these characters are so thin you can see through them". The aliens are depicted as cartoon-like figures, and Ranjit does not appear to be affected by his lengthy incarceration, interrogation and torture. Some critics also felt that the book ended "somewhat precipitously", and that, after the aliens arrived, the crisis was resolved too quickly, giving the impression "that there was at least a good, long chapter missing".

Not all reviews, however, were negative. Nader Elhefnawy at Strange Horizons described the book as "an interesting experiment". He said that Pohl deserves the credit for "capturing Clarke's voice", and that Clarke also deserves credit for doing something completely different. While he would not recommend the book to readers new to Clarke's work, Elhefnawy said that fans would not regret reading the book. Mark Yon at SFF World said that, while this is not one of Clarke's best works, "it is still very good". He said that, even though it is a collaboration, the book is still recognisably Clarke, "with the same humour, the same enthusiasm, the great flashes of inspiration, the big ideas and the same curious positivism that underlines most of Sir Arthur’s work. ... There is a joy throughout here: a joy of learning, of opening up new opportunities and experiences, and a love of mathematics and science." Michael Berry at the San Francisco Chronicle said that the novel does a "stellar job of conveying some of the intellectual fun that can be had by manipulating math". He said that Sri Lanka, Clarke's home for most of his life, is brought "vividly to life", and that, despite some minor flaws, The Last Theorem is a "fitting valedictory for Clarke, one of science fiction's most acclaimed authors, and a reminder of Pohl's great relevance to a genre he has championed for more than 70 years".

== See also ==
- Fermat's Last Theorem in fiction
- Space elevators in fiction

== Work cited ==
- Clarke, Arthur C.; Pohl, Frederik C. (2009) [2008]. The Last Theorem. London: Harper Voyager. ISBN 978-0-00-729002-4.
