= The Ruum =

- Short story by Arthur Porges
- Country: United States
- Language: English
- Genre: Science fiction

Publication
- Published in: The Magazine of Fantasy and Science Fiction
- Publisher: Fantasy House, Inc.
- Media type: Magazine
- Publication date: October 1953

"The Ruum" is a 1953 science fiction short story by American writer Arthur Porges.

== Plot summary ==
An indestructible robot—a "Type H-9 Ruum"—is accidentally left behind on earth during the age of the dinosaurs by visiting aliens, and not recovered because their ship is destroyed in a battle. The ruum's work is to collect every species of animal within a 30-mile radius weighing 160 pounds plus or minus 15, and to preserve them in a state of suspended animation for later retrieval.

Millions of years later Jim Irwin, a uranium prospector in the Canadian Rocky Mountains, encounters the ruum's specimens, animals which include modern and prehistoric mammals and a small Stegosaurus. He notices the animals are all of a uniform size and are not dead, despite some being millions of years old. Rather, they are paralyzed, and apparently fully conscious, in a living death. The still-functioning ruum appears, extending gripping hooks and a probe that drips green liquid. Irwin realizes the alien device intends to paralyze him. Shooting it with a rifle does not damage it, and Irwin flees as it pursues him at a steady five miles per hour. It is noted that Irwin weighs 149 pounds.

Fit and military-trained, Irwin attempts to evade and destroy the ruum. First he hides above his trail and drops a boulder on it, but this fails to damage it. Then he climbs a sheer cliff, thinking the ruum cannot climb; but the ruum extends a climbing claw to the top of the cliff and begins to pull itself up. He tries to dislodge the claw with a stick, and is given a nasty electric shock. He finally dislodges the claw by shooting it, but the ruum is unharmed by the fall and responds by extending three claws at a time — more than Irwin can shoot. Having had no time for food or sleep, Irwin eventually circles back to his camp and sets a trap with dynamite. Taking advantage of the ruum's distraction by a grizzly bear, which it kills, he detonates the dynamite with a shot from his pistol.

Dazed by the explosion, exhausted and defenseless, he sees the ruum still unharmed and approaching. But, to his surprise, it lifts him up, then puts him down and leaves. His colleague Walt Leonard arrives by seaplane and rescues him. Safely in the plane, they make plans to bring a helicopter and collect some of the ruum's specimens in its absence to sell to scientists. Leonard comments on Irwin's haggard appearance, guessing that he must have lost ten pounds during the chase.

== Sequel ==
A sequel to "The Ruum," titled "A Specimen for the Queen," appeared in the May 1960 edition of The Magazine of Fantasy and Science Fiction.

Following the events of the original story, it is mentioned in passing that the ruum succeeds in paralyzing a human (implied to be an ironic self-insert of Porges himself). Subsequently, a spacecraft belonging to a race of militant ant-people arrives on Earth. Mistaking the ruum for an item of human technology, they take it aboard, intending to present it to their Queen as an amusing novelty. Back on their homeworld, the giant Queen is engaged in laying thousands of eggs that will hatch into soldier ants, the vanguard of an army that will conquer the galaxy. However, once the ant spaceship is on course for its home planet, the ruum paralyzes the captain in the control room and kills any other ants who attempt to approach. With no one at the controls, the ship crashes into the planet at high velocity and is vaporized. The indestructible ruum survives, although the impact has affected its programming, increasing the weight of specimens it is intended to paralyze. Unfortunately for the ants, their Queen's weight now falls comfortably within this range, and the Ruum soon detects her and sets off in her direction.

== Reprints ==
"The Ruum" was selected by David Drake for his 1988 anthology Things Hunting Men, where he commented that this was one of Porges' seventy-some "meticulously crafted stories" where "sometimes the problem the protagonist faces really is insoluble." But, here, Jim Irwin never gives up.

Many other reprints are listed at the ISFDB.
