= Ron Bohmer =

American actor and singer

- Ron Bohmer in 2026
- Born: Ronald John Bommer II; August 15, 1961 (age 65); Cincinnati, Ohio, U.S.
- Occupations: Actor; singer; songwriter; director; keynote speaker
- Years active: 1987–present
- Known for: The Scarlet Pimpernel, Ragtime, Les Misérables, Fiddler on the Roof, The Phantom of the Opera, Sunset Boulevard
- Spouse: Sandra Joseph (m. 2002)
- Children: 2
- Website: ronbohmer.com

Ron Bohmer (born August 15, 1961) is an American actor, singer, songwriter, director, and keynote speaker best known for his musical theatre roles on Broadway and as a recording artist and singer-songwriter. He has starred in numerous Broadway productions, including The Scarlet Pimpernel as Percy, Les Misérables as Enjolras, Ragtime as the Father and Fiddler on the Roof as Fyedka, and toured the United States playing such parts as The Phantom in The Phantom of the Opera, Joe Gillis in Sunset Boulevard, Alex Dillingham in Aspects of Love and Joseph Smith in The Book of Mormon. As a concert soloist he has performed with symphony orchestras around the world.

== Early life ==
Bohmer grew up in Cincinnati, Ohio where he began studying dance at age six and singing at eight years old. He graduated from Cincinnati's School for Creative and Performing Arts in 1979 and then attended Webster University in St. Louis. After college he moved to New York City to pursue a career on Broadway. Once in New York he changed his last name from Bommer, pronounced like "bomber," to Bohmer with the first syllable pronounced like "no". He thought a stage actor's name with the word "bomb" in it might prove a temptation for critics and a distraction from his work.

== Career ==
=== Theatre ===
Bohmer's stage career spans over twenty years of Broadway productions, regional theatre and national tours. His first Broadway role was in 1990 as Fyedka in Fiddler on the Roof, followed by Enjolras in Les Misérables from 1993 to 1996. In 1992 he played Alex Dillingham in Andrew Lloyd Webber's Aspects of Love, and in 1996 he played Joe Gillis in the first national tour of Sunset Boulevard. For that role he was nominated for Chicago's Jefferson Award for Best Principal Actor in a Touring Production. In 1997 – 1998 he starred as the Phantom in the first national tour of Lloyd Webber's The Phantom of the Opera, performing in Los Angeles, Chicago and Washington, D.C. Regarding Bohmer's Phantom, The Chicago Tribune said, "He acts and sings with ringing authority, becoming both scary and tragic." In 1999 Bohmer played the title role of Percy Blakeney in The Scarlet Pimpernel. It was the musical's third incarnation, under the direction of Robert Longbottom and staged at the Neil Simon Theatre. In its review of the production The New York Times described Bohmer as an actor with "a charmingly quiet spark of glee in his eyes and a shimmery, excellent voice." He reprised his role on the U.S. tour and received a National Broadway Theatre Award nomination. In 2003's The Thing About Men he played Sebastian, a performance The New Yorker described as "Muscular, gentle . . . a dreamy tenor." He played Sir Percival Glyde in The Woman in White and Father in the Tony-nominated revival of Ragtime. In 2007 he toured as Coach Bolton in Disney's High School Musical on Stage!. In 2010–11 he took over the role of Frid in the revival of A Little Night Music, where he played opposite Elaine Stritch and Bernadette Peters. In 2012 he starred in the first national tour of The Book of Mormon, playing several roles, including Joseph Smith.

Additional Off-Broadway roles include Howard in The Joys of Sex, the title role in The Third Person, the 10th anniversary cast of I Love You, You're Perfect, Now Change, and multiple roles in New York's long-running comedy Forbidden Broadway: Special Victims Unit. In 2010 he played El Gallo in The Fantasticks at the Cincinnati Playhouse in the Park for which he received an Acclaim Award for Best Actor. In 2011–12, he starred as George in Sunday in the Park With George, opposite Erin Davie at The Repertory Theatre of St. Louis. For that role he won the 2013 St. Louis Critics Circle Award for best actor in a musical. Other Regional Performances include the title role in Floyd Collins at Actors Theatre of Louisville, Volodya in Bed & Sofa at the Wilma Theatre in Philadelphia, the title role in the U.S. premiere of Dracula at North Shore Music Theatre, Ravenal in Show Boat, Captain Von Trapp in The Sound of Music for the New Theatre, the title role in Phantom at Salt Lake's Pioneer Theatre, and Billy in Anything Goes at the Pittsburgh Civic Light Opera.

=== Singing ===
As a concert soloist, Bohmer has appeared at Radio City Music Hall, Lincoln Center, the Kennedy Center, New York City's Town Hall and with Symphonies and Pops orchestras across the country.

Bohmer has recorded three solo albums, Legacy, Everyman and Another Life, and the cast recordings of Ragtime (Revival cast recording), The Thing About Men, Forbidden Broadway, and Broadway Unplugged 2.

=== Television ===
Bohmer has appeared in several television shows, including Law & Order: SVU, Rescue Me, Ryan's Hope, One Life to Live, and As the World Turns.

== Stage roles ==
- Broadway
  - Fiddler on the Roof, Fyedka
  - Les Misérables, Enjolras
  - The Scarlet Pimpernel, Percy Blakeney (National Broadway Theatre Award Nomination)
  - The Woman in White, Sir Percival Glyde
  - Ragtime, The Father
  - A Little Night Music, Frid
- Tour
  - Fiddler on the Roof, Fyedka
  - The Phantom of the Opera, The Phantom
  - Aspects of Love, Alex Dillingham (LA Robby Award)
  - Sunset Boulevard, Joe Gillis (Jefferson Award Nomination)
  - The Scarlet Pimpernel, Percy Blakeney
  - High School Musical on Stage!, Coach Bolton
  - The Book of Mormon, Joseph Smith, Price's Dad, Mormon Mission President, Jesus Christ
- Off-Broadway
  - On the 20th Century, Max Jacobs
  - The Thing About Men, Sebastian
  - The Joys of Sex, Howard
  - Forbidden Broadway: Special Victims Unit
  - The Fantasticks, El Gallo
  - The Third Person
  - I Love You, You're Perfect, Now Change
- Regional
  - Aladdin, Aladdin
  - Of Thee I Sing, John P. Wintergreen
  - Floyd Collins, Floyd Collins
  - Bed & Sofa, Volodya (Barrymore Award Nomination)
  - Dracula: A Chamber Musical, Dracula
  - The Sound of Music, Captain Von Trapp
  - Phantom, Phantom
  - Anything Goes, Billy
  - Spamalot, Sir Dennis Galahad
  - Sunday in the Park with George, Georges Seurat/George (Theatre Critics Circle Award – Best Actor)
  - Show Boat, Ravenal
  - Children of Eden, The Father
  - Mary Poppins, George Banks
  - 42nd Street, Julian Marsh
  - Jesus Christ Superstar, Pontius Pilate

== Discography ==
- Solo
  - Legacy
  - Everyman
  - Another Life
- Cast Recordings
  - Ragtime (Original 2009 Broadway Cast)
  - The Thing About Men (2003 Original Off-Broadway Cast)
  - Forbidden Broadway
  - Broadway by the Year – 1929
  - Broadway Unplugged 2

== Personal life ==
Bohmer is married to actress and author Sandra Joseph. The two met in 1997 while performing in The Phantom of the Opera. Bohmer played the Phantom and Joseph was Christine, the Phantom's object of desire. They married in 2002, five years after meeting onstage. They live in West Orange, New Jersey. Bohmer is the father of two daughters from a previous marriage, Cassidy and Austen.
