= James Morgan (set designer) =

- Born: Naples, Florida
- Education: University of Florida
- Occupations: scenic designer, producer
- Employer: York Theatre
- Title: Producing Artistic Director

James Morgan (also known as Jim Morgan) is a prolific scenic designer who is also the Producing Artistic Director of the York Theatre Company.

== Biography and career ==
Born in Naples, Florida, Morgan attended the University of Florida and graduated in 1974 with a Bachelor of Fine Arts in scenic design.

Morgan arrived in New York City in 1974. Through an introduction from his aunt and uncle, Morgan met with Janet Hayes Walker, producer of the fledgling York Theatre Company. Beginning with designing a poster for one of the York productions, Morgan graduated to becoming the in-house set designer, eventually becoming Walker's "right-hand man." He has been quoted as saying “My experiences here were my graduate school."

Morgan applied to and was accepted into United Scenic Artists, the union for set designers. Instead of taking the usually-required difficult exam, he came with numerous credits and ample recommendations from the living composers and lyricists with whom he had developed personal contact from his years working at the York Theatre.

When Walker died in 1997, The York Theatre's board asked Morgan to assume producing responsibilities as she had requested. He chose to steer the company totally in the direction of musicals, establishing three main focuses: 1) new musicals; 2) revivals of lesser-known musicals, known as the "Musicals in Mufti" series; and 3) developmental readings of new musicals.

In addition to his voluminous work for the York Theatre, Morgan has designed productions elsewhere, most notably for the Irish Repertory Theatre.

He has been nominated twice for the Hewes Design Award, in 2012 for Ionescopade and in 2017 for Marry Harry (both produced by the York Theatre Company).

== Partial list of Scenic Design credits ==
=== Broadway ===
Information from the Internet Broadway Database.

- Anna Karenina (1992)
- Getting Married (1991)
- Taking Steps (1991)
- The Miser (1990)
- Zoya's Apartment (1990)
- Sweeney Todd (1989)

=== Off-Broadway ===
Information from the Internet Off-Broadway Database.

- Cheek to Cheek: Irving Berlin in Hollywood (2021)
- Anything Can Happen in the Theater: The Musical World of Maury Yeston (2019)
- I Spy A Spy (2019)
- Enter Laughing (2019)
- Christmas in Hell (2018)
- A Child's Christmas in Wales (Irish Repertory Theatre, 2018)
- On a Clear Day You Can See Forever (2018)
- Lonesome Blues (2018)
- Unexpected Joy (2018)
- Desperate Measures (2017)
- Marry Harry (2017)
- Finian's Rainbow (2016)
- Rothschild & Sons (2015)
- Cagney (2015)
- Texas in Paris (2015)
- Inventing Mary Martin (2014)
- Love, Linda: The Life of Mrs. Cole Porter (2013)
- Storyville (2013)
- I'm a Stranger Here Myself (2013)
- New Girl in Town (2012)
- Closer Than Ever (2012)
- Ionescopade (2012)
- Molly Sweeney (2011)
- Ernest in Love (2009)
- Aristocrats (2009)
- My Vaudeville Man! (2008)
- Enter Laughing (2008)
- Take Me Along (2008)
- Gaslight (2007)
- That Time of the Year (2006)
- Asylum: The Strange Case of Mary Lincoln (2006)
- A Fine & Private Place (2006)
- George M. Cohan Tonight! (2006)
- Thrill Me: The Leopold & Loeb Story (2005)
- She Stoops to Conquer (2005)
- The Musical of Musicals-- The Musical! (2005)
- Let's Put On A Show (2004)
- Finian's Rainbow (2004)
- Max Morath: Ragtime and Again (2004)
- The Musical of Musicals-- The Musical! (2003)
- Peg O' My Heart (2003)
- Jolson & Co. (2002)
- Pigtown (2002)
- Prodigal (2002)
- Fermat's Last Tango (2000)
- Taking a Chance on Love (2000)
- Jolson & Co. (1999)
- After the Fair (1999)
- Exactly Like You (1999)
- Little by Little (1999)
- Behind the Counter with Mussolini (1998)
- The Show Goes On (1997)
- The Last Sweet Days (1997)
- No Way to Treat a Lady (1996)
- Mata Hari (1996)
- We'll Meet Again (1995)
- A Doll's Life (1994)
- Down by the Ocean (1994)
- Merrily We Roll Along (1994)
- Smiling Through (1994)
- Booth (1994)
- Noel and Gertie (1993)
- How the Other Half Loves (1993)
- Carnival (1993)
- The Night Larry Kramer Kissed Me (1992)
- Little Me (1992)
- What About Luv? (1991)
- The Misanthrope (1991)
- A Funny Thing Happened on the Way to the Forum (1991)
- East Texas (1990)
- Come as You Are (1990)
- Sweeney Todd, The Demon Barber of Fleet Street (1989)
- Marry Me a Little (1987)
- Talley's Folly (1986)
- Macbeth (1986)
- Moby Dick (1986)
- The Time of the Cuckoo (1986)
- Cherokee County (1985)
- The Baker's Wife (1985)
- Hang on to the Good Times (1985)
- The Miser (1984)
- Pacific Overtures (1984)
