= Joshua Rosenblum =

American composer, conductor, pianist, arranger, music journalist, and writer

- Born: May 10, 1963 (age 63)
- Genres: Musical theater Contemporary classical music
- Occupations: Composer; Music journalist Lecturer (Yale); Conductor; Arranger
- Instrument: Piano

Joshua Rosenblum (born May 10, 1963) is an American composer, conductor, pianist, arranger, music journalist, and author. He has composed extensively for the concert hall as well as for musical theater, and currently teaches musical theater composition at Yale University, his alma mater, as well as both conducting and orchestration at New York University. As a pianist, he has performed frequently in the New York City area as soloist and accompanist, as well as in Broadway pit orchestras, and with the New York City Center Encores! Orchestra. He has conducted numerous Broadway and Off-Broadway shows, including How the Grinch Stole Christmas!, Wonderful Town, Falsettos, Miss Saigon, and Anything Goes. He served as pianist and associate conductor for the hit 2022 Broadway revival of Stephen Sondheim and James Lapine's Into the Woods, and can be heard playing on the Grammy-winning original cast recording.

== Education ==
Rosenblum attended Marietta High School in his hometown of Marietta, Ohio, and spent summers at the Interlochen Arts Camp in Interlochen, Michigan. He graduated summa cum laude from Yale College in 1983 at the age of 20, and proceeded directly to graduate school at the Yale School of Music, where he studied piano with Ward Davenny and Donald Currier, and played in master classes for Claude Frank. Among his composition teachers were Jacob Druckman, Martin Bresnick, and Frank Lewin (Composition for Film). He earned his M.M. in Piano Performance in 1985. Rosenblum is now a faculty member at Yale, where he has taught Composing for Musical Theater since 2006.

Rosenblum joined the music faculty of New York University's Steinhardt School in spring 2020, and has conducted several musicals and operas there.

== Musical theater ==
Rosenblum composed the score for the Off-Broadway show Fermat's Last Tango, a musical version of the story of Andrew Wiles, the Princeton mathematician who proved Fermat’s Last Theorem, the most famous unsolved problem in mathematics. The show was a collaboration between Rosenblum and his wife, novelist, librettist and singer Joanne Sydney Lessner, who wrote the book and co-wrote the lyrics with Rosenblum. Fermat’s Last Tango ran in New York at the York Theatre Company, and received its international premiere at Teatro da Trindade in Lisbon. Rosenblum and Lessner also collaborated on Einstein's Dreams (based on the best-selling novel by Alan Lightman), Garbo and Me, based on the life of screen legend Greta Garbo, and The Haunted Hotel, which was commissioned by the Signature Theatre in Virginia as part of their New American Voices Project. Einstein’s Dreams was given a concert performance at Symphony Space in 2009 starring John Bolton and Kate Shindle, and also received performances at Teatro da Trindade in Lisbon. The show had its Off-Broadway premiere production in 2019, presented by the Prospect Theater Company at 59E59 Theaters, with first preview performance on November 5 and the closing performance on December 14. The Off-Broadway production of Einstein's Dreams was nominated for four Drama Desk Awards, including Outstanding Music (Rosenblum), Outstanding Lyrics (Lessner and Rosenblum), Outstanding Lighting Design (Herrick Goldman), and Outstanding Projections (David Bengali).

Rosenblum wrote the songs and incidental music for Quincy Long's play The Joy of Going Somewhere Definite, which ran Off-Broadway at the Atlantic Theater Company in 1997.

In 2005, in response to the re-election of President George W. Bush, Rosenblum created the satirical musical revue Bush is Bad, which ran for a year and a half at New York’s Triad Theater, and spawned additional productions in Los Angeles, Minneapolis, and Charleston, SC. In its original iteration, it starred Kate Baldwin, Michael McCoy, and Neal Mayer, who each portrayed multiple figures in the Bush administration. Also along political lines, Rosenblum wrote book, music, and lyrics for Mark Felt, Superstar, which tells the story of the Watergate scandal from the perspective of "Deep Throat," the FBI official who was the secret source for journalists Bob Woodward and Carl Bernstein of the Washington Post. Mark Felt, Superstar had performances at the Triad in April 2015, and a limited run at the York Theatre in 2017. In February 2016, the Royal Central School of Speech and Drama in London presented a devised musical theater work consisting of Rosenblum's songs, entitled "Love is Not a Science". As a result, the Central School commissioned Rosenblum and Lessner to write a new musical, based on the play Stage Door by Edna Ferber and George S. Kaufman, which received its world premiere production in May 2017. In November 2021, the Central School presented the world premiere production of Rosenblum and Lessner's musical Garbo and Me, based on the life of legendary screen actress Greta Garbo.

== Concert music ==
Rosenblum has composed extensively for the concert hall, and his works can be heard on two recordings, Impetuosities and Sundry Notes, both on the Albany Records label. In 2009, Rosenblum founded The Pit Stop Players, a chamber group composed of New York freelance musicians. The group focuses on contemporary classical music, including Rosenblum’s own compositions, but also plays pieces from a wide variety of other genres, including rock, jazz, fusion, opera, and film music. The group's concerts have been critically acclaimed. A 2012 performance featured Rosenblum's original work, "A Young Person's Guide to the Pit Stop Players." The piece, an homage to Britten's similarly titled "A Young Person's Guide to the Orchestra," was narrated by actress/activist Cynthia Nixon.

== Music journalism ==
Rosenblum contributed CD and performance reviews as well as feature articles to Opera News magazine on a regular basis from 1999 through 2023. He has also written for Newsday, Stagebill, ZEALnyc, and The Charleston Post and Courier (as Overview Critic for the Spoleto Festival USA). His books include Closer Than Ever: The Unique Six-Decade Partnership of Richard Maltby, Jr. and David Shire, published by Oxford University Press, and A Very Unusual Way: Maury Yeston and His Singular Path to Broadway and Beyond, published by SUNY Press.
