= Joanne Sydney Lessner =

American musical theatre librettist and playwright

Joanne Sydney Lessner (also Joanne Lessner) is an American musical theater librettist, playwright, novelist and performer. She won the 2010 Heiress Productions' Playwriting Competition and was nominated for the Drama Desk Award for Outstanding Lyrics in 2020.

In collaboration with her husband, composer Joshua Rosenblum, she has written nine musicals: Garbo & Me, Love is not a Science, Stage Door (based on the play by Edna Ferber and George S. Kaufman), Fermat’s Last Tango, The Haunted Hotel, Appalachian Hanukkah, Abby, Arabian Nights, and Einstein’s Dreams (based on the novel by Alan Lightman), which was nominated for four Drama Desk Awards after an Off-Broadway 2019 run at 59E59 Theater, New York.

Her play Critical Mass won the 2010 Heiress Productions' Playwriting Competition and was produced at the Lion Theater, New York.

She is the author of the novel Pandora's Bottle and four mysteries in the Isobel Spice series: The Temporary Detective Bad Publicity, And Justice for Some, and Offed Stage Left.

Lessner made her Broadway debut in Cyrano - The Musical, and has appeared Off Broadway as Marta in Company, Juliet in Romeo and Juliet (with Marni Nixon as the Nurse), and Bolcom & Weinstein's Casino Paradise at The Ballroom (with André De Shields). A Gilbert & Sullivan specialist, she has performed leading roles in almost all the operas, including Mabel in Pirates of Penzance at Skylight Music Theatre, Phyllis in Iolanthe with the Harrisburg Symphony (starring Joshua Malina), and Julia Jellicoe in The Grand Duke at the International Gilbert & Sullivan Festival in Buxton, England, for which she was named Best Female Performer. She is also a longtime member of the Blue Hill Troupe. Lessner's regional theater credits include Rosie in Mamma Mia! and Trina in Falsettos at Weston Theater Company, and Constanze in Amadeus at Wayside Theatre.

Lessner graduated summa cum laude from Yale University.
