= Anthropology of an American Girl =

2003 novel by Hilary Thayer Hamann

Spiegel & Grau hardcover version, May 2010

Anthropology of an American Girl is the first novel by American author Hilary Thayer Hamann. It is the story of a search for authenticity told in the first-person voice of teenaged protagonist Eveline Auerbach. The semi-autobiographical literary novel contains an examination of the social and cultural pressures that prevent individuals from living meaningfully. It was independently published in 2003, and re-released in 2010 by Spiegel & Grau, a division of Random House, both times to critical praise. The novel has been compared to J.D. Salinger's The Catcher in the Rye.

Hamann wrote Anthropology of an American Girl, a semi-autobiographical coming-of-age story about Eveline Auerbach, a young woman growing up in Reagan-era America. Hamann was inspired to write the novel after taking graduate anthropology courses at NYU. The novel was first published by Vernacular Press in 2003. Hamann did not send the manuscript to agents or publishers until Vernacular closed in June 2007. Anthropology was purchased for publication two months later by Spiegel & Grau, and was re-released in May 2010. The paperback version was released in June 2011.

The new version was edited by Cindy Spiegel, senior vice president and publisher of Spiegel & Grau, and former vice president and publisher of Riverhead Books, where she edited Khaled Hosseini's The Kite Runner.

The book has been published in Australia by Allen & Unwin, in Italy by Fandango Libri, and in the UK by Constable & Robinson.

== Critical reception: original version ==
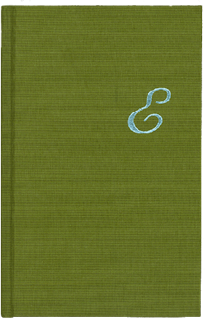
Vernacular Press hardcover version, 2003

Anthropology of an American Girl received strong reviews upon initial publication. Library Journal called the novel "Henry James meets the 21st Century," "intelligent and insightful." Also according to Library Journal, "Eveline, or Evie, is not a stereotypical 'American Girl'; nor is the book a standard coming-of-age story."

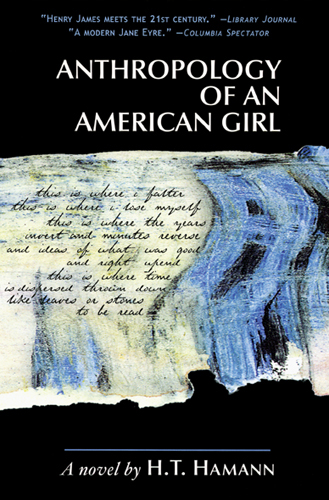
Vernacular Press paperback version, 2003

The Providence Journal cited the novel for its "gorgeous detail and nuanced thought" and "poetically rendered, astute perceptions." It stated that "Anthropology of an American Girl is an extraordinary debut, updating the 19th-century social-psychological novel of romance and manners. Like Jane Austen, George Eliot or Edith Wharton, H.T. Hamann critiques her era and culture through the tale of a precocious young woman buffeted by the accidents, values and consequences of her age."

Anthropology was praised by publications with diverse demographics. Ms. Magazine cited it for its "gorgeous language and brilliant observation," and Romantic Times Book Club Magazine called it a "magnificently intense love story," awarding the novel its highest possible rating.

The novel won a "Notable Fiction Award" from Writers' Notes (2004); ForeWord Magazine named it a Book of the Year "Fiction Finalist" (2003).

== Critical reception: edited version ==
The novel received a starred review from Publishers Weekly, which called the book "exquisitely rendered," and added, "If publishers could figure out a way to turn crack into a book, it'd read a lot like this."

Kirkus Reviews also gave the novel a starred review, calling it a "closely observed, Holden Caulfieldish story of teendom" that is "intelligent and without a false note—a memorable work." The review added that "Eveline is a marvelously complex and tragic figure of disconnection, startlingly real and exposed at all times."

O Magazine said that the novel is "a realistic, resonant, and universal story," adding that "Evie has a deadpan delivery Holden Caulfield might envy." The magazine also stated that "Hamann's depiction of time and place is stunningly accurate."

The Washington Post praised it as "a very respectable and serious descendant of the work of D.H. Lawrence," adding that Hamann had created "a carefully devised, coherent world, filled with opinions that need to be spoken—and heard." It also called the novel "A stern rebuke to chick lit everywhere," adding that the story "reminds us that all human lives are potentially sacred; that no lives should be judged and dismissed out of hand; that young women, though seen for eons as primarily just attractive objects, actually possess soul and will and sentience."

According to the Chicago Tribune, "Hamann has a hugely engaging voice and one that is rich with social and psychological insights."

The Dallas Morning News said, "This impressive debut is epic but not overwrought, and brilliant without the slightest hint of smugness. A rare kind of novel—at once sprawling and intimate—whose excellence matches its grand ambition."

The Chicago Sun-Times said that Anthropology "Showcases all the nuance and character insight of the masters. But it also has a thrilling contemporary edge that seems to just about perfectly capture the ethos, angst, and danger of a time close to our own," calling Hamann "one of the most engaging, evolving voices in contemporary fiction." Adding that, "The author is pitch perfect in rendering the times. It's a time that's post-postwar and pre-Internet, and it's never seemed so intriguing."

East Hampton Independent called the novel "An ethnographic exploration of youth culture," "haunting, wise, and hip," with "its ear-perfect dialogue and erotic charge."

Respected book seller e-zine, Shelf Awareness, said that Anthropology is a "magnificent book," "incredibly intense and passionate," "romantic in the grand sense," "a rich, affecting experience," and "completely entrancing."

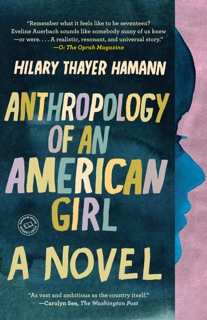
Spiegel & Grau paperback version, June 2011

== Criticism ==
Despite overwhelmingly positive reviews, the novel was sometimes criticized for its length.

Though Philadelphia City Paper called Anthropology "lyrical and analytic," adding that the "depth of character examination...generates the novel's powerful, sympathetic backbone and propels a complex coming-of-age tale for a new generation," it also stated that the book was "overly lengthy."

Newcity Lit wrote that the book "gives us a vocabulary for coming-of-age in a contemporary world," but that "Like The Fountainhead, Anthropology is too long."

New Zealand Listener called the book "a remarkable, honest and vivid achievement," adding that "What Hamann brings to this world is a woman's voice that is fresh and full of feeling." But NZL added that "For some, the high school years may go on too long. However, the novel attains a gravitas that is unexpected and welcome. Eveline, in the end, is more George Eliot than Jane Austen."

The Washington Post called Anthropology "as vast and ambitious as the country itself, a panorama of a particular culture being born and dying and being reborn again. The book is a lengthy exegesis on the merits of first love and true love--in this case, two very different phenomena." But it also stated that "the novel, with its many pages and its extensive cast of characters, aspires to comparison with War and Peace."

== Author quotes ==
"This is a story of personhood, of growing by degrees."

"I wanted to take a long hard view of personal development in American culture. I decided to go back to the girl I'd been, and to other girls I'd known, in order to tease everything apart to find the ways in which we resisted stereotype or conformed to it. I wanted to study the idea of freedom and its applications and misapplications on a daily basis, and that took time."

"I studied anthropology and ethnographic filmmaking in graduate school at NYU, and while considering other cultures and the ways in which people and places are represented, my thoughts turned to my own country, my ethnicity, my heritage...I thought about what constitutes my culture and my place in it. In order to investigate a big concept with a measure of authenticity, I relied on a single voice. And so, this is also a story of personhood, of growing by degrees. You know, being human is automatic, but being a person—a being with special moral and spiritual qualities—requires tremendous effort. It is a privilege and a responsibility."
