= The Civil War (musical) =

1998 musical by Gregory Boyd, Frank Wildhorn, Jack Murphy

- Original Recording
- Music: Frank Wildhorn
- Lyrics: Jack Murphy
- Book: Gregory Boyd; Frank Wildhorn
- Productions: 1998 Houston; 1999 Broadway; 2000 US National Tour; 2007 Gettysburg, PA; 2009 Washington, D.C. 2015 Washington, D.C.

The Civil War is a musical written by Gregory Boyd and Frank Wildhorn, with lyrics by Jack Murphy and music by Wildhorn. The musical centers on the American Civil War, with the musical numbers portraying the war through Union, Confederate, and slave viewpoints. The musical was nominated for two Tony Awards, including the Tony Award for Best Musical. Its styles include gospel, folk, country, rock, and rhythm and blues.

== Production history ==
The musical had its world premiere at the Alley Theatre, Houston, Texas, on September 16, 1998, where co-author Boyd is the Artistic Director. The production was supervised by Gregory Boyd, with musical staging by George Faison and staging by Nick Corley. The cast featured Linda Eder (Hanna Hopes), Keith Byron Kirk (Frederick Douglass), Beth Leavel (Mrs. Lydia Bixby/Violet), Jesse Lenat (Autolycus Fell), Capathia Jenkins (Hope Jackson), Matt Bogart (Pvt. Nathaniel Taylor), and Michael Lanning (Capt. Emmet Lochran).

The musical premiered on Broadway at the St. James Theatre on April 22, 1999 and closed on June 13, 1999, running for 61 performances and 35 previews. Directed by Jerry Zaks with musical staging by Luis Perez, the cast featured Leavel as Mabel/Mrs. Bixby, Kirk as Frederick Douglass, Bogart as Private Sam Taylor, Gilles Chiasson (Corp. William McEwen), Capathia Jenkins (Harriet Jackson), David M. Lutken (Voice of Abraham Lincoln/Corp. Henry Stewart), Irene Molloy (Sarah McEwen), and Leo Burmester as Autolycus Fell.

A studio cast album was released in 1999 by Atlantic Records, and included Linda Eder, Maya Angelou, James Garner, Hootie & the Blowfish, Travis Tritt, Dr. John and Betty Buckley. Both a double-disc album was released as "The Complete Work", and a "highlights" version entitled "The Nashville Sessions". "The Nashville Sessions" charted on Billboard's Top Country Albums, eventually peaking at #48.

The musical toured in the United States, starting in January 2000 in Cincinnati, Ohio. The original cast of 28 was reduced to 15. "Rather than playing individual characters, they all play everyman - a soldier, a wife, a nurse, a girlfriend, a slave." Stephen Rayne directed, with a cast that included Larry Gatlin alternating with John Schneider and BeBe Winans.

The Civil War was one of the productions produced at the newly renovated Ford's Theatre (Washington, D.C.), running from March 27, 2009 through May 24. Directed by Jeff Calhoun, the 16-member cast featured Jarrod Emick, Eleasha Gamble, Michael Lanning and Timothy Shew, with the recorded voice of Hal Holbrook as Lincoln. The production is conceived in a concert setting.

In 2006, a new version of the musical opened at the Majestic Theatre in Gettysburg, Pennsylvania. Called For the Glory: The Civil War Musical in Gettysburg, it featured two new songs and a new structure.

== Songs ==
(As presented on Broadway, 1999)

Act 1

- A House Divided – The Citizens
- Freedom's Child – Frederick Douglass and Abolitionists
- By The Sword / Sons of Dixie – The Armies
- Tell My Father – Private Sam Taylor
- The Peculiar Institution – The Enslaved
- If Prayin' Were Horses – Clayton Toler and Bessie Toler
- Greenback – Autolycus Fell, Mabel and Violet
- Missing You (My Bill) – Sarah McEwen
- Judgment Day – Captain Billy Pierce, Captain Emmett Lochran, Private Sam Taylor and The Armies
- Father, How Long? – Clayton Toler
- Someday – Harriet Jackson, Bessie Toler and Others
- I'll Never Pass This Way Again – Corporal Henry Stewart
- How Many Devils? – The Armies

Act 2

- Virginia – Captain Billy Pierce
- Candle in the Window – Harriet Jackson
- Oh! Be Joyful! – Autolycus Fell, Sergeant Byron Richardson, Private Conrad Bock and Private Elmore Hotchkiss
- The Hospital – Mrs. Bixby, Nurse, Union Soldiers and Clayton Toler
- If Prayin' Were Horses (Reprise) – Clayton Toler and Bessie Toler
- River Jordan – Benjamin Reynolds and Others
- Sarah – Corporal William McEwen
- The Honor of Your Name – Sarah McEwen
- Greenback (Reprise) – Autolycus Fell and Violet
- Northbound Train – Captain Emmett Lochran
- Last Waltz for Dixie – Captain Billy Pierce and Confederate Soldiers
- The Glory – Captain Emmett Lochran, Frederick Douglass, Benjamin Reynolds and Full Company

== Reception ==
The Variety review of the Alley Theatre production said that the show was “not so much a traditional musical as a revue-style presentation of a song cycle. Wildhorn and co-creators Jack Murphy and Gregory Boyd impose precious little narrative structure on 'The Civil War', preferring instead to integrate individual, self-contained vignettes as elements in a thematically consistent but essentially bookless concert". The production used "rear-screen projections of photos, paintings and letters [to] evoke the period setting".

It was panned by critics, including The New York Times, which found it "generic...without plot and essentially without character".

The song "Tell My Father", originating from the musical, was adapted into a choir piece by Andrea Ramsey and continues to be performed by male choirs, separated from its original work.

== Recordings ==
=== The Nashville Sessions ===
The Civil War: The Nashville Sessions

Cast recording by Various Artists
- Released: November 3, 1998
- Genres: Showtune, Country, Rock, Pop
- Length: 59:52
- Label: Warner/Reprise

No.	Title	Artist	Length
1.	"Prologue"	Charlie Daniels	1:25
2.	"The Day the Sun Stood Still"	Travis Tritt	4:53
3.	"Missing You (My Bill)"	Deana Carter	3:44
4.	"Virginia"	Gene Miller	4:51
5.	"Old Gray Coat"	Trace Adkins	3:49
6.	"I'll Never Pass This Way Again"	Tracy Lawrence	3:26
7.	"River Jordan"	BeBe Winans	6:41
8.	"With These Hands"	Bryan White & Amy Grant	4:42
9.	"Judgment Day"	Shiloh	5:11
10.	"Tell My Father"	Kevin Sharp	4:11
11.	"I Never Knew His Name"	Linda Eder	3:36
12.	"Regimental Drummer"	Michael English	4:14
13.	"The Honor of Your Name"	Trisha Yearwood	3:50
14.	"In Great Deeds"	Charlie Daniels	0:39
15.	"Last Waltz for Dixie"	John Berry	4:40
Total length:			59:52

=== The Complete Work ===
The Civil War: The Complete Work

Cast recording by Various Artists
- Released: January 5, 1999
- Genres: Showtune, Country, Rock, Pop
- Length: 2:16:26
- Label: Atlantic

Disc 1
No.	Title	Artist	Length
1.	"Prologue"	Charlie Daniels	1:24
2.	"Brother, My Brother"	Michael Scott Lanning	2:54
3.	"Lincoln: The Better Angels Of Our Nature"	James Garner	1:54
4.	"By The Sword/Sons Of Dixie"	Broadway All-Stars	4:23
5.	"Tell My Father"	Kevin Sharp	4:10
6.	"My Name Is Frederick Douglass"	Danny Glover	1:31
7.	"Freedom's Child"	Hootie & The Blowfish	4:19
8.	"Missing You (My Bill)"	Deana Carter	3:44
9.	"If Prayin' Were Horses"	Michael Bell & Cheryl Freeman	4:08
10.	"Virginia"	Gene Miller	4:52
11.	"The Day The Sun Stood Still"	Travis Tritt	4:53
12.	"Oh Be Joyful"	Broadway All-Stars	4:31
13.	"Frederick Douglass: The Destiny Of America"	Danny Glover	0:51
14.	"Father How Long?"	Michael Bell	3:25
15.	"Reprise: Brother, My Brother"	Michael Scott Lanning	1:37
16.	"A Nurse's Diary"	Linda Eder	2:14
17.	"I Never Knew His Name"	Linda Eder	3:36
18.	"Still I Rise"	Maya Angelou	0:57
19.	"River Jordan"	BeBe Winans	6:41

Disc 2
No.	Title	Artist	Length
1.	"Lincoln: The Bottom Is Out Of The Tub"	James Garner	1:06
2.	"How Many Devils?"	Broadway All-Stars	3:57
3.	"Old Gray Coat"	Trace Adkins	3:50
4.	"With These Hands"	Amy Grant & Bryan White	4:41
5.	"The White House At Night"	Ellen Burstyn	1:31
6.	"A Candle In The Window"	Linda Eder	5:04
7.	"Greenback"	Dr. John	4:37
8.	"Sojourner Truth: Ain't I A Woman?"	Maya Angelou	1:30
9.	"Someday"	Patti LaBelle	6:35
10.	"Regimental Drummer"	Michael English	4:14
11.	"I'll Never Pass This Way Again"	Tracy Lawrence	3:27
12.	"Lincoln: Letter To Mrs. Bixby"	James Garner	1:12
13.	"Five Boys"	Betty Buckley	3:12
14.	"Judgement Day"	Shiloh	5:11
15.	"Sarah"	Carl Anderson	4:10
16.	"The Honor Of Your Name"	Trisha Yearwood	3:52
17.	"Northbound Train"	John Popper	4:58
18.	"Last Waltz For Dixie"	John Berry	3:26
19.	"In Great Deeds"	Charlie Daniels	0:38
20.	"The Glory"	Michael Lanning, Gene Miller, Linda Eder And Choir	7:11

== Awards and nominations ==
=== Original Broadway production ===
Year	Award	Category	Nominee	Result
1999	Tony Award	Best Musical		Nominated
1999	Tony Award	Best Original Score	Frank Wildhorn and Jack Murphy	Nominated
1999	Drama Desk Award	Outstanding Musical		Nominated
1999	Drama Desk Award	Outstanding Featured Actor in a Musical	Michel Bell	Nominated
1999	Drama Desk Award	Outstanding Featured Actress in a Musical	Cheryl Freeman	Nominated
1999	Drama Desk Award	Outstanding Music	Frank Wildhorn	Nominated
1999	Drama Desk Award	Outstanding Lighting Design	Paul Gallo	Nominated
