= Kirsten Shepherd-Barr =

Kirsten E. Shepherd (formerly Shepherd-Barr) is an academic specialising in Victorian and modern English literature, the interaction between science and literature, and theatre studies, especially science in theatre. In 2015, she was appointed a professor of English and Theatre Studies at the University of Oxford.

== Career ==
After completing a Bachelor of Arts degree in English at Yale University, Shepherd worked in publishing for two years before completing a Master of Arts programme at the University of Oslo, funded by a Fulbright Grant, and then a Doctor of Philosophy degree in English at the University of Oxford. She taught at North Carolina State University, the University of Pennsylvania, the Curtis Institute of Music in Philadelphia and the University of Birmingham, before taking up a post at Oxford in 2007 as a fellow and tutor at St Catherine's College.

== Works ==
Shepherd's research has focused primarily on the way that plays and performances "have engaged with scientific ideas", which she has explored in her books Science on Stage: From Doctor Faustus to Copenhagen (2006), and Theatre and Evolution from Ibsen to Beckett (2015), the research for which was funded by a Leverhulme Research Fellowship in 2011–12. She also specialises on the work of the Norwegian playwright Henrik Ibsen, publishing Ibsen and Early Modernist Theatre, 1890–1900 in 1997. Her published works include:

- Modern Drama: A Very Short Introduction (Oxford: Oxford University Press, 2016)
- "'Unmediated' Science Plays: Seeing What Sticks", in Willis, M. (ed.), Staging Science: Scientific Performances on Street, Stage, and Screen, (Palgrave Macmillan, 2016), pp. 105–123
- "The Diagnostic Gaze: Nineteenth-Century Contexts for Performance and Medicine" in Bouchard, G., Mermikides, A. (eds.), Performance and the Medical Body (Routledge, 2016), pp. 37–50
- (with S. Eltis), "What Was the New Drama?" in Marcus, L., Mendelssohn, M., Shepherd-Barr, K. E. (eds.), Late Victorian into Modern (Oxford: Oxford University Press, 2016)
- Theatre and Evolution from Ibsen to Beckett (Columbia University Press, 2015)
- "'I'm Evolving!': Varieties of Evolution on the Victorian Stage" in Lightman, B., Zon, B. (eds.), Evolution and Victorian Culture (Cambridge: Cambridge University Press, 2014), pp. 149–172
- "'It Was Ugly': Maternal Instinct on Stage at the Fin de Siècle", Women: a cultural review, vol. 23, issue 2 (2012), pp. 216–234
- "Staging Modernism: A New Drama" in Brooker, P., Gasiorek, A., Longworth, D., and Thacker, A., The Oxford Handbook of Modernisms, (Oxford: Oxford University Press, 2011), pp. 122–138
- "Des 'Lien significatifs': Luca Ronconi et les scientifiques ['Meaningful Joinings': Luca Ronconi and the Scientists]", Alternatives Theatrales, issue 102–103 (2009), pp. 28–33
- "Darwin on Stage: Evolutionary Theory in the Theatre", Interdiscipliniary Science Reviews, vol. 33, issue 2 (2008), pp. 107–115
- "The Development of Norway’s National Theatres" in Wilmer, S. E. (ed.), National Theatres in a Changing Europe (Basingstoke: Palgrave Macmillan, 2008), pp. 85–98
- "Wilde About Ibsen: The Fusion of Dramatic Modes in A Woman of No Importance" in Smith, P. E. (ed.), Approaches to Teaching the Works of Oscar Wilde (New York: Modern Language Association of America, 2008), pp. 126–134
- "Science and Theatre in Open Dialogue: Biblioetica, Le Cas de Sophie K., and the Postdramatic Science Play", Interdisciplinary Science Reviews (2006), pp. 245–253
- "Ibsen's Globalism", Ibsen Studies (2006), pp. 188–198
- Science on Stage From Doctor Faustus to Copenhagen (Princeton University Press, 2006)
- "From Copenhagen to Infinity and Beyond: Science Meets Literature on Stage", Interdisciplinary Science Reviews, vol. 28, issue 3 (2003)
- "Hilbert's Hotel, Other Paradoxes, Come to Life in New 'Math Play'", SIAM Journal on Applied Mathematics, vol 36, issue 7 (2003)
- "Acting out the search for infinity", Physics World, vol. 16, issue 7 (2003), pp. 38–39
- "Reconsidering Joyce's Exiles in its Theatrical Context", Theatre Research International, vol. 28, issue 2 (2003), pp. 169–180
- "Copenhagen and Beyond: The ‘Rich and Mentally Nourishing' Interplay of Science and Theatre", Gramma: Journal of Theory and Criticism, vol. 10 (2002)
- "Science as Theater", American Scientist, vol. 90, issue 6 (2002), pp. 550–550
- "Ibsen, Munch, and the Relationship between Modernist Theatre and Art", Nordic Theatre Studies (Special issue on Historiography), vol. 12 (2000), pp. 43–53
- "'Mise en Scent': The Théâtre d'Art's Cantique des cantiques and the Use of Smell as a Theatrical Device", Theatre Research International, vol. 24, issue 2 (1999), pp. 152–159
- "Madeleines and Neuromodernism: Reassessing Mechanisms of Autobiographical Memory in Proust", Biography Studies, vol. 13, issue 1 (1998), pp. 39–60
- Ibsen and Early Modernist Theatre, 1890–1900 (Greenwood Publishing Group, 1997)
