= Einstein's Dreams =

1992 novel by Alan Lightman

- London, Vintage, 2004
- Author: Alan Lightman
- Language: English
- Genre: novel
- Published: 1992
- Publication place: United Kingdom
- Media type: Print
- Pages: 192
- ISBN: 0679416463

Einstein's Dreams is a 1992 novel by Alan Lightman that was an international bestseller and has been translated into thirty languages. It was runner up for the 1994 L. L. Winship/PEN New England Award. Einstein's Dreams was also the March 1998 selection for National Public Radio's "Talk of the Nation" Book Club. The novel has been used in numerous colleges and universities, in many cases for university-wide adoptions in "common-book" programs. New York Times book critic Michiko Kakutani wrote about the book: "As in Calvino's work, the fantastical elements of the stories are grounded in precise, crystalline prose. As in Jorge Luis Borges's ficciones, carefully observed particulars open out, like doors in an advent calendar, to disclose a magical, metaphysical realm beyond."

Einstein's Dreams was first adapted for the stage by David Gardiner and Ralf Remshardt and performed at the University of Florida in 1996. An off-off-Broadway production of this stage version ran briefly at the New York Fringe Festival in 2001; it has also been performed in Beijing (2009).

A musical adaptation of Einstein's Dreams, with book and lyrics by Joanne Sydney Lessner and music and lyrics by Joshua Rosenblum had its international debut in Lisbon in 2005. A concert performance of the Lessner-Rosenblum adaptation took place at Symphony Space in New York in 2009, starring John Bolton and Kate Shindle. The performance was a benefit fundraiser for the Harpswell Foundation, a nonprofit organization founded by Lightman, whose mission is to advance a new generation of women leaders in southeast Asia.

The Lessner-Rosenblum musical had its Off-Broadway premiere at New York's 59E59 Theaters in November, 2019, produced by the Prospect Theater Company and directed by Cara Reichel.

== Plot ==
The novel fictionalizes Albert Einstein as a young scientist who is troubled by dreams as he works on his theory of relativity in 1905. The book consists of 35 sections, each either devoted to one dream about time that Einstein had, or to a waking scene surrounding Einstein's behavior and health during the creation of his theory of relativity. These waking sections include a prelude, three interludes, and an epilogue. Einstein's friend, Michele Besso, appears in some of these sections. Each dream involves a conception of time. Some scenarios may involve exaggerations of true phenomena related to relativity, and some may be entirely fantastical. The book demonstrates the relationship each human being has to time, and thus spiritually affirms Einstein's theory of relativity.

The novel is sometimes cited as the source of the apocryphal urban legend, the 'universal force' (of love), purportedly elucidated in a letter from Einstein to his daughter, Lieserl, but the novel does not contain 'the letter'.
