= Tony Award for Best Featured Actress in a Musical =

American theatre award for Broadway actresses

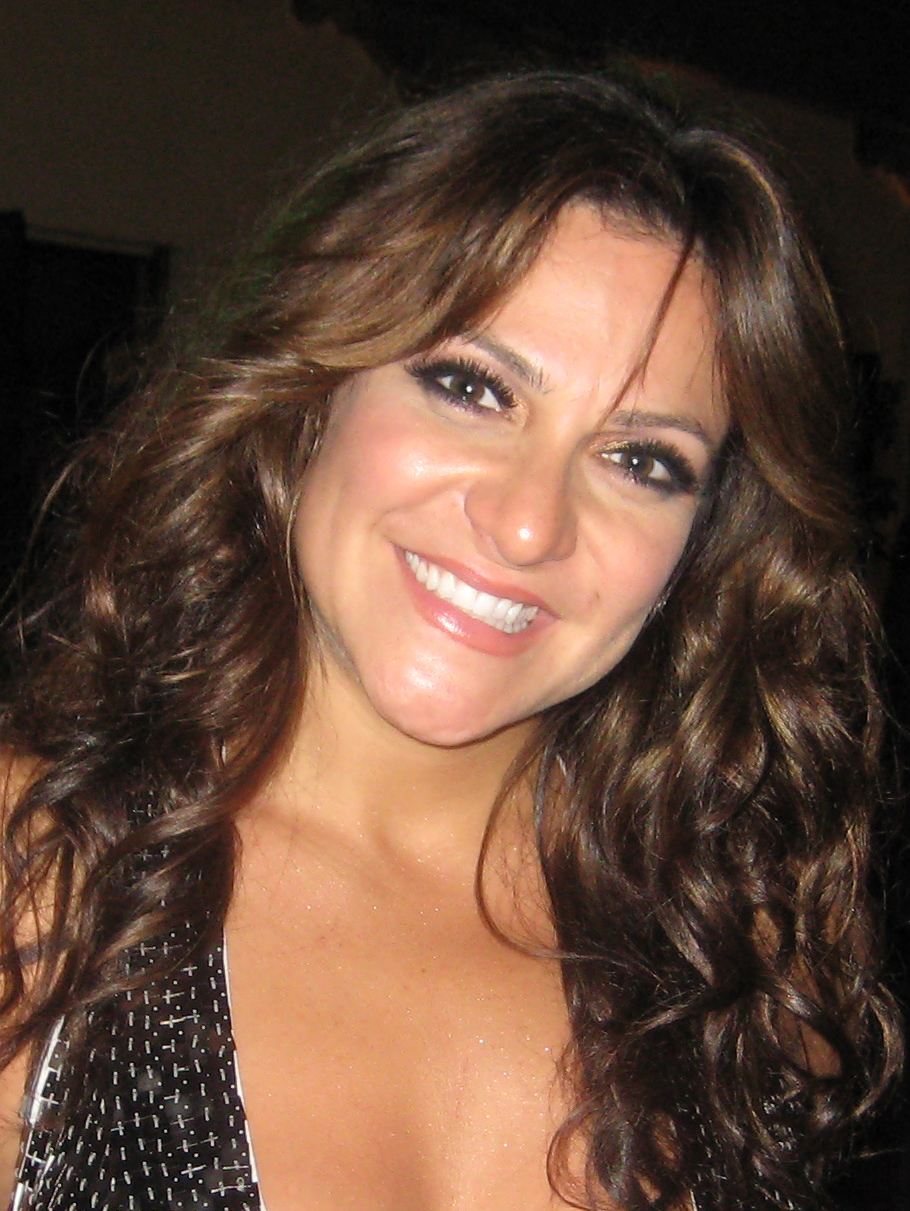
- 2026 Recipient: Shoshana Bean
- Awarded for: Best Performance by a Featured Actress in a Musical
- Location: United States New York City
- Presented by: American Theatre Wing The Broadway League
- Currently held by: Shoshana Bean for The Lost Boys (2026)
- Website: TonyAwards.com

The Tony Award for Best Performance by a Featured Actress in a Musical is an honor presented at the Tony Awards, a ceremony established in 1947 as the Antoinette Perry Awards for Excellence in Theatre, to actresses for quality supporting roles in a musical play, whether a new production or a revival. The awards are named after Antoinette Perry, an American actress who died in 1946.

Honors in several categories are presented at the ceremony annually by the Tony Award Productions, a joint venture of The Broadway League and the American Theatre Wing, to "honor the best performances and stage productions of the previous year."

The award was originally called the Tony Award for Best Performance by an Actress in a Featured or Supporting Role in a Musical. It was first presented to Juanita Hall at the 4th Tony Awards for her portrayal of Bloody Mary in South Pacific. Before 1956, nominees' names were not made public; the change was made by the awards committee to "have a greater impact on theatregoers". The category was renamed to its current title in 1976.

Judy Kaye, Andrea Martin and Audra McDonald share the record for having the most wins in this category, with a total of two. Carrie Pipperidge in Carousel and Marge MacDougall in Promises, Promises are the characters to take the award the most times, winning twice. Louise from Gypsy is currently the character with the most nominations in this category, with six. Additionally, each eligible Louise has been nominated for this award.

== Winners and nominees ==
indicates the winner

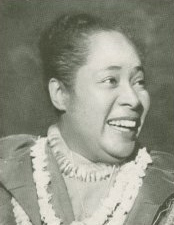
Juanita Hall won for South Pacific (1950)

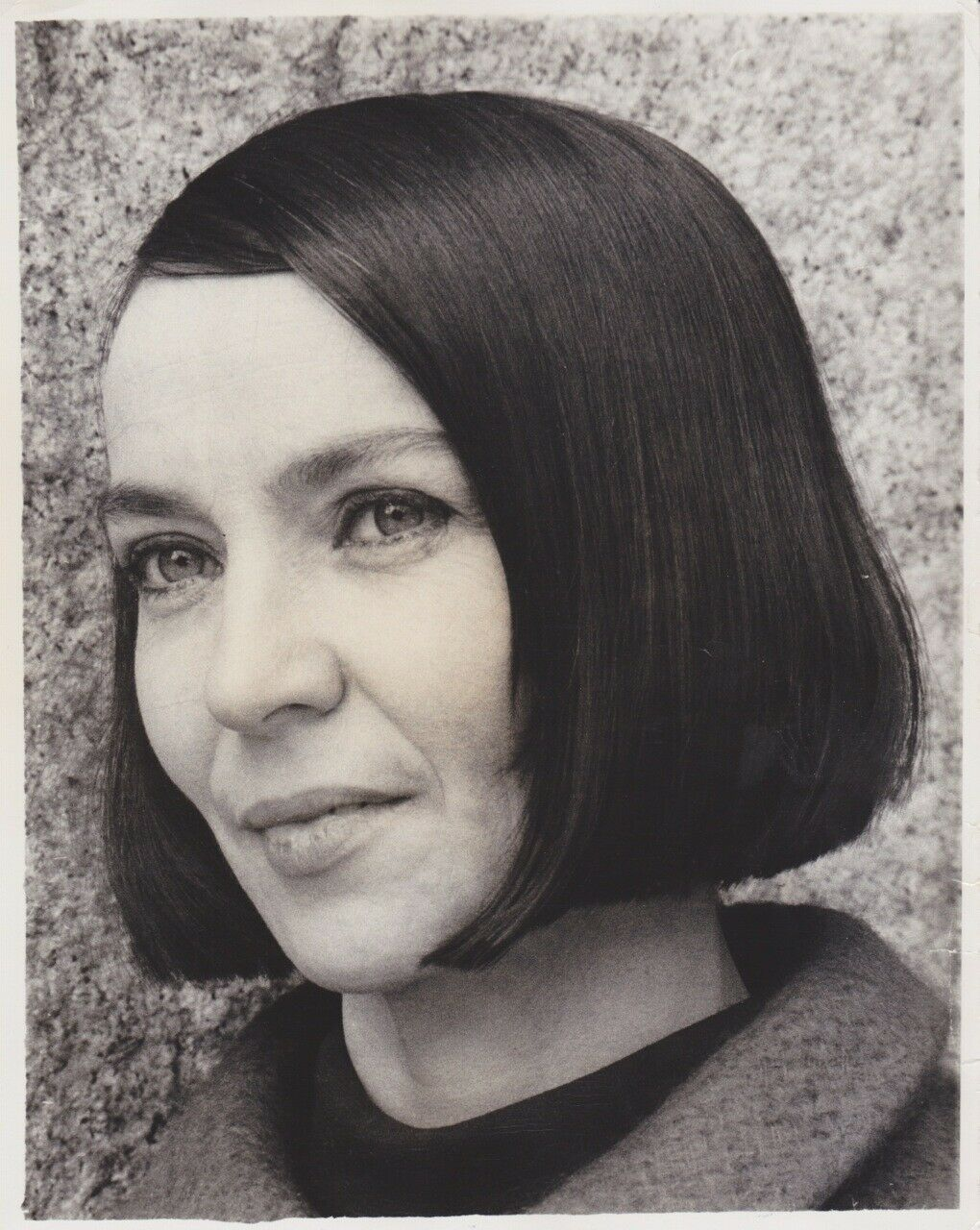
Helen Gallagher won for Pal Joey (1952)

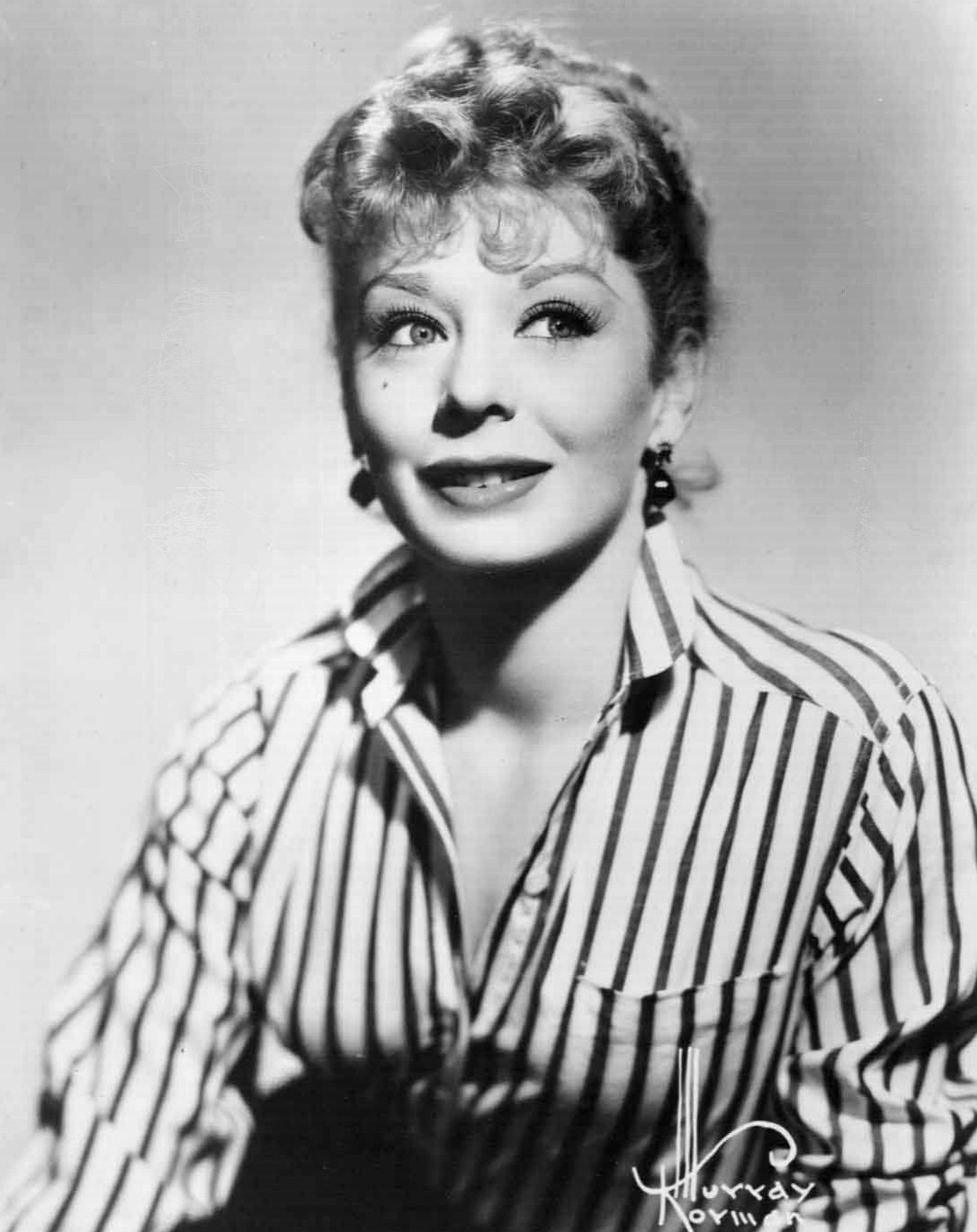
Gwen Verdon won for Can-Can (1954)

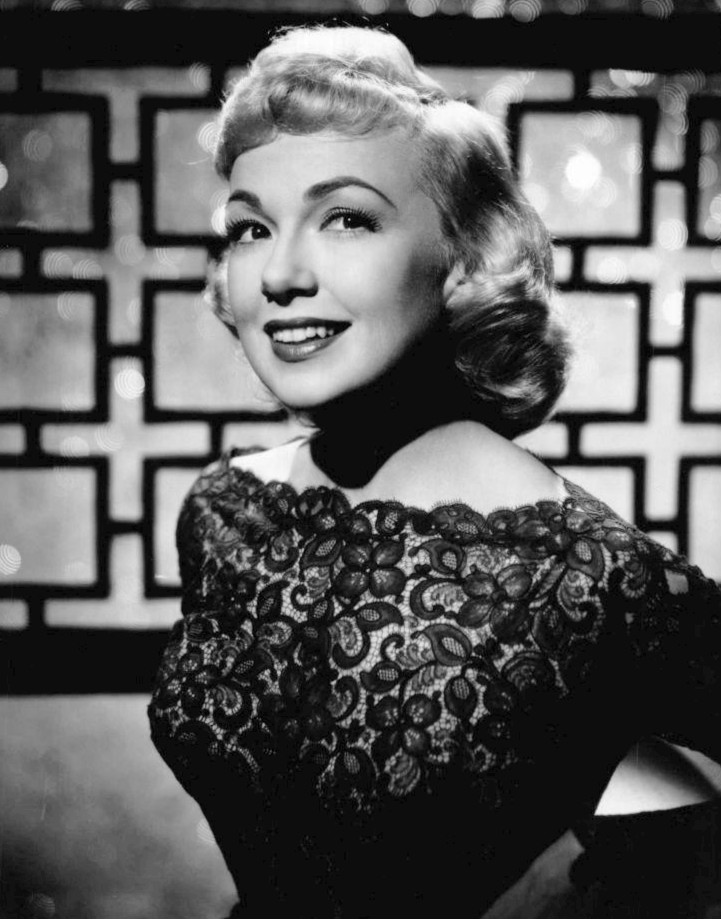
Edie Adams won for Lil' Abner (1957)

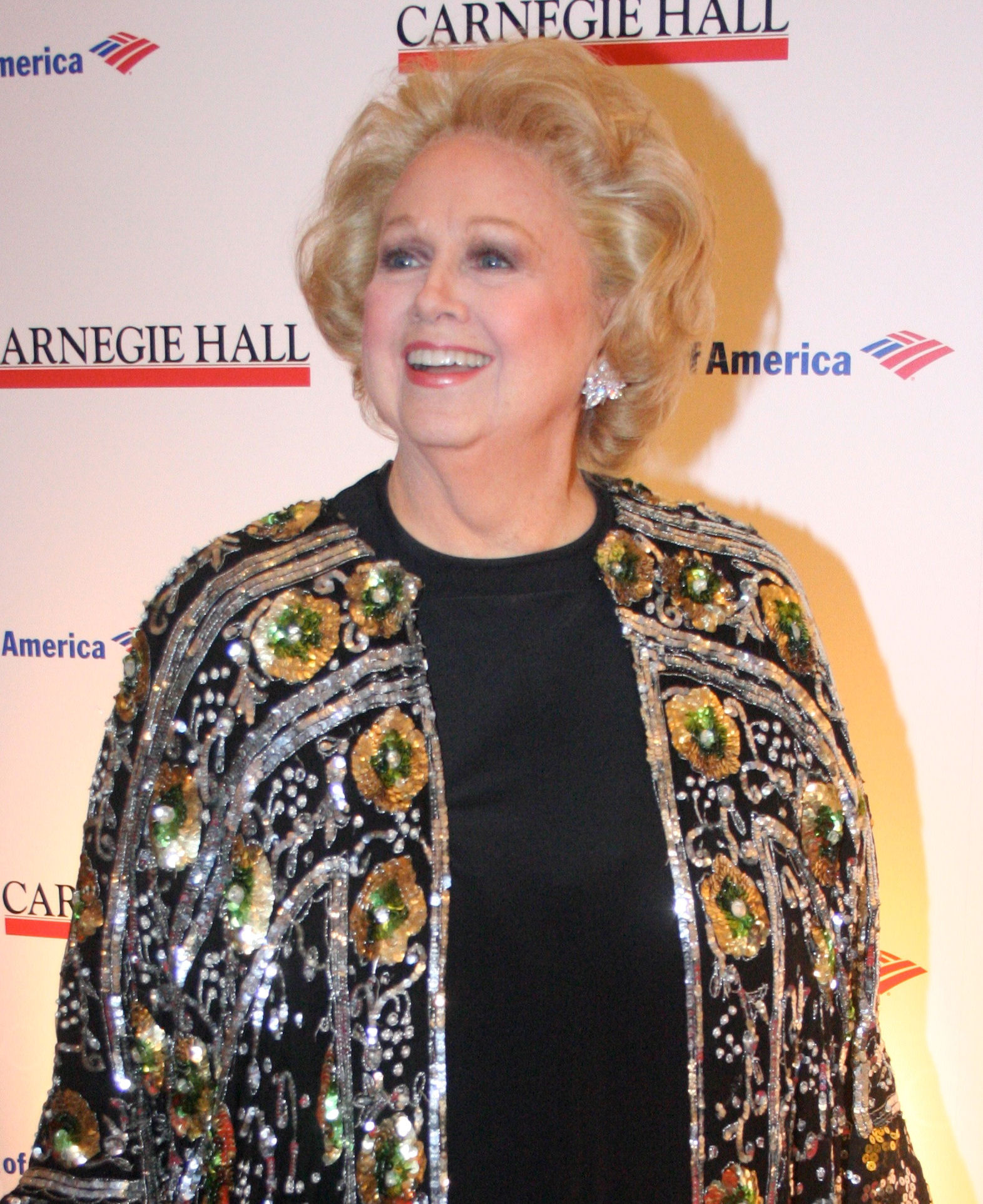
Barbara Cook won for The Music Man (1958)

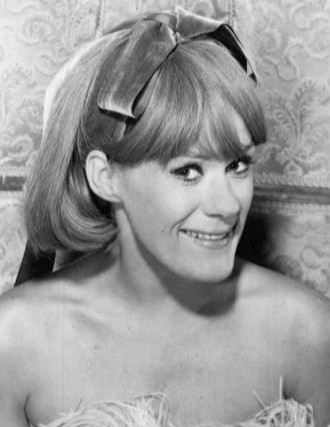
Tammy Grimes won for The Unsinkable Molly Brown (1961)

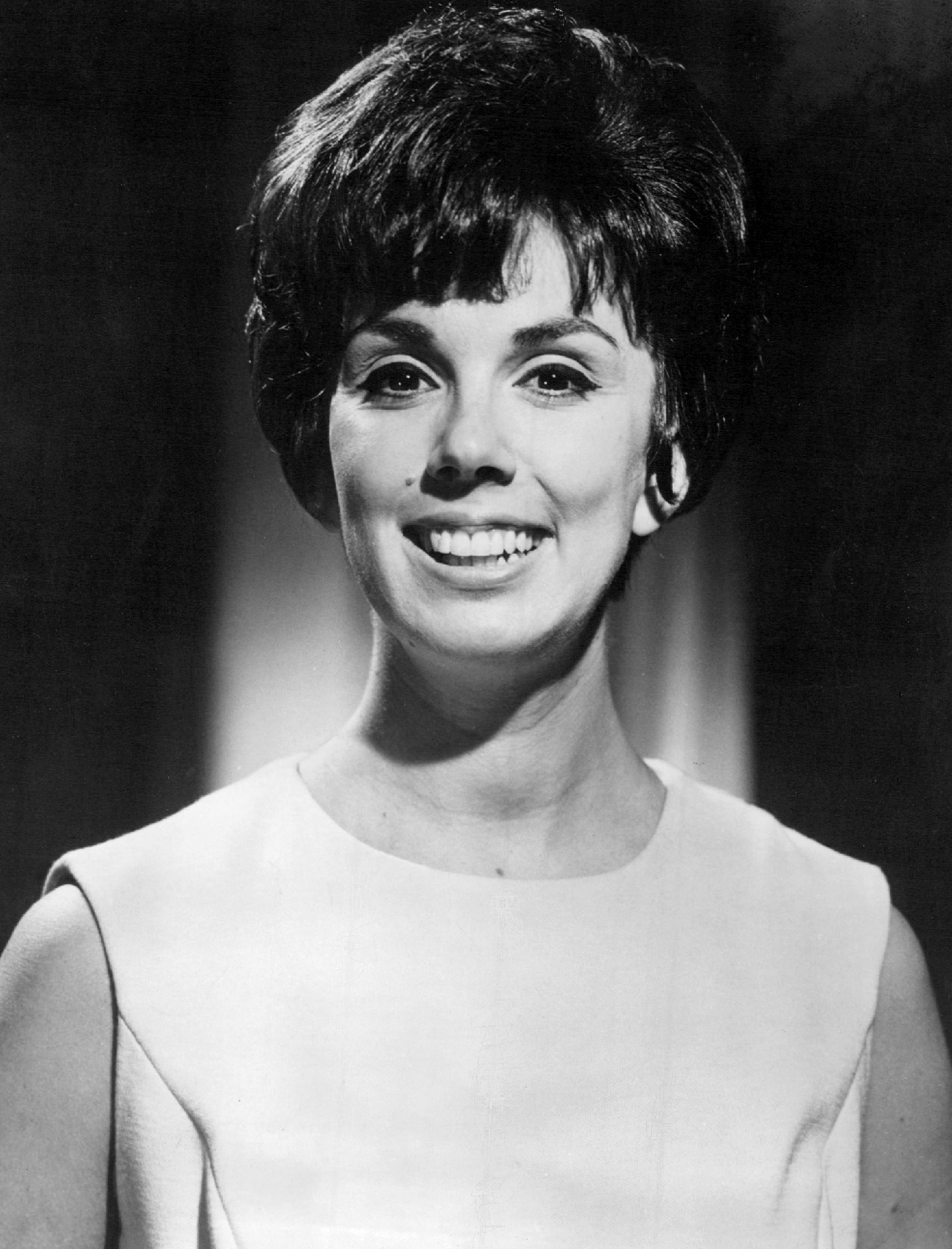
Phyllis Newman won for Subways Are for Sleeping (1962)

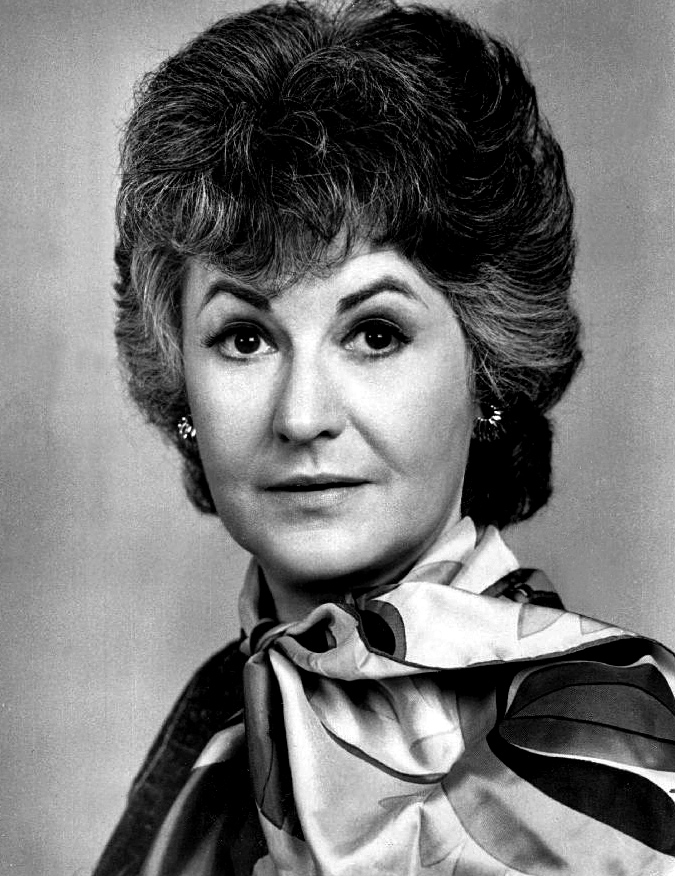
Bea Arthur won for Mame (1966)

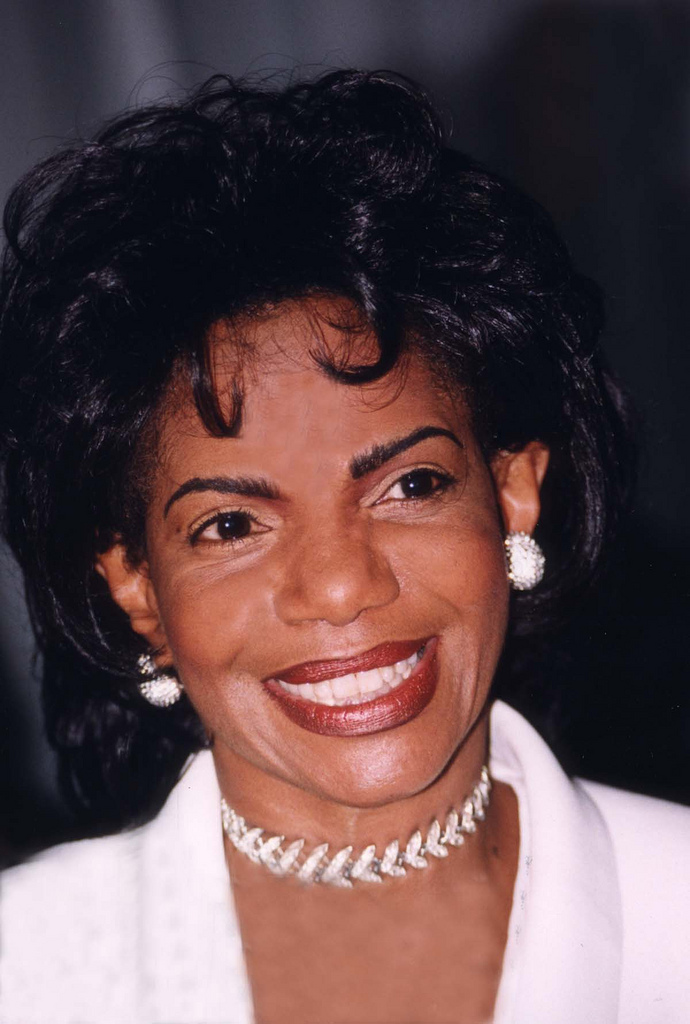
Melba Moore won for Purlie (1970)

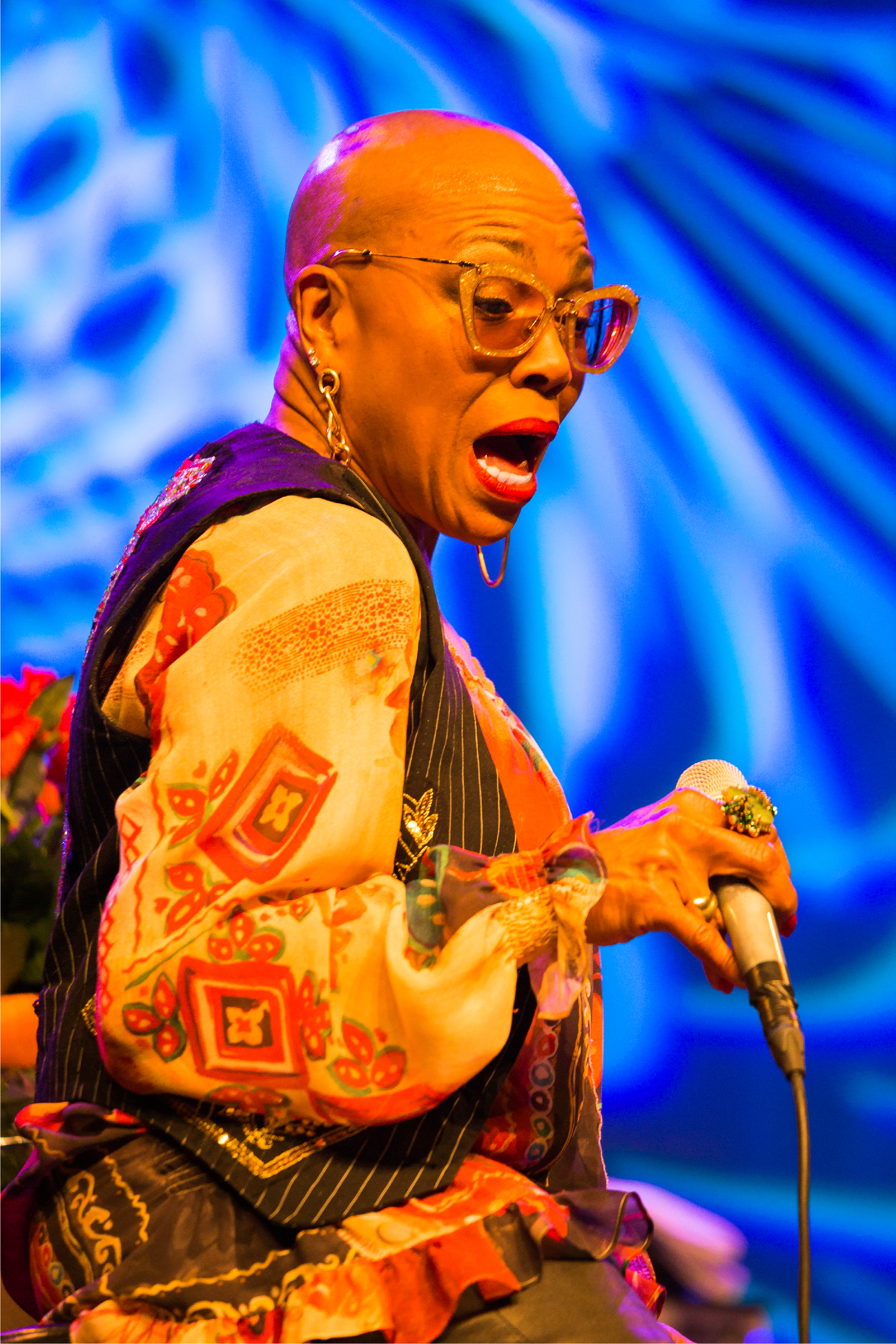
Dee Dee Bridgewater won for The Wiz (1975)

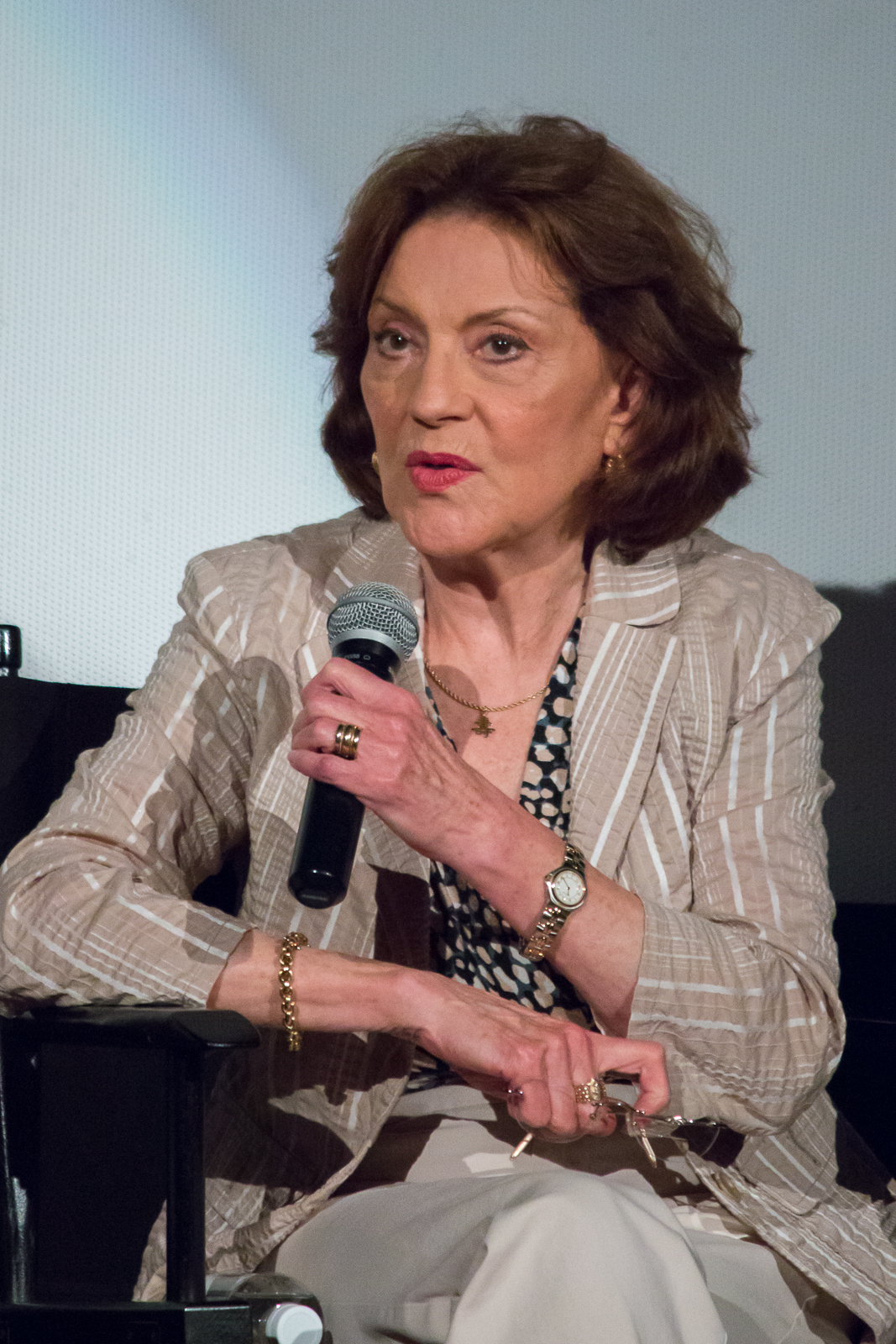
Kelly Bishop won for A Chorus Line (1976)

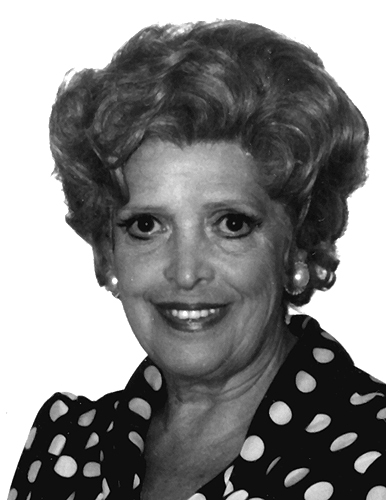
Marilyn Cooper won for Woman of the Year (1981)

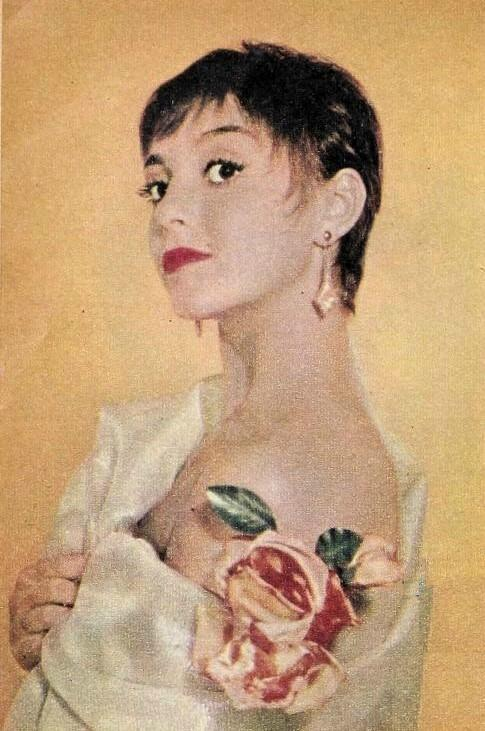
Liliane Montevecchi won for Nine (1982)

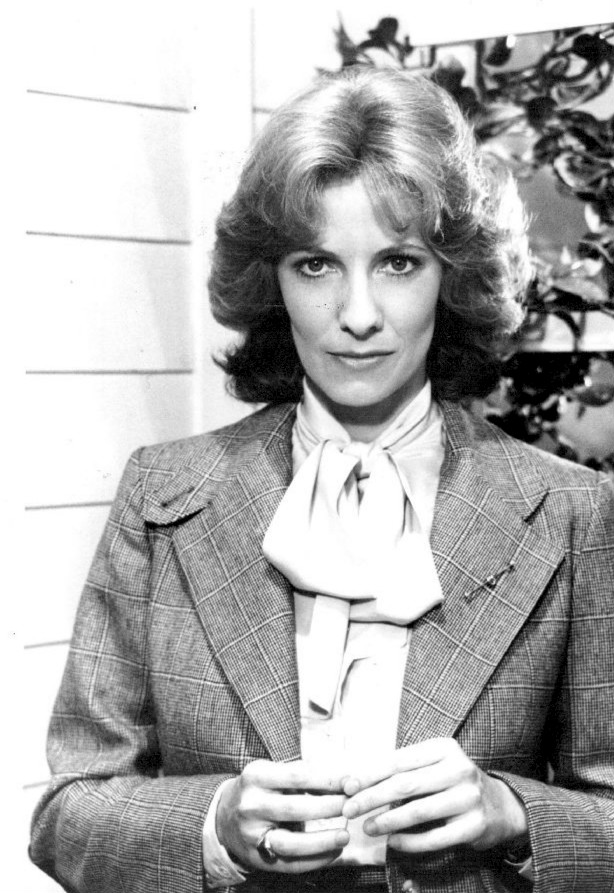
Betty Buckley won for Cats (1983)

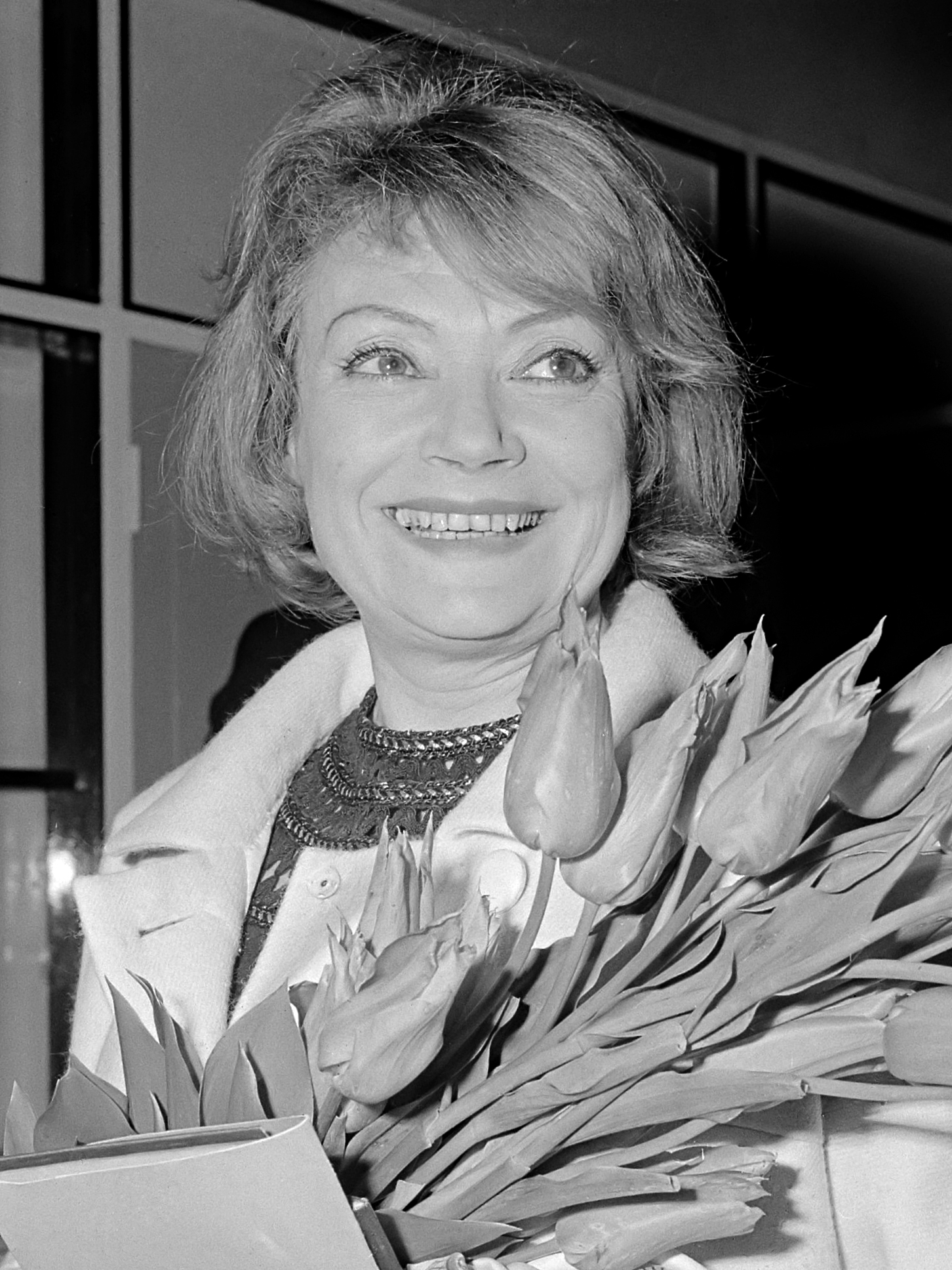
Lila Kedrova won for Zorba (1984)

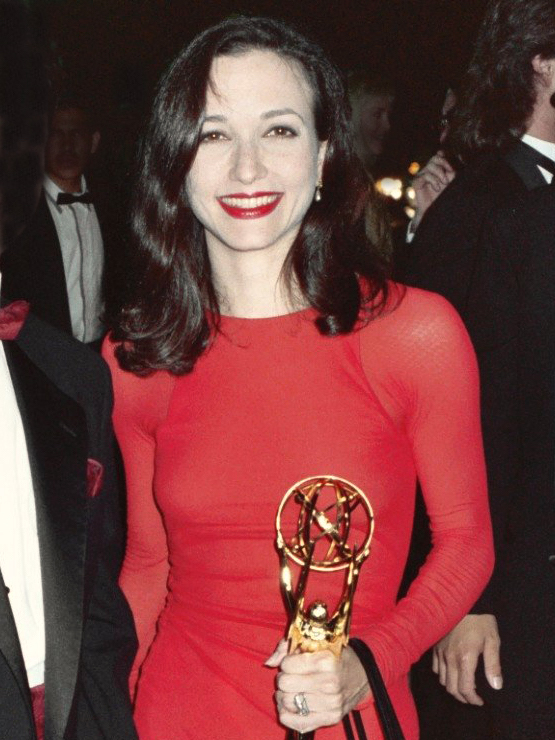
Bebe Neuwirth won for Sweet Charity (1986)

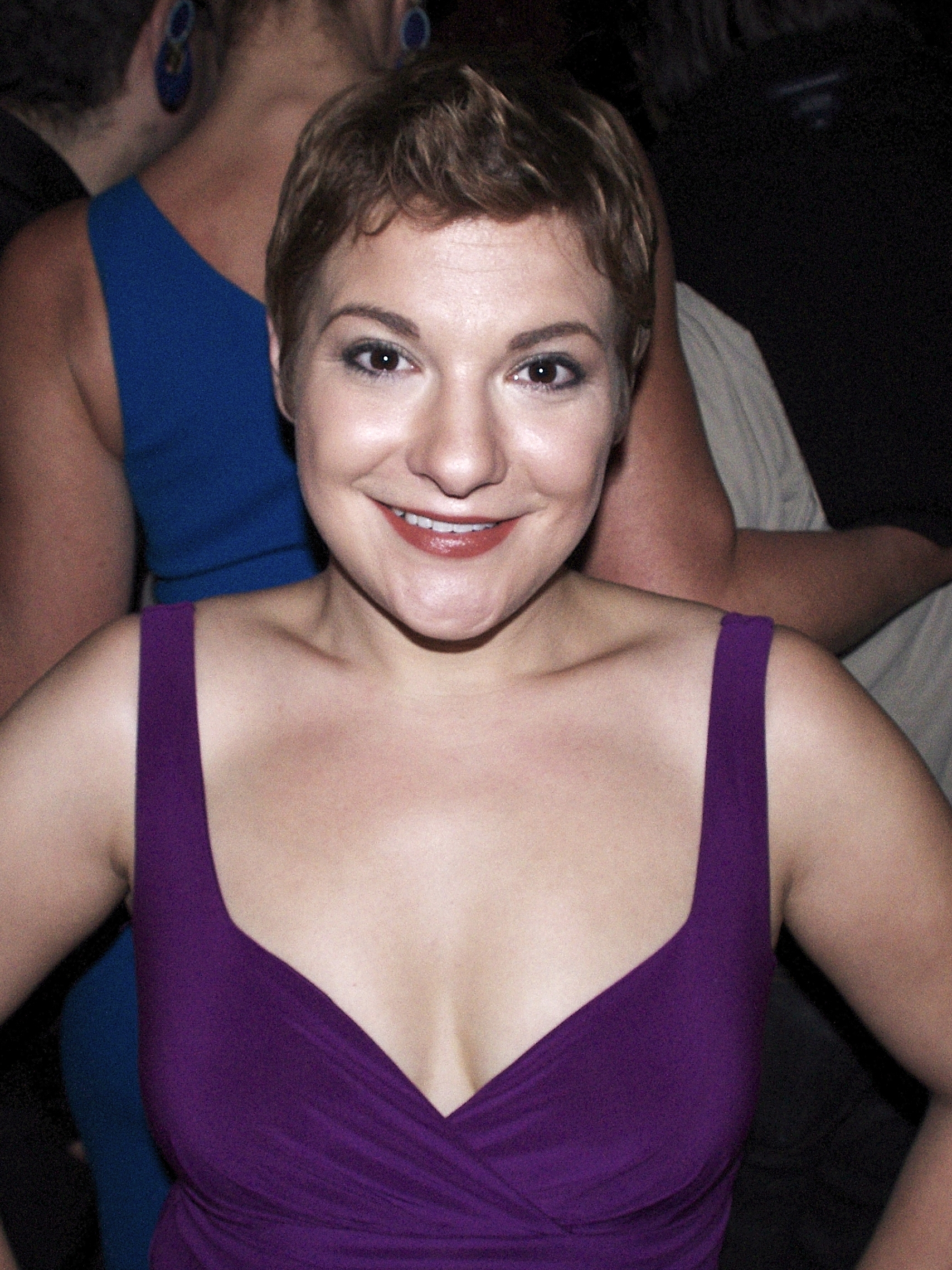
Daisy Eagan won for The Secret Garden (1991)

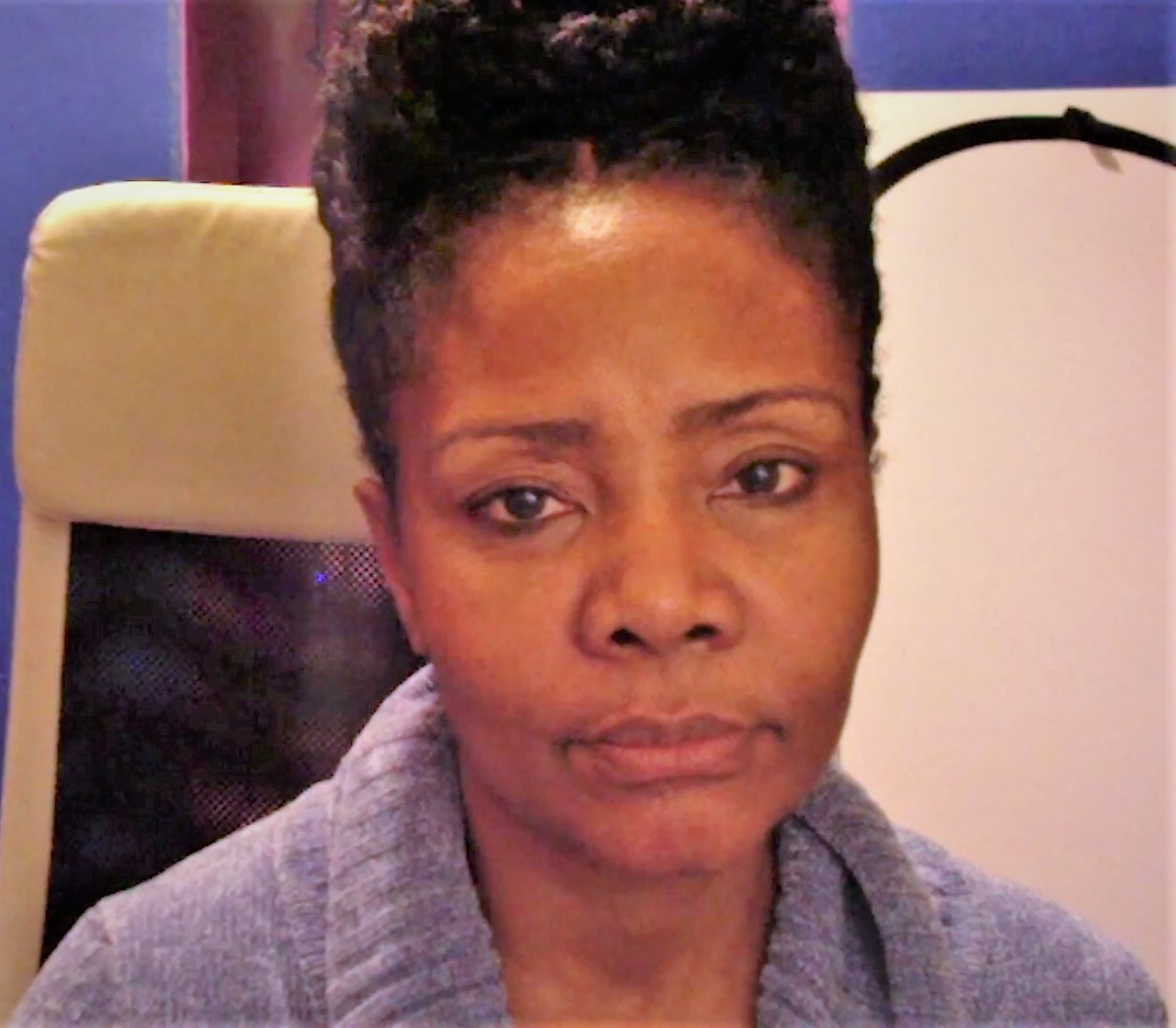
Tonya Pinkins won for Jelly's Last Jam (1992)

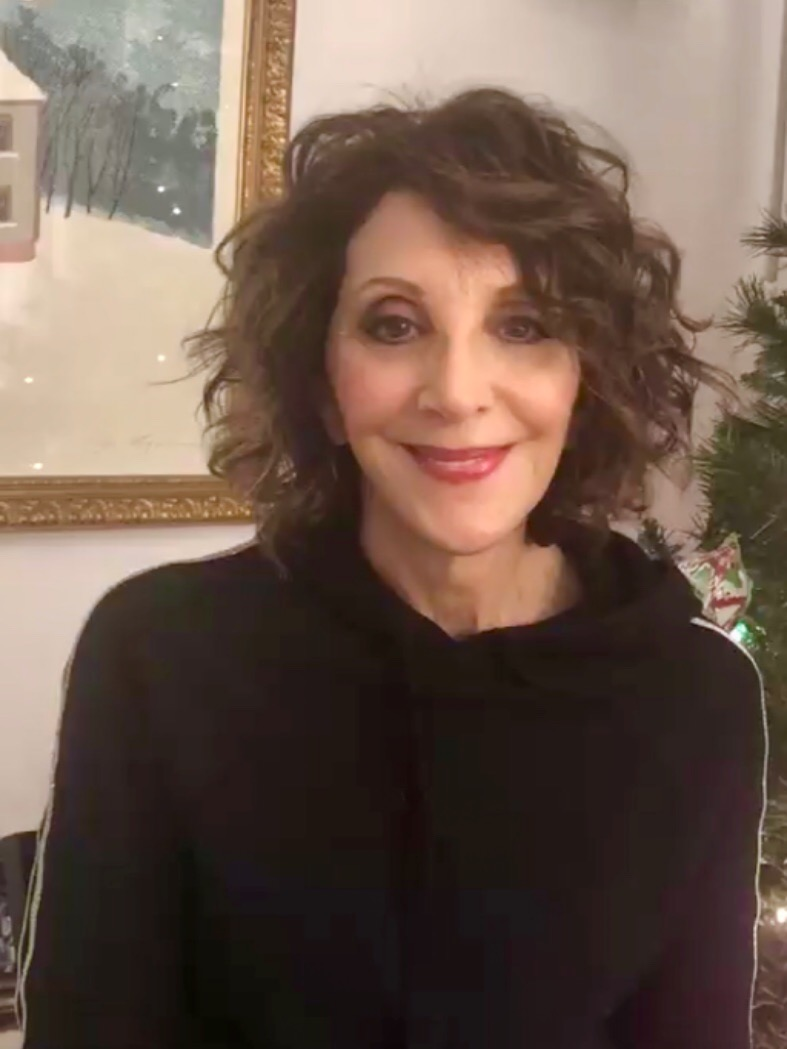
Andrea Martin won twice: for My Favorite Year (1993) and Pippin (2013)

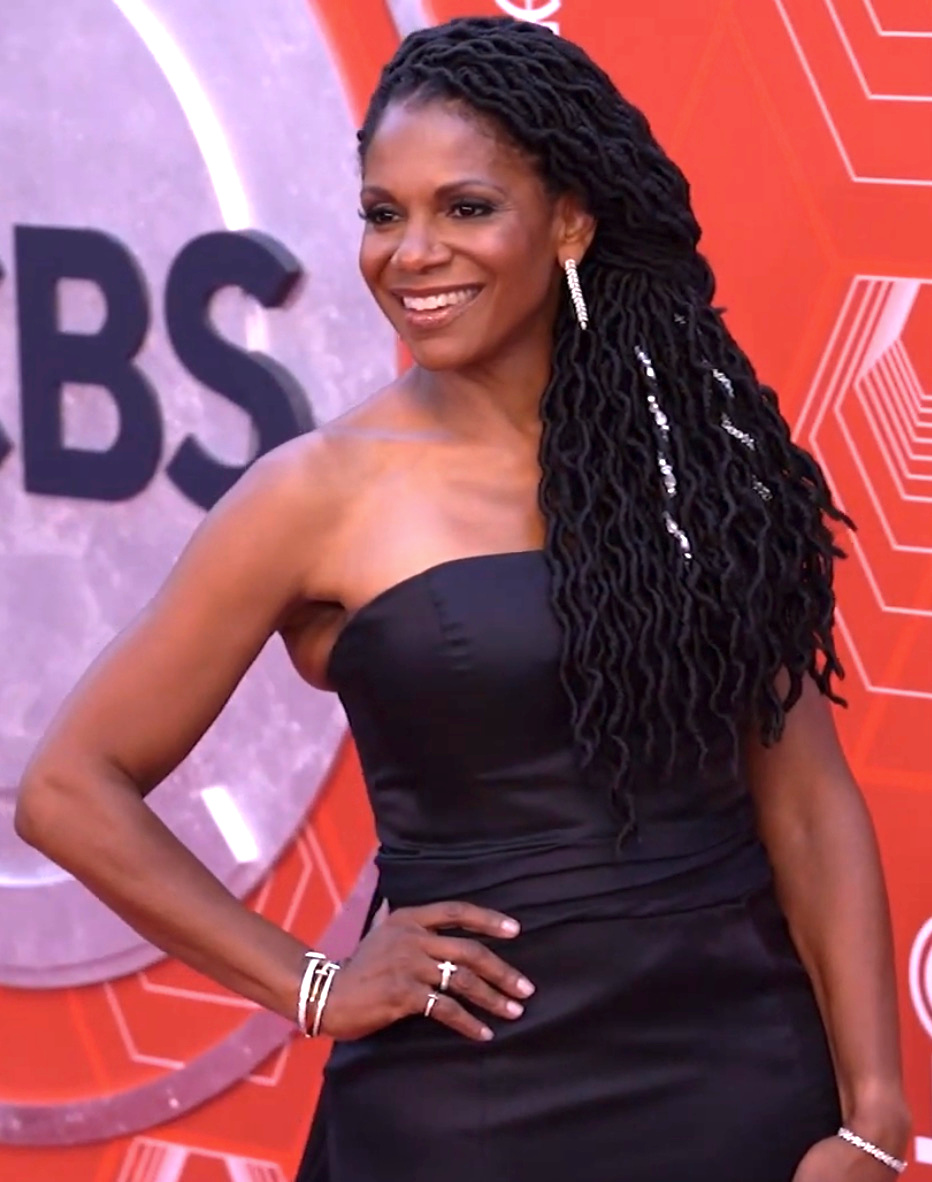
Audra McDonald won twice: for Carousel (1994) and Ragtime (1998)

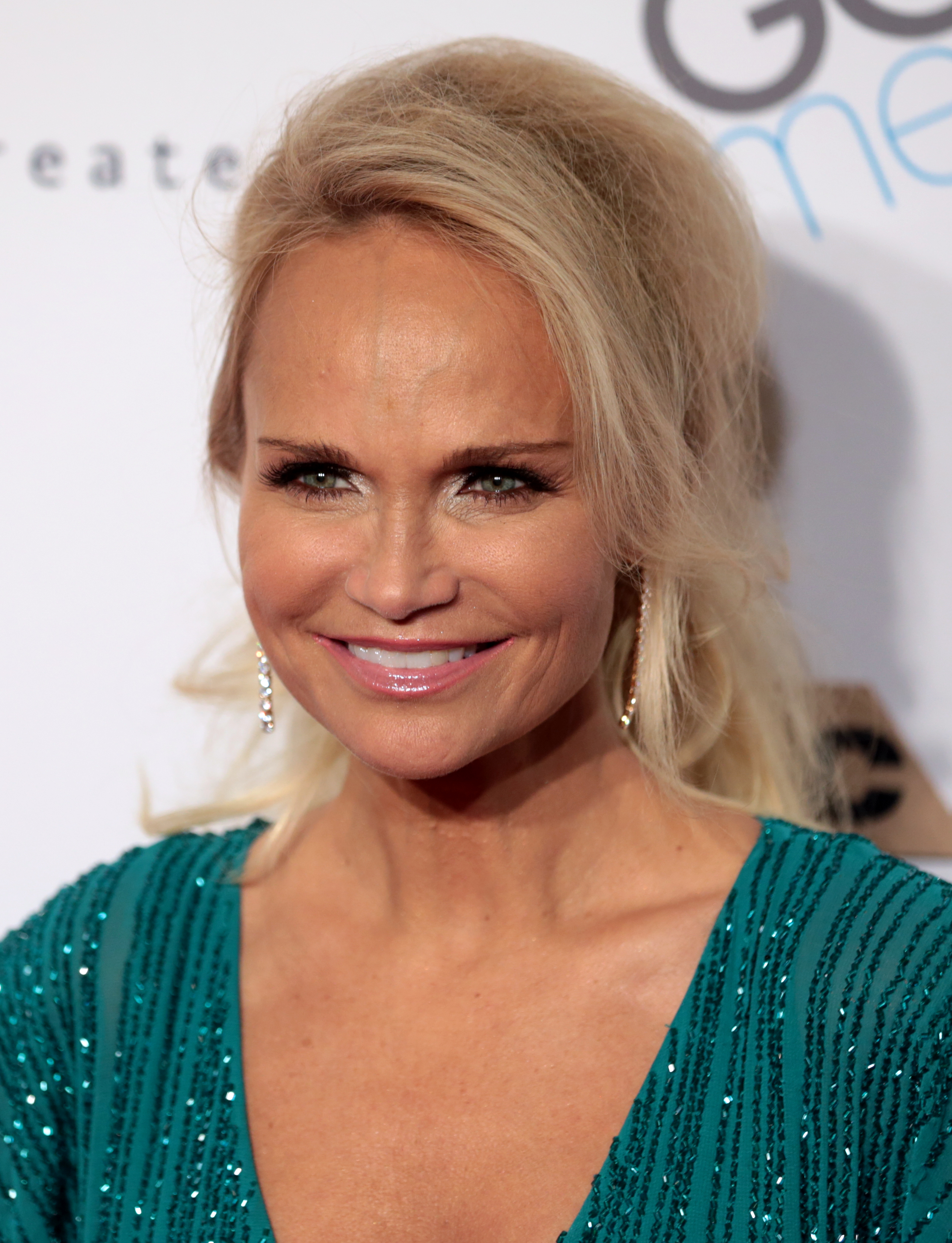
Kristin Chenoweth won for You're a Good Man, Charlie Brown (1999)

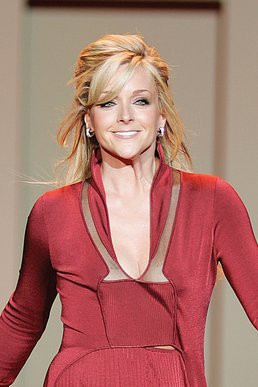
Jane Krakowski won for Nine (2003)

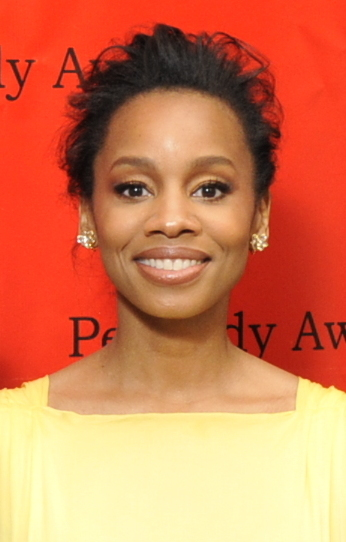
Anika Noni Rose won for Caroline, or Change (2004)

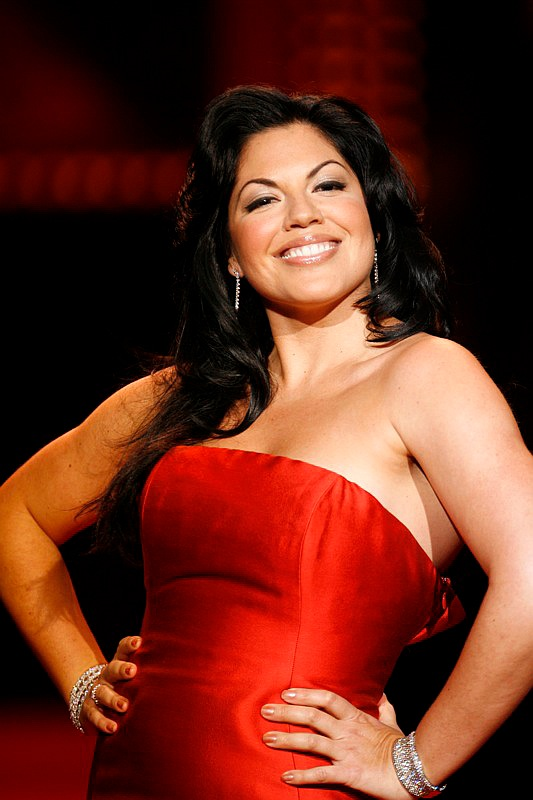
Sara Ramirez won for Spamalot (2005)

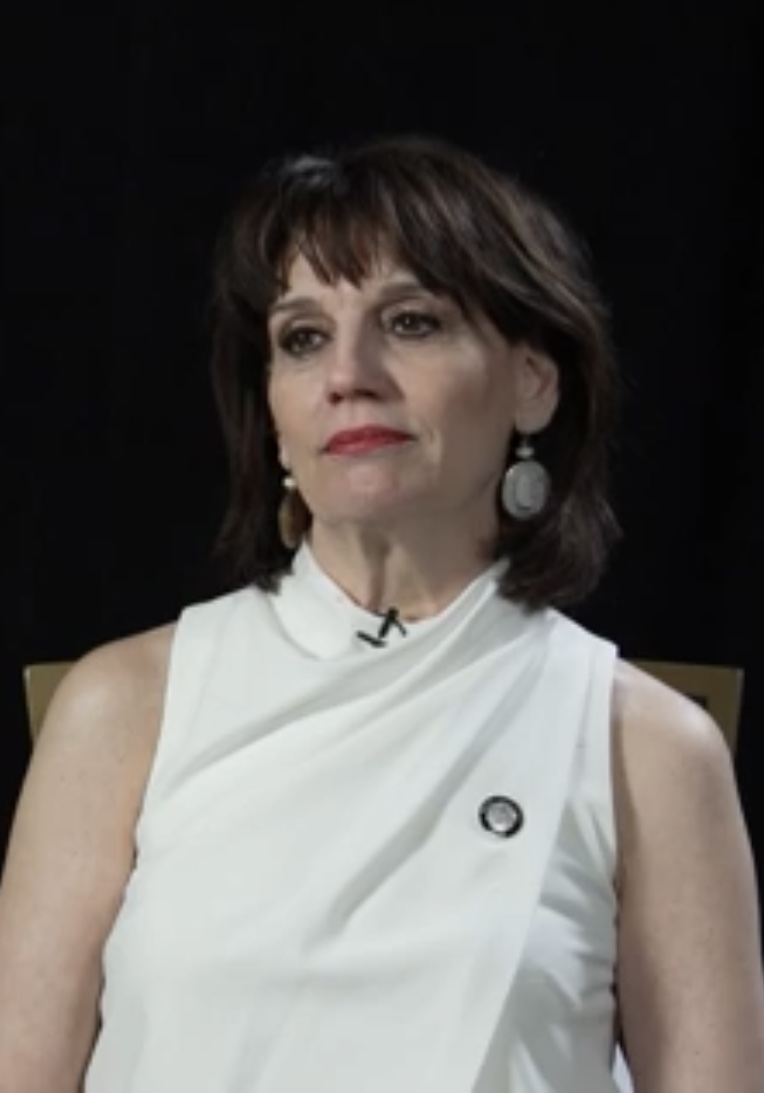
Beth Leavel won for The Drowsy Chaperone (2006)

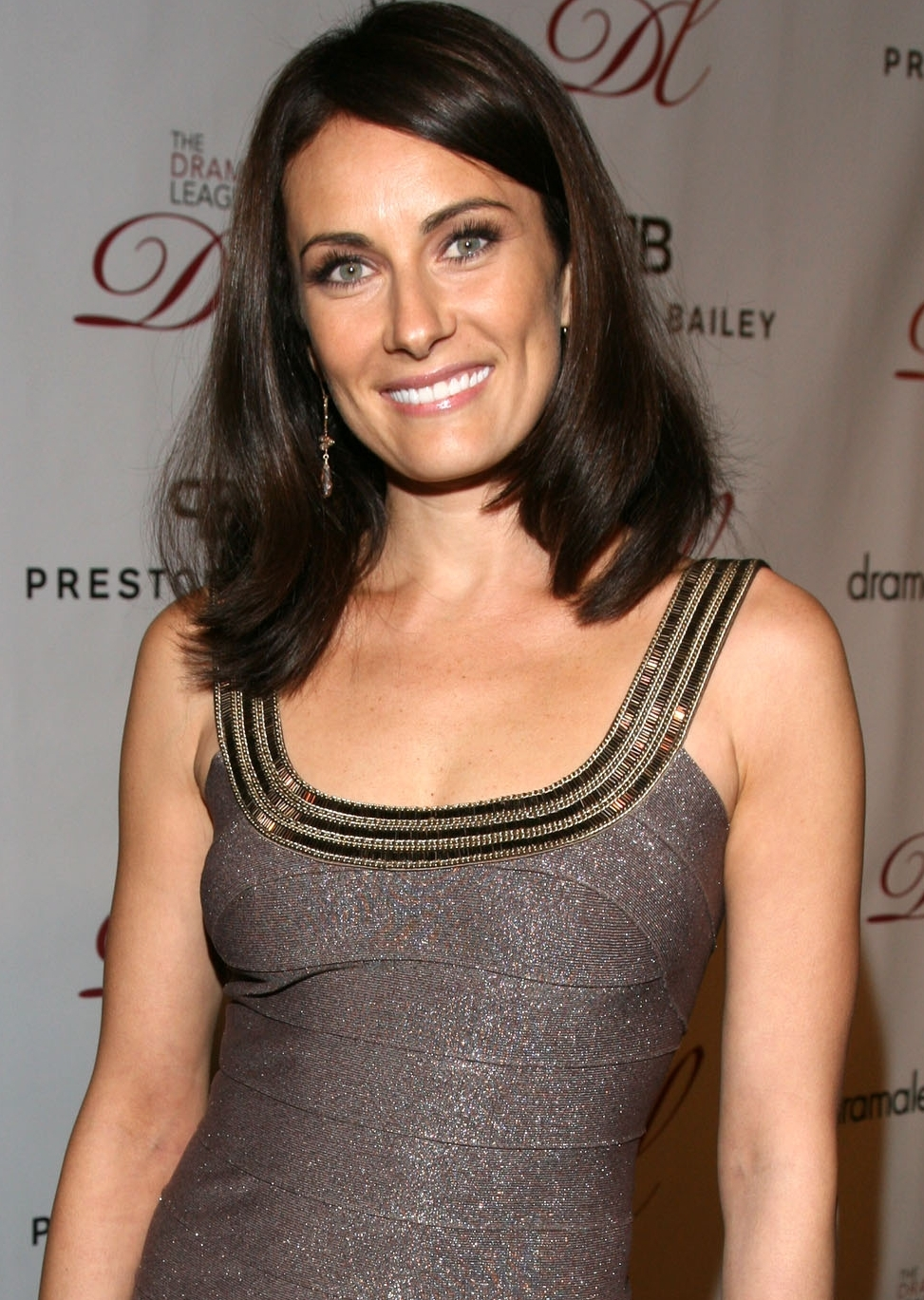
Laura Benanti won for Gypsy (2008)

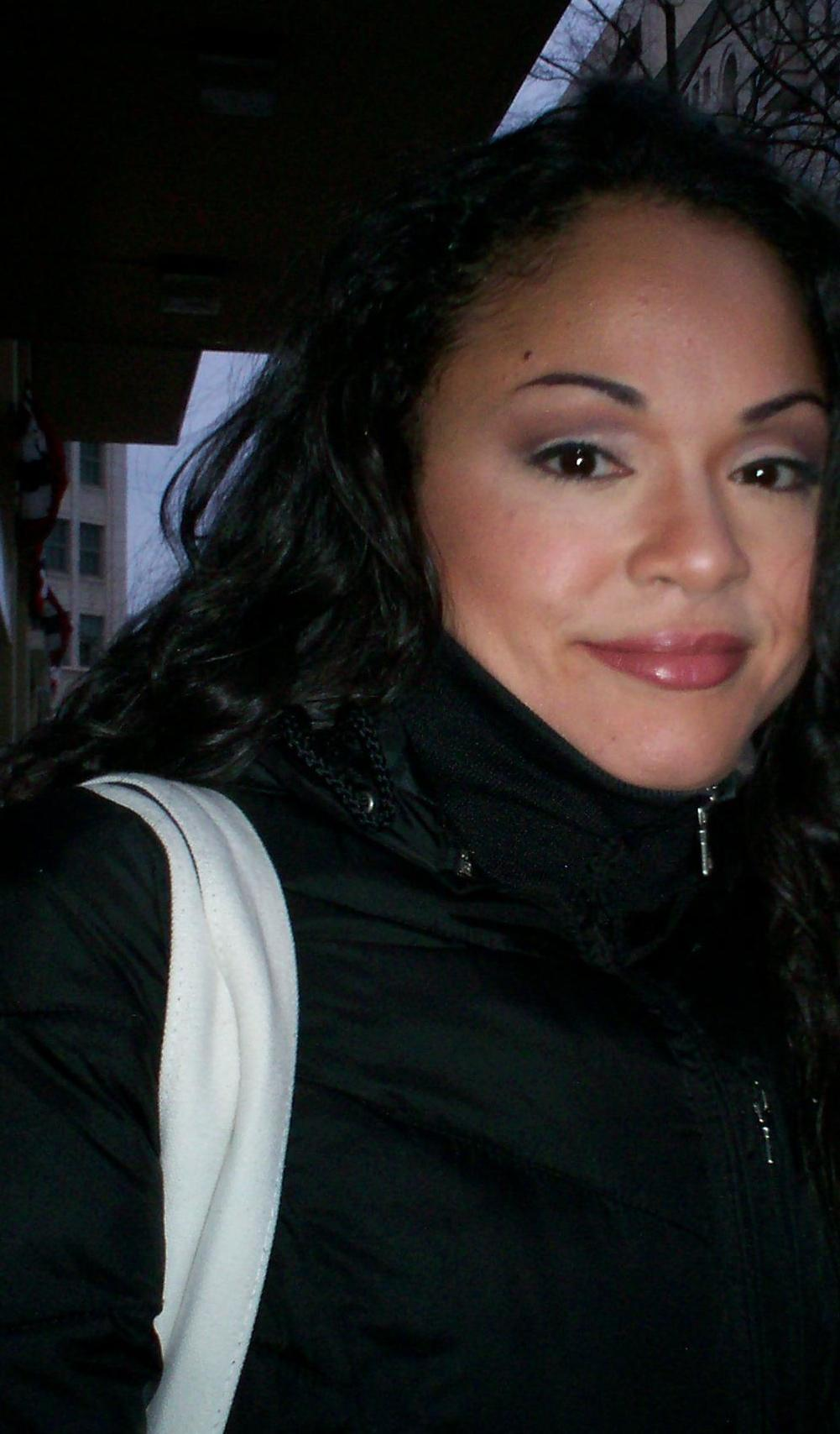
Karen Olivo won for West Side Story (2009)

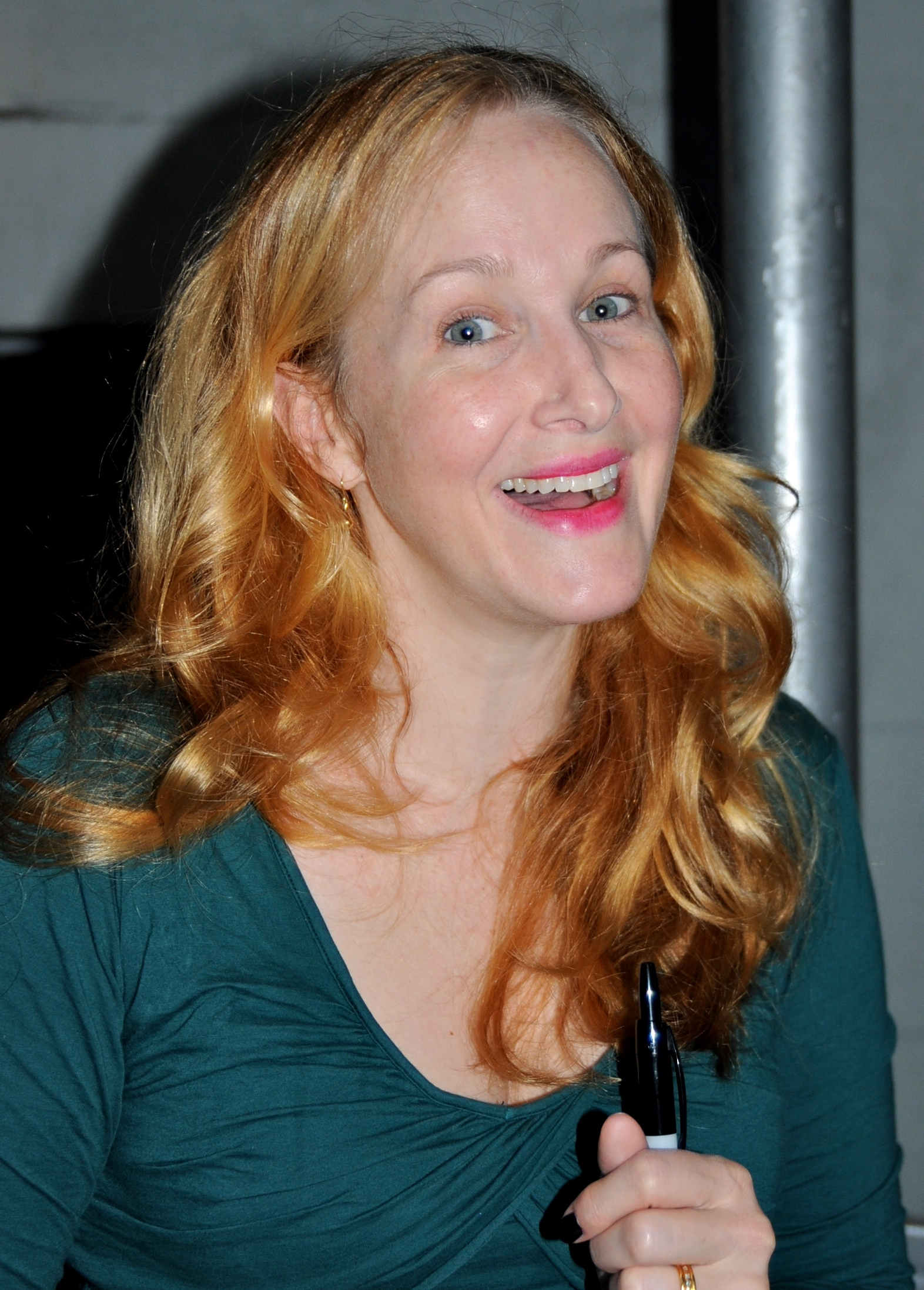
Katie Finneran won for Promises, Promises (2010)

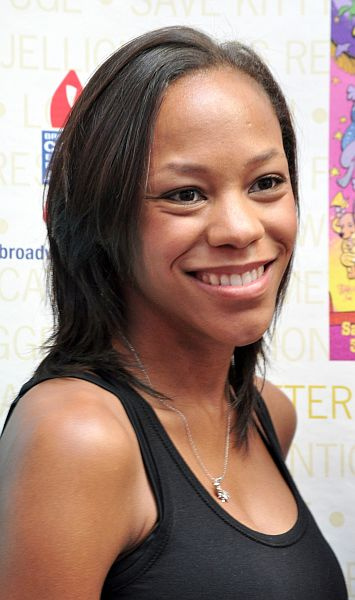
Nikki M. James won for The Book of Mormon (2011)

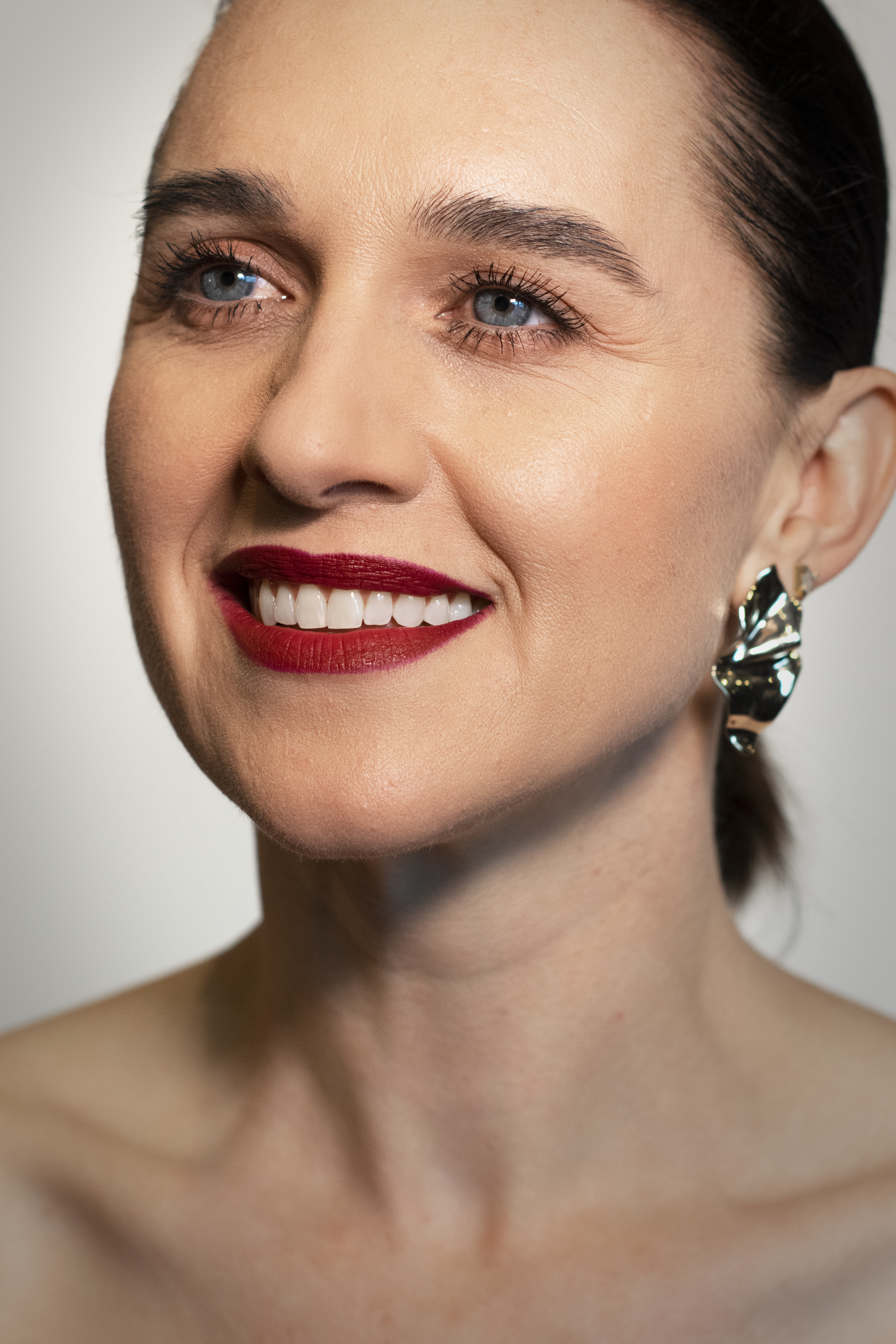
Lena Hall won for Hedwig and the Angry Inch (2014)

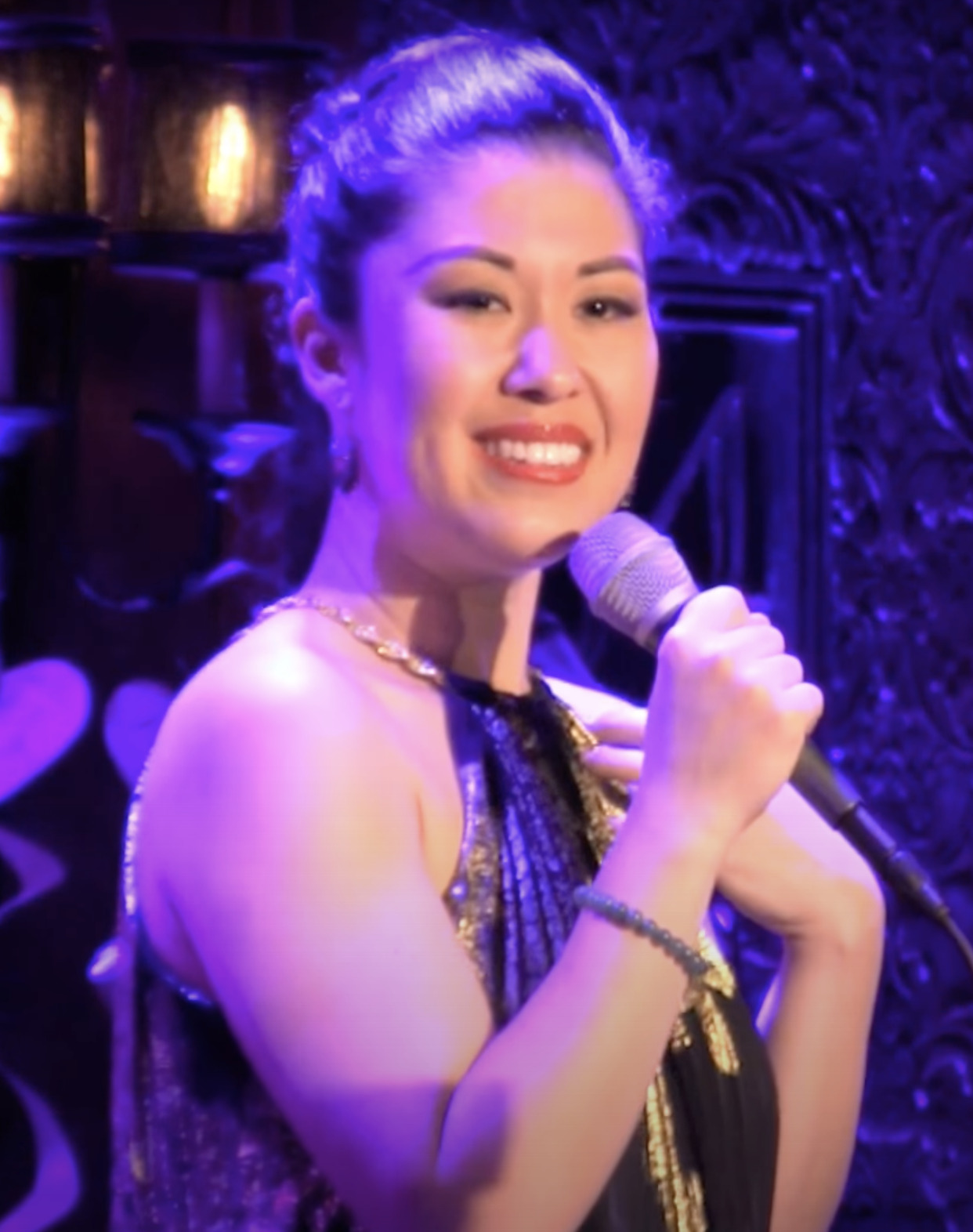
Ruthie Ann Miles won for The King and I (2015)

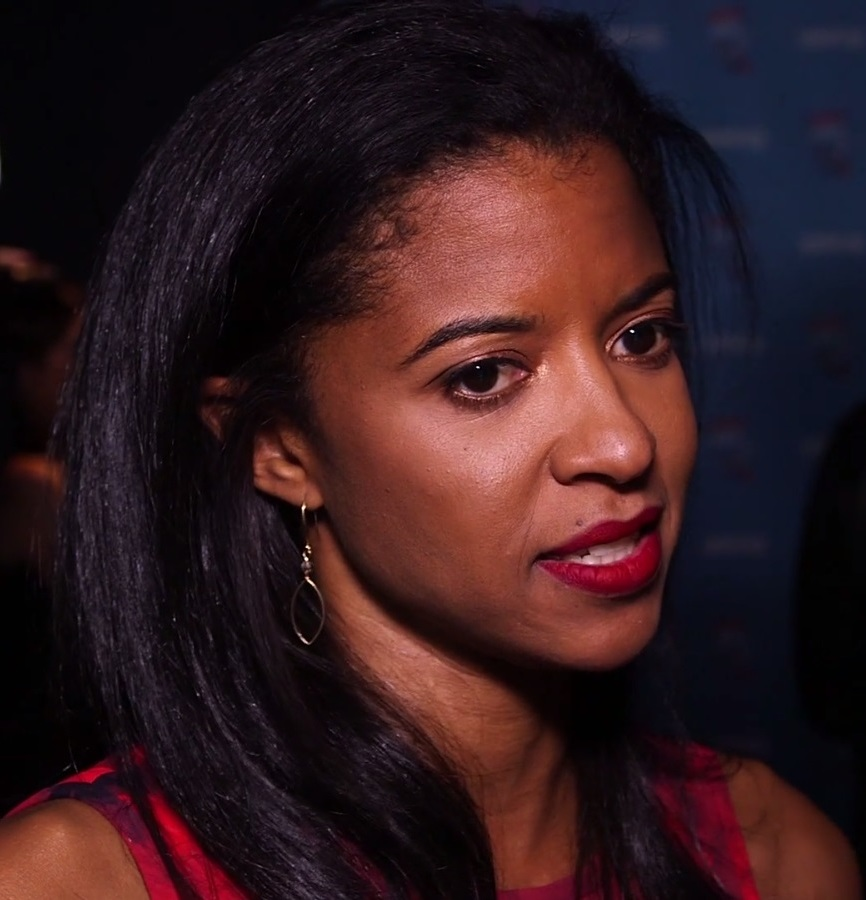
Renée Elise Goldsberry won for Hamilton (2016)

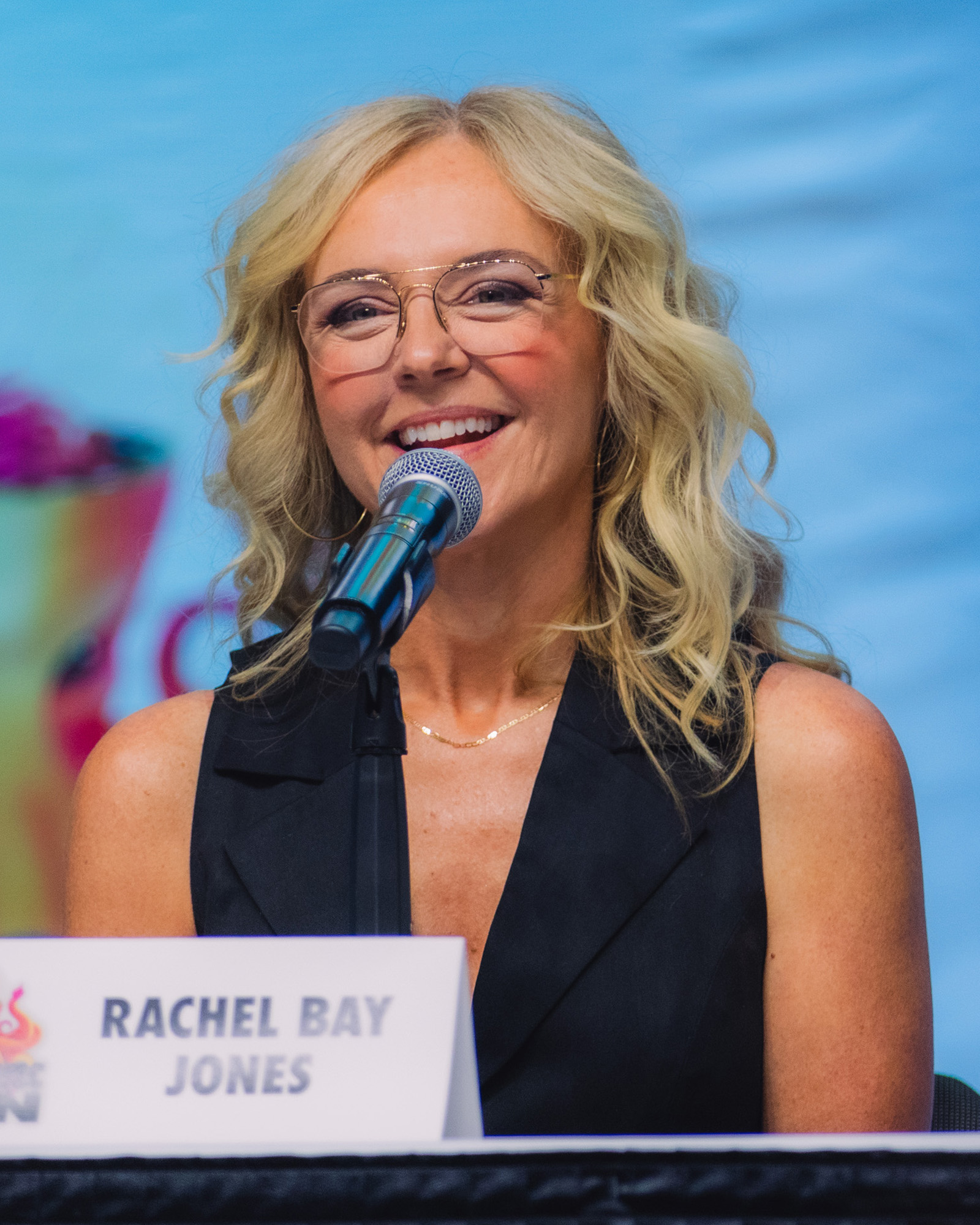
Rachel Bay Jones won for Dear Evan Hansen (2017)

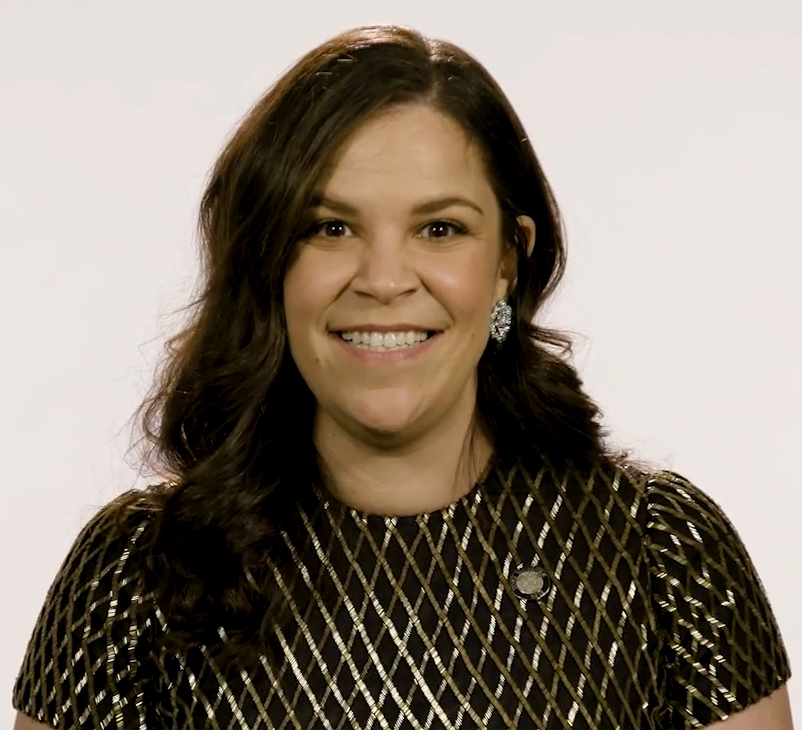
Lindsay Mendez won for Carousel (2018)

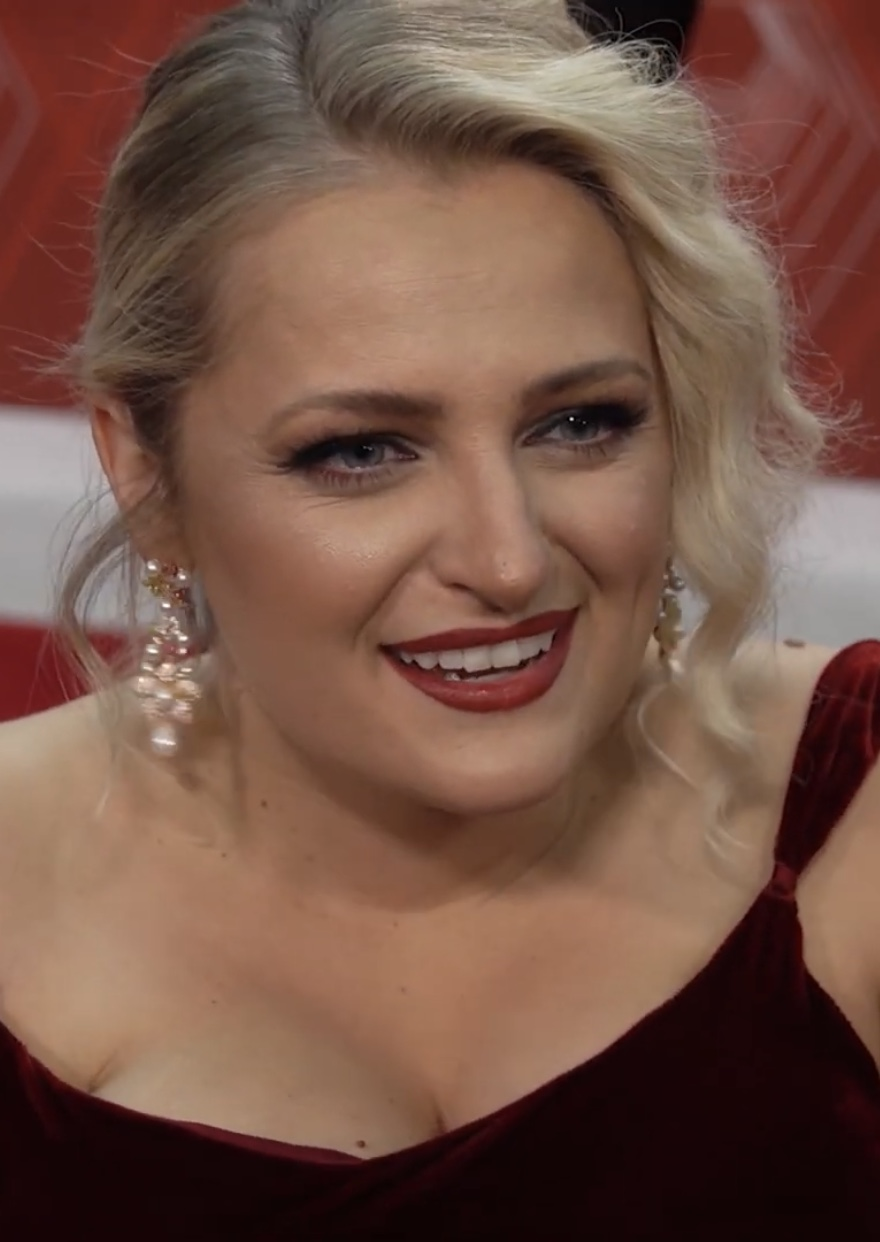
Ali Stroker won for Oklahoma! (2019)

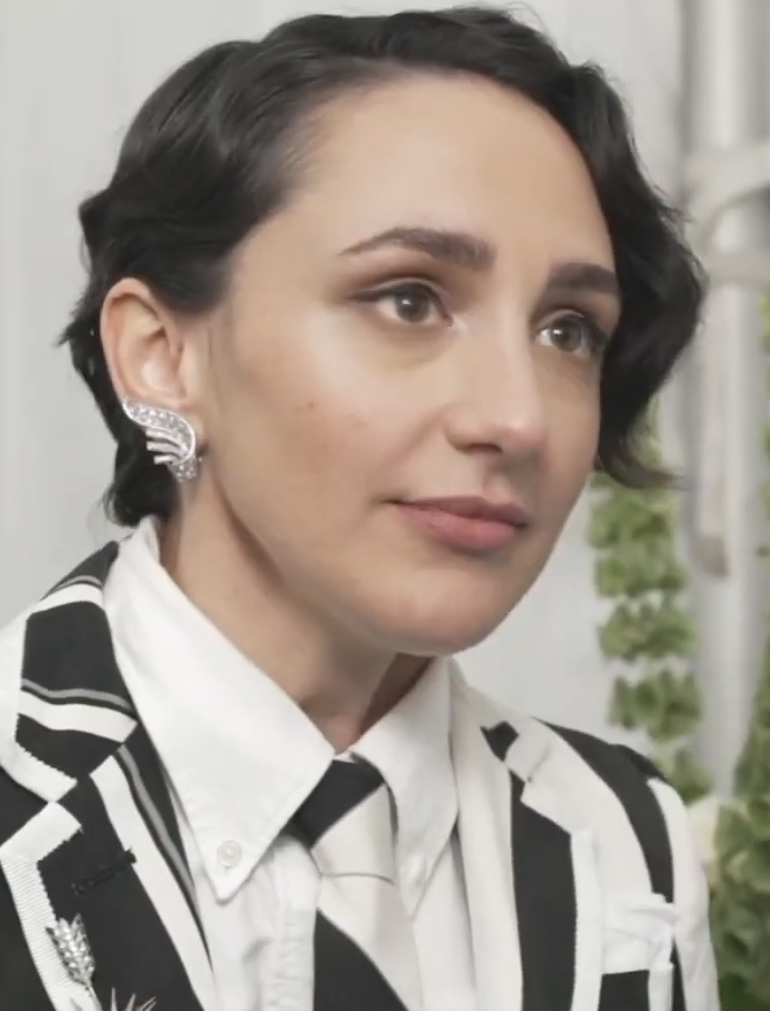
Lauren Patten won for Jagged Little Pill (2021)

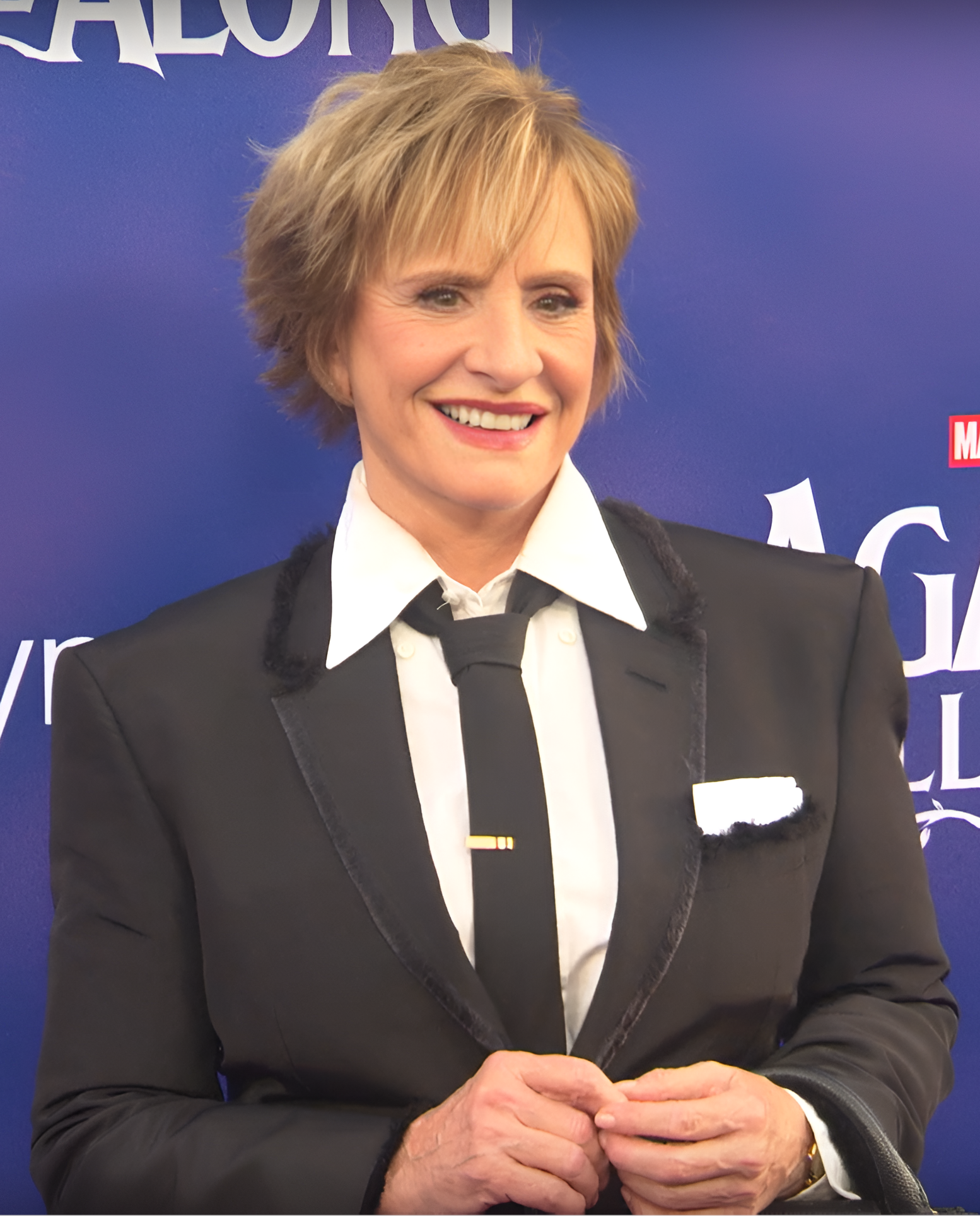
Patti LuPone won for Company (2022)

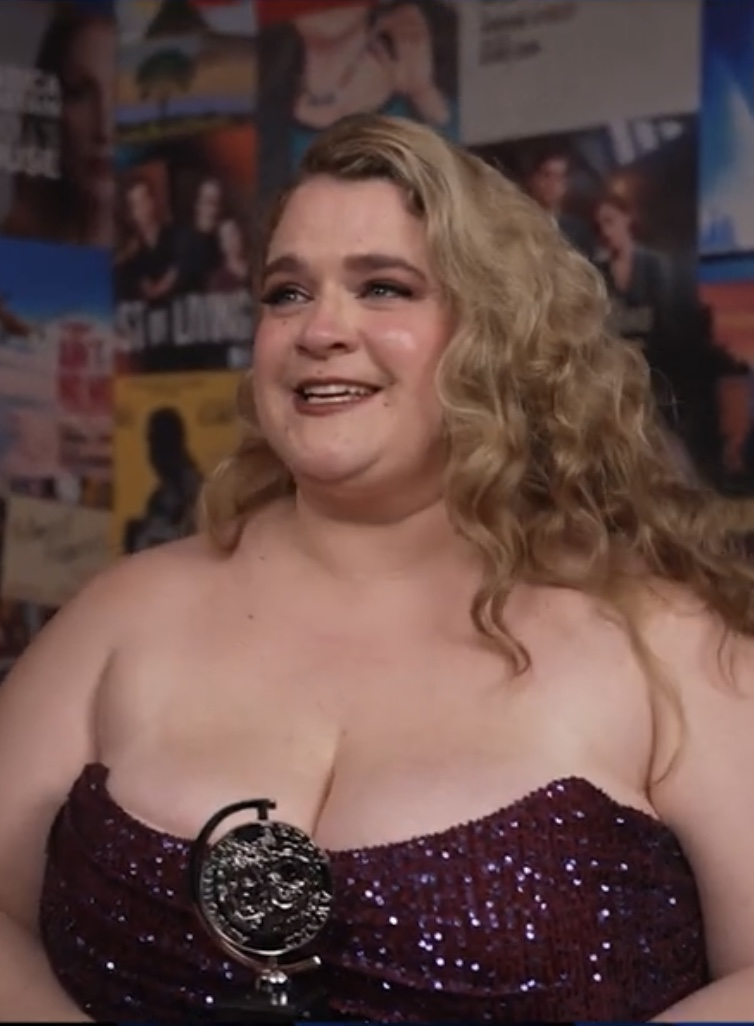
Bonnie Milligan won for Kimberly Akimbo (2023)

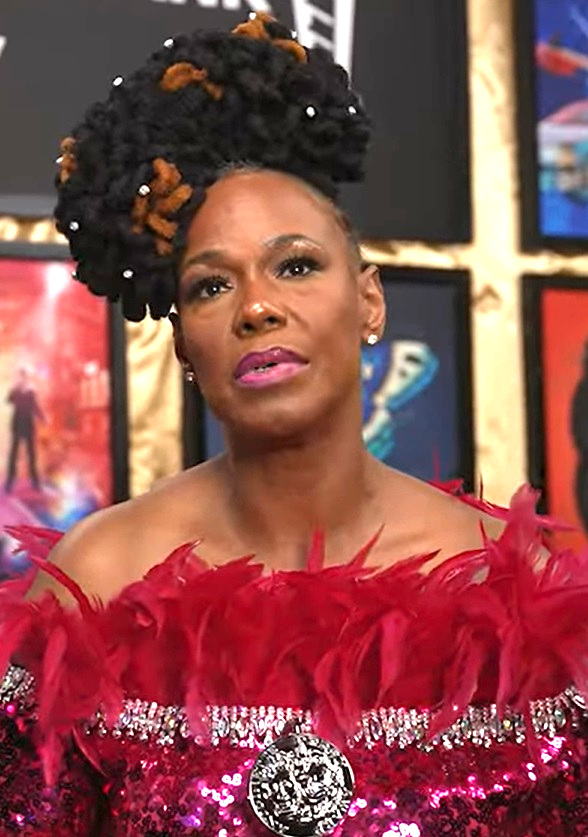
Kecia Lewis won for Hell's Kitchen (2024)

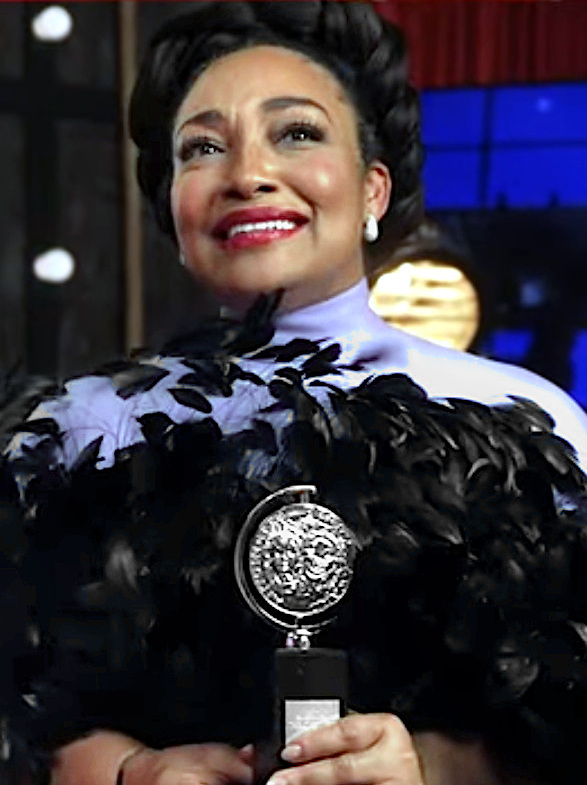
Natalie Venetia Belcon won for Buena Vista Social Club (2025)

=== 1950s ===
Year	Actor	Musical	Role(s)	Ref.
1950 (4th)
1950 (4th)	Juanita Hall	South Pacific	Bloody Mary	
1951 (5th)
1951 (5th)	Isabel Bigley	Guys and Dolls	Sarah Brown	
1952 (6th)
1952 (6th)	Helen Gallagher	Pal Joey	Gladys Bumps	
1953 (7th)
1953 (7th)	Sheila Bond	Wish You Were Here	Fay Fromkin	
1954 (8th)
1954 (8th)	Gwen Verdon	Can-Can	Claudine	
1955 (9th)
1955 (9th)	Carol Haney	The Pajama Game	Gladys Hotchkiss	
1956 (10th)
1956 (10th)	Lotte Lenya	The Threepenny Opera	Jenny Diver	
1956 (10th)	Rae Allen	Damn Yankees	Gloria Thorpe	
1956 (10th)	Pat Carroll	Catch a Star!	Various Characters	
1956 (10th)	Judy Tyler	Pipe Dream	Suzy	
1957 (11th)
1957 (11th)	Edie Adams	Lil' Abner	Daisy Mae	
1957 (11th)	Virginia Gibson	Happy Hunting	Beth Livingstone	
1957 (11th)	Irra Petina	Candide	The Old Lady / Madame Sofronia	
1957 (11th)	Jo Sullivan Loesser	The Most Happy Fella	Rosabella	
1958 (12th)
1958 (12th)	Barbara Cook	The Music Man	Marian Paroo	
1958 (12th)	Susan Johnson	Oh, Captain!	Mae	
1958 (12th)	Carol Lawrence	West Side Story	Maria	
1958 (12th)	Jackie McKeever	Oh, Captain!	Mrs. Maud St.James	
1958 (12th)	Josephine Premice	Jamaica	Ginger	
1959 (13th)
1959 (13th)	Pat Stanley	Goldilocks	Lois Lee	
1959 (13th)	Julienne Marie	Whoop-Up	Mary Champlain	

=== 1960s ===
Year	Actor	Musical	Role(s)	Ref.
1960 (14th)
1960 (14th)	Patricia Neway	The Sound of Music	The Mother Abbess	
1960 (14th)	Sandra Church	Gypsy	Louise	
1960 (14th)	Pert Kelton	Greenwillow	Gramma Briggs	
1960 (14th)	Lauri Peters and Kathy Dunn, Evanna Lien, Mary Susan Locke, Marilyn Robers, William Snowden and Joseph Stewart	The Sound of Music	Liesl von Trapp and the other six von Trapp children	
1961 (15th)
1961 (15th)	Tammy Grimes	The Unsinkable Molly Brown	Molly Tobin	
1961 (15th)	Nancy Dussault	Do Re Mi	Tilda Mullen	
1961 (15th)	Chita Rivera	Bye Bye Birdie	Rosie Alvarez	
1962 (16th)
1962 (16th)	Phyllis Newman	Subways Are for Sleeping	Martha Vail	
1962 (16th)	Elizabeth Allen	The Gay Life	Magda	
1962 (16th)	Barbara Harris	From the Second City	Various Characters	
1962 (16th)	Barbra Streisand	I Can Get It for You Wholesale	Miss Marmelstein	
1963 (17th)
1963 (17th)	Anna Quayle	Stop the World – I Want to Get Off	Evie / Anya / Ilse / Ginnie	
1963 (17th)	Ruth Kobart	A Funny Thing Happened on the Way to the Forum	Domina	
1963 (17th)	Virginia Martin	Little Me	Young Belle Poitrine	
1963 (17th)	Louise Troy	Tovarich	Natalia Mayovskaya	
1964 (18th)
1964 (18th)	Tessie O'Shea	The Girl Who Came to Supper	Ada Cockle	
1964 (18th)	Julienne Marie	Foxy	Celia	
1964 (18th)	Kay Medford	Funny Girl	Rose Brice	
1964 (18th)	Louise Troy	High Spirits	Ruth Condomine	
1965 (19th)
1965 (19th)	Maria Karnilova	Fiddler on the Roof	Golde	
1965 (19th)	Luba Lisa	I Had a Ball	Addie	
1965 (19th)	Carrie Nye	Half a Sixpence	Helen Walsingham	
1965 (19th)	Barbara Windsor	Oh, What a Lovely War!	Various Characters	
1966 (20th)
1966 (20th)	Bea Arthur	Mame	Vera Charles	
1966 (20th)	Helen Gallagher	Sweet Charity	Nickie	
1966 (20th)	Patricia Marand	It's a Bird...It's a Plane...It's Superman	Lois Lane	
1966 (20th)	Charlotte Rae	Pickwick	Mrs. Bardell	
1967 (21st)
1967 (21st)	Peg Murray	Cabaret	Fraulein Kost	
1967 (21st)	Leland Palmer	A Joyful Noise	Miss Jimmie	
1967 (21st)	Josephine Premice	A Hand Is on the Gate	Various Characters	
1967 (21st)	Susan Watson	A Joyful Noise	Jenny Lee	
1968 (22nd)
1968 (22nd)	Lillian Hayman	Hallelujah, Baby!	Momma	
1968 (22nd)	Geula Gill	The Grand Music Hall of Israel	Various Characters	
1968 (22nd)	Julie Gregg	The Happy Time	Laurie Mannon	
1968 (22nd)	Alice Playten	Henry, Sweet Henry	Lillian 'Lili' Kafritz	
1969 (23rd)
1969 (23rd)	Marian Mercer	Promises, Promises	Marge MacDougall	
1969 (23rd)	Sandy Duncan	Canterbury Tales	Molly / Allison / May / The Sweetheart	
1969 (23rd)	Lorraine Serabian	Zorba	Leader	
1969 (23rd)	Virginia Vestoff	1776	Abigail Adams	

=== 1970s ===
Year	Actor	Musical	Role(s)	Ref.
1970 (24th)
1970 (24th)	Melba Moore	Purlie	Lutiebell Gussie Mae Jenkins	
1970 (24th)	Bonnie Franklin	Applause	Bonnie the Gypsy	
1970 (24th)	Penny Fuller	Applause	Eve Harrington	
1970 (24th)	Melissa Hart	Georgy	Meredith	
1971 (25th)
1971 (25th)	Patsy Kelly	No, No, Nanette	Pauline	
1971 (25th)	Barbara Barrie	Company	Sarah	
1971 (25th)	Pamela Myers	Company	Marta	
1972 (26th)
1972 (26th)	Linda Hopkins	Inner City	Various Characters	
1972 (26th)	Adrienne Barbeau	Grease	Betty Rizzo	
1972 (26th)	Bernadette Peters	On the Town	Hildy Esterhazy	
1972 (26th)	Beatrice Winde	Ain't Supposed to Die a Natural Death	Various Characters	
1973 (27th)
1973 (27th)	Patricia Elliott	A Little Night Music	Countess Charlotte Malcolm	
1973 (27th)	Hermione Gingold	A Little Night Music	Madame Armfeldt	
1973 (27th)	Patsy Kelly	Irene	Mrs. O'Dare	
1973 (27th)	Irene Ryan	Pippin	Berthe	
1974 (28th)
1974 (28th)	Janie Sell	Over Here!	Mitzi	
1974 (28th)	Leigh Beery	Cyrano	Roxana	
1974 (28th)	Maureen Brennan	Candide	Cunégonde	
1974 (28th)	June Gable	Candide	The Old Lady	
1974 (28th)	Ernestine Jackson	Raisin	Ruth Younger	
1975 (29th)
1975 (29th)	Dee Dee Bridgewater	The Wiz	Glinda	
1975 (29th)	Susan Browning	Goodtime Charley	Agnès Sorel	
1975 (29th)	Zan Charisse	Gypsy	Louise	
1975 (29th)	Taina Elg	Where's Charley?	Donna Lucia D'Alvadorez	
1975 (29th)	Kelly Garrett	The Night That Made America Famous	Various Characters	
1975 (29th)	Donna Theodore	Shenandoah	Ann Anderson	
1976 (30th)
1976 (30th)	Kelly Bishop	A Chorus Line	Sheila Bryant	
1976 (30th)	Priscilla Lopez	A Chorus Line	Diana Morales	
1976 (30th)	Patti LuPone	The Robber Bridegroom	Rosamund Musgrove	
1976 (30th)	Virginia Seidel	Very Good Eddie	Elsie Darling	
1977 (31st)
1977 (31st)	Delores Hall	Your Arms Too Short to Box with God	Various Characters	
1977 (31st)	Ellen Greene	The Threepenny Opera	Jenny	
1977 (31st)	Millicent Martin	Side by Side by Sondheim	Various Characters	
1977 (31st)	Julia McKenzie	Side by Side by Sondheim	Various Characters	
1978 (32nd)
1978 (32nd)	Nell Carter	Ain't Misbehavin'	Nell	
1978 (32nd)	Imogene Coca	On the Twentieth Century	Letitia Primrose	
1978 (32nd)	Ann Reinking	Dancin'	Various Characters	
1978 (32nd)	Charlayne Woodard	Ain't Misbehavin'	Charlayne	
1979 (33rd)
1979 (33rd)	Carlin Glynn	The Best Little Whorehouse in Texas	Mona Stangley	
1979 (33rd)	Joan Ellis	The Best Little Whorehouse in Texas	Shy	
1979 (33rd)	Millicent Martin	King of Hearts	Madame Madeleine	
1979 (33rd)	Maxine Sullivan	My Old Friends	Mrs. Cooper	

=== 1980s ===
Year	Actor	Musical	Role(s)	Ref.
1980 (34th)
1980 (34th)	Priscilla Lopez	A Day in Hollywood / A Night in the Ukraine	Gino / Usherette	
1980 (34th)	Debbie Allen	West Side Story	Anita	
1980 (34th)	Glenn Close	Barnum	Charity 'Chairy' Barnum	
1980 (34th)	Josie de Guzman	West Side Story	Maria	
1981 (35th)
1981 (35th)	Marilyn Cooper	Woman of the Year	Jan Donovan	
1981 (35th)	Phyllis Hyman	Sophisticated Ladies	Various Characters	
1981 (35th)	Wanda Richert	42nd Street	Peggy Sawyer	
1981 (35th)	Lynne Thigpen	Tintypes	Sussanah	
1982 (36th)
1982 (36th)	Liliane Montevecchi	Nine	Liliane La Fleur	
1982 (36th)	Karen Akers	Nine	Luisa Contini	
1982 (36th)	Laurie Beechman	Joseph and the Amazing Technicolor Dreamcoat	The Narrator	
1982 (36th)	Anita Morris	Nine	Carla Albanese	
1983 (37th)
1983 (37th)	Betty Buckley	Cats	Grizabella	
1983 (37th)	Christine Andreas	On Your Toes	Frankie Frayne	
1983 (37th)	Karla Burns	Show Boat	Queenie	
1983 (37th)	Denny Dillon	My One and Only	Mickey	
1984 (38th)
1984 (38th)	Lila Kedrova	Zorba	Madame Hortense	
1984 (38th)	Martine Allard	The Tap Dance Kid	Emma	
1984 (38th)	Liz Callaway	Baby	Lizzie Fields	
1984 (38th)	Dana Ivey	Sunday in the Park with George	Yvonne / Naomi Eisen	
1985 (39th)
1985 (39th)	Leilani Jones	Grind	Satin	
1985 (39th)	Evalyn Baron	Quilters	Daughter of the Frontier	
1985 (39th)	Mary Beth Peil	The King and I	Anna Leonowens	
1985 (39th)	Lenka Peterson	Quilters	Sarah	
1986 (40th)
1986 (40th)	Bebe Neuwirth	Sweet Charity	Nickie	
1986 (40th)	Patti Cohenour	The Mystery of Edwin Drood	Rosa Bud / Deirdre Peregrine	
1986 (40th)	Jana Schneider	The Mystery of Edwin Drood	Helena Landless / Janet Conover	
1986 (40th)	Elisabeth Welch	Jerome Kern Goes to Hollywood	Various Characters	
1987 (41st)
1987 (41st)	Frances Ruffelle	Les Misérables	Éponine	
1987 (41st)	Jane Connell	Me and My Girl	Duchess Maria	
1987 (41st)	Judy Kuhn	Les Misérables	Cosette	
1987 (41st)	Jane Summerhays	Me and My Girl	Jaqueline 'Jackie' Carstone	
1988 (42nd)
1988 (42nd)	Judy Kaye	The Phantom of the Opera	Carlotta Guidicelli	
1988 (42nd)	Leleti Khumalo	Sarafina!	Sarafina	
1988 (42nd)	Alyson Reed	Cabaret	Sally Bowles	
1988 (42nd)	Regina Resnik	Cabaret	Fraulein Schneider	
1989 (43rd)
1989 (43rd)	Debbie Gravitte	Jerome Robbins' Broadway	Hildy Esterhazy / Mazeppa / Rosalia / Company	
1989 (43rd)	Jane Lanier	Jerome Robbins' Broadway	Various Characters	
1989 (43rd)	Faith Prince	Jerome Robbins' Broadway	Ma / Tessie / Company	
1989 (43rd)	Julie Wilson	Legs Diamond	Flo	

=== 1990s ===
Year	Actor	Musical	Role(s)	Ref.
1990 (44th)
1990 (44th)	Randy Graff	City of Angels	Oolie / Donna	
1990 (44th)	Jane Krakowski	Grand Hotel	Freida Flamm / Flaemmchen	
1990 (44th)	Kathleen Rowe McAllen	Aspects of Love	Giulietta Trapani	
1990 (44th)	Crista Moore	Gypsy	Louise	
1991 (45th)
1991 (45th)	Daisy Eagan	The Secret Garden	Mary Lennox	
1991 (45th)	Alison Fraser	The Secret Garden	Martha Sowerby	
1991 (45th)	Cady Huffman	The Will Rogers Follies	Ziegfeld's Favorite	
1991 (45th)	LaChanze	Once on This Island	Ti Moune	
1992 (46th)
1992 (46th)	Tonya Pinkins	Jelly's Last Jam	Anita	
1992 (46th)	Liz Larsen	The Most Happy Fella	Cleo	
1992 (46th)	Vivian Reed	The High Rollers Social and Pleasure Club	Enchantress	
1992 (46th)	Barbara Walsh	Falsettos	Trina	
1993 (47th)
1993 (47th)	Andrea Martin	My Favorite Year	Alice Miller	
1993 (47th)	Marcia Mitzman Gaven	The Who's Tommy	Nora Walker	
1993 (47th)	Jan Graveson	Blood Brothers	Linda	
1993 (47th)	Lainie Kazan	My Favorite Year	Belle Carroca	
1994 (48th)
1994 (48th)	Audra McDonald	Carousel	Carrie Pipperidge	
1994 (48th)	Marcia Lewis	Grease	Miss Lynch	
1994 (48th)	Sally Mayes	She Loves Me	Ilona Ritter	
1994 (48th)	Marin Mazzie	Passion	Clara	
1995 (49th)
1995 (49th)	Gretha Boston	Show Boat	Queenie	
1995 (49th)	Brenda Braxton	Smokey Joe's Cafe	Various Characters	
1995 (49th)	B.J. Crosby	Smokey Joe's Cafe	Various Characters	
1995 (49th)	DeLee Lively	Smokey Joe's Cafe	Various Characters	
1996 (50th)
1996 (50th)	Ann Duquesnay	Bring in 'da Noise, Bring in 'da Funk	'da Singer / The Chanteuse	
1996 (50th)	Joohee Choi	The King and I	Tuptim	
1996 (50th)	Veanne Cox	Company	Amy	
1996 (50th)	Idina Menzel	Rent	Maureen Johnson	
1997 (51st)
1997 (51st)	Lillias White	The Life	Sonja	
1997 (51st)	Marcia Lewis	Chicago	Matron Mama Morton	
1997 (51st)	Andrea Martin	Candide	The Old Lady	
1997 (51st)	Debra Monk	Steel Pier	Shelby Stevens	
1998 (52nd)
1998 (52nd)	Audra McDonald	Ragtime	Sarah	
1998 (52nd)	Anna Kendrick	High Society	Dinah Lord	
1998 (52nd)	Tsidii Le Loka	The Lion King	Rafiki	
1998 (52nd)	Mary Louise Wilson	Cabaret	Fraulein Schneider	
1999 (53rd)
1999 (53rd)	Kristin Chenoweth	You're a Good Man, Charlie Brown	Sally Brown	
1999 (53rd)	Gretha Boston	It Ain't Nothin' But the Blues	Various Characters	
1999 (53rd)	Valarie Pettiford	Fosse	Various Characters	
1999 (53rd)	Mary Testa	On the Town	Madame Maude P. Dilly	

=== 2000s ===
Year	Actor	Musical	Role(s)	Ref.
2000 (54th)
2000 (54th)	Karen Ziemba	Contact	Wife	
2000 (54th)	Laura Benanti	Swing!	Various Characters	
2000 (54th)	Ann Hampton Callaway	Swing!	Various Characters	
2000 (54th)	Eartha Kitt	The Wild Party	Dolores	
2000 (54th)	Deborah Yates	Contact	Girl in a Yellow Dress / Gina Minetti	
2001 (55th)
2001 (55th)	Cady Huffman	The Producers	Ulla	
2001 (55th)	Polly Bergen	Follies	Carlotta Campion	
2001 (55th)	Kathleen Freeman	The Full Monty	Jeanette Burmeister	
2001 (55th)	Kate Levering	42nd Street	Peggy Sawyer	
2001 (55th)	Mary Testa	42nd Street	Maggie Jones	
2002 (56th)
2002 (56th)	Harriet Sansom Harris	Thoroughly Modern Millie	Mrs. Meers	
2002 (56th)	Laura Benanti	Into the Woods	Cinderella	
2002 (56th)	Spencer Kayden	Urinetown	Little Sally	
2002 (56th)	Judy Kaye	Mamma Mia!	Rosie Mulligan	
2002 (56th)	Andrea Martin	Oklahoma!	Aunt Eller	
2003 (57th)
2003 (57th)	Jane Krakowski	Nine	Carla Albanese	
2003 (57th)	Tammy Blanchard	Gypsy	Louise	
2003 (57th)	Mary Stuart Masterson	Nine	Luisa Contini	
2003 (57th)	Chita Rivera	Nine	Liliane La Fleur	
2003 (57th)	Ashley Tuttle	Movin' Out	Judy	
2004 (58th)
2004 (58th)	Anika Noni Rose	Caroline, or Change	Emmie Thibodeaux	
2004 (58th)	Beth Fowler	The Boy from Oz	Marion Woolnough	
2004 (58th)	Isabel Keating	The Boy from Oz	Judy Garland	
2004 (58th)	Jennifer Westfeldt	Wonderful Town	Eileen Sherwood	
2004 (58th)	Karen Ziemba	Never Gonna Dance	Mabel Pritt	
2005 (59th)
2005 (59th)	Sara Ramirez	Spamalot	Lady of the Lake	
2005 (59th)	Joanna Gleason	Dirty Rotten Scoundrels	Muriel Eubanks	
2005 (59th)	Celia Keenan-Bolger	The 25th Annual Putnam County Spelling Bee	Olive Ostrovsky	
2005 (59th)	Jan Maxwell	Chitty Chitty Bang Bang	Baroness Bomburst	
2005 (59th)	Kelli O'Hara	The Light in the Piazza	Clara Johnson	
2006 (60th)
2006 (60th)	Beth Leavel	The Drowsy Chaperone	The Drowsy Chaperone / Beatrice Stockwell	
2006 (60th)	Carolee Carmello	Lestat	Gabrielle de Lioncourt	
2006 (60th)	Felicia P. Fields	The Color Purple	Sofia Johnson	
2006 (60th)	Megan Lawrence	The Pajama Game	Gladys Hotchkiss	
2006 (60th)	Elisabeth Withers	The Color Purple	Shug Avery	
2007 (61st)
2007 (61st)	Mary Louise Wilson	Grey Gardens	'Big Edie' Beale	
2007 (61st)	Charlotte d'Amboise	A Chorus Line	Cassie Ferguson	
2007 (61st)	Rebecca Luker	Mary Poppins	Winifred Banks	
2007 (61st)	Orfeh	Legally Blonde	Paulette Bonafonté	
2007 (61st)	Karen Ziemba	Curtains	Georgia Hendricks	
2008 (62nd)
2008 (62nd)	Laura Benanti	Gypsy	Louise	
2008 (62nd)	Loretta Ables Sayre	Rodgers & Hammerstein's South Pacific	Bloody Mary	
2008 (62nd)	De'Adre Aziza	Passing Strange	Edwina / Marianna / Sudabey	
2008 (62nd)	Andrea Martin	The New Mel Brooks Musical Young Frankenstein	Frau Blücher	
2008 (62nd)	Olga Merediz	In the Heights	Abuela Claudia	
2009 (63rd)
2009 (63rd)	Karen Olivo	West Side Story	Anita	
2009 (63rd)	Jennifer Damiano	Next to Normal	Natalie Goodman	
2009 (63rd)	Haydn Gwynne	Billy Elliot the Musical	Georgia Wilkinson	
2009 (63rd)	Martha Plimpton	Pal Joey	Gladys Bumps	
2009 (63rd)	Carole Shelley	Billy Elliot the Musical	Grandma	

=== 2010s ===
Year	Actor	Musical	Role(s)	Ref.
2010 (64th)
2010 (64th)	Katie Finneran	Promises, Promises	Marge MacDougall	
2010 (64th)	Barbara Cook	Sondheim on Sondheim	Various Characters	
2010 (64th)	Angela Lansbury	A Little Night Music	Madame Armfeldt	
2010 (64th)	Karine Plantadit	Come Fly Away	Kate	
2010 (64th)	Lillias White	Fela!	Funmilayo Kuti	
2011 (65th)
2011 (65th)	Nikki M. James	The Book of Mormon	Nabulungi Hatimbi	
2011 (65th)	Laura Benanti	Women on the Verge of a Nervous Breakdown	Candela	
2011 (65th)	Tammy Blanchard	How to Succeed in Business Without Really Trying	Hedy La Rue	
2011 (65th)	Victoria Clark	Sister Act	Mother Superior	
2011 (65th)	Patti LuPone	Women on the Verge of a Nervous Breakdown	Lucia	
2012 (66th)
2012 (66th)	Judy Kaye	Nice Work If You Can Get It	Estonia Dulworth	
2012 (66th)	Elizabeth A. Davis	Once	Réza	
2012 (66th)	Jayne Houdyshell	Follies	Hattie Walker	
2012 (66th)	Jessie Mueller	On a Clear Day You Can See Forever	Melinda Wells	
2012 (66th)	Da'Vine Joy Randolph	Ghost the Musical	Oda Mae Brown	
2013 (67th)
2013 (67th)	Andrea Martin	Pippin	Berthe	
2013 (67th)	Annaleigh Ashford	Kinky Boots	Lauren	
2013 (67th)	Victoria Clark	Rodgers + Hammerstein's Cinderella	Marie / Fairy Godmother	
2013 (67th)	Keala Settle	Hands on a Hardbody	Norma Valverde	
2013 (67th)	Lauren Ward	Matilda the Musical	Miss Jennifer "Jenny" Honey	
2014 (68th)
2014 (68th)	Lena Hall	Hedwig and the Angry Inch	Yitzhak	
2014 (68th)	Linda Emond	Cabaret	Fräulein Schneider	
2014 (68th)	Anika Larsen	Beautiful: The Carole King Musical	Cynthia Weil	
2014 (68th)	Adriane Lenox	After Midnight	Various Characters	
2014 (68th)	Lauren Worsham	A Gentleman's Guide to Love and Murder	Phoebe D'Ysquith	
2015 (69th)
2015 (69th)	Ruthie Ann Miles	The King and I	Lady Thiang	
2015 (69th)	Victoria Clark	Gigi	Mamita	
2015 (69th)	Judy Kuhn	Fun Home	Helen Fontana Bechdel	
2015 (69th)	Sydney Lucas	Fun Home	Small Alison	
2015 (69th)	Emily Skeggs	Fun Home	Medium Alison	
2016 (70th)
2016 (70th)	Renée Elise Goldsberry	Hamilton	Angelica Schuyler	
2016 (70th)	Danielle Brooks	The Color Purple	Sofia Johnson	
2016 (70th)	Jane Krakowski	She Loves Me	Ilona Ritter	
2016 (70th)	Jennifer Simard	Disaster!	Sister Mary Downy	
2016 (70th)	Adrienne Warren	Shuffle Along	Gertrude Saunders / Florence Mills	
2017 (71st)
2017 (71st)	Rachel Bay Jones	Dear Evan Hansen	Heidi Hansen	
2017 (71st)	Kate Baldwin	Hello, Dolly!	Irene Molloy	
2017 (71st)	Stephanie J. Block	Falsettos	Trina	
2017 (71st)	Jenn Colella	Come from Away	Annette, Beverley Bass, and others	
2017 (71st)	Mary Beth Peil	Anastasia	Dowager Empress Maria Feodorovna	
2018 (72nd)
2018 (72nd)	Lindsay Mendez	Carousel	Carrie Pipperidge	
2018 (72nd)	Ariana DeBose	Summer: The Donna Summer Musical	Disco Donna	
2018 (72nd)	Renée Fleming	Carousel	Nettie Fowler	
2018 (72nd)	Ashley Park	Mean Girls	Gretchen Wieners	
2018 (72nd)	Diana Rigg	My Fair Lady	Mrs. Higgins	
2019 (73rd)
2019 (73rd)	Ali Stroker	Oklahoma!	Ado Annie Carnes	
2019 (73rd)	Lilli Cooper	Tootsie	Julie Nichols	
2019 (73rd)	Amber Gray	Hadestown	Persephone	
2019 (73rd)	Sarah Stiles	Tootsie	Sandy Lester	
2019 (73rd)	Mary Testa	Oklahoma!	Aunt Eller	

=== 2020s ===
Year	Actor	Musical	Role(s)
2020 (74th)
2020 (74th)	Lauren Patten	Jagged Little Pill	Jo Taylor
2020 (74th)	Kathryn Gallagher	Jagged Little Pill	Bella Fox
2020 (74th)	Celia Rose Gooding	Jagged Little Pill	Frankie Healy
2020 (74th)	Robyn Hurder	Moulin Rouge! The Musical	Nini Legs-in-the-Air
2020 (74th)	Myra Lucretia Taylor	Tina: The Tina Turner Musical	Gran Georgeanna
2022 (75th)
2022 (75th)	Patti LuPone	Company	Joanne
2022 (75th)	Jeannette Bayardelle	Girl from the North Country	Mrs. Neilsen
2022 (75th)	Shoshana Bean	Mr. Saturday Night	Susan Young
2022 (75th)	Jayne Houdyshell	The Music Man	Mrs. Shinn
2022 (75th)	L Morgan Lee	A Strange Loop	Thought 1
2022 (75th)	Jennifer Simard	Company	Sarah
2023 (76th)
2023 (76th)	Bonnie Milligan	Kimberly Akimbo	Aunt Debra
2023 (76th)	Julia Lester	Into the Woods	Little Red Ridinghood
2023 (76th)	Ruthie Ann Miles	Sweeney Todd: The Demon Barber of Fleet Street	The Beggar Woman
2023 (76th)	NaTasha Yvette Williams	Some Like It Hot	Sweet Sue
2023 (76th)	Betsy Wolfe	& Juliet	Anne Hathaway
2024 (77th)
2024 (77th)	Kecia Lewis	Hell's Kitchen	Miss Liza Jane
2024 (77th)	Shoshana Bean	Hell's Kitchen	Jersey
2024 (77th)	Amber Iman	Lempicka	Rafaela
2024 (77th)	Nikki M. James	Suffs	Ida B. Wells
2024 (77th)	Lindsay Mendez	Merrily We Roll Along	Mary Flynn
2024 (77th)	Bebe Neuwirth	Cabaret at the Kit Kat Club	Fraulein Schneider
2024 (77th)	Leslie Rodriguez Kritzer	Spamalot	Lady of the Lake
2025 (78th)
2025 (78th)	Natalie Venetia Belcon	Buena Vista Social Club	Omara Portuondo
2025 (78th)	Julia Knitel	Dead Outlaw	Helen McCurdy / Maggie Johnson / Millicent Esper
2025 (78th)	Gracie Lawrence	Just in Time	Connie Francis
2025 (78th)	Justina Machado	Real Women Have Curves: The Musical	Carmen Garcia
2025 (78th)	Joy Woods	Gypsy	Louise
2026 (79th)
2026 (79th)	Shoshana Bean	The Lost Boys	Lucy Emerson
2026 (79th)	Hannah Cruz	Chess	Svetlana Sergievsky
2026 (79th)	Rachel Dratch	The Rocky Horror Show	Narrator
2026 (79th)	Ana Gasteyer	Schmigadoon!	Mildred Layton
2026 (79th)	Nichelle Lewis	Ragtime	Sarah

== Most wins ==
2 wins

- Judy Kaye
- Andrea Martin
- Audra McDonald

== Most nominations ==
5 nominations

- Andrea Martin

4 nominations

- Laura Benanti

3 nominations

- Shoshana Bean
- Victoria Clark
- Judy Kaye
- Jane Krakowski
- Patti LuPone
- Mary Testa
- Karen Ziemba

2 nominations

- Tammy Blanchard
- Gretha Boston
- Barbara Cook
- Helen Gallagher
- Jayne Houdyshell
- Cady Huffman
- Nikki M. James
- Patsy Kelly
- Judy Kuhn
- Marcia Lewis
- Priscilla Lopez
- Julienne Marie
- Millicent Martin
- Audra McDonald
- Lindsay Mendez
- Ruthie Ann Miles
- Bebe Neuwirth
- Mary Beth Peil
- Josephine Premice
- Chita Rivera
- Jennifer Simard
- Louise Troy
- Lillias White
- Mary Louise Wilson

== Musicals with multiple nominations ==
boldface=winner

- The Sound of Music – **Patricia Neway** and Lauri Peters, Kathy Dunn, Evanna Lien, Mary Susan Locke, Marilyn Robers, William Snowden & Joseph Stewart
- A Joyful Noise – Leland Palmer and Susan Watson
- Applause – Bonnie Franklin and Penny Fuller
- Company – Barbara Barrie and Pamela Myers
- A Little Night Music – **Patricia Elliott** and Hermione Gingold
- Candide – Maureen Brennan and June Gable
- A Chorus Line – **Kelly Bishop** and Priscilla Lopez
- Side by Side by Sondheim – Millicent Martin and Julia McKenzie
- Ain't Misbehavin' – **Nell Carter** and Charlayne Woodard
- The Best Little Whorehouse in Texas – **Carlin Glynn** and Joan Ellis
- West Side Story – Debbie Allen and Josie de Guzman
- Nine – Karen Akers, **Liliane Montevecchi** and Anita Morris
- Quilters – Evalyn Baron and Lenka Peterson
- The Mystery of Edwin Drood – Patti Cohenour and Jana Schneider
- Les Misérables – **Frances Ruffelle** and Judy Kuhn
- Me and My Girl – Jane Connell and Jane Summerhays (Les Misérables and Me and My Girl were nominated the same year)
- Cabaret – Alyson Reed and Regina Resnik
- Jerome Robbins' Broadway – **Debbie Gravitte**, Jane Lanier and Faith Prince
- The Secret Garden – **Daisy Eagan** and Alison Fraser
- Smokey Joe's Cafe – Brenda Braxton, B.J. Crosby and DeLee Lively
- Contact – Deborah Yates and **Karen Ziemba**
- Swing! – Laura Benanti and Ann Hampton Callaway (Contact and Swing! were nominated the same year)
- 42nd Street – Kate Levering and Mary Testa
- Nine – **Jane Krakowski**, Mary Stuart Masterson and Chita Rivera (This is the second time the show had multiple nominations)
- The Boy from Oz – Beth Fowler and Isabel Keating
- The Color Purple – Felicia P. Fields and Elisabeth Withers
- Billy Elliot the Musical – Haydn Gwynne and Carole Shelley
- Women on the Verge of a Nervous Breakdown – Laura Benanti and Patti LuPone
- Fun Home – Judy Kuhn, Sydney Lucas and Emily Skeggs
- Carousel – Renée Fleming and **Lindsay Mendez**
- Oklahoma! – **Ali Stroker** and Mary Testa
- Tootsie – Lilli Cooper and Sarah Stiles (Oklahoma! and Tootsie were nominated the same year)
- Jagged Little Pill – Kathryn Gallagher, Celia Rose Gooding and **Lauren Patten**
- Company – **Patti LuPone** and Jennifer Simard (This is the second time the show had multiple nominations)
- Hell's Kitchen – Shoshana Bean and **Kecia Lewis**

== See also ==
- Dorian Award for Outstanding Featured Performance in a Broadway Musical
- Drama Desk Award for Outstanding Featured Actress in a Musical
- Drama Desk Award for Outstanding Featured Performance in a Musical
- Drama League Award for Distinguished Performance
- Laurence Olivier Award for Best Actress in a Supporting Role in a Musical
- Lists of acting awards
- List of awards for supporting actor
- Outer Critics Circle Award for Outstanding Featured Performer in a Broadway Musical
