= A Hand Is on the Gate =

- Original language: English
- Genre: Drama, musical

Premiere
- Date: 1966
- Place: Longacre Theatre, New York City, USA.
- Directed by: Roscoe Lee Browne

A Hand Is on the Gate is a collection of Black poetry and song that had a limited run on Broadway in 1966. The production marked the directorial debut of actor Roscoe Lee Browne, who also arranged the material and served as the show's emcee. It was produced by Ivor David Balding and Stephen Aaron; its music was arranged by Bill Lee and Stuart Scharf, and its lighting design was by Jules Fisher.

The cast of eight also included Josephine Premice—who received a Tony Award nomination as Best Featured or Supporting Actress in a Musical for her performance—as well as Leon Bibb, Gloria Foster, Moses Gunn, Ellen Holly, James Earl Jones and Cicely Tyson.

== Awards and nominations ==
=== Original Broadway production ===
Year	Award	Category	Nominee	Result
1967	Tony Award	Best Featured Actor in a Musical	Leon Bibb	Nominated
1967	Tony Award	Best Featured Actress in a Musical	Josephine Premice	Nominated
