= Susan Fales-Hill =

American screenwriter

- Born: Susan Marya Fales; August 15, 1962 (age 63); Rome, Italy
- Occupations: Television producer, author, screenwriter
- Years active: 1984–present
- Notable work: One Flight Up (novel), Imperfect Bliss (novel), Always Wear Joy (memoir)
- Spouse: Aaron Hill (m. 1997)
- Parent(s): Timothy Fales; Josephine Premice
- Website: Official website

Susan Fales-Hill (born August 15, 1962) is an American television producer, author, screenwriter and an advocate for the arts and education.

== Biography ==
Fales-Hill is the daughter of Haitian-American actress Josephine Premice, a descendant of the Haitian-born Black Revolutionary War hero Napoleon Premice and a performer that was well known for her work on the Broadway stage, and Timothy Fales, an American stockbroker, whose own ancestors were pilgrims arriving on the Mayflower from England in 1620. She was born in Rome, Italy and raised in New York City, where she attended the Lycée Français de New York. She graduated from Harvard University with a degree in literature and history.

Fales-Hill was a writer for The Cosby Show and the lead writer and producer for A Different World.

Fales-Hill married Aaron Hill, a New York banker, in 1997. Their daughter Bristol was born in 2003.

In addition to her native English, Fales-Hill is able to speak French, Italian, Spanish, and speaks some Haitian Creole.
