= Josephine Premice =

Haitian-American actress

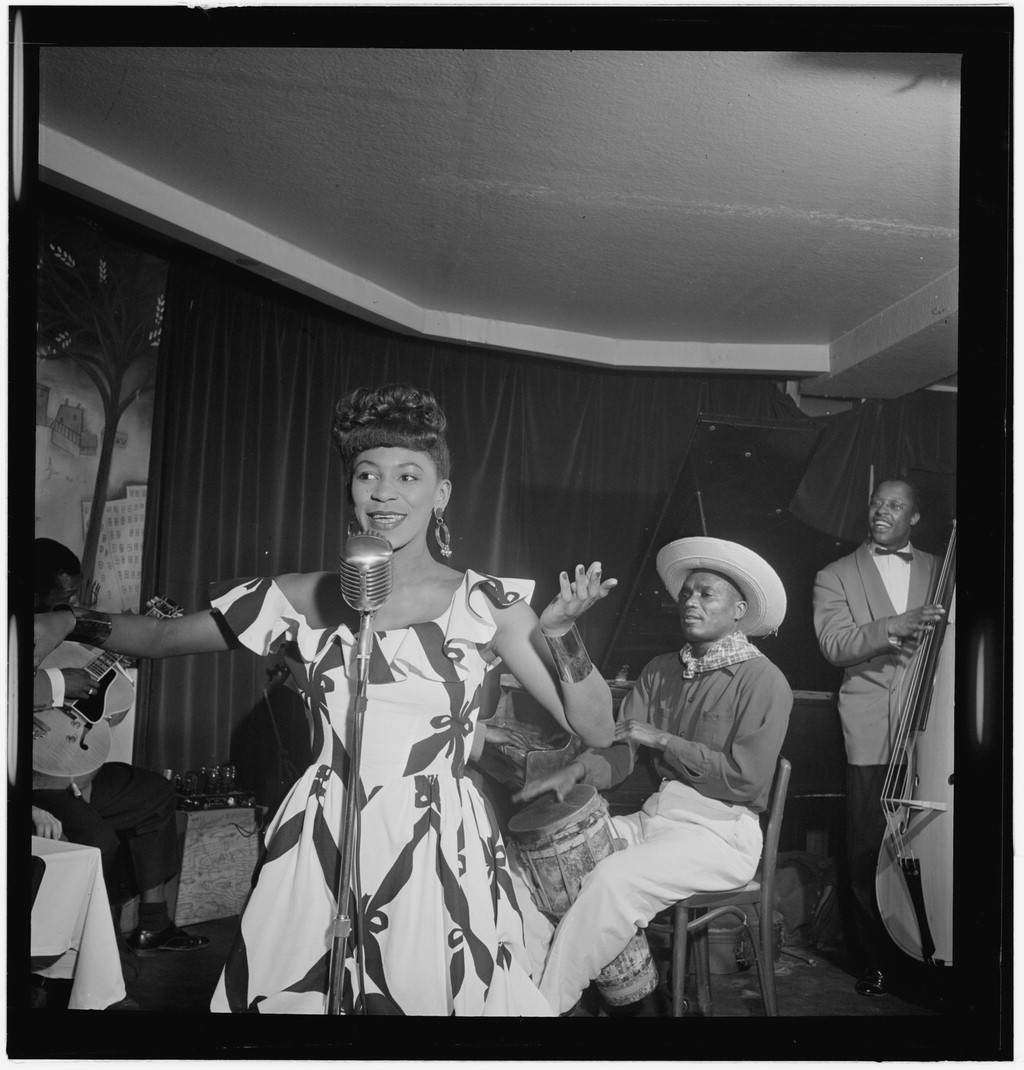
- Born: Josephine Mary Premice; July 21, 1926; Brooklyn, New York, U.S.
- Died: April 13, 2001 (aged 74); Manhattan, New York, U.S.
- Occupations: Actress, singer
- Years active: 1941–1994
- Children: Susan Fales-Hill; Enrico Fales

Josephine Mary Premice (July 21, 1926 – April 13, 2001) was a Haitian-American actress and singer known for her work on the Broadway stage.

== Early life ==
Josephine Mary Premice was born in Brooklyn, New York, the daughter of Thelomaine and Lucas Premice. Her parents were part of the Haitian aristocracy who fled Haiti; her ancestor, Napoleon Premice, was a Haitian-born Black veteran of the U.S. Revolutionary War.

Her father, Lucas Premice, who claimed the title Count de Brodequin in the Haitian nobility, was part of a failed rebellion to try to overthrow the Haitian head of state. He was imprisoned in Guiana for his role in the plot, and both he and a fellow prisoner to whom he was chained were forced to escape and flee through the woods to friends that awaited them on the coast. On the third day of their journey, the other man died, and Lucas is said to have had to cut off the man's arm to free himself from the chains. He was brought to France, where he learned to cut fur for the couturiers. He eventually immigrated to New York in the early 1920s.

Premice and her sister, Adele, were given the education and training of an "at-home finishing school" and treated like part of the elite, at a time when African Americans were treated as second-class citizens, even in the northern states.

== Theatre ==
Premice made her Broadway debut in a 1945 revue show called Blue Holiday. The show was choreographed by Katherine Dunham, with whom Josephine had studied dance and her co-star was Ethel Waters. She was in the pre-Broadway cast of the musical House of Flowers with Diahann Carroll and Pearl Bailey. Josephine was nominated for a Tony Award for her work in the 1957 musical Jamaica as Ginger alongside leading lady Lena Horne. Her next Broadway appearance in A Hand Is on the Gate, where she performed African American poetry works alongside James Earl Jones, Cicely Tyson, and Gloria Foster, garnered her a second Best Featured Actress in a Musical Tony Award nomination. Her final Broadway appearance came in 1976 with the musical Bubbling Brown Sugar. Reviewing the production in The New York Times, Clive Barnes wrote that Ms. Premice "can almost make a feather boa come alive."

== Film and television ==
Premice appeared as Louise Belefonte on the final weeks of the CBS soap opera The Secret Storm. She played a supporting role in the 1974 television movie The Autobiography of Miss Jane Pittman as Ms. Gautier. She guest-starred on The Jeffersons in 1979, playing Louise Jefferson's sister, and The Cosby Show in 1986. Between 1991 and 1993, she guest-starred as Desiree Porter (after an initial appearance as Erdine Abernathy) in several episodes of A Different World.

== Later years ==
An alumna of Columbia University with a degree in anthropology, she was also known for her calypso recordings and fashion sense.

Premice died in her Manhattan residence on April 13, 2001, at the age of 74 from complications of emphysema. She and her estranged husband, Timothy Fales, had two children, Enrico Fales (b. 1959) and Susan Fales-Hill (b. 1962). In 2003, her daughter published a biography of her mother titled Always Wear Joy: My Mother, Bold and Beautiful.
