= Louise Troy =

American actress (1933–1994)

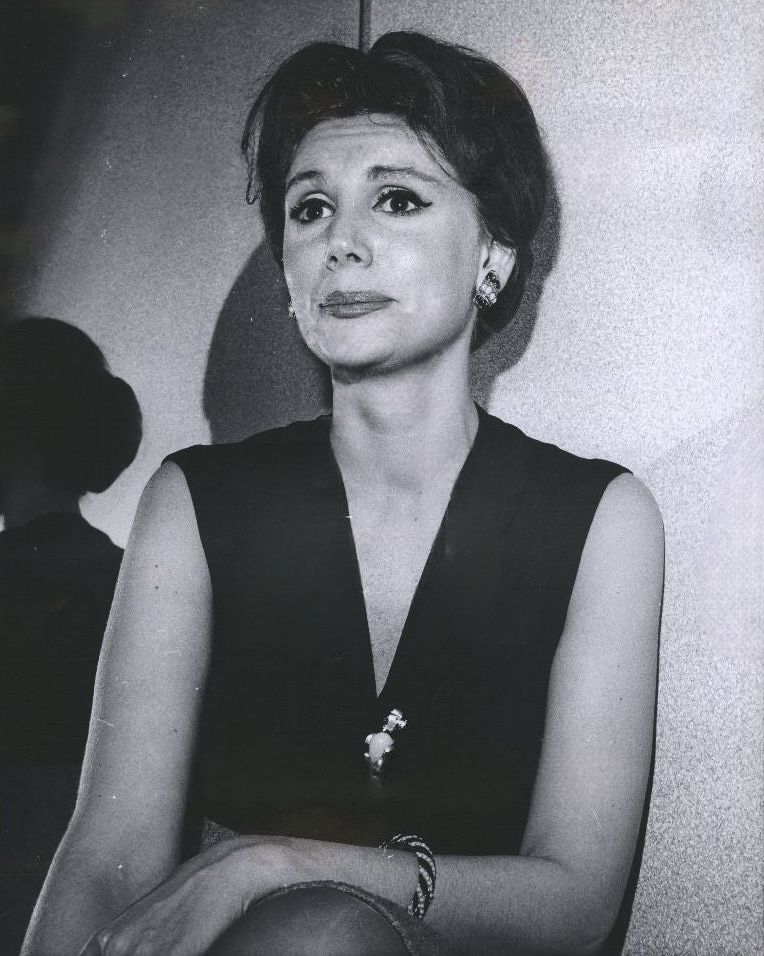
- Troy in 1966
- Born: November 9, 1933; New York City, U.S.
- Died: May 5, 1994 (aged 60); New York City, U.S.
- Education: American Academy of Dramatic Arts
- Occupation: Actress
- Years active: 1954–1992
- Spouses: Werner Klemperer (m. 1969; div. 1975) Douglas Seale (m. 1992)

Louise Troy (November 9, 1933 – May 5, 1994) was an American actress of stage and screen. She is best known for her performances in Tovarich (1963) and Walking Happy (1966), for both of which roles she was nominated for Tony Awards. Her signature stage role was that of the lead in High Spirits (1964).

== Personal life ==
Born in Manhattan, Troy was the only child of Jewish parents: Ella Ziebel and Seymour Troy (original family name: Taradajka). Her mother was an actress In the New York Yiddish theater, as was her grandmother, Frida Gespass, and her grandmother's sisters, Helene Gespass and Ella Gespass Wallerstein. The Gespass sisters, originally from Lemberg, Austria, were part of the founding generation of the Yiddish theater in America. Her father was a major designer and manufacturer of women's shoes. She studied with Lee Strasberg and at the American Academy of Dramatic Arts.

== Career ==
In 1955, Troy first appeared off-Broadway in The Infernal Machine. She made her Broadway debut in the musical Pipe Dream (1955). She received critical acclaim for her role opposite Edward Woodward, Tammy Grimes, Carol Arthur, and the legendary Beatrice Lillie in the 1964 musical High Spirits, which was based on Noël Coward's comedy, Blithe Spirit.

She was also known for her guest appearances on the television show Hogan's Heroes, on which her then husband Werner Klemperer starred as "Colonel Klink". Her other TV appearances included Kate and Allie, Room 222, The Odd Couple, Cannon, and Honey West, among others. In the 1970s, she appeared on the long running daytime soap opera The Guiding Light, twice (as Audrey Frost Mills in 1974, and as Gladys Shields in 1978). She appeared in the first season of Barnaby Jones (in the episode: "To Denise, with Love and Murder", which aired on April 22, 1973). Her film appearances include Yours, Mine and Ours (1968), The Swimmer (1968) and Ghostbusters II (1989).

== Marriage ==
Troy was first married to actor Werner Klemperer, from 1969 until they divorced in 1975, She then married her second husband, actor and director Douglas Seale in 1992; they remained married until her death in 1994, aged 60. Both unions were childless.

== Death ==
Troy died of breast cancer at the age of 60 in 1994 at her home in New York City.

== Filmography ==
Year	Title	Role	Notes
1954	Roogie's Bump	Kate	
1964	The Parisienne and the Prudes	Elinor Grater	
1968	Yours, Mine and Ours	Madeleine Love	
1968	The Swimmer	Grace Biswanger	
1989	Ghostbusters II	Woman with Fur Coat	
1991	Missing Pieces	Mrs. Waldman	Final film role

== Awards and nominations ==
Year	Award	Category	Nominated work	Results	Ref.
1963	Tony Awards	Best Supporting or Featured Actress in a Musical	Tovarich	Nominated	
1964	Tony Awards	Best Supporting or Featured Actress in a Musical	High Spirits	Nominated	
1967	Tony Awards	Best Leading Actress in a Musical	Walking Happy	Nominated	
