= Tovarich (musical) =

1963 stage musical

- Original Cast Recording
- Music: Lee Pockriss
- Lyrics: Anne Croswell
- Book: David Shaw
- Basis: 1935 French play Tovarich
- Productions: 1963 Broadway

Tovarich is a 1963 stage musical in two acts with book by David Shaw; music by Lee Pockriss and lyrics by Anne Croswell; based on the comedy by Jacques Deval and Robert E. Sherwood.

== Production history ==
The musical opened in New York at The Broadway Theatre on 18 March 1963 then transferred to Majestic Theatre and the Winter Garden Theatre. It ran for a total of 264 performances. Billboard reported that the production "having the distinction of being the first musical to open on Broadway without an original cast waxing contract, finally landed a deal when Capitol agreed to record the show last week [late May 1963]."

The production was directed by Peter Glenville and choreographed by Herbert Ross. The original cast included Vivien Leigh, Jean Pierre Aumont, George S. Irving, Louise Kirtland, Alexander Scourby and Louise Troy.

Vivien Leigh won the Tony Award for Best Actress in a Musical. Leigh left the production on short notice because of illness; understudy Joan Copeland took over the role October 7, 1963 and she was replaced by Eva Gabor on October 21, 1963.

== Original cast and characters ==
Character	Broadway (1963)
Tatiana Petrovna	Vivien Leigh
Mikail Alexandrovich Ouratieff	Jean-Pierre Aumont
Gorotchenko	Alexander Scourby
Natalia Mayovskaya	Louise Troy
Charles Davis	George S. Irving
Grace Davis	Louise Kirtland
George Davis	Byron Mitchell
Helen Davis	Margery Gray
Maria Soukhomine	Bettye Jenkins
Marina	Rita Metzger
Vassily	Paul Michael

== Songs ==
Act I

- "Nitchevo"
- "I Go to Bed"
- "You'll Make an Elegant Butler (I'll Make an Elegant Maid)"¹
- "Stuck With Each Other"
- "Say You'll Stay"
- "You Love Me"
- "Introduction Tango"
- "That Face"
- "Wilkes-Barre, Pa."
- "No! No! No!"
- "A Small Cartel"

Act II

- "It Used to Be"
- "Make a Friend"
- "The Only One"
- "Uh-Oh!"
- "Managed"
- "I Know the Feeling"
- "All for You"
- "Grande Polonaise"

¹ - music and lyrics by Joan Javits and Philip Springer

== Awards and nominations ==
=== Original Broadway production ===
Year	Award	Category	Nominee	Result
1963	Tony Award	Best Performance by a Leading Actress in a Musical	Vivien Leigh	Won
1963	Tony Award	Best Performance by a Featured Actress in a Musical	Louise Troy	Nominated
