= Walking Happy =

- Music: Jimmy Van Heusen
- Lyrics: Sammy Cahn
- Book: Roger O. Hirson; Ketti Frings
- Basis: Hobson's Choice by Harold Brighouse
- Productions: 1966 Broadway

Walking Happy is a musical with music by Jimmy Van Heusen, lyrics by Sammy Cahn and book by Roger O. Hirson and Ketti Frings. The story is based on the 1916 play Hobson's Choice by Harold Brighouse. The musical was nominated for six Tony Awards, including Best Musical.

== Production history ==
The production opened on Broadway at the Lunt-Fontanne Theatre on November 26, 1966 and ran for 161 performances. Directed by Cy Feuer with choreography by Danny Daniels. Conductor Herbert Grossman served as music director.

The original cast recording was released by Angel Records in 1966.

== Plot synopsis ==
In Lancashire, England in 1880 the men of the town gather in the local pub, with much drinking. The widower Henry Hobson, owner of a boot shop, has three daughters, and he wishes them to marry. The local leader of the temperance league, George Beenstock, has two sons. The two younger Hobson daughters flirt with the Beenstock sons, while Hobson tells his eldest daughter Maggie that her time has passed. Maggie decides to make a match with Will, a skilled shoemaker, even though Will is engaged to another. Will and Maggie establish their own boot shop. Meanwhile, Hobson's drinking continues, his young daughters try to take Maggie's place at his shop, and Will and Maggie marry. Hobson and Beenstock settle on a dowry for the young ladies. Hobson realizes that he needs Maggie and Will, and they become partners.

== Original cast and characters ==
Character	Broadway (1966)
Maggie Hobson	Louise Troy
Will Massop	Norman Wisdom
Henry Horatio Hobson	George Rose
Georgy Beenstock	Ed Bakey
Tubby Wadlow	Gordon Dilworth
Mrs. Hepworth	Emma Trekman
Vickie Hobson	Gretchen Van Aken
Alice Hobson	Sharon Dierking
Albert Beenstock	James B. Spann
Freddie Beenstock	Michael Berkson
Mrs. Figgins	Lucille Benson
Ada Figgins	Jane Laughlin

== Songs ==
Act 1

- "Think of Something Else"
- "Where Was I"
- "How D'ya Talk to a Girl"
- "Clog and Grog"
- "If I Be Your Best Chance"
- "A Joyful Thing"
- "What Makes It Happen"
- "Use Your Noggin'"

Act 2

- "You're Right, You're Right"
- "I'll Make a Man of the Man"
- "Walking Happy"
- "I Don't Think I'm In Love"
- "Such a Sociable Sort"
- "It Might As Well Be Her"
- "People Who Are Nice"
- "You're Right, You're Right" (reprise)
- "I Don't Think I'm In Love" (reprise)

The title song "Walking Happy" was originally meant to be used in the 1963 film Papa's Delicate Condition, with Jackie Gleason singing it, but it was dropped before the film's release.

== Critical response ==
Walter Kerr reviewed the musical for the New York Times. He wrote that the musical was "easygoing, unpretentious, minor-league...a light, slight, occasionally charming pastime." The "principal asset" is Norman Wisdom, a "zany original".

== Awards and nominations ==
=== Original Broadway production ===
Year	Award	Category	Nominee	Result
1967	Tony Award	Best Musical		Nominated
1967	Tony Award	Best Composer and Lyricist	Sammy Cahn and Jimmy Van Heusen	Nominated
1967	Tony Award	Best Performance by a Leading Actor in a Musical	Norman Wisdom	Nominated
1967	Tony Award	Best Performance by a Leading Actress in a Musical	Louise Troy	Nominated
1967	Tony Award	Best Performance by a Featured Actor in a Musical	Gordon Dilworth	Nominated
1967	Tony Award	Best Choreography	Danny Daniels	Nominated
