= Tony Award for Best Actress in a Musical =

American theatre award for Broadway actresses

- 2026 Recipient: Caissie Levy
- Awarded for: Best Performance by a Leading Actress in a Musical
- Location: New York City
- Presented by: American Theatre Wing The Broadway League
- Currently held by: Caissie Levy for Ragtime (2026)
- Website: TonyAwards.com

The Tony Award for Best Performance by a Leading Actress in a Musical is an honor presented at the Tony Awards, a ceremony established in 1947 as the Antoinette Perry Awards for Excellence in Theatre, to actresses for quality leading roles in a musical play, whether a new production or a revival. The awards are named after Antoinette Perry, an American actress who died in 1946.

Honors in several categories are presented at the ceremony annually by the Tony Award Productions, a joint venture of The Broadway League and the American Theatre Wing, to "honor the best performances and stage productions of the previous year."

The award was originally called the Tony Award for Actresses—Musical. It was first presented to Grace Hartman at the 2nd Tony Awards for her portrayal of various characters in Angel in the Wings. Before 1956, nominees' names were not made public; the change was made by the awards committee to "have a greater impact on theatregoers".

In 1965, Liza Minnelli, age 19, became the youngest actress to win the award. She is followed by Lea Salonga, age 20, in 1991. In 2017, Bette Midler, age 71, became the oldest actress to win the award. She is followed by Victoria Clark, age 63, in 2023.

Angela Lansbury holds the record as the performer with the most wins in this category, with a total of four. Chita Rivera has the most nominations, with eight. The characters of Rose in Gypsy and Anna Leonowens in The King and I currently hold the record for most wins, each winning three times. Rose also holds the record for most nominations, with six.

== Winners and nominees ==
indicates the winner

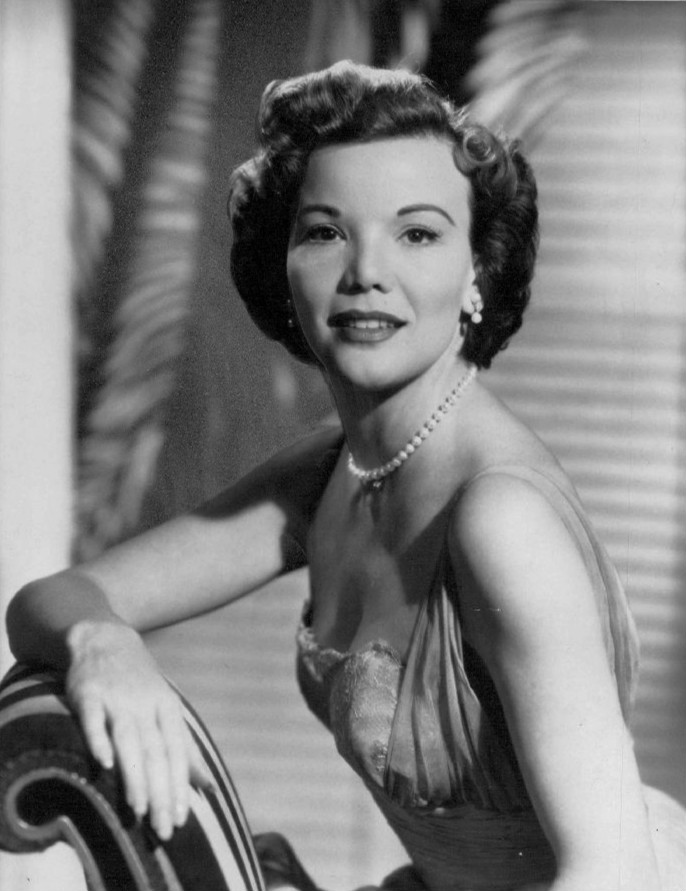
Nanette Fabray won for Love Life (1949)

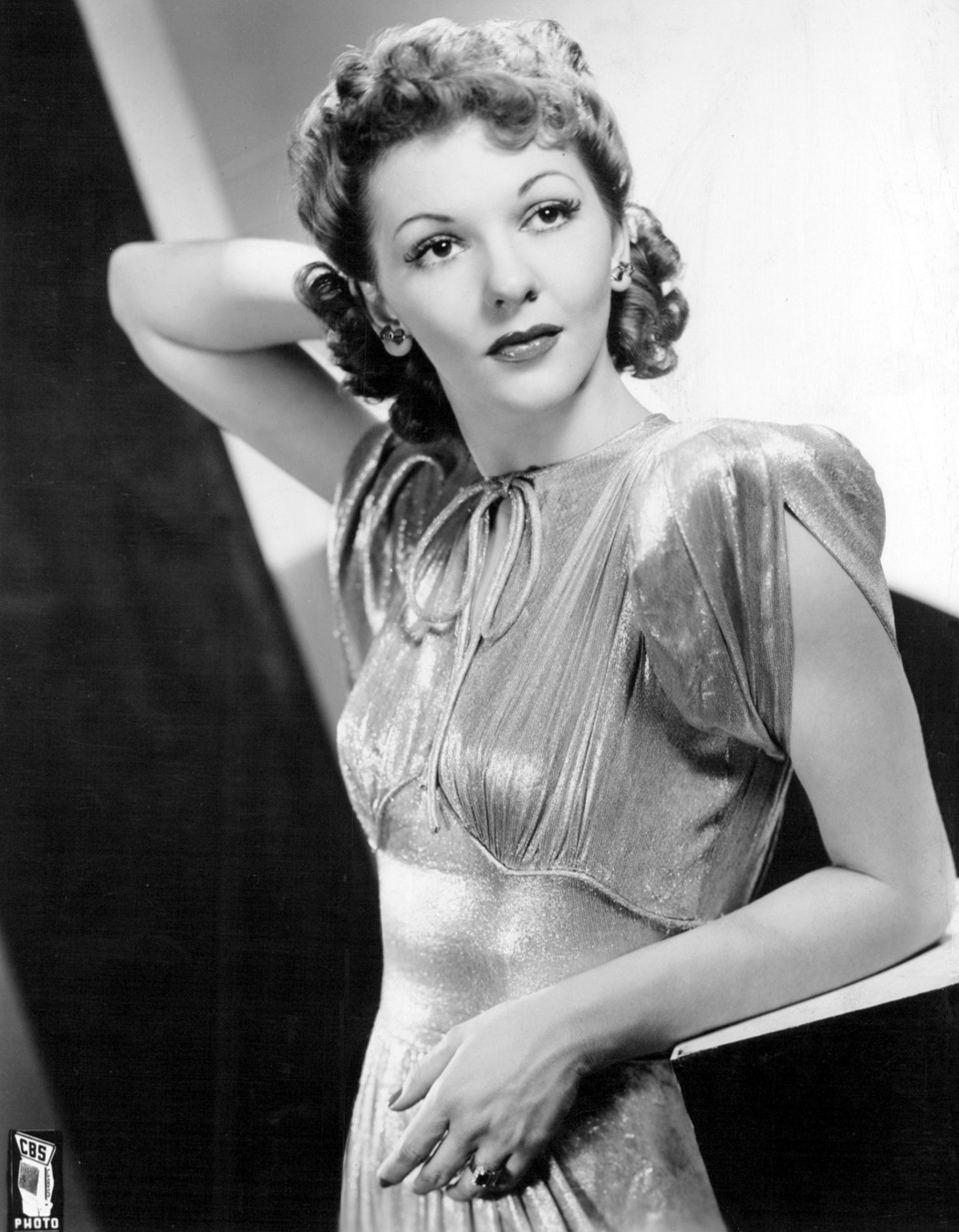
Mary Martin won three times: for South Pacific (1950), Peter Pan (1955), and The Sound of Music (1960)

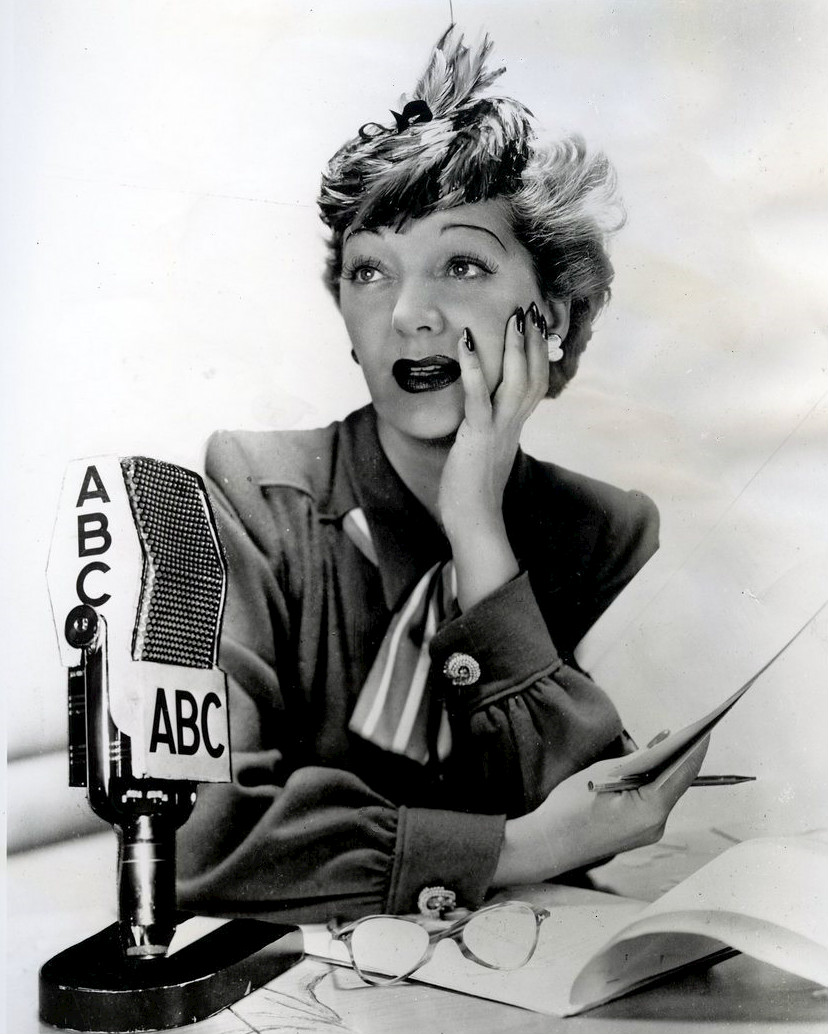
Gertrude Lawrence won for The King and I (1952)

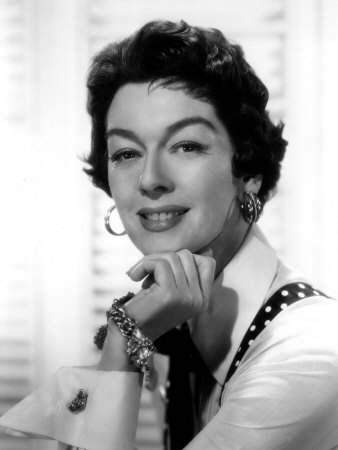
Rosalind Russell won for Wonderful Town (1953)

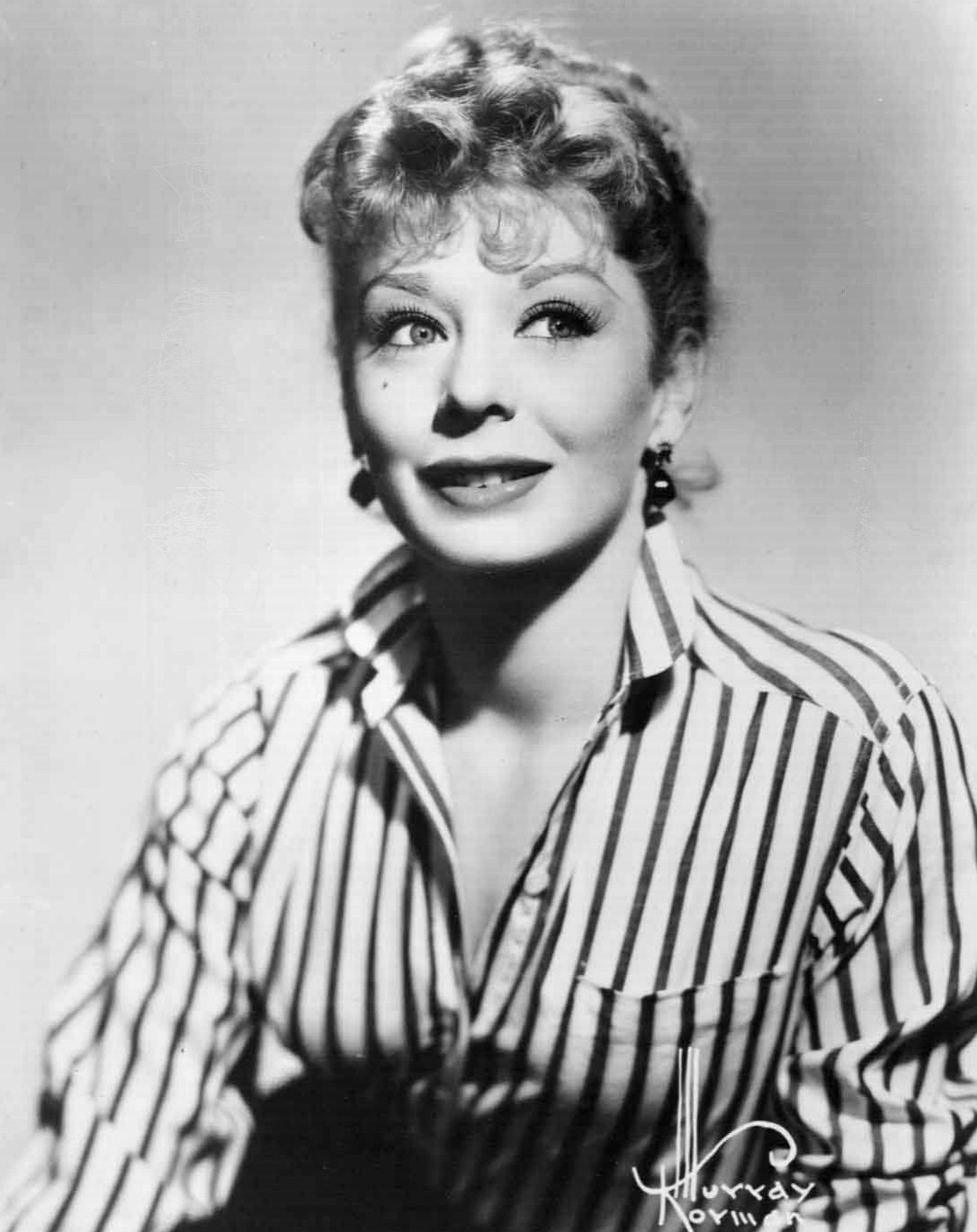
Gwen Verdon won for Damn Yankees (1956)

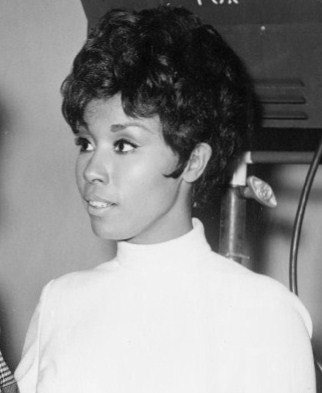
Diahann Carroll won for No Strings (1962)

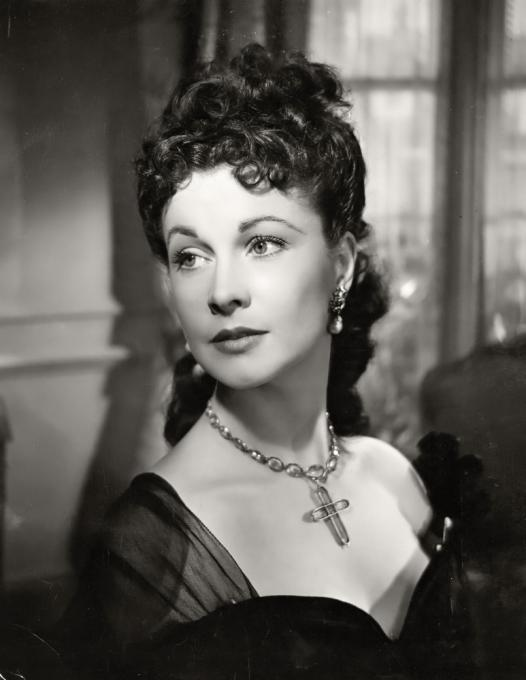
Vivien Leigh won for Tovarich (1963)

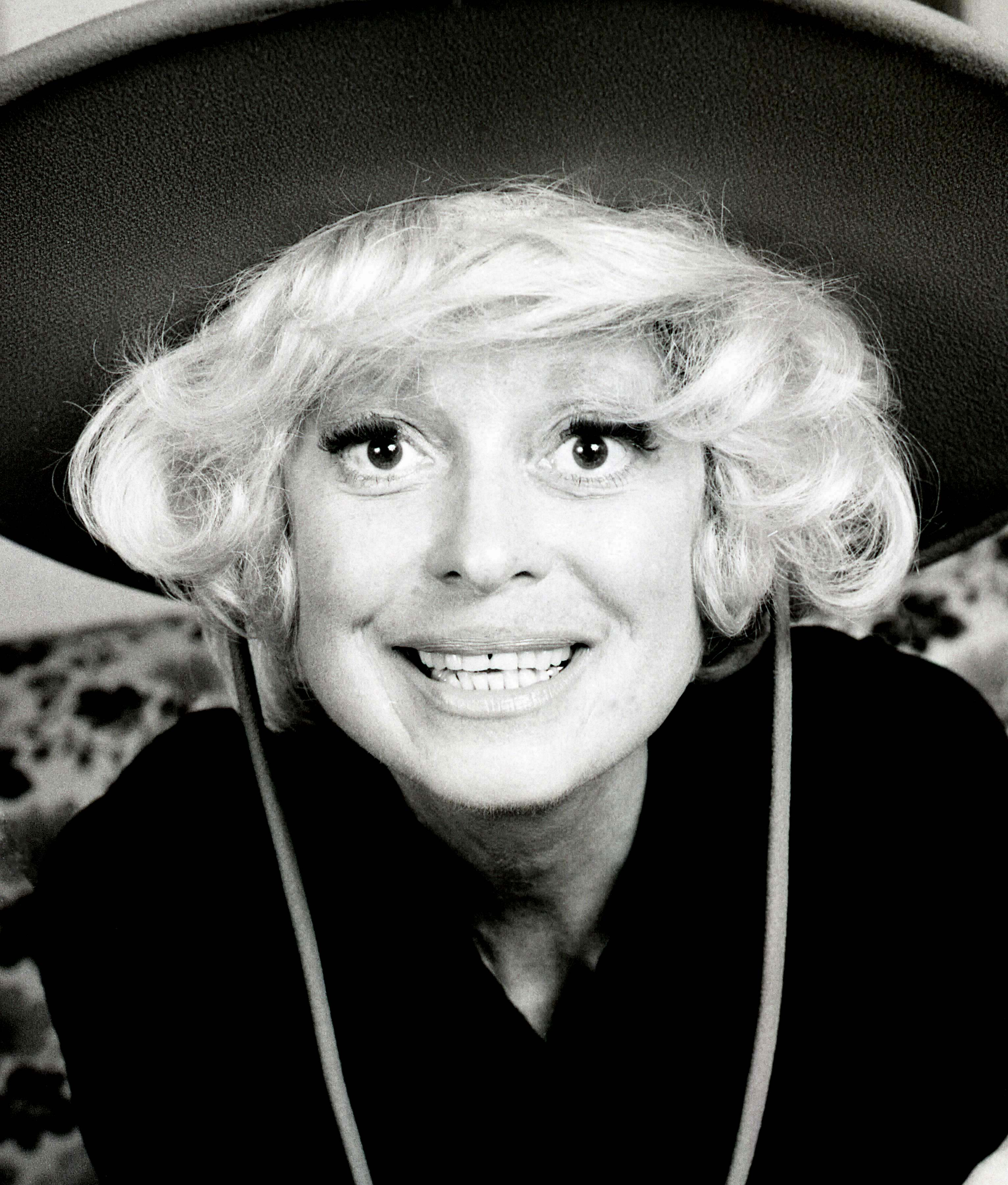
Carol Channing won for Hello, Dolly! (1964)

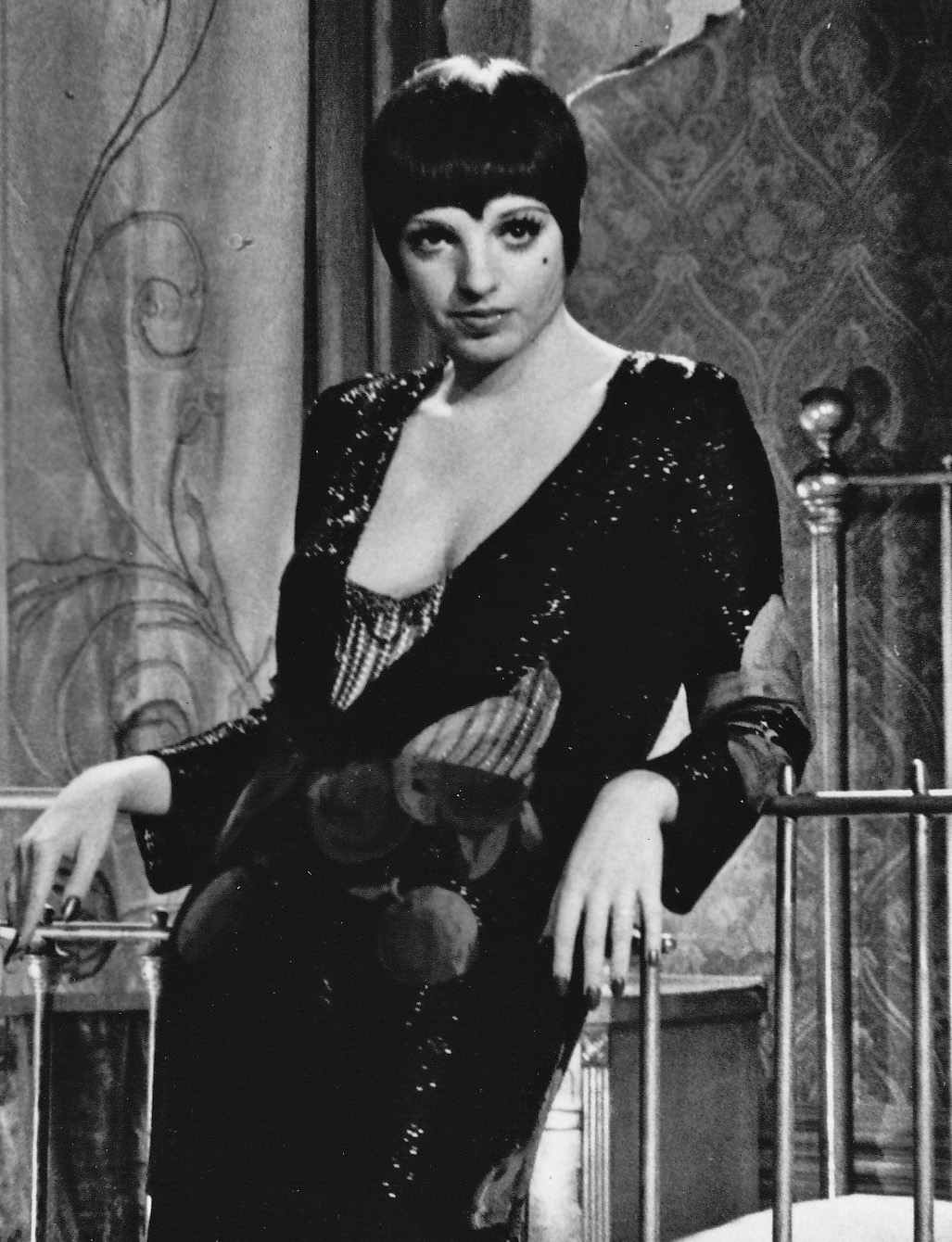
Liza Minnelli won twice: for Flora the Red Menace (1965) and The Act (1978)

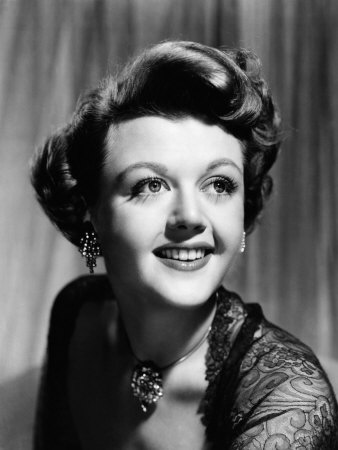
Angela Lansbury won four times: for Mame (1966), Dear World (1969), Gypsy (1975), and Sweeney Todd (1979)

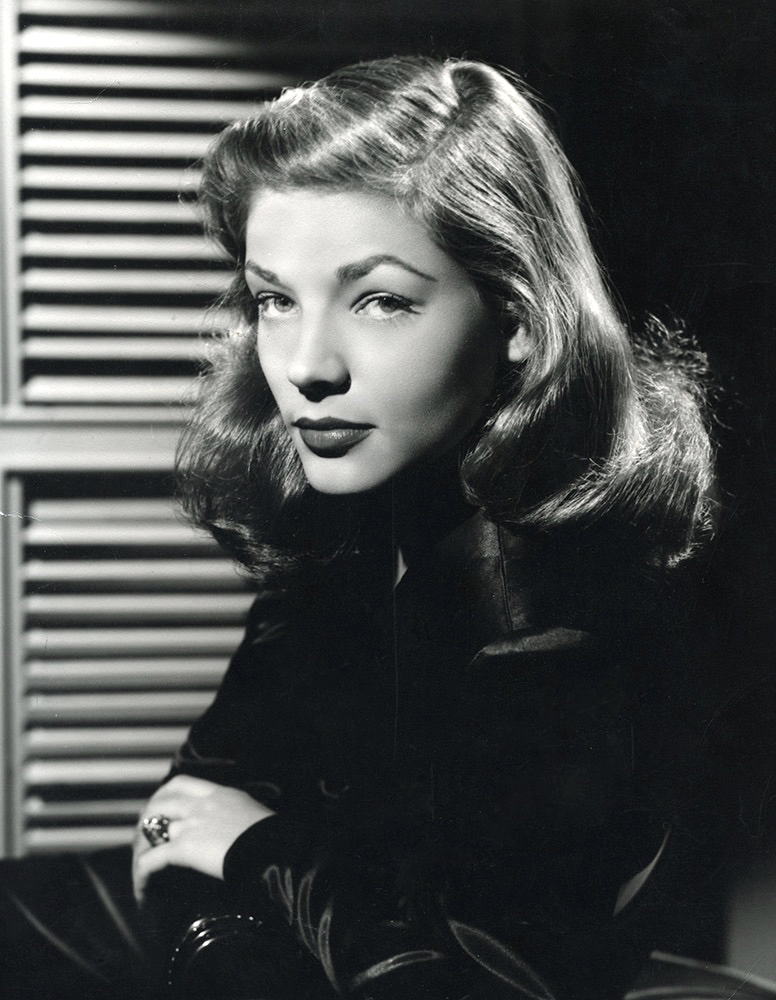
Lauren Bacall won twice: for Applause (1970) and Woman of the Year (1985)

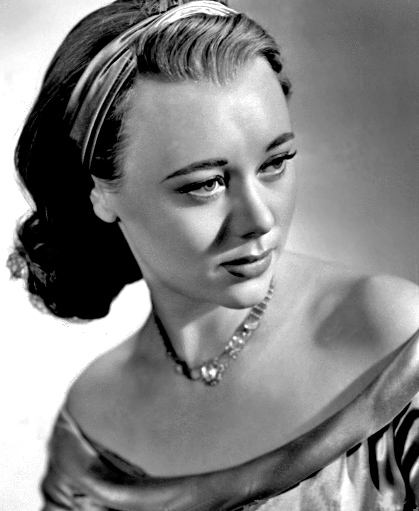
Glynis Johns won for A Little Night Music (1973)

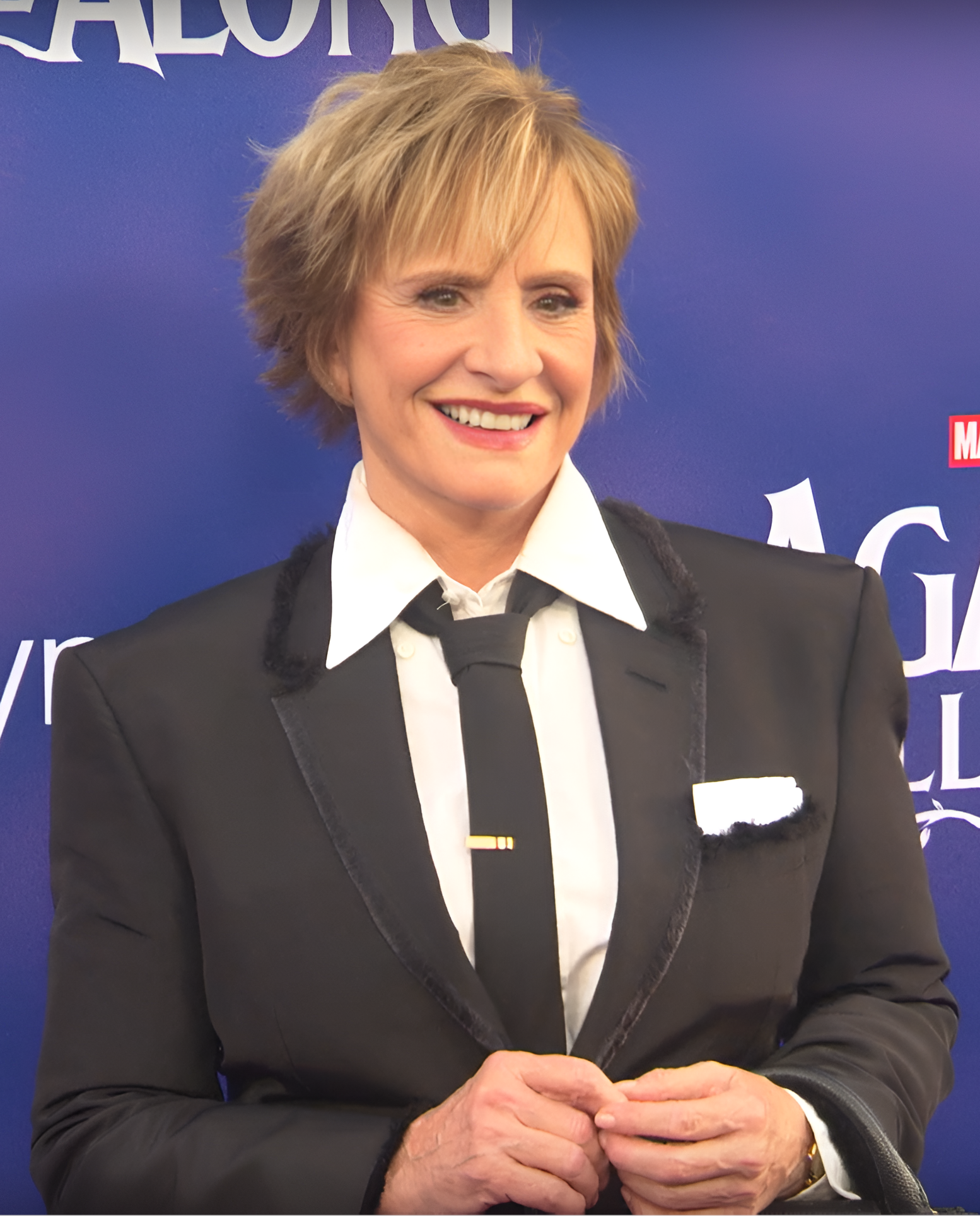
Patti LuPone won twice: for Evita (1980) and Gypsy (2008)

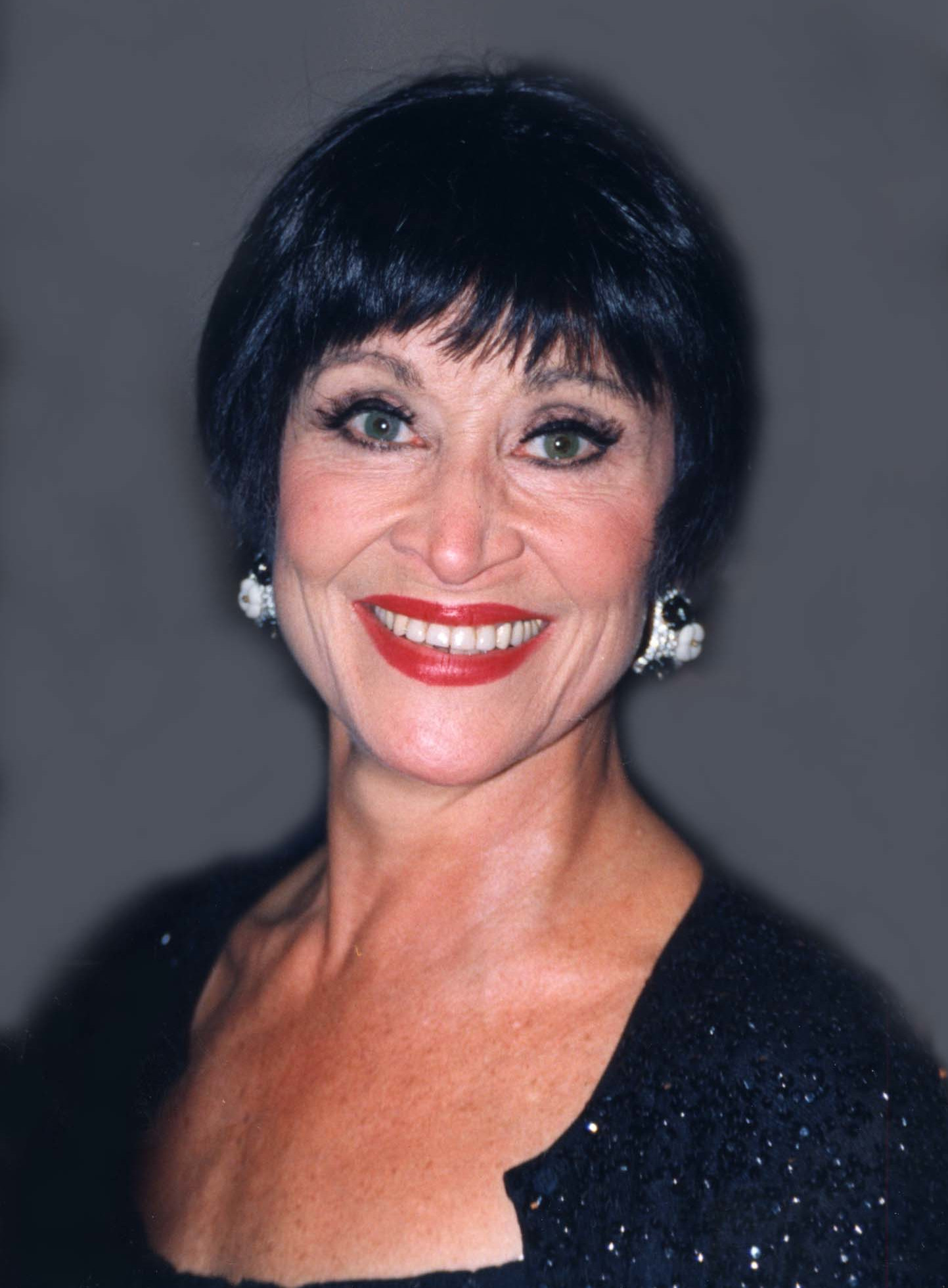
Chita Rivera won twice: for The Rink (1984) and Kiss of the Spider-Woman (1993)

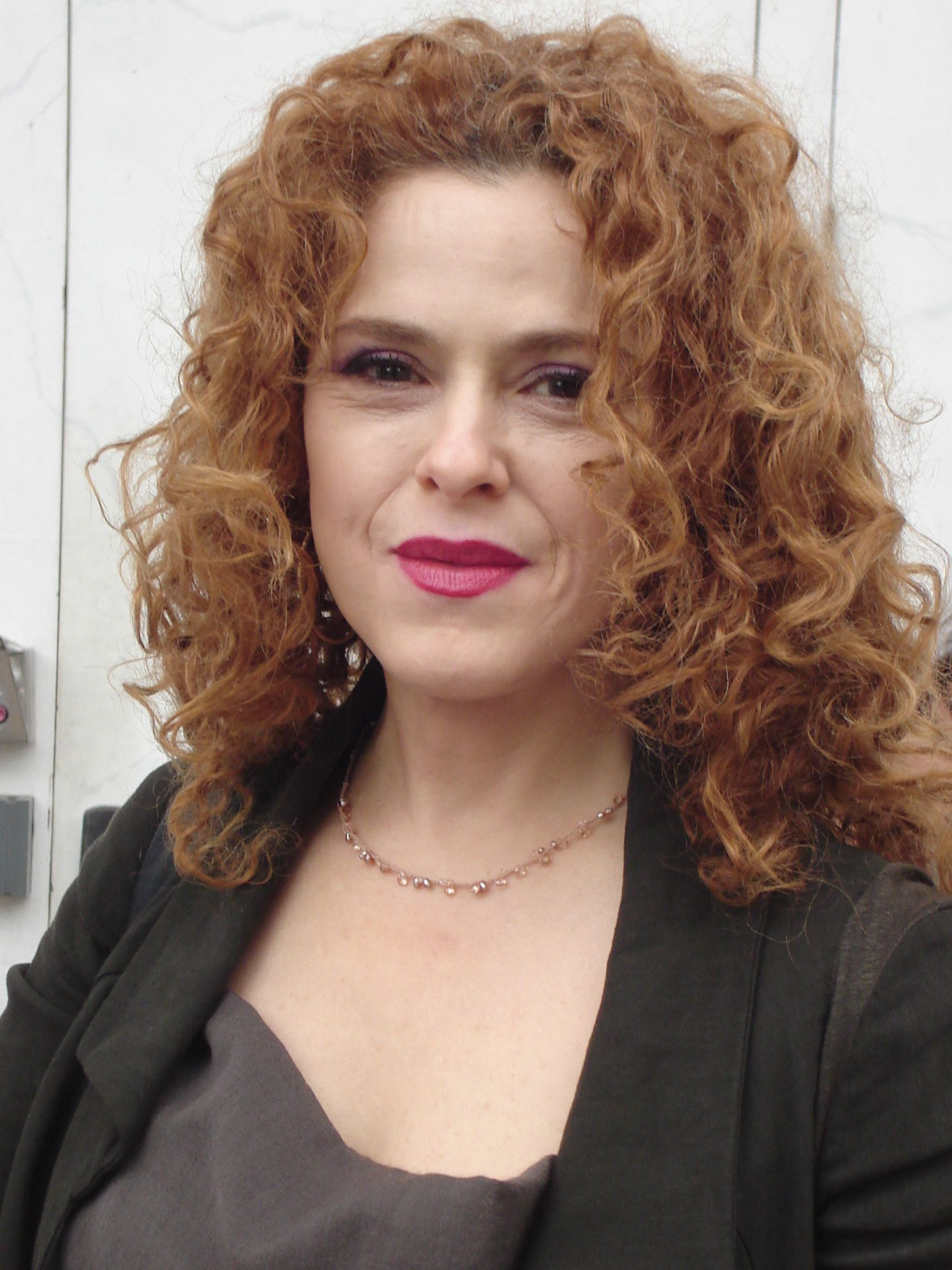
Bernadette Peters won twice: for Song and Dance (1986) and Annie Get Your Gun (1999)

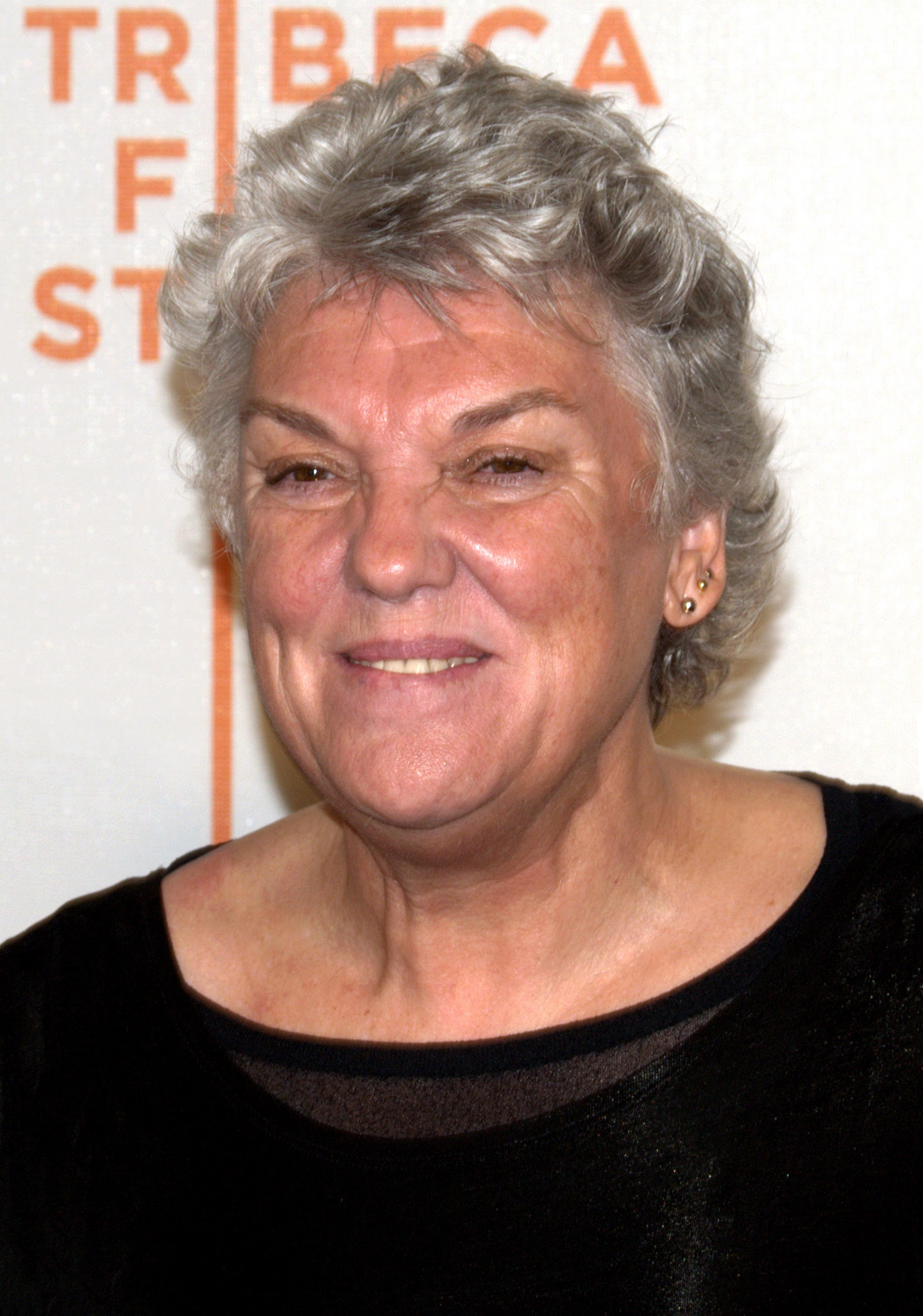
Tyne Daly won for Gypsy (1990)

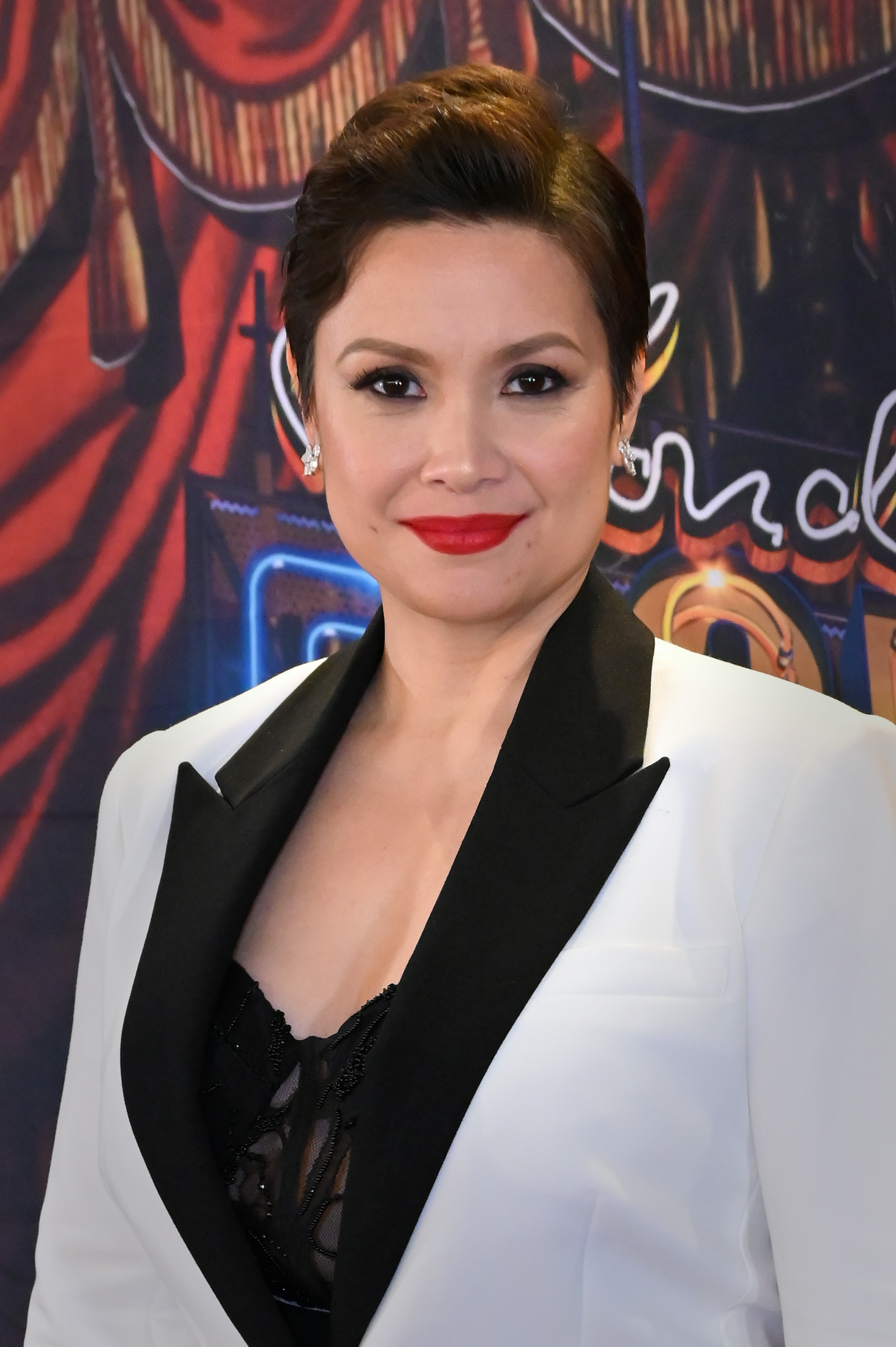
Lea Salonga won for Miss Saigon (1991)

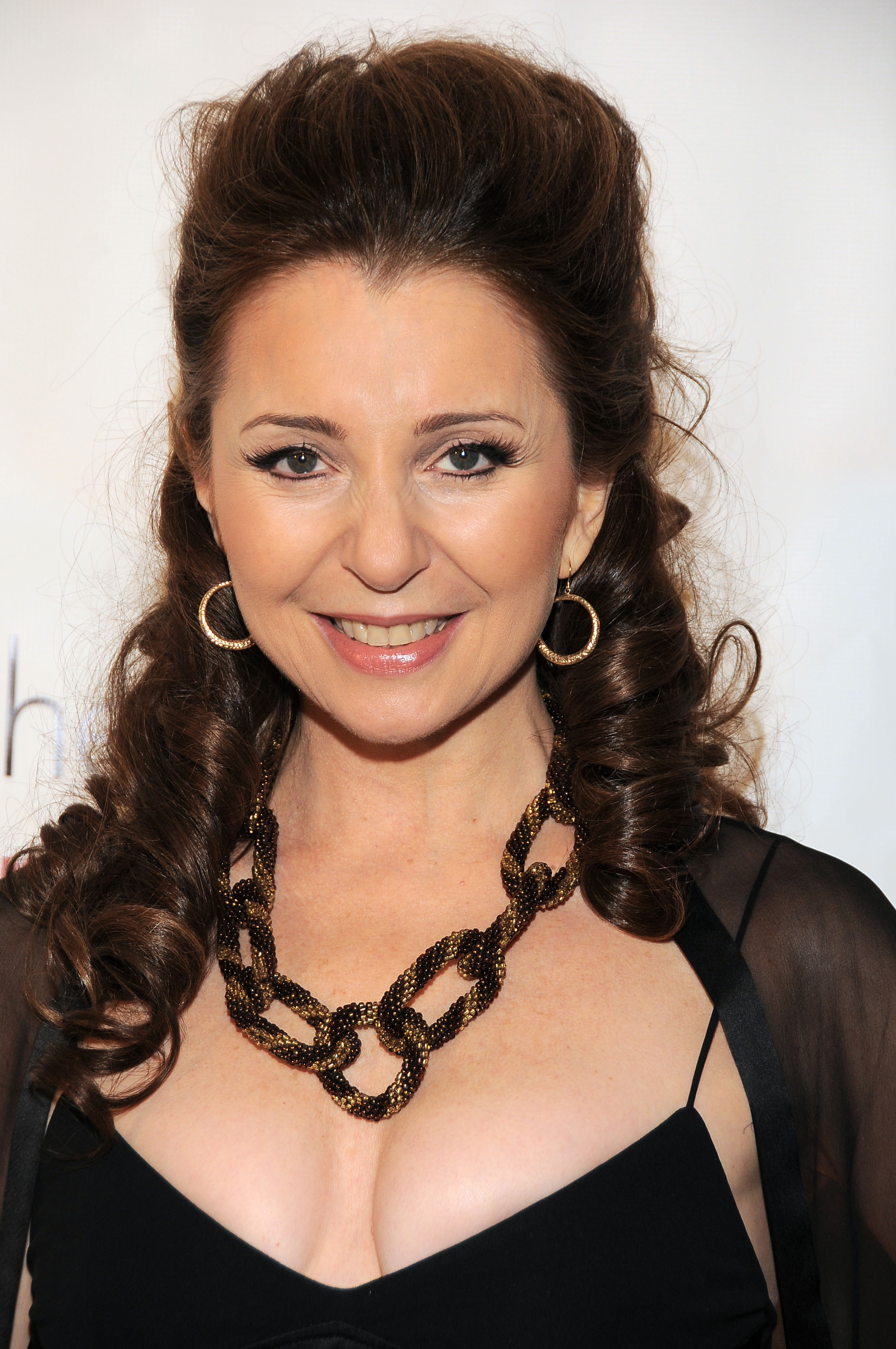
Donna Murphy won twice: for Passion (1994) and The King and I (1996)

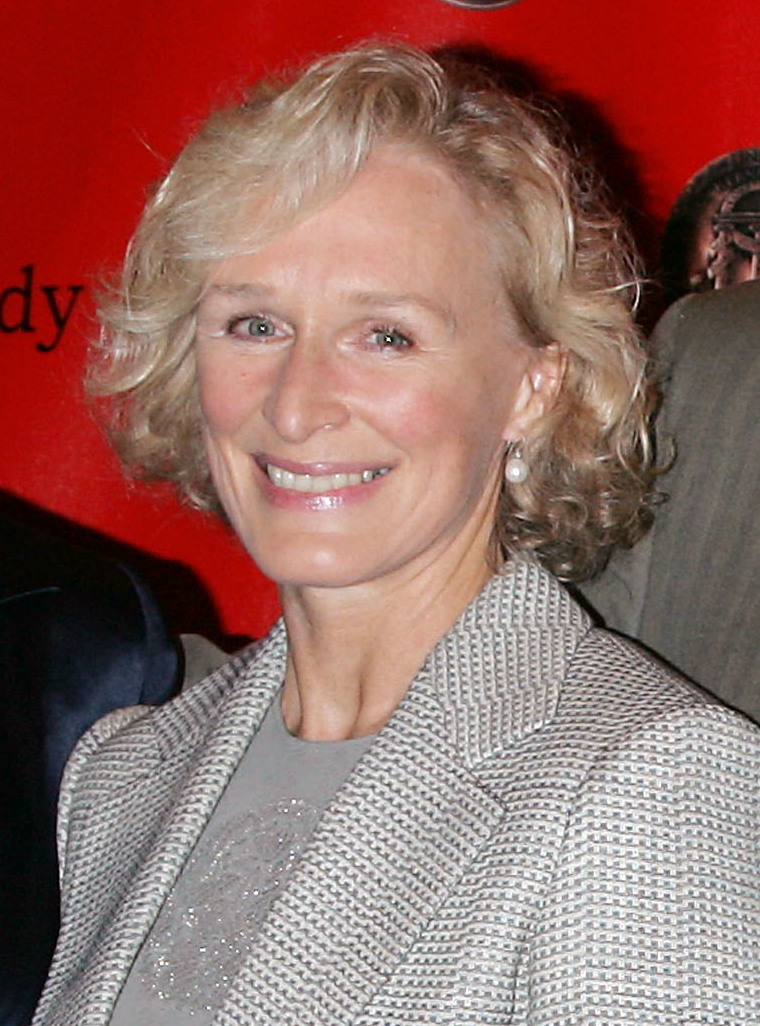
Glenn Close won for Sunset Boulevard (1995)

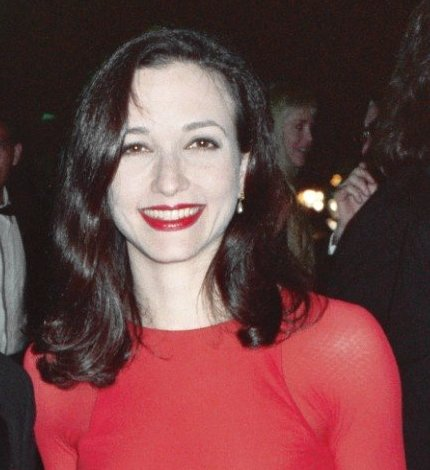
Bebe Neuwirth won for Chicago (1997)

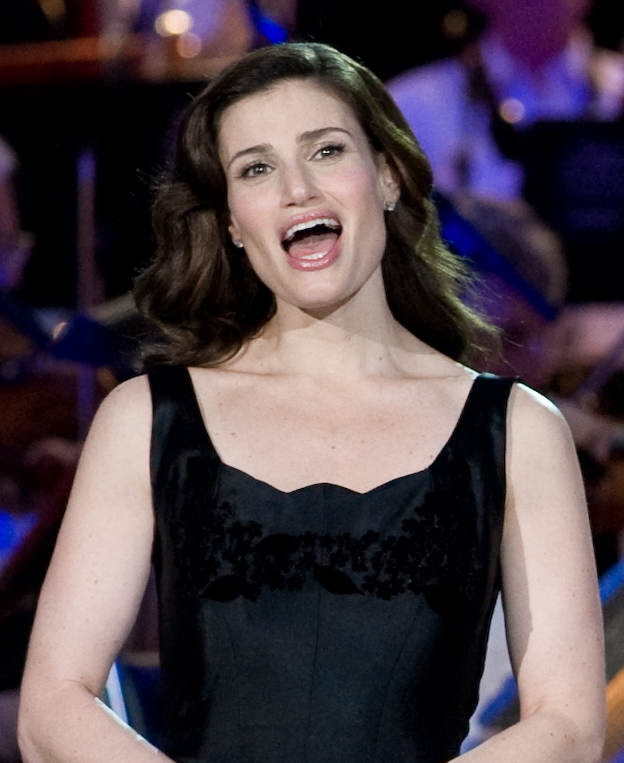
Idina Menzel won for Wicked (2004)

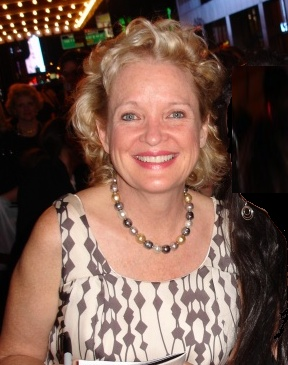
Christine Ebersole won twice: for 42nd Street (2001) and Grey Gardens (2007)

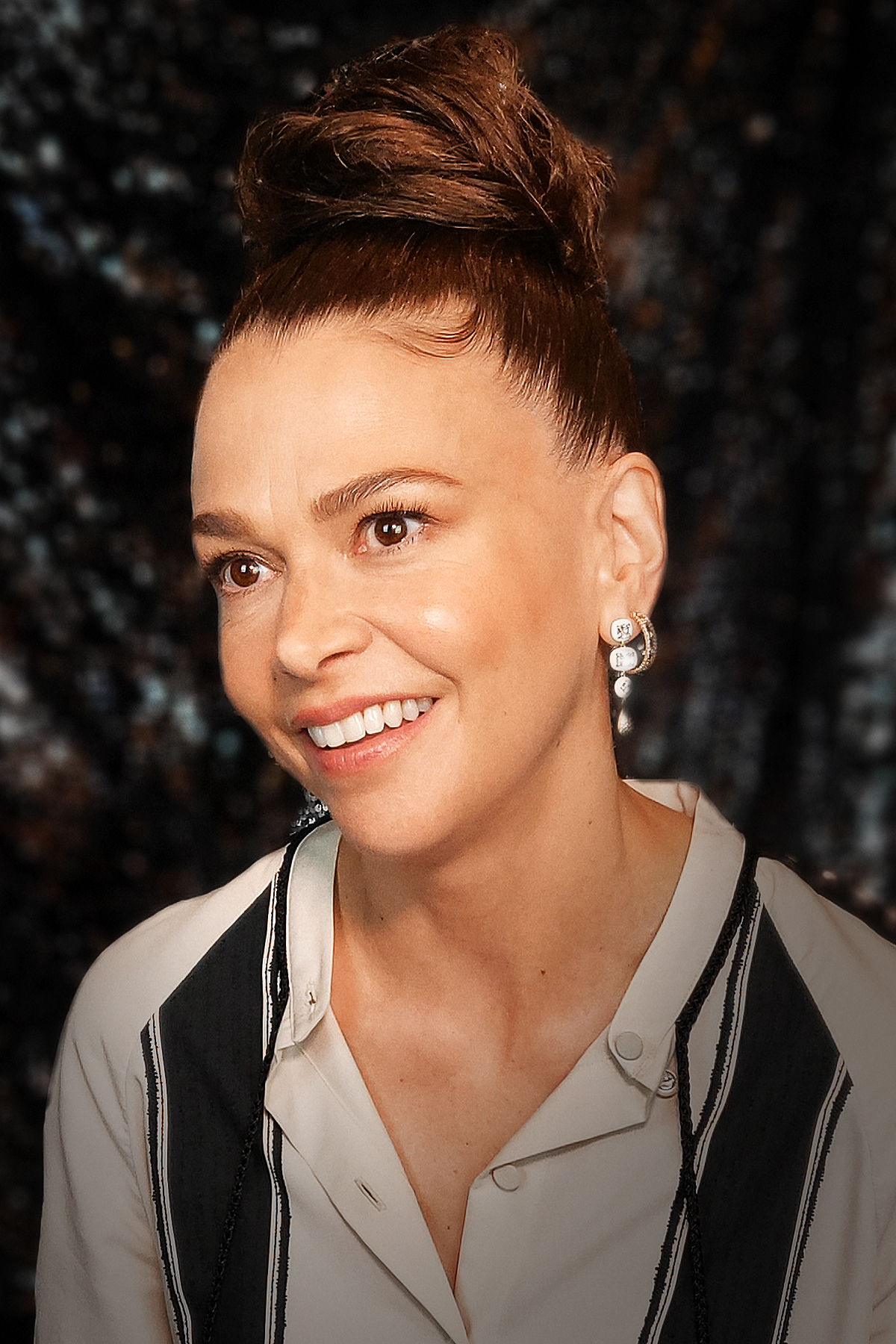
Sutton Foster won twice: for Thoroughly Modern Millie (2002) and Anything Goes (2011)

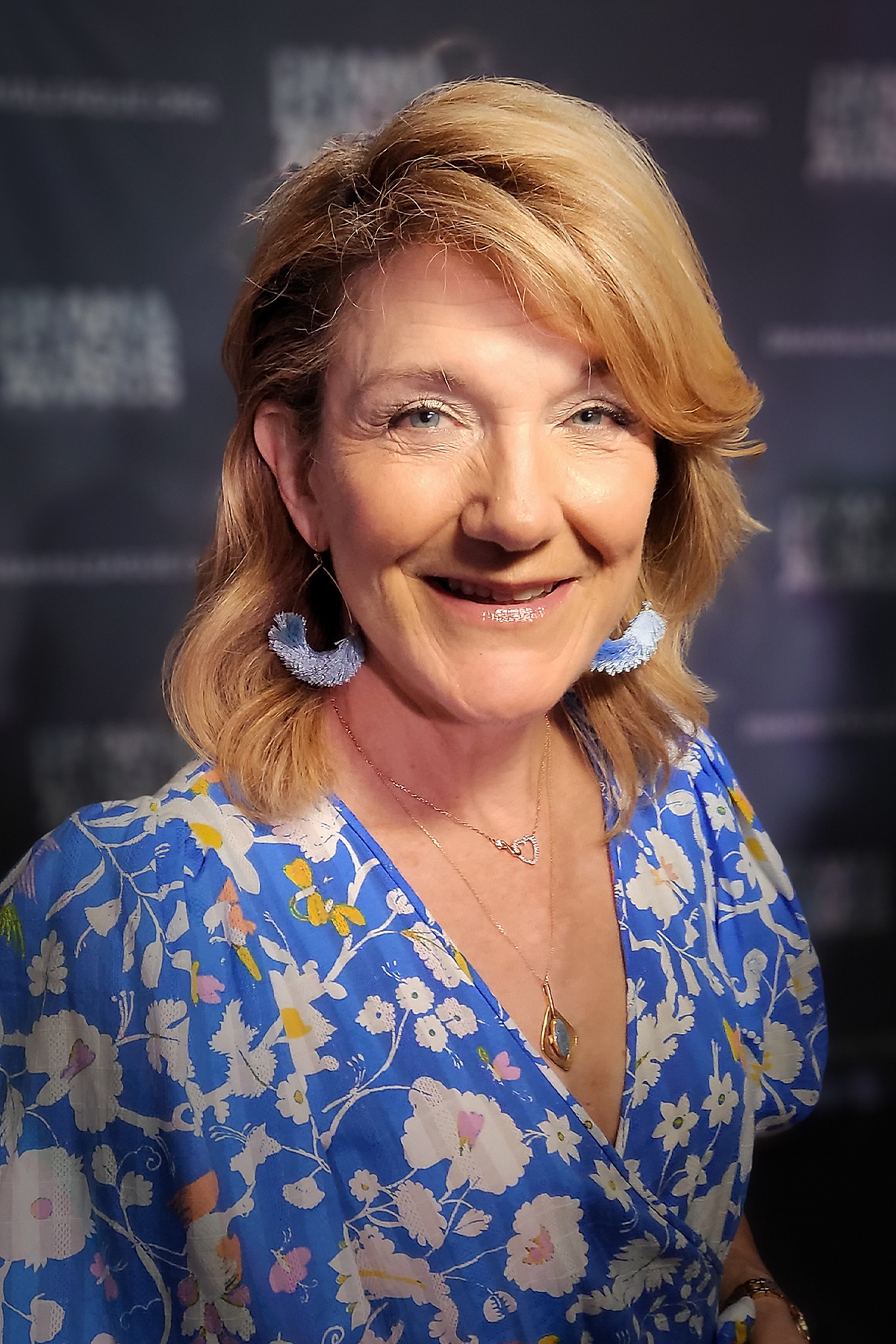
Victoria Clark won twice: for The Light in the Piazza (2005) and Kimberly Akimbo (2023)

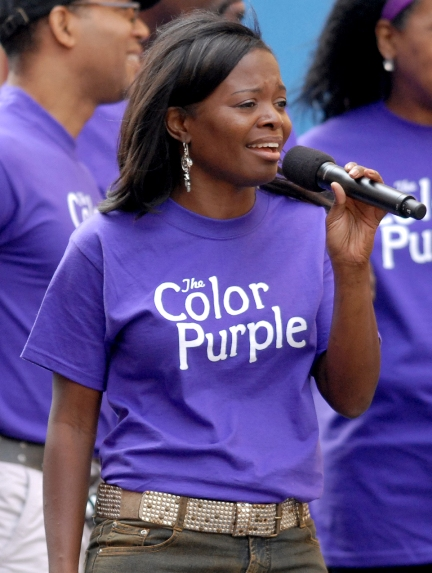
LaChanze won for The Color Purple (2006)

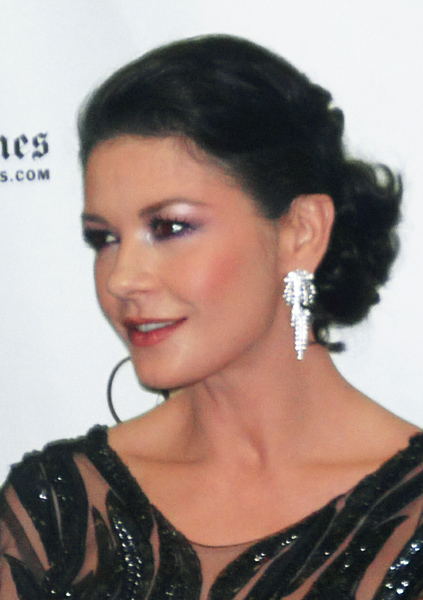
Catherine Zeta-Jones won for A Little Night Music (2010)

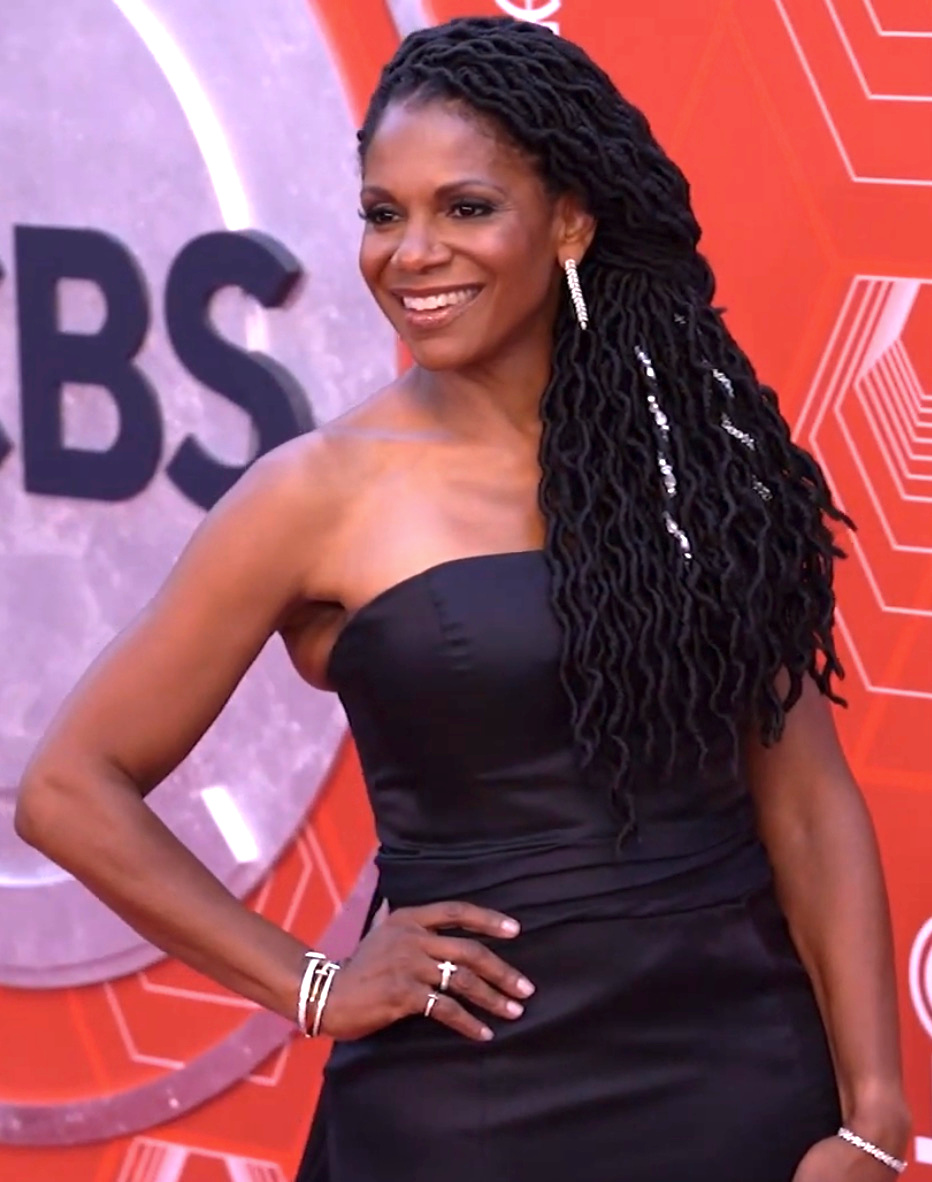
Audra McDonald won for Porgy and Bess (2012)

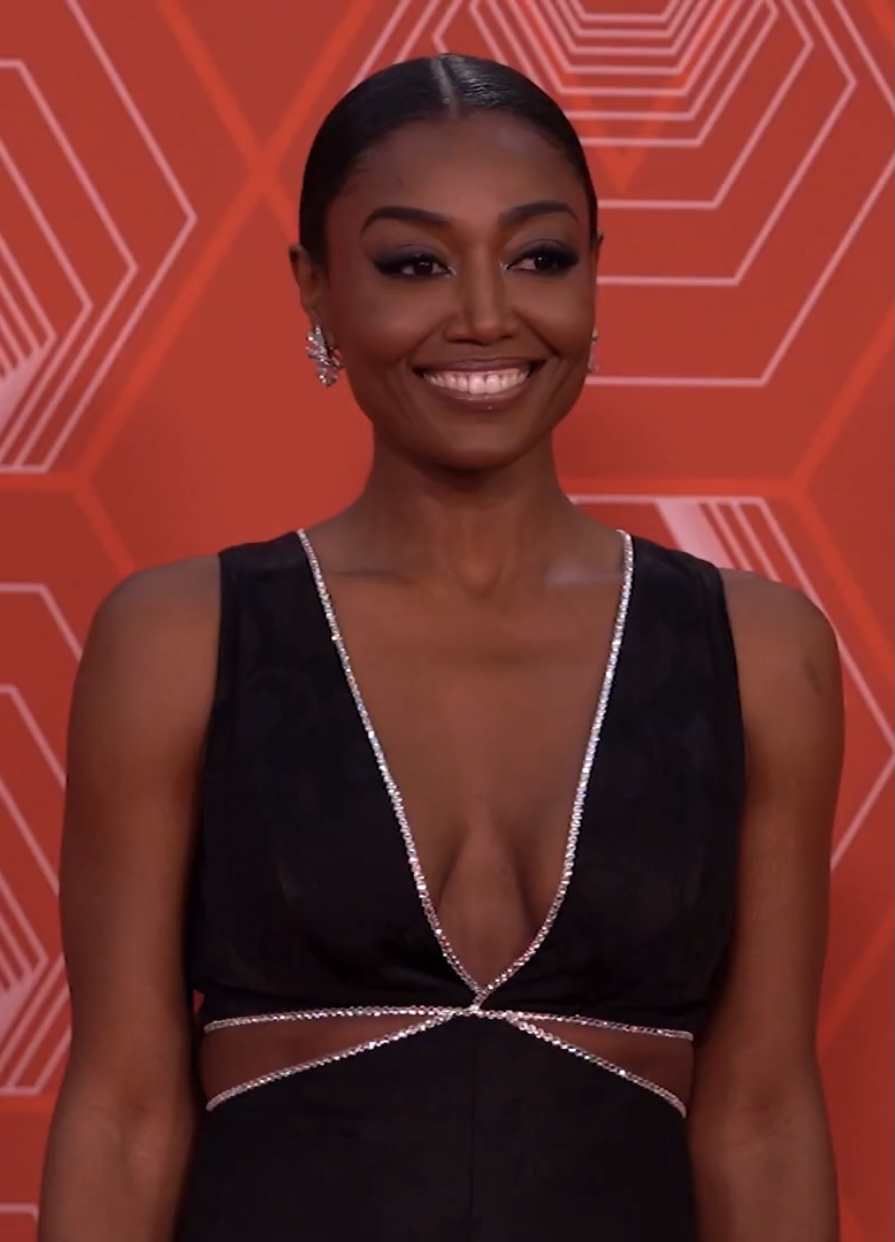
Patina Miller won for Pippin (2013)

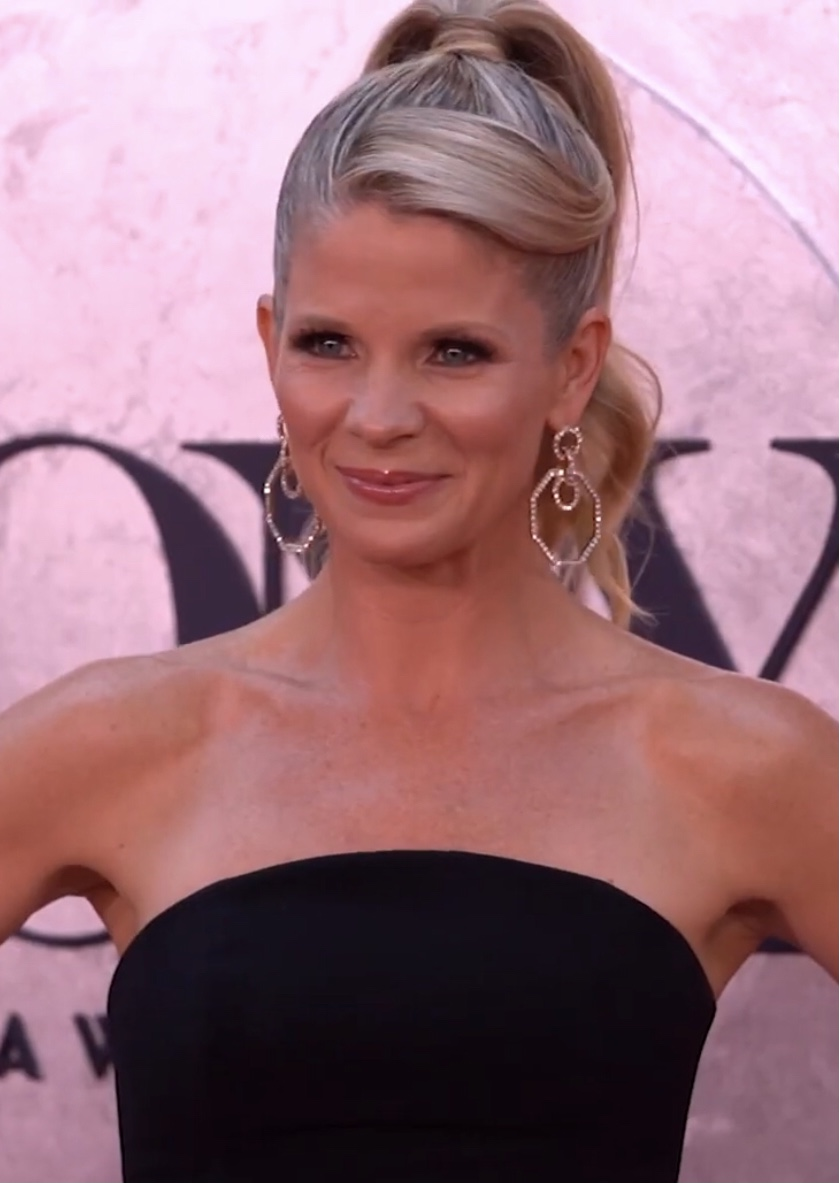
Kelli O'Hara won for The King and I (2015)

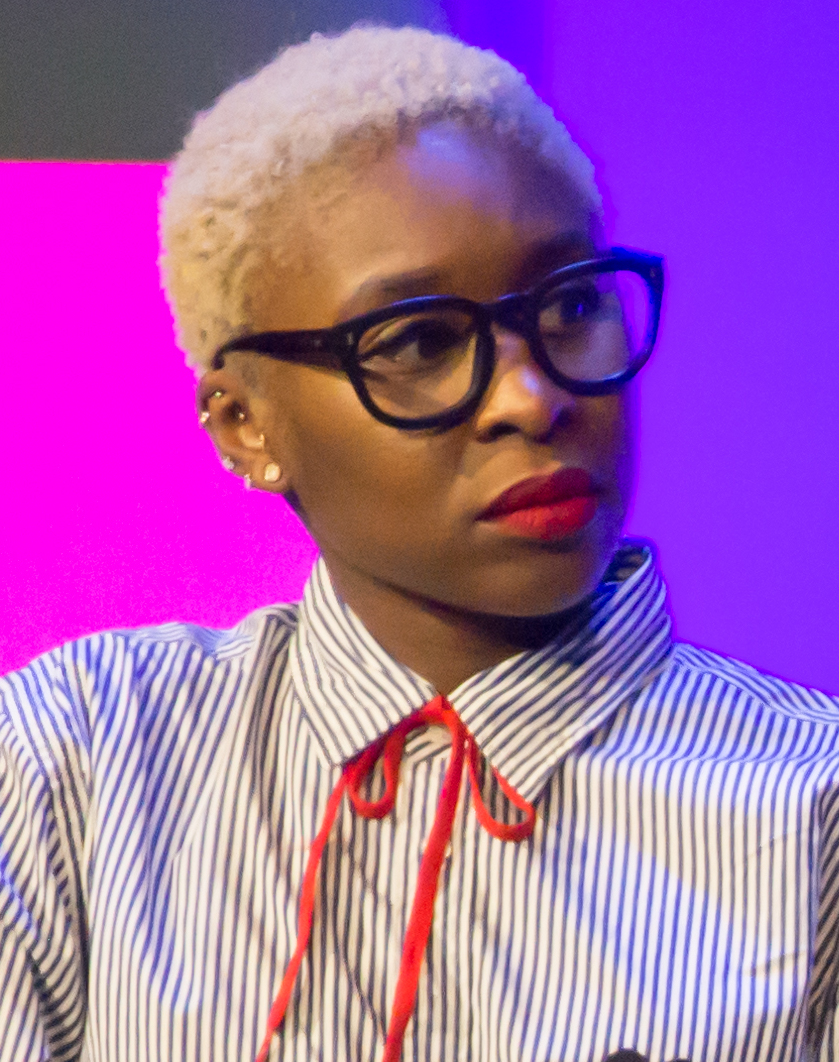
Cynthia Erivo won for The Color Purple (2016)

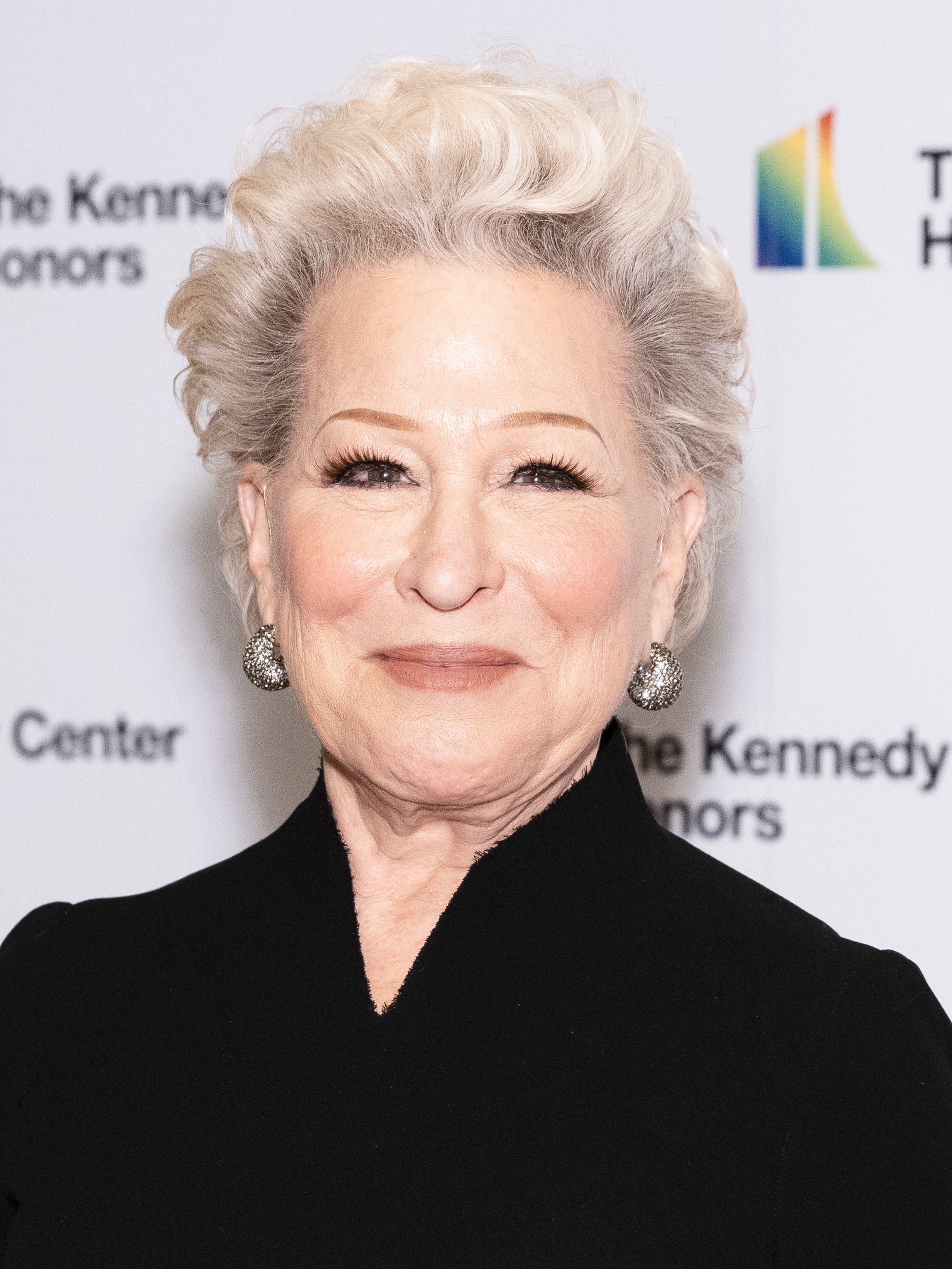
Bette Midler won for Hello Dolly! (2017)

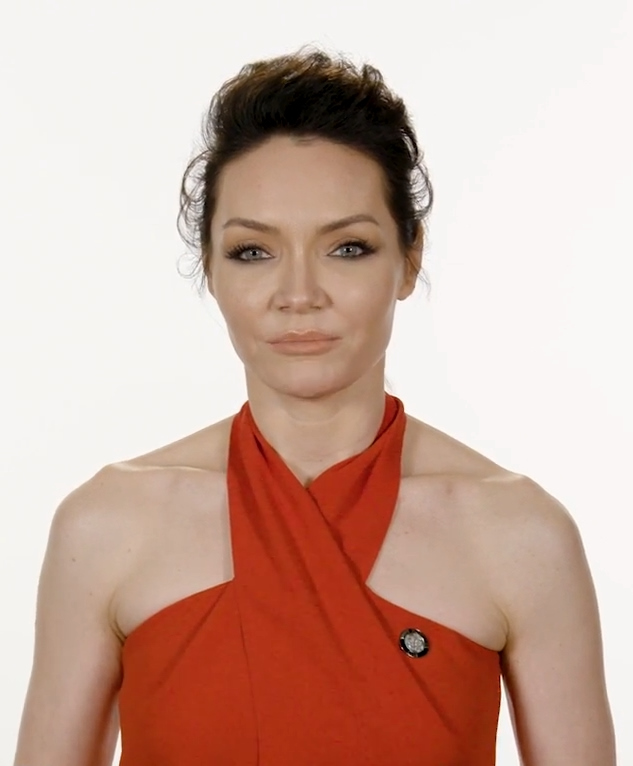
Katrina Lenk won for The Band's Visit (2018)

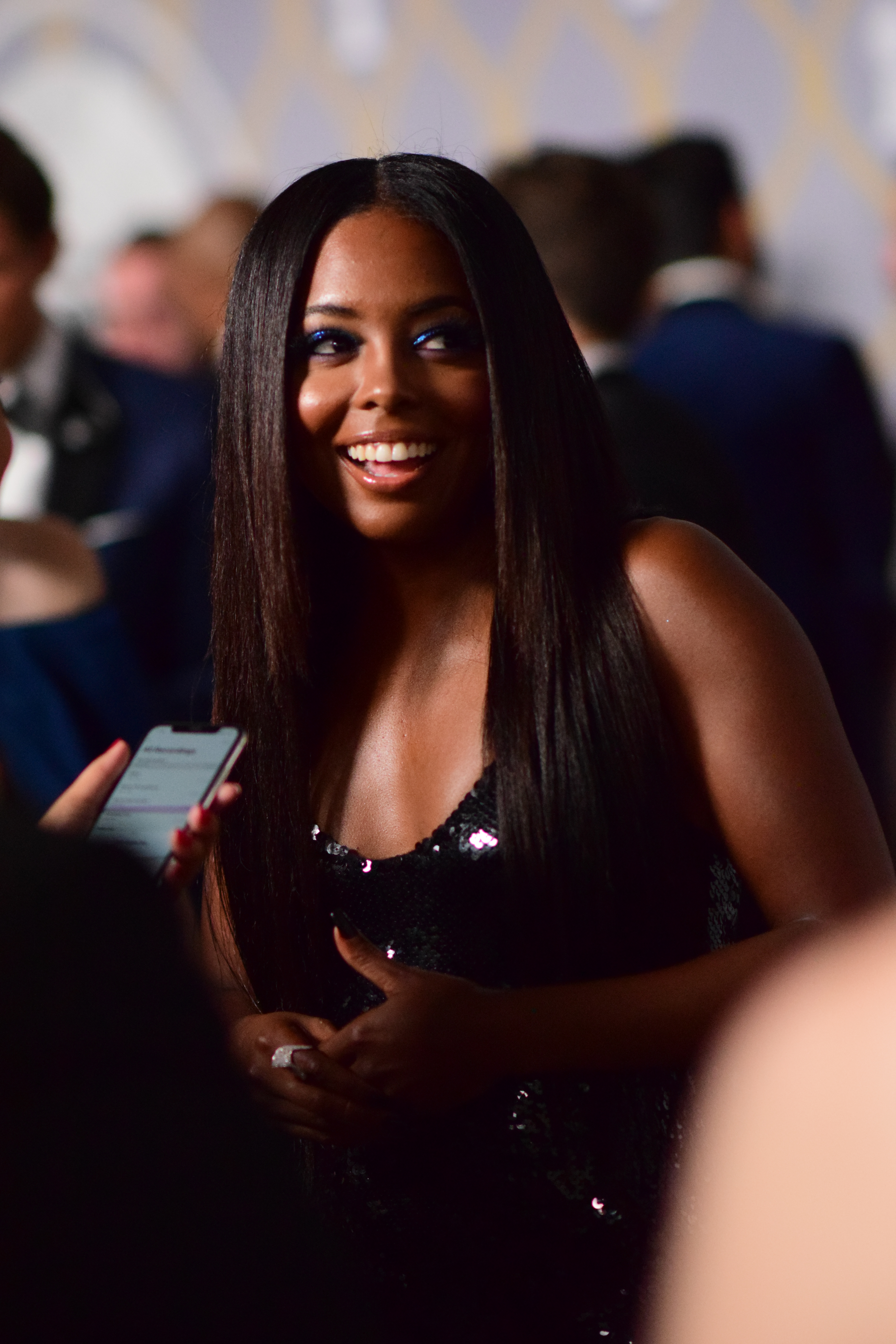
Adrienne Warren won for Tina - The Tina Turner Musical (2020)

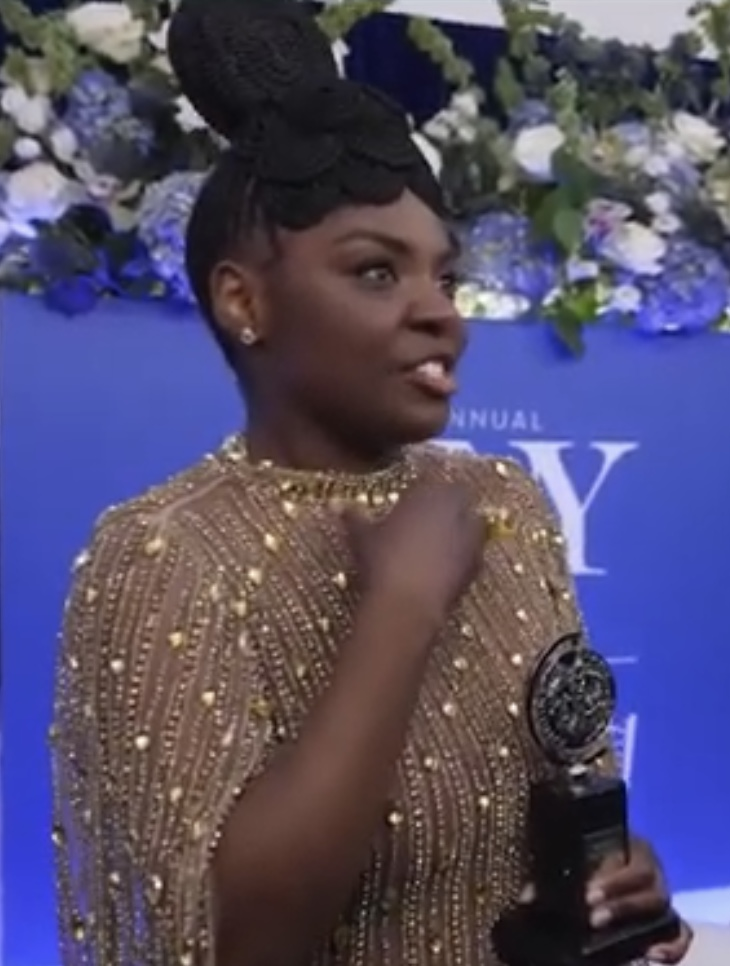
Joaquina Kalukango won for Paradise Square (2022)

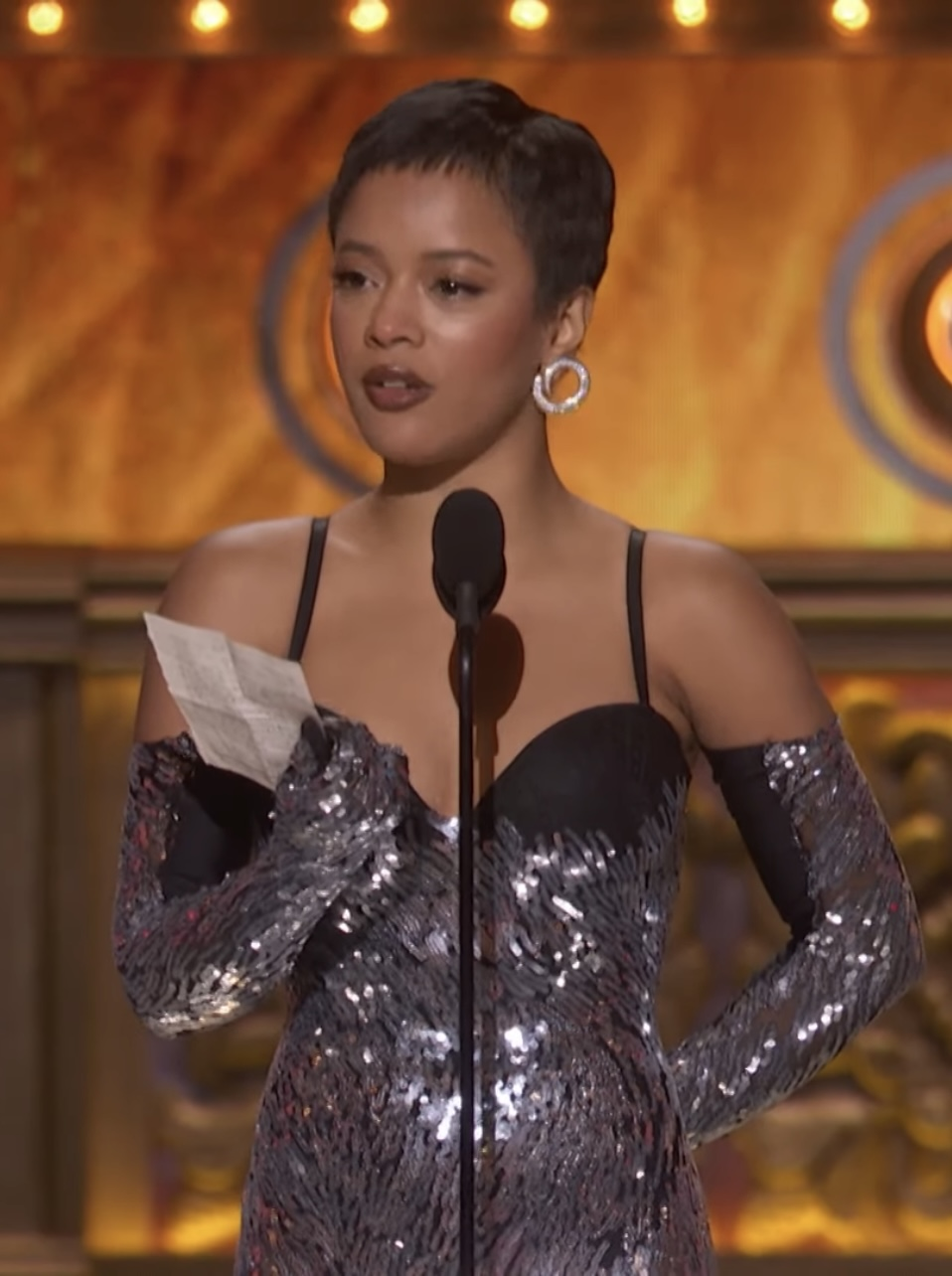
Maleah Joi Moon won for Hell's Kitchen (2024)

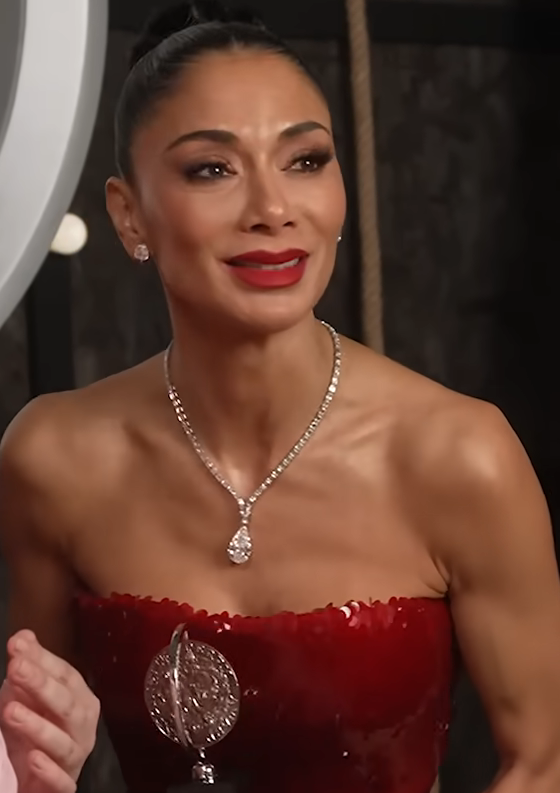
Nicole Scherzinger won for Sunset Blvd. (2025)

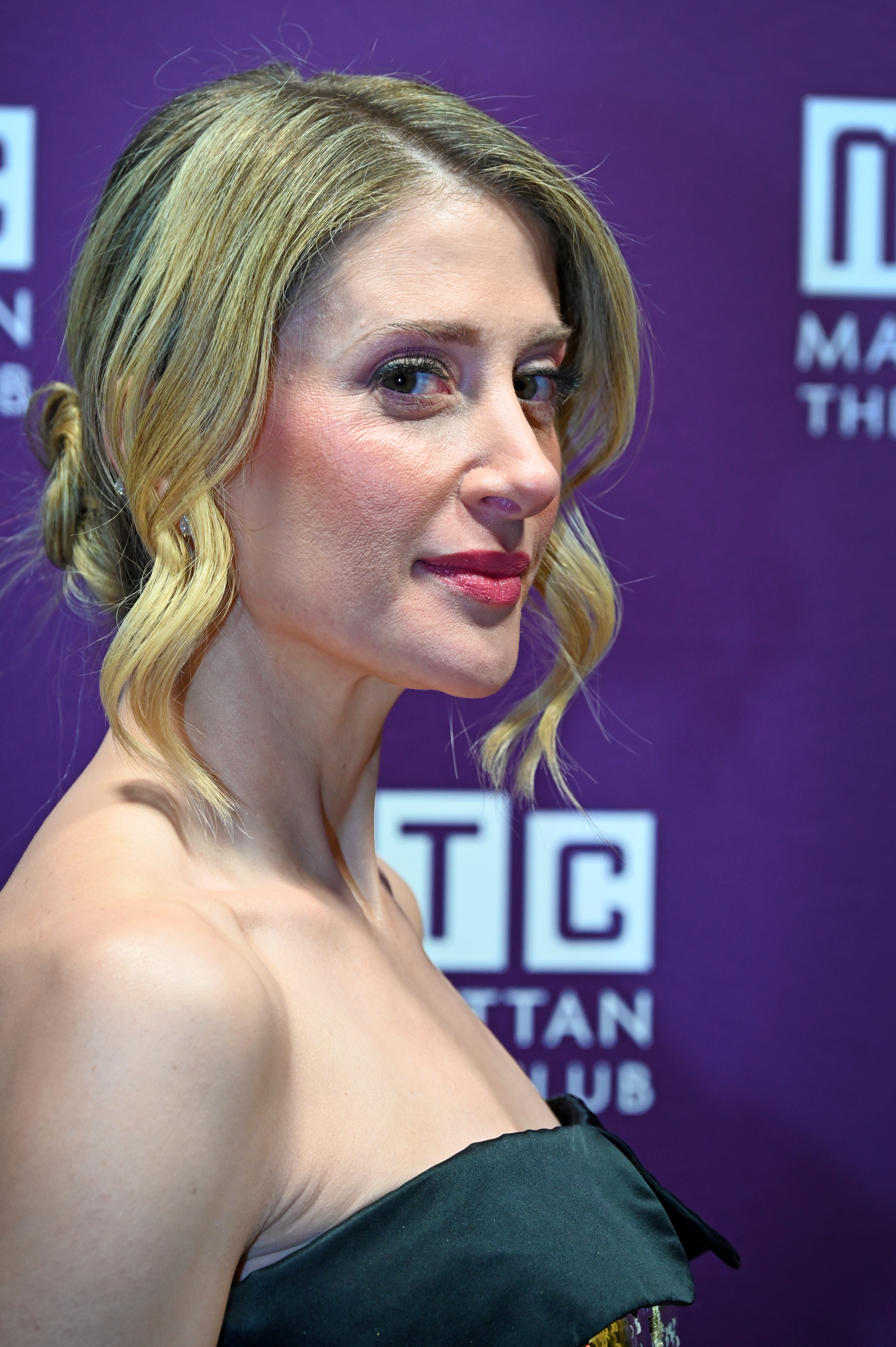
Caissie Levy won for Ragtime (2026)

=== 1940s ===
Year	Actress	Musical	Role(s)	Ref.
1947 (1st)	Not awarded			
1948 (2nd)
1948 (2nd)	Grace Hartman	Angel in the Wings	Nettie / Mrs. Blodgett / Ruth / Mrs. Hutchinson	
1949 (3rd)
1949 (3rd)	Nanette Fabray	Love Life	Susan Cooper	

=== 1950s ===
Year	Actress	Musical	Role(s)	Ref.
1950 (4th)
1950 (4th)	Mary Martin	South Pacific	Ensign Nellie Forbush	
1951 (5th)
1951 (5th)	Ethel Merman	Call Me Madam	Sally Adams	
1952 (6th)
1952 (6th)	Gertrude Lawrence	The King and I	Anna Leonowens	
1953 (7th)
1953 (7th)	Rosalind Russell	Wonderful Town	Ruth Sherwood	
1954 (8th)
1954 (8th)	Dolores Gray	Carnival in Flanders	Cornelia	
1955 (9th)
1955 (9th)	Mary Martin	Peter Pan	Peter Pan	
1956 (10th)
1956 (10th)	Gwen Verdon	Damn Yankees	Lola	
1956 (10th)	Carol Channing	The Vamp	Flora Weems / Delilah	
1956 (10th)	Nancy Walker	Phoenix '55	Various Characters	
1957 (11th)
1957 (11th)	Judy Holliday	Bells Are Ringing	Ella Peterson	
1957 (11th)	Julie Andrews	My Fair Lady	Eliza Doolittle	
1957 (11th)	Ethel Merman	Happy Hunting	Liz Livingstone	
1958 (12th)
1958 (12th)	Thelma Ritter	New Girl in Town	Marthy Owen	
1958 (12th)	Gwen Verdon	New Girl in Town	Anna Christopherson	
1958 (12th)	Lena Horne	Jamaica	Savannah	
1958 (12th)	Beatrice Lillie	Ziegfeld Follies of 1957	Various Characters	
1959 (13th)
1959 (13th)	Gwen Verdon	Redhead	Essie Whimple	
1959 (13th)	Miyoshi Umeki	Flower Drum Song	Mei-Li	

=== 1960s ===
Year	Actress	Musical	Role(s)	Ref.
1960 (14th)
1960 (14th)	Mary Martin	The Sound of Music	Maria von Trapp	
1960 (14th)	Carol Burnett	Once Upon a Mattress	Princess Winnifred	
1960 (14th)	Dolores Gray	Destry Rides Again	Frenchy	
1960 (14th)	Eileen Herlie	Take Me Along	Lily Miller	
1960 (14th)	Ethel Merman	Gypsy	Rose	
1961 (15th)
1961 (15th)	Elizabeth Seal	Irma La Douce	Irma La Douce	
1961 (15th)	Julie Andrews	Camelot	Guenevere	
1961 (15th)	Carol Channing	Show Girl	Various Characters	
1961 (15th)	Nancy Walker	Do Re Mi	Kay Cram	
1962 (16th)
1962 (16th)	Anna Maria Alberghetti (TIE)	Carnival!	Lili Daurier	
1962 (16th)	Diahann Carroll (TIE)	No Strings	Barbara Woodruff	
1962 (16th)	Molly Picon	Milk and Honey	Clara Weiss	
1962 (16th)	Elaine Stritch	Sail Away	Mimi Paragon	
1963 (17th)
1963 (17th)	Vivien Leigh	Tovarich	Tatiana Petrovna	
1963 (17th)	Georgia Brown	Oliver!	Nancy	
1963 (17th)	Nanette Fabray	Mr. President	Nell Henderson	
1963 (17th)	Sally Ann Howes	Brigadoon	Fiona MacLaren	
1964 (18th)
1964 (18th)	Carol Channing	Hello, Dolly!	Dolly Gallagher Levi	
1964 (18th)	Beatrice Lillie	High Spirits	Madame Arcati	
1964 (18th)	Barbra Streisand	Funny Girl	Fanny Brice	
1964 (18th)	Inga Swenson	110 in the Shade	Lizzie Curry	
1965 (19th)
1965 (19th)	Liza Minnelli	Flora the Red Menace	Flora Mezaros	
1965 (19th)	Elizabeth Allen	Do I Hear a Waltz?	Leona Samish	
1965 (19th)	Nancy Dussault	Bajour	Emily Kirsten	
1965 (19th)	Inga Swenson	Baker Street	Irene Adler	
1966 (20th)
1966 (20th)	Angela Lansbury	Mame	Mame Dennis	
1966 (20th)	Barbara Harris	On a Clear Day You Can See Forever	Daisy Gamble / Melinda Wells	
1966 (20th)	Julie Harris	Skyscraper	Georgina Allerton	
1966 (20th)	Gwen Verdon	Sweet Charity	Charity Hope Valentine	
1967 (21st)
1967 (21st)	Barbara Harris	The Apple Tree	Eve / Princess Barbara / Ella and Passionella	
1967 (21st)	Lotte Lenya	Cabaret	Fraulein Schneider	
1967 (21st)	Mary Martin	I Do! I Do!	She (Agnes)	
1967 (21st)	Louise Troy	Walking Happy	Maggie Hobson	
1968 (22nd)
1968 (22nd)	Patricia Routledge (TIE)	Darling of the Day	Alice Challice	
1968 (22nd)	Leslie Uggams (TIE)	Hallelujah, Baby!	Georgina	
1968 (22nd)	Melina Mercouri	Illya Darling	Illya	
1968 (22nd)	Brenda Vaccaro	How Now, Dow Jones	Cynthia Pike	
1969 (23rd)
1969 (23rd)	Angela Lansbury	Dear World	Countess Aurelia	
1969 (23rd)	Maria Karnilova	Zorba	Madame Hortense	
1969 (23rd)	Dorothy Loudon	The Fig Leaves Are Falling	Lillian Stone	
1969 (23rd)	Jill O'Hara	Promises, Promises	Fran Kubelik	

=== 1970s ===
Year	Actress	Musical	Role (s)	Ref.
1970 (24th)
1970 (24th)	Lauren Bacall	Applause	Margo Channing	
1970 (24th)	Katharine Hepburn	Coco	Coco Chanel	
1970 (24th)	Dilys Watling	Georgy	Georgina "Georgy" Parkin	
1971 (25th)
1971 (25th)	Helen Gallagher	No, No, Nanette	Lucille Early	
1971 (25th)	Susan Browning	Company	April	
1971 (25th)	Sandy Duncan	The Boy Friend	Maisie	
1971 (25th)	Elaine Stritch	Company	Joanne	
1972 (26th)
1972 (26th)	Alexis Smith	Follies	Phyllis Rogers Stone	
1972 (26th)	Jonelle Allen	Two Gentlemen of Verona	Silvia	
1972 (26th)	Dorothy Collins	Follies	Sally Durant Plummer	
1972 (26th)	Mildred Natwick	70, Girls, 70	Ida Dodd	
1973 (27th)
1973 (27th)	Glynis Johns	A Little Night Music	Desiree Armfeldt	
1973 (27th)	Leland Palmer	Pippin	Fastrada	
1973 (27th)	Debbie Reynolds	Irene	Irene O'Dare	
1973 (27th)	Marcia Rodd	Shelter	Maud	
1974 (28th)
1974 (28th)	Virginia Capers	Raisin	Lena Younger	
1974 (28th)	Carol Channing	Lorelei	Lorelei Lee	
1974 (28th)	Michele Lee	Seesaw	Gittel Mosca	
1975 (29th)
1975 (29th)	Angela Lansbury	Gypsy	Rose	
1975 (29th)	Lola Falana	Doctor Jazz	Edna Mae Sheridan	
1975 (29th)	Bernadette Peters	Mack & Mabel	Mabel Normand	
1975 (29th)	Ann Reinking	Goodtime Charley	Joan of Arc	
1976 (30th)
1976 (30th)	Donna McKechnie	A Chorus Line	Cassie Ferguson	
1976 (30th)	Vivian Reed	Bubbling Brown Sugar	Marsha / Young Irene	
1976 (30th)	Chita Rivera	Chicago	Velma Kelly	
1976 (30th)	Gwen Verdon	Chicago	Roxie Hart	
1977 (31st)
1977 (31st)	Dorothy Loudon	Annie	Miss Hannigan	
1977 (31st)	Clamma Dale	Porgy and Bess	Bess	
1977 (31st)	Ernestine Jackson	Guys and Dolls	Sarah Brown	
1977 (31st)	Andrea McArdle	Annie	Annie	
1978 (32nd)
1978 (32nd)	Liza Minnelli	The Act	Michelle Craig	
1978 (32nd)	Madeline Kahn	On the Twentieth Century	Lily Garland / Mildred Plotka	
1978 (32nd)	Eartha Kitt	Timbuktu!	Shaleem La Lume	
1978 (32nd)	Frances Sternhagen	Angel	Eliza Gant	
1979 (33rd)
1979 (33rd)	Angela Lansbury	Sweeney Todd: The Demon Barber of Fleet Street	Mrs. Lovett	
1979 (33rd)	Tovah Feldshuh	Saravá	Dona Flor	
1979 (33rd)	Dorothy Loudon	Ballroom	Bea Asher	
1979 (33rd)	Alexis Smith	Platinum	Lila Halliday	

=== 1980s ===
Year	Actress	Musical	Role(s)	Ref.
1980 (34th)
1980 (34th)	Patti LuPone	Evita	Eva Perón	
1980 (34th)	Christine Andreas	Oklahoma!	Laurey Williams	
1980 (34th)	Sandy Duncan	Peter Pan	Peter Pan	
1980 (34th)	Ann Miller	Sugar Babies	Ann	
1981 (35th)
1981 (35th)	Lauren Bacall	Woman of the Year	Tess Harding	
1981 (35th)	Meg Bussert	Brigadoon	Fiona MacLaren	
1981 (35th)	Chita Rivera	Bring Back Birdie	Rosie Alvarez	
1981 (35th)	Linda Ronstadt	The Pirates of Penzance	Mabel	
1982 (36th)
1982 (36th)	Jennifer Holliday	Dreamgirls	Effie White	
1982 (36th)	Lisa Mordente	Marlowe	Emelia Bossano	
1982 (36th)	Mary Gordon Murray	Little Me	Maybelle Schlumpfert / Belle Poitrine	
1982 (36th)	Sheryl Lee Ralph	Dreamgirls	Deena Jones	
1983 (37th)
1983 (37th)	Natalia Makarova	On Your Toes	Vera Barnova	
1983 (37th)	Lonette McKee	Show Boat	Julie La Verne	
1983 (37th)	Chita Rivera	Merlin	The Queen	
1983 (37th)	Twiggy	My One and Only	Edith Herbert	
1984 (38th)
1984 (38th)	Chita Rivera	The Rink	Anna	
1984 (38th)	Rhetta Hughes	Amen Corner	Sister Margaret Alexander	
1984 (38th)	Liza Minnelli	The Rink	Angel	
1984 (38th)	Bernadette Peters	Sunday in the Park with George	Dot / Marie	
1985 (39th)	Not awarded (Note: The category was not given due to an insufficient number of musicals during the season.)			
1986 (40th)
1986 (40th)	Bernadette Peters	Song and Dance	Emma	
1986 (40th)	Debbie Allen	Sweet Charity	Charity Hope Valentine	
1986 (40th)	Cleo Laine	The Mystery of Edwin Drood	Angela Prysock / The Princess Puffer	
1986 (40th)	Chita Rivera	Jerry's Girls	Various Characters	
1987 (41st)
1987 (41st)	Maryann Plunkett	Me and My Girl	Sally Smith	
1987 (41st)	Catherine Cox	Oh, Coward!	Various Characters	
1987 (41st)	Teresa Stratas	Rags	Rebecca Hershkowitz	
1988 (42nd)
1988 (42nd)	Joanna Gleason	Into the Woods	The Baker's Wife	
1988 (42nd)	Alison Fraser	Romance/Romance	Josefine Weninger / Monica	
1988 (42nd)	Judy Kuhn	Chess	Florence Vassy	
1988 (42nd)	Patti LuPone	Anything Goes	Reno Sweeney	
1989 (43rd)
1989 (43rd)	Ruth Brown	Black and Blue	Various Characters	
1989 (43rd)	Charlotte d'Amboise	Jerome Robbins' Broadway	Anita / Peter Pan / Company	
1989 (43rd)	Linda Hopkins	Black and Blue	Various Characters	
1989 (43rd)	Sharon McNight	Starmites	Diva / Mother	

=== 1990s ===
Year	Actress	Musical	Role(s)	Ref.
1990 (44th)
1990 (44th)	Tyne Daly	Gypsy	Rose	
1990 (44th)	Georgia Brown	The Threepenny Opera	Celia Peachum	
1990 (44th)	Beth Fowler	Sweeney Todd: The Demon Barber of Fleet Street	Mrs. Lovett	
1990 (44th)	Liliane Montevecchi	Grand Hotel	Elizaveta Grushinskaya	
1991 (45th)
1991 (45th)	Lea Salonga	Miss Saigon	Kim	
1991 (45th)	June Angela	Shōgun: The Musical	Lady Mariko	
1991 (45th)	Dee Hoty	The Will Rogers Follies	Betty Blake	
1991 (45th)	Cathy Rigby	Peter Pan	Peter Pan	
1992 (46th)
1992 (46th)	Faith Prince	Guys and Dolls	Miss Adelaide	
1992 (46th)	Jodi Benson	Crazy for You	Polly Baker	
1992 (46th)	Josie de Guzman	Guys and Dolls	Sarah Brown	
1992 (46th)	Sophie Hayden	The Most Happy Fella	Rosabella	
1993 (47th)
1993 (47th)	Chita Rivera	Kiss of the Spider Woman	Aurora / Spider Woman	
1993 (47th)	Ann Crumb	Anna Karenina	Anna Karenina	
1993 (47th)	Stephanie Lawrence	Blood Brothers	Mrs. Johnstone	
1993 (47th)	Bernadette Peters	The Goodbye Girl	Paula McFadden	
1994 (48th)
1994 (48th)	Donna Murphy	Passion	Fosca	
1994 (48th)	Susan Egan	Beauty and the Beast	Belle	
1994 (48th)	Dee Hoty	The Best Little Whorehouse Goes Public	Mona Stangley	
1994 (48th)	Judy Kuhn	She Loves Me	Amalia Balash	
1995 (49th)
1995 (49th)	Glenn Close	Sunset Boulevard	Norma Desmond	
1995 (49th)	Rebecca Luker	Show Boat	Magnolia Hawks	
1996 (50th)
1996 (50th)	Donna Murphy	The King and I	Anna Leonowens	
1996 (50th)	Julie Andrews (nomination declined)	Victor/Victoria	Victoria Grant / Count Victor Grazinski	
1996 (50th)	Crista Moore	Big: The Musical	Susan Lawrence	
1996 (50th)	Daphne Rubin-Vega	Rent	Mimi Marquez	
1997 (51st)
1997 (51st)	Bebe Neuwirth	Chicago	Velma Kelly	
1997 (51st)	Pamela Isaacs	The Life	Queen	
1997 (51st)	Tonya Pinkins	Play On	Lady Liv	
1997 (51st)	Karen Ziemba	Steel Pier	Rita Racine	
1998 (52nd)
1998 (52nd)	Natasha Richardson	Cabaret	Sally Bowles	
1998 (52nd)	Betty Buckley	Triumph of Love	Hesione	
1998 (52nd)	Marin Mazzie	Ragtime	Mother	
1998 (52nd)	Alice Ripley & Emily Skinner	Side Show	Violet and Daisy Hilton	
1999 (53rd)
1999 (53rd)	Bernadette Peters	Annie Get Your Gun	Annie Oakley	
1999 (53rd)	Carolee Carmello	Parade	Lucille Frank	
1999 (53rd)	Dee Hoty	Footloose	Vi Moore	
1999 (53rd)	Siân Phillips	Marlene	Marlene Dietrich	

=== 2000s ===
Year	Actress	Musical	Role(s)	Ref.
2000 (54th)
2000 (54th)	Heather Headley	Aida	Aida	
2000 (54th)	Toni Collette	The Wild Party	Queenie	
2000 (54th)	Rebecca Luker	The Music Man	Marian Paroo	
2000 (54th)	Marin Mazzie	Kiss Me, Kate	Lilli Vanessi / Katharine	
2000 (54th)	Audra McDonald	Marie Christine	Marie Christine L'Adrese	
2001 (55th)
2001 (55th)	Christine Ebersole	42nd Street	Dorothy Brock	
2001 (55th)	Blythe Danner	Follies	Phyllis Rogers Stone	
2001 (55th)	Randy Graff	A Class Act	Sophie	
2001 (55th)	Faith Prince	Bells Are Ringing	Ella Peterson	
2001 (55th)	Marla Schaffel	Jane Eyre	Jane Eyre	
2002 (56th)
2002 (56th)	Sutton Foster	Thoroughly Modern Millie	Millie Dillmount	
2002 (56th)	Louise Pitre	Mamma Mia!	Donna Sheridan	
2002 (56th)	Nancy Opel	Urinetown	Penelope Pennywise	
2002 (56th)	Jennifer Laura Thompson	Urinetown	Hope Cladwell	
2002 (56th)	Vanessa Williams	Into the Woods	The Witch	
2003 (57th)
2003 (57th)	Marissa Jaret Winokur	Hairspray	Tracy Turnblad	
2003 (57th)	Melissa Errico	Amour	Isabella	
2003 (57th)	Mary Elizabeth Mastrantonio	Man of La Mancha	Aldonza / Dulcinea	
2003 (57th)	Elizabeth Parkinson	Movin' Out	Brenda	
2003 (57th)	Bernadette Peters	Gypsy	Rose	
2004 (58th)
2004 (58th)	Idina Menzel	Wicked	Elphaba	
2004 (58th)	Kristin Chenoweth	Wicked	Glinda	
2004 (58th)	Stephanie D'Abruzzo	Avenue Q	Kate Monster / Lucy the Slut / Company	
2004 (58th)	Donna Murphy	Wonderful Town	Ruth Sherwood	
2004 (58th)	Tonya Pinkins	Caroline, or Change	Caroline Thibodeaux	
2005 (59th)
2005 (59th)	Victoria Clark	The Light in the Piazza	Margaret Johnson	
2005 (59th)	Christina Applegate	Sweet Charity	Charity Hope Valentine	
2005 (59th)	Erin Dilly	Chitty Chitty Bang Bang	Truly Scrumptious	
2005 (59th)	Sutton Foster	Little Women	Josephine 'Jo' March	
2005 (59th)	Sherie Rene Scott	Dirty Rotten Scoundrels	Christine Colgate	
2006 (60th)
2006 (60th)	LaChanze	The Color Purple	Celie Harris Johnson	
2006 (60th)	Sutton Foster	The Drowsy Chaperone	Janet Van De Graaff	
2006 (60th)	Patti LuPone	Sweeney Todd: The Demon Barber of Fleet Street	Mrs. Lovett	
2006 (60th)	Kelli O'Hara	The Pajama Game	Catherine 'Babe' Williams	
2006 (60th)	Chita Rivera	Chita Rivera: The Dancer's Life	Chita Rivera	
2007 (61st)
2007 (61st)	Christine Ebersole	Grey Gardens	'Little Edie' Beale	
2007 (61st)	Laura Bell Bundy	Legally Blonde	Elle Woods	
2007 (61st)	Audra McDonald	110 in the Shade	Lizzie Curry	
2007 (61st)	Debra Monk	Curtains	Carmen Bernstein	
2007 (61st)	Donna Murphy	LoveMusik	Lotte Lenya	
2008 (62nd)
2008 (62nd)	Patti LuPone	Gypsy	Rose	
2008 (62nd)	Kerry Butler	Xanadu	Kira / Clio	
2008 (62nd)	Kelli O'Hara	Rodgers & Hammerstein's South Pacific	Ensign Nellie Forbush	
2008 (62nd)	Faith Prince	A Catered Affair	Agnes 'Aggie' Hurley	
2008 (62nd)	Jenna Russell	Sunday in the Park with George	Dot / Marie	
2009 (63rd)
2009 (63rd)	Alice Ripley	Next to Normal	Diana Goodman	
2009 (63rd)	Stockard Channing	Pal Joey	Vera Simpson	
2009 (63rd)	Sutton Foster	Shrek the Musical	Princess Fiona	
2009 (63rd)	Allison Janney	9 to 5	Violet Newstead	
2009 (63rd)	Josefina Scaglione	West Side Story	Maria	

=== 2010s ===
Year	Actress	Musical	Role(s)	Ref.
2010 (64th)
2010 (64th)	Catherine Zeta-Jones	A Little Night Music	Desiree Armfeldt	
2010 (64th)	Kate Baldwin	Finian's Rainbow	Sharon McLonergan	
2010 (64th)	Montego Glover	Memphis	Felicia Farrell	
2010 (64th)	Christiane Noll	Ragtime	Mother	
2010 (64th)	Sherie Rene Scott	Everyday Rapture	Sherie Rene Scott	
2011 (65th)
2011 (65th)	Sutton Foster	Anything Goes	Reno Sweeney	
2011 (65th)	Beth Leavel	Baby It's You!	Florence Greenberg	
2011 (65th)	Patina Miller	Sister Act	Deloris Van Cartier	
2011 (65th)	Donna Murphy	The People in the Picture	Bubbie / Raisel	
2012 (66th)
2012 (66th)	Audra McDonald	Porgy and Bess	Bess	
2012 (66th)	Jan Maxwell	Follies	Phyllis Rogers Stone	
2012 (66th)	Cristin Milioti	Once	Girl	
2012 (66th)	Kelli O'Hara	Nice Work If You Can Get It	Billie Bendix	
2012 (66th)	Laura Osnes	Bonnie and Clyde	Bonnie Parker	
2013 (67th)
2013 (67th)	Patina Miller	Pippin	The Leading Player	
2013 (67th)	Stephanie J. Block	The Mystery of Edwin Drood	Edwin Drood / Miss Alice Nutting	
2013 (67th)	Carolee Carmello	Scandalous	Aimee Semple McPherson	
2013 (67th)	Valisia LeKae	Motown: The Musical	Diana Ross	
2013 (67th)	Laura Osnes	Rodgers + Hammerstein's Cinderella	Ella	
2014 (68th)
2014 (68th)	Jessie Mueller	Beautiful: The Carole King Musical	Carole King	
2014 (68th)	Mary Bridget Davies	A Night with Janis Joplin	Janis Joplin	
2014 (68th)	Sutton Foster	Violet	Violet Karl	
2014 (68th)	Idina Menzel	If/Then	Elizabeth Vaughan	
2014 (68th)	Kelli O'Hara	The Bridges of Madison County	Francesca Johnson	
2015 (69th)
2015 (69th)	Kelli O'Hara	The King and I	Anna Leonowens	
2015 (69th)	Kristin Chenoweth	On the Twentieth Century	Lily Garland / Mildred Plotka	
2015 (69th)	Leanne Cope	An American in Paris	Lise Dassin	
2015 (69th)	Beth Malone	Fun Home	Alison Bechdel	
2015 (69th)	Chita Rivera	The Visit	Claire Zachanassian	
2016 (70th)
2016 (70th)	Cynthia Erivo	The Color Purple	Celie Harris Johnson	
2016 (70th)	Laura Benanti	She Loves Me	Amalia Balash	
2016 (70th)	Carmen Cusack	Bright Star	Alice Murphy	
2016 (70th)	Jessie Mueller	Waitress	Jenna Hunterson	
2016 (70th)	Phillipa Soo	Hamilton	Eliza Hamilton	
2017 (71st)
2017 (71st)	Bette Midler	Hello, Dolly!	Dolly Gallagher Levi	
2017 (71st)	Denée Benton	Natasha, Pierre & The Great Comet of 1812	Natasha Rostova	
2017 (71st)	Christine Ebersole	War Paint	Elizabeth Arden	
2017 (71st)	Patti LuPone	War Paint	Helena Rubinstein	
2017 (71st)	Eva Noblezada	Miss Saigon	Kim	
2018 (72nd)
2018 (72nd)	Katrina Lenk	The Band's Visit	Dina	
2018 (72nd)	Lauren Ambrose	My Fair Lady	Eliza Doolittle	
2018 (72nd)	Hailey Kilgore	Once on This Island	Ti Moune	
2018 (72nd)	LaChanze	Summer: The Donna Summer Musical	Diva Donna / Mary Gaines	
2018 (72nd)	Taylor Louderman	Mean Girls	Regina George	
2018 (72nd)	Jessie Mueller	Carousel	Julie Jordan	
2019 (73rd)
2019 (73rd)	Stephanie J. Block	The Cher Show	Star	
2019 (73rd)	Caitlin Kinnunen	The Prom	Emma Nolan	
2019 (73rd)	Beth Leavel	The Prom	Dee Dee Allen	
2019 (73rd)	Eva Noblezada	Hadestown	Eurydice	
2019 (73rd)	Kelli O'Hara	Kiss Me, Kate	Lilli Vanessi / Katharine	

=== 2020s ===
Year	Actress	Musical	Role(s)
2020 (74th)
2020 (74th)	Adrienne Warren	Tina: The Tina Turner Musical	Tina Turner
2020 (74th)	Karen Olivo	Moulin Rouge! The Musical	Satine
2020 (74th)	Elizabeth Stanley	Jagged Little Pill	Mary Jane Healy
2022 (75th)
2022 (75th)	Joaquina Kalukango	Paradise Square	Annabelle "Nelly" Freeman
2022 (75th)	Sharon D. Clarke	Caroline, or Change	Caroline Thibodeaux
2022 (75th)	Carmen Cusack	Flying Over Sunset	Clare Boothe Luce
2022 (75th)	Sutton Foster	The Music Man	Marian Paroo
2022 (75th)	Mare Winningham	Girl from the North Country	Elizabeth Laine
2023 (76th)
2023 (76th)	Victoria Clark	Kimberly Akimbo	Kimberly Levaco
2023 (76th)	Annaleigh Ashford	Sweeney Todd: The Demon Barber of Fleet Street	Mrs. Lovett
2023 (76th)	Sara Bareilles	Into the Woods	The Baker's Wife
2023 (76th)	Lorna Courtney	& Juliet	Juliet
2023 (76th)	Micaela Diamond	Parade	Lucille Frank
2024 (77th)
2024 (77th)	Maleah Joi Moon	Hell's Kitchen	Ali
2024 (77th)	Eden Espinosa	Lempicka	Tamara de Lempicka
2024 (77th)	Kelli O'Hara	Days of Wine and Roses	Kirsten Arnesen-Clay
2024 (77th)	Maryann Plunkett	The Notebook	Allison "Allie" Calhoun (older)
2024 (77th)	Gayle Rankin	Cabaret at the Kit Kat Club	Sally Bowles
2025 (78th)
2025 (78th)	Nicole Scherzinger	Sunset Blvd.	Norma Desmond
2025 (78th)	Megan Hilty	Death Becomes Her	Madeline Ashton
2025 (78th)	Audra McDonald	Gypsy	Rose
2025 (78th)	Jasmine Amy Rogers	BOOP! The Musical	Betty Boop
2025 (78th)	Jennifer Simard	Death Becomes Her	Helen Sharp
2026 (79th)
2026 (79th)	Caissie Levy	Ragtime	Mother
2026 (79th)	Sara Chase	Schmigadoon!	Melissa Gimble
2026 (79th)	Stephanie Hsu	The Rocky Horror Show	Janet Weiss
2026 (79th)	Marla Mindelle	Titanique	Celine Dion
2026 (79th)	Christiani Pitts	Two Strangers (Carry a Cake Across New York)	Robin Rainey

== Most wins ==
4 wins

- Angela Lansbury

3 wins

- Mary Martin
- Gwen Verdon

2 wins

- Lauren Bacall
- Victoria Clark
- Christine Ebersole
- Sutton Foster
- Patti LuPone
- Liza Minnelli
- Donna Murphy
- Bernadette Peters
- Chita Rivera

== Most nominations ==
8 nominations

- Chita Rivera

7 nominations

- Sutton Foster
- Kelli O'Hara

6 nominations

- Bernadette Peters

5 nominations

- Patti LuPone
- Donna Murphy
- Gwen Verdon

4 nominations

- Carol Channing
- Angela Lansbury
- Mary Martin
- Audra McDonald

3 nominations

- Julie Andrews
- Jessie Mueller
- Christine Ebersole
- Dee Hoty
- Dorothy Loudon
- Ethel Merman
- Liza Minnelli
- Faith Prince

2 nominations

- Lauren Bacall
- Stephanie J. Block
- Georgia Brown
- Carolee Carmello
- Kristin Chenoweth
- Victoria Clark
- Carmen Cusack
- Sandy Duncan
- Nanette Fabray
- Dolores Gray
- Barbara Harris
- Judy Kuhn
- LaChanze
- Beth Leavel
- Beatrice Lillie
- Rebecca Luker
- Marin Mazzie
- Patina Miller
- Idina Menzel
- Eva Noblezada
- Laura Osnes
- Tonya Pinkins
- Maryann Plunkett
- Alice Ripley
- Sherie Rene Scott
- Alexis Smith
- Elaine Stritch
- Inga Swenson
- Nancy Walker

== Character win total ==
3 wins

- Anna Leonowens from The King and I
- Rose from Gypsy

2 wins

- Desiree Armfeldt from A Little Night Music
- Norma Desmond from Sunset Boulevard
- Celie Harris Johnson from The Color Purple
- Dolly Gallagher Levi from Hello, Dolly!

== Character nomination total ==
6 nominations

- Rose from Gypsy

4 nominations

- Mrs. Lovett from Sweeney Todd
- Peter Pan from Peter Pan and Jerome Robbins' Broadway

3 nominations

- Anna Leonowens from The King and I
- Charity Hope Valentine from Sweet Charity
- Mother from Ragtime
- Phyllis Rogers Stone from Follies

2 nominations

- Amalia Balash from She Loves Me
- The Baker's Wife from Into the Woods
- Bess from Porgy and Bess
- Caroline Thibodeaux from Caroline, or Change
- Celie Harris Johnson from The Color Purple
- Desiree Armfeldt from A Little Night Music
- Dolly Gallagher Levi from Hello, Dolly!
- Dot / Marie from Sunday in the Park with George
- Eliza Doolittle from My Fair Lady
- Ella Peterson from Bells Are Ringing
- Ensign Nellie Forbush from South Pacific
- Fiona MacLaren from Brigadoon
- Kim from Miss Saigon
- Lilli Vanessi / Katharine from Kiss Me, Kate
- Lily Garland / Mildred Plotka from On the Twentieth Century
- Lizzie Curry from 110 in the Shade
- Lucille Frank from Parade
- Marian Paroo from The Music Man
- Norma Desmond from Sunset Boulevard
- Reno Sweeney from Anything Goes
- Ruth Sherwood from Wonderful Town
- Sally Bowles from Cabaret
- Sarah Brown from Guys and Dolls
- Velma Kelly from Chicago

=== Characters nominated for both the Tony Award for Best Actress in a Play and the Tony Award for Best Actress in a Musical ===
- Joan of Arc from Goodtime Charley, Saint Joan, Joan of Lorraine and The Lark
- Countess Aurelia from The Madwoman of Chaillot and Dear World
- Sally Bowles from I Am a Camera and Cabaret
- Leona Samish from The Time of the Cuckoo and Do I Hear a Waltz?
- Dolly Gallagher Levi from The Matchmaker and Hello Dolly!
- Lena Younger from A Raisin in the Sun and Raisin
- Mame Dennis from Auntie Mame and Mame
- Eliza Gant from Look Homeward, Angel and Angel
- Claire Zachanassian The Visit (play) and The Visit (musical)
- Sister Margaret Alexander from The Amen Corner and Amen Corner (musical)
- Eliza Doolittle from Pygmalion and My Fair Lady
- Lizzie Curry from The Rainmaker and 110 in the Shade.
- Lily Garland / Mildred Plotka from Twentieth Century and On the Twentieth Century
- Madame Arcati from Blithe Spirit and High Spirits
- Anna Christopherson from Anna Christie and New Girl in Town

== Productions with multiple nominations ==
boldface=winner

- New Girl in Town – **Thelma Ritter** and **Gwen Verdon** (tie)
- Company – Susan Browning and Elaine Stritch
- Follies – Dorothy Collins and **Alexis Smith**
- Chicago – Chita Rivera and Gwen Verdon
- Annie – **Dorothy Loudon** and Andrea McArdle
- Dreamgirls – **Jennifer Holliday** and Sheryl Lee Ralph
- The Rink – Liza Minnelli and **Chita Rivera**
- Black and Blue – **Ruth Brown** and Linda Hopkins
- Guys and Dolls – Josie de Guzman and **Faith Prince**
- Urinetown – Nancy Opel and Jennifer Laura Thompson
- Wicked – Kristin Chenoweth and **Idina Menzel**
- War Paint – Christine Ebersole and Patti LuPone
- The Prom – Caitlin Kinnunen and Beth Leavel
- Death Becomes Her – Megan Hilty and Jennifer Simard

== Multiple awards and nominations ==
Actresses who have been nominated multiple times in any acting categories

Awards	Nominations	Recipient
6	11	Audra McDonald
5	10	Julie Harris
5	7	Angela Lansbury
4	6	Gwen Verdon
4	4	Zoe Caldwell
3	8	Patti LuPone
3	7	Laurie Metcalf
3	5	Irene Worth
3	5	Jessica Tandy
3	4	Glenn Close
3	4	Mary Martin
3	3	Shirley Booth
2	10	Chita Rivera
2	8	Colleen Dewhurst
2	7	Bernadette Peters
2	7	Frances Sternhagen
2	7	Sutton Foster
2	6	Andrea Martin
2	6	Maureen Stapleton
2	5	Victoria Clark
2	5	Cherry Jones
2	5	Donna Murphy
2	5	Mary-Louise Parker
2	5	Swoosie Kurtz
2	4	Christine Ebersole
2	4	Cynthia Nixon
2	4	Judith Ivey
2	4	Judy Kaye
2	4	Kara Young
2	4	Margaret Leighton
2	3	Anne Bancroft
2	3	Bebe Neuwirth
2	3	Helen Gallagher
2	3	Helen Hayes
2	3	Jennifer Ehle
2	3	Judith Light
2	3	Liza Minnelli
2	3	Phylicia Rashad
2	3	Viola Davis
2	2	Christine Baranski
2	2	Katie Finneran
2	2	Lauren Bacall
2	2	Sandy Dennis
2	2	Tammy Grimes
2	2	Uta Hagen
1
1	9	Kelli O'Hara
1	9	Rosemary Harris
1	8	Jane Alexander
1	7	Stockard Channing
1	6	Linda Lavin
1	5	Celia Keenan-Bolger
1	5	Glenda Jackson
1	5	Jayne Houdyshell
1	5	Laura Benanti
1	5	Marian Seldes
1	4	Blythe Danner
1	4	Carol Channing
1	4	Carole Shelley
1	4	Debra Monk
1	4	Diana Rigg
1	4	Faith Prince
1	4	Jessie Mueller
1	4	Julie White
1	4	Karen Ziemba
1	4	LaChanze
1	4	Madeline Kahn
1	3	Amanda Plummer
1	3	Annaleigh Ashford
1	3	Barbara Harris
1	3	Beth Leavel
1	3	Dorothy Loudon
1	3	Elizabeth Ashley
1	3	Elizabeth Franz
1	3	Ethel Merman
1	3	Helen Mirren
1	3	Idina Menzel
1	3	Jane Krakowski
1	3	Janet McTeer
1	3	Joanna Gleason
1	3	Kristin Chenoweth
1	3	Lois Smith
1	3	Maggie Smith
1	3	Mercedes Ruehl
1	3	Rae Allen
1	3	Shoshana Bean
1	3	Stephanie J. Block
1	3	Tonya Pinkins
1	3	Tyne Daly
1	3	Vanessa Redgrave
1	2	Adriane Lenox
1	2	Adrienne Warren
1	2	Alexis Smith
1	2	Alice Ghostly
1	2	Alice Ripley
1	2	Anika Noni Rose
1	2	Anna Manahan
1	2	Barbara Cook
1	2	Betty Buckley
1	2	Cady Huffman
1	2	Dolores Gray
1	2	Frances McDormand
1	2	Gretha Boston
1	2	Jessica Lange
1	2	Jo Van Fleet
1	2	Joan Allen
1	2	Joaquina Kalukango
1	2	Judith Anderson
1	2	Karen Olivo
1	2	Leora Dana
1	2	Leslie Uggams
1	2	Liliane Montevecchi
1	2	Lillias White
1	2	Linda Hopkins
1	2	Lindsay Duncan
1	2	Lindsay Mendez
1	2	Lotte Lenya
1	2	Lynne Thigpen
1	2	Marcia Gay Harden
1	2	Margaret Tyzack
1	2	Maria Karnilova
1	2	Mary Alice
1	2	Maryann Plunkett
1	2	Mary Louise Wilson
1	2	Nanette Fabray
1	2	Natasha Richardson
1	2	Nikki M. James
1	2	Nina Arianda
1	2	Patina Miller
1	2	Patricia Elliott
1	2	Patsy Kelly
1	2	Phyllis Newman
1	2	Priscilla Lopez
1	2	Randy Graff
1	2	Rosalind Russell
1	2	Ruthie Ann Miles
1	2	Shirley Knight
1	2	Sophie Okonedo

Nominations	Recipient
5	Dana Ivey
5	Laura Linney
5	Estelle Parsons
5	Jan Maxwell
4	Condola Rashad
4	Eileen Atkins
4	Elaine Stritch
4	Geraldine Page
4	Judy Kuhn
4	Kate Nelligan
4	Tovah Feldshuh
4	Zoë Wanamaker
3	Amy Ryan
3	Brenda Vaccaro
3	Carolee Carmello
3	Dee Hoty
3	Eileen Heckart
3	Jennifer Simard
3	Jessica Hecht
3	Julie Andrews
3	Kate Burton
3	Linda Emond
3	Louise Troy
3	Lynn Redgrave
3	Marin Mazzie
3	Martha Plimpton
3	Mary Beth Hurt
3	Mary Testa
3	Rebecca Luker
3	Rosemary Murphy
3	Sandy Duncan
2	Alison Fraser
2	Allison Janney
2	Amy Morton
2	Ann Reinking
2	Anne Pitoniak
2	Annette Bening
2	Barbara Bel Geddes
2	Barbra Streisand
2	Beatrice Lillie
2	Beth Fowler
2	Betsy Aidem
2	Carmen Cusack
2	Carol Burnett
2	Carrie Coon
2	Charlotte d'Amboise
2	Charlotte Rae
2	Christine Andreas
2	Claudia McNeil
2	Crista Moore
2	Daphne Rubin-Vega
2	Debbie Allen
2	Diana Sands
2	Eartha Kitt
2	Elizabeth Allen
2	Ernestine Jackson
2	Eva Noblezada
2	Eve Best
2	Fionnula Flanagan
2	Georgia Brown
2	Gladys Cooper
2	Inga Swenson
2	Jane Fonda
2	Jayne Atkinson
2	Johanna Day
2	Josephine Premice
2	Josie de Guzman
2	Julienne Marie
2	Kate Baldwin
2	Kate Reid
2	Katharine Hepburn
2	Kathleen Turner
2	Kim Stanley
2	Kristine Nielsen
2	LaTanya Richardson Jackson
2	Laura Donnelly
2	Laura Osnes
2	Leland Palmer
2	Liv Ullmann
2	Marcia Lewis
2	Mare Winningham
2	Mary Beth Peil
2	Megan Hilty
2	Michele Lee
2	Mildred Natwick
2	Millicent Martin
2	Nancy Dussault
2	Nancy Walker
2	Penny Fuller
2	Pert Kelton
2	Rachel Dratch
2	Ruth Wilson
2	S. Epatha Merkerson
2	Sarah Stiles
2	Sherie Rene Scott
2	Sinéad Cusack
2	Siobhán McKenna
2	Spencer Kayden
2	Susan Browning
2	Tammy Blanchard
2	Vivian Reed
2	Zohra Lampert

== See also ==
- Best Actress
- Dorian Award for Outstanding Lead Performance in a Broadway Musical
- Drama Desk Award for Outstanding Actress in a Musical
- Drama Desk Award for Outstanding Lead Performance in a Musical
- Drama League Award for Distinguished Performance
- Laurence Olivier Award for Best Actress in a Musical
- Lists of acting awards
- Outer Critics Circle Award for Outstanding Lead Performer in a Broadway Musical
