= Long-running plays =

Non-musical theatre productions

This is a selected list of the longest-running plays, that is non-musical theatre productions, in history.

Title	Creator	Performances	Year Opened	Year Closed	Country	Location	Comments
The Bald Soprano / The Lesson	Eugène Ionesco	20,000+	1957	currently running	France	Paris,Théâtre de la Huchette	Theatre of the Absurd
Horn in the West	Kermit Hunter		1952	currently running	United States of America	Boone, North Carolina	outdoor drama; performed each summer
Life with Father	Howard Lindsay and Russel Crouse	3,224	1939	1947	United States of America	New York City, Broadway, Empire Theatre	longest running straight play in Broadway history; premiered at Empire Theater and also played at Bijou Theatre (1945–1947) and Alvin Theatre (1947)
Line	Israel Horovitz	3,300+	1974	2018	United States of America	New York City, Off-off-Broadway, 13th Street Repertory Theatre	absurdist drama; only played once or twice a week with an irregular schedule
The Lost Colony	Paul Green	5,000+	1937	currently running	United States of America	Manteo, North Carolina	outdoor drama; performed each summer
The Mousetrap	Agatha Christie	30,000+	1952	currently running	United Kingdom	West End, London, St Martin's Theatre	murder mystery; longest running play in world history; Previously played at the Ambassadors Theatre (1952–1974)
Oberammergau Passion Play	Rochus Dedler, Eugen Papst, and others		1634	currently running	Germany	Oberammergau, Bavaria, Germany	passion play; performed in summer each decadal year since 1680 with a few exceptions.
Perfect Crime	Warren Manzi	15,000+	1987	currently running	United States of America	New York City, Off-Broadway, The Theater Center	murder mystery; lead Catherine Russell has performed in the play since 1987 and has only missed four performances.
The Ramona Pageant	Helen Hunt Jackson		1923	currently running	United States of America	Hemet, California	outdoor drama; runs each April and May on weekends
Shear Madness	Paul Pörtner	12,580	1980	2020	United States of America	Boston, Massachusetts, Charles Playhouse Stage II	interactive whodunit
Shear Madness	Paul Pörtner	14,737	1987	2026	United States of America	Washington, DC, John F. Kennedy Center for the Performing Arts, Theater Lab	interactive whodunit; longest running play in American history
Unto These Hills	Kermit Hunter; Hanay Geiogamah		1950	currently running	United States of America	Cherokee, North Carolina	outdoor drama; performed each summer
