= Ruth Arrington =

American Muscogee community leader (1924-2002)

- Born: October 15, 1924; Red Fork, Oklahoma, U.S.
- Died: October 26, 2002 (aged 78); Tulsa, Oklahoma, U.S.
- Occupations: Academic; media personality; community leader

Academic background
- Education: Oklahoma College for Women; University of Michigan; Louisiana State University
- Thesis: Speech activities in Tahlequah, Cherokee Nation, during the seventies (1971)

Academic work
- Institutions: Northeastern State University

Ruth Arrington (October 15, 1924 – October 26, 2002) was an American Muscogee Nation academic, media personality, and community leader. She was a speech professor at Northeastern State University, where she was also coordinator for their Indian Studies Program. She worked in outdoor drama, appearing in Horn in the West as Nancy Ward, as well as a filmmaker and media producer. She was also a community leader for Native Americans, including at the Muscogee Nation.

== Biography ==
Arrington, a member of the Muscogee Nation, was born on October 15, 1924, in Red Fork, Oklahoma. She obtained a BA from the Oklahoma College for Women (now the University of Science and Arts of Oklahoma), an MA from the University of Michigan, and in 1971 a PhD from Louisiana State University, all in speech. Her doctoral dissertation was titled Speech activities in Tahlequah, Cherokee Nation, during the seventies.

Arrington worked as a speech professor at Northeastern State University, as well as coordinator for the Indian Studies Program. Her work includes a 1975 article in The Speech Teacher journal and the 1977 volume Essays on Minority Folklore. as well as book and stage reviews. She also taught speech at Appalachian State University, Kansas State College of Pittsburg, and Northeastern Oklahoma A&M College (NEO), and taught communications at Headlands Health Careers for Gifted Indian Students. She was awarded the 1987 Oklahoma-Speech-Theatre-Communication Association award for Outstanding College Theatre Educator. In 1988, she retired from NSU.

Arrington worked as an actress and dancer in outdoor drama. She appeared in Horn in the West as Nancy Ward, as well as the Tahlequah outdoor drama The Trail of Tears. She narrated Creek Nation video tapes Muskogee/Creek Folklore and Turtle Shells, directed the film The American Indian and His Government, and produced videotapes and slides for Beavers Bend Resort Park's Forest Heritage Center. She was also a drama teacher at NEO.

Arrington was a member of the Headlands Indian Health Program Board, Oklahoma Humanities Committee, Oklahoma Indian Affairs Commission, and the University of Oklahoma American Indian Institute's advisory board. She was the master of ceremonies for the inauguration of Muscogee Nation Chief Bill Fife, as well as a judge for pageants such as Miss Cherokee, as well as the Five Civilized Tribes Museum competitive show. She worked as a model for Sandy Fife Wilson's Fife Collection

Arrington was a 1972 Oklahoma Federation of Indian Women Outstanding Indian Woman. She was inducted into USAO's Hall of Fame in 2001. She also won a Cultural Achievement Award from the American Association of University Women's Oklahoma Division.

Outside of education and acting, Arrington worked for the Douglas Aircraft Company and a Central State Bank branch in Oklahoma City. She moved to Sapulpa, Oklahoma in the 1970s, living there until her death.

Arrington died on October 26, 2002, in Ascension St. John Medical Center in Tulsa; she was 78.
