= Unto These Hills =

Outdoor historical drama in Cherokee, North Carolina, US

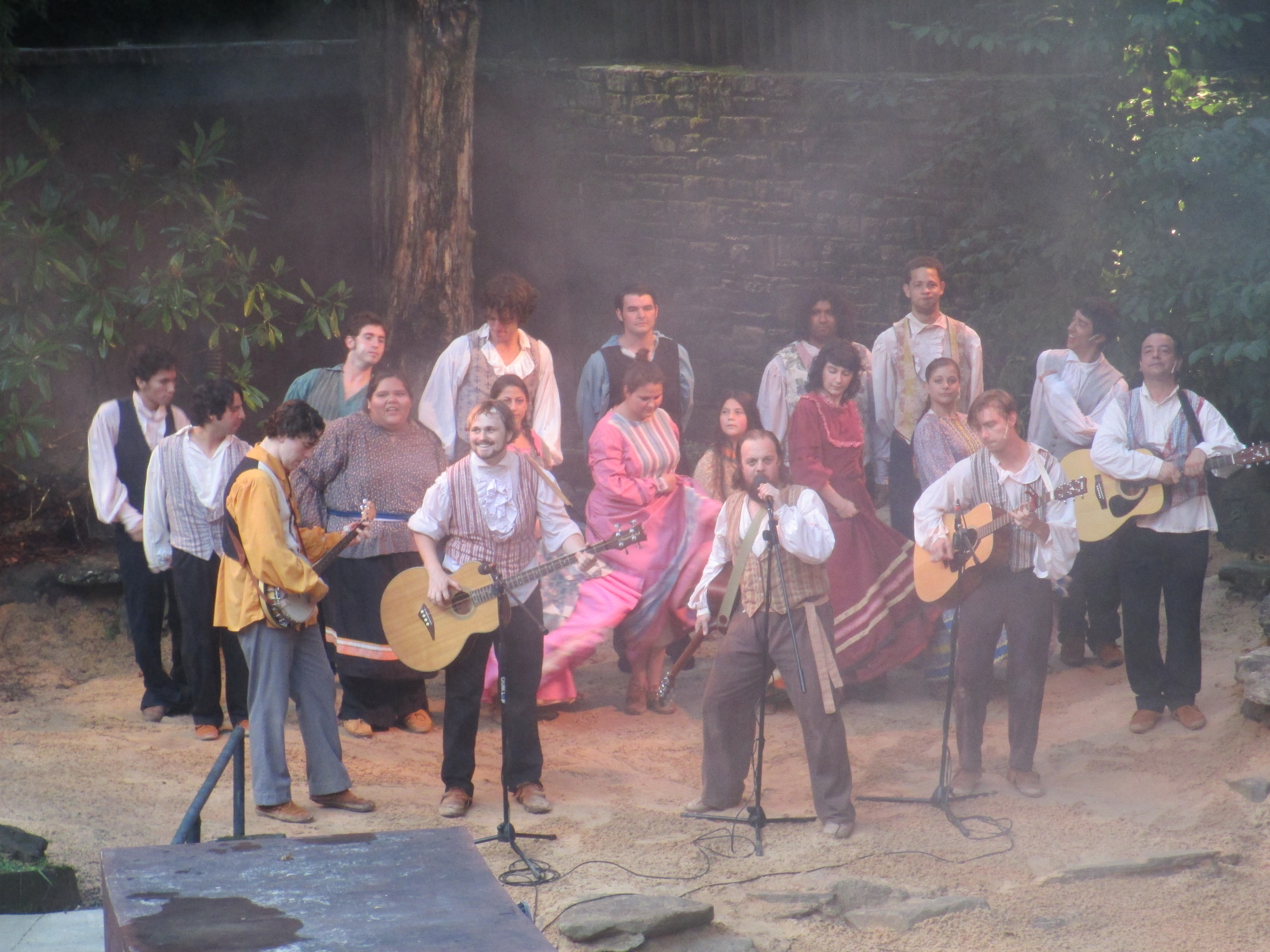
- The cast assembles for the drama, July 19, 2012.
- Written by: Kermit Hunter; Hanay Geiogamah; Pat Allee, Ben Hurst and Linda Hurst
- Genre: Outdoor historical drama

Premiere
- Date: July 1, 1950
- Place: Cherokee, North Carolina

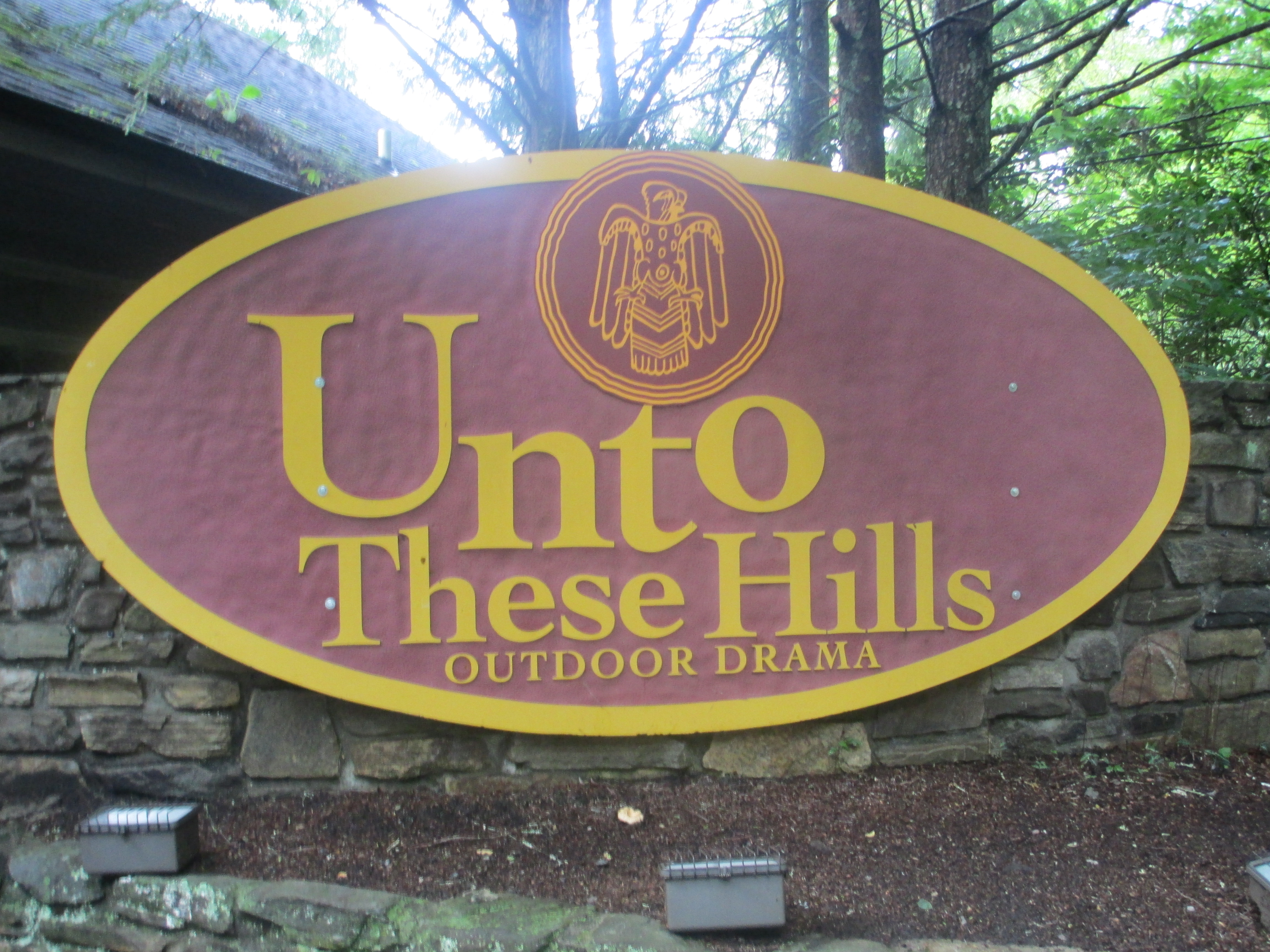

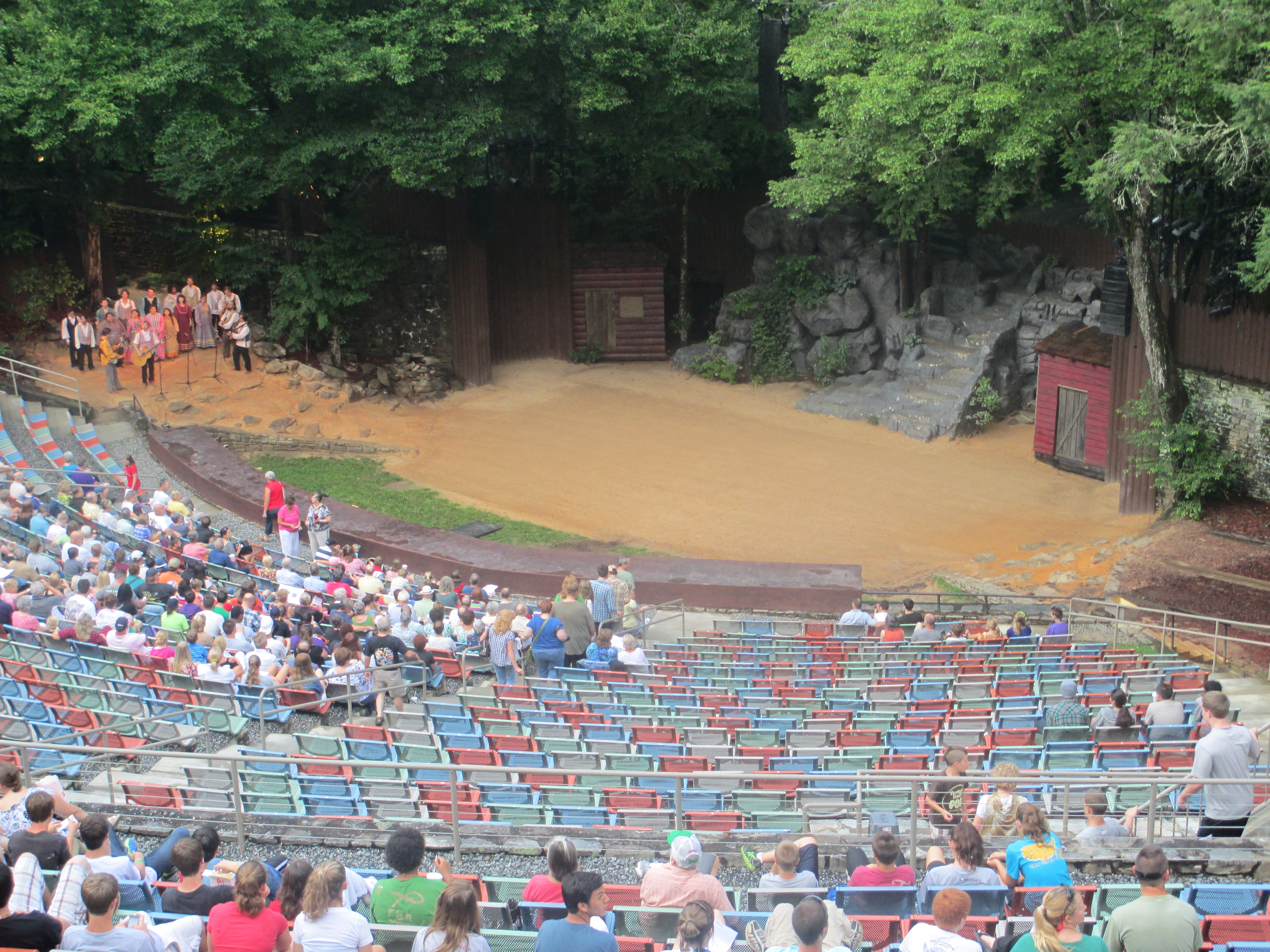
Singers perform on the left side of the amphitheater before the play begins and the audience gathers.

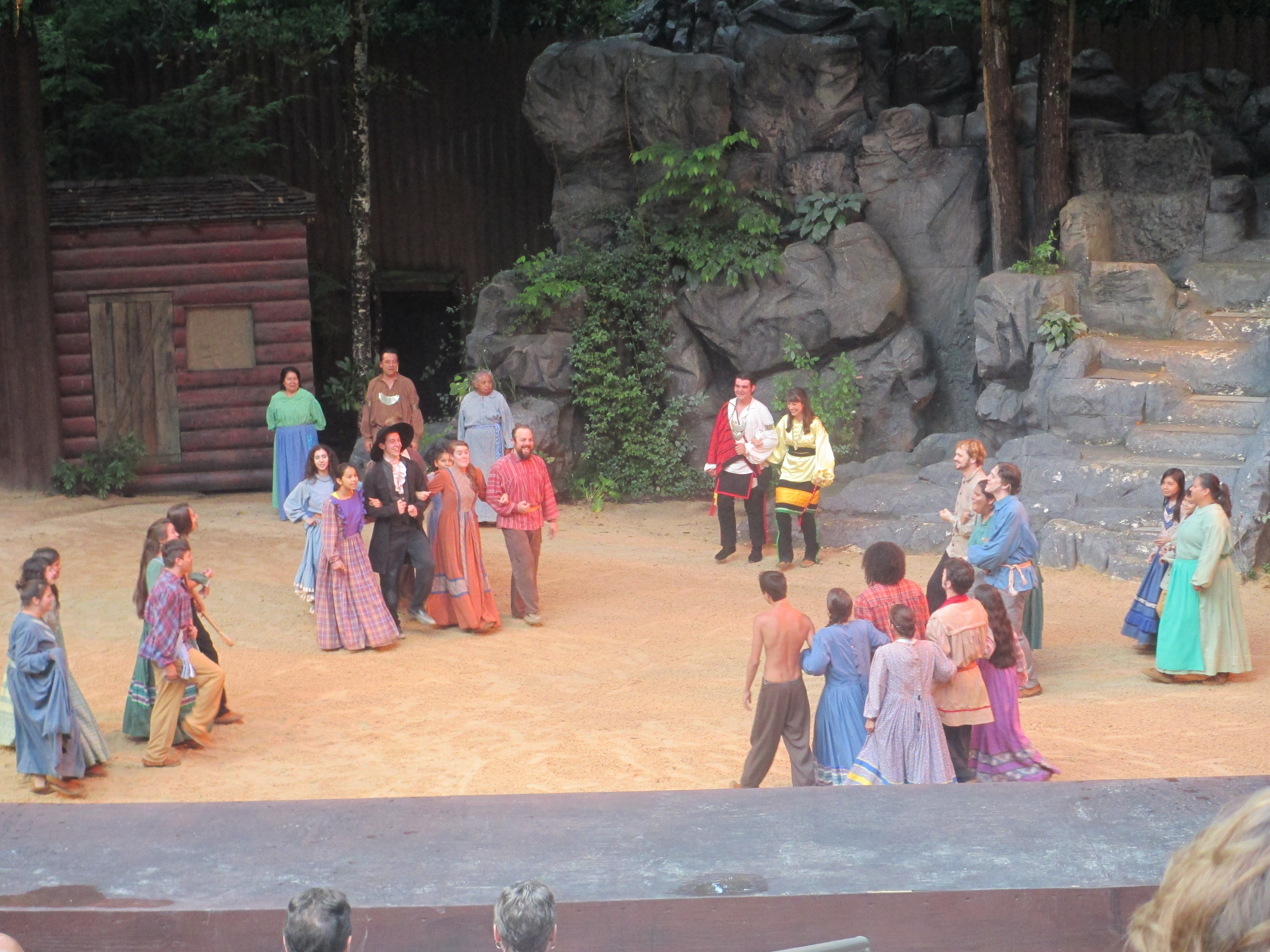
Another look at the play

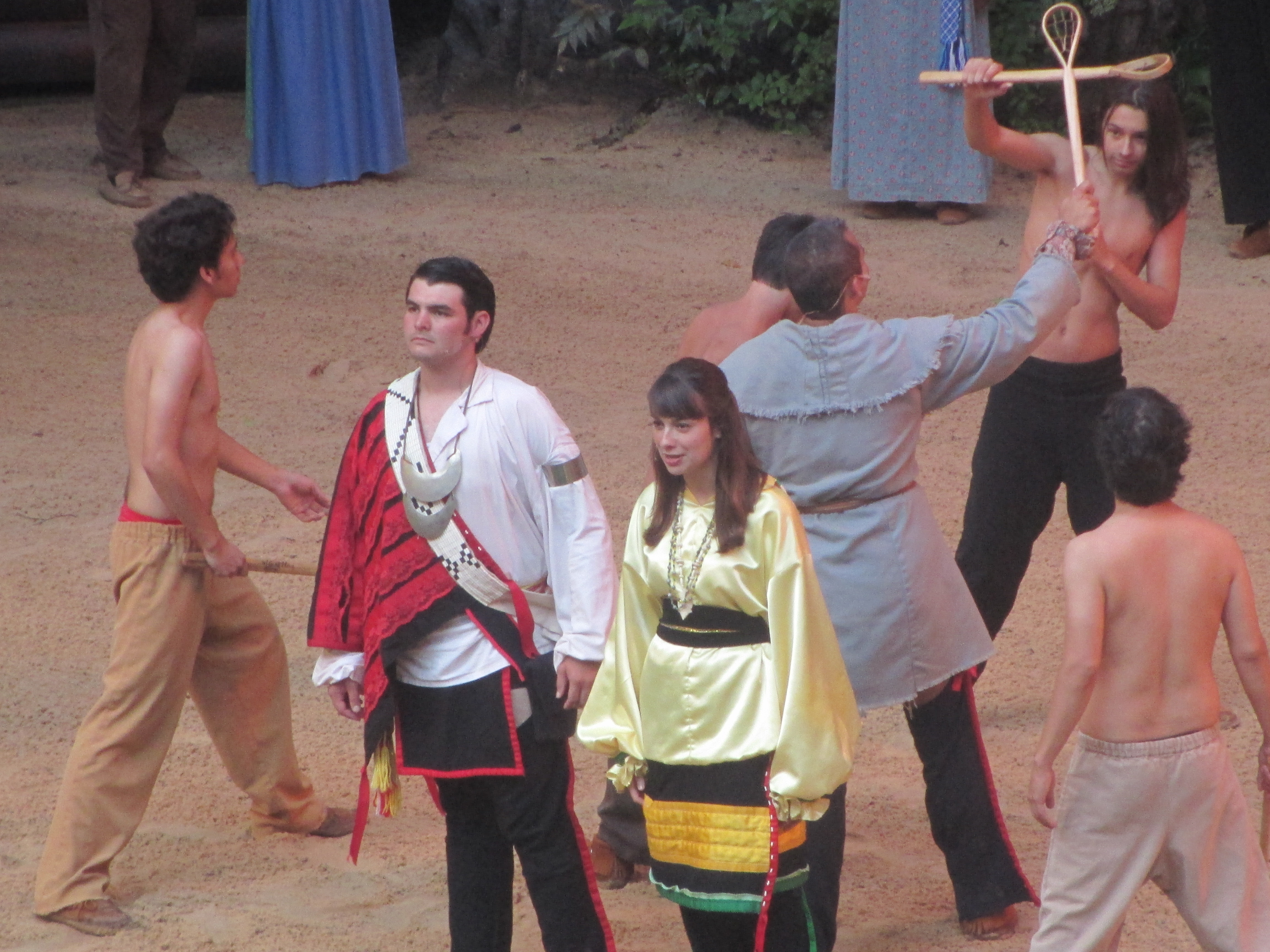
Closeup of Unto These Hills performers

Unto These Hills is an outdoor historical drama during summers at the 2,800-seat Mountainside Theatre in Cherokee, North Carolina. It is the third oldest outdoor historical drama in the United States, after The Lost Colony in Manteo in eastern North Carolina and The Ramona Pageant in Southern California. The first version of the play was written by Kermit Hunter and opened on July 1, 1950, to wide acclaim.

The play recounts the history of the Cherokee of the Eastern region up to their removal by United States forces in 1838 via the Trail of Tears to Indian Territory, now Oklahoma. The drama includes notable Cherokee historic figures, including Sequoyah, Junaluska, Chief Yonaguska a.k.a. Drowning Bear, and William Holland Thomas.

== History ==
The Western North Carolina Associated Communities (WNCAC) in western North Carolina wanted to develop tourism and promote economic growth in the western part of the state. Inspired by the success of Paul Green's historic outdoor drama, or political pageant, The Lost Colony, the WNCAC decided to make another political pageant about the Eastern Band of Cherokee Indians (EBCI) in Cherokee, North Carolina. When Paul Green was unavailable to write a second play, they commissioned UNC graduate student Kermit Hunter to write the new outdoor drama. With the help of Joe Jennings, director Samuel Selden chose the EBCI's homeland of Cherokee, North Carolina, as the backdrop for the drama. The Mountainside Theatre was built for this outdoor drama. The play was first produced on July 1, 1950. It was immediately successful with more than 100,000 audience members in its first year of production.

The play has run for more than 70 years at the Mountainside Theatre, which is owned and operated by the Cherokee Historical Association. It is staged Monday through Saturday evenings.

Famous alumni of Unto These Hills include Michael Rosenbaum, best known for his portrayal of Lex Luthor on Smallville; Adam Richman, host of Travel Channel's Man v. Food; Polly Holliday, of the 1970s sitcom Alice; and actor and former U.S. Representative Ben L. Jones of Georgia, a regular on CBS's The Dukes of Hazzard.

In 2006, the EBCI Tribal Government hired playwright Hanay Geiogamah (Kiowa) to revise the script, the first complete rewrite since the play was instituted. Geiogamah is a writer/director/producer of Native American dramas, as well as the founder of the American Indian Dance Theatre and Professor in the Department of Theater at the University of California, Los Angeles. Geiogamah was chosen to address a number of issues with the previous script, including historical inaccuracies. He was also encouraged to increase Cherokee tribal participation in the cast. Geiogamah accepted this challenge, wrote a new script, and produced a show. But many tribal members were reportedly not fond of the new play version, saying that it removed the Cherokee style of story telling and their history in this area. Geiogamah had added more interpretive dance to help convey the story. In addition, many tribal members missed having the story of Tsali included in the play. He is believed to have sacrificed his life in battle to gain approval for the remainder of his Cherokee people to stay in their homeland of North Carolina, at a time of conflict with European Americans.

In 2007, the tribe hired Pat Allee and Ben Hurst to write a new script. In 2008, additional changes were made by Linda West. Fewer than 50,000 people saw the performance in summer 2009, about half the number from years ago. John Tissue, director of the Cherokee Historical Association, suggests economic problems as the reason for the reduced crowds. The 2010 production is credited to Linda Squirrel. Eddie Swimmer, a Cherokee, serves as director of the drama. As of 2010, more than six million people have seen the production.

In 2015, it was announced that the original Kermit Hunter script from 1950 would be brought out of retirement. Several changes were made to make the original script more historically accurate. Many attendees have been well pleased to see the original version of the show.

In 2020, the production announced that the 2020 season was cancelled due to the COVID-19 pandemic. It was the first time the drama did not have a production season. The drama returned to their normal operating schedule in May 2021.

=== Sequel ===
The Cherokee Nation hired Hunter to write a sequel, The Trail of Tears, covering the period during and after the removal to Indian Territory in what became the state of Oklahoma. That drama was performed at a large outdoor amphitheater at the Cherokee Heritage Center (then known as Tsa-La-Gi), from 1969 through 2005.

== See also ==
- Long-running plays (non-musicals)
- Snow Camp Outdoor Theater
- The Lost Colony
- Horn in the West
