= Cross and Sword =

Play written by Paul Green

- Original language: English
- Written by: Paul Green
- Characters: Pedro Menéndez; Philip II; Jean Ribault
- Subject: Reenactment of the founding of St. Augustine
- Genre: Historical
- Setting: St. Augustine, Florida

Premiere
- Date: June 27, 1965
- Place: St. Augustine Amphitheatre, St. Augustine, Florida
- Original run: 1965-1996

Cross and Sword was a 1965 play by American playwright Paul Green created to honor the 400th anniversary of the settlement of St. Augustine. It was Florida's official state play, having received the designation by the Florida Senate in 1973. It was performed for ten weeks every summer in St. Augustine for more than 30 years, closing in 1996.

== Beginning ==
The Pulitzer Prize-winning playwright Paul Green created a play in 1937 about Walter Raleigh's Roanoke Colony entitled Lost Colony. It was written as a "symphonic drama" blending music, dance, pantomime, and poetic dialogue into a larger-than-life historical play. In 1965 Green was commissioned to write a play commemorating the 400th anniversary of the founding of St. Augustine. The play was to be performed at the newly constructed, 2,000 seat St. Augustine Amphitheatre. The result was Cross and Sword: A Symphonic Drama of the Spanish Settlement of Florida. The play is a musical reenactment depicting Florida's early history at St. Augustine, especially its colonization by Spaniard Pedro Menéndez de Avilés and his settlers' bloody conflicts with French Huguenots at Fort Caroline in present-day Jacksonville.

== End ==
Production for Cross and Sword, with its large cast and elaborate costumes and props, was expensive. For many years, costs were partially subsidized by the state. However, changes to state rules led to a decrease in funding. Faced with a decreased budget and an aging theater in need of renovation, Cross and Sword lobbied for $27,000 from the state Division of Cultural Affairs in 1997, but the proposal was rejected. After the 1996 season, the production closed. In 2002, St. Johns County acquired and renovated the amphitheater, turning it into a concert venue.
