= St. Augustine Amphitheatre =

Amphitheatre in St. Augustine, Florida, US

Coordinates: 29.8755°N 81.2829°W

- Interactive map of St. Augustine Amphitheatre
- Address: 1340C A1A South; St. Augustine, FL 32080-5422
- Location: Anastasia State Park
- Owner: St. Johns County Parks & Recreation
- Operator: SJC Cultural Events, Inc.
- Capacity: 4,700

Construction
- Opened: June 27, 1965
- Rebuilt: 2001-07
- Cost: $200,000 ($2.08 million in 2025 dollars)
- Architects: Fred Halback and Les Thomas

Website
- Venue Website

The St. Augustine Amphitheatre (shortened as The Amp) is an outdoor amphitheater located on A1A in St. Augustine, Florida, United States. The venue seats over 4,700 persons, and is managed by SJC Cultural Events, Inc since September 2023.

== History ==
The amphitheatre was built in 1965 to commemorate the 400th anniversary of the founding of St. Augustine, originally with 2,000 seats. land was originally part of Anastasia State Park. The amphitheatre itself was constructed in one of the old coquina quarries used to supply building materials for St. Augustine and the Castillo de San Marcos.

The Pulitzer Prize winning playwright Paul Green was commissioned to write a play to be performed at the amphitheatre. The result was Cross and Sword: A Symphonic Drama of the Spanish Settlement of Florida, a musical reenactment of the first years of St. Augustine's existence. Cross and Sword was designated the official state play in 1973 by the Florida Legislature. The play ran until 1996, when budget constraints ended its more than 30-year run.

The amphitheatre was used infrequently during the following years, though it did host a free summer Shakespeare Festival from 1997 to 2003. In 2002, St. Johns County acquired the property and the following year began an $8.7 million renovation. The upgraded facility reopened in August 2007, which includes a fiberglass tensile canopy over the main stage. In 2018, the amphitheatre's 300 level seating was expanded by adding 700 seats, bringing the venue's capacity to 4,700. In 2019, the theater branded itself as "The Amp". Also in 2019, the Amp is ranked #2 amphitheatre in the United States and #3 worldwide according to leading concert-industry publication Pollstar Magazine's 2019 Mid-Year report.

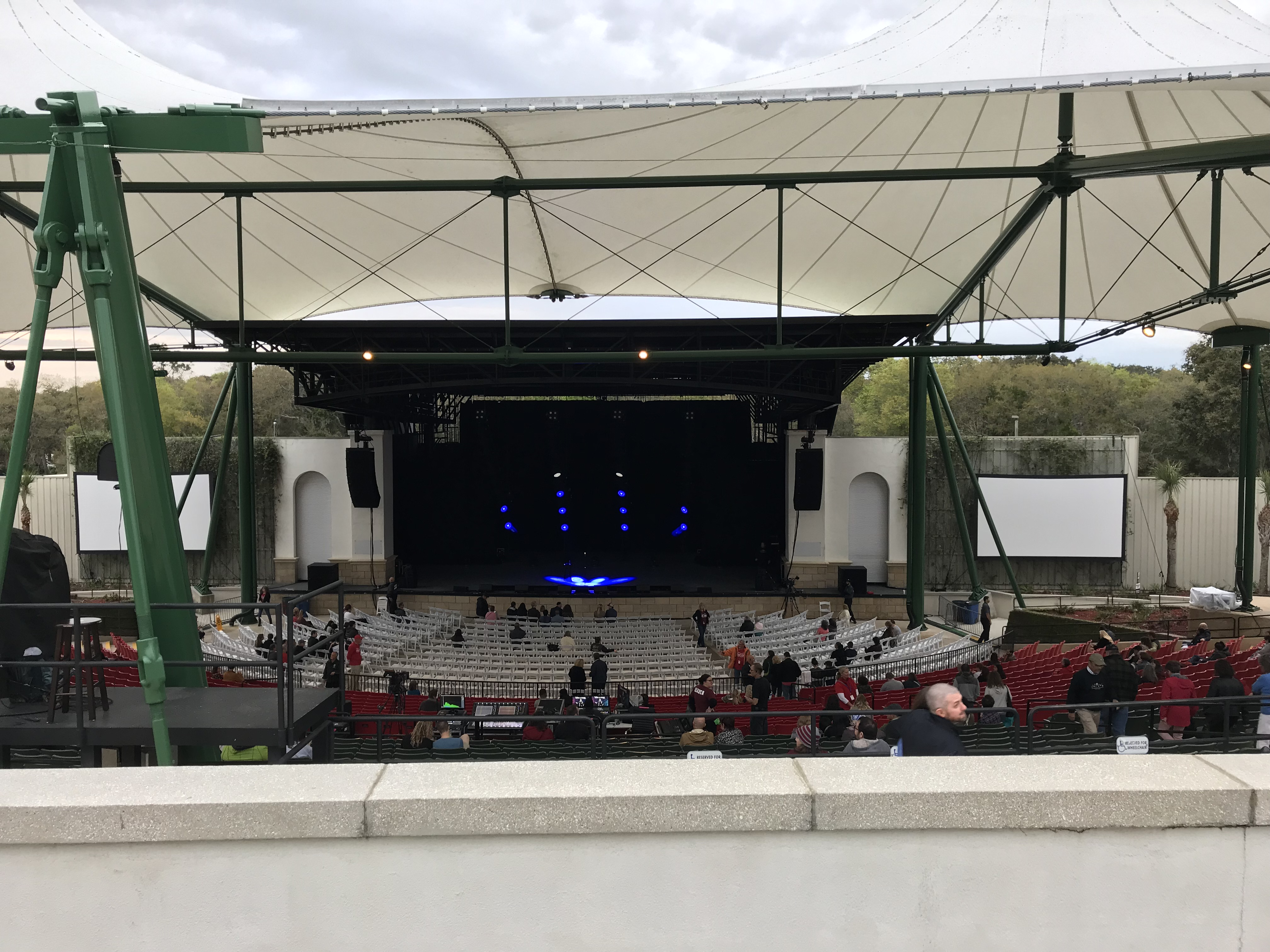
View of stage from section 302 (2019)

== Farmers market ==
The St. Augustine Amphitheatre Farmers' market is open Saturday mornings from 8:30am to 12:30pm throughout the year. In addition to produce and plants direct from the farm, there is fresh seafood, cheeses, baked goods, Food trucks and wares from local artists & craftspeople. Live entertainment is provided many Saturdays.
The Night Market is open quarterly on a Tuesday evening from 5pm to 9pm. Add a full bar and live music; take away the farmer's contributions.

== Noted performers ==
- Duran Duran
- 311
- Alan Jackson
- Aretha Franklin
- The Avett Brothers
- Awolnation
- Barenaked Ladies
- Billy Currington
- The Black Crowes
- Bob Dylan
- Boston
- Chris Stapleton
- Evanescence
- Goo Goo Dolls
- Jason Isbell
- Kendrick Lamar
- The Lumineers
- Matchbox Twenty
- The Monkees
- O.A.R.
- The Smashing Pumpkins
- Shawn Mendes
- Weezer
- Widespread Panic
- ZZ Top
- Vampire Weekend
- Bastille
- Old Dominion
- Rick Springfield
- Steve Miller Band
- Foster the People
- AJR
- Foreigner
- The Marshall Tucker Band
- Willie Nelson
- Jack Johnson
- Slayer
- John Legend
- Weezer
- Earth, Wind & Fire
- Lettuce
- Kansas
- The Doobie Brothers
- Cyndi Lauper
- 38 Special
- Styx
- Robert Plant
- Daryl Hall & John Oates
- Heart
- Two Door Cinema Club
- "Weird Al" Yankovic
- Paramore
- Twenty One Pilots
- Lynyrd Skynyrd
- Bad Company
- Joe Cocker
- Don Felder
- Sammy Hagar and the Circle
- Robert Plant
- Ted Nugent
- The Sonics
- John Fogerty
- Fabulous Thunderbirds
- Brian Wilson
- MC5
- Ringo Starr & His All-Starr Band
- The Smile
- Tenacious D

== Photos ==
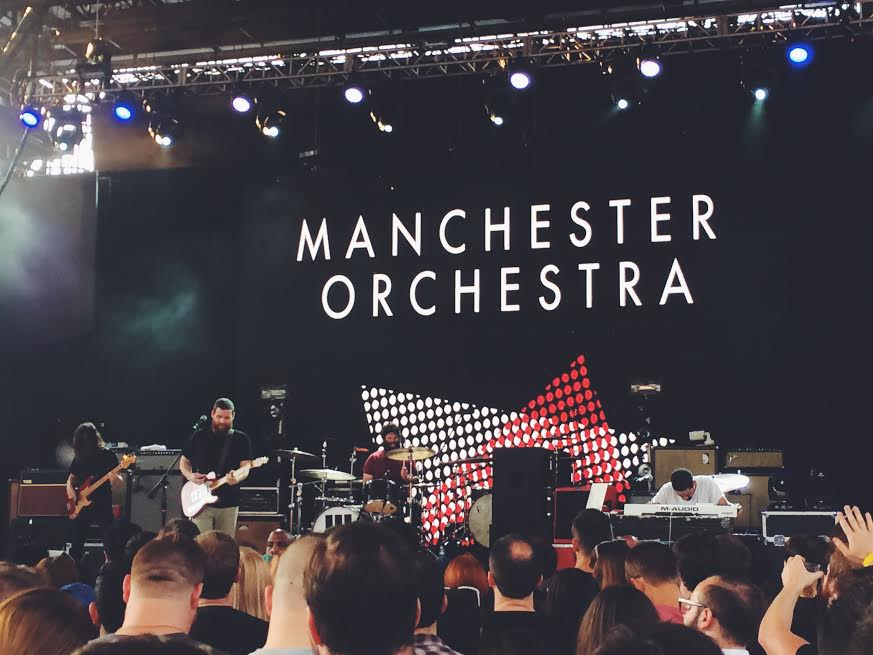
Manchester Orchestra

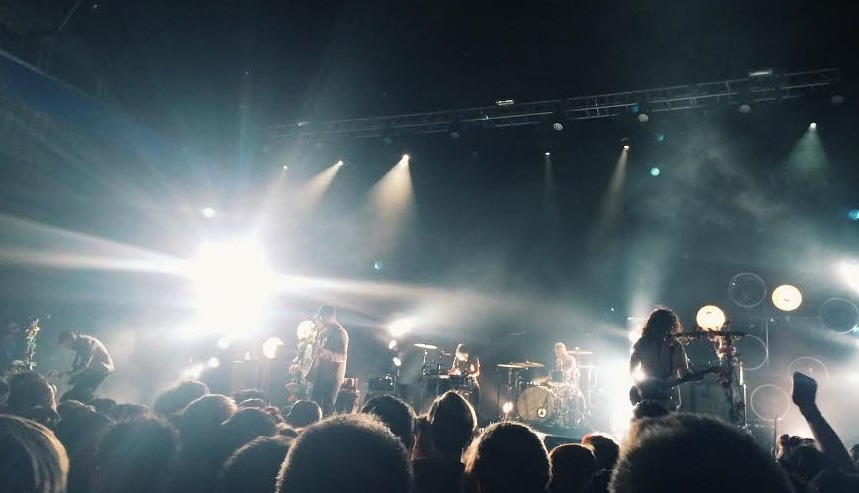
Brand New

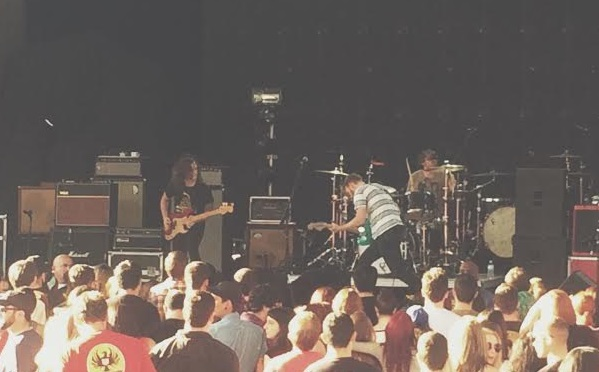
Kevin Devine

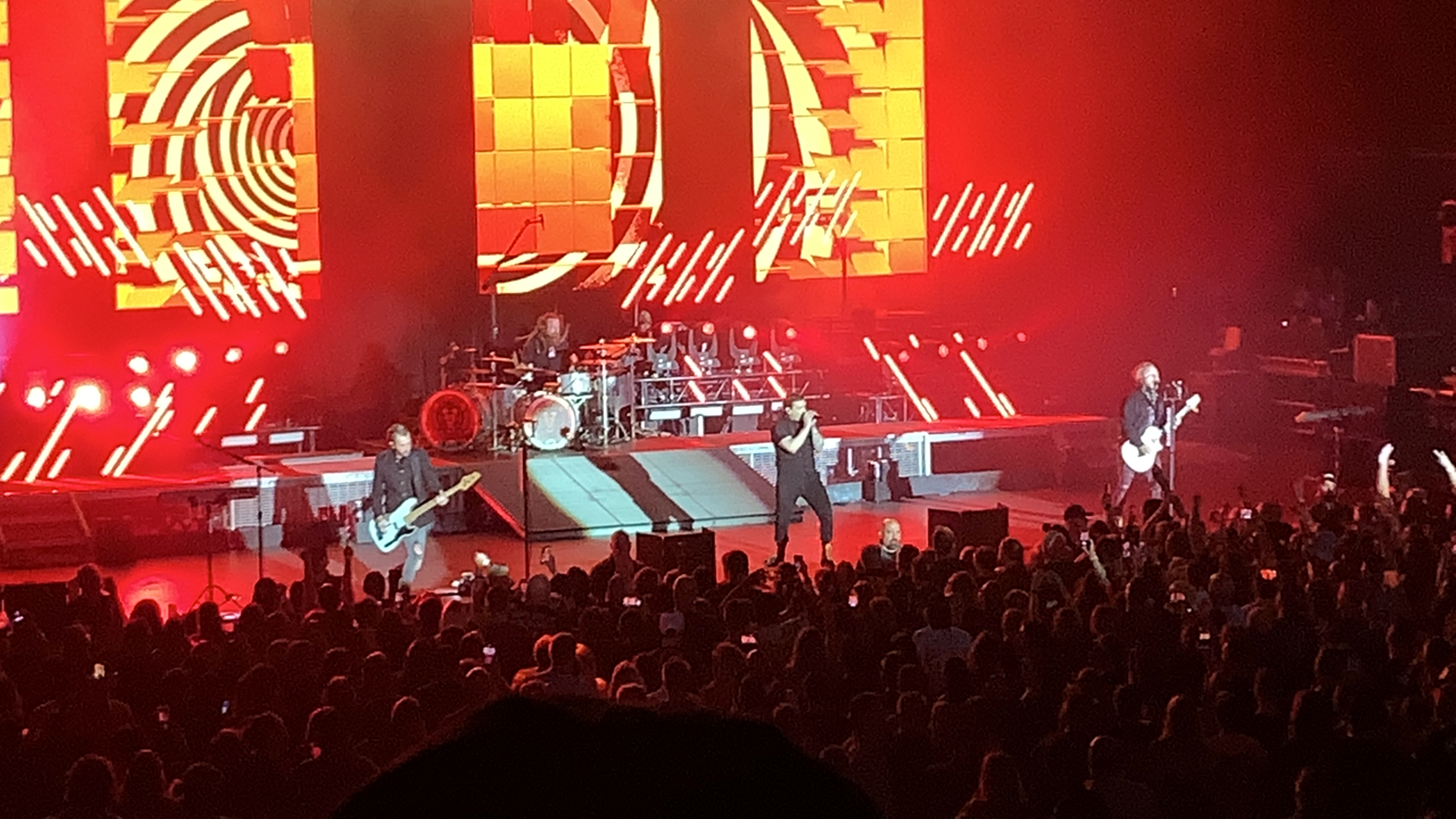
Shinedown

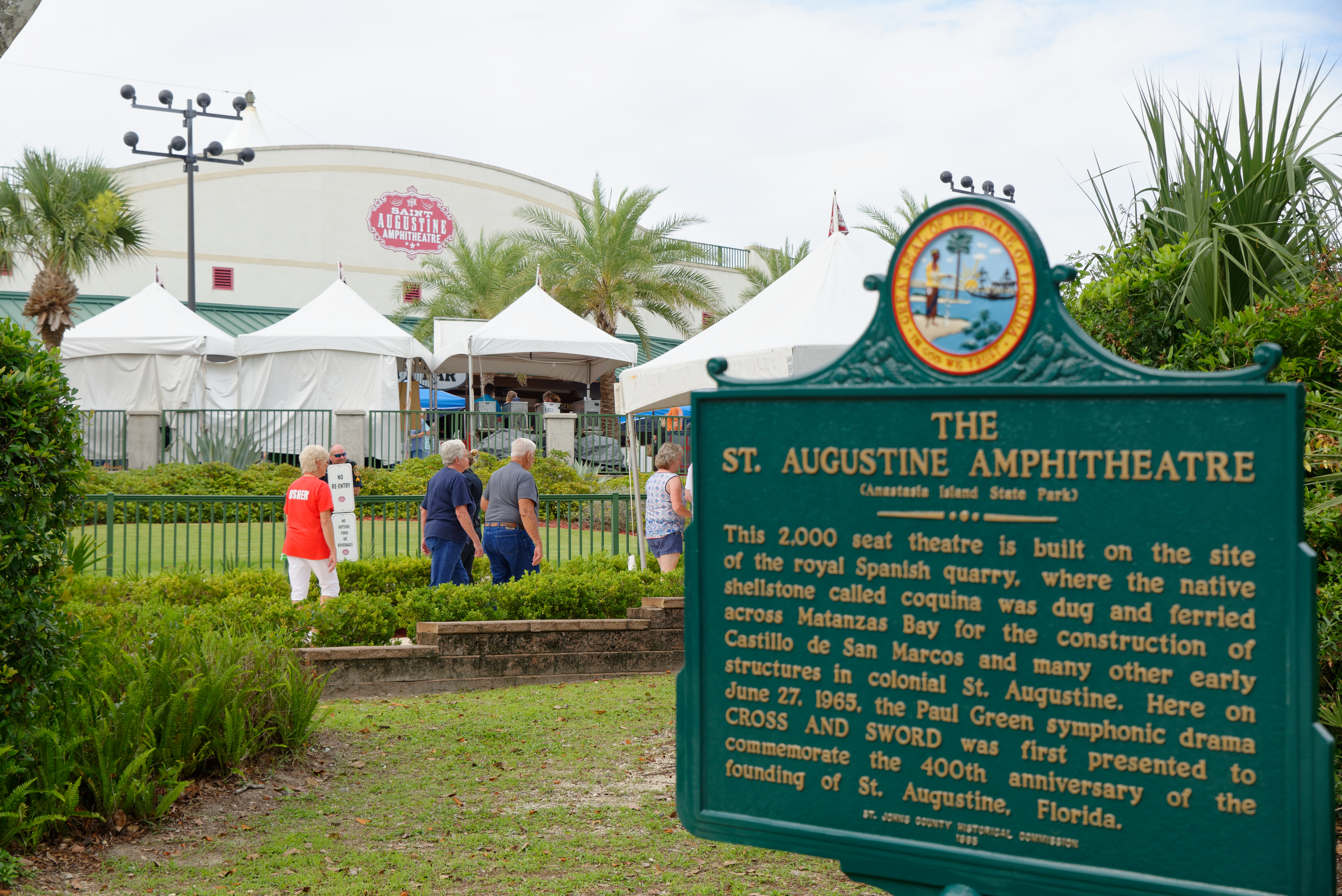
Amphitheatre with sign

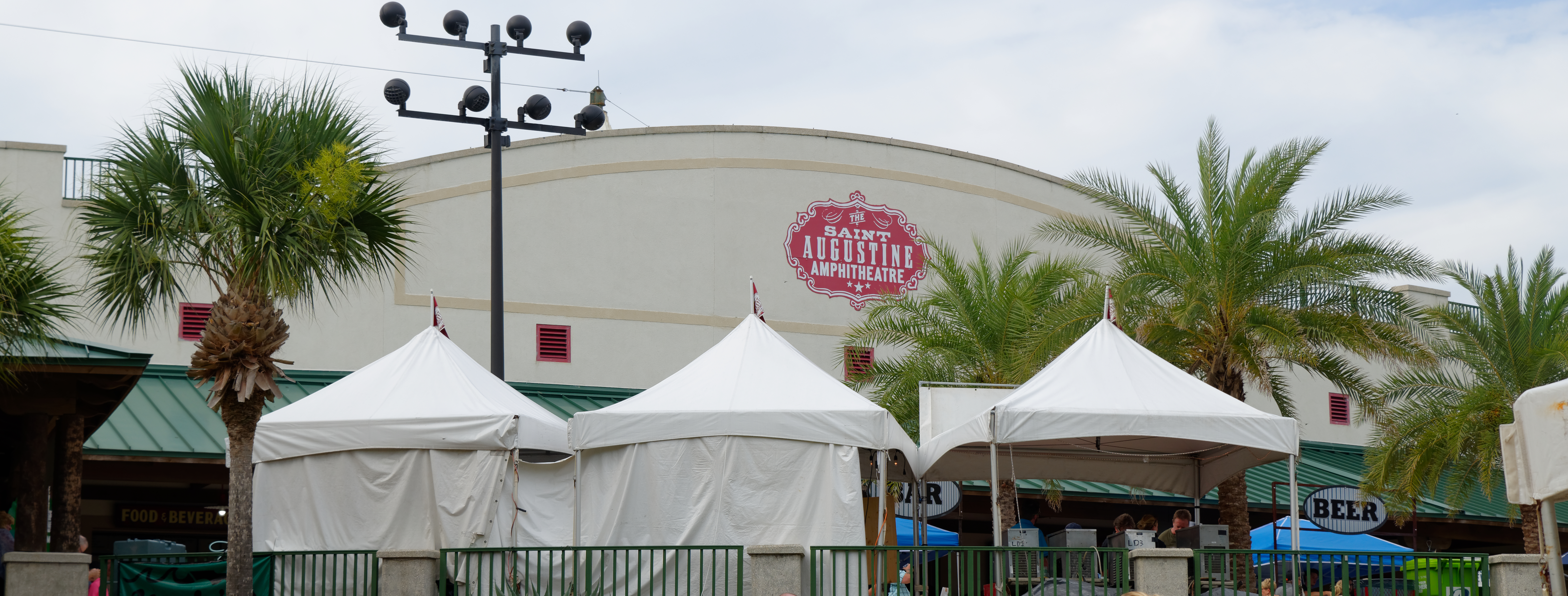
Amphitheatre
