= The Lost Colony (play) =

Play written by Paul Green

Playbill for the original 1937 production (click for full PDF)

The Lost Colony is an historical outdoor drama, written by American Paul Green and produced since 1937 in Manteo, North Carolina. It is based on accounts of Sir Walter Raleigh's attempts in the 16th century to establish a permanent settlement on Roanoke Island, then part of the Colony of Virginia. The play has been performed in an outdoor amphitheater located on the site of the original Roanoke Colony in North Carolina's Outer Banks. More than four million people have seen it since 1937. It received a special Tony Honors for Excellence in Theatre award in 2013.

== History ==
=== Background ===
The play was written during the Great Depression by Paul Green, who had earlier won the Pulitzer Prize for drama. The Lost Colony marked a shift in his work from more traditional forms of drama to focus on the creation of large-scale outdoor musical spectacles which he termed "Symphonic Dramas." As of 2012, this is the United States's second-longest-running historical outdoor drama, behind The Ramona Pageant produced in Southern California.

Before Jamestown and Plymouth were founded, a group of about 120 men, women and children made a second attempt at establishing the first English settlement in the New World on Roanoke Island in 1587 (the previous 1585 attempt on Roanoke Island having failed in 1586). Shortly after arriving in this New World, colonist Eleanor Dare, daughter of Governor John White of the colony, gave birth to her daughter Virginia Dare. The governor's granddaughter was believed to be the first English child born in North America.

Life on the island was difficult for the colonists. Low on supplies and facing retaliation from the Native Americans they had displaced, the colonists sent Governor White to England in the summer of 1587 for supplies. Because of the impending war with Spain, White was unable to return to Roanoke Island until 1590. When he arrived, he found no evidence of the colony, save the word "CROATOAN" carved into a palisade of the fort and a nearby tree with the letters "CRO" similarly inscribed. While some theories hold that the colonists died at the site, the fate of those first colonists remains a matter of scholarly debate.

=== 1937 premiere ===
On July 4, 1937, The Lost Colony first opened. Annual celebrations of Virginia Dare's birthday, August 18, had been celebrated by the Roanoke Colony Memorial Association since its founding in 1894. The early events were primarily picnic meetings, featuring hymn singing and commemorative speeches. In 1923, the festivities were expanded to include dramatic sketches. By 1925 local residents performed a full-scale pageant of the story, using pantomime, music, and narration. W. O. Sounders, editor of the Elizabeth City Independent, was a passionate supporter of the pageant and supported expanding the celebration.

Mabel Evans Jones, Roanoke Island native and Dare County School Superintendent, wrote, produced and starred in a 1921 silent film of the historic events. The film was shown across North Carolina. It was the first silent film produced in the state.

The 1926 pageant attracted the largest crowd to that point, and organizers sought to build on their achievement. They began to prepare to mark the 350th anniversary of Virginia Dare's birth. They approached North Carolina playwright Paul Green about developing a new pageant script.

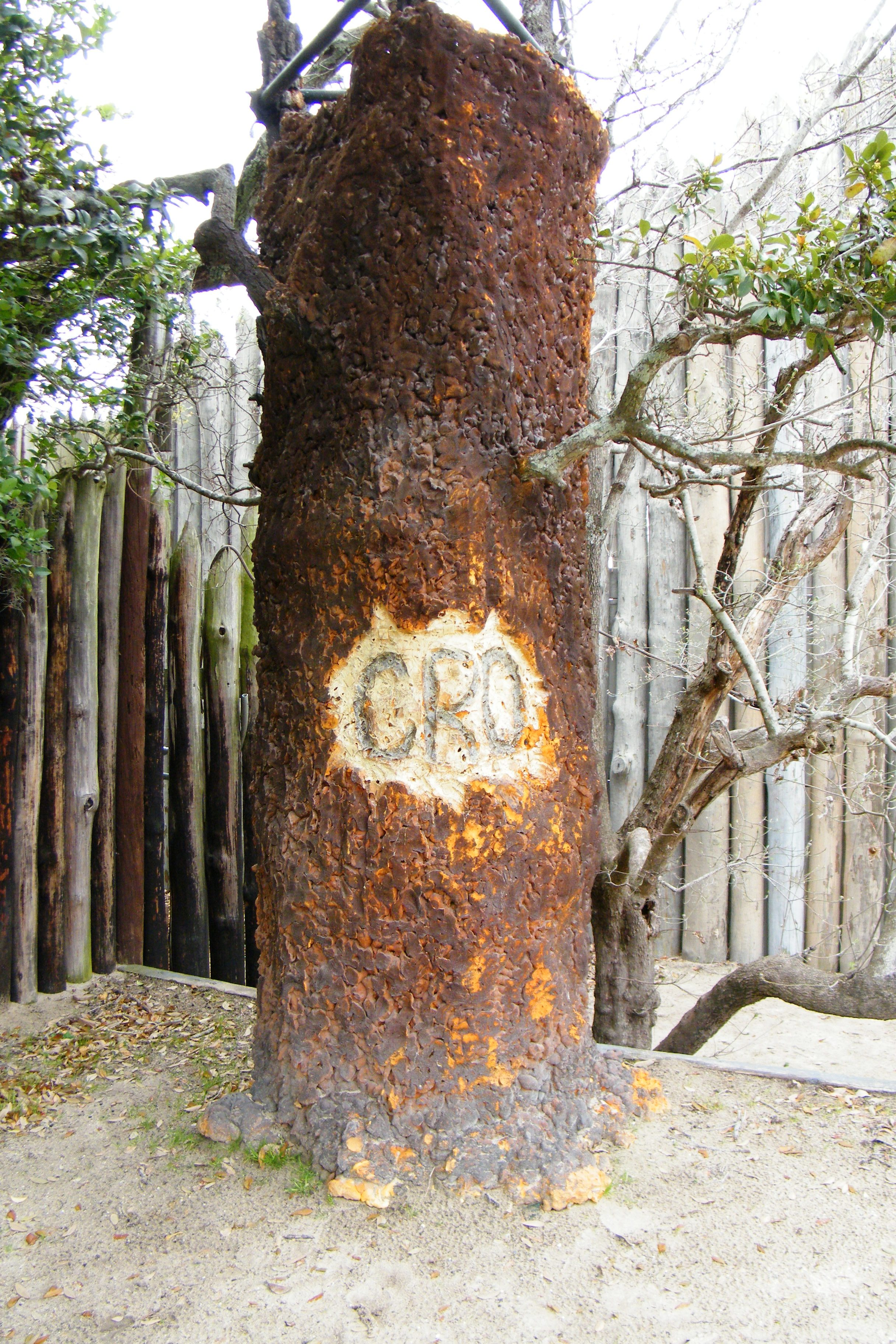
"CRO" tree prop

Having visited the island on several occasions, Green had already considered writing a piece about "those tragic first settlers." He joined with Saunders and Bradford Fearing, president of the Roanoke Historical Society, to develop a play to celebrate the 350th anniversary of Virginia Dare's birth. Initially, the team imagined a plot to tell the legend of Virginia Dare's falling in love with Chief Manteo's son and giving birth to a new race that has since vanished. To raise interest in the pageant, they planned to conduct a nationwide beauty contest to find a young woman to play Virginia Dare. But Green envisioned a spectacle with a combination of music, dialogue, and dance, which he called "symphonic drama". He wanted the drama to express community ideals of freedom, struggle, and perseverance—guiding themes for a nation in the grips of the Great Depression.

The original production had difficulty finding funding; early pledges of support evaporated as the depression deepened. The Works Progress Administration (WPA) of President Franklin D. Roosevelt helped provide funding and labor for the production through its various agencies; it supported theater groups, writers and artists among the people who were put to work during the Great Depression. North Carolina Congressman Lindsay Warren secured the production of 25,000 memorial half dollars to be sold to raise funds.

English-born architect Albert Quentin "Skipper" Bell began construction of the large-scale set with assistance from workers of the Civilian Conservation Corps (CCC). Previously, Bell had designed a village of log-structures on the grounds of Fort Raleigh.

Through the Federal Theatre Project, WPA funds were used for salaries as part of a Theatre Works initiative to assist out-of-work Broadway actors from New York City. English-born actress Katherine Cale starred as Eleanor Dare, Virginia's mother, while Lillian Ashton portrayed Queen Elizabeth I, Earl Mayo played the comic Old Tom, and Jack Lee narrated the production as The Historian. Other actors were hired to fill the major roles, with members of the Carolina Playmakers, Roanoke Islanders, and CCC taking the smaller roles.

The production was directed by Samuel Selden, one of Green's associates in the UNC Playmakers of Chapel Hill, under the supervision of Frederick H. Koch.

Music for the production was directed by Eric Stapleton, director of North Carolina's WPA Federal Music Project. It was drawn primarily from the types of old English hymns, ballads, and folk songs which the settlers likely carried with them. Lamar Stringfield, American composer and conductor, has been credited with composing the original music for the play. His contribution is not noted in the original program. The new Hammond electric organ was used to provide musical accompaniment. (By the late 1960s, this particular instrument had been transferred to a local Catholic church.)

President Franklin D. Roosevelt saw the production on August 18, 1937. He said, "We do not know the fate of Virginia Dare or the First Colony. We do know, however, that the story of America is largely a record of that spirit of adventure."

=== Radio adaptation ===
On August 23, 1939, CBS radio broadcast a one-hour adaptation of the play from the Waterside Theatre.

=== Costume shop fire ===
On September 11, 2007 a resident of Nags Head, North Carolina reported a fire across the sound. All fire departments north of Oregon Inlet responded to find part of the Waterside Theatre in flames. The fire crews worked to control the blaze. In spite of their efforts, the maintenance shed, Costume Shop, and a small storage building were completely destroyed. No cause has been determined.

Except for a few costumes stored at the dry cleaners and others on display at the North Carolina Museum of History in Raleigh, the production's costumes suffered a total loss. The destroyed costumes include vintage costumes created by Irene Rains in the 1940s and 1950s; all of Fred Voelpel's costumes made in the 1960s, 1970s and early 1980s, and the later costumes designed by William Ivey Long.

Recovery from the 2007 event relied on assistance from federal, state, and local sources in addition to donations from individuals and foundations. The costumes were replaced and the building was rebuilt for opening night on May 30, 2008.

=== Impact and longevity ===
The drama attracted enough tourists to stimulate the economy of Roanoke Island and the Outer Banks of North Carolina. Their hotels, motels, and restaurants thrived despite the bleak depression economy. The village of Manteo renamed its streets after historic figures in the drama. Originally intended for one season, the drama was produced again the following year and has since become a North Carolina tradition. Since 1937, more than four million visitors have seen it. Of the more than 40 annual outdoor dramas which were produced through the 20th century, The Lost Colony is one of three which has continued into the 21st century. In that time, only two seasons have been canceled: the 1944 season was canceled due to World War II and the 2020 season was canceled due to the COVID-19 pandemic.

As of 2024, the play has better sound and lighting and employs Native American actors, with an updated script showing how they actually speak and behave. Some people criticized the changes for making the play "woke".

== Notable alumni and artistic staff ==
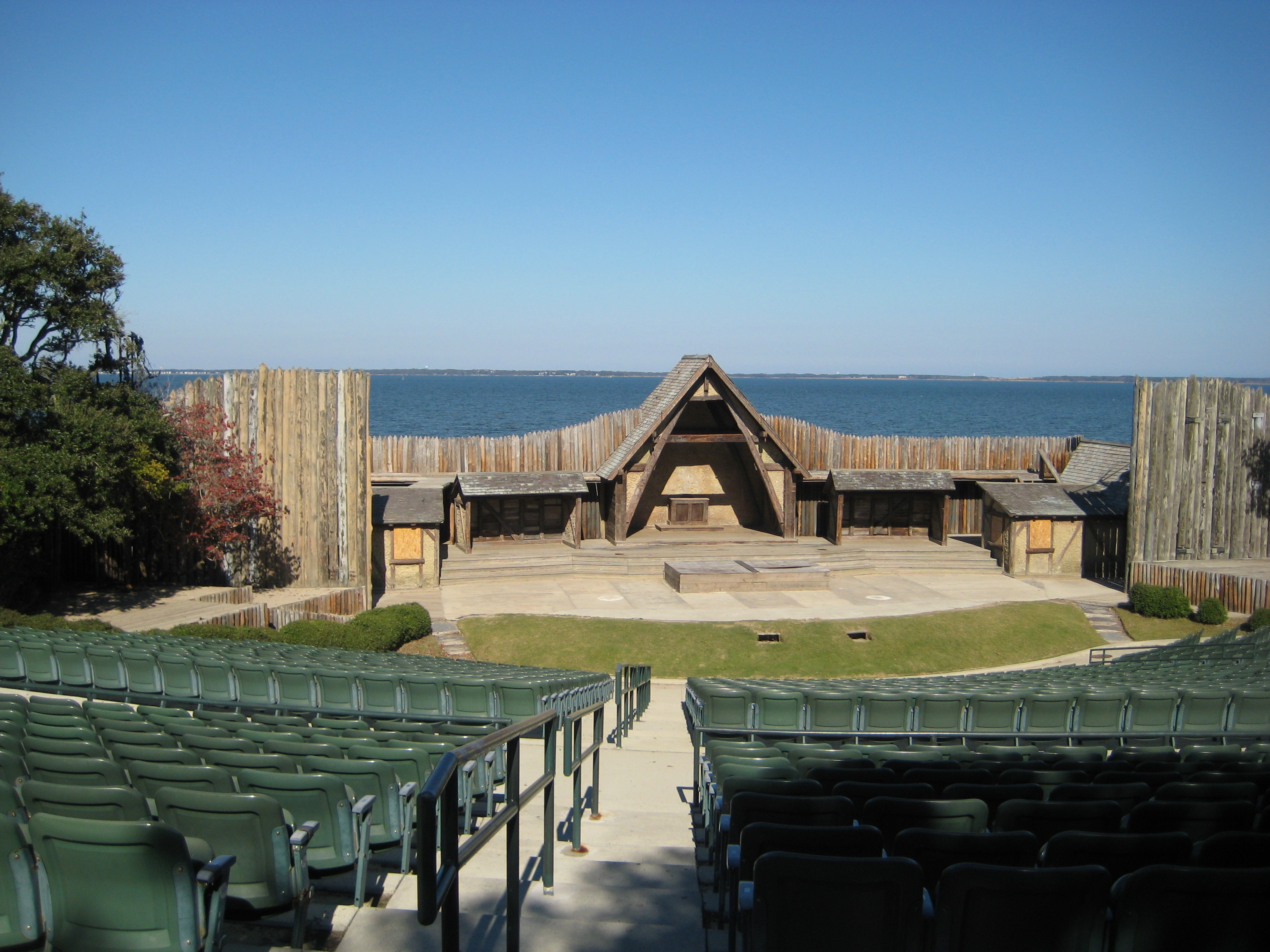
The waterside theatre on Roanoke Island where the play is performed.

The production is often referred to as a training and proving ground for young artists, and many use their summers as a launching pad for their professional careers with success on broadway, in film, television, theme parks, and beyond.

The drama has been a community effort, and many local Roanoke Islanders and North Carolinians have performed in it. Marjalene Thomas first performed with the show in 1938 and throughout the years played every female role — with the exception of one. Robert Midgette (fight director of The Lost Colony) has been with the show 40+ years. Actor Andy Griffith, who performed at the production's Waterside Theatre on Roanoke Island from 1947 to 1953, liked Manteo so much he decided to live there permanently. North Carolina State Senator Marc Basnight was born in Manteo; he performed in the role of a colonist child in the play.

Other notable alumni who got their stage legs at Waterside Theatre include Leon Rippy, Chris Elliott, Eileen Fulton, Terrence Mann, Ira David Wood III, Carl Kasell and R. G. Armstrong. Ted Tally spent a summer in the production long before winning top Academy Award honors for his screenplay of Silence of the Lambs.

2012 Tony Award winner Steve Kazee (Once: The Musical) played the leading role of John Borden in the 1990s.

Academy Award and Tony Award-nominee Lynn Redgrave played the supporting role of Queen Elizabeth I for seven performances during the show's 2006 season.

There are current artistic team members who started or nurtured their careers with The Lost Colony. This includes production designer William Ivey Long, winner of six Tony Awards for Best Costume Design.

== See also ==
- Long-running plays (non-musicals)
- Fort Raleigh National Historic Site
- Snow Camp Outdoor Theater
- Unto These Hills
- Horn in the West
