= Kermit Hunter =

American playwright

- Occupation: playwright

Kermit Houston Hunter (3 October 1910 – 11 April 2001) was an American playwright known primarily for writing historical outdoor dramas. His many works include two dramas for Cherokee tribes, one for the Eastern Band of Cherokee Indians in North Carolina and one written for the larger Cherokee Nation of Oklahoma.

== Early life, education and military service ==
Born in McDowell County, West Virginia, in 1910, Hunter attended local schools. He started higher education at Emory & Henry College in Emory, Virginia. He transferred to Ohio State University, where he graduated in 1931. At Ohio State, Hunter was initiated into the Theta Delta chapter of the Beta Theta Pi fraternity. After graduation, he held a number of jobs during the difficult years of the Great Depression.

Hunter joined the U.S. Army in 1940. After rising to the rank of lieutenant colonel during World War II, he was assigned as the assistant chief of staff of the Caribbean Defense Command. He was later awarded the Legion of Merit.

== Graduate work and academic career ==
After World War II, Hunter left the military and served as the business manager for the North Carolina Symphony. In 1947, Hunter decided to pursue graduate studies under the GI Bill in the Department of Dramatic Arts at the University of North Carolina at Chapel Hill. While he was enrolled, three of his plays were produced by the Carolina Playmakers, a dramatic group at the university.

The Cherokee Historical Association was looking for a playwright to write an historical outdoor drama about their people, to be performed in Cherokee, North Carolina, and Hunter won the commission. He wrote Unto These Hills (1950), which included history of the Cherokee from the early 19th century and illustrious ancestors. The play opened July 1, 1950, and is still produced at the Mountainside Theatre. This facility is owned and operated by the federally recognized Eastern Band of Cherokee Indians (EBCI).

The Cherokee Nation based in Tahlequah, Oklahoma, the largest tribe, also commissioned Hunter to write a drama. He completed The Trail of Tears. This drama covered their history and especially their forced removal to Oklahoma in 1838, then known as Indian Territory. This play was performed each summer from 1969 through 2005 at the Cherokee Heritage Center located south of Tahlequah.

After completing his master's degree, Hunter continued graduate studies at Chapel Hill. He received his Ph.D. in 1955, and started working as a professor of drama at Hollins College (now Hollins University) in Roanoke, Virginia.

In 1964, Hunter became the first dean of the Meadows School of Arts at Southern Methodist University in Dallas, Texas. After stepping down as dean in 1976, he served as a writer-in-residence at the university until 1978. He was named as a senior lecturer at the University of Texas at Arlington, where he taught until 1993. He died in Dallas on April 11, 2001.

Hunter wrote more than 40 historical dramas, which were performed in communities throughout the United States. It became a popular form in the second half of the 20th century, as Americans reflected on their history and widened their interest in groups who were part of that history. Of these, three continue to be produced: Unto These Hills, Horn in the West in Boone, North Carolina; and Honey in the Rock in Beckley, West Virginia. In other areas, changing tastes and competition from new media reduced the audiences so that local productions closed.

== Published works ==
- Beyond the Sundown
- Brighthope
- Chucky Jack
- Dust in Her Petticoats
- The Eleventh Hour
- Forever This Land
- The Home Road
- Honey in the Rock
- Horn in the West
- The Liberty Tree
- Next Day in the Morning
- Stars in My Crown
- The Bell and The Plow
- The Third Frontier
- The Trail of Tears
- Unto These Hills
- Voice in the Wind
- Walk Towards Sunset
