= Snow Camp Outdoor Theatre =

Outdoor theater and repertory theater company in Snow Camp, North Carolina

Coordinates: 35.8852°N 79.4361°W

Snow Camp Historical Drama Society
- Established: 1973
- Location: Snow Camp, North Carolina
- Website: Snow Camp Theatre

The Snow Camp Theatre is semi-professional theatre company in Snow Camp, an unincorporated community in southern Alamance County, North Carolina that brings the voices of the past into the hearts and minds of a modern audience from around the world by producing engaging historical dramas that inspire and entertain.

Its two key plays over the years have been Pathway to Freedom (1994) by Mark Sumner. and The Sword of Peace (1973) by William Hardy. Both plays examine local Quaker involvement in past events, especially the Revolutionary War and the Underground Railroad. The plays are set within the local context of the Cane Creek Friends Meeting, a Quaker congregation established October 7, 1751, in what is now southern Alamance County. (Snow Camp was for a time part of Guilford County during the Revolutionary-era events of Sword of Peace). The Cane Creek meetinghouse is a few hundred feet from the amphitheater.

In 2021, Studio 1 (a non-profit community theatre located in Burlington, NC) took over operations at Snow Camp Outdoor theatre. They have had four successful seasons of productions including the original historical plays as well as Shakespeare, fully produced musicals, children's shows, and seasonal festivals in the fall and winter.

== Pathway to Freedom ==
Pathway to Freedom is a drama about Quakers involved in supporting abolition and the Underground Railroad. Written by Chapel Hill dramatist Mark R. Sumner.

PATHWAY TO FREEDOM by Mark R. Sumner has been presented by the Snow Camp Historical Drama Society at Snow Camp, NC since 1994. The epic drama is an exciting account of the struggles and heroism of the 1840s and 1850s along the ‘Underground Railroad’ from North Carolina to Indiana. It tells of events and the people involved - chiefly anti-slavery North Carolinians and freed AA slaves—in the secret transportation of escaped slaves from central NC to Indiana, Ohio, and further north during the 1840s and 1850s. Although at this time several organized religions and individuals opposing slavery in the state held their anti-slavery activities to lawful means, many persons broke the law to participate in what came to be called the Underground Railroad. Although largely dealing with actual events, the drama’s story is fictional as are the main characters, which are based on composites of actual persons. Several characters, like Levi Coffin, Frederick Douglass, and Rutherford B. Hayes, are historical. The dramatic focus falls on George Vestal, the son of a slave-owning family, and the play chronicles how he becomes involved in the slave families in their hope of gaining freedom and dignity as individuals. The rich music in the play is based upon the music of the period and enriches the emotions that flow during the play.

The author’s theme, by his own admission, is that cooperative and compassionate action to support human freedom is more important than violence and revenge in furthering civilization.

In 1994, Ms. Myrick was selected from a list of candidates throughout the nation to direct for the United States Historical Outdoor Theater Association in North Carolina. In doing so, Ms. Myrick became the first woman and the first African American to direct a historical outdoor drama in America. Her production of "Pathway to Freedom" marked the premier of this award-winning and critically acclaimed play. Almost 25 years later, the show has been going strong. That same year, Ms. Myrick was commissioned by the House of Blues Foundation in New Orleans to write and direct a play about the history of the Blues. The play was so successful that it showcased at every ‘House of Blues’ in the country.

== The Sword of Peace ==
The Sword of Peace is a drama of the American Revolution war period and the struggle of the pacifist Quakers. Two days after the Battle of Guilford Court House, the British army moved south, where some stopped at Snow Camp and took over the house of Simon Dixon, patriarch of the Quaker community. It was first produced here in 1973.

Author William Hardy was an actor and novelist and a member of the faculty of the Department of Radio-Television and Motion Pictures at the University of North Carolina. He also served as a long-time director of Kermit Hunter's Unto These Hills, an outdoor drama about the Eastern Band of Cherokee Indians in the early 19th century, presented every summer since 1950 in Cherokee, North Carolina.

== See also ==
- The Lost Colony
- Unto These Hills
- Roots: The Saga of an American Family, parts of which also took place in Alamance County.
