= Horn in the West =

Outdoor dramma by Kermit Hunter

Coordinates: 36.20875°N 81.67086°W

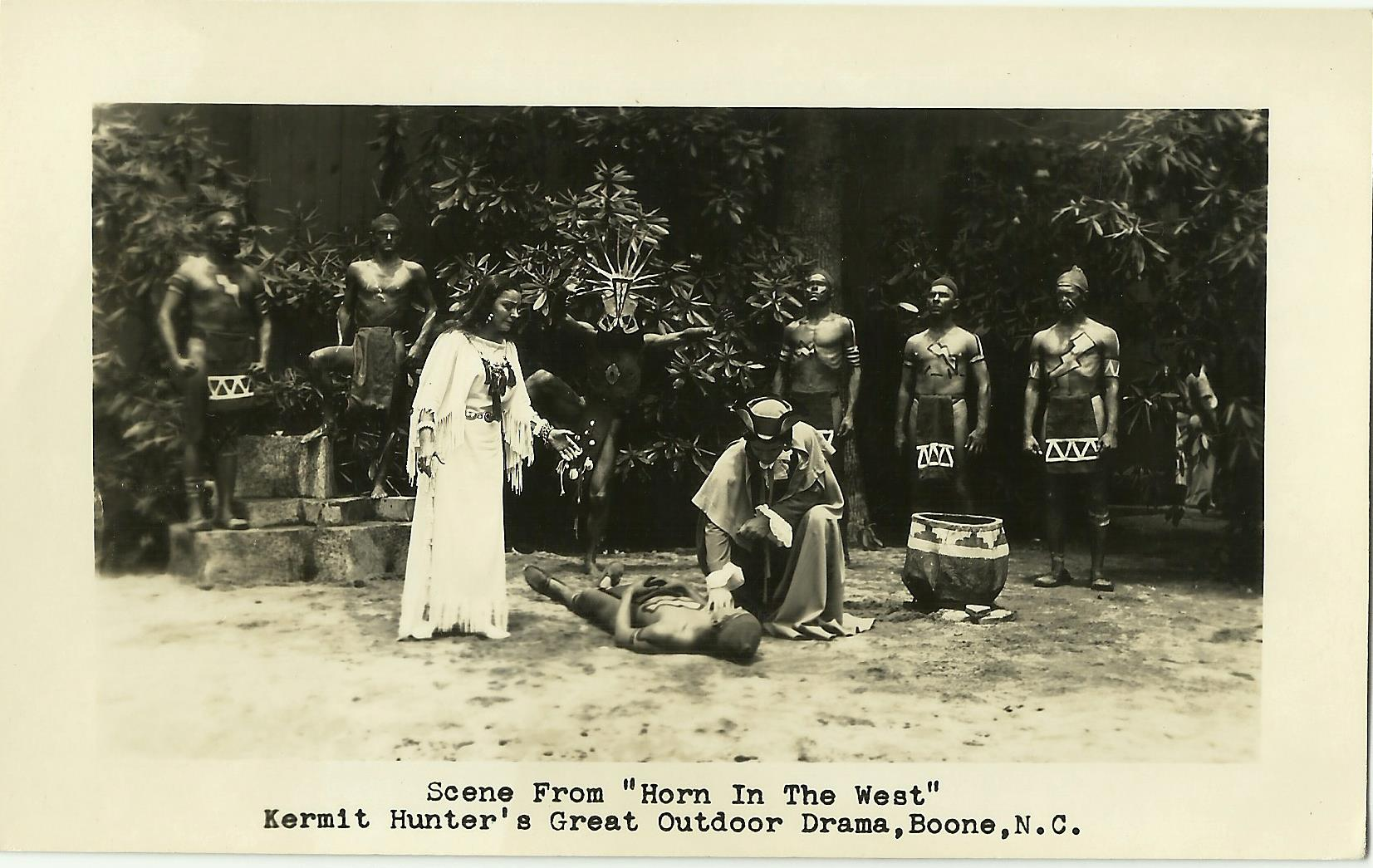

Horn in the West, written by playwright Kermit Hunter, is an outdoor drama produced every summer since 1952 in the Daniel Boone Amphitheater in Boone, North Carolina. The show, the oldest revolutionary war drama in the United States, is about the life and times of the hardy mountain settlers of western North Carolina and eastern Tennessee. It covers a time period during the American Revolution between the Battle of Alamance in 1771 and the Battle of King's Mountain in 1780. The story follows the family of Dr. Geoffrey Stuart, a British loyalist, who is forced to flee the lower colony due to the actions of his son during the Battle of Alamance. Led into the mountain country by frontiersman Daniel Boone, Stuart must come to terms with his own loyalties, which are divided between his country and his son.

The show also features a presence of historical Cherokee figures, most notably in a scene taking place in 'Cherokee Country'. Nancy Ward, Dragging Canoe, and Attakullakulla have all been present in different iterations of the script.

The show did not have its 69th season in 2020 due to the COVID-19 Pandemic, but resumed in 2021.

== Notable alumni ==
There have been hundreds of cast members in the show's long history, the four roles most often noted are those of Dr. Geoffrey Stuart, Daniel Boone, Jack Stuart, and Rev. Isaiah Sims, an itinerant Baptist circuit-riding preacher who befriends Stuart during his time in the mountains. Dr. Stuart has been portrayed by several actors over the years. William Ross originated the role of Dr. Stuart. James Maddux acted the role for several years; as did Mark Allen Woodard, who portrayed Dr. Stuart from 2003 until 2007; Andrew Dylan Ray, who portrayed the Doctor from 2008 to 2011; Ryan Gentry, who held the role in 2012 and 2013, and J. J. McCarson in 2014. Jeremy Homesley took over the role in 2023. The original performer cast as Daniel Boone in the show was Ned Austin, who played the role for three years (1952-1954) before moving on to perform in various other theatrical dramas and films. Austin was followed by Glenn Causey, who played Boone for forty-one years (1955-1996) before retiring from the drama, and was identified with the role in news reports following his passing in 2000; Wesley Martin, who assumed the role of the rugged frontiersman from 1998 until 2011; Joseph Watson in 2012 and 2013; Jon Mark Bowman; and Scott Loveless in 2018, 2021 through 2024.

The role of Preacher Sims was written into the show in 1956 for Charles C. Elledge, an original cast member, who went on to portray Rev. Sims until 1983. After Mr. Elledge left the role shortly before his death, the role went through a succession of actors, including Jerry Vencill, Ricky Joe Jessup, Doug Williams, and Darrell King, who performed in the role for over twenty years. For 2014, the role has been passed to Bradley Archer. Darrell King reprised the role in 2019. For the 2023 season, the 71st season of Horn in the West, Darrell King took on the role of Artistic Director.

Kai Jurgensen was the first artistic director of the show, followed by George McCalmon, Edgar Loessin, William Ross, David French, Gene Wilson, Ward Haarbauer, and Richard Ayers. Ed Pilkington took over as Artistic Director in 1971 and directed until 1991. Succeeding directors have included A. Lynn Lockrow, Dewey "Bud" Mayes, Michael Schialabba, and Cherie Elledge-Grapes, daughter of Charlie (Rev. Sims) Elledge. From 2008 to 2013, Julie A. Richardson took the reins of the show, and for the 2014 season, the duties of Director had been assumed by Teresa Lee, who left after the 2016 season. Chris Bellinger directed in 2017 and Britton Corry took over in 2018 and 2019.

== Southern Appalachian Historical Association ==
The Southern Appalachian Historical Association (SAHA) was formed to serve as the producing organization for Horn in the West in 1951, and as of 2023 still acts in that role. SAHA additionally operates the Hickory Ridge History Museum, which shares a 35-acre (140,000 m2) park in the center of the town of Boone with the Daniel Boone Amphitheater where Horn in the West is performed. Hickory Ridge, which was created in 1980, consists of six historic cabins from the Appalachian region dated from the 18th and 19th centuries, which are available for guests to visit in guided tours led by interpreters wearing period clothing. The cabins predate the museum's opening, the earliest being "The Tatum cabin" which was donated to SAHA in 1958 and served as "housing for the cast [of Horn in the West] for a few years," according to a former interpreter.

SAHA formerly operated the Powderhorn Theater, a "black box-style theater featuring seating for 75 people" that was located to the east of the Daniel Boone Amphitheater and was in use from 1964 to 2008 to allow Horn in the West cast members "a stage to expand their skills in other dramatic areas." The Powderhorn Theater was demolished in 2013 by the town of Boone after it was deemed structurally unsound as a matter of public safety.

A historic collection of SAHA documents, including documents related to organizational history, production materials for Horn in the West, productions at the Powderhorn Theater and Daniel Boone Amphitheater, the establishment of Daniel Boone Native Gardens, and the Hickory Ridge Homestead Museum, as well as miscellaneous regional research materials used by SAHA, can be found in the Special Collections Research Center at Appalachian State University. The W.L. Eury Appalachian Collection was designated as the official repository for SAHA records by SAHA's board of directors, with donations occurring in 1995 and 2000, and the collection was processed in 2004-2005, reprocessed in 2010, and reprocessed again in 2014.

== Other organizations in the Horn in the West park ==
The 35-acre park that serves as the home of Horn in the West is licensed by SAHA from the town of Boone, and several other organizations share this lot. The Daniel Boone Native Gardens, which is operated by a separate non-profit organization from SAHA, can be found on this lot.

== See also ==
- Long-running plays (non-musicals)
- The Lost Colony (play)
- Unto These Hills
- Snow Camp Outdoor Theatre
