= Fort Raleigh National Historic Site =

National Historic Site of the United States

- U.S. National Register of Historic Places
- U.S. National Historic Site
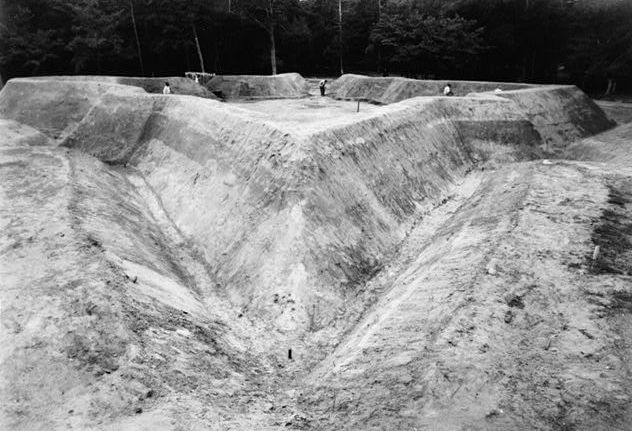
- Fort Raleigh during reconstruction (1950)

- Location within North Carolina Location within the United States
- Location: Dare County, North Carolina
- Nearest city: Manteo, North Carolina
- Coordinates: 35°56′19″N 75°42′36″W
- Area: 14 acres (5.7 ha)
- Built: 1585
- Architect: Ralph Lane
- Visitation: 266,775 (2025)
- Website: Fort Raleigh National Historic Site
- NRHP reference No.: 66000102
- Added to NRHP: October 15, 1966

Fort Raleigh National Historic Site preserves the location of Roanoke Colony, the first English settlement in the present-day United States. The site was preserved for its national significance in relation to the founding of the first English settlement in North America, resettled in 1587 after it was initially in 1585. The colony, which was promoted and backed by entrepreneurs led by Englishman Sir Walter Raleigh (c. 1554–1618), failed sometime between 1587 and 1590 when supply ships failed to arrive on time. When next visited, the settlement was abandoned with no survivors found. The fate of the "Lost Colony" was a celebrated mystery, although most modern academic sources agree that the settlers likely assimilated into local indigenous tribes.

The historic site is off U.S. Highway 64 on the north end of Roanoke Island, North Carolina, about 3 miles (4.8 km) north of the town of Manteo. The visitor center's museum contains exhibits about the history of the English expeditions and colonies, the Roanoke Colony, and the island's Civil War history and Freedmen's Colony (1863–1867).

== History ==
The Union Army occupied the island in 1862 and soon established a contraband camp for slave refugees. It founded the Roanoke Island Freedmen's Colony in 1863 to be self-sustaining. The free residents of the colony were allocated plots of land by household, paid by the Army for work, and educated with the help of Northern teachers. By 1864 the colony had more than 2200 freedpeople as residents. It had a sawmill, fisheries and 600 cabins. More than 150 freedmen from the colony were among the nearly 4000 freedmen from North Carolina who served with the United States Colored Troops. The colony is commemorated with a marble monument erected at the fort site in 2001 by Dare County.

The Fort Raleigh historic site is home to Paul Green's outdoor symphonic drama The Lost Colony. This work about the earliest colonists has been performed in the Waterside Theatre during the summer since 1937, with an interlude during World War II. It is presented by the Roanoke Island Historical Association.

== Administrative history ==
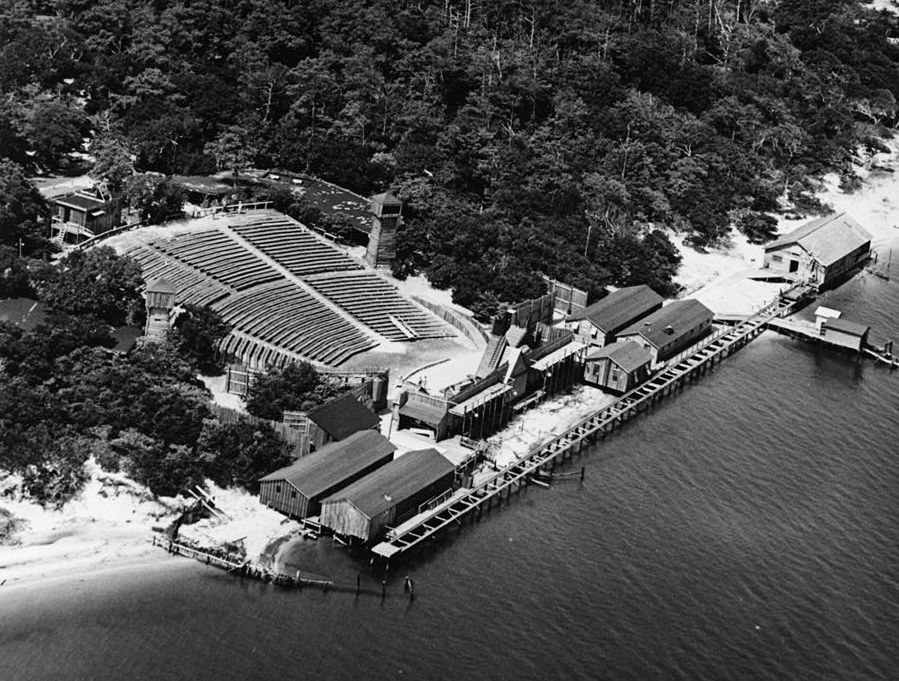
Waterside Theatre

Fort Raleigh National Historic Site was established on April 5, 1941, through a transfer of property to the National Park Service under a co-operative agreement with the Roanoke Island Historical Association (RIHA) and Acting Secretary of the Interior Alvin J. Wirtz, using authority provided under the Historic Sites Act of 1935. As with all historic areas administered by the National Park Service, the site was listed on the National Register of Historic Places on October 15, 1966.

Fort Raleigh is co-managed with two other Outer Banks parks, Wright Brothers National Memorial and Cape Hatteras National Seashore. It is the location of the group headquarters at the northern end of Roanoke Island. The cooperative agreement of 1941 allows RIHA to stage theatrical performances in the Waterside Theatre, also on park property.

== Elizabethan Gardens ==
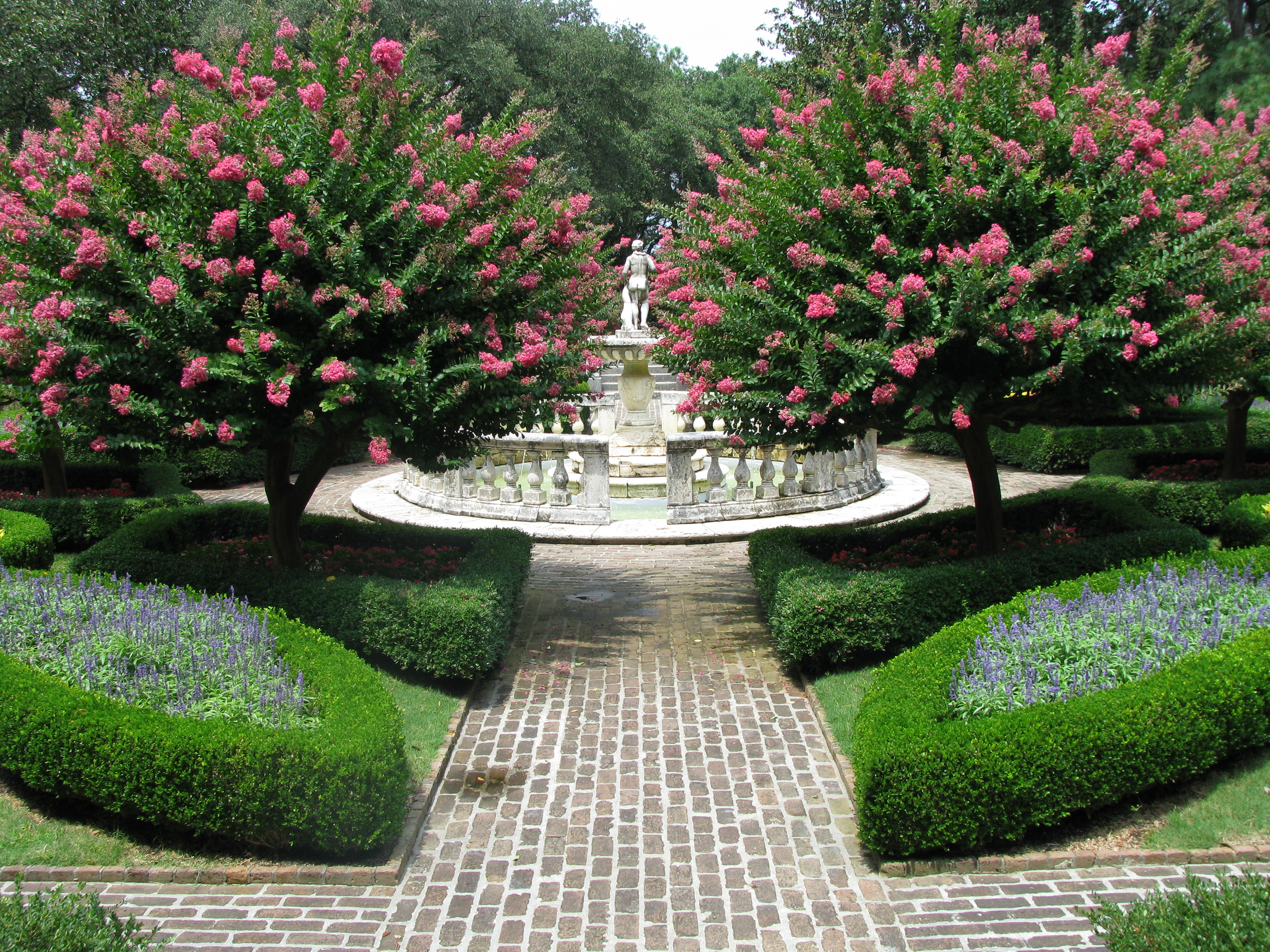
The sunken gardens at the Elizabethan Gardens

Within the historic site are the Elizabethan Gardens, managed by the Garden Club of North Carolina, created as a memorial to the first colonists and as an example of a period garden. The gardens cover more than 10 acres (4.0 ha) and include a replica Tudor gatehouse. There is a separate fee for the gardens.

Over 500 species of plants are planted on the property. The garden, built in the mid-20th century to honor Queen Elizabeth I, is open daily year round and holds seasonal events such as educational tours in the summer and holiday light displays in the winter. The attraction is also a popular Outer Banks wedding venue.
