= Lamar Stringfield =

American classical composer

Lamar Edwin Stringfield (October 10, 1897 – January 21, 1959) was a classical composer, flutist, symphony conductor, and anthologist of American folk music.

== Early career ==
He was born in Raleigh, North Carolina and studied at Mars Hill College near Asheville, North Carolina and Wake Forest University before joining the army in 1916. In the service, he played with the 105th Engineers regimental band stationed in France during World War I. He studied composition in Paris with Nadia Boulanger and later graduated with a diploma in flute performance from the Institute of Musical Art (1924), having studied with Georges Barrère. A highly respected flutist and composer of flute music, Stringfield was a founding officer of the New York Flute Club in 1920 along with William Kincaid (later principal flutist of the Philadelphia Orchestra) and Georges Barrère of the New York Symphony Orchestra (predecessor of the New York Philharmonic). The Club has featured the world's most prominent flutists in performance and other programs for over ninety years.

== Conducting ==
Stringfield conducted orchestra concerts in Asheville beginning in the 1920s, organizing the predecessor to the Asheville Symphony Orchestra for an exhibition concert in 1927. Stringfield won the Pulitzer Travelling Fellowship for his musical composition, From the Southern Mountains in 1928. He founded the North Carolina Symphony in Chapel Hill in 1932 serving as conductor until 1938. He was associate conductor at the Radio City Music Hall for the 1938–1939 season, was appointed Music Director of the Charlotte Symphony in 1945 and conductor of the Knoxville Symphony Orchestra in 1946, serving for only one season before returning to conduct the Charlotte Symphony for the 1948–1949 season. Guest conducting engagements included the National Symphony Orchestra (November 13, 1932), United States Navy Band in 1936, the Miami Symphony, New York Civic and Festival Orchestras, in addition to numerous other regional orchestras.

== Folk music and legacy ==
He had a deep interest in folk music, publishing a book of arrangements of Appalachian folk songs with Bascom Lamar Lunsford in 1929 and founding the Institute of Folk Music at the University of North Carolina at Chapel Hill in 1930. Working closely with Pulitzer Prize-winning playwright Paul Eliot Greene, he contributed music for The Lost Colony (as of 2009, the United States' second longest running historical outdoor drama) in 1937 and four other works.

The Lamar Stringfield papers at the University of North Carolina Chapel Hill included Stringfield's correspondence with Robert Russell Bennett, Percy Goetschius, Edwin Franko Goldman, Morton Gould, Paul Green, Thor Johnson, Geoffrey O'Hara, Winfred Overholser, Jan Peerce, John Powell, Howard Richardson, Arthur Shepherd, and Leopold Stokowski, in addition to many of his works.
