= Paul Green (playwright) =

American playwright (1894–1981)

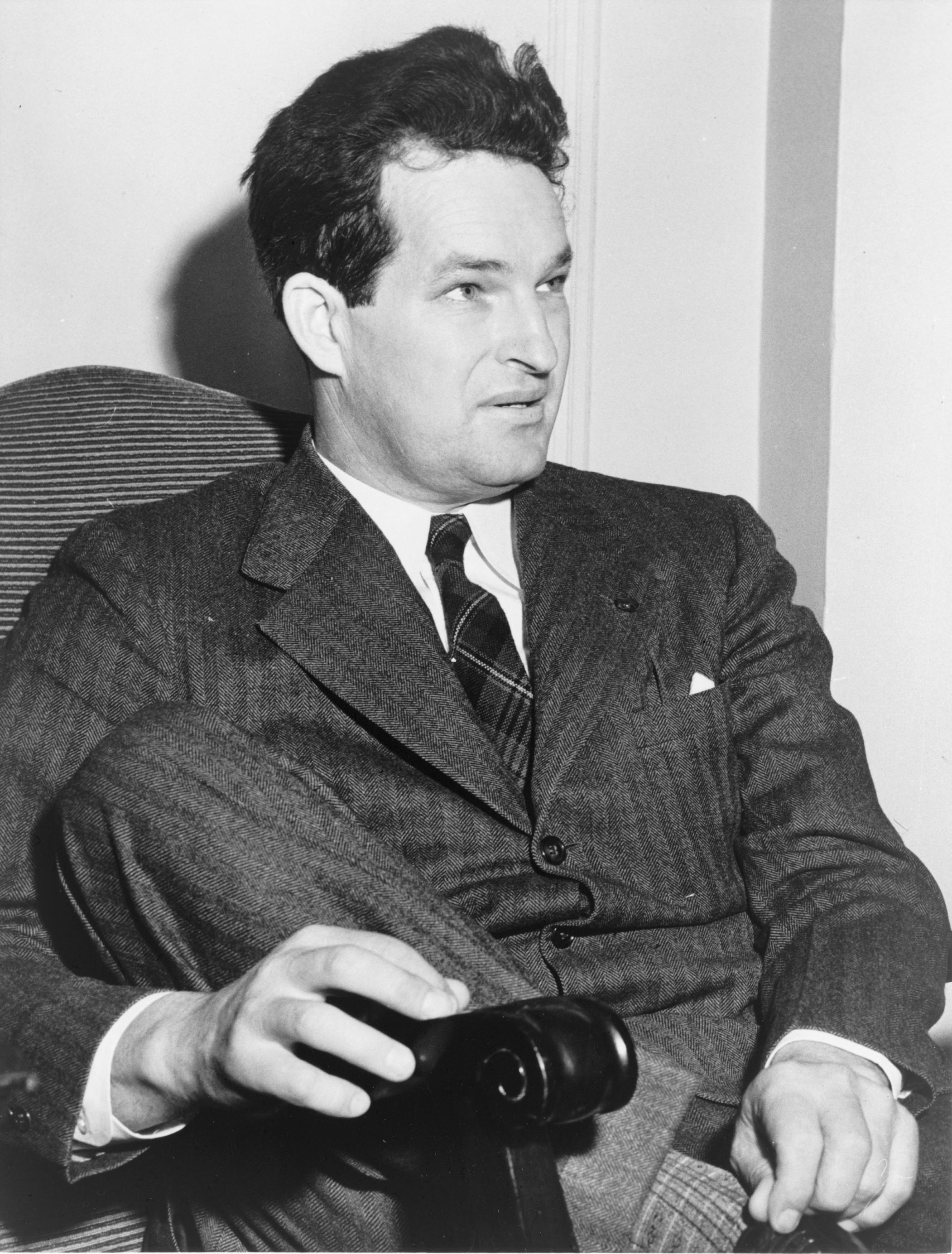
- Born: March 17, 1894; Lillington, North Carolina, US
- Died: May 4, 1981 (aged 87); Chapel Hill, North Carolina, US
- Education: Campbell University; University of North Carolina, Chapel Hill (BA); Cornell University (MA)
- Spouse: Elizabeth Lay
- Writing career
- Period: Expressionist
- Notable awards: Pulitzer Prize for Drama (1927)

Paul Eliot Green (March 17, 1894 – May 4, 1981) was an American playwright whose work includes historical dramas of life in North Carolina during the first decades of the twentieth century. He received the Pulitzer Prize for Drama for his 1927 play, In Abraham's Bosom, which was included in Burns Mantle's The Best Plays of 1926-1927.

His play The Lost Colony has been regularly produced since 1937 near Manteo, North Carolina, and the historic colony of Roanoke. Its success has resulted in numerous other historical outdoor dramas being produced; his work is still the longest-running.

== Biography ==
Born in Buies Creek, in Harnett County, near Lillington, North Carolina, Green was educated at Buies Creek Academy. (It developed as what is now known as Campbell University). He went on to study at the University of North Carolina at Chapel Hill, where he joined the Dialectic and Philanthropic Societies and the Carolina Playmakers. Green also studied at Cornell University.

Green first attracted attention with his 1925 one-act play The No 'Count Boy, which was produced by the New York Theatre Club. The next year his full-length play In Abraham's Bosom (1926) was produced by the Provincetown Players and received the Pulitzer Prize for Drama. The play was considered remarkable for its depiction of African Americans in the South. Its hero, a man of mixed-race ancestry, finds his idealistic attempts to better the lives of the African Americans around him doomed to failure. With this success, Green was recognized as one of the leading regional voices in the American theatre. His plays were often compared with the folk plays of Irish playwright John Millington Synge. This included his 1926 play, The Last of the Lowries, a fictional account of Henry Berry Lowry, a mixed-race leader of the Lumbee people during and after the Civil War.

Green's The House of Connelly was a tragedy of the decline of an old Southern family. It was chosen by the newly formed Group Theatre for its inaugural production. Often compared to Anton Chekhov's The Cherry Orchard in its contrast of aristocratic decay and parvenu energy, The House of Connelly was praised by critic Joseph Wood Krutch as Green's finest play to date.

=== Expressionism ===
But Green had begun to shift from the realistic style of his early work. In 1928–29 he traveled to Europe on a Guggenheim Fellowship and was impressed by the non-realistic productions that he saw there. He began to experiment with expressionism and the Epic theatre of Bertolt Brecht and Erwin Piscator. In the 1930s Green largely abandoned the New York theatre, whose commercialism he found distasteful. His experiments in non-realistic drama, Tread the Green Grass (1932) and Shroud My Body Down (1934), both premiered in Chapel Hill. They were never professionally produced in New York.

During the summer of 1936, Green, Cheryl Crawford, Kurt Weill and Weill's wife Lotte Lenya rented an old house in Nichols, Connecticut, near the summer rehearsal headquarters of the Group Theatre at Pine Brook Country Club. Green returned to the Group Theatre to write his pacifist musical play, Johnny Johnson, with a score by Kurt Weill. In it, Green experimented with genre, writing the first act as a comedy, the second as a tragedy, and the third as a satire. During this time he had an affair with Lotte Lenya, which would be her first American love affair.

The production encountered problems of style early on: set designer Donald Oenslager designed the first act in poetic realism, the second in expressionism, and the final act in an extremely distorted style, director Lee Strasberg wanted to stage it realistically, and others in the company wanted it to be staged expressionistically throughout. Reviews ranged from the enthusiastic to the dismissive. The play closed after 68 performances.

=== Outdoor drama ===
Green created a new dramatic form that he called symphonic drama. Inspired by historical events, it incorporated music and pageantry, usually for outdoor performance. His first experiment in this form was Roll Sweet Chariot (1934), which ran for four performances on Broadway. Much more warmly received was the first of his outdoor symphonic dramas, The Lost Colony (1937), with music by Lamar Stringfield. Based on the Lost Colony of Roanoke and produced during the Great Depression, it is still produced during the summers in an outdoor theater at Fort Raleigh National Historic Site near Manteo, North Carolina. The Lost Colony is the oldest outdoor historical drama in the United States and is one of three still being performed. It has become a community institution.

Among Green's other outdoor symphonic dramas are Faith of Our Fathers, Wilderness Road, Texas, The Common Glory; The Founders; and Trumpet in the Land, which tells the story of the European-American massacre of Native American Christian Moravians in Gnadenhutten, Ohio, during the American Revolution; Cross and Sword, the state play of Florida; and The Stephen Foster Story, which continues to be played each summer in Bardstown, Kentucky.

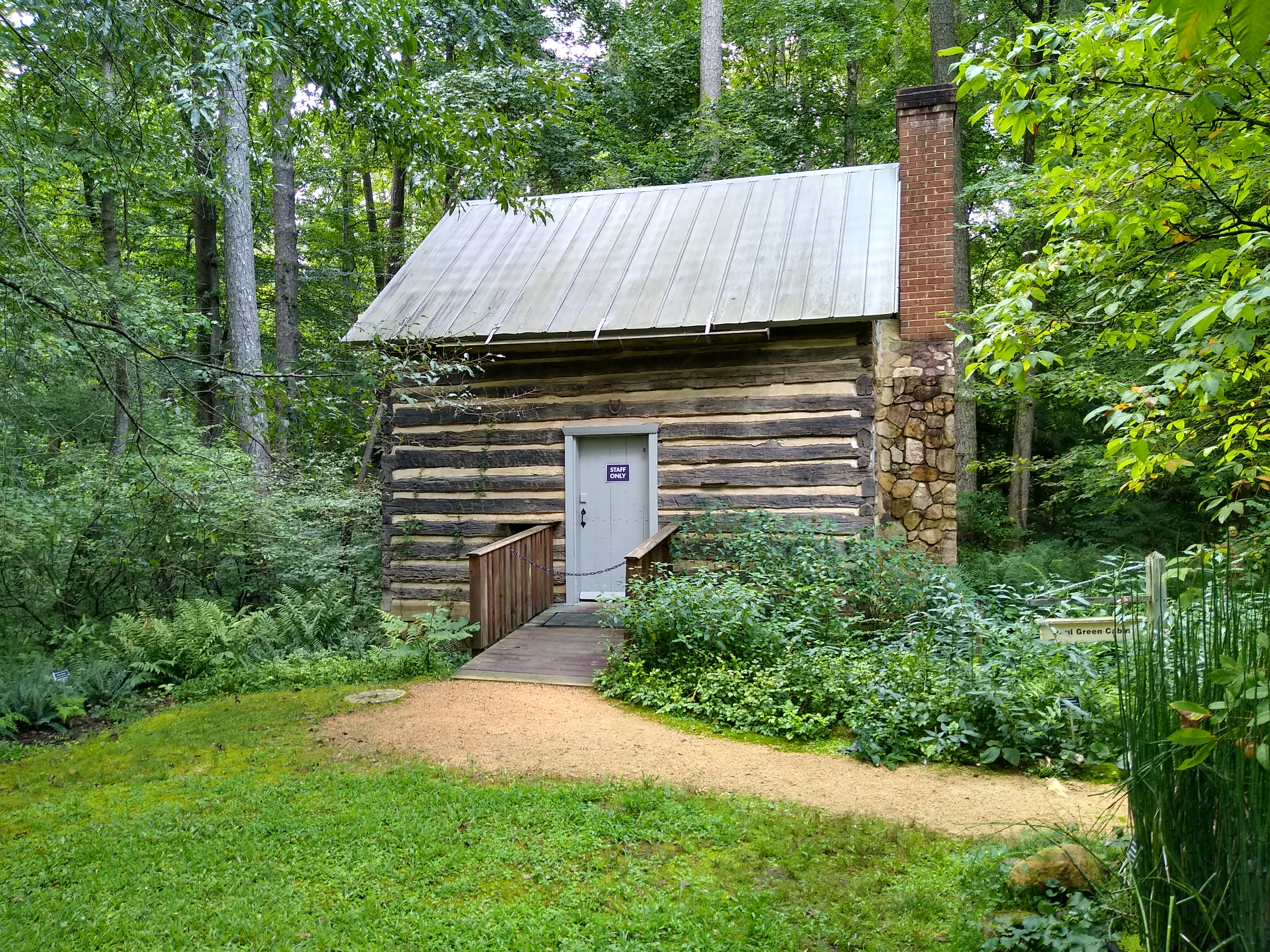
Paul Green Cabin at the North Carolina Botanical Garden

== The cabin ==
In 1936, Green noticed a small log cabin standing in a rural area of North Carolina―he bought it, had it taken apart, moved, and put back together at his home in Chapel Hill, North Carolina. He then used the cabin as a writing retreat. After his death, the cabin was moved to the North Carolina Botanical Garden where it is preserved as an exhibit open to the public.

== Other artistic endeavors ==
Green also wrote screenplays: The Cabin in the Cotton (1932) and State Fair (1933). He also wrote extensively on the subject of his beloved North Carolina. He helped Richard Wright adapt his novel Native Son for the stage in 1940. It was first performed 24 March 1941 by the Mercury Theatre of Orson Welles and John Houseman.

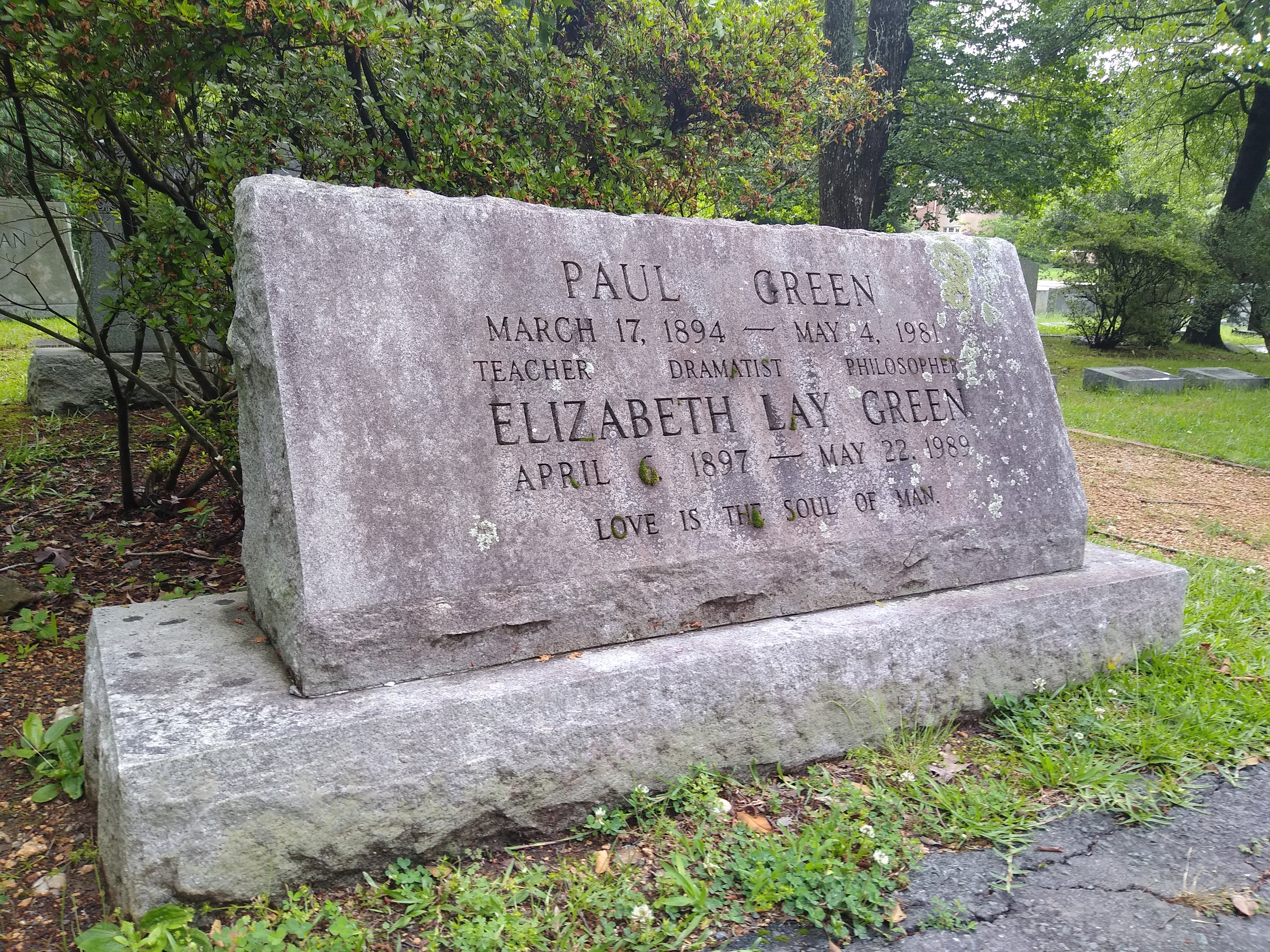
Gravestone of Paul Green and Elizabeth Lay Green at the Old Chapel Hill Cemetery

Green founded the North Carolina Symphony Orchestra and the Institute for Outdoor Drama. He served UNESCO traveling around the world to lecture on human rights and drama. Green served as a professor of drama at UNC until his death in 1981.

== See also ==
- North Carolina literature
