= The Ramona Pageant =

Play performed annually in Hemet, California

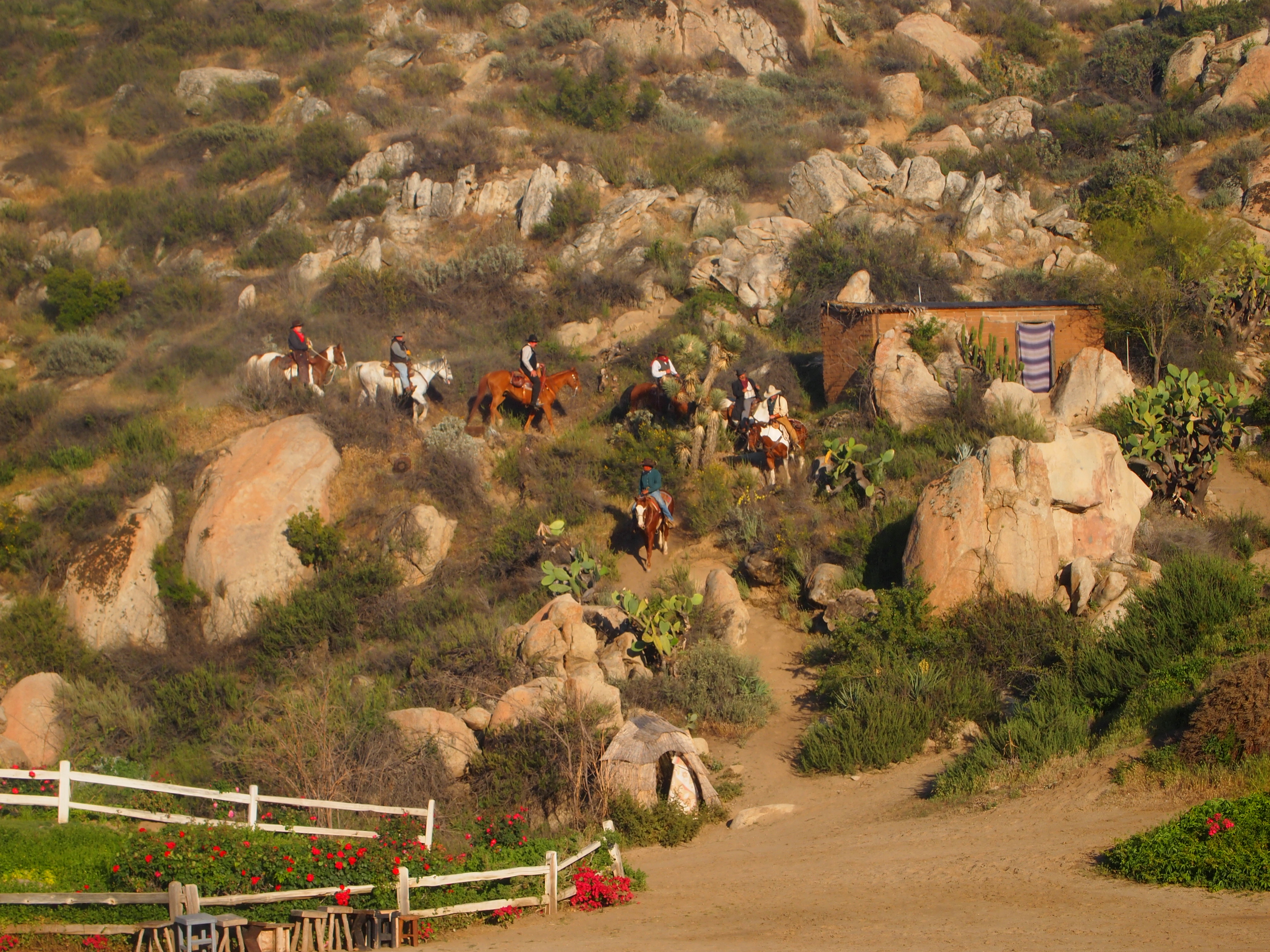
- The Ramona Pageant in 2013
- Original language: English
- Written by: Helen Hunt Jackson (1884 book); Garnet Holme (1923 adaptation); Stephen Savage (2015 update)
- Subject: Ramona
- Genre: Drama/Romance/Comedy
- Setting: 1850s California

Premiere
- Date: April 13, 1923
- Place: Hemet, California

Ramona Bowl
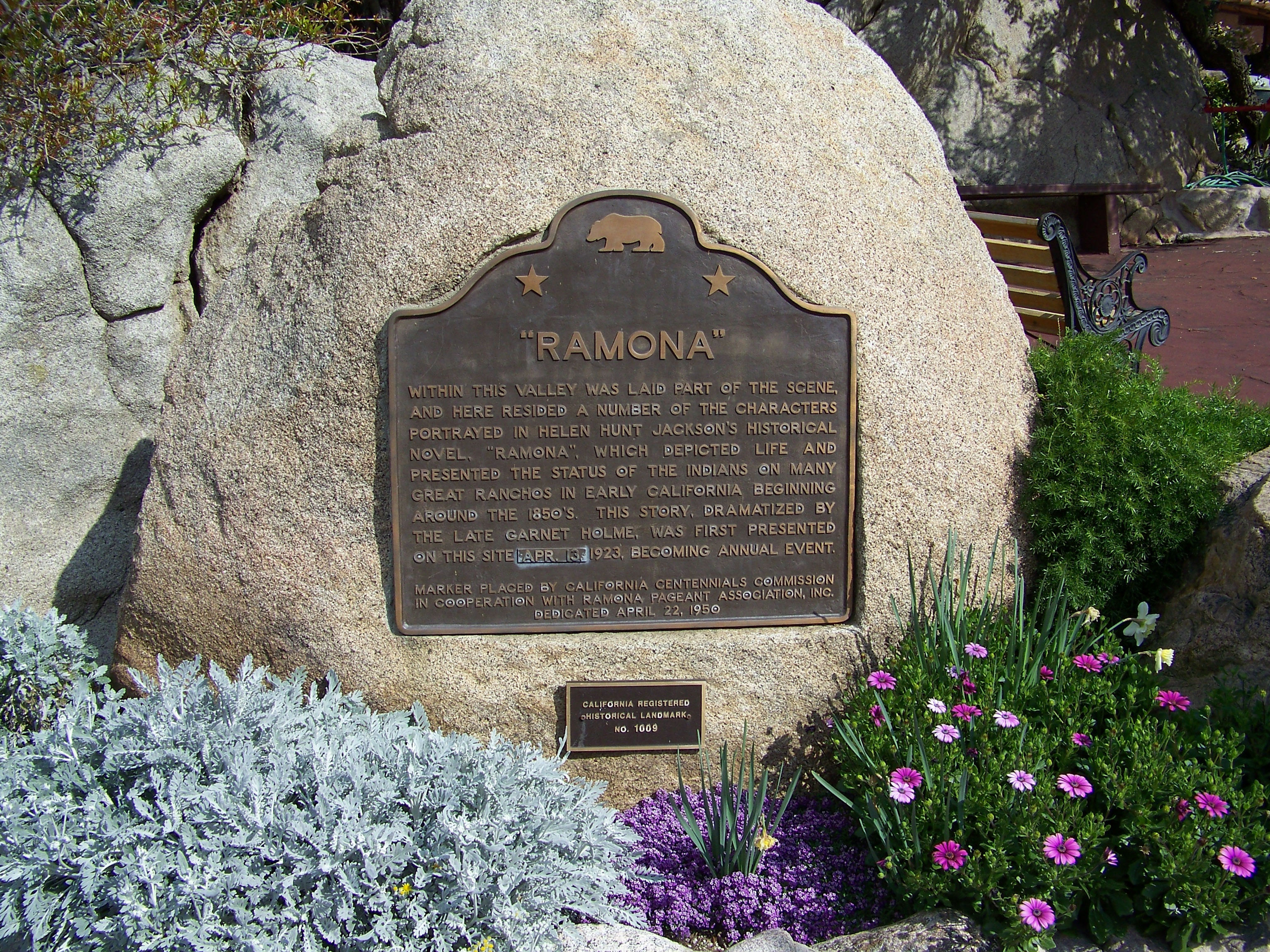
- California Landmark of Ramona in Ramona Bowl, Hemet, #1009

- Location within California
- 33°43′12″N 116°56′58″W
- Location: Ramona Bowl, 27400 S Girard Street, Hemet, California

California Historical Landmark
- Designated: February 16, 1993
- Reference no.: 1009

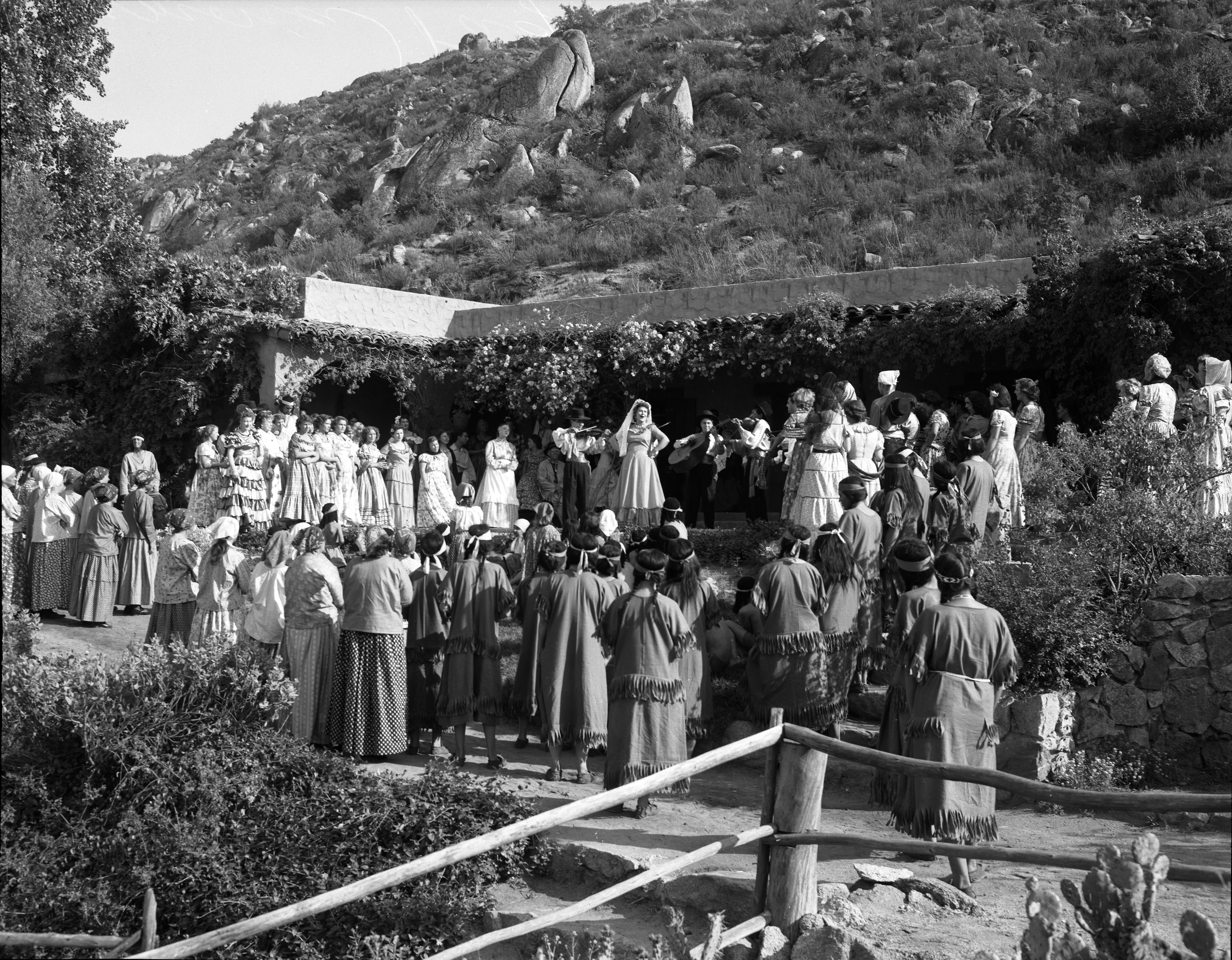
The Ramona Pageant, 1950

The Ramona Outdoor Play, formerly known as (and still commonly called) The Ramona Pageant, is an outdoor drama staged annually in Hemet, California, since 1923. It is loosely based on the 1884 novel Ramona by Helen Hunt Jackson.

== History and origination ==
The original script was written by Garnet Holme in 1923. Holme was also the original director and the person who chose the plot of land where the play is still currently set, called the Ramona Bowl. The Ramona Bowl (or The Bowl) is located in the San Jacinto Mountains, in a valley in Hemet. There is a hillside where the stage is set, as well as an audience area. In 1988, major renovations took place, in which the valley was lifted, allowing the audience to move closer to the hillside. Although at least eight other stage plays have been adapted from the novel, as of 1993 The Ramona Pageant is the only surviving version. Moreover, Holme's adaptation is the most successful and the most circulated version of the play. The play is held over three consecutive weekends in April and May in the Ramona Bowl, a natural amphitheater in the foothills above Hemet in Riverside County. In 2015, a brand new, updated script was written by international award-winning film director and screenwriter Stephen Savage, featuring much more action and historic content, while remaining far from the author’s original novel. Under the direction of Dennis Anderson, the new version enters its 7th season in 2023.

The Ramona Pageant is the longest running outdoor play in the United States, and is still going today. It ran uninterrupted except in 1933, caused by Great Depression; in 1942, when World War II occurred and in 2020 caused by COVID-19 pandemic. In 1993, it was declared California's official State Outdoor Play.

== Overview ==
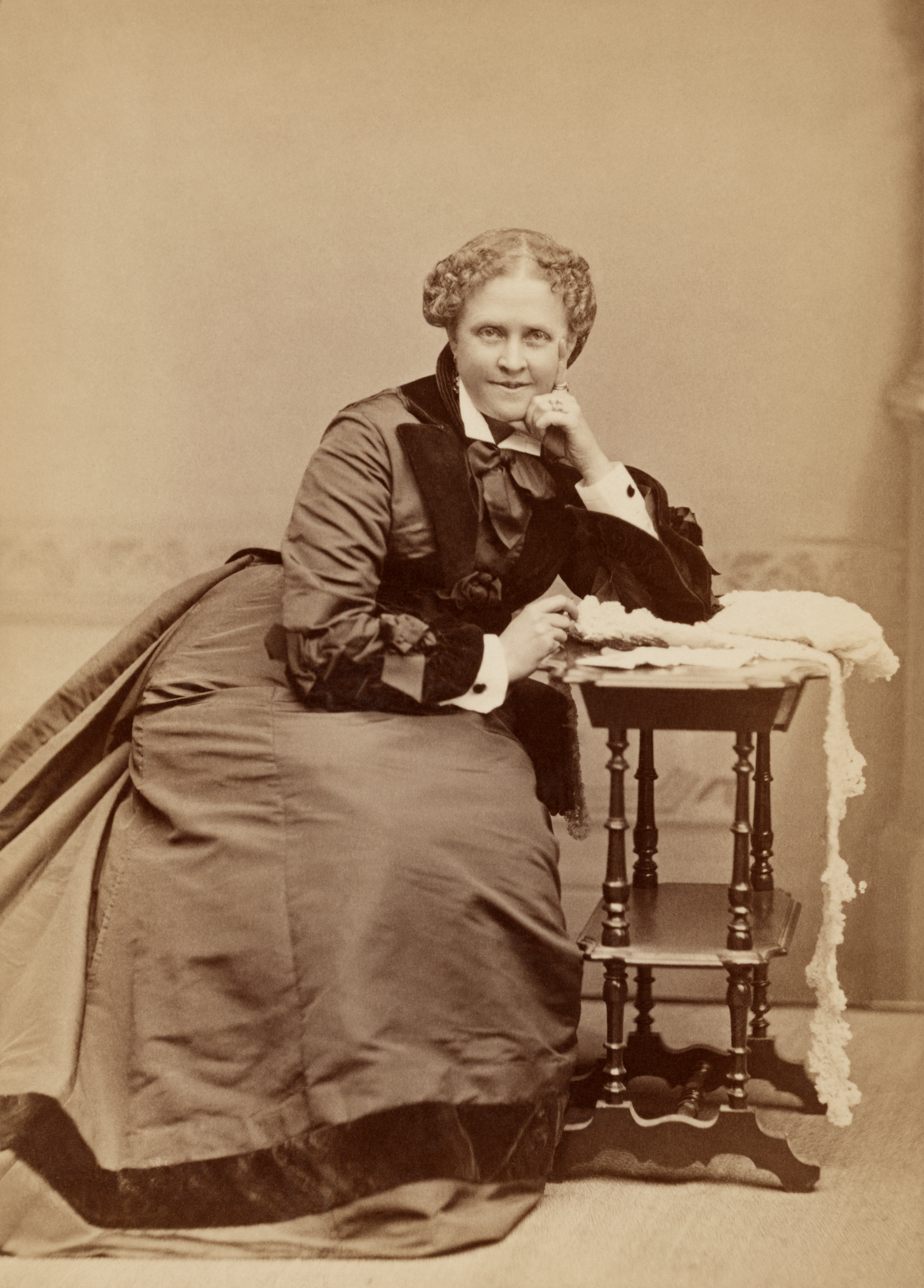
An image of Helen Hunt Jackson

The play can be considered a "Romeo and Juliet that is set in the Wild Wild West", since it resembles the story of two star-crossed lovers challenging their rivaling families in order to be together, despite the ongoing situation of white settlers taking over the native land. Ramona is an orphaned half-Native American and half-Scottish, who was adopted by Senora Moreno, a Mexican-American woman. Unfortunately, Ramona was neglected by her adopter, since she was of mixed race. When Ramona meets Alessandro, she falls in love with him. Alessandro is the son of Pablo Assis, the chief of the Temecula Indian tribe. When Senora Moreno finds out about Ramona and Alessandro, she is infuriated because she does not approve the marriage between a half-Native American and a full-Native American. When Ramona finds out that Senora Moreno never actually treated her with love and respect as a child, she runs away with Alessandro. During their elopement, they are constantly going through hardships such as having their properties stolen by immigrants and being pushed further into isolation. Soon, they conceive a child. However, Alessandro borrows a horse (without permission) when their child falls ill and is shot and killed while trying to return the horse. After Alessandro's death, Ramona returns to Senora Moreno's home and marries her son. They both have multiple children, along with Ramona's and Alessandro's first child.

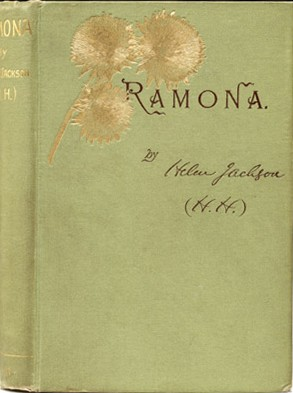
Ramona by Helen Hunt Jackson, 1884 print

== Performers ==
The production features a cast of approximately 375 members, mainly local volunteers or residents in the community. Holme says that casting local members maintained the authenticity of the roles in the play. Animals such as horses and mules are also featured in the play, as well as early California musicians, The Arias Troubadours. The Arias Troubadours have been providing the beautiful and authentic musical sound track since 1924. The Arias Troubadours were founded by Jose Arias and Antonio Corral whose descendants Carlos Corral (son), Henry Arias (grandson), Joseph Arias (grandson), John Murphy (great-grandson) and Violet Murphy (great-great-granddaughter) carry on the family legacy of cultural and traditional music. Antonio Corral's granddaughter Desiree Corral performs Spanish dances during the fiesta scene while his great granddaughter Cecilia Schneider performs the energetic and traditional jota La Madre del Cordero. The lead roles are Ramona and Alessandro, her Native American lover. In 2023, The Ramona Pageant celebrated its 100th year as American's longest running outdoor play.

=== Cast ===
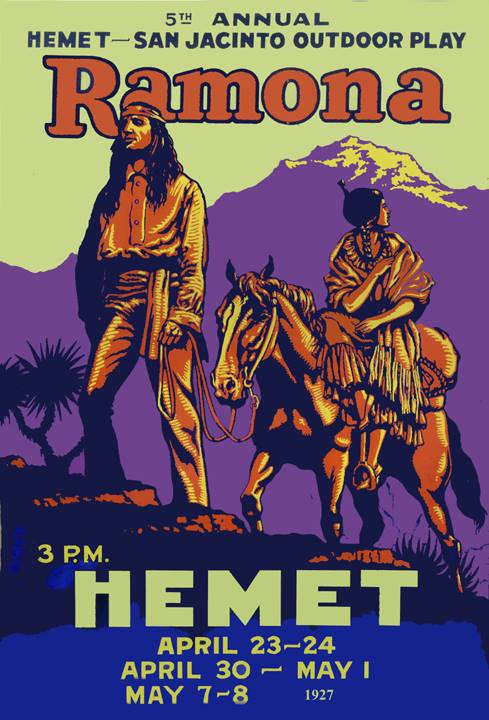
A poster advertising the fifth Ramona Pageant in 1927

- Ramona – Dorise Schukow (1923-1933), Dorothy Bailey Vosburg (1951-1961), Susan C. Hunter (1973-1976), Kathi Anderson (1985), Kayla Contreras (2016-2023)
- Alessandro – Bruce Botteler (1923-1933), Maurice Jara (1952-1966), Tom Lancaster (1982), Crist P. Thomas (1985-1986, 1989), Joseph Valdez (2015-2018) Brent Howard (1995-1996), Eli Santana (2019-current)
- Senora – Marian Carter (1983-1986, 1988-2005), Adelaide Clarke, Kathi Anderson (2014-)
- Felipe – Karyl Marker, Winston Peacock, John Murphy, Frank Jaramillo (2014), Bret Cherland (2018, 2022-), Mark Rodgers (2019)
- Juan Canito – Ed Poorman, Daniel Martinez (2004-2006, 2018-)
- Marda – Cesaria Hernandez (2018-2019), Debradawn Shockey (2022), Laura Cherland (2023)
- Father Salvierderra – Frank Felt, Jim Marbury (2014), Robert Leibovich (2018-2023)
- Luigo – Winston Peacock, Paplo Cifuentes (2018-2019), Mathew Clark (2022), Christopher Guitierrez (2023)
- Margarita – Paola Cifuentes (2018-2019), Jessie Bocuard (2022), Bella Spelman (2023)
- Aunt Ri – Monica Reichl (2018-2019), Laura Cherland (2022), Debradawn Shockey (2023)
- Joe – Rafael Wave Hernandez-Minard (2018-2019), Rey Hernanez (2022), Ben Cherland (2023)
- Father Gaspara – Jim Marbury (2014), Randy Dawkins (2018–2022), Kristofer James (2024)
- Yesidro (Ysidro) – Frank Jaramillo (2018), Raphael Ojeda (2019-)
- Jim Farrar – Dan Ferguson (2018-)

=== Notable performers ===
Occasionally, professional actors have performed in the show, often portraying the romantic leading roles.

Performers (listed alphabetically by first name) have included:

- Anne Archer as Ramona (1969)
- Francesco Sorianello/Frank Sorell as Alessandro (1967-1971, 1975–1978, 1981)
- Henry Brandon
- Jean Inness as Ramona alongside her husband, Victor Jory as Alessandro
- Tom Lancaster as Alessandro (1982)
- Jeffrey Meek
- Raquel Welch/Raquel Tejada as Ramona (1959)
- Victor Jory as Alessandro (1933-1937)
- Brent Howard as Alessandro (1995-1996)

== Influence ==
The play is strongly supported by local residents of Hemet, some spanning generations of entire families, who have had a role in the play, such as managing and leading a group of children acting as Native American kids who play on the hilltop, washing and mending the costumes that the casts wear, and applying makeup to cast members. Although the play was shortened from three hours to two and a half hours, the play's theme of tolerance and message of acceptance haven't been changed. The narrative has remained the same, maintained through the tradition of the play. Alongside The Ramona Pageant, there were also five movie adaptations, one song adaptation, and tourist attractions. The play also launched the successful careers of Anne Archer and Raquel Welch. Moreover, it gave an opportunity of exposure in which it altered the public opinions of Native American culture and the history of how they were almost decimated as the country moved forward, advancing in technology and urbanization. The romanticizing of 1850s Southern California also signified the historical heritage and the lifestyle of the indigenous people before industrialization and modernization.

== California Historical Landmarks ==
A marker at the site reads:

- Within this valley was laid part of the scene, and here resided a number of the characters portrayed in Helen Hunt Jackson's historical novel, "Ramona", which depicted life and presented the status of the Indians of many great ranchos in early California beginning around the 1850s. This story, dramatized by the late Garnet Holme, was first presented on this site Apr. 13 1923, becoming annual event. Erected 1950 by California Centennials Commission in cooperation with Ramona Pageant Association, Inc. (Marker Number 1009.)

Another nearby marker reads:

- Pochea was one of cluster of Indian villages forming the very large settlement of Pahsitna which extended along the ridge east and west of Ramona Bowl. Pahsitnah was thriving when the Spanish first passed by in 1774. A tragic story tells of the natives contracting smallpox from Europeans; a terrible epidemic spreading, and some survivors fleeing to the area of the present Soboba Reservation. Erected 1983 by State Department of Parks and Recreation, San Jacinto Valley Museum, Hemet Area Museum Assoc., Ramona Pageant Assoc. Billy Holcomb Chapter No. 1069, E Clampus Vitus/Second Marker by D.A.R. (Marker Number 104.)

== See also ==
- Long-running plays (non-musicals)
