= Outdoor drama =

The outdoor drama, also known as the symphonic outdoor drama or symphonic drama, is a kind of historical play, often featuring music and dance, staged in an outdoor amphitheater in the location it depicts.

== History ==
Outdoor dramas exist in the tradition of historical pageants performed in Europe in the Middle Ages. The best known example of a religious pageant in this style is the Oberammergau Passion Play, performed in Oberammergau, Germany since 1643. Many spectacular outdoor stage events became popular in the United States in the late 19th and early 20th centuries. These pageants were not narrative dramas in the traditional sense, but they showed a series of scenes in which historical events followed one another.

The pageants leading up to the 1937 production of The Lost Colony were influenced by the event at Oberammergau. People in eastern North Carolina were encouraged to share the history of the lost colony of Roanoke — which had been largely forgotten. The residents of Roanoke Island sought to share the story with the world by staging a pageant.

Southern playwright and Lost Colony author Paul Green had a lifelong fascination with theatrical elements such as dance, language, music, and lighting, and a desire for drama to make a difference in American social life. Green was deeply influenced by Frederick Koch, a professor at the University of North Carolina at Chapel Hill, who had developed ideas about “folk drama” and a concern for ordinary people and their experiences. He was also a close collaborator with the musician Lamar Stringfield who published a book of arrangements of Appalachian folk songs with Bascom Lamar Lunsford in 1929 and founded the Institute of Folk Music at the University of North Carolina at Chapel Hill in 1930. Stringfield provided the original music for the Lost Colony.

"By 'people's theatre', I mean theatre in which plays are written, acted and produced for and by the people for their enjoyment and enrichment and not for any special monetary profit."

Pulitzer Prize winner Paul Green wrote those words about The Lost Colony in 1938, a year after its debut. By then, America's first outdoor symphonic drama was a critical and popular success, proof that "people's theatre" could work.

The Lost Colony was presented with a Tony Award in 2013, recognizing the enduring appeal of the form.

Other notable outdoor dramas include The Ramona Pageant, running since 1923, Unto These Hills, running since 1950, and Horn in the West, running since 1952.
