= North Carolina Symphony =

Orchestra based in Raleigh, North Carolina

- Orchestra
- Founded: 1932
- Location: Raleigh, North Carolina
- Concert hall: Meymandi Concert Hall
- Principal conductor: Carlos Miguel Prieto
- Website: www.ncsymphony.org

The North Carolina Symphony is an American orchestra based in Raleigh, North Carolina, with sixty-six full-time musicians. The orchestra performs in Meymandi Concert Hall and performs occasionally with the Carolina Ballet and the Opera Company of North Carolina. In 2017–18, the organization celebrated its 85th anniversary season. Concert series are also performed across North Carolina in the cities of Chapel Hill, Cary, Southern Pines, New Bern, Wilmington, and Fayetteville, among others.

== History ==
In 1932, Lamar Stringfield united a group of volunteers to form the North Carolina Symphony. They first performed in Hill Hall at the University of North Carolina Chapel Hill in North Carolina on May 14, 1932. The original musicians of the symphony were unpaid local musicians. By 1935, the North Carolina Symphony had performed in more than fifty cities and towns in North Carolina, in over 140 concerts. Dr. Benjamin Swalin, music director from 1939 to 1972, continued the orchestra's mission to reach as many North Carolina natives as possible.

In the 1940s, the North Carolina Symphony became the first orchestra to receive continuous state funding. The "Horn Tootin’ Bill", which asserted that state funds would be given to orchestras, was passed by the North Carolina State Legislature in March 1943. First Lady of North Carolina Alice Willson Broughton helped lobby for the legislation. The North Carolina Symphony continues to receive this state funding today. In 1942, the symphony began to focus on education, bringing in young children and students into the concert hall to ask questions and hear the musicians play. The symphony began coordinating with elementary schools, exposing many children to symphonic music at an early age.

In 1961 Governor Terry Sanford and First Lady Margaret Rose Sanford hosted the first annual North Carolina Symphony Ball, which serves as a fundraiser for the symphony.

The North Carolina Symphony is an orchestra with a reputation for playing many genres and types of music outside of classical concerts. In 2007, the symphony toured western North Carolina, with a program featuring traditional North Carolina folk music; Cherokee flutist, fiddlers, banjo players, and clogging performed with the symphony.

From 2004 to 2020, Grant Llewellyn was orchestra's music director. His initial contract was for four years, and in November 2006, his contract was extended to 2012. In 2013, Llewellyn's contract was extended through 2018. Llewellyn stepped down as music director during the pandemic-curtailed 2019-20 season but retains the title of music director laureate. In June 2021, the orchestra announced that Mexican conductor Carlos Miguel Prieto will serve as artistic advisor for the orchestra's 2021–22 season. On February 23, 2022, the North Carolina Symphony announced the appointment of Prieto as its next music director. His initial four-year term as music director began with the 2023–2024 season, and he served as music director designate during the 2022–2023 season.

In 2021, Michelle Di Russo joined the North Carolina Symphony as an assistant conductor, and in 2022, she was promoted to the role of associate conductor.

== Activities ==
The orchestra has released several albums, such as Britten's Cello Symphony and Sonata with cellist Zuill Bailey, which debuted at #1 on the Billboard Traditional Classical chart.

David Hartman, the host of the ABC television program Good Morning America, is the host for the North Carolina Symphony radio broadcasts.

As part of the orchestra's education program, around 50 of the orchestra's 200 annual performances during the year are devoted to students. To engage young people's interest in orchestral instruments, they include an "Instrument Zoo," where children have a hands-on opportunity to try various instruments. In addition, the orchestra holds a Youth Concerto Competition, sponsors the Triangle Youth Philharmonic, and invites students to observe rehearsals.

== Music directors ==
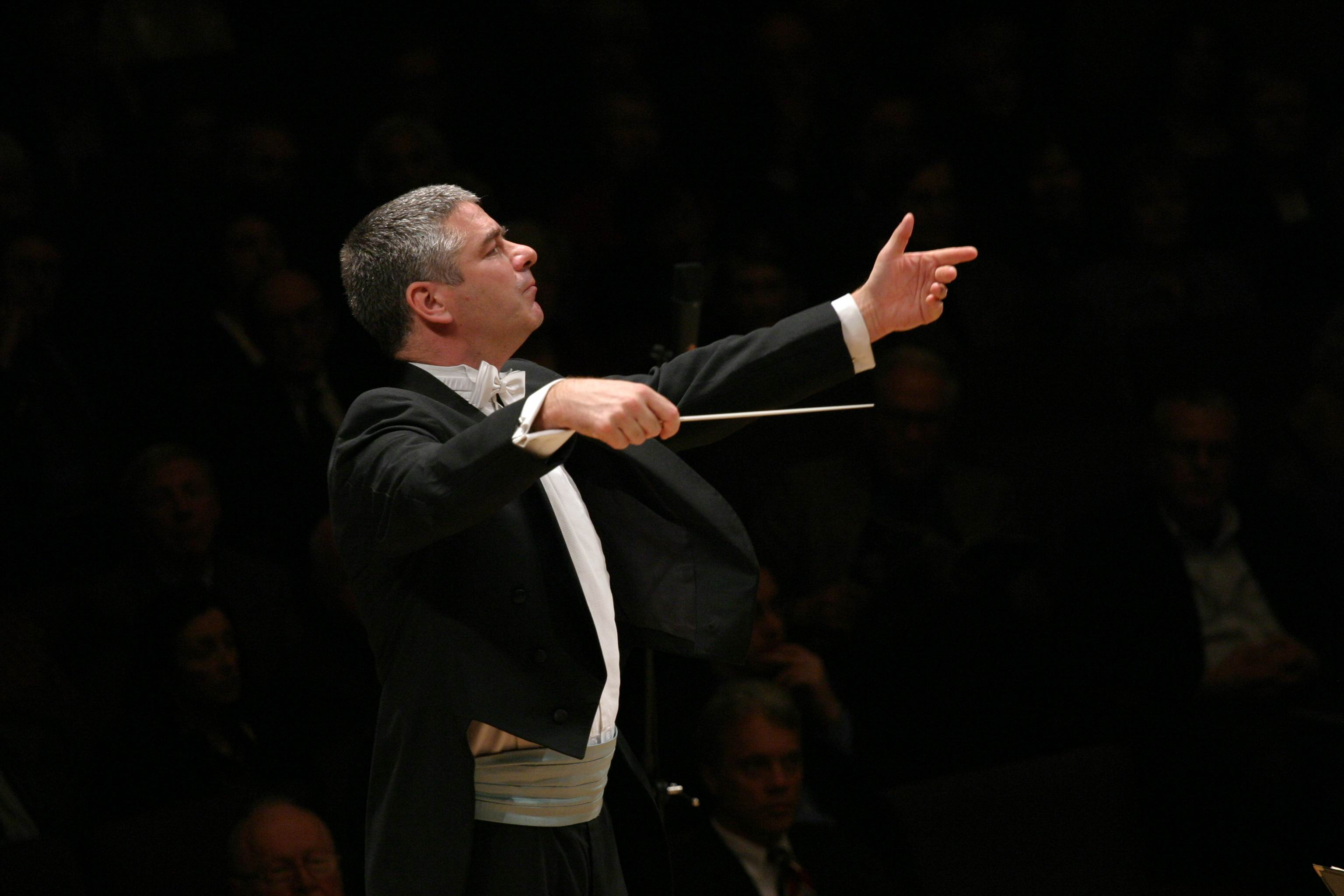
Grant Llewellyn, Music Director

- 1932–1938 Lamar Stringfield
- 1939–1972 Benjamin Swalin
- 1972–1980 John Gosling
- 1982–2003 Gerhardt Zimmermann
- 2004–2020 Grant Llewellyn
- 2022–present Carlos Miguel Prieto
