= 21st Tony Awards =

1967 US theatrical awards ceremony

- Date: March 26, 1967
- Location: Shubert Theatre, New York City, New York
- Hosted by: Mary Martin and Robert Preston
- Most wins: Cabaret (8)
- Most nominations: Cabaret (11)

Television/radio coverage
- Network: ABC

The 21st Annual Tony Awards ceremony was broadcast on March 26, 1967, from the Shubert Theatre in New York City on the ABC Television network. This was the Awards ceremony's inaugural broadcast on U.S. network television. The hosts were Mary Martin and Robert Preston. This year marked the first joint presentation of the awards by the American Theatre Wing with The Broadway League (formerly The League of American Theatres and Producers).

== Eligibility ==
Shows that opened on Broadway during the 1966–1967 season before February 20, 1967 are eligible.

Original plays

- Agatha Sue, I Love You
- The Astrakhan Coat
- Black Comedy
- Come Live with Me
- A Delicate Balance
- Don't Drink the Water
- The East Wind
- Hail Scrawdyke!
- Help Stamp Out Marriage!
- The Homecoming
- How's the World Treating You?
- The Investigation
- The Killing of Sister George
- Love in E-Flat
- The Loves of Cass McGuire
- Of Love Remembered
- The Paisley Convertible
- The Star-Spangled Girl
- My Sweet Charlie
- Those That Play the Clowns
- Under the Weather
- We, Comrades Three
- We Have Always Lived in the Castle
- White Lies
- Yerma

Original musicals

- The Apple Tree
- At the Drop of Another Hat
- Cabaret
- A Hand Is on the Gate
- I Do! I Do!
- A Joyful Noise
- Let's Sing Yiddish
- Walking Happy

Play revivals

- The Alchemist
- Dinner at Eight
- Marat/Sade
- Right You Are (If You Think You Are)
- The Rose Tattoo
- The School for Scandal
- The Wild Duck
- You Can't Take It with You

Musical revivals

- Annie Get Your Gun
- The Threepenny Opera

== The ceremony ==
Presenters were: Lauren Bacall, Harry Belafonte, Carol Burnett, Marge and Gower Champion, Kirk Douglas, John Forsythe, Jill Haworth, Angela Lansbury, Mayor John V. Lindsay, David Merrick, Zero Mostel, Lynn Redgrave, Lee Remick and Barbra Streisand.

The ceremony featured performances from the following musicals:

- Cabaret ("Wilkommen" – Joel Grey and Company)
- The Apple Tree ("Movie Star"/"Gorgeous" – Barbara Harris and Larry Blyden)
- I Do! I Do! ("Nobody's Perfect" – Mary Martin and Robert Preston)
- Walking Happy ("Walking Happy" – Norman Wisdom and Company)

== Award winners and nominees ==
Winners are in bold

Best Play	Best Musical
**The Homecoming – Harold Pinter**; A Delicate Balance – Edward Albee; Black Comedy – Peter Shaffer; The Killing of Sister George – Frank Marcus	**Cabaret**; I Do! I Do!; The Apple Tree; Walking Happy
Best Performance by a Leading Actor in a Play	Best Performance by a Leading Actress in a Play
**Paul Rogers – The Homecoming as Max**; Hume Cronyn – A Delicate Balance as Tobias; Donald Madden – Black Comedy as Harold Gorringe; Donald Moffat – Right You Are (If You Think You Are) as Laudisi, and as Hjalmar Ekdal in “The Wild Duck”	**Beryl Reid – The Killing of Sister George as Sister George/June Buckridge**; Eileen Atkins – The Killing of Sister George as Childie/Alice McNaught; Vivien Merchant – The Homecoming as Ruth; Rosemary Murphy – A Delicate Balance as Claire
Best Performance by a Leading Actor in a Musical	Best Performance by a Leading Actress in a Musical
**Robert Preston – I Do! I Do! as Michael**; Alan Alda – The Apple Tree as Various Characters; Jack Gilford – Cabaret as Herr Schultz; Norman Wisdom – Walking Happy as Will Mossop	**Barbara Harris – The Apple Tree as Various Characters**; Lotte Lenya – Cabaret as Fraulein Schneider; Mary Martin – I Do! I Do! as She (Agnes); Louise Troy – Walking Happy as Maggie Hobson
Best Performance by a Supporting or Featured Actor in a Play	Best Performance by a Supporting or Featured Actress in a Play
**Ian Holm – The Homecoming as Lenny**; Clayton Corzatte – The School for Scandal as Charles Surface; Stephen Elliot – Marat/Sade as Mr. Coulmier; Sydney Walker – The Wild Duck as Lt. Ekdal	**Marian Seldes – A Delicate Balance as Julia**; Camila Ashland – Black Comedy as Miss Furnival; Brenda Forbes – The Loves of Cass McGuire as Trilbe Costello; Maria Tucci – The Rose Tattoo as Rosa Delle Rose
Best Performance by a Supporting or Featured Actor in a Musical	Best Performance by a Supporting or Featured Actress in a Musical
**Joel Grey – Cabaret as the Master of Ceremonies**; Leon Bibb – A Hand Is on the Gate as Performer; Gordon Dilworth – Walking Happy as Tubby Wadlow; Edward Winter – Cabaret as Ernst Ludwig	**Peg Murray – Cabaret as Fraulein Kost**; Leland Palmer – A Joyful Noise as Miss Jimmie; Josephine Premice – A Hand Is on the Gate as Various Characters; Susan Watson – A Joyful Noise as Jenny Lee
Best Direction of a Play	Best Direction of a Musical
**Peter Hall – The Homecoming**; John Dexter – Black Comedy; Donald Driver – Marat/Sade; Alan Schneider – A Delicate Balance	**Harold Prince – Cabaret**; Gower Champion – I Do! I Do!; Mike Nichols – The Apple Tree; Jack Sydow – Annie Get Your Gun
Best Original Score (Music and/or Lyrics) Written for the Theatre	Best Choreography
**Cabaret – John Kander (music) and Fred Ebb (lyrics)**; The Apple Tree – Jerry Bock (music) and Sheldon Harnick (lyrics); Walking Happy – Jimmy Van Heusen (music) and Sammy Cahn (lyrics); I Do! I Do! – Harvey Schmidt (music) and Tom Jones (lyrics)	**Ron Field – Cabaret**; Michael Bennett – A Joyful Noise; Danny Daniels – Walking Happy and Annie Get Your Gun; Lee Theodore – The Apple Tree
Best Scenic Design	Best Costume Design
**Boris Aronson – Cabaret**; John Bury – The Homecoming; Oliver Smith – I Do! I Do!; Alan Tagg – Black Comedy	**Patricia Zipprodt – Cabaret**; Nancy Potts – The Wild Duck and The School for Scandal; Tony Walton – The Apple Tree; Freddy Wittop – I Do! I Do!

=== Multiple nominations and awards ===
These productions had multiple nominations:

- 11 nominations: Cabaret
- 7 nominations: The Apple Tree and I Do! I Do!
- 6 nominations: The Homecoming and Walking Happy
- 5 nominations: Black Comedy and A Delicate Balance
- 3 nominations: A Joyful Noise, The Killing of Sister George and The Wild Duck
- 2 nominations: Annie Get Your Gun, A Hand Is on the Gate, Marat/Sade and The School for Scandal

The following productions received multiple awards.

- 8 wins: Cabaret
- 4 wins: The Homecoming

== See also ==
- 39th Academy Awards
