= Catherine Russell (American actress) =

American actress, producer and educator

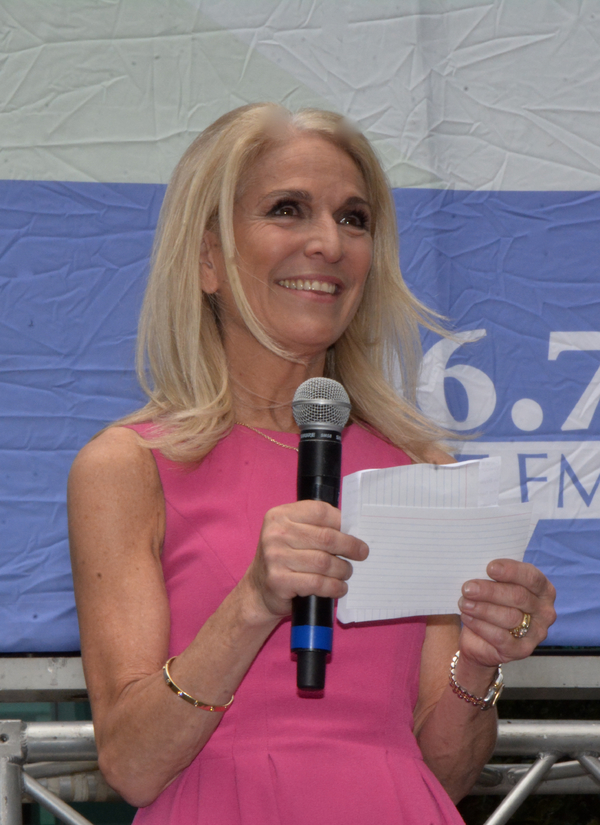
- Catherine Russell at the 2016 Broadway in Bryant Park
- Born: 1956 (age 69–70)
- Education: Cornell University (AB); New York University (MA)
- Occupations: Actor; Producer; Professor; General Manager
- Years active: 1980–present

Catherine Russell (born 1956) is an American stage actress, professor, general manager, and producer, known for her role as Margaret Thorne Brent in the late Warren Manzi's Off-Broadway play Perfect Crime, which opened in 1987. Russell has not taken a sick day since the play's opening and holds the world record for the most performances as the same character in a play.

== Biography ==
Russell grew up in New Canaan, Connecticut. In 1970, at the age of 14, Russell appeared in The Diary of Anne Frank.

She earned her Bachelor of Arts at Cornell University in 1977 and an MA from New York University in 1980.

=== Theater ===
Russell made her Off-Broadway debut in 1980 as Nicola Davies in Stephen Poliakoff's City Sugar. She has since appeared Off-Broadway in productions such as Miss Shumann's Quartet, A Resounding Twinkle, The Award And Other Plays and Creeps.

Russell has played the character of Margaret Thorne Brent in the late Warren Manzi's Off-Broadway play Perfect Crime since its opening in 1987. She has missed only four performances, the last in 1995 to attend her brother's wedding. In 2008, Russell was awarded the Guinness World Record for most performances as the same character. She celebrated her 15,000th performance in that role in December 2024.

Russell's understudy was Andrea Leigh, who also served as assistant stage manager on the production.

Russell is the general manager of The Theater Center, which she built in 2005. There she was a lead producer of The Fantasticks from 2006 to 2017.

=== Teaching ===
Russell teaches educational theater as an adjunct faculty member at NYU Steinhardt since 1981 and has taught writing at Baruch College since 1980.

== Personal life ==
Russell was married to Patrick Robustelli, who owned the Times Square pizzeria, Patzeria, until his death in 2019. She identifies as a Christian Scientist.
