= A Family Affair (musical) =

1962 musical by James and William Goldman, John Kander

- Original Cast Recording
- Music: John Kander
- Lyrics: James Goldman; John Kander
- Book: James Goldman; William Goldman
- Productions: 1962 Broadway

A Family Affair is a musical with a book by James Goldman and William Goldman, lyrics by James Goldman and John Kander, and music by Kander. This was Kander's first show and his only one written without Fred Ebb in Ebb's lifetime.

== Synopsis ==
In Chicago, Gerry Siegal and Sally Nathan, a young suburban Chicago couple, decide to marry.

The bride's Uncle Alfie (her guardian) wants an intimate wedding and wages a war of words with the groom's entire family. The groom's brassy Jewish mother Tillie commandeers the planning, steering it towards a large country club wedding (despite her husband's scolding her for taking over). Caterers, dressmakers, band leaders, rabbis, florists, photographers and a bossy wedding planner are pushed to the limit by the madcap preparations.

The bride and groom, who have retained their sanity, realize that their families have almost destroyed the wedding. They announce their intention to have a quiet family affair.

== Song list ==
Act I

- Anything for You
- Beautiful
- My Son, the Lawyer
- Every Girl Wants to Get Married
- Right Girls
- Kalua Bay
- There's a Room in My House
- Siegal Marching Song
- Nathan Marching Song
- Harmony

Act II

- Now, Morris
- Wonderful Party
- Revenge
- Summer is Over
- Harmony (Reprise)
- I'm Worse Than Anybody
- What I Say Goes
- The Wedding

== Background ==
The three collaborators on the show, William and James Goldman, and John Kander, had all been friends for a long time and shared an apartment in New York City. Although all three would enjoy great success, when the musical was written only William Goldman was doing well in his career. He later remembered:

They were older than I was, Kander and my brother, and they were the ones who were supposed to succeed and they weren't I was. It terrified me and I wrote a musical with my brother and Kander, A Family Affair, which got on, which failed. I don't know why I did it. Here were these two wonderful figures for me and I was doing well and they weren't and I helped them in my own nutty way. Except it didn't work out that way, since everything I tried for the theatre failed.

William Goldman says the idea for the musical was his.

The musical was originally optioned by Leland Hayward and when he dropped the option their agent, Richard Seff, talked his cousin Andrew into producing it. Seff recalled: “Jerome Robbins was interested in directing, which made Leland Hayward interested in producing — but when Robbins decided that he wouldn’t, Hayward said he wouldn’t, either. But I so believed in this show that I got my cousin Andrew... to produce it.” Money was raised by doing live auditions, according to Seff:

Jim couldn't sing a note, Bill can't really sing but John Kander can a little bit, so Kander would play and sing and Bill would sing with him and then I had to get up and sing with them too so here was the agent playing actor. There were thirty people, fifty people, and we'd raise the thousand dollars one night and two thousand the next and we put together the whole show that way.

The credits are shared by all three equally. "I would not say I was a major contributor to the lyrics, but we all decided the three of us would take the billing," remembers William Goldman.

== Production history ==
Hal Prince, a producer who was looking to direct, had read the musical on the recommendation of Stephen Sondheim while working on Tenderloin. He later recalled "The book was funny and the score superior. Though there were sufficient conflicts en route to the altar, there was also a certain predictability about them, and never a doubt where the show was going. For this reason I did not want to do it."

The director eventually hired was Word Baker, who recently had staged The Fantasticks off-Broadway. The cast was headed by Shelley Berman, Morris Carnovsky, and Eileen Heckart. Prince recalled "Berman was in his prime then, but was cast in a subordinate role, the uncle of the bride, unbalancing the project. His was the best material, most flamboyant characterization."

A Family Affair opened in Philadelphia but reviews and audiences were poor. Variety said "in the second act virtually all the ensembles fail to jell."

Prince says the show "was on the verge of closing without moving to New York." Jerome Robbins, George Abbott and Gower Champion were approached to take over as director but turned it down. "Failing with every musical director in New York, they invited me," wrote Prince.

Prince went to see the show in Philadelphia:

It was a mess. The material that I liked so much on paper was impossible to see for the production that was imposed on it, a unit set that looked like a tiered wedding cake... Instead of a realistic old-fashioned musical with walls, and doors, and corners, they had gone chic with yards and yards of China silk and surrealistic costumes. It had a big chorus it didn’t need. It was a disaster. Still, I remembered the material and if you could simply put back on the stage what I’d read, in focus so we could see it, that alone would have to make an enormous difference.

There was no money to continue the show in Philadelphia. Prince offered to take over direction and help the show open in New York provided he had complete creative control. He says of the three stars, Eileen Heckart was the one who wanted the show to end but she was outvoted. That night Prince developed a new scene with the authors which Berman refused to do, but Prince held his ground; the scene was rehearsed, went well, and Berman apologised. "In a week’s time we substituted eighty new pages for the hundred and ten which comprised the book, and moved on to New York," wrote Prince.

Prince says his mentor George Abbott gave his blessing but warned the new director that "No doubt I would do good work, the improvements would be real, but I must be careful not to be seduced by the experience into wishful-thinking a success, because that would turn an otherwise marvelous experience into a disappointment. Well, I was seduced, and it was disappointing."

The Broadway production of Family Affair opened on January 27, 1962, at the Billy Rose Theatre, where it ran for 65 performances and five previews. It lost $420,000 on an original investment of $350,000.

According to Richard Seff:

We kept it alive, barely. It earned a living for those nine weeks but it never made any profit to speak of and to go on longer would have meant to take big losses so it was sensible to close it... When we first heard it, we thought it had great charm. But I think it would have been helped by a director who really understood big musicals and Wood Baker had just had the great success with Fantastiks, which was only a few people in a tiny, tiny theatre, and he did that one imaginatively, but this one he did not do imaginatively and it was very clunky. A lot depends on the director in a musical. He really can make fair material much better and a bad director can take excellent material and make it worse... Hal Prince took over the direction out of town. He helped it a lot. It got better. It just didn't get good enough.

Prince later reflected, "We could not have accomplished what we had in ten days were it not for Baker’s initial direction. The performers knew who they were.... But Baker was married to the wrong material. He has a natural sense of fantasy, a light touch, but here he was working with a Jewish family comedy."

A number of record companies turned down the chance to record an original cast album, including Columbia and RCA. “I made it my mission to get it recorded,” said Seff. “I finally convinced United Artists to do it.” It was the first time they had recorded an original cast album.

== Reception ==
Howard Taubmann of the New York Times said "the writing of A Family Affair is not strong on taste; it resorts to the cliches of Jewish domestic attitudes. Nor is it fresh in style; it often has the air of a busy, good-humored borrower from various musical-comedy sources. Since some of these sources are first-rate, some numbers are lively."

Walter Kerr liked much of the show but felt "it falls off in the vacuousness of some of its blackouts, falls off in the repetitiousness of quarrels that don’t progress, falls off most notoriously in its second-act reaching for incidental numbers (such as a bachelor party) that are far enough afield to be arrested for vagrancy. ... A most appealing “almost"."

Kander and Ebb's biographer later wrote the musical "has some screamingly funny scenes and a solid if conventional musical comedy score, but today it seems a bit too much like a glorified Catskill comedy skit."

== Legacy ==
One of the songs from the musical that was dropped, "Mamie in the Afternoon", was rewritten by Kander as "Arthur in the Afternoon" and put in The Act.

Prince later wrote "there are many reasons why I’m glad I directed A Family Affair," including it being his first collaboration with a number of people whom he would work with again, such as John Kander, James Goldman and Linda Lavin.

Heckart's son said the ultimately unsuccessful experience soured Heckart on pursuing any more musicals, and including a subsequent offer to appear in Company. However, she was proud of the fact she was featured on the cast album, and asked for her song in A Family Affair "My Son the Lawyer" to be played at her funeral.

== Original cast ==
- Shelley Berman as Alfie
- Eileen Heckart as Tillie
- Rita Gardner as Sally
- Larry Kert as Gerry
- Morris Carnovsky
- Cathryn Damon
- Bibi Osterwald
- Linda Lavin

== Notes ==
- Not Since Carrie: Forty Years of Broadway Musical Flops by Ken Mandelbaum, published by St. Martin's Press (1991), pages 141–42 (ISBN 0-312-06428-4)
- A Family Affair at the Music Theatre International Website
- Egan, Sean, William Goldman: The Reluctant Storyteller, Bear Manor Media 2014
- Prince, Hal (1974). Contradictions : notes on twenty-six years in the theatre.
- Filichia, Peter (2010). Broadway musicals : the biggest hit and the biggest flop of the season, 1959 to 2009.
- Ilson, Carol (1989). Harold Prince : from Pajama game to Phantom of the opera.
- Leve, James (2009). Kander and Ebb.
