= Rita Gardner =

American actress and singer (1934–2022)

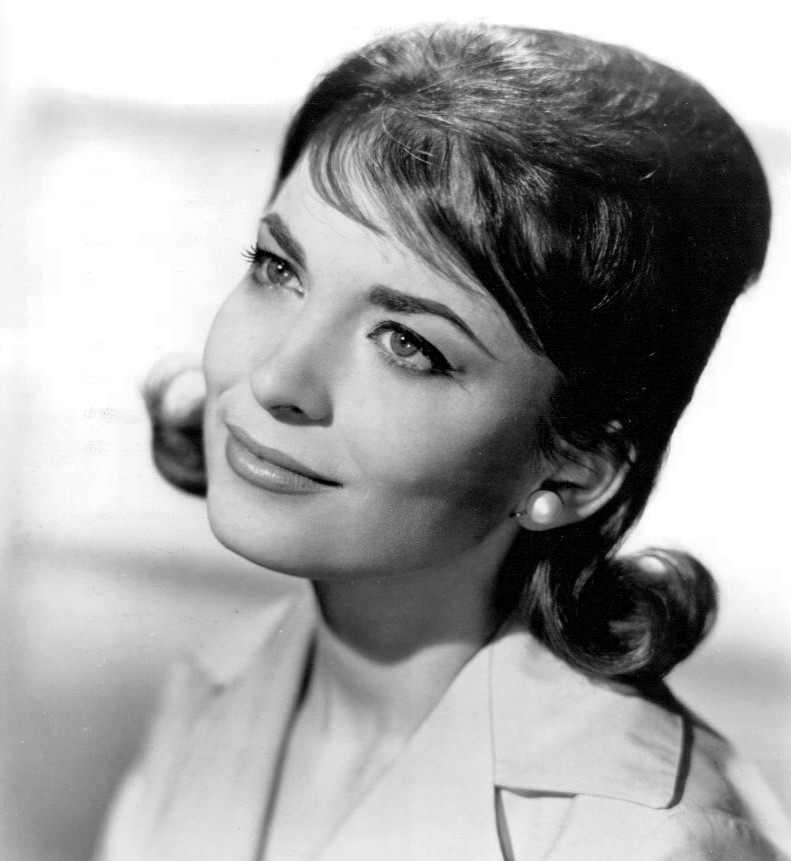
- Gardner in 1966
- Born: Rita Schier; October 23, 1934; New York City, U.S.
- Died: September 24, 2022 (aged 87); New York City, U.S.
- Occupation: Actress · singer
- Years active: 1958–2020
- Spouses: Herb Gardner (m. 1957; div. 1970) Peter Cereghetti (divorced): Robert Sevra (?-2022; her death)
- Website: ritagardner.com

Rita Gardner (née Schier; October 23, 1934 – September 24, 2022) was an American actress and singer.

== Career ==
Gardner made her stage debut Off-Broadway in Jerry Herman's musical review Nightcap (1958) before her breakout turn as Luisa in the original cast of The Fantasticks in 1960. Other off-Broadway credits include The Cradle Will Rock (1964), To Be Young, Gifted, and Black (1969), Jacques Brel is Alive and Well and Living in Paris (1972), Steel Magnolias (1987), Wings (1993), and The Foreigner (2004).

Gardner made her Broadway debut in the short-lived musical (65 performances) A Family Affair in 1962 as Sally Nathan. She was featured in a brief 1963 revival of Pal Joey as Linda English and replaced Susan Watson soon after the opening of Ben Franklin in Paris in 1964. Her Broadway career subsequently stalled, finding her serving as a standby or understudy in On a Clear Day You Can See Forever (1965), The Last of the Red Hot Lovers (1969), and Morning's at Seven (2002) (understudy for Cora and Esther). She had a featured role as Rosie in The Wedding Singer in 2006, with three musical numbers including the song "Move that Thang".

Gardner's regional theatre credits include Show Boat and The Impossible Years at the Bucks County Playhouse in New Hope, Pennsylvania (1983), Amanda Wingfield in The Glass Menagerie at the New Mexico Repertory Theatre (1992), the musical Lucky in the Rain at the Goodspeed Opera House (1997), and Eleanor: A Love Story at Ford's Theatre in Washington, D.C. (1999). She appeared in the national tour of Kiss of the Spider Woman (1994). She gave a critically acclaimed performance in Murderers at The Cincinnati Playhouse (2007).

In 2002, she appeared in her one-woman revue Try to Remember: A Look Back at Off-Broadway at the Sullivan Street Playhouse in New York City on Saturday evenings. The revue included ballads from The Fantasticks. She performed the revue at the Metropolitan Room in New York City in 2011.

Gardner's television credits include appearances in Law & Order, Law & Order: Special Victims Unit (on season one episode 18), Law & Order: Criminal Intent, and Dora the Explorer (as Grandma Fox).

Gardner studied acting at HB Studio in New York City. She was a faculty member for the sixth annual Cabaret Conference at Yale University in 2008.

== Personal life and death ==
Born in New York City, Rita Schier was the daughter of Nathan and Tillie (née Hack) Schier. She had an elder brother, Lewis.

Gardner married playwright Herb Gardner in 1957; the marriage ended in divorce in 1970. That same year, she remarried, to Peter Cereghetti, and then divorced not long after. Her last marriage was to playwright Robert Sevra, who survived her.

Gardner died of leukemia on September 24, 2022, in New York City, at the age of 87.
