= Lore Noto =

Broadway theatrical producer

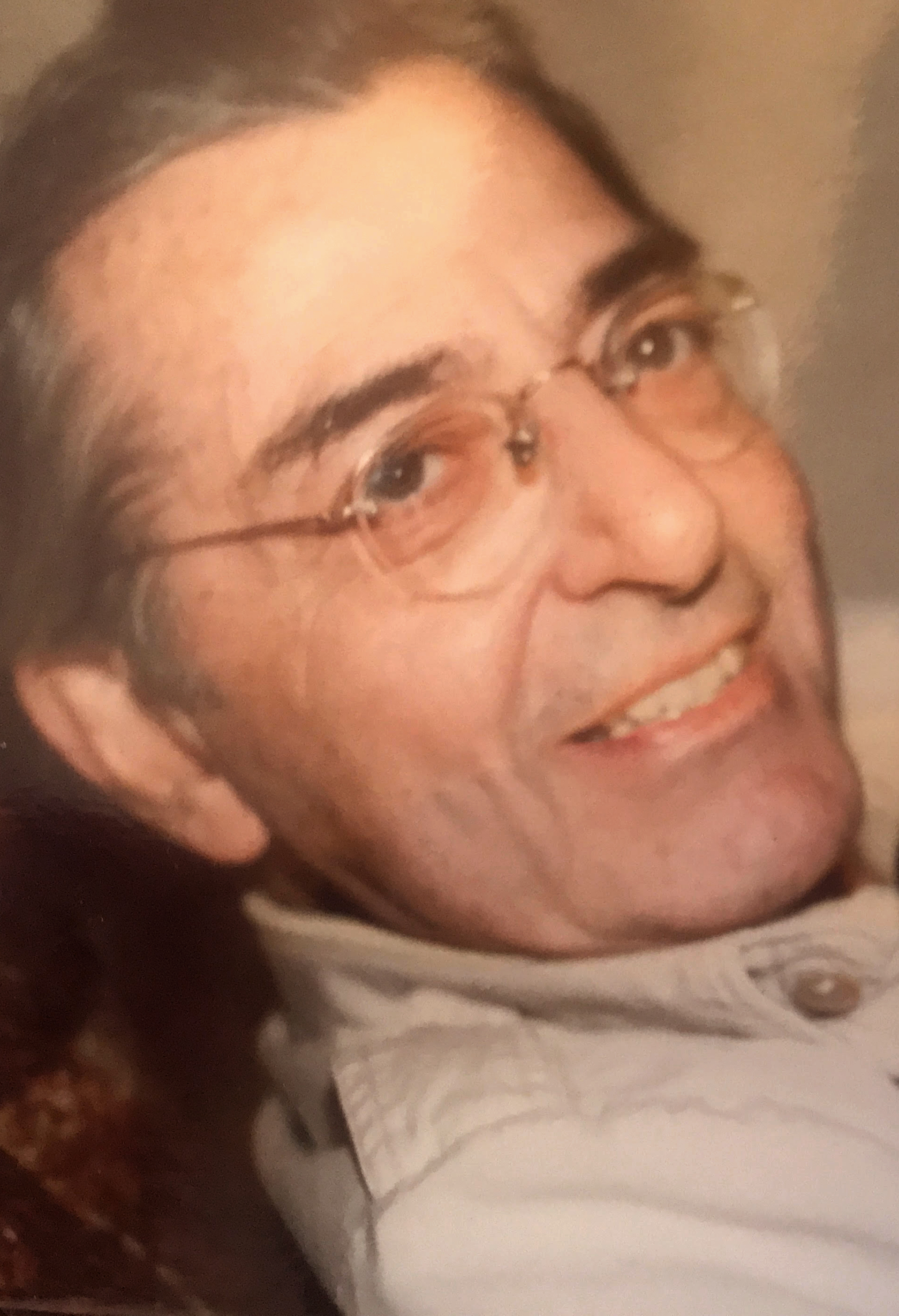
- Born: June 9, 1923; New York City, USA.
- Died: July 8, 2002 (aged 79)
- Occupations: Theatrical producer and actor
- Years active: 1939–2002

Lore Noto (June 9, 1923 – July 8, 2002), born Lorenzo Noto, was an American theatrical producer, playwright and actor, best known as the producer of the longest-running musical in history, The Fantasticks, which he produced for more than 40 years off-Broadway. He was also known for writing and producing the 1965 musical adaptation of The Yearling on Broadway.

== Early life and military career ==
Noto, born in 1923, lived as a young child in a Brooklyn apartment with his Italian immigrant parents and two brothers, but was primarily raised in The Willamsburg Home for Children orphanage from three years of age, upon losing his mother in childbirth with her fourth child.

Noto joined the United States Merchant Marine during World War II. Wounded in Antwerp, Belgium, with a broken back, he was trapped under debris for hours in a bombed building, the result of a direct hit by a German V-2 rocket; Noto was selected among a group of ten men to be the first Merchant Seamen to be awarded the Purple Heart medal. He ended his military career as a Chief petty officer in the U.S. Maritime Service in 1946.

== Acting and producing career ==
He began acting in New York City in 1939. Noto also attended shows in hopes of becoming a producer. He attended a rehearsal of a one-act show in development, The Fantasticks, an allegorical "boy meets girl story" based on Les Romanesques by Edmond Rostand, and fell in love with the Barnard College musical production. He then commissioned the authors to create a two-act version suitable to debut in Greenwich Village in 1960. The opening of The Fantasticks, on May 3, 1960, met with mixed reviews. Four years later, in The New York Times, its creators, Harvey Schmidt and Tom Jones, recalled that Noto had kept the show running despite the criticism.

The curtain was ceremonially taken down on January 13, 2002, after the musical had played 17,162 performances. It became the "World's Longest Running Musical" in the Guinness World Records. Noto was mentioned a second time in the Guinness World Records, for achieving a world record of 6,348 performances as the longest-running actor in a single role in any production, having played Hucklebee (the Girl's father) for about 17 years in his own production of The Fantasticks (this record has been broken since Noto retired from the role). The show won an off-Broadway Obie Award, and a special Tony Award in 1992.

Noto co-wrote the musical theatre adaptation of the Marjorie Kinnan Rawlings book "The Yearling", which he produced at the Alvin Theatre on Broadway in 1965; the show played only three performances. During the time that he was writing the adaptation, he rented part of his Broadway office to Mel Brooks, who was working on the film The Producers (1967). The two became friendly. Lee Meredith was discovered during that time because Noto saw her in a showcase production of Carousel and knew Brooks would be impressed with the actress.

== Personal life ==
Noto died in 2002. In 1947, he married Mary née Luzzi, a published illustrator and homemaker, who died at 93 in 2020. The two had four children including one daughter, Janice Noto-Helmers, and sons Tony, Thad and Jody.
