= Breakfast with Les and Bess =

- Written by: Lee Kalcheim
- Characters: Bess Christen Dischinger; Les Dischinger; Shelby Dishinger Everson; Roger Everson; David Dischinger; Nate Moody/Announcer
- Original language: English
- Genre: Comedy

Premiere
- Date premiered: October 1982
- Place premiered: United States

Breakfast with Les and Bess was an off-Broadway play written by Lee Kalcheim that originally premiered at Hudson Guild Theatre in October 1982 before transferring to Lamb's Theatre in May 1983.

== Plot synopsis ==
It follows a radio celebrity couple with a morning show, similar to "Breakfast with Dorothy and Dick" and Tex and Jinx. This time the show is fictional "Breakfast with Les and Bess". The show follows them on- and off-air with their radical son David and strange daughter Shelby in 1961 in a Central Park South flat. Also appearing, a lost interview with Rainier III, Prince of Monaco and the new rock-music that threatens to change their way of life.

== Cast ==
The production at the Hudson Guild featured Holland Taylor as Bess, Keith Charles as Les, Amy Wright as Shelby, Tom Nolan as Roger, John Leonard as David, and Daniel Ziskie as Nate/Announcer.

When it moved to Lamb's Theatre, the cast was as follows: Holland Taylor as Bess, Keith Charles as Les, Kelle Kipp as Shelby, Jeff McCracken as Roger, John Leonard as David, and Daniel Ziskie as Nate/Announcer.

Productions were directed by Barnet Kellman, set design by Dean Tschetter, lighting design by Ian Calderon, costume design by Timothy Dunleavy, sound design by Michael Jay, and the stage manager was Andrea Naier.

== Character descriptions ==
- Bess - About 45, good looking, intelligent, stylish New York career woman and she puts her career before anything else. Not known to be sensitive or aware of others, but her public image matters very much. She never is deliberately mean with malicious intent she is just attached to things she cares about. Has yet to stop denying that her life is not everything she wants it to be.
- Les - Late 40s, attractive, easy going, has a sense-of-humor, and is a charming man. Misses being a sports announcer and sports columnist. He believes all of the success Bess and himself have are making their lives dismal, and wants to return to a life worth living. He does not like the phony social obligations. Loves to push Bess' buttons but will do anything to have them be madly in love again. He is able to see the problems and cope with them, but is sick and tired of just coping with them.
- Shelby - 20, slightly ditzy but cute. Impulsive and bizarre, but in a kind way. Full of life and energy. Will be defensive and pout because she feels she has a right to love and to attention. Still loves her parents and brother even with all they have been through.
- David - 20, typical 1960s rebel, wish is to change the world overnight, and has a strange attitude toward life. A witty prankster with the absence of his parents attention have made his outlook misanthropic. His antics tend to get him into hot water, but generally a good kid.
- Roger - 25, a handsome, muscular U.S. Navy ensign (rank), clean cut, honorable, practical Mormon from Utah. Healthy, stable, secure, regular American citizen not familiar with the New York "scene". He sometimes becomes discombublated as to how to handle his new family.
- Nate - 40, tall and lanky, Les' old broadcasting and drinking buddy, albeit he does not hide well the fact he cannot hold his liquor. He is everybody's friend, ready for whatever comes along.

== Play's Setting ==
- Act I:
  - Scene One: Early morning (Day 1)
  Act II:
  - Scene One: Early morning (Day 2)
    Scene Two: Early morning (Day 3)

== Critical reception ==
- "...Miss Taylor is one of the few utterly graceful, attractive, elegant and technically accomplished actresses in our theater...seeing her may turn you, like me, into a Taylor freak..." - New York magazine theater critic John Simon (critic)
