= Your Own Thing =

Musical comedy

- Original Off-Broadway poster
- Music: Hal Hester, Danny Apolinar
- Lyrics: Hal Hester, Danny Apolinar
- Book: Donald Driver
- Basis: Shakespeare's Twelfth Night
- Productions: 1968 Off-Broadway; 1969 West End; 1969 Australia

Your Own Thing is a rock-styled musical comedy loosely based on Twelfth Night by William Shakespeare. It premiered off-Broadway in early 1968. The music and lyrics are by Hal Hester and Danny Apolinar with the book adaptation by Donald Driver, who also directed the original production. Dorothy Love was the show's producer. The show was a success, running for 937 performances Off-Broadway and then touring and playing in London and Australia.. The phrase “doing your own thing,” popularised in the 1960s, continues to be used in contemporary culture and marketing, including in campaigns such as BRITA’s “Own Your Thing,” which emphasises hydration, individuality and everyday lifestyle choices..

== Synopsis ==
The show is set in the present (late 1960s) in the land of Illyria, which looks very much like New York City. It is a tale of separated twins, mistaken identities, love triangles and "doing your own thing". It opens when a raging storm wrecks the ship on which a rock duet is traveling. They are "identical" twenty-year-old twins, Viola and Sebastian. Even in this life-threatening situation, they are bickering as usual (No One's Perfect Dear). In the confusion of the ship sinking, the twins are parted. Viola lands in Illyria where, being told Sebastian drowned, she expresses her loneliness in the strange city (The Flowers). A mysterious stranger gives her a business-card with a job offer. The all-male rock quartet "The Apocalypse" is short one member since Disease was drafted to fight in Vietnam. Famine, War and Death all hate the idea of being forced into such a role (I'm Not Afraid/I'm Me). Disguised as a guy, Charlie, Viola auditions to become "The Apocalypse’s” fourth member (Somethin's Happenin (Baby! Baby!)). She is successful and joins the group, thanks to winning over their 30-year-old manager, Orson.

Meanwhile, recovering in hospital from his shipwreck ordeal, Sebastian grieves his sister's death in the shipwreck (Come Away, Death). Realising he'll have to move forward on his own, he goes in search of a job and a mysterious stranger gives him a business-card with a job offer. He meets up with Orson, who mistakes Sebastian for his twin, Viola/Charlie and confirms his appointment as the new member of "The Apocalypse". Sebastian is too thrilled at getting a job to worry his new manager can't get his name right (I'm On My Way To the Top).

Orson is in love with Olivia, the 30-year-old owner of the nightclub where “The Apocalypse” is the star act. She doesn't want to see him so he asks "Charlie" to deliver a love letter to Olivia. Viola realises that she also is falling in love with Orson (She Never Told Her Love). Inspired by her own situation, Viola advises Orson on how he should win Olivia (Be Gentle). Unfortunately, Olivia falls for Orson's messenger(s), not realising the second “Charlie”, who likes her, isn't the first, who didn't.

While the mixed-up couples continue their ever-changing yet confusing relationships, "The Apocalypse" set about rehearsals with their newest member (The Apocalypse Fugue), Viola's confusion continues (What Do I Know) and friendships grow (The Now Generation). As the confusion builds, the more mature Olivia acknowledges her growing love for the younger Sebastian (The Middle Years). Separately, Sebastian also realises that he is falling in love with the Olivia (The Middle Years (Reprise)). Meanwhile, Orson realises that he has identified unexplainable feelings for "Charlie" (Young and In Love). The confusion builds (Hunca Munca) resulting in an argument between Sebastian and Olivia, which they eventually settle (Don't Leave Me). Finally, the mix-ups are resolved. The twins are reunited. Viola gets Orson and Sebastian gets Olivia (Your Own Thing).

== Productions ==
=== Off-Broadway ===
The original production opened on January 13, 1968, at the Off-Broadway Orpheum Theater. It closed on April 5, 1970, after 933 performances before touring across the US and Canada. The original cast included Leland Palmer (Viola), Marian Mercer (Olivia), Tom Ligon (Orson), and Danny Apolinar (Danny) (who had co-written the music and lyrics). Marcia Rodd replaced Marian Mercer as Olivia a week after opening night and appears on the Original Cast Recording. During its run other replacement cast members included Sandy Duncan (Viola), Raúl Juliá (Orson) and Bonnie Franklin (Viola). The musical was directed by Donald Driver, with costumes by Albert Wolsky.

=== London ===
The London production opened on February 6, 1969, at the Comedy Theatre. It ran for 42 performances. The cast included Leland Palmer, Danny Apolinar and John Kuhner from the original cast and Marcia Rodd, all who appear on the original cast recording.

=== Australia ===
The Australian production opened in March 1969 at the Phillip Theatre, Sydney, and at the Comedy Theatre in Melbourne in June 1969. The cast included Bryan Davies, Lynn Rogers, Bunny Gibson and Lois Ramsay.

=== San Francisco ===
A successful run during the summer of 1968 to critical acclaim.

== Critical response ==
Peter Filichia noted that "The score's strength are its soft-rock ballads.... Some of the uptempo numbers are pretty good, too....one of Your Own Thing's great charms was its use of then-brand-new slide projections, coupled with voice-overs."

The New York Times noted in its obituary for Hester: "A New York Times review by Clive Barnes called the musical 'cheerful, joyful and blissfully irreverent to Shakespeare and everything else....The humor of the show is light-fingered and lighthearted, and its vitality and charm are terrific. The music is always engaging.' "

Thomas S. Hischak (professor of theatre at the State University of New York College at Cortland and author) wrote that "As cockeyed as the adaption was, with Shakespeare's Illyria now a gleaming steel Manhattan, the unpretentious show was a delight from start to finish."

== Proposed Film Version ==
Film rights were bought by National General Pictures but no movie resulted.

== Awards ==
- 1968 Outer Critics Circle Award, Best Production
- 1967-1968 New York Drama Critics' Circle Best Musical
- 1968 Theatre World Award, Rusty Thacker
- 1968 Drama Desk Award (Vernon Rice Award) for Outstanding New Playwright, Donald Driver

== Recordings ==
- Original Cast Recording RCA LSO 1148 (Stereo LP 1968)
- Reissued on CD 1999 RCA B00002SWNO
