= Keith Charles (actor) =

American actor

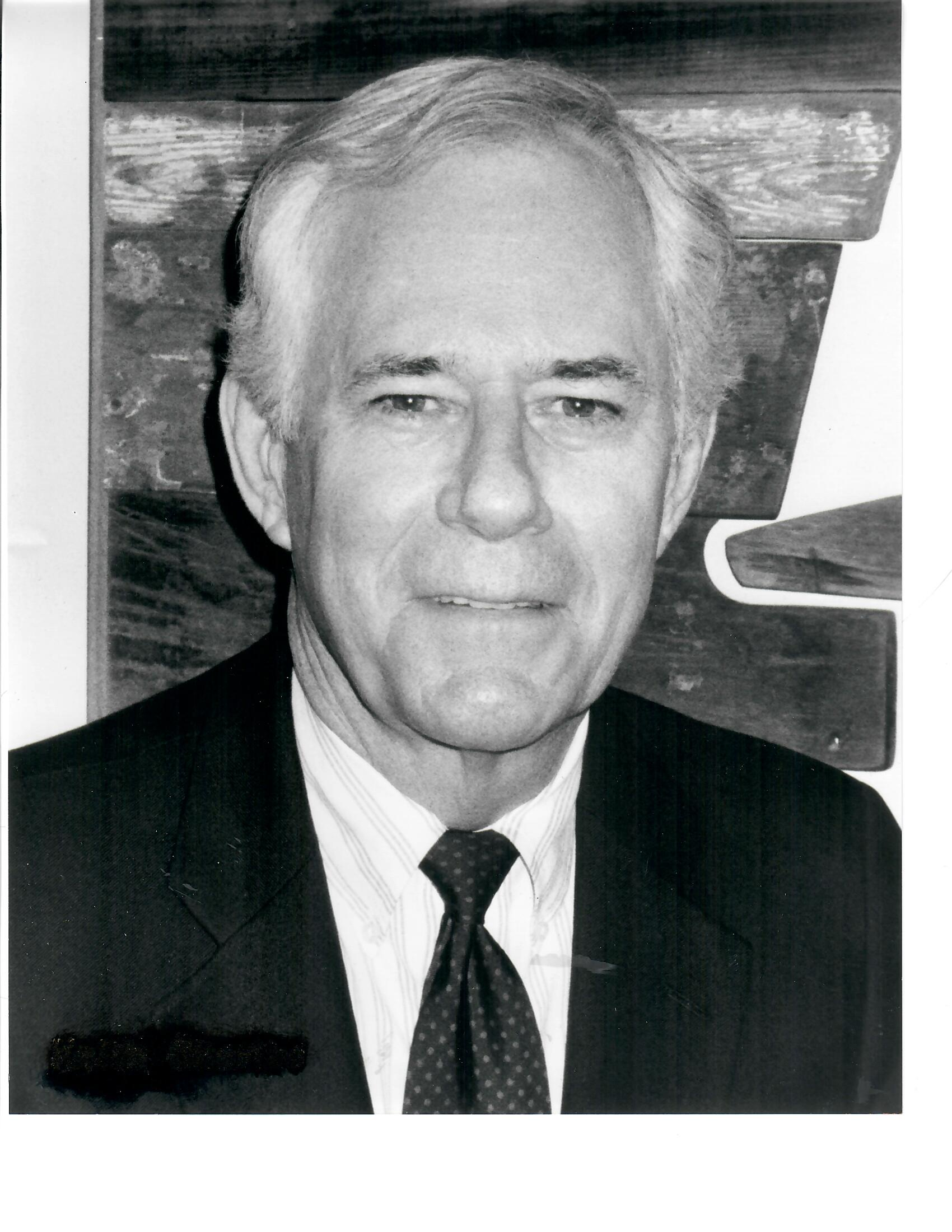
- Keith Charles ca. 2006
- Born: March 4, 1934; San Francisco, California, U.S.
- Died: July 1, 2008 (aged 74); New York City, New York, U.S.
- Occupation: Actor
- Years active: 1956–2003
- Spouse: Nancy Ford (Composer)

Keith Charles (March 4, 1934 – July 1, 2008) was an American theatre and television actor. His work included Broadway, off-Broadway, and television roles, including recurring parts on eight soap operas. On Broadway, he originated the role of Potemkin in Jones and Schmidt's Celebration. He replaced Len Cariou in Applause, playing opposite Lauren Bacall and later Anne Baxter and Arlene Dahl. On tour with Applause he starred with Eleanor Parker. His off-Broadway career began with The Fantasticks, and he later had a featured role in Kurt Vonnegut's Happy Birthday Wanda June. He starred opposite Holland Taylor in Breakfast with Les and Bess as Les.

He worked on such 1960s and 1970s soap operas as As the World Turns (Ralph Mitchell, 1977–1979, 1988–1994), The Edge of Night (Rick Oliver, 1966), The Secret Storm (Nick Kane, 1968–1970), Love of Life (Dr. Ted Chandler 1974–1975), Search for Tomorrow, and Where the Heart Is (Robert Jardin, 1972). He worked on The Guiding Light in three different roles (Professor Alexander "Alex" McDaniels, 1974–1975, Dr. Frank Nelson, 1980-1981 and Brandon Spaulding, 1984) and was the first actor to play Ted Clayton on One Life to Live, for a year until he was replaced by another actor. His television work also included guest appearances on such nighttime shows as Law & Order, Bob Newhart, Mary Tyler Moore, Cannon, Remington Steele, Kate and Allie, and Dallas.

Charles appeared in films such as Key Exchange, Colorforms, The Royal Tenenbaums, Longtime Companion and Drop Dead Fred.

Charles died at age 74, in New York City, from lung cancer.

== Selected filmography ==
Year	Film	Role	Notes
1985	Key Exchange	Mr. Simon	
1989	Longtime Companion	Martin	
1991	Drop Dead Fred	Murray	
2001	The Royal Tenenbaums	Royal's lawyer	
2003	Colorforms	Grandfather	
