= Celebration (musical) =

- Music: Harvey Schmidt
- Lyrics: Tom Jones
- Book: Tom Jones
- Productions: 1969 Broadway

Celebration is a musical with a book and lyrics by Tom Jones and music by Harvey Schmidt. The musical fable, employing a nearly bare stage, explores the contrasts between youth and old age, innocence and jaded corruption, love and ambition, and poverty and wealth.

It was presented on Broadway in 1969 and was not a financial success. Although the critics found the show interesting, it did not develop a broad following among audiences. The show has been revived occasionally.

== Background and production ==
Jones and Schmidt's previous work included the long-running Off-Broadway musical The Fantasticks and the more-mainstream Broadway musicals 110 in the Shade and I Do! I Do!.

Celebration is an avant-garde fable played on a set consisting of bare platforms, masks serving as the primary costumes, and a score played by a nine-piece band instead of a full-sized theater orchestra. There are four main roles (a narrator, a young woman (Angel), a young man (Orphan) and a wealthy old man (Rich)) and a chorus, the Revelers, who play various roles. "At the musical's core is the struggle between youth and old age, innocence and corruption, love and ambition, and poverty and wealth, as Angel tries to decide if she would be better served by her feelings for Orphan or Rich's willingness to fulfill her every dream."

Celebration opened on Broadway on January 22, 1969 at the Ambassador Theatre, and closed on April 26, 1969 after 109 performances and thirteen previews. Directed by Jones and choreographed by Vernon Lusby, the cast featured Ted Thurston as Rich, Susan Watson as Angel and Keith Charles as Potemkin, with Michael Glenn-Smith as Orphan. Ed Wittstein designed the scenic design, costumes and lighting.

Celebration has occasionally been presented in university and community productions since then and was produced in 1997 at the Ritz Theatre in Oaklyn, New Jersey. The show was produced at the 14th Street Theatre in New York in 2007–2008. Jones revised the ending of the show for a 2016 production at New Line Theatre in St. Louis, Missouri.

== Synopsis ==
Act I

The narrator, Potemkin, a Loki-like character, explains that if the world is on the brink of destruction, he wants to "seize the day" and celebrate being alive ("Celebration"). The masked Revelers join Potemkin in a primitive ceremonial dance, while Potemkin encourages the audience to participate. He describes the scene as a cold New Year's Eve. An innocent young man, Orphan, is an idealist trying to survive the cold and his tough world ("Orphan In The Storm"), but the Revelers taunt him. Potemkin, disguised as a tramp, befriends Orphan, who relates that his orphanage was purchased and eventually destroyed by a Mr. Rich. Orphan wants to find Rich to persuade him to restore the garden at the orphanage. Potemkin offers to be Orphan's guide and demonstrates how to cheat, steal, bow and scrape ("Survive").

Orphan and Potemkin enter the dwelling of Edgar Allen Rich, a wealthy old man. There, they see Angel, a beautiful girl with wings and halo, who does a flexible striptease down to sparkling pasties on her breasts and red panties, surprising Orphan and Potemkin, and ends up in Orphan's arms. Angel is the featured entertainer for the coming New Year's Eve party. She longs to be "Somebody" and rushes off to perform. Jaded Mr. Rich is the guest of honor. He eats lavishly while complaining about the food, his health, and his ennui ("Bored").

Orphan has a piece of stained-glass, the eye of God, from the orphanage chapel window. Mr. Rich demands that Orphan leave, but Potemkin negotiates a deal: If Orphan can make the old man feel alive again, Mr. Rich will restore the orphanage ("My Garden"). Angel and the Revelers join the singing, and Mr. Rich forgets himself and begins to conduct the group. His is finally moved to tears: he can feel emotion again. Mr. Rich describes his life story, beginning as a penniless young man and eventually becoming a successful businessman, manufacturing products that replace real things with artificial ones such as wax fruit, glass eyes, paper flowers and falsies. His retelling, however, adds to his despair ("Where Did It Go?"). Orphan, an optimist, urges the old man to see the beauty in life. Potemkin has an idea: since Orphan reminds Mr. Rich of his younger self, Orphan will portray a youthful Mr. Rich and pretend to fall in love with Angel by singing a romantic ballad. Angel is unsure about this plan; she is not a romantic, but she is willing to give it a chance ("Love Song").

The scene gradually turns from cold and bleak to green and summerlike, as Potemkin acts as ring master and increases the pace of the revelry. Mr. Rich and Orphan seem to blend together, and Angel finds herself torn between the two. Potemkin oversees the holiday pageant as midnight approaches and he gives a note to Orphan. Overjoyed, Orphan goes to meet Angel in the garden ("To The Garden").

Act II

In the garden, Angel looks stunning in gems and furs; Orphan is also struck by the beauty of the garden ("I'm Glad to See You've Got What You Want"). The partiers arrive, and Mr. Rich expresses his joy, dancing wildly with Angel ("It's You Who Makes Me Young"). But he soon argues with Orphan about who owns the property, and orders the garden destroyed. Potemkin refuses to help Orphan ("Not My Problem"). Orphan halts the machines that are about to destroy the garden by holding up his glass amulet ("Fifty Million Years Ago"). He says that he is an intermediary between the past and the future as he defies Mr. Rich.

Attendants and beauticians prepare Mr. Rich for the midnight New Year's party, making him look young. He narcissistically looks into a mirror and sees Orphan's face in his reflection. He is overjoyed at his youthful "transformation" ("The Beautician Ballet"). Just before midnight, the champagne is flowing, and Potemkin is costumed as Father Time. Belly dancers, masks and noise-makers all add to the carnival atmosphere. Angel is dressed as Eve ("Under The Tree"). She focuses on Mr. Rich with her seductive dance, but dances with Orphan in a unicorn mask. When Orphan removes the mask, Mr. Rich realizes that he has been tricked. The Revelers act out the conflict between age and youth in a stylized scene, portraying Mr. Rich as winter and Orphan as summer. Each claims Angel her for himself ("Winter and Summer"). Potemkin, as Father Time, calls out the hours, one by one, as Mr. Rich ages and collapses at the stroke of twelve.

Everyone is unmasked and must confront reality. Orphan sees that the garden is destroyed; Angel knows that she will never be a star. Potemkin blesses Angel and Orphan with a prayer for their survival; they walk to the world outside ("Celebration" (Reprise)).

== Song list ==
Act I

- "Celebration" – Potemkin and Revelers
- "Orphan in the Storm" – Orphan and Revelers
- "Survive" – Potemkin and Revelers
- "Somebody" – Angel and Hittites
- "Bored" – Rich
- "My Garden" – Orphan and Revelers
- "Where Did It Go?" – Rich and Sycophants
- "Love Song" – Angel, Potemkin, Rich, Orphan and Revelers
- "To the Garden" – Company

Act II

- "I'm Glad to See You've Got What You Want" – Angel and Orphan
- "It's You Who Makes Me Young" – Rich and Revelers
- "Not My Problem" – Potemkin and Machines
- "Fifty Million Years Ago" – Orphan
- "Beautician Ballet" – Rich and Revelers
- "Saturnalia" – Potemkin and Revelers
- "Under the Tree" – Angel and Animals
- "Winter and Summer" – Company
- "Celebration" (reprise) – Company

== Critical reception ==
According to Otis Guernsey Jr., "Celebration's lyrics are strongly poetic. It suffers its moments of cynicism and despair, even of ugliness, but its theme of regeneration always finds the upbeat. Vernon Lusby's choreography illustrated each sardonic turn of the fable, and the design was a visual marvel of symbolic scenery, costumes and gargoyle masks by Ed Wittstein. ... Celebration struggled forward in an effort to find its audience. It was urged on by the enthusiasm of a few major critics and joyful members of the public who half-filled its auditorium."

Thomas Hischak wrote that it was "an allegorical piece" "performed as an ancient ritual." He further noted that "The score was eerie yet accessible. ... The critics were somewhat fascinated and complimentary. ... Many felt Celebration belonged Off Broadway."
