= Word Baker =

American theatre impresario (1923–1995)

Charles "Word" Baker (March 21, 1923 – October 31, 1995) was an American theatre director and teacher who is most famous for mounting the original off-Broadway production of The Fantasticks.

== Early life and education ==
Baker was born and raised in Honey Grove, Texas. He first found his love of music and theatre by listening to his mother Maggie teach and play the organ at the local Presbyterian church. After high school Baker decided to study drama at the University of Texas at Austin, where he met future collaborators Tom Jones and Harvey Schmidt. As a graduate student from 1948 to 1951 he, along with Jones and Schmidt, created a theatrical revue which sparked the main outline of The Fantasticks.

== Theatrical career ==
When Baker moved to New York in 1956, he decided to replace his first name with his mother's maiden name, Word. Baker's first Broadway credit was as a replacement stage manager in the musical Happy Hunting. It wasn't until his former college friends, Jones and Schmidt, decided to give him a call that he got his big break. Baker got his New York City directing debut at The Sullivan Street Playhouse in Greenwich Village in 1960. The original production of The Fantasticks, in the small 150-seat theatre, spawned a run that lasted more than forty years and for 17,162 performances. In 1961, Baker directed the musical's West End production, which opened to mixed reviews. The only Broadway production that Baker directed was as a replacement in 1962 for the show A Family Affair. After an almost 16 year hiatus, Baker would return to direct the off-Broadway production of I'm Getting My Act Together and Taking It on the Road, which he would take to London three years later.

Baker also directed the televised version of The Glass Menagerie, which starred Lillian Gish.

== Later life and death ==
After 1978, Baker did not return to New York to direct, but instead focused on teaching. Baker taught theatrical directing at institutions such as Carnegie Mellon, Boston Conservatory, University of Cincinnati – College-Conservatory of Music, and his alma mater.

Baker's wife Joanna died in 1966. They had three daughters: Barbara, Betsy, and Lucy. Baker died at age 72 in Paris, Texas.
