= Carole Demas =

American singer and actress

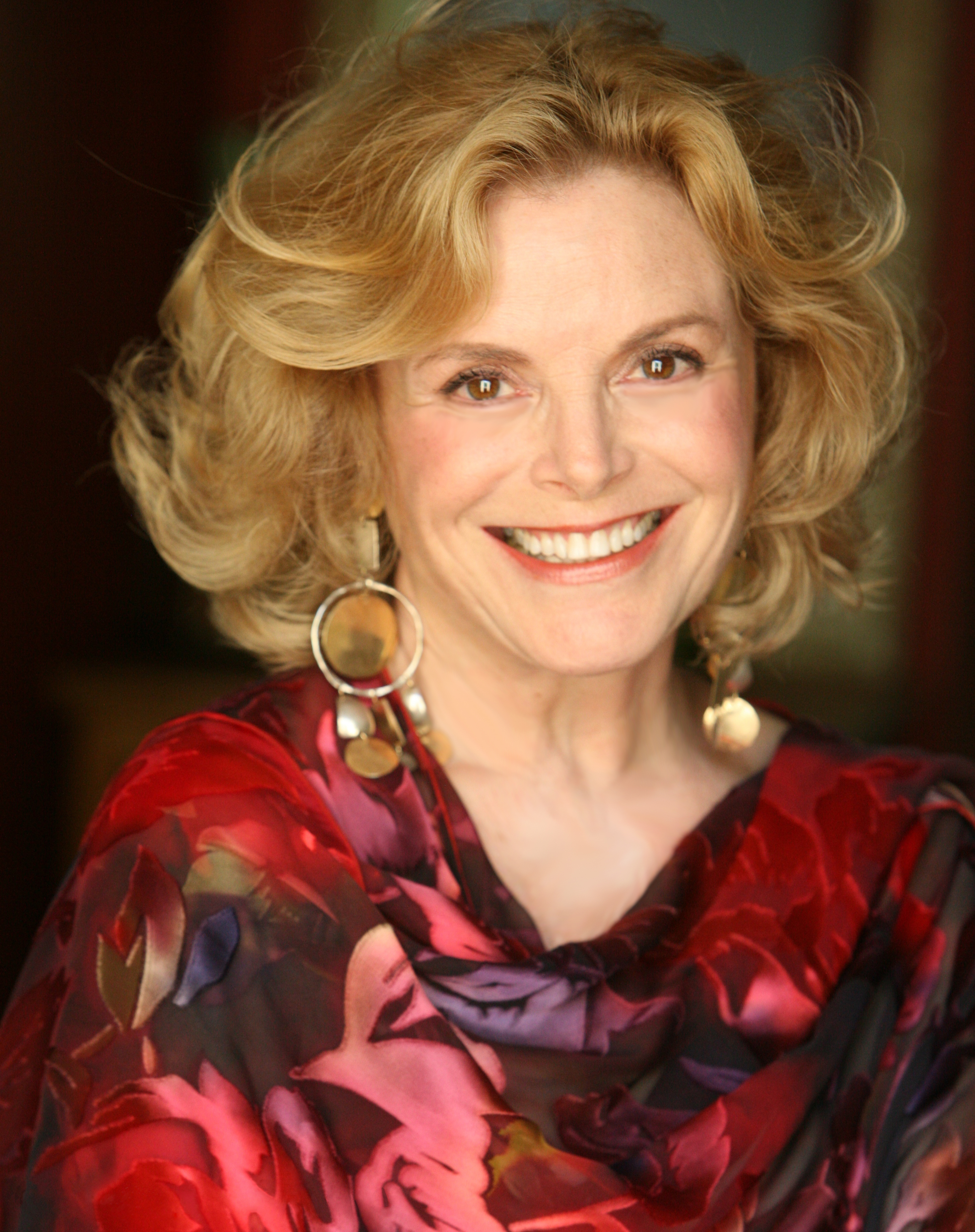
- Demas in 2008
- Born: May 26, 1940 (age 86); Brooklyn, New York, U.S.
- Occupation: Actress
- Years active: 1960–present
- Spouse: Stuart Allyn (m. 1983)

Carole Demas (born May 26, 1940, in Brooklyn, New York) is a retired American singer and actress, best known for originating the roles of Sandy in the 1971 Broadway musical Grease and the title role in the original 1976 production of The Baker's Wife, for many prime time television roles, hundreds of commercials, and for her role in the long-running children's television show The Magic Garden.

== Biography ==
Demas was born in Brooklyn, New York in 1940. She attended Midwood High School in Brooklyn. She holds a B.A. in English from the University of Vermont and continued her studies at the New York University Graduate School of Education. She spent several years as a teacher in the New York City Board of Education system including a sentimental semester teaching at P.S. 198 in Brooklyn, which she had attended from grade 5 through graduation.

She made her theatrical debut with the Champlain Shakespeare Festival. Later, she was featured for four seasons with the New York Shakespeare Festival Elizabethan Singers as one of a quartet consisting of Paula Janis (her eventual co-star on The Magic Garden) and their brothers, Jonathan Rosen and Alex Demas. During her appearances she was "discovered" by theatrical agents, which lead to her ingenue lead in Fred Ebb's new book musical Morning Sun, and her continued career on stage, television and film. While in attendance at the University of Vermont she competed to become Miss Vermont in the Miss Universe pageant.

Off-Broadway, Demas sang the ingenue lead in Fred Ebb's Morning Sun (with Patricia Neway and Bert Convy). She was also seen Off-Broadway in Rondelay and starred in How to Steal an Election, and as “The Girl” in The Fantasticks at the Sullivan Street Playhouse. Demas' association with Tom Jones and Harvey Schmidt, creators of The Fantasticks (the longest running Off-Broadway show in theatre history), led to her participation in the workshop “Portfolio”. As an active member of “Portfolio”, she was seen off-off-Broadway as the original female lead in Philemon.

On Broadway, she appeared in A Race of Hairy Men and Grease as the female lead, "Sandy Dumbrowski". Her credits in stock and regional theatre include major roles in Barefoot in the Park (with Joan Bennett), Enter Laughing, Absence of a Cello (as Hans Conried's daughter), A Funny Thing Happened on the Way to the Forum as “Philia”, Oh, What a Lovely War and her favorites, Another Part of the Forest as “Regina” at the Pennsylvania State Repertory Theatre, and Celebration at A.C.T. in Seattle as “Angel." In New York and Los Angeles, Carole has also been seen in her Cabaret Act, which is an ongoing project. She was one of the many stars assembled by Lorimar Productions for their taping of “The Best Of Broadway”—in which memorable moments from Broadway musicals were recreated by the original stars as part of the PBS series Great Performances.

Demas guest-starred on many TV shows, among them Barnaby Jones, Kojak, Mannix, Fantastic Journey, The Man from Atlantis, and The Edge of Night. Most recently, she played the recurring role of Hannah Lafferty on As the World Turns.

Demas and co-star Paula Janis starred in the popular children's TV program The Magic Garden, which was seen on WPIX-TV for over 12 years. During this time, they formed CAP Productions, Inc., and produced and three records for children, selling over 100,000 copies to date.{{Citation needed}} They wrote and starred in over 100 "Live" SRO appearances, bringing music to thousands of children and their families at their many performances at Town Hall, Symphony Space, The Shubert Theatre (New Haven), The Shakespeare Theatre (Stratford, Connecticut), The Paper Mill Playhouse, The McCarter Theatre, The Bardavon Playhouse, Colden Center, The Walt Whitman Theatre and at various other fund-raising events. In addition to the three children's albums already completed (“Paula and Carole in the Magic Garden”, “Tales from the Storybox” and “Musical Goose on the Loose”), CAP Productions will release “Cottonmill Girls”, a collection of folk songs of the American textile mills, arranged and performed by Alex Demas.{{Citation needed}} Also in the works is “Tales from the Storybox, Volume 2” a sequel to the already successful Volume I. Under their CAP Productions banner, Carole and her partner wrote, produced and starred in “A Magic Garden Christmas”, a one-hour television special. This program received a local Emmy nomination and will soon be available on home video.{{Citation needed}}

Demas has been seen and heard in over 200 television commercials, promoting everything from peanut butter to tires, and a few times, singing the jingle on camera for the commercial.

She continued performing in concert and Cabaret all over the world, headlining on Crystal Cruise to French Polynesia, in Barbados for 2 years, and on St. Croix for 2 benefit concerts. She has done numerous benefit and fundraising concerts in New York for various causes. She has performed at Cabaret spaces including Feinstein's 54 Below, The Laurie Beechman Theatre, Don't Tell Mama, Urban Stages, etc.

In 2017, she set out with fellow Broadway star Sarah Rice (who debuted the role of "Johanna" in Sweeney Todd) to create a show honoring Tom Jones and Harvey Schmidt, who created The Fantastiks. The show, Thank You For Your Love, premiered at the Laurie Beechman Theatre the following year and received a Bistro Award. In 2019, the show was expanded to two full acts and premiered on Long Island at the John Engeman Theatre.

In 2020, she began a monthly livestream concert series - Live from Skylight Run.

== Personal life ==
Demas is married to sound designer/recording engineer/producer, Stuart J. Allyn.

== Career ==
=== Theater ===
Demas's theater career began in 1963 as the ingenue lead (opposite Bert Convy and starring Patricia Neway) in Morning Sun, an early Fred Ebb effort (before his partnership with John Kander). She was next cast in a Starring role Off-Broadway in Rondelay and then in How To Steal An Election opposite Clifton Davis. She was later cast as a replacement for the role of "Louisa (The Girl)" in The Fantasticks, and starred in that role for more than 2 years. Her work with Tom Jones and Harvey Schmidt continued with the Portfolio workshop and her starring in their productions of Philemon and The Bone Room. In 1971, Demas was cast in the title role of the revival of No, No, Nanette, but was dismissed from the cast during rehearsals, owing to a disagreement between the director and the casting director.

Demas was next cast as "Sandy" in the original Broadway production of Grease. At age 31, she was the oldest member of the principal cast. She worked with writers Jim Jacobs and Warren Casey to develop the role, which, in the original Chicago play (Grease Lightning) on which the musical was based, was considered too dark for the mainstream Broadway audience. Demas left Grease to join the cast of a new musical, The Baker's Wife, produced by David Merrick. The play, which was being produced in Los Angeles in preparation for a national tour prior to a Broadway opening, proved problematic from the start, and several efforts were made to fix it, including replacing Demas with Patti LuPone, but to no avail. The Baker's Wife never came to Broadway.

Regional theatre credits include major roles in Barefoot in the Park, Enter Laughing, Absence of a Cello, A Funny Thing Happened on the Way to the Forum (as "Philia"), Oh, What a Lovely War, Another Part of the Forest (as "Regina") at the Pennsylvania State Repertory Theatre, and as "Angel" in Celebration at ACT in Seattle.

=== Television and film ===
While working in Grease, Demas and long-time friend Paula Janis began starring in the television show The Magic Garden for WPIX-TV in New York City. She and Janis continued presenting this daily children's television show from 1972 until 1984, with live concerts continuing long after the television show stopped being broadcast. They also co-wrote and appeared in two 1-hour specials, A Magic Garden Christmas, and The Magic Garden——Still Growing. WPIX-TV has continued to feature them in news stories and on the web with Magic Garden Moments.

For the popular PBS Series Great Performances, Carole joined other stars of the Great White Way for Lorimar's Showstoppers—The Best of Broadway, in which memorable moments from Broadway musicals were recreated by the original stars. Demas has also appeared as a guest actor on many daytime and primetime series, including One Life to Live, The Edge of Night, Barnaby Jones, Mannix, Kojak, N.Y.P.D., The Man from Atlantis, and more recently Blue Bloods and Allegiance.

Carole was featured in the films, The 300 Year Weekend ( with William DeVane), and her other films include The Space Works for Trans-Lux Corp. and A Lovely Way to Die for Universal Films.

=== Concerts and cabaret ===
Demas turned to concerts and cabaret in her later life. She has produced her one-woman show Summer Nights at the Laurie Beechman Theatre, and appears often in Broadway reviews, retrospectives, and fundraiser concerts:

- Town Hall’s Broadway Originals concert, Town Hall, NYC — featured
- Off-Broadway Close Up, Merkin Concert Hall, NYC
- 50th Anniversary concerts for WBAI Radio, The Fantasticks (Night of 1000 Luisas) and The Lincoln Center Library For The Performing Arts
- Gypsy of the Year at the New Amsterdam Theater, NYC
- Afternoon of Broadway Stars, Crystal Cruise Symphony, Galaxy Theatre, French Polynesia
- Steve Ross' Broadway, Ziegfeld Society, Lang Hall, NYC
- Broadway by the Year 1972 at Town Hall, NYC
- Carole Demas and Friends benefit for the Westchester Land Trust, Westchester Broadway Theatre, Elmsford, NY
- Broadway on St. Croix, The Reef Pavilion, St. Croix, U.S.Virgin Islands
- Broadway Returns to Barbados, Frank Colymore Hall, Bridgetown, Barbados
- One Enchanted Evening, The Caribbean Theatre, Christiansted, St. Croix, U.S.Virgin Islands
- Winter Rhythms, Urban Stages, NYC
- Concerts for City Greens, Tudor City, NY
- Actor's Fund, Broadway Cares benefit at Signature Theatre, NYC
- benefit concert for the Irvington Town Hall Theatre, Irvington, New York
- Primary Stages annual gala
- Benefit concert for Zani's Furry Friends, Birdland, New York City
- Huntington's disease benefit concert, NYIT Auditorium
- "Broadway Ballyhoo" at 54 Below, New York City
- Sondheim Unplugged - 54 Below, New York City
- Broadway Concerts Direct - Blooming Grove Series
- Broadway Originals - 54 Below, New York City
- Thank You For Your Love - Laurie Beechman Theater, New York City - Bistro Award Winner, 2x Mac Nominee
- Firefly - 54 Below, New York City - Broadway World Award Winner - Best Celebrity Show

=== Roles ===
Title	Role	Notes
Theater
Grease	Sandy	Originated role
A Race of Hairy Men	Understudy	
The Baker's Wife	Geneviève	Title role Originated role
The Fantasticks	Luisa (The Girl)	
How to Steal an Election	Female Lead	
Rondelay	The Maid	Featured role
Morning Sun	Mellie	Ingenue lead
Philemon	Female Lead	Jones-Schmidt Portfolio
The Bone Room	Female Lead	Jones-Schmidt Portfolio
Barefoot in the Park	Corrie	
Enter Laughing	Wanda	
Absence of a Cello	Joanna	
Celebration	Angel	
Another Part of the Forest	Regina	
A Funny Thing Happened on the Way to the Forum	Philia	
Oh, What a Lovely War	Multiple Featured Roles	
Henry IV, Part I	Margaret	Champlain Shakespeare Festival
As You Like It	Phoebe	Champlain Shakespeare Festival
Much Ado About Nothing	Hero	Champlain Shakespeare Festival
Television
Showstoppers - Great Performances (PBS)	Guest Star	
The Magic Garden	Carole	
Blue Bloods	Mrs. Beth Eastman	Season 4, Episode 2: "The City That Never Sleeps"
A Magic Garden Christmas (TV special)	Carole	1 hour TV Special, airing 3 consecutive years
One Life to Live	guest	Recurring
The Edge of Night	Dr. Lyn Wallis	Recurring
Barnaby Jones	Guest	Two episodes
The Fantastic Journey	Guest Star	
The Man from Atlantis	Guest Star	
N.Y.P.D.	Featured Role	
Dilby (The Paul Ford Show)	Leading role	Pilot only
Kojak	Guest Star	
Mannix	Guest Star	
Khan!	Guest Star	
Route 66	Featured Role	
Allegiance	Guest Star	NBC-TV
FYI	Featured Role	
Film
The Space Works (Trans-Lux Corp)	Female Lead	
The 300 Year Weekend (ABC Feature Film, 1971)	Leading Role	
A Lovely Way to Die (Universal Films, 1968)	Featured Role	

== Recordings ==
- Grease - Original Broadway Cast Album (1972)
- How to Steal an Election - Original Off-Broadway Cast Album
- Carole and Paula in the Magic Garden - Original Cast Album
- Carole and Paula: Tales from the Storybox
- Carole and Paula: Musical Goose on the Loose
- Green Songs - Champlain Shakespeare Minstrels
- Festival Line Singers In Concert - New York Shakespeare Festival Line Singers
- Hidden Treasures-Jones and Schmidt - 2018

== Miscellaneous ==
- Demas was inducted into the Long Island Music Hall of Fame in 2010
- Demas serves on the advisory board of The New York Children's Theatre Festival

== Personal life ==
Demas currently resides in Westchester County, New York with her husband, Stuart Allyn.
