= The Office! A Musical Parody =

Parody Musical

The Office!
- A Parody Musical
- Music: Assaf Gleizner
- Lyrics: Bob McSmith; Tobly McSmith
- Book: Bob McSmith; Tobly McSmith
- Basis: The Office by Greg Daniels
- Premiere: September 24, 2018: The Jerry Orbach Theater

The Office! A Musical Parody is a musical with book and lyrics by Bob and Tobly McSmith, and music by Assaf Gleizner. It is a parody of the popular American television show The Office.

== History ==
The show began performances at The Jerry Orbach Theatre on September 24, 2018, with an official opening on October 3, 2018. Opening night cast consisted of Sarah Mackenzie Baron, Michael Santora, Tom McGovern, Taylor Coriell, Katie Johantgen, Rebecca Mason-Wygal, and Ani Djirdjirian. The off-Broadway production was directed by Donald Garverick, with music direction by Tegan Miller and original casting by Lindsay Brooks.

The show temporarily closed due to the COVID-19 pandemic, and resumed performances on April 9, 2021, becoming the first musical to be staged in New York City following the pandemic. Cast members of the original series Jenna Fisher and Angela Kinsey attended a performance in May 2022. After seven years, the show announced that the musical will close on March 21, 2026. The show held its last performance on April 11, 2026.

== Musical Numbers ==
=== Act 1 ===
- Scranton (The Electric City)
- We Have Fun Here
- Sweet Little Moments
- That's What She...
- Not Gonna Close This Shop
- Assistant to the Regional Manager
- Sweet Little Moments (Reprise)
- Chris-O'Ween-Dwalaaka-Birth-A-Earth-A-Kwanzaa
- Such a Hot and Sexy Temp
- Little Moments (Reprise 2)
- You're the White One for Me
- Dundies

=== Act 2 ===
- Fun Run
- I've Got Chilli
- Kathy Bates
- Paper Cut Heart
- Candle Party
- I'm Nasty
- Chilli Reprise
- The Breakable Erin Hanlon
- Marry Me Beesly
- Threat Level Mid Afternoon
- That's What She Said (She Said She Loves Me)
- Finale
