= The Theater Center =

Off-Broadway theater in New York City

Coordinates: 40°45′41″N 73°59′3.78″W

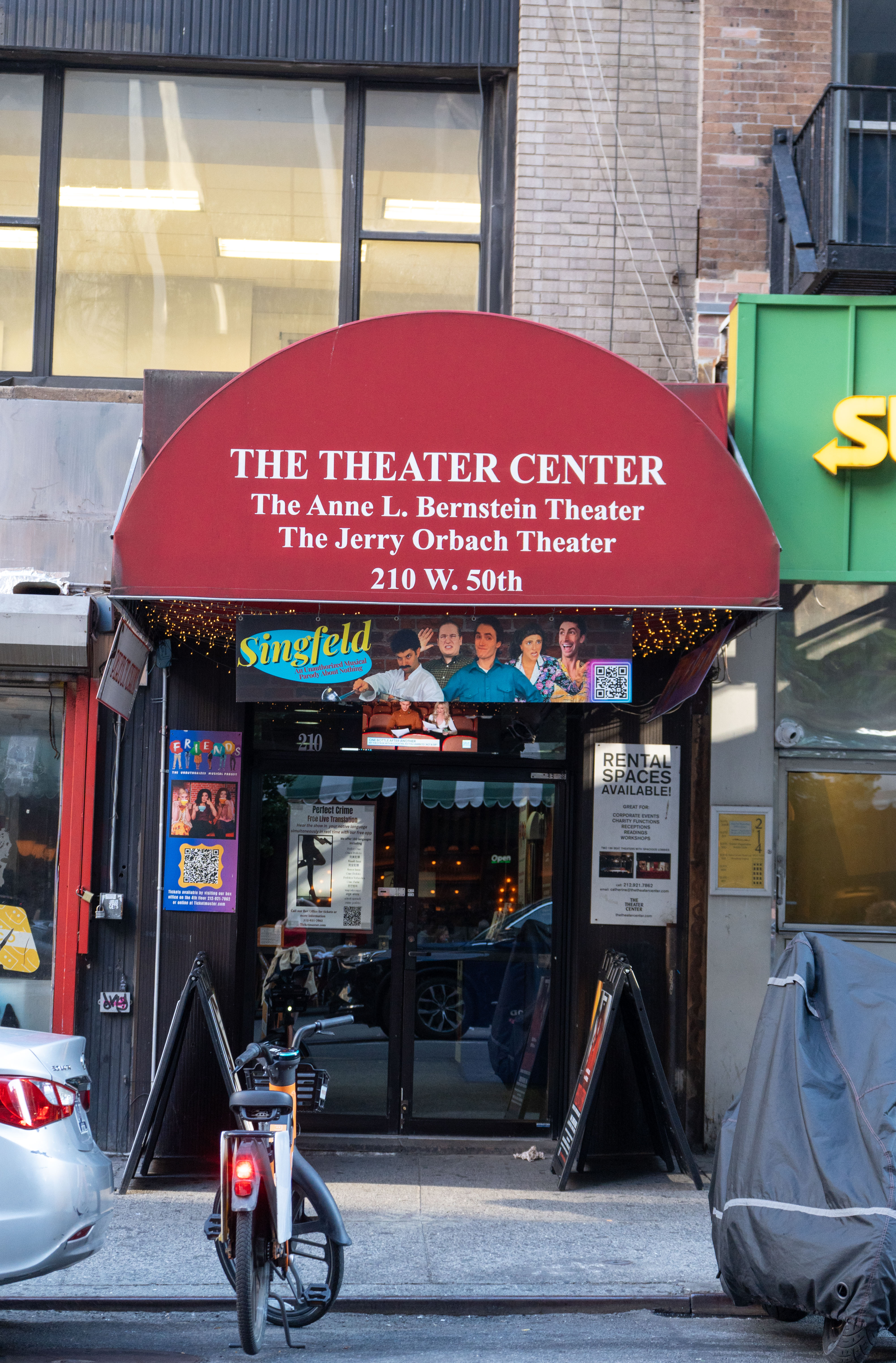
- The Theater Center in June 2026
- Interactive map of The Theater Center
- Address: 210 West 50th Street; New York City; United States
- Owner: Catherine Russell
- Capacity: Jerry Orbach: 199; Anne L. Bernstein: 199
- Type: Off-Broadway
- Production: Perfect Crime. The Office! A Musical Parody

Construction
- Opened: May 22, 2006

Website
- www.thetheatercenter.com

The Theater Center (known as The Snapple Theater Center from 2006 until 2016) is an off-Broadway theater on 50th Street in Manhattan, New York City. It has two stages.

== History ==
The complex was built by actress and producer Catherine Russell in partnership with Snapple, marking Off-Broadway's first such corporate sponsorship. It opened as the Snapple Theater Center on May 22, 2006, with Wendy Kaufman, "the Snapple Lady," ceremonially lighting the marquee. In May 2016, the theater dropped "Snapple" from its name and became "The Theater Center".

== Facilities ==
The Theater Center is a 20,000-square-foot (1,900 m^{2}) state of the art entertainment center consisting of two theaters with a total seating capacity of 398, rehearsal studios, contemporary lobbies, WiFi, two bars with cabaret-style seating and two merchandise stands. There are two stages, the Anne L. Bernstein Theater and the Jerry Orbach Theater. Each theater seats 199 people.

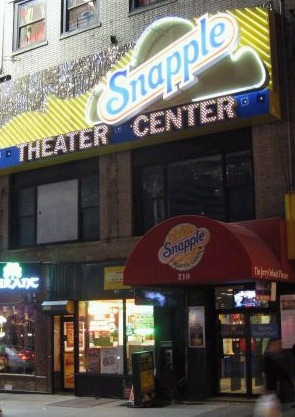
The Theater Center in 2008 when it was still named The Snapple Theater Center

=== Jerry Orbach Theater ===
A revival of The Fantasticks was first mounted here in summer 2007. That same year, the space was named in honor of actor Jerry Orbach, who starred as El Gallo in that show's original production in 1960. The Fantasticks closed in June 2017.

Various other productions came to the Jerry Orbach thereafter.

=== Anne L. Bernstein Theater ===
Long-running play Perfect Crime, starring Catherine Russell, transferred to the Theater Center upon the facility's opening in 2006.

In 2012, the space was named for producer Anne L. Bernstein.

In April 2021, Perfect Crime was the first live stage production in New York City to receive approval from Actors' Equity to resume performances after theatres were shuttered due to the COVID-19 pandemic. In January, 2022, thieves stole copper pipes from the building, disabling the plumbing and heating and necessitating the cancellation of twelve performances of Perfect Crime. As of October 2025, Perfect Crime continues its run in the space.
