= Perfect Crime (play) =

Longest-running play in New York City history

- Original language: English
- Written by: Warren Manzi
- Characters: Margaret Thorne Brent; Inspector James Ascher; W. Harrison Brent; Lionel Mcauley; David Breuer

Premiere
- Date: April 18, 1987
- Place: Courtyard Playhouse, Grove Street, West Village, New York City

Perfect Crime is a 1987 murder mystery/thriller play by Warren Manzi. It tells the story of Margaret Thorne Brent, a Connecticut psychiatrist and potential cold-blooded killer who may have committed "the perfect crime." When her wealthy husband, W. Harrison Brent, turns up dead, she gets caught in the middle of a terrifying game of cat and mouse with her deranged patient, Lionel McAuley, and Inspector Ascher, the handsome but duplicitous investigator assigned to the case.

Perfect Crime premiered in 1987, and became the longest-running play in New York City history when it had its 15,000th performance on December 5, 2024.

== History ==
Perfect Crime was originally optioned for Broadway in 1980 by Morton Gottlieb, just after author Manzi graduated from the Yale School of Drama. At age 25, Manzi, then understudying Tim Curry for the role of Wolfgang Amadeus Mozart in Amadeus on Broadway, was one of the youngest American authors ever to have a play optioned for Broadway. After producer Morton Gottlieb wanted to change the play's title to Guilty Hands, Manzi lost interest and went to Hollywood to write screenplays, including one of the many versions of the film Clue.

With the script sitting in a drawer for several years, the play ultimately began its life in 1987, in Greenwich Village at the Courtyard Playhouse on Grove Street, produced by the Actors Collective, a not-for-profit theater company where Manzi was serving as artistic director. Commercial producer Armand Hyatt moved the show immediately after its four-week limited run to an Off-Broadway venue.

Since opening on April 18, 1987, Perfect Crime has played for more than 15,000 performances, starring Catherine Russell. It was directed by Jeffrey Hyatt until his passing in 2021. It played in a number of New York theaters over the years including:

- Courtyard Playhouse (April–August 1987)
- Second Stage Theater, the McGinn Cazale Theater (August–October 1987)
- the 47th Street Theater (October–December 1987, August– December 1990)
- INTAR Theatre (January–April 1988)
- the Harold Clurman Theater (May 1988–August 1990)
- Theatre Four, now the Julia Miles Theater (January 1991–September 1993)
- Duffy Theater, 46th Street and Broadway, in a renovated burlesque house above the former Howard Johnson's (January 1994–April 2005)
- The Theater Center located at the corner of 50th Street and Broadway (April 2005–present)

In 2005, the play was called "an urban legend" by The New York Times critic Jason Zinoman because of its inconspicuousness despite its long run.

In November 2016, Gary Busey spent two weeks in the role of Lionel.

In March 2020 due to the COVID-19 outbreak and state mandated venue restrictions Perfect Crime suspended performances. Performances resumed on April 17, 2021 becoming the first off-Broadway production in New York City to reopen with approval from Actors Equity.

== Catherine Russell ==
The play's leading lady, Catherine Russell, has performed the role of Margaret Thorne Brent since the beginning of the play's run in 1987. She has never taken a sick day and holds the world record for the most performances as the same character in a play. She has missed only four performances, the last in 1995 to attend her brother's wedding.

== Characters ==
- Margaret Thorne Brent, a psychiatrist
- Philip Reynolds, posing as W. Harrison Brent, Margaret's husband, also a psychiatrist
- Inspector James Ascher
- Lionel McAuley, a patient of Margaret's
- David Breuer, host of a local cable television show (appears on videotape)

== Plot ==
One Sunday night, at the home of the wealthy Brents, psychiatrists living in a swanky Connecticut community, a woman shoots a man. By the time handsome detective James Ascher arrives, the body is gone. Ascher suspects the wife, Margaret Thorne Brent, a smart and sharp-tongued psychiatrist and novelist, although her patients are also suspect. One of her patients, Lionel McAuley, seeks fame as the "Baseball Bat Killer": he had previously killed his wife's lovers. During the course of his week-long investigation, more people are murdered (with a baseball bat), and Ascher finally learns the following:

Margaret and her husband Harrison had been rehearsing a nightmare, for some time, with her patient Carlotta Donovan involving Carlotta's pretending to shoot and kill a man. Six months ago, Harrison, during one of these role playing therapy sessions, committed suicide by putting real bullets in the gun he gave to Carlotta. Realizing that she had just killed Harrison, Carlotta also committed suicide. When Margaret returned home to find the dead bodies, she hid Harrison's body behind the fireplace brickwork and, after disfiguring Carlotta's dead body to disguise its identity, sank it in Scotty's Pond. Knowing that Harrison's huge fortune would revert to his family in England upon his death, she quickly arranged for a former lover, Phillip Reynolds, to impersonate Harrison until she could transfer all of his accounts.

During Ascher's investigation, Reynolds kills Mrs. Johaneston, the cook, when she realizes that he is an imposter. Margaret's patient McAuley takes credit for the murders of Harrison and Carlotta and then Mrs. Johaneston. Nevertheless, Reynolds also kills McAuley, because McAuley witnessed Phillip and Margaret enter Mrs. Johaneston's apartment on the night of her murder. Believing that Margaret was falling in love with Ascher, the insanely jealous Reynolds, after beating McAuley to death, flees to England, leaving Margaret in the house with the dead body lying in her office as the police arrive.

Ascher also finds, to everyone's surprise, that Margaret was Carlotta's birth mother, that Carlotta had tracked down Margaret and become Harrison's lover. It is not clear whether her birth father was Harrison or Reynolds. Carlotta had hoped to work her way into the Brents' lives, angry at her English upbringing by a sexually abusive adoptive father rather than by the wealthy Brents. When Margaret finds out that Carlotta was her daughter and that she will be arrested as an accessory to the murders of Mrs. Johaneston and McAuley, she tries to commit suicide, but Ascher has filled her gun with blanks.

A key clue to Ascher's finding Harrison's body in the fireplace is a painting on the fireplace brickwork that Ascher realizes was altered when the bricks were replaced in the wrong order. Nevertheless, Ascher and Margaret seem to be falling in love.

Because of the complexity, a two-page Perfect Crime answer sheet is available at the end of the performance.

== See also ==
- Long-running plays
