= The Magic Garden (TV series) =

Children's television series

- Hosts Paula Janis (left) and Carole Demas (right)
- Created by: Carole Demas; Paula Janis
- Starring: Carole Demas; Paula Janis
- Theme music composer: Carole Demas; Paula Janis
- Opening theme: “The Hello Song”
- Composers: Alton Alexander; George Kayatta
- Country of origin: United States (1972–1984)
- Original language: English
- No. of seasons: 12
- No. of episodes: 52 plus one holiday special

Production
- Production locations: WPIX studios, New York City
- Camera setup: multi-camera
- Running time: 30 minutes
- Production company: WPIX-TV

Original release
- Network: WPIX-11
- Release: March 6, 1972 – September 14, 1984

The Magic Garden is a live-action children's television program that aired Mondays through Thursdays from March 6, 1972, to September 14, 1984, on WPIX-11 in the New York City metropolitan area. Produced and broadcast in the world's largest television market, the show became popular with millions of children. As characterized by The New York Times, The Magic Garden "was a cheerful, low-budget, inadvertently psychedelic half-hour show in which Carol and Paula sat on giant toadstools, spoke to flowers, sang songs and told stories."

== Summary ==
Carole and Paula, the main characters and hosts of the show, sing several songs throughout each episode, often accompanied by Paula's acoustic guitar. The show takes place entirely within the Magic Garden, a colorful set that includes the Magic Tree, which lowers various objects from its branches. Also found throughout the garden are swings, a stone path, a shed, and the Chuckle Patch, a giggling bed of flowers that grows leaves with jokes on one side and the punch line on the other. Many conversations take place at a low stone wall with Sherlock (a mischievous squirrel puppet with a love for peanuts) and Flapper (a colorful bird who was a later addition to the characters in the garden). Stories are often acted out using costumes and props provided by the Story Box. In addition to songs, games, and jokes, the characters provide life lessons for viewers, and extend personal greetings to members of their television audience—for example: "Hello, Judy. Hello, Jeffrey."

The show aired on WPIX at various times during the day on weekdays, but only four days a week, from Monday through Thursday. At some points, it led out of morning cartoons, leading into religious programming. After 1975, it aired afternoons, leading out of religious and public affairs shows into the afternoon cartoons. On Fridays until October 1, 1982, in place of The Magic Garden, another children's show produced at WPIX called Joya's Fun School aired in its time slot. After that other children's shows would replace The Magic Garden in the Friday slot. Finally, WPIX dropped The Magic Garden altogether on September 14, 1984. WPIX wanted to be strictly entertainment programming during daytime hours and modernize its programming. In the year before, WPIX dropped The 700 Club and at the time it canceled The Magic Garden, the station ended its weekday non-commercial hour of public affairs programs as well.

== Development and reception ==
The hosts Carole Demas and Paula Janis, who had met as students at Brooklyn's Midwood High School, and later became New York City school teachers, helped to develop the show. In 1971, Demas (having worked in television and on the professional stage, and in rehearsal for her starring role in Grease on Broadway) was invited by WPIX to host an early-afternoon cartoon program. During the audition, Demas suggested an alternative idea. Asking Janis to come with her to a second audition, Demas and Janis presented a slower-paced show designed to avoid overstimulating young children's developing brains. After being hired, the two women spent the next year developing The Magic Garden, with the help of former Muppets puppeteer Cary Antebi, who created Sherlock. Many of the folk songs featured on the show came from material that Demas and Janis had created as schoolteachers.

52 half-hour episodes, a one-hour holiday special (which aired on December 13, 1981), and a one-hour retrospective The Magic Garden: Still Growing (2002) were produced. According to Carole and Paula's website, local ratings were equal to or exceeded those of other shows in its genre, such as Sesame Street. Three record albums were released due to high demand, one of which received a Grammy nomination. The program received citations from Actions for Children's Television and from the Children's Television Workshop for its creative efforts.

On Thanksgiving Day 2002, a special hosted by Carole and Paula aired on WPIX titled The Magic Garden: Still Growing, on which the duo reminisced about the show. This was followed by the broadcast of two episodes shown for the first time on the channel in 18 years. A DVD including ten episodes, as well as CDs, were released in 2008.

On December 13, 2013, WPIX announced via social media that The Magic Garden Christmas Special, which had not been seen since its broadcast 32 years before, had been "recently discovered...in a forgotten basement vault" and would be aired by the station on the following Christmas Day. After popular acclaim, WPIX has repeated the episode at Christmastime every year since.

Demas is married and appears on stage, television, film, concerts, and cabaret. Janis works in television and has three children. They continue to promote The Magic Garden by doing public appearances and live children's shows billed as Carole and Paula: Friends Forever. Demas and Janis are also working with the WPIX Archives department on a series of Magic Garden moments, recollections of the original series for publication on the archive's Facebook page.

== Credits ==
- Carole Demas – Carole (Star)
- Paula Janis – Paula (Star)
- Cary Antebi – Sherlock/Puppeteer
- Alton Alexander – Writer, Composer
- Virginia Martin – Writer, Associate Producer
- George Kayatta – Composer
- WPIX-TV – Producer

== Planned revival ==
An article in the November 8, 2021, issue of Licensing Magazine stated that Hot Spaghetti Productions was running a crowdfunding campaign for an animated version of the show, to be titled "The New Magic Garden"; it would star younger versions of all the characters, and it would feature the voices of Carole Demas and Paula Janis.

== In popular culture ==
The Robot Chicken episode "Slaughterhouse on the Prairie" (season 3, episode 13) includes a brief sketch titled "Raiders of the Magic Garden"; Carole and Paula open the Story Box, and out come ghosts and destructive energy (like those from the Ark of the Covenant in Raiders of the Lost Ark), killing the two women.
