= Ben Franklin in Paris =

- Original Cast Recording
- Music: Mark Sandrich, Jr. Jerry Herman
- Lyrics: Sidney Michaels
- Book: Sidney Michaels
- Productions: 1964 Broadway; 2008 San Francisco

Ben Franklin in Paris is a work of musical theatre, with a book and lyrics by Sidney Michaels, and music by Mark Sandrich, Jr. with two songs contributed by Jerry Herman.

== Premise ==
The story is a somewhat fictionalized account of Benjamin Franklin's adventures in the French capital. Seeking support for the Colonies' war against England, he arrives in Paris, where he enlists the aid of an old friend, Madame la Comtesse Diane de Vobrillac, a confidante to King Louis XVI. Franklin's hopes of winning the king's support seem dashed when British forces capture Philadelphia but rally when the Colonists are victorious at Saratoga. At home, his son William, the governor of New Jersey, sides with the enemy, and the traitorous act upsets the elder Franklin's plans. To regain the upper hand, he offers to marry Diane, but she rejects him. Knowing he faces death by hanging, Franklin nevertheless decides to go to England, hoping his act of martyrdom will win him posthumous support. Diane learns of the plan and intercedes with the King, who eventually welcomes Franklin in his new position of the ambassador of the United States to France.

== Production ==
After 13 previews, the Broadway production, directed and choreographed by Michael Kidd, opened on October 27, 1964 at the Lunt-Fontanne Theatre, where it closed on May 1, 1965 after 215 performances.

The musical had set designs by Oliver Smith, costume design by Motley, lighting design by John Brown, musical direction/vocal arrangements by Donald Pippin, orchestrations by Philip J. Lang, and dance music by Roger Adams.

The cast included Robert Preston (Benjamin Franklin), Ulla Sallert (Mademoiselle la Comtesse Diane de Vobrillac), Susan Watson (Janine Nicolet), Sam Greene (Captain Wickets), Franklin Kiser (Temple Franklin), Jerry Schaefer (Benjamin Franklin Bache), Anthony Falco (Footman), Oliver Clark (Louis XVI), Art Bartow (Vergennes), Clifford Fearl (Turgot), Roger LePage (British Grenadier), Byron Webster (David Lord Stormont), Ron Schwinn (French Soldiers), Bob Kaliban (Pierre Caron de Beaumarchais), John Taliaferro (Jacques Finque), Stuart Getz (Little Boy), Jack Fletcher (Pedro Count de Aranda), Herb Mazzini (Bookseller/Abbe de Morellet), Kip Andrews (Spanish Aide-de-Camp), Art Matthews (Spanish Soldier), Suzanne France (Spanish Ambassador's Daughter), and Lauren Jones (Yvonne). Watson was replaced by Rita Gardner soon after opening night. Michaels was nominated for a Tony Award for Best Author of a Musical.

An original cast recording was released by Capitol Records, which invested $200,000 in the production.

San Francisco's 42nd Street Moon theater company presented this musical in November/December 2008.

== Song list ==
Act I

- "We Sail the Seas"
- "I Invented Myself"
- "Too Charming" – music and lyrics by Jerry Herman
- "What Became of Old Temple"
- "Half the Battle"
- "A Balloon Is Ascending"
- "To Be Alone with You" – music and lyrics by Jerry Herman
- "You're in Paris"
- "How Laughable It Is"
- "Hic Haec Hoc"
- "God Bless the Human Elbow"

Act II

- "When I Dance with the Person I Love"
- "Diane Is"
- "Look for Small Pleasures"
- "I Love the Ladies"
- "To Be Alone with You"
- "Half the Battle" (Reprise)

== See also ==
- List of plays and musicals about the American Revolution
