= A Joyful Noise =

1966 musical

- Music: Oscar Brand; Paul Nassau
- Lyrics: Oscar Brand; Paul Nassau
- Book: Edward Padula
- Basis: Novel by Borden Deal; The Insolent Breed
- Productions: 1966 Broadway

A Joyful Noise is a musical with a script by Edward Padula and music and lyrics by Oscar Brand and Paul Nassau. The 1966 Broadway production was a flop but introduced choreographer Michael Bennett in his Broadway debut.

Based on Mississippi author Borden Deal's 1959 novel The Insolent Breed, the story centers on Shade Motley, a fiddler who arrives in a small Southern town and shocks the stern community with his exuberant love of hillbilly music and life in general.

== Background and production ==
The musical underwent significant changes, both in performers and creators, during the tryout period. The book, originally written by Edward Padula, was rewritten by Dore Schary, who took over as director. However, he quit, and Padula and Michael Bennett became co-directors.

Country music star Skeeter Davis was originally offered the ingenue lead, but with no prior acting experience was reluctant to begin a Broadway career in such a pivotal role and declined. The part was eventually played by Donna McKechnie, later replaced by Susan Watson. Mitzi Welch and James Rado were replaced by Karen Morrow and Clifford David. It had "laughably stilted dialogue" and "an unconvincing plot." John Raitt, who was to play Shade Motley, was aware of the show's problems, and, in an interview, he said that they "could never get by the New York critics."

The musical opened on Broadway at the Mark Hellinger Theatre on December 15, 1966 and closed on December 24, 1966 after 12 performances and four previews. Directed by Padula and choreographed by Michael Bennett, the cast featured John Raitt as Shade Motley, Karen Morrow, Susan Watson, Leland Palmer, Tommy Tune and Baayork Lee.

== Plot ==
A wandering minstrel, Shade Motley, arrives in a small Tennessee town with his fiddle under his arm. The young women of the town find the stranger attractive. One young woman in particular, Jenny Lee, falls immediately in love with him, although she is engaged to Brother Locke, the local minister. Shade gives Jenny a locket, but her father Walter Wishenant, tells him to leave town. Just then Bliss Stanley arrives, with an offer to make Shade rich through his singing.

Jenny Lee ends up marrying Brother Locke, and Shade goes off to make his fortune. He returns for a visit with Mary Texas, an extroverted blonde.

== Song list ==
Act I

- "Longtime Travelin'"—Shade Motley
- "A Joyful Noise"—Shade Motley and Townspeople
- "I'm Ready"—Jenny Lee, Miss Jimmie and The Girls
- "Spring Time of the Year"—Shade Motley
- "I Like to Look My Best"—Shade Motley, Sam Fredrickson and Saw Mill Boys
- "No Talent"—Bliss Stanley
- "Not Me"—Jenny Lee and Miss Jimmie
- "Until Today"—Shade Motley and Jenny Lee
- "Swinging a Dance"—Shade Motley and Company
- "To the Top"—Bliss Stanley and Shade Motley

Act II

- "I Love Nashville"—Mary Texas and Her Boys
- "Whither Thou Goest"—Brother Locke
- "We Won't Forget to Write"—Miss Jimmie, Sam Fredrickson and Saw Mill Boys
- "Ballad Maker"—Shade Motley, Mary Texas, The Motley Crew and Ensemble
- "Barefoot Gal"—Mary Texas
- "Clog Dance"—Dancing Ensemble
- "Fool's Gold"—Shade Motley, Mary Texas, The Motley Crew and Ensemble
- "The Big Guitar"—Bliss Stanley
- "Love Was"—Jenny Lee
- "I Say Yes"—Shade Motley, The Motley Crew and Ensemble
- "Lord, You Sure Know How to Make a New Day"—Shade Motley
- "A Joyful Noise (Reprise)"—Shade Motley and Townspeople

== Characters ==
- Shade Motley (John Raitt) as the wandering minstrel
- Jenny Lee (Susan Watson) as the local, young woman who becomes enamored with Shade
- Bliss Stanley (Swen Swenson) as an entrepreneur
- Brother Locke (Clifford David) as a minister and Jenny Lee's fiancé
- Miss Jimmie (Leland Palmer)
- Mary Texas (Karen Morrow) as Shade's flashy girlfriend
- Tommy (Tommy Tune) as one of the Saw Mill Boys and The Motley Crew

== Awards and nominations ==
Tony Award nominations went to Watson and Palmer as Best Featured Actress in a Musical and to Bennett for his choreography.
