= Leland Palmer (actress) =

American actress, dancer and singer (born 1945)

- Born: Linda Palmer; June 16, 1945 (age 81); Port Washington, New York
- Other name: Linda Posner
- Occupations: Actress; singer; dancer

Leland Palmer (born Linda Posner, June 16, 1940, in Port Washington, New York) is an American actress, dancer, and singer who has appeared on stage, in motion pictures, and on television. She appeared on Broadway in Bajour (1964), A Joyful Noise (1966) Hello, Dolly! (1967 replacement Minnie Fay), Applause (1970 replacement), and Pippin (1972). Palmer received two Tony Award nominations: in 1967 for featured actress in a musical (Miss Jimmie in A Joyful Noise), and in 1973 for actress in a musical (Fastrada in Pippin).

== Career ==
Palmer appeared as Viola in the rock musical Your Own Thing during a highly regarded run at the Huntington Hartford Theater in Los Angeles in August 1968, in the role that she originated in the original Off-Broadway production in 1968. She appeared in Dames at Sea which opened in September 1970 at the theater at Plaza 9 in New York City. She played the role of Ruby, with The New York Times reviewer writing: "Ruby... is played like a virtuous, squeaking mouse by a girl named Leland Palmer, who is delicious in a mildly frightening way." She appeared in the musical Double Feature at the Long Wharf Theatre, New Haven, Connecticut, which opened in November 1979. The show had music by Jeff Moss and was directed by Mike Nichols.

Her U.S. television appearances include guest roles on Love, American Style; Laverne & Shirley; and Rhoda. She was also a regular on Dinah Shore's summer variety television show, Dinah and Her New Best Friends in 1976. She played Aŕlene in the 1976 NBC television movie James Dean. Palmer is known for Bob Fosse's All That Jazz (1979), in which she played Audrey Paris, a character believed to be modeled on Fosse's wife, Gwen Verdon.

Palmer is known now as Linda Posner. She was born Linda Palmer, and discovered many years later that the family name was really "Posner." Although she no longer performs, she works with theaters in California. She taught acting classes at Mendocino Community College and was the artistic director, Director, Teacher, and Consultant for the Willits Community Theater (Willits, California). Pearl Marill, Posner's daughter who heads a dance company, presented a one-time event "My Mother on Broadway" in October 2014 in San Francisco. She served as choreographer of the 42nd Street Moon, San Francisco production of Irma La Douce in 2008.

== Filmography ==
=== Film ===
Year	Title	Role	Notes
1966	Step Out of Your Mind	Stacey	
1977	Valentino	Marjorie Tain	
1979	All That Jazz	Audrey Paris	

=== Television ===
Year	Title	Role	Notes
1967	Look Up and Live	Leland	Episode: Inner Feelings Outer Forms
1973	Love, American Style	Beverly	Episode: Love and the Playwright
1976	James Dean	Arlene	TV Movie
1976	Laverne & Shirley	Gloria Lubitz	Episode: From Suds to Stardom
1976	Rhoda	Kelly Fisk	Episode: An Elephant Never Forgets
1977	Police Story	Janice	Episode: Nightmare on a Sunday Morning
1977	There's Always Room	Valerie	TV Movie

=== Stage ===
Year	Title	Role	Notes
1967	Hello, Dolly!	Minnie Fay (Replacement)	St. James Theatre, Broadway
1964	Little Me	Nurse	National Tour
1964	Bajour	Dancer	Shubert Theatre, Broadway
1965	West Side Story	Ensemble	National Tour
1966	A Joyful Noise	Miss Jimmie	Mark Hellinger Theatre, Broadway
1966	The Pajama Game	Gladys	Celebrity Theatre
1968	Your Own Thing	Viola	Orpheum Theatre, Off-Broadway
1969	Your Own Thing	Viola	Comedy Theatre
1970	Dames at Sea	Ruby	Plaza 9 Music Hall, Off-Broadway
1970	Applause	Bonnie (Replacement)	Palace Theatre, Broadway
1971	Bloomer Girl	Daisy	Goodspeed Opera House
1972	Pippin	Fastrada	Imperial Theatre, Broadway
1974	Sugar	Sugar Kane	Dorothy Chandler Pavilion
1974	Sugar	Sugar Kane	Curran Theatre
1975	Irma La Douce	Irma La Douce	Coachlight Dinner Theatre
1979	Double Feature	Margaret	Long Wharf Theatre
