= Susan Watson =

American actress and singer (born 1938)

- Born: December 17, 1938 (age 87); Tulsa, Oklahoma
- Education: Juilliard School
- Occupations: Actress, singer
- Years active: 1958–present
- Spouse: Norton Wright
- Children: 2

Susan Watson (born December 17, 1938) is an American actress and singer best known for her roles in musical theatre.

Watson's first professional role was Velma in the original West End production of West Side Story in 1958. She created the role of Luisa in The Fantasticks and then played Kim on Broadway in Bye Bye Birdie, beginning in 1960. Among many other roles in musicals, she was nominated for a Tony Award for the role of Jenny in A Joyful Noise (1966). She starred in the title role of the Broadway revival of No, No Nanette in 1971. Watson also appeared in several television series and specials.

== Biography ==
Born in Tulsa, Oklahoma, Watson was one of five children of a geologist/geophysicist and a dance instructor. From an early age, her life was filled with the music of Gilbert and Sullivan and Rodgers and Hammerstein. As a teenager, she performed in summer stock before being accepted at the Juilliard School in Manhattan.

Her studies there were interrupted when she accepted a role as Velma and understudy for Maria in the original West End production of West Side Story in 1958.

Stopping in Paris after the show's run, Watson met her sister, Janet, who was dating Tom Jones and urged Watson to contact him when she arrived in New York City. Jones and Harvey Schmidt cast her in the lead role of Louisa, "The Girl", in their one-act musical The Fantasticks, which ran for one week in 1959, at Barnard College's Minor Latham Playhouse, while the creative team tried to raise financing for an off-Broadway production.

Watson appeared in a revue entitled Follies of 1910. Gower Champion, who was in the process of casting Bye Bye Birdie, noticed Watson in Follies and offered her a role. She played the role of Kim throughout the entire Broadway run (April 1960 – October 1961). She finally returned to The Fantasticks when it was televised by the Hallmark Hall of Fame in 1964.

Following a national tour of Carnival, Watson returned to New York to play opposite Robert Preston in Ben Franklin in Paris (1964), a Lincoln Center revival of Carousel (1965) as Carrie with John Raitt and Jerry Orbach, a New York City Center staging of Where's Charley?, and Jenny in the short-lived musical A Joyful Noise (1966) (again with Raitt), for which she was nominated for a Tony Award for Best Performance by a Featured Actress in a Musical.

Watson reunited with Jones and Schmidt for their musical Celebration, which opened on Broadway in January 1969 at the Ambassador Theatre and played in Beggar on Horseback (1970) in repertory at the Vivian Beaumont Theater at Lincoln Center before taking on the title role in the Broadway revival of No, No Nanette (1971) with Ruby Keeler.

She appeared at the William Inge Theatre Festival in Independence, Kansas, in a tribute to Jones and Schmidt on April 25, 2009.

== Later years ==
Watson's television credits include several episodes of the Bell Telephone Hour (1964–1966) and guest appearances on the television series Newhart (1982), St. Elsewhere (1984), Wings (1993), and the soap opera General Hospital (1987). She also made an appearance on Sesame Street as Laura, Gordon’s friend in episode 0264. She is one of dozens of Broadway musical performers in the documentary Broadway: Beyond the Golden Age, which was scheduled for broadcast on PBS in 2010. Watson is a founding member of the Musical Theatre Guild, a group of professionals who perform musicals at the Pasadena Playhouse, California.

She was back on Broadway for the first time in many years in 2011. Watson performed the featured role of Emily Whitman in the revival of Follies, which ran from August 2011 to January 2012 at the Marquis Theatre. She sang "Rain on the Roof" with Don Correia. Watson also performed in the run at the Kennedy Center in May to June 2011.

In 2016, she released an album of 14 Broadway and jazz standards, titled The Music Never Ends.

== Family ==
Watson and her husband, producer Norton Wright, live in Sherman Oaks, California. They are the parents of two adult sons.

== Filmography ==
=== Film ===
| Year | Title | Role |
|---|---|---|
| 1981 | Lovely But Deadly | Lovely's Mother |

=== Television ===
| Year | Title | Role | Notes |
|---|---|---|---|
| 1963 | The Many Loves of Dobie Gillis | Nancy Sue Burkhart | Episode: Beauty is Only Kin Deep |
| 1963 | Vacation Playhouse | Jeannie Brown | Episode: Maggie Brown |
| 1963 | Maggie Brown | Jeannie Brown | Television Movie |
| 1964 | The Fantasticks | Luisa | Television Movie |
| 1970 | The Front Page | Peggy Grant | Television Movie |
| 1970 | Medical Center | Coed | Episode: The Clash |
| 1978 | General Hospital | Susan Jamison, R.N. | Episode: 1.4001 |
| 1982 | Newhart | Mrs. Carlson | Episode: This Probably is Condemned |
| 1983 | Dallas | Nurse | Episode: The Road Back |
| 1984 | St. Elsewhere | Mrs. McClean | Episode: Drama Center |
| 1984 | Emerald Point N.A.S. | Jenny Mallory | 2 Episodes |
| 1984 | His Mistress | Saleswoman | Television Movie |
| 1987 | The Betty Ford Story | Louise Abbruzzese | Television Movie |
| 1993 | Wings | Passenger | Episode: Stop in the Name of Love |
| 1994 | Attack of the 5 Ft. 2 Women | Nancy's Mother | Television Movie |
| 1995 | Murderous Intent | Charge Nurse | Television Movie |

=== Stage ===
| Year | Title | Role | Notes |
|---|---|---|---|
| 1958 | West Side Story | Velma | Her Majesty’s Theatre |
| 1960 | Bye Bye Birdie | Kim MacAfee | Martin Beck Theatre, Broadway |
| 1961 | Carnival! | Lili (Replacement) | Imperial Theatre, Broadway |
| 1962 | Carnival! | Lili | National Tour |
| 1963 | Gypsy | Louise Hovick | The Muny |
| 1964 | Ben Franklin in Paris | Janine Nicolet | Lunt-Fontanne Theatre, Broadway |
| 1965 | Oklahoma! | Laurey | New York City Center, Off-Brodaway |
| 1966 | A Joyful Noise | Jenny Lee | Mark Hellinger Theatre, Broadway |
| 1967 | The Music Man | Marian Paroo | Houston Music Theatre |
| 1968 | Brigadoon | Fiona MacLaren | Starlight Theatre |
| 1969 | Celebration | Angel | Ambassador Theatre, Broadway |
| 1970 | Beggar on Horseback | Cynthia Mason | Vivian Beaumont Theater, Broadway |
| 1971 | No, No, Nanette | Nanette | 46th Street Theatre, Broadway |
| 1972 | Promises, Promises | Fran Kubelik | Meadowbrook Dinner Theatre |
| 1973 | Promises, Promises | Fran Kubelik | Melody Top Theatre |
| 1973 | The Music Man | Marian Paroo | Melody Top Theatre |
| 1974 | The Music Man | Marian Paroo | Paper Mill Playhouse |
| 1975 | The Rivals | Julia | Roundabout Theatre Company, Off-Broadway |
| 1976 | The Wizard of Oz | Dorothy Gale | Music Hall at Fair Park |
| 1977 | The Sound of Music | Maria Rainer | Tulsa Performing Arts Center |
| 1980 | Front Street Gaieties | Performer | Mayfair Music Hall |
| 1980 | My Fair Lady | Eliza Doolittle | Westport Country Playhouse |
| 1980 | My Fair Lady | Eliza Doolittle | North Shore Music Theatre |
| 1982 | Tintypes | Performer | South Coast Repertory |
| 1983 | Seven Brides for Seven Brothers | Milly Bradon | Casa Mañana Theatre |
| 1983 | The Music Man | Marian Paroo | Broadway Sacramento |
| 1987 | The Sound of Music | Maria Rainer | San Jose Center for the Performing Arts |
| 1988 | The Wizard of Oz | Auntie Em/Glinda | Terrace Theater |
| 1991 | The Music Man | Marian Paroo | Broadway Sacramento |
| 1993 | Into the Woods | Cinderella's Mother/Granny/The Giant | Long Beach Civic Light Opera |
| 1999 | I Remember Mama | Aunt Trina | Pasadena Playhouse |
| 1999 | Nine | Guido's Mother | Pasadena Playhouse |
| 2000 | Take Me Along | Essie Miller | Pasadena Playhouse |
| 2000 | Rags | Morris' Mother | Pasadena Playhouse |
| 2001 | Where's Charley? | Donna Lucia D'Alvadorez | Pasadena Playhouse |
| 2002 | Allegro | Grandma Muriel Taylor | Alex Theatre |
| 2003 | Parade | Nurse | Alex Theatre |
| 2003 | Dear World | Gabrielle | Alex Theatre |
| 2011 | Follies | Emily Whitman | Marquis Theatre, Broadway |
