= Warren Manzi =

American playwright

Warren Michael Manzi (July 1, 1955 – February 11, 2016) was an American playwright and actor, who was best known for the play Perfect Crime, the longest running play in New York City's history.

== Early life ==
Manzi was born in Manchester, New Hampshire, to a single mother of Italian descent. His family later moved to Lawrence, Massachusetts, where he attended Holy Rosary School and Central Catholic High School. He graduated from the College of the Holy Cross and obtained a master's degree from the Yale School of Drama.

== Career ==
Manzi wrote Perfect Crime in 1980 at age 25, while an understudy for a role in Amadeus on Broadway. Early reviews of Perfect Crime described it as confusing, and Manzi continually rewrote the play throughout the rest of his life. Perfect Crime opened in New York City on April 18, 1987 and was performed over 11,800 times throughout Manzi's lifetime, becoming the longest running play in city theatre history. Manzi also wrote One for the Money and The Queen of the Parting Shot.

As an actor, Manzi appeared in the films The Manhattan Project (1986) and Nuts (1987).

== Personal life ==
He was married to Ellen Margaret Michelin from 1995 to 1996, when she died of kidney failure.

Manzi died of pneumonia aged 60 in 2016, in Lawrence, Massachusetts.
