= The Fantasticks =

Musical by Harvey Schmidt and Tom Jones

- Original Off-Broadway cast album cover
- Music: Harvey Schmidt
- Lyrics: Tom Jones
- Book: Tom Jones
- Basis: Les Romanesques by Edmond Rostand
- Productions: 1960 Off-Broadway; 1961 West End; 2006 Off-Broadway revival; 2010 West End revival; 2014 US Tour; 2026 Broadway

The Fantasticks is a musical with music by Harvey Schmidt and lyrics and a book by Tom Jones, loosely based on the 1894 play Les Romanesques by Edmond Rostand. It tells an allegorical story concerning two neighboring parents who employ reverse psychology to get their children to fall in love by pretending to feud.

The show's original off-Broadway production ran a total of 42 years (until 2002) and 17,162 performances, making it the world's longest-running musical. The musical was produced by Lore Noto. It was awarded Tony Honors for Excellence in Theatre in 1992. The poetic book and breezy, inventive score, including such memorable songs as "Try to Remember", helped make the show durable. Many productions followed, as well as television and film versions. The Fantasticks became a staple of regional, community and high school productions since its premiere.

The show was revived off Broadway from 2006 to 2017. As of 2010, its original investors had earned 240 times their original investments. The first Broadway production began in October 2026. The musical has played in all 50 US states and in at least 67 foreign countries.

== Background ==
The 1954 Marc Blitzstein adaptation of The Threepenny Opera, which ran for six years, showed that musicals could be profitable off-Broadway in a small-scale, small orchestra format. This was confirmed in 1959 when a revival of Jerome Kern and P. G. Wodehouse's Leave It to Jane ran for more than two years. The 1959–1960 off-Broadway season included a dozen musicals and revues including Little Mary Sunshine, The Fantasticks, and Ernest in Love, a musicalization of Oscar Wilde's 1895 hit The Importance of Being Earnest.

The musical is based loosely on The Romancers (Les Romanesques) by Edmond Rostand, which draws elements from the story of Pyramus and Thisbe, Shakespeare's Romeo and Juliet and A Midsummer Night's Dream, and Donizetti's L'elisir d'amore.

== Productions ==
The Fantasticks is one of the most widely produced musicals in the world, and by 2010 had been staged in all 50 states, and across 67 countries with many translations. It has been performed at The White House, for the Peace Corps in Africa, at the Shawnee Methodist Mission in Kansas, the Menninger Foundation, Yellowstone National Park, and the White Sands Missile Range. It was performed in Mandarin by the Peking Opera, and in 1990 under the auspices of the United States State Department it played for the first time in Russia. Notable cast members have included David Canary, Robert Goulet, Richard Chamberlain, John Carradine, and Ed Ames. According to articles in 2011 and 2018, approximately 250 new productions of the musical were occurring each year.

=== Early productions ===
Jones, together with John Donald Robb of the University of New Mexico, first adapted the Rostand play as a Western titled Joy Comes to Deadhorse. The play premiered at the University of New Mexico in the spring of 1956. It was set in the American West and featured a "half-breed Apache" among the characters. Jones was not happy with this version and subsequently teamed with Schmidt.

The script was substantially rewritten by Jones and Schmidt, with the character of Mortimer now "not really an Indian" but playing one during the "Rape Ballet" sequence. The Wild West setting was abandoned, as was most of the script. All but a few songs in the score were also jettisoned, and the staging of the play was changed to a thrust stage. Tom Jones says that the name of the play came from George Fleming's 1900 adaptation of the Rostand play, which used the name The Fantasticks. Harley Granville-Barker's book, On Dramatic Method, provided the idea of using a series of images to help weave a unifying theme to the play. Thornton Wilder's Our Town gave Jones the idea of using a narrator, the staging of Carlo Goldoni's Servant of Two Masters provided the concept of having actors sit stage-side when not acting, and John Houseman's production of The Winter's Tale and Leonard Bernstein's Candide suggested the use of sun, moon, frozen action, and incidental music. The song "Try to Remember" was added at this time. Harvey Schmidt says he wrote it in a single afternoon, after it emerged in almost complete form after a fruitless afternoon attempting to compose other songs.

The revamped play appeared on a bill of new one-act plays at Barnard College for one week in August 1959.

=== Original off-Broadway ===
The Fantasticks premiered at the Sullivan Street Playhouse, a small off-Broadway theatre in New York City's Greenwich Village, on May 3, 1960, with Jerry Orbach as El Gallo, Rita Gardner as Luisa, Kenneth Nelson as Matt, and librettist Tom Jones (under a pseudonym) as the Old Actor, among the cast members. The sparse set and semicircular stage created an intimate and immediate effect. The play is highly stylized and combines old-fashioned showmanship, classic musical theatre, commedia dell'arte and Noh theatrical traditions. The original production was directed by Word Baker and was produced on a very low budget. The producer spent $900 on the set and $541 on costumes, at a time when major Broadway shows would cost $250,000. The original set designer, costumer, prop master, and lighting designer was Ed Wittstein, who performed all four jobs for a total of only $480 plus $24.48 a week. The set was similar to that for Our Town; Wittstein designed a raised stationary platform anchored by six poles. It resembled a traveling players' wagon, like a pageant wagon. For a curtain, he hung various small false curtains across the platform at various times during the play. He also made a sun/moon out of cardboard. One side was painted bright yellow (the sun) and the other was black with a crescent of white (the moon). The sun/moon was hung from a nail in one of the poles and is referred to in the libretto. The orchestra consists of a piano and sometimes also a harp, with the harpist also sometimes playing some percussion instruments.

The opening of The Fantasticks met with mixed reviews. Four years later, in The New York Times, Schmidt and Jones recalled that Noto had kept the show running despite the criticism. The musical was awarded the Tony Honors for Excellence in Theatre in 1992.

The production closed on January 13, 2002, after 17,162 performances. It is the world's longest-running musical and the longest-running uninterrupted show of any kind in the United States. Other notable actors who appeared in the off-Broadway and touring production throughout its long run included Liza Minnelli, Elliott Gould, F. Murray Abraham, Glenn Close, Keith Charles, Carole Demas, Kristin Chenoweth, Bert Convy, Eileen Fulton, Lore Noto (the show's longtime producer), Dick Latessa, and Martin Vidnovic.

=== London and Vietnam ===
The musical ran at London's Apollo Theatre from September 7, 1961, and ran for 44 performances. In 1990, another production was given in London's Regent's Park at the Open Air Theatre there.

It toured in Vietnam in 1969–70, presented by the Command Military Touring Shows, a unit of Army Special Entertainment branch of the US Army Special Services. The company was made up of military personnel.

=== Off-Broadway revival ===
On August 23, 2006, a revival of The Fantasticks opened at the off-Broadway The Theater Center, New York City where it closed on June 4, 2017 after an additional run of 4,390 performances. It was directed by lyricist Jones, who also appeared in the role of Henry, The Old Actor, under the stage name Thomas Bruce. The original cast of the revival also included Burke Moses (El Gallo), Leo Burmester (Hucklebee), Martin Vidnovic (Bellomy), Santino Fontana (Matt), Sara Jean Ford (Luisa), Robert R. Oliver (Mortimer), and Douglas Ullman, Jr. (the Mute). A cast recording of this production was released by Ghostlight Records.

Anthony Fedorov played the role of Matt in 2007. Margaret Anne Florence played Luisa in 2008. Lewis Cleale played El Gallo between 2008 and 2010. Jones left the cast in 2010, after the musical had celebrated its 50th anniversary. Pop star Aaron Carter joined the cast as Matt in 2011. In memory of the original El Gallo, the theatre hosting the revival was renamed the Jerry Orbach Theater.

=== Washington, D.C. ===
Arena Stage in Washington, D.C. presented the musical from November 20, 2009, to January 10, 2010, at the Lincoln Theatre. The well-received production replaced the conventional "mysterious bandit" interpretation of El Gallo with a kindly carnival magician character. Washington Post theatre critic Peter Marks wrote, "they have been reconditioned to conceal the telltale signs of age and yield a diversion that feels fresh and alive again".

=== 2010 West End ===
The Fantasticks played briefly in London's West End at the Duchess Theatre, opening on June 9, 2010, following previews from May 24, 2010. The production was directed by Amon Miyamoto, designed by Rumi Matsui with lighting by Rick Fisher, and starred Hadley Fraser as El Gallo, Lorna Want as Luisa, Luke Brady as Matt, Clive Rowe and David Burt as the fathers, Edward Petherbridge as the Old Actor, Paul Hunter as Henry and Carl Au as the mime. The production received mixed to poor reviews: Michael Billington wrote in the Guardian, "the time for this kind of faux-naïf, sub Commedia dell'Arte diversion has passed", while Paul Tayolr, in The Independent, felt that, while "ingratiating [and overly long,] as an open-hearted antidote to soulless, big-budget hi-tech, The Fantasticks continues to prove that small can be quite fetching". The production closed on June 26, 2010, two and a half weeks into its run.

=== 2014 US national tour ===
A non-equity US national tour, in a steampunk-inspired version, began at the Rushmore Plaza Civic Center on January 17, 2014.

=== 2026 Broadway ===
Jones adapted the musical for the 2022 Flint Repertory Theatre in Flint, Michigan, collaborating with director Michael Lluberes to reflect LGBT themes. The revisions changed the female lead (Luisa) to the male character Lewis and both parents to mother characters.

Second Stage Theater produced the musical's first Broadway production at the Hayes Theater using the revised book and lyrics premiered at Flint Repertory Theatre. Christopher Gattelli directed and choreographed; previews began on October 22, 2026, ahead of a November 16 opening. Designers included Jason Sherwood (sets), Linda Cho (costumes), Jen Schriever (lighting), and Nevin Steinberg (sound), with orchestrations by Sam Davis for eight instruments. The cast includes Maxim Chlumecky as Matt, Nathan Levy as Lewis, Zane Phillips as El Gallo, Leslie Rodriguez Kritzer as Mildred Hucklebee, Ruthie Ann Miles as Bessie Mae Bellomy, David Patrick Kelly as Henry, Kevin Del Aguila as Mortimer and Ahmad Simmons as The Mute. Reviews were positive to mixed, with critics writing that the musical's quaint, tender and nostalgic innocence and charm are still "shimmering", calling the production "joyous" and generally praising the gender-swapped version, the cast and orchestrations, though one thought the romance "tepid".

== Plot ==
=== Act I ===
Two houses are separated by a wall (portrayed by a mute actor) in an unspecified American town.

A mysterious bandit, El Gallo, tells about the kind of September "when love was an ember about to billow" ("Try to Remember"). He begins to narrate the plot of the play. Two young people, Matt and Luisa, live next door to each other and fall in love. However, their fathers are feuding and order them not to speak to each other. Luisa fantasizes about the experiences she wants to have in her life ("Much More"). Matt then delivers a speech about his love for Luisa, calling over the wall to her in a mock literary/heroic way ("Metaphor"). Matt and Luisa climb to the top of the wall and speak secretly of Luisa's romantic vision of Matt saving her from kidnapping. Matt's father, Mr. Hucklebee, then appears and tells about his philosophy of life and gardening (don't over-water). He orders Matt to go inside the house. Luisa's father, Mr. Bellomy, arrives and gives a contrasting philosophy of life and gardening (plenty of water). He orders Luisa inside. He then calls to Hucklebee, and the two old friends boast about their cleverness in pretending to feud as a means to ensure that their children fall in love. They note that to manipulate children you need merely to say "no" ("Never Say No"). Hucklebee tells Bellomy of his plan to end the feud by having Luisa "kidnapped" by a professional abductor so that Matt can "rescue" her and appear heroic.

The hired professional, El Gallo, appears and offers the fathers a menu of different varieties of "rape" – in the literary sense of an abduction or kidnapping – that he can simulate ("It Depends on What You Pay"). Deciding to spare no expense for their beloved children (within reason), the fathers agree to a "first class" abduction scene. A disheveled old actor with a failing memory, Henry Albertson, arrives with his sidekick, Mortimer, a Cockney dressed as an American Indian. El Gallo engages them to help with the staged kidnapping. Matt and Luisa return to speak of their love and hint at physical intimacy ("Soon It's Gonna Rain"). El Gallo and the actors burst in and carry out the moonlit abduction scenario; Matt "defeats" the three ("Rape Ballet"). The feud is ended and the wall between the houses torn down, with the children and the fathers joined in a picturesque final tableau ("Happy Ending"). El Gallo collects the stage properties used in the "abduction" and wonders aloud how long the lovers and their fathers will be able to maintain their elaborately joyful poses. He and The Mute leave.

=== Act II ===
The children and fathers are discovered in the same poses but are visibly exhausted by the effort. El Gallo observes that what seemed romantic by moonlight may lose its charm when exposed to the harsh light of day. He exchanges his moon for a blazing sun. The fathers and lovers begin to complain about one another, noticing all the flaws that have become glaringly visible by daylight ("This Plum Is Too Ripe"). The children try to recreate their romantic mood from the previous night and mock their fathers. Eventually, in a fit of pique, Hucklebee reveals that the kidnapping and the feud were fake. Matt and Luisa are mortified, and the fathers' mutual recrimination quickly escalates into a real feud; they storm off to their respective houses. Matt sees El Gallo and, in a desperate attempt to regain his honor and Luisa's love, challenges him to a duel. El Gallo easily disarms Matt and leaves him embarrassed. Matt and Luisa then argue; she calls him a poseur, while he calls her childish.

Matt is eager to leave the provincial town. He and El Gallo discuss his gleaming vision of adventure ("I Can See It"). Henry and Mortimer return and lead Matt off to see the world. A month passes, and the fathers have rebuilt the wall. They meet and speak sadly of their children; Luisa is like a statue and does nothing but sit and dream; Matt still hasn't returned. They then sing about the uncertainties of raising children, as compared with the reliability of vegetable gardening ("Plant a Radish"). Luisa sees El Gallo watching her and is intrigued by the handsome, experienced bandit. Impulsively, she asks him to take her away to see the world. In a long fantasy sequence, they preview a series of romantic adventures through a mask of unreality, while in the background Matt is being abused and beaten by Henry and Mortimer portraying a series of unpleasant exotic employers. Luisa's fantasies become increasingly frenzied, exhausting and darkly underscored ("Round and Round").

El Gallo tells Luisa to pack her things for the journey, but before she goes inside to do so, he asks her to give him her treasured necklace, a relic of her dead mother, as a pledge that she will return. As she goes inside, El Gallo promises her a world of beauty and grandeur; at the same time, Matt approaches, giving a contrasting version of the cruel experiences that one can suffer ("I Can See It" (reprise)). As Luisa disappears, El Gallo turns to leave, the injured Matt makes a pitiful attempt to stop him from hurting Luisa, but El Gallo knocks him away and disappears. Luisa returns to find that El Gallo has left with her necklace, and she sits in tears. El Gallo, as the narrator, explains poetically that he had to hurt Matt and Luisa, and also himself in the process. Matt comforts Luisa, and he tells her a little about his experiences, and the two realize that everything they wanted was each other ("They Were You"; "Metaphor" (reprise)), but that they now understand that more deeply. The Fathers return joyfully and are about to tear down the wall, when El Gallo reminds them that the wall must always remain ("Try to Remember" (reprise)).

== Casts ==
Character	Barnard College (1959)	Off-Broadway (1960)	West End (1961)	TV special (1964)	Film (1995)	Off-Broadway revival (2006)	West End revival (2010)	Broadway (2026)
El Gallo (the Narrator/Bandit)	Jonathan Farwell	Jerry Orbach	Terence Cooper	Ricardo Montalbán	Jonathon Morris	Burke Moses	Hadley Fraser	Zane Phillips
Matt (the Boy)	Crayton Rowe	Kenneth Nelson	Peter Gilmore	John Davidson	Joey McIntyre	Santino Fontana	Luke Brady	Maxim Chlumecky
Luisa (the Girl)	Susan Watson	Rita Gardner	Stephanie Voss	Susan Watson	Jean Louisa Kelly	Sara Jean Ford	Lorna Want	Nathan Levy (as Lewis)
Hucklebee (the Boy's father)	Ron Leibman	William Larsen	Timothy Bateson	Bert Lahr	Brad Sullivan	Leo Burmester	Clive Rowe	Leslie Rodriguez Kritzer (as Mildred Hucklebee, Matt's mom)
Bellomy (the Girl's father)	Lee Croghan	Hugh Thomas	David Bauer	Stanley Holloway	Joel Grey	Martin Vidnovic	David Burt	Ruthie Ann Miles (as Bessie Mae Bellomy, Lewis's mom)
Henry (the Old Actor)	Dick Burnham	Thomas Bruce	John Wood	—N/a	Barnard Hughes	Thomas Bruce	Edward Petherbridge	David Patrick Kelly
Mortimer (the man who dies)	Bill Tost	George Curley	David Suchet	—N/a	Teller	Robert Oliver	Paul Hunter	Kevin Del Aguila
The Mute (who at times acts the part of the Wall)	George Morgan	Richard Stauffer	John Gower	—N/a	—N/a	Douglas Ullman Jr.	Carl Au	Ahmad Simmons

== Musical numbers ==
=== Act I ===
- Overture
- "Try to Remember" – El Gallo, Luisa, Matt, Hucklebee, Bellomy
- "Much More" – Luisa
- "Metaphor" – Matt, Luisa
- "Never Say No" – Hucklebee, Bellomy
- "It Depends On What You Pay" – El Gallo, Hucklebee, Bellomy
- "Soon It's Gonna Rain" – Matt, Luisa
- "Rape Ballet" (or, with an option offered later, "Abduction Ballet") – Company
- "Happy Ending" – Company

=== Act II ===
- "This Plum Is Too Ripe" – Matt, Luisa, Hucklebee, Bellomy
- "I Can See It" – Matt, El Gallo
- "Plant a Radish" – Bellomy, Hucklebee
- "Round and Round" – El Gallo, Luisa, Company
- "They Were You" – Matt, Luisa
- "Try to Remember" (reprise) – El Gallo

== Use of the word "rape" ==
After the initial success of the musical, The Fantasticks came under criticism for the repeated use of the word "rape" in the scene preceding the song "It Depends on What You Pay" and in the lyrics of the song. In the original production, when El Gallo offers to stage the phony kidnapping of Luisa, he refers to the proposed event as a "rape", although he states that he uses the word in its literary sense of "abduction", noting that classical works such as Alexander Pope's The Rape of the Lock use the word in this sense. (See raptio and bride kidnapping.) In his song "It Depends on What You Pay" he describes different kidnapping scenarios, some comic or outlandish, that he classifies as the "Venetian rape", the "Gothic rape", the "Drunken rape", etc. However, as women’s rights advocates began drawing attention to rape and sexual assault in the US during the play's long run, many audience members objected to the repeated use of the word, arguing that it minimizes the damage to women and families caused by sexual crimes.

To deal with changing audience perceptions, the musical's book is usually edited to replace the word "rape", in most instances, with alternatives such as "abduction" and the similar-sounding "raid". In 1990, Jones and Schmidt wrote an optional replacement piece called "Abductions", which uses the music of the "Rape Ballet", which they hoped would replace the song "It Depends on What You Pay". The song was not replaced at the Sullivan Street Playhouse, however, where the producer resisted the change, and, with the edits made in the book, audiences accepted the song. An edited version of "It Depends on What You Pay" was used in the long-running Jerry Orbach Theater version of the show. MTI (Music Theater International), which licenses the show, offers "Abductions" as an alternative choice.

== Adaptations ==
An abbreviated version of the show was broadcast by the Hallmark Hall of Fame on October 18, 1964. The cast included John Davidson, Stanley Holloway, Bert Lahr, Ricardo Montalbán and Susan Watson, who had appeared in the original Barnard College production. The roles of the old actor and Mortimer were cut for time, and some of their lines were assigned to the fathers, who indulged in some "amateur theatrics".

A feature film directed by Michael Ritchie was completed in 1995 but not released until 2000. It starred Joel Grey, Brad Sullivan, Jean Louisa Kelly, Barnard Hughes, Jonathon Morris and Joey McIntyre and included some changes to the book. It was both a critical and box office failure.
