= Off-Broadway =

Type of theatre in New York City

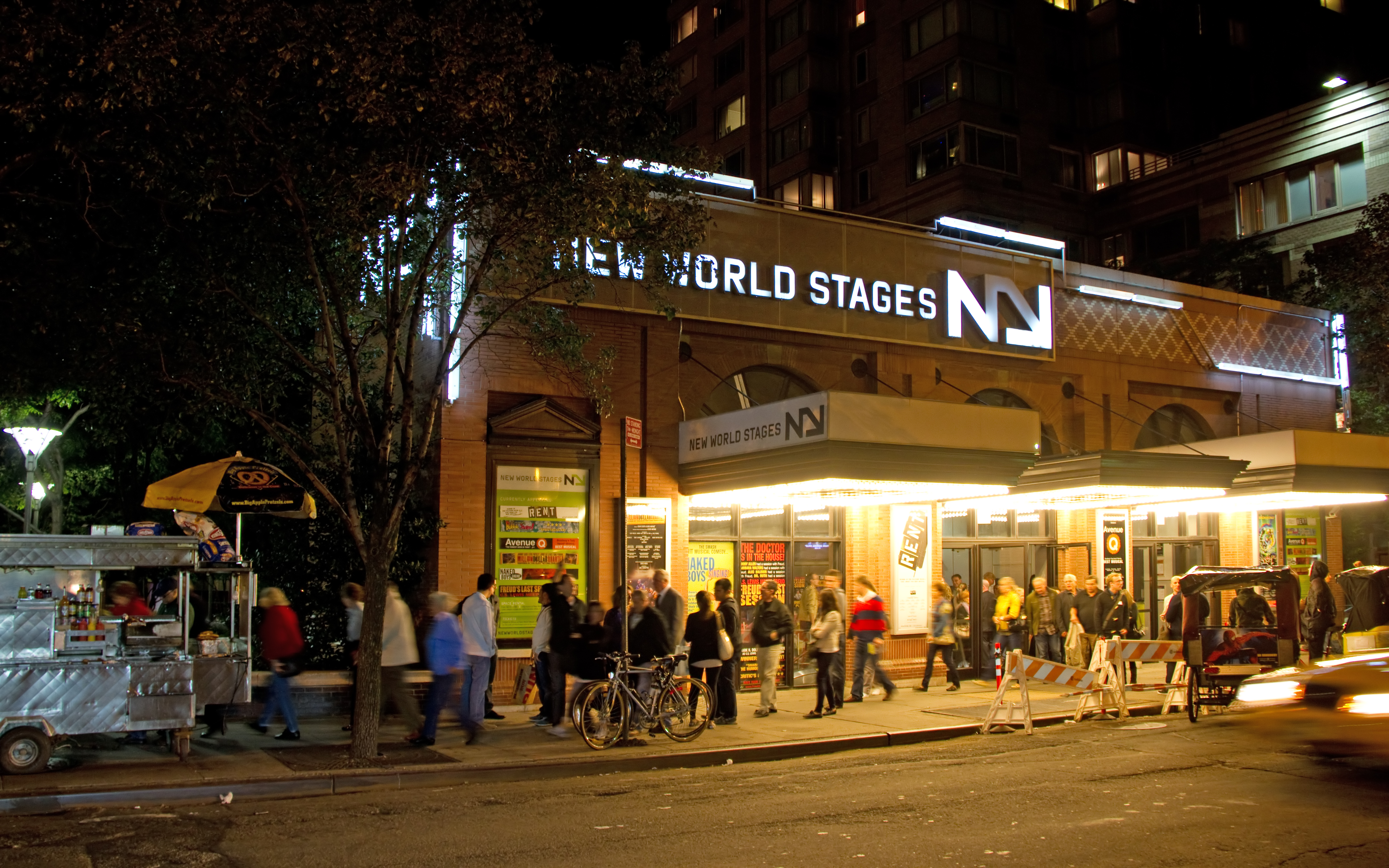
New World Stages, an off-Broadway theatre complex in Hell's Kitchen, Manhattan

An off-Broadway theatre is any professional theatre venue in New York City with a seating capacity between 100 and 499, inclusive. These theatres are smaller than Broadway theatres, but larger than off-off-Broadway theatres, which seat fewer than 100.

An "off-Broadway production" is a production of a play, musical, or revue that appears in such a venue and adheres to related trade union and other contracts. Some shows that premiere off-Broadway are subsequently produced on Broadway.

== History ==
The term originally referred to any venue, and its productions, on a street intersecting Broadway in Midtown Manhattan's Theater District, the hub of the American theatre industry. It later became defined by the League of Off-Broadway Theatres and Producers as a professional venue in Manhattan with a seating capacity of at least 100, but not more than 499, or a production that appears in such a venue and adheres to related trade union and other contracts.

Previously, regardless of the size of the venue, a theatre was considered a Broadway (rather than off-Broadway) house if it was within the "Broadway Box", extending from 40th Street north to 54th Street and from Sixth Avenue west to Eighth Avenue, including Times Square and West 42nd Street. This change to the contractual definition of "off-Broadway" benefited theatres satisfying the 499-seat criterion because of the lower minimum required salary for Actors' Equity performers at off-Broadway theatres as compared with the salary requirements of the union for Broadway theatres. The adoption of the 499-seat criterion occurred after a one-day strike in January 1974. Examples of off-Broadway theatres within the Broadway Box are the Laura Pels Theatre and The Theater Center.

The off-Broadway movement started in the 1950s as a reaction to the perceived commercialism of Broadway and provided less expensive venues for shows that have often employed future Broadway artists. An early success was Circle in the Square Theatre's 1952 production of Summer and Smoke by Tennessee Williams. According to theatre historians Ken Bloom and Frank Vlastnik, off-Broadway offered a new outlet for "poets, playwrights, actors, songwriters, and designers. ... The first great Off-Broadway musical was the 1954 revival" of The Threepenny Opera, which proved that off-Broadway productions could be financially successful. Critic John Gassner argued at the time, however, that "Broadway is just as eclectic – and just as footless – as 'Off-Broadway'." Theatre Row, on West 42nd Street between 9th and 10th Avenues in Manhattan, is a concentration of off-Broadway and off-off-Broadway theatres. It was developed in the mid-1970s and modernized in 2002.

Many off-Broadway shows have had subsequent runs on Broadway, including such musicals as Hair, Godspell, Little Shop of Horrors, Sunday in the Park with George, Rent, Grey Gardens, Urinetown, Avenue Q, The 25th Annual Putnam County Spelling Bee, Rock of Ages, In the Heights, Spring Awakening, Next to Normal, Hedwig and the Angry Inch, Fun Home, Hamilton, Dear Evan Hansen, Hadestown, and Kimberly Akimbo. In particular, two that became Broadway hits, Grease and A Chorus Line, encouraged other producers to premiere their shows off-Broadway. Plays that have moved from off-Broadway houses to Broadway include Doubt, I Am My Own Wife, Bridge & Tunnel, The Normal Heart, Oh, Mary!, and Coastal Disturbances. Other productions, such as Stomp, Blue Man Group, Altar Boyz, Perfect Crime, Forbidden Broadway, Nunsense, Naked Boys Singing, Bat Boy: The Musical, and I Love You, You're Perfect, Now Change have had runs of many years off-Broadway, never moving to Broadway. The Fantasticks, the longest-running musical in theatre history, spent its original 42-year run off-Broadway from 1960 to 2002 and had another off-Broadway run from 2006 to 2017.

== Awards ==
Off-Broadway shows, performers, and creative staff are eligible for the following awards: the New York Drama Critics' Circle Award, the Outer Critics Circle Award, the Drama Desk Award, the Obie Award (presented since 1956 by The Village Voice), the Lucille Lortel Award (created in 1985 by the League of Off-Broadway Theatres & Producers), and the Drama League Award. Although off-Broadway shows are not eligible for Tony Awards, an exception was made in 1956 (before the rules were changed), when Lotte Lenya won Best Performance by a Featured Actress in a Musical for the off-Broadway production of The Threepenny Opera.

== List of off-Broadway theatres ==
Capacity is based on the capacity given for the respective theatre at the Internet Off-Broadway Database.

Theatre	Address	Capacity
47th Street Theatre	W. 47th St. (No. 304)	196
59E59 Theaters, Theatre A	E. 59th St. (No. 59)	196
777 Theatre	8th Ave. (No. 777)	158
Abrons Arts Center, Playhouse Theatre	Grand St. (No. 466)	300
Actors Temple Theatre	W. 47th St. (No. 339)	199
Alice Griffin Jewel Box Theatre	W. 42nd St. (No. 480)	191
Anne L. Bernstein Theater	W. 50th St. (No. 210)	199
Anspacher Theatre	Lafayette St. (No. 425)	275
Astor Place Theatre	Lafayette St. (No. 434)	298
Asylum NYC	E. 24th St. (No. 123)	150
Cherry Lane Theatre	Commerce St. (No. 38)	179
Claire Tow Theater	W. 65th St. (No. 150)	112
Classic Stage Company	E. 13th St. (No. 136)	199
Daryl Roth Theatre	E. 15th St. (No. 101)	299
The Duke on 42nd Street	W. 42nd St. (No. 229)	199
Ellen Stewart Theater, La MaMa	E. 4th St. (No. 66)	175
Gramercy Arts Theatre	E. 27th St. (No. 138)	140
Greenwich House Theatre	Barrow St. (No. 27)	199
The Gym at Judson	Thompson St. (No. 243)	200
Irene Diamond Stage, Signature Theatre	W. 42nd St. (No. 480)	294
Irish Repertory Theatre	W. 22nd St. (No. 132)	148
Jerome Robbins Theatre	W. 37th St. (No. 450)	238
Jerry Orbach Theater	W. 50th St. (No. 210)	199
John Cullum Theatre	W. 54th St. (No. 314)	140
Laura Pels Theatre	W. 46th St. (No. 111)	425
Linda Gross Theatre	W. 20th St. (No. 336)	199
Loreto Theater, Sheen Center	Bleeker St. (No. 18)	273
Lucille Lortel Theatre	Christopher St. (No. 121)	299
LuEsther Theatre	Lafayette St. (No. 425)	160
Manhattan Movement & Arts Center	W. 60th St. (No. 248)	180
Marjorie S. Deane Little Theater	W. 63rd St. (No. 5)	145
Martinson Theatre	Lafayette St. (No. 425)	199
Minetta Lane Theatre	Minetta Lane (No. 18)	391
Mitzi E. Newhouse Theater	W. 65th St. (No. 150)	299
New Victory Theater	W. 42nd St. (No. 209)	499
New World Stages, Stage 1	W. 50th St. (No. 340)	499
New World Stages, Stage 2	W. 50th St. (No. 340)	350
New World Stages, Stage 3	W. 50th St. (No. 340)	499
New World Stages, Stage 4	W. 50th St. (No. 340)	350
New World Stages, Stage 5	W. 50th St. (No. 340)	199
New York City Center Stage I	W. 55th St. (No. 131)	300
New York City Center Stage II	W. 55th St. (No. 131)	150
New York Theatre Workshop, Theatre 79	E. 4th St. (No. 79)	199
Newman Theatre	Lafayette St. (No. 425)	299
Newman Mills Theatre	W. 52nd St. (No. 511)	245
Orpheum Theatre	Second Ave. (No. 126)	347
Peter Jay Sharp Theatre at Playwrights Horizons	W. 42nd St. (No. 416)	128
Players Theatre	MacDougal St. (No. 115)	248
Playwrights Horizons Mainstage	W. 42nd St. (No. 416)	198
The Shed (Kenneth C. Griffin Theater)	545 W. 30th St.	500
Romulus Linney Courtyard Theatre	W. 42nd St. (No. 480)	191
SoHo Playhouse	Vandam St. (No. 15)	178
St. Luke's Theatre	W. 46th St. (No. 308)	178
Stage 42	W. 42nd St. (No. 422)	499
Studio Seaview	W. 43rd St. (No. 305)	296
Susan & Ronald Frankel Theatre	W. 52nd St. (No. 511)	100
Theater 555	W. 42nd St. (No. 555)	130
The Theater at St. Clement’s	W. 46th St. (No. 423)	161
WP Theater	Broadway (No. 2162)	108
Theatre at St. Jeans	E. 76th St. (No. 150)	204
Theatre Three at Theatre Row	W. 42nd St. (No. 410)	199
Triad Theatre	W. 72nd St. (No. 158)	130
Vineyard Theatre	E. 15th St. (No. 108)	132
Westside Theatre, Downstairs Theatre	W. 43rd St. (No. 407)	249
Westside Theatre, Upstairs Theatre	W. 43rd St. (No. 407)	270

== See also ==
- Little Theatre Movement
- Little Theatre Guild of Great Britain
- Off West End
- Upstairs at the Downstairs
