= Gilbert Price =

American actor

- Born: September 10, 1942; New York City, New York, U.S.
- Died: January 2, 1991 (aged 48); Vienna, Austria
- Occupations: Stage, film, television actor
- Awards: Tony Award for Best Featured Actor in a Musical nominee (1972); Tony Award for Best Featured Actor in a Musical nominee (1975); Tony Award for Best Actor in a Musical nominee (1978); Theatre World Award (1964)

Gilbert Price (September 10, 1942 – January 2, 1991) was an American operatic baritone and actor.

Price was a protégé of Langston Hughes. He was a life member of New York's famed Actors Studio. Price first gained notice in 1964, for his performances in Hughes' Off-Broadway production of Jerico-Jim Crow. For his work, Price received a Theatre World Award.

== Early life ==
Price was born on September 10, 1942, in New York City of African-American heritage. In 1960, he graduated from Erasmus Hall High School, where he stood out for both his talent and gentle, easygoing manner. It has been written that while he was a protégé of Langston Hughes, Hughes had become smitten with the young Price. Unpublished love poems by Hughes were addressed to a man Hughes called Beauty; it has been posited these poems referred to Price.

== Career ==
Price made guest appearances on several television talk and variety shows including The Ed Sullivan Show, Red Skelton, Garry Moore and The Merv Griffin Show. Price also sang oratorios, including Leonard Bernstein's Mass, in 1971.

== Awards ==
Price was nominated for three Tony Awards and was the recipient of a Theatre World Award:

- Jerico-Jim Crow (1964) – Theatre World Award
- Lost in the Stars (1972) – Tony Award for Best Featured Actor in a Musical
- The Night That Made America Famous (1975) – Tony Award for Best Featured Actor in a Musical
- Timbuktu! (1978) – Tony Award for Best Actor in a Musical

== Other works ==
- Fly Blackbird (1962) - C. Bernard Jackson & James Hatch
- The Roar of the Greasepaint – The Smell of the Crowd (1965) - Leslie Bricusse & Anthony Newley
- Promenade (1969) - Maria Irene Fornes & Al Carmines
- 1600 Pennsylvania Avenue (1976) - Leonard Bernstein & Alan Jay Lerner

== Death ==
Price died in Vienna, Austria, in 1991 at age 48, of accidental asphyxiation due to a faulty space heater.
