= Tony Award for Best Featured Actor in a Musical =

American theatre award for Broadway actors

- Awarded for: Best Performance by a Featured Actor in a Musical
- Location: United States New York City
- Presented by: American Theatre Wing The Broadway League
- Currently held by: Ali Louis Bourzgui for The Lost Boys (2026)
- Website: TonyAwards.com

The Tony Award for Best Performance by a Featured Actor in a Musical is an honor presented at the Tony Awards, a ceremony established in 1947 as the Antoinette Perry Awards for Excellence in Theatre, to actors for quality supporting roles in a musical play, whether a new production or a revival. The awards are named after Perry, an American actress who died in 1946.

Honors in several categories are presented at the ceremony annually by the Tony Award Productions, a joint venture of The Broadway League and the American Theatre Wing, to "honor the best performances and stage productions of the previous year."

The award was originally called the Tony Award for Best Performance in a Musical. It was first presented to David Wayne at the 1st Tony Awards for his portrayal of Og in Finian's Rainbow. Before 1956, nominees' names were not made public; the change was made by the awards committee to "have a greater impact on theatregoers". Following the first ceremony, this category was not awarded until 1950 when it was renamed to Best Performance by an Actor in a Featured or Supporting Role in a Musical. It was renamed again to its current title in 1976.

Hinton Battle holds the record for having the most wins in this category, with a total of three. No characters have taken the award multiple times, but Herbie in Gypsy is the most nominated with five.

== Winners and nominees ==
indicates the winner

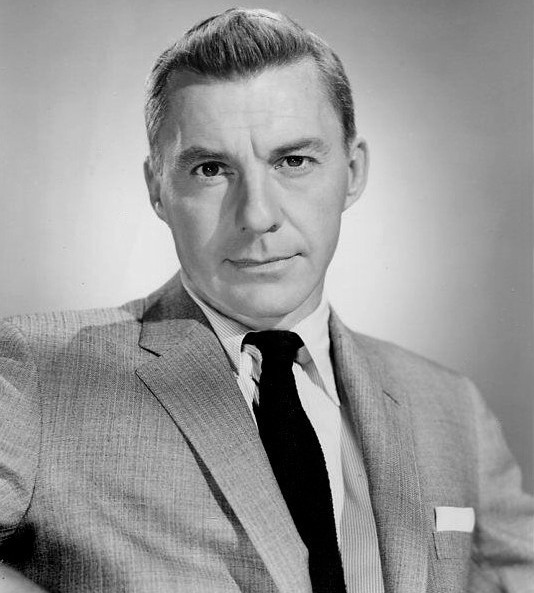
David Wayne won for Finian's Rainbow (1947)

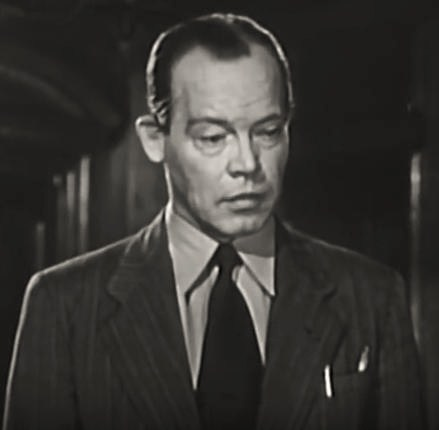
Myron McCormick won for South Pacific (1950)

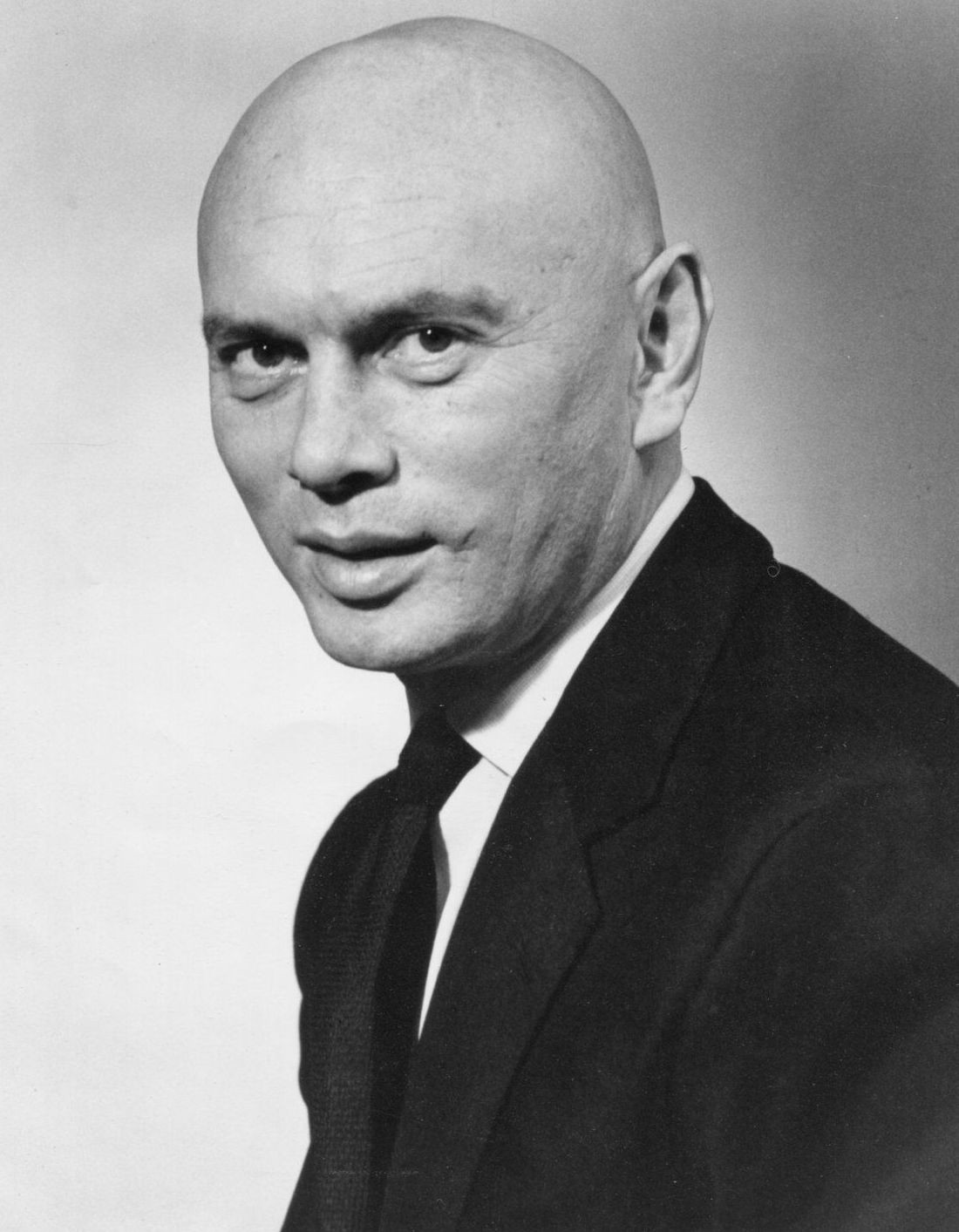
Yul Brynner won for The King and I (1952)

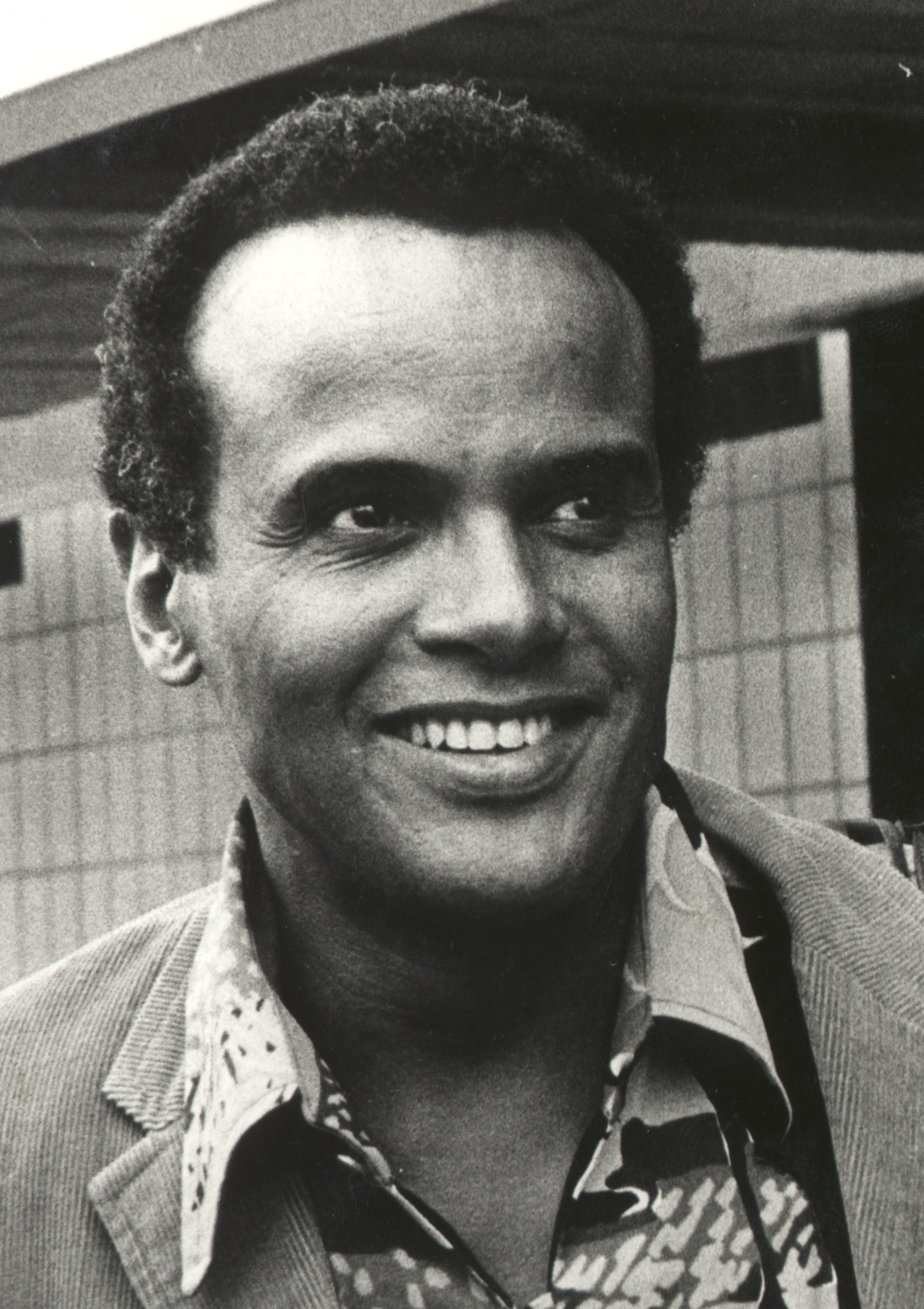
Harry Belafonte won for John Murray Anderson's Almanac (1953)

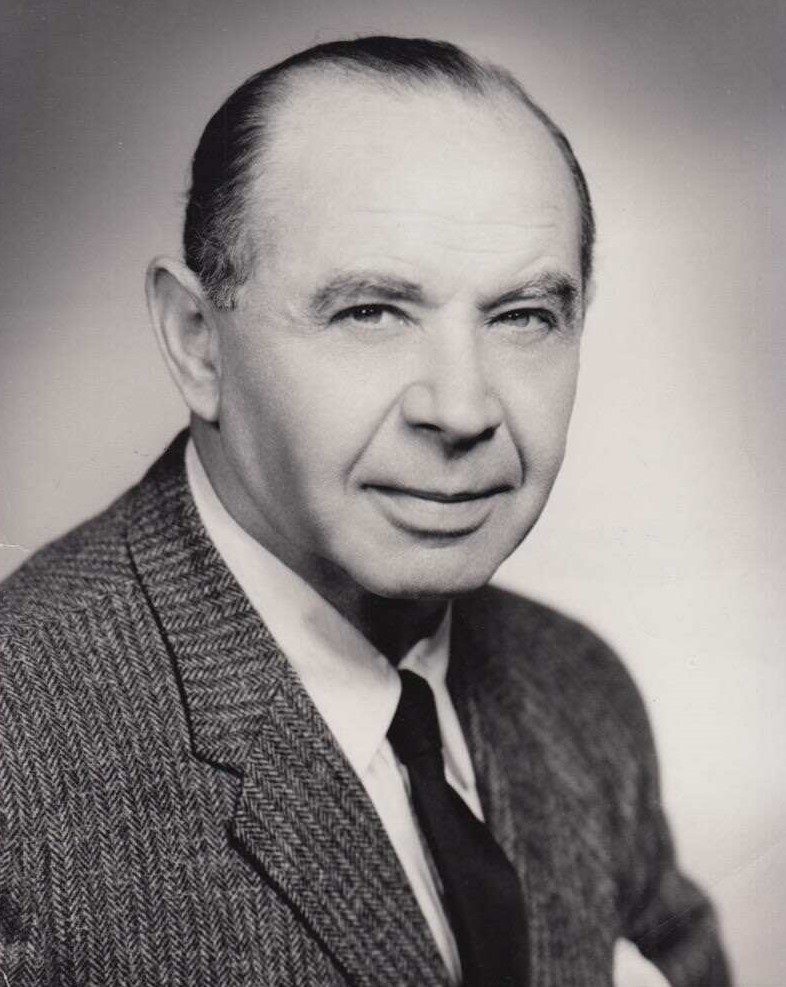
David Burns won twice for The Music Man (1958) and A Funny Thing Happened on the Way to the Forum (1963)

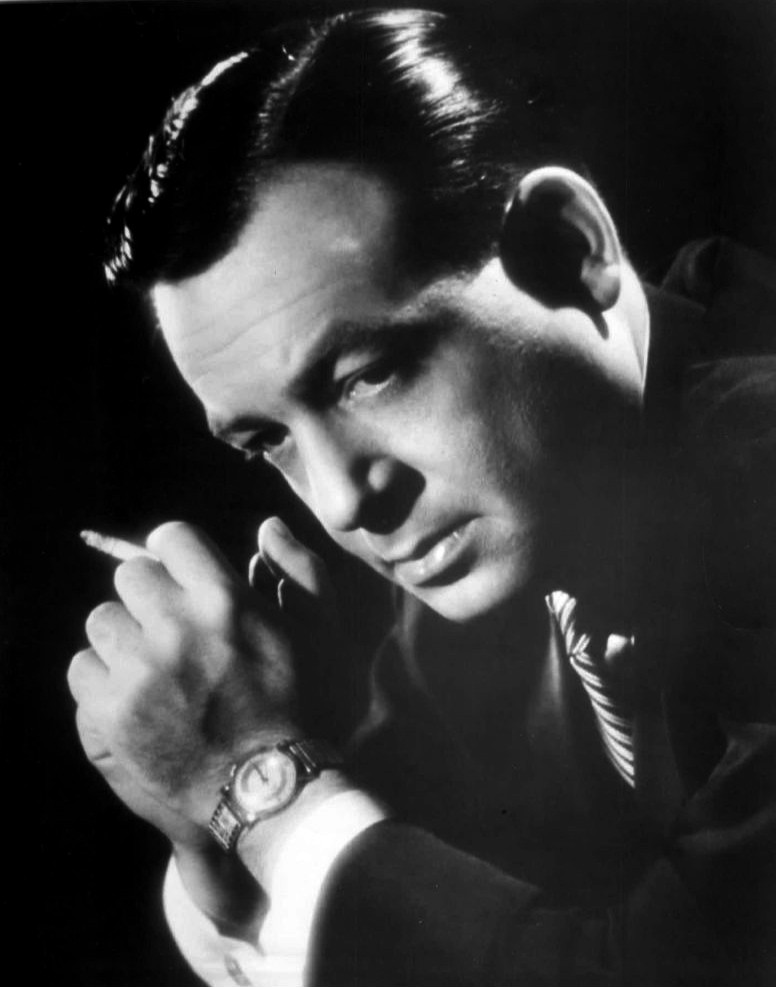
Tom Bosley won for Fiorello! (1960)

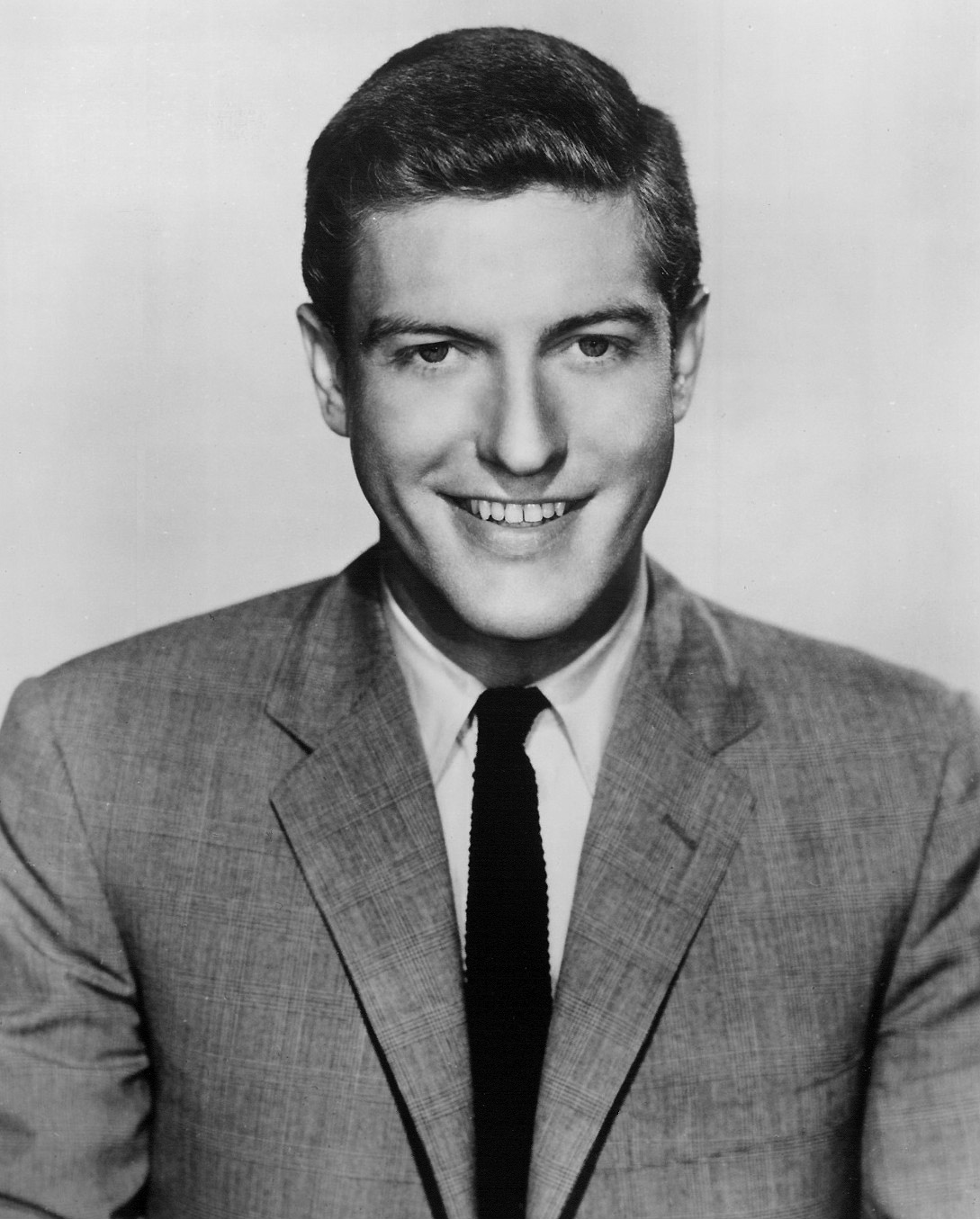
Dick Van Dyke won for Bye Bye Birdie (1961)

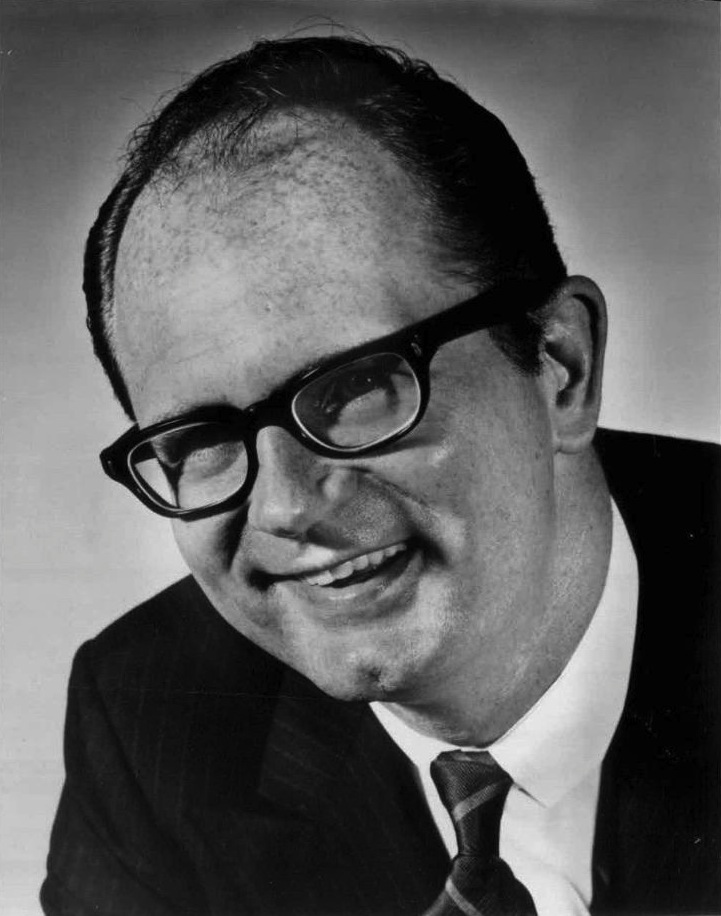
Charles Nelson Reilly won for How to Succeed in Business Without Really Trying (1962)

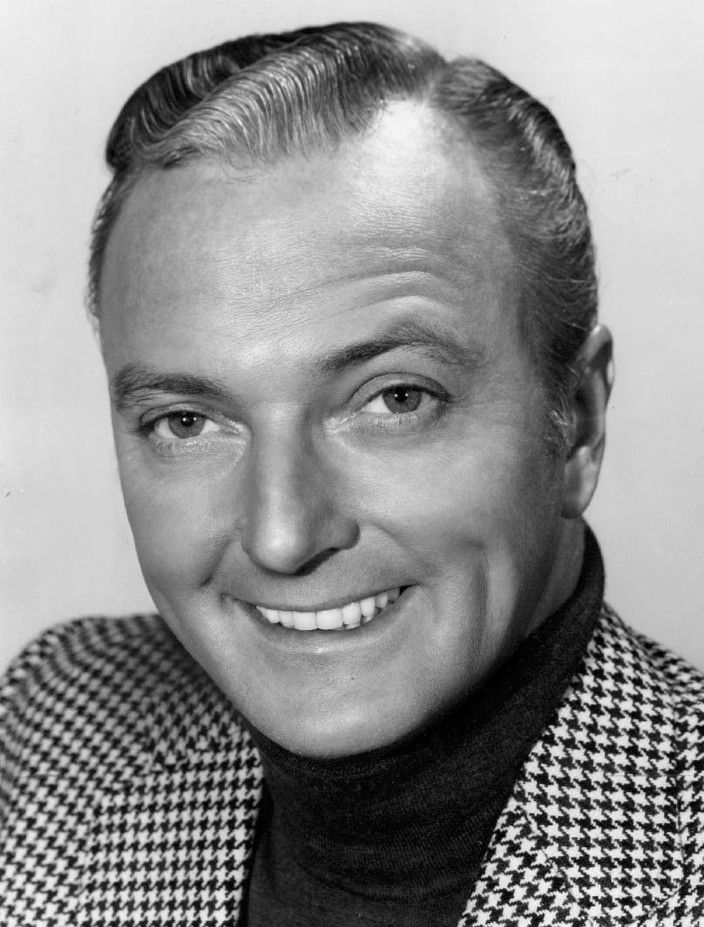
Jack Cassidy won for She Loves Me (1964)

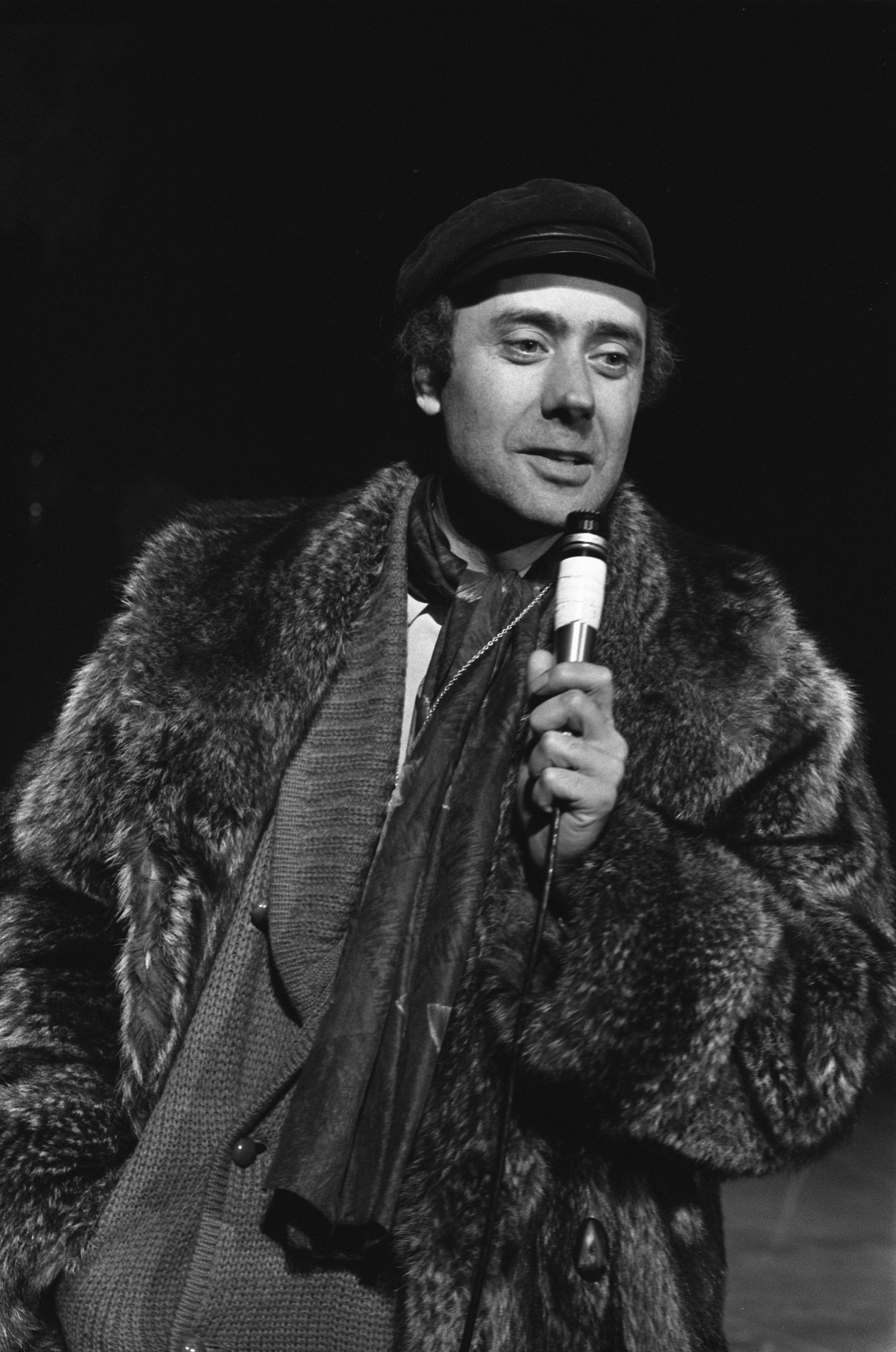
Victor Spinetti won for Oh, What a Lovely War (1965)

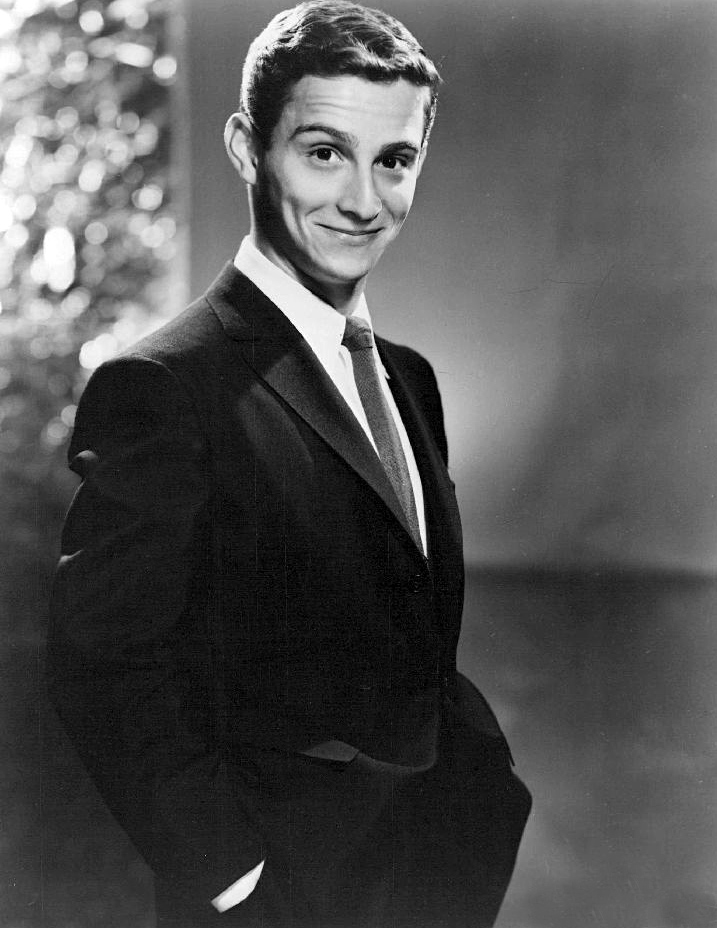
Joel Grey won for Cabaret (1967)

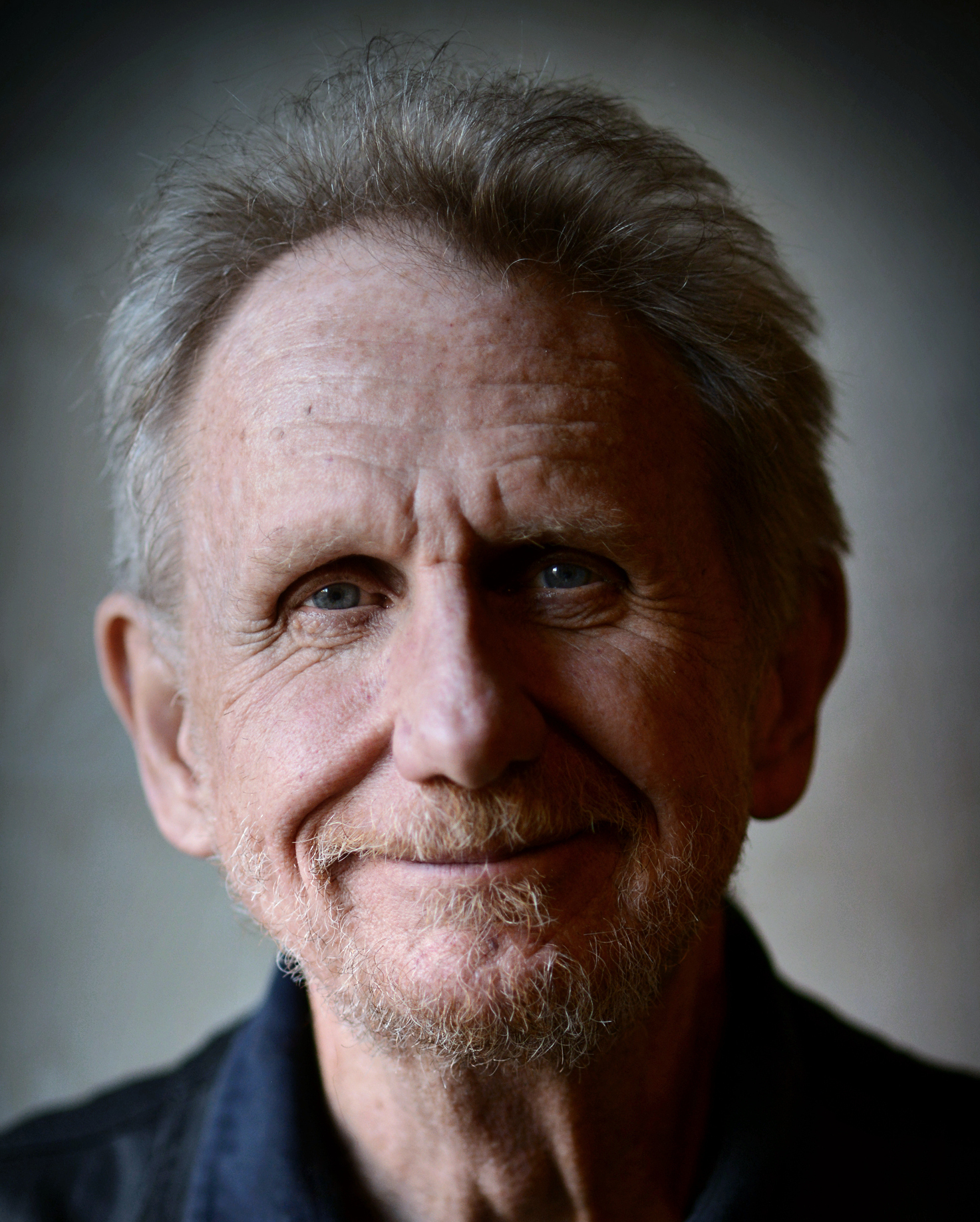
René Auberjonois won for Coco (1970)

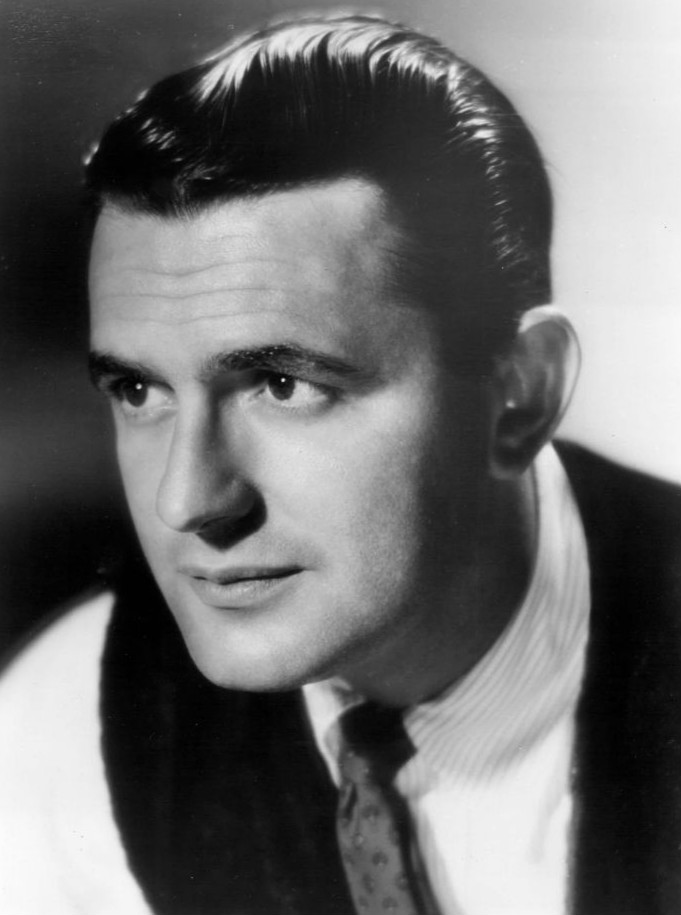
Larry Blyden won for A Funny Thing Happened on the Way to the Forum (1972)

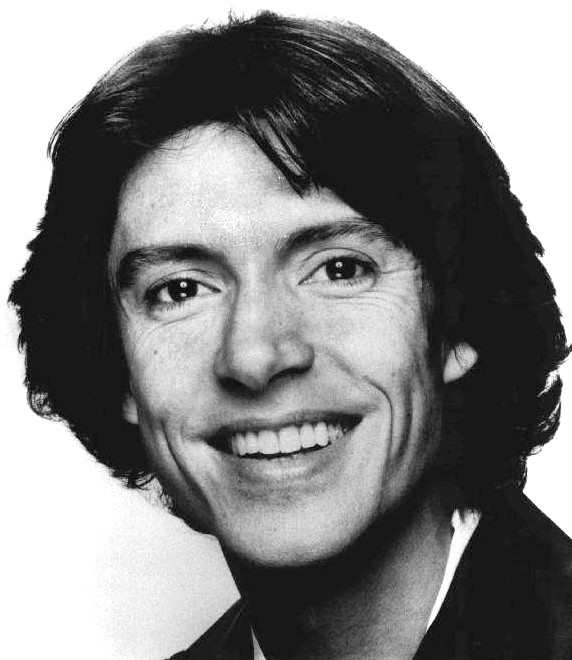
Tommy Tune won for Seesaw (1974)

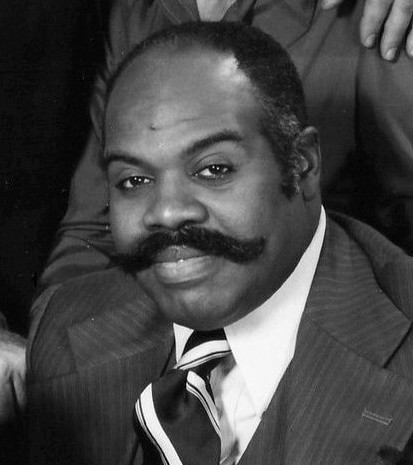
Ted Ross won for The Wiz (1975)

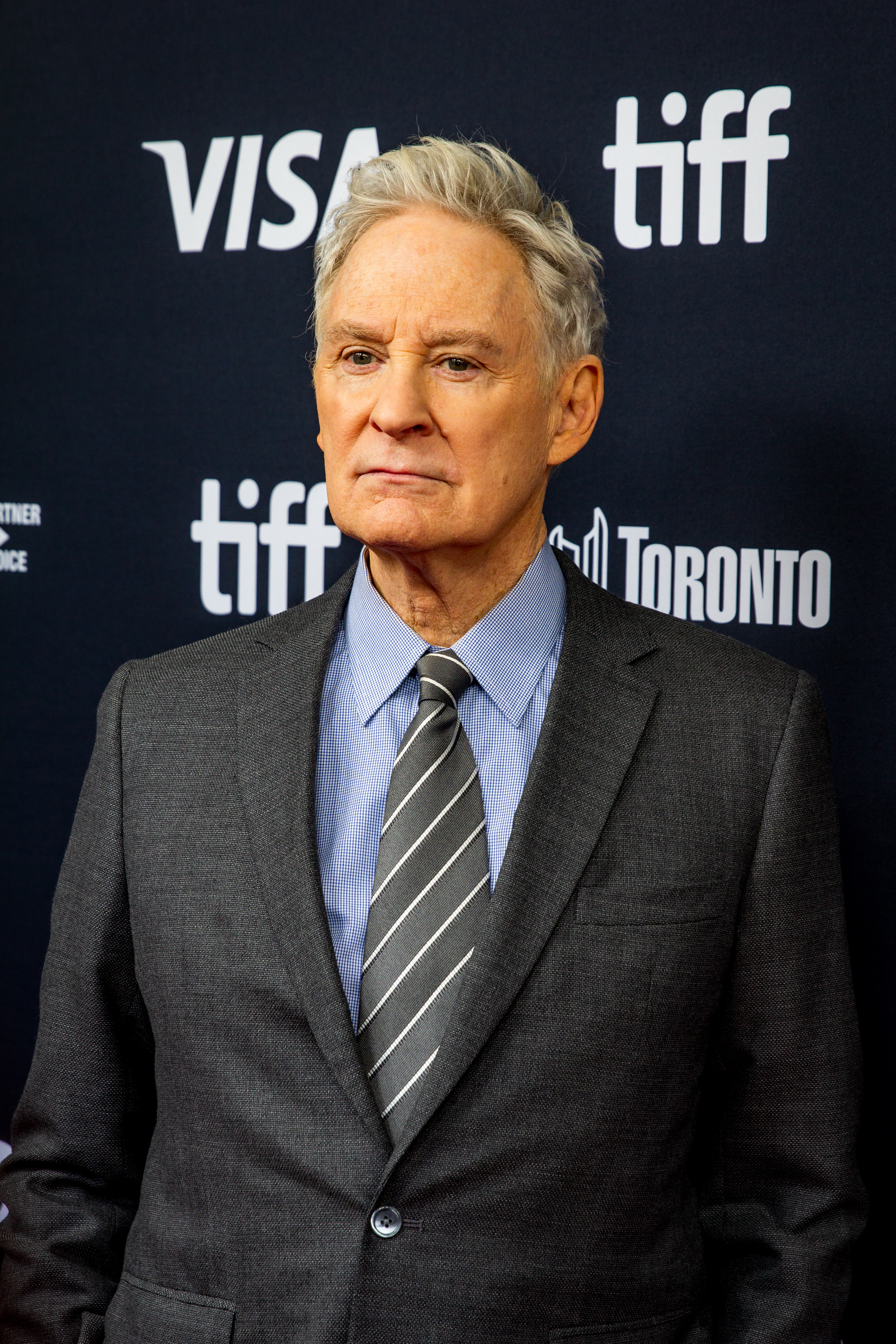
Kevin Kline won for On the Twentieth Century (1978)

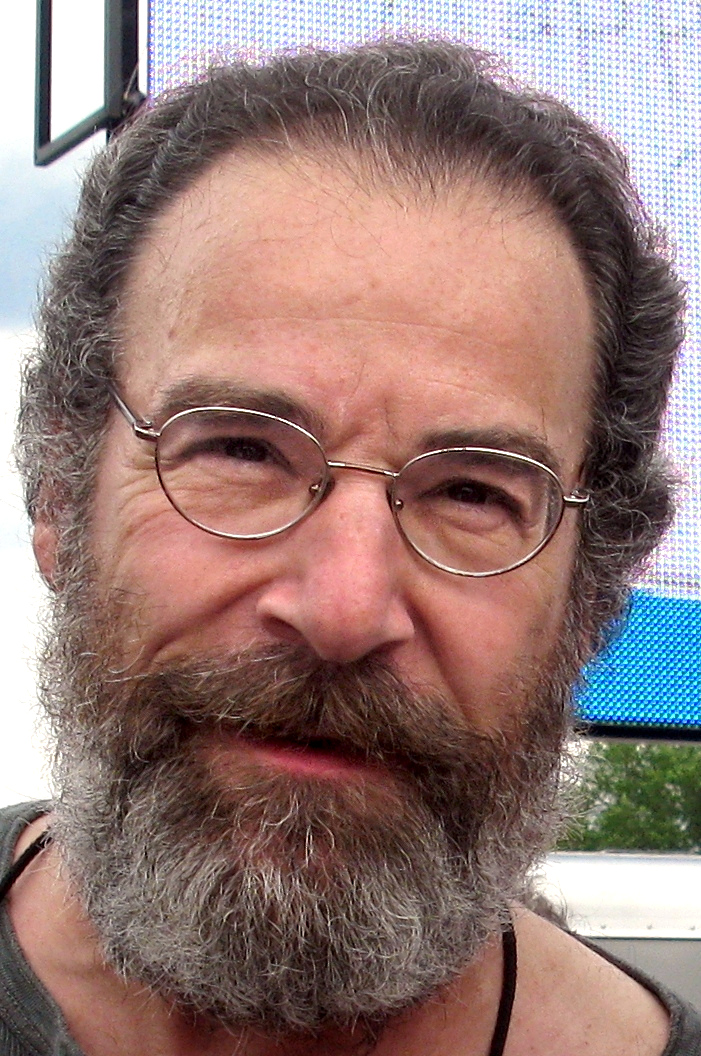
Mandy Patinkin won for Evita (1980)

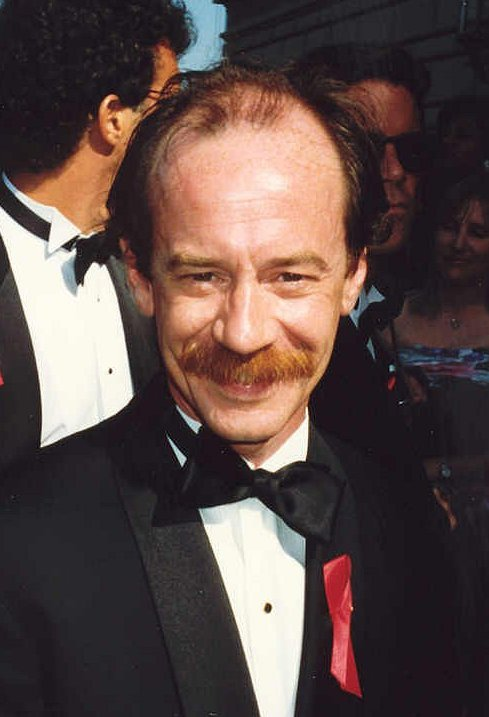
Michael Jeter won for Grand Hotel (1990)

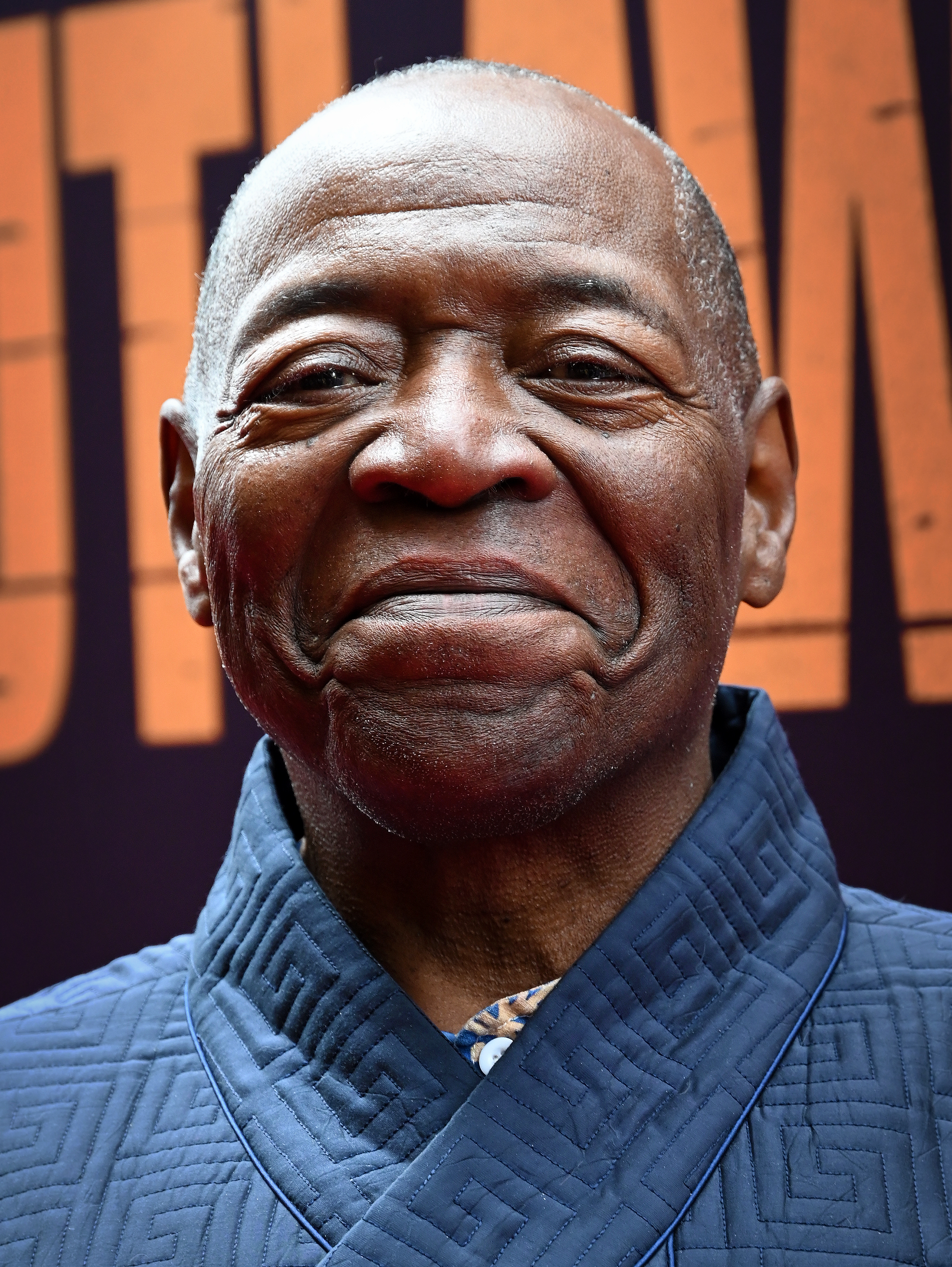
Chuck Cooper won for This Life (1997)

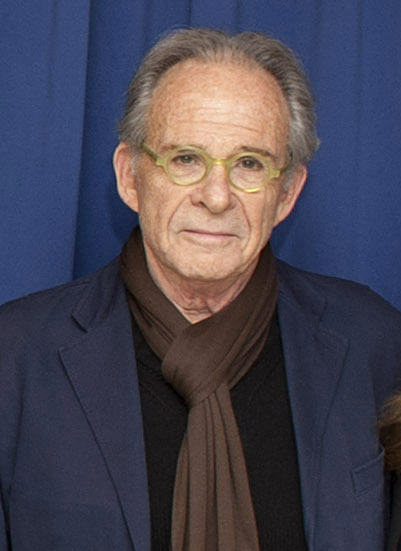
Ron Rifkin won for Cabaret (1998)

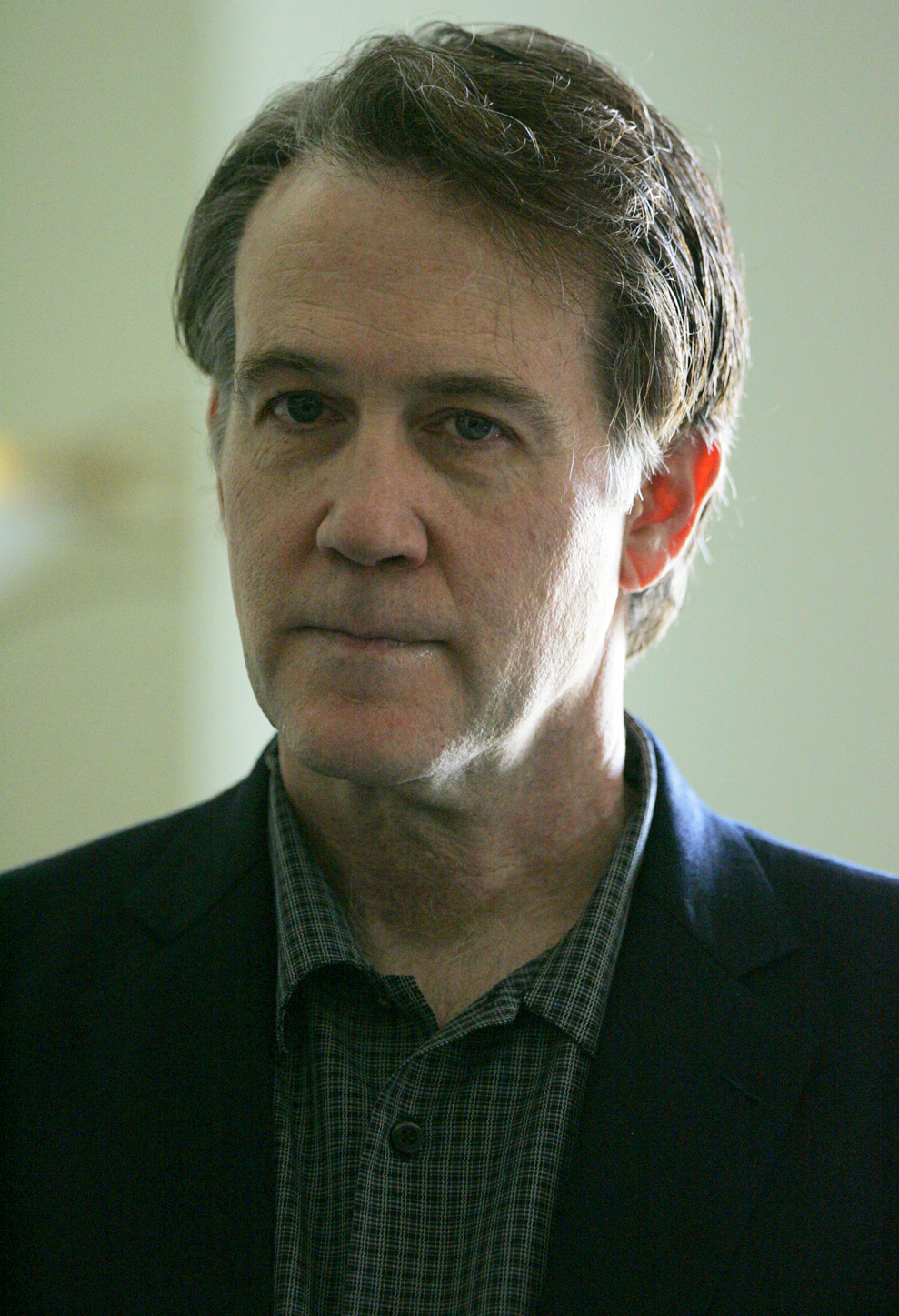
Boyd Gaines won twice: for Contact (2000) and Gypsy (2008)

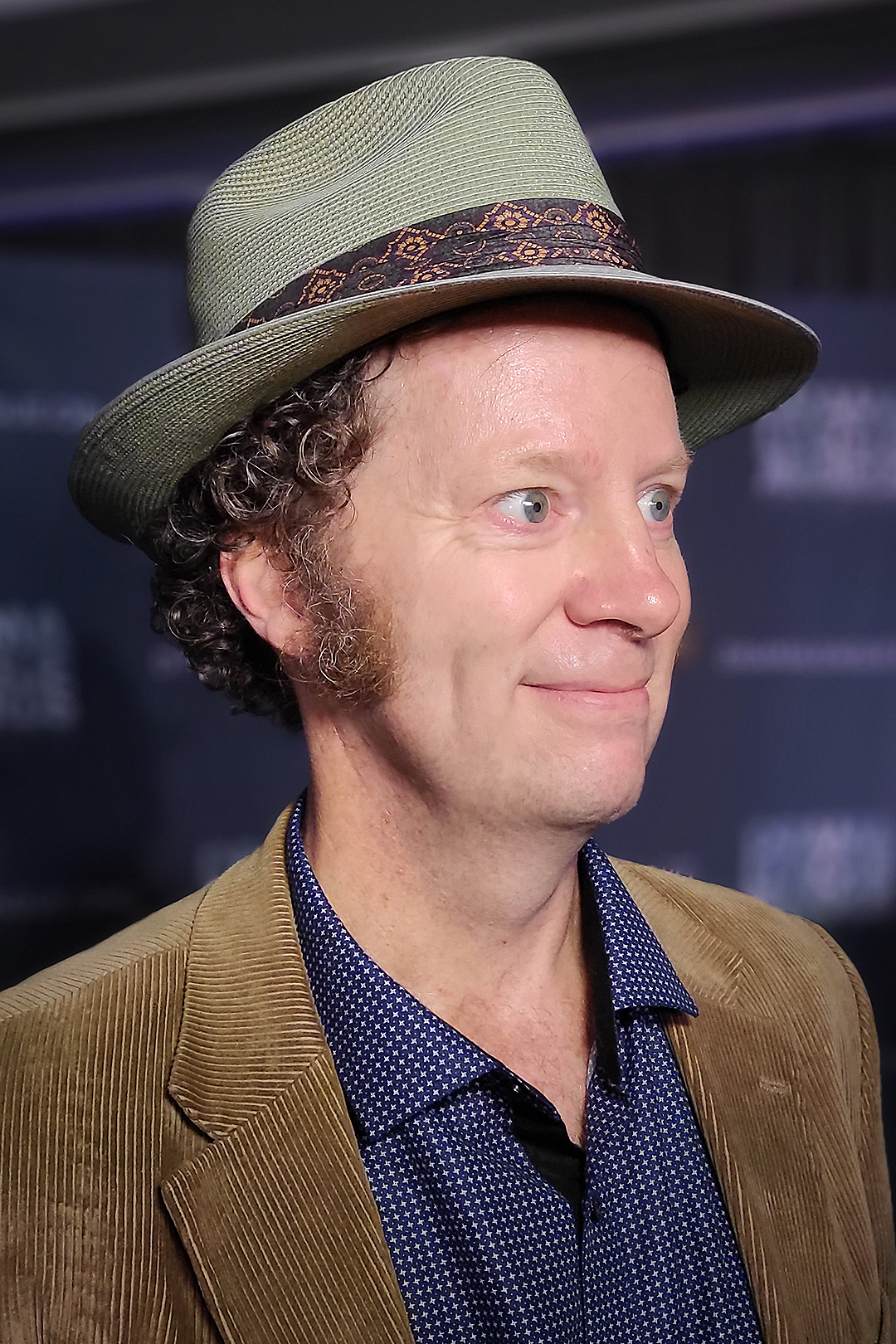
Shuler Hensley won for Oklahoma! (2002)

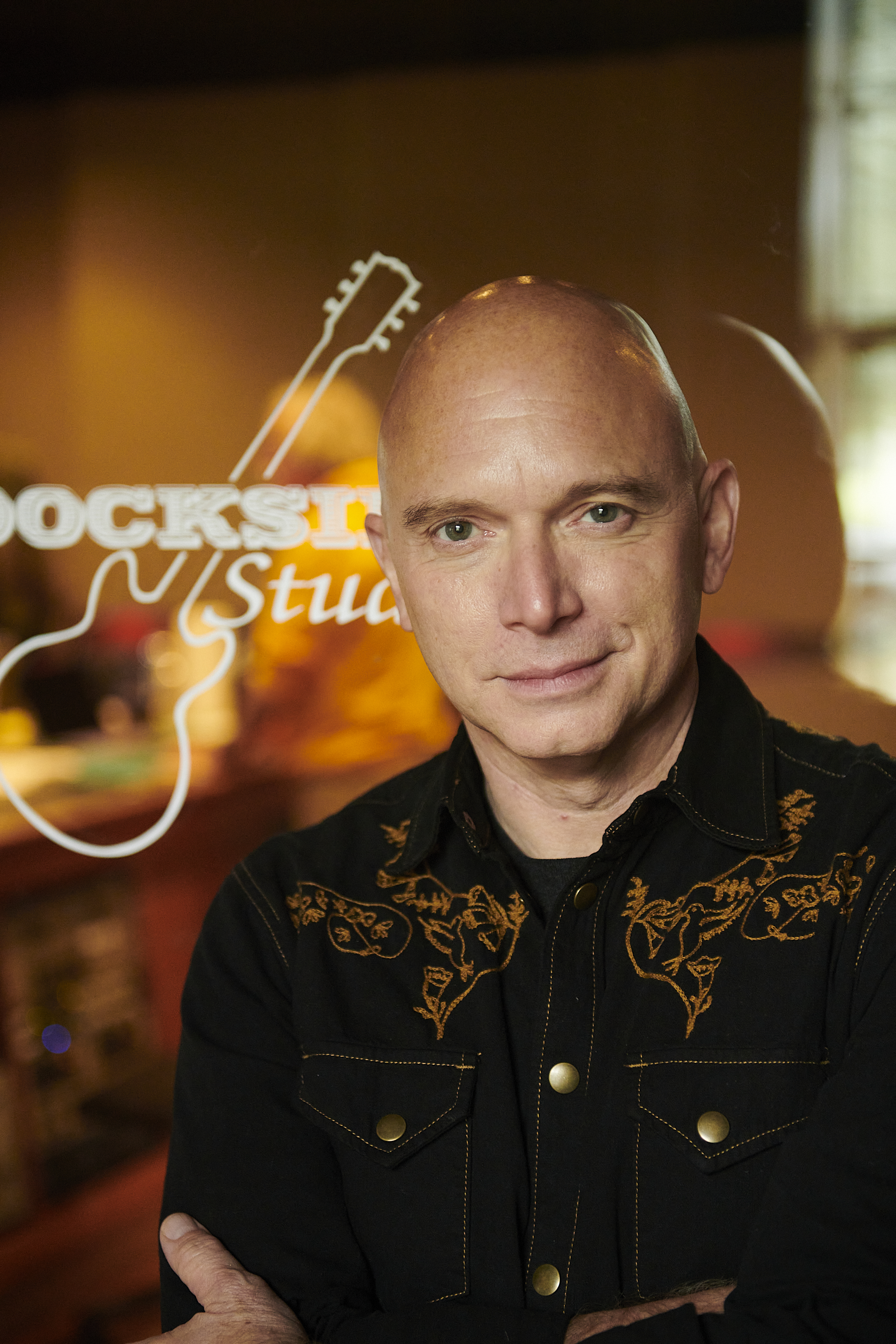
Michael Cerveris won for Assassins (2004)

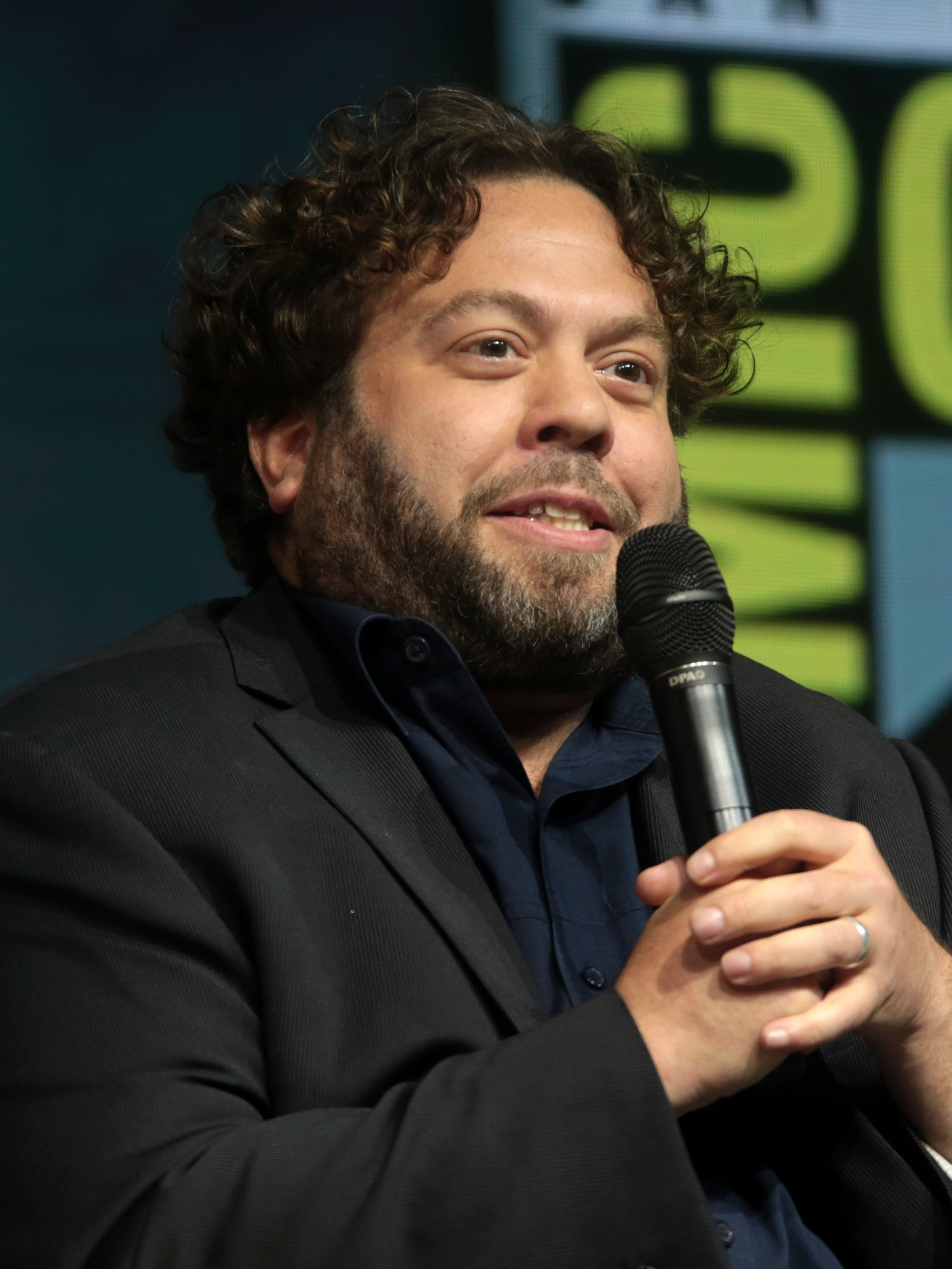
Dan Fogler won for The 25th Annual Putnam County Spelling Bee (2005)

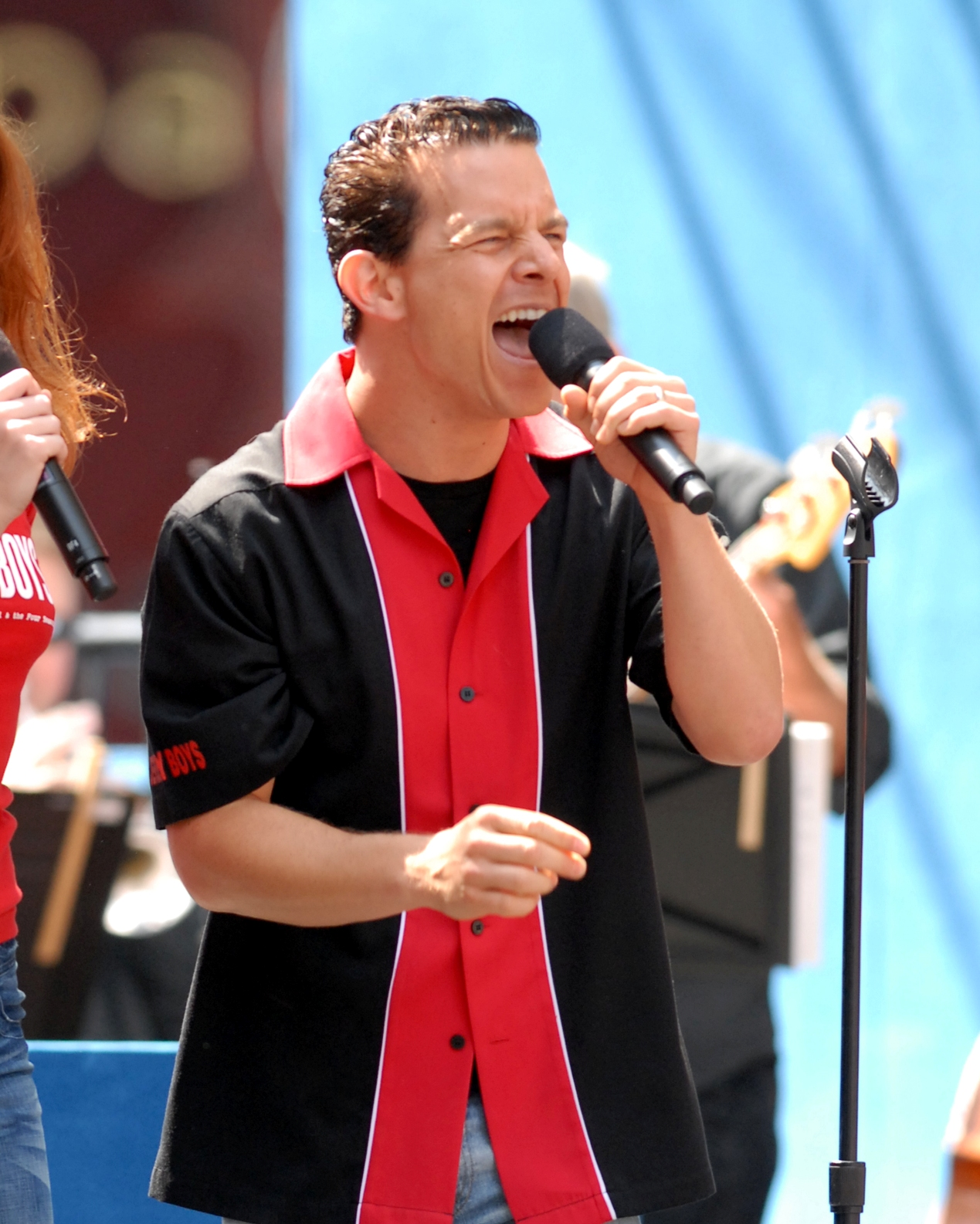
Christian Hoff won for Jersey Boys (2006)

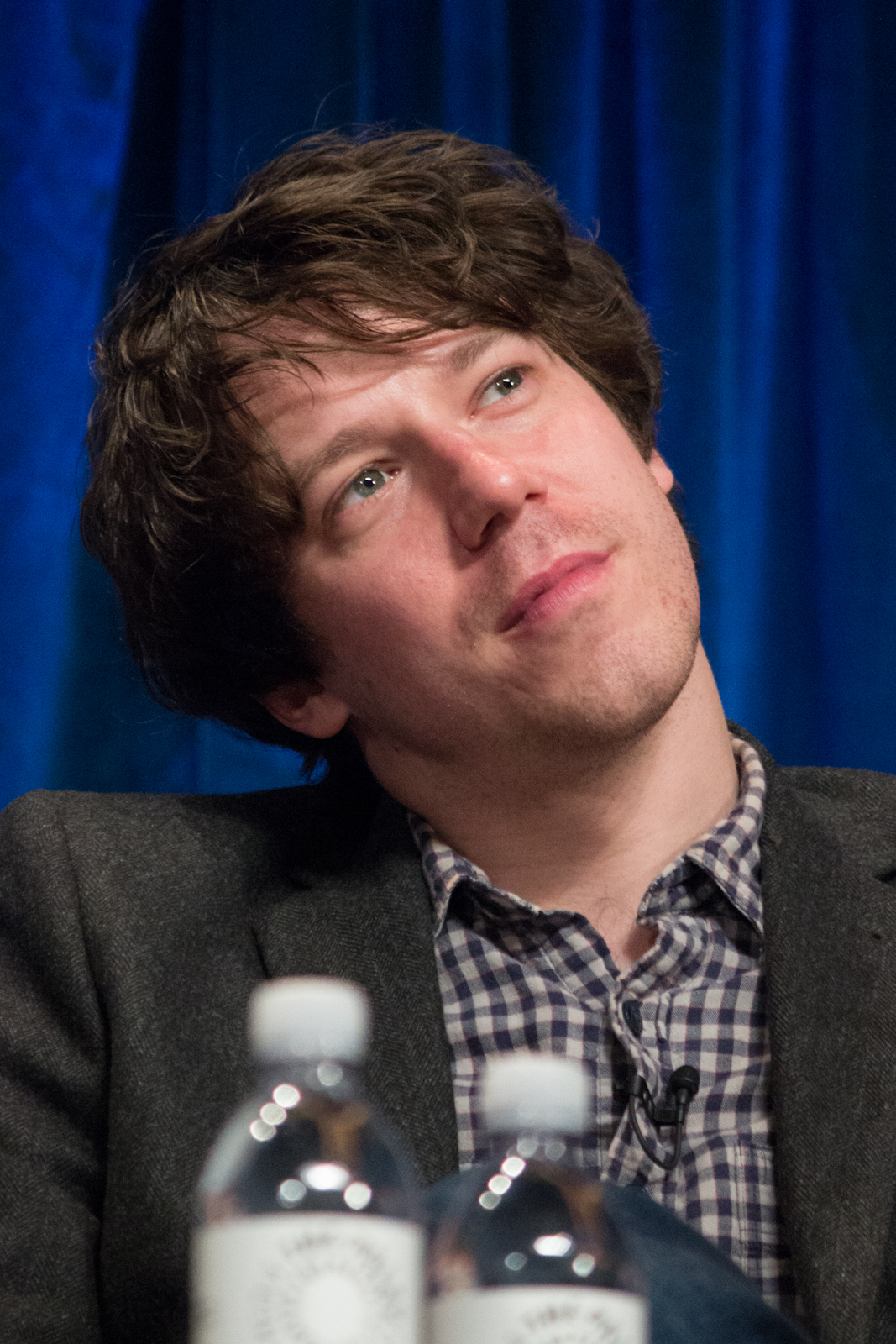
John Gallagher Jr. won for Spring Awakening (2007)

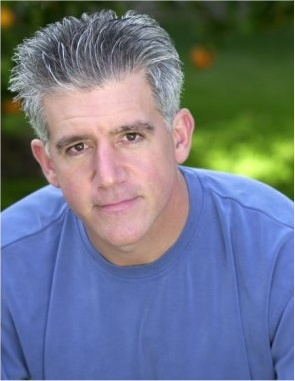
Gregory Jbara won for Billy Elliot the Musical (2009)

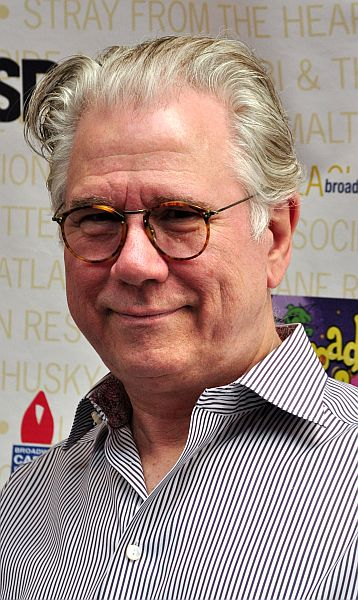
John Larroquette won for How to Succeed in Business Without Really Trying (2011)

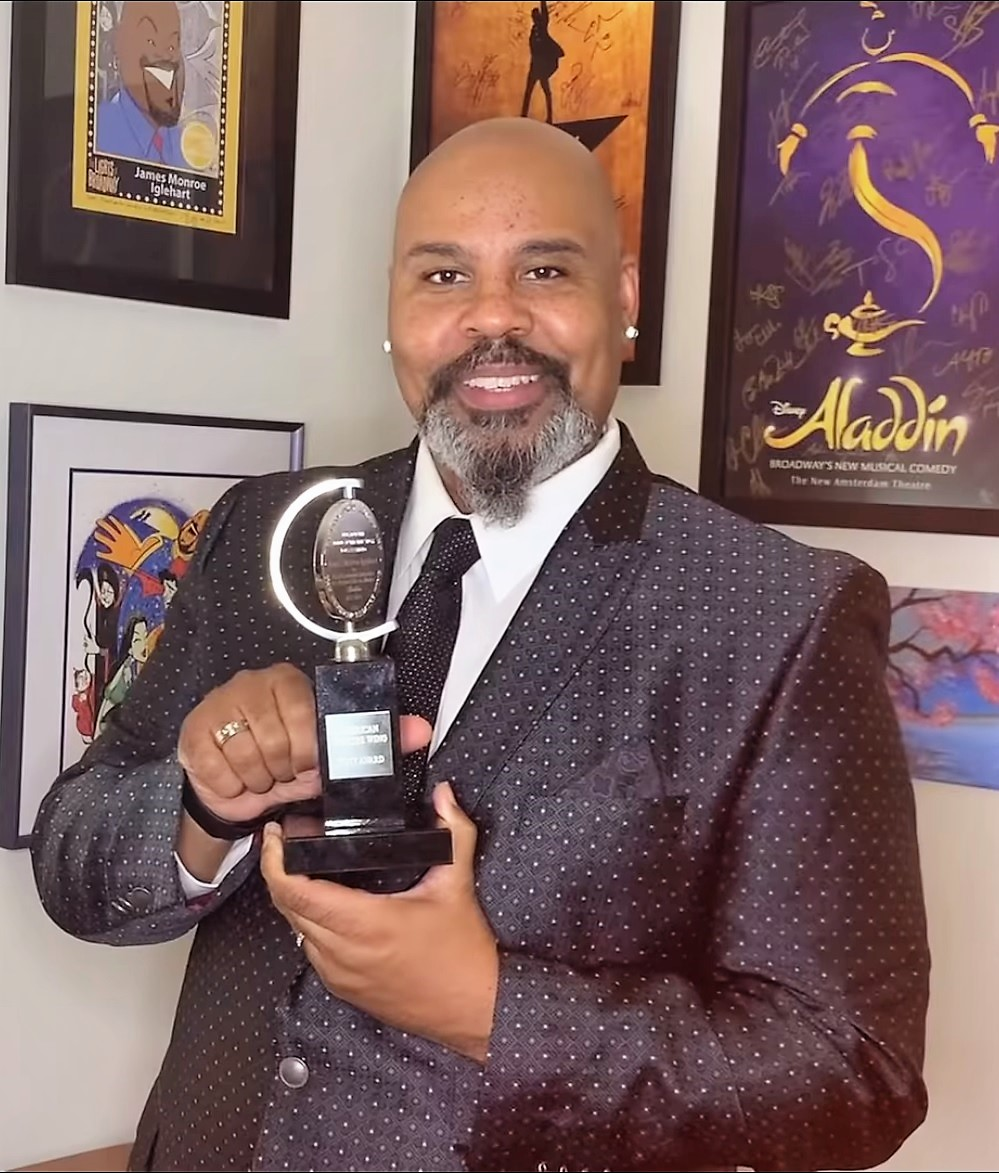
James Monroe Iglehart won for Aladdin (2014)

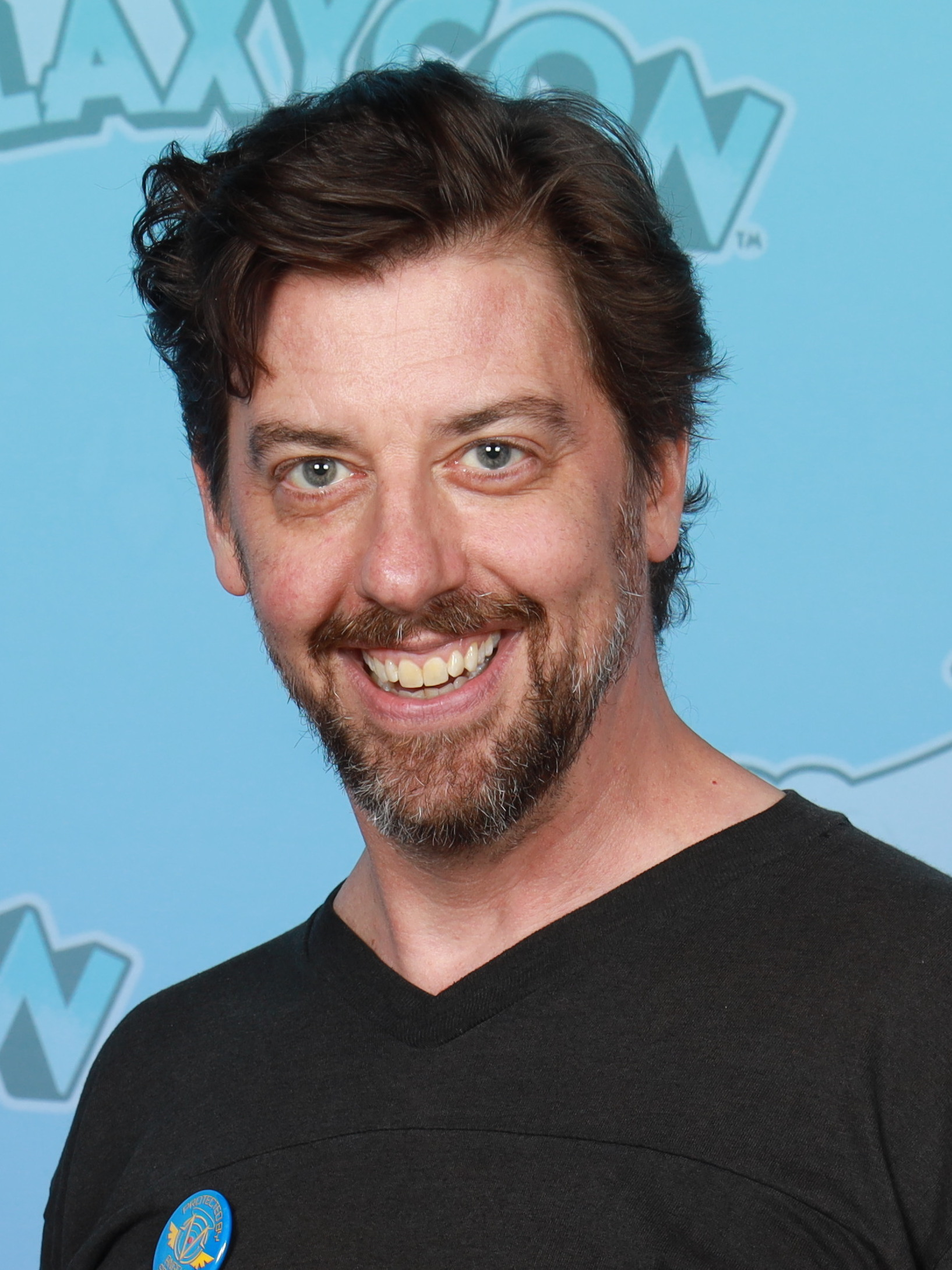
Christian Borle won for Something Rotten! (2015)

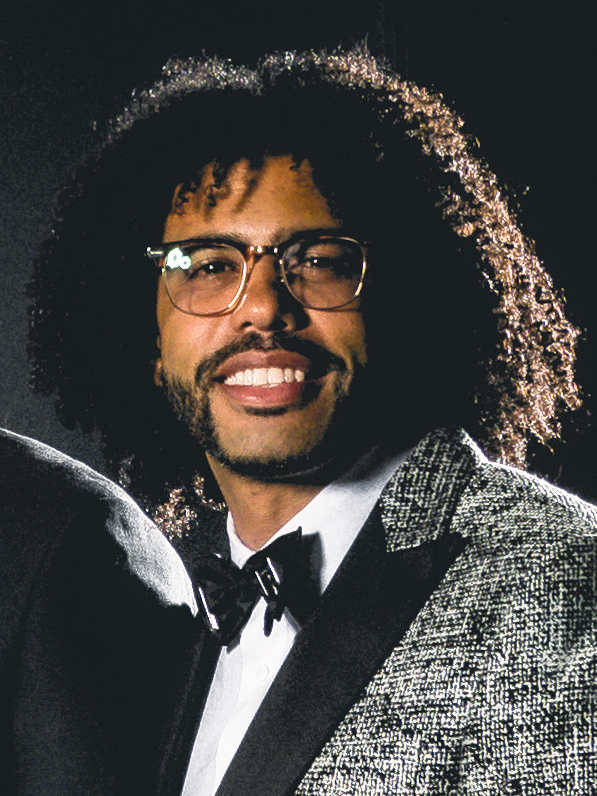
Daveed Diggs won for Hamilton (2016)

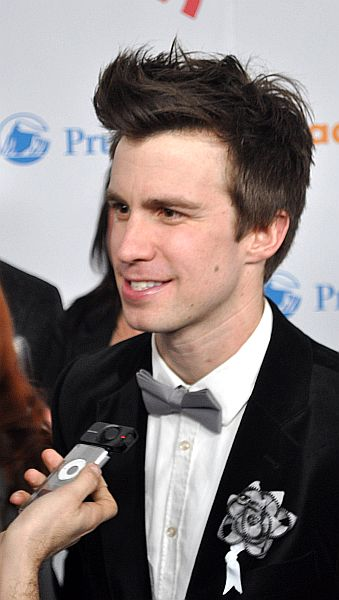
Gavin Creel won for Hello, Dolly! (2017)

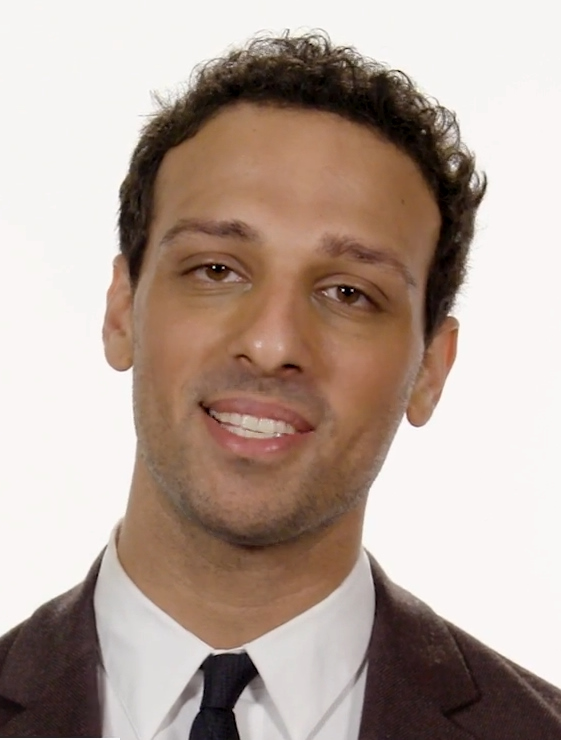
Ari'el Stachel won for The Band's Visit (2018)

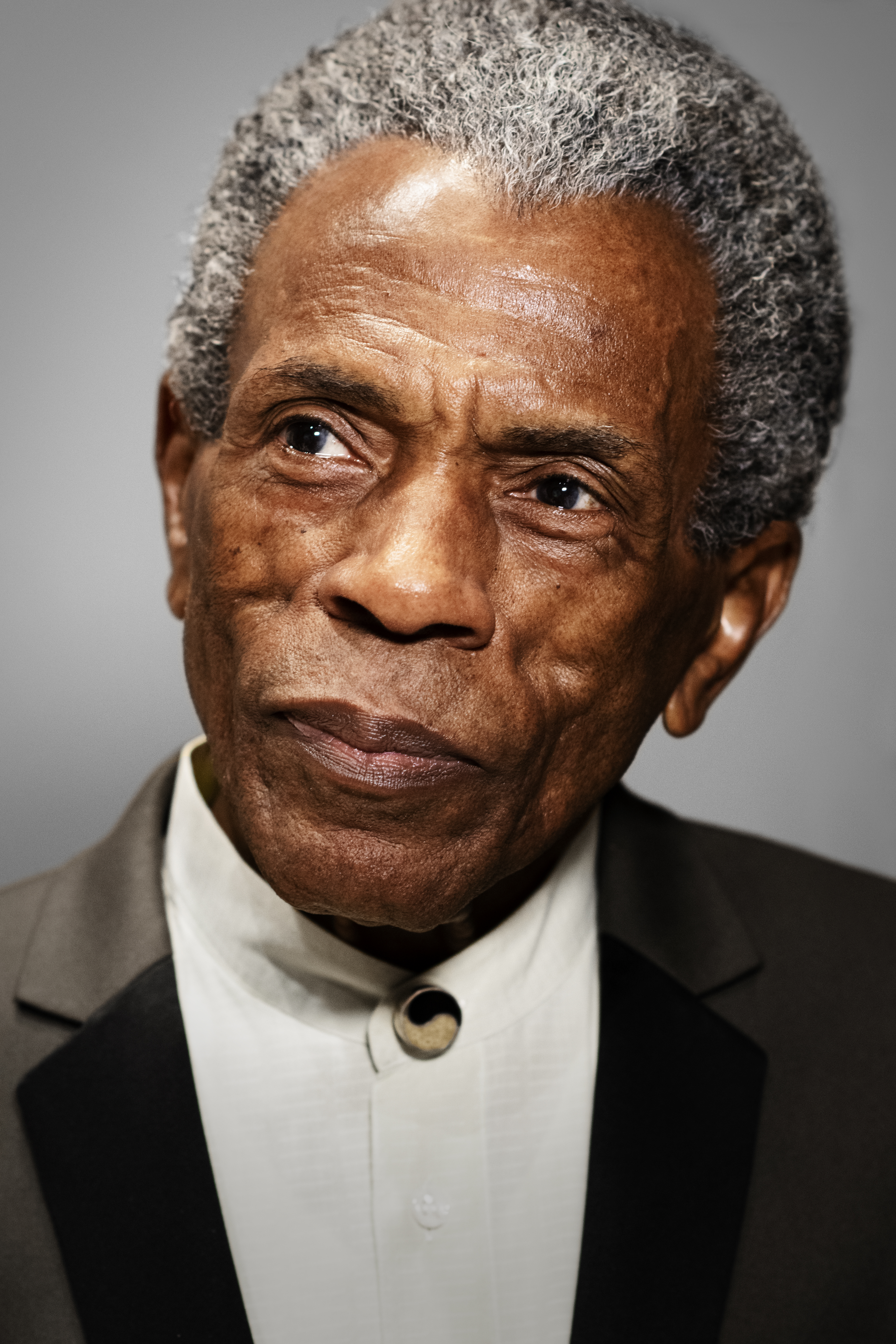
André De Shields won for Hadestown (2019)

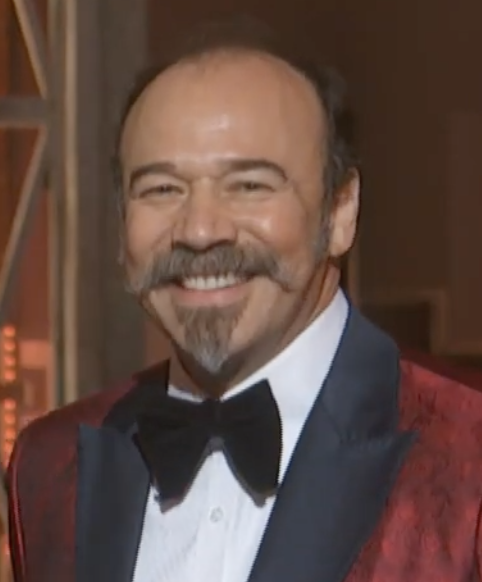
Danny Burstein won for Moulin Rouge! The Musical (2020)

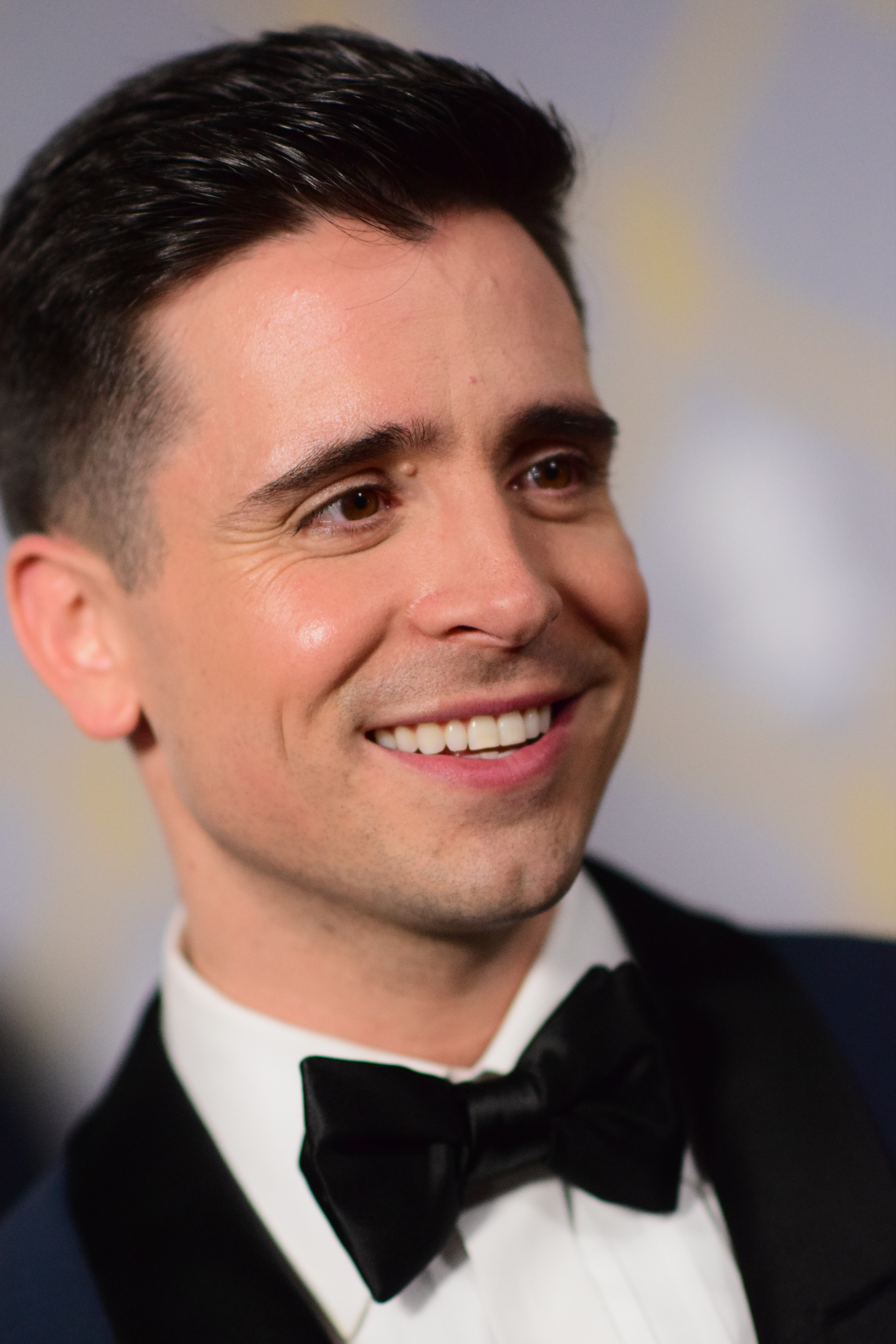
Matt Doyle won for Company (2021)

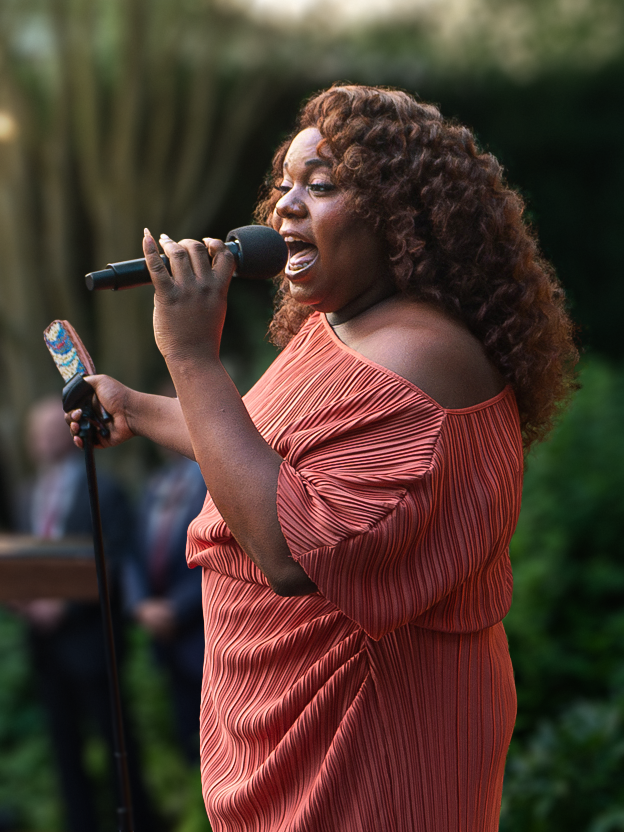
Alex Newell won for Shucked (2023)

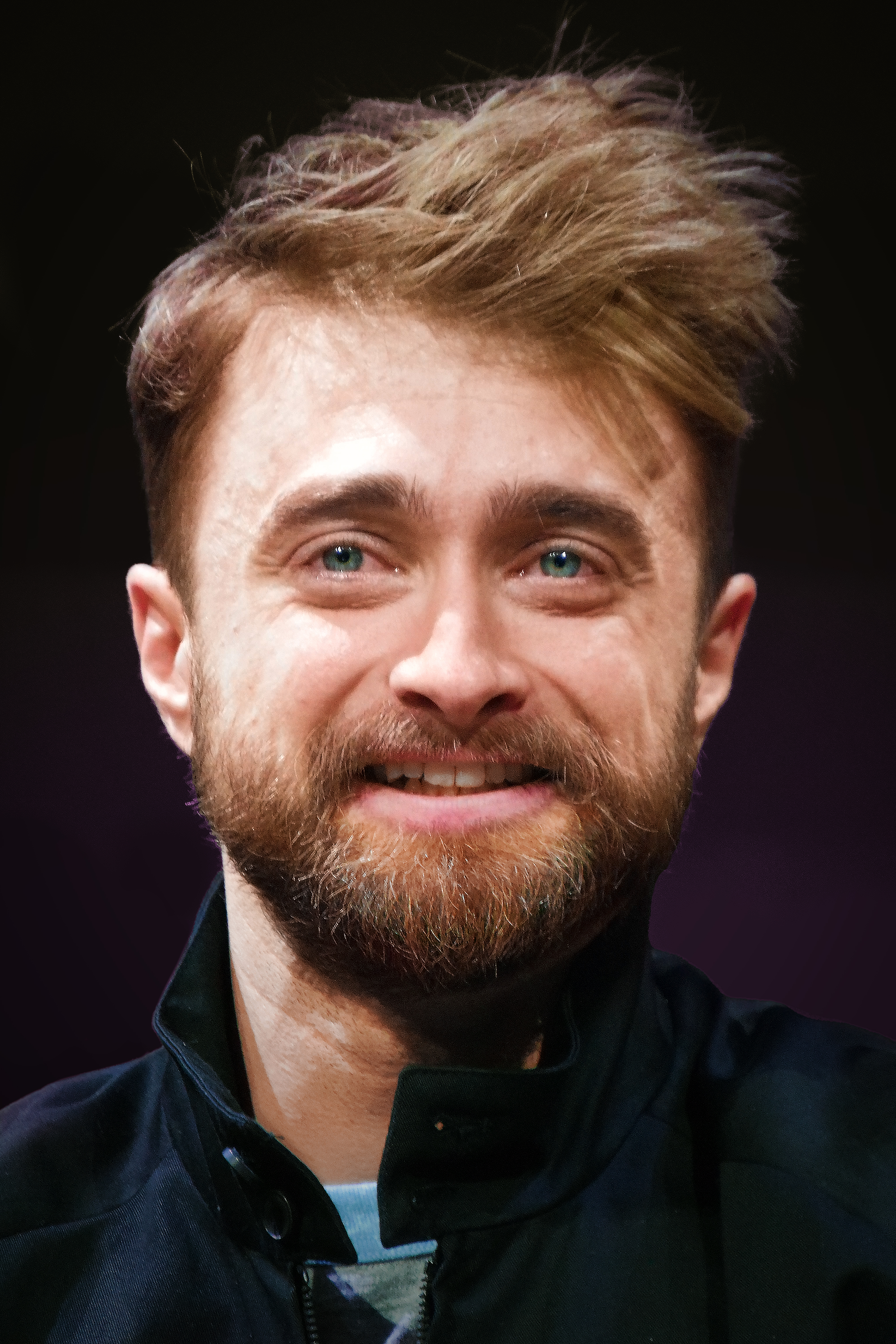
Daniel Radcliffe won for Merrily We Roll Along (2024)

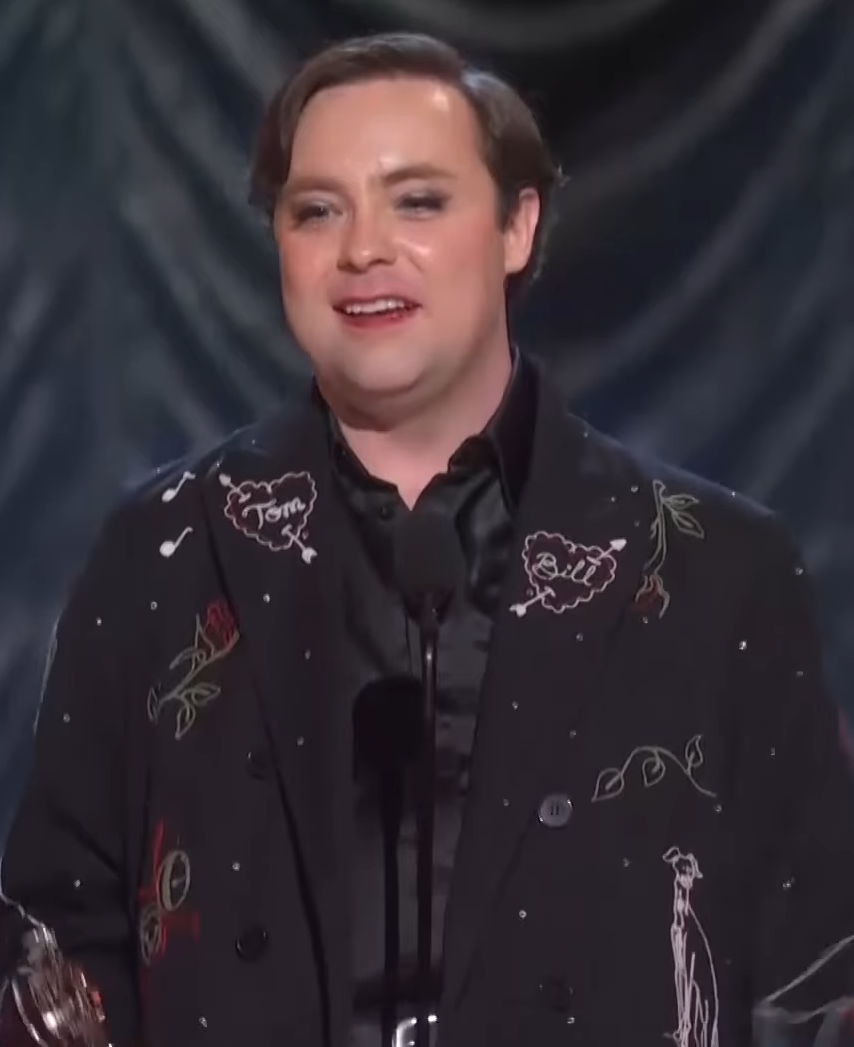
Jak Malone won for Operation Mincemeat (2025)

=== 1940s ===
Year	Actor	Musical	Role(s)	Ref.
1947 (1st)
1947 (1st)	David Wayne	Finian's Rainbow	Og	

=== 1950s ===
Year	Actor	Musical	Role(s)	Ref.
1950 (4th)
1950 (4th)	Myron McCormick	South Pacific	Luther Billis	
1951 (5th)
1951 (5th)	Russell Nype	Call Me Madam	Kenneth Gibson	
1952 (6th)
1952 (6th)	Yul Brynner	The King and I	The King of Siam	
1953 (7th)
1953 (7th)	Hiram Sherman	Two's Company	Various Characters	
1954 (8th)
1954 (8th)	Harry Belafonte	John Murray Anderson's Almanac	Various Characters	
1955 (9th)
1955 (9th)	Cyril Ritchard	Peter Pan	Captain Hook / Mr. Darling	
1956 (10th)
1956 (10th)	Russ Brown	Damn Yankees	Benny Van Buren	
1956 (10th)	Mike Kellin	Pipe Dream	Hazel	
1956 (10th)	Will Mahoney	Finian's Rainbow	Finian McLonergan	
1956 (10th)	Scott Merrill	The Threepenny Opera	Macheath	
1957 (11th)
1957 (11th)	Sydney Chaplin	Bells Are Ringing	Jeff Moss	
1957 (11th)	Robert Coote	My Fair Lady	Colonel Pickering	
1957 (11th)	Stanley Holloway	My Fair Lady	Alfred P. Doolittle	
1958 (12th)
1958 (12th)	David Burns	The Music Man	Mayor Shinn	
1958 (12th)	Ossie Davis	Jamaica	Cicero	
1958 (12th)	Cameron Prud'Homme	New Girl in Town	Chris	
1958 (12th)	Iggie Wolfington	The Music Man	Marcellus Washburn	
1959 (13th)
1959 (13th)	Russell Nype (TIE)	Goldilocks	George Randolph Brown	
1959 (13th)	Leonard Stone (TIE)	Redhead	George Poppett	

=== 1960s ===
Year	Actor	Musical	Role(s)	Ref.
1960 (14th)
1960 (14th)	Tom Bosley	Fiorello!	Fiorello La Guardia	
1960 (14th)	Theodore Bikel	The Sound of Music	Captain Georg von Trapp	
1960 (14th)	Howard da Silva	Fiorello!	Ben Marino	
1960 (14th)	Kurt Kasznar	The Sound of Music	Max Detweiler	
1960 (14th)	Jack Klugman	Gypsy	Herbie	
1961 (15th)
1961 (15th)	Dick Van Dyke	Bye Bye Birdie	Albert Peterson	
1961 (15th)	Dick Gautier	Bye Bye Birdie	Conrad Birdie	
1961 (15th)	Ron Husmann	Tenderloin	Tommy	
1961 (15th)	Clive Revill	Irma La Douce	Bob-Le-Hotu	
1962 (16th)
1962 (16th)	Charles Nelson Reilly	How to Succeed in Business Without Really Trying	Bud Frump	
1962 (16th)	Orson Bean	Subways Are For Sleeping	Charlie Smith	
1962 (16th)	Severn Darden	From the Second City	Performer	
1962 (16th)	Pierre Olaf	Carnival	Jacquot	
1963 (17th)
1963 (17th)	David Burns	A Funny Thing Happened on the Way to the Forum	Senex	
1963 (17th)	Jack Gilford	A Funny Thing Happened on the Way to the Forum	Hysterium	
1963 (17th)	Davy Jones	Oliver!	The Artful Dodger	
1963 (17th)	Swen Swenson	Little Me	George Musgrove	
1964 (18th)
1964 (18th)	Jack Cassidy	She Loves Me	Stephen Kodaly	
1964 (18th)	Will Geer	110 in the Shade	H. C. Curry	
1964 (18th)	Danny Meehan	Funny Girl	Eddie Ryan	
1964 (18th)	Charles Nelson Reilly	Hello, Dolly!	Cornelius Hackl	
1965 (19th)
1965 (19th)	Victor Spinetti	Oh, What a Lovely War!	Various Characters	
1965 (19th)	Jack Cassidy	Fade Out – Fade In	Bryon Prong	
1965 (19th)	James Grout	Half a Sixpence	Chitterlow	
1965 (19th)	Jerry Orbach	Guys and Dolls	Sky Masterson	
1966 (20th)
1966 (20th)	Frankie Michaels	Mame	Patrick Dennis	
1966 (20th)	Roy Castle	Pickwick	Sam Weller	
1966 (20th)	John McMartin	Sweet Charity	Oscar	
1966 (20th)	Michael O'Sullivan	It's a Bird...It's a Plane...It's Superman	Dr. Abner Sedgwick	
1967 (21st)
1967 (21st)	Joel Grey	Cabaret	The Master of Ceremonies	
1967 (21st)	Leon Bibb	A Hand Is on the Gate	Performer	
1967 (21st)	Gordon Dilworth	Walking Happy	Tubby Wadlow	
1967 (21st)	Edward Winter	Cabaret	Ernst Ludwig	
1968 (22nd)
1968 (22nd)	Hiram Sherman	How Now, Dow Jones	Wingate	
1968 (22nd)	Scott Jacoby	Golden Rainbow	Ally	
1968 (22nd)	Nikos Kourkoulos	Illya Darling	Tonio	
1968 (22nd)	Michael Rupert	The Happy Time	Bibi Bonnard	
1969 (23rd)
1969 (23rd)	Ron Holgate	1776	Richard Henry Lee	
1969 (23rd)	William Daniels (nomination declined)	1776	John Adams	
1969 (23rd)	Larry Haines	Promises, Promises	Dr. Dreyfuss	
1969 (23rd)	Edward Winter	Promises, Promises	J.D. Sheldrake	

=== 1970s ===
Year	Actor	Musical	Role(s)	Ref.
1970 (24th)
1970 (24th)	René Auberjonois	Coco	Sebastian Baye	
1970 (24th)	Brandon Maggart	Applause	Buzz Richards	
1970 (24th)	George Rose	Coco	Louis Greff	
1971 (25th)
1971 (25th)	Keene Curtis	The Rothschilds	Various Characters	
1971 (25th)	Charles Kimbrough	Company	Harry	
1971 (25th)	Walter Willison	Two by Two	Japheth	
1972 (26th)
1972 (26th)	Larry Blyden	A Funny Thing Happened on the Way to the Forum	Hysterium	
1972 (26th)	Timothy Meyers	Grease	Kenickie	
1972 (26th)	Gene Nelson	Follies	Buddy Plummer	
1972 (26th)	Ben Vereen	Jesus Christ Superstar	Judas Iscariot	
1973 (27th)
1973 (27th)	George S. Irving	Irene	Madame Lucy	
1973 (27th)	Laurence Guittard	A Little Night Music	Count Carl-Magnus Malcolm	
1973 (27th)	Avon Long	Don't Play Us Cheap	David	
1973 (27th)	Gilbert Price	Lost in the Stars	Absalom Kumalo	
1974 (28th)
1974 (28th)	Tommy Tune	Seesaw	David	
1974 (28th)	Mark Baker	Candide	Candide	
1974 (28th)	Ralph Carter	Raisin	Travis Younger	
1975 (29th)
1975 (29th)	Ted Ross	The Wiz	The Cowardly Lion	
1975 (29th)	Tom Aldredge	Where's Charley?	Mr. Spettigue	
1975 (29th)	John Bottoms	Dance with Me	Jimmy Dick II	
1975 (29th)	Doug Henning	The Magic Show	Doug	
1975 (29th)	Gilbert Price	The Night That Made America Famous	Performer	
1975 (29th)	Richard B. Shull	Goodtime Charley	Minguet	
1976 (30th)
1976 (30th)	Sammy Williams	A Chorus Line	Paul San Marco	
1976 (30th)	Robert LuPone	A Chorus Line	Zach	
1976 (30th)	Charles Repole	Very Good Eddie	Mr. Eddie Kettle	
1976 (30th)	Isao Sato	Pacific Overtures	Kayama	
1977 (31st)
1977 (31st)	Lenny Baker	I Love My Wife	Alvin	
1977 (31st)	David Kernan	Side by Side by Sondheim	Performer	
1977 (31st)	Larry Marshall	Porgy and Bess	Sportin' Life	
1977 (31st)	Ned Sherrin	Side by Side by Sondheim	Performer	
1978 (32nd)
1978 (32nd)	Kevin Kline	On the Twentieth Century	Bruce Granit	
1978 (32nd)	Steven Boockvor	Working	John Fortune / Marco Camerone	
1978 (32nd)	Wayne Cilento	Dancin'	Performer	
1978 (32nd)	Rex Everhart	Working	Herb Rosen / Booker Page	
1979 (33rd)
1979 (33rd)	Henderson Forsythe	The Best Little Whorehouse in Texas	Sheriff Ed Earl Dodd	
1979 (33rd)	Richard Cox	Platinum	Dan Danger	
1979 (33rd)	Gregory Hines	Eubie!	Performer	
1979 (33rd)	Ron Holgate	The Grand Tour	Colonel Tadeusz Boleslav Stjerbinsky	

=== 1980s ===
Year	Actor	Musical	Role(s)	Ref.
1980 (34th)
1980 (34th)	Mandy Patinkin	Evita	Che	
1980 (34th)	David Garrison	A Day in Hollywood / A Night in the Ukraine	Serge B. Samovar	
1980 (34th)	Harry Groener	Oklahoma!	Will Parker	
1980 (34th)	Bob Gunton	Evita	Juan Perón	
1981 (35th)
1981 (35th)	Hinton Battle	Sophisticated Ladies	Various Characters	
1981 (35th)	Tony Azito	The Pirates of Penzance	Sergeant of Police	
1981 (35th)	Lee Roy Reams	42nd Street	Billy Lawlor	
1981 (35th)	Paxton Whitehead	Camelot	King Pellinore	
1982 (36th)
1982 (36th)	Cleavant Derricks	Dreamgirls	James "Thunder" Early	
1982 (36th)	Obba Babatundé	Dreamgirls	C.C. White	
1982 (36th)	David Alan Grier	The First	Jackie Robinson	
1982 (36th)	Bill Hutton	Joseph and the Amazing Technicolor Dreamcoat	Joseph	
1983 (37th)
1983 (37th)	Charles Coles	My One and Only	Mr. Magix	
1983 (37th)	Harry Groener	Cats	Munkustrap	
1983 (37th)	Stephen Hanan	Cats	Bustopher Jones / Asparagus / Growltiger	
1983 (37th)	Lara Teeter	On Your Toes	Junior	
1984 (38th)
1984 (38th)	Hinton Battle	The Tap Dance Kid	Dipsey	
1984 (38th)	Stephen Geoffreys	The Human Comedy	Homer	
1984 (38th)	Todd Graff	Baby	Danny	
1984 (38th)	Samuel E. Wright	The Tap Dance Kid	William	
1985 (39th)
1985 (39th)	Ron Richardson	Big River	Jim	
1985 (39th)	René Auberjonois	Big River	The Duke	
1985 (39th)	Daniel Jenkins	Big River	Huckleberry Finn	
1985 (39th)	Kurt Knudson	Take Me Along	Sid Davis	
1986 (40th)
1986 (40th)	Michael Rupert	Sweet Charity	Oscar	
1986 (40th)	Christopher d'Amboise	Song and Dance	Joe	
1986 (40th)	John Herrera	The Mystery of Edwin Drood	Neville Landless / Mr. Victor Grinstead	
1986 (40th)	Howard McGillin	The Mystery of Edwin Drood	John Jasper / Mr. Clive Paget	
1987 (41st)
1987 (41st)	Michael Maguire	Les Misérables	Enjolras	
1987 (41st)	George S. Irving	Me and My Girl	Sir John Tremayne	
1987 (41st)	Timothy Jerome	Me and My Girl	Herbert Parchester	
1987 (41st)	Robert Torti	Starlight Express	Greaseball	
1988 (42nd)
1988 (42nd)	Bill McCutcheon	Anything Goes	Moonface Martin	
1988 (42nd)	Anthony Heald	Anything Goes	Lord Evelyn Oakleigh	
1988 (42nd)	Werner Klemperer	Cabaret	Herr Schultz	
1988 (42nd)	Robert Westenberg	Into the Woods	The Wolf / Cinderella's Prince	
1989 (43rd)
1989 (43rd)	Scott Wise	Jerome Robbins' Broadway	Various Characters	
1989 (43rd)	Bunny Briggs	Black and Blue	Hoofer	
1989 (43rd)	Savion Glover	Black and Blue	Younger Generation	
1989 (43rd)	Scott Wentworth	Welcome to the Club	Aaron Bates	

=== 1990s ===
Year	Actor	Musical	Role(s)	Ref.
1990 (44th)
1990 (44th)	Michael Jeter	Grand Hotel	Otto Kringelein	
1990 (44th)	René Auberjonois	City of Angels	Buddy Fiddler / Irwin S. Irving	
1990 (44th)	Kevin Colson	Aspects of Love	George Dillingham	
1990 (44th)	Jonathan Hadary	Gypsy	Herbie	
1991 (45th)
1991 (45th)	Hinton Battle	Miss Saigon	John	
1991 (45th)	Bruce Adler	Those Were the Days	Various Characters	
1991 (45th)	Gregg Burge	Oh, Kay!	Billy Lyes	
1991 (45th)	Willy Falk	Miss Saigon	Chris	
1992 (46th)
1992 (46th)	Scott Waara	The Most Happy Fella	Herman	
1992 (46th)	Bruce Adler	Crazy for You	Bela Zangler	
1992 (46th)	Keith David	Jelly's Last Jam	Chimney Man	
1992 (46th)	Jonathan Kaplan	Falsettos	Jason	
1993 (47th)
1993 (47th)	Anthony Crivello	Kiss of the Spider Woman	Valentin Arregui Paz	
1993 (47th)	Michael Cerveris	The Who's Tommy	Tommy	
1993 (47th)	Gregg Edelman	Anna Karenina	Constantin Levin	
1993 (47th)	Paul Kandel	The Who's Tommy	Uncle Ernie	
1994 (48th)
1994 (48th)	Jarrod Emick	Damn Yankees	Joe Hardy	
1994 (48th)	Tom Aldredge	Passion	Dr. Tambourri	
1994 (48th)	Gary Beach	Beauty and the Beast	Lumière	
1994 (48th)	Jonathan Freeman	She Loves Me	Headwaiter	
1995 (49th)
1995 (49th)	George Hearn	Sunset Boulevard	Max Von Mayerling	
1995 (49th)	Michel Bell	Show Boat	Joe	
1995 (49th)	Joel Blum	Show Boat	Frank	
1995 (49th)	Victor Trent Cook	Smokey Joe's Cafe	Various Characters	
1996 (50th)
1996 (50th)	Wilson Jermaine Heredia	Rent	Angel Dumott Schunard	
1996 (50th)	Lewis J. Stadlen	A Funny Thing Happened on the Way to the Forum	Senex	
1996 (50th)	Brett Tabisel	Big	Billy	
1996 (50th)	Scott Wise	State Fair	Pat Gilbert	
1997 (51st)
1997 (51st)	Chuck Cooper	The Life	Memphis	
1997 (51st)	Joel Blum	Steel Pier	Buddy Becker	
1997 (51st)	André De Shields	Play On!	Jester	
1997 (51st)	Sam Harris	The Life	Jojo	
1998 (52nd)
1998 (52nd)	Ron Rifkin	Cabaret	Herr Schultz	
1998 (52nd)	Gregg Edelman	1776	Edward Rutledge	
1998 (52nd)	John McMartin	High Society	Uncle Willie	
1998 (52nd)	Samuel E. Wright	The Lion King	Mufasa	
1999 (53rd)
1999 (53rd)	Roger Bart	You're a Good Man, Charlie Brown	Snoopy	
1999 (53rd)	Desmond Richardson	Fosse	Various Characters	
1999 (53rd)	Ron Taylor	It Ain't Nothin' But the Blues	Various Characters	
1999 (53rd)	Scott Wise	Fosse	Various Characters	

=== 2000s ===
Year	Actor	Musical	Role(s)	Ref.
2000 (54th)
2000 (54th)	Boyd Gaines	Contact	Michael Wiley	
2000 (54th)	Michael Berresse	Kiss Me, Kate	Bill Calhoun / Lucentio	
2000 (54th)	Michael Mulheren	Kiss Me, Kate	Second Man	
2000 (54th)	Stephen Spinella	James Joyce's The Dead	Freddy Malins	
2000 (54th)	Lee Wilkof	Kiss Me, Kate	First Man	
2001 (55th)
2001 (55th)	Gary Beach	The Producers	Roger DeBris	
2001 (55th)	Roger Bart	The Producers	Carmen Ghia	
2001 (55th)	John Ellison Conlee	The Full Monty	Dave Butatinsky	
2001 (55th)	André De Shields	The Full Monty	Noah "Horse" T. Simmons	
2001 (55th)	Brad Oscar	The Producers	Franz Liebkind	
2002 (56th)
2002 (56th)	Shuler Hensley	Oklahoma!	Jud Fry	
2002 (56th)	Norbert Leo Butz	Thou Shalt Not	Camille Raquin	
2002 (56th)	Gregg Edelman	Into the Woods	The Wolf / Cinderella's Prince	
2002 (56th)	Brian d'Arcy James	Sweet Smell of Success	Sidney Falco	
2002 (56th)	Marc Kudisch	Thoroughly Modern Millie	Trevor Graydon	
2003 (57th)
2003 (57th)	Dick Latessa	Hairspray	Wilbur Turnblad	
2003 (57th)	Michael Cavanaugh	Movin' Out	Piano Man	
2003 (57th)	John Dossett	Gypsy	Herbie	
2003 (57th)	Corey Reynolds	Hairspray	Seaweed J. Stubbs	
2003 (57th)	Keith Roberts	Movin' Out	Tony	
2004 (58th)
2004 (58th)	Michael Cerveris	Assassins	John Wilkes Booth	
2004 (58th)	John Cariani	Fiddler on the Roof	Motel Kamzoil	
2004 (58th)	Raúl Esparza	Taboo	Philip Salon	
2004 (58th)	Michael McElroy	Big River	Jim	
2004 (58th)	Denis O'Hare	Assassins	Charles Guiteau	
2005 (59th)
2005 (59th)	Dan Fogler	The 25th Annual Putnam County Spelling Bee	William Barfée	
2005 (59th)	Marc Kudisch	Chitty Chitty Bang Bang	Baron Bomburst	
2005 (59th)	Michael McGrath	Spamalot	Patsy	
2005 (59th)	Matthew Morrison	The Light in the Piazza	Fabrizio Nacarelli	
2005 (59th)	Christopher Sieber	Spamalot	Sir Galahad	
2006 (60th)
2006 (60th)	Christian Hoff	Jersey Boys	Tommy DeVito	
2006 (60th)	Danny Burstein	The Drowsy Chaperone	Aldolpho	
2006 (60th)	Jim Dale	The Threepenny Opera	Mr. Peachum	
2006 (60th)	Brandon Victor Dixon	The Color Purple	Harpo	
2006 (60th)	Manoel Felciano	Sweeney Todd: The Demon Barber of Fleet Street	Tobias Ragg	
2007 (61st)
2007 (61st)	John Gallagher Jr.	Spring Awakening	Moritz Stiefel	
2007 (61st)	Brooks Ashmanskas	Martin Short: Fame Becomes Me	Various Characters	
2007 (61st)	Christian Borle	Legally Blonde The Musical	Emmett Forrest	
2007 (61st)	John Cullum	110 in the Shade	H.C. Curry	
2007 (61st)	David Pittu	LoveMusik	Bertolt Brecht	
2008 (62nd)
2008 (62nd)	Boyd Gaines	Gypsy	Herbie	
2008 (62nd)	Daniel Breaker	Passing Strange	Youth	
2008 (62nd)	Danny Burstein	Rodgers & Hammerstein's South Pacific	Luther Billis	
2008 (62nd)	Robin de Jesús	In the Heights	Sonny	
2008 (62nd)	Christopher Fitzgerald	The New Mel Brooks Musical Young Frankenstein	Igor	
2009 (63rd)
2009 (63rd)	Gregory Jbara	Billy Elliot the Musical	Dad	
2009 (63rd)	David Bologna	Billy Elliot the Musical	Michael Caffrey	
2009 (63rd)	Marc Kudisch	9 to 5	Franklin Hart Jr.	
2009 (63rd)	Christopher Sieber	Shrek the Musical	Lord Farquaad	
2009 (63rd)	Will Swenson	Hair	George Berger	

=== 2010s ===
Year	Actor	Musical	Role(s)	Ref.
2010 (64th)
2010 (64th)	Levi Kreis	Million Dollar Quartet	Jerry Lee Lewis	
2010 (64th)	Kevin Chamberlin	The Addams Family	Uncle Fester	
2010 (64th)	Robin de Jesús	La Cage aux Folles	Jacob	
2010 (64th)	Christopher Fitzgerald	Finian's Rainbow	Og	
2010 (64th)	Bobby Steggert	Ragtime	Mother's Younger Brother	
2011 (65th)
2011 (65th)	John Larroquette	How to Succeed in Business Without Really Trying	J.B. Biggley	
2011 (65th)	Colman Domingo	The Scottsboro Boys	Mr. Bones	
2011 (65th)	Adam Godley	Anything Goes	Lord Evelyn Oakleigh	
2011 (65th)	Forrest McClendon	The Scottsboro Boys	Mr. Tambo	
2011 (65th)	Rory O'Malley	The Book of Mormon	Elder McKinley / Moroni	
2012 (66th)
2012 (66th)	Michael McGrath	Nice Work If You Can Get It	Cookie McGee	
2012 (66th)	Phillip Boykin	Porgy and Bess	Crown	
2012 (66th)	Michael Cerveris	Evita	Juan Perón	
2012 (66th)	David Alan Grier	Porgy and Bess	Sporting Life	
2012 (66th)	Josh Young	Jesus Christ Superstar	Judas Iscariot	
2013 (67th)
2013 (67th)	Gabriel Ebert	Matilda the Musical	Mr. Wormwood	
2013 (67th)	Charl Brown	Motown: The Musical	Smokey Robinson	
2013 (67th)	Keith Carradine	Hands on a Hardbody	JD Drew	
2013 (67th)	Will Chase	The Mystery of Edwin Drood	John Jasper / Mr. Clive Paget	
2013 (67th)	Terrence Mann	Pippin	King Charles	
2014 (68th)
2014 (68th)	James Monroe Iglehart	Aladdin	Genie	
2014 (68th)	Danny Burstein	Cabaret	Herr Schultz	
2014 (68th)	Nick Cordero	Bullets Over Broadway	Cheech	
2014 (68th)	Joshua Henry	Violet	Flick	
2014 (68th)	Jarrod Spector	Beautiful: The Carole King Musical	Barry Mann	
2015 (69th)
2015 (69th)	Christian Borle	Something Rotten!	William Shakespeare	
2015 (69th)	Andy Karl	On the Twentieth Century	Bruce Granit	
2015 (69th)	Brad Oscar	Something Rotten!	Nostradamus	
2015 (69th)	Brandon Uranowitz	An American in Paris	Adam Hochberg	
2015 (69th)	Max von Essen	An American in Paris	Henri Baurel	
2016 (70th)
2016 (70th)	Daveed Diggs	Hamilton	Marquis de Lafayette / Thomas Jefferson	
2016 (70th)	Brandon Victor Dixon	Shuffle Along	Eubie Blake	
2016 (70th)	Christopher Fitzgerald	Waitress	Ogie Anhorn	
2016 (70th)	Jonathan Groff	Hamilton	King George III	
2016 (70th)	Christopher Jackson	Hamilton	George Washington	
2017 (71st)
2017 (71st)	Gavin Creel	Hello, Dolly!	Cornelius Hackl	
2017 (71st)	Mike Faist	Dear Evan Hansen	Connor Murphy	
2017 (71st)	Andrew Rannells	Falsettos	Whizzer Brown	
2017 (71st)	Lucas Steele	Natasha, Pierre & The Great Comet of 1812	Anatole Kuragin	
2017 (71st)	Brandon Uranowitz	Falsettos	Mendel Weisenbachfeld	
2018 (72nd)
2018 (72nd)	Ari'el Stachel	The Band's Visit	Haled	
2018 (72nd)	Norbert Leo Butz	My Fair Lady	Alfred P. Doolittle	
2018 (72nd)	Alexander Gemignani	Carousel	Enoch Snow	
2018 (72nd)	Grey Henson	Mean Girls	Damian Hubbard	
2018 (72nd)	Gavin Lee	SpongeBob SquarePants	Squidward Tentacles	
2019 (73rd)
2019 (73rd)	André De Shields	Hadestown	Hermes	
2019 (73rd)	Andy Grotelueschen	Tootsie	Jeff Slater	
2019 (73rd)	Patrick Page	Hadestown	Hades	
2019 (73rd)	Jeremy Pope	Ain't Too Proud	Eddie Kendricks	
2019 (73rd)	Ephraim Sykes	Ain't Too Proud	David Ruffin	

=== 2020s ===
Year	Actor	Musical	Role(s)
2020 (74th)
2020 (74th)	Danny Burstein	Moulin Rouge! The Musical	Harold Zidler
2020 (74th)	Derek Klena	Jagged Little Pill	Nick Healy
2020 (74th)	Sean Allan Krill	Jagged Little Pill	Steve Healy
2020 (74th)	Sahr Ngaujah	Moulin Rouge! The Musical	Henri de Toulouse-Lautrec
2020 (74th)	Daniel J. Watts	Tina: The Tina Turner Musical	Ike Turner
2022 (75th)
2022 (75th)	Matt Doyle	Company	Jamie
2022 (75th)	Sidney DuPont	Paradise Square	Washington Henry
2022 (75th)	Jared Grimes	Funny Girl	Eddie Ryan
2022 (75th)	John-Andrew Morrison	A Strange Loop	Thought 4
2022 (75th)	A.J. Shively	Paradise Square	Owen Duignan
2023 (76th)
2023 (76th)	Alex Newell	Shucked	Lulu
2023 (76th)	Kevin Cahoon	Shucked	Peanut
2023 (76th)	Justin Cooley	Kimberly Akimbo	Seth Weetis
2023 (76th)	Kevin Del Aguila	Some Like It Hot	Osgood Fielding III
2023 (76th)	Jordan Donica	Lerner & Loewe's Camelot	Lancelot
2024 (77th)
2024 (77th)	Daniel Radcliffe	Merrily We Roll Along	Charley Kringas
2024 (77th)	Roger Bart	Back to the Future: The Musical	Doc Brown
2024 (77th)	Joshua Boone	The Outsiders	Dallas Winston
2024 (77th)	Brandon Victor Dixon	Hell's Kitchen	Davis
2024 (77th)	Sky Lakota-Lynch	The Outsiders	Johnny Cade
2024 (77th)	Steven Skybell	Cabaret at the Kit Kat Club	Herr Schultz
2025 (78th)
2025 (78th)	Jak Malone	Operation Mincemeat: A New Musical	Hester Leggatt and others
2025 (78th)	Brooks Ashmanskas	SMASH	Nigel Davies
2025 (78th)	Jeb Brown	Dead Outlaw	Bandleader / Walter Jarrett
2025 (78th)	Danny Burstein	Gypsy	Herbie
2025 (78th)	Taylor Trensch	Floyd Collins	Skeets Miller
2026 (79th)
2026 (79th)	Ali Louis Bourzgui	The Lost Boys	David
2026 (79th)	André De Shields	Cats: The Jellicle Ball	Old Deuteronomy
2026 (79th)	Bryce Pinkham	Chess	The Arbiter
2026 (79th)	Ben Levi Ross	Ragtime	Mother's Younger Brother
2026 (79th)	Layton Williams	Titanique	Iceberg / The Seaman

== Most wins ==
3 wins

- Hinton Battle

2 wins

- David Burns
- Boyd Gaines
- Russell Nype
- Hiram Sherman

== Most nominations ==
5 nominations

- Danny Burstein

4 nominations

- André De Shields

3 nominations

- René Auberjonois
- Roger Bart
- Hinton Battle
- Michael Cerveris
- Brandon Victor Dixon
- Gregg Edelman
- Christopher Fitzgerald
- Marc Kudisch
- Scott Wise

2 nominations

- Bruce Adler
- Tom Aldredge
- Brooks Ashmanskas
- Gary Beach
- Joel Blum
- Christian Borle
- David Burns
- Norbert Leo Butz
- Jack Cassidy
- Robin de Jesús
- Boyd Gaines
- David Alan Grier
- Harry Groener
- Ron Holgate
- George S. Irving
- Michael McGrath
- John McMartin
- Russell Nype
- Brad Oscar
- Gilbert Price
- Charles Nelson Reilly
- Michael Rupert
- Hiram Sherman
- Christopher Sieber
- Brandon Uranowitz
- Edward Winter
- Samuel E. Wright

== Character nomination total ==
5 nominations

- Herbie from Gypsy

4 nominations

- Herr Schultz from Cabaret

2 nominations

- Alfred P. Doolittle from My Fair Lady
- Bruce Granit from On the Twentieth Century
- Cinderella's Prince / The Wolf from Into the Woods
- Cornelius Hackl from Hello, Dolly!
- Eddie Ryan from Funny Girl
- H.C. Curry from 110 in the Shade
- Hysterium from A Funny Thing Happened on the Way to the Forum
- Jim from Big River
- John Jasper / Mr. Clive Paget from The Mystery of Edwin Drood
- Juan Perón from Evita
- Judas Iscariot from Jesus Christ Superstar
- Lord Evelyn Oakleigh from Anything Goes
- Luther Billis from South Pacific
- Mother's Younger Brother from Ragtime
- Og from Finian's Rainbow
- Oscar from Sweet Charity
- Senex from A Funny Thing Happened on the Way to the Forum
- Sporting Life from Porgy and Bess

== Productions with multiple nominations ==
boldface=winner

- My Fair Lady – Robert Coote and Stanley Holloway
- The Music Man – **David Burns** and Iggie Wolfington
- Fiorello! – **Tom Bosley** and Howard da Silva
- The Sound of Music – Theodore Bikel and Kurt Kasznar
- Bye Bye Birdie – Dick Gautier and **Dick Van Dyke**
- A Funny Thing Happened on the Way to the Forum – **David Burns** and Jack Gilford
- Cabaret – **Joel Grey** and Edward Winter
- 1776 – William Daniels (refused nomination) and **Ronald Holgate**
- Promises, Promises – Larry Haines and Edward Winter
- Coco – **René Auberjonois** and George Rose
- A Chorus Line – Robert LuPone and **Sammy Williams**
- Side by Side by Sondheim – David Kernan and Ned Sherrin
- Working – Steven Boockvor and Rex Everhart
- Evita – Bob Gunton and **Mandy Patinkin**
- Dreamgirls – Obba Babatundé and **Cleavant Derricks**
- Cats – Harry Groener and Stephen Hanan
- The Tap Dance Kid – **Hinton Battle** and Samuel E. Wright
- Big River – René Auberjonois, Daniel H. Jenkins and **Ron Richardson**
- The Mystery of Edwin Drood – John Herrera and Howard McGillin
- Me and My Girl – George S. Irving and Timothy Jerome
- Anything Goes – Anthony Heald and **Bill McCutcheon**
- Black and Blue – Bunny Briggs and Savion Glover
- Miss Saigon – **Hinton Battle** and Willy Falk
- The Who's Tommy – Michael Cerveris and Paul Kandel
- Show Boat – Michel Bell and Joel Blum
- The Life – **Chuck Cooper** and Sam Harris
- Fosse – Desmond Richardson and Scott Wise
- Kiss Me, Kate – Michael Berresse, Michael Mulheren and Lee Wilkof
- The Full Monty – John Ellison Conlee and André DeShields
- The Producers – Roger Bart, **Gary Beach** and Brad Oscar
- Hairspray – **Dick Latessa** and Corey Reynolds
- Movin' Out – Michael Cavanaugh and Keith Roberts
- Assassins – **Michael Cerveris** and Denis O'Hare
- Monty Python's Spamalot – Michael McGrath and Christopher Sieber
- Billy Elliot the Musical – David Bologna and **Gregory Jbara**
- The Scottsboro Boys – Colman Domingo and Forrest McClendon
- The Gershwins' Porgy and Bess – Phillip Boykin and David Alan Grier
- An American in Paris – Brandon Uranowitz and Max von Essen
- Something Rotten! – **Christian Borle** and Brad Oscar
- Hamilton – **Daveed Diggs**, Jonathan Groff and Christopher Jackson
- Falsettos – Andrew Rannells and Brandon Uranowitz
- Ain't Too Proud – Jeremy Pope and Ephraim Sykes
- Hadestown – **André De Shields** and Patrick Page
- Moulin Rouge! The Musical – **Danny Burstein** and Sahr Ngaujah
- Jagged Little Pill – Derek Klena and Sean Allan Krill
- Paradise Square – Sidney DuPont and A.J. Shively
- Shucked – Kevin Cahoon and **Alex Newell**
- The Outsiders – Joshua Boone and Sky Lakota-Lynch

== Multiple awards and nominations ==
Actors who have been nominated multiple times in any acting categories

Awards	Nominations	Recipient
4	7	Frank Langella
4	5	Boyd Gaines
3	7	Nathan Lane
3	7	John Lithgow
3	5	Mark Rylance
3	4	Kevin Kline
3	4	Zero Mostel
3	3	Hinton Battle
2	7	Christopher Plummer
2	6	Michael Cerveris
2	5	Christian Borle
2	5	George Hearn
2	5	George Rose
2	5	John Cullum
2	5	Robert Morse
2	4	James Earl Jones
2	4	Norbert Leo Butz
2	4	Richard Kiley
2	3	Al Pacino
2	3	David Burns
2	3	David Wayne
2	3	Fredric March
2	3	Judd Hirsch
2	3	Matthew Broderick
2	3	Phil Silvers
2	3	Rex Harrison
2	3	Robert Preston
2	3	Stephen Spinella
2	3	Walter Matthau
2	2	Alan Bates
2	2	Brian Dennehy
2	2	Bryan Cranston
2	2	Harvey Fierstein
2	2	Hiram Sherman
2	2	James Naughton
2	2	Jonathan Pryce
2	2	José Ferrer
2	2	Russell Nype
2	2	Tommy Tune
1	9	Danny Burstein
1	8	Jason Robards
1	7	Brian Bedford
1	6	Philip Bosco
1	5	Brandon Uranowitz
1	5	Brían F. O'Byrne
1	5	Hume Cronyn
1	5	Jim Dale
1	4	André De Shields
1	4	Billy Crudup
1	4	Brian Stokes Mitchell
1	4	Cyril Ritchard
1	4	David Alan Grier
1	4	Gregory Hines
1	4	Jack Cassidy
1	4	Joel Grey
1	4	Jonathan Groff
1	4	Joshua Henry
1	4	Liev Schreiber
1	4	René Auberjonois
1	4	Tony Shalhoub
1	3	Alfred Drake
1	3	Barry Bostwick
1	3	Courtney B. Vance
1	3	David Hyde Pierce
1	3	Gary Beach
1	3	Gavin Creel
1	3	George Grizzard
1	3	Jefferson Mays
1	3	Jerry Orbach
1	3	John Wood
1	3	Larry Blyden
1	3	Len Cariou
1	3	Mandy Patinkin
1	3	Michael Rupert
1	3	Richard Burton
1	3	Robert Sean Leonard
1	3	Roger Bart
1	3	Ruben Santiago-Hudson
1	3	Scott Wise
1	2	Alfred Lunt
1	2	Andrew Garfield
1	2	Barnard Hughes
1	2	Ben Vereen
1	2	Ben Platt
1	2	Bert Lahr
1	2	Bertie Carvel
1	2	Bill Irwin
1	2	Brent Carver
1	2	Charles Nelson Reilly
1	2	Chuck Cooper
1	2	Cleavant Derricks
1	2	Cliff Gorman
1	2	Daniel Radcliffe
1	2	Denzel Washington
1	2	Derek Jacobi
1	2	Eddie Redmayne
1	2	Edward Herrmann
1	2	Fritz Weaver
1	2	Gabriel Ebert
1	2	George S. Irving
1	2	Henry Fonda
1	2	Hugh Jackman
1	2	Ian McKellen
1	2	Jack Albertson
1	2	James Monroe Iglehart
1	2	Jeffrey Wright
1	2	John Benjamin Hickey
1	2	John Glover
1	2	Kevin Spacey
1	2	Laurence Fishburne
1	2	Leslie Odom Jr.
1	2	Martin Short
1	2	Michael Gough
1	2	Michael McGrath
1	2	Paul Rogers
1	2	Ralph Fiennes
1	2	Ray Bolger
1	2	Reed Birney
1	2	Roger Rees
1	2	Roger Robinson
1	2	Ron Holgate
1	2	Roy Dotrice
1	2	Santino Fontana
1	2	Sean Hayes
1	2	Simon Russell Beale
1	2	Sydney Chaplin
1	2	Zakes Mokae

Nominations	Recipient
5	Brian d'Arcy James
5	George C. Scott
5	John McMartin
5	Tom Aldredge
4	Donald Pleasence
4	Gregg Edelman
4	Raúl Esparza
4	Raul Julia
4	Victor Garber
3	Alan Alda
3	Alec McCowen
3	Alfred Molina
3	Andy Karl
3	Ben Gazzara
3	Brandon Victor Dixon
3	Brian Murray
3	Brooks Ashmanskas
3	Christopher Fitzgerald
3	Gilbert Price
3	Harry Groener
3	Jeff Daniels
3	Joseph Maher
3	Joshua Henry
3	Kevin Chamberlin
3	Marc Kudisch
3	Philip Seymour Hoffman
3	Ralph Richardson
3	Robin de Jesús
3	Terrence Mann
3	Tim Curry
3	Željko Ivanek
2	Adam Godley
2	Alan Rickman
2	Albert Finney
2	Alex Brightman
2	Andrew Rannells
2	Andy Griffith
2	Anthony Heald
2	Anthony Perkins
2	Arian Moayed
2	Biff McGuire
2	Bob Gunton
2	Bobby Cannavale
2	Brad Oscar
2	Bruce Adler
2	Bryce Pinkham
2	Charles Brown
2	Charles S. Dutton
2	Christopher Sieber
2	Christopher Walken
2	Clive Revill
2	Conleth Hill
2	Corey Hawkins
2	David Carroll
2	David Morse
2	David Pittu
2	David Threlfall
2	Dick Anthony Williams
2	Donald Moffat
2	Edward Petherbridge
2	Edward Winter
2	Gabriel Byrne
2	Gary Sinise
2	Gavin Lee
2	Herschel Bernardi
2	Howard McGillin
2	Jack Gilford
2	Jack Lemmon
2	Jeremy Jordan
2	Jeremy Pope
2	Joe Mantello
2	Joel Blum
2	John Gielgud
2	Jon Michael Hill
2	Josh Groban
2	Jude Law
2	K. Todd Freeman
2	Keith Carradine
2	Larry Bryggman
2	Larry Haines
2	Lewis J. Stadlen
2	Liam Neeson
2	Lin-Manuel Miranda
2	Mark Strong
2	Maurice Evans
2	Maurice Hines
2	Michael Stuhlbarg
2	Milo O'Shea
2	Nicol Williamson
2	Patrick Wilson
2	Peter Frechette
2	Richard Thomas
2	Rob McClure
2	Robert Prosky
2	Robert Weede
2	Samuel Barnett
2	Samuel E. Wright
2	Savion Glover
2	Stark Sands
2	Stephen McKinley Henderson
2	Theodore Bikel
2	Tom Courtenay
2	Tom Sturridge
2	Tom Wopat
2	Tony Roberts
2	Wilfrid Hyde-White

== Other statistics ==
- There was one tie in the history of this category, in 1959.
- The role of Herbie in Gypsy holds the record for most nominations in this category with five:
  - 1960 – Jack Klugman
  - 1990 – Jonathan Hadary
  - 2003 – John Dossett
  - 2008 – Boyd Gaines (winner)
  - 2025 – Danny Burstein
- The role of Herr Schultz in Cabaret is the second most-nominated with four:
  - 1988 – Werner Klemperer
  - 1998 – Ron Rifkin (winner)
  - 2014 – Danny Burstein
  - 2024 – Steven Skybell
- Hinton Battle remains the most successful performer in the history of this category with a perfect score of three wins in three nominations. Danny Burstein has received the most nominations in this category with five, but has only been victorious once. Gregg Edelman, Marc Kudisch, and Christopher Fitzgerald have received three nominations but never won and are this category's biggest "losers." Coincidentally, Edelman and Kudisch were nominated and lost to Shuler Hensley in 2002.
- There has never been a consecutive winner in this category. There have been, though, some consecutive nominations. Jack Cassidy was consecutively nominated in 1964 and 1965, while Bruce Adler achieved the same honor in 1991 and 1992. Cassidy won in 1964, for his portrayal of Steve Kodaly, in She Loves Me.
- The record for the longest span between wins is held by Hiram Sherman, whose wins for Two's Company, in 1953, and How Now, Dow Jones, in 1968, are set apart by 15 years.
- The record for the longest span between nominations is held by John McMartin, whose nominations for Sweet Charity, in 1966, and High Society, in 1998, are set apart by 32 years. McMartin never won a Tony Award in this category.
- The oldest winner in this category is Dick Latessa who was 73 when he won for Hairspray in 2003. The youngest winner is Frankie Michaels who won for Mame in 1966 at age 11.

== See also ==
- Dorian Award for Outstanding Featured Performance in a Broadway Musical
- Drama Desk Award for Outstanding Featured Actor in a Musical
- Drama Desk Award for Outstanding Featured Performance in a Musical
- Drama League Award for Distinguished Performance
- Laurence Olivier Award for Best Actor in a Supporting Role in a Musical
- Lists of acting awards
- List of awards for supporting actor
- Outer Critics Circle Award for Outstanding Featured Performer in a Broadway Musical
