= Rosalie King =

American actress

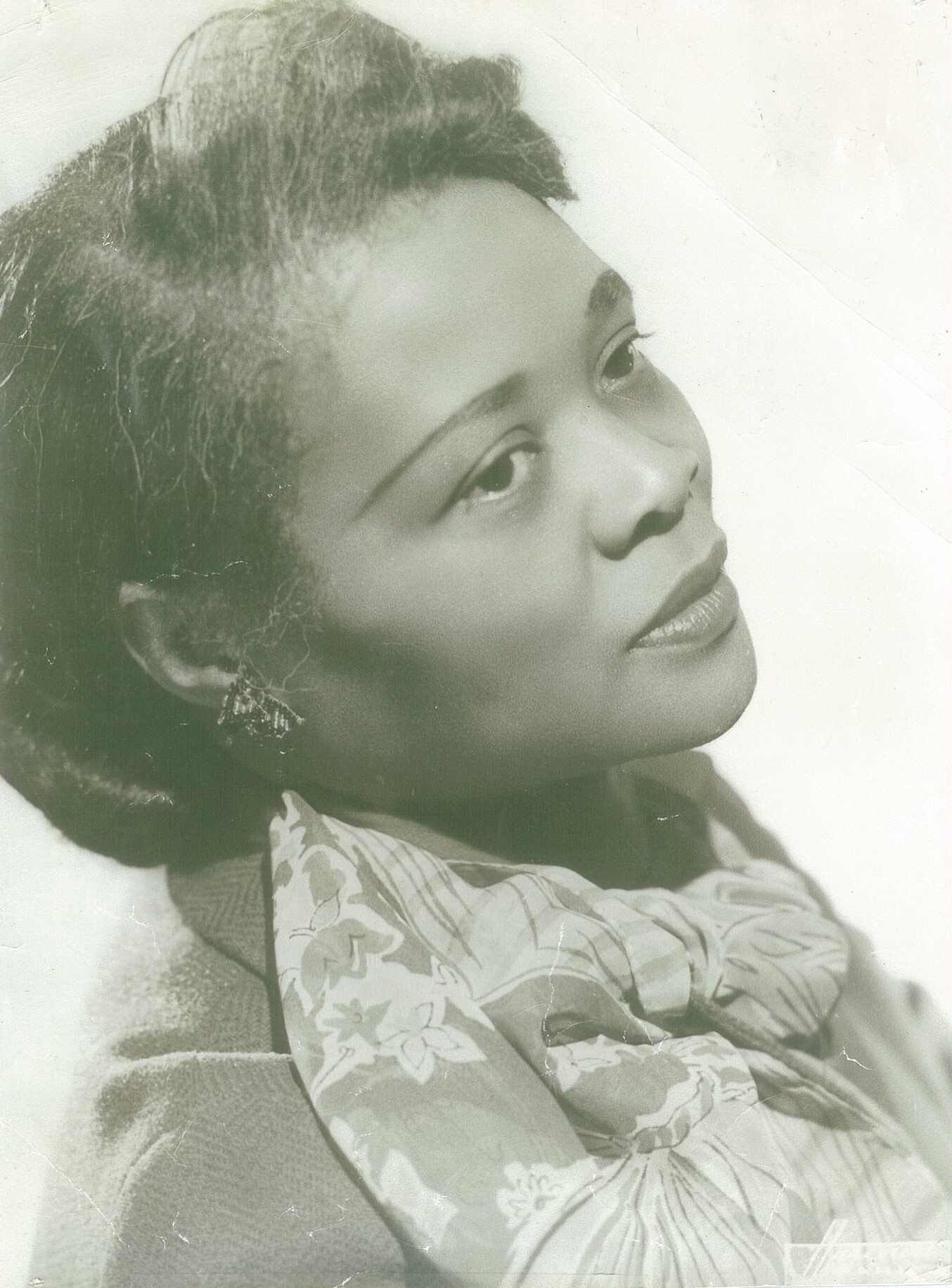
- Born: Rosa Lea Frances Stephens; August 23, 1902; Jacksonville, Florida
- Died: September 11, 1997 (aged 95); Ocala, Florida
- Other names: Rosalie Simpson
- Occupation(s): Stage actress, singer

Rosalie King (August 23, 1902 – June 11, 1997), also known as Rosalie Simpson, was an American character actress and singer.

She appeared on radio in The Maxwell House Coffee Hour. She was an original member of the Katherine Dunham Company, leaving because of the troupe's proposed tour of Australia and New Zealand (1956–1957), citing the distance from her children. The decision also cost the company the services of her husband, basso profondo Gordon Simpson, for which she later said that Dunham never fully forgave her. She also performed with the Eva Jessye Choir.

King was known for the timbre of her contralto voice. She became a favourite of playwright Langston Hughes, who wrote original material for her. She costarred in his play Jericho-Jim Crow in 1964.

King's career was cut short by a stroke in the mid-1960s. She recovered from it but retired from the stage, doing only occasional performances and consultancies in the 1970s and 1980s. In her later years, King was credited as Rosalie Simpson, her married name from her second marriage. Her stage credits are sometimes confused with those of her daughter, Rosalie King, Jr., a child actor turned educator. Rosalie King died in Ocala, Florida in 1997.

== Selected Broadway credits ==
- Lovely Ladies, Kind Gentlemen – 1971 – Okinawan/American
- Tambourines to Glory – 1963 – Mattie Morningside
- Porgy and Bess – original and 1942 revival
- Lew Leslie's Blackbirds of 1939
- Roll, Sweet Chariot – 1934
- Run, Little Chillun – 1933 – Sister Mahalie Ockletree
- Bal Nègre – 1946: Flaming Youth, 1927 – The Blues Singer
