= Jerico-Jim Crow =

1964 musical by Langston Hughes and William Hairston

- Original Off-Broadway Cast Album
- Music: Various
- Lyrics: Various
- Book: William Hairston; Langston Hughes
- Productions: 1964 Off-Broadway

Jerico-Jim Crow is a 1964 musical, with a book written by Langston Hughes and William Hairston. It was a pioneering work in the urban contemporary gospel musical style, based on the themes of the Civil Rights Movement in the United States. According to Hughes scholar and biographer Arnold Rampersad, Hughes "virtually pioneered" the black gospel musical, first with Black Nativity (1961) and then with Jericho-Jim Crow.

Jerico-Jim Crow premiered on Sunday, January 5, 1964, at the Sanctuary Theatre, New York City. It was co-directed by Alvin Ailey and William Hairston and conducted by Hugh Porter, with Marion Joseph Franklin, Jr as associate musical director and musical accompanist, the musical was favorably reviewed in The New York Times by Richard F. Shepard, who said: "This rousing production is an unabashedly sentimental and tuneful history of the Negro struggle up from slavery."

A cast recording was released in 1964 by Folkways Records.

== Original cast ==
- Joseph Attles
- William Cain
- Dorothy Drake
- Micki Grant
- Rosalie King
- Metrogene Myles
- Gilbert Price

== Songs ==
- "A Meeting Here Tonight"
- "I'm On My Way"
- "I Been 'Buked and I Been Scorned"
- "Such a Little King"
- "Is Massa Gwine to Sell Us Tomorrow?"
- "How Much Do You Want Me To Bear?"
- "Where Will I Lie Down?"
- "Follow the Drinkin' Gourd"
- "John Brown's Body"
- "The Battle Hymn of the Republic"
- "Slavery Chain Done Broke at Last"
- "Oh, Freedom"
- "Go Down, Moses"
- "Ezekiel Saw the Wheel"
- "Stay in the Field"
- "Freedom Land"
- "God's Gonna Cut You Down"
- "Better Leave Segregation Alone"
- "My Mind on Freedom"
- "We Shall Overcome"
- "The Battle of Old Jim Crow"
- "Come and Go With Me"
