= 39th Tony Awards =

1985 US theatrical awards ceremony

- Date: June 2, 1985
- Location: Shubert Theatre, New York City, New York
- Most wins: Big River (7)
- Most nominations: Big River (10)

Television/radio coverage
- Network: CBS

The 39th Annual Tony Awards was broadcast by CBS television on June 2, 1985, from the Shubert Theatre. Instead of a formal host, there was a group of performers/presenters. Some paid tribute to the songs of Jule Styne, Cy Coleman, Andrew Lloyd Webber, with these composers ending the broadcast by playing songs from their respective new shows. Mary Martin introduced the Special Award for Yul Brynner.

== Eligibility ==
Shows that opened on Broadway during the 1984–1985 season before May 9, 1985 are eligible.

Original plays

- Accidental Death of an Anarchist
- Alone Together
- As Is
- The Babe
- Biloxi Blues
- Dancing in the End Zone
- Doubles
- Home Front
- Hurlyburly
- Kipling
- The Loves of Anatol
- Ma Rainey's Black Bottom
- The Octette Bridge Club
- Pack of Lies
- Requiem for a Heavyweight

Original musicals

- André De Shields' Haarlem Nocturne
- Big River
- Grind
- Harrigan 'N Hart
- Leader of the Pack
- Quilters

Play revivals

- Aren't We All?
- Cyrano de Bergerac
- A Day in the Death of Joe Egg
- Design for Living
- Much Ado About Nothing
- Oedipus Rex
- Strange Interlude

Musical revivals

- The King and I
- Take Me Along
- The Three Musketeers
- The Wiz

== Nominations ==
The American Theatre Wing appointed an 11-member committee to determine the year's nominees. That committee was made up of:

- Jay Carr, Boston Globe theater critic
- William Glover, Associated Press theater critic
- George C. White, President of the O'Neill Theater Center
- Schuyler Chapin, Columbia University administrator
- George Cuttingham, Director of American Academy of Dramatic Arts
- David Oppenheim, Dean of the Tisch School at NYU
- Richard L. Coe, Washington Post theater critic
- Norris Houghton, academic
- Mary C. Henderson, academic
- Henry Hewes, founder of the American Theatre Critics Association
- Elliot Norton, Boston theater critic

=== Controversy ===
For the first time in the history of the Tonys, awards were not presented for Best Performance by a Leading Actor in a Musical, Best Performance by a Leading Actress in a Musical, or Best Choreography. According to The New York Times, it was the first time in the history of the awards that a category had been dropped. The Associated Press wrote that the best actress award was abandoned because the committee felt there was only valid nominee. The other two categories were also considered to have generally lackluster potential nominees.

== The ceremony ==
Musicals represented:

- Big River ("Muddy Water"/" River in the Rain"- Daniel Jenkins, Ron Richardson and Company)
- Grind ("This Must Be the Place" - Ben Vereen and Company)
- Leader of the Pack ("I Wanna Love Him So Bad/Do Wah Diddy" - Company)

Presenters and Performers: Danny Aiello, Susan Anton, Hinton Battle, Deborah Bauers, Deborah Burrell, Terry Burrell, Jim Dale, Loretta Devine, Jackie Gleason, Julie Harris, Rex Harrison, George Hearn, Van Johnson, Raul Julia, Rosetta LeNoire, Mary Martin, Millicent Martin, Maureen McGovern, Rita Moreno, Mike Nichols, Stefanie Powers, Juliet Prowse, Tony Randall, Lee Roy Reams, Lynn Redgrave, Chita Rivera, Wanda Richert, Tony Roberts, Rex Smith, Leslie Uggams, Dick Van Dyke, Ben Vereen, Tom Wopat, Elvira Santamaría

== Winners and nominees ==
Winners are in bold

Source: InfoPlease

Best Play	Best Musical
**Biloxi Blues – Neil Simon**; As Is – William M. Hoffman; Hurlyburly – David Rabe; Ma Rainey's Black Bottom – August Wilson	**Big River**; Grind; Leader of the Pack; Quilters
Best Revival	Best Book of a Musical
**A Day in the Death of Joe Egg**; Cyrano de Bergerac; Much Ado About Nothing; Strange Interlude	**William Hauptman – Big River**; Fay Kanin – Grind; Michael Stewart – Harrigan 'N Hart; Molly Newman and Barbara Damashek – Quilters
Best Performance by a Leading Actor in a Play	Best Performance by a Leading Actress in a Play
**Derek Jacobi – Much Ado About Nothing as Benedick**; Jim Dale – A Day in the Death of Joe Egg as Bri; Jonathan Hogan – As Is as Rich; John Lithgow – Requiem for a Heavyweight as Harlan "Mountain" McClintock	**Stockard Channing – A Day in the Death of Joe Egg as Sheila**; Sinéad Cusack – Much Ado About Nothing as Beatrice; Rosemary Harris – Pack of Lies as Barbara Jackson; Glenda Jackson – Strange Interlude as Nina Leeds
Best Performance by a Featured Actor in a Play	Best Performance by a Featured Actress in a Play
**Barry Miller – Biloxi Blues as Arnold Epstein**; Charles S. Dutton – Ma Rainey's Black Bottom as Levee; William Hurt – Hurlyburly as Eddie; Edward Petherbridge – Strange Interlude as Charles Marsden	**Judith Ivey – Hurlyburly as Bonnie**; Joanna Gleason – A Day in the Death of Joe Egg as Pam; Theresa Merritt – Ma Rainey's Black Bottom as Ma Rainey; Sigourney Weaver – Hurlyburly as Darlene
Best Performance by a Featured Actor in a Musical	Best Performance by a Featured Actress in a Musical
**Ron Richardson – Big River as Jim**; René Auberjonois – Big River as The Duke; Daniel H. Jenkins – Big River as Huckleberry Finn; Kurt Knudson – Take Me Along as Sid Davis	**Leilani Jones – Grind as Satin**; Evalyn Baron – Quilters as Daughter of the Frontier; Mary Beth Peil – The King and I as Anna Leonowens; Lenka Peterson – Quilters as Sarah
Best Direction of a Play	Best Direction of a Musical
**Gene Saks – Biloxi Blues**; Keith Hack – Strange Interlude; Terry Hands – Much Ado About Nothing; Marshall W. Mason – As Is	**Des McAnuff – Big River**; Barbara Damashek – Quilters; Mitch Leigh – The King and I; Harold Prince – Grind
Best Original Score (Music and/or Lyrics) Written for the Theatre	Best Scenic Design
**Big River – Roger Miller (music and lyrics)**; Grind – Larry Grossman (music) and Ellen Fitzhugh (lyrics); Quilters – Barbara Damashek (music and lyrics)	**Heidi Landesman – Big River**; Clarke Dunham – Grind; Ralph Koltai – Much Ado About Nothing; Voytek and Michael Levine – Strange Interlude
Best Costume Design	Best Lighting Design
**Florence Klotz – Grind**; Patricia McGourty – Big River; Alexander Reid – Cyrano de Bergerac; Alexander Reid – Much Ado About Nothing	**Richard Riddell – Big River**; Terry Hands – Cyrano de Bergerac; Terry Hands – Much Ado About Nothing; Allen Lee Hughes – Strange Interlude

== Special awards ==
- Regional Theatre Award - Steppenwolf Theatre Company, Chicago, Illinois
- Yul Brynner honoring his 4,525 performances in The King and I
- New York State Council on the Arts

=== Multiple nominations and awards ===
These productions had multiple nominations:

- 10 nominations: Big River
- 7 nominations: Grind and Much Ado About Nothing
- 6 nominations: Quilters and Strange Interlude
- 4 nominations: A Day in the Death of Joe Egg and Hurlyburly
- 3 nominations: As Is, Biloxi Blues, Cyrano de Bergerac, The King and I and Ma Rainey's Black Bottom

The following productions received multiple awards.

- 7 wins: Big River
- 3 wins: Biloxi Blues
- 2 wins: A Day in the Death of Joe Egg and Grind

== See also ==
- Drama Desk Awards
- 1985 Laurence Olivier Awards – equivalent awards for West End theatre productions
- Obie Award
- New York Drama Critics' Circle
- Theatre World Award
- Lucille Lortel Awards
