= Drama Desk Award for Outstanding Actor in a Musical =

Theater award

Drama Desk Award for Outstanding Actor
- Awarded for: Outstanding Actor in a Musical
- Location: New York City
- Country: United States
- Presented by: Drama Desk
- First award: 1975
- Final award: 2022
- Website: dramadesk.org (defunct)

The Drama Desk Award for Outstanding Actor in a Musical was an annual award presented by Drama Desk in recognition of achievements in theatre across collective Broadway, off-Broadway and off-off-Broadway productions in New York City. The award was one of eight new acting awards first presented in 1975, when Drama Desk retired an earlier award that had made no distinction between work in plays and musicals, nor between actors and actresses, nor between lead performers and featured performers.

After the 2022 ceremony, all eight acting categories introduced in 1975 were retired. The award for Outstanding Actor in a Musical, along with Outstanding Actress in a Musical, were replaced in 2023 with the gender neutral category of Outstanding Lead Performance in a Musical.

== Winners and nominees ==
Key

and bold indicates the winner.

=== 1970s ===
Year	Actor	Musical	Character
1975
1975	**John Cullum**	**Shenandoah**	**Charlie Anderson**
1975	Tim Curry	The Rocky Horror Show	Dr. Frank N. Furter
1975	Joel Grey	Goodtime Charley	Charley
1975	Raúl Juliá	Where's Charley?	Charley Wykeham
1976
1976	**Ian Richardson**	**My Fair Lady**	**Henry Higgins**
1976	Raúl Juliá	The Threepenny Opera	Macheath
1976	Jerry Orbach	Chicago	Billy Flynn
1976	Nicol Williamson	Rex	Henry VIII, King of England
1977
1977	**Lenny Baker**	**I Love My Wife**	**Alvin**
1977	Barry Bostwick	The Robber Bridegroom	Jamie Lockhart
1977	Yul Brynner	The King and I	The King of Siam
1977	Robert Guillaume	Guys and Dolls	Nathan Detroit
1977	Reid Shelton	Annie	Oliver Warbucks
1978
1978	**Ken Page**	**Ain't Misbehavin'**	**Performer**
1978	Gary Bayer	A History of the American Film	Jimmy
1978	Henderson Forsythe	The Best Little Whorehouse in Texas	Sheriff Ed Earl Dodd
1978	Richard Kiley	Man of La Mancha	Don Quixote / Cervantes
1979
1979	**Len Cariou**	**Sweeney Todd**	**Sweeney Todd**
1979	Joel Grey	The Grand Tour	S. L. Jacobowsky
1979	Charles Repole	Whoopee!	Henry Williams
1979	Peter Walker	My Old Friends	Peter Schermann

=== 1980s ===
Year	Actor	Musical	Character
1980
1980	**Jim Dale**	**Barnum**	**P. T. Barnum**
1980	Christopher Durang	Das Lusitania Spongspiel	Performer
1980	Mandy Patinkin	Evita	Che
1980	Mickey Rooney	Sugar Babies	Mickey
1980	Giorgio Tozzi	The Most Happy Fella	Tony
1980	Jerry Zaks	Tintypes	Performer
1981
1981	**Kevin Kline**	**The Pirates of Penzance**	**The Pirate King**
1981	George Rose	The Pirates of Penzance	Major-General
1981	Martin Vidnovic	Brigadoon	Tommy Albright
1982–83
1982–83	—N/a	—N/a	—N/a
1984
1984	**George Hearn**	**La Cage aux Folles**	**Albin**
1984	Gene Barry	La Cage aux Folles	Georges
1984	Mandy Patinkin	Sunday in the Park with George	George
1985
1985	**Ron Richardson**	**Big River**	**Jim**
1985	David Carroll	La bohème	Rodolfo
1985	Harry Groener	Harrigan 'N Hart	Edward Harrigan
1985	Mark Hamill	Harrigan 'N Hart	Tony Hart
1985	Daniel H. Jenkins	Big River	Huckleberry Finn
1985	Gary Morris	La bohème	Rodolfo
1986
1986	**George Rose**	**The Mystery of Edwin Drood**	**Mayor Thomas Sapsea / William Cartwright**
1986	Cleavant Derricks	Big Deal	Charley
1986	Howard McGillin	The Mystery of Edwin Drood	John Jasper / Mr. Clive Paget
1987
1987	**Robert Lindsay**	**Me and My Girl**	**Bill Snibson**
1987	Ed Dixon	Shylock	Shylock
1987	Mandy Patinkin	The Knife	Peter
1987	Colm Wilkinson	Les Misérables	Jean Valjean
1988
1988	**Michael Crawford**	**The Phantom of the Opera**	**The Phantom of the Opera**
1988	David Carroll	Chess	Anatoly
1988	Howard McGillin	Anything Goes	Billy Crocker
1988	George Merritt	Lost in the Stars	Stephen Kumalo
1989
1989	**Jason Alexander**	**Jerome Robbins' Broadway**	**Various Characters**
1989	Bob Gunton	Sweeney Todd	Sweeney Todd
1989	Richard Muenz	The Pajama Game	Sid Sorokin
1989	Scott Wise	Jerome Robbins' Broadway	Various Characters

=== 1990s ===
Year	Actor	Musical	Character
1990
1990	**James Naughton**	**City of Angels**	**Stone**
1990	Mike Burstyn	The Rothschilds	Mayer
1990	David Carroll	Grand Hotel	Felix Von Gaigern
1991
1991	**Jonathan Pryce**	**Miss Saigon**	**The Engineer**
1991	Keith Carradine	The Will Rogers Follies	Will Rogers
1991	Paul Hipp	Buddy – The Buddy Holly Story	Buddy Holly
1991	Mandy Patinkin	The Secret Garden	Archibald Craven
1992
1992	**Gregory Hines**	**Jelly's Last Jam**	**Jelly Roll Morton**
1992	**Nathan Lane**	**Guys and Dolls**	**Nathan Detroit**
1992	Peter Gallagher	Guys and Dolls	Sky
1992	Spiro Malas	The Most Happy Fella	Tony
1993
1993	**Brent Carver**	**Kiss of the Spider Woman**	**Luis Molina**
1993	Jason Graae	Hello Muddah, Hello Faddah!	Barry Brockman
1993	Con O'Neill	Blood Brothers	Mickey
1993	Martin Short	The Goodbye Girl	Elliot Garfield
1994
1994	**Boyd Gaines**	**She Loves Me**	**Georg Nowack**
1994	Michael Hayden	Carousel	Billy Bigelow
1994	Terrence Mann	Beauty and the Beast	The Beast
1994	Jere Shea	Passion	Giorgio
1995
1995	**Vernel Bagneris**	**Jelly Roll**	**Jelly Roll Morton**
1995	Matthew Broderick	How to Succeed in Business Without Really Trying	J. Pierrepont Finch
1995	Malcolm Gets	Merrily We Roll Along	Franklin Shepard
1995	George Hearn	Sunset Boulevard	Max
1995	J. K. Simmons	Das Barbecü	Various Characters
1996
1996	**Nathan Lane**	**A Funny Thing Happened on the Way to the Forum**	**Pseudolus**
1996	David Garrison	I Do! I Do!	Michael
1996	Savion Glover	Bring in 'da Noise, Bring in 'da Funk	'da Beat / Lil' Dahlin'
1996	Daniel H. Jenkins	Big: the musical	Josh Baskin
1996	Adam Pascal	Rent	Roger Davis
1996	Lou Diamond Phillips	The King and I	The King of Siam
1997
1997	**Robert Cuccioli**	**Jekyll & Hyde**	**Dr. Henry Jekyll / Edward Hyde**
1997	Jim Dale	Candide	Dr. Pangloss
1997	Jason Danieley	Candide	Candide
1997	Daniel McDonald	Steel Pier	Bill Kelly
1997	James Naughton	Chicago	Billy Flynn
1998
1998	**Alan Cumming**	**Cabaret**	**The Master of Ceremonies**
1998	Peter Friedman	Ragtime	Tateh
1998	John Cameron Mitchell	Hedwig and the Angry Inch	Hedwig
1998	Douglas Sills	The Scarlet Pimpernel	Percy Blakeney
1998	Brent Spiner	1776	Adams
1998	Brian Stokes Mitchell	Ragtime	Coalhouse Walker, Jr.
1999
1999	**Brent Carver**	**Parade**	**Leo Frank**
1999	Martin Short	Little Me	Various Characters
1999	Patrick Wilson	Bright Lights, Big City	Jamie
1999	Tom Wopat	Annie Get Your Gun	Frank Butler

=== 2000s ===
Year	Actor	Musical	Character
2000
2000	**Brian Stokes Mitchell**	**Kiss Me, Kate**	**Fred Graham / Petruchio**
2000	Craig Bierko	The Music Man	Harold Hill
2000	Brian d'Arcy James	The Wild Party	Burrs
2000	Boyd Gaines	Contact	Michael Wiley
2000	Mandy Patinkin	The Wild Party	Burrs
2001
2001	**Nathan Lane**	**The Producers**	**Max Bialystock**
2001	Matthew Broderick	The Producers	Leo Bloom
2001	Kevin Chamberlin	Seussical	Horton the Elephant
2001	Tom Hewitt	The Rocky Horror Show	Dr. Frank N. Furter
2001	Deven May	Bat Boy: The Musical	Bat Boy
2001	Patrick Wilson	The Full Monty	Jerry Lukowski
2002
2002	**John Lithgow**	**Sweet Smell of Success**	**J.J. Hunsecker**
2002	Norbert Leo Butz	The Last Five Years	Jamie
2002	Brian d'Arcy James	Sweet Smell of Success	Sidney
2002	Raúl Esparza	Tick, Tick... Boom!	Jon
2002	Peter Gallagher	Guys and Dolls	Sky
2002	Patrick Wilson	Oklahoma!	Curly
2003
2003	**Antonio Banderas**	**Nine**	**Guido Contini**
2003	**Harvey Fierstein**	**Hairspray**	**Edna Turnblad**
2003	Malcolm Gets	Amour	Dusoleil
2003	Jason Petty	Hank Williams: Lost Highway	Hank Williams
2003	John Selya	Movin' Out	Eddie
2003	Brian Stokes Mitchell	Man of La Mancha	Don Quixote / Cervantes
2004
2004	**Hugh Jackman**	**The Boy from Oz**	**Peter Allen**
2004	Hunter Foster	Little Shop of Horrors	Seymour
2004	Tyrone Giordano	Big River	Huckleberry Finn
2004	Michael McElroy	Big River	Jim
2004	Alfred Molina	Fiddler on the Roof	Tevye
2004	Euan Morton	Taboo	George
2005
2005	**Norbert Leo Butz**	**Dirty Rotten Scoundrels**	**Freddy Benson**
2005	Hank Azaria	Monty Python's Spamalot	Various Characters
2005	Mike Burstyn	On Second Avenue	Performer
2005	Matthew Morrison	The Light in the Piazza	Fabrizio Naccarelli
2005	David Hyde Pierce	Monty Python's Spamalot	Sir Robin
2005	Bill Thompson	God Hates the Irish	Johnny Kavanaugh
2006
2006	**John Lloyd Young**	**Jersey Boys**	**Frankie Valli**
2006	Michael Cerveris	Sweeney Todd	Sweeney Todd
2006	Harry Connick Jr.	The Pajama Game	Sid Sorokin
2006	Marc Kudisch	See What I Wanna See	Morito / Husband / CPA
2006	Stephen Lynch	The Wedding Singer	Robbie Hart
2006	Bob Martin	The Drowsy Chaperone	Man in Chair
2007
2007	**Raúl Esparza**	**Company**	**Robert**
2007	Michael Cerveris	LoveMusik	Kurt Weill
2007	John Gallagher Jr.	Spring Awakening	Moritz
2007	Jonathan Groff	Spring Awakening	Melchior
2007	David Hyde Pierce	Curtains	Lieutenant Frank Cioffi
2007	Martin Short	Martin Short: Fame Becomes Me	Himself
2008
2008	**Paulo Szot**	**South Pacific**	**Emile de Becque**
2008	Daniel Breaker	Passing Strange	Youth
2008	André De Shields	Black Nativity	Preacher / Narrator
2008	Daniel Evans	Sunday in the Park with George	George
2008	Cheyenne Jackson	Xanadu	Sonny Malone
2008	Matthew Morrison	10 Million Miles	Duane
2009
2009	**Brian d'Arcy James**	**Shrek the Musical**	**Shrek**
2009	James Barbour	A Tale of Two Cities	Sydney Carton
2009	Daniel Breaker	Shrek the Musical	Donkey
2009	Josh Grisetti	Enter Laughing	David Kolowitz
2009	Sahr Ngaujah	Fela!	Fela Kuti
2009	Will Swenson	Hair	Berger

=== 2010s ===
Year	Actor	Musical	Character
2010
2010	**Douglas Hodge**	**La Cage aux Folles**	**Albin**
2010	Brandon Victor Dixon	The Scottsboro Boys	Haywood Patterson
2010	Cheyenne Jackson	Finian's Rainbow	Woody
2010	Chad Kimball	Memphis	Huey Calhoun
2010	Nathan Lane	The Addams Family	Gomez
2010	Bobby Steggert	Yank!	Stu
2011
2011	**Norbert Leo Butz**	**Catch Me If You Can**	**Carl Hanratty**
2011	Colin Donnell	Anything Goes	Billy Crocker
2011	Daniel Radcliffe	How to Succeed in Business Without Really Trying	J. Pierrepont Finch
2011	Andrew Rannells	The Book of Mormon	Elder Price
2011	Tony Sheldon	Priscilla, Queen of the Desert	Bernadette
2011	Christopher Sieber	The Kid	Dan
2012
2012	**Danny Burstein**	**Follies**	**Buddy Plummer**
2012	Kevin Earley	Death Takes a Holiday	Death / Sirki
2012	Raúl Esparza	Leap of Faith	Jonas Nightengale
2012	Jeremy Jordan	Newsies	Jack Kelly
2012	Norm Lewis	Porgy and Bess	Porgy
2012	Ricky Martin	Evita	Che
2013
2013	**Billy Porter**	**Kinky Boots**	**Lola**
2013	Eric Anderson	Soul Doctor	Shlomo Carlebach
2013	Brian d'Arcy James	Giant	Bick
2013	Jim Norton	The Mystery of Edwin Drood	Mayor Thomas Sapsea / William Cartwright
2013	Steve Rosen	The Other Josh Cohen	Josh Cohen
2013	Ryan Silverman	Passion	Giorgio
2013	Anthony Warlow	Annie	Oliver Warbucks
2014
2014	**Neil Patrick Harris**	**Hedwig and the Angry Inch**	**Hedwig**
2014	**Jefferson Mays**	**A Gentleman's Guide to Love and Murder**	**The D'Ysquith Family**
2014	Adam Jacobs	Aladdin	Aladdin
2014	Andy Karl	Rocky the Musical	Rocky Balboa
2014	Steven Pasquale	The Bridges of Madison County	Robert Kincaid
2014	Bryce Pinkham	A Gentleman's Guide to Love and Murder	Monty Navarro
2015
2015	**Robert Fairchild**	**An American in Paris**	**Jerry Mulligan**
2015	Brian d'Arcy James	Something Rotten!	Nick Bottom
2015	Jeremy Kushnier	Atomic	Leo Szilard
2015	Lin-Manuel Miranda	Hamilton	Alexander Hamilton
2015	Matthew Morrison	Finding Neverland	J. M. Barrie
2015	Ryan Silverman	Side Show	Terry Connor
2016
2016	**Danny Burstein**	**Fiddler on the Roof**	**Tevye**
2016	Robert Creighton	Cagney	James Cagney
2016	Michael C. Hall	Lazarus	Thomas Newton
2016	Zachary Levi	She Loves Me	Georg Nowack
2016	Benjamin Walker	American Psycho	Patrick Bateman
2017
2017	**Andy Karl**	**Groundhog Day**	**Phil Connors**
2017	Nick Blaemire	Tick, Tick... Boom!	Jonathan
2017	Jon Jon Briones	Miss Saigon	The Engineer
2017	Nick Cordero	A Bronx Tale	Sonny
2017	Jeremy Secomb	Sweeney Todd	Sweeney Todd
2018
2018	**Ethan Slater**	**SpongeBob SquarePants**	**SpongeBob SquarePants**
2018	Jelani Alladin	Frozen	Kristoff Bjorgman
2018	Harry Hadden-Paton	My Fair Lady	Henry Higgins
2018	Joshua Henry	Carousel	Billy Bigelow
2018	Evan Ruggiero	Bastard Jones	Performer
2019
2019	**Santino Fontana**	**Tootsie**	**Michael Dorsey/Dorothy Michaels**
2019	Brooks Ashmanskas	The Prom	Barry Glickman
2019	Andrew R. Butler	Rags Parkland Sings the Songs of the Future	Rags Parkland
2019	Damon Daunno	Rodgers & Hammerstein's Oklahoma!	Curly McLain
2019	Steven Skybell	Fidler Afn Dakh	Tevye

=== 2020s ===
Year	Actor	Musical	Character
2020
2020	**Larry Owens**	**A Strange Loop**	**Usher**
2020	David Aron Damane	The Unsinkable Molly Brown	JJ
2020	Chris Dwan	Enter Laughing	David Kolowitz
2020	Joshua Henry	The Wrong Man	Duran
2020	Francis Jue	Soft Power	DHH
2021	No awards: New York theatres shuttered, March 2020 to September 2021, due to the COVID-19 pandemic in New York City		
2022
2022	**Jaquel Spivey**	**A Strange Loop**	**Usher**
2022	Billy Crystal	Mr. Saturday Night	Buddy Young, Jr.
2022	Myles Frost	MJ	MJ
2022	Rob McClure	Mrs. Doubtfire	Daniel Hillard
2022	Chip Zien	Harmony: A New Musical	Elder Rabbi

== Multiple wins and nominations ==
3 wins

- Nathan Lane

2 wins

- Danny Burstein
- Norbert Leo Butz
- Brent Carver

5 nominations

- Brian d'Arcy James
- Mandy Patinkin

4 nominations

- Nathan Lane

3 nominations

- Brian Stokes Mitchell
- Matthew Morrison
- Norbert Leo Butz
- Patrick Wilson
- Raúl Esparza

2 nominations

- Raúl Juliá
- Joel Grey
- Jim Dale
- James Naughton
- George Hearn
- Peter Gallagher
- Malcolm Gets
- Boyd Gaines
- Matthew Broderick
- David Hyde Pierce
- Cheyenne Jackson
- Danny Burstein
- Brent Carver
- Joshua Henry
- Andy Karl

== See also ==
- Laurence Olivier Award for Best Actor in a Musical
- Tony Award for Best Actor in a Musical
