= Richard Riddell =

American lighting designer

Richard V. Riddell
- Education: Stanford University
- Known for: Lighting design
- Awards: Tony Award for Best Lighting Design; Drama Desk Award for Outstanding Lighting Design

Richard V. Riddell is an American lighting designer. He has had extensive teaching experience, working at the University of California, San Diego, Harvard University, and Duke University, and also has worked on numerous shows.

== Early life and education ==
Richard V. Riddell graduated from Knox College with a B.A. with honors in 1972. In 1978, he received his doctorate from Stanford University.

== Career ==
=== Teaching ===
Riddell taught in the theater department at the University of California, San Diego from 1978 to 1987. He then became the director of the Institute for Advanced Theatre Training at Harvard University until 1991. He moved to work at Duke in 1992 as the Mary D.B.T. and James H. Semans Professor of the Practice of Theater Studies, teaching classes such as "Arts and Contemporary Society", "Lighting Design for the Theater", and "Arts and Stage in the 20th Century". He also became the chairman of Duke's Department of Theater Studies. In 2007, it was announced that he would succeed Allison Haltom as Duke's vice president and secretary, as well as retain his position as assistant to the president.

=== Shows ===
Riddell has worked on numerous shows, including two Broadway shows: A Walk in the Woods and Big River. He mostly designed lighting for the shows, but occasionally dabbled in scenic design.

He designed lights for such shows as The Philadelphia Story for Missouri Repertory Theatre; Eleanor: An American Love Story for Ford's Theater; Kudzu for Ford's Theater; Otello for the English National Opera; Private Lives for Cleveland Play House; Queen of Spades for the English National Opera; Steel for American Repertory Theater; The Return of Ulysses for English National Opera; The Flying Dutchman for the Santa Fe Opera; A Walk in the Woods for the La Jolla Playhouse and for Broadway; The Day Room for American Repertory Theater; Akhnaten for the Houston Grand Opera, New York City Opera, and English National Opera; Big River for La Jolla Playhouse and Broadway; Pieces of Eight for The Acting Company National Tour; The Tempest for the London and Stratford-Upon-Avon Royal Shakespeare Companies; The Yellow Sound for Marymount Manhattan Theatre and Alte Oper; Káťa Kabanová for Houston Grand Opera; Our Town for Guthrie Theater; and Satyagraha for De Nederlandse Opera, Brooklyn Academy of Music, Lyric Opera of Chicago, Seattle Opera, and San Francisco Opera. He also worked on the scene design for 'Krapp's Last Tape for Akademie der Künste, Akhnaten, and The Yellow Sound.

== Awards ==
Riddell won the Tony Award for Best Lighting Design, Drama Desk Award for Outstanding Lighting Design, and Hewes Design Award for his work on Big River in 1985.

In 1986 he received a Knox College Alumni Achievement Award.

== Publications ==
Riddell has published many articles in different magazines and newspapers, such as American Theater, The New York Times, TheaterWeek, The Drama Review, The Chronicle of Higher Education, Contemporary Designers, and Theater Crafts.
