= The Mystery of Edwin Drood (musical) =

1985 musical

- Original Broadway poster
- Music: Rupert Holmes
- Lyrics: Rupert Holmes
- Book: Rupert Holmes
- Basis: The Mystery of Edwin Drood by Charles Dickens
- Productions: 1985 Broadway; 1987 West End; 1988 US Tour; 2007 West End revival 2012 West End revival 2012 Broadway revival
- Awards: Tony Award for Best Musical; Tony Award for Best Book of a Musical; Tony Award for Best Original Score

The Mystery of Edwin Drood is a mystery musical comedy written by Rupert Holmes based on the unfinished Charles Dickens novel of the same name. The show was the first Broadway musical with multiple endings (determined by audience vote). The show won five Tony Awards, including Best Musical, with Holmes awarded for Best Book of a Musical and Best Original Score.

The musical debuted at the New York Shakespeare Festival in August 1985 before transferring to Broadway, where it ran until May 1987, sometimes billed as Drood: The Music Hall Musical, followed by two national tours and a West End production. The Roundabout Theatre Company revived the musical in 2012.

== History ==
=== Sources ===
The musical is a staging of Charles Dickens' final and unfinished novel The Mystery of Edwin Drood in a style hearkening to British pantomime and music hall genres that had reached a height of popularity around the time of Dickens' death.

As with most of his other novels, Dickens wrote The Mystery of Edwin Drood in episodic installments. It began publication in 1870, but Dickens died suddenly that year from a stroke. He left no notes about how he intended to finish the story. Almost immediately, various authors and playwrights, including Dickens's son, wrote endings. Since then, there have been several "collaborations" between the late Dickens and other novelists, numerous theatrical extrapolations, and three film adaptations of the story.

At the time Dickens died, British pantomime styles, distinguished by the importance of audience participation and conventions like the principal boy, reached their height of popularity, and music hall performances with raucous, risqué comedy and a distinct musical style rose to prominence.

Rupert Holmes, the major creative contributor to the musical Drood, spent his early childhood in England. At age three, he was taken to the theater for the first time: a modern "panto" with a cross-dressing lead boy and audience sing-alongs. By age eleven, he was fascinated by mystery books and first discovered the unfinished Dickens novel. Holmes drew on these experiences when impresario Joseph Papp, the creator and head of the New York Shakespeare Festival, approached him to write a new musical.

=== Concept ===
Holmes, a singer-songwriter who recorded the Billboard No. 1 Hit, "Escape (The Piña Colada Song)" and wrote songs for the Platters, the Drifters, Wayne Newton, Dolly Parton, Barry Manilow, and Barbra Streisand, first became interested in writing a musical in 1983. After a nightclub appearance where he performed "story songs" and shared humorous anecdotes, Holmes received a note from Gail Merrifield, director of play development at the New York Shakespeare Festival and Joseph Papp's wife. She had seen Holmes' performance and suggested he write a full-length musical.

Holmes conceived the show’s central premises by drawing on his recollections of Dickens' novel and pantomime as a youth, and his later experiences with Victorian-style music hall performances. From Dickens work, Holmes took the central plot and most of the featured characters. From pantomime, he retained the concept of the "Lead Boy,” always portrayed by a young female in male drag, which permitted him to write a love song sung by two sopranos. Pantomime also inspired the most ground-breaking aspect of Drood: audience participation. From music hall traditions, he created the lead character of "The Chairman,” a sort of Master of Ceremonies instigating stage action.

Holmes wrote the book, the music, the lyrics, and the full orchestrations for Drood, an unusual accomplishment. While Holmes believed no Broadway creator had done this before, and the feat was frequently mentioned in reviews and press about the show, it was more common in the early days of musical theatre. Although songwriters, including Adolf Philipp, had been credited for the books of their musicals, none had also written their orchestrations.

In writing the book, Holmes deliberately chose not to imitate Dickens's writing style, as he felt it would be too bleak for the show he envisioned. Instead, he employed the device of a "show-within-a-show." The cast members of Drood do not specifically play Dickens's characters; rather, they are music hall players performing as Dickens's characters. This device allowed for the incorporation of light comedy, which was not present in the original novel, and several musical numbers unrelated to the original story. Holmes explained his decision, stating, "This is not Nicholas Nickleby set to music – it's not a Dickensian work. It's light fun and entertaining. But I hope – I think – that Dickens would have enjoyed it." Holmes also noted that the show “has the same relationship to Dickens that Kiss Me, Kate does to The Taming of the Shrew."

Most inventively, Holmes used a novel method to determine the play’s outcome: audience voting. At a break in the show, the audience votes on who killed Drood, the identity of the mysterious Dick Datchery, and which two characters will become romantically involved, creating a happy ending. Since every audience differs in temperament, the outcome is theoretically unpredictable, even to the actors, who must quickly tally the votes and perform the chosen ending (although some smaller companies will "fix" the results to limit the number of possible endings). This device required Holmes to write numerous short endings to cover every possible voting outcome.

== Deviations from the novel ==
There are several differences between the musical and the Dickens novel. The most obvious is tone. The original episodes, consistent with Dickens’s style, were bleak. Holmes made the show more lighthearted and comedic. There are also differences in characters. The most notable is Jasper, who Dickens portrayed as undoubtedly repressed and troubled. Holmes made him a full-fledged split personality, omitting several of the novel's clues that Jasper is the killer, fabricating new clues implicating other suspects, and explaining that there would be no mystery if Jasper were the obvious killer. Holmes also omitted several minor characters and expanded the roles of others. For example, Bazzard is employed by Rosa's guardian, Mr. Grewgious, in the novel, but he is Crisparkle's assistant in the musical.

== Synopsis ==
The following synopsis represents one particular version of the plot, though licensed variants of the show allow for fewer or more songs and lines, songs in a different order, and fewer or more plot points.

=== Act I ===
Actors of London's Music Hall Royale circulate among, and then introduce themselves to, the audience, led by their Chairman, who acts as narrator ("There You Are"). He introduces the play's setting as the (fictional) town of Cloisterham and its cathedral's choirmaster, John Jasper, whose mundane life is splitting his mind in two ("A Man Could Go Quite Mad"). Jasper greets his adoring young nephew Edwin Drood ("Two Kinsmen"), who is engaged to Rosa Bud, Jasper's music pupil and the secret object of Jasper's lustful obsession. At Rosa's next music lesson, Jasper makes her sing a song he has composed with obvious sexual innuendo ("Moonfall"). The cathedral's kindly Reverend Crisparkle arrives to announce that immigrant twins from Ceylon, Helena and Neville Landless, will be living under his care. Neville is immediately attracted to Rosa, which makes him a rival to both Drood and the sinister Jasper.

The Chairman brings the audience to the London opium den of the ageing Princess Puffer, who laments her morally corrupt livelihood ("Wages of Sin"). One of Puffer's regular clients is none other than Jasper, who cries out the name 'Rosa Bud' during a hallucination, which Puffer overhears. Back in Cloisterham, Neville and Drood meet, each quickly offending the other.

Next, the Chairman is forced to play the town's mayor as the regular actor is too drunk to appear. The Chairman and Jasper sing of their confusing double roles (Jasper, though, referring to his split personality) in a patter song ("Both Sides of the Coin"). Edwin and Rosa, who have been promised to each other since they were children, decide to call off their engagement. As a parting gift, Rosa gives Drood her hair clasp ("Perfect Strangers").

On Christmas Eve, Jasper arranges a dinner for the Landless twins, Crisparkle, Rosa, and Drood. However, Neville and Drood's antagonism only worsens, and Crisparkle reveals he once loved Rosa's now-deceased mother ("No Good Can Come from Bad"). The guests frantically depart into a violent storm. There is a short halt, where the actor playing Bazzard, an employee of the cathedral, soliloquizes about how he never lands a major part in a show ("Never The Luck").

The next day Drood has vanished. Bazzard discovers Edwin's torn coat by the river. Drood was last seen walking there with Neville the night before. Neville is almost lynched by the townsfolk, but Crisparkle and Helena persuade the mayor to release him, since no corpse has yet been discovered. Jasper confesses his deranged love to Rosa. She is horrified, and he pursues her offstage ("The Name Of Love/Moonfall").

=== Act II ===
Six months later, there is still no sign of Drood. Puffer has been investigating Drood's disappearance but has also noticed a seedy-looking figure doing the same: detective "Dick Datchery", played by the same actor who plays Drood ("Settling Up The Score"). The cast summarizes the situation so far, and the Chairman announces that the audience will now take a series of votes to determine the story's end ("Don't Quit While You're Ahead"). He says that Datchery is an alias for one of the other characters in disguise. When he concludes that Drood is indeed murdered and therefore not Datchery, the actress playing Drood/Datchery storms out of the theatre. Actors then tally votes from the audience for the identity of both Datchery and Drood's murderer.

Puffer tells Rosa that she was once her nanny before her reluctant descent into a life of crime ("Garden Path To Hell"). Puffer also reveals the identity of Datchery ("Puffer's Revelation"). The evening's Datchery (either Bazzard, Reverend Crisparkle, Helena, Neville, or Rosa) then explains why they took up a disguise and tracked down the killer; the girls did it mainly to disguise their gender, Neville to prove his innocence, Crisparkle to help both Neville and Helena, and Bazzard to give himself a bigger dramatic role ("Out On A Limerick"). The commonalities of each version are that the character follows Jasper to his house and finds the clasp that Rosa gave Drood, which Jasper could only have taken from Drood. The townspeople then haul Jasper onstage, where he admits that he strangled his nephew under the influence of opium ("Jasper's Confession").

The town's gravedigger, Durdles, however, steps forward with a twist. Depending on the audience's vote, Durdles reveals that Bazzard, Crisparkle, Helena, Neville, Puffer, Rosa, or Durdles himself is the real murderer. The murderer confesses ("Murderer's Confession"). The gist of each confession is that the murderer was seeking to kill Jasper for his or her purpose: Puffer to protect Rosa, Rosa to save herself, Helena to avenge Jasper for ruining her twin's reputation, Bazzard for the limelight, Neville because he wanted Rosa for himself, or Crisparkle because he wanted to protect Rosa and Neville from Jasper's evil (or in other versions because he is losing his mind). The murders tend to hinge on the fact that the killer mistook Drood for Jasper since Drood was wearing Jasper's coat, which Drood borrowed during the storm. (Durdles's confession, however, is merely that he drunkenly killed Drood when mistaking him for a ghost.)

Still, the Chairman demands a happy ending and asks the audience to select two lovers from among the remaining cast. The chosen members declare their love ("Perfect Strangers - Reprise"). Just then, Edwin Drood emerges from Cloisterham's crypt, explaining that when he was attacked, he was only stunned not killed. Jasper dragged him to the crypt but, when Drood woke, he fled from Cloisterham for six months, only returning when his attacker's identity was finally revealed ("The Writing On The Wall").

=== Murderers ===
- John Jasper – Edwin Drood's uncle, John Jasper is madly in love with Drood's fiancée Rosa Bud, so his violent split personality gladly killed Drood. His confession reprises both "A Man Could Go Quite Mad" and "Moonfall". Jasper's confession is performed no matter who is chosen as the murderer, and the audience is discouraged from voting for him since he is the obvious solution.
- Rosa Bud – Edwin Drood's long-time fiancée, Rosa Bud meant to kill Jasper in revenge for his lustful advances as her possessive and maddening singing tutor, but she killed Drood by accident as Drood was wearing Jasper's coat. Her confession is a reprise of "A Man Could Go Quite Mad" and "No Good Can Come From Bad".
- Neville Landless – Neville is a visitor from Ceylon who murdered Drood to regain his pride after perceived humiliation and also to have a chance with Rosa Bud. His confession is a reprise of "A Man Could Go Quite Mad" and "No Good Can Come From Bad" in the original Broadway production, later changed to "A British Subject".
- Helena Landless – Neville's sister, Helena murdered Drood so her hot-blooded brother would not be tempted to seek revenge. Her confession is a reprise of "A Man Could Go Quite Mad" and "No Good Can Come From Bad" in the original Broadway production, later changed to "A British Subject".
- Princess Puffer – The proprietress of the opium den Jasper attends, the Princess Puffer killed Jasper to protect Rosa from his advances, but accidentally killed Drood because he was wearing Jasper's coat and because she was confused after having smoked opium. Her confession is a reprise of "The Wages of Sin".
- Reverend Crisparkle – The Reverend Mr Crisparkle is the local vicar madly in love with Rosa's mother, and he sees Rosa as a reincarnation of her. He murdered Drood so that he could marry Rosa. This version of Crisparkle's confession was introduced in the first national tour and has been used in all productions since. His confession is a reprise of "A Man Could Go Quite Mad" and "No Good Can Come From Bad" in the original Broadway production, later changed to "A British Subject".
- Bazzard – Bazzard is Crisparkle's assistant who, to boost his role in the show, murders Drood. This is the most metatheatrical of the endings, implying that Bazzard's actor is an actual murderer. His confession is a reprise of "A Man Could Go Quite Mad" and "Never the Luck".
- Durdles – The town drunk and stonemason, Durdles believed the still-alive Drood to be a ghost and so smashed his head in, after laying his unconscious body (injured by Jasper) down into the crypt. (Even Durdles admits the silliness of this motive within his solo, but laments that because he has been chosen, he must have one.) This solo was not used in the original Broadway production and was added for the first national tour. His confession is a reprise of "Off to the Races".

If, although not likely, the audience chooses Jasper as the murderer, Durdles does not interrupt and a second confession is not performed. (Some theaters will not count Jasper's votes, to make sure that there is a twist).

== Notable casts ==
As Drood is metatheatrical, the characters of the play The Mystery of Edwin Drood are performed by actors of the fictional "Music Hall Royale" within the production: a play-within-a-play. The following are the dual (or more) roles each cast member plays. The actress portraying Miss Alice Nutting/Edwin Drood also performs the role of Dick Datchery up until the voting portion of the evening. However, this is merely a "bit" within the context of The Music Hall Royale – Miss Nutting only portrays Datchery, the Chairman explains, due to a contractual obligation for her to appear in both acts of the play. Ultimately, the audience decides the true identity of Dick Datchery is within the confines of Dickens' story.

Drood character (Music Hall character in parentheses)	Original Broadway Cast 1985	Notable Replacements 1985–87	Original West End Cast 1987	First National Tour 1988	Broadway Revival 2012	West End Revival 2012
Mayor Thomas Sapsea (Chairman William Cartwright)	George Rose	David Cromwell (1987)	Ernie Wise	George Rose; Clive Revill	Jim Norton	Denis Delahunt
Edwin Drood & Dick Datchery (Alice Nutting)	Betty Buckley	Donna Murphy Paige O'Hara	Julia Hills	Paige O'Hara	Stephanie J. Block	Natalie Day
Rosa Bud (Deirdre Peregrine)	Patti Cohenour	Karen Culliver	Patti Cohenour	Teresa De Zarn	Betsy Wolfe	Victoria Farley
John Jasper (Clive Paget)	Howard McGillin		David Burt	Mark Jacoby	Will Chase	Daniel Robinson
Princess Puffer (Miss Angela Prysock)	Cleo Laine	Loretta Swit Karen Morrow	Lulu	Jean Stapleton	Chita Rivera	Wendi Peters
Reverend Crisparkle (Cedric Moncrieffe)	George N. Martin*		Martin Wimbush	William McClary	Gregg Edelman	Richard Stirling
Neville Landless (Victor Grinstead)	John Herrera		Mark Ryan	John DeLuca	Andy Karl	David Francis
Helena Landless (Janet Conover)	Jana Schneider	Alison Fraser	Marilyn Cutts	Jana Schneider	Jessie Mueller	Loula Geater
Bazzard & Waiter (Philip Bax)	Joe Grifasi	David Cromwell	Paul Bentley	Ronn Carroll	Peter Benson	Mark Ralston
Durdles (Nick Cricker)	Jerome Dempsey	Tony Azito	Phil Rose	Tony Azito	Robert Creighton	Paul Hutton
Deputy (Nick Cricker, Jr.)	Stephen Glavin	Brad Miskell	Anthony Lennon	Michael Nostrand	Nicholas Barasch	Tom Pepper

- The role of Crisparkle was originally portrayed both in the readings and Delacorte production by the actor/playwright Larry Shue. When Shue died in a plane crash between the show's run at the Delacorte and its opening on Broadway, Rupert Holmes renamed the Music Hall Royale performer who portrayed Crisparkle from Wilfred Barking-Smythe to Cedric Moncrieffe, out of respect for Shue.

== Musical numbers ==
Act I

- "There You Are" – Chairman with Angela, Deirdre, Alice, Victor, Clive and Company's
- "A Man Could Go Quite Mad" – Jasper
- "Two Kinsmen" – Jasper and Drood
- "Moonfall" – Rosa
- "Moonfall Quartet" – Rosa, Helena, Wendy and Beatrice
- "The Wages of Sin" – Puffer
- "Jasper's Vision" – Dream Ballet*
- "Ceylon" – Neville, Helena and Company
- "A British Subject" – Neville, Helena, Drood, Rosa, Crisparkle and Company†
- "Both Sides of the Coin" – Sapsea and Jasper
- "Perfect Strangers" – Rosa and Drood
- "No Good Can Come from Bad" – Neville, Jasper, Rosa, Drood, Helena, Crisparkle and Waiter
- "Never the Luck" – Bax / Bazzard and Company
- "The Name of Love" / "Moonfall" – Jasper, Rosa and Company††

Act II

- "An English Music Hall" – Chairman and Company†
- "Settling Up the Score" – Puffer, Datchery and Company
- "Off to the Races" – Sapsea, Durdles, Deputy and Company§
- "Don't Quit While You're Ahead" – Puffer, Datchery and Company
- "Don't Quit While You're Ahead" (Reprise) – Company*
- "Settling Up the Score" (Reprise) – Chairman, Suspects and Company*
- "The Garden Path to Hell" – Puffer
- "Puffer's Revelation" – Puffer*
- "Out on a Limerick" – Datcherys^{[A]}
- "Jasper's Confession" – Jasper
- "Murderer's Confession"^{[B]}
- "Perfect Strangers" (Reprise)*^{[C]}
- "The Writing on the Wall" – Drood and Company

* Not included in the original cast recording

† Reinstated for the 2012 Broadway revival

§ Moved at the end of Act I for the Tams-Witmark licensed version and the 2012 Broadway revival

†† Moved after "Settling Up the Score" for the Tams-Witmark licensed version and the 2012 Broadway revival

For the version of Drood that Tams-Witmark licenses to theater companies, Holmes made a variety of changes to the score and libretto, many of which reflect the versions seen in the 1987 London production and the 1988 North American touring production. The numbers "A Man Could Go Quite Mad," "Ceylon," "Settling Up the Score," and the quartet reprise of "Moonfall" are not standard but are provided as "additional material" that theaters can choose to perform at their options.

- A new song, "A Private Investigation", is offered to replace "Settling Up the Score".
- "Off to the Races" swaps places with "The Name of Love/Moonfall (Reprise)" and becomes the Act One finale.
- "Ceylon" is replaced by "A British Subject", while "England Reigns" became the new Act Two opening (both numbers had been in the show during the first staged reading in 1985).
- Durdles is added as a possible murderer, and a "Murderer's confession" was composed for him, to the tune of "Off to the Races". The confessions of Neville, Helena, and Crisparkle were rewritten to be reprises of "A British Subject."

Notes

- A This song is performed by a different actor each night, depending upon the audience vote.
- B This song is performed by a different actor each night, depending on who is voted murderer. Alternatively, if Jasper is voted murderer, it is either performed by the runner-up or not performed at all.
- C This song is performed by a different pair of actors every night, depending upon the audience vote.

== Recordings ==
Original cast recording

In 1985, a recording was made of The Mystery of Edwin Drood featuring the original Broadway cast. This recording was released by Polydor with the additional subtitle, The Solve-It-Yourself Broadway Musical (Polydor 827969) and the CD included versions of "Out on a Limerick" by all five possible Datcherys (Rosa, Crisparkle, Bazzard, Neville, and Helena) and all six possible Murderer's Confessions (Puffer, Rosa, Bazzard, Crisparkle, Neville, and Helena), as well as an "instructional track" entitled "A Word From Your Chairman...." The LP and cassette included only the opening-night Confession and murderer, and omitted the "lovers." A 1990 re-issue of the cast album by Varèse Sarabande (Varèse 5597) included two tracks, "Ceylon" and "Moonfall Quartet", that are on the original LP and cassette, but not on the CD. It included only Bazzard's version of "Out on a Limerick" and two Murderer Confessions (Rosa's and Puffer's). The Polydor recording was briefly available on cassette and LP and ultimately re-released by Varèse Sarabande. Both versions of the cast album are currently out of print, but can sometimes be found (often at a high price) through secondhand vendors or online auction sites.

An Australian cast album (GEP Records 9401) was released in 1994. This recording did not include "Ceylon" or "Moonfall Quartet", but did include three previously unrecorded tracks: "A British Subject", "Puffer's Revelation", and "Durdles' Confession". The Australian cast album was performed by a largely non-professional cast and used (arguably crude) midi sequencing in lieu of a live orchestra. Two songs that were omitted from Drood before it reached Broadway, "An English Music Hall" and "Evensong," (a duet between Rosa and Crisparkle) were later recorded for the 1994 album, Lost In Boston. Other songs that never made it into the Broadway or London/'88 Tour (Tams-Witmark) versions include: "When the Wicked Man Comes" (sung by a much younger Deputy), "Sapsea's Song" (a music hall ditty for Mayor Sapsea), "I Wouldn't Say No" (a song and dance routine for Durdles) as well as "When Shall These Three Meet Again" – a group number which can be heard as underscoring throughout the show and in the murderer's confession: "But the night was far from bright..."

The 2012 cast recording

On January 29, 2013, a recording featuring the 2012 cast of the Broadway revival was released by DRG Records in a 2-disc set and as a digital download. DRG Records describes the recording as "the complete musical program on 2 compact discs" for the first time. Differences between this recording and the original recording include confessions from all eight possible murderers, two versions of "Out on a Limerick" (Bazzard and Helena), the lovers' reprise of "Perfect Strangers" (featuring a combination of Princess Puffer & Deputy, Helena & Neville, and Rosa & Durdles), a revised "Ceylon" (which now incorporates "A British Subject"), a previously cut song ("An English Music Hall") as the new opening for Act II, and the "Opium Den Ballet". Holmes penned the liner notes for the album that will reflect new material and revisions. Holmes also re-orchestrated the production for a 19-piece orchestra led by Paul Gemignani.

== Productions ==
After Rupert Holmes wrote an initial draft that lasted three-and-a-half hours and performed it, solo, for Joseph Papp, Gail Merrifield, and Wilford Leach, (the New York Shakespeare Festival's artistic director), Papp offered to produce the show as part of the Festival (also known as "Shakespeare in the Park") and told Holmes that it would be immediately transferred to Broadway if it was deemed a success. The original production of The Mystery of Edwin Drood premiered in New York City's Central Park at the Delacorte Theatre on August 21, 1985, after only three weeks of rehearsals. Notably, Holmes conceived most of the orchestrations himself, a rarity for a Broadway composer.

After the final Festival performance on September 1, preparations for the Broadway transfer (retaining the original cast) immediately got underway. Following a great deal of editing (the Delacorte version contained 32 original songs and was nearly three hours long) The Mystery of Edwin Drood opened on Broadway at the Imperial Theatre on December 2, 1985. The show ran for 608 performances (not including 24 previews) and closed on May 16, 1987. The Broadway production was produced by Papp and directed by Leach, with choreography by Graciela Daniele.

The opening night cast of the Broadway production starred George Rose, Cleo Laine, John Herrera, Howard McGillin, Patti Cohenour, and Jana Schneider, who were all nominated for 1986 Tony Awards for their performances, as well as Betty Buckley in the title role. Donna Murphy, Judy Kuhn, and Rob Marshall were members of the ensemble. Marshall, who would later become best known as a theater/film director-choreographer, was the Dance Captain and Graciela Daniele's assistant choreographer. Kuhn (in her Broadway debut) served as the understudy to both Buckley and Cohenour, and then left in 1986 for her featured roles in Rags and, later, Les Mis. Before the show ended its run, Murphy, who was understudy to Cleo Laine and Jana Schneider, took over the title role. Other notable replacements during the show's run included Alison Fraser (taking over for Jana Schneider), Paige O'Hara (taking over for Donna Murphy as Drood after being her understudy), as well as Loretta Swit and later Karen Morrow, who stepped into Laine's roles.

In 1988, several months after closing on Broadway, a slightly revised version of Drood, directed by Rob Marshall (with his sister Kathleen as his assistant), began its first North American tour at the Kennedy Center Opera House in Washington, DC, with Rose, Schneider, and O'Hara reprising their leads, and Jean Stapleton playing Laine's role. During a break in the tour, George Rose returned to his home in the Dominican Republic and was murdered during his stay. Rose was succeeded by Clive Revill.

The show, also enjoyed a 1987 West End run at the Savoy Theatre in London, a second U.S. national tour, a production at the Shaw Festival in Niagara-on-the-Lake, Ontario, Canada, and numerous regional and professional and amateur theatrical productions worldwide. In 2007–08, a London revival, presented as a chamber piece and directed by Ted Craig, ran at the Warehouse Theatre.

In 2012, a London West End revival of the musical played at the Arts Theatre for a limited season from 18 May. The cast was headed by Wendi Peters as Princess Puffer, with Natalie Day as Edwin Drood, Daniel Robinson as John Jasper, and Victoria Farley as Rosa Bud. The production was directed by Matthew Gould.

The Roundabout Theatre Company presented a Broadway revival at Studio 54, which opened in November 2012 and ran for 136 performances through March 10, 2013. The production was directed by Scott Ellis and starred Chita Rivera as Puffer, Stephanie J. Block as Drood, Will Chase as Jasper, Jim Norton as the Chairman, and Gregg Edelmann as Crisparkle.

== Awards and nominations ==
=== Original Broadway production ===
Year	Award	Category	Nominee	Result
1986	Tony Award	Best Musical		Won
1986	Tony Award	Best Book of a Musical	Rupert Holmes	Won
1986	Tony Award	Best Original Score	Rupert Holmes	Won
1986	Tony Award	Best Performance by a Leading Actor in a Musical	George Rose	Won
1986	Tony Award	Best Performance by a Leading Actress in a Musical	Cleo Laine	Nominated
1986	Tony Award	Best Performance by a Featured Actor in a Musical	John Herrera	Nominated
1986	Tony Award	Best Performance by a Featured Actor in a Musical	Howard McGillin	Nominated
1986	Tony Award	Best Performance by a Featured Actress in a Musical	Patti Cohenour	Nominated
1986	Tony Award	Best Performance by a Featured Actress in a Musical	Jana Schneider	Nominated
1986	Tony Award	Best Direction of a Musical	Wilford Leach	Won
1986	Tony Award	Best Choreography	Graciela Daniele	Nominated
1986	Drama Desk Award	Outstanding Musical		Won
1986	Drama Desk Award	Outstanding Book of a Musical	Rupert Holmes	Won
1986	Drama Desk Award	Outstanding Actor in a Musical	George Rose	Won
1986	Drama Desk Award	Outstanding Actor in a Musical	Howard McGillin	Nominated
1986	Drama Desk Award	Outstanding Actress in a Musical	Cleo Laine	Nominated
1986	Drama Desk Award	Outstanding Actress in a Musical	Patti Cohenour	Nominated
1986	Drama Desk Award	Outstanding Featured Actor in a Musical	Joe Grifasi	Nominated
1986	Drama Desk Award	Outstanding Featured Actress in a Musical	Jana Schneider	Won
1986	Drama Desk Award	Outstanding Director of a Musical	Wilford Leach	Won
1986	Drama Desk Award	Outstanding Lyrics	Rupert Holmes	Won
1986	Drama Desk Award	Outstanding Music	Rupert Holmes	Won
1986	Drama Desk Award	Outstanding Orchestrations	Rupert Holmes	Won
1986	Drama Desk Award	Outstanding Set Design	Bob Shaw	Nominated
1986	Drama Desk Award	Outstanding Costume Design	Lindsay Davis	Won
1986	Drama Desk Award	Outstanding Lighting Design	Paul Gallo	Nominated

=== 2012 Broadway revival ===
Year	Award	Category	Nominee	Result
2013	Drama Desk Award	Outstanding Revival of a Musical		Nominated
2013	Drama Desk Award	Outstanding Actor in a Musical	Jim Norton	Nominated
2013	Drama Desk Award	Outstanding Actress in a Musical	Stephanie J. Block	Nominated
2013	Drama Desk Award	Outstanding Featured Actor in a Musical	Andy Karl	Nominated
2013	Drama Desk Award	Outstanding Featured Actress in a Musical	Jessie Mueller	Nominated
2013	Drama Desk Award	Outstanding Set Design	Anna Louizos	Nominated
2013	Drama Desk Award	Outstanding Sound Design	Tony Meola	Won
2013	Tony Award	Best Revival of a Musical		Nominated
2013	Tony Award	Best Performance by a Leading Actress in a Musical	Stephanie J. Block	Nominated
2013	Tony Award	Best Performance by a Featured Actor in a Musical	Will Chase	Nominated
2013	Tony Award	Best Direction of a Musical	Scott Ellis	Nominated
2013	Tony Award	Best Scenic Design of a Musical	Anna Louizos	Nominated
