= Molly Newman =

American television writer and producer

Molly Newman is a television writer and producer from Evansville, Indiana, who is most known for work on shows such as The Larry Sanders Show, Frasier, Murphy Brown, Tracey Takes On..., Maximum Bob, and Brothers & Sisters.

In 1985, she was nominated for Broadway's Tony Award in the category Best Book of a Musical with collaborator Barbara Damashek for Quilters.
