= Akhnaten (opera) =

1984 opera by Philip Glass

- Opera by Philip Glass
- Poster for the cinema broadcast of the 2019 production at the Metropolitan Opera
- Librettist: Philip Glass, Shalom Goldman, Robert Israel, Richard Riddell, and Jerome Robbins
- Premiere: March 24, 1984; Staatstheater Stuttgart

Akhnaten is an opera in three acts based on the life and religious convictions of the Egyptian pharaoh Akhenaten (Amenhotep IV), written by the American composer Philip Glass in 1983. The libretto is by Philip Glass in association with Shalom Goldman, Robert Israel, Richard Riddell, and Jerome Robbins. According to the composer, this work is the culmination of a trilogy including his two other biographical operas, Einstein on the Beach (about Albert Einstein) and Satyagraha (about Mahatma Gandhi). These three people were all driven by an inner vision which altered the age in which they lived: Einstein in science, Gandhi in politics, and Akhnaten in religion.

The text, taken from original sources, is generally sung in the original languages, linked together with the commentary of a narrator in the language of the audience. Egyptian texts of the period are taken from a poem of Akhenaten himself, from the Book of the Dead, and from extracts of decrees and letters from the Amarna Period, the seventeen-year period of Akhenaten's rule. Other portions are in Akkadian and Biblical Hebrew. Akhnaten's Hymn to the Sun is sung in the language of the audience.

== Performance history ==
Akhnaten was commissioned by Württembergische Staatstheater, Stuttgart and had its world premiere on March 24, 1984, at the Stuttgart State Theatre, under the German title Echnaton. Paul Esswood sang the title role, German director Achim Freyer staged the opera in an abstract style with highly ritualistic movements. The American premiere, directed by David Freeman, was on October 12, 1984, at the Houston Grand Opera, where Glass's opera The Making of the Representative for Planet 8 also premiered. The UK premiere, based on the American production, was on June 17, 1985, by English National Opera at the London Coliseum. This production was revived at the London Coliseum in March 1987.

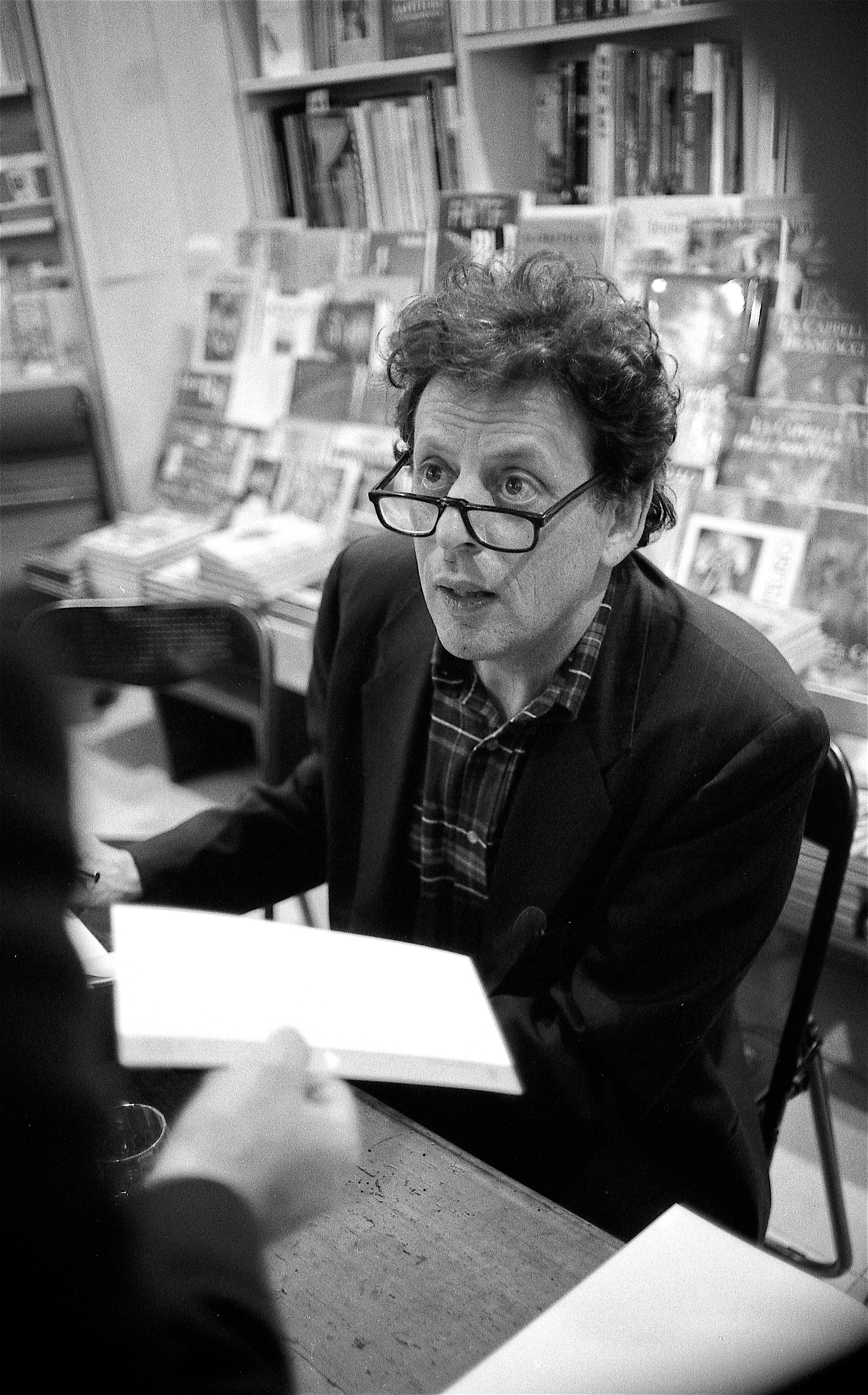
The composer in 1993

The award-winning Polish premiere, directed by Henryk Baranowski, was on May 20, 2000, at the Grand Theatre in Łódź. The French premiere was on September 23, 2002, at Opéra national du Rhin in Strasbourg as a co-production with Boston Lyric Opera which had premiered the production in February 2002 A new co-production by English National Opera and LA Opera and in collaboration with Improbable directed by Phelim McDermott starring Anthony Roth Costanzo and Zachary James premiered at the London Coliseum on March 4, 2016, which won a 2017 Olivier Award, and at LA Opera on November 5, 2016. This production saw the addition of juggling choreography by Gandini Juggling. A revival of this production in London took place in March 2019 and played at the Metropolitan Opera in their 2019/2020 season, winning the 2022 Grammy Award for Best Opera Recording. The 2019 Met production was streamed online on June 20 and November 14, 2020, and February 12, 2021, and returned in 2022. A new production directed and choreographed by Nanine Linning premiered at Theater Heidelberg on June 6, 2014, another new production directed by Laura Scozzi premiered at Oper Bonn on March 11, 2018.

A November 2020 production at Opéra de Nice Côte d’Azur was performed without an audience and screened online, due to the COVID-19 pandemic. This production was produced and choreographed by longtime Glass collaborator Lucinda Childs, who conducted rehearsals remotely. She also performed the speaking roles in the opera, which were pre-recorded and projected during the performance. The Opéra de Nice reprised their performance in October 2025 at the Philarmonie de Paris, again with Lucinda Childs as the narrator.

== Roles ==
Role	Voice type	Premiere cast, Stuttgart, 24 March 1984	ENO, London, June 1985	CBS recording, 1987	Oakland Opera Theater, 2004	ENO, London, March 2016, March 2019	LA Opera, November 2016	Theater Bonn, March 2018	Metropolitan Opera, NY, November 2019	Opéra de Nice Côte d'Azur, November 2020, October 2025	LA Opera, March 2026
Akhnaten	countertenor	Paul Esswood	Christopher Robson	(as Stuttgart)	Paul Flight	Anthony Roth Costanzo	Anthony Roth Costanzo	Benno Schachtner	Anthony Roth Costanzo	Fabrice di Falco	John Holiday
Nefertiti, Wife of Akhnaten	contralto	Milagro Vargas	Sally Burgess	(as Stuttgart)	Darla Wigginton	Emma Carrington (2016); Katie Stevenson (2019)	J'Nai Bridges	Susanne Blattert	J'Nai Bridges	Julie Robard-Gendre	Sun-Ly Pierce
Queen Tye, Mother of Akhnaten	soprano	Maria Husmann/ Melinda Liebermann	Marie Angel	Melinda Liebermann	Angela Dean-Baham	Rebecca Bottone	Stacey Tappan	Marie Heeschen	Dísella Lárusdóttir	Patrizia Ciofi	So Young Park
Horemhab, General and future Pharaoh	baritone	Wolfgang Probst/ Tero Hannula	Christopher Booth-Jones	Tero Hannula	Martin Bell	James Cleverton	Kihun Yoon	Giorgos Kanaris	Will Liverman	Frédéric Cornille	Hyungjin Son
High Priest of Amon	tenor	Helmut Holzapfel	Graeme Matheson-Bruce	(as Stuttgart)	Alan Cochran	Colin Judson	Frederick Ballentine	Johannes Mertes	Aaron Blake	Frédéric Diquero	Yuntong Han
Aye, Father of Nefertiti and advisor to the Pharaoh	bass	Konrad Arlt/ Cornelius Hauptmann	Richard Angas	Cornelius Hauptmann	John Minagro	Clive Bayley (2016); Keel Watson (2019)	Patrick Blackwell	Martin Tzonev/James Homman	Richard Bernstein	Vincent Le Texier	Vinícius Costa
Daughters of Akhnaten: Beketaten; Meretaten; Maketaten; Ankhesenpaaten; Neferneferuaten; Sotopenre	3 sopranos, 3 contraltos	Victoria Schnieder; Lynna Wilhelm-Königer; Maria Koupilova-Ticha; Christina Wächtler; Geraldine Rose; Angelika Schwarz	Janis Kelly; Ethna Robinson; Tamsin Dives; Rosemary Ashe; Eileen Hulse; Linda Kitchen	(as Stuttgart)		Clare Eggington; Alexa Mason; Rosie Lomas; Anna Huntley; Katie Bray; Victoria Gray (2016); Charlotte Shaw; Hazel McBain; Rosie Lomas; Lydia Marchione; Elizabeth Lynch; Martha Jones; Angharad Lyddon (2019)	So Young Park; Summer Hassan; Elizabeth Zharoff Michelle Siemens; Michele Hemmings; Sharmay Musacchio	Vardeni Davidian; Brigitte Jung; Martina Kellermann; Mariane Freiburg; Joelle Fleury; Ramune Sliuauskiene	Lindsay Ohse; Karen-chia-ling Ho; Chrystal E Williams; Annie Rosen; Olivia Vote; Suzanne Hendrix	Mathilde Le Petit; Rachel Duckett; Mathilde Lemaire; Vasiliki Koltouki; Laeticia Goepfert; Aviva Manenti	Emily Damasco; Julia Maria Johnson; Katie Trigg; Abi Levis; Erin Alford; Kristen Choi
Amenhotep, son of Hapu, scribe	spoken role	David Warrilow		(as Stuttgart)	Michael Mohammed	Zachary James	Zachary James	Thomas Dehler	Zachary James	Lucinda Childs	Zachary James
		Hildegard Wensch/ David Warrilow	George Harewood	David Warrilow		Zachary James	Zachary James		Zachary James	Lucinda Childs	Zachary James
Young Tutankhamun	non-speaking role	—	—	—	—		Joshua Simpson/Dylan Rhodes (2016); Ewan Hawkins/Tylan Hernandez (2019)		Christian J. Conner	—	
	Two sisters		—	—	—		—	—	Rose Weissgerber/Sheva Tehoval; Ava Gesell	—	—
—	Small male chorus (priests), large opera chorus (the people of Egypt)										
Creative team											
Conductor		Dennis Russell Davies	Paul Daniel	(as Stuttgart)	Deirdre McClure	Karen Kamensek	Matthew Aucoin	Stephan Zillias	Karen Kamensek	Léo Warynski	Dalia Stasevska
Director		Achim Freyer	David Freeman	—	Ellen Sebastian Chang	Phelim McDermott	Phelim McDermott	Laura Scozzi	Phelim McDermott	—	Phelim McDermott
Set designer		Ilona and Achim Freyer	David Roger	—		Tom Pye	Tom Pye	Natascha Le Guen de Kerneizon	Tom Pye	—	Tom Pye
Lighting designer		Hanns-Joachim Haas	Richard Riddell		—	Bruno Poet; Gary James (2019)	Bruno Poet	Friedel Grass	Bruno Poet	—	Bruno Poet
Choreographer						Sean Gandini	Sean Gandini		Sean Gandini	—	Sean Gandini

== Music ==
The orchestra's size is about the size employed for early 19th-century opera: 2 flutes (one doubling piccolo), 2 oboes (both doubling oboe d'amore), 2 clarinets, bass clarinet, 2 bassoons, 2 french horns, 2 trumpets, 2 trombones, tuba, percussion (3 players), celesta (doubling synthesizer), 12 violas, 8 celli, and 6 double basses.

Since the Stuttgart State Opera house was being restored in 1984 and the orchestra pit of the Kleines Haus at the Stuttgart State Theatre, where the premiere was to take place, was considerably smaller, Glass chose to completely leave out the violins (about 20), giving the orchestra a darker, sombre character. Apart from this, this was Glass's most "conventional" opera orchestra until then (compared to Einstein on the Beach, written for the six-piece Philip Glass Ensemble, and Satyagraha, scored for woodwinds and strings only).

== Synopsis ==
The opera is divided into three acts:

=== Act 1: Year 1 of Akhnaten's Reign in Thebes ===
Thebes, 1370 BC

Prelude, verse 1, verse 2, verse 3

Set in the key of A minor, the strings introduce a ground bass theme, with following variations (a passacaglia). The scribe recites funeral texts from the pyramids. "Open are the double doors of the horizon; unlocked are its bolts."

Scene 1: Funeral of Akhnaten's father Amenhotep III

Heralded by hammering drums, Aye and a small male chorus chant a funeral hymn in Egyptian, later joined by the full chorus. The music is essentially a march, based on the chords of A major and F♯ minor (with added major sixth), and grows to ecstatic intensity towards the end.

Scene 2: The Coronation of Akhnaten

After a lengthy orchestral introduction, during which Akhnaten appears, heralded by a solo trumpet, the High Priest, Aye, and Horemhab sing a ritual text. After that, the Narrator recites a list of royal titles bestowed upon Akhnaten, while he is crowned. After the coronation, the chorus repeats the ritual text from the beginning of the scene. Again, the main key is A minor.

Scene 3: The Window of Appearances

After an introduction in A minor, dominated by tubular bells, Akhnaten sings a praise to the Creator (in Egyptian) at the window of public appearances. This is the first time he actually sings, after he has already been on stage for 20 minutes (and 40 minutes into the opera) and the effect of his countertenor voice (which in 1983 was even more rare than nowadays) is startling. He is joined by Queen Tye, whose soprano soars high above the soon intertwining voices of the royal couple, and later by Nefertiti, who actually sings lower notes than he.

=== Act 2: Years 5 to 15 in Thebes and Akhetaten ===
Scene 1: The Temple

The scene opens again in A minor, with the High Priest and a group of priests singing a hymn to Amun, principal god of the old order, in his temple. The music becomes increasingly dramatic, as Akhnaten, together with Queen Tye and his followers, attack the temple. This scene has only wordless singing. The harmonies grow very chromatic, finally reaching A♭ major and E minor. The temple roof is removed and the sun god Aten's rays invade the temple, thus ending Amun's reign and laying the foundation for the worship of the One God: the Sun God Aten.

Scene 2: Akhnaten and Nefertiti

Two solo celli introduce a "love theme". Accompanied by a solo trombone while the harmony switches to B(sus), the Narrator recites a prayer-like poem to the sun god. The strings softly take over the music in E minor, and the same poem is recited again, this time actually as a love poem from Akhnaten to Nefertiti. Then Akhnaten and Nefertiti sing the same text to each other (in Egyptian), as an intimate love duet. After a while, the trumpet associated with Akhnaten joins them as the highest voice, turning the duet into a trio.

Scene 3: The City – Dance

The Narrator speaks a text taken from the boundary stones of the new capital of the empire, Akhet-Aten (The Horizon of Aten), describing the construction of the city, with large, light-filled spaces. After a brass fanfare, the completion of the city is celebrated in a light-hearted dance, contrasting with the stark, ritualistic music with which this act began (in the Stuttgart premiere, the dance actually described the construction of the city). The dance scene was omitted from the UK premiere production and its 1987 revival.

Scene 4: Hymn

What now follows is a hymn to the only god Aten, a long aria (alternating between A minor and A major) by Akhnaten, and the central piece of the opera. Notably, it is the only text sung in the language of the audience, praising the sun giving life to everything. After the aria, an off-stage chorus sings Psalm 104 in Hebrew, dating some 400 years later, which has strong resemblances to Akhnaten's Hymn, thus emphasizing Akhnaten as the first founder of a monotheistic religion.

=== Act 3: Year 17 and the Present ===
Akhnaten, 1358 BC

Scene 1: The Family

Two oboes d'amore play the "love theme" from act 2. Akhnaten, Nefertiti and their six daughters, sing wordlessly in contemplation. They are oblivious to what happens outside of the palace. As the music switches from E minor to F minor, the Narrator reads letters from Syrian vassals, asking for help against their enemies. Since the king does not send troops, his land is being seized and plundered by their enemies. The scene focuses again on Akhnaten and his family, still oblivious to the country falling apart.

Scene 2: The Attack and Fall of the City

The music moves again to a vigorous F minor. Horemhab, Aye and the High Priest of Amon instigate the people (as the chorus), singing part of the vassal's letters (in their original Akkadian language) until finally the palace is attacked, the royal family killed, and the city of the sun destroyed.

Scene 3: The Ruins

The music of the very beginning of the opera returns. The scribe recites an inscription on Aye's tomb, praising the death of "the great criminal" and the new reign of the old gods. He then describes the restoration of Amun's temple by Akhnaten's son Tutankhamun. The Prelude music grows stronger and the scene moves to present-day Egypt, to the ruins of Amarna, the former capital Akhetaten. The Narrator appears as a modern tourist guide and speaks a text from a guide book, describing the ruins. "There is nothing left of this glorious city of temples and palaces."

Scene 4: Epilogue

The ghosts of Akhnaten, Nefertiti and Queen Tye appear, singing wordlessly amongst the ruins. The funeral procession from the beginning of the opera appears on the horizon, and they join it. The music introduces a bass line from the beginning of Einstein on the Beach, the first part of Glass's "portrait" trilogy (The second one being Satyagraha and the third one Akhnaten), thus providing a musical bracket for the whole trilogy.

== In popular culture ==
"Window of Appearances" and "Akhnaten and Nefertiti" feature in the seventh episode of the fourth season of the Netflix original series Stranger Things.
