= Michael McElroy (actor) =

American musical theater actor and singer

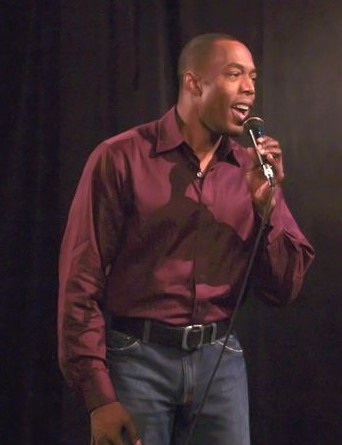
- Michael McElroy in 2009
- Born: April 18, 1967 (age 59); Shaker Heights, Ohio, USA
- Education: Carnegie Mellon University
- Occupations: Actor, Singer
- Employer: University of Michigan

Michael McElroy (born 1967) is a Grammy and Tony nominated American musical theatre actor, singer and music director.

== Early life and career ==
Born in Shaker Heights, Ohio, to Marcella Caffie, McElroy moved to New York City in May 1990 after earning his BFA in Theatre from Carnegie Mellon University. He made his Broadway debut in The High Rollers Social and Pleasure Club. He has since appeared in numerous productions, both on and off-Broadway, and in 2004 was nominated for a Tony Award for Best Featured Actor in a Musical for Big River. He has also been nominated for Drama Desk Awards for Violet and Big River. In 1995, McElroy appeared in the premiere performance of John Adams' opera I Was Looking at the Ceiling and Then I Saw the Sky in Berkeley, California.

In 1999, McElroy became the founder and director of the Broadway Inspirational Voices, a diverse, non-denominational gospel choir made up of Broadway singers. In the fall of 2021 McElroy was appointed as chair of the Musical Theatre Department at the University of Michigan School of Music, Theatre & Dance. McElroy resigned from the position in June, 2023. He now works as the Associate Dean at NYU's Tisch Institute of Performing Arts.

== Stage credits ==
=== Broadway ===
Year	Title	Role	Notes
1992	The High Rollers Social and Pleasure Club	Sorcerer	Broadway debut, Original Broadway production
1993	The Who's Tommy	Hawker	Original Broadway production
1997	Rent	Tom Collins	Replacement
1997	Street Corner Symphony	—N/a	Vocal arranger
2000	The Wild Party	Oscar D'Armano	Original Broadway production
2003	Big River	Jim	Revival
2010	Next To Normal	Dr. Madden/ Dr. Fine	Replacement
2016	Disaster!	—N/a	Vocal arranger
2017	Sunday In The Park With George	Ensemble u/s Jules/Bob u/s Boatman/Lee u/s Charles/Mr. u/s Billy/Louis	Revival

=== National Tour ===
- Big River (2004) - Jim
- Rent (2009) – Tom Collins

=== Off-Broadway ===
- Violet (1998) – Flick
- Hair (2001) – Hud
- Some Men (2007) – Marcus and others
- La Cage aux Folles (2026) - Francois

=== Workshops ===
- Spring Awakening (2001) – Masked Man
- PandA committee (2011)

== Filmography ==
=== Film ===
Year	Title	Role	Notes
1995	Stonewall	Princess Ernestine	
2005	Romance & Cigarettes	Ten Commandments Priest	
2008	Rent: Filmed Live on Broadway	Tom Collins	

=== Television ===
Year	Title	Role	Notes		
1999	Spin City	Gym manager	Episode: These Shoes Were Made for Cheatin'		
2001	Santa, Baby!	Voice	TV movie		
2001	Great Performances	Self	Season 28, My Favorite Broadway: The Love Songs		
2005	Great Performances	Judge / Captain / Crook	Season 32, Leonard Bernstein's 'Candide' with the New York Philharmonic		
2006	Love Monkey	Perky director	Episode: Confidence		
2008	Canterbury's Law	Assistant M.E. Barry Schulze	Episode: Baggage		
2019	Rent: Live	Alumni singer	uncredited		
2019	After Forever	Clifford	3 episodes		
2021	New Amsterdam (2018 TV series)	Singer #1	Season 3, episode 5	Episode: ‘’Blood, Sweat & Tears’’	Air date: ‘’2021-03-30’’

== Awards and nominations ==
Year	Award	Category	Nominated work	Result
1997	Drama Desk Award	Outstanding Featured Actor in a Musical	Violet	Nominated
2004	Drama Desk Award	Outstanding Actor in a Musical	Big River	Nominated
2004	Tony Award	Best Performance by a Featured Actor in a Musical	Big River	Nominated
2005	Grammy Award	Best Arrangement, Instrumental and Vocals	Joy to the World	Nominated
2019	Tony Award	Tony Honors for Excellence in Theatre		Honored
