= Dennis Parlato =

American dancer, actor, and singer (born 1947)

- Born: March 30, 1947 (age 78); Los Angeles, California, U.S.
- Occupation(s): Dancer, actor, singer

Dennis Parlato (born March 30, 1947, in Los Angeles) is an American dancer, actor, and singer.

== Early life and education ==
He is the son of Charlie Parlato, and the uncle of Grammy-nominated jazz singer Gretchen Parlato. Parlato taught high school English in San Francisco before realizing he wanted to perform. He was performing in chamber concert groups and teaching full-time. While on vacation with his first wife, they decided to see the ballet nearby just as something to do. He went to the Nederlands Dans Theater, a premier theatre company that, unbeknownst to him, was putting on a ballet of Carmina Burana. After watching the ballet, it inspired him when he got back home to switch to half-time teaching and study ballet. He met Austin Tichenor (of Reduced Shakespeare Company) when Parlato joined the Metropolitan Ballet of Oakland (not the Oakland Ballet) as a featured solo dancer and Tichenor was stage manager.

He moved to New York when he was thirty years old. His fiancée at the time Maggie Caponio had a scholarship to the New York City Ballet and he decided to go with her. He auditioned for everything, even though he had no formal vocal or acting lessons. He was cast in A Chorus Line and after that was able to afford proper lessons.

Parlato is probably best known for his work in soap operas, where he played Barton Crane on All My Children, Michael Grande on One Life to Live, and Clay Alden on Loving. He also portrayed Roger Thorpe on Guiding Light, stepping in for an ailing Michael Zaslow.

== Career ==
=== Broadway credits ===
- A Chorus Line (1977), understudy
- Chess (1988), Walter
- Sound of Music (1998), Captain George Von Trapp (replacement)
- Dirty Rotten Scoundrels (2005), understudy and Lawrence (replacement)

=== Off-Broadway/regional credits ===
- The Fantasticks (1985), El Gallo/Narrator
- Moby Dick (1986), Starbuck
- Have I Got a Girl For You! (1986), Igor
- Romance/Romance (1986)
- The Knife (1987), Dr. Bauer
- Shylock (1987), Antonio
- Violent Peace (1990)
- Hello Again (1993), The Husband
- Down By The Ocean (1994), Dan Bailey
- Jack's Holiday (1995), Inspector Thomas Byrnes
- Overtime (1996), Antonio
- Barefoot Boy with Shoes On (1999)
- When We Dead Awaken (2002), Rubek
- Guys and Dolls (2004), Sky Masterson
- Amazing Grace (2012), Captain Newton

=== Films ===
- The Dream Team (1989) -- TV newscaster
- Johnny Suede (1991) -- Dalton
- Bury the Evidence (1998) -- The Enforcer
- Rick (2003) -- BusinessTalk Anchor
- Delirious (2006) -- Royce Ralston
- Starting Out in the Evening (2007) -- Author
- Bride Wars (2009) -- Dance Instructor

=== Television ===
- All My Children (1985) - Barton Crane
- One Life to Live (1988-1990) - Michael Grande
- Loving (1992-1995) - Clay Alden #3
- Guiding Light (1997-1998) - Roger Thorpe
