= Patti Cohenour =

American actress and singer

Patti Cohenour (born October 17, 1952) is an American actress and singer. She last performed as the standby for Elizabeth Arden in the Broadway musical War Paint, a position she also held in the pre Broadway run. Previously she was seen in the Broadway production of The Light in the Piazza as Signora Naccarelli. She was also the alternate for Victoria Clark in the leading role of Margaret Johnson.

== Early life ==
Cohenour was born in Albuquerque, New Mexico, and graduated from Valley High School.

== Career ==
She originated the Broadway roles of Mary Jane in Big River, Rosa Bud in The Mystery of Edwin Drood (New York, London) and Mother Abbess in The Sound of Music (revival) and understudied Nora in A Doll's Life. She also starred in the Broadway production of The Phantom of the Opera, being the original alternate for Sarah Brightman as Christine Daaé. She later went on to replace Brightman in the role opposite Timothy Nolen, the first baritone Phantom and also the only bass baritone Phantom, and also has played the role of Christine opposite Colm Wilkinson in Toronto.

Additional credits: Mimi in La Bohème; Isabel/Mabel in The Pirates of Penzance (both New York Shakespeare Festival); Magnolia in Hal Prince’s Show Boat; Adeline in Sweet Adeline (Encores!); Katharine in The Taming of the Shrew (Syracuse Stage); Clarice in The Servant of Two Masters; Oh Coward! (Seattle Repertory Theatre); Glinda in The Wizard of Oz; Rosabella in The Most Happy Fella; Abigail Adams in 1776; Yvonne/Naomi in Sunday in the Park with George; Lily Craven in The Secret Garden (all 5th Avenue Theatre). Cohenour is the recipient of a Tony nomination, two Drama Desk nominations, the Clarence Derwent Award and a Theatre World Award. Her album To an Isle in the Water was produced by Grammy winner Thomas Z. Shepard and conducted by Paul Gemignani.

== Filmography ==
=== Television ===
Year	Title	Role	Notes
1982	The Powers of Matthew Star	Stewardess	Episode: "The Triangle"
1983	Happy Days	Susie	Episode: "May the Best Man Win"
2000	The Wonderful World of Disney	Featured	Episode: "Geppetto"
2006	Live from Lincoln Center	Signora Naccarelli	Episode: "The Light in the Piazza"

=== Stage ===
Year	Title	Role	Notes
1982	A Doll's Life	Helga	Mark Hellinger Theatre, Broadway
1984	La Bohème	Mimi	The Public Theater, Off-Broadway
1985	Big River	Mary Jane Wilkes	Eugene O'Neill Theatre, Broadway
1985	The Mystery of Edwin Drood	Rosa Bud / Miss Deirdre Peregrine	Imperial Theatre, Broadway
1988	The Phantom of the Opera	Christine Daaé (Understudy)	Majestic Theatre, Broadway
1989	My Fair Lady	Eliza Doolittle	Opera Pacific
1989	The Taming of the Shrew	Katherina	Syracuse Stage
1994	Show Boat	Magnolia Hawks	Ford Centre for the Performing Arts
1996	The Desert Song	Margot Bonvalet	Pittsburgh CLO
1997	Sweet Adeline	Addie Schmidt	New York City Center, Off-Broadway
1998	The Sound of Music	The Mother Abbess	Martin Beck Theatre, Broadway
1999	The Secret Garden	Lily Craven	5th Avenue Theatre
1999	Oh, Coward!	Performer	Seattle Repertory Theatre
2001	The Servant of Two Masters	Clarice	Intiman Theatre
2001	1776	Abigail Adams	5th Avenue Theatre
2002	The Most Happy Fella	Rosabella	5th Avenue Theatre
2003	The Wizard of Oz	Glinda the Good Witch/Aunt Em	5th Avenue Theatre
2005	The Light in the Piazza	Signora Naccarelli	Vivian Beaumont Theater, Broadway
2007	To Kill a Mockingbird	Maude Atkinson	Intiman Theatre
2007	Souvenir	Florence Foster Jenkins	Union Arts Center
2008	Souvenir	Florence Foster Jenkins	San Jose Repertory Theatre
2009	Sunday in the Park with George	Yvonne/Naomi	5th Avenue Theatre
2012	The Sound of Music	The Mother Abbess	Drury Lane Theatre
2012	Damn Yankees	Meg Boyd	Paper Mill Playhouse
2012	Chicago	Mary Sunshine	The Muny
2013	Grey Gardens	Little Edie	5th Avenue Theatre
2014	The Light in the Piazza	Margaret Johnson	South Coast Repertory
2014	A Room With a View	Charlotte Bartlett	5th Avenue Theatre
2014	Bright Star	Mama Murphy	Old Globe Theatre
2017	War Paint	Elizabeth Arden (Standby)	Nederlander Theatre, Broadway
2018	You Are Here	Diana	Goodspeed Opera House
