= Jana Schneider =

American photojournalist (born 1951)

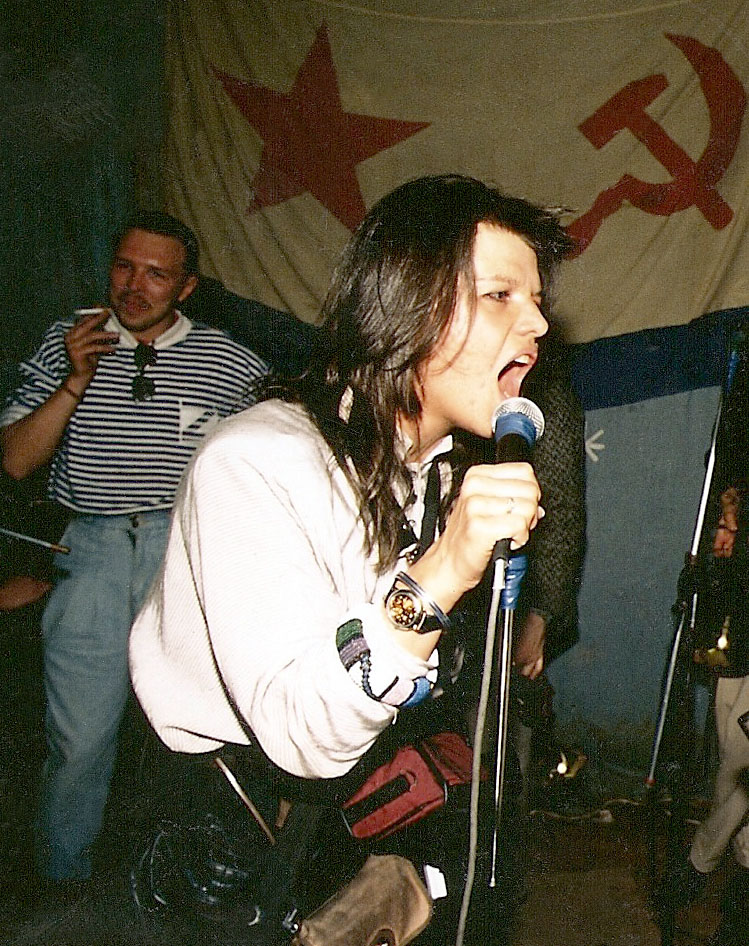
Jana Schneider sings in Moscow's Gorky Park with Garik Sukachev and his band "Brigada S". Photo by Mikhail Evstafiev

Janet Ann Schneider (born October 24, 1951, in McFarland, Wisconsin) is an American actress and photojournalist.

== Early life ==
Schneider studied at the University of Wisconsin.

Passionate about drama, she moved to New York City in 1974, hoping to break into theater.

== Career ==
=== Acting ===
In New York City, Schneider found herself performing in productions such as Shenandoah, The Robber Bridegroom, and Othello. Later, on Broadway, she was nominated for a 1986 Tony Award as Best Featured Actress in a Musical for the role Helena Landless in The Mystery of Edwin Drood and won a 1986 Drama Desk Award for Outstanding Featured Actress in a Musical for her role in The Mystery of Edwin Drood.

In addition to two film appearances, she appeared on television in The Equalizer in the 1986 episode "Heartstrings" as the Kidnapping Nurse.

=== Photojournalism ===
In the late 1980s, Schneider decided to pursue photojournalism. She worked for several photo agencies, including Sipa Press. Her work was published in Time, Newsweek, Stern and other newspapers and magazines.

In 1992, she covered the Siege of Sarajevo. Retired Maj. Gen. Lewis MacKenzie, the Canadian commander of the United Nations forces in the former Yugoslav city said of Schneider, "She was like a breath of fresh air, vivacious in the midst of all those stinky male journalists. I was impressed by her dedication. I told her she would end up either famous or dead." Schneider was badly wounded when a tank shell fired from Serb positions exploded next to her. Her friend, Ivo Štandeker, a journalist from Slovenia, was killed. Schneider spent many weeks in the hospital, first with the UN and later in Belgrade, where doctors saved her leg from amputation.

Schneider returned to Wisconsin from Bosnia, deeply depressed. She began to focus more on the victims of war. Among them was her friend Darja Lebar, a Slovenian journalist in Sarajevo who had suffered a gunshot to the face, a few months following the death of Standeker. Schneider helped Lebar raise money for her operations, facial reconstruction, and gave her shelter at her parents' home in Wisconsin. After Lebar returned to Sarajevo, Schneider has not returned back to journalism.

== Personal life ==
In 1986, Schneider married musician and composer Tom Wilson. They separated not long after marrying.
