= Ed Dixon =

American actor

Ed Dixon (born September 2, 1948 in Oklahoma) is an American character actor, playwright and composer.

== Actor ==
Dixon has appeared in numerous Broadway shows, including No, No, Nanette, The King of Schnorrers, The Three Musketeers, Les Misérables (the show's 2nd and longest running Thenardier), Cyrano, The Scarlet Pimpernel, The Iceman Cometh, The Best Man, How the Grinch Stole Christmas, Sunday in the Park with George, Mary Poppins and Anything Goes. In 1987 he was nominated for a Drama Desk Award for his performance in the musical Shylock, for which he wrote the book, music, and lyrics.

Dixon was a soloist in the Kennedy Center's premiere production of Leonard Bernstein's Mass and is on the recording conducted by the composer. He can also be heard on the cast recording of the 2001 national tour of The Best Little Whorehouse in Texas. Dixon toured as the Governor opposite Ann-Margret as Miss Mona and Gary Sandy as Ed Earl Dodd. He was nominated for the Helen Hayes Award for best supporting actor in a musical in Kathy Lee Gifford's Saving Aimee and won the 2010 Helen Hayes Award for best supporting actor in a musical for his turn as Max in the Sunset Boulevard, a role he also played in the 1996 US tour. For his creation, Georgie: My Adventures with George Rose off-Broadway, he won the 2017 Drama Desk Award for best solo performance. In 2018, he played Judge Turpin opposite Terrence Mann in the title role of Sweeney Todd: The Demon Barber of Fleet Street at the Connecticut Repertory Theatre.

== Broadway and touring credits ==
Year(s)	Production	Role	Notes
1971-1973	No, No, Nanette	Nanette's Friend	Broadway
1973	The Student Prince	Count Hugo	US Tour
1976-1977	Very Good Eddie	M. de Rougemont	US Tour
1979-1980	King of Schnorrers	Isaac / Belasco / Chancellor	Broadway
1984	The Three Musketeers	Cardinal Richelieu	Broadway
1986	Pippin	Charles	US Tour
1988-1991	Les Misérables	Thénardier / Chain Gang	Broadway
1993-1994	Cyrano: The Musical	Ragueneau	Broadway
1995	Pippin	Charles	Broadway
1996-1997	Sunset Boulevard	Max von Mayerling	US Tour
1997-1998	The Scarlet Pimpernel	Ozzy	Broadway
1999	The Iceman Cometh	Piet Wetjoen	Broadway
2000	The Best Man	Senator Clyde Carlin u/s Ex-President Arthur Hockstader	Broadway
2001-2002	The Best Little Whorehouse in Texas	Traveling Salesman / C. J. Scruggs / Governor	US Tour
2005	Doctor Dolittle	Albert Blossom u/s Dr. John P. Dolittle	US Tour
2007-2008	Dr. Seuss' How the Grinch Stole Christmas! The Musical	Old Max	Broadway
2008	Sunday in the Park with George	Mr. / Charles Redmond	Broadway
2011	Mary Poppins	Admiral Boom / Bank Chairman	Broadway
2012	Anything Goes	The Captain	Broadway

== Playwright & composer ==
Dixon is the author/composer of Fanny Hill, which debuted in New York at The York Theatre after being launched at Goodspeed Musicals. Fanny Hill was nominated for two Drama Desk Awards and one Drama-Logue Award. Dixon also wrote the musical Richard Cory with noted playwright A. R. Gurney. The musical won the Festival Prize and the Audience Award when it debuted at the New York Musical Theatre Festival. His latest work, Whodunit... The Musical, based on The Circular Staircase by Mary Roberts Rinehart, has gained critical acclaim in regional venues throughout the United States.

== Memoirs ==
Dixon released his memoir SECRETS OF A LIFE ON STAGE... AND OFF on May 3, 2012.
