= Big River (musical) =

1984 stage musical by Roger Miller and William Hauptman

- The Adventures of Huckleberry Finn
- Original Cast Recording
- Music: Roger Miller
- Lyrics: Roger Miller
- Book: William Hauptman
- Basis: Adventures of Huckleberry Finn by Mark Twain
- Productions: 1985 Broadway; 2003 Broadway revival 2004 US Tour; 2008 East Haddam, Connecticut
- Awards: Tony Award for Best Musical; Tony Award for Best Book; Tony Award for Best Score

Big River: The Adventures of Huckleberry Finn is a musical with music and lyrics by Roger Miller, and a book by William Hauptman.

Based on Mark Twain's classic 1884 novel, Adventures of Huckleberry Finn, it features music in the bluegrass and country styles in keeping with the setting of the novel. The 1985 Broadway production ran for more than 1,000 performances and remained one of the few very successful American musicals in the mid-1980s among the emerging successes coming from Great Britain. Big River won seven Tony Awards, including Best Musical.

== Productions ==
The first productions were staged by the American Repertory Theater in Cambridge, Massachusetts, in February 1984 and at the La Jolla Playhouse in San Diego, California, from June through July 1984.

The Broadway production, directed by Des McAnuff and choreographed by Janet Watson, opened on April 25, 1985, at the Eugene O'Neill Theatre, and closed on September 20, 1987, running for 1,005 performances. The cast featured René Auberjonois as the Duke, Bob Gunton as the King, John Goodman as Pap Finn, Daniel H. Jenkins as Huckleberry Finn, and Ron Richardson as Jim, with Susan Browning, Gordon Connell as Mark Twain, Patti Cohenour, Jennifer Leigh Warren as Alice's Daughter, and John Short.

A critically acclaimed revival, directed and choreographed by Jeff Calhoun, opened on Broadway on July 24, 2003, at the American Airlines Theatre, where it ran for 67 performances and 28 previews. This production, produced by the Roundabout Theatre Company and Deaf West Theatre, was notable in that it featured both deaf and hearing actors performing together. About half the characters, including the leading role of Huck, were played by deaf or hard-of-hearing performers. All dialogue and lyrics in the production were both spoken or sung and signed, making the production equally accessible to hearing and deaf audiences. The character of Mark Twain was expanded, so that the actor (Daniel H. Jenkins, who portrayed the role of Huck in the original Broadway cast) also provided the voice of Huck, portrayed by Tyrone Giordano, who is deaf.

It was remounted for a U.S. tour, which ran from June 11, 2004, to May 31, 2005, and included most of the Broadway cast, and was nominated for several regional awards. A production ran at Ford's Theatre in Washington, DC, from March 18 to June 4, 2005.

Goodspeed Musicals staged a production of the musical at the East Haddam, Connecticut, theater. The production was directed by Rob Ruggiero and ran from September 26 to November 29, 2008.

The Encores! staged concert opened on February 8, 2017, and ran to February 12, 2017. The production was directed by Lear deBessonet and starred Kyle Scatliffe as Jim, Nicholas Barasch as Huckleberry Finn, Christopher Sieber as the Duke, Lauren Worsham as Mary Jane Wilkes, and David Pittu as the King.

=== International ===
An Australian production starring Cameron Daddo as Huckleberry Finn, Jon English as Pap Finn, and John Bell as the Duke, and featuring Venetta Fields and Michael Edward Stevens, opened in 1989 at Her Majesty's Theatre, Sydney. It also played Her Majesty's Theatre, Melbourne, with Marcia Hines, as well as Festival Theatre in Adelaide.

== Synopsis ==
=== Act One ===
In pre-Civil War Missouri, near St. Petersburg, the vagabond child Huckleberry Finn describes the events by which Tom Sawyer and he had discovered a fortune. Huck has been adopted by the Widow Douglas and her unmarried sister Miss Watson, and his guardians, Judge Thatcher, Huck's best friend Tom Sawyer, and practically the entire town informs Huck that he needs to learn to read and write and read the Bible if he ever hopes to go to Heaven ("Do Ya Wanna Go To Heaven?"). The only one who does not attempt to pass judgment on Huck is Miss Watson's slave, Jim, who predicts that he will lead a life of "considerable trouble and considerable joy". Exasperated with the constraints on his daily life, Huck escapes his bedtime and steals away to Tom Sawyer's "hideout", an old cave. In the cave, Tom, Huck, and a group of their friends plan to form a band of robbers who will rampage around the countryside ("The Boys").

Huck, on his way home, thinks about the confines of his life and his wish that he will find meaning in his life ("Waitin' For the Light To Shine"). Huck returns home in the darkness to find his Pap, a violent drunk waiting for him, who drags him off to his cabin in the woods. In his drunkenness, Pap swings from tomfoolery to extreme violence as he rails against a government that would take his son (and his son's money) away from him ("Guv'ment"). Pap attempts to kill Huck, hallucinating that he is the Angel of Death, but passes out in an inebriated mess. The next day, Pap goes off to trade and Huck takes the opportunity to escape. He kills a pig and scatters the blood and gore around the cabin to make it appear as if he hss been murdered. Huck reflects that this is just the sort of thing Tom Sawyer would do, and Tom appears to sing a vaudeville-style turn about the usefulness of hogs ("Hand for the Hog").

Huck flees to the nearby Jackson's Island, where he, alone, asserts his self-assurance ("I, Huckleberry, Me"), but Huck is not alone; Miss Watson's slave, Jim, is there, as well. He has run away to avoid being sold down the river to New Orleans. Despite his unease with the concept of abolitionism, Huck offers to help Jim reach freedom in the North. A posse is after Jim; with only moments to spare, they find a raft and get it afloat in the mighty Mississippi River ("Muddy Water").

Jim and Huck travel only at night and do not get far from Jackson's Island before they are reminded of the seriousness of their actions; a boat carrying runaway slaves back to their masters passes them in the night ("The Crossing"). The days are long as the two forge their way up the river. They pass a flooded house, and a dead man floating in the water that Jim will not let Huck look at. As they sing of the beauty of the river ("River in the Rain") in a fog, they sail past the mouth of the Ohio — their path to freedom. Soon after, they pick up two drifters who commandeer the small raft as they escape the latest mob on their tail. The con men claim to be a Duke and a King, the long-lost heirs to the Duchy of Bridgewater and the French throne. Huck is intrigued by the delinquent "royals". The King and the Duke commandeer the raft and plot to sell Jim back into slavery for their own profit, unbeknownst to Huck ("When the Sun Goes Down in the South").

=== Act Two ===
Huck, Jim, the Duke, and the King wash ashore in Bricktown, Arkansas, and attempt to fleece the rubes they find. The Duke and King come up with a scheme to make money ("The Royal Nonesuch"), tricking the townspeople. By the end of the evening, Huck can appreciate a new way of life — the three are now several hundred dollars richer. When he returns to the raft, Huck plays a horrible trick on Jim by assuming the guise of a slave hunter. Unamused, Jim rebukes Huck for the first time. After some thought, Huck realizes that Jim, though a slave, is still a human being and deserves an apology ("Worlds Apart").

The King and Duke reappear to dragoon Huck into their next escapade. While Jim is, again, left alone with the raft, the three encounter a young fool on a dock, singing of his love of his home state ("Arkansas"). Through no fault of his own, he tells the con men everything they need to know about a fortune to be inherited in the Wilkes family, and they crash the funeral as impostors to go about securing their riches ("How Blest We Are"). Huck — through it all a pure soul — sees that the beautiful and innocent Mary Jane Wilkes is being robbed of her rightful inheritance by these "rapscallions", and steals back her money from the King and the Duke as she mourns her father's coffin ("You Oughta Be Here with Me"). He quickly stuffs the gold into her father's coffin and hides behind it to avoid notice.

When Mary Jane realizes what Huck has done, she asks that he remain with her and become her friend. For the first time in his life, he is moved by the actions of another ("Leavin's Not the Only Way to Go"), yet he realizes that he has made a promise to Jim, one that transcends mere friendship. Huck returns again to the raft and finds the Duke tarred and feathered; he has sold Jim back into slavery for a mere $40. Feeling guilty about what he has done, Huck pens a letter to Miss Watson, telling her where she can find the runaway Jim. After a momentary reprieve, Huck ends up feeling worse than ever. He tears up the letter and resolves to free Jim again, even if it means he will go to Hell ("Waiting for the Light to Shine" (Reprise)).

Huck visits Mr. Phelps, the farmer to whom Jim has been sold, and is shocked to discover that he has been mistaken for Tom Sawyer, the Phelps' nephew, who is expected for a visit. Tom arrives later and is intercepted by Huck before he reaches the farm. Huck explains everything and Tom, delighted by the prospect for a grand adventure, decides to help Huck free Jim from his captors while pretending to be his own brother Sid. They find Jim imprisoned in a tiny cell and work to free him, as he laments his desire to be free ("Free at Last"). Progress is slowed by Tom's insistence on making sure that the circumstances of the escape match the adventure novels he has read, which includes notifying Phelps of the escape by an anonymous letter. As they free Jim, Tom is shot in the leg. Jim sacrifices his freedom to ensure Tom gets a doctor and is about to be locked up again, when Tom admits that Miss Watson has died, freeing Jim in her will.

Jim decides to continue his trek to the North, so he may buy his family out of slavery, and Huck decides to continue westwards to escape any attempts to "civilize" him. They sit for a moment at the banks of the river, recalling their adventures together ("River in the Rain" (Reprise)). Jim reveals to Huck that the body they saw in the water was the dead body of Huck's Pap. Jim leaves Huck alone for the last time, and Huck decides, "It was like the fortune Jim predicted long ago, considerable trouble and considerable joy." He begins his next journey ("Muddy Water" (Reprise)).

== Songs ==
Act I

- "Do Ya Wanna Go to Heaven?" — Company
- "The Boys" — Tom, Huck, Boys
- "Waitin' for the Light to Shine" — Huck
- "Guv'ment" — Pap
- "Hand for the Hog" — Tom
- "I, Huckleberry, Me" — Huck
- "Muddy Water" — Jim, Huck
- "The Crossing" — Slaves
- "River in the Rain" — Huck, Jim
- "When the Sun Goes Down in the South" — Duke, King, Huck, Jim

Act II

- "The Royal Nonesuch" — Duke, Huck, Company
- "Worlds Apart" — Jim, Huck
- "Arkansas/How Blest We Are" — Young Fool, Alice's Daughter, Company
- "You Oughta Be Here with Me" — Mary Jane, Joanna, Susan
- "How Blest We Are" (reprise) — Company
- "Leavin's Not the Only Way to Go" — Huck, Mary Jane, Jim
- "Waitin' for the Light to Shine" (reprise) — Huck, Slaves
- "Free at Last" — Jim, Slaves
- "River in the Rain" (reprise) — Huck, Jim
- "Muddy Water" (reprise) — Company

== Principal casts ==
Character	La Jolla (1984)	Broadway (1985)	Tour (1986)	Tour (1987)	Broadway Revival (2003)	Tour (2004)	Encores! Production (2017)
Huckleberry Finn	Tuck Milligan	Daniel Jenkins	Brian Lane Green	Romain Frugé	Tyrone Giordano; Daniel Jenkins (voice)	Tyrone Giordano; Daniel Jenkins (voice)	Nicholas Barasch
Jim	Ben Halley, Jr.	Ron Richardson	Ron Richardson	Michael Edward-Stevens	Michael McElroy	Michael McElroy	Kyle Scatliffe
The Duke	Dann Florek	René Auberjonois	Richard Levine	Michael Calkins	Troy Kotsur; Walter Charles (voice)	Troy Kotsur; James Judy (voice)	Christopher Sieber
The King	Ron Faber	Bob Gunton	Michael McCarty	Walker Joyce	Lyle Kanouse	Erick Devine	David Pittu
Tom Sawyer	Paul McCrane	John Short	Roger Bart	Barry Lee	Michael Arden	Christopher Hanke	Charlie Franklin
Mary Jane Wilkes	Melanie Chartoff	Patti Cohenour	Jessie J. Richards	Carolee Carmello	Melissa van der Schyff	Melissa van der Schyff	Lauren Worsham
Mark Twain	N/A	Gordon Connell	Gordon G. Jones	Kevin Cooney	Daniel Jenkins	Daniel Jenkins	N/A
Widow Douglas	Dee Hoty	Susan Browning	Laurie Franks	Frances Ford	Gina Ferrall	Cathy Newman	Cass Morgan
Miss Watson	N/A	Evalyn Baron	Karen Looze	Lucinda Hitchcock Cone	Phyllis Frelich; Melissa van der Schyff (voice)	Deanna Bray; Melissa van der Schyff (voice)	Annie Golden
Pap Finn	John Goodman	John Goodman	T.J. Meyers	Dale Radunz	Troy Kotsur; Lyle Kanouse (voice)	Troy Kotsur; Erick Devine (voice)	Wayne Duvall
Alice	Leah Maddrie	Carol Dennis	N/A	Gwen Stewart	Gwen Stewart	Gwen Stewart	Patrice Covington
Alice's Daughter	N/A	Jennifer Leigh Warren	Mary Denise Bentley	Angela Hall	Christina Ellison Dunams; Gwen Stewart (voice)	Christina Ellison Dunams; Gwen Stewart (voice)	Katherine A. Guy

== Awards and nominations ==
=== Original Broadway production ===
Year	Award	Category	Nominee	Result
1985	Tony Award	Best Musical		Won
1985	Tony Award	Best Book of a Musical	William Hauptman	Won
1985	Tony Award	Best Original Score	Roger Miller	Won
1985	Tony Award	Best Performance by a Featured Actor in a Musical	Ron Richardson	Won
1985	Tony Award	Best Performance by a Featured Actor in a Musical	Daniel H. Jenkins	Nominated
1985	Tony Award	Best Performance by a Featured Actor in a Musical	René Auberjonois	Nominated
1985	Tony Award	Best Direction of a Musical	Des McAnuff	Won
1985	Tony Award	Best Scenic Design	Heidi Landesman	Won
1985	Tony Award	Best Costume Design	Patricia McGourty	Nominated
1985	Tony Award	Best Lighting Design	Richard Riddell	Won
1985	Drama Desk Award	Outstanding Actor in a Musical	Ron Richardson	Won
1985	Drama Desk Award	Outstanding Actor in a Musical	Daniel H. Jenkins	Nominated
1985	Drama Desk Award	Outstanding Featured Actor in a Musical	René Auberjonois	Won
1985	Drama Desk Award	Outstanding Featured Actor in a Musical	John Short	Nominated
1985	Drama Desk Award	Outstanding Featured Actor in a Musical	Bob Gunton	Nominated
1985	Drama Desk Award	Outstanding Featured Actor in a Musical	John Goodman	Nominated
1985	Drama Desk Award	Outstanding Featured Actress in a Musical	Patti Cohenour	Nominated
1985	Drama Desk Award	Outstanding Orchestrations	Steven Margoshes and Danny Troob	Won
1985	Drama Desk Award	Outstanding Lyrics	Roger Miller	Won
1985	Drama Desk Award	Outstanding Music	Roger Miller	Nominated
1985	Drama Desk Award	Outstanding Set Design	Heidi Landesman	Won
1985	Drama Desk Award	Outstanding Costume Design	Patricia McGourty	Won
1985	Drama Desk Award	Outstanding Lighting Design	Richard Riddell	Won
1985	Theatre World Award		Patti Cohenour	Won

=== 2003 Broadway revival ===
Year	Award	Category	Nominee	Result
2004	Tony Award	Best Revival of a Musical		Nominated
2004	Tony Award	Best Performance by a Featured Actor in a Musical	Michael McElroy	Nominated
2004	Tony Award	Tony Honors for Excellence in Theatre		Won
2004	Drama Desk Award	Outstanding Revival of a Musical		Nominated
2004	Drama Desk Award	Outstanding Actor in a Musical	Tyrone Giordano	Nominated
2004	Drama Desk Award	Outstanding Actor in a Musical	Michael McElroy	Nominated
2004	Drama Desk Award	Outstanding Director of a Musical	Jeff Calhoun	Nominated

== Feature film adaptation ==
On January 16, 2024, producers of the original stage musical and Roger Miller's widow Mary Miller hired Douglas Lyons to write a screenplay for a feature film adaptation.
