= Shylock (musical) =

Shylock is a musical based on Shakespeare's The Merchant of Venice, adapted and composed by Ed Dixon debuted at the York Theatre in 1987 with Dixon in the title role. The performance garnered him a Drama Desk nomination for Best Actor in a Musical. The cast included Lisa Vroman, Charles Pistone, Dennis Parlato, Ann Brown and Joel Fredricks. Kathline Rubbico was musical director with sets and costumes by James Morgan and lighting by Marcia Madeira. Lloyd Battista was the director. According to Dixon, Shylock was an attempt to sympathetically explain the motivations of the eponymous character.
