= The Yellow Sound =

1909 play by Wassily Kandinski

Der Gelbe Klang The Yellow Sound
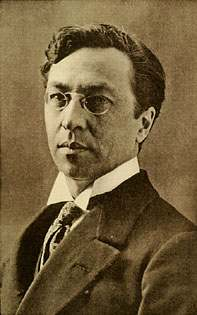
- Kandinsky in 1913, a year after the experimental theater piece was published
- Original language: German
- Written by: Wassily Kandinsky
- Genre: Color-tone drama

Premiere
- Date: 12 May 1972
- Place: Guggenheim Museum, New York City

The Yellow Sound (in German, Der Gelbe Klang) is an experimental theater piece originated by the Russian artist Wassily Kandinsky. Created in 1909, the work was first published in The Blue Rider Almanac in 1912.

The Yellow Sound was the "earliest and most influential" of four "color-tone dramas" that Kandinsky conceived for the theater between 1909 and 1914; the others were titled The Green Sound, Black and White, and Violet. Kandinsky's pieces were part of a larger trend of their era that addressed color theory and synesthesia in works that blended multiple art forms and media. Such works — Scriabin's Prometheus (1910) is arguably among the best known — utilized lighting techniques and other innovations to extend the normal range of artistic expression. Kandinsky had published his own theory on color and synesthesia in his Concerning the Spiritual in Art (1911).

Kandinsky never saw The Yellow Sound performed during his lifetime. He and his Blue Rider colleagues, including Franz Marc, August Macke, and Alfred Kubin, worked intensively on a planned 1914 Munich production, but it was cancelled by the outbreak of World War I. (That original production was perhaps intended for Georg Fuchs's Künstlertheater, which had the lighting facilities required by the project.) Two subsequent German productions, one at the Bauhaus, also failed to materialize.

The work had its belated world premiere on 12 May 1972 at the Guggenheim Museum and has since been staged (in various levels of authenticity and completeness) at the Theatre des Champs-Élysées, Paris (4 March 1976) and on 9 February 1982, at the Marymount Manhattan Theatre in New York City. There has also been productions at the Alte Oper, Frankfurt am Main (7–8 September 1982) the Theatre im National, Bern Switzerland (12–15 February 1987) and the NIA Centre, Manchester on 21 March 1992. Productions of The Yellow Sound have been mounted with three musical scores in three countries. The American production employed a rearrangement based on ideas from the lost original score (composed by Thomas de Hartmann) by Gunther Schuller, while a French production used a score by Anton Webern, and a Russian production one by Alfred Schnittke. The show was remounted with puppets in New York City in November, 2010, by Target Margin Theatre Co. at The Brick Theater. On 10 April 2011 The Yellow Sound has been performed in Lugano (Palazzo dei Congressi) with the original score composed by Carlo Ciceri. November 2011 also saw a full production of the stage composition with fragments of original score performed at Tate Modern, London, UK. This was commissioned as part of the Blaue Reiter Centenary Celebrations.

The Yellow Sound is a one-act opera without dialogue or conventional plot, divided into six "pictures." A child in white and an adult performer in black represent life and death; other figures are costumed in single colors, including five "intensely yellow giants (as large as possible)" and "vague red creatures, somewhat suggesting birds...."

Drawing on elements of Symbolism and Expressionism (while and anticipating Surrealism), Kandinsky's work had a strong influence on German theater innovator Lothar Schreyer, who "built a whole theory of performance on the expressive process first suggested in The Yellow Sound."

== See also ==
- Die glückliche Hand
