= William Hauptman =

American dramatist

William Hauptman (born 1942) is an American writer. Born in Texas, he received a bachelor of fine arts degree from the University of Texas at Austin Drama Department and later traveled to San Francisco and New York. A graduate with a master of fine arts degree from the Yale School of Drama, he is the author of plays and fiction.

== Career ==
His various plays include Shearwater (American Place Theater 1974), Heat (The Public Theater 1974), and Comanche Cafe and Domino Courts (American Place Theatre 1976), which won a Village Voice Obie Award in 1977.

Big River (1985), his adaptation of Mark Twain's Huckleberry Finn, written in collaboration with composer Roger Miller, won seven Tony Awards, including Best Musical and Best Book of a Musical when it opened on Broadway. It has proven very popular in stock and amateur theatrical productions. Hauptman joined the project after being approached by former Yale classmate Rocco Landesman.

Hauptman is also a writer of fiction. His first published story, "Good Rockin' Tonight", about an Elvis impersonator, made the Best American Short Stories Collection of 1982. Later, Hauptman wrote a screenplay of this story for 20th Century Fox, going on to write several other screenplays for the studios, including Amblin Entertainment and Merchant Ivory Productions.

Bantam published his collection of short stories, including Good Rockin' Tonight and Other Stories (1988). Larry McMurtry gave him this quote: "William Hauptman, for my money, is the most promising young fiction writer to come out of the Southwest in a long time." This collection won the Jesse Jones Award for Best Work of Fiction given by the Texas Institute of Letters in 1989, along with an award for Best Short Story, which was given to "Moon Walking".

In 1992, Bantam published his novel about tornado-chasers The Storm Season, which was later reprinted by the University of Texas Press. This novel was praised by Carolyn See in the Los Angeles Times, who said, "Storm Season is about family, the working class, the crimes human beings have committed against the land, and the hypnotic, redemptive quality of disaster--why human beings enjoy being scared out of their wits. It's spooky, beautiful, bizarre."

His most recent novel, about his experiences in the '60s, is called Journey to the West (2017), which has been described by James Magnuson, director of the Michener Center at the University of Texas as "by turns hilarious, sweet, and harrowing...It deserves to be a classic."

Big River also was produced by the Deaf West Company in both Los Angeles (2002) and New York (2003) at the American Airlines Theater and received a Tony Award for Best Revival of a Musical. Big River was also produced as part of the Encores Series at City Center Theater in New York City in 2017. Program Notes: From Playbill of Encores Production of Big River, 2016: "It was a time when everybody played by the rules of Satchel Paige: Don't worry about the things you can't do nothing about, dance like nobody's watching, and love like you can't get hurt."

He has also contributed articles to The Atlantic Monthly, Texas Monthly, and The New York Times Sunday magazine. His teaching experience includes Yale School of Drama, the Michener Center for writers at the University of Texas in Austin, and Brooklyn College.

== Awards ==
- 1979 NAACP Freedom Foundation Award - PBS teleplay Denmark Vesey, starring Ned Beatty and Yaphet Kotto, - winner
- 1985 *Tony Award for Best Musical - Big River - winner
- 1986 Los Angeles Drama Critics Circle Award for Best Play, Gillette - winner
- 1988 Jesse Jones Award for Best Book from the Texas Institute of Letters for Good Rockin' Tonight - winner
- 2003 *Tony Award for Best Revival of a Musical by the Deaf West Company of Los Angeles, Big River, at the American Airlines Theatre in New York - winner'
- Grants: National Endowment Grant, Rockefeller Grant, Guggenheim Grant
  Honors: The author has also been included in the exclusive Texas Writer's Collection at Texas State University.

== Personal life ==
Hauptman is married to Marjorie Erdreich and lives in Brooklyn. His daughter, Sarah, is employed by the State Department and their son, Max, is a captain in the United States Army. "I live in Brooklyn because, for all its faults, I like it better than the town where I was born. My days are calm and predetermined. I watch my children grow up and hope they will do well." -Journey to the West
