= Leilani Jones =

American actress (born 1957)

- Born: May 14, 1957 (age 69); Oahu, Hawaii, United States
- Occupation: Actress
- Years active: 1982–present
- Spouse: Larry Wilmore (m. 1994; div. 2017)

Leilani Jones (born May 14, 1957) is an American actress. Jones played the role of Chiffon for 5 years in the original cast of Little Shop of Horrors. Jones next went on to play the role of Satin in the original Broadway production of Grind for which she won a Tony as Best Featured Actress in a Musical and a Drama Desk Award for her performance.

After Grind, she appeared in small roles on film and television and did voiceover work for video games, most notably Voodoo Lady in Monkey Island and the voice of the computer in Where in the World Is Carmen Sandiego?. Leilani has been an Audio Narrator, describing movies and TV shows for the Blind and low vision community for over 25 years.

== Early life ==
Jones was born in Oahu, Hawaii on 14 May 1957, the eldest of three children. Her father was an Air Force officer and her mother an English teacher. Jones attended a private prep school before attending the University of Hawaii.

== Career ==
Jones originated the role of Chiffon at the WPA Theater in the original cast of Little Shop of Horrors. Marlene Danielle replaced her for a few weeks when the show opened Off Broadway at the Orpheum Theater. Jones resumed her role at that time and played the part for three more years. In total, she played the role for 5 years. Jones also recorded the role on the original cast recording.

Jones next went on to play the role of Satin, a stripper at a Chicago burlesque house, in the original Broadway production of Grind. Jones won a Tony as Best Featured Actress in a Musical and a Drama Desk Award for her performance.

After leaving Grind, Jones married and she appeared only in small roles in a few movies and television shows and did voiceover work for video games, most notably portraying the voice performance of the Voodoo Lady in the popular video games series of Monkey Island, the voice of the computer in Where in the World Is Carmen Sandiego?, as well as serving as the narrator for the descriptive video service sections for various television shows and films.

In 2005, Jones reprised her role of Chiffon in New York at a Broadway Cares/Equity Fights AIDS fundraiser.

== Personal life ==
After leaving Grind, Jones married writer, actor and television producer Larry Wilmore. She and Wilmore divorced during his move to New York to become a host on Comedy Central. Jones currently lives in San Marino, California with her two children.

== Filmography ==
=== Film ===
Year	Title	Role	Notes
1992	Dead On: Relentless II	Belinda Belos	
1992	Universal Soldier	Reporter at Hoover Dam	

=== Television ===
Year	Title	Role	Notes
1992	Cheers	Jessica	Episode: "The Magnificent Six"
1992	Hangin' with Mr. Cooper	Olivia Lee	Episode: "Miracle in Oaktown"
1994	Good Advice	Kelly	Episode: "Making Out Is Hard to Do"
1994	Sister, Sister	Danielle	Episode: "Wedding Bells & Box Boys"
1995	Dave's World	Leilani Jones-Wilmore	Episode: "Dis Who's Coming to Dinner?"
1995	Married... with Children	Reporter #1	Episode: "Ship Happens"
1995	Beverly Hills, 90210	District Attorney	Episodes: "Courting", "Breast Side Up"
1996	Almost Perfect	Officer Sanchez	Episode: "Mind Games"
2022	Pacific Rim: The Black	High Priestess	4 episodes

=== Video games ===
Year	Title	Role	Notes
1992	Gabriel Knight: Sins of the Fathers	Malia Gedde	
1994	Where on Earth Is Carmen Sandiego?	Additional Voices	
1995	Carmen Sandiego: Junior Detective Edition	Dee Jaye	
1995	The Dig	Cora Miles/Newsperson	
1997	The Curse of Monkey Island	The Voodoo Lady	
2000	Escape from Monkey Island	The Voodoo Lady	
2009	The Secret of Monkey Island: Special Edition	The Voodoo Lady / Carla the Swordmaster	
2010	Monkey Island 2: LeChuck's Revenge - Special Edition	The Voodoo Lady	
2022	Return to Monkey Island	Corina the Voodoo Lady / Carla	
2023	Sea of Thieves	Corina / Carla	
2023	Starfield	Orora Sabine	
2024	Rosewater	Loretta "Lola" Johnson, Sue Ellen Hawkins	

== Discography ==
- Little Shop of Horrors: Original Cast Album, 1982 Decca U.S. Label
- Grind: Original Broadway Cast, 1985 on the LP Record Label
