= Ron Richardson =

American actor and operatic baritone (1952–1995)

- Born: Ronald E. Richardson; January 27, 1952; Philadelphia, Pennsylvania, U.S.
- Died: April 5, 1995 (aged 43); Bronxville, New York, U.S.
- Education: University of the Arts
- Occupations: Actor; baritone vocalist
- Years active: 1970s–1990s
- Awards: Drama Desk Award for Outstanding Actor in a Musical (1985); Tony Award for Best Featured Actor in a Musical (1985)

Ronald E. Richardson (January 27, 1952 – April 5, 1995) was an American actor and operatic baritone. Richardson began his career in the mid-1970s appearing in regional theater and opera productions. He appeared in several Broadway musicals from 1978 to 1993, arguably best known for his Tony Award and Drama Desk Award-winning performance as "Jim" in the 1985 Broadway musical Big River.

== Early life ==
Richardson was born in Philadelphia, Pennsylvania. His father, William F. Richardson, worked in the meat-packing industry and his mother operated a beauty parlor in their home for more than 30 years. He had three siblings—brothers, Franklyn Richardson and Raymond Lloyd Richardson, and sister Vickilyn Richardson (now Vickilyn Reynolds). By the age of four, Richardson was singing at a neighborhood church. In high school, he performed in choirs and, eventually, dinner theater musicals. He also studied voice and music composition. After high school, Richardson entered the University of the Arts in Philadelphia, where he studied voice and played roles in classic musicals such as Show Boat, Camelot, and Man of La Mancha.

== Career ==
In 1977, Richardson played "Sportin' Life" in the Houston Grand Opera production of Porgy and Bess. His first role on Broadway was as the "Chief of Police" in the 1978 musical Timbuktu! Over the next several years, Richardson appeared in several regional theatre and opera productions and was in the 1983 national tour of Dreamgirls, but it was not until his award-winning performance as "Jim" in the 1985 Broadway musical Big River that he became widely known. Richardson's approach to the role of "Jim", a runaway slave, was heroic:

"When I play Jim," he told an interviewer from The New York Times, "I am playing my grandfather, and my mother swears I look like him as a young man. He was born a free man, but his father and mother were slaves. He was very strong, and very majestic."

After Big River closed in 1987, Richardson toured London, Japan, Moscow and St. Petersburg, Russia, in both concerts and staged productions. He also appeared at The American Place Theater in Leslie Lee's Ground People and starred as "Husky Miller" in the Old Vic revival of Carmen Jones.

Richardson also appeared in two more Broadway productions during the early 1990s: Oh, Kay! and The Boys Choir of Harlem and Friends.

== Death ==
On April 5, 1995, Richardson died from AIDS-related complications in Bronxville, New York at the age of 43. His funeral was held on April 8 in Mount Vernon, New York, where he had lived.
