= Quilters (musical) =

- Broadway Playbill
- Music: Barbara Damashek
- Lyrics: Barbara Damashek
- Book: Molly Newman; Barbara Damashek
- Basis: The Quilters:Women and Domestic Arts by Patricia Cooper and Norma Bradley Allen
- Productions: 1982 Denver; 1984 Broadway

Quilters is a musical with a book by Molly Newman and Barbara Damashek, and lyrics and music by Barbara Damashek. It is about the lives of American pioneer women based on the book The Quilters: Women and Domestic Art by Patricia Cooper and Norma Bradley Allen. The show was originally developed and produced by the Denver Center Theater Company, Brockman Seawell, executive producer. It had a brief run on Broadway in 1984.

== Productions ==
The Denver Center Theater Company produced the world premiere of Quilters in 1982. The musical then was produced at the Mark Taper Forum, Los Angeles, California, in December 1983; the Pittsburgh Public Theater from December 16, 1982 to January 30, 1983; and for 7 weeks at the Kennedy Center, Washington, DC, running from August 4, 1984 to September 1984. Damashek directed Quilters at the Edinburgh Festival (where it won a Fringe First Award), The Dublin Theatre Festival, The Pittsburgh Public Theater, and the Mark Taper Forum.

Quilters opened on Broadway at the Jack Lawrence Theatre on September 25, 1984 and closed on October 14, 1984 after 24 performances and 5 previews. It was directed by Barbara Damashek, with scenic design by Ursula Belden, costume design by Elizabeth Palmer, and lighting design by Allen Lee Hughes, and featured Lenka Peterson as Sarah. Despite an unfavorable review from Frank Rich in the New York Times and short run, the musical was nominated for six Tony Awards, including Best Musical.

The musical has been performed by numerous college and community theater groups across the United States. In 1986, the Frontier Follies (an outreach governed by the board of directors at the Frontier Village) in Jamestown, North Dakota presented the first outdoor theater production of Quilters with actress Mary Reinhardt performing the role of one of the multi-faceted "daughters." Composers Tania S. Wahl and Carrie Kraft were employed, respectively, as Director and Musical Director for the presentation. A full, stage-size quilt was constructed at the University of North Dakota for the outdoor production. Some in the conservative midwestern area questioned the inclusion of the herbal abortion allusion in the Frontier Follies production.

The Denver Center Theater Company again presented the musical May 22 through June 12, 2009. In 2009, the Missouri History Museum, Forest Park presented Quilters in one of the settings from the musical.

== Synopsis ==
In the American West, Sarah, a pioneer woman, and six women, who are called her daughters, face frontier life. Rather than a straightforward story, the musical is presented as a series of short tales and tableau matched with musical numbers, each presenting an aspect of frontier life or womanhood. The patches or blocks show "girlhood, marriage, childbirth, spinsterhood, twisters, fire, illness and death." The patches ultimately are put together to form one dramatic tableau.

== Songs ==
Act 1

- Pieces of Lives (first four lines from "The Quilt" by Dorothy MacFarlane)
- Rocky Road
- Little Babes (lyrics from "Our Homes and Their Adornments" by Almon C. Varney)
- Thread the Needle
- Cornelia
- Windmill
- Have You Been to Jesus by E.A. Hoffman
- Butterfly
- Pieces of Children's Lives
- Green, Green, Green
- Needle's Eye (chorus from the lyric of a traditional folk song)

Act II

- Quiltin' and Dreamin'
- Double Wedding Rings
- Every Log in My House (first line by Eleanor Pruitt Stewart)
- Never Grow Old by J.C. Moore
- Who Will Count the Stitches?
- Crosses and Losses part 1
- Crosses and Losses part 2
- Dandelion (lyrics by Clara J. Denton from the poem "Blooming in the Fall")
- Everything Has a Time
- Hands All Hands

== Response ==
In his New York Times review, Frank Rich wrote that "Quilters is a static melange of skits, monologues and songs unified by a theme rather than a sustained plot or characters."

The Washington Post reviewer wrote: "Quilters should probably be billed as a 'play with music,' lest you go expecting a big musical number to lift the proceedings a peg or two. Nothing is really big in this production. Its greatest strength is its unassuming honesty. It creates moods, more than it does drama, and its best moods are straightforward, like the people it is celebrating...The script is divided loosely into 16 sections or 'blocks,' dealing with such themes as childbirth, school days, windmills, courtship, weddings, country roads, religion and even log cabins. At the start of each section, one of the actresses unfolds a piece of quilting, which incorporates that particular concern into its design. Handsome and tidy pieces of work, they combine at the end to make one huge quilt, which is raised high, the flag of pioneer womanhood. It is a transcendent finale."

== Awards and nominations ==
=== Original Broadway production ===
| Year | Award | Category | Nominee | Result |
|---|---|---|---|---|
| 1985 | Tony Award | Best Musical | | Nominated |
| 1985 | Tony Award | Best Book of a Musical | Molly Newman and Barbara Damashek | Nominated |
| 1985 | Tony Award | Best Original Score | Barbara Damashek | Nominated |
| 1985 | Tony Award | Best Performance by a Featured Actress in a Musical | Evalyn Baron | Nominated |
| 1985 | Tony Award | Best Performance by a Featured Actress in a Musical | Lenka Peterson | Nominated |
| 1985 | Tony Award | Best Direction of a Musical | Barbara Damashek | Nominated |
