= Daniel Jenkins =

American actor (born 1963)

- Born: January 17, 1963 (age 63)
- Occupations: Actor; playwright; singer; songwriter
- Years active: 1985–present
- Spouse: Katherine Hiler (m. 1992)
- Children: 2
- Father: Ken Jenkins
- Relatives: Katharine Houghton (stepmother); Katharine Hepburn (step grand-aunt)

Daniel H. Jenkins (born January 17, 1963) is an American actor, best known for his stage work on Broadway, including his 1985 role as Huckleberry Finn in Roger Miller's Big River, for which he was nominated for a Tony Award.

== Personal life ==
Jenkins was born to actors Ken Jenkins and Joan Patchen. He acted in high school and plays in community theatre, before enrolling in the apprentice program at Actors Theatre of Louisville. In 1986, Jenkins and his father both appeared together on Broadway in the musical Big River.

== Career ==
Jenkins was nominated for a Tony Award in 1985 for his role as Huckleberry Finn in Big River, his Broadway debut. In 2003, he performed in the Tony nominated "Deaf West" signed revival of Big River, this time portraying Mark Twain and also performing as the voice for signed character Huckleberry Finn. Jenkins has had notable performances in several other Broadway musicals, including Mary Poppins, Billy Elliot, and Big The Musical.

On screen, Jenkins played O.C. in Robert Altman's film O.C. and Stiggs, shot in 1983 but not released until 1987. He again worked with Altman in his 1988 miniseries Tanner '88. On HBO he appeared on the cable channel's adventure film Florida Straits costarring alongside Raul Julia and Fred Ward. Other notable appearances include: The Caine Mutiny Court-Martial (TV Movie), Cradle Will Rock, The Good Wife, Veep, and Orange Is The New Black. Jenkins also appeared as the title character in the unaired 1997 Dilbert live action pitch pilot.

In October 2008, Jenkins, along with Robert Stanton, wrote and performed in the play Love Child at Primary Stages and then New World Stages in New York City.

In the 2019 film Martin Scorsese film The Irishman, Jenkins portrays CIA agent E. Howard Hunt.

== Stage work ==
- Big River – Huckleberry Finn
- Angels in America: Millennium Approaches – Prior Walter
- Angels in America: Perestroika – Prior Walter
- Big (musical) – Josh Baskin
- Wrong Mountain – Clifford Pike / Stevens
- Mary Poppins (musical) – George Banks
- Billy Elliot – Dad
- Golden Boy – Barker
- Oslo – Jan Egeland / Ron Pundak
- Kid Victory (Off-Broadway musical) – Dad / Joseph.
