= 36th Tony Awards =

1982 US theatrical awards ceremony

- Date: June 6, 1982
- Location: Imperial Theatre, New York City, New York
- Hosted by: Tony Randall
- Most wins: Dreamgirls (6)
- Most nominations: Dreamgirls (13)

Television/radio coverage
- Network: CBS

The 36th Annual Tony Awards was broadcast by CBS television on June 6, 1982, from the Imperial Theatre. The host was Tony Randall.

== Eligibility ==
Shows that opened on Broadway during the 1981–1982 season before May 10, 1982 are eligible.

Original plays

- Agnes of God
- Come Back to the 5 & Dime, Jimmy Dean, Jimmy Dean
- Crimes of the Heart
- The Curse of an Aching Heart
- The Dresser
- Duet for One
- Einstein and the Polar Bear
- Eminent Domain
- Grown Ups
- The Hothouse
- Kingdoms
- The Life and Adventures of Nicholas Nickleby
- Mass Appeal
- "Master Harold"...and the Boys
- Ned and Jack
- Scenes and Revelations
- Solomon's Child
- Special Occasions
- The Supporting Cast
- A Talent for Murder
- Wally's Cafe
- The West Side Waltz
- The World of Sholom Aleichem

Original musicals

- Dreamgirls
- The First
- Is There Life After High School?
- Joseph and the Amazing Technicolor Dreamcoat
- The Little Prince and the Aviator
- Marlowe
- Merrily We Roll Along
- Oh, Brother!
- Nine
- Pump Boys and Dinettes
- Waltz of the Stork

Play revivals

- Candida
- Macbeth
- Medea
- Othello
- A Taste of Honey

Musical revivals

- Fiddler on the Roof
- Little Johnny Jones
- Little Me
- My Fair Lady
- This Was Burlesque

== The ceremony ==
Presenters: Lucie Arnaz, Milton Berle, Victor Borge, Pam Dawber, Lillian Gish, Marvin Hamlisch, Lena Horne, Beth Howland, Robert Goulet, James Earl Jones, Swoosie Kurtz, Michele Lee, Hal Linden, Ann Miller, Robert Preston, Jason Robards, Ginger Rogers, Gary Sandy, Ben Vereen.

Some of Broadway's theatres were being demolished (the Morosco, Helen Hayes and Bijou Theatres) thus the theme was to celebrate a great Broadway theatre, the Imperial. "The Imperial Medley" featured songs from Rose Marie; Oh, Kay!; Jubilee; Leave It to Me; On Your Toes; Between the Devil; Annie Get Your Gun; Miss Liberty; Call Me Madam; The Most Happy Fella; Fiddler on the Roof; The New Moon; Silk Stockings; Wish You Were Here; The Laugh Parade; Carnival; They're Playing Our Song; Oliver!; and Pippin.

Musicals represented:

- Dreamgirls ("It's All Over/And I Am Telling You I'm Not Going" - Jennifer Holliday and Company);
- Joseph and the Amazing Technicolor Dreamcoat ("Jacob and Sons"/"One More Angel"/"Potiphar"/"Those Canaan Days"/"Benjamin Calypso"/"Go Go Joseph"/"Pharaoh Story"/"Song of the King"/"Pharaoh Story"/"Any Dream Will Do"/"Joseph's Coat" - Company);
- Nine ("Be Italian" - Kathi Moss and Company);
- Pump Boys and Dinettes ("Vacation"/"No Holds Barred"/"Highway 57" - Company).

== Winners and nominees ==
Winners are in bold

Best Play	Best Musical
**The Life and Adventures of Nicholas Nickleby – David Edgar**; Crimes of the Heart – Beth Henley; The Dresser – Ronald Harwood; "Master Harold"...and the Boys – Athol Fugard	**Nine**; Dreamgirls; Joseph and the Amazing Technicolor Dreamcoat; Pump Boys and Dinettes
Best Revival	Best Book of a Musical
**Othello**; A Taste of Honey; Medea; My Fair Lady	**Tom Eyen – Dreamgirls**; Tim Rice – Joseph and the Amazing Technicolor Dreamcoat; Arthur Kopit – Nine; Joel Siegel and Martin Charnin – The First
Best Performance by a Leading Actor in a Play	Best Performance by a Leading Actress in a Play
**Roger Rees – The Life and Adventures of Nicholas Nickleby as Nicholas Nickleby**; Tom Courtenay – The Dresser as Norman; Milo O'Shea – Mass Appeal as Father Tim Farley; Christopher Plummer – Othello as Iago	**Zoe Caldwell – Medea as Medea**; Katharine Hepburn – The West Side Waltz as Margaret Mary Elderdice; Geraldine Page – Agnes of God as Mother Miriam Ruth; Amanda Plummer – A Taste of Honey as Josephine
Best Performance by a Leading Actor in a Musical	Best Performance by a Leading Actress in a Musical
**Ben Harney – Dreamgirls as Curtis Taylor Jr.**; Herschel Bernardi – Fiddler on the Roof as Tevye; Victor Garber – Little Me as Various Characters; Raúl Juliá – Nine as Guido Contini	**Jennifer Holliday – Dreamgirls as Effie White**; Lisa Mordente – Marlowe as Emelia Bossano; Mary Gordon Murray – Little Me as Belle Poitrine; Sheryl Lee Ralph – Dreamgirls as Deena Jones
Best Performance by a Featured Actor in a Play	Best Performance by a Featured Actress in a Play
**Zakes Mokae – "Master Harold"...and the Boys as Sam**; Richard Kavanaugh – The Hothouse as Gibbs; Edward Petherbridge – The Life and Adventures of Nicholas Nickleby as Newman Noggs; David Threlfall – The Life and Adventures of Nicholas Nickleby as Smike	**Amanda Plummer – Agnes of God as Agnes**; Judith Anderson – Medea as Nurse; Mia Dillon – Crimes of the Heart as Babe Botrelle; Mary Beth Hurt – Crimes of the Heart as Meg MaGrath
Best Performance by a Featured Actor in a Musical	Best Performance by a Featured Actress in a Musical
**Cleavant Derricks – Dreamgirls as James "Thunder" Early**; Obba Babatundé – Dreamgirls as C.C. White; David Alan Grier – The First as Jackie Robinson; Bill Hutton – Joseph and the Amazing Technicolor Dreamcoat as Joseph	**Liliane Montevecchi – Nine as Liliane La Fleur**; Karen Akers – Nine as Luisa Contini; Laurie Beechman – Joseph and the Amazing Technicolor Dreamcoat as Narrator; Anita Morris – Nine as Carla Albanese
Best Original Score (Music and/or Lyrics) Written for the Theatre	Best Choreography
**Nine – Maury Yeston (music and lyrics)**; Dreamgirls – Henry Krieger (music) and Tom Eyen (lyrics); Joseph and the Amazing Technicolor Dreamcoat – Andrew Lloyd Webber (music) and Tim Rice (lyrics); Merrily We Roll Along – Stephen Sondheim (music and lyrics)	**Michael Bennett and Michael Peters – Dreamgirls**; Peter Gennaro – Little Me; Tony Tanner – Joseph and the Amazing Technicolor Dreamcoat; Tommy Tune – Nine
Best Direction of a Play	Best Direction of a Musical
**Trevor Nunn and John Caird – The Life and Adventures of Nicholas Nickleby**; Melvin Bernhardt – Crimes of the Heart; Geraldine Fitzgerald – Mass Appeal; Athol Fugard – "Master Harold"...and the Boys	**Tommy Tune – Nine**; Michael Bennett – Dreamgirls; Martin Charnin – The First; Tony Tanner – Joseph and the Amazing Technicolor Dreamcoat
Best Scenic Design	Best Costume Design
**John Napier and Dermot Hayes – The Life and Adventures of Nicholas Nickleby**; Ben Edwards – Medea; Lawrence Miller – Nine; Robin Wagner – Dreamgirls	**William Ivey Long – Nine**; Theoni V. Aldredge – Dreamgirls; Jane Greenwood – Medea; John Napier – The Life and Adventures of Nicholas Nickleby
Best Lighting Design
**Tharon Musser – Dreamgirls**; Martin Aronstein – Medea; David Hersey – The Life and Adventures of Nicholas Nickleby; Marcia Madeira – Nine

== Special awards ==
- Special Awards —The Actors' Fund of America
- Theatre Award '82

Warner Communications
Radio City Music Hall

- Regional Theatre Award — The Guthrie Theatre, Minneapolis, Minnesota

=== Multiple nominations and awards ===
These productions had multiple nominations:

- 13 nominations: Dreamgirls
- 12 nominations: Nine
- 8 nominations: The Life and Adventures of Nicholas Nickleby
- 7 nominations: Joseph and the Amazing Technicolor Dreamcoat
- 6 nominations: Medea
- 4 nominations: Crimes of the Heart
- 3 nominations: The First, Little Me and "Master Harold"...and the Boys
- 2 nominations: Agnes of God, The Dresser, Mass Appeal, Othello and A Taste of Honey

The following productions received multiple awards.

- 6 wins: Dreamgirls
- 5 wins: Nine
- 4 wins: The Life and Adventures of Nicholas Nickleby

== See also ==
- Drama Desk Awards
- 1982 Laurence Olivier Awards – equivalent awards for West End theatre productions
- Obie Award
- New York Drama Critics' Circle
- Theatre World Award
- Lucille Lortel Awards
