= Chita Rivera: The Dancer's Life =

Broadway musical

- Theatrical poster
- Music: Stephen Flaherty and others
- Lyrics: Lynn Ahrens and others
- Book: Terrence McNally
- Productions: 2005 San Diego; 2005 Broadway; 2006 US Tour

Chita Rivera: The Dancer's Life is a musical revue based on the life of Chita Rivera, with a book by Terrence McNally, original songs by Stephen Flaherty and Lynn Ahrens, and additional songs from various other composers' catalogs. It earned Rivera her ninth Tony Award nomination (for Best Actress in a Musical).

== History ==
Chita Rivera: The Dancer's Life was conceived by Chita Rivera in 2003, while she appeared in the musical Nine on Broadway. Since Rivera's next project, the Public Theater production of The Visit, had been canceled, Rivera approached that show's book writer, Terrence McNally, with the idea of a musical based upon her life. Rivera's conception was that the musical would open with her dancing to her father's music and then progress through the various stages of her career. McNally and Rivera officially announced in November 2003 that they were working on the show, and that a workshop production would be held in summer of 2004 at the Tampa Bay Performing Arts Center in Florida. Marty Bell and Graciela Daniele were lined up as producer and director, respectively, of the workshop.

In 2005, Rivera debuted And Now I Sing, a one-woman cabaret at Feinstein's at the Regency in New York City, which ran from February 22 through March 12. Though the show and its venue were both intimate, the reviews were strong. Stephen Holden, in his review for The New York Times, wrote that "her program finds a comfortable mix of sass and sentiment" and noted that in several songs ("Where Am I Going?" from Sweet Charity, for example), she "captures exactly the right tone of dazed determination." The act also marked the debut of some of the anecdotes and stage patter that would be more fully fleshed out by McNally for the Broadway revue. Later that year, The Denver Center for the Performing Arts announced that another one-woman show, Chita Rivera Dances Through Life, would debut at that theater and feature a book by McNally and direction and choreography by Daniele. However, funding didn't materialize, and the booking was canceled.

It was announced in August 2005 that the revue would have a pre-Broadway production at the Old Globe Theatre in San Diego. The revue, now retitled Chita Rivera: The Dancer's Life opened on September 10, 2005, and ran until October 23. An engagement on Broadway at the Gerald Schoenfeld Theatre was confirmed for November 2005 in previews. Matthew White and Frank Webb were subsequently asked to design Rivera's dressing room. The Broadway production of Chita Rivera: The Dancer's Life began its open-ended run with a series of previews in November, and officially opened on December 11, 2005, to mixed reviews. The song selection and other aspects of the production were tweaked throughout the run: For example, an opening prologue featuring the dancers warming up before the show was dropped shortly after the show opened, and the number "America" was only added to the show in January 2006. More revisions were required during Rivera's special "birthday week" performances from January 24 through 26, during which her former Bye Bye Birdie co-star Dick Van Dyke joined her on stage. The show closed on February 19, 2006, after 20 previews and 72 performances. Rivera then immediately embarked on a national tour, in which many numbers from the Broadway production were cut, and the character of "Young Chita" was eliminated.

== Synopsis ==
The show is divided into thematic sections during which "Chita" (Chita Rivera) shares anecdotes from her life. Members of the ensemble play the part of various figures in her life.

Act I

Chita remembers her father, a professional saxophonist who died when she was seven years old, playing "Perfidia" for her. "Little Chita" (played by a child) picks up the rhythm in this music in a dance which moves from the scene to the front of a large screen. Suddenly, the shadow of Chita appears behind her. The screen rises, revealing Chita, who continues the dance. (This sequence was altered for the touring version, which eliminated the "Little Chita" role.)

After this introduction, Chita is shown in 2002 at the White House, where she is to be the first Latina-American to receive the Kennedy Center Honor. She begins to reminisce ("The Secret O' Life") and decides that "the secret of life is enjoying the passage of time."

The next scene shows life at the Del Rivero family table in Washington, D.C., when Chita was a young child. Various family members react to Chita's "Dancing on the Kitchen Table," and, when the table breaks, her parents decide to send Chita to dance class. This sequence transitions into one showing Chita at the barre in dance class, where she takes ballet lessons three times a week under the tutelage of her mentor, Doris W. Jones. Chita shares that Jones took her to New York City at age 17 to audition for George Balanchine, who bandages Chita's injury personally when he notices her bleeding through her toe shoe.

After winning a scholarship to the School of American Ballet, Chita accompanies a friend to an audition for a tour of Call Me Madam, starring Elaine Stritch. Chita is hired, ending her career in classical ballet. As a young "gypsy," Chita talks about her aspiration to get a "crossover" – a featured bit of dancing or business to do during a scenery change ("Something to Dance About"). Though Chita doesn't get a crossover in Call Me Madam, she does get lessons in stage presence from Stritch, who tells her to "make them hear you!" Still, Chita yearns for fame ("I'm Available").

In her first Broadway show, Seventh Heaven, she plays a prostitute ("Camille, Colette, Fifi"). Later, she appears in The Shoestring Review with Bea Arthur. Singing "Garbage", Chita reminisces about working with Arthur, who originally sang the number while Chita jumped in and out of a garbage bag – she jokes that the audience will have to "[leave] the jumping to our imaginations." The number segues into the title song of Can-Can, where Chita is now a member of the chorus. Later, she joins the cast of Mr. Wonderful ("Mr. Wonderful"), and she dates the young star, Sammy Davis Jr.

Chita recreates the audition that earned her the role of "Anita" in West Side Story, her first lead. When the show's composer, Leonard Bernstein, finds Chita'a audition piece, "My Man's Gone Now," laughable, he gives her "A Boy Like That" to sing. After several false starts, she lands the number and the role. Modern-day Chita then performs "America" from the show and tells of learning from West Side Story director/choreographer Jerome Robbins ("Jerry gave me detail, style, and substance") and Peter Gennaro (the choreographer of material for the Sharks gang in the show). She then performs "The Dance at the Gym" and "Somewhere" with the ensemble.

A sequence devoted to Chita's various co-stars over the years, who all appear in silhouette, follows. In Bye Bye Birdie there was Dick Van Dyke (for four performances, Van Dyke joined Rivera on stage) ("Put On A Happy Face" and "Rosie"). In The Rink Chita worked with Liza Minnelli ("Don't Ah Ma Me"). Antonio Banderas was her co-star in Nine, and Donald O'Connor co-starred with her in Bring Back Birdie. This segment ends with Chita's tribute to Gwen Verdon – "as close as [she] will ever come to the magic of Charlie Chaplin" ("Hey, Big Spender"). In the final section of Act I, Chita sings and dances "Nowadays" from Chicago, alongside an empty spotlight representing the deceased Verdon. Chita turns to that spotlight when she sings, "but nothing stays."

Act II

Act II begins with a dance audition, during which Puerto Rican Chita is rejected because she is "not Latin enough." An overhead mirror provides a view from above, and, proving she is "Latin enough," Chita dances several tangos opposite a male dancer ("Adios Niñino", "Detresse", and "Calambre"). This leads to further reminiscing about her great romances ("More Than You Know"). First, her ex-husband, Tony Mordente, father of Chita's daughter Lisa. Then, the restaurateur Joe Allen, whom she nearly married. "To Tony, Tom, Joe, and Greg. And others... you know who you are!"

Next, Chita pays tribute to the choreographers in her life – Robbins, Gennaro, Jack Cole, and Bob Fosse – as she and the ensemble demonstrate their individual styles. Then, Chita talks about some of her setbacks, including an automobile accident in which she broke her leg; losing the role of Anita to Rita Moreno in the film adaptation of West Side Story; and Fosse's death from a heart attack. But, she considers herself lucky through it all – especially due to her collaborations with John Kander and Fred Ebb.

The song "A Woman the World Has Never Seen" wraps around a selection of Chita's songs from her three Kander and Ebb roles: "Class" from Chicago, "Chief Cook and Bottle Washer" from The Rink, and "Kiss of the Spider Woman" and "Where You Are" from Kiss of the Spider Woman. This brings Chita back to where she started – the White House, where she concludes with her trademark number, "All That Jazz" (from Chicago), with "Little Chita" shadowing her again.

== Productions ==
The musical first opened at the Old Globe Theatre in San Diego, where it ran from September 10 to October 23, 2005. It then transferred to the Gerald Schoenfeld Theatre on Broadway, opening in previews on November 23, 2005, officially on December 11. The show closed after 72 performances and 20 previews. The play's Executive Producers were Marty Bell and Aldo Scrofani (the show credits 19 producers and associates). It was directed and choreographed by Graciela Daniele, with reproductions of original choreography by Jerome Robbins and Bob Fosse reconstructed by Alan Johnson and Tony Stevens, respectively. Mark Hummel was musical director and arranger, as well as the orchestra's conductor, while orchestrations were provided by Danny Troob. Loy Arcenas (sets), Toni-Leslie James (costumes), and Jules Fisher and Peggy Eisenhauer (lighting) comprised the show's design team.

After the show's closing on Broadway, Rivera toured throughout the United States during 2006 and 2007. Major changes were made for the touring version of the show: the numbers "Can-Can", "Don't 'Ah Ma' Me", and "Where You Are" were all dropped, as were the Act II-opening Tango sequence and the character of "Little Chita/Lisa." Of the Broadway cast, only Richard Amaro, Lloyd Culbreath, and Richard Montoya went on tour with Rivera. Notably, however, Rivera's daughter Lisa Mordente joined the tour as dance captain and female swing. Cities on the tour included Philadelphia, Cleveland, and Boston. The tour concluded on June 10, 2007, in Norfolk, Virginia.

After the ending of the tour, Rivera performed a solo cabaret act at the New York cabaret Feinstein's at Loews Regency in 2007 and has continued to perform variations at Feinstein's/54 Below and other venues over the years. Although this is not a recreation of The Dancer's Life, it includes most of the songs and anecdotes featured in the show (including the Ahrens & Flaherty original songs).

== Cast ==
In addition to Chita Rivera (playing herself), the original Broadway cast featured Liana Ortiz as both the young Rivera and as Rivera's daughter, Lisa Mordente. The ensemble included Richard Amaro, Lloyd Culbreath, Malinda Farrington, Edgard Gallardo, Deidre Goodwin, Richard Montoya, Lainie Sakakura, Alex Sanchez, and Allyson Tucker. In four performances between January 24, 2006, and January 26, 2006, Rivera was joined by her Bye Bye Birdie co-star, Dick Van Dyke, in celebration of Rivera's birthday.

== Song list ==
Chita Rivera: The Dancer's Life is a revue: the work of numerous composers and lyricists is represented.

Act I

- Perfidia (Music by Alberto Domínguez/Lyrics by Milton Leeds)
- Secret O' Life (Music and Lyrics by James Taylor)
- Dancing on the Kitchen Table (Music by Stephen Flaherty/Lyrics by Lynn Ahrens)
- Something to Dance About (from Call Me Madam, Music and Lyrics by Irving Berlin)
- I'm Available (from Mr. Wonderful, Music and Lyrics by Lawrence Holofcener and Jerry Bock)
- Camille, Colette, Fifi (from Seventh Heaven, Music by Victor Young/Lyrics by Stella Unger)
- Garbage (from Shoestring Review, Music and Lyrics by Sheldon Harnick)
- Can-Can (from Can-Can, Music and Lyrics by Cole Porter)
- Mr. Wonderful (from Mr. Wonderful, Music and Lyrics by Holofcener and Bock)
- A Boy Like That (from West Side Story, Music by Leonard Bernstein/Lyrics by Stephen Sondheim)
- America (from West Side Story, Music by Bernstein/Lyrics by Sondheim)
- Dance at the Gym (Mambo) (from West Side Story, Music by Bernstein/Lyrics by Sondheim)
- Somewhere (from West Side Story, Music by Bernstein/Lyrics by Sondheim)
- Put on a Happy Face (from Bye Bye Birdie, Music by Charles Strouse/Lyrics by Lee Adams)
- Rosie (from Bye Bye Birdie, Music by Strouse/Lyrics by Adams)
- Don't 'Ah Ma' Me (from The Rink, Music by John Kander/Lyrics by Fred Ebb)
- Big Spender (from Sweet Charity, Music by Cy Coleman/ Lyrics by Dorothy Fields)
- Nowadays (from Chicago, Music by Kander/Lyrics by Ebb)

Act II

- Adios Niñino, Detresse, Calambre (Tangos)(Music by Ástor Piazzolla)
- More Than You Know (Music by Vincent Youmans/Lyrics by Edward Eliscu and Billy Rose)
- A Woman the World Has Never Seen (Music by Flaherty/Lyrics by Ahrens)
- Class (from Chicago, Music by Kander/Lyrics by Ebb)
- Chief Cook & Bottlewasher (from The Rink, Music by Kander/Lyrics by Ebb)
- Kiss of the Spider Woman (from Kiss of the Spider Woman, Music by Kander/Lyrics by Ebb)
- Where You Are (from Kiss of the Spider Woman, Music by Kander/Lyrics by Ebb)
- All That Jazz (from Chicago, Music by Kander/Lyrics by Ebb)

== Response ==
=== Award nominations ===
The Broadway production received one Tony Award nomination for Best Actress in a Musical for Chita Rivera, Rivera's ninth. Rivera lost to LaChanze of The Color Purple.

=== Critical reception ===
While the show won a great deal of praise for its 72-year-old star's performance, the "non-Chita" aspects of the show received little critical acclaim. In his review for TalkinBroadway.com, Matthew Murray referred to the show as a "stretch-mark-pocked retrospective," and called Terrence McNally's libretto "scattered" and Graciela Daniele's direction "busy but uninspired," while calling Rivera "terrific." David Rooney of Variety called the show "never less than enjoyable but too rarely exhilarating." He went on to say that McNally "[comes] off like a bumbling novice at theatricalizing a showbiz legend's life." Ben Brantley of The New York Times said "the production elements often dim rather than enhance Ms. Rivera's natural incandescence. Never entirely, though. Which means that The Dancer's Life remains a must-have ticket for aficionados of the American musical."
