= Mordente =

Mordente is a surname. Notable people with the surname include:

- Fabrizio Mordente (1532 – c. 1608), Italian mathematician
- Lisa Mordente (born 1958), American actress, singer and dancer
- Marco Mordente (born 1979), Italian basketball player
- Tony Mordente (1935 - 2024), American dancer, choreographer, actor and television director
