= Carmen Zapata =

American actress (1927–2014)

- Zapata in Love, American Style, 1973
- Born: Carmen Margarita Zapata; July 15, 1927; New York City, New York, U.S.
- Died: January 5, 2014 (aged 86); Los Angeles, California, U.S.
- Occupation: Actress
- Years active: 1946–2002
- Spouse: Ron Friedman (m. 1957; div. 1963)

Carmen Margarita Zapata (July 15, 1927 – January 5, 2014) often referred to as "The First Lady of the Hispanic Theater" was an American actress best known for her role in the PBS bilingual children's program Villa Alegre. Zapata was also the co-founder and director of the Bilingual Foundation of the Arts in Los Angeles. Zapata took an active part in the Chicano movement of the 1960s and 1970s.

== Early life ==
Zapata was born in New York City to Julio Zapata, a Mexican immigrant, and Ramona Roca, an Argentine immigrant.

== Acting career ==
Zapata made her Broadway debut in the chorus of Oklahoma! in 1946. She appeared in over three hundred movies and shows, including Batman: The Animated Series, Married... with Children, Sister Act, and she was Carmen Castillo in Santa Barbara. One of her longest-running roles was on the bilingual children's program Villa Alegre, where for nine years she played the lead character, "Doña Luz."

In 1972, Zapata co-founded the Screen Actors Guild Ethnic Minority Committee with actors Ricardo Montalbán, Edith Diaz, and Henry Darrow. She was also one of the original members of the Hispanic actors organization "Nosotros," which was begun by Ricardo Montalbán. In 1973, she co-founded the Bilingual Foundation of the Arts (BFA) with Cuban-born actress, playwright, and director Margarita Galban and Argentine-born award-winning set designer Estela Scarlata.

In 1976, Zapata joined Rodolfo Hoyos, Jr., in starring roles in the 12-episode ABC situation comedy summer replacement series Viva Valdez, about a Mexican-American family living in East Los Angeles, California.

In 1986, she and her writing partner, Michael Dewell, published translations for Federico García Lorca's dramatic trilogy. The title was published by Bantam Books and was part of her effort to bring Spanish language literature to English speakers.

== Awards ==
In 1983, Zapata was honored with the Humanitarian Crystal Award from Women in Film. Zapata was also honored with a Hispanic Heritage Lifetime Achievement Award in 1997 for her career trajectory in the arts and for her work with the BFA.

Zapata was nominated for an Emmy twice in her career, once as Best Supporting Actress for her role in a segment of Medical Center and once for her role in the film Carola.

In 1981, Zapata was part of a group of greater Los Angeles women honored by the Young Women's Christian Association with the Silver Achievement Award.

In 1983, Zapata was given the Ruben Salazar Award by the Mexican American Legal Defense and Education Fund (MALDEF).

In 1985, Zapata was named Woman of the Year by the Hispanic Women's Council.

In 1986, Zapata was the recipient of the Best Translation Award from the journal Dramalogue.

Granted an honorary doctorate in human services from Sierra University.

In 1991, she was among nine Californian artists, arts organizations, and patrons to receive the Governor's Award for the Arts.

In 1999, Zapata was knighted by His Majesty Juan Carlos I, King of Spain and received El Lazo de Dama del Orden del Mérito Civil, the Civil Order of Merit.

In 2003, Zapata received a star on the Hollywood Walk of Fame.

== Philanthropy ==
Throughout her life, Zapata was involved in various charitable events including sitting on the board of the United Way, the Mexican American Opportunity Foundation, the KCET Community Advisory Board, the Boy Scouts of America, the National Conference of Christians and Jews, the National Repertory Theatre Foundation, and member of the City of Los Angeles Mayor's Committee on the Arts, the California Arts Council's Ethnic Advisory Minority Panel, and many other organizations. She has also served as a panel member of the Expansion Arts Program of the National Endowment for the Arts, the Los Angeles Special Olympics Events Committee, and other programs.

== Death ==
Zapata died in Los Angeles, California on January 5, 2014, from heart disease, aged 86.

== Filmography ==
Year	Title	Role	Notes
1969	Hail, Hero!	Juana	
1972	Adam-12	Mrs. Cipeano	S4, E17 "The Parol Violator"
1972	Portnoy's Complaint	Mrs. Harero	Uncredited
1973	Bad Charleston Charlie	Lottie	
1973	Toke		
1973	Carola	Mireille	TV film
1974	The Last Porno Flick	Mama Theresa	
1974	W	Betty	
1975	Boss Nigger	Margarita	
1975	Kolchak: The Night Stalker	Spanish Woman	S1E16
1976	I Will, I Will... for Now	Maria	
1977	Billy Jack Goes to Washington	Minor Role	Uncredited
1977	Telefon	Nurse	
1977	John Hus	Mother of John Hus	
1977	Emergency!	Car Accident Victim	S6E24 “All Night Long”
1978	Rabbit Test	Madam Nundi	
1979	The New Adventures of Wonder Woman	The Prime Minister	S3E17 "The Richest Man in the World"
1979	Boulevard Nights	Mrs. Landeros	
1980	How to Beat the High Co$t of Living	Mama	Uncredited
1980	There Goes the Bride	Mrs. Ramirez	
1984	Vultures	Elena Garcia-Lopez	
1986	The Education of Allison Tate	Teresa Aleman	
1992	Sister Act	Sister Mary Emmanuel	
1993	Point of No Return	Judge	
1993	Sister Act 2: Back in the Habit	Sister Mary Emmanuel	
1994	Por la Vida: Street Vending & the Criminalization of Latinos	Narrator	Voice
1994	Skins	Roses	
1996	The Disappearance of Garcia Lorca	Lorca's Mother	
1998	Dr. Quinn, Medicine Woman	Doña Verano	Episode 6.17 "Happily Ever After"
2000	The Egg Plant Lady	Rosa Vecino	
2001	The Sleepy Time Gal	Anna	

== See also ==
- List of stars on the Hollywood Walk of Fame
- Bilingual Foundation of the Arts
