= Viva Valdez =

- Title card
- Genre: Sitcom
- Created by: Stan Jacobson; Bernard Rothman; Jack Wohl
- Based on: The Plouffe Family by Roger Lemelin
- Developed by: Michael Elias; Frank Shaw
- Directed by: Alan Rafkin
- Starring: Carmen Zapata; Rodolfo Hoyos; James Victor; Nelson D. Cuevas; Lisa Mordente; Claudio Martinez; Jorge Cervera, Jr.
- Composers: Julius Wechter; Shorty Rogers
- Country of origin: United States
- Original language: English
- No. of seasons: 1
- No. of episodes: 12

Production
- Executive producers: Bernard Rothman; Jack Wohl; Stan Jacobson
- Running time: 30 minutes
- Production companies: Rothman/Wohl Productions; Stan Jacobson Productions; Columbia Pictures Television

Original release
- Network: ABC
- Release: May 31 – September 6, 1976

Viva Valdez is an American sitcom starring Carmen Zapata and Rodolfo Hoyos that aired on ABC from May 31 to September 6, 1976.

== Cast ==
- Carmen Zapata as Sophia Valdez
- Rodolfo Hoyos Jr. as Luis Valdez
- James Victor as Victor Valdez
- Nelson D. Cuevas as Ernesto Valdez
- Lisa Mordente as Connie Valdez
- Claudio Martinez as Pepe Valdez
- Jorge Cervera, Jr. as Jerry Ramirez

== Synopsis ==
The Valdezes are a closeknit Mexican-American family living in East Los Angeles, California. The parents, Luis and Sophia, try to maintain traditional values, while their four children – Victor, Ernesto, Connie, and Pepe – are more attuned to the latest trends in mid-1970s American life. Luis runs a plumbing business with Victor, Ernesto is an artistic young man who is in training to work for the telephone company, Connie is an irrepressible teenager, and Pepe is a 12-year-old baseball fanatic. Jerry Ramirez is a cousin who has recently arrived in the United States and has trouble with the English language. Inez is Connie's friend.

== Production ==
Bernard Rothman, Stan Jacobson, and Jack Wohl created Viva Valdez and were its executive producers. Alan Rafkin directed all twelve episodes. Earl Barret wrote for the show.

== Broadcast history ==
Viva Valdez premiered on May 31, 1976, as a summer replacement series and aired on Monday nights at 8:00 p.m. through July 5, 1976. After a four-week hiatus, it returned to the same time slot on August 2, 1976. Its twelfth and final episode aired on September 6, 1976.

== Episodes ==
No.	Title	Directed by	Written by	Original release date
1	"Father and Son Day"	Unknown	Unknown	May 31, 1976
Pepe concludes that his birth was neither expected nor wanted.
2	"My Fair Jerry"	Alan Rafkin	Earl Barrett	June 7, 1976
Sophia decides to become a matchmaker for cousin Jerry, and the Valdez family becomes obsessed with finding him a girlfriend.
3	"The Nurse's Pipes"	Unknown	Unknown	June 14, 1976
While Luis and Victor perform a plumbing repair job at the home of a divorced nurse named Gladys Gettys, Gladys makes romantic overtures to Luis. After they leave Gladys's home, Luis guiltily confides to Victor that he was attracted to Gladys. He does not tell Sophia, but he does decide to take Sophia out to dinner to ease his conscience. As they are leaving for dinner, Gladys calls about a plumbing emergency and the unsuspecting Sophia tells her that Luis will be right over – causing Luis to panic and insist that he cannot go unless Victor comes with him. Doris Roberts guest-stars as Gladys.
4	"Nervous Break-Up"	Alan Rafkin	Howard Albrecht & Sol Weinstein	June 21, 1976
Jerry begins sleepwalking – keeping the Valdez family up all night – and acting strangely, and the Valdezes try to figure out why.
5	"Pilot"	Alan Rafkin	Michael Elias & Frank Shaw	July 5, 1976
Victor demands that his father take him on as a partner in the plumbing business.
6	"Mama Doesn't"	Alan Rafkin	Phil Mishkin and Julie Russo	August 2, 1976
Sophia refuses to do housework until Luis permits her to use the house for a women's liberation meeting. Teresa Hoyos guest-stars.
7	"Pick Up"	Unknown	Unknown	August 9, 1976
Victor accuses Jerry's girlfriend of cheating.
8	"Papa's Legacy"	Unknown	Unknown	August 18, 1976
A close friend dies, panicking Luis into composing his own will.
9	"Mama Sees a Thief"	Unknown	Unknown	August 18, 1976
Victor discovers that he has been unknowingly fencing stolen goods.
10	"Brothers' Rivalry"	Alan Rafkin	Phil Mishkin & Julie Russo	August 23, 1976
Ernesto and Victor become hotheaded rivals for the favor of an attractive young woman. Maria Grimm guest-stars.
11	"Weekend"	Unknown	Unknown	August 30, 1976
The Valdez children give their parents a chance at a second honeymoon. David L. Lander guest-stars.
12	"The Apprentice"	Alan Rafkin	Bernard M. Kahn	September 6, 1976
Luis hires the bumbling Jerry as an apprentice. Dick Bakalyan guest-stars.
