= Shelly Burch =

American actress and singer

- Born: Tucson, Arizona, U.S.
- Occupations: Actress, singer

Shelly Burch is an American actress and singer known to television audiences for her role as Delilah Ralston on ABC's daytime soap opera One Life to Live, a role she played for eight years.

== Life and career ==
Born in Tucson, Arizona, she began performing as a teenager in community and regional musicals, ultimately moving to Washington, D.C., with her family when her father Dean Burch entered Republican party politics in the 1964 White House run for the Presidency by Barry Goldwater. She continued working in the D.C. area and eventually entered Carnegie Mellon University, where she stayed until a move to New York in the 70's. Shelly was cast in her first Broadway show six months after her arrival. She played one of Sammy Davis Jr.'s daughters in the revival of Stop the World – I Want to Get Off, which began its run in California and came to Lincoln Center, New York. In 1979, after several cabaret appearances, she snagged the role of Star-To-Be in Annie on Broadway, and also played the role of Lily St. Regis. In 1980, Tommy Tune cast her in his original Broadway production of Nine. She played the role of Claudia and introduced Maury Yeston's "Unusual Way". The role earned her kudos, including one from Frank Rich (then the drama critic for The New York Times), in which he called her "a Modigliani goddess with another strong voice and an almost otherworldly presence". She also garnered a Drama Desk nomination for the role. She stayed with Nine until she was tapped to originate the role of the devilish Delilah Ralston on ABC-TV's long-running soap opera One Life to Live. She stayed on the show for eight years, and at the same time honed her cabaret skills. In 1989, after having left Llanview (where One Life took place), she created the role of Julie for the Paper Mill Playhouse's production of Show Boat, which subsequently was filmed by PBS for Great Performances.

In 1990, she moved to Florida, got married and had three children. During her Florida residency, she continued to perform regionally and sang in numerous churches and at the Holy Land. She also worked extensively at Disneyland and continued her cabaret and night club career. She also performed at diverse locations such as the Republican National Convention and RFK Stadium, stirring audiences with her version of "The Star Spangled Banner". In 2003, after roles such as Patsy Cline in "An Evening With..." and Aldonza in Man of La Mancha, she called her old friend and Annie director Martin Charnin to come and create a new night club act for her. He did. The act played in Orlando, Washington, D.C., and eventually in 2009 came to the Metropolitan Room in New York City. In 2004, family-in-hand, she moved to the Pacific Northwest and became a regular in the Seattle and environs theater scene. In 2006, she and Mr. Charnin married and they continued working together in the Pacific Northwest, until they returned to the East Coast in July 2012. Shelly has done several revues at The Emelin Theatre in Mamaroneck, New York and several one-woman shows in New York City at 54 Below and The Metropolitan Room all directed by Mr. Charnin. She is currently working on a one-woman entertainment entitled Incurably Romantic featuring the music and lyrics of Mr. Charnin opening in December 2019.

=== Film and television ===
- Oy Vey! My Son is Gay (2010) as Teresa, direction by Evgany Afineevsky
- Norman as Diane, direction by Jonathan Segal
- Her Meds as Aggie, direction by Matt Cibelli
- One Life to Live as Delilah Ralston, direction by ABC-TV
- Show Boat as Julie, direction by PBS – Great Performances
- Miami Vice (Guest Star) as Angelica / Vote of Confidence, direction by NBC-TV
- Stop the World I Want to Get Off as Jane, direction by Mel Shapiro
- Held for Ransom as Mrs. McCormack, direction by Lee Stanley
- Identity Crisis as Roxy, direction by Melvin Van Peebles
- Cat's Eye as Jerrilyn, direction by Lewis Teague
- Spenser: For Hire (Guest Star) as Diedre / Angel Desolation, direction by ABC-TV
- So this Priest Walks Into a Bar as The Woman, direction by Mark Lundsten

=== Theatre and stage ===
- Stop the World – I Want to Get Off – Broadway, direction by Mel Shapiro
- Annie – Broadway, direction by Martin Charnin
- Nine – Broadway, direction by Tommy Tune
- Show Boat – Paper Mill Playhouse, direction by Robert Johanson
- Man of La Mancha – Mark Two Theatre, direction by Mark Howard
- A Closer Walk With Patsy Cline – direction by Mark Howard
- Robin Hood – direction by Martin Charnin
- Later Life – direction by Martin Charnin
- Mata Hari – direction by Martin Charnin
- Annie Warbucks – direction by Martin Charnin
- Love is Love – direction by Martin Charnin
- Company – direction by David Armstrong
- Shadowlands – direction by Martin Charnin
- Rodgers &... – direction by Martin Charnin
- 42nd Street – direction by Steve Tompkins
- The Melody Lingers On – direction by Martin Charnin
- Broadway Spoken Here – direction by Martin Charnin
- Day of Music – direction by Ludovic Moriot
- Real to Reel – (Songs from the stage to screen) – direction by Martin Charnin
- The Broadway Revues – (The Great Broadway Revues from The Follies to Sugar Babies) – direction by Martin Charnin
- Incurably Romantic – The Mad Cow Theatre
- Second Coming – 54 Below, New York City
- One Night Only – The Emelin Theatre
- I Happen To Like New York – The Emelin Theatre – Direction Martin Charnin
- In The Secret Sea-Direction Martin Charnin
- Forgotten Broadway – The Emelin Theatre-direction Martin Charnin
- Songbird-Metropolitan Room-direction Martin Charnin
- several revues – The Emelin Theatre – all directed by Martin Charnin
- several night-club acts – all directed by Martin Charnin
- Incurably Romantic-the music of Martin Charnin
