= Nine (musical) =

1982 American stage musical

- Original Playbill
- Music: Maury Yeston
- Lyrics: Maury Yeston
- Book: Arthur Kopit
- Basis: 8½ by: Federico Fellini; Tullio Pinelli; Ennio Flaiano; Brunello Rondi
- Productions: 1982 Broadway; 1984 US national tour 1996 West End; 2003 Broadway revival
- Awards: 1982 Tony Award for Best Musical; 1982 Tony Award for Best Original Score; 2003 Tony Award for Best Revival of a Musical

Nine is a musical initiated by and with music and lyrics by Maury Yeston and a book by Arthur Kopit. Based on the film 8½, it tells the story of film director Guido Contini, who is dreading his imminent 40th birthday and facing a midlife crisis, which is blocking his creative impulses and entangling him in a web of romantic difficulties in early-1960s Venice.

Conceived and written and composed by Yeston as a class project in the BMI Lehman Engel Musical Theatre Workshop in 1973, it was later adapted with a book by Mario Fratti, and then with another book by Arthur Kopit. The original Broadway production opened in 1982 and ran for 729 performances, starring Raul Julia. The musical won five Tony Awards (including Best Musical) and has enjoyed a number of revivals.

A film adaptation was released in 2009.

== Plot ==
=== Act I ===
Guido Contini, a famous Italian film director, has turned forty and faces double crises: he has to shoot a film for which he can't write the script, and his wife of twenty years, film star Luisa del Forno, may leave him if he can't pay more attention to their marriage.

Luisa's efforts to talk to him are drowned out by voices in his head: voices of women in his life whom he has loved ("Overture delle Donne").

In an attempt to find some peace and save the marriage, they go to a spa near Venice ("Spa Music"), where they are immediately hunted down by the press with intrusive questions about their marriage and Guido's imminent film project, which he has not told Luisa about ("Not Since Chaplin").

As Guido struggles to find a story for his film, he becomes increasingly preoccupied, his interior world sometimes becoming indistinguishable from reality ("Guido's Song"). His mistress Carla arrives in Venice, calling him from her hotel room ("A Call from the Vatican"). His producer Liliane La Fleur, former vedette of the Folies Bergeres, insists he make a musical, an idea which veers off into a vivid fantasy ("The Script / Folies Bergeres"). All the while, Luisa watches, the resilience of her love being consumed by anxiety for him and a gathering dismay about their life together ("My Husband Makes Movies / Only With You").

In Guido's imagination, he encounters his mother bathing a nine-year-old boy—his own young self ("Nine"). The vision leads him to re-encounter a moment on a beach with Saraghina, a prostitute to whom he went as a curious child, sneaking out of his Catholic boarding school St. Sebastian, to ask her to tell him about love. Her answer, to be yourself ("Ti Voglio Bene / Be Italian"), and the dance she taught him reminds the forty-year-old Guido of the consequences of that night—punishment by the nuns and rejection by his mother ("The Bells of St. Sebastian"). Unable to bear the adults, the little boy runs back to the beach to find no one.

=== Act II ===
Back into the present, Guido is on a beach once more. With him is Claudia Nardi, a film star and his muse, who has flown in from Paris for him; however, she does not want the role. He is enraged by her rejection. Claudia loves him but wants him to love her as a person and not a "spirit", which he cannot do. She calls him "My charming Casanova!", thereby involuntarily giving Guido the inspiration he needs ("A Man Like You"). Claudia lets him go ("Unusual Way"), Guido has an idea for a movie set on the Grand Canal and cast with every woman in his life ("The Grand Canal").

During the filming of the movie, Carla races onto the set to announce her divorce and her delight that they can be married, only to be rejected by Guido in his fixation on the film. Luisa is enraged and saddened by his use of their intimacy and her words as a source for the film. Guido keeps the cameras rolling, capturing the desolation of the women he loves ("Cut, Print!").

The film is dead. Carla leaves with a broken heart ("Simple"). Claudia sends a letter from Paris to say that she has married. Luisa ends their marriage ("Be On Your Own").

Guido is alone and directionless, contemplating suicide ("I Can't Make This Movie"). As the gun is at his head, he is interrupted by his nine-year-old self telling him it is time to grow up and move on, and Guido surrenders the gun ("Getting Tall"). The women return, this time to let him go, with the exception of Luisa ("Reprises"). Guido feels the aching void left by the only woman he will ever love. In the 2003 Broadway production, as the boy leads the women off, Luisa steps into the room on the final note, and Guido turns toward her.

== Productions ==
=== Workshop ===
Originally conceived as a male/female cast, many of the changes into a mostly female cast occurred in a workshop rehearsed in the upstairs theatre at the New Amsterdam Theatre in late 1981. For their participation, the workshop cast was given a small percentage of the show for a limited amount of time. Kathi Moss was the only cast member of the original Broadway cast who did not participate in the workshop (Pat Ast played the role of Saraghina in the workshop).

=== Original Broadway production ===
After nineteen previews, the Broadway production, directed by Tommy Tune and choreographed by Thommie Walsh, opened on May 9, 1982, at the 46th Street Theatre, where it ran for 729 performances. The cast included Raul Julia as Guido, Karen Akers as Luisa, Liliane Montevecchi as Liliane, Anita Morris as Carla, Shelly Burch as Claudia, Camille Saviola as Mama Maddelena, Kathi Moss as Saraghina, Cameron Johann as Young Guido, and Taina Elg as Guido's mother. Raul Julia played Guido for one year, from May 9, 1982, to May 8, 1983. (Bert Convy replaced Julia while he was on vacation for two weeks, beginning January 10, 1983.) Sergio Franchi starred as Guido for 330 performances, from May 9, 1983, to February 4, 1984, the date the production closed; composer Maury Yeston added a Franchi-style ballad, "Now Is the Moment", to the lovely Italian-sounding score. Other replacements were Maureen McGovern and then Eileen Barnett as Luisa, Wanda Richert as Carla, Priscilla Lopez as Liliane, and Barbara Stock as Claudia. Once the original boys reached the required height for their roles, they were replaced by Derek Scott Lashine as Little Guido, Jeffrey Vitelli (also the understudy for Little Guido), Braden Danner, and Peter Brendon. The musical won five Tony Awards, including best musical and three Drama Desk Awards, including Best Music, Best Lyrics, and Best Musical. An original cast recording was released by Sony and was nominated for a Grammy Award. A Broadway revival was mounted in 2003.

=== National tour ===
The original plans were for the Broadway show to continue even as the National tour commenced. However the new producers (James Nederlander and Zev Buffman) made the right offer for the road show, and the Broadway production was closed so that the whole Broadway cast could go on the road with Sergio Franchi as the headliner. Nineteen cities were originally planned, but several venue changes were made during the tour. The most prominent was the canceling of a Baton Rouge venue so that show could serve for the Grand Opening of the Los Angeles Civic Light Opera season. This was to accommodate the cancellation of On Your Toes after Leslie Caron (the star) was hospitalized due to a hip injury. When the decision was made to close the road show after the San Francisco shows, Louisiana fans were upset that an alternate date had not been created for them. (Sergio Franchi was extremely popular in Louisiana.) The reviews were generally very favorable, although a DC reviewer lamented some production changes (although admitting that they had not viewed the original Broadway production). The production venue was changed from a spa to a railroad station, principally to accommodate the volume of scenery that needed to be transported from location to location. The other change lamented in DC was the lighting. One review of the Florida production acknowledged that the grey railroad station with light-studded arches may have been "even more surreal than its creators may have intended." In contrast, the San Diego reviewer expressed admiration for Marcia Madeira's "flattering light design" and declared "Nine" to be "wonderful to watch."

- 1984 "Nine" – The National tour – Sergio Franchi starring as Guido Contini (although not a complete list, the following references were found):

Washington, DC – Kennedy Center Opera House – April 4, 1984 through April 21, 1984
Miami Beach, FL – Miami Beach Theater of Performing Arts – May 4, 1984 through May 17, 1984
Los Angeles – Dorothy Chandler Pavilion Music Center - May 23, 1984 through June 1, 1984
Dallas, TX – Majestic Theater – June 5, 1984 through June 17, 1984
San Diego, CA - Fox Theater - July 2, 1984 through July 7, 1984
Seattle, WA - 5th Avenue Theater - July 10, 1984 through July 15, 1984
San Francisco, CA - Week of August 24, 1984

=== London productions ===
On June 7, 1992, the largest production of Nine to date was presented in concert in London at Royal Festival Hall with Jonathan Pryce, Becky Norman, Elizabeth Sastre, Ann Crumb, Kate Copstick, Meg Johnson and Liliane Montevecchi. 165 people were in the cast, including male characters, as originally conceived. The production was directed by Andrew MacBean and a recording of the concert (with Elaine Paige stepping in as Claudia) was released by RCA Victor.

On December 12, 1996, a small-scale production directed by David Leveaux and choreographed by Jonathan Butterell opened at the Donmar Warehouse, where it ran for three months. Performers included Larry Lamb (Guido Contini), Ian Covington (Young Guido), Sara Kestelman (Liliane La Fleur), Clare Burt (Carla), Eleanor David (Claudia), Susannah Fellows (Luisa), Jenny Galloway (Saraghina), Ria Jones (Stephanie Necrophorus), Dilys Laye (Guido's Mother), Kiran Hocking (Our Lady of the Spa). Other cast members included Emma Dears, Kristin Marks, Tessa Pritchard, Sarah Parish, Norma Atallah and Susie Dumbreck. It was designed by Anthony Ward.

=== Broadway revival ===
In 2003, the Roundabout Theatre Company produced a Broadway revival with director Leveaux and choreographer Butterell. It opened on April 10, 2003, at the Eugene O'Neill Theatre, where it ran for 283 performances and 23 previews and won two Tony Awards, including Best Revival of a Musical. The cast included Antonio Banderas as Guido, Mary Stuart Masterson as Luisa, Chita Rivera as Liliane (all receiving Tony Award nominations), Jane Krakowski as Carla (winning the Tony), Laura Benanti as Claudia, and Mary Beth Peil as Guido's mother. Replacements later in the run included John Stamos as Guido, Eartha Kitt as Liliane, Rebecca Luker as Claudia, and Marni Nixon as Guido's mother. Yeston replaced a waltz dance from the original Folies Bergere number with a showstopping Tango Duet for Banderas and Rivera, a revival cast recording was released by PS Classics. Jenna Elfman was hired and advertised to join the cast as Carla at the same time that Stamos and Kitt were joining the production. A few days before the opening it was announced she needed more rehearsal time and that her understudy Sara Gettelfinger would take over temporarily. Elfman never did join the company and Gettelfinger played the rest of the run.

=== International productions ===
The European premiere of Nine opened in Sweden, at the Oscarsteatern, Stockholm, September 23, 1983, with Ernst-Hugo Järegård (Guido), Siw Malmkvist (Luisa), Viveka Anderberg (Claudia), Suzanne Brenning (Carla), Anna Sundqvist (Saraghina), Berit Carlberg (Liliane La Fleur), Helena Fernell (Stephanie), Maj Lindström (Guido's Mother), Moa Myrén (Lady of the Spa), Ewa Roos (Mama Maddalena), Lena Nordin(Maria). Other cast members included Monica Janner, Marit Selfjord, Berit Bogg, Ragnhild Sjögren, Solgärd Kjellgren, Ann-Christine Bengtsson, Siw Marie Andersson, Anna Maria Söderström, Susanne Sahlberg, Vivian Burman, Hanne Kirkerud, Susie Sulocki, Annika Persson, Charlotte Assarsson, Anna-Lena Engström, and Kim Sulocki (Guido as a child).

The Australian premiere of Nine was staged in Melbourne at the Comedy Theatre in 1987. John Diedrich produced, directed and starred as Guido Contini. Maury Yeston after attending the Sydney opening night proclaimed that Maria Mercedes was the definitive Luisa Contini. The cast also included a young Tina Arena, the Australian singer, songwriter and actress who went on to have an international recording and performing career. Other cast members included Nancye Hayes (as Liliane La Fleur), Peta Toppano as Claudia, Caroline Gillmer as Sarragina, Jackie Rees as Carla, Gerda Nicholson, Kerry Woods, Anna Lee, Sally Anne Bourne, Alana Clark, Sally Clark, Alison Jiear, Donna Lizzio, Cammie Munro, Marie-Jackson, Sharon Jessop, Alix Longman, Lisa O'Dea, Anne Sinclair, Janice Torrens, Penny Richards, and Mimi Rubin. A cast recording of the Australian production was recorded for Polydor and later released on CD by the TER record label. It won the ARIA Award for Best Original Soundtrack or Cast Album.

The Argentinian premiere of Nine (1998) won several ACE Awards including Mejor Musical. Performers included Juan Darthes (as Guido), Elena Roger, Ligia Piro, Luz Kerz, Sandra Ballesteros and Mirta Wons.

The musical premiered in Germany at the Theater des Westens in 1999 in Berlin.

The musical played in Malmö, Sweden at Malmö Opera in 2002 with Jan Kyhle (Guido), Marie Richardson (Luisa), Sharon Dyall (Claudia), Petra Nielsen (Carla), Marianne Mörck (Sarraghina), Lill Lindfors (Liliane La Fleur), Annica Edstam (Stephanie), Victoria Kahn (Gudio's Mother).

A Dutch production of Nine opened in an open-air theatre in Amersfoort in June 2005. Directed by Julia Bless, the production starred René van Zinnicq Bergmann, Frédèrique Sluyterman van Loo, Marleen van der Loo, Kirsten Cools, Tine Joustra, Veronique Sodano, Aafke van der Meij and Donna Vrijhof. The Dutch translation was by Theo Nijland.

The original Japanese production premiered in Tokyo in 2005 with Tetsuya Bessho as Guido Contini and Mizuki Ōura as Liliane La Fleur. In 2021 the Umeda Arts 2021 production in Tokyo and Osaka Nine won Japan's Yomiuri Theatre Award for Best Musical, Best Leading Actor: Yu Shirota, and Best Director: Shuntaro Fujita.

The musical premiered in San Juan, Puerto Rico in the fall of 2010 with Ernesto Concepción (Guido), Sara Jarque (Luisa), Wanda Sais (Carla), Marian Pabón (Lilliane Le Fleur), Tita Guerrero (Lina Darling), Michelle Brava (Claudia), Aidita Encarnación (Saraghina), Yezmín Luzzed (Stephanie), and Hilda Ramos (Mamma). The production was directed by Miguel Rosa who previously directed the Puerto Rico premiere of Rent in 2009.

The Phoenix Theatre in Arizona revived Nine in the spring of 2011, starring Craig Laurie (Guido), Patti Davis Suarez (Mother), Jeannie Shubitz (Luisa), Kim Manning (Liliane), Jenny Hintze (Claudia), and Johanna Carlisle (Saraghina).

The musical premiered in Manila, the Philippines, in September 2012, produced by Atlantis Productions. Jett Pangan (Guido) alongside an all-star cast of women, scenic design by Tony Award-winning David Gallo and costume design by Robin Tomas.

The musical premiered in the Czech Republic, at the Josef Kajetán Tyl Theatre in Plzeň in December 2012.

The Greek production opened in Pantheon Theatre in Athens in November 2015, starring Vassilis Charalampopoulos as Guido, Helena Paparizou as Saraghina.

The musical premiered in Brazil, at Teatro Porto Seguro, in São Paulo, directed by Charles Möeller and Claudio Botelho, starring Italian actor Nicola Lama as Guido, Carol Castro as Luisa, Totia Meireles as Lili la Fleur, Malu Rodrigues (Carla), Karen Junqueira and Vanessa Costa alternating as Claudia, Letícia Birkheuer (Stephanie), Beatriz Segall and Sonia Clara alternating as Guido's mother and Myra Ruiz (Saraghina).

A Spanish production premiered on June 7, 2018, at the Teatro Amaya in Madrid, with a cast formed by Alvaro Puertas (Guido), Roko (Luisa), Patrizia Ruiz (Claudia), Chanel Terrero (Carla), Marcela Paoli (Liliane Le Fleur), Idaira Fernández (Saraghina), Chus Herranz (Stephanie), and Angels Jiménez (Guido's Mother).

== Musical numbers ==
Act I

- "Overture Delle Donne" – Company
- "Not Since Chaplin" – Company
- "Guido's Song" – Guido
- "Not Since Chaplin - Reprise" – Company
- "The Germans at the Spa" – Maddelena, Italians and Germans
- "Not Since Chaplin - Reprise" – Company
- "My Husband Makes Movies" – Luisa
- "A Call from the Vatican" – Carla
- "Only with You" – Guido
- "The Script" – Guido
- "Folies Bergères" – Lilli, Stephanie and Company
- "Nine" – Guido's Mother and Company
- "Ti Voglio Bene/Be Italian" – Saraghina, Boys and Company
- "The Bells of St. Sebastian" – Guido and Company

Act II

- "A Man Like You/Unusual Way/Duet" – Claudia and Guido
- "The Grand Canal" (Every Girl in Venice/Amor/Only You) – Guido and Company
- "Simple" – Carla
- "Be On Your Own" – Luisa
- "Not Since Chaplin – Reprise" – Company
- "I Can't Make This Movie" – Guido
- "Getting Tall" – Young Guido
- "Long Ago/Nine - Reprise" – Guido, Young Guido and Luisa

- Maury Yeston added a new number, "Now is the Moment", for Sergio Franchi.
- The 2003 revival eliminated "The Germans at the Spa".

== Background ==
Maury Yeston began work on the musical in 1973. As a teenager, he had seen the Federico Fellini film 8½ and was intrigued by its themes. "I looked at the screen and said 'That's me.' I still believed in all the dreams and ideals of what it was to be an artist, and here was a movie about an artist in trouble. It became an obsession," Yeston told the New York Times. He would go on to say "Nine was the thing I really desperately wanted to write—never thinking for a minute that it would ever be produced. The movie had a phenomenal impact on me when I saw it as a teenager when it first came out. I was fascinated with Guido who was going through a second adolescence when I was going through my first! As I grew I began to realize that there was room to explore the reactions of the inner workings of the women in Guido's wake. I think that's what opened the gateways of creativity for Nine—to hear from these extraordinary women. The great secret of Nine is that it took 8 1/2 and became an essay on the power of women by answering the question, 'What are women to men?' And Nine tells you: they are our mothers, our sisters, our teachers, our temptresses, our judges, our nurses, our wives, our mistresses, our muses." Playwright Mario Fratti began working on the book of the musical in 1977, but the producers and director Tommy Tune eventually decided his script did not work, and brought in Arthur Kopit in 1981 to write an entirely new book, working (as Fratti had) with Yeston as composer/lyricist, but now using Yeston's music, and Fellini's film, as the source. Kopit's new book, along with Yeston's now completed score, became the script produced on Broadway in 1982.

Fellini had entitled his film 8½ in recognition of his prior body of work, which included six full-length films, two short films, and one film that he co-directed. Yeston's title for the musical adaptation adds another half-credit to Fellini's output and refers to Guido's age during his first hallucination sequence. Yeston called the musical Nine, explaining that if you add music to 8½, "it's like half a number more."

== Casts ==
Character	1982 Broadway	1984 National tour	1992 London	1996 Donmar Warehouse	2003 Broadway	2024 Kennedy Center
Guido Contini	Raul Julia	Sergio Franchi	Jonathan Pryce	Larry Lamb	Antonio Banderas	Steven Pasquale
Luisa Contini	Karen Akers	Diane M. Hurley	Ann Crumb	Susannah Fellows	Mary Stuart Masterson	Elizabeth Stanley
Carla Albanese	Anita Morris	Karla Tamburrelli	Becky Norman	Clare Burt	Jane Krakowski	Michelle Veintimilla
Liliane La Fleur	Liliane Montevecchi	Jacqueline Doughet	Liliane Montevecchi	Sara Kestelman	Chita Rivera	Carolee Carmello
Claudia Nardi	Shelly Burch	Lauren Mitchell	Elizabeth Sastre	Eleanor David	Laura Benanti	Shereen Ahmed
Guido's Mother	Taina Elg	Leigh Beery	Fiona O'Neill; Eileen Page	Dilys Laye	Mary Beth Peil	Mary Elizabeth Mastrantonio
Young Guido	Cameron Johann	Danny Barak	Danny Mertsoy	Ian Covington	William Ullrich	Charlie Firlik
Saraghina	Kathi Moss	Camille Saviola	Ellen O'Grady	Jenny Galloway	Myra Lucretia Taylor	Lesli Margherita
Stephanie Necrophorus	Stephanie Cotsirilos	Kathryn Skatula	Anita Dobson	Ria Jones	Saundra Santiago	Jen Sese
Our Lady of the Spa	Kate Dezina	O'Hara Parker	Sarah Payne	Kiran Hocking	Deidre Goodwin	Sasha Hutchings as Asa Nisi Masa
Lina Darling	Laura Kenyon	Chikae Ishikawa	Nadia Strahan	Norma Atallah	Nell Campbell	Lily Ling
Mama Maddelena	Camille Saviola	Holly Lipton Nash	Meg Johnson	—N/a	—N/a	Allison Blackwell
Diana	Cynthia Meryl	Margareta Arvidsson	—N/a	Tessa Pritchard	Rachel deBenedet	Haley Fish
Juliette	—N/a	—N/a	—N/a	—N/a	Rona Figueroa	—N/a
Maria	Jeanie Bowers	Candace Rogers	—N/a	Sarah Parish	Sara Gettelfinger	Paloma Garcia-Lee
Annabella	Nancy McCall	Nancy McCall	—N/a	Kristin Marks	Kristin Marks	Georgina Pazcoguin
Olga von Hesse	Dee Etta Rowe	Lou Ann Miles	—N/a	Susie Dumbreck	Linda Mugleston	—N/a
Renata	Rita Rehn	Pegg Winter	—N/a	Emma Dears	Elena Shaddow	—N/a
Sofia	—N/a	—N/a	—N/a	—N/a	Kathy Voytko	—N/a
Francesca	Kim Criswell	Barbara Walsh	—N/a	—N/a	—N/a	—N/a
Giulietta	Louise Edeiken	Louise Edeiken	—N/a	—N/a	—N/a	—N/a
Gretchen von Krupf	Lulu Downs	Mary Stout	—N/a	—N/a	—N/a	—N/a
Heidi von Sturm	Linda Kerns	Mary Chesterman	—N/a	—N/a	—N/a	—N/a
Ilsa von Hesse	Alaina Warren Zachary	Melody Jones	—N/a	—N/a	—N/a	—N/a
A Venetian Gondolier	Colleen Dodson	Philip Maranges	—N/a	—N/a	—N/a	—N/a
Young Guido's Schoolmate	Evans Allen; Jadrien Steele; Patrick Wilcox	Jason Dinter; Jonathan H. Florman	—N/a	—N/a	—N/a	—N/a

== Awards and nominations ==
=== Original Broadway production ===
Year	Award	Category	Nominee	Result
1982	Tony Award	Best Musical		Won
1982	Tony Award	Best Book of a Musical	Arthur Kopit	Nominated
1982	Tony Award	Best Original Score	Maury Yeston	Won
1982	Tony Award	Best Performance by a Leading Actor in a Musical	Raul Julia	Nominated
1982	Tony Award	Best Performance by a Featured Actress in a Musical	Karen Akers	Nominated
1982	Tony Award	Best Performance by a Featured Actress in a Musical	Liliane Montevecchi	Won
1982	Tony Award	Best Performance by a Featured Actress in a Musical	Anita Morris	Nominated
1982	Tony Award	Best Direction of a Musical	Tommy Tune	Won
1982	Tony Award	Best Choreography	Thommie Walsh	Nominated
1982	Tony Award	Best Scenic Design	Lawrence Miller	Nominated
1982	Tony Award	Best Costume Design	William Ivey Long	Won
1982	Tony Award	Best Lighting Design	Marcia Madeira	Nominated
1982	Drama Desk Award	Outstanding Musical		Won
1982	Drama Desk Award	Outstanding Featured Actress in a Musical	Shelly Burch	Nominated
1982	Drama Desk Award	Outstanding Featured Actress in a Musical	Liliane Montevecchi	Won
1982	Drama Desk Award	Outstanding Featured Actress in a Musical	Anita Morris	Won
1982	Drama Desk Award	Outstanding Director of a Musical	Tommy Tune	Won
1982	Drama Desk Award	Outstanding Lyrics	Maury Yeston	Won
1982	Drama Desk Award	Outstanding Music	Maury Yeston	Won
1982	Drama Desk Award	Outstanding Costume Design	William Ivey Long	Won
1982	Drama Desk Award	Outstanding Lighting Design	Marcia Madeira	Won
1982	Theatre World Award		Karen Akers	Won
1983	Grammy Award	Best Musical Show Album	Nine	Nominated

=== Original London production ===
Year	Award	Category	Nominee	Result
1996	Laurence Olivier Award	Best New Musical		Nominated

=== 2003 Broadway revival ===
Year	Award	Category	Nominee	Result
2003	Tony Award	Best Revival of a Musical		Won
2003	Tony Award	Best Performance by a Leading Actor in a Musical	Antonio Banderas	Nominated
2003	Tony Award	Best Performance by a Featured Actress in a Musical	Jane Krakowski	Won
2003	Tony Award	Best Performance by a Featured Actress in a Musical	Mary Stuart Masterson	Nominated
2003	Tony Award	Best Performance by a Featured Actress in a Musical	Chita Rivera	Nominated
2003	Tony Award	Best Direction of a Musical	David Leveaux	Nominated
2003	Tony Award	Best Lighting Design	Brian MacDevitt	Nominated
2003	Tony Award	Best Orchestrations	Jonathan Tunick	Nominated
2003	Drama Desk Award	Outstanding Revival		Won
2003	Drama Desk Award	Outstanding Actor in a Musical	Antonio Banderas	Won
2003	Drama Desk Award	Outstanding Featured Actress in a Musical	Mary Stuart Masterson	Nominated
2003	Drama Desk Award	Outstanding Featured Actress in a Musical	Chita Rivera	Nominated
2003	Drama Desk Award	Outstanding Featured Actress in a Musical	Jane Krakowski	Won
2003	Drama Desk Award	Outstanding Director of a Musical	David Leveaux	Nominated
2003	Theatre World Award		Antonio Banderas	Won
2003	Theatre World Award		Mary Stuart Masterson	Won
2004	Grammy Award	Best Musical Show Album	Nine	Nominated

== Film adaptation ==
On April 12, 2007, Variety announced that Rob Marshall would direct a feature film adaptation of Nine for the Weinstein Company. Marshall had previously directed Chicago for the Weinsteins while they were still at Miramax. The screenplay is written by Anthony Minghella with Michael Tolkin serving as an uncredited co-scripter. The cast consists of Academy Award winners Daniel Day-Lewis, Marion Cotillard, Penélope Cruz, Judi Dench, Nicole Kidman, and Sophia Loren, with Academy Award nominee and Golden Globe winner Kate Hudson and Grammy winning singer Fergie. Among other cast changes in the film version, the character of Mama Maddelena does not appear, and Claudia's surname was changed from Nardi to Jenssen. The script makes Guido 50 (Day-Lewis's actual age), not 40 as in the stage original. The film's final coda is more hopeful and optimistic than the stage version. In addition, director Marshall cut most of the original production's score, with only "Overture delle Donne", "Guido's Song", "A Call from the Vatican", "Folies Bergeres", "Be Italian", "My Husband Makes Movies", "Unusual Way", and an extended version of "I Can't Make This Movie" making it into the final edit of the film. Composer Maury Yeston wrote three new songs for the movie including "Cinema Italiano", "Guarda la Luna" to replace the title song, and "Take It All" in place of "Be On Your Own", as well as the instrumental concluding the film. The film is co-produced by Marshall's own production company Lucamar Productions. The film was released in the US on December 18, 2009, in New York and Los Angeles and opened for wide release on December 25, 2009.
