= Platinum (musical) =

- Music: Gary William Friedman
- Lyrics: Will Holt
- Book: Will Holt; Bruce Vilanch
- Productions: 1977 Studio Arena Theater; 1978 Broadway; 1983 Off-Broadway; 2010 FringeNYC (Revised)

Platinum is a stage musical with a book by Will Holt and Bruce Vilanch, music by Gary William Friedman, and lyrics by Holt.

Set in a Hollywood recording studio, it centers on Lila Halliday, a star of 1940s and 1950s movie musicals who is attempting a comeback. In the process, she falls for a young rock star named Dan Danger.

== Background ==
Platinum was originally titled Sunset when it had its world premiere in 1977 at the Studio Arena Theater in Buffalo, New York. The production, with a book by Louis LaRusso II, was directed by Tommy Tune. When the musical evolved into Platinum and moved to Broadway, only the songwriters, Alexis Smith, Lisa Mordente, and ensemble member Christine Faith remained with the production.

== Original cast and characters ==
Character	Broadway (1978)
Lila Halliday	Alexis Smith
Dan Danger	Richard Cox
Crystal Mason	Lisa Mordente
Robin	Robin Grean
Damita	Damita Jo Freeman
Avery	Avery Sommers
Jeff Leff	Stanley Kamel
Shultz	Tony Shultz
Wenndy	Wenndy Leigh Mackenzie
Boris	John Hammil
Christine	Christine Faith
Alan Fairmont / Mink	Jonathan Freeman

== Songs ==
- 1977 world premiere production

- Sunset City
- Nothing But
- Back With a Beat
- Rock is My Way of Life
- Destiny
- Disco Destiny
- Waltz
- Retreat
- Moments
- Montage
- Trials and Tribulations/I Like You
- True Music
- Retreat (Reprise)
- Good Time Song
- Finale

- 1978 Broadway production

Act One

- Back With a Beat/Nothing But
- Sunset
- Ride Baby Ride
- Destiny
- Disco Destiny
- I Am the Light
- Movie Star Mansion

Act Two

- Platinum Dreams
- Trials and Tribulations/I Like You
- 1945
- Too Many Mirrors
- Old Times, Good Times

- 1984 Village Gate NYC production

- Living on Sunset
- Nothing But
- The Funky
- Destiny
- Back With a Beat
- Standing In Need
- Rock is My Way of Life
- Sunset Dreams
- Dan's Rap
- Cheap Chablis
- Bug On The Windshield Of Life
- 1945
- Retreat
- I Am The Light
- Moments
- Old Times, Good Times
- This One's for Me

== Production history ==
Directed and choreographed by Joe Layton, the Broadway production of Platinum opened on November 12, 1978, at the Mark Hellinger Theatre, where it closed on December 10, 1978, after 33 performances and 12 previews. Despite its short run, it garnered Tony Award nominations for Smith and Richard Cox and Drama Desk Award nominations for Cox and Mordente. (A revised version of the original Sunset was presented off-Broadway at the Village Gate in November 1983. Starring Tammy Grimes and directed by Andre Ernotte it closed after one performance and 13 previews.)

In August 2010, a revised version of Platinum developed by UnsungMusicalsCo. Inc. played the New York International Fringe Festival. It was directed by Ben West with choreography by Rommy Sandhu.

== Critical reception ==
Douglas Watt, reviewing in the New York Daily News said the musical was "full of electricity and sends you into the night charged up." Platinum was "the first big fat hit" of the Broadway season, and Smith was "vibrant and smashing looking." He singled out the songs "Destiny" and "Movie Star Mansion." In all, the show was "a triumphant piece of musical staging" that achieved "pure excitement."

Martin Gottfried called Friedman's music, "excellent - melodic, ambitious, ingenious, and decidedly theatrical", and Holt's lyrics "clean and crafty."

On the flip side, Walter Kerr said, "I have a feeling that if Platinum could just get rid of its book, its songs, its microphones and its almost arrogantly messy setting, it would be light miles ahead."

In his 2015 reference compilation The Complete Book Of 1970's Broadway Musicals, author Dan Dietz said that the lyrics by Will Holt and the Music by Gary William Friedman "offered an array of clever and melodic songs, and their Platinum score is one of the most underrated of the era."

== Awards and nominations ==
1978 Tony Award nominations

- Best Actress – Alexis Smith
- Best Featured Actor – Richard Cox

1978 Drama Desk Award nominations

- Best Featured Actress – Lisa Mordente
- Best Featured Actor – Richard Cox
