= Chita Rivera =

American actress, dancer and singer (1933–2024)

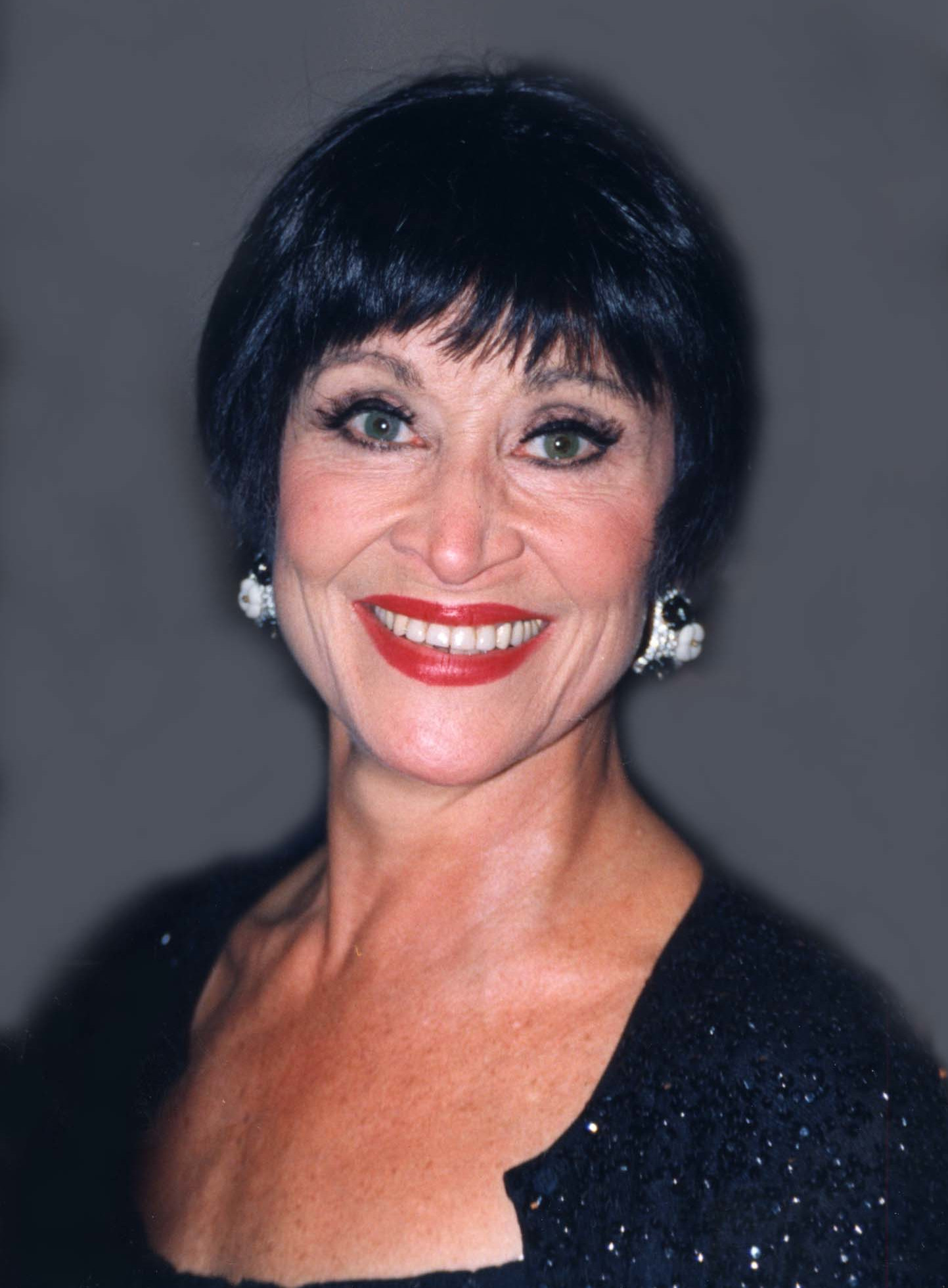
- Rivera in 1997
- Born: Dolores Conchita Figueroa del Rivero; January 23, 1933; Washington, D.C., U.S.
- Died: January 30, 2024 (aged 91); New York City, U.S.
- Occupations: Actress; dancer; singer
- Years active: 1950–2024
- Spouse: Tony Mordente (m. 1957; div. 1966)
- Children: Lisa Mordente
- Awards: Full list
- Website: chitarivera.com

Signature
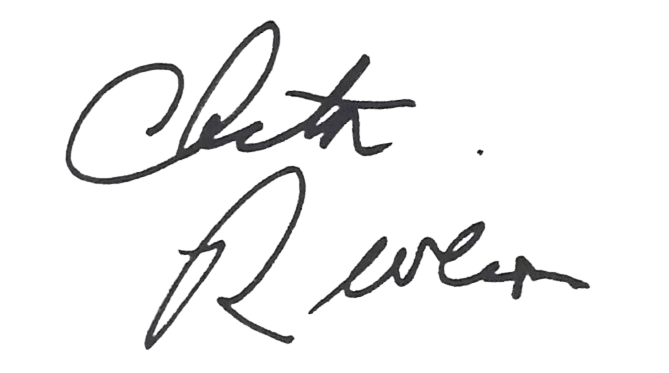

External audio
- "Chita Rivera" performs America and All That Jazz from 1982 on YouTube

Dolores Conchita Figueroa del Rivero (January 23, 1933 – January 30, 2024), known professionally as Chita Rivera, was an American actress, singer, and dancer. Rivera received numerous accolades including two Tony Awards, two Drama Desk Awards, and a Drama League Award. She was the first Latina and the first Latino American to receive a Kennedy Center Honor in 2002, and the Presidential Medal of Freedom in 2009. She won the Tony Award for Lifetime Achievement in 2018.

After making her Broadway debut as a dancer in Guys and Dolls (1950), she went on to originate roles in Broadway musicals such as Anita in West Side Story (1957), Velma Kelly in Chicago (1975), and the title role in Kiss of the Spider Woman (1993). She was a ten-time Tony Award nominee, winning the Tony Award for Best Actress in a Musical twice for her roles in The Rink (1984) and Kiss of the Spider Woman (1993). She was Tony-nominated for her roles in Bye Bye Birdie (1961), Chicago (1975), Bring Back Birdie (1981), Merlin (1983), Jerry's Girls (1986), Nine (2003), Chita Rivera: The Dancer's Life (2005), and The Visit (2015).

Rivera acted in the film Sweet Charity (1969) and appeared in Sgt. Pepper's Lonely Hearts Club Band (1978), and Tick, Tick... Boom! (2021). She played Connie Richardson in the CBS sitcom The New Dick Van Dyke Show (1973–1974). She also appeared on television in The Judy Garland Show (1963), The Carol Burnett Show (1971), and Will & Grace (2005). Her autobiography, Chita: A Memoir, was published in 2023.

== Early life and education ==
Dolores Conchita Figueroa del Rivero was born in Washington, D.C. on January 23, 1933, the daughter of Katherine (née Anderson), a government clerk, and Pedro Julio Figueroa del Rivero, a clarinetist and saxophonist for the U.S. Navy Band. Her father was born in Puerto Rico. His family names are of Galician origin. Her mother was of Scottish, Irish, and African-American descent. Rivera was one of five children. Rivera was seven years old when her mother was widowed and went to work at The Pentagon.

In 1944, Rivera's mother enrolled her in the Jones-Haywood School of Ballet (now the Jones Haywood School of Dance). Later, when she was 15, a teacher from George Balanchine's School of American Ballet visited their studio, and Rivera was one of two students picked to audition in New York City; she was accompanied to the audition by Doris Jones, one of the people who ran the Jones-Haywood School. Rivera's audition was successful, and she was accepted into the school and given a scholarship.

== Career ==
=== 1951–1993: Breakthrough and stardom ===
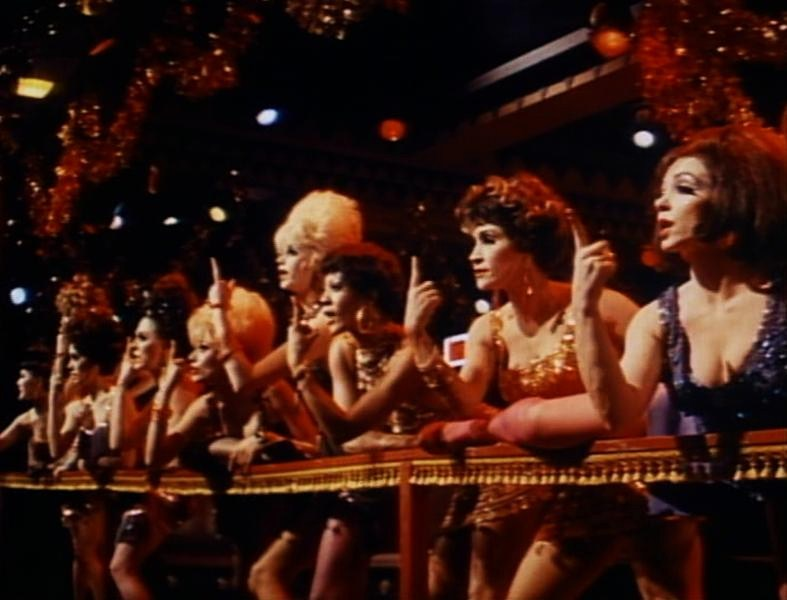
Paula Kelly (third from right) and Chita Rivera (second from right) in Sweet Charity (1969).

In 1951, Rivera accompanied a friend to the audition for the touring company of Call Me Madam starring Elaine Stritch and ended up winning the role herself. She followed this by landing roles in other Broadway productions such as Guys and Dolls, Can-Can, Mr. Wonderful starring Sammy Davis Jr., and Seventh Heaven and dancing on The Maurice Chevalier Special in 1956. In 1957, she was cast as Anita in West Side Story, the role that would make her a Broadway star.

In 1960, Rivera was nominated for a Tony Award for creating the role of Rose in Bye Bye Birdie opposite Dick Van Dyke. She appeared three times on The Ed Sullivan Show and won raves for her performance on Broadway and in London opposite Peter Marshall, but was passed over for the film version where the role was played by Janet Leigh. In 1963, Rivera was a guest on The Judy Garland Show and was cast opposite Alfred Drake in Zenda. The Broadway-bound musical closed on the road but in 1964, Rivera returned to Broadway in Bajour and television in The Outer Limits. After seeing her perform in the musical, music producer Norman Petty approached her in New York and inquired about recording with him. Her first single was released in 1965 on the Dot Records label, with a second single issued in 1966. Making a trip to Petty's studio in Clovis, New Mexico in 1966, she was backed by The Fireballs for a full album of Buddy Holly cover songs, but the project went unreleased.

Among many national tours, Rivera starred most notably in Sweet Charity directed by Bob Fosse, playing the role of Nickie in the film adaptation of Sweet Charity with Shirley MacLaine (1969). Rivera appeared three times on The Hollywood Palace, twice on The Carol Burnett Show (including an episode airing February 22, 1971) and between 1973 and 1974, played Connie Richardson on The New Dick Van Dyke Show. In 1975, Rivera was nominated for a Tony Award starring as Velma Kelly opposite Gwen Verdon in the original cast of the musical Chicago, directed by Bob Fosse. In addition to her ballet instructors, Rivera cited Leonard Bernstein and Verdon, with whom she starred in Chicago, as influential to her success. She later made a cameo appearance in the 2002 film version. She appeared as Fastrada in a filmed-for-television version of the musical Pippin in 1981, and was nominated for Tony and Drama Desk awards for Bring Back Birdie (1981) and a Tony Award for Merlin (1983) on Broadway.

In 1984, Rivera starred in the Kander and Ebb musical The Rink with Liza Minnelli and won her first Tony and Drama Desk awards for her role as Anna. In 1986, while earning a Tony Award nomination for her performance in the Jerry Herman musicalJerry's Girls, Rivera was in a severe accident when her car collided with a taxi on West 86th Street in Manhattan. Injuries sustained included the breaking of her left leg in twelve places, requiring eighteen screws and two braces to mend. After rehabilitation, Rivera continued to perform on stage. Recovered, in 1988, she toured the country in Can-Can and got involved in a restaurant venture in partnership with novelist Daniel Simone. The eatery, located on 42nd Street between 9th and 10th Avenue, was named "Chita's" after her. It soon became a significant attraction for the after-theater crowds and operated until 1994.

=== 1993–2023: Later career and roles ===
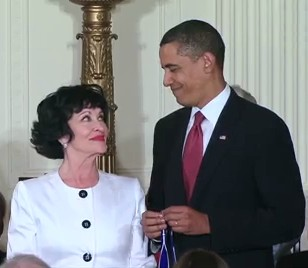
Rivera with President Barack Obama prior to receiving the Presidential Medal of Freedom, August 2009

In 1993, Rivera received Tony and Drama Desk awards for Best Leading Actress in a Musical for her dual portrayal of Aurora and Spider Woman in the musical Kiss of the Spider Woman, written by Kander and Ebb. Rivera later participated in the London edition of Kander and Ebb's long-running revival of Chicago, this time in the role of Roxie Hart. Rivera starred in the Goodman Theatre production of the musical The Visit (also by Kander and Ebb) as Claire Zachanassian in 2001. In 2002, she became a Kennedy Center Honoree. In 2003, Rivera returned to Broadway in the 2003 revival of Nine as Liliane La Fleur and received her eighth career Tony Award nomination (Best Featured Actress in a Musical) and fourth Drama Desk Award nomination (Outstanding Featured Actress in a Musical). She appeared with Antonio Banderas. She later appeared on the revival's cast album.

She guest-starred along with Michele Lee in a February 2005 episode of Will & Grace, and in December of that year, Chita Rivera: The Dancer's Life, a retrospective of her career, opened on Broadway. She received another Tony nomination for her self-portrayal. Though she was expected to reprise her role in a Signature Theatre staging of The Visit in autumn of 2007, that was later postponed to the following season. Instead, she performed at New York's Feinstein's at the Regency supper club in New York for two weeks and, in 2008, appeared in a revised production of The Visit at the Signature Theatre in Arlington, Virginia, co-starring George Hearn. Rivera guest-starred on Disney Channel's Johnny and the Sprites as Queen of All Magical Beings. The episode debuted on March 15, 2008.

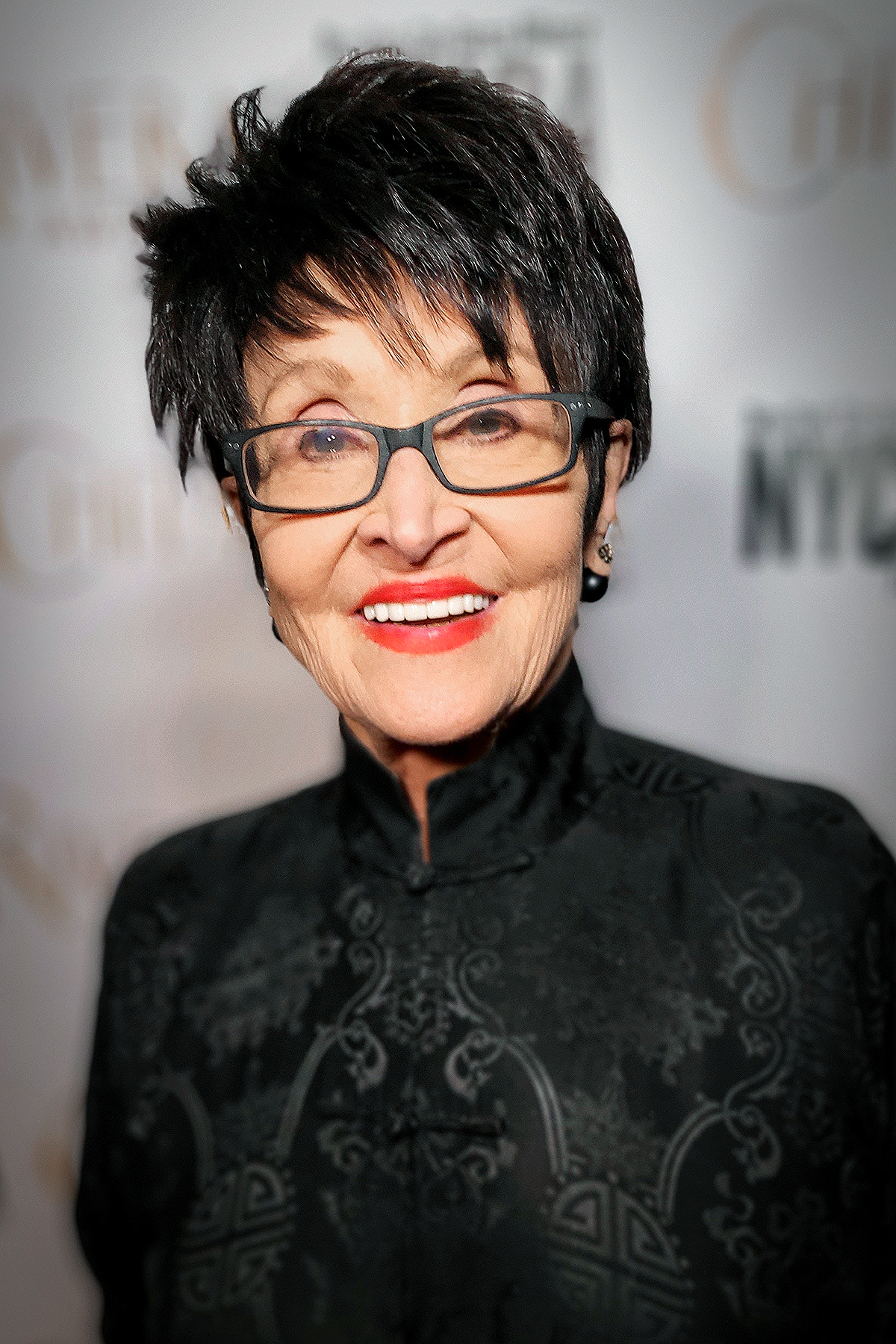
Rivera in 2022

In August 2009, U.S. president Barack Obama presented Rivera the Presidential Medal of Freedom. In the 1960s, Rivera had recorded two albums, Chita Rivera: Get Me To The Church On Time and And Now I Sing. These early 1960s albums were reissued on CD by Stage Door Records in February 2013. In November 2008, Rivera released her third solo album, And Now I Swing. Rivera performed in a staged concert of The Visit as a benefit at the Ambassador Theatre on November 30, 2011. In 2012, Rivera played "Princess Puffer" in the Broadway revival of The Mystery of Edwin Drood at Studio 54. She was the grand marshal of the Puerto Rican Day Parade in New York City on June 9, 2013.

Rivera returned to Broadway in The Visit, the final musical written by John Kander, Fred Ebb, and Terrence McNally. The musical opened at the Lyceum Theatre on March 26, 2015, and closed on June 14, 2015. Co-starring Roger Rees, the production was directed by John Doyle and choreographed by Graciela Daniele. Rivera received praise for her performance, and was nominated for a Tony Award, Best Performance by a Leading Actress in a Musical and a Drama Desk Award. The Astaire Awards were rebranded The Chita Rivera Awards for Dance and Choreography in 2017. In 2018, she received a Special Tony Award for Lifetime Achievement. In 2019, Time Out New York named her "one of the best Broadway divas of all time."

Rivera had been a frequent guest narrator at Disney's Candlelight Processional at Walt Disney World, last appearing in the 2021 and 2022 seasons.

== Personal life ==
On December 1, 1957, Rivera married fellow West Side Story dancer Tony Mordente. They were divorced in 1966. Rivera's performance was so important for the success of the show that the London production of West Side Story was postponed until she gave birth to the couple's daughter Lisa in 1958. Despite the divorce, Rivera and Mordente remained on good terms.

Rivera was a Catholic.

=== Death ===
Rivera died in New York following a brief illness on January 30, 2024, one week after her 91st birthday. Her ex-husband, Tony Mordente, died in June 2024, less than five months after Rivera's death.

== Acting credits ==
=== Film ===
Year	Title	Role	Notes
1969	Sweet Charity	Nickie	
1978	Sgt. Pepper's Lonely Hearts Club Band	Guest at Heartland	
1983	He Makes Me Feel Like Dancin'	Herself	Documentary
2002	Chicago	Nickie	Cameo
2003	Broadway: The Golden Age, by the Legends Who Were There	Herself	Documentary
2006	Kalamazoo?	Giannina	
2010	The Drawn Together Movie: The Movie!	Singer	Voice
2012	Carol Channing: Larger Than Life	Herself	Documentary
2012	Show Stopper: The Theatrical Life of Garth Drabinsky	Herself	Documentary
2018	Still Waiting in the Wings	Broadway Diva	Documentary
2021	Tick, Tick... Boom!	"Sunday" Legend	Final film role
2023	Studio One Forever	Herself	Documentary

=== Television ===
Year	Title	Role	Notes
1956	The Maurice Chevalier Show	Herself	1 episode
1960	The Gary Moore Show	Herself	1 episode
1960	The Ed Sullivan Show	Herself	S14.E6, performing "Spanish Rose" from musical Bye Bye Birdie
1963	The Judy Garland Show	Herself	Episode 17
1964	The Outer Limits	Mrs. Dane	Episode: "The Bellero Shield"
1965	The Hollywood Palace	Herself	1 episode
1971	The Carol Burnett Show	Various characters	Episode: "4.22"
1973	The Marcus-Nelson Murders	Josie Hopper	Television film
1973–1974	The New Dick Van Dyke Show	Connie Richardson	Main role; 7 episodes
1977	Once Upon a Brothers Grimm	Gingerbread Lady	Episode: "Hansel and Gretel"
1981	Pippin: His Life and Times	Fastrada	Television film
1982	Strawberry Ice	Performer	Television film
1985–2004	Great Performances	Herself	4 episodes
1987	Mayflower Madam	Risa Dickstein	Television film
1997	Happily Ever After: Fairy Tales for Every Child	Grasshopper	Voice, episode: "Thumbelina"
2004, 2019	Dora The Explorer	The Witch	Voice, 2 episodes
2005	Will & Grace	Lenore Portillo	Episode: "Dance Cards and Greeting Cards"
2008	Johnny and the Sprites	The Queen	Episode: "Johnny Not Invited"
2011	Submissions Only	Gladys Franklin	Episode: "Yore So Bad"

=== Theatre (selected) ===
Year	Title	Role	Venue	Ref.
1950	Guys and Dolls	Dancer (replacement)	46th Street Theatre	
1953	Can-Can	Dancer	Shubert Theatre	
1955	Seventh Heaven	Fifi	ANTA Playhouse	
1956	Mr. Wonderful	Rita Romano	Broadway Theatre	
1957	Shinbone Alley	Mehitabel	Broadway Theatre	
1957	West Side Story	Anita	Winter Garden Theatre	
1960	Bye Bye Birdie	Rose Alvarez	Martin Beck Theatre	
1964	Bajour	Anyanka	Shubert Theatre	
1975	Chicago	Velma Kelly	46th Street Theatre	
1981	Bring Back Birdie	Rose Alvarez	Martin Beck Theatre	
1983	Merlin	The Queen	Mark Hellinger Theatre	
1984	The Rink	Anna	Martin Beck Theatre	
1985	Jerry's Girls	Performer	St. James Theatre	
1993	Kiss of the Spider Woman	Spider Woman/Aurora	Broadhurst Theatre	
2003	Nine	Liliane La Fleur	Eugene O'Neill Theatre	
2005	Chita Rivera: The Dancer's Life	Herself	Gerald Schoenfeld Theatre	
2012	The Mystery of Edwin Drood	The Princess Puffer / Miss Angela Prysock	Studio 54	
2015	The Visit	Claire Zachannassian	Lyceum Theatre	

== Awards and honors ==
Rivera was nominated for the Tony Award ten times, twice for Best Featured Actress in a Musical and eight times for Best Actress in a Musical. Rivera's eight nominations in the latter category is the current record for nominations in that category. In 2009, she was presented with the Presidential Medal of Freedom by President Barack Obama. Rivera was honored as The New Jewish Home's Eight Over Eighty Gala 2016 honoree. She was awarded an honorary Doctor of Fine Arts degree from the University of Florida in 2018.

Year	Award	Category	Nominated work	Result	Ref(s)
1961	Tony Award	Best Featured Actress in a Musical	Bye Bye Birdie	Nominated	
1976	Tony Award	Best Actress in a Musical	Chicago	Nominated	
1981	Tony Award	Best Actress in a Musical	Bring Back Birdie	Nominated	
1981	Drama Desk Award	Outstanding Actress in a Musical	Bring Back Birdie	Nominated	
1983	Tony Award	Best Actress in a Musical	Merlin	Nominated	
1984	Tony Award	Best Actress in a Musical	The Rink	Won	
1984	Drama Desk Award	Outstanding Actress in a Musical	The Rink	Won	
1986	Tony Award	Best Actress in a Musical	Jerry's Girls	Nominated	
1993	Tony Award	Best Actress in a Musical	Kiss of the Spider Woman	Won	
1993	Drama Desk Award	Outstanding Actress in a Musical	Kiss of the Spider Woman	Won	
2002	Kennedy Center Honors	Kennedy Center Honors	Herself	Won	
2003	Tony Award	Best Performance by a Featured Actress in a Musical	Nine	Nominated	
2003	Drama Desk Award	Outstanding Featured Actress in a Musical	Nine	Nominated	
2006	Tony Award	Best Actress in a Musical	Chita Rivera: The Dancer's Life	Nominated	
2015	Tony Award	Best Actress in a Musical	The Visit	Nominated	
2015	Drama Desk Award	Outstanding Actress in a Musical	The Visit	Nominated	
2015	Drama League Award	Distinguished Performance	The Visit	Won	
2015	Theatre World Award	John Willis Award for Lifetime Achievement in the Theatre	Herself	Won	
2018	Tony Award	Special Tony Award	Herself	Won	

== See also ==
- List of Puerto Ricans
- List of Puerto Rican Presidential Medal of Freedom recipients
- List of people from Washington, D.C.
