= Estela Scarlata =

Argentine set designer and playwright

Estela "Piqui" Scarlata
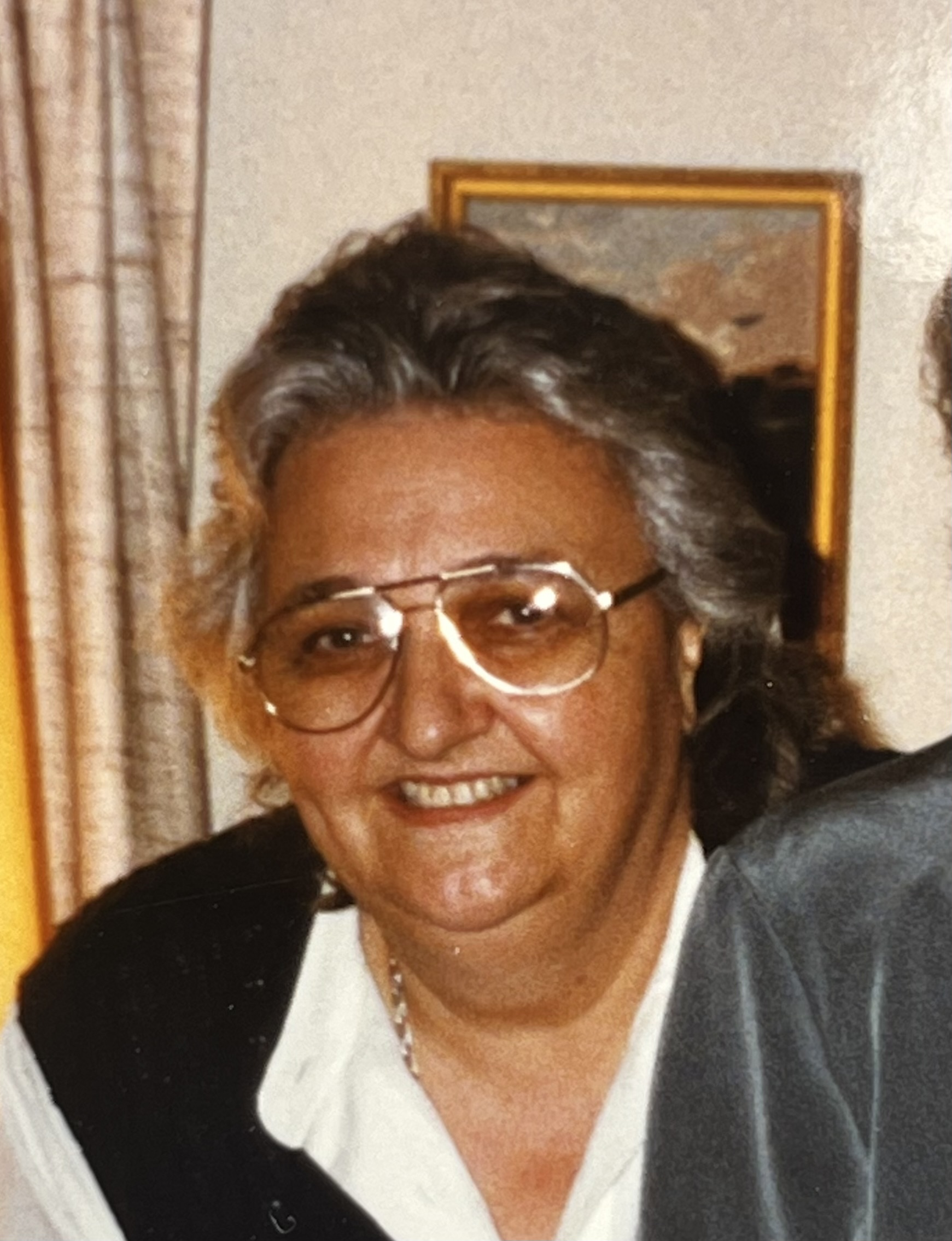
- Estela Scarlata in 1994.
- Born: March 23, 1942; Mar del Plata, Buenos Aires, Argentina
- Died: August 3, 2023 (aged 81); Mar de Plata, Buenos Aires, Argentina
- Other names: Piqui
- Occupations: Set designer, costume designer, stage manager, art restorer, playwright
- Years active: 55

Estela "Piqui" Scarlata (March 23, 1942 – August 3, 2023) was an Argentine set designer and playwright. She cofounded the Bilingual Foundation of the Arts with Carmen Zapata and Margarita Galban in 1972. She also worked for the Los Angeles Theatre Academy as a costume and set designer until 2019.

== Early life ==
Estela "Piqui" Scarlata was born in Mar del Plata, Buenos Aires, Argentina on March 23, 1942. Her family has Italian, Hungarian, Spanish, and Brazilian heritage. She moved to Los Angeles, California in 1965.

== Career ==
Scarlata began her career as an art restorer in Santa Monica before becoming a set designer at Teatro 6 Actores, a 99-seat theatre in Hollywood, California. In the early 1970s, Scarlata became one of the first women to work as a carpenter at CBS Channel 2.

In 1972, Scarlata co-founded the Bilingual Foundation of the Arts (BFA) with Managing Producer Carmen Zapata and Artistic Director Margarita Galban, and served as its Production Manager/Technical Director and Set Designer-in-Residence. She continued to work with BFA, which was housed in the decommissioned Lincoln Heights Jail, for 37 years, during which time she designed sets for between 150 and 200 plays.

Scarlata has authored several plays. In 1975, she worked with dramatist C. Bernard Jackson to translate her play La Factoria into Wanted: Experienced Operators, a musical about undocumented sweatshop workers. In the late 1980s, Scarlata also wrote a number of children's plays, including Rainbow Red, The Wiseman of Chichen Itza, and Young Moctezuma, some of which toured LAUSD schools. In 2008, she wrote Memorias del Tango, a musical about her family in Argentina.

Scarlata also served as Festival Coordinator for Reader's Theatre, a program she began at BFA in 1984 and ran until 2008, which featured a series of plays with audience discussion and feedback.

From 2011 to 2019, Scarlata worked as set and costume designer for the Los Angeles Theatre Academy (LATA). She also wrote and adapted several plays for the program.

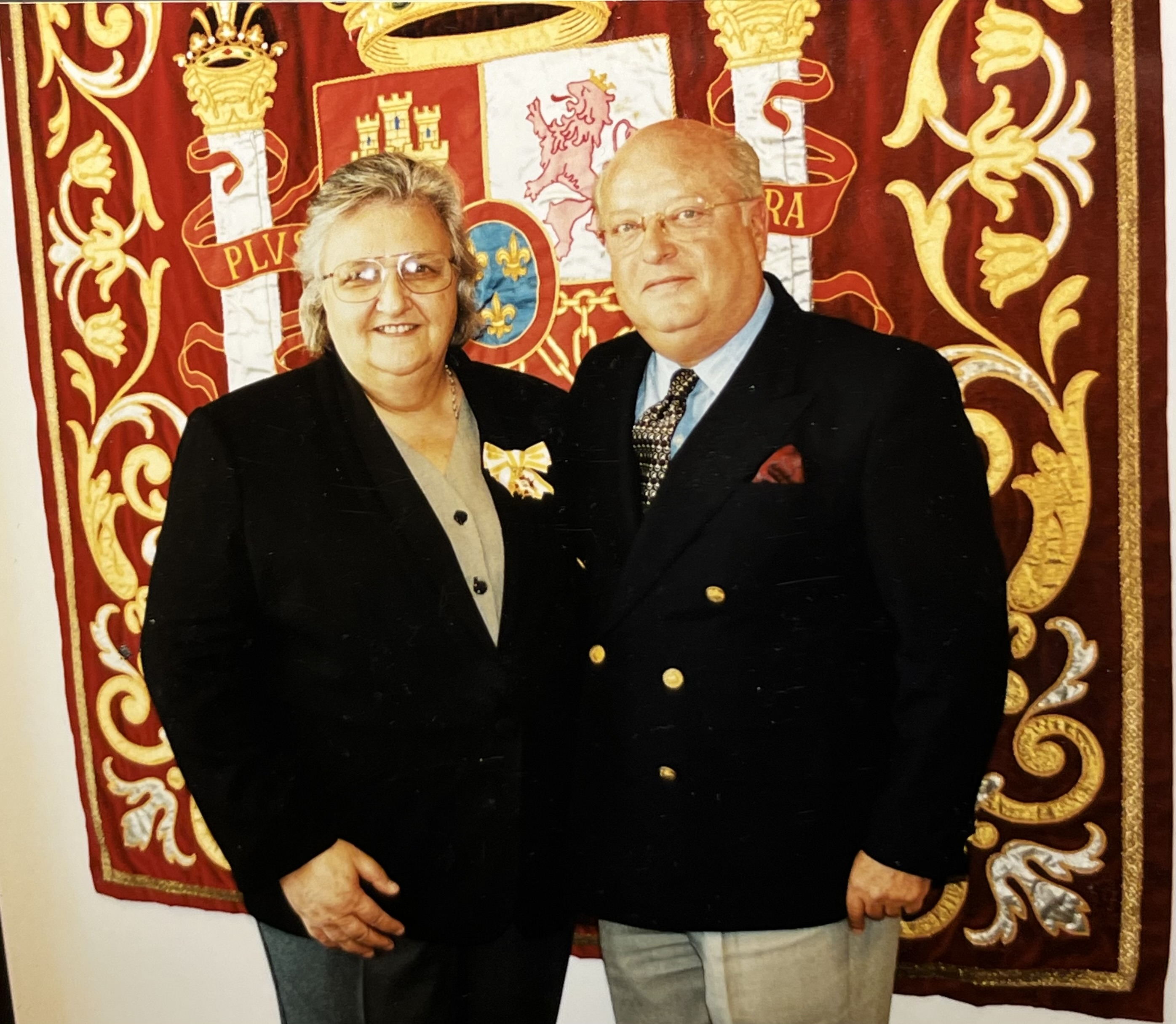
Estela Scarlata receiving the Official Cross of the Order of Isabella the Catholic from the Ambassador of Spain to the United States Antonio de Oyarzabal y Marchesi in 1999.

== Awards ==
Scarlata won the Drama-Logue Award for Artistic Achievement in Set Design for Doña Rosita La Soltera, shared with David Barber, in 1980, The House of Bernarda Alba in 1997 and 1998, and The Misfortunes of a House in 1998. In 1999, Scarlata was knighted by his majesty King Juan Carlos of Spain, and received the Official Cross of the Order of Isabella the Catholic for her commitment to preserving the Hispanic language and culture through performing arts.

== Theatre productions ==
Title	Venue	Year(s)	Notes
Los signos del zodiaco	Golden Gate Theatre	1972	
El Quelite	Golden Gate Theatre	1973	
Wanted: Experienced Operators	Inner City Cultural Center, Fresno Convention Center, Al J. Williams Theatre, several venues	1975	Play cowritten by Estela Scarlata.
Doña Rosita la soltera	Bilingual Foundation of the Arts	1980	1980 Drama-Logue Award for Artistic Achievement in Set Design shared with David Barber.
Rainbow Red	Bilingual Foundation of the Arts, several LAUSD schools	1980–1986	Written by Estela Scarlata.
The Wiseman of Chichen Itza	Bilingual Foundation of the Arts, several LAUSD schools	1988–1990	Written by Estela Scarlata.
Young Moctezuma	Bilingual Foundation of the Arts, several LAUSD schools	1989	Written by Estela Scarlata.
La Celestina	Bilingual Foundation of the Arts	1992	
The House of the Spirits/La Casa de los Espiritus	Bilingual Foundation of the Arts	1996	
The House of Bernarda Alba	Bilingual Foundation of the Arts	1997–2007	1997 and 1998 Drama-Logue Award for Artistic Achievement in Set Design.
The Misfortunes of a House	Bilingual Foundation of the Arts	1998	1998 Drama-Logue Award for Artistic Achievement in Set Design.
Our Lady of the Tortilla	Bilingual Foundation of the Arts	1998	
Parade of Strange Images	Bilingual Foundation of the Arts	1998	
Too Many Tamales	Bilingual Foundation of the Arts	1999–2007	
Maria La O	Bilingual Foundation of the Arts	1999–2007	
Witless Lady/La Dama Boba	Bilingual Foundation of the Arts	1999	
Guantanamera	Bilingual Foundation of the Arts	1999	
Blood Wedding	Bilingual Foundation of the Arts	1999	
Rosalba y los Llaveros	Bilingual Foundation of the Arts	2000	In collaboration with Danza Floricanto and Los Angeles Cultural Affairs Department
La Venganza de Don Mendo	Bilingual Foundation of the Arts	2001	
Salon Mexico	Bilingual Foundation of the Arts	2001–2005	
Lorca y Las Mujeres	Bilingual Foundation of the Arts	2002	
El Alcalde de Zalamea	Bilingual Foundation of the Arts	2002	
Juventud, divino tesoro/Divine Treasure of Youth	Bilingual Foundation of the Arts	2002	
Los Clasicos Enredos	Bilingual Foundation of the Arts	2003	
Don Juan Tenorio	Bilingual Foundation of the Arts	2003	
Fiesta del Dia de los Muertos	Bilingual Foundation of the Arts	2004	
Reader's Theatre	Bilingual Foundation of the Arts	2004	Estela Scarlata served as Festival Coordinator for this event.
Zarzuelas Under The Stars	Bilingual Foundation of the Arts	2004	
Fiesta del Dia de los Muertos	Bilingual Foundation of the Arts	2004	
Solamente Una Vez/You Belong to my Heart	Bilingual Foundation of the Arts	2003–2004	
Don Quixote: The Last Adventure	Bilingual Foundation of the Arts	2004	
Fiesta del Dia de los Muertos	Bilingual Foundation of the Arts	2004	
New Works Festival	Bilingual Foundation of the Arts	2005	
La Zapatera Prodigiosa/The Shoemaker's Prodigious Wife	Bilingual Foundation of the Arts	2005	
Yerma	Bilingual Foundation of the Arts	2006	
Sucedio en la Habana/It Happened in Havana	Bilingual Foundation of the Arts	2006	
Un Domingo en la Alameda/A Sunday in the Alameda	Bilingual Foundation of the Arts	2006	
Las Leandras	Bilingual Foundation of the Arts	2008	
Erendira	Bilingual Foundation of the Arts	2008	
La Jaula de las Locas	Bilingual Foundation of the Arts	2008	
La Verbena de San Antonio	Bilingual Foundation of the Arts	2008	
Memorias del Tango	Bilingual Foundation of the Arts	2008	Play written by Estela Scarlata.
El Fieston de las Calaveras	Bilingual Foundation of the Arts	2008	
El Bicentenario de la Independencia y centenario de la Revolucion de Mexico	Elysian Park Amphitheatre	2010	
The Immigrant	Elysian Park Amphitheatre	2010–2019	Play written by Estela Scarlata.
Too Many Skeletons	Elysian Park Amphitheatre	2010–2019	Play adapted from La Difunta Familia Diaz
LATA Choir	Elysian Park Amphitheatre, homes of disabled residents of Solano Canyon	2010–2019	Costumes designed and built by Estela Scarlata.
The Lion Sleeps Tonight	Elysian Park Amphitheatre	2010–2019	Play adaptation of the songThe Lion Sleeps Tonight by Estela Scarlata.
Don Quijote de la Mancha	Elysian Park Amphitheatre, Studio Theatre Playhouse	2010–2019	Adaptation by Estela Scarlata.
La Leyenda del Maiz	Elysian Park Amphitheatre	2010–2019	Adaptation by Estela Scarlata.
Sounds of Music	Elysian Park Amphitheatre	2010–2019	Play adaptation of film musical Sounds of Music by Estela Scarlata.
