= Cláudio Botelho =

Brazilian actor, singer, composer, and translator

- Born: 1964 (age 60–61); Araguari, Minas Gerais

Cláudio Botelho (born November 20, 1964) is a Brazilian actor, singer, composer and translator. Side by side with his fellow Charles Möeller, he is esteemed as Brazil's modern "musical theatre wizard".

He was born in Araguari, Minas Gerais.

== Controversy ==
Cláudio Botelho has been involved in controversy surrounding a musical inspired by Chico Buarque which contained critics (inserted by Botelho) to the leaders of Partido dos Trabalhadores – the political party supported by Buarque. The lines inserted by Botelho caused anger in the crowd, which caused Botelho to react defying the public to leave and get their money back. As result, all the public left, the piece was interrupted and never was presented again, since Buarque withdrawed permission to Botelho using his works.

Cláudio Botelho has recently used the social networks to spread hate speech against transgender people. Botelho openly declared that parents should use violence against their transgender children, to stop them from being transgender.

== Works ==
=== Translations to Portuguese (musical theatre/opera) ===
- The Fantasticks (Schmidt & Jones)
- Candide (Leonard Bernstein)
- Kiss of the Spider Woman (Kander & Ebb)
- Die Fledermaus (Johann Strauss)
- Company (Stephen Sondheim)
- Les Misérables (Boulblil & Schonberg)
- Victor or Victoria (Henry Mancini)
- The World Goes Round (Kander & Ebb)
- Sweet Charity (Cy Coleman & Dorothy Fields)
- My Fair Lady (George Bernard Shaw, Frederick Lowe and Alan Jay Lerner)
- The Sound of Music
- West Side Story
- Miss Saigon

== Awards ==
- Mambembe Award (Lifetime Achievement as composer, 1998)
- Governor of the State of Rio de Janeiro Award (Cole Porter versions in Cole Porter – Ele Nunca Disse que me Amava, 2000)
- Nominated for Prêmio Shell for Company
