= Charles Möeller =

Brazilian actor, theatre director, stagecraftsman and costume designer

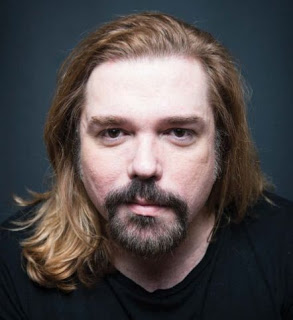
- Möeller, 2015
- Born: April 30, 1967 (age 59); Santos, São Paulo, Brazil
- Occupation: Director of Musical Theater
- Years active: 1988–present

Charles Möeller (born April 30, 1967) is a Brazilian actor, theatre director, stagecraftsman and costume designer. Alongside his fellow Cláudio Botelho, he is regarded as responsible for the revival of the musical theatre in Rio de Janeiro from the middle of the 1990s to present day.

== Works ==
=== Stagecraft and costume designer ===
- O Concílio do Amor
- Boi Voador
- Hello Gershwin (directed by Marco Nanini)
- O Alienista
- Dorotéia (1991)
- De Rosto Colado (1993, directed by Marco Nanini)
- O Médico e o Monstro (1994)
- O Jovem Torless (1995)
- Exorbitâncias, uma Farândula Teatral (1995)
- Os Fantástikos (1996)
- Futuro do Pretérito (1996)
- Na Bagunça do Teu Coração (1997, directed by Bibi Ferreira)
- Volúpia (1997)
- O Casamento (1997)
- Amor de Poeta (1998)
- Auto da Compadecida (1998)
- Gula (1999)
- Os Libertinos (2000)
- Candide (2000)

=== Theatre direction ===
- As Malvadas (1997)
- O Abre Alas (1998)
- Cole Porter - Ele Nunca Disse que Me Amava (2000)
- Company (2001)
- Um Dia de Sol em Shangrilá (2001)
- A Diabólica Moll Flanders (2002)
- O Fantasma do Teatro (2002)
- Suburbano Coração (2002)
- Ópera do Malandro (2003)
- Sweet Charity (2005)
- Lado a Lado com Sondheim (2005)

== Awards ==
- Prêmio Shell of Best Costume Designer for O Casamento (1997)
- Sharp Awards of Best Play for As Malvadas (1997)
