= Rodolfo Hoyos Jr. =

Mexican-American actor (1916–1983)

- Hoyos in Viva Valdez, 1976
- Born: March 14, 1916; Mexico City, Distrito Federal, Mexico
- Died: April 15, 1983 (aged 67); Los Angeles, California, U.S.
- Occupation: Actor
- Years active: 1945–1981

Rodolfo Hoyos Jr. (March 14, 1916 – April 15, 1983) was a Mexican-American film and television actor. He was known for playing the role of Rafael Rosillo in the 1956 film The Brave One.

Hoyos died on April 15, 1983, in Los Angeles, California, at the age of 67.

== Partial filmography ==
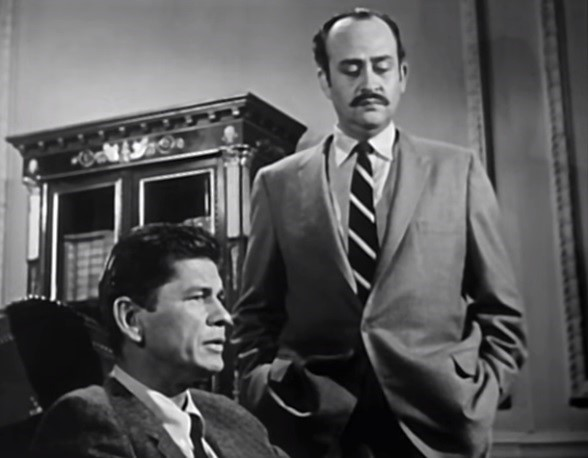
Hoyos (right) with Charles Bronson in Man with a Camera (1958)

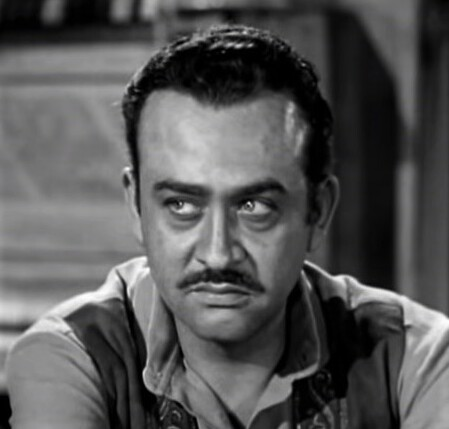
Hoyos in Stories of the Century, 1955

- Masquerade in Mexico (1945) - Bullfight Spectator (uncredited)
- Gilda (1946) - Peasant (uncredited)
- Perilous Holiday (1946) - Castone (uncredited)
- Honeymoon (1947) - Flanner's Friend (uncredited)
- We Were Strangers (1949) - (uncredited)
- The Big Steal (1949) - Customs Inspector (uncredited)
- The Capture (1950) - Baggage Agent (uncredited)
- Crisis - Chauffeur (uncredited)
- A Lady Without Passport (1950) - Policeman (uncredited)
- Raton Pass (1951) - Ben
- Smuggler's Island (1951) - Sikh Policeman (uncredited)
- The Magic Carpet (1951) - Sergeant (uncredited)
- The Fighter (1952) - Alvarado
- Second Chance (1953) - Vasco
- Wings of the Hawk (1953) - Clerk (uncredited)
- Jubilee Trail (1954) - Spaniard (uncredited)
- Gypsy Colt (1954) - Rodolfo
- Secret of the Incas (1954) - (uncredited)
- Green Fire (1954) - Pedro, the Bartender (uncredited)
- The Americano (1955) - Cristino

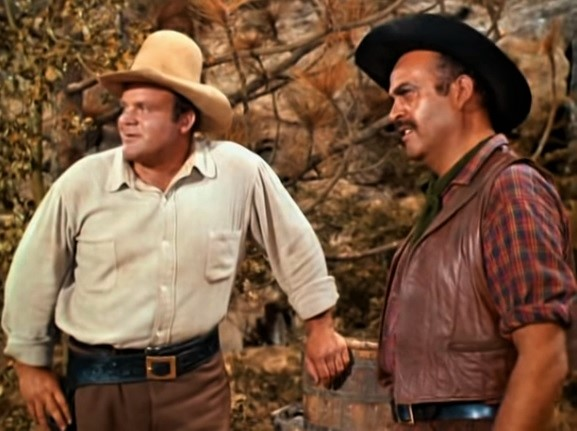
Hoyos (right) with Dan Blocker in Bonanza, 1960

- The Fighting Chance (1955) - Rico
- Time Table (1956) - Lt. Castro
- The Three Outlaws (1956) - El Gallo
- Secret of Treasure Mountain (1956) - Francisco Martinez
- The First Texan (1956) - Col. Cos
- The Brave One (1956) - Rafael Rosillo
- Stagecoach to Fury (1956) - Lorenzo Gracia
- Duel at Apache Wells (1957) - Jose Galindo (uncredited)
- Ghost Diver (1957) - Papa Rico - the Diver
- Gun Battle at Monterey (1957) - Posseman (uncredited)
- The Toughest Gun in Tombstone (1958) - Col. Emillo
- Crash Landing (1958) - Carlos Ortega (uncredited)
- Villa!! (1958) - Pancho Villa
- Ten Days to Tulara (1958) - Cesar
- Zane Grey Theater Episode "Interrogator""(1959) as Gonzales
- Zane Grey Theater Episode "The Last Raid" (1959) as gang member Torres
- The Little Savage (1959) - Captain Taursus
- The Miracle (1959) - Cafe Manager (uncredited)
- Have Gun – Will Travel (1960) S2 E19 "The Monster" - Don Hernandez (spelled "Rudolfo" in credits).
- Zane Grey Theater Episode "The Last Bugle" (1960) as Commandante
- Wanted Dead or Alive S3 E14 "Witch Woman" (1960) - Don Emilio Flores
- The Rifleman S2 E31 "The Prodigal" (1960) - Luis
- Operation Eichmann (1961) - Sanchez (uncredited)
- The Alfred Hitchcock Hour (1963) (Season 1 Episode 21: "I'll Be Judge - I'll Be Jury") - Inspector Ortiz
- California (1963) - Padre Soler
- The Gun Hawk (1963) - Miguel
- A Global Affair (1964) - Spanish Delegate (uncredited)
- Seven Days in May (1964) - Captain Ortega (uncredited)
- Madame X (1966) - Patrone (uncredited)
- El Dorado (1966) - Bit Part (uncredited)
- Return of the Gunfighter (1966) - Luis Domingo
- Rango (1967 TV series) - Gomez (Episode: "In a Little Mexican Town")
- Change of Habit (1969) - Mr. Hernandez
- That Girl (1970) season 5 episode 12 "That Señorita" as Rudy Sanchez
- Moonfire (1970) - Pedro
- The Resurrection of Zachary Wheeler (1971) - Medina
- Adam-12 (1972) season 5 episode 11 "Hot Spell" as Fred Tosca
- Viva Valdez (1976 TV series) - Luis Valdez (12 episodes)
- Love & Money (1981) - Gen. Sanzer
