= Tony Mordente =

American actor (1935–2024)

- Undated publicity photo
- Born: Anthony Charles Mordente Jr. December 3, 1935; New York City, U.S.
- Died: June 11, 2024 (aged 88); Henderson, Nevada, U.S.
- Occupations: Dancer; choreographer; television director; actor
- Years active: 1961–2003
- Spouse(s): Chita Rivera (m. 1957; div. 1966) Jean Fraser (m. 1978)
- Children: 2 (including Lisa Mordente)

Anthony Charles Mordente Jr. (December 3, 1935 – June 11, 2024) was an American actor, dancer, choreographer, and television director.

== Early life and career ==
Born in Brooklyn, the son of a beer truck driver, Mordente went to dance school at the age of thirteen. He attended the High School of Performing Arts and won a scholarship to the American Ballet Theater School. There, he was discovered by the choreographer Michael Kidd, who cast him as Lonesome Polecat in the 1956 Broadway musical adaptation of the Al Capp comic strip Li'l Abner.

Mordente was then featured in the Broadway (1957) and West End productions and film version of West Side Story, during which time he met his future wife Chita Rivera, who played Anita in the original Broadway cast. In the stage version Mordente played A-Rab, and in the film he played Action. "He wanted to play his original role in the movie and was very disappointed to be Action and I asked why they switched his role," Seth Rudetsky wrote in Playbill. "He said he never asked because sometimes you ask and you don’t like the answer. Regardless, he wound up being very featured in the movie."

Rudetsky said the actors told him that the Broadway cast had specific instructions that the Sharks and Jets were not allowed to fraternize. "Well, not only did [Rivera] fraternize with a Jet (Tony Mordente), they wound up having a daughter (Lisa Mordente)! Chita remembers seeing Tony in rehearsal and feeling like he literally flew."

Mordente was the voice of Oliver Cool on the 45 rpm single recording, "Oliver Cool" b/w "I Like Girls" by Oliver Cool (Roulette R-4292). The record did not nationally reach any musical hit parade in the US, but was a big hit in Australia in 1961.

He understudied the title role and served as assistant to Gower Champion in Bye Bye Birdie (1960) He next teamed again with Kidd for Ben Franklin in Paris (1964) and the ill-fated Breakfast at Tiffany's (1966), which closed during previews. He received his first credit as sole choreographer for Here's Where I Belong (1968), which never made it past opening night.

As an actor, Mordente had guest appearances on the tv series Combat! and The Outer Limits. He began to choreograph for television variety shows, including The Ed Sullivan Show and The Sonny & Cher Comedy Hour.

Mordente began to direct for television in the mid-1970s. His credits include twenty-nine episodes of Rhoda, ten episodes of Matlock, thirty-seven episodes of Walker, Texas Ranger, five episodes of The A-Team, four episodes of The Love Boat, and thirty-three episodes of 7th Heaven, in addition to episodes of The Practice (1976), Busting Loose, Love, Sidney, Family Ties, Day by Day, M*A*S*H, and Burke's Law, among other television shows.

== Personal life ==
From 1957 to 1966, Mordente was married to Chita Rivera. Their daughter is actress Lisa Mordente, who received a best actress Tony nomination in 1982 for the musical Marlowe. Mordente and Rivera divorced but remained on good terms. Mordente married Jean G. Fraser in 1978. They were parents to screenwriter Adriana Mordente. He lived in Henderson, Nevada.

Mordente died following a brief illness on June 11, 2024, at the age of 88. His death occurred less than 5 months after his ex-wife, Chita Rivera.
