= The Visit (musical) =

Musical

- Original Broadway Playbill
- Music: John Kander
- Lyrics: Fred Ebb
- Book: Terrence McNally
- Basis: The Visit by Friedrich Dürrenmatt adapted by Maurice Valency
- Productions: 2001 Chicago; 2008 Arlington; 2015 Broadway

The Visit is a musical with a book by Terrence McNally, lyrics by Fred Ebb, and music by John Kander.

Based on Friedrich Dürrenmatt's 1956 satirical play about greed and revenge Der Besuch der alten Dame, it focuses on the world's wealthiest woman, Claire Zachanassian, who returns to her financially depressed hometown and offers its residents a new lease on life in exchange for the murder of Anton Schell, the man who abandoned her years ago.

== Background ==
The musical adaptation of The Visit was originally developed as a vehicle for Angela Lansbury and was scheduled for a Broadway opening on March 15, 2001. It had been scheduled for a try-out in Boston for December 2000–January 2001. Frank Galati was the director with Ann Reinking as choreographer, and co-starring Philip Bosco. However, in July 2000 Lansbury withdrew due to the illness and subsequent death of her husband.

== Production history ==
=== Chicago, 2001 ===
Chita Rivera was signed as Lansbury's replacement and the musical, directed by Frank Galati and choreographed by Ann Reinking, was staged with Rivera and John McMartin by the Goodman Theatre, Chicago, opening on October 1, 2001. Galati said that because of the September 11, 2001 attacks the show did not move to Broadway: "It was generally a success, but we couldn't get anyone from New York or California to see it. People weren't flying." In that climate, he says, "the whole idea of moving a very dark parable about human greed, the dark side of human nature," was difficult. Reinking said: "By the time you really could travel and people felt safe again, our run was up." Regional theatre productions were considered as an alternative, while McNally rewrote the book. Then, in late 2003, The Public Theater announced it was mounting an off-Broadway production with Rivera and Frank Langella early the following year, but that too was cancelled when financing fell through.

=== Signature Theatre, 2008 ===
The Signature Theatre in Arlington, Virginia production of The Visit, began previews on May 13, 2008, officially opened on May 27 and ran through June 22. With direction by Frank Galati and choreography by Ann Reinking, Rivera was once again in the lead, with co-stars George Hearn and Mark Jacoby. Prior to this production, a closed reading was held on February 19, 2008, with, among others, Jayne Houdyshell, Florence Lacey, and Jason Danieley, joining Rivera, Hearn and Mark Jacoby.

=== Concert, on Broadway, 2011 ===
On November 30, 2011, Rivera and John Cullum, directed by Carl Andress, starred in a stage concert at the Ambassador Theatre, presented by The Actors Fund and The Vineyard Theatre.

=== Williamstown Theatre Festival, 2014 ===
A one-act version appeared at the Williamstown Theatre Festival, (Massachusetts) running from July 31, 2014, to August 17. The cast featured Chita Rivera, Jason Danieley, Judy Kuhn, Roger Rees, Diana DiMarzio, David Garrison, Michelle Veintimilla and Rick Holmes, with direction by John Doyle and choreography by Graciela Daniele. Music direction was by David Loud, who has served as music director for each incarnation of the show.

=== Broadway, 2015 ===
The "one-act" version of The Visit which was presented at the Williamstown Theatre Festival began Broadway previews on March 26, 2015, and premiered on Broadway at the Lyceum Theatre on April 23, 2015. Chita Rivera and Roger Rees, in his final stage performance, starred, with direction by John Doyle and choreography by Graciela Daniele. The production closed on June 14, 2015. Tom Nelis took over the role of Anton when Rees became ill.

== Synopsis ==
=== Act I ===
"The citizens of Brachen are awaiting the visit of their very own Claire Wascher, now Claire Zachanassian, the oft-widowed, richest woman in the world. It's been a lifetime's absence during which they have fallen into utter bankruptcy. In anticipation of this visit, Anton Shell, a once prosperous shop keeper, remembers himself and Claire as young lovers ("Prelude"). The Mayor and the School Master have prepared a special welcome for their distinguished visitor ("Out of the Darkness"). All Brachen marvels at their visitor's glamorous, bejeweled presence ("At Last"). Claire explains the reason for it ("I Walk Away"). Her warm greeting to Anton makes the Mayor realize that Anton is the key to asking Claire to relieve them from their misery. Anton is confident he can ("I Know Claire"). He leaves to rendezvous with Claire and their old trysting place, Konrad's Village Wood, while the others exult in their good fortune. Only the School Master has forebodings about her visit ("A Happy Ending"). Alone in the woods, the two old lovers and their younger selves reminisce ("You, You, You"). Anton is convinced that she will be their salvation ("I Must Have Been Something"). Everyone prepares for the gala banquet that evening at the Golden Apostle Hotel in Claire's honor ("Look at Me"). The Mayor and the citizens tell Claire of their inexplicable decline from prosperity to utter bankruptcy ("A Masque"). Claire then recounts her version of events, which differs considerably from theirs ("Eunuch's Testimony"). In exchange for rescuing them from financial calamity, she asks for the life of Anton Shell ("Winter"). The Mayor expresses outrage but the seeds have been planted, and the citizens begin making purchases at Anton's store on credit ("Yellow Shoes").

=== Act II ===
Claire reveals that it is she herself who destroyed Brachen's once booming economy ("A Confession"). She is resolute in her terms: Anton's death. Claire's entourage, her Butler and two Eunuchs, swear eternal fealty to her ("I Would Never Leave You"). Alone in the attic above his shop, Anton wrestles with his fears ("Back and Forth"). The School Master visits Anton and tells him how the village is turning against him ("The Only One"). Anton struggles with his conscience ("Fear"). Embracing his fate and at peace with himself, he invites family for a drive in his son's new automobile, bought, like everything else in Brachen now, on credit ("A Car Ride"). Knowing Anton will join her in their old trysting place, Claire reflects on the incidents that have brought her to this moment in her life ("Love and Love Alone"). The lovers meet for a last time to discuss their whole past, including a child who died, before the town meeting that will decide Anton's fate ("In the Forest Again"). Agreeing to the terms, the townspeople murder Anton, with the town doctor recording that he "died of joy." The visit over, Claire tells her butler, "Rudi, get the bags packed. We are going to Capri" ("Finale").

== Song list ==
From the 2008 Signature Theatre production

Act I

- "Out of the Darkness" — Townspeople
- "At Last" — Claire, Townspeople
- "I Walk Away" — Claire, Entourage
- "I Know Claire" — Anton
- "A Happy Ending" — Mayor, Policeman, Doctor, Priest, Schoolmaster, Townspeople
- "You, You, You" — Anton, Claire
- "I Must Have Been Something" — Anton
- "Look at Me" — Anton, Claire, Entourage, Eunuchs, Rudi, Young Anton, Young Claire, Family
- "A Masque" — Mayor, Townspeople
- "Testimony" — Louis, Jacob
- "Winter" — Claire
- "Yellow Shoes" — Townspeople

Act II

- "Chorale" — Townspeople
- "A Confession" — Claire, Entourage
- "I Would Never Leave You" — Entourage, Claire
- "The One-Legged Tango" — Entourage, Claire
- "Back and Forth" — Matilda, Ottillie, Karl
- "The Only One" — Schoolmaster
- "Fear" — Anton
- "A Car Ride" — Anton, Matilda, Ottillie, Karl
- "Winter (reprise)" — Young Anton
- "Love and Love Alone" — Claire
- "In the Forest Again" — Anton, Claire
- "Finale" — Townspeople

From the One Act 2015 Broadway Production

- "Prelude"
- "Out of the Darkness" — Townspeople
- "At Last" — Claire, Townspeople
- "I Walk Away" — Claire, Louis Perch, Jacob Chicken, Rudi
- "I Know Claire" — Anton
- "A Happy Ending" — Mayor, Priest, Doctor, Police Chief, School Master, Townspeople
- "You, You, You" — Anton, Claire
- "I Must Have Been Something" — Anton
- "Look at Me" — Claire, Anton, Young Claire, Young Anton
- "A Masque" — Mayor, Townspeople
- "Eunuch's Testimony" — Jacob Chicken, Louis Perch
- "Winter" — Claire
- "Yellow Shoes" — Doctor, Townspeople
- "A Confession" — Claire, All
- "I Would Never Leave You" — Rudi, Louis Perch, Jacob Chicken, Claire
- "Back and Forth" — Matilda, Ottillie, Karl
- "The Only One" — Frederich Kuhn
- "Fear" — Anton
- "A Car Ride" — Anton, Matilda, Karl, Ottillie, Young Anton, Young Claire
- "Love and Love Alone" — Claire
- "In the Forest Again" — Anton, Claire, Young Anton, Young Claire
- "Finale" — Townspeople

== Critical reaction ==
In reviewing the 2008 Signature Theatre production, Peter Marks of The Washington Post wrote that it is an "admirable if not consistently embraceable musical", and that it "comes across as something short of electrifying with the addition of song and dance." He wrote that the score is"...a melodically cohesive web of Middle European waltzes and choral numbers that befit the cynical strands in the story and the formality of Swiss society." Paul Harris of Variety wrote that it "offers much to admire, starting with an abundance of enjoyable melodies and clever lyrics from K&E...The radiant [Chita] Rivera offers a stylish performance as the aloof Claire, a woman eager to heap disdain on everyone she meets while guardedly avoiding remorse over the dirty plot against her only true love. She handles song and dance assignments with equal aplomb...[George] Hearn is equally credible...In its reincarnation, there is sufficient vitality, intrigue and entertaining music to make for a most satisfying "Visit."

Reviews of the 2015 Broadway production were mixed. Ben Brantley of The New York Times praised Rivera's "command of the stage and her ability to find a concerto of feelings in what might have been a single-note role", and a score that "at its best has the flavor of darkest chocolate", but wrote that the musical "only rarely shakes off a stasis that suggests a carefully carved mausoleum frieze", and that its "blending of bitter and sweet isn’t easily digested".

== Awards and nominations ==
=== Original Broadway production ===
Year	Award ceremony	Category	Nominee	Result
2015	Tony Award	Best Musical		Nominated
2015	Tony Award	Best Book of a Musical	Terrence McNally	Nominated
2015	Tony Award	Best Original Score	John Kander and Fred Ebb	Nominated
2015	Tony Award	Best Performance by a Leading Actress in a Musical	Chita Rivera	Nominated
2015	Tony Award	Best Lighting of a Musical	Japhy Weideman	Nominated
2015	Drama Desk Award	Outstanding Musical		Nominated
2015	Drama Desk Award	Outstanding Book of a Musical	Terrence McNally	Nominated
2015	Drama Desk Award	Outstanding Actress in a Musical	Chita Rivera	Nominated
2015	Drama Desk Award	Outstanding Director of a Musical	John Doyle	Nominated
2015	Drama Desk Award	Outstanding Lyrics	Fred Ebb	Nominated
2015	Drama Desk Award	Outstanding Music	John Kander	Nominated
2015	Drama Desk Award	Outstanding Set Design	Scott Pask	Nominated
2015	Outer Critics Circle Award	Outstanding New Broadway Musical		Nominated
2015	Outer Critics Circle Award	Outstanding Book of a Musical	Terrence McNally	Nominated
2015	Outer Critics Circle Award	Outstanding New Score	John Kander and Fred Ebb	Nominated
2015	Outer Critics Circle Award	Outstanding Actress in a Play	Chita Rivera	Nominated
2015	Outer Critics Circle Award	Outstanding Lighting Design	Japhy Weideman	Nominated
2015	Drama League Award	Distinguished Production of a Musical		Nominated
2015	Drama League Award	Distinguished Performance	Roger Rees	Nominated
2015	Drama League Award	Distinguished Performance	Chita Rivera	Won
