= The First (musical) =

- Broadway Playbill cover
- Music: Robert Brush
- Lyrics: Martin Charnin
- Book: Joel Siegel
- Basis: Life of Jackie Robinson
- Productions: 1981 Broadway

The First is a musical with a book by critic Joel Siegel. The music was composed by Robert Brush, and Martin Charnin wrote the lyrics. The show is based on the life of Brooklyn Dodgers second baseman Jackie Robinson, the first African-American to play major league baseball in the 20th century.

The musical premiered on Broadway at the Martin Beck Theatre on November 17, 1981 and closed on December 12, 1981 after 31 performances and 33 previews (although often erroneously reported as having 37 performances). Charnin has said that despite "stellar reviews," the musical failed to secure one: that of Frank Rich of The New York Times, "which at the time meant everything." Directed by Charnin and choreographed by Alan Johnson, the original cast included David Alan Grier as Jackie Robinson, and Lonette McKee as his wife Rachel.

== Songs ==
Act I

- Jack Roosevelt Robinson
- The National Pastime
- Will We Ever Know Each Other
- The First
- Bloat
- It Ain't Gonna Work
- The Brooklyn Dodger Strike
- Jack Roosevelt Robinson (Reprise)
- The First (Reprise)

Act 2

- Is This Year Next Year?
- You Do-Do-Do-It Good
- Is This Year Next Year? (Reprise)
- There Are Days and There Are Days
- It's A Beginning
- The Opera Ain't Over

== Awards and nominations ==
=== Original Broadway production ===
Year	Award ceremony	Category	Nominee	Result
1982	Tony Award	Best Book of a Musical	Martin Charnin and Joel Siegel	Nominated
1982	Tony Award	Best Featured Actor in a Musical	David Alan Grier	Nominated
1982	Tony Award	Best Direction of a Musical	Martin Charnin	Nominated
1982	Drama Desk Award	Outstanding Featured Actress in a Musical	Lonette McKee	Nominated
1982	Drama Desk Award	Outstanding Set Design	David Chapman	Nominated
1982	Theatre World Award		David Alan Grier	Won
