= Marlowe (musical) =

- Music: Jimmy Horowitz
- Lyrics: Leo Rost
- Book: Jimmy Horowitz; Leo Rost
- Basis: Biography of Christopher Marlowe
- Productions: 1981 Broadway

Marlowe is a 1981 musical with a book by Leo Rost, lyrics by Rost and Jimmy Horowitz, and music by Horowitz. Despite a claim in the Playbill that "the story of this drama is essentially true and accurate," much of it is a fictionalized account of the life of Elizabethan playwright Christopher Marlowe.

== Background ==
While the plot refers to his rebellious anti-clerical views, the main focus is on Marlowe's romantic relationship with Emelia Bossano, a woman he supposedly lured away from William Shakespeare. Other historical figures who put in an appearance are Richard Burbage, Matthew Parker, Ingram Frizer, and Queen Elizabeth I.

In keeping with the general rock music tone of the score, neither the set nor costume designs (miniskirts, Day-Glo tights and silver lamé jumpsuits) suggested the show was a period piece, although the action is set in 1593.

== Original cast and characters ==
Character	Broadway (1981)
Christopher Marlowe	Patrick Jude
Emelia Bossano	Lisa Mordente
William Shakespeare	Lennie Del Duca, Jr.
Audrey Walsingham	Debra Greenfield
Ingram Frizer	Robert Rosen
Elizabeth I	Margaret Warncke
Richard Burbage	John Henry Kurtz
Captain Townsend	Steve Hall
Archbishop Parker	Raymond Serra

== Songs ==
Act I

- "Rocking The Boat - Parker, Queen, Townsend, Chorus
- "Because I'm a Woman - Emilia, Shakespeare, Burbage
- "Live For The Moment - Marlowe, Chorus
- "Emelia - Shakespeare, Marlowe
- "I'm Coming Round' To Your Point of View - Marlowe, Emelia
- "The Ends Justify The Means - Frizer, Audrey
- "Higher Than High - Company
- "Rocking The Boat (reprise) - Company

Act II

- "Christopher - Emelia, Chorus
- "So Do I (Ode To Virginity) - Burbage, Chorus
- "Two Lovers - Emelia
- "The Funeral Dirge - Company
- "Live For The Moment (reprise) - Emelia, Marlowe
- "Emelia (reprise) - Marlowe, Emelia
- "Christopher (reprise) - Emelia, Shakespeare, Chorus
- "The Madrigal Blues - Marlowe, Company

== Productions ==
The Broadway production was directed and choreographed by Don Price. The musical opened at the Rialto Theatre on October 12, 1981, and ran for 48 performances and 8 previews. Mordente was nominated for the Tony Award for Best Performance by a Leading Actress in a Musical.

While the production stopped performances after Sunday, November 22, 1981, the box office remained open, in the hopes that more tickets would be sold for the future. On December 1, the box office closed.

== Critical reception ==
In his review in The New York Times, Frank Rich described Marlowe as "a wholly ridiculous show that is much more fun to sit through than many merely mediocre musicals . . . If Marlowe isn't quite a classic of its kind, that's a matter of size, not content. Tacky-looking and sparsely populated, this show lacks the Titaniclike splendor and expenditure of Broadway's all-time fabulous wrecks."
