= Lisa Mordente =

American actress, singer, and dancer (born 1958)

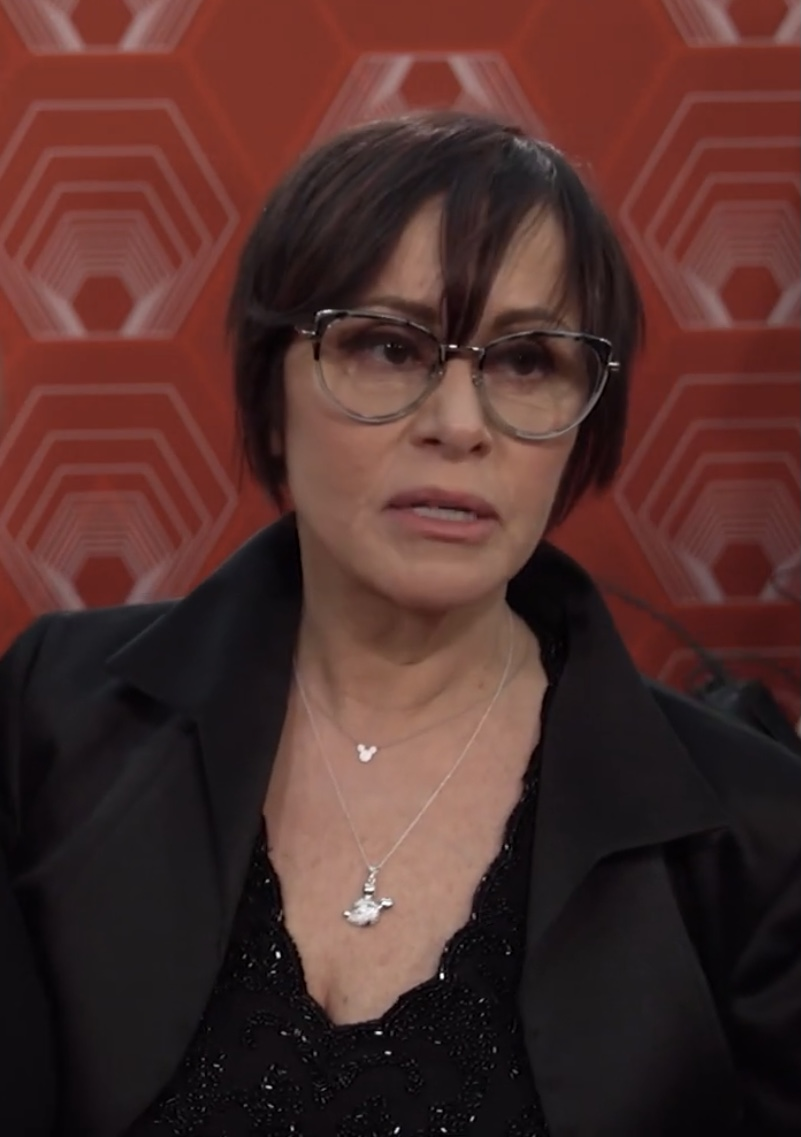
- Mordente in 2021
- Born: July 30, 1958 (age 66); New Hyde Park, New York, U.S.
- Occupation(s): Actress, singer, dancer
- Spouse(s): Donnie Kehr (m. 1993; div. ????)
- Parent(s): Tony Mordente; Chita Rivera

Lisa Mordente (born July 30, 1958) is an American actress, singer, and dancer.

== Life ==
Born in the Long Island village of New Hyde Park, to choreographer and television director Tony Mordente and actress/dancer Chita Rivera (her birth postponed her mother's opening in the West End production of West Side Story), Mordente made her Broadway debut opposite Alexis Smith in the short-lived 1978 musical Platinum. Marlowe (1981) was equally unsuccessful, but garnered her a nomination for the Tony Award for Best Performance by a Leading Actress in a Musical. She also was assistant to the choreographer for the 1993 production of The Who's Tommy, where she met performer Donnie Kehr, whom she married and later divorced.

Mordente's television credits include a regular role on the 1976 summer series Viva Valdez and guest appearances on Starsky and Hutch, Welcome Back, Kotter, Chico and the Man, The Cosby Show, C.P.O. Sharkey and The A-Team. She served as choreographer for the movies The End and Sister Act.

Mordente also sang a duet with Adam Sandler called "Crazy Love" on his 1996 What the Hell Happened to Me? comedy album.
