= 57th Tony Awards =

2003 US theatrical awards ceremony

- Official poster for the 57th annual Tony Awards
- Date: June 8, 2003
- Location: Radio City Music Hall, New York City, New York
- Hosted by: Hugh Jackman

Highlights
- Most wins: Hairspray (8)
- Most nominations: Hairspray (13)
- Website: tonyawards.com

Television/radio coverage
- Network: CBS
- Viewership: 7.8 million
- Produced by: Ricky Kirshner; Gary Smith
- Directed by: Glenn Weiss

The 57th Annual Tony Awards was held at Radio City Music Hall on June 8, 2003, and broadcast by CBS television. The event was hosted for the first time by Australian actor Hugh Jackman.

== Eligibility ==
Shows that opened on Broadway during the 2002–03 season before May 7, 2003 are eligible.

Original plays

- Enchanted April
- Hollywood Arms
- Imaginary Friends
- Life x 3
- Say Goodnight, Gracie
- Take Me Out
- Vincent in Brixton

Original musicals

- Amour
- Dance of the Vampires
- Hairspray
- The Look of Love
- Movin' Out
- Urban Cowboy
- A Year with Frog and Toad

Play revivals

- A Day in the Death of Joe Egg
- Dinner at Eight
- Frankie and Johnny in the Clair de Lune
- I'm Not Rappaport
- Long Day's Journey into Night
- Ma Rainey's Black Bottom
- Medea
- Our Town
- Salome
- Tartuffe

Musical revivals

- The Boys from Syracuse
- Flower Drum Song
- Gypsy
- La bohème
- Man of La Mancha
- Nine

== The ceremony ==
The ceremony was broadcast on national prime time television on CBS for three hours, rather than two hours on CBS and one hour on PBS, as had been done for several years previously. The television ratings were 5.4, down slightly from the 2002 telecast of 5.9. During the ceremony, at the end of their acceptance speech for Hairspray, Marc Shaiman and Scott Wittman kissed each other, making them the first public same-sex kiss at an awards show, predating Britney Spears and Madonna at the MTV Video Music Awards.

Presenters included: Benjamin Bratt, Toni Braxton, Matthew Broderick, Alan Cumming, Edie Falco, Joey Fatone, Laurence Fishburne, Sutton Foster, Danny Glover, Melanie Griffith, Frank Langella, John Leguizamo, John Lithgow, Julianna Margulies, Bebe Neuwirth, Sarah Jessica Parker, Rosie Perez, Lynn Redgrave, Vanessa Redgrave, Christopher Reeve, Ann Reinking, John Spencer, Marisa Tomei, Mike Wallace and Barbara Walters. In addition, Jason Alexander and Martin Short, the stars of the national company of The Producers, presented an award from the stage of Pantages Theatre in Los Angeles.

There were memorial tributes to cartoonist Al Hirschfeld, writer Peter Stone, and lyricist Adolph Green.

Shows that performed were:

New Musicals:

- Movin' Out - Billy Joel opened by performing "New York State of Mind" live from Times Square, leading to a medley of "River of Dreams", "Keeping the Faith" and "Only the Good Die Young" performed by the company of Movin' Out on stage at Radio City Music Hall.
- Hairspray - Marissa Jaret Winokur, Matthew Morrison, Kerry Butler, Harvey Fierstein, and Mary Bond Davis led the company with "You Can't Stop the Beat"
- A Year with Frog and Toad - Mark Linn-Baker and Jay Goede performed "Alone"

Revivals:

- Nine - Antonio Banderas performed "Guido's Song" with the company
- La bohème - The company (including all 10 members of the principal ensemble) performed a medley from the opera
- Gypsy - Bernadette Peters performed "Rose's Turn"
- Man of La Mancha - Brian Stokes Mitchell performed "The Impossible Dream (The Quest)" with Mary Elizabeth Mastrantonio

== Awards and nominees ==
Winners are in bold

Source:The New York Times

Best Play	Best Musical
**Take Me Out – Richard Greenberg**; Enchanted April – Matthew Barber; Say Goodnight, Gracie – Rupert Holmes; Vincent in Brixton – Nicholas Wright	**Hairspray**; Amour; A Year with Frog and Toad; Movin' Out
Best Revival of a Play	Best Revival of a Musical
**Long Day's Journey into Night**; A Day in the Death of Joe Egg; Dinner at Eight; Frankie and Johnny in the Clair de Lune	**Nine**; Gypsy; La bohème; Man of La Mancha
Best Performance by a Leading Actor in a Play	Best Performance by a Leading Actress in a Play
**Brian Dennehy – Long Day's Journey into Night as James Tyrone, Sr.**; Brian Bedford – Tartuffe as Orgon; Eddie Izzard – A Day in the Death of Joe Egg as Bri; Paul Newman – Our Town as Stage Manager; Stanley Tucci – Frankie and Johnny in the Clair de Lune as Johnny	**Vanessa Redgrave – Long Day's Journey into Night as Mary Tyrone**; Jayne Atkinson – Enchanted April as Lotty Wilton; Victoria Hamilton – A Day in the Death of Joe Egg as Sheila; Clare Higgins – Vincent in Brixton as Ursula Loyler; Fiona Shaw – Medea as Medea
Best Performance by a Leading Actor in a Musical	Best Performance by a Leading Actress in a Musical
**Harvey Fierstein – Hairspray as Edna Turnblad**; Antonio Banderas – Nine as Guido Contini; Malcolm Gets – Amour as Dusoleil; Brian Stokes Mitchell – Man of La Mancha as Don Quixote/Cervantes; John Selya – Movin' Out as Eddie	**Marissa Jaret Winokur – Hairspray as Tracy Turnblad**; Melissa Errico – Amour as Isabella; Mary Elizabeth Mastrantonio – Man of La Mancha as Aldonza/Dulcinea; Elizabeth Parkinson – Movin' Out as Brenda; Bernadette Peters – Gypsy as Mama Rose
Best Performance by a Featured Actor in a Play	Best Performance by a Featured Actress in a Play
**Denis O'Hare – Take Me Out as Mason Marzak**; Thomas Jefferson Byrd – Ma Rainey's Black Bottom as Toledo; Philip Seymour Hoffman – Long Day's Journey into Night as Jamie; Robert Sean Leonard – Long Day's Journey into Night as Edmund; Daniel Sunjata – Take Me Out as Darren Lemming	**Michele Pawk – Hollywood Arms as Louise**; Christine Ebersole – Dinner at Eight as Millicent Jordan; Linda Emond – Life x 3 as Inez; Kathryn Meisle – Tartuffe as Elmire; Marian Seldes – Dinner at Eight as Carlotta Vance
Best Performance by a Featured Actor in a Musical	Best Performance by a Featured Actress in a Musical
**Dick Latessa – Hairspray as Wilbur Turnblad**; Michael Cavanaugh – Movin' Out as Various Characters; John Dossett – Gypsy as Herbie; Corey Reynolds – Hairspray as Seaweed J. Stubbs; Keith Roberts – Movin' Out as Tony	**Jane Krakowski – Nine as Carla Albanese**; Tammy Blanchard – Gypsy as Louise; Mary Stuart Masterson – Nine as Luisa Contini; Chita Rivera – Nine as Liliane La Fleur; Ashley Tuttle – Movin' Out as Judy
Best Book of a Musical	Best Original Score (Music and/or Lyrics) Written for the Theatre
**Mark O'Donnell and Thomas Meehan – Hairspray**; Didier van Cauwelaert and Jeremy Sams – Amour; Willie Reale – A Year with Frog and Toad; David Henry Hwang – Flower Drum Song	**Hairspray – Marc Shaiman (music) and Scott Wittman and Shaiman (lyrics)**; A Year with Frog and Toad – Robert Reale (music) and Willie Reale (lyrics); Amour – Michel Legrand (music) and Didier van Cauwelaert and Jeremy Sams (lyrics); Urban Cowboy – Various Composers^{[I]}
Best Scenic Design	Best Costume Design
**Catherine Martin – La bohème**; John Lee Beatty – Dinner at Eight; Santo Loquasto – Long Day's Journey into Night; David Rockwell – Hairspray	**William Ivey Long – Hairspray**; Gregg Barnes – Flower Drum Song; Catherine Martin and Angus Strathie – La bohème; Catherine Zuber – Dinner at Eight
Best Lighting Design	Best Orchestrations
**Nigel Levings – La bohème**; Donald Holder – Movin' Out; Brian MacDevitt – Nine; Kenneth Posner – Hairspray	**Billy Joel and Stuart Malina – Movin' Out**; Nicholas Kitsopoulos – La bohème; Jonathan Tunick – Nine; Harold Wheeler – Hairspray
Best Direction of a Play	Best Direction of a Musical
**Joe Mantello – Take Me Out**; Laurence Boswell – A Day in the Death of Joe Egg; Robert Falls – Long Day's Journey into Night; Deborah Warner – Medea	**Jack O'Brien – Hairspray**; David Leveaux – Nine; Baz Luhrmann – La bohème; Twyla Tharp – Movin' Out
Best Choreography
**Twyla Tharp – Movin' Out**; Robert Longbottom – Flower Drum Song; Jerry Mitchell – Hairspray; Melinda Roy – Urban Cowboy

== Special awards ==
Tony Honors for Excellence in Theatre

- The principal ensemble of La bohème, including Lisa Hopkins, Ekaterina Solovyeva and Wei Huang (as Mimi); David Miller, Jesús Garcia and Alfie Boe (as Rodolfo); Jessica Comeau and Chlöe Wright (as Musetta); and Eugene Brancoveanu and Ben Davis (as Marcello)
- Paul Huntley
- Johnson-Liff Casting Associates
- The Acting Company

Lifetime Achievement Tony Award

- Cy Feuer

Special Theatrical Event

- Russell Simmons' Def Poetry Jam on Broadway

Regional Theatre Tony Award

- Children's Theatre Company (Minneapolis, MN)

== Multiple nominations and awards ==
These productions had multiple nominations:

- 13 nominations: Hairspray
- 10 nominations: Movin' Out
- 8 nominations: Nine
- 7 nominations: La bohème and Long Day's Journey into Night
- 5 nominations: Amour and Dinner at Eight
- 4 nominations: A Day in the Death of Joe Egg, Gypsy and Take Me Out
- 3 nominations: Flower Drum Song, Man of La Mancha and A Year with Frog and Toad
- 2 nominations: Enchanted April, Frankie and Johnny in the Clair de Lune, Medea, Tartuffe, Urban Cowboy and Vincent in Brixton

The following productions received multiple awards.

- 8 wins: Hairspray
- 3 wins: La bohème, Long Day's Journey into Night and Take Me Out
- 2 wins: Movin' Out and Nine

== See also ==
- Drama Desk Awards
- 2003 Laurence Olivier Awards – equivalent awards for West End theatre productions
- Obie Award
- New York Drama Critics' Circle
- Theatre World Award
- Lucille Lortel Awards

== Notes ==
^{^[I]}The thirty composers nominated for Urban Cowboy were Jeff Blumenkrantz, Bob Stillman, Jason Robert Brown, Danny Arena, Sara Light, Lauren Lucas, Jerry Silverstein, Martie Maguire, Wayland D. Holyfield, Bob Lee House, Carl L. Byrd, Pevin Byrd-Munoz, Luke Reed, Roger Brown, Jerry Chesnut, Marcus Hummon, Clint Black, James Hayden Nicholas, Tommy Conners, Skip Ewing, Charles Daniels, Tom Crain, Fred Edwards, Taz DiGregorio, Jim Marshall, Charlie Hayward, Wanda Mallette, Patti Ryan, Ronnie Dunn and Bob Morrison.
