= Julio Agustin =

American actor and director

Julio Agustín
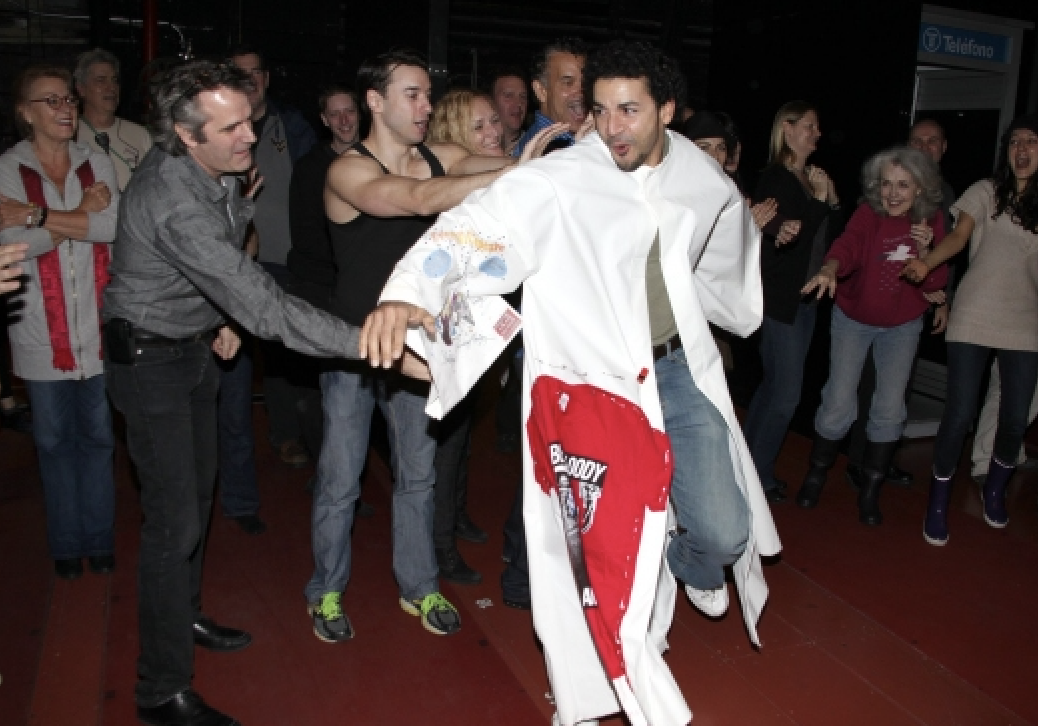
- Born: Bronx, New York, U.S.
- Education: BM in Musical Theater at Florida State University; MFA in Directing at Pennsylvania State University
- Occupations: Actor-Singer-Dancer; Director-Choreographer; Author; Career Coach
- Website: www.julioagustin.com

Julio Agustín (born Julio Agustín Matos, Jr) is an American theatrical multihyphenate (i.e. actor, director, choreographer, author, career coach) and recipient of the Broadway Legacy Robe. He performed in the original Broadway companies of Fosse, Women on the Verge of a Nervous Breakdown starring Patti LuPone, Steel Pier, Never Gonna Dance, the revival of Bells Are Ringing, and was featured opposite Bebe Neuwirth in Chicago (musical). He's appeared in the movies Center Stage and The Producers and is active in voice overs, commercials, and commercial print. In addition to his extensive work as a Broadway performer, he is an award-nominated director/choreographer.

He is the author of The Professional Actor's Handbook: From Casting Call to Curtain Call (2nd edition) and "Navigating the Industry for Latinx Actors" in Latinx Actor Training, and various scholarly articles on radical inclusivity in musical theatre. Agustín's consulting business, Agustin Consulting and Theatrical Services, LLC, serves to guide professional actors through the many phases of the performing arts industry.

== Early life ==
Julio Agustín was born in The Bronx to Puerto Rican parents. Agustín began playing the piano for his high school choir. It is through his accompaniment work that Agustin discovered his passion for musical theatre.

== Career ==
After graduating from Florida State University with a BM in Music Theatre, Julio Agustín began his professional career as a swing in the national tour of Kiss of the Spider Woman from 1994 to 1996, where he worked with Chita Rivera. He booked his first Broadway show shortly afterwards. In 1997, he performed as a swing for the Original Broadway Cast of Steel Pier at the Richard Rodgers Theatre.

A few years later, Agustín performed as a company member for the Original Broadway Cast of Fosse at the Broadhurst Theatre. Agustín would work on this show from 1999 to 2001 with names such as Elizabeth Parkinson and Scott Wise. Nearly immediately after working in Chicago, Agustin jumped straight into performing in the Original Broadway Cast of Bells Are Ringing at the Gerald Schoenfeld Theatre (at the time known as the Plymouth Theatre) in 2001 with Faith Prince on this production.

Agustín returned to school to earn his MFA in acting from Columbia University where he studied from 2001 to 2002. He then took a break to return to the professional world. In 2003, Agustin traveled to Maine's Ogunquit Playhouse to perform in Evita. He would play Che opposite to Felicia Finley. Agustín performed as Rome Tome in the 2003 Original Broadway Cast of Never Gonna Dance at the Broadhurst Theatre. He worked with Nancy Lemenager and Noah Racey on this production.

After transitioning from school to the professional world and back, Agustín graduated from Pennsylvania State with his MFA in Directing in 2007. Agustín began his professional career in directing and choreographing. In 2007, he was the director/choreographer of Pennsylvania Center Stage's Movin' On (previously Out of Line).

Julio Agustín again returned to Broadway's Chicago from 2007 to 2008 to play Fred Casely(u/s) at the Shubert Theatre. He worked with Bebe Neuwirth and Bianca Marroquín during his second round in the production.

In 2008, Agustín traveled to the North Carolina Theatre to direct/choreograph Whistle Down the Wind. From 2010 to 2011, Agustín returned to Broadway to play Ambite in the Original Broadway cast of Women on the Verge of a Nervous Breakdown at the Belasco Theatre. He would work with Patti LuPone and Sherie Rene Scott and receive the Broadway Legacy Robe for this show.

In 2012, Agustín would direct Sweet Charity at The New Haarlem Arts Theatre. This show would go on to win an Audelco Award for best choreography by Lanie Munro.

In the summer of 2016, Julio choreographed In the Heights at the Hangar Theatre and again at the Geva Theatre in Rochester, NY.

== Theater credits ==
=== Broadway ===
Year	Show	Role	Notes
2010–2011	Women on the Verge of a Nervous Breakdown	Ambite (OBC)	Belasco Theatre; Nov 04, 2010 – Jan 02, 2001
2003–2004	Never Gonna Dance	Rome Tome (OBC)	Broadhurst Theatre; Dec 04, 2003 – Feb 15, 2004
2001	Bells Are Ringing	Carl (OBC)	Gerald Schoenfeld Theatre (Known as the Plymouth Theatre at the time); Apr 12, 2001 – Jun 10, 2001
2000 – 2001; 2007 – 2008	Chicago	Doctor/Harrison; Fred Casely	Shubert Theatre; 2000–2001; 2007–2008
1999–2001	Fosse	Company (OBC)	Broadhurst Theatre; Jan 14, 1999 – Aug 25, 2001
1997	Steel Pier	Swing (OBC)	Richard Rodgers Theatre; Apr 24, 1997 – Jun 28, 1997

=== Tours / Regional ===
Year	Show	Role	Notes
2026	Spring Awakening	Adult Male	Theatre 3 Dallas
2025	Waitress	Ensemble	Dallas Theater Center
2023	Destiny of Desire	Dr. Mendoza	The Old Globe
2010	West Side Story	Bernardo	The Muny
2004	Breakfast at Tiffany's	Jose	The Muny
2003	Evita	Che	Ogunquit Playhouse
1996	Seven Brides for Seven Brothers	Benjamin	Civic Light Opera of South Bay Cities
1994–1996	Kiss of the Spider Woman	Swing	National Tour; Nov. 1994 – Aug. 1996

== Directing/Choreography ==
Year	Show	Role	Notes
2026	Last Night at the Rue Bayou	Choreographer	Storyville Music Hall
2024	That Day in Tucson	Director	Norton Theatre, UNC
2024	In the Heights	Choreographer	Cleveland Play House
2022	On Your Feet!	Director – Choreographer	North Carolina Theatre
2022	Elliot, a Soldier's Fugue	Director	ENT Center for the Arts
2019	Sister Act	Director	Post Playhouse
2018	Guys and Dolls	Choreographer	Theatre Under the Stars
2017	In the Heights	Choreographer	Geva Theatre
2016	In the Heights	Choreographer	Hangar Theatre
2012	Sweet Charity	Director	New Haarlem Arts Theatre
2008	Whistle Down the Wind	Director / Choreographer	North Carolina Theatre
2007	Out of Line	Director / Choreography	Pennsylvania Center Stage

== Filmography ==
=== Film ===
Year	Film	Role
2005	The Producers	Samba Singer
2000	Center Stage	Jazz Dancer

== Awards and nominations ==
Year	Award	Category	Nominated Work	Result
2024	BroadwayWorld	Best Choreography	In The Heights	Nominated
2022	BroadwayWorld	Best Direction	On Your Feet	Nominated
2018	Houston Press Theatre Award	Choreography	In The Heights	Nominated
2016	Syracuse Area Live Theatre	Choreography	In The Heights	Nominated
2012	Audelco Award	Directing	Sweet Charity	Nominated
2011	Legacy Robe Award	Legacy Robe	Women on the Verge of a Nervous Breakdown	Won
