= Walnut Hill School =

Arts school in Natick, Massachusetts, US

Coordinates: 42.2918°N 71.3467°W

Walnut Hill School for the Arts
- Natick, Massachusetts; United States

Information
- Type: Private, boarding, arts
- Motto: Non Nobis Solum "Not for ourselves alone"
- Established: 1893
- Head of School: Eric Barber
- Enrollment: 239
- Campus: 30 acres (120,000 m^{2})
- Colors: Red (historic); Purple (modern)
- Tuition: $79,960 (boarding) $62,150 (day)
- Website: walnuthillarts.org

Walnut Hill School for the Arts is an independent boarding school and day school for the arts located in Natick, Massachusetts, United States. It is intended for student artists in grades 9-12.

== History and programs ==
=== Boarding school ===
Walnut Hill was founded in 1893 by Florence Bigelow and Charlotte Conant as a college preparatory school for women and a feeder school for Wellesley College. In 1972, the school rebranded itself as an arts-focused and coeducational school.

=== Majors ===
Students at Walnut Hill major in one of five arts disciplines: Dance, Music, Theatre, Visual Art, and Writing, Film, and Media Arts (WFMA, for short). Writing, Film and Media Arts classes include, but are not limited to, Poetry, Short Story Writing, Screenwriting & Playwriting, ColLaboratory, and Darkroom Photography.

=== Boston Ballet ===
Boston Ballet School merged with the Walnut Hill dance program in 2020 rebranding the company as Boston Ballet's pre professional division at Walnut Hill. This decision was met with backlash by members of the Walnut Hill community.

== Campus ==
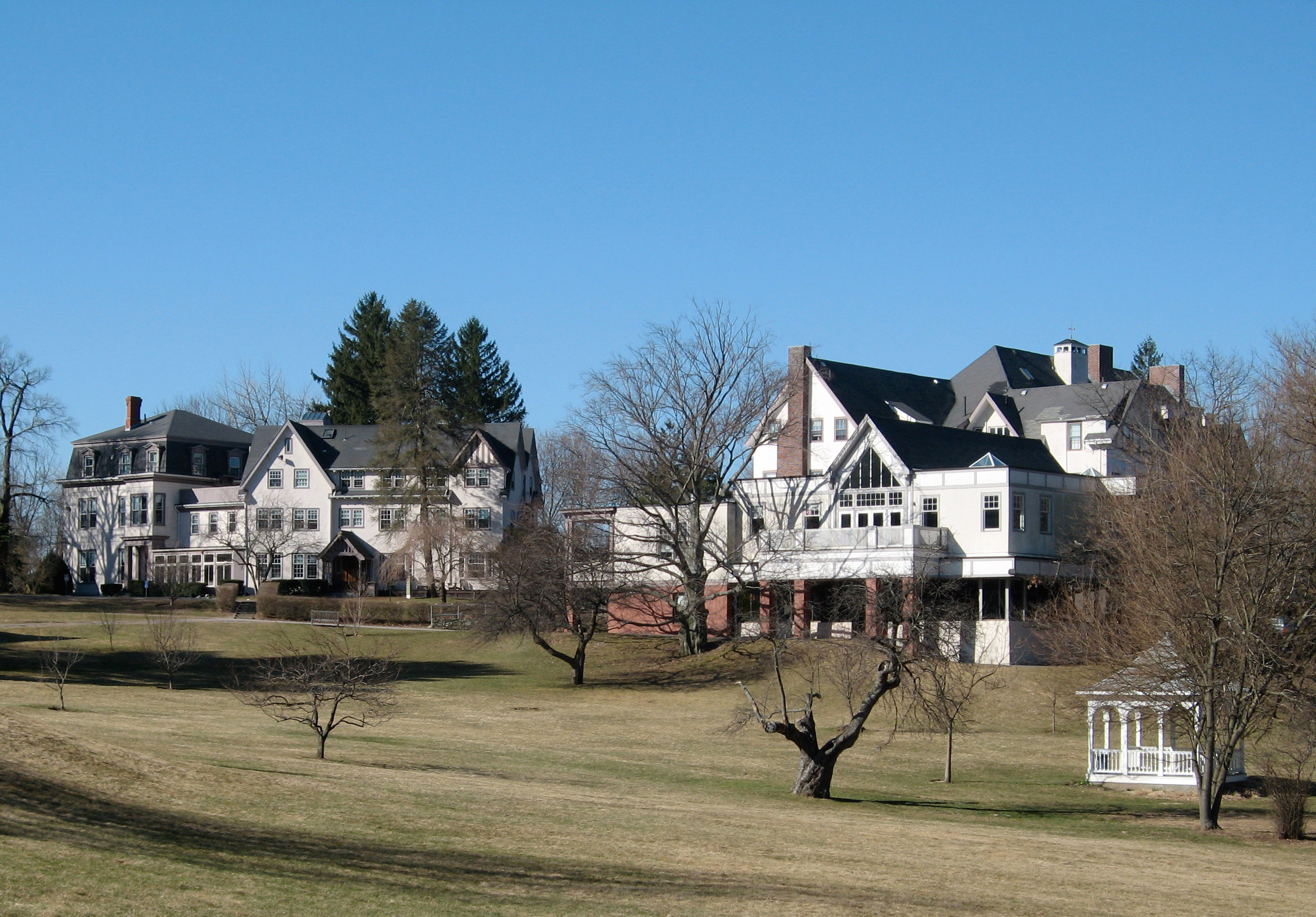
Walnut Hill School campus

The Walnut Hill campus has thirteen buildings on 40 acres (16 ha). Stowe, Eliot, Highland, Clark, New Cottage, Westerly, North House and Elizabeth Bishop Hall are the school's dorms. The campus also holds the Academic and Technology Center; the Delbridge Family Center for the Arts; the Dance Center; the Keiter Center for the Performing Arts; the Writing, Film, and Media Arts (WFMA) building; the Office of Admission; and the Head's House.

Eliot is the largest building on campus; its second and third floors serve as a dormitory. It contains Boswell Hall, the Keefe center, the dining hall, the student campus center and the school bookstore. Highland contains music practice rooms (both regular and soundproof), the Visual Art studios, Pooke Gallery, Amelia Hall and Highland Dormitory. Stowe, in addition to being a dormitory, is the location of the switchboard and many administrative offices, including the Head of School's office, external relations and facilities.

The Delbridge Family Center for the Arts is the most recent addition to the campus. It began construction in the 2015–2016 school year and was completed in July 2016. This structure includes a dance studio, a black box and a gallery.

== Notable alumni ==
- BenDeLaCreme, drag queen
- Elizabeth Bishop, Poet Laureate of the United States, 1949-1950
- Graham Campbell, actor
- Mei-Ann Chen, Assistant Conductor, Atlanta Symphony Orchestra
- Ava Deluca-Verley, actress in Growing Up Fisher
- Ralph Farris, co-founder, artistic director and violist of the string quartet ETHEL
- Gavilán Rayna Russom, musician
- Christian Finnegan, stand-up comedian and actor
- Jimmy Fowlie, actor
- Patricia Wright Gwyn, politician and librarian
- Van Hansis, soap opera actor
- Briga Heelan, actress in Ground Floor
- Heather Hemmens, played Alice Verdura in Hellcats
- Judith Hoag, actress, played April O'Neil in Teenage Mutant Ninja Turtles, and acting teacher
- Benny Ibarra, singer, musician, producer and actor
- Lia Ices, musician
- Rachelle Lefèvre, TV and film actress; Twilight film series and Under the Dome television series
- George Li, concert pianist
- Jack McCollough, co-founder of Proenza Schouler
- Charlie Neshyba-Hodges, played Marty in Come Fly Away; dancer and Ballet Master for Benjamin Millipied L.A. Dance Project
- Teddy Quinlivan, supermodel
- Chris Riggi, actor, played Scott Rosson on Gossip Girl
- Sasha Sokol, singer, composer, actress, and TV host
- Ella May Thornton, Georgia State Librarian
- Paige Turco, actress, played April O'Neil in Teenage Mutant Ninja Turtles II: The Secret of the Ooze and Teenage Mutant Ninja Turtles III
- Chi Che Wang, research biochemist and college professor
- Zitong Wang, concert pianist
- Harper Watters, ballet dancer and first soloist with Houston Ballet
- Barrett Wilbert Weed Broadway actress, played Veronica in Heathers: The Musical off-Broadway and Janis in Mean Girls (musical) on Broadway
- Joan Tower, Grammy-winning composer
- Marion Louise Pooke, artist
- Zac Young, pastry chief and Food Network judge
