= Holly Cruikshank =

American dancer (born 1973)

Holly Cruikshank (born June 18, 1973) is an American dancer. She is known for her role as Brenda in the Billy Joel/Twyla Tharp musical Movin' Out, and has also danced lead roles in two other Tony-award-winning Broadway musicals: Fosse and Contact. She has appeared as one of the house dancers on the NBC variety-competition show, The Singing Bee.

== Early life ==
Cruikshank was born in Fountain Hills, Arizona. She envisioned a career as a dancer from an early age, when she idolized the dancing of screen legend Cyd Charisse. She started ballet at the age of 3. By her teen years, she was rehearsing four hours a day and dancing with Phoenix-based "Ballet Arizona". Finally, after a year at the North Carolina School for the Performing Arts in Winston-Salem, she began professional auditions in earnest. Her attempts at a professional ballet career were unsuccessful, culminating in an audition for her "dream company", the Hubbard Street Dance Troupe in Chicago, where founder Lou Conte told her she was too tall to succeed as a professional ballerina (she is over 6 feet).

A dance teacher suggested she consider a career on Broadway instead. Pursuing the suggestion, she obtained her first role, a showgirl in Tommy Tune's The Will Rogers Follies at the age of 18. She was continuously employed as a Broadway dancer for the next 15 years until leaving to pursue a television career.

== Broadway career ==
Following her role in The Will Rogers Follies, Cruikshank had a series of increasingly visible successes, landing roles in Hello, Dolly, A Funny Thing Happened on the Way to the Forum, and finally a small featured roll in Fosse.

That led to a role in the Broadway run of Contact, understudying for Deborah Yates in the Tony-award-winning role of "The Girl in the Yellow Dress". When the Contact touring company formed in 2001, Cruikshank obtained the role and toured for a year, though frustrated in the early going as some show posters went out bearing Yates' image instead of Cruikshank's. Ultimately, Cruikshank earned rave reviews in the role; Playbill, for example, called her "a stunning dancing dynamo."

In 2002, while touring with Contact, Cruikshank and partner David Gomez auditioned together on a whim for the upcoming Movin' Out, and were selected for the original Broadway cast. Initially dancing the lead role of Brenda in matinee performances, Cruikshank took over lead billing for the role on Broadway in 2003 after Elizabeth Parkinson left the show, then continued it with the touring company from 2004–2007, again to rave reviews. The London Daily Telegraph, for example, wrote: "Holly Cruikshank as Brenda has the most impossibly long legs you are ever likely to see and does things with them that seem to defy the basic laws of human anatomy."

== Screen career ==
Cruikshank has played small parts in several movies, and was one of the house dancers (known as the "honey bees") on CMT's The Singing Bee.

== Awards ==
- Nominated: LA Ovation Award, Best Featured Actress in a Musical, 2001
- Won: Helen Hayes Award, Outstanding Lead Actress, Non-Resident Production, 2005
