= Matthew Friedman =

Matthew Friedman may refer to:

- Matthew Friedman (musician), American musician, singer and performer
- Matthew Friedman (film editor), American film editor and lecturer
- Matthew S. Friedman, American human rights advocate
