= Karine Plantadit =

History of Karine Plantadit

Karine Plantadit (born January 15, 1970) is a dancer and performer. She was born in France and raised in Cameroon. She moved to Cannes at age 14 to study dance. She subsequently moved to New York City to study dance with Alvin Ailey.

Plantadit was nominated in 2010 for a Tony Award in the category of Best Featured Actress in a Musical for her playing the role of Kate in the musical Come Fly Away. She was also in Saturday Night Fever, The Lion King, Movin' Out and Frida, in which she played Josephine Baker.

== Stage ==
Year	Title	Role	Venue	Ref.
1997	The Lion King	Ensemble Dancer	Broadway, New Amsterdam Theatre	
1999	Saturday Night Fever	Shirley	Broadway, Minskoff Theatre	
2000	Rodgers and Hammerstein's Cinderella	Ensemble	U.S. National Tour	
2002	Movin' Out	Ensemble	Broadway, Richard Rodgers Theatre	
2010	Come Fly Away	Kate	Broadway, Marquis Theatre	
2013	After Midnight	Performer	Broadway, Brooks Atkinson Theatre	

== Awards and nominations ==
Year	Award	Category	Work	Result	Ref.
2010	Drama League Award	Distinguished Performance	Come Fly Away	Nominated	
2010	Tony Awards	Best Featured Actress in a Musical	Come Fly Away	Nominated	
2010	Astaire Awards	Outstanding Female Dancer in a Broadway Show	Come Fly Away	Nominated	
2014	Astaire Awards	Outstanding Female Dancer in a Broadway Show	After Midnight	Won	
