= Selya =

Selya is a surname. Notable people with the surname include:

- Bruce M. Selya (1934–2025), American jurist, United States circuit judge
- John Selya, American ballet dancer and choreographer
