= Drama Desk Award for Outstanding Actress in a Musical =

Theater award

Drama Desk Award for Outstanding Actress
- Awarded for: Outstanding Actress in a Musical
- Location: New York City
- Country: United States
- Presented by: Drama Desk
- First award: 1975
- Final award: 2022
- Website: dramadesk.org (defunct)

The Drama Desk Award for Outstanding Actress in a Musical was an annual award presented by Drama Desk in recognition of achievements in theatre across collective Broadway, off-Broadway and off-off-Broadway productions in New York City. The award was one of eight new acting awards first presented in 1975, when Drama Desk retired an earlier award that had made no distinction between work in plays and musicals, nor between actors and actresses, nor between lead performers and featured performers.

After the 2022 ceremony, all eight acting categories introduced in 1975 were retired. The award for Outstanding Actress in a Musical, along with Outstanding Actor in a Musical, were replaced in 2023 with the gender neutral category of Outstanding Lead Performance in a Musical.

== Winners and nominees ==
Key

and bold indicates the winner.

=== 1960s ===
| Year | Actress | Musical | Character |
1964
| 1964 | **Imelda de Martin** | **The Amorous Flea** | **Agnes** |
1965–68
| 1965–68 | —N/a | —N/a | —N/a |
1969
| 1969 | **Dorothy Loudon** | **The Fig Leaves Are Falling** | **Lillian Stone** |
| 1969 | **Bernadette Peters** | **Dames at Sea** | **Ruby** |

=== 1970s ===
| Year | Actress | Musical | Character |
1970
| 1970 | **Lauren Bacall** | **Applause** † | **Margo Channing** |
| 1970 | **Sandy Duncan** | **The Boyfriend** ‡ | **Maisie** |
| 1970 | **Ethel Merman** | **Hello Dolly** | **Dolly Gallagher Levi** |
1971
| 1971 | **Helen Gallagher** | **No, No, Nanette** † | **Lucille Early** |
| 1971 | **Alexis Smith** | **Follies** ‡ | **Phyllis Rogers Stone** |
1972
| 1972 | **Jonelle Allen** | **The Two Gentlemen of Verona** | **Silvia** |
1973
| 1973 | **Glynis Johns** | **A Little Night Music** | **Desiree Armfeldt** |
| 1973 | **Michele Lee** | **Seesaw** | **Gittel Mosca** |
1974
| 1974 | **Ruby Lynn Reyner** | **La Bohemia** | **Trilby** |
1975
| 1975 | **Angela Lansbury** | **Gypsy** | **Mama Rose** |
| 1975 | Marcia McClain | Where's Charley? | Amy Spettigue |
| 1975 | Stephanie Mills | The Wiz | Dorothy Gale |
| 1975 | Bernadette Peters | Mack and Mabel | Mabel Normand |
| 1975 | Ann Reinking | Goodtime Charley | Joan of Arc |
1976
| 1976 | **Kelly Bishop** | **A Chorus Line** | **Sheila Bryant** |
| 1976 | **Donna McKechnie** | **A Chorus Line** | **Cassie Ferguson** |
| 1976 | Penny Fuller | Rex | Anne Boleyn / Elizabeth I |
| 1976 | Patti LuPone | The Robber Bridegroom | Rosamund Musgrove |
| 1976 | Virginia Seidel | Very Good Eddie | Elsie Darling |
| 1976 | Elizabeth Wilson | The Threepenny Opera | Celia Peachum |
1977
| 1977 | **Clamma Dale** | **Porgy and Bess** | **Bess** |
| 1977 | Joan Copeland | Pal Joey | Vera Simpson |
| 1977 | Catherine Cox | Music Is | Viola |
| 1977 | Esther Hinds | Porgy and Bess | Bess |
| 1977 | Julia McKenzie | Side by Side by Sondheim | Various Characters |
| 1977 | Meryl Streep | Happy End | Lillian Holiday |
1978
| 1978 | **Nell Carter** | **Ain't Misbehavin** | **Nell** |
| 1978 | Carlin Glynn | The Best Little Whorehouse in Texas | Mona Stangley |
| 1978 | Judy Kaye | On the Twentieth Century | Agnes |
| 1978 | Angela Lansbury | The King and I | Anna Leonowens |
| 1978 | Phyllis Newman | My Mother was a Fortune Teller | Phyllis |
| 1978 | Charlayne Woodard | Ain't Misbehavin | Charlayne |
1979
| 1979 | **Angela Lansbury** | **Sweeney Todd** | **Mrs. Lovett** |
| 1979 | Lucie Arnaz | They're Playing Our Song | Sonia Walsk |
| 1979 | Dorothy Loudon | Ballroom | Bea Asher |

=== 1980s ===
| Year | Actress | Musical | Character |
1980
| 1980 | **Patti LuPone** | **Evita** | **Eva Perón** |
| 1980 | Sandy Duncan | Peter Pan | Peter Pan |
| 1980 | Ann Miller | Sugar Babies | Ann |
| 1980 | Sigourney Weaver | Das Lusitania Songspiel | Unknown |
1981
| 1981 | **Lena Horne** | **Lena Horne: The Lady and Her Music** | **Herself** |
| 1981 | Chita Rivera | Bring Back Birdie | Rosie Alvarez |
1982
| 1982 | **Jennifer Holliday** | **Dreamgirls** | **Effie White** |
| 1982 | Sheryl Lee Ralph | Dreamgirls | Deena Jones |
1983
| 1983 | **Natalia Makarova** | **On Your Toes** | **Vera Barnova** |
| 1983 | Mara Beckerman | Charlotte Sweet | Charlotte Sweet |
| 1983 | Betty Buckley | Cats | Grizabella |
| 1983 | Ellen Greene | Little Shop of Horrors | Audrey |
| 1983 | Twiggy | My One and Only | Edith Herbert |
1984
| 1984 | **Chita Rivera** | **The Rink** | **Anna** |
| 1984 | Shirley MacLaine | Shirley MacLaine on Broadway | Herself |
| 1984 | Liza Minnelli | The Rink | Angel |
| 1984 | Bernadette Peters | Sunday in the Park with George | Dot / Marie |
| 1984 | Alyson Reed | Marilyn | Marilyn Monroe |
1985
| 1985 | —N/a | —N/a | —N/a |
1986
| 1986 | **Bernadette Peters** | **Song and Dance** | **Emma** |
| 1986 | Debbie Allen | Sweet Charity | Charity Hope Valentine |
| 1986 | Patti Cohenour | The Mystery of Edwin Drood | Miss Deirdre Peregrine / Rosa Bud |
| 1986 | Terri Klausner | Goblin Market | Laura |
| 1986 | Cleo Laine | The Mystery of Edwin Drood | Angela Prysock / The Princess Puffer |
| 1986 | Ann Morrison | Goblin Market | Lizzie |
1987
| 1987 | **Teresa Stratas** | **Rags** | **Rebecca Hershkowitz** |
| 1987 | Mary Elizabeth Mastrantonio | The Knife | Jenny |
| 1987 | Lonette McKee | Lady Day at Emerson's Bar & Grill | Billie Holiday |
| 1987 | Maryann Plunkett | Me and My Girl | Sally Smith |
1988
| 1988 | **Patti LuPone** | **Anything Goes** | **Reno Sweeney** |
| 1988 | Sarah Brightman | The Phantom of the Opera | Christine Daaé |
| 1988 | Judy Kuhn | Chess | Florence Vassy |
| 1988 | Bernadette Peters | Into the Woods | The Witch |
1989
| 1989 | **Toni diBuono** | **Forbidden Broadway** | **Various Characters** |
| 1989 | Beth Fowler | Sweeney Todd | Mrs. Lovett |
| 1989 | Debbie Shapiro Gravitte | Jerome Robbins' Broadway | Various Characters |
| 1989 | Roxie Lucas | Forbidden Broadway | Various Characters |
| 1989 | Faith Prince | Jerome Robbins' Broadway | Ma / Tessie / Company |

=== 1990s ===
| Year | Actress | Musical | Character |
1990
| 1990 | **Tyne Daly** | **Gypsy** | **Mama Rose** |
| 1990 | Debby Boone | The Sound of Music | Maria von Trapp |
| 1990 | Lynne Wintersteller | Closer Than Ever | Various Characters |
1991
| 1991 | **Lea Salonga** | **Miss Saigon** | **Kim** |
| 1991 | June Angela | Shogun | Lady Mariko |
| 1991 | Daisy Eagan | The Secret Garden | Mary Lennox |
| 1991 | LaChanze | Once on This Island | Ti Moune |
1992
| 1992 | **Faith Prince** | **Guys and Dolls** | **Miss Adelaide** |
| 1992 | Sophie Hayden | The Most Happy Fella | Rosabella |
| 1992 | Donna Murphy | Song of Singapore | Rose |
1993
| 1993 | **Chita Rivera** | **Kiss of the Spider Woman** | **Aurora / Spider Woman** |
| 1993 | Laura Bell Bundy | Ruthless! | Tina Denmark |
| 1993 | Donna English | Ruthless! | Judy Denmark / Ginger Del Marco |
| 1993 | Helen Schneider | Frida | Frida Kahlo |
| 1993 | Linda Stephens | Wings | Emily Stilson |
1994
| 1994 | **Donna Murphy** | **Passion** | **Fosca** |
| 1994 | Susan Egan | Beauty and the Beast | Belle |
| 1994 | Melissa Errico | My Fair Lady | Eliza Doolittle |
| 1994 | Margaret Illman | The Red Shoes | Victoria Page |
1995
| 1995 | **Glenn Close** | **Sunset Boulevard** | **Norma Desmond** |
| 1995 | Candy Buckley | The Petrified Prince | Queen Katarina |
| 1995 | Julie Johnson | Das Barbecü | Various Characters |
| 1995 | Lonette McKee | Show Boat | Julie LaVerne |
| 1995 | Elaine Stritch | Show Boat | Parthy Ann Hawks |
1996
| 1996 | **Julie Andrews** | **Victor/Victoria** | **Victoria Grant** |
| 1996 | Terri Klausner | Bed and Sofa | Ludmilla |
| 1996 | Crista Moore | Big | Susan Lawrence |
| 1996 | Donna Murphy | The King and I | Anna Leonowens |
| 1996 | Daphne Rubin-Vega | Rent | Mimi Marquez |
| 1996 | Karen Ziemba | I Do! I Do! | She (Agnes) |
1997
| 1997 | **Bebe Neuwirth** | **Chicago** | **Velma Kelly** |
| 1997 | Linda Eder | Jekyll & Hyde | Lucy Harris |
| 1997 | Pamela Isaacs | The Life | Queen |
| 1997 | Lauren Ward | Violet | Violet Karl |
| 1997 | Karen Ziemba | Steel Pier | Rita Racine |
1998
| 1998 | **Natasha Richardson** | **Cabaret** | **Sally Bowles** |
| 1998 | Melissa Errico | High Society | Tracy Samantha Lord |
| 1998 | Marin Mazzie | Ragtime | Mother |
| 1998 | Alice Ripley and Emily Skinner | Side Show | Violet and Daisy Hilton |
1999
| 1999 | **Carolee Carmello** | **Parade** | **Lucille Frank** |
| 1999 | **Bernadette Peters** | **Annie Get Your Gun** | **Annie Oakley** |
| 1999 | Siân Phillips | Marlene | Marlene Dietrich |

=== 2000s ===
| Year | Actress | Musical | Character |
2000
| 2000 | **Heather Headley** | **Aida** | **Aida** |
| 2000 | Toni Collette | The Wild Party | Queenie |
| 2000 | Rebecca Luker | The Music Man | Marian Paroo |
| 2000 | Marin Mazzie | Kiss Me Kate | Lilli Vanessi / Katherine |
| 2000 | Audra McDonald | Marie Christine | Marie Christine L'Adrese |
| 2000 | Julia Murney | The Wild Party | Queenie |
2001
| 2001 | **Marla Schaffel** | **Jane Eyre** | **Jane Eyre** |
| 2001 | Christine Ebersole | 42nd Street | Dorothy Brock |
| 2001 | Kaitlin Hopkins | Bat Boy: The Musical | Meredith Parker |
| 2001 | LaChanze | The Bubbly Black Girl Sheds Her Chameleon Skin | Viveca |
| 2001 | Sally Mayes | Pete 'n' Keely | Keely |
| 2001 | Faith Prince | Bells Are Ringing | Ella Peterson |
2002
| 2002 | **Sutton Foster** | **Thoroughly Modern Millie** | **Millie Dillmount** |
| 2002 | Laura Benanti | Into the Woods | Cinderella |
| 2002 | Garrett Long | The Spitfire Grill | Percy Talbott |
| 2002 | Louise Pitre | Mamma Mia | Donna Sheridan |
| 2002 | Sherie Rene Scott | The Last Five Years | Cathy Hyatt |
| 2002 | Vanessa Williams | Into the Woods | The Witch |
2003
| 2003 | **Marissa Jaret Winokur** | **Hairspray** | **Tracy Turnblad** |
| 2003 | Stephanie D'Abruzzo | Avenue Q | Kate Monster / Lucy the Slut |
| 2003 | Ann Duquesnay | Cookin' at the Cookery | Alberta Hunter / Various Characters |
| 2003 | Wei Huang | La bohème | Mimi |
| 2003 | Elizabeth Parkinson | Movin' Out | Brenda |
| 2003 | Bernadette Peters | Gypsy | Mama Rose |
2004
| 2004 | **Donna Murphy** | **Wonderful Town** | **Ruth Sherwood** |
| 2004 | Kristin Chenoweth | Wicked | Glinda |
| 2004 | Judy McLane | Johnny Guitar | Vienna |
| 2004 | Idina Menzel | Wicked | Elphaba |
| 2004 | Elaine Paige | Sweeney Todd | Mrs. Lovett |
| 2004 | Tonya Pinkins | Caroline, or Change | Caroline Thibodeaux |
2005
| 2005 | **Victoria Clark** | **The Light in the Piazza** | **Margaret Johnson** |
| 2005 | Christina Applegate | Sweet Charity | Charity Hope Valentine |
| 2005 | Sutton Foster | Little Women | Josephine 'Jo' March |
| 2005 | LaChanze | Dessa Rose | Dessa Rose |
| 2005 | Sherie Rene Scott | Dirty Rotten Scoundrels | Christine Colgate |
| 2005 | Rachel York | Dessa Rose | Ruth |
2006
| 2006 | **Christine Ebersole** | **Grey Gardens** | **'Little Edie' Beale** |
| 2006 | Nancy Anderson | Fanny Hill | Fanny Hill |
| 2006 | Sutton Foster | The Drowsy Chaperone | Janet Van De Graaff |
| 2006 | Patti LuPone | Sweeney Todd | Mrs. Lovett |
| 2006 | Idina Menzel | See What I Wanna See | Kesa / Wife / Actress |
| 2006 | Kelli O'Hara | The Pajama Game | Catherine 'Babe' Williams |
2007
| 2007 | **Audra McDonald** | **110 in the Shade** | **Lizzie Curry** |
| 2007 | **Donna Murphy** | **Lovemusik** | **Lotte Lenya** |
| 2007 | Laura Bell Bundy | Legally Blonde | Elle Woods |
| 2007 | Ashley Brown | Mary Poppins | Mary Poppins |
| 2007 | Kristin Chenoweth | The Apple Tree | Eve / Princess Barbara / Ella and Passionella |
| 2007 | Lea Michele | Spring Awakening | Wendla Bergmann |
2008
| 2008 | **Patti LuPone** | **Gypsy** | **Mama Rose** |
| 2008 | Sierra Boggess | The Little Mermaid | Princess Ariel |
| 2008 | Kelli O'Hara | South Pacific | Ensign Nellie Forbush |
| 2008 | Faith Prince | A Catered Affair | Agnes 'Aggie' Hurley |
| 2008 | Alice Ripley | Next to Normal | Diana Goodman |
| 2008 | Jenna Russell | Sunday in the Park with George | Dot / Marie |
2009
| 2009 | **Allison Janney** | **9 to 5** | **Violet Newstead** |
| 2009 | Stephanie J. Block | 9 to 5 | Judy Bernly |
| 2009 | Stockard Channing | Pal Joey | Vera Simpson |
| 2009 | Sutton Foster | Shrek | Princess Fiona |
| 2009 | Megan Hilty | 9 to 5 | Doralee Rhodes |
| 2009 | Karen Murphy | My Vaudeville Man! | Mud Donahue |

=== 2010s ===
| Year | Actress | Musical | Character |
2010
| 2010 | **Montego Glover** | **Memphis** | **Felicia Farrell** |
| 2010 | **Catherine Zeta-Jones** | **A Little Night Music** | **Desiree Armfeldt** |
| 2010 | Kate Baldwin | Finian's Rainbow | Sharon McLonergan |
| 2010 | Jayne Houdyshell | Coraline | Coraline |
| 2010 | Christiane Noll | Ragtime | Mother |
| 2010 | Sherie Rene Scott | Everyday Rapture | Sherie Rene Scott |
2011
| 2011 | **Sutton Foster** | **Anything Goes** | **Reno Sweeney** |
| 2011 | Beth Leavel | Baby It's You! | Florence Greenberg |
| 2011 | Patina Miller | Sister Act | Deloris Van Cartier |
| 2011 | Donna Murphy | The People in the Picture | Bubbie / Raisel |
| 2011 | Sherie Rene Scott | Women on the Verge of a Nervous Breakdown | Pepa |
2012
| 2012 | **Audra McDonald** | **Porgy and Bess** | **Bess** |
| 2012 | Miche Braden | The Devil's Music | Bessie Smith |
| 2012 | Jan Maxwell | Follies | Phyllis Rogers Stone |
| 2012 | Kelli O'Hara | Nice Work If You Can Get It | Billie Bendix |
| 2012 | Bernadette Peters | Follies | Sally Durant Plummer |
| 2012 | Molly Ranson | Carrie | Carrie White |
2013
| 2013 | **Laura Osnes** | **Rodgers + Hammerstein's Cinderella** | **Ella** |
| 2013 | Kate Baldwin | Giant | Leslie Lynnton Benedict |
| 2013 | Stephanie J. Block | The Mystery of Edwin Drood | Edwin Drood / Miss Alice Nutting |
| 2013 | Carolee Carmello | Scandalous | Aimee Semple McPherson |
| 2013 | Lindsay Mendez | Dogfight | Rose Fenny |
| 2013 | Donna Murphy | Into the Woods | The Witch |
| 2013 | Jenny Powers | Donnybrook! | Mary Kate Danaher |
2014
| 2014 | **Jessie Mueller** | **Beautiful: The Carole King Musical** | **Carole King** |
| 2014 | Sutton Foster | Violet | Violet Karl |
| 2014 | Idina Menzel | If/Then | Elizabeth Vaughn |
| 2014 | Kelli O'Hara | The Bridges of Madison County | Francesca Johnson |
| 2014 | Margo Seibert | Tamar of the River | Tamar |
| 2014 | Barrett Wilbert Weed | Heathers | Veronica Sawyer |
2015
| 2015 | **Kristin Chenoweth** | **On the Twentieth Century** | **Lily Garland / Mildred Plotka** |
| 2015 | Kate Baldwin | John & Jen | Jen |
| 2015 | Leanne Cope | An American in Paris | Lise Dassin |
| 2015 | Erin Davie | Side Show | Violet Hilton |
| 2015 | Lisa Howard | It Shoulda Been You | Jenny Steinberg |
| 2015 | Chita Rivera | The Visit | Claire Zachanassian |
2016
| 2016 | **Cynthia Erivo** | **The Color Purple** | **Celie Harris Johnson** |
| 2016 | Laura Benanti | She Loves Me | Amalia Balash |
| 2016 | Carmen Cusack | Bright Star | Alice Murphy |
| 2016 | Jessie Mueller | Waitress | Jenna Hunterson |
| 2016 | Annette O'Toole | Southern Comfort | Robert Eads |
2017
| 2017 | **Bette Midler** | **Hello, Dolly!** | **Dolly Gallagher Levi** |
| 2017 | Christy Altomare | Anastasia | Anya |
| 2017 | Christine Ebersole | War Paint | Elizabeth Arden |
| 2017 | Sutton Foster | Sweet Charity | Charity Hope Valentine |
| 2017 | Patti LuPone | War Paint | Helena Rubinstein |
| 2017 | Laura Osnes | Bandstand | Julia Trojan |
2018
| 2018 | **Jessie Mueller** | **Carousel** | **Julie Jordan** |
| 2018 | Gizel Jiménez | Miss You Like Hell | Olivia |
| 2018 | LaChanze | Summer | Diva Donna |
| 2018 | Ashley Park | KPOP | MwE |
| 2018 | Daphne Rubin-Vega | Miss You Like Hell | Beatriz |
2019
| 2019 | **Stephanie J. Block** | **The Cher Show** | **Star** |
| 2019 | Beth Leavel | The Prom | Dee Dee Allen |
| 2019 | Rebecca Naomi Jones | Rodgers & Hammerstein's Oklahoma! | Laurey Williams |
| 2019 | Anika Noni Rose | Carmen Jones | Carmen Jones |
| 2019 | Stacey Sargeant | Rags Parkland Sings the Songs of the Future | Beaux Weathers |

=== 2020s ===
| Year | Actress | Musical | Character |
2020
| 2020 | **Adrienne Warren** | **Tina: The Tina Turner Musical** | **Tina Turner** |
| 2020 | Tammy Blanchard | Little Shop of Horrors | Audrey |
| 2020 | Beth Malone | The Unsinkable Molly Brown | Molly Brown |
| 2020 | Saycon Sengbloh | The Secret Life of Bees | Rosaleen |
| 2020 | Elizabeth Stanley | Jagged Little Pill | Mary Jane "M.J." Healy |
| 2021 | No awards: New York theatres shuttered, March 2020 to September 2021, due to the COVID-19 pandemic in New York City | | |
2022
| 2022 | **Joaquina Kalukango** | **Paradise Square** | **Nelly O'Brien** |
| 2022 | Kearstin Piper Brown | Intimate Apparel | Esther |
| 2022 | Victoria Clark | Kimberly Akimbo | Kimberly |
| 2022 | Sharon D. Clarke | Caroline, or Change | Caroline Thibodeaux |
| 2022 | Jeanna de Waal | Diana | Princess Diana |

== Multiple Winners ==
3 wins

- Patti LuPone
- Donna Murphy
- Bernadette Peters

2 wins

- Sutton Foster
- Angela Lansbury
- Audra McDonald
- Jessie Mueller
- Chita Rivera

== Multiple nominees ==
8 nominations

- Bernadette Peters

7 nominations

- Sutton Foster
- Donna Murphy

6 nominations

- Patti LuPone

4 nominations

- LaChanze
- Kelli O'Hara
- Faith Prince
- Chita Rivera
- Sherie Rene Scott

3 nominations

- Kate Baldwin
- Stephanie J. Block
- Kristin Chenoweth
- Christine Ebersole
- Angela Lansbury
- Audra McDonald
- Idina Menzel
- Jessie Mueller

2 nominations

- Laura Benanti
- Laura Bell Bundy
- Carolee Carmello
- Victoria Clark
- Melissa Errico
- Terri Klausner
- Beth Leavel
- Dorothy Loudon
- Marin Mazzie
- Lonette McKee
- Laura Osnes
- Alice Ripley
- Daphne Rubin-Vega
- Karen Ziemba

== See also ==
- Laurence Olivier Award for Best Actress in a Musical
- Tony Award for Best Performance by a Leading Actress in a Musical
