= Keith Roberts (dancer) =

American dancer

Keith Roberts is a professional dancer who performed in Twyla Tharp's Las Vegas show Sinatra Dance With Me, which opened on December 11, 2010, and ran through April 2, 2011.

He previously starred as Hank in Tharp's Broadway show Come Fly Away (March 25, 2010 – September 5, 2010). He danced with American Ballet Theatre (ABT) from 1987 to 1999, during which time he also performed on Broadway in Matthew Bourne's Swan Lake and in Fosse. He has worked extensively with Twyla Tharp since 1988, originating leading roles in most of her ballets at ABT and Twyla Tharp Dance, and in her Broadway shows Movin' Out and Come Fly Away and has regularly staged Twyla Tharp ballets worldwide.

== Training ==
Roberts was born in Denver, Colorado into a military family. His interest in dance began when he saw his younger sister's dance recital. He joined his sister in jazz and tap lessons, followed by ballet lessons when his family was stationed in Germany. Back in the U.S. at age eleven, Roberts auditioned for the School of American Ballet, the San Francisco Ballet School, and the Houston Ballet Academy summer programs. Accepted by all three, Roberts attended Houston, during which time he decided to pursue a professional career. He moved away from home at thirteen to attend the University of North Carolina School of the Arts, from which he graduated in 1987. Roberts also attended the School of American Ballet Summer Program and danced with Julie Kent at the School of American Ballet's New Choreography workshop performance in July 1986.

== American Ballet Theatre ==
In 1987, aged seventeen, Roberts joined American Ballet Theatre (ABT) as a member of the corps de ballet at the invitation of artistic director (1980–89) Mikhail Baryshnikov. Baryshnikov "served as an artistic role model for Roberts" and "suggested to Twyla Tharp that Roberts would be suited to her work." Dance Magazine's Gus Solomons Jr. called Roberts "a stylistic chameleon".

Roberts danced many principal roles during the 1996–97 season, including Romeo in Romeo and Juliet; working with artistic director (1992–?) Kevin McKenzie and Georgina Parkinson on Romeo and performing it at ABT was something to which he had aspired since he was sixteen and "a dream come true." Roberts was promoted to principal dancer in 1997. He left the ABT in 1999 because "I had done everything I wanted to do in ballet, and I wanted to try something different". In 2013, Roberts returned to American Ballet Theatre as a ballet master.

=== Twyla Tharp Dance (2000–2002) ===
Twyla Tharp formed a new troupe in 2000 and named it Twyla Tharp Dance. Roberts was an original member of this group, which debuted at the American Dance Festival in Durham, North Carolina in June 2000. Roberts originated leading roles in Surfer at the River Styx, Mozart Clarinet Concerto K581 and Beethoven's Hammerklavier and performed them along with the Known by Heart Duet and Sinatra Suite.

=== Twyla Tharp on Broadway ===
See Broadway.

=== Staging ===
Twyla Tharp works staged by Roberts:

==== After All ====
- Ice Theatre of New York (2007)

==== Brief Fling ====
- American Ballet Theatre (2008)

==== The Golden Section ====
- Ballet Arizona (2007, 2009)

==== In the Upper Room ====
- Birmingham Royal Ballet (2005)
- American Ballet Theatre (2005–6)
- Bolshoi Ballet (2007)
- Boston Ballet (2008)
- Corella Ballet Castilla y Leon (2008)
- Orlando Ballet Theater (2008)
- Houston Ballet (2009)

==== Nine Sinatra Songs ====
- Birmingham Royal Ballet (2006–7)
- Ballet West (2008)
- Nevada Ballet Theater (2008)

=== Choreography ===
- Assistant Choreographer, Rabbit and Rogue. Choreographed by Twyla Tharp on American Ballet Theatre; world premiere June 3, 2008, Metropolitan Opera House.

== Broadway ==
=== Matthew Bourne's Swan Lake ===
Roberts made his Broadway debut in Matthew Bourne's Swan Lake in December 1998, taking over the lead role of The Swan from originator Adam Cooper. Roberts performed the role through January 23, 1999.

=== Fosse ===
In January 1999, Roberts took over the Percussion 4 role in Fosse originated by Desmond Richardson. The role also included numbers Cool Hand Luke, Mr. Bojangles (The Spirit) and ensemble pieces; Roberts initially danced it through February 13. He returned April 11 and danced it until the last performance of Fosse on August 25, 2001.

=== Movin' Out ===
Roberts originated the role of Tony in Twyla Tharp's Movin' Out, which debuted on Broadway at the Richard Rodgers Theater on October 24, 2002, and ran through December 11, 2005. In October 2000, Tharp started working with Roberts and other Twyla Tharp Dance company members on Movin' Out. To help him prepare to portray Tony, Tharp had Roberts study Henry Winkler's Fonzie from the television show Happy Days and John Travolta's walk in the opening sequence of the movie Saturday Night Fever. Tharp also had the Movin' Out cast view news film and popular films about the Vietnam war at New York's Museum of Television and Radio. Roberts received a 2003 Tony Award Nomination for Actor (Featured Role in a Musical) and 2003 Fred and Adele Astaire Award nomination for Best Male Dancer for his role.

Roberts performed the role of Tony in parts of the National Tour of Movin' Out, which ran from January 27, 2004, through January 21, 2007. In 2006, Roberts said he was "still excited by the show", "[never stopped] learning about it" and was "always challenged by it". The tour launched in Detroit and went to Washington D.C., Denver, Seattle, San Diego, San Francisco, Los Angeles, and Sacramento.

=== Come Fly Away ===
Roberts originated the role of Hank in Twyla Tharp's Come Fly Away, which debuted on Broadway at the Marquis Theater on March 25, 2010, after its premiere as Come Fly With Me at Atlanta's Alliance Theater in September 2009.

Roberts received a 2010 Fred & Adele Astaire Award nomination for best Male Dancer for his role.

== Guest appearances ==
- Vladimir Malakov group
- Jose Carreño group
- 1994: Lar Lubovitch Dance Company: A Brahms Symphony
- 1998: Lar Lubovitch Dance Company, City Center Gala: Othello (Othello)
- 2007: 22nd Anniversary Dance Rocks Career Transition for Dancers benefit in New York: Shameless from Movin' Out with castmate Elizabeth Parkinson
- 2009: Dance Teacher Summit Gala: Performed "Shameless" from Movin' Out with castmate Laurie Kanyok
- May 3, 2010: Performed One for My Baby from Come Fly Away with castmate Karine Plantadit at The New York Pops 27th birthday gala The Best Is Yet To Come: Celebrating the Legacy of Frank Sinatra at Carnegie Hall.
- June 7, 2010: Performed with the cast of Come Fly Away at the 2010 Astaire Awards at the Gerald Lynch Theater.
- June 17, 2010: Performed That's Life from Come Fly Away with castmate Karine Plantadit on TV show So You Think You Can Dance.

== Awards ==
- 2003 Tony Awards nomination, Actor (Featured Role in a Musical) for role of "Tony" in Movin' Out
- 2003 TDF/Astaire Awards nomination, best Male Dancer for role of "Tony" in Movin' Out
- 2010 Fred & Adele Astaire Awards nomination, best Male Dancer for role of Hank in Come Fly Away

== Television ==
- Live from Lincoln Center: Romeo and Juliet (PBS) (1988?)
- Twyla Tharp: Oppositions (PBS) (1996) – performed in In the Upper Room
- American Ballet Theatre Now – Variety and Virtuosity (PBS Dance in America) (1998) – performed in Remanso and 3rd Movement from Bruch Violin Concerto #1
- 57th Annual Tony Awards (CBS) (June 8, 2003) – performed with cast of Movin' Out
- 64th Annual Tony Awards (CBS) (June 13, 2010) – performed with cast of Come Fly Away
- So You Think You Can Dance (FOX) (June 17, 2010) – see Guest Appearances.
