= Come Fly Away =

Dance revue

- Broadway Playbill
- Music: Various Artists
- Lyrics: Various Artists
- Book: Twyla Tharp
- Productions: 2010 Broadway; 2011 US Tour

Come Fly Away is a dance revue conceived, directed and choreographed by Twyla Tharp, around the songs of Frank Sinatra. The musical, set in a New York City nightclub, follows four couples as they look for love.

It premiered on Broadway in March 2010 after tryouts in Atlanta and has received mostly warm reviews.

== Production ==
Come Fly Away, originally titled Come Fly with Me, ran at the Alliance Theatre, Atlanta, in September 2009. It started Broadway previews at the Marquis Theatre on March 1, 2010, and opened on March 25. The cast included Keith Roberts, John Selya, Ashley Tuttle, Charlie Neshyba-Hodges, Holley Farmer, Laura Mead, Rika Okamoto and Karine Plantadit. The set design was by James Youmans, costumes by Katherine Roth, lighting by Donald Holder and sound by Peter McBoyle. Come Fly Away closed on September 5, 2010.

The songs are danced to the voice of Frank Sinatra, backed by 18 live instrumentalists arranged and produced by Dave Pierce, with additional vocals by either Hilary Gardner or Rosena Hill.

After the Broadway production, Twyla Tharp's Come Fly Away re-opened in Las Vegas at the Wynn Las Vegas resort under the new name SINATRA Dance With Me. Only a few changes were made from Broadway to Las Vegas. The show opened on December 11, 2010 as a limited engagement till April 30, 2011

== 2011 U.S. National Tour ==
Troika Entertainment presents the US National Tour of Come Fly Away, which started in August 2011 at the Fabulous Fox Theatre in Atlanta, Georgia. The tour reunites several cast members from the Broadway and Las Vegas productions, including John Selya, Matthew Stockwell Dibble, Cody Green, Laurie Kanyok, Marielys Molina and Ron Todorowski. The cast also includes Ashley Blair Fitzgerald, Martin Harvey, Ramona Kelley, Christopher Vo, Anthony Burrell, Mallauri Esquibel, Marina Lazzaretto, Meredith Miles, Marceea Moreno, Candy Olsen, Julius Anthony Rubio, Amy Ruggiero, Justin Urso, Tanairi Sade Vazquez, Chehon Wespi-Tschopp and Michael Williams. Cities include: Atlanta, Detroit, Chicago, Miami, Baltimore, Los Angeles, Hartford, Cleveland, and Toronto.

== Concept and background ==
Tharp has been choreographing Sinatra songs since the 1970s, including Nine Sinatra Songs, in 1982, and Sinatra Suite, in 1984, featuring Mikhail Baryshnikov. The new piece includes some of her earlier choreography.

Come Fly Away, set in a New York City nightclub, follows the relationships of four dancing couples as they seek love and romance. "The pas de deux as a flirtatious battle of wills is a recurring theme in 'Come Fly Away,' which is structured as a series of romantic encounters in a club vaguely redolent of the 1940s." Kate and Hank resolve their ambiguous, tempestuous relationship by becoming "just friends". Marty and Betsy are innocent and shy. Slim and Chanos have a one-night affair, and Babe and Sid circle each other as they each seek to be the center of attention.

Tharp put a full band on stage and a singer, Hilary Gardner, who sang duets with Sinatra recordings.

== Songs ==
Act 1

- Moonlight Becomes You (Lyrics By Johnny Burke, Music By Jimmy Van Heusen)
- Come Fly With Me (Lyrics By Sammy Cahn, Music By Jimmy Van Heusen)
- I've Got the World on a String (Lyrics By Ted Koehler, Music By Harold Arlen)
- Let's Fall in Love (Music and Lyrics By Ted Koehler and Harold Arlen)
- I've Got You Under My Skin (Cole Porter)
- Summer Wind (Lyrics By Johnny Mercer, Music By Henry Mayer and Hans Bradtke)
- Fly Me to the Moon (Bart Howard)
- I've Got a Crush on You (Lyrics By Ira Gershwin, Music By George Gershwin)
- Body and Soul (Music and Lyrics By Frank Eyton, Johnny Green, Edward Heyman and Robert Sour)
- It's All Right with Me (Porter)
- You Make Me Feel So Young (Lyrics By Mack Gordon, Music By Josef Joe Myrow)
- September of My Years (Lyrics By Sammy Cahn, Music By Jimmy Van Heusen)
- Witchcraft (Lyrics By Carolyn Leigh, Music By Cy Coleman)
- Yes Sir, That's My Baby (Lyrics By Gus Kahn, Music By Walter Donaldson)
- Learnin' the Blues (Music and Lyrics By Dolores "Vicki" Silvers
- That's Life (Music and Lyrics By Dean Kay and Kelly L. Gordon)
- Nice 'n' Easy (Lyrics By Alan and Marilyn Bergman, Music By Lew Spence)
- Makin' Whoopee (Lyrics By Gus Kahn, Music By Walter Donaldson)
- Jumpin' at the Woodside (Lyrics By Jon Hendricks, Music By Count Basie)

Act 2

- Saturday Night Is the Loneliest Night (Lyrics By Sammy Cahn, Music By Jule Styne)
- I'm Gonna Live 'Til I Die (Music and Lyrics By Al Hoffman, Walter Kent and Manny Kurtz)
- Pick Yourself Up (Lyrics By Dorothy Fields, Music By Jerome Kern)
- "Wave" (Music and Lyrics By Antonio Carlos Jobim)
- Let's Face the Music and Dance (Music and Lyrics By Irving Berlin)
- Teach Me Tonight (Lyrics By Sammy Cahn, Music By Gene de Paul)
- Take Five (Music and Lyrics By Paul Desmond)
- Just Friends (Lyrics By Sam M. Lewis, Music By John Klenner)
- Lean Baby (Lyrics By Roy Alfred, Music By Billy May)
- Makin' Whoopee (Reprise)(Lyrics By Gus Kahn, Music By Walter Donaldson)
- One for My Baby (Lyrics By Johnny Mercer, Music By Harold Arlen)
- My Funny Valentine (Music and Lyrics By Richard Rodgers and Lorenz Hart)
- Air Mail Special (Music By Benny Goodman, Jimmy Mundy and Charles Christian)
- My Way (Lyrics By Paul Anka and Gilles Thibault, Music By Claude François and Jacques Revaux )
- New York, New York (Lyrics By Fred Ebb, Music By John Kander)
- All the Way (Lyrics By Sammy Cahn, Music By Jimmy Van Heusen)

== Response ==
Reviews were mostly positive. In The New York Times, Charles Isherwood opined: "A sleek, energizing mixture of Sinatra's inimitable cool and Ms. Tharp's kinetic heat, "Come Fly Away" sweeps you up in a spell so complete that only those resistant to the seductions of dance or the swing of Sinatra will be left on the other side of the velvet rope." The USA Today reviewer was even more enthusiastic: "It's hard to imagine a Broadway show delivering a more dazzling combination of talent ... this homage features the spine-tingling arrangements of Sinatra's best-loved recordings, zestfully revived by an expert live band. Tharp's dancers, too – playing couples who grapple with that tender trap called love – mix technical prowess with a visceral punch that can be as playful as it is poignant." The Village Voice raved: "And what performers!"

However, New York Times dance writer Alastair Macaulay disagreed with his colleague Isherwood. He called the choreograph "less sensational than sensationalistic ... this is intimacy perverted into exhibitionism." He also wrote, "Some of the individual dances in the Tharp show are good or better than that, but the context stops making them look good: they're miscast or they're wasted in this undramatic clubland non-event." The Variety reviewer also found that the "dance revue only intermittently gets off the ground." Natasha Jibladze of the Georgia Post described the production as "Very interesting and moving performance."

== Awards and nominations ==
=== Original Broadway production ===
Year	Award ceremony	Category	Nominee	Result
2010	Tony Award	Best Featured Actress in a Musical	Karine Plantadit	Nominated
2010	Tony Award	Best Choreography	Twyla Tharp	Nominated
2010	Drama Desk Award	Outstanding Choreography	Twyla Tharp	Won
2010	Outer Critics Circle Award	Outstanding New Broadway Musical		Nominated
2010	Drama League Award	Distinguished Production of a Musical		Nominated
2010	Astaire Award	Outstanding Male Dancer in a Broadway Show	Charlie Neshyba-Hodges	Won
2010	Astaire Award	Outstanding Male Dancer in a Broadway Show	John Selya	Nominated
2010	Astaire Award	Outstanding Male Dancer in a Broadway Show	Keith Roberts	Nominated
2010	Astaire Award	Outstanding Female Dancer in a Broadway Show	Holley Farmer	Nominated
2010	Astaire Award	Outstanding Female Dancer in a Broadway Show	Laura Read	Nominated
2010	Astaire Award	Outstanding Female Dancer in a Broadway Show	Karine Plantadit	Nominated
2010	Astaire Award	Outstanding Choreographer in a Broadway Show	Twyla Tharp	Nominated
