= Sylvia Yu Friedman =

Sylvia Yu Friedman is a Hong Kong–based Canadian author, journalist, film-maker, philanthropy adviser and anti-slavery campaigner. She is best known for her work on Japanese military sex slavery before and during World War II.

== Biography ==
Friedman was born in South Korea and grew up in Canada. Her book Silenced No More: Voices of Comfort Women features interviews with elderly Chinese, Korean, Taiwanese, Dutch and Filipino survivors of Japanese military sex slavery, as well as three former Japanese soldiers who admitted to their wrongdoings and became part of an international movement to help survivors.

She has written a series of articles for the South China Morning Post exposing various forms of modern slavery and human trafficking.

In 2013, she won the English-Language Television Merits prize at Hong Kong's 18th Human Rights Press Awards for her three-part documentary series on human trafficking in China, Hong Kong and Thailand.

Her film From Darkness to Hope: Transformation of an Ex-Trafficker won an award at the 2020 White Unicorn International Film Festival and was named best documentary at the 7th Indian Cine Film Festival.

In the summer of 2016, alongside her husband, Matthew S. Friedman, she delivered presentations on the topic of human trafficking across 17 US states to 112 organisations, including Bank of America and Disney.

Friedman is listed as a SheSource expert in the database of the Women's Media Center.

She also authored the biography Heart and Soul: The Life Story of Pastor Augustus Chao.
