= The Singing Bee (American game show) =

- Title screen.
- Created by: Philip Gurin; Robert Horowitz
- Based on: Sing it Back: Lyric Champion! owned by Zeal Entertainment Television
- Directed by: R. Brian DiPirro (Season 1) Glenn Weiss (Season 2); Alan Carter (2009–2012)
- Presented by: Joey Fatone; Melissa Peterman
- Starring: Steve Dorff and the Bee Hive, CMT; Ray Chew and the Groove, NBC; The Honey Bees, NBC
- Country of origin: United States
- Original language: English
- No. of seasons: 5
- No. of episodes: 66

Production
- Executive producers: Philip Gurin; Robert Horowitz; For CMT: Bob Kusbit; John Hamlin; Claire McCabe; Jayson Dinsmore
- Production locations: CBS Studio Center, Studio City California (2007–2012); CBS Television City, Los Angeles (2009–2011)
- Production companies: Juma Entertainment; The Gurin Company

Original release
- Network: NBC
- Release: July 10 – December 28, 2007
- Network: CMT
- Release: June 16, 2009 – July 23, 2012

The Singing Bee is a sing-along game show that originally aired on NBC and then CMT. Combining karaoke singing with a spelling bee-style competition, this show features contestants trying to remember the lyrics to popular songs. Originally slated to begin with a six-episode season during late 2007, it launched early in reaction to Fox's competing Don't Forget the Lyrics!

== Format ==
As mentioned, at the start of the show, the band plays a song and the host "randomly" gives audience members a chance to sing part of the song. If they sing it correctly, they become one of the contestants on the show. This part of the show is actually staged, and the contestants are preselected. During this part of the program, you can sometimes see (as the contestants run up to the stage) that the lyrics for the song are being scrolled on a banner over the stage so that the preselected contestants do not make a mistake.

=== Round 1 ===
The host would provide the year the song was released, the performer, and the name of the song. A portion of the song is performed, and then the contestant has to attempt to sing the next line of the song. If correct, they advance to the next round, and a new song is introduced, which the next contestant in line must attempt; if not, they have to step back, and the next person in line tries the same song. A song is thrown out if none of the remaining contestants get the lyrics correct. The first four people (three people in season two) who get a song lyric correct move on to the second round, and any contestant who has not had a chance loses and returns on a future episode.

=== Round 2 ===
The contestants who advanced go up in pairs to play a mini-game. The winner of the game advances to the championship round. In the CMT version, all four contestants play 3 mini-games for points, the two players with the most points moves on to the Chorus Showdown.

- "Scrambled Lyrics" (Renamed Random Shuffle): To play "Scrambled Lyrics", while the band is performing, words from the next line are shown scrambled on screen. The contestant is required to sing the line in its correct order. When one contestant is correct and the other is wrong at any point, the one who was correct moves on to the Championship Round. On the CMT Version, each correct answer is worth five points.
- "Karaoke Challenge": To play "Karaoke Challenge", while the band is performing, the contestant sees the words to the song in karaoke fashion. As the contestant sings the song, he or she will also see blanks, each representing a word in the song. The player who fills in the most blanks correctly (out of a possible 15) wins and goes on to the Championship Round. This round is similar to FOX's Don't Forget the Lyrics! because the contestant is the lead singer in this round. In the CMT version, each blank is worth two points (30 maximum).
- "Blind Start": To play "Blind Start", the band plays the beginning notes of a song. When the band stops, the contestant must sing the opening line correctly. One of the three contestants is eliminated from the second round.
- "Playlist": To play "Playlist", the three contestants are given 6 categories of song which have comical titles. Whichever two contestants have the most points after the 6 songs move on to the next round.
- "Singing with the Enemy": To play "Singing With The Enemy", the band plays part of a popular song. The first contestant must do the next line when the band stops playing. The band then picks up with the line the contestant said and stops. The next contestant continues on with the song. This goes through 3 passes. The two with the highest score move on. On the CMT version, up to 15 points are possible.

=== Chorus Showdown ===
This follows a similar format to the first round, but instead of singing a line, the contestant is required to sing the entire chorus without mistakes from the song performed. If both are correct or incorrect (sometimes after two rounds), then they go to a tiebreaker, where they are given the year and the name of the performer and the first person to buzz in will be given the option of singing or passing. If the singer is correct, they win. If the singer is wrong, the other contestant wins.

The winner moves on to the Final Countdown.

In the CMT version, Peterman gives the year, artist, but not the name of the song just yet. Then, the contestant in the lead gets the choice to play that song or pass it, then they give the name of the song.

=== The Final Countdown ===
In the NBC version, Ray Chew introduces this concluding round by announcing in song: "It's the Final Countdown!" Up to 7 songs are performed in a similar manner to the first round, but the contestant knows nothing about the song, (artist, title, year) and thus must use the lyrics in order to win the big money. For each song lyric that is sung correctly, the player wins $5,000. If the player gets five right, then they win $50,000. However, if they sing a lyric incorrectly, a strike is given. If three strikes are given at any point, the game is over, but the contestant still wins whatever money was accumulated up to that point. Beginning in the second season, the winning contestant also defends as champion title to face three more challengers. On the new CMT version of the show, correctly guessing a song earns $500, and getting five wins $10,000.

=== Changes for One-Hour Shows ===
The above format is the standard for a 30-minute episode of the show.

In a one-hour show, several changes are made:

- There are two qualifying games.
  - In each game, six players (only 5 for season 2) are picked from the audience to play Round 1, however, the first three to complete a lyric (only 5 for season 2) advance.
  - The three players then compete in a Round 2 game. Play continues, including a tie-breaker if needed, until one player remains. In season 2, three rounds are played until three contestants are eliminated.
- The two survivors of the qualifying games play the Chorus Showdown, the last player standing plays The Final Countdown.
- Beginning on August 21, in between some breaks, host Fatone goes into the audience to give an audience member a chance at $500. A question about a song is asked, and if the player gets it right they win the money. On December 28, two audience members were challenged to the same lyrics. The contestant who will wait is given headphones so that they cannot hear the other contestant until the song is completed. If both contestants are correct, both win $500. If only one is correct, that contestant wins $1,000.

== Seasons ==
Season	Episodes	Originally released		
Season	Episodes	First released	Last released	Network
1	18	July 10, 2007	December 28, 2007	NBC
2	10	June 16, 2009	August 15, 2009	CMT
3	18	January 22, 2010	August 20, 2010	CMT
4	10	April 8, 2011	June 17, 2011	CMT
5	10	April 20, 2012	July 23, 2012	CMT

=== Cast timeline ===
Color key

Host
Vocals
Guitar
Piano
Bass
Drums

Cast member	Seasons				
Cast member	1	2	3	4	5
Joey Fatone	●				
Melissa Peterman		●	●	●	●
Jared Johnson		●	●	●	●
Bobby Tomberlin		●	●	●	●
Kim Parent		●	●	●	●
Roger Cain		●	●	●	●
Steve Dorff		●	●	●	●
Scotty Kormos		●	●	●	●
Tony Love		●	●	●	●
Jeff Vincent		●	●	●	
Kenley Shea		●			
Paula MacNeill			●	●	●
Kimmy Keyes		●	●		
Storm Lee		●	●		
Baylie Brown				●	
Beau Davidson				●	●
Danielle Lauderdale					●

== Broadcast history ==
The Singing Bee premiered with a half-hour episode on July 10, 2007 at 9:30pm Eastern/8:30pm Central, beating Don't Forget the Lyrics! to the air by one day. The premiere episode was repeated the following night, July 11, 2007, at 8:30pm Eastern/7:30pm Central. On NBC, it was hosted by Joey Fatone. The house band, The Groove, was led by Ray Chew and features: Deanna Johnston, Paula MacNeill, Wes Quave, Tom Sartori, Storm Lee, Kelli Sae, Jeschelle Magbitang, Carmen Carter, Kara Shaw, Leah Shaffer, Karen Ashe, Christopher "C.J." Emmons, Vann Johnson and Chris "Breeze" Barczynski. Dancing to the band are the house dancers, The Honeybees: Ferly Prado Dunn, Monique Cash, Holly Cruikshank, and Lisa Byrne.

Melissa Peterman hosted the CMT version. The house band, Steve Dorff and the Bee Hive, also featured: Roger Cain, Scotty Kormos, Tony Love, and Jeff Vincent. The singers were Jared Johnson, Baylie Brown, Beau Davidson, Paula MacNeill, Kim Parent, and Bobby Tomberlin.

In each episode, six contestants (four contestants in season two) will be selected from the audience to play a series of games that test their knowledge of song lyrics. If a contestant makes an error, he or she will forfeit their chance to get into the "musical chairs". If a contestant is not in a musical chair when the round is over, he or she is eliminated.

In a promo for the show's launch, NBC revived their original 1983 slogan "Be There" as "Bee There".

Due to low ratings, and to make room for The Biggest Loser, NBC put The Singing Bee on hiatus for November sweeps. The Singing Bee returned on December 21, 2007, and aired two new episodes each Friday, before being placed on hiatus again. On April 2, 2008, NBC announced its schedule for the 2008–2009 television season. The Singing Bee was left off this list and is officially canceled. A spin-off of the show, The Singing Office, debuted on June 29, 2008, hosted by Fatone and Mel B and airing on TLC.

On April 29, 2009, CMT confirmed that it would revive the series in the summer of 2009 with Melissa Peterman as host. The Singing Bee premiered on CMT on June 20 and aired Saturday at 9pm. Melissa Peterman confirmed the show was renewed for another season on August 24, 2009. In November 2010, CMT reportedly picked up the show for a third season. The show's last episode aired on July 23, 2012.

=== Ratings ===
The first episode premiered with 13.1 million viewers. It was the biggest summer premiere since ABC's premiere of Dancing with the Stars. The debut episode finished second for the week of July 9–15, 2007, by an extremely close margin. The number one program, the 2007 MLB All-Star Game, beat "Bee" with an 8.4 rating, to the game show's 8.1

However, The Singing Bee hit an all-time low in the ratings with a 1.7 rating, on October 30, 2007. On December 28, 2007, the show scored a 3.7/7 rating, and came in second place behind Ghost Whisperer, before NBC announced its cancellation. The show would eventually be revived by CMT in 2009, running until 2012.

== International versions ==
Currently airing franchise
Franchise no longer in production

Region/Country	Local name	Network	Main presenter	Date aired
Australia	The Singing Bee	Nine Network	Joey Fatone (2007); Tim Campbell (2008–2010)	October 7, 2007 – 2010
Belgium	Singing Bee	vtm	Walter Grootaers	2008
Chile	HIT, la fiebre del karaoke	Canal 13	Sergio Lagos	January 2, 2008 – March 2008
Colombia	Dígalo cantando	Caracol TV	Guillermo Vives	2007–2008
Denmark	Magi i luften	TV3	Robert Hansen	February 2008
Ecuador	Dígalo cantando	TC Televisión	Sergio Sacoto and Pierina Uribe	2008
Finland	Biisikärpänen	MTV3	Sanna Hirvaskari, Lorenz Backman, Lari Halme, and Vexi Salmi	April 5, 2008 – December 17, 2011
Finland	Hittikärpänen	TV5	Roope Salminen and Sami Saari	September 7, 2015 – November 9, 2015
Germany	Singing Bee	ProSieben	Senna Gammour and Oliver Petszokat	September 9, 2008 – 2009
Greece	Θα πείς κι ένα τραγούδι Tha peís ki éna tragoúdi	Alpha TV	Andreas Mikroutsikos	2007–2008
Hungary	Popdaráló	TV2	Áron Kovács	March 14, 2008 – December 6, 2008
Iceland	Singing Bee	Skjár einn	Jón Jósep Snæbjörnsson	September 19, 2008
Indonesia	Happy Song (adaptation)	Indosiar	Choky Sitohang	April 27, 2009 – April 25, 2011
Indonesia	The Singing Bee Indonesia (official franchise)	RCTI	Ananda Omesh	December 14, 2022 – August 30, 2023
Israel	תשיר את זה; Tashir et zeh	Channel 2	Assi Azar	2008–2009
Italy	Chi fermerà la musica	Rai Uno	Pupo	December 16, 2007 – February 22, 2008
Japan	Singing Bee	Fuji TV		2010
Jordan	غنيها صح; Ghaniha Sah	Ro'ya TV	Haitham Baroudi	May 2019
Lebanon	طنة وغنة; Tanneh wo ghanneh	Future TV	Razan Moghrabi	September 2012
Morocco	فاصلة; Fasilah	2M	Imad El Natifi	2005 – September 2007
Netherlands	Singing Bee	RTL 4	Gordon Heuckeroth	December 31, 2007 – July 26, 2008
New Zealand	The Singing Bee NZ	TVNZ 2	Jordan Vandermade	September 13, 2008
Norway	Singing Bee	TV3	Åge Sten Nilsen	2008
Philippines	The Singing Bee	ABS-CBN	Cesar Montano	April 21, 2008 – February 6, 2010
Philippines	The Singing Bee	ABS-CBN	Amy Perez and Roderick Paulate	November 16, 2013 – February 6, 2015
Portugal	Chamar a Música	SIC	Herman José; João Manzarra	May 18, 2008 – 2011
Romania	O-la-la	Pro TV	Andra	October 18, 2008
Romania	Za Za Sing	Antena 1	Liviu Vârciu	April 5, 2017
Russia	Можешь? Спой! Mozhesh? Spoy!	Perviy Kanal	Dmitry Shepelev	July 12, 2008 – December 28, 2008
Spain	Al pie de la letra	Antena 3	Javier Estrada	December 25, 2007 – January 9, 2009
Sweden	Singing Bee	TV3	Hanna Hedlund	January 13, 2008 – December 3, 2009
Turkey	Singing Bee	Show TV		
Ukraine	Зірка караоке Zirka karaoke	Novyi Kanal	Dmitry Shepelev	March 9, 2008 – December 31, 2008
United Kingdom	Sing It Back: Lyric Champion*	ITV	Jason King and Joel Ross	July 7, 2007

*Prior to the premiere of the American version, British Network ITV had its own version of the show titled Sing It Back: Lyric Champion. 2M TV in Morocco already had their own version of the show since 2005, called Fasilah, but since September 2007 they changed the rules into that of the American version.
