= Marion Louise Pooke =

American artist 1883-1975

- Born: 1883; Natick, Massachusetts
- Died: 1975 (aged 91–92); Paris, France
- Other name: Marion Pooke Duits
- Known for: Painting

Marion Louise Pooke (1883–1975) was an American artist known for her portrait painting.

Pooke was born in Natick, Massachusetts in 1883. She studied at Smith College, the Massachusetts Normal Art School and the School of the Museum of Fine Arts, Boston. at the Museum of Fine Arts, Boston she studied with Edmund C. Tarbell and Frank Weston Benson.

Pooke taught art at the Abbot Academy and the Walnut Hill School from 1914 through 1923. In 2015 she exhibited at Panama–Pacific International Exposition. Her painting Silhouettes received a silver medal. She was a member of the National Association of Women Painters and Sculptors.

In 1923 she married the art dealer Bernard Duits, with whom she had one child. The couple settled in Paris.

She died in 1975 in Paris, France.
