= Jerome Robbins' Broadway =

- Original cast recording released by RCA Victor
- Music: Various
- Lyrics: Various
- Productions: 1989 Broadway
- Awards: Tony Award for Best Musical

Jerome Robbins' Broadway is an anthology comprising musical numbers from shows that were either directed or choreographed by Jerome Robbins. The shows represented include, for example, The King and I, On the Town and West Side Story. Robbins won his fifth Tony Award for direction.

== Production ==
The show opened on Broadway on February 26, 1989 at the Imperial Theatre and closed on September 1, 1990 after 633 performances and 55 previews. Directed and choreographed by Jerome Robbins with Grover Dale as co-director, the cast featured Jason Alexander as the narrator, Charlotte d'Amboise, Faith Prince, Debbie Shapiro, Susann Fletcher and Scott Wise.

With an elaborate production and a cast of 62, the show reportedly cost US$8 million to produce, and was expected to recoup about 40 percent from the New York run, according to Bernard B. Jacobs (President of the Shubert Organization). "In a season that was so bereft of original musicals that Kenny Loggins on Broadway and Barry Manilow at the Gershwin were categorized as such, this reminder of Broadway's glory days was greeted with relief and rejoicing (and six Tony Awards). It featured extended sequences from West Side Story and Fiddler on the Roof."

== Musical numbers ==
Sources: Internet Broadway Data Base; MasterWorks Broadway

Act I

- "Gotta Dance" (from Look, Ma, I'm Dancin'!)
- "Papa, Won't You Dance With Me?" (from High Button Shoes)
- "Shall We Dance?" (from The King and I)
- "New York, New York" (from On the Town)
- "Sailors on the Town" (from On the Town)
- "Ya Got Me" (from On the Town)
- "Charleston" (from Billion Dollar Baby)
- "Comedy Tonight" (from A Funny Thing Happened on the Way to the Forum)
- "I Still Get Jealous" (from High Button Shoes)
- "Suite of Dances" (from West Side Story)

Act II

- "The Small House of Uncle Thomas" (from The King and I)
- "You Gotta Have a Gimmick" (from Gypsy)
- "I'm Flying" (from Peter Pan)
- "On a Sunday by the Sea" (from High Button Shoes)
- "Mr. Monotony" (from Miss Liberty)
- "Tradition"; The Dream; "Sunrise, Sunset"; Wedding Dance (from Fiddler on the Roof)
- "Some Other Time" (from On the Town)
- "New York, New York" (Reprise)
- "Finale" from On the Town

== Awards and nominations ==
=== Original Broadway production ===
Sources: Playbill.com; InfoPlease

| Year | Award | Category | Nominee | Result |
|---|---|---|---|---|
| 1989 | Tony Award | Best Musical | | Won |
| 1989 | Tony Award | Best Direction of a Musical | Jerome Robbins | Won |
| 1989 | Tony Award | Best Performance by a Leading Actor in a Musical | Jason Alexander | Won |
| 1989 | Tony Award | Best Performance by a Leading Actor in a Musical | Robert La Fosse | Nominated |
| 1989 | Tony Award | Best Performance by a Leading Actress in a Musical | Charlotte d'Amboise | Nominated |
| 1989 | Tony Award | Best Performance by a Featured Actor in a Musical | Scott Wise | Won |
| 1989 | Tony Award | Best Performance by a Featured Actress in a Musical | Jane Lanier | Nominated |
| 1989 | Tony Award | Best Performance by a Featured Actress in a Musical | Faith Prince | Nominated |
| 1989 | Tony Award | Best Performance by a Featured Actress in a Musical | Debbie Shapiro | Won |
| 1989 | Tony Award | Best Lighting Design | Jennifer Tipton | Won |
| 1989 | Drama Desk Award | Outstanding Musical | | Won |
| 1989 | Drama Desk Award | Outstanding Actor in a Musical | Jason Alexander | Won |
| 1989 | Drama Desk Award | Outstanding Actor in a Musical | Scott Wise | Nominated |
| 1989 | Drama Desk Award | Outstanding Actress in a Musical | Faith Prince | Nominated |
| 1989 | Drama Desk Award | Outstanding Actress in a Musical | Debbie Shapiro | Nominated |
| 1989 | Drama Desk Award | Outstanding Lighting Design | Jennifer Tipton | Won |
