= Kyle Martin (musician) =

American actor, musician

Kyle Martin is a nationally renowned musician, piano player and singer originally from Sacramento, California and now resides in Las Vegas, Nevada. He is best known for his role as the "Piano Man" in the Billy Joel/Twyla Tharp Broadway musical, Movin' Out, during the 2007–2009 National Tour. Kyle has since led the band, JOEL, a Billy Joel tribute band, opening for George Thorogood, playing for Disney Parks, the Catalina Wine Mixer, the SF Giants, The World Senior Games, along with many theaters, festivals and wineries across the country.

In 2020, Kyle relocated from Sacramento, California to Las Vegas, Nevada and opened his own residency called, "Kyle Martin's Piano Man," which resides at the V Theater located near Planet Hollywood. "Kyle Martin"s Piano Man" was the first show to open post-COVID in Las Vegas and opened to rave reviews and critical acclaim. "Kyle Martin's Piano Man" is produced by Kyle Martin, Johnny Stuart (of Legends in Concert fame), and Blair Farrington (BAZ). Kyle is currently working on multiple projects currently in pre-production on the Las Vegas Strip.

Kyle has performed with artists such as Jaci Velasquez, Rachael Lampa, Stacie Orrico, Natalie Grant, and Rosey Grier. He was also the singing voice for Bibleman in the 2006/2007 Live Tour.

Kyle has been a certified Speech Level Singing instructor, the vocal method founded by Seth Riggs. He joined VocalizeU in 2010 and was board member for Vocology in Practice from 2015-2020. He owns VoiceWire, LLC, an online-only Fine Arts, Artist Development and Singing Lessons firm working with artists internationally.
