= Debbie Gravitte =

American actress and singer

- Occupations: Singer, actress
- Spouse: Beau Gravitte
- Children: 3
- Website: debbiegravitte.com

Debbie Gravitte is an American actress and singer.

== Career ==
Gravitte made her Broadway debut in the chorus of They're Playing Our Song in 1979. She performed on Broadway in Blues in the Night in 1982; Zorba in 1983; Les Misérables as Fantine replacement, 1994; and Chicago as Matron "Mama" Morton replacement in 2003.

In 1989 she appeared in Jerome Robbins' Broadway, for which she won the Tony Award for Best Featured Actress in a Musical. She was nominated for the Drama Desk Award. She was nominated for the 1981 Drama Desk Award, Outstanding Featured Actress in a Musical, for the Frank Loesser revue Perfectly Frank (1990).

She has appeared in several Encores! staged concerts at New York City Center, including Carnival (2002), The Boys from Syracuse (1997) and Tenderloin (2000).

Her solo album Part of Your World celebrates the songs of Alan Menken, and she is featured on the recording Unsung Sondheim.

She was a member of the regular cast of the short-lived 1988 television situation comedy Trial and Error. Her only other screen credit is the 2000 Jacqueline Susann biopic Isn't She Great, in which she portrayed singer Eydie Gormé.

On October 27, 2012, Gravitte starred in the Broadway-style musical Loving the Silent Tears, which premiered in Los Angeles, California.

On November 11, 2019, Gravitte starred as the narrator in the Off-Broadway revival of Over Here! at The Triad Theatre in New York City with direction by Will Nunziata and music direction by Blake Allen. The production also starred Haley Swindal as Pauline, Jessica Hendy as Paulette, and Nikka Graff Lanzarone as Mitzi the Nazi.

In April 2026, Gravitte started a run as Polly in the Broadway musical Just in Time, replacing Michele Pawk.

She performs in concerts, including with the National Symphony with Marvin Hamlisch, the Boston Pops, the Atlanta Symphony, the Cleveland Orchestra, the Pittsburgh Symphony, the Utah Symphony, St. Lous, Houston, and San Diego Symphonies.

== Personal life ==
She is married to actor/singer Beau Gravitte; the couple has three children. The Bay Area Reporter noted: "Being at home to rear her three children with actor husband Beau Gravitte was a big reason she turned to the life of a traveling concert performer, with big at-home gaps built into the schedule."
