= Scott Wise =

American actor and dancer

- Born: Scott Wise; October 30, 1958 (age 68); Pocatello, Idaho, U.S.
- Occupations: Actor & Dancer
- Spouses: Kiel Junius (divorced); Elizabeth Parkinson(divorced) ()
- Children: Elizabeth Wise, James Wise

Scott Wise (born October 30, 1958) is an American theatre actor and dancer. He is known for his performances in the 1989 musical Jerome Robbins' Broadway, which earned him a Tony Award, and in the 2002 film Chicago.

Wise was nominated for three Tony Awards (winning one), two Drama Desk Awards, an Outer Critics Circle Award, and a Helen Hayes Award in his career.

== Life and career ==
Wise was born in Pocatello, Idaho, and grew up near Spokane, Washington, living briefly in Provo, Utah.

Although a life-trained dancer, Wise first became seriously interested in dance as a career while studying to become an accountant at the University of Idaho at Moscow. He performed with the Joffrey II, then moved into musical theater in the early 1980s after auditioning for A Chorus Line "as a dare more than anything."

Wise won the Tony Award in 1989 in the category of Best Featured Actor in a Musical for his performance in the dance revue Jerome Robbins' Broadway. In that revue, Wise played multiple roles, including "Riff" in West Side Story and "Chip" in On the Town. Wise was nominated twice more in the same category for his performances in State Fair (1996) and Fosse (1999).

In addition to playing the Drill Sergeant and Sergeant O'Leary in the rock ballet, Movin' Out (2002), Wise was Twyla Tharp's assistant choreographer and assistant director. Wise choreographed the Off-Broadway musical A Class Act in 2000. a regional production of The Who's Tommy and the national tour of Leader of the Pack.

=== Personal life ===
Wise was married to dancer Elizabeth Parkinson, with whom he has a son. His daughter, actress Savannah Wise, is from his first marriage, to dancer and choreographer Kiel Junius.

In October 2006, Wise and Parkinson opened their studio, FineLine Theatre Arts, in New Milford, Connecticut.

He is currently an adjunct professor at Western Connecticut State University.

== Stage credits ==
Source:Playbill Vault

- 1982 A Chorus Line
- 1984 Cats
- 1985 Song and Dance
- 1988 Carrie
- 1989 Jerome Robbins' Broadway
- 1992 Guys and Dolls
- 1993 The Goodbye Girl
- 1994 Damn Yankees
- 1995 Victor/Victoria
- 1996 State Fair
- 1997 Lucky in the Rain (Goodspeed Opera House)
- 1999 Fosse
- 2002 Movin' Out
- 2015 Allegiance
