= Matthew Friedman (musician) =

American musician, singer and performer

Matthew Friedman is an American musician, singer and performer.

== Early life and education ==
Friedman is from New York. His family has several other musicians, including three of his siblings. He attended Haverford College (1986–1987), then transferred to Hofstra University, where he graduated with a B.A. in Liberal Arts. Matthew was the student director of the Hofstra University Vocal Jazz Chorus, under the supervision of Professor David Lalama. He also played piano for the University Jazz Band, and founded the University Fusion Jazz Ensemble. Matthew also studied extensively with Herbert Deutsch, chairman of the electronic music department and co-creator of the Moog Synthesizer. He continued his education at Hofstra Law School, where he was awarded a J.D. in 1994. He was selected to write for the Entertainment Law Journal.

== Career ==
Friedman played the role of the Piano Man in the First National Touring Company of the Billy Joel–Twyla Tharp musical, MOVIN' OUT. He served the same role in the show's Second and Third National Tours. Friedman left his job as an attorney to take the Piano Man role.

Following MOVIN’ OUT, Friedman played keyboards for the Broadway production of JERSEY BOYS (2009–2017), and keyboards and guitar for the off-Broadway revival of SMOKEY JOE’S CAFE (2018).

As a songwriter, Friedman has been selected twice as a featured artist at the Alternative Torch Concert Series where Broadway performers play their original compositions. With the Friedman Brothers Band, which also features three of his siblings, he plays and records his original songs. In addition to piano, Friedman plays acoustic and 12-string guitars and bass guitar.

Matthew has his own wedding and corporate event band, Matthew Friedman & Stiletto, which he founded in 2011. The band also performs as a Billy Joel and Elton John tribute act (focusing on authenticity of the music and less so on the costumes).

Additionally, Matthew has been performing as a dueling pianist since 2013, primarily for Shake, Rattle & Roll Pianos, and also for several additional regional agencies. He performs all over the eastern seaboard, from Virginia to Canada.
