= Movin' Out (musical) =

2002 jukebox musical by Twyla Tharp

- Original Broadway Logo
- Music: Billy Joel
- Lyrics: Billy Joel
- Premiere: June 25, 2002: Shubert Theatre, Chicago
- Productions: 2002 Chicago; 2002 Broadway; 2004 North American Tour; 2006 West End

Movin' Out is a 2002 jukebox musical featuring the songs of Billy Joel. Conceived and created by Twyla Tharp, the musical tells the story of a generation of American youth growing up on Long Island during the 1960s and their experiences with the Vietnam War. The principal characters are drawn from those who appeared in various Joel tunes: high school sweethearts Brenda and Eddie ("Scenes from an Italian Restaurant"), James ("James"), Judy ("Why Judy Why"), Sergeant O'Leary and Tony (Anthony in "Movin' Out"). The show diverts from the traditional musical in that it essentially is a series of dances linked by a thin plot, and none of the dancers sing. Instead, all the vocals are performed by a pianist (the "Piano Man", representing Billy Joel) and band suspended on a platform above the stage while the dancers act out the songs' lyrics, basically making the show a rock ballet.

== Productions ==
In 2000, Tharp approached Joel for permission to create the show, presenting him with a 20-minute concept video featuring the show's eventual Broadway cast. Joel was enthusiastic about it, but kept his involvement thereafter to a minimum. The show started in pre-Broadway try-outs at the Shubert Theatre in Chicago from June 25, 2002, through September 1, 2002. The Chicago production was negatively received, and Tharp made extensive revisions to the show's first act, with some suggestions from Joel.

It premiered on Broadway at the Richard Rodgers Theatre on October 24, 2002, to more positive reviews, and closed on December 11, 2005, after 1,303 performances and 28 previews. Directed and choreographed by Tharp, the cast included Michael Cavanaugh (Piano Man), Darren Holden (replacement Piano Man), Wade Preston (alternate Piano Man), Elizabeth Parkinson (Brenda), John Selya (Eddie), Keith Roberts (Tony), Henry Haid (understudy Piano Man), Ashley Tuttle (Judy), Benjamin G. Bowman (James), and Scott Wise (Sergeant O'Leary/Drill Sergeant).

The first national tour of Movin' Out ran for three years, opening on January 27, 2004, and closing on January 21, 2007, after 1,111 performances. The tour also played to generally excellent reviews and full houses in 82 U.S. cities, and also ran in Canada in December 2005. It featured numerous dancers from the original Broadway production, who rotated in and out as schedules allowed. Darren Holden was the primary lead Piano Man and star for the entire run of the tour, understudied by Matt Wilson (2004), Charlie Neshyba-Hodges (2004), James Fox (2005) and Matthew Friedman (2006). Holly Cruikshank, in the role of Brenda, won the 2005 Helen Hayes Award for Outstanding Lead Actress in a Non-Resident Production.

The West End production opened on April 10, 2006, at London's Apollo Victoria Theatre where, despite receiving mostly solid reviews, it ran for less than two months, closing on May 2, 2006. James Fox and Darren Reeves were the leads.

The show played Tokyo, Japan in the summer of 2006, with many of the first national tour's performers including Darren Holden in the lead role.

A second national tour opened in Atlantic City on June 14, 2007, with Matthew Friedman and Kyle Martin in the lead role of Piano Man.

A third National Tour opened in La Crosse, Wisconsin on November 4, 2008, with Matthew Friedman, Kyle Martin, and Jon Abrams in the lead role of Piano Man.

On October 15, 2002, a live cast recording was released featuring the 2002 original Broadway cast. It was a single CD featuring 30 tracks.

== Song list ==
Act I

- "Running on Ice" – Sergeant O'Leary (Chicago previews only)
- "It's Still Rock and Roll to Me" – Company (Not included on Soundtrack)
- "Scenes from an Italian Restaurant" – Brenda, Eddie, Tony, James, Judy, Sergeant O'Leary and Ensemble
- "Movin' Out (Anthony's Song)" – Tony, Eddie, James and Sergeant O'Leary
- "Reverie (Villa D'Este)" (instrumental) / "Just the Way You Are" – James, Judy and Ensemble
- "The Longest Time" / "Uptown Girl" – Brenda, Eddie, Tony and Ensemble
- "This Night" – Tony, Brenda and Ensemble
- "Summer, Highland Falls" – Eddie, Brenda, Tony and Ensemble
- "Waltz #1 (Nunley's Carousel)" (instrumental) – Tony, Eddie, James, Drill Sergeant and Ensemble
- "We Didn't Start the Fire" – Judy, Brenda, James, Tony, Eddie and Ensemble
- "She's Got a Way" – Tony, Brenda and Ensemble
- "The Stranger" – Judy and Ensemble
- "Piano Man" – Tony, James, Eddie, Drill Sergeant and Ensemble
- "Elegy (The Great Peconic)" (instrumental) – Judy, Brenda, Tony, Eddie, Drill Sergeant and Ensemble
- "And So It Goes" – Piano Man and Eddie (only done at limited shows)

Act II

- "Invention in C Minor" (instrumental) – Eddie and Ensemble
- "Angry Young Man" – Eddie and Ensemble
- "Big Shot" – Tony, Brenda and Ensemble
- "Big Man on Mulberry Street" – Tony, Brenda and Ensemble
- "Captain Jack" – Eddie and Ensemble
- "An Innocent Man" – Eddie and Ensemble
- "Pressure" – Judy, Eddie and Ensemble
- "Goodnight Saigon" – Eddie, Judy, James, Tony and Ensemble
- "Air (Dublinesque)" (instrumental) – Brenda
- "Shameless" – Brenda and Tony
- "James" – Judy and Eddie
- "The River of Dreams" / "Keeping the Faith" / "Only the Good Die Young" – Eddie and Ensemble
- "I've Loved These Days" – Tony, Brenda, Eddie and Ensemble
- "Scenes from an Italian Restaurant" (Reprise) – Full Company
- "New York State of Mind" – Piano Man and Band (Chicago previews only)

== Awards and nominations ==
=== Original Broadway production ===
Year	Award Ceremony	Category	Nominee	Result
2003	Tony Award	Best Musical		Nominated
2003	Tony Award	Best Performance by a Leading Actor in a Musical	John Selya	Nominated
2003	Tony Award	Best Performance by a Leading Actress in a Musical	Elizabeth Parkinson	Nominated
2003	Tony Award	Best Performance by a Featured Actor in a Musical	Michael Cavanaugh	Nominated
2003	Tony Award	Best Performance by a Featured Actor in a Musical	Keith Roberts	Nominated
2003	Tony Award	Best Performance by a Featured Actress in a Musical	Ashley Tuttle	Nominated
2003	Tony Award	Best Direction of a Musical	Twyla Tharp	Nominated
2003	Tony Award	Best Choreography	Twyla Tharp	Won
2003	Tony Award	Best Orchestrations	Billy Joel and Stuart Malina	Won
2003	Tony Award	Best Lighting Design	Donald Holder	Nominated
2003	Drama Desk Award	Outstanding Musical		Nominated
2003	Drama Desk Award	Outstanding Actor in a Musical	John Selya	Nominated
2003	Drama Desk Award	Outstanding Actress in a Musical	Elizabeth Parkinson	Nominated
2003	Drama Desk Award	Outstanding Director of a Musical	Twyla Tharp	Nominated
2003	Drama Desk Award	Outstanding Choreography	Twyla Tharp	Won
2003	Drama Desk Award	Outstanding Lighting Design	Donald Holder	Nominated
2003	Theatre World Award		John Selya	Won
