= Michael Cavanaugh (musician) =

American musician and actor (born 1972)

- Born: August 21, 1972 (age 54); Cleveland, Ohio, United States
- Occupations: Actor; musician; singer
- Instruments: Vocals; piano
- Years active: 1999–present
- Website: michaelcavanaugh.com

Michael Cavanaugh (born August 21, 1972) is an American actor and musician most famous for playing the piano and providing lead vocals in the band for the Broadway musical Movin' Out. Cavanaugh was handpicked by Billy Joel for this musical and appeared in the show for three years and over 1300 performances.

== Career ==
Cavanaugh is the youngest of four boys who all played instruments. When he was 7, his parents bought a piano and he began playing immediately. He played his first club show at age 12. His aunt brought him from Cleveland to New York City when he was 13 to see his first Broadway musical. By age fourteen, Cavanaugh was playing keyboard with bands at weddings and other events several nights a week.

His first full-time gig as a musician was an extended engagement in Orlando, Florida at a piano bar on International Drive called Blazing Pianos. In January 1999, Cavanaugh had the opportunity to play in Las Vegas at the New York-New York Hotel and Casino, where he happened to catch the attention of Billy Joel in February 2001. Consequently, Cavanaugh moved to New York City to work with Billy Joel and Twyla Tharp, who together shaped the Broadway musical Movin' Out. Billboard magazine called him "the new voice of the American Rock and Roll Songbook". While appearing on Broadway, Cavanaugh and his family lived in Glen Rock, New Jersey.

With the close of Movin' Out at the end of 2005, Cavanaugh began touring on his own, creating a show that reinterpreted the modern pop/rock songbook. Cavanaugh continues to perform worldwide for corporate and charity functions, as well as at sporting events including the Indy 500, the PGA Tour, and the US Open.

Symphony orchestras soon began booking Cavanaugh. His first orchestra engagement, a "Michael Cavanaugh — The Songs of Billy Joel and more" program, debuted in April 2008 with the Indianapolis Symphony. In October 2008, he signed with ADA/Warner to distribute his first CD, titled In Color.

Cavanaugh made his Boston Pops Orchestra debut on May 8–9, 2009, with Steven Reineke conducting. He returned to play another engagement with the Boston Pops in 2015, featuring music by Neil Diamond, Paul Simon, and James Taylor.

In 2010, he debuted a new orchestra production, his second, called "Generations of Rock", in which he plays Elton John and other artists who have inspired him.

In 2012, Cavanaugh performed with the Florida Orchestra, playing a mix of classical and contemporary music by composers including Billy Joel, Elton John, John Lennon and Paul McCartney. He created his third symphony show, "Singers and Songwriters: The music of Paul Simon, Neil Diamond and James Taylor" that year, and was still touring with the production as of July 2014.

In 2014, he performed with the Hartford Symphony Orchestra as part of its Pops! series, in a program called "The Music of Billy Joel & More". Later that year, he performed with the Houston Symphony as well.

== Awards and recognition ==
In 2003, for his role in Movin' Out, Cavanaugh received both a Grammy nomination and a Tony nomination. That year's Tony went to Dick Latessa (who played Wilbur Turnblad in Hairspray).

== Personal life ==
When not on the road or recording, Cavanaugh resides in Las Vegas with his family. He and his wife Karin have a son, Matthew, and a daughter, Mikayla.

Cavanaugh has synesthesia. As he explained to the Cleveland Plain Dealer, "When I hear a note of C, I see the color red in my mind's eye. A is blue, F is gray. Growing up I thought everyone was like this." He attributes some of his facility at learning songs quickly to his synesthesia.
