= Matthew S. Friedman =

American human rights advocate

Matthew S. Friedman is an American human rights advocate with an expertise in human trafficking and modern slavery. He is currently the chief executive officer of the Mekong Club, a Hong Kong-based organization that mobilizes the private sector to help fight modern slavery.

== Biography ==
Friedman grew up in Hartford, Connecticut. In a career spanning three decades, he has worked as a manager, a program designer, an evaluator, and a frontline responder in multiple countries, including Nepal, Bangladesh, and Thailand. In 2012, he founded the Mekong Club, a Hong Kong-based nonprofit organization that supports businesses to identify and address modern slavery in their supply chains.

Friedman has raised awareness of human trafficking and modern slavery through writing articles for the South China Morning Post, delivering TEDx Talks, and speaking at many other events around the world.

In the summer of 2016, alongside his wife, Sylvia Yu Friedman, he delivered presentations on the topic of human trafficking across 17 US states to 112 organizations, including Bank of America and Disney.

In 2017, he won Public Affairs Asia's Gold Standard Award for Communicator of the Year.

He has authored several fiction and nonfiction books, some of which are based on his counter-trafficking work.

== Publications ==
- The Gorkha Urn, University Editions, Huntington, WV, March 1997, ISBN 9781560027126 (Fiction)
- Tara: A Fleshtrade Odyssey, Vikas Publishing, New Delhi, India, March 1997, ISBN 9788125902799 (Fiction)
- Nepalese Casted Decanters, Vessels and Bowls, Pilgrims Publishing House, Varanasi, India, April 2000, ISBN 9788177690491 (Nonfiction)
- Bangladesh Metal Casting: Five Techniques, University Press Ltd, Dhaka Bangladesh, April 2001, ISBN 9789840516063 (Nonfiction)
- Proximity and Time, Pilgrims Publishing House, Varanasi, India, February 2003, ISBN 9788177691979 (Nonfiction)
- Nepalese Cast Religious and Cultural Lamps, Pilgrims Publishing House, Varanasi, India, June 2003, ISBN 9788177692044 (Nonfiction)
- In the Shadow of the Tamarind Tree, Vijitha Yapa Publishing House, Colombo, Sri Lanka, May 2005, ISBN 9789558095935 (Fiction)
- Paths Less Traveled, Pilgrims Publishing House, Varanasi, India, April 2009, ISBN 9788177697681 (Fiction)
- Afghan Girl, Kindle Direct Publishing, November 2014, ASIN: B00QRDK1CG (Fiction)
- Where Were You?: A Profile of Modern Slavery, Freedom Campaign, January 2016, ASIN: B01A6EPRSE (Nonfiction)
- Be the Hero: Be the Change, Freedom Publishers, March 2020, ISBN 9780578665214 (Nonfiction)
