= Legacy Robe =

Broadway tradition

The Legacy Robe is a tradition in which a chorus ensemble member receives the robe (dressing gown) on the opening night of a Broadway musical. Begun informally by musical chorus members in 1950, it grew into a tradition with customs, and eventually came to be bestowed on the chorus member with the most Broadway credits, who then imparts the robe's legendary "luck" on the show. Originally known as the Gypsy Robe, the name of the colorful patchwork garment, which garners mementoes and cast signatures from each new opening show until retired, was changed in July 2018. Several past robes are now housed in cultural institutions in New York City, and the Smithsonian, or held by Actors Equity. Actors Equity now regulates the customs of the robe.

== Ritual ==
Before curtain on the opening night of a Broadway musical, actors, stage managers, crew, and everyone associated with the play gather onstage for the Legacy Robe ceremony. At the center of the stage will be a representative of Actors' Equity Association and a recent honoree (formerly "gypsy"). The guest honoree wears the robe that's decorated with mementos and drawings from past shows. The Equity representative tells the history of the ritual and announces the newest recipient from the company. The new recipient puts on the robe, and circles the stage counter-clockwise three times as everyone touches the robe for good luck. The Legacy Robe recipient then makes their way throughout the theater to continue bringing good luck.

== Rules of the ritual ==
The Actors' Equity Association maintains the following rules:

1. The Legacy Robe goes only to Broadway musicals with a chorus.
2. The Robe goes to a chorus member only, whoever has the largest number of Broadway Chorus credits.
3. The Ceremony traditionally occurs half an hour before opening night.
4. The new recipient must put on Robe and circle the stage counterclockwise three times, while cast members reach out and touch Robe for good luck. The new recipient then visits each dressing room while wearing the Robe.
5. The new recipient supervises addition of appliques from their show to the Robe. Important rules for adding mementos: for wearability, durability and longevity, add-ons must be lightweight, sturdy and reasonably sized so each Robe can represent a full season.
6. The opening night date and recipient's name is written on or near the memento, and cast members only sign that section of Robe.
7. The recipient will attend the next Broadway musical opening and will present the Robe to that show's recipient.

Aside from formal rules, other customs are observed before the new Robe recipient is introduced. A representative of Actors' Equity invites cast members making their Broadway debut to center stage to be recognized. The production's Equity chorus counselors are then introduced, followed by members of the chorus who have previously received the Robe. The standing honoree reads a scripted history of the Robe, then introduces the new production's recipient.

== History ==
The ritual dates to 1950, when Florence Baum, a chorus member in Gentlemen Prefer Blondes, entered the men's dressing room wearing a robe, pale pink with white feathers. The men took turns trying it on. Fellow chorus member Bill Bradley sent a dressing gown from one of his fellow performers to his friend performing in Call Me Madam. A feathered rose from Ethel Merman's costume was attached to the robe, and it was then given to a chorus member in Guys and Dolls. The robe continued to be passed from one show to another, each time with a memento added on.

The ritual has become more formal, with rules about how it is presented, worn and displayed. When robes are full of artifacts, a new robe is started. Retired robes are kept at the New York Public Library for the Performing Arts, at the Smithsonian, and at Actors' Equity.

== Naming ==
The exact origins of the original name gypsy robe are not known, however theatre historians believe it to relate to the travelling lifestyle of early-20th-century American actors, which was associated with clichés about the supposed lifestyle of Romani people. Eventually, gypsy became a common term in the theatre profession when referring to Broadway dancers, some of whom would embrace the term as a form of self-identity.

In the 2010s, with an increased awareness of diversity issues in the theater profession, usage of the term became less common, and Actors' Equity decided that they did not want to have the tradition of the robe associated with what many perceived to be an ethnic slur. On April 18, 2018, they announced that the name of robe would be changed at the end of the current theater season. A poll was opened to union members to vote on a new name. The new name chosen is the Legacy Robe; the first Legacy Robe presentation took place on July 26, 2018, during the musical Head Over Heels.

== Notable recipients ==
- Emma Sofia (Cats: The Jellicle Ball)
- Casey Nicholaw (Thoroughly Modern Millie)
- Jonalyn Saxer (Back to the Future)
- Brynn Williams (In My Life), the youngest Robe recipient at age 12
- Angie Schworer (Big Fish)
