= On Your Feet =

On Your Feet may refer to:

- On Your Feet (The Movement album), 2004 debut album by rock/reggae band The Movement
- On Your Feet (Spoken album), 1997 debut album by Christian rock band Spoken
- On Your Feet!, a 2015 musical based on the lives of Emilio and Gloria Estefan
