= Faith Prince =

American actress and singer

- Born: Augusta, Georgia, U.S.
- Education: University of Cincinnati (BFA)
- Occupations: Actress, singer
- Years active: 1982–present
- Spouse: Larry Lunetta (m. 1992)
- Children: 1

Faith Prince is an American actress and singer, best known for her work on Broadway in musical theatre. She won the Tony Award for Best Actress in Guys and Dolls in 1992, and received three other Tony nominations.

== Life and career ==
Prince was born in Augusta, Georgia, and raised in Lynchburg, Virginia, where she attended E.C. Glass High School, and later studied theater at the University of Cincinnati – College-Conservatory of Music. She made her Broadway debut as the Gypsy character Tessie Tura in Jerome Robbins' Broadway (1989) and followed this with a role in the ill-fated Nick & Nora.

She was established as a Broadway star with her portrayal of Miss Adelaide in the 1992 revival of Guys and Dolls, for which she won both the Tony and Drama Desk Award as Best Actress in a Musical. In 2001, Prince was once again nominated for Tony and Drama Desk Awards for her portrayal of Ella Peterson in the revival of Bells Are Ringing. She was featured in the 2008 Broadway musical A Catered Affair, for which she received Tony and Drama Desk nominations.

She appeared in a concert version of Sweeney Todd with the Orlando Philharmonic Orchestra in Orlando, Florida in March 2009. On April 7, 2009, she took over the role of Ursula from Heidi Blickenstaff in the Broadway musical The Little Mermaid.

She appeared in such films as The Last Dragon (1985), Dave (1993), Picture Perfect (1997), and Our Very Own (2005), among others. Her television credits include the short-lived High Society (1995); recurring roles on Spin City (1997–2000) and Huff (2004–2005), as well as guest appearances on such shows as Between the Lions, Remington Steele, Law & Order, Monk, Frasier, House, Grey's Anatomy, Drop Dead Diva, Ugly Betty, and Happy Endings.

A live recording of her 2005 cabaret debut at Joe's Pub, at The Public Theater, entitled A Leap of Faith, was released on the DRG Records label. A second recording, titled Total Faith was recorded at the Royal Room, Palm Beach, Florida. She participated in studio recordings of scores from Breakfast at Tiffany's and Jerry Herman's unproduced musical, Miss Spectacular.

She performs her cabaret act in various venues, such as the Orange County Performing Arts Center, California, in April 2010, and at the Caramoor Center for Music and the Arts, Westchester County, New York, in May 2010. Prince appeared in the concert version (and accompanying recording) of the revue Life Begins at 8:40 at the Library of Congress in Washington, D.C., on March 22, 2010. She also performed the closing show in the 2002–2003 theatre season at Eisenhower Hall at West Point.

Prince played Mrs. Wilkinson in the second United States national tour of Billy Elliot the Musical, which began performances in October 2010 and ended in August 2011.

In 2012, Prince worked with long-term friend Jason Graae on The Prince and the Showboy, a show which pays tribute to composer Jerry Herman (La Cage aux Folles, Hello Dolly!) whom Graae described as "a survivor of the highest degree [who] lives his life as an eternal optimist." Prince and Graae won the New York Nightlife Award for outstanding musical comedy performer in January 2013.

She returned to the Broadway stage replacing Jane Lynch as Miss Hannigan in the revival of Annie beginning July 19, 2013. She then appeared as Shirley in the Broadway production of Disaster!

She had a recurring role in the ABC Family sitcom, Melissa & Joey, as Gloria Longo, and in the Fox musical drama Monarch as Nellie Cantrell.

Since 2024 she has co-led the annual 92NY Summer Cabaret Conference alongside Michael Kirk Lane.

She returned to Broadway in 2025 in Boop! The Musical as Valentina.

== Personal life ==
Prince has been married to trumpeter Larry Lunetta since 1992; they reside in Sacramento, California, with their son. She has been predeceased by her brother, Philip.

Prince is a Presbyterian.

== Selected stage productions ==
- Little Shop of Horrors (1982)
- Carousel (1986)
- Jerome Robbins' Broadway (1989)
- Falsettoland (1990)
- Nick & Nora (1991)
- Guys and Dolls (1992 revival)
- What's Wrong with This Picture? (1994)
- The King and I (1996 revival)
- Little Me (1998 revival)
- James Joyce's The Dead (2000)
- The Torch-Bearers (2000)
- Noises Off (2001 revival)
- Bells Are Ringing (2001 revival)
- A Man of No Importance (2002)
- Falsettos (2003)
- A Catered Affair (2008)
- The Little Mermaid (2009)
- Billy Elliot (Second National Tour) (2010–2011)
- The Prince and the Showboy (2012)
- Annie (2013–2014)
- First Wives Club (2015)
- Disaster! (2016)
- Boop! The Musical (2023, 2025)

== Awards and nominations ==
Year	Award	Category	Nominated work	Result	Notes
1989	Drama Desk Award	Outstanding Actress in a Musical	Jerome Robbins' Broadway	Nominated	
1989	Tony Award	Best Featured Actress in a Musical	Jerome Robbins' Broadway	Nominated	
1992	Outer Critics Circle Awards	Best Actress in a Musical	Guys and Dolls and Nick & Nora	Won	
1992	Drama Desk Award	Outstanding Actress in a Musical	Guys and Dolls	Won	
1992	Tony Award	Best Actress in a Musical	Guys and Dolls	Won	
2001	Drama Desk Award	Outstanding Actress in a Musical	Bells Are Ringing	Nominated	
2001	Outer Critics Circle Awards	Outstanding Actress in a Musical	Bells Are Ringing	Nominated	
2001	Tony Award	Best Actress in a Musical	Bells Are Ringing	Nominated	
2001	Helen Hayes Awards	Outstanding Lead Actress in a Non-Resident Production	James Joyce's The Dead	Nominated	
2008	Drama Desk Award	Outstanding Actress in a Musical	A Catered Affair	Nominated	
2008	Outer Critics Circle Awards	Outstanding Actress in a Musical	A Catered Affair	Nominated	
2008	Tony Award	Best Actress in a Musical	A Catered Affair	Nominated	
2012	New York Nightlife Award	Outstanding Musical Comedy Performer	The Prince and the Showboy	Won	Joint with Jason Graae
