= Ashley Tuttle =

American actress

Ashley Tuttle is an American musical theatre actress and dancer who is best known for her role in the musical Movin' Out, which earned her a Tony Award nomination in the category of "Best Performance by a Featured Actress".

== Biography ==
Tuttle was first active in dance, joining the ballet company American Ballet Theatre at age 16 and later becoming a principal dancer in 1997. She remained a prima ballerina with A.B.T. for 17 years.

In 2000 Tuttle joined the Twyla Tharp Dance Company while still also remaining a member of the American Ballet Theatre.

In 2003, Tuttle made her Broadway debut in Movin' Out, a stage production of Billy Joel's music, as Judy. She was nominated for a Tony Best Featured Actress in a Musical.

On May 22, 2011, Tuttle received an honorary doctorate of humanities degree from Wofford College in Spartanburg, South Carolina.

Tuttle is Director of Faculty at Ballet Tech, and also teaches ballet classes at Mark Morris Dance Group, Usdan Center, and Barnard College.
