= Fosse (musical) =

- Original cast recording
- Music: Various
- Lyrics: Various
- Basis: Revue of Bob Fosse's choreography
- Productions: 1999 Broadway; 2000 West End
- Awards: Tony Award for Best Musical; Drama Desk Outstanding Revue

Fosse is a three-act musical revue showcasing the choreography of Bob Fosse. The musical was conceived by Richard Maltby Jr., Chet Walker, and Ann Reinking.

== Concept and development ==
The first idea for Fosse was conceived by Chet Walker, who was in many of Bob Fosse's shows and served as dance captain. Walker began workshops in New York City, where he hired numerous dancers to begin the process of putting the numerous pieces of choreography on its feet. Livent, a Canadian-based theatrical production company, was the producer of workshops and also the pre-Broadway tour. Fosse started its tour in Toronto. A two-month rehearsal period was held at The National Ballet of Canada studios and a month of performances were at the North York Performing Arts Theatre, now known as the Toronto Centre for the Arts, in July 1998. Fosse then ran in Boston at the Colonial Theatre, in September 1998. The final leg of the tour before Broadway was at the Ahmanson Theatre in Los Angeles, California, in October and December 1998. In Los Angeles, the show went through many changes. Producers wanted the three-hours and 10 minute show to be cut down to a shorter two-hours and 30 minute show. The producers felt it was too long for a Broadway dance review.

== Productions ==
After 21 previews, the original Broadway production opened at the Broadhurst Theatre on January 14, 1999, and closed on August 25, 2001, after 1,093 performances. The musical was directed by Richard Maltby Jr. and Ann Reinking, with original choreography by Bob Fosse. The co-choreographer was Ann Reinking, with choreography re-creations by Chet Walker and dance reconstructions by Lainie Sakakura and Brad Musgrove with Gwen Verdon as artistic advisor.

In 2002, Fosse, featuring Reinking and Ben Vereen, was aired as part of the Great Performances series on PBS television. A London production opened at the West End Prince of Wales Theatre on February 8, 2000, and closed on January 6, 2001.

The musical did not recreate the musical numbers as originally presented but instead had primarily black-and-white costumes (including the all-important hats), set against a simple setting. Reviewer Ben Brantley of The New York Times describes the show: "The ghost of the man being celebrated -- blurred and fleeting but definitely there -- first shows up when the girl bursts onstage with a scream. That's the signal for a sequence lasting just 45 seconds, and it occurs halfway through the first act of Fosse, the hard-working but oddly affectless evening of dance by the choreographer Bob Fosse that opened last night at the Broadhurst Theater. At the sound of that scream, which echoes not with terror but with irrepressible energy, a slender, elfin-faced fellow with a goatee shoots into view, sliding on his side like a runaway roller skate. The orchestra is playing Cole Porter's "From This Moment On," as the couple perform an acrobatic, exuberant and exasperated mating dance, an ode to percolating hormones. You've just received, in darkest January, a quick infusion of springtime, and it's impossible not to grin. Those 45 seconds are famous. They had much to do with propelling Bob Fosse's career as a show-business-shaking choreographer and director of musical comedy. The vignette, here vibrantly performed by Andy Blankenbuehler and Lainie Sakakura, is a re-creation of the first sequence Fosse choreographed for film, a scene from the 1953 movie of Kiss Me, Kate, danced by Fosse and Carol Haney. It was a calling card, of sorts, announcing that an audacious new choreographic talent had arrived, and when you watch the film today, Fosse's pas de deux still seems to tear through the celluloid....There are only a few instances in which an infectious rush in the joy of performing gets past the footlights. You feel it in the athletic pride generated by Desmond Richardson's gymnastic Percussion 4 solo in the first act; in Scott Wise's satisfaction in turning tap steps into a personal stairway to heaven in Sing, Sing, Sing, and in, of all things, the salacious, watch-me delight that a young woman named Shannon Lewis draws from a 1970's artifact called I Gotcha, choreographed for Liza Minnelli's 1973 television special."

== Musical numbers ==
Act I

- "Life is Just a Bowl of Cherries" (from Big Deal)
- "Fosse's World"
- "Bye Bye Blackbird" (from Liza with a Z)
- "From the Edge" (from Dancin')
- "Percussion 4" (from Dancin')
- "Big Spender" (from Sweet Charity)
- "Crunchy Granola Suite" (from Dancin')
- "From This Moment On" (from Kiss Me, Kate)
- "Transition" (inspired by Redhead)
- "I Wanna Be a Dancin' Man" (from Dancin')

Act II

- "Shoeless Joe Ballet" (from Damn Yankees)
- "Dancing in the Dark"
- "Steam Heat" (from The Pajama Game)
- "I Gotcha" (from Liza with a Z)
- "Rich Man's Frug" (from Sweet Charity)
- "Transition: Silky Thoughts"
- "Cool Hand Luke" (from a 1968 Bob Hope television)
- "Dancin' Dan (Me and My Shadow)" (from Big Deal, also not on the Video of this Musical')
- "Nowadays/The Hot Honey Rag" (from Chicago)

Act III

- "Glory" (from Pippin)
- "Manson Trio" (from Pippin)
- "Mein Herr" (from Cabaret)
- "Take Off with Us/Three Pas de Deux" (from All That Jazz)
- "Razzle Dazzle" (from Chicago)
- "Who's Sorry Now?" (from All that Jazz)
- "There'll Be Some Changes Made" (from All that Jazz)
- "Mr. Bojangles" (from Dancin')
- "Life is Just a Bowl of Cherries" (Reprise)
- "Sing, Sing, Sing" (from Dancin')
- Curtain Call: "Beat Me Daddy, Eight to the Bar" (from Big Deal)

=== Broadway opening night cast ===
Valarie Pettiford, Jane Lanier, Eugene Fleming, Desmond Richardson, Sergio Trujillo, Scott Wise, Kim Morgan Greene, Mary Ann Lamb, Dana Moore, Elizabeth Parkinson, Julio Agustin, Brad Anderson, Andy Blankenbuehler, Marc Calamia, Holly Cruikshank, Lisa Gajda, Scott Jovovich, Christopher R. Kirby, Dede LaBarre, Shannon Lewis, Mary MacLeod, Brad Musgrove (Dance Captain), Michael Paternostro, Rachelle Rak, Lainie Sakakura (Dance Captain), Alex Sanchez.

== Awards and nominations ==
=== Original Broadway production ===
Year	Award	Category	Nominee	Result
1999	Tony Award	Best Musical		Won
1999	Tony Award	Best Performance by a Featured Actor in a Musical	Desmond Richardson	Nominated
1999	Tony Award	Best Performance by a Featured Actor in a Musical	Scott Wise	Nominated
1999	Tony Award	Best Performance by a Featured Actress in a Musical	Valarie Pettiford	Nominated
1999	Tony Award	Best Direction of a Musical	Richard Maltby Jr. and Ann Reinking	Nominated
1999	Tony Award	Best Orchestrations	Ralph Burns and Douglas Besterman	Won
1999	Tony Award	Best Costume Design	Santo Loquasto	Nominated
1999	Tony Award	Best Lighting Design	Andrew Bridge	Won
1999	Drama Desk Award	Outstanding Musical Revue		Won
1999	Drama Desk Award	Outstanding Featured Actress in a Musical	Jane Lanier	Nominated
1999	Drama Desk Award	Outstanding Director of a Musical	Richard Maltby Jr. and Ann Reinking	Nominated

=== Original London production ===
Year	Award	Category	Nominee	Result
2001	Laurence Olivier Award	Best New Musical		Nominated
2001	Laurence Olivier Award	Best Actress in a Musical	Nicola Hughes	Nominated
2001	Laurence Olivier Award	Best Theatre Choreographer	Bob Fosse and Ann Reinking	Won
