= Charlie Neshyba-Hodges =

American dancer

- Born: 1980-02-21
- Occupation: American dancer

Charlie Neshyba-Hodges (born February 21, 1980) is a contemporary American dancer.

Recent original Broadway production credits include Come Fly Away (2010), for which he won the 2010 Astaire Award for outstanding male dancer for his role as Marty. Rights to Come Fly Away were subsequently sold to the Wynn Las Vegas entertainment outlet, where a slightly shortened version of the show debuted on December 11, 2010 under the name "Sinatra Dance With Me."

In January 2018, Neshyba-Hodges published a TEDx ACCD talk, titled "Charlie Hodges - Failure", a story of how he was able to find success through failure and setbacks.
