= John Selya =

American ballet dancer and choreographer

John Selya is a professional dancer and choreographer. Selya was born in New York City and trained at the School of American Ballet. He joined the American Ballet Theatre in 1988, where he danced roles such as Birbanto and Lankendem in Le Corsaire, Lead Gypsy in Don Quixote, Head Fakir in La Bayadere, Dr. Coppelius in Coppelia, and an Ugly Stepsister in Ben Stevenson's Cinderella. He choreographed several ballets for the company, including Moondance, Jack and Jill, Don't Panic, Turnstile, and Disposition. In 2000, Selya joined Twyla Tharp Dance.

Selya appeared in the 2010 Broadway musical Come Fly Away in which Twyla Tharp choreographed songs sung by Frank Sinatra. He previously appeared in the Broadway revival of Guys and Dolls (2009) as Scranton Slim, in Damn Yankees as Eddie/Mambo Dancer (2008), and in The Times They Are A-Changin' as Lucibeal (2006). He played the character "Eddie" in the show Movin' Out for which he received the 2003 Tony and Drama Desk nominations for Best Male Dancer and Lead Actor in a musical and won the 2003 TDF/Astaire Award for Best Male Dancer in a Musical and the Theater World Award.

== Choreography ==
In the spring of 2008, Selya premiered two works, "Tweaker" and "La Voix humaine" (after Cocteau's play) at the Joyce SoHo, where he was awarded a choreographic residency.
