= Elizabeth Parkinson =

American stage actress and dancer

Elizabeth Parkinson is an American stage actress and dancer. She is best known for playing Brenda in the original production of the musical Movin' Out. For this performance she was nominated for the 2003 Tony Award for Best Performance by a Leading Actress in a Musical, the Drama Desk Award for Outstanding Actress in a Musical and won the 2003 Astaire Award for Best Female Dancer.

== Career ==
Parkinson has performed with many ballet companies, including Joffrey Ballet and Twyla Tharp Dance. She appeared on Broadway in the musical Fosse in 1999 and then in Movin' Out (2002).

Parkinson appeared in the Stephen Sondheim and Wynton Marsalis Encores! concert, A Bed and a Chair: A New York Love Affair, from November 13 through 17, 2013 at City Center, New York City.

She is the co-owner/co-director of Fineline Theatre Arts with her husband, fellow performer Scott Wise; the couple have one child.

== Stage work ==
Theatre credits
Year	Title	Role	Venue	Refs.
1995	Singin' in the Rain	Olga Mara, featured dancer	Pittsburgh Civic Light Opera	
1998	Fosse	dancer	Ford Centre for the Performing Arts, Toronto	
1998	Fosse	dancer	Colonial Theatre, Boston	
1998	Fosse	dancer	Ahmanson Theatre, Los Angeles	
1998	Fosse	dancer	Broadhurst Theater, Broadway	
2002	Movin' Out	Brenda	Richard Rodgers Theater, Broadway	
2006	Kismet	Princess Zubbediya	New York City Center	
2013	A Bed and a Chair: A New York Love Affair	dancer	New York City Center	
